= Germany at the 2019 Summer Universiade =

- Flag of Germany
- IOC code: GER

in Naples, Italy 3 July 2019 – 14 July 2019
- Medals Ranked 24th: Gold 1 Silver 9 Bronze 8 Total 18

Summer Universiade appearances
- 1959; 1961; 1963; 1965; 1967; 1970; 1973; 1975; 1977; 1979; 1981; 1983; 1985; 1987; 1989; 1991; 1993; 1995; 1997; 1999; 2001; 2003; 2005; 2007; 2009; 2011; 2013; 2015; 2017; 2019; 2021; 2025; 2027

Germany competed at the 2019 Summer Universiade in Naples, Italy held from 3 to 14 July 2019.

== Medal summary ==
=== Medal by sports ===
Medals by sport
Athletics	1	4	4	9
Diving	0	1	0	1
Fencing	0	2	0	2
Judo	0	0	2	2
Swimming	0	2	1	3
Table tennis	0	0	1	1

=== Medalists ===
Medal	Name	Sport	Event	Date
Gold	Caterina Granz	Athletics	Women's 1500 metres	July 13
Silver	Torben Blech	Athletics	Men's pole vault	July 12
Silver	Jessica-Bianca Wessolly	Athletics	Women's 200 metres	July 11
Silver	Christina Hering	Athletics	Women's 800 metres	July 10
Silver	Claudine Vita	Athletics	Women's discus throw	July 9
Silver	Frithjof Seidel	Diving	Men's 1 metre springboard	July 4
Bronze	Henning Prüfer	Athletics	Men's discus throw	July 13
Bronze	Lisa-Marie Kwayie	Athletics	Women's 100 metres	July 9
Bronze	Lisa-Marie Kwayie	Athletics	Women's 200 metres	July 11
Bronze	Imke Onnen	Athletics	Women's high jump	July 13
Bronze	Men's team	Table tennis	Men's team	
