= Athletics at the 2019 Summer Universiade – Women's 4 × 100 metres relay =

The women's 4 × 100 metres relay event at the 2019 Summer Universiade was held on 12 and 13 July at the Stadio San Paolo in Naples.

== Medalists ==
Gold	Silver	Bronze
Switzerland; Salomé Kora; Sarah Atcho; Ajla Del Ponte; Samantha Dagry; Riccarda Dietsche*	Australia; Abbie Taddeo; Nana Owusu-Afriyie; Riley Day; Celeste Mucci	New Zealand; Olivia Eaton; Zoe Hobbs; Georgia Hulls; Natasha Eady; Brooke Somerfield*

*Athletes who competed in heats only

== Results ==
=== Heats ===
Qualification: First 3 teams in each heat (Q) and the next 2 fastest (q) qualified for the final.

Rank	Heat	Nation	Athletes	Time	Notes
1	1	Switzerland	Riccarda Dietsche, Sarah Atcho, Ajla Del Ponte, Samantha Dagry	43.97	Q
2	1	Australia	Abbie Taddeo, Nana Owusu-Afriyie, Riley Day, Celeste Mucci	44.28	Q
3	2	New Zealand	Olivia Eaton, Brooke Somerfield, Georgia Hulls, Natasha Eady	44.77	Q
4	1	Mexico	María Mercedes Talamante, Rosa Cook, Dania Aguillón, Iza Flores	44.95	Q
5	1	Thailand	Sureewan Runan, On-Uma Chattha, Supawan Thipat, Supanich Poolkerd	44.96	q
6	2	Japan	Kanako Yuasa, Mai Fukuda, Mae Hirosawa, Ayaka Kōra	45.08	Q
7	2	Poland	Ewa Ochocka, Kamila Ciba, Agata Forkasiewicz, Ada Kołodziej	45.17	Q
8	2	Czech Republic	Lucie Koudelová, Helena Jiranová, Martina Hofmanová, Anna Křížková	45.65	q
9	2	Ghana	Latifa Ali, Salomey Agyei, Rafiatu Nuhu, Kate Agyemang	45.75	
10	1	Denmark	Louise Ostergard, Mette Graversgaard, Mathilde Heltbeck, Zarah Buchwald	46.02	
11	2	South Africa	Sokwakana Mogwasi, Taylon Bieldt, Eljone Kruger, Reabetswe Moloi	46.05	
12	2	Chile	Anaís Hernández, Sol Villanustre, Poulette Cardoch, María Montt	46.15	
13	1	India	Dhanalakshmi Sekar, Himani Chandel, Haluvalli Ramegowda, Dutee Chand	46.23	
14	1	Sri Lanka	Akshana Chathuba Akshana, Shanika Bokotuwe, Indika Srim Ihala Gamage, Omaya Muthumala	49.85	

=== Final ===
Rank	Lane	Nation	Athletes	Time	Notes
1st place, gold medalist(s)	6	Switzerland	Salomé Kora, Sarah Atcho, Ajla Del Ponte, Samantha Dagry	43.72	
2nd place, silver medalist(s)	5	Australia	Abbie Taddeo, Nana Owusu-Afriyie, Riley Day, Celeste Mucci	43.97	
3rd place, bronze medalist(s)	4	New Zealand	Olivia Eaton, Zoe Hobbs, Georgia Hulls, Natasha Eady	44.24	NR
4	8	Mexico	María Mercedes Talamante, Rosa Cook, Dania Aguillón, Iza Flores	44.82	
5	3	Japan	Kanako Yuasa, Mai Fukuda, Mae Hirosawa, Tomomi Yanagiya	44.91	
6	2	Thailand	Sureewan Runan, On-Uma Chattha, Supawan Thipat, Supanich Poolkerd	45.23	
7	1	Czech Republic	Lucie Koudelová, Helena Jiranová, Martina Hofmanová, Anna Křížková	45.83	
	7	Poland	Ewa Ochocka, Kamila Ciba, Agata Forkasiewicz, Ada Kołodziej	DQ	R170.7
