= Athletics at the 2019 Summer Universiade =

- Dates: 8–13 July
- Host city: Naples, Italy
- Venue: Stadio San Paolo
- Level: Senior
- Events: 50
- Participation: 1143 athletes from 93 nations

Athletics was contested at the 2019 Summer Universiade from July 8 to 13 at the Stadio San Paolo in Naples, Italy.

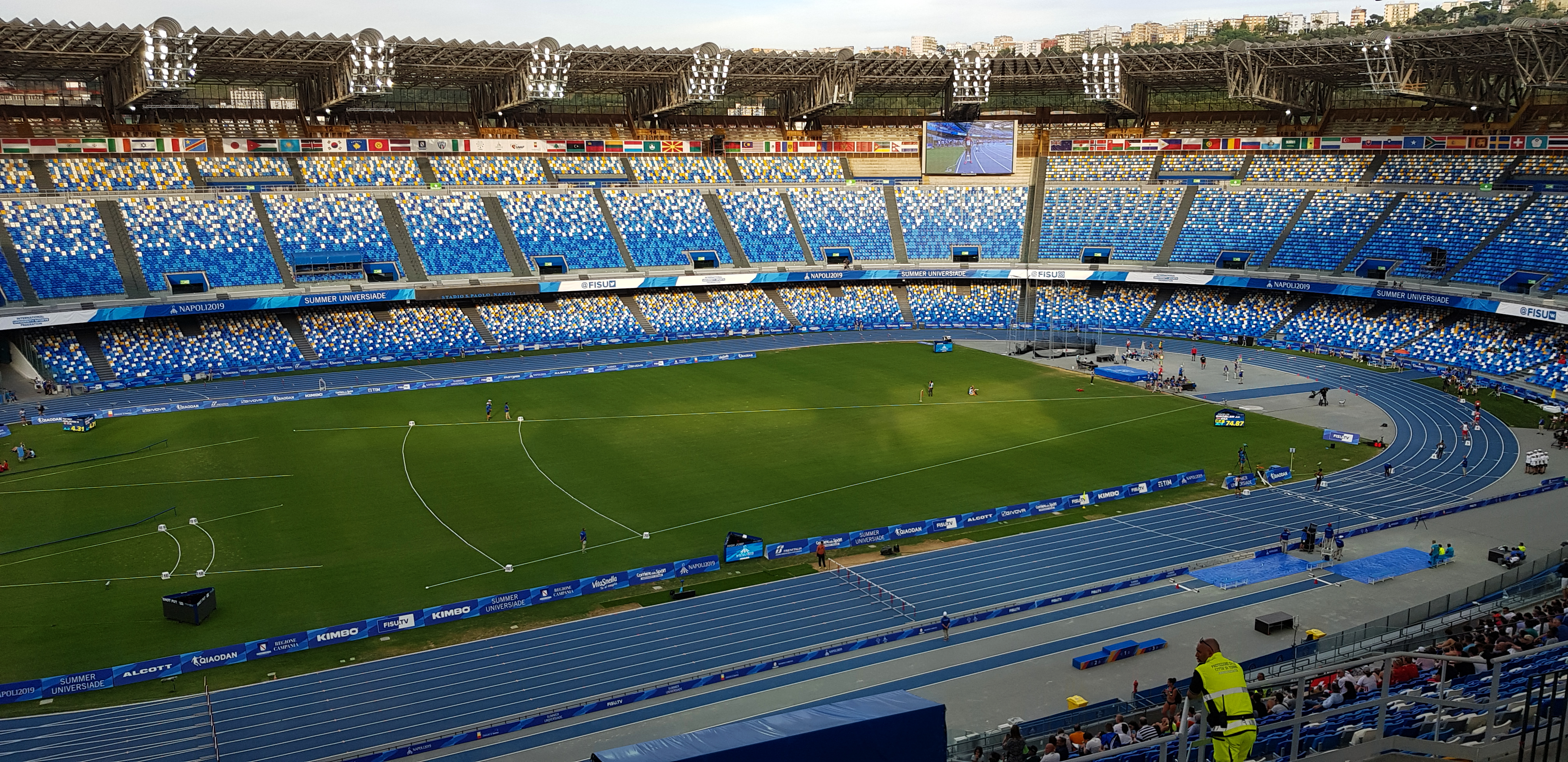

== Medal summary ==
=== Men's events ===
| Event | Gold | | Silver | | Bronze | |
|---|---|---|---|---|---|---|
| 100 metres | Paulo André Camilo; Brazil | 10.09 | Chederick van Wyk; South Africa | 10.23 | Rodrigo Pereira; Brazil | 10.32 |
| 200 metres | Paulo André Camilo; Brazil | 20.28 | Chederick van Wyk; South Africa | 20.44 | Marcus Lawler; Ireland | 20.55 |
| 400 metres | Valente Mendoza; Mexico | 45.63 PB | Mikhail Litvin; Kazakhstan | 45.77 SB | Gardeo Isaacs; South Africa | 45.89 |
| 800 metres | Mohamed Belbachir; Algeria | 1:47.02 | Moad Zahafi; Morocco | 1:47.64 | Lukáš Hodboď; Czech Republic | 1:47.97 SB |
| 1500 metres | Michał Rozmys; Poland | 3:53.67 | Jan Friš; Czech Republic | 3:53.95 | Joonas Rinne; Finland | 3:54.02 |
| 5000 metres | Jonas Raess; Switzerland | 14:03.10 | Yann Schrub; France | 14:03.24 | Robin Hendrix; Belgium | 14:04.06 |
| 10,000 metres | Mokofane Kekana; South Africa | 29:29.43 | Hiroki Abe; Japan | 29:30.01 | Adriaan Wildschutt; South Africa | 29:36.39 |
| 110 metres hurdles | Gabriel Constantino; Brazil | 13.22 | Wilhem Belocian; France | 13.30 SB | Shunsuke Izumiya; Japan | 13.49 PB |
| 400 metres hurdles | Alison dos Santos; Brazil | 48.57 SB | Sokwakhana Zazini; South Africa | 48.73 SB | Patryk Dobek; Poland | 48.99 |
| 3000 metres steeplechase | Mounaime Sassioui; Morocco | 8:30.24 | Rantso Mokopane; South Africa | 8:30.37 PB | Ashley Smith; South Africa | 8:33.60 |
| 4 × 100 metres relay | Daisuke Miyamoto; Yoshihiro Someya; Jun Yamashita; Bruno Dede; Japan | 38.92 | Jiang Jiehua; Jiang Hengnan; Wang Yu; Xuan Dajun; China | 39.01 | Lee Gyu-hyeong; Ko Seung-hwan; Mo Il-hwan; Park Sie-young; South Korea | 39.31 |
| 4 × 400 metres relay | Fernando Vega; José Ricardo Jiménez; Édgar Ramírez; Valente Mendoza; Mexico | 3:02.89 NR | Gardeo Isaacs; Zakithi Nene; Kefilwe Mogawane; Sokwakhana Zazini; Jon Seeliger; South Africa | 3:03.23 | Wiktor Suwara; Dariusz Kowaluk; Kajetan Duszyński; Patryk Dobek; Patryk Adamczyk; Poland | 3:03.35 |
| Half marathon | Akira Aizawa; Japan | 1:05:15 | Taisei Nakamura; Japan | 1:05:27 | Tatsuhiko Ito; Japan | 1:05: |
| Half marathon team | Akira Aizawa; Taisei Nakamura; Tatsuhiko Ito; Japan | 3:16:30 | Saffet Elkatmış; Ferhat Bozkurt; Ersin Tekal; Turkey | 3:24:47 | Jacob Simonsen; Frederik Ernst; Martin Olesen; Denmark | 3:30:29 |
| 20 kilometres walk | Koki Ikeda; Japan | 1:22:49 | Masatora Kawano; Japan | 1:23:20 | Yuta Koga; Japan | 1:23:35 |
| 20 kilometres walk team | Koki Ikeda; Masatora Kawano; Yuta Koga; Japan | 4:09:44 | Joo Hyun-meong; Kim Min-gyu; Kim Nak-hyun; South Korea | 4:46:21 | not awarded | |
| High jump | Tihomir Ivanov; Bulgaria | 2.30 m SB | Alperen Acet; Turkey | 2.24 m | Adrijus Glebauskas; Lithuania | 2.24 m SB |
| Pole vault | Ernest John Obiena; Philippines | 5.76 m NR | Torben Blech; Germany | 5.76 m PB | Ben Broeders; Belgium | 5.51 m |
| Long jump | Yuki Hashioka; Japan | 8.01 m | Yann Randrianasolo; France | 7.95 m | Darcy Roper; Australia | 7.90 m |
| Triple jump | Nazim Babayev; Azerbaijan | 16.89 m | Mateus de Sá; Brazil | 16.57 m SB | Alexsandro do Nascimento; Brazil | 16.57 m |
| Shot put | Konrad Bukowiecki; Poland | 21.54 m UR | Andrew Liskowitz; United States | 20.49 m PB | Uziel Muñoz; Mexico | 20.45 m |
| Discus throw | Matthew Denny; Australia | 65.27 m | Alin Alexandru Firfirică; Romania | 63.74 m | Henning Prüfer; Germany | 63.52 m PB |
| Hammer throw | Özkan Baltacı; Turkey | 75.98 m SB | Serhiy Reheda; Ukraine | 74.27 m | Taylor Campbell; Great Britain | 73.86 m PB |
| Javelin throw | Andrian Mardare; Moldova | 82.40 m | Edis Matusevičius; Lithuania | 80.07 m | Ma Qun; China | 79.62 m |
| Decathlon | Aaron Booth; New Zealand | 7827 pts PB | Alexander Diamond; Australia | 7593 pts PB | Sutthisak Singkhon; Thailand | 7511 pts |

=== Women's events ===
| Event | Gold | | Silver | | Bronze | |
|---|---|---|---|---|---|---|
| 100 metres | Dutee Chand; India | 11.32 | Ajla Del Ponte; Switzerland | 11.33 | Lisa-Marie Kwayie; Germany | 11.39 |
| 200 metres | Krystsina Tsimanouskaya; Belarus | 23.00 PB | Jessica-Bianca Wessolly; Germany | 23.05 | Lisa-Marie Kwayie; Germany | 23.11 PB |
| 400 metres | Paola Morán; Mexico | 51.52 SB | Leni Shida; Uganda | 51.64 SB | Amandine Brossier; France | 51.77 PB |
| 800 metres | Catriona Bisset; Australia | 2:01.20 | Christina Hering; Germany | 2:01.87 | Docus Ajok; Uganda | 2:02.31 SB |
| 1500 metres | Caterina Granz; Germany | 4:09.14 SB | Georgia Griffith; Australia | 4:09.89 | Courtney Hufsmith; Canada | 4:11.81 PB |
| 5000 metres | Jessica Judd; Great Britain | 15:45.82 | Nicole Hutchinson; Canada | 15:48.06 | Julia van Velthoven; Netherlands | 15:51.75 PB |
| 10,000 metres | Zhang Deshun; China | 34:03.31 | Rino Goshima; Japan | 34:04.65 | Natsuki Sekiya; Japan | 34:05.84 |
| 100 metres hurdles | Luminosa Bogliolo; Italy | 12.79 PB | Reetta Hurske; Finland | 13.02 | Coralie Comte; France | 13.09 PB |
| 400 metres hurdles | Ayomide Folorunso; Italy | 54.75 PB | Zeney van der Walt; South Africa | 55.73 SB | Amalie Iuel; Norway | 56.13 |
| 3000 metres steeplechase | Alicja Konieczek; Poland | 9:41.46 SB | Belén Casetta; Argentina | 9:43.05 SB | Meswat Asmare Dagnaw; Ethiopia | 9:45.48 PB |
| 4 × 100 metres relay | Salomé Kora; Sarah Atcho; Ajla Del Ponte; Samantha Dagry; Riccarda Dietsche; Switzerland | 43.72 | Abbie Taddeo; Nana Owusu-Afriyie; Riley Day; Celeste Mucci; Australia | 43.97 | Olivia Eaton; Zoe Hobbs; Georgia Hulls; Natasha Eady; Brooke Somerfield; New Zealand | 44.24 NR |
| 4 × 400 metres relay | Mariia Mykolenko; Anastasiia Holienieva; Kateryna Klymiuk; Tetiana Melnyk; Ukraine | 3:30.82 | Frida Corona; Dania Aguillón; Rosa Cook; Paola Morán; Mexico | 3:32.63 | Genevieve Cowie; Morgan Mitchell; Jessie Stafford; Gabriella O'Grady; Australia | 3:34.01 |
| Half marathon | Yuka Suzuki; Japan | 1:14:10 | Rika Kaseda; Japan | 1:14:32 | Yuki Tagawa; Japan | 1:14:36 |
| Half marathon team | Yuka Suzuki; Rika Kaseda; Yuki Tagawa; Japan | 3:43:18 | Li Zhixuan; Zhang Deshun; Jin Mingming; China | 3:52:40 | Tyler Beling; Lesego Msphe; Rachel Leistra; South Africa | 4:19:15 |
| 20 kilometres walk | Katie Hayward; Australia | 1:33:30 | Jemima Montag; Australia | 1:33:57 | Wang Na; China | 1:37:33 |
| 20 kilometres walk team | Katie Hayward; Jemima Montag; Philippa Huse; Australia | 4:51:36 | Olena Sobchuk; Mariya Filiuk; Valentyna Myronchuk; Ukraine | 4:58:02 | Wang Na; Liu Yu; Su Wenxiu; China | 4:59:53 |
| High jump | Yuliya Chumachenko; Ukraine | 1.94 m PB | Iryna Herashchenko; Ukraine | 1.91 m | Imke Onnen; Germany | 1.91 m |
| Pole vault | Roberta Bruni; Italy | 4.46 m PB | Rachel Baxter; United States | 4.41 m | Bridget Guy; United States | 4.31 m |
| Long jump | Maryna Bekh-Romanchuk; Ukraine | 6.84 m | Evelise Veiga; Portugal | 6.61 m | Florentina Iusco; Romania | 6.55 m |
| Triple jump | Olha Korsun; Ukraine | 13.90 m PB | Evelise Veiga; Portugal | 13.81 m | Neja Filipič; Slovenia | 13.73 m |
| Shot put | Sarah Mitton; Canada | 18.31 m | Portious Warren; Trinidad and Tobago | 17.82 m | Klaudia Kardasz; Poland | 17.65 m |
| Discus throw | Daisy Osakue; Italy | 61.69 m PB | Claudine Vita; Germany | 61.52 m | Ieva Zarankaitė; Lithuania | 56.75 m |
| Hammer throw | Iryna Klymets; Ukraine | 71.25 m | Malwina Kopron; Poland | 70.89 m | Katarzyna Furmanek; Poland | 69.68 m PB |
| Javelin throw | Liveta Jasiūnaitė; Lithuania | 60.36 m | Haruka Kitaguchi; Japan | 60.15 m | Eda Tuğsuz; Turkey | 59.75 m |
| Heptathlon | Miia Sillman; Finland | 6209 pts PB | Marthe Koala; Burkina Faso | 6121 pts | Caroline Agnou; Switzerland | 5844 pts |

== Medal table ==
* Host nation (Italy)

| Rank | Nation | Gold | Silver | Bronze | Total |
|---|---|---|---|---|---|
| 1 | Japan (JPN) | 8 | 6 | 5 | 19 |
| 2 | Ukraine (UKR) | 5 | 3 | 0 | 8 |
| 3 | Australia (AUS) | 4 | 4 | 2 | 10 |
| 4 | Brazil (BRA) | 4 | 1 | 2 | 7 |
| 5 | Italy (ITA)* | 4 | 0 | 0 | 4 |
| 6 | Poland (POL) | 3 | 1 | 4 | 8 |
| 7 | Mexico (MEX) | 3 | 1 | 1 | 5 |
| 8 | Switzerland (SUI) | 2 | 1 | 1 | 4 |
| 9 | South Africa (RSA) | 1 | 6 | 4 | 11 |
| 10 | Germany (GER) | 1 | 4 | 4 | 9 |
| 11 | China (CHN) | 1 | 2 | 3 | 6 |
| 12 | Turkey (TUR) | 1 | 2 | 1 | 4 |
| 13 | Lithuania (LTU) | 1 | 1 | 2 | 4 |
| 14 | Canada (CAN) | 1 | 1 | 1 | 3 |
| 14 | Finland (FIN) | 1 | 1 | 1 | 3 |
| 16 | Morocco (MAR) | 1 | 1 | 0 | 2 |
| 17 | Great Britain (GBR) | 1 | 0 | 1 | 2 |
| 17 | New Zealand (NZL) | 1 | 0 | 1 | 2 |
| 19 | Algeria (ALG) | 1 | 0 | 0 | 1 |
| 19 | Azerbaijan (AZE) | 1 | 0 | 0 | 1 |
| 19 | Belarus (BLR) | 1 | 0 | 0 | 1 |
| 19 | Bulgaria (BUL) | 1 | 0 | 0 | 1 |
| 19 | India (IND) | 1 | 0 | 0 | 1 |
| 19 | Moldova (MDA) | 1 | 0 | 0 | 1 |
| 19 | Philippines (PHI) | 1 | 0 | 0 | 1 |
| 26 | France (FRA) | 0 | 3 | 2 | 5 |
| 27 | United States (USA) | 0 | 2 | 1 | 3 |
| 28 | Portugal (POR) | 0 | 2 | 0 | 2 |
| 29 | Czech Republic (CZE) | 0 | 1 | 1 | 2 |
| 29 | Romania (ROU) | 0 | 1 | 1 | 2 |
| 29 | South Korea (KOR) | 0 | 1 | 1 | 2 |
| 29 | Uganda (UGA) | 0 | 1 | 1 | 2 |
| 33 | Argentina (ARG) | 0 | 1 | 0 | 1 |
| 33 | Burkina Faso (BUR) | 0 | 1 | 0 | 1 |
| 33 | Kazakhstan (KAZ) | 0 | 1 | 0 | 1 |
| 33 | Trinidad and Tobago (TTO) | 0 | 1 | 0 | 1 |
| 37 | Belgium (BEL) | 0 | 0 | 2 | 2 |
| 38 | Denmark (DEN) | 0 | 0 | 1 | 1 |
| 38 | Ethiopia (ETH) | 0 | 0 | 1 | 1 |
| 38 | Ireland (IRL) | 0 | 0 | 1 | 1 |
| 38 | Netherlands (NED) | 0 | 0 | 1 | 1 |
| 38 | Norway (NOR) | 0 | 0 | 1 | 1 |
| 38 | Slovenia (SLO) | 0 | 0 | 1 | 1 |
| 38 | Thailand (THA) | 0 | 0 | 1 | 1 |
| Totals (44 entries) | | 50 | 50 | 49 | 149 |

== Participating nations ==
- Albania (1)
- Algeria (11)
- Argentina (21)
- Armenia (2)
- Australia (52)
- Austria (5)
- Azerbaijan (2)
- Bangladesh (2)
- Belarus (11)
- Belgium (9)
- Bermuda (2)
- Botswana (7)
- Brazil (16)
- Bulgaria (5)
- Burkina Faso (2)
- Canada (39)
- Central African Republic (2)
- Chile (16)
- China (32)
- Chinese Taipei (20)
- Costa Rica (2)
- Croatia (5)
- Cyprus (4)
- Czech Republic (20)
- Democratic Republic of the Congo (1)
- Denmark (29)
- Egypt (6)
- Estonia (15)
- Ethiopia (2)
- Eswatini (2)
- Ethiopia (2)
- Finland (19)
- France (16)
- Germany (23)
- Ghana (12)
- Great Britain (21)
- Honduras (1)
- Hong Kong (9)
- Hungary (7)
- India (41)
- Indonesia (11)
- Ireland (9)
- Israel (2)
- Italy (35)
- Ivory Coast (2)
- Japan (43)
- Kazakhstan (16)
- Kyrgyzstan (1)
- Kosovo (1)
- Latvia (6)
- Lebanon (7)
- Lithuania (22)
- Luxembourg (1)
- Macau (5)
- Madagascar (1)
- Malawi (2)
- Malaysia (9)
- Mexico (25)
- Moldova (6)
- Monaco (1)
- Morocco (8)
- Netherlands (10)
- New Zealand (27)
- Niger (2)
- North Macedonia (1)
- Norway (15)
- Oman (6)
- Philippines (4)
- Poland (30)
- Portugal (12)
- Romania (14)
- Saudi Arabia (13)
- San Marino (1)
- Senegal (6)
- Singapore (4)
- Slovakia (12)
- Slovenia (19)
- Somalia (2)
- South Africa (49)
- South Korea (22)
- Sri Lanka (33)
- Sweden (15)
- Switzerland (16)
- Thailand (17)
- Trinidad and Tobago (3)
- Turkey (24)
- Uganda (16)
- Ukraine (24)
- United States (27)
- Uruguay (1)
- Uzbekistan (6)
- Zambia (4)
- Zimbabwe (1)

Contrary to all other sports at this Universiade, athletes from Russia were not allowed to compete, due to the doping ban of the Russian Athletics Federation, which began in 2015. A start as Authorised Neutral Athletes was prevented by a lack of agreement between the IAAF and the FISU.

== See also ==
- 2019 in the sport of athletics
- FISU World University Games
- University and college sport
