= Athletics at the 2019 Summer Universiade – Women's 200 metres =

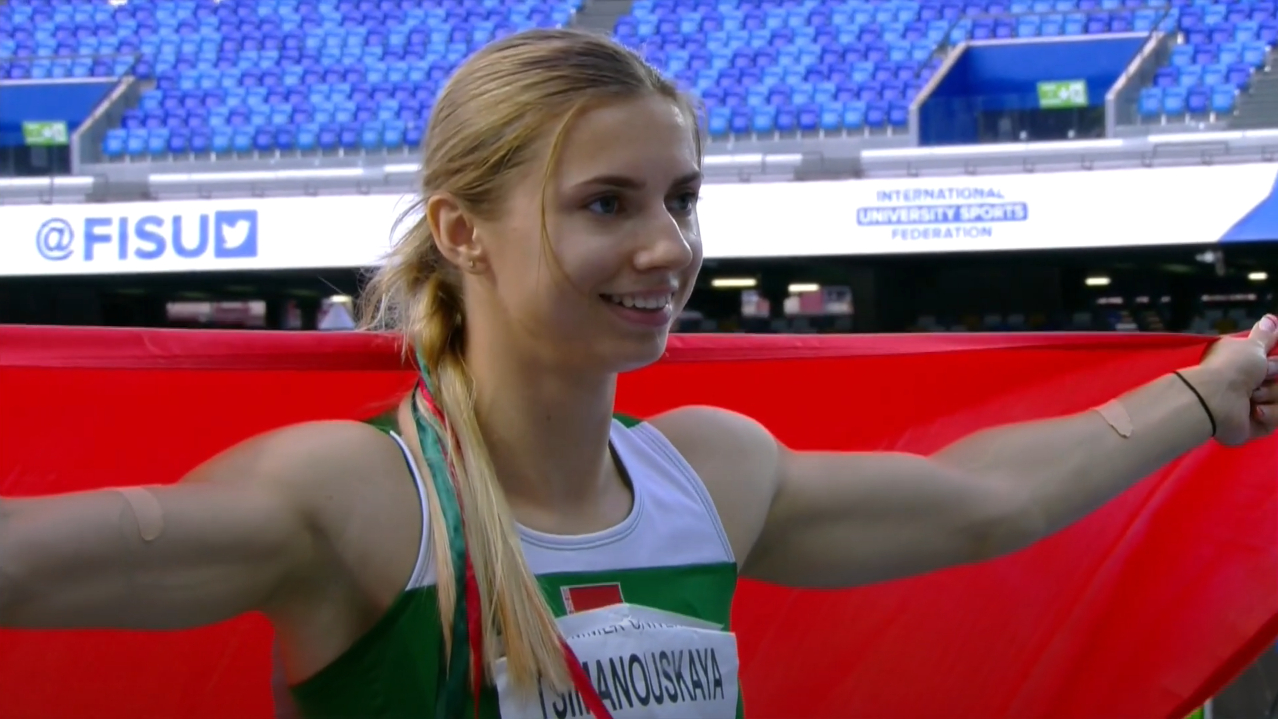
The winner Krystsina Tsimanouskaya

The women's 200 metres event at the 2019 Summer Universiade was held on 10 and 11 July at the Stadio San Paolo in Naples.

== Medalists ==
Gold	Silver	Bronze
Krystsina Tsimanouskaya; Belarus	Jessica-Bianca Wessolly; Germany	Lisa-Marie Kwayie; Germany

== Results ==
=== Heats ===
Qualification: First 2 in each heat (Q) and next 8 fastest (q) qualified for the semifinals.

Wind:
Heat 1: 0.0 m/s, Heat 2: +0.2 m/s, Heat 3: -0.8 m/s, Heat 4: +0.6 m/s, Heat 5: -1.5 m/s, Heat 6: -0.5 m/s, Heat 7: -0.2 m/s, Heat 8: -0.6 m/s

Rank	Heat	Name	Nationality	Time	Notes
1	3	Lisa-Marie Kwayie	Germany	23.13	Q, PB
2	3	Gunta Vaičule	Latvia	23.22	Q, SB
3	4	Jessica-Bianca Wessolly	Germany	23.28	Q
4	6	Phil Healy	Ireland	23.46	Q
5	4	Riley Day	Australia	23.59	Q
6	7	Olivia Fotopoulou	Cyprus	23.62	Q
7	4	Iza Flores	Mexico	23.64	q
8	4	Jacent Nyamahunge	Uganda	23.65	q, PB
9	7	Marcela Pírková	Czech Republic	23.73	Q
10	2	Krystsina Tsimanouskaya	Belarus	23.73	Q
11	3	Sarah Atcho	Switzerland	23.76	q
12	6	Taylon Bieldt	South Africa	23.89	Q, PB
13	5	Nana Owusu-Afriyie	Australia	23.97	Q
14	8	Zoe Hobbs	New Zealand	23.98	Q
15	6	Tamzin Thomas	South Africa	23.99	q
16	2	Lisa Lilja	Sweden	24.01	Q
17	5	Shanti Pereira	Singapore	24.01	Q
18	1	Dania Aguillón	Mexico	24.04	Q
19	8	Anniina Kortetmaa	Finland	24.05	Q
20	8	Mette Graversgaard	Denmark	24.08	q
21	1	Dutee Chand	India	24.08	Q
22	3	Noelia Martínez	Argentina	24.13	q
23	7	Samantha Dagry	Switzerland	24.15	q
24	7	Christin Bjelland Jensen	Norway	24.18	q, PB
25	1	Alicja Wrona	Poland	24.22	PB
26	1	Anna Bulanova	Kyrgyzstan	24.23	
27	2	Mizgin Ay	Turkey	24.34	SB
28	4	Evija Šefere	Latvia	24.36	SB
29	7	Alexandra Toth	Austria	24.39	
30	4	Tomomi Yanagiya	Japan	24.42	
31	3	Supanich Poolkerd	Thailand	24.45	
32	6	Olivia Eaton	New Zealand	24.50	
33	5	Dhanalakshmi Sekar	India	24.59	
34	3	Hajar Eddaou	Morocco	24.71	
35	6	Ugnė Jankauskaitė	Lithuania	24.74	
36	4	Javiera Cañas	Chile	24.76	
37	5	Ylenia Vitale	Italy	24.80	
38	8	Aleksandra Lubicka	Poland	24.81	
39	1	Hanna Palmqvist	Sweden	24.88	
40	8	Rasa Mažeikaitė	Lithuania	24.90	PB
41	5	Mae Hirosawa	Japan	24.93	
42	2	Malin Kulseth	Norway	24.96	
43	7	Berfe Sancak	Turkey	24.96	
44	1	Diana Podoleanu	Moldova	25.14	
45	3	Djamila Zine	Algeria	25.26	
46	7	Sureewan Runan	Thailand	25.33	PB
47	5	Vika Rutar	Slovenia	25.44	
48	8	Shirin Akter	Bangladesh	25.45	
49	4	Ambre Astrid Yelou	Ivory Coast	25.56	
50	3	Zarah Buchwald	Denmark	25.57	
51	2	Safaa Troubia	Algeria	25.97	
52	6	Lushomo Mukakanga	Zambia	26.15	
53	6	Patience Chikalira	Malawi	30.63	
54	2	Munirah Al-Turki	Saudi Arabia	33.26	
55	7	Dahabo Zubeyr	Somalia	34.34	
	2	María Montt	Chile	DQ	R162.8
	5	Kate Agyemang	Ghana	DQ	R163.3a
	1	Nafy Mane	Senegal	DNS	
	1	Nanah Yansaneh	Sierra Leone	DNS	
	2	Anna Keefer	United States	DNS	
	5	Abigaelle Dalamndji	Central African Republic	DNS	
	6	Leni Shida	Uganda	DNS	
	8	Basant Abdelsalam	Egypt	DNS	
	8	Latifa Ali	Ghana	DNS	

=== Semifinals ===
Qualification: First 2 in each heat (Q) and next 2 fastest (q) qualified for the final.

Wind:
Heat 1: -0.5 m/s, Heat 2: +0.1 m/s, Heat 3: +1.1 m/s

Rank	Heat	Name	Nationality	Time	Notes
1	1	Krystsina Tsimanouskaya	Belarus	23.20	Q
2	1	Jessica-Bianca Wessolly	Germany	23.21	Q
3	2	Dutee Chand	India	23.24	Q
4	2	Gunta Vaičule	Latvia	23.32	Q, SB
5	3	Lisa-Marie Kwayie	Germany	23.34	Q, PB
6	3	Zoe Hobbs	New Zealand	23.35	Q
7	3	Iza Flores	Mexico	23.42	q, SB
8	2	Phil Healy	Ireland	23.43	q
9	1	Sarah Atcho	Switzerland	23.53	
10	2	Riley Day	Australia	23.56	
11	1	Tamzin Thomas	South Africa	23.66	
12	2	Olivia Fotopoulou	Cyprus	23.69	
13	3	Lisa Lilja	Sweden	23.71	
14	1	Shanti Pereira	Singapore	23.78	SB
15	1	Dania Aguillón	Mexico	23.78	
16	3	Taylon Bieldt	South Africa	23.83	PB
17	3	Nana Owusu-Afriyie	Australia	23.85	
18	1	Jacent Nyamahunge	Uganda	23.85	PB
19	1	Marcela Pírková	Czech Republic	23.89	
20	2	Noelia Martínez	Argentina	23.95	PB
21	2	Anniina Kortetmaa	Finland	24.08	
22	3	Samantha Dagry	Switzerland	24.19	
23	3	Christin Bjelland Jensen	Norway	24.24	
	2	Mette Graversgaard	Denmark	DNS	

=== Final ===
Official Video

Wind: +1.0 m/s

Rank	Lane	Name	Nationality	Time	Notes
1st place, gold medalist(s)	5	Krystsina Tsimanouskaya	Belarus	23.00	PB
2nd place, silver medalist(s)	4	Jessica-Bianca Wessolly	Germany	23.05	
3rd place, bronze medalist(s)	6	Lisa-Marie Kwayie	Germany	23.11	PB
4	7	Gunta Vaičule	Latvia	23.12	SB
5	3	Dutee Chand	India	23.30	
6	2	Phil Healy	Ireland	23.44	
7	8	Zoe Hobbs	New Zealand	23.52	
8	1	Iza Flores	Mexico	23.64	
