= Matteo Neri =

Italian fencer (born 1999)

Personal information
- Born: 5 May 1999 (age 27)

Fencing career
- Sport: Fencing
- Country: Italy
- Weapon: Sabre
- Hand: Right-handed
- Club: CS Carabinieri
- Head coach: Andrea Terenzio
Medal record
Men's sabre
Representing Italy
World Championships
Gold medal – first place	2025 Tbilisi	Team
European Championships
Silver medal – second place	2025 Genoa	Team
European Games
Silver medal – second place	2023 Kraków–Małopolska	Team
Junior World Championships
Gold medal – first place	2018 Verona	Team
Silver medal – second place	2017 Plovdiv	Team
Bronze medal – third place	2018 Verona	Individual
Universiade
Bronze medal – third place	2019 Naples	Individual

Matteo Neri (born 5 May 1999) is an Italian right-handed sabre fencer. He won a gold medal in the men's team sabre event at the 2025 World Fencing Championships.

== Career ==
In June 2025, Neri competed at the 2025 European Fencing Championships and won a silver medal in the team event. The next month he competed at the 2025 World Fencing Championships and won a gold medal in the team sabre event.

== Medal record ==
=== World Championship ===
Year	Location	Event	Position
2025	(Georgia (country)) Tbilisi, Georgia	Team Men's Sabre	1st
