= Fencing at the 2023 European Games – Men's team sabre =

Men's team sabre at the 2023 European Games
- Venue: Tauron Arena Kraków
- Location: Kraków, Poland
- Date: 28 June
- Competitors: 61 from 16 nations
- Teams: 16

Medalists
gold medal	Boladé Apithy; Sébastien Patrice; Maxime Pianfetti; Tom Seitz	France
silver medal	Luca Curatoli; Michele Gallo; Matteo Neri; Luigi Samele	Italy
bronze medal	Raoul Bonah; Lorenz Kempf; Frederic Kindler; Matyas Szabo	Germany

The men's team sabre competition at the 2023 European Games in Kraków was held on 28 June 2023.

== Results ==
=== Main bracket ===
Round of 16
Hungary	45
Azerbaijan	25
Georgia	45
Turkey	36
Ukraine	45
Bulgaria	39
Greece	25
France	45
Germany	45
Iceland	18
Ireland	32
Spain	45
Romania	45
Poland	42
Slovenia	13
Italy	45

Quarterfinals
Hungary	45
Georgia	28
Ukraine	34
France	45
Germany	45
Spain	38
Romania	44
Italy	45

Semifinals
Hungary	42
France	45
Germany	34
Italy	45

Final
France	45
Italy	42
Third place
Hungary	28
Germany	45

=== 5–8th place bracket ===
5–8th place semifinals
Georgia	36
Ukraine	45
Spain	45
Romania	44

Fifth place
Ukraine	44
Spain	45
Seventh place
Georgia	31
Romania	45

=== 9–16th place bracket ===
9–16th place quarterfinals
Azerbaijan	31
Turkey	45
Bulgaria	45
Greece	36
Iceland	45
Ireland	39
Poland	45
Slovenia	11

9–12th place semifinals
Turkey	45
Bulgaria	34
Iceland	21
Poland	45

Ninth place
Turkey	44
Poland	45
Eleventh place
Bulgaria	45
Iceland	34

=== 13–16th place bracket ===
13–16th place semifinals
Azerbaijan	45
Greece	43
Ireland	45
Slovenia	37

13th place
Azerbaijan	45
Ireland	30
15th place
Greece	45
Slovenia	32

== Final ranking ==
Rank	Team	Rank	Team	Rank	Team	Rank	Team
1st place, gold medalist(s)	France; Boladé Apithy; Sébastien Patrice; Maxime Pianfetti; Tom Seitz	5	Spain; Iñaki Bravo; Óscar Fernández; Andrés Hernández; Santiago Madrigal	9	Poland; Szymon Hryciuk; Krzysztof Kaczkowski; Olaf Stasiak; Piotr Szczepanik	13	Azerbaijan; Murad Akbarov; Magsud Huseynli; Aykhan Khasiyev; Saleh Mammadov
2nd place, silver medalist(s)	Italy; Luca Curatoli; Michele Gallo; Matteo Neri; Luigi Samele	6	Ukraine; Bogdan Platonov; Oleksiy Statsenko; Yuriy Tsap; Andriy Yahodka	10	Turkey; Tolga Aslan; Ahmet Turgut Taflan; Furkan Yaman; Enver Yıldırım	14	Ireland; Jadryn Dick; Michael Jacob; Michalis Kirimlidis
3rd place, bronze medalist(s)	Germany; Raoul Bonah; Lorenz Kempf; Frederic Kindler; Matyas Szabo	7	Romania; Matei Cîdu; George Dragomir; Iulian Teodosiu; Răzvan Ursachi	11	Bulgaria; Viktor Filev; Ivan Mandov; Dimitar Raikin; Todor Stoychev	15	Greece; Dimitrios Kafataridis; Panagiotis Kontoeidis; Angelos Pagkalos; Vasileios Predaris
4	Hungary; Tamás Decsi; Csanád Gémesi; András Szatmári; Áron Szilágyi	8	Georgia; Vakhtangi Archvadze; Beka Bazadze; Sandro Bazadze; Goga Kakauridze	12	Iceland; Gunnar Egill Ágústsson; Sævar Baldur Lúðvíksson; Andri Nikolaysson Mateev	16	Slovenia; Lovro Fijavž Bačovnik; Peter Krajnc; Tei Zaviršek Žorž
