= Albania at the 2019 Summer Universiade =

- Flag of Albania
- IOC code: ALB

in Naples, Italy 3 July 2019 – 14 July 2019
- Competitors: 3 (3 men) in 3 sports
- Medals: Gold 0 Silver 0 Bronze 0 Total 0

Summer Universiade appearances
- 1959; 1961; 1963; 1965; 1967; 1970; 1973; 1975; 1977; 1979; 1981; 1983; 1985; 1987; 1989; 1991; 1993; 1995; 1997; 1999; 2001; 2003; 2005; 2007; 2009; 2011; 2013; 2015; 2017; 2019; 2021

Albania competed at the 2019 Summer Universiade in Naples, Italy held from 3 to 14 July 2019.

== Competitors ==
The following is a list of the number of competitors representing Albania that participated at the Games:

Sport	Men	Women	Total
Athletics	1	0	1
Shooting	1	0	1
Taekwondo	1	0	1
Total	3	0	3

== Athletics ==
Key

- Note–Ranks given for track events are within the athlete's heat only
- Q = Qualified for the next round
- q = Qualified for the next round as a fastest loser or, in field events, by position without achieving the qualifying target
- NR = National record
- N/A = Round not applicable for the event
- Bye = Athlete not required to compete in round

Track & road events

Athlete	Event	Heat		Round 1		Semi-finals		Final	
Athlete	Event	Result	Rank	Result	Rank	Result	Rank	Result	Rank
Edmond Murataj	Men's 200 m	DQ		did not advance					

== Shooting ==
Men

Athlete	Event	Qualification		Final	
Athlete	Event	Points	Rank	Points	Rank
Henri Rrufa	10 m air pistol	549	28	did not advance	

== Taekwondo ==
Men

Athlete	Event	Round of 32	Round of 16	Quarterfinal	Semifinal	Final	
Athlete	Event	Opposition Score	Opposition Score	Opposition Score	Opposition Score	Opposition Score	Rank
Valdet Allaraj	–58 kg	Caplea (ROU); L 15–56	did not advance				
