= Dhanalakshmi Sekar =

Indian athlete

Personal information
- Nationality: Indian
- Born: 5 June 1998 (age 27) Gundur, Tiruchirapalli, Tamil Nadu

Sport
- Country: India
- Sport: Athletics
- Event(s): 100m, 200m
- Coached by: Manikandan Arunmugam

Achievements and titles
- Olympic finals: 2020 Summer Olympics

Dhanalakshmi Sekar (born 5 June 1998) is an Indian athlete from Tamil Nadu. She rose to limelight after beating veteran Indian sprinters Dutee Chand and Hima Das in the 200m event at the 2021 Federation Cup. She made her debut appearance at the Olympics representing India at the 2020 Summer Olympics. She was banned for a period of 3 years for failing a doping test in May 2022.

== Biography ==
Danalakshmi was born as the younger child in her family. Her father died at her young age and her mother began working as a domestic labourer to run the family. She has two elder sisters and one of them died in 2021 due to health issues.

== Career ==
She initially wanted to find a decent job for her living and her family. In 2017, she was persuaded and convinced to take up the sport of athletics by former Tamil Nadu sprinter Manikandan Arunmugam.

She competed at the 2018 Tamil Nadu State Championships and claimed third place in both women's 100m and 200m events. She claimed a bronze medal in the women's 200m event at the 2019 Federation Cup. She also clinched a bronze medal in the women's 200m event during the 2019 Inter-State Athletics Championships which was held in Lucknow. During the 2019 Inter-State Championships, she won the gold medal with the Tamil Nadu state team in the women's 4 × 100 m relay event.

She made her debut appearance at the Summer Universiade representing India at the 2019 Summer Universiade and competed in women's 100m, women's 200m women's 4 × 100 metres relay events.

She claimed gold medals in the 100m and 200m events at the 2021 Tamil Nadu State meet which was held in Sivakasi. In March 2021, she broke the women's 200m Federation Cup meet record which was held by legendary sprinter PT Usha for about 23 years. She achieved it after winning the 100m event at the 24th Federation Cup.

She qualified to compete in the mixed 4 × 400 m event at the 2020 Summer Olympics but she didn't find a place in the 4 × 400 m mixed relay event.
