= Morocco at the 2019 Summer Universiade =

- Flag of Morocco
- IOC code: MAR

in Naples, Italy 3 July 2019 – 14 July 2019
- Medals Ranked 32nd: Gold 1 Silver 1 Bronze 1 Total 3

Summer Universiade appearances
- 1959; 1961; 1963; 1965; 1967; 1970; 1973; 1975; 1977; 1979; 1981; 1983; 1985; 1987; 1989; 1991; 1993; 1995; 1997; 1999; 2001; 2003; 2005; 2007; 2009; 2011; 2013; 2015; 2017; 2019; 2021

Morocco competed at the 2019 Summer Universiade in Naples, Italy held from 3 to 14 July 2019. The country won one gold medal, one silver medal and one bronze medal.

== Medal summary ==
=== Medal by sports ===
Medals by sport
Athletics	1	1	0	2
Taekwondo	0	0	1	1
Total	1	1	1	3

=== Medalists ===
Medal	Name	Sport	Event	Date
Gold	Mounaime Sassioui	Athletics	Men's 3000 metres steeplechase	July 12
Silver	Mouad Zahafi	Athletics	Men's 800 metres	July 13
Bronze	Soufiane Elasbi	Taekwondo	Men's –74 kg (lightweight)	July 11
