= Fencing at the 2019 Summer Universiade =

Fencing at the XXX Summer Universiade
- Venue: PalaUniSa (CUS Salerno), Baronissi
- Dates: 4–9 July

Fencing was contested at the 2019 Summer Universiade from 4 to 9 July 2019 at PalaUniSa in Baronissi.

== Medal summary ==
=== Medal table ===
* Host nation (Italy)

Rank	Nation	Gold	Silver	Bronze	Total
1	Italy*	5	3	5	13
2	South Korea	3	1	3	7
3	France	2	2	3	7
4	Russia	1	4	1	6
5	Czech Republic	1	0	0	1
6	Germany	0	2	0	2
7	Poland	0	0	2	2
7	Romania	0	0	2	2
9	Israel	0	0	1	1
9	Japan	0	0	1	1
Totals (10 entries)		12	12	18	42

=== Men's events ===
Event	Gold	Silver	Bronze
Individual épée	Martin Rubeš; Czech Republic	Dmitriy Gusev; Russia	Jang Hyo-min; South Korea
Individual épée	Martin Rubeš; Czech Republic	Dmitriy Gusev; Russia	Wojciech Kolańczyk; Poland
Individual sabre	Oh Sang-uk; South Korea	Frederic Kindler; Germany	Matteo Neri; Italy
Individual sabre	Oh Sang-uk; South Korea	Frederic Kindler; Germany	Răzvan Ursachi; Romania
Individual foil	Damiano Rosatelli; Italy	Guillaume Bianchi; Italy	Meddy Elice; France
Individual foil	Damiano Rosatelli; Italy	Guillaume Bianchi; Italy	Yuto Ueno; Japan
Team épée	South Korea (KOR); Jang Hyo-min; Jang Min-hyeok; Lee Seung-hyun; Seo Jung-min	Russia (RUS); Alan Fardzinov; Dmitriy Gusev; Dmitrii Shvelidze; Artem Tselyshev	Italy (ITA); Lorenzo Buzzi; Valerio Cuomo; Federico Vismara
Team sabre	South Korea (KOR); Choi Min-seo; Jeong Han-gil; Jung Jae-seung; Oh Sang-uk	Germany (GER); Raoul Bonah; Lorenz Kempf; Frederic Kindler	France (FRA); Jean-Philippe Patrice; Sébastien Patrice; Maxime Pianfetti; Wallerand Roger
Team foil	Italy (ITA); Guillaume Bianchi; Francesco Ingargiola; Damiano Rosatelli	South Korea (KOR); Choi Min-seo; Jang Hyo-min; Seo Jung-min; Seo Myeong-cheol	Russia (RUS); Iskander Akhmetov; Alan Fardzinov; Askar Khamzin; Grigoriy Semenyuk

=== Women's events ===
Event	Gold	Silver	Bronze
Individual épée	Alexandra Louis-Marie; France	Evgeniya Zharkova; Russia	Roberta Marzani; Italy
Individual épée	Alexandra Louis-Marie; France	Evgeniya Zharkova; Russia	Nickol Tal; Israel
Individual sabre	Sara Balzer; France	Lucia Lucarini; Italy	Michela Battiston; Italy
Individual sabre	Sara Balzer; France	Lucia Lucarini; Italy	Jeon Su-in; South Korea
Individual foil	Erica Cipressa; Italy	Morgane Patru; France	Camilla Mancini; Italy
Individual foil	Erica Cipressa; Italy	Morgane Patru; France	Mălina Călugăreanu; Romania
Team épée	Russia (RUS); Anna Koroleva; Daria Martynyuk; Maria Obraztsova; Evgeniya Zharkova	Italy (ITA); Eleonora De Marchi; Nicol Foietta; Roberta Marzani	Poland (POL); Anna Mroszczak; Kamila Pytka; Martyna Swatowska; Jagoda Zagała
Team sabre	Italy (ITA); Michela Battiston; Rebecca Gargano; Lucia Lucarini	France (FRA); Sara Balzer; Rozène Castanié; Sarah Noutcha; Margaux Rifkiss	South Korea (KOR); Hong Ha-eun; Jeon Su-in; Kim Jeong-mi; Ko Chae-yeong
Team foil	Italy (ITA); Erica Cipressa; Camilla Mancini; Martina Sinigalia	Russia (RUS); Olga Batenina; Oksana Martinez Jauregui; Daria Martynyuk; Maria Melnikova	France (FRA); Rozène Castanié; Constance Catarzi; Morgane Patru; Margaux Rifkiss
