= Burkina Faso at the 2017 Summer Universiade =

- IOC code: BUR
- NOC: Burkinabé National Olympic and Sports Committee

in Taipei, Taiwan 19 – 30 August 2017
- Competitors: 6 in 2 sports
- Medals Ranked 53rd: Gold 0 Silver 1 Bronze 0 Total 1

Summer Universiade appearances
- 1959; 1961; 1963; 1965; 1967; 1970; 1973; 1975; 1977; 1979; 1981; 1983; 1985; 1987; 1989; 1991; 1993; 1995; 1997; 1999; 2001; 2003; 2005; 2007; 2009; 2011; 2013; 2015; 2017; 2019; 2021; 2025; 2027

Burkina Faso participated at the 2017 Summer Universiade, in Taipei, Taiwan, with 6 competitors from 2 sports.

== Competitors ==
The following table lists Burkina Faso's delegation per sport and gender.

Sport	Men	Women	Total
Athletics	3	1	4
Judo	1	1	2
Total	4	2	6

== Athletics ==
=== Track Events ===
Athlete	Event	Round 1		Round 2		Semifinal		Final	
Athlete	Event	Result	Rank	Result	Rank	Result	Rank	Result	Rank
Bienvenu Wendla Sawadogo	Men's 400m	47.69	4q	—		48.15	8	Did Not Advance	
Florian Tinsa R Some	Men's 110m Hurdles	15.60	6	Did Not Advance					

=== Field Events ===
Athlete	Event	Qualification		Final	
Athlete	Event	Distance	Position	Distance	Position
Hugues Fabrice Zango	Triple Jump	16.21	4q	16.97	2nd place, silver medalist(s)

=== Combined Events ===
Heptathlon

Athlete	Event	100H	HJ	SP	200 m	LJ	JT	800 m	Final	Rank
Christiane Yasm Koala	Result	DNS							N/A	N/A
Christiane Yasm Koala	Points	DNS							N/A	N/A

== Judo ==
Athlete	Event	Round of 64	Round of 32	Round of 16	Quarterfinals	Repechage 32	Repechage 16	Repechage 8	Final Repechage	Semifinals	Final / BM	
Athlete	Event	Opposition Result	Opposition Result	Opposition Result	Opposition Result	Opposition Result	Opposition Result	Opposition Result	Opposition Result	Opposition Result	Opposition Result	Rank
Salimata Da	Women's -48 kg	—	Imene Rezzoug (ALG); L 00–10	did not advance								—
Bernice Brice B Sawadogo	Men's -66 kg	Bye	Simon K M Yacoub (PLE); L 00–10	Did Not Advance								—
