= Albania at the 2017 Summer Universiade =

- IOC code: ALB
- NOC: Albanian National Olympic Committee

in Taipei, Taiwan 19 – 30 August 2017
- Competitors: 2 in 1 sport
- Medals: Gold 0 Silver 0 Bronze 0 Total 0

Summer Universiade appearances
- 1959; 1961; 1963; 1965; 1967; 1970; 1973; 1975; 1977; 1979; 1981; 1983; 1985; 1987; 1989; 1991; 1993; 1995; 1997; 1999; 2001; 2003; 2005; 2007; 2009; 2011; 2013; 2015; 2017; 2019; 2021; 2025; 2027

Albania participated at the 2017 Summer Universiade in Taipei, Taiwan with 2 competitors in 1 sport.

== Athletics ==
=== Men ===
Athlete	Event	Heat		Semifinal		Final	
Athlete	Event	Result	Rank	Result	Rank	Result	Rank
Malvin Nikolla	800 metres	1:54.36	37	did not advance			

=== Women ===
Athlete	Event	Round 1		Round 2		Semifinal		Final	
Athlete	Event	Result	Rank	Result	Rank	Result	Rank	Result	Rank
Iveta Urshini	100 metres	12.89	49	did not advance					
