= Ethiopia at the 2019 Summer Universiade =

- Flag of Ethiopia
- IOC code: ETH

in Naples, Italy 3 July 2019 – 14 July 2019
- Medals: Gold 0 Silver 0 Bronze 1 Total 1

Summer Universiade appearances
- 1959; 1961; 1963; 1965; 1967; 1970; 1973; 1975; 1977; 1979; 1981; 1983; 1985; 1987; 1989; 1991; 1993; 1995; 1997; 1999; 2001; 2003; 2005; 2007; 2009; 2011; 2013; 2015; 2017; 2019; 2021

Ethiopia competed at the 2019 Summer Universiade in Naples, Italy held from 3 to 14 July 2019. The country won one bronze medal, in athletics.

== Medal summary ==
=== Medal by sports ===
Medals by sport
Athletics	0	0	1	1
Total	0	0	1	1

=== Medalists ===
Medal	Name	Sport	Event	Date
Bronze	Meswat Asmare	Athletics	Women's 3000 metres steeplechase	July 11
