= Moldova at the 2019 Summer Universiade =

- Flag of Moldova
- IOC code: MDA

in Naples, Italy 3 July 2019 – 14 July 2019
- Medals Ranked 23rd: Gold 2 Silver 0 Bronze 2 Total 4

Summer Universiade appearances
- 1959; 1961; 1963; 1965; 1967; 1970; 1973; 1975; 1977; 1979; 1981; 1983; 1985; 1987; 1989; 1991; 1993; 1995; 1997; 1999; 2001; 2003; 2005; 2007; 2009; 2011; 2013; 2015; 2017; 2019; 2021; 2025; 2027

Moldova competed at the 2019 Summer Universiade in Naples, Italy held from 3 to 14 July 2019.

== Medal summary ==
=== Medal by sports ===
Medals by sport
Athletics	1	0	0	1
Judo	1	0	1	2
Taekwondo	0	0	1	1

=== Medalists ===
Medal	Name	Sport	Event	Date
Gold	Andrian Mardare	Athletics	Men's javelin throw	July 11
Gold	Denis Vieru	Judo	Men's featherweight (–66 kg)	July 6
Bronze	Dorin Gotonoaga	Judo	Men's welterweight (–81 kg)	July 5
Bronze	Ana Ciuchitu	Taekwondo	Women's welterweight (–67 kg)	July 10
