= Canada at the 2019 Summer Universiade =

- Flag of Canada
- IOC code: CAN

in Naples, Italy 3 July 2019 – 14 July 2019
- Medals: Gold 1 Silver 1 Bronze 4 Total 6

Summer Universiade appearances
- 1959; 1961; 1963; 1965; 1967; 1970; 1973; 1975; 1977; 1979; 1981; 1983; 1985; 1987; 1989; 1991; 1993; 1995; 1997; 1999; 2001; 2003; 2005; 2007; 2009; 2011; 2013; 2015; 2017; 2019; 2021; 2025; 2027

Canada competed at the 2019 Summer Universiade in Naples, Italy held from 3 to 14 July 2019. The country won one gold medal, one silver medal and four bronze medals.

== Medal summary ==
=== Medal by sports ===
Medals by sport
Athletics	1	1	1	3
Diving	0	0	2	2
Swimming	0	0	1	1

=== Medalists ===
Medal	Name	Sport	Event	Date
Gold	Sarah Mitton	Athletics	Women's shot put	July 11
Silver	Nicole Hutchinson	Athletics	Women's 5000 metres	July 12
Bronze	Courtney Hufsmith	Athletics	Women's 1500 metres	July 13
Bronze	Laurent Gosselin-Paradis	Diving	Men's 10 metre platform	July 8
Bronze	Laurent Gosselin-Paradis; Ethan Pitman	Diving	Men's synchronized 10 metre platform	July 5
Bronze	Ingrid Wilm; Nina Kucheran; Hannah Genich; Ainsley McMurray; Sophie Angus*; Sarah Watson*	Swimming	Women's 4 × 100 m medley relay	July 10
