= Jessica-Bianca Wessolly =

German sprinter (born 1996)

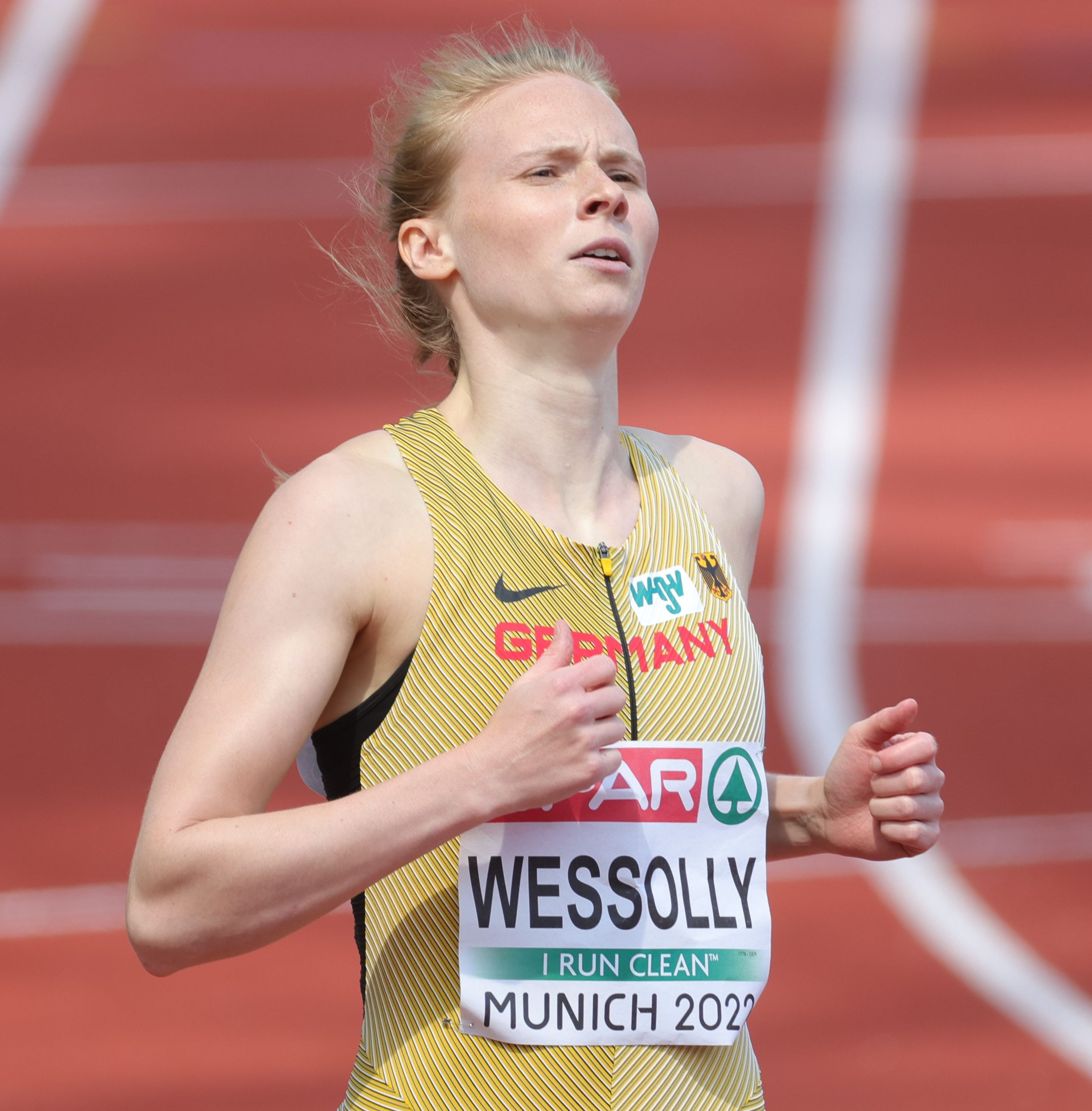
- Wessolly in 2022

Personal information
- Born: 11 December 1996 (age 29) Mannheim, Germany
- Education: Heidelberg University of Education
- Height: 1.68 m (5 ft 6 in)
- Weight: 56 kg (123 lb)

Sport
- Sport: Athletics
- Event(s): 100 m, 200 m
- Club: MTG Mannheim
- Coached by: Michael Manke-Reimers
Medal record
European Championships
Gold medal – first place	2022 Munich	4 × 100 m relay

Jessica-Bianca Wessolly (born 11 December 1996 in Mannheim) is a German sprinter. She won a silver medal in the 200 metres at the 2019 Summer Universiade and has been the European Champion with the German 4 × 100 metres relay team since 2022.

== International competitions ==
Year	Competition	Venue	Position	Event	Notes
Representing Germany
2017	European U23 Championships	Bydgoszcz, Poland	–	4 × 100 m relay	DNF
2018	World Cup	London, United Kingdom	4th	200 m	23.19
2018	World Cup	London, United Kingdom	4th	4 × 400 m relay	43.04
2018	European Championships	Berlin, Germany	12th (sf)	200 m	23.26
2019	World Relays	Yokohama, Japan	5th	4 × 200 m relay	1:34.92
2019	Universiade	Naples, Italy	14th (h)	100 m	11.66^{1}
2019	Universiade	Naples, Italy	2nd	200 m	23.05
2019	Universiade	Naples, Italy	6th	4 × 400 m relay	3:34.66
2019	World Championships	Doha, Qatar	21st (sf)	200 m	23.37
2019	World Championships	Doha, Qatar	5th	4 × 100 m relay	42.48
2021	Olympic Games	Tokyo, Japan	32nd (h)	200 m	23.41
2022	World Championships	Eugene, United States	22nd (sf)	200 m	23.33
2022	European Championships	Munich, Germany	17th (sf)	200 m	23.47
2022	European Championships	Munich, Germany	1st	4 × 100 m relay	42.34^{2}
2022	European Championships	Munich, Germany	8th (h)	4 × 400 m relay	3:27.92
2024	European Championships	Rome, Italy	18th (sf)	200 m	23.27
2025	World Championships	Tokyo, Japan	38th (h)	200 m	23.33

^{1}Did not start in the semi-final
^{2}Starts only in Round 1 / Heat 2 (43.33 Q); competitors who run in the qualifying rounds, but not in the final, will also receive the medal as part of the team
Abbreviations: h = heat (Q, q), sf = semi-final

== Personal bests ==
Outdoor

- 100 metres – 11.36 (+0.6 m/s, Mannheim 2019)
- 200 metres – 22.50 (-0.6 m/s, La Chaux-de-Fonds 2024)

Indoor

- 60 metres – 7.41 (Mannheim 2021)
- 200 metres – 23.07 (Mannheim 2021)
