= Sailing at the 2019 Summer Universiade =

Sailing at the XXX Summer Universiade
- Venue: Circolo Italia
- Dates: 8–12 July

Sailing was contested at the 2019 Summer Universiade from 8 to 12 July 2019 at the Circolo Italia in Naples.

Singapore won its second ever medal at the Universiade in this event.

== Medal summary ==
=== Medal table ===
* Host nation (Italy)

Rank	Nation	Gold	Silver	Bronze	Total
1	Finland	1	0	0	1
2	Austria	0	1	0	1
3	Singapore	0	0	1	1
Totals (3 entries)		1	1	1	3

== Events ==
Event	Gold	Silver	Bronze
Match race	Finland (FIN); Alexander Grönblom; Oskari Muhonen; Catharina Sandman; Cecilia Sandman	Austria (AUT); Johanna Daum; Stefan Scharnagl; Luis Wenger-Oehn; Hannah Ziegler	Singapore (SGP); Scott Lan; Jillian Lee; Tan Jen-e; Cheryl Teo
