= Albania at the 2021 Summer World University Games =

- Flag of Albania
- IOC code: ALB

in Chengdu, China 28 July 2023 – 8 August 2023
- Competitors: 2 (1 man and 1 woman)
- Medals: Gold 0 Silver 0 Bronze 0 Total 0

Summer World University Games appearances
- 1959; 1961; 1963; 1965; 1967; 1970; 1973; 1975; 1977; 1979; 1981; 1983; 1985; 1987; 1989; 1991; 1993; 1995; 1997; 1999; 2001; 2003; 2005; 2007; 2009; 2011; 2013; 2015; 2017; 2019; 2021; 2025; 2027

Albania competed at the 2021 Summer World University Games in Chengdu, China held from 28 July to 8 August 2023.

== Competitors ==
Sport	Men	Women	Total
Table tennis	1	1	2

== Table tennis ==
Athlete	Event	Group round				Round of 64	Round of 32	Round of 16	Quarterfinal	Semifinal	Final / BM	
Athlete	Event	Opposition Result	Opposition Result	Opposition Result	Rank	Opposition Result	Opposition Result	Opposition Result	Opposition Result	Opposition Result	Opposition Result	Rank
Sadush Tosuni	Men's singles	Al Mandhari (OMA); L 1–3	Yılmaz (TUR); L 0–3	—	3	Did not advance						
Liridona Rexhaj	Women's singles	Soo (HKG); L 0–3	Zulu (ZAM); W 3–0 (w/o)	Amah (NGR); W 3–0 (w/o)	2 Q	Lee (KOR); L 0–4	Did not advance					
