= Men's team sabre at the 2025 World Fencing Championships =

- Venue: Olympic Palace
- Location: Tbilisi, Georgia
- Dates: 27 July (preliminaries); 28 July (finals)
- Competitors: 121 from 32 nations
- Teams: 32

Medalists
gold medal	Luca Curatoli; Michele Gallo; Matteo Neri; Pietro Torre	Italy
silver medal	Csanád Gémesi; Nikolász Iliász; Krisztián Rabb; Áron Szilágyi	Hungary
bronze medal	Vlad Covaliu; George Dragomir; Radu Nițu; Răzvan Ursachi	Romania

The Men's team sabre competition at the 2025 World Fencing Championships was held on 27 and 28 July 2025.

== Draw ==
=== Finals ===
Semifinals
Japan	36
Italy	45
Hungary	45
Romania	40

Final
Italy	45
Hungary	37
Third place
Japan	41
Romania	45

=== Top half ===
==== Section 1 ====
Round of 32
South Korea	45
Jordan	27
Kazakhstan	34
Hong Kong	45
Japan	45
Brazil	22
India	45
Canada	42

Round of 16
South Korea	45
Hong Kong	35
Japan	45
India	35

Quarterfinals
South Korea	40
Japan	45

==== Section 2 ====
Round of 32
Italy	45
Thailand	29
Saudi Arabia	33
Germany	45
Poland	45
Uzbekistan	40
Australia	25
United States	45

Round of 16
Italy	45
Germany	39
Poland	45
United States	44

Quarterfinals
Italy	45
Poland	28

=== Bottom half ===
==== Section 3 ====
Round of 32
Hungary	45
United Arab Emirates	18
Ukraine	28
Georgia	45
China	45
Bulgaria	31
Mexico	28
Egypt	45

Round of 16
Hungary	45
Georgia	36
China	45
Egypt	44

Quarterfinals
Hungary	45
China	34

==== Section 4 ====
Round of 32
Iran	43
Individual Neutral Athletes	45
Venezuela	23
Romania	45
Turkey	45
Spain	32
Azerbaijan	19
France	45

Round of 16
Individual Neutral Athletes	38
Romania	45
Turkey	34
France	45

Quarterfinals
Romania	45
France	39

=== Placement rounds ===
==== 5–8th place bracket ====
5–8th place semifinals
South Korea	45
Poland	40
China	40
France	45

Fifth place
South Korea	41
France	45
Seventh place
Poland	42
China	45

==== 9–16th place bracket ====
9–16th place quarterfinals
Hong Kong	35
India	45
Germany	38
United States	45
Georgia	31
Egypt	45
Individual Neutral Athletes	45
Turkey	35

9–12th place semifinals
India	23
United States	45
Egypt	45
Individual Neutral Athletes	34

Ninth place
United States	45
Egypt	37
Eleventh place
India	30
Individual Neutral Athletes	45

==== 13–16th place bracket ====
13–16th place semifinals
Hong Kong	37
Germany	45
Georgia	45
Turkey	38

13th place
Germany	45
Georgia	30
15th place
Hong Kong	42
Turkey	45

== Final ranking ==
Rank	Team
1st place, gold medalist(s)	Italy
2nd place, silver medalist(s)	Hungary
3rd place, bronze medalist(s)	Romania
4	Japan
5	France
6	South Korea
7	China
8	Poland
9	United States
10	Egypt
11	Individual Neutral Athletes
12	India
13	Germany
14	Georgia
15	Turkey
16	Hong Kong
17	Iran
18	Canada
19	Kazakhstan
20	Spain
21	Ukraine
22	Uzbekistan
23	Saudi Arabia
24	Bulgaria
25	Venezuela
26	Brazil
27	Mexico
28	Thailand
29	Australia
30	United Arab Emirates
31	Azerbaijan
32	Jordan
