= Algeria at the 2017 Summer Universiade =

- IOC code: ALG
- NOC: Algerian Olympic Committee

in Taipei, Taiwan 19 – 30 August 2017
- Competitors: 33 in 3 sports
- Medals Ranked 47th: Gold 0 Silver 3 Bronze 2 Total 5

Summer Universiade appearances
- 1959; 1961; 1963; 1965; 1967; 1970; 1973; 1975; 1977; 1979; 1981; 1983; 1985; 1987; 1989; 1991; 1993; 1995; 1997; 1999; 2001; 2003; 2005; 2007; 2009; 2011; 2013; 2015; 2017; 2019; 2021; 2025; 2027

Algeria participated at the 2017 Summer Universiade in Taipei, Taiwan with 33 competitors in 3 sport.

Since 1963, Algeria has taken part at every Summer World University Games with the exception of 1977 Summer Universiade in Sofia and the 1987 Summer Universiade in Zagreb because of the African boycott.

== Athletics ==
=== Men ===
==== Track Events ====
Athlete	Event	Round 1		Round 2		Semifinal		Final	
Athlete	Event	Result	Rank	Result	Rank	Result	Rank	Result	Rank
Skander Djamil Athmani	100m	10.49	1Q	10.44	2Q	10.44	6	did not advance	
Skander Djamil Athmani	200m	21.21	2Q	—N/a		21.21	3	did not advance	
Mohamed Islem Bekar	400m	DSQ	6	—N/a		did not advance			
Ramzi Abdenouz	800m	1:51:26	4q	—N/a		1:49.94	5	did not advance	
Mohamed Belbachir	800m	1:51.16	2Q	—N/a		1:48.30	2Q	1:46.73	2nd place, silver medalist(s)
Takieddine Hedeilli	1500m	3:44.49	5q	—N/a				3:46.87	8
Abderezak Khelili	1500m	3:51.45	7	—N/a				did not advance	
Aimen Hami	5000m	15:34.82	14	—N/a				did not advance	
Takieddine Hedeilli	5000m	DNS	N/A	—N/a				did not advance	
Saber Boukmouche	400m Hurdles	51.88	3Q	—N/a		51.63	7	did not advance	
Abdelmalik Lahoulou	400m Hurdles	50.80	2Q	—N/a		49.62	2Q	49.30	3rd place, bronze medalist(s)
Ali Messaoudi	3000m Steeplechase	—N/a						8:37.14	3rd place, bronze medalist(s)

==== Field Events ====
Athlete	Event	Qualification		Final	
Athlete	Event	Distance	Position	Distance	Position
Hichem-Khalil Cherabi	Pole Vault	5.10	6	did not advance	
Yasser Triki	Triple Jump	16.24	1Q	16.60	5
Yasser Triki	Long Jump	7.71	5q	7.96	2nd place, silver medalist(s)

=== Women ===
==== Track Events ====
Athlete	Event	Round 1		Round 2		Semifinal		Final	
Athlete	Event	Result	Rank	Result	Rank	Result	Rank	Result	Rank
Dihia Haddar	800m	2:05.07	5q	—N/a		2:05.46	8	did not advance	
Faten Laribi	800m	2:12.41	7	—N/a		did not advance			
Dihia Haddar	400m Hurdles	DNF	N/A	—N/a		did not advance			

==== Field Events ====
Athlete	Event	Qualification		Final	
Athlete	Event	Distance	Position	Distance	Position
Tahani Roumaiss Belabiod	Long Jump	6.12	4q	6.10	9

== Judo ==
=== Men ===
Athlete	Event	1/32 Final	1/16 Final	1/8 Final	1/4 Final	Repechage 16	Repechage 8	Final Repechage	Semifinal	Final / BM	
Athlete	Event	Opposition Score	Opposition Score	Opposition Score	Opposition Score	Opposition Score	Opposition Score	Opposition Score	Opposition Score	Opposition Score	Rank
Sofiane Bennaceur	-100 kg	—N/a	Danylo Hutsol (UKR); L 00S1–01	did not advance							N/A
Reda Bougueroua	-73 kg	Bye	Sam Nicholas King (AUS); W 12–00S1	Norin Tatarescu (MDA); W 12–00	Alejandro Feder Clara (ARG); W 10S2–00S3	Bye			Arata Tatasukawa (JPN); L 10–00H	Bekadil Shaimerdenov (KAZ); L 01S1–00	5
Sami Bouhbal	+100 kg	—N/a	Bye	Kunathip Yea-On (THA); W 10S1–00	Youngseo Ju (KOR); L 00S3–11	Bye	Kamil Jozef Grabowski (POL); L 12–00S2	did not advance			N/A
Sami Bouhbal	Open	—N/a	Rokas Nenartavicius (LTU); L 10–00	did not advance							N/A
Imad Eddine Kacimi	-81 kg	—N/a	German Duran (EST); L 10S1–00	did not advance							N/A
Abdelkrim Moura Ladj	-66 kg	Andreas Tiefgraber (AUT); L 00S2–00	did not advance								N/A
Sid Ali Mechemache	-90 kg	Bye	Tomas Spikermann (ARG); L 01–11	did not advance							N/A

=== Women ===
Athlete	Event	1/32 Final	1/16 Final	1/8 Final	1/4 Final	Repechage 16	Repechage 8	Final Repechage	Semifinal	Final / BM	
Athlete	Event	Opposition Score	Opposition Score	Opposition Score	Opposition Score	Opposition Score	Opposition Score	Opposition Score	Opposition Score	Opposition Score	Rank
Imene Agouar	-70 kg	Bye	Saki Niizoe (JPN); L 11–00	Bye			Seongyeon Kim (KOR); L 00S1–01S2	did not advance			N/A
Faiza Aissahine	-52 kg	—N/a	Damla Caliskan (TUR); W 11S1–00	Da Sol Park (KOR); L 00S1–01	Bye		Mariana Esteves (POR); L 00–11	did not advance			N/A
Amina Blekadi	-52 kg	—N/a	Larissa Carmen Csatari (SUI); W 01S2–00	Hannah Tadako Tsutsui (USA); W 00–10	Caroline Marie Peschaud (FRA); W 10S1–00	Bye			Nadja Bazynski (GER); W 00–01	Aimi Nouchi (JPN); L 00S1–11	2nd place, silver medalist(s)
Yamina Halata	-57 kg	—N/a	Megumi Patricia Naito Vidal (CHI); W 00-11S1	Miranda Akari Imamura (USA); W 02S1-00S2	Anna Righetti (ITA); L 00-02S1	Bye	Oana Nicolaescu (ROU); L 12-00S1	did not advance			N/A
Imene Rezzoug	-48 kg	—N/a	Salimata Da (BUR); W 00-10	Catarina Costa (POR); W 00S1-01	did not advance						N/A
Amina Temmar	-78 kg	—N/a	Bye	Nadege Iziguriza (BDI); W 00-10	Valeria Ferrari (ITA); L 00S1-01	—N/a	Bye	Madeleine Kell Malonga (FRA); L 10S1-01	did not advance		N/A

== Swimming ==
=== Men ===
Athlete	Event	Heat		Semifinal		Final	
Athlete	Event	Time	Rank	Time	Rank	Time	Rank
Nassim Aboub	100m Backstroke	1:00.93	50	did not advance			
Nassim Aboub	50m Backstroke	28.20	52	did not advance			
Mehdi Nazim Benbara	100m Backstroke	DNS	N/A	did not advance			
Mehdi Nazim Benbara	50m Backstroke	DNS	N/A	did not advance			
Mehdi Nazim Benbara	100m Freestyle	DNS	N/A	did not advance			
Mehdi Nazim Benbara	50m Freestyle	DNS	N/A	did not advance			
Mohamed El Was Chelbeb	200m Freestyle	DNS	N/A	did not advance			
Mohamed El Was Chelbeb	100m Freestyle	53.41	72	did not advance			
Mohamed El Was Chelbeb	100m Butterfly	DNS	N/A	did not advance			
Mohamed El Was Chelbeb	50m Freestyle	24.59	63	did not advance			
Mahieddine Galdem	50m Butterfly	26.21	59	did not advance			
Mahieddine Galdem	100m Butterfly	56.69	N/A	did not advance			

=== Women ===
Athlete	Event	Heat		Semifinal		Final	
Athlete	Event	Time	Rank	Time	Rank	Time	Rank
Sara Moualfi	100m Freestyle	DNS	N/A	did not advance			
Sara Moualfi	200m Freestyle	2:14.32	43	did not advance			
Sara Moualfi	800m Freestyle	9:38.02	25	did not advance			
Sara Moualfi	400m Freestyle	4:40.35	33	did not advance			
Hamida Rania Nefsi	400m Individual Medley	DNS	N/A	did not advance			
Hamida Rania Nefsi	200m Individual Medley	DNS	N/A	did not advance			
