= Lithuania at the 2019 Summer Universiade =

- Flag of Lithuania
- IOC code: LTU

in Naples, Italy 3 July 2019 – 14 July 2019
- Medals Ranked 29th: Gold 1 Silver 1 Bronze 2 Total 4

Summer Universiade appearances
- 1959; 1961; 1963; 1965; 1967; 1970; 1973; 1975; 1977; 1979; 1981; 1983; 1985; 1987; 1989; 1991; 1993; 1995; 1997; 1999; 2001; 2003; 2005; 2007; 2009; 2011; 2013; 2015; 2017; 2019; 2021; 2025; 2027

Lithuania competed at the 2019 Summer Universiade in Naples, Italy held from 3 to 14 July 2019. The country won one gold medal, one silver medal and two bronze medals, all in athletics.

== Medal summary ==
=== Medal by sports ===
Medals by sport
Athletics	1	1	2	4
Total	1	1	2	4

=== Medalists ===
Medal	Name	Sport	Event	Date
Gold	Liveta Jasiūnaitė	Athletics	Women's javelin throw	July 10
Silver	Edis Matusevičius	Athletics	Men's javelin throw	July 11
Bronze	Ieva Zarankaitė	Athletics	Women's discus throw	July 9
Bronze	Adrijus Glebauskas	Athletics	Men's high jump	July 10
