= Algeria at the 2019 Summer Universiade =

- Flag of Algeria
- IOC code: ALG

in Naples, Italy 3 July 2019 – 14 July 2019
- Medals Ranked 40th: Gold 1 Silver 0 Bronze 0 Total 1

Summer Universiade appearances
- 1959; 1961; 1963; 1965; 1967; 1970; 1973; 1975; 1977; 1979; 1981; 1983; 1985; 1987; 1989; 1991; 1993; 1995; 1997; 1999; 2001; 2003; 2005; 2007; 2009; 2011; 2013; 2015; 2017; 2019; 2021; 2025; 2027

Algeria competed at the 2019 Summer Universiade in Naples, Italy held from 3 to 14 July 2019. The country won one gold medal, in athletics.

Since 1963, Algeria has taken part at every Summer World University Games with the exception of 1977 Summer Universiade in Sofia and the 1987 Summer Universiade in Zagreb because of the African boycott.

== Medal summary ==
=== Medal by sports ===
Medals by sport
Athletics	1	0	0	1
Total	1	0	0	1

=== Medalists ===
Medal	Name	Sport	Event	Date
Gold	Mohamed Belbachir	Athletics	Men's 800 metres	July 13
