= Belarus at the 2019 Summer Universiade =

- Flag of Belarus
- IOC code: BLR

in Naples, Italy 3 July 2019 – 14 July 2019
- Medals: Gold 1 Silver 3 Bronze 1 Total 5

Summer Universiade appearances
- 1959; 1961; 1963; 1965; 1967; 1970; 1973; 1975; 1977; 1979; 1981; 1983; 1985; 1987; 1989; 1991; 1993; 1995; 1997; 1999; 2001; 2003; 2005; 2007; 2009; 2011; 2013; 2015; 2017; 2019; 2021; 2025; 2027

Belarus competed at the 2019 Summer Universiade in Naples, Italy held from 3 to 14 July 2019. The country won one gold medal, three silver medals and one bronze medal.

== Medal summary ==
=== Medal by sports ===
Medals by sport
Athletics	1	0	0	1
Gymnastics	0	3	0	3
Swimming	0	0	1	1
Total	1	3	1	5
