= Czech Republic at the 2019 Summer Universiade =

- Flag of the Czech Republic
- IOC code: CZE

in Naples, Italy 3 July 2019 – 14 July 2019
- Medals Ranked 20th: Gold 2 Silver 2 Bronze 2 Total 6

Summer Universiade appearances (overview)
- 1993; 1995; 1997; 1999; 2001; 2003; 2005; 2007; 2009; 2011; 2013; 2015; 2017; 2019; 2021; 2025; 2027

Czech Republic competed at the 2019 Summer Universiade in Naples, Italy held from 3 to 14 July 2019.

== Medal summary ==
=== Medal by sports ===
Medals by sport
Athletics	0	1	1	2
Fencing	1	0	0	1
Shooting	1	0	1	2
Tennis	0	1	0	1
