= Kosovo University Sports Federation =

Governing body of university sports in Kosovo

- Sport: Universiade
- Jurisdiction: Kosovo
- Affiliation: International University Sports Federation
- Affiliation date: 2017
- Regional affiliation: European University Sports Association
- Affiliation date: 2017
- President: Dielza Keljmendi

Official website
- fsunk-kos.org
- (Kosovo)

The Kosovo University Sports Federation, (Albanian: Federata e Sporteve Universitare të Kosovës, Serbian: Савез Универзитетског Cпорта Косова / Savez Univerzitetskog Sporta Kosova), is governing body for university sports in Kosovo.

== History ==
The Kosovo University Sports Federation became a member of the International University Sports Federation in 2017 and a delegation representing Kosovo made its debut at the 2019 Summer Universiade.

== Events Hosted ==
The Kosovo University Sports Federation has hosted the following FISU events:

- 2022 FISU University Handball World Cup

== See also ==
- List of universities in Kosovo
