= Georgia Hulls =

New Zealand athlete

Personal information
- Born: 27 August 1999 (age 27) Maidstone, England
- Height: 199 cm (6 ft 6 in)
- Weight: 60 kg (132 lb)

Sport
- Country: New Zealand
- Sport: Track and field
- Events: 100 m; 200 m; 400 m

Achievements and titles
- National finals: 200 m champion (2021, 2022, 2023,2024); 400 m champion (2019)
Medal record
Women's athletics
Representing NZ
Oceania Championships
Gold medal – first place	2022 Mackay	200 m
Gold medal – first place	2022 Mackay	4 × 400 m relay
Gold medal – first place	2024 Suva	4 × 100 m relay
Universiade
Bronze medal – third place	2019 Naples	4x100m relay

Georgia Hulls (born 27 August 1999) is a New Zealand sprinter with multiple national and Oceania titles who has represented her country at the World Athletics Championships.

== Early life ==
Hulls is from Hawke's Bay where she attended Havelock North High School. She competed for New Zealand in Cali, Colombia at the 2015 World Youth Championships in Athletics and at the 2016 IAAF World U20 Championships held in Bydgoszcz, Poland.

== Career ==
Hulls moved to live in Auckland to study accounting at Massey University’s Academy of Sport and to train with a cluster of New Zealand's young aspiration athletes based there. In her first year as a senior athlete she won the 2019 New Zealand national championships title over 400 metres before finishing as runner-up to Zoe Hobbs in the 200 m the following day. Hulls came third in the 100 m at the 2019 Oceania Athletics Championships, and, with Zoe Hobbs, Natasha Eady and Olivia Eaton, she also won bronze in the 4 × 100 m relay at the 2019 Summer Universiade held in Napoli, Italy.

Hulls ran the third leg alongside Livvy Wilson, Zoe Hobbs and Rosie Elliott as part of the team that broke the New Zealand senior women's 4 x 100m relay national record in Canberra in February 2020. Hulls ran a then personal best 200 m time of 23.17 seconds to win the Australian championships on 2 April 2022. She had run a wind assisted 200 m in 23.10 to win the New Zealand 200 m national championships the previous month. Hulls won gold in the 200 m and the 4 × 400 m relay at the 2022 Oceania Athletics Championships. Hulls competed for New Zealand at the 2022 World Athletics Championships held in Eugene, United States.

On 19 February 2023, Hulls lowered her personal best 200 m time, running 22.84 in finishing 2nd at the International Track Meet in Christchurch. The time beat the previous NZ record, but the record fell to the race winner Rosie Elliott. Hulls competed at the 200 metres at the 2023 World Athletics Championships in Budapest in August 2023.

Hulls won the 200 metres title ahead of Rosie Elliott at the 2024 New Zealand Athletics Championships in Wellington. In June, she was a member of the New Zealand women's 4 x 100 metres relay team which won gold at the 2024 Oceania Athletics Championships in Suva, Fiji, alongside Amelie Fairclough, Brooke Somerfield and Marielle Venida.

She was selected for the New Zealand team to compete at the 2026 World Athletics Relays in Gaborone, Botswana.

== Personal life ==
Her grandmother Jean Hulls (née Adamson) was among Britain's best multi-discipline athletes winning silver medals in the pentathlon at the England women's athletics championship in 1958 and 1959.
