= Gundur, Mahabubnagar district =

Gundur Gundoor
- village
- Country: India
- State: Telangana
- District: Mahabubnagar

Government
  - Type: Panchayat Raj

Population (2001)
  - Total: 6,506

Languages
  - Official: Telugu
- Time zone: UTC+5:30 (IST)

Gundur is a village in Kalwakurthy taluk of Mahabubnagar district, Telangana, India.

== Demographics ==
As per the 2001 census, Gundur had a population of 6,506 with 3,311 males and 3,195 females. The sex ratio was 965 and the literacy rate, 80.64.

As per constitution of India and Panchyati Raaj Act, Gundur village is administrated by Sarpanch (Head of Village) who is elected representative of village.

== Census Details ( 2011) ==
Gundur Local Language is Telugu. Gundur Village Total population is 2249 and number of houses are 540. Female Population is 49.7%. Village literacy rate is 51.7% and the Female Literacy rate is 19.8%.

== Nearby Places ==
Panjugula ( 4 KM ), Suddakal ( 4 KM ), Polmoor ( 5 KM ), Mukurala ( 5 KM ), Nadigadda ( 7 KM ) are the nearby Villages to Gundur. Gundur is surrounded by Tadoor Mandal towards west, Telkapalle Mandal towards South, Vangoor Mandal towards East, Nagarkurnool Mandal towards west.
