= Brooke Somerfield =

New Zealand athlete (born 1997)

Personal information
- Born: 5 May 1997 (age 29)

Sport
- Country: New Zealand
- Sport: Athletics
- Events: 100 m; 200 m

Achievements and titles
- National finals: 200 m champion (2026)
- Personal bests: 60m: 7.59 (2026); 100m: 11.49 (2025); 200m: 23.49 (2025)
Medal record
Women's athletics
Representing NZ
Oceania Championships
| Gold medal – first place | 2024 Suva | 4 × 100 m relay |
| Silver medal – second place | 2022 Mackay | 4 × 100 m relay |
Universiade
| Bronze medal – third place | 2019 Naples | 4x100m relay |

Brooke Somerfield (born 5 May 1997) is a New Zealand sprinter. She won the New Zealand national championships over 200 metres in 2026.

== Biography ==
A member of Athletics Tauranga, Somerfield attended Tauranga Girls' College. Competing at the 2016 IAAF World U20 Championships she was part of a 4 x 100 metres relay team which set a senior and U20 national record, only to be disqualified for a lane infringement. The Waikato/Bay of Plenty senior 100m sprint champion in 2019, Somerfield was a member of the New Zealand team which won the bronze medal in the 4 × 100 m relay at the 2019 Summer Universiade held in Napoli, Italy.

In June 2022, she was a silver medalist in the 4 x 100 metres at the 2022 Oceania Athletics Championships. Running for Waikato Bay of Plenty, she ran 11.51 seconds to place third over 100 metres at the 2023 New Zealand Athletics Championships. In March 2024, Somerfield was second in 11.55 seconds in the 100 metres at the New Zealand Championships. In June, she won the gold medal with the New Zealand women's 4 x 100 metres relay alongside Amelie Fairclough, Georgia Hulls and Marielle Venida at the 2024 Oceania Athletics Championships in Suva, Fiji.

In March 2025, Somerfield was second in a personal best 11.49 seconds (+1.3 m/s) in the 100 metres at the New Zealand Championships in Dunedin. The following week, she also ran a personal best over 200 metres, running 23.49 seconds in Brisbane.

In February 2026, Somerfield was part of a New Zealand 4 x 100 metres relay team which set a national record time of 43.24 seconds. Somerfield won the New Zealand national championships over 200 metres in March 2026, also placing second over 100 metres behind Zoe Hobbs. On 4 April at the Mt Smart Stadium she was part of a mixed 4 x 100 metres relay team alongside Tiaan Whelpton, Lex Revell-Lewis and Hobbs which ran a time of 41.30 seconds to set a New Zealand national record and move to joint eleventh on the World Athletics rankings. She was subsequently selected for the New Zealand team to compete at the 2026 World Athletics Relays in Gaborone, Botswana.
