= Kosovo at the 2019 Summer Universiade =

- IOC code: KOS
- NOC: Kosovo University Sports Federation
- Website: https://fsunk-kos.org

in Naples, Italy 3 – 14 July 2019
- Competitors: 1 in 1 sport
- Flag bearer: Rita Hajdini
- Medals: Gold 0 Silver 0 Bronze 0 Total 0

Summer Universiade appearances (overview)
- 1959; 1961; 1963; 1965; 1967; 1970; 1973; 1975; 1977; 1979; 1981; 1983; 1985; 1987; 1989; 1991; 1993; 1995; 1997; 1999; 2001; 2003; 2005; 2007; 2009; 2011; 2013; 2015; 2017; 2019; 2021

Kosovo was represented at the 2019 Summer Universiade in Naples, Italy, the 30th edition of the multi-sport event organised by the International University Sports Federation. It marked Kosovo's debut appearance at the Universiade.

In total, one athlete, Rita Hajdini, represented Kosovo in one sport: athletics. She was entered in two events but only contested one, failing to progress past the heats.

== Background ==
The 2019 Summer Universiade in Naples, Italy took place between 3 and 14 July 2019. It was the 30th Summer Universiade. Kosovo had never before competed at the Universiade. Previously, Kosovar athletes would have been eligible to compete as part of the Socialist Federal Republic of Yugoslavia from 1961 to 1991, the Federal Republic of Yugoslavia from 1991 to 2003, Serbia and Montenegro from 2003 to 2006 and Serbia from 2006 to 2019. Previously, Serbia hosted 2009 Summer Universiade in Belgrade.

== Competitors ==
Kosovo was represented by one competitor, Rita Hajdini, who was entered in two athletics events – the women's 400 m and 800 m.

== Athletics ==
In total, one Kosovar athlete participated in the athletics events – Rita Hajdini in the women's 400 m and the women's 800 m.

The athletics events took place at the Stadio San Paolo in Naples from 8 to 13 July 2017.

The heats for the women's 400 m took place on 8 July 2019 at 9 am. Hajdini contested heat one. She finished seventh in her heat in a time of one minute one second. She did not advance to the semi-finals.

The heats for the women's 800 m took place later the same day, 8 July 2019, at 5:30 pm. Hajdini was due to contest heat one. She did not start the event.

== See also ==
- Kosovo at the Universiade
- Kosovo University Sports Federation
