= Jacob Simonsen =

Danish long-distance runner

Personal information
- Full name: Jacob Sommer Simonsen
- Born: 1 January 1995 (age 30)

Sport
- Country: Denmark
- Sport: Long-distance running

Jacob Sommer Simonsen (born 1 January 1995) is a Danish long-distance runner.

In 2019, he competed in the senior men's race at the 2019 IAAF World Cross Country Championships held in Aarhus, Denmark. He finished in 93rd place. In the same year, he also represented Denmark at the 2019 Summer Universiade held in Naples, Italy. He finished in 13th place in the men's half marathon and he won the bronze medal in the men's marathon team event.

He is the current national record holder on the men's marathon distance after running the BMW Berlin Marathon on 29 Sep 2024 in 2:07:51. Thus beating the previous record set by Henrik Jørgensen in 1985 by one minute and 52 seconds.
