= Lisa-Marie Kwayie =

German sprinter (born 1996)

Lisa Marie Kwayie
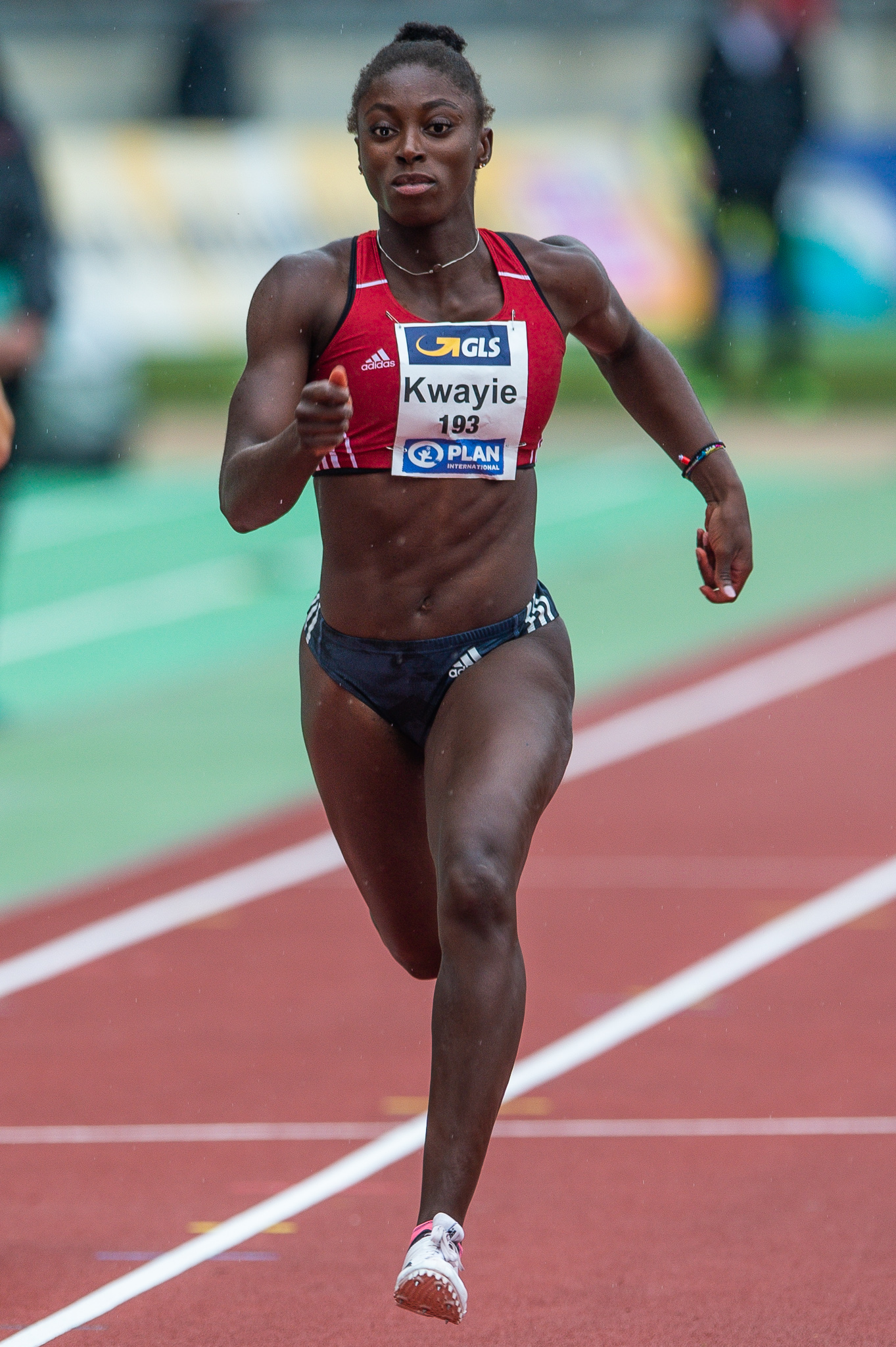
- Kwayie in 2018

Personal information
- Born: 27 October 1996 (age 29) Sunyani, Ghana
- Height: 1.73 m (5 ft 8 in)
- Weight: 62 kg (137 lb)

Sport
- Sport: Athletics
- Event: 100 metres
- Club: Neuköllner SF
- Coached by: Frank Paul
Medal record
Women's athletics
Representing Germany
World Championships
Bronze medal – third place	2018 Berlin	4 × 100 m relay

Lisa Marie Kwayie (born 27 October 1996) is a German sprinter. She won a bronze medal in the 4 × 100 metres relay at the 2018 European Championships.

== International competitions ==
Year	Competition	Venue	Position	Event	Notes
Representing Germany
2014	World Junior Championships	Eugene, United States	32nd (h)	100 m	11.95
2014	World Junior Championships	Eugene, United States	3rd	4 × 100 m relay	44.65
2017	European U23Championships	Bydgoszcz, Poland	9th (sf)	100 m	11.57
2017	European U23Championships	Bydgoszcz, Poland	–	4 × 100 m relay	DNF
2018	World Cup	London, United Kingdom	8th	100 m	11.46
2018	World Cup	London, United Kingdom	4th	4 × 100 m relay	43.04
2018	European Championships	Berlin, Germany	14th (sf)	100 m	11.36
2018	European Championships	Berlin, Germany	3rd	4 × 100 m relay	42.23
2019	European Indoor Championships	Glasgow, United Kingdom	8th (sf)	60 m	7.29
2019	World Relays	Yokohama, Japan	3rd	4 × 100 m relay	43.68
2019	Universiade	Naples, Italy	3rd	100 m	11.39
2019	Universiade	Naples, Italy	3rd	200 m	23.11
2019	World Championships	Doha, Qatar	13th (sf)	200 m	22.83
2019	World Championships	Doha, Qatar	5th	4 × 100 m relay	42.48
2021	Olympic Games	Tokyo, Japan	25th (sf)	200 m	23.42

== Personal bests ==
Outdoor

- 100 metres – 11.29 (+1.9 m/s, Clermont 2018)
- 200 metres – 22.77 (+0.9 m/s, Doha 2019)

Indoor

- 60 metres – 7.38 (Leipzig 2016)
- 200 metres – 23.62 (Leipzig 2017)
