= Zoe Hobbs =

New Zealand sprinter (born 1997)

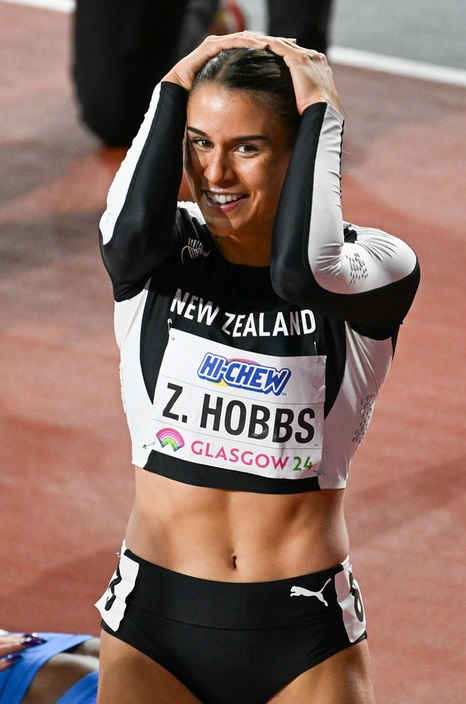
- Hobbs at the 2024 World Athletics Indoor Championships

Personal information
- Born: 11 September 1997 (age 29) Hāwera, New Zealand
- Height: 1.71 m (5 ft 7 in)

Sport
- Country: New Zealand
- Sport: Athletics
- Event: Sprinting

Achievements and titles
- National finals: 100 m champion (2017, 2018, 2019, 2020, 2021, 2022, 2023, 2024, 2025, 2026); 200 m champion (2017, 2019, 2020)
- Personal bests: 60 m: 7.06i (2024) AR; 100 m: 10.93 (2026) AR; 200 m: 23.19 (2019)
Medal record
Women's athletics
Representing New Zealand
Commonwealth Games
| Gold medal – first place | 2026 Glasgow | 100 m |
Oceania Area Championships
| Gold medal – first place | 2019 Townsville | 100m |
| Gold medal – first place | 2022 Mackay | 100m |
| Gold medal – first place | 2026 Darwin | 100m |
| Silver medal – second place | 2019 Townsville | 200m |
Summer Universiade
| Bronze medal – third place | 2019 Napoli | 4x100 m |

Zoe Hobbs (born 11 September 1997) is a New Zealand track and field sprinter competing in the 60 metres, 100 m and 200 m. She won the gold medal in the 100 metres at the 2026 Commonwealth Games, the first New Zealand athlete to win the event. She is the Oceanian record holder for both the 60 m and the 100 m, the latter achieved in winning the Commonwealth Games gold.

Hobbs was the first Oceanian woman to break the 11-second barrier in the 100 m. She has won 13 individual New Zealand national titles.

== Early life and background ==
Zoe Hobbs was born in Stratford, Taranaki, to Dorothy and Grant Hobbs. Hobbs is of Māori descent, affiliating with the Ngāruahine and Ngāti Ruanui iwi of South Taranaki. She attended Ngaere School, where she enjoyed racing boys barefoot at lunchtime, New Plymouth Girls' High School in New Plymouth, and Massey University in Auckland, graduating in 2021 with a Bachelor of Science degree, majoring in Human Nutrition.

She started athletics at Eltham Athletics Club at the age of five, though also played other sports growing up. In her final year of high school she started focussing primarily on athletics.

== Career ==
As a 15-year-old, Hobbs made the semi-finals of the 100 metres at the 2013 World Youth [Under-18] Championships held in Donetsk, Ukraine. She won the national secondary schools 100 m title three years in a row.

She set the current New Zealand U20 100 m record of 11.53 s on 20 July 2016 in the heats of the World U20 Championships in Bydgoszcz, Poland, progressing to the semi-finals.

Hobbs competed in Summer Universiades in Taipei in 2017 and Napoli in 2019, making the finals of both the 100 m and the 200 m at the latter, as well as winning a bronze medal (and setting a NZ record) as part of the NZ women's 4 × 100 m relay. In January 2019, she broke Michelle Seymour's 1994 New Zealand residents 100 m record with a time of 11.42 s. Later that year, she competed in the 100 m and 200 m at the World Athletics Championships in Doha, Qatar.

In 2021, Hobbs twice equalled Michelle Seymour's 28-year-old NZ 100 m record of 11.32 s, before lowering it on 18 December to 11.27 s.

In early 2022, she lowered her own NZ 100 m record twice more with 11.21 s and then 11.15 s (which also claimed the NZ all-comers record). At the 2022 World Athletics Indoor Championships held in mid-March in Belgrade, Serbia, Hobbs broke the Oceania 60 metres record with a time of 7.13 s, qualifying for the semi-finals, where she ran 7.16 s, 0.02 outside a finals berth. On 1 April she won the 100 m at the Australian Athletics Championships in a new championship record time of 11.17 s. On 4 June she was part of a 4 × 100 m relay team that set the current NZ 4 × 100 m record (breaking the record she had helped set in April).

Hobbs first broke the Oceania 100 m record on 7 June 2022 in winning the final at the Oceania Athletics Championships in Mackay, Australia, with a time of 11.09 s. On 16 July, she ran a faster 11.08 s to finish second in the first heat of the 100 m at the World Athletics Championships, Eugene, Oregon, thus making the semi-finals where she finished fifth (running 11.13). Hobbs made the final of the 100 m at the 2022 Commonwealth Games in Birmingham, England, initially finishing sixth but later upgraded to fifth after the original fifth placegetter was disqualified for a doping offence.

On 2 March 2023, Hobbs lowered the Oceania and NZ all-comers' 100 m records with a time of 11.07 s in the heats of the NZ National Championships in Wellington. In the final she ran 10.89 s with a 3.4 m/s tailwind. On 11 March, at the Sydney Track Classic, Hobbs officially broke the 11-second barrier with 10.97 s to set new Oceania and Australian all-comers' records. Five days later, at the Sir Graeme Douglas International meet in Auckland, she lowered her New Zealand all-comers' record to 11.02 s.

On 2 July 2023, Hobbs ran 10.96 s in the heats of the Resisprint International in La Chaux-de-Fonds, Switzerland, to again break the Oceania record. At the 2023 World Athletics Championships she was tenth fastest overall in the semi-finals of the 100 metres, missing the final by 0.01 s. After finishing fourth in the Memorial van Damme in Bruxelles, Belgium, on 8 September, Hobbs was sixth-equal on the 2023 Diamond League points table and qualified for the Diamond League Final held at the Prefontaine Classic in Eugene, Oregon, USA, on 16–17 September, where she placed ninth in 11.18 s.

On 2 March 2024, Hobbs finished fourth in the final of the women's 60 metres at the 2024 World Athletics Indoor Championships, in an Oceanian record of 7.06 s. At the 2024 Summer Olympics she progressed to the semi-finals of the 100 metres. On 26 September she competed in the inaugural Athlos professional, female-only, track and field meet at Icahn Stadium in New York City.

On 22 March 2025 Hobbs finished sixth in the final of the women's 60 metres at the 2025 World Athletics Indoor Championships. On 24 June 2025 she broke her own Oceania 100 m record with a time of 10.94 s at the Ostrava Golden Spike, a World Athletics Continental Tour Gold Meeting. Hobbs competed in four Diamond League meetings in 2025, finishing third in the Meeting International d’Athlétisme Herculis EBS in Monaco on 11 July and sixth in the 2025 Weltklasse Zürich Diamond League Final on 28 August.

Hobbs attained a then career high 100 m World Ranking of 12th in September 2025.

In 2026 Hobbs represented NZ in five competitions: the World Indoor Championships; the World Relay Championships; the Oceania Athletics Championships; the Commonwealth Games; and the World Ultimate (Athletics) Championships. On 28 July, she won the gold medal in the 100 metres at the Commonwealth Games in Glasgow, running a new Oceanian record of 10.93 seconds. Then, after returning to NZ for a fortnight or so, Hobbs returned to Europe to compete in the Diamond League, including in the Diamond League Final (6th), at GalAthletics Bellinzona, in the inaugural World Ultimate Championships, and in the Athlos Meet held in London (2nd).

Hobbs attained a mid-to-end northern season 100 m World Ranking of 10th in mid-August 2026 (she had attained a ranking of 9th two and a half months earler, at the end of May, before the northern international season was in full swing).

== Athletics achievements ==
Information from her World Athletics profile unless otherwise noted.

=== Personal bests ===
| Type | Distance | Time (s) | Wind (m/s) | Venue | Date | Notes |
Individual events
| Indoor | 60 metres | 7.06 | —N/a | Glasgow, United Kingdom | 2 March 2024 | AR |
| Outdoor | 60 metres | 7.17 | +1.2 | Canberra, Australia | 25 January 2025 | |
| Outdoor | 100 metres | 10.93 | +1.0 | Glasgow, United Kingdom | 28 July 2026 | AR |
| Outdoor | 200 metres | 23.19 | +1.8 | Canberra, Australia | 10 February 2019 | |
Team events
| Outdoor | 4 × 100 metres relay | 43.79 | —N/a | Mackay, Australia | 4 June 2022 | NR |
| Outdoor | 4 × 100 metres relay Mx | 41.24 | —N/a | Gaborone, Botswana | 3 May 2026 | |

Hobbs was timed at 10.11 s for 100 yards during her 100m run at the 2023 Sydney Track Classic (credited as the Australian All-Comers Record for the distance).

=== International competitions ===
Representing New Zealand
| Year | Competition | Venue | Position | Event | Time | Notes |
|---|---|---|---|---|---|---|
| 2013 | Australian Youth Olympic Festival | Sydney, Australia | 1st | 100 m | 12.42 | |
| 2013 | Australian Youth Olympic Festival | Sydney, Australia | 4th | 200 m | 25.41 | |
| 2013 | World Youth Championships | Donetsk, Ukraine | 14th (sf) | 100 m | 11.97 | |
| 2013 | World Youth Championships | Donetsk, Ukraine | 10th (h) | Sprint Medley 1000 m | 2:13.00 | SB |
| 2016 | World U20 Championships | Bydgoszcz, Poland | 13th (sf) | 100 m | 11.67 | |
| 2016 | World U20 Championships | Bydgoszcz, Poland | — | 4 × 100 m relay | DQ | TR17.2.3 |
| 2017 | Summer Universiade | Taipei, Taiwan | 14th (sf) | 100 m | 11.85 | |
| 2017 | Summer Universiade | Taipei, Taiwan | 18th (h) | 200 m | 24.33 | |
| 2019 | Oceania Championships | Townsville, Australia | 1st | 100 m | 11.56 | CR |
| 2019 | Oceania Championships | Townsville, Australia | 2nd | 200 m | 23.68 | |
| 2019 | Summer Universiade | Naples, Italy | 8th | 100 m | 11.55 | |
| 2019 | Summer Universiade | Naples, Italy | 7th | 200 m | 23.52 | |
| 2019 | Summer Universiade | Naples, Italy | 3rd | 4 × 100 m relay | 44.24 | NR |
| 2019 | World Championships | Doha, Qatar | 39th (h) | 100 m | 11.58 | |
| 2019 | World Championships | Doha, Qatar | 42nd (h) | 200 m | 23.94 | |
| 2022 | World Indoor Championships | Belgrade, Serbia | 11th (sf) | 60 m | 7.16 | |
| 2022 | Oceania Championships | Mackay, Australia | 1st | 100 m | 11.09 | CR AR |
| 2022 | World Championships | Eugene, United States | 14th (sf) | 100 m | 11.13 | 11.08 AR in heat |
| 2022 | Commonwealth Games | Birmingham, United Kingdom | 5th | 100 m | 11.19 | |
| 2023 | World Championships | Budapest, Hungary | 10th (sf) | 100 m | 11.02 | |
| 2024 | World Indoor Championships | Glasgow, United Kingdom | 4th | 60 m | 7.06 | AR |
| 2024 | Olympic Games | Paris, France | 14th (sf) | 100 m | 11.13 | |
| 2025 | World Indoor Championships | Nanjing, China | 6th | 60 m | 7.13 | |
| 2025 | World Championships | Tokyo, Japan | 17th (sf) | 100 m | 11.09 | |
| 2026 | World Indoor Championships | Toruń, Poland | 10th (sf) | 60 m | 7.12 | |
| 2026 | World Relays | Gaborone, Botswana | — | 4 × 100 m relay Mx | DNF | Re |
| 2026 | World Relays | Gaborone, Botswana | 8th | 4 × 100 m relay Mx | 41.24 | SB |
| 2026 | Oceania Championships | Darwin, Australia | 1st | 100 m | 11.00 | CR |
| 2026 | Commonwealth Games | Glasgow, United Kingdom | 1st | 100 m | 10.93 | AR |
| 2026 | World Ultimate Championship | Budapest, Hungary | 16th (sf) | 100 m | 11.27 | |

=== National titles ===
She has won thirteen national titles at individual senior level.

- New Zealand Athletics Championships
  - 100 metres: 2017, 2018, 2019, 2020, 2021, 2022, 2023, 2024, 2025, 2026 (10)
  - 200 metres: 2017, 2019, 2020 (3)

== Awards ==
- Taranaki Senior Sportswoman of the Year 2022, 2023 and 2026;
- Taranaki Overall Sportsperson of the Year 2023 and 2026.
- Māori Senior Sports Woman of the Year 2026
- Māori Sports Person of the Year 2026

== Personal life ==
In October 2025, Hobbs announced her engagement to New Zealand sailor Stewart Dodson.
