= Riley Day =

Australian sprinter

Personal information
- Nationality: Australian
- Born: 30 March 2000 (age 25) Beaudesert, Queensland, Australia
- Education: Griffith University
- Height: 1.70 m (5 ft 7 in)
- Weight: 60 kg (132 lb)

Sport
- Sport: Sprinting
- Event(s): 100 metres, 200 metres
- Club: Beaudesert

Riley Day (born 30 March 2000) is an Australian sprinter. She was selected for the 2020 Summer Olympics in Tokyo and competed in the Women's 200 meters. Day came third in her heat and therefore qualified for the semi-final. She managed a time of 22:56, 0.43 of a second behind the winner Shelly-Ann Frazer-Pryce from Jamaica.

== Early years ==
Riley began her athletics career at the age of nine, when she was entered into her local Little Athletics club in her hometown of Beaudesert, Queensland by her mother. In 2014 at the age of 14, Day ran her first sub-12 100m time. Two years later, in 2016, she ran 23.51 (200m) in the Queensland schools championships and also ran a wind-assisted 11.39 in the 100 meters. Two months later she ran 11.36 (100m) and 23.52 (200m), winning the National schools title.

== Achievements ==
Riley entered the public eye through her performances at the 2017 Nitro Athletics series. She then competed at the 2017 Commonwealth Youth Games in Nassau, Bahamas, winning gold in the 200 metres and silver in the 100 metres. From her performances she was invited to compete in the 200 metres at the 2017 World Championships in Athletics in London.

Riley competed in the women's 200 metres at the 2017 World Championships in Athletics. She placed seventh in her heat with a time of 23.77s.

She competed in the 200 metres at the 2018 Commonwealth Games on the Gold Coast, Australia, after winning the Australian Athletics Titles in both the 100 meters and the 200 meters. At the Commonwealth Games, she made the semi-finals and ran fourth in her race, in a time of 23.24s. She missed out on a position in the final by 0.01s to Bianca Williams.

Riley's other notable achievements include winning the silver medal at the 2019 World University Games in Naples, Italy, in the 200 meters as well as being a 2 x Oceania Champion, and a 3 x National Champion.
