= 2019 Summer Universiade =

Multi-sport event in Naples, Italy

XXX Summer Universiade
- Logo of the 2019 Summer Universiade
- Host city: Naples, Italy
- Motto: To Be Unique (Italian: Essere unici)
- Nations: 111
- Athletes: 5,893
- Sport: 18
- Events: 220
- Opening: 3 July
- Closing: 14 July
- Opened by: President Sergio Mattarella
- Athlete's Oath: Luca Zini
- Judge's Oath: Silvia Store
- Torch lighter: Carlotta Ferlito & Lorenzo Insigne
- Main venue: Stadio San Paolo
- Website: universiade2019napoli.it (archived)

Summer

Winter

The 2019 Summer Universiade (Italian: 2019 Universiade estiva), officially known as the XXX Summer Universiade (Italian: XXX Universiade estiva) and also known as Naples 2019, or Napoli 2019, was held in Naples, Italy, between 3 and 14 July 2019.

It was initially scheduled for Brasília, Brazil in July 2019. However, on 23 December 2014, it was confirmed that Brasília had withdrawn from hosting the event, citing financial problems. International University Sports Federation decided to reopen the bidding process after the withdrawal.

== Host selection ==
=== First process ===
On 14 June 2012, the then-Brazilian Minister of Sports, Aldo Rebelo, and the president of CBDU (Confederação Brasileira do Desporto Universitário), Luciano Cabral, announced that after the failed bid by Brazil for the 2017 Summer Universiade, they would bid again for the 2019 Summer Universiade. Brazil's capital Brasília was appointed as the bid city again after it lost in 2017 to Taipei. Brazil previously hosted the Summer Universiade once in 1963 in Porto Alegre.

On 11 December 2012, Azad Rahimov, the Youth and Sports Minister of Azerbaijan, announced that after the country won the rights to host the first European Games in 2015, they would bid to host the 2019 Summer Universiade. The attempt was the first time that Azerbaijan placed a bid for the Universiade. Baku would represent the country as the bid city.

On 31 January 2013, Miklós Tóth, the vice-chairman of the Hungarian Olympic Committee, announced that Hungary would make a bid for the 2019 or 2021 Summer Universiade with the aid of Alfréd Hajós' Plan (Hajós Alfréd Terv). Budapest previously hosted the 1965 Summer Universiade and was confirmed as the bid city on 19 February 2013.

On 3 April 2013, FISU officially confirmed three candidate cities:

- Baku, Azerbaijan
- Brasília, Brazil
- Budapest, Hungary

On 31 October 2013, Baku officially withdrew from the bidding process for the 2019 Summer Universiade, citing that the city will be busy with other sporting events in the period of 2015–2017 with the 2015 European Games and the 2017 Islamic Solidarity Games. On 8 November 2013, Budapest withdrew because the city could not afford the costs of the event, leaving Brasília as the only bidding city. On 9 November 2013, FISU nominated Brasilia as host city of the 2019 Summer Universiade. On 5 March 2016, FISU reattributed the 2019 Universiade to Naples, Italy.

== Venues ==
The Organising committee plans to involve already existed sports facilities after their renovation.

Naples venues

- Stadio San Paolo – ceremonies and athletics
- PalaVesuvio – Artistic gymnastics and Rhythmic gymnastics
- PalaBarbuto – Basketball
- Mostra d'Oltremare – Diving, Judo and Shooting sports
- Ex Born – Rugby sevens
- Circolo del Remo and Vela Italia – Sailing
- Felice Scandone pool – Swimming
- Tennis and Caracciolo boardwalk – Tennis

Avellino venues

- Stadio Partenio-Adriano Lombardi – Archery
- Palasport Del Mauro – Basketball

Baronissi venues

- University Sports Center CUS Salerno – Fencing

Caserta venues

- Royal Palace of Caserta – Archery
- Stadio Alberto Pinto – Football
- Swimming Stadium – Swimming

Eboli venues

- PalaSele – Volleyball

== Opening ceremony ==
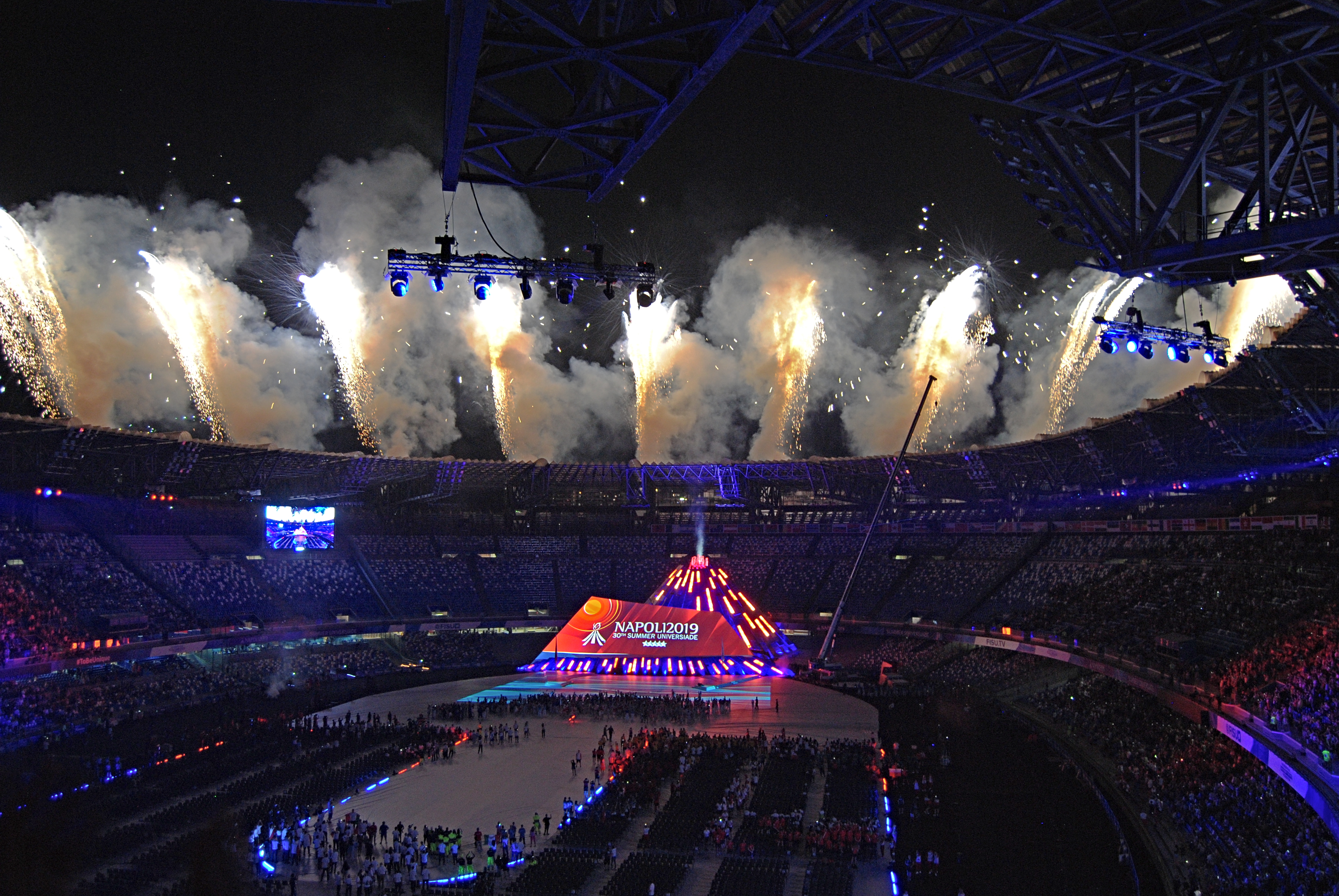
The opening ceremony.

The opening ceremony was held at Stadio San Paolo and ran from 21:00 to 00:20 Central European Summer Time including a special performance by Italian tenor Andrea Bocelli.

== Marketing ==
=== Logo ===
The logo of the games was an image of Mount Vesuvius, a somma-stratovolcano located on the Gulf of Naples which was remodeled into five chromatic trails of both the Olympics and Universiade that resembles a race track. The lines meeting at the top and ending with a puff of multicoloured smoke symbolise different people’s involvement with a unique objective of sharing and contributing to development, progress, solidarity, and coexistence.

=== Mascot ===
The mascot of the games was a Siren named "Partenope", which was designed by Melania Acanfora, young Neapolitan student of the “Accademia delle Belle Arti” (Academy of Fine Arts). The Mascot is described as a gymnast with her fish tail that could be transformed into scaly legs which allow her to run, jump, dance, just as a real athlete. In the opening ceremony, Mariafelicia Carraturo interpreted the mascot.

== Sports ==
- Aquatics
  - Diving (15)
  - Swimming (40)
  - Water polo (2)
- Archery (10)
- Athletics (50)
- Basketball (2)
- Fencing (12)
- Football (2)
- Gymnastics
  - Artistic gymnastics (14)
  - Rhythmic gymnastics (8)
- Judo (14)
- Rugby sevens (2)
- Sailing (1)
- Shooting (13)
- Table tennis (7)
- Taekwondo (19)
- Tennis (7)
- Volleyball (2)

== Participants ==
in order of appearance, Parade of Nations:

Participating National University Sports Federations
- Albania
- Algeria
- Argentina
- Armenia
- Australia
- Austria
- Azerbaijan
- Bangladesh
- Belarus
- Belgium (41)
- Bermuda
- Botswana
- Brazil
- Bulgaria
- Burkina Faso
- Burundi
- Cameroon
- Canada (274)
- Cape Verde
- Central African Republic
- Chile
- China
- Comoros
- Democratic Republic of the Congo
- Costa Rica
- Croatia
- Cyprus
- Czech Republic
- Denmark
- Egypt
- Estonia (51)
- Eswatini
- Ethiopia
- Finland
- France
- The Gambia
- Georgia
- Germany
- Ghana
- Guinea
- Honduras (2)
- Hong Kong
- Hungary
- India
- Indonesia (51)
- Iran
- Ireland
- Israel
- Ivory Coast
- Japan
- Jordan
- Kazakhstan
- Kenya
- South Korea (207)
- Kosovo (1)
- Kuwait
- Kyrgyzstan
- Lebanon
- Libya
- Liechtenstein
- Latvia
- Lithuania
- Luxembourg
- Macau
- Madagascar
- Malawi
- Malaysia (35)
- Moldova
- Mexico
- Monaco (1)
- Mongolia
- Montenegro
- Morocco
- Mozambique
- Nepal
- New Zealand
- Netherlands
- North Macedonia
- Nigeria
- North Korea
- Norway
- Oman
- Paraguay
- Philippines
- Palestine
- Poland (117)
- Portugal
- Romania
- Russia (275)
- Saudi Arabia
- Senegal
- Sierra Leone
- San Marino
- Singapore
- Slovakia
- Slovenia
- Somalia
- South Africa
- Spain
- Serbia
- Sri Lanka
- Sweden
- Switzerland
- Chinese Taipei (131)
- Thailand
- Trinidad and Tobago
- Turkey
- Turkmenistan (19)
- Uganda
- Ukraine
- United Arab Emirates
- Great Britain
- United States (371)
- Uruguay
- Uzbekistan
- Vietnam (0)
- Virgin Islands
- Zambia
- Zimbabwe
- Italy (301) (host)

== Schedule ==
OC	Opening ceremony	●	Event competitions	1	Event finals	CC	Closing ceremony

July	2 Tue	3 Wed	4 Thu	5 Fri	6 Sat	7 Sun	8 Mon	9 Tue	10 Wed	11 Thu	12 Fri	13 Sat	14 Sun	Events
Ceremonies		OC											CC	
Aquatics - Diving	●	●	4	2	3	2	4							15
Aquatics - Swimming			4	5	5	7	4	7	8					40
Aquatics - Water polo	●	●	●	●	●	●	●	●	●	●	●	1	1	2
Archery								●	●	●	5	5		10
Athletics							2	6	9	8	11	14		50
Basketball		●	●	●	●	●	●	●	1	1				2
Fencing			2	2	2	2	2	2						12
Football	●		●	●	●	●	●	●	●	●	1	1		2
Gymnastics		●	1	1	2	10				●	2	6		22
Judo			4	4	4	2								14
Rugby sevens				●	●	2								2
Sailing							●	●	●	●	1			1
Shooting			2	3	3	1	1	3						13
Table tennis			●	●	●	2	●	1	2	2				7
Taekwondo						2	3	3	3	3	3	2		19
Tennis				●	●	●	●	●	●	●	2	5		7
Volleyball				●	●	●	●	●	●	●	1	1		2
Daily medal events	0	0	17	17	19	30	16	22	23	14	26	35	1	220
Cumulative total	0	0	17	34	53	83	99	121	144	158	184	219	220	
July	2 Tue	3 Wed	4 Thu	5 Fri	6 Sat	7 Sun	8 Mon	9 Tue	10 Wed	11 Thu	12 Fri	13 Sat	14 Sun	Events

== Closing ceremony ==
The closing ceremony was held on 14 July 2019 at the Stadio San Paolo and ran from 21:00 to 23:20 Central European Summer Time. The closing ceremony featuring the handover of the FISU flag to the Chinese city of Chengdu as the host city of the 2021 Summer Universiade. Along with the FISU, protocol the ceremony had the performances by rapper Clementino, singer and Eurovision Song Contest 2019 runner-up Mahmood and Austrian DJ Sonic Snares.

== Medal table ==
* Host nation (Italy)

Rank	Nation	Gold	Silver	Bronze	Total
1	Japan (JPN)	33	21	28	82
2	Russia (RUS)	22	24	36	82
3	China (CHN)	22	13	8	43
4	United States (USA)	21	17	15	53
5	South Korea (KOR)	17	17	16	50
6	Italy (ITA)*	15	13	16	44
7	Chinese Taipei (TPE)	9	13	10	32
8	Mexico (MEX)	8	7	6	21
9	Iran (IRI)	7	3	7	17
10	South Africa (RSA)	6	8	4	18
11	Ukraine (UKR)	6	7	7	20
12	Australia (AUS)	6	5	6	17
13	Brazil (BRA)	5	3	9	17
14	Turkey (TUR)	4	5	5	14
15	Poland (POL)	4	2	9	15
16	France (FRA)	3	9	11	23
17	Great Britain (GBR)	3	3	4	10
18	Azerbaijan (AZE)	2	3	2	7
19	Uzbekistan (UZB)	2	2	4	8
20	Czech Republic (CZE)	2	2	3	7
21	Finland (FIN)	2	2	1	5
22	Switzerland (SUI)	2	1	1	4
23	Moldova (MDA)	2	0	2	4
24	Germany (GER)	1	9	8	18
25	Kazakhstan (KAZ)	1	5	1	7
26	Belarus (BLR)	1	3	1	5
27	Austria (AUT)	1	2	0	3
28	Canada (CAN)	1	1	4	6
29	India (IND)	1	1	2	4
29	Lithuania (LTU)	1	1	2	4
29	Slovakia (SVK)	1	1	2	4
32	Morocco (MAR)	1	1	1	3
33	Thailand (THA)	1	0	4	5
34	Hungary (HUN)	1	0	2	3
35	Armenia (ARM)	1	0	1	2
35	Cyprus (CYP)	1	0	1	2
35	Estonia (EST)	1	0	1	2
35	New Zealand (NZL)	1	0	1	2
35	North Korea (PRK)	1	0	1	2
40	Algeria (ALG)	1	0	0	1
40	Bulgaria (BUL)	1	0	0	1
40	Philippines (PHI)	1	0	0	1
40	Sweden (SWE)	1	0	0	1
44	Portugal (POR)	0	2	2	4
45	Egypt (EGY)	0	2	0	2
46	Romania (ROM)	0	1	3	4
47	Belgium (BEL)	0	1	2	3
47	Netherlands (NED)	0	1	2	3
49	Georgia (GEO)	0	1	1	2
49	Mongolia (MGL)	0	1	1	2
49	Norway (NOR)	0	1	1	2
49	Uganda (UGA)	0	1	1	2
53	Argentina (ARG)	0	1	0	1
53	Burkina Faso (BUR)	0	1	0	1
53	Trinidad and Tobago (TTO)	0	1	0	1
56	Hong Kong (HKG)	0	0	2	2
57	Chile (CHI)	0	0	1	1
57	Croatia (CRO)	0	0	1	1
57	Denmark (DEN)	0	0	1	1
57	Ethiopia (ETH)	0	0	1	1
57	Indonesia (INA)	0	0	1	1
57	Ireland (IRL)	0	0	1	1
57	Israel (ISR)	0	0	1	1
57	Latvia (LAT)	0	0	1	1
57	Malaysia (MAS)	0	0	1	1
57	Singapore (SGP)	0	0	1	1
57	Slovenia (SLO)	0	0	1	1
57	Spain (ESP)	0	0	1	1
Totals (68 entries)		223	218	269	710
