= 2013–14 Australian Athletics Championships =

- Dates: 3–6 April 2014
- Host city: Melbourne, Australia
- Venue: Lakeside Stadium
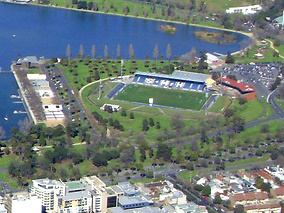

The 2013–14 Australian Athletics Championships was the 92nd edition of the national championship in outdoor track and field for Australia. It was held from 3–6 April 2014 at Lakeside Stadium in Melbourne. It served as a selection meeting for Australia at the 2014 Commonwealth Games. The 10,000 metres event took place separately at the Zatopek 10K on 12 December 2013 at the same venue.

== Medal summary ==
=== Men ===
Event	Gold		Silver		Bronze	
100 metres (Wind: -1.2)	Tim Leathart; New South Wales	10.56	Banuve Tabakaucoro; Fiji (FIJ)	10.57	Joseph Millar; New Zealand (NZL)	10.61
200 metres (Wind: -0.2)	Mangar Makur Chuot; Western Australia	21.08	Joseph Millar; New Zealand (NZL)	21.25	Kevin Moore; New South Wales	21.34
400 metres	Steven Solomon; New South Wales	45.36	Craig Burns; Queensland	46.23	Alex Beck; Queensland	46.33
800 metres	Josh Ralph; New South Wales	1:46.57	Alexander Rowe; Victoria	1:46.68	Jeff Riseley; Victoria	1:47.11
1500 metres	Jeff Riseley; Victoria	3:46.47	Ryan Gregson; New South Wales	3:48.01	Brenton Rowe; Victoria	3:49.27
5000 metres	Collis Birmingham; Victoria	13:44.55	Ben St Lawrence; New South Wales	13:48.83	Brenton Rowe; Victoria	13:55.56
10,000 metres	Sam Chelanga; United States (USA)	27:46.06	Collis Birmingham; Victoria	27:56.22	Harry Summers; New South Wales	28:16.05
110 metres hurdles (Wind: -2.9)	Nicholas Hough; New South Wales	14.12	Jack Conway; Queensland	14.40	Joshua Hawkins; New Zealand (NZL)	14.42 14.412
400 metres hurdles	Ian Dewhurst; New South Wales	49.52	Tristan Thomas; Tasmania	50.13	Daniel O'Shea; New Zealand (NZL)	50.74
3000 metres steeplechase	James Nipperess; New South Wales	8:38.87	Youcef Abdi; New South Wales	8:53.43	Craig Appleby; Victoria	8:54.14
10,000 metres	Dane Bird-Smith; Queensland	38:57.16	Chris Erickson; Victoria	40:51.82	Rhydian Cowley; Victoria	41:17.67
High jump	Nik Bojic; Queensland	2.23 m	Brandon Starc; New South Wales	2.20 m	Hiromi Takahari; Japan (JPN)	2.16 m
Pole vault	Joel Pocklington; Victoria	5.25 m (jump-off)	Matthew Boyd; Queensland	5.15 m	Brodie Cross; Victoria	5.15 m
Long jump	Robert Crowther; Queensland	8.03 m (+1.7 m/s)	Fabrice Lapierre; New South Wales	7.87 m (+2.6 m/s)	Thomas Soliman; Queensland	7.59 m (+1.4 m/s)
Triple jump	Phillips Idowu; Great Britain (GBR)	16.71 m (+2.4 m/s)	Alwyn Jones; Victoria	16.37 m (+3.2 m/s)	Daigo Hasegawa; Japan (JPN)	16.23 m (+3.8 m/s)
Shot put	Damien Birkinhead; Victoria	19.04 m	Dale Stevenson; Victoria	17.93 m	Chris Gaviglio; Queensland	17.30 m
Discus throw	Benn Harradine; Queensland	62.23 m	Shane Loveridge; New South Wales	55.26 m	Marshall Hall; New Zealand (NZL)	54.32 m
Hammer throw	Tim Driesen; Victoria	67.16 m	Matthew Denny; Queensland	65.13 m	Huw Peacock; Tasmania	63.08 m
Javelin throw	Josh Robinson; Queensland	82.48 m	Hamish Peacock; Tasmania	80.51 m	Luke Cann; Victoria	78.19 m
Decathlon	Jake Stein; New South Wales	7564 pts	Stephen Cain; Victoria	7493 pts	Kyle Cranston; New South Wales	7390 pts

=== Women ===
Event	Gold		Silver		Bronze	
100 metres (Wind: -4.1)	Sally Pearson; Queensland	11.70	Melissa Breen; Australian Capital Territory	11.90	Ashleigh Whittaker; Victoria	11.95
200 metres (Wind: +0.5)	Ella Nelson; New South Wales	23.47	Ashleigh Whittaker; Victoria	23.55	Anneliese Rubie; New South Wales	23.88
400 metres	Morgan Mitchell; Victoria	52.22	Anneliese Rubie; New South Wales	52.35	Caitlin Sargent; Queensland	52.77
800 metres	Brittany McGowan; Queensland	2:02.15	Selma Kajan; New South Wales	2:02.59	Georgia Wassall; New South Wales	2:02.82
1500 metres	Zoe Buckman; Victoria	4:10.86	Heidi Gregson; New South Wales	4:11.66	Jenny Blundell; New South Wales	4:12.00
5000 metres	Emily Brichacek; Australian Capital Territory	15:52.65	Eloise Wellings; New South Wales	15:53.62	Kate Spencer; New South Wales	16:01.06
10,000 metres	Nikki Chapple; Victoria	32:56.22	Jessica Trengove; South Australia	33:08.26	Milly Clark; New South Wales	33:27.80
100 metres hurdles (Wind: +0.1)	Sally Pearson; Queensland	12.72	Shannon Mccann; Western Australia	13.21	Michelle Jenneke; New South Wales	13.34
400 metres hurdles	Lauren Wells; Australian Capital Territory	56.76	Lyndsay Pekin; Western Australia	57.11	Jess Gulli; Victoria	57.60
3000 metres steeplechase	Victoria Mitchell; Victoria	9:42.01	Madeline Heiner; New South Wales	9:48.25	Genevieve Lacaze; Queensland	10:15.55
10,000 metres	Tanya Holliday; South Australia	45:08.42	Nicole Fagan; New South Wales	45:21.47	Kelly Ruddick; Victoria	45:25.90
High jump	Eleanor Patterson; Victoria	1.92 m	Sarah Cowley; New Zealand (NZL)	1.89 m	Zoe Timmers; Western Australia	1.86 m
Pole vault	Liz Parnov; Western Australia	4.20 m	Emma Philippe; Western Australia	4.20 m	Jamie Scroop; South Australia	4.10 m
Long jump	Brooke Stratton; Victoria	6.70 m (+1.4 m/s)	Jessica Penney; Australian Capital Territory	6.45 m (+1.0 m/s)	Chelsea Jaensch; Queensland	6.37 m (+0.6 m/s)
Triple jump	Linda Leverton; Queensland	13.93 m (+0.7 m/s)	Ellen Pettitt; Victoria	13.43 m (+1.8 m/s)	Emma Knight; Victoria	13.13 m (+1.6 m/s)
Shot put	Te Rina Keenan; New Zealand (NZL)	15.59 m	Kim Mulhall; Victoria	15.00 m	Alifatou Djibril; South Australia	14.93 m
Discus throw	Dani Samuels; New South Wales	66.81 m	Siositina Hakeai; New Zealand (NZL)	55.77 m	Taryn Gollshewsky; Queensland	53.66 m
Hammer throw	Lara Nielsen; Queensland	63.11 m	Gabrielle Neighbour; Victoria	62.47 m	Alexandra Hulley; New South Wales	59.43 m
Javelin throw	Kim Mickle; Western Australia	64.28 m	Kelsey-Lee Roberts; Australian Capital Territory	58.58 m	Risa Miyashita; Japan (JPN)	54.95 m
Heptathlon	Sophie Stanwell; New South Wales	5621 pts	Portia Bing; New Zealand (NZL)	5504 pts	Ashleigh Hamilton; Victoria	5347 pts
