= 2015–16 Australian Athletics Championships =

2016 Australian Athletics Championships
- Dates: 31 March–3 April 2016
- Host city: Sydney, Australia
- Venue: Sydney Olympic Park Athletic Centre
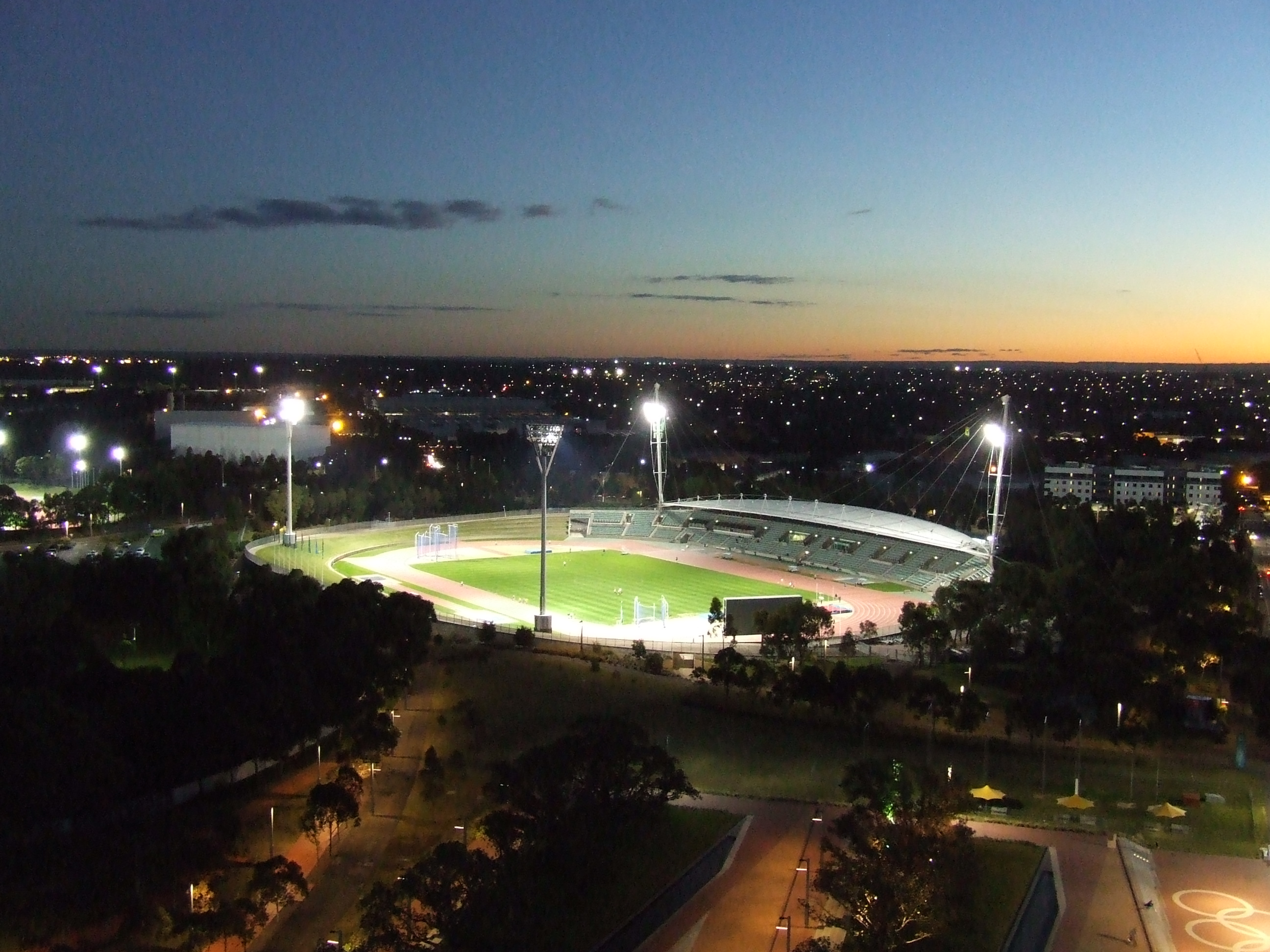

The 2016 Australian Athletics Championships was the 94th edition of the national championship in outdoor track and field for Australia. It was held from 31 March to 3 April at the Sydney Olympic Park Athletic Centre in Sydney. It served as the selection meeting for Australia at the 2016 Summer Olympics.

The combined track and field events formed part of the 2016 IAAF Combined Events Challenge series.

== Results ==
=== Men ===
Event	Gold		Silver		Bronze	
100 metres	Alex Hartmann	10.35	Jack Hale	10.40	Aaron Stubbs	10.41
200 metres	Alex Hartmann	20.43	Ryan Bedford	21.03	Will Johns	21.16
400 metres	Steven Solomon	45.50	Luke Stevens	46.05 PB	Alexander Beck	46.26
800 metres	Luke Mathews	1:46.20	Alex Rowe	1:47.31	Mason Cohen	1:47.41 PB
1500 metres	Ryan Gregson	3:37.76	Jordan Gusman	3:39.14 PB	Ryan Pyke	3:40.65
5000 metres	Sam McEntee	13:37.95	Brett Robinson	13:38.43	Ben St Lawrence	13:38.61
110 m hurdles	Justin Merlino	13.81	Jack Conway	14.15	Ben Khongbut	14.40
400 m hurdles	Leigh Bennett	50.67	Tristan Thomas	51.89	Raymond Smith	53.29
3000 m s'chase	James Nipperess	8:42.41	Stewart McSweyn	8:49.24 PB	Jack Colreavy	8:51.89 PB
10,000 m walk	Dane Bird-Smith	38:44.61 PB	Tyler Jones	43:39.86	Jay Felton	44:30.04 PB
High jump	Tom Brennan	2.17 m	Joel Baden	2.17 m	Nik Bojic	2.13 m
Pole vault	Kurtis Marschall	5.55 m PB	Max Mishchenko	5.23 m PB	Angus Armstrong	5.23 m
Long jump	Fabrice Lapierre	8.27 m	Henry Frayne	8.16 m	Tom Soliman	7.81 m w
Triple jump	Alwyn Jones	16.38 m	Tetteh Anang	16.33 m PB	Sean Barnes	15.71 m PB
Shot put	Matt Cowie	16.98 m	Todd Hodgetts	15.92 m	Shane Carstairs	15.40 m
Discus throw	Matthew Denny	60.47 m	Julian Wruck	58.74 m	Michael Vassilopoulos	51.36 m
Hammer throw	Matthew Denny	68.44 m	Huw Peacock	66.64 m	Ned Weatherly	64.34 m PB
Javelin throw	Hamish Peacock	82.84 m	Joshua Robinson	81.08 m	Luke Cann	78.04 m
Decathlon	Cedric Dubler	8144 pts PB	Jake Stein	7643 pts PB	David Brock	7517 pts

=== Women ===
Event	Gold		Silver		Bronze	
100 metres	Melissa Breen	11.53	Christine Wearne	11.71	Ashleigh Whittaker	11.77
200 metres	Ella Nelson	22.59	Jessica Thornton	23.27	Monica Brennan	23.57
400 metres	Morgan Mitchell	51.84	Jessica Thornton	52.33 PB	Anneliese Rubie	52.90
800 metres	Brittany McGowan	2:04.13	Selma Kajan	2:04.65	Tamsyn Manou	2:04.84
1500 metres	Heidi See	4:14.17	Linden Hall	4:14.41	Jenny Blundell	4:15.12
5000 metres	Genevieve LaCaze	15:43.83	Milly Clark	15:47.65 PB	Victoria Mitchell	15:58.35
100 m hurdles	Michelle Jenneke	12.93	Brianna Beahan	13.03 PB	Daniela Roman	13.29 PB
400 m hurdles	Lauren Wells	56.89	Sara Klein	57.99 PB	Lyndsay Pekin	58.13
3000 m s'chase	Madeline Hills	9:38.63	Genevieve LaCaze	9:49.41	Victoria Mitchell	9:52.99
10,000 m walk	Bekki Smith	43:08.48 PB	Tanya Holliday	44:33.87 PB	Clara Smith	47:17.64 PB
High jump	Eleanor Patterson	1.90 m	Zoe Timmers	1.87 m PB=	Hannah Joye	1.83 m
Pole vault	Liv Parnov	4.30 m	Nina Kennedy	4.20 m	Vicky Parnov	4.10 m
Long jump	Brooke Stratton	6.68 m	Jessica Penney	6.60 m PB=	Chelsea Jaensch	6.40 m
Triple jump	Meggan O'Riley	13.42 m PB	Ellen Pettitt	13.23 m	Tay-Leiha Clark	13.17 m w
Shot put	Chelsea Lenarduzzi	15.41 m PB	Christie Baker	14.54 m	Brianna Bortolanza	13.87 m PB
Discus throw	Dani Samuels	63.44 m	Taryn Gollshewsky	58.71 m	Kimberley Mulhall	52.82 m
Hammer throw	Lara Nielsen	65.33 m	Alexandra Hulley	63.19 m	Kaysanne Hockey	58.96 m
Javelin throw	Tianah List	51.56 m PB	Monique Cilione	50.53 m	Karen Clarke	46.12 m
Heptathlon	Sophie Stanwell	5572 pts	Kiara Reddingius	5490 pts PB	Casidhe Simmons	5428 pts
