= 2016–17 Australian Athletics Championships =

- Dates: 30 March – 2 April 2017
- Host city: Sydney, Australia
- Venue: Sydney Olympic Park Athletic Centre
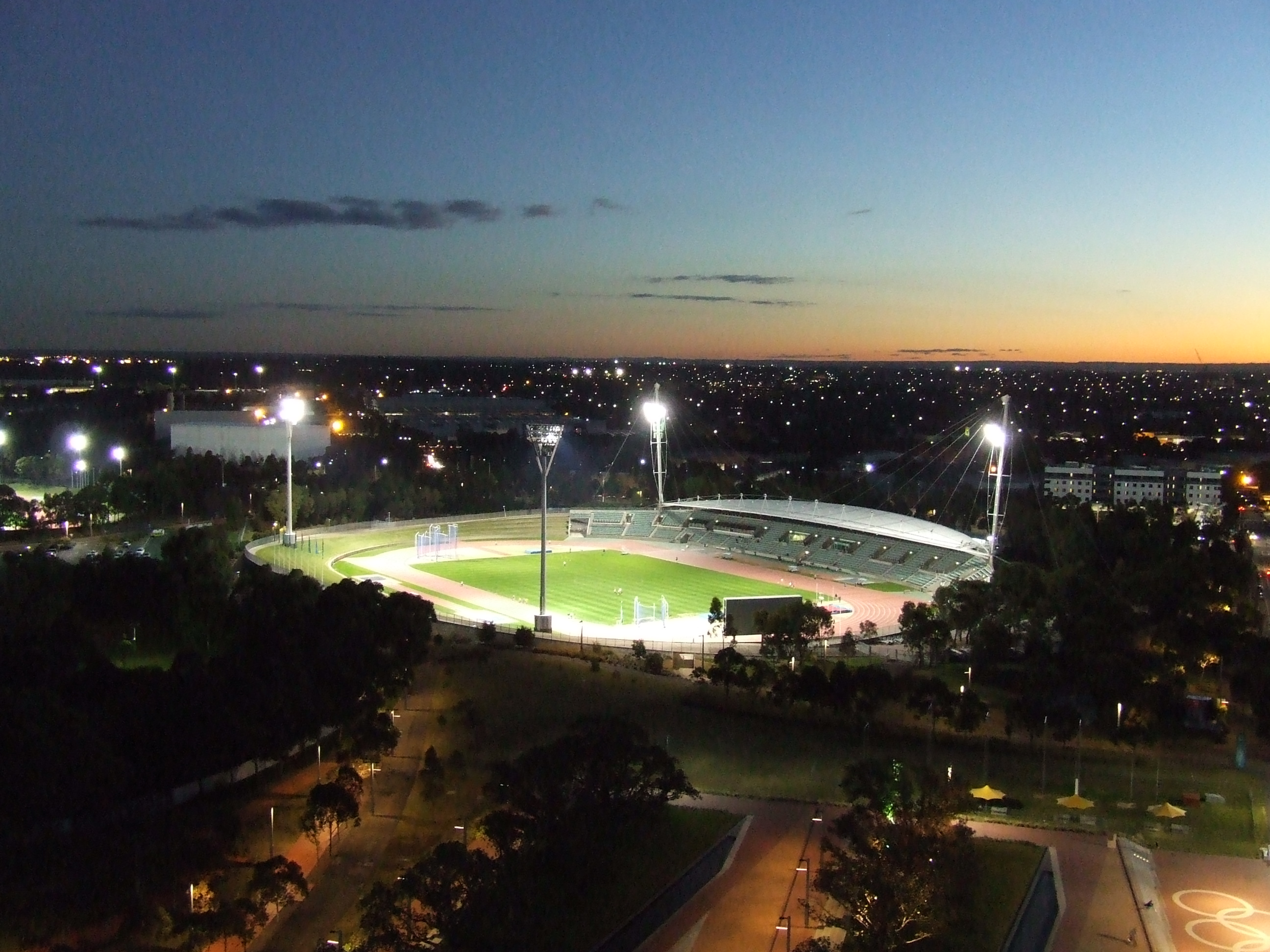

The 2016–17 Australian Athletics Championships was the 95th edition of the national championship in outdoor track and field for Australia. It was held from 30 March – 2 April 2017 at the Sydney Olympic Park Athletic Centre in Sydney. It served as the selection meeting for Australia at the 2017 World Championships in Athletics. Distance events were held separately, with the 10,000 metres taking place at the Zatopek 10K on 8 December 2016 at Lakeside Stadium in Melbourne and the 5000 metres taking place at the Summer of Athletics Meet in Canberra on 11 March 2017.

== Medal summary ==
=== Men ===
Event	Gold		Silver		Bronze	
100 metres (Wind: +0.1)	Joseph Millar; New Zealand (NZL)	10.25	Trae Williams; Queensland	10.29	Aaron Bresland; Western Australia	10.46
200 metres (Wind: -3.1)	Joseph Millar; New Zealand (NZL)	21.09	Alex Hartmann; Queensland	21.19	Craig Burns; Queensland	21.61
400 metres	Steven Solomon; New South Wales	46.66	Jackson Collett; New South Wales	46.77	Alex Beck; Queensland	46.83
800 metres	Luke Mathews; Victoria	1:46.71	Josh Ralph; New South Wales	1:46.76	Alexander Rowe; Victoria	1:47.29
1500 metres	Ryan Gregson; Victoria	3:52.86	Matthew Ramsden; Western Australia	3:53.12	Will Austin-Cray; New South Wales	3:53.68
1500 metres	David McNeill; Victoria	13:47.18	Jordan Gusman; Australian Capital Territory	13:48.56	Stewart McSweyn; Tasmania	13:49.04
10,000 metres	Patrick Tiernan; Queensland	27:59.74	Stewart McSweyn; Tasmania	28:29.65	Chris Hamer; Victoria	29:02.00
110 metres hurdles (Wind: +3.5)	Nicholas Hough; New South Wales	13.53	Justin Merlino; New South Wales	13.66	Wataru Yazawa; Japan (JPN)	13.76
400 metres hurdles	Ian Dewhurst; New South Wales	49.77	Keisuke Nozawa; Japan (JPN)	50.25	Leigh Bennett; New South Wales	51.21
3000 metres steeplechase	Hashim Salah; Qatar (QAT)	8:51.79	James Nipperess; New South Wales	8:52.89	Nathan Percy; Victoria	8:56.42
4 × 100 m relay	Victoria (VIC); Michael James; Michael Hansford; Nathan Riali; Christopher Mitrevski	40.56	New South Wales (NSW); Jordan Shelley; Nicholas Andrews; Zach Holdsworth; Will Roberts	40.82	Western Australia (WA); Terrell McKenzie; Aaron Bresland; Jeremy Andrews; Calvin Borowski	40.95
4 × 400 m relay	Queensland (QLD); Murray Goodwin; Daniel Mowen; Taylor Burns; Tjimarri Sanderson-Milera	3:12.16	New South Wales (NSW); Tyler Gunn; Josh Ralph; Zach Holdsworth; Jackson Collett	3:12.81	Victoria (VIC); Conrad Coumaros; Harrison Roubin; Matthew Napier; Liam Procaccino	3:15.98
High jump	Lee Hup Wei; Malaysia (MAS)	2.24 m	Nauraj Singh Randhawa; Malaysia (MAS)	2.21 m	Joel Baden; Victoria	2.18 m
Pole vault	Kurtis Marschall; South Australia	5.45 m	Nick Southgate; New Zealand (NZL)	5.30 m	Angus Armstrong; New South Wales	5.30 m
Long jump	Christopher Mitrevski; Victoria	7.90 m (+2.6 m/s)	Liam Adcock; Queensland	7.84 m (+3.7 m/s)	Shemaiah James; Queensland	7.83 m (+1.1 m/s)
Triple jump	Ryoma Yamamoto; Japan (JPN)	16.61 m (+0.5 m/s)	Alwyn Jones; Victoria	16.13 m (+0.7 m/s)	Benjamin Cox; New South Wales	15.95 m (+0.2 m/s)
Shot put	Damien Birkinhead; Victoria	19.80 m	Aiden Harvey; New South Wales	17.16 m	Matthew Cowie; Western Australia	17.11 m
Discus throw	Julian Wruck; Queensland	61.56 m	Matthew Denny; Queensland	61.28 m	Yuji Tsutsumi; Japan (JPN)	56.45 m
Hammer throw	Matthew Denny; Queensland	73.37 m	Jack Dalton; Victoria	68.14 m	Huw Peacock; Tasmania	64.94 m
Javelin throw	Hamish Peacock; Tasmania	84.36 m	Luke Cann; Western Australia	79.58 m	Sumedha Ranasinghe; Sri Lanka (SRI)	77.92 m
Decathlon	Cedric Dubler; Queensland	7779 pts	John Lane; Great Britain (GBR)	7362 pts	Aaron Booth; New Zealand (NZL)	7246 pts
10,000 metres walk	Dane Bird-Smith; Queensland	38:34.23	Rhydian Cowley; Victoria	41:35.60	Tyler Jones; New South Wales	42:01.39

=== Women ===
Event	Gold		Silver		Bronze	
100 metres (Wind: +0.4)	Toea Wisil; Queensland	11.42	Melissa Breen; Australian Capital Territory	11.64	Margaret Gayen; South Australia	11.78
200 metres (Wind: -2.4)	Toea Wisil; Queensland	23.76	Ella Nelson; New South Wales	23.91	Larissa Pasternatsky; New South Wales	24.28 24.271
400 metres	Morgan Mitchell; Victoria	52.08	Olivia Tauro; New South Wales	53.10	Lauren Wells; Australian Capital Territory	53.84
800 metres	Lora Storey; New South Wales	2:05.56	Anneliese Rubie; New South Wales	2:05.93	Georgia Griffith; Victoria	2:06.00
1500 metres	Heidi See; New South Wales	4:23.99	Zoe Buckman; Victoria	4:24.33	Linden Hall; Victoria	4:24.53
5000 metres	Heidi See; New South Wales	15:51.97	Jessica Trengove; South Australia	16:02.66	Paige Campbell; New South Wales	16:09.26
10,000 metres	Camille Buscomb; New Zealand (NZL)	32:34.41	Bridey Delaney; New South Wales	33:04.72	Makda Harun; Victoria	33:05.73
100 metres hurdles (Wind: +2.3)	Sally Pearson; Queensland	12.53	Brianna Beahan; Western Australia	12.96	Michelle Jenneke; New South Wales	13.12
400 metres hurdles	Lauren Wells; Australian Capital Territory	56.60	Genevieve Cowie; New South Wales	58.41	Sara Klein; New South Wales	58.68
3000 metres steeplechase	Victoria Mitchell; Victoria	9:44.09	Stella Radford; Victoria	9:56.47	Charlotte Wilson; Victoria	10:03.85
4 × 100 m relay	New South Wales (NSW); Larissa Pasternatsky; Tavleen Singh; Gabriella O'Grady; Jasmine Everett	46.07	Queensland (QLD); Summer Johnson; Jacinta Beecher; Lauren O'Sullivan; Toea Wisil	46.32	Western Australia (WA); Emily Dixon; Julia Phillips; Sophie White; Eliza Wilson	46.43
4 × 400 m relay	New South Wales (NSW); Carley Thomas; Olivia Tauro; Bethany Halmy; Bendere Oboya	3:39.79	Victoria (VIC); Emily Lawson; Jemima Russell; Ashleigh Horrobin; Sarah Billings	3:42.26	Western Australia (WA); Adele Smith; Kobi Nichols; Kiara Reddingius; Lyndsay Pekin	3:42.52
High jump	Eleanor Patterson; Victoria	1.83 m	Zoe Timmers; Western Australia	1.83 m	Clare Gibson; Western Australia	1.83 m
Pole vault	Eliza McCartney; New Zealand (NZL)	4.50 m	Liz Parnov; Western Australia	4.30 m	Olivia McTaggart; New Zealand (NZL)	4.30 m
Long jump	Naa Anang; Queensland	6.50 m (+1.5 m/s)	Margaret Gayen; South Australia	6.27 m (+1.2 m/s)	Kelsey Berryman; New Zealand (NZL)	6.24 m (+0.6 m/s)
Triple jump	Meggan O'Riley; Victoria	13.30 m (+0.6 m/s)	Tay-Leiha Clark; New South Wales	13.26 m (+0.9 m/s)	Kaede Miyasaka; Japan (JPN)	13.20 m (+1.2 m/s)
Shot put	Alifatou Djibril; South Australia	14.56 m	Siiva Tafiti; Queensland	14.23 m	Brianna Bortolanza; Queensland	14.21 m
Discus throw	Dani Stevens; New South Wales	65.07 m	Taryn Gollshewsky; Queensland	57.05 m	Kimberley Mulhall; Victoria	54.17 m
Hammer throw	Lara Nielsen; Queensland	66.31 m	Alexandra Hulley; New South Wales	64.25 m	Akane Watanbe; Japan (JPN)	60.97 m
Javelin throw	Kelsey-Lee Roberts; Australian Capital Territory	61.40 m	Tori Peeters; New Zealand (NZL)	56.74 m	Risa Miyashita; Japan (JPN)	54.07 m
Heptathlon	Alysha Burnett; New South Wales	5817 pts	Portia Bing; New Zealand (NZL)	5752 pts	Kiara Reddingius; Western Australia	5382 pts
10,000 metres walk	Katie Hayward; Queensland	45:51.09	Rachel Tallent; Victoria	46:24.07	Jessica Pickles; Queensland	46:31.34
