= 2014–15 Australian Athletics Championships =

- Dates: 26–29 March 2015
- Host city: Brisbane, Australia
- Venue: Queensland Sport and Athletics Centre
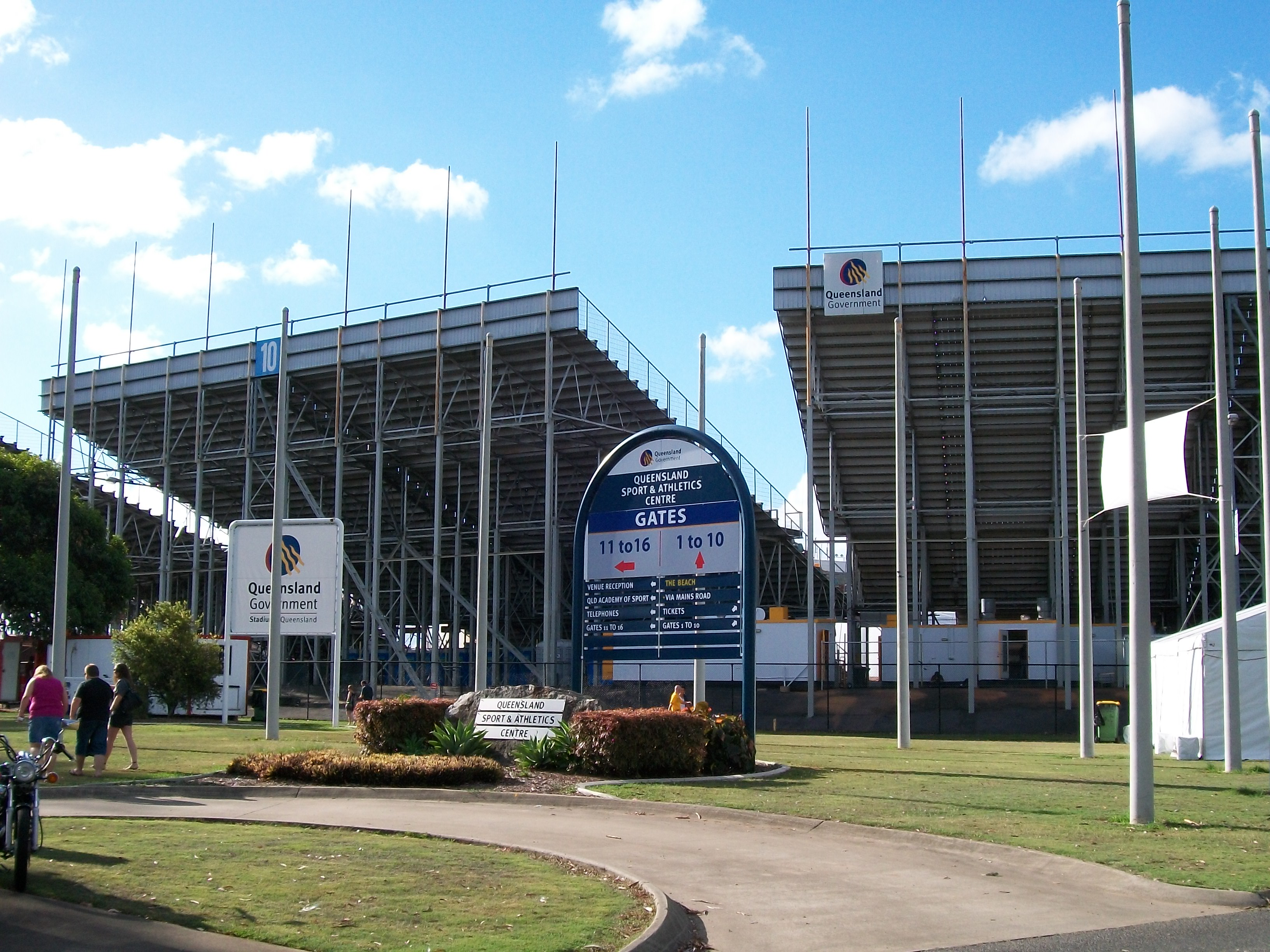

The 2014–15 Australian Athletics Championships was the 93rd edition of the national championship in outdoor track and field for Australia. It was held from 26–29 March 2015 at the Queensland Sport and Athletics Centre in Brisbane. It served as the selection meeting for Australia at the 2015 World Championships in Athletics. Distance events were held separately, with the 10,000 metres taking place at the Zatopek 10K on 11 December 2014 at Lakeside Stadium in Melbourne, the men's 5000 metres being held at the same location on 21 March 2015, and the women's 5000 m taking place at Sydney Olympic Park on 14 March 2015.

== Medal summary ==
=== Men ===
Event	Gold		Silver		Bronze	
100 metres (Wind: +1.1)	Josh Clarke; New South Wales	10.19	Banuve Tabakaucoro; Fiji (FIJ)	10.26	Alex Hartmann; Queensland	10.30
200 metres (Wind: +1.7)	Banuve Tabakaucoro; Fiji (FIJ)	20.63	Alex Hartmann; Queensland	20.67	Craig Burns; Queensland	20.81
400 metres	Craig Burns; Queensland	45.94	Alex Beck; Queensland	46.36	Iain Douglas; Victoria	46.95
800 metres	Jeff Riseley; Victoria	1:47.13	Alexander Rowe; Victoria	1:48.14	Josh Ralph; New South Wales	1:48.38
3000 metres	Brenton Rowe; Victoria	8:07.52	Jack Rayner; Victoria	8:13.29	Josh Harris; Tasmania	8:14.38
5000 metres	Brett Robinson; Victoria	13:32.54	Ben St Lawrence; New South Wales	13:33.16	Jeff See; United States (USA)	13:33.18
10,000 metres	Brett Robinson; Victoria	28:45.36	Duer Yoa; Victoria	28:46.46	Samsom Gebreyohannes; Eritrea (ERI)	28:49.42
110 metres hurdles (Wind: +1.5)	Nicholas Hough; New South Wales	13.42	Sam Baines; Victoria	13.54	Joshua Hawkins; New Zealand (NZL)	13.69
400 metres hurdles	Cameron French; New Zealand (NZL)	50.05	Tristan Thomas; Tasmania	50.31	Leigh Bennett; New South Wales	51.08
3000 metres steeplechase	Craig Appleby; Victoria	8:54.81	Jackson Elliott; Queensland	9:03.25	Daryl Crook; Queensland	9:05.62
High jump	Brandon Starc; New South Wales	2.28 m	Liam Zamel-Paez; Queensland	2.20 m	Thomas Brennan; Western Australia	2.15 m
Pole vault	Angus Armstrong; New South Wales	5.35 m (jump-off)	Kurtis Marschall; South Australia	5.20 m (jump-off)	Nick Southgate; New Zealand (NZL)	5.20 m
Long jump	Robert Crowther; Queensland	8.05 m (+0.5 m/s)	Yohei Sugai; Japan (JPN)	8.00 m (+2.2 m/s)	Darcy Roper; Queensland	7.91 m (+1.6 m/s)
Triple jump	Alwyn Jones; Victoria	15.98 m (+0.6 m/s)	Alex Lorraway; Victoria	15.69 m (-0.1 m/s)	Ryoma Yamamoto; Japan (JPN)	15.65 m (+0.5 m/s)
Shot put	Jacko Gill; New Zealand (NZL)	20.75 m	Damien Birkinhead; Victoria	19.04 m	Matthew Cowie; Western Australia	16.59 m
Discus throw	Julian Wruck; Queensland	62.03 m	Matthew Denny; Queensland	58.16 m	Matt Stopel; Queensland	57.55 m
Hammer throw	Matthew Denny; Queensland	69.15 m	Hiroshi Noguchi; Japan (JPN)	65.57 m	Huw Peacock; Tasmania	63.49 m
Javelin throw	Matthew Outzen; New South Wales	80.00 m	Hamish Peacock; Tasmania	79.55 m	Ben Langton Burnell; New Zealand (NZL)	73.46 m
Decathlon	David Brock; Victoria	7733 pts	Kyle Cranston; New South Wales	7629 pts	Brent Newdick; New Zealand (NZL)	7136 pts
10,000 metres	Dane Bird-Smith; Queensland	39:53.89	Rhydian Cowley; Victoria	42:29.00	Luke McCutcheon; Queensland	49:24.26

=== Women ===
Event	Gold		Silver		Bronze	
100 metres	Melissa Breen; Australian Capital Territory	11.26	Toea Wisil; Queensland	11.40	Ashleigh Whittaker; Victoria	11.47
200 metres (Wind: +1.6)	Ella Nelson; New South Wales	23.04	Ashleigh Whittaker; Victoria	23.26	Melissa Breen; Australian Capital Territory	23.29
400 metres	Anneliese Rubie; New South Wales	52.77	Morgan Mitchell; Victoria	52.94	Caitlin Sargent; Queensland	53.01
800 metres	Brittany McGowan; Queensland	2:03.49	Abbey de la Motte; Victoria	2:04.81	Selma Kajan; New South Wales	2:05.43
1500 metres	Heidi See; New South Wales	4:09.60	Zoe Buckman; Victoria	4:10.32	Trychelle Kingdom; New South Wales	4:10.83
3000 metres	Bridey Delaney; New South Wales	9:23.98	Natalie Archer; New South Wales	9:39.77	Alexandra Paterson; Victoria	10:22.23
5000 metres	Magdalene Masai; Kenya (KEN)	15:10.46	Madeline Hills; New South Wales	15:21.09	Susan Kuijken; Netherlands (NED)	15:29.60
10,000 metres	Veronicah Wanjiru; Kenya (KEN)	32:22.22	Eloise Wellings; New South Wales	32:26.59	Madeline Heiner; New South Wales	32:44.71
100 metres hurdles (Wind: +1.3)	Sally Pearson; Queensland	12.59	Michelle Jenneke; New South Wales	12.82	Abbie Taddeo; New South Wales	13.33
400 metres hurdles	Lauren Wells; Australian Capital Territory	56.51	Satomi Kubokura; Japan (JPN)	57.16	Betty Burua; Papua New Guinea (PNG)	58.02
3000 metres steeplechase	Genevieve LaCaze; Victoria	9:52.86	Paige Campbell; New South Wales	10:48.59	Stephanie Kondogonis; Victoria	10:57.17
High jump	Eleanor Patterson; Victoria	1.91 m	Cassie Purdon; Queensland	1.88 m	Keeley O'Hagan; New Zealand (NZL)	1.85 m
Pole vault	Alana Boyd; Queensland	4.60 m	Nina Kennedy; Western Australia	4.20 m	Melissa Gergal; United States (USA)	4.20 m
Long jump	Chelsea Jaensch; Queensland	6.74 m (+3.2 m/s)	Brooke Stratton; Victoria	6.60 m (+0.7 m/s)	Corinna Minko; Victoria	6.34 m (+2.6 m/s)
Triple jump	Nneka Okpala; New Zealand (NZL)	13.48 m (+0.4 m/s)	Ellen Pettitt; Victoria	13.46 m (+2.9 m/s)	Alison Ruse; New South Wales	12.79 m (+1.6 m/s)
Shot put	Chelsea Lenarduzzi; New South Wales	15.27 m	Te Rina Keenan; New Zealand (NZL)	15.16 m	Chiaki Yokomizo; Japan (JPN)	15.11 m
Discus throw	Dani Samuels; New South Wales	64.44 m	Taryn Gollshewsky; Queensland	55.85 m	Christie Chamberlain; New South Wales	53.91 m
Hammer throw	Lara Nielsen; Queensland	66.37 m	Alexandra Hulley; New South Wales	63.61 m	Kaysanne Hockey; Queensland	59.13 m
Javelin throw	Sunette Viljoen; South Africa (RSA)	63.29 m	Kim Mickle; Western Australia	61.02 m	Kelsey-Lee Roberts; Australian Capital Territory	58.61 m
Heptathlon	Veronica Torr; New Zealand (NZL)	5665pts	Ashleigh Hamilton; Victoria	5295pts	Portia Bing; New Zealand (NZL)	5181pts
10,000 metres	Tanya Holliday; South Australia	44:56.44	Kirsty Klein; New South Wales	49:33.06	Only two finishers	
