= 2017–18 Australian Athletics Championships =

- Dates: 15–18 February 2018
- Host city: Gold Coast, Australia
- Venue: Carrara Stadium
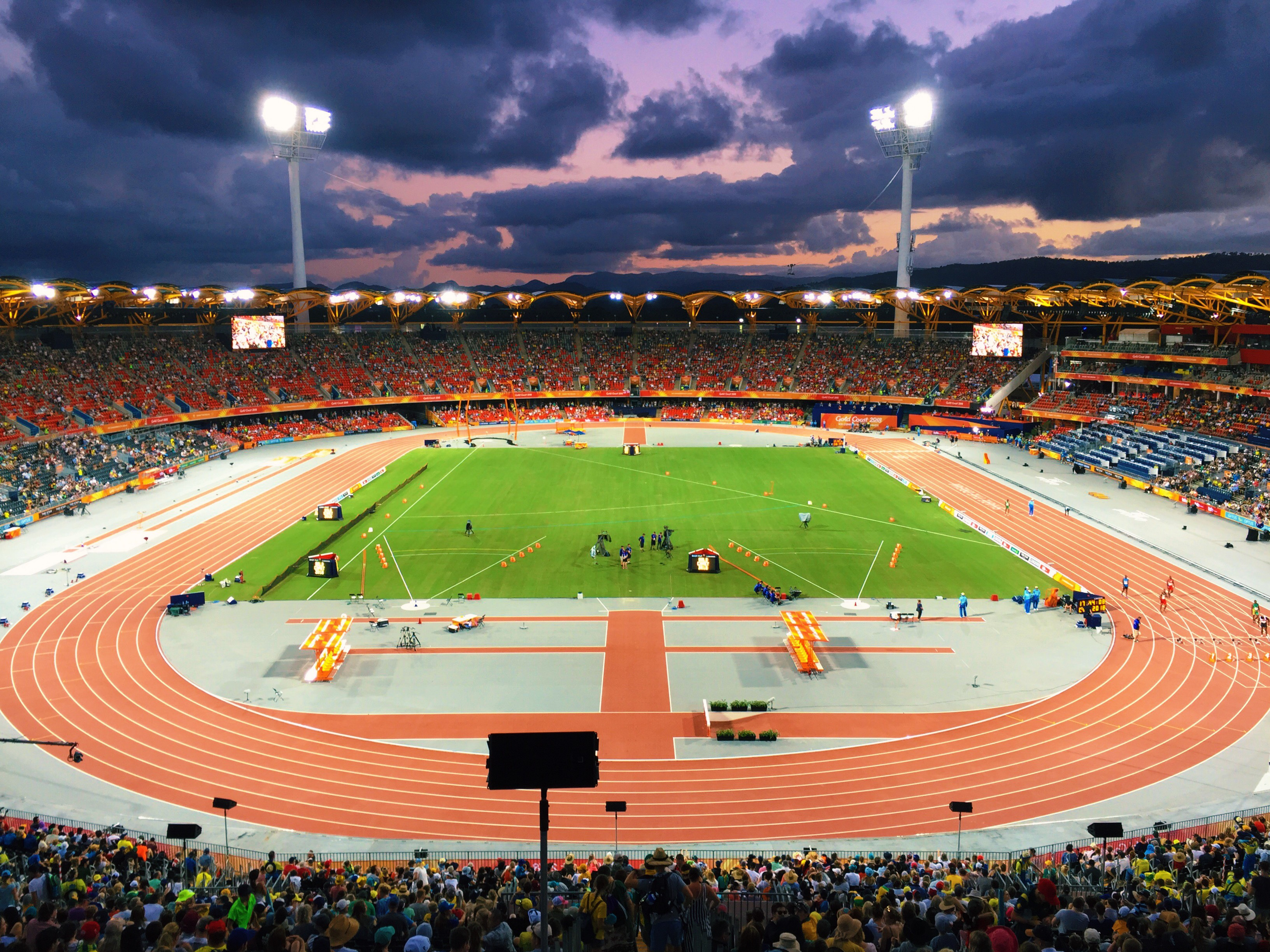

The 2017–18 Australian Athletics Championships was the 96th edition of the national championship in outdoor track and field for Australia. It was held from 15 to 18 February 2018 at Carrara Stadium in Gold Coast, Queensland. It served as the selection meeting in athletics events for Australia at the 2018 Commonwealth Games. Distance events were held separately, with the 10,000 metres taking place at the Zatopek 10K on 14 December 2017 at Lakeside Stadium in Melbourne and the 10,000 metres race walk was held in Canberra on 14 January 2018.

== Medal summary ==
=== Men ===
Event	Gold		Silver		Bronze	
100 metres (Wind: +0.4)	Trae Williams; Queensland	10.10	Rohan Browning; New South Wales	10.20	Josh Clarke; New South Wales	10.31
200 metres (Wind: -2.1)	Alex Hartmann; Queensland	20.57	Joseph Millar; New Zealand (NZL)	20.60	Zane Branco; Queensland	20.83
400 metres	Murray Goodwin; Queensland	46.24	Daniel Mowen; Queensland	46.37	Alex Beck; Queensland	46.61
800 metres	Luke Mathews; Victoria	1:45.90	Josh Ralph; New South Wales	1:46.85	Jeff Riseley; Victoria	1:47.04
1500 metres	Ryan Gregson; Victoria	3:39.66	Jordan Williamsz; Victoria	3:39.85	Rorey Hunter; New South Wales	3:40.12
5000 metres	Morgan McDonald; New South Wales	13:19.05	David McNeill; Victoria	13:19.51	Stewart McSweyn; Tasmania	13:19.96
10,000 metres	Stewart McSweyn; Tasmania	28:37.28	Patrick Tiernan; Queensland	28:38.94	David McNeill; Victoria	28:47.54
110 metres hurdles (Wind: -0.2)	Nicholas Hough; New South Wales	13.76	Justin Merlino; New South Wales	13.94	Jacob McCorry; New South Wales	14.02
400 metres hurdles	Ian Dewhurst; Western Australia	49.80	Angus Proudfoot; Australian Capital Territory	50.37	Leigh Bennett; New South Wales	50.73
4 × 100 m relay	New South Wales (NSW); Harrison Andrews; Joshua Swan; Lachlan Parry; Anas Abu-Ganaba	40.45	Victoria (VIC); Michael James; Michael Hansford; Paul Parker; Christopher Mitrevski	41.13	South Australia (SA); Harrison Hunt; Ryan Atkins; Liam Moss; Kuei Kuei	41.29
4 × 400 m relay	Victoria (VIC); Conrad Coumaros; Matthew Scott; Harrison Roubin; Liam Procaccino	3:10.96	New South Wales (NSW); Jordan Sarmento; Ian Halpin; James Kermond; Keegan Bell	3:11.80	Western Australia (WA); Alexander Di Medio; Toby Plant; Luke Major; Brenton Mizen	3:15.59
High jump	Brandon Starc; New South Wales	2.28 m	Nik Bojic; Queensland Joel Baden; Victoria	2.21 m	Not awarded	
Pole vault	Kurtis Marschall; South Australia	5.55 m	Declan Carruthers; Western Australia	5.45 m	Nicholas Southgate; New Zealand (NZL)	5.25 m
Long jump	Christopher Mitrevski; Victoria	8.09 m (+2.1 m/s)	Liam Adcock; Queensland	7.81 m (+0.7 m/s)	Henry Smith; Victoria	7.78 m (+0.2 m/s)
Triple jump	Emmanuel Fakiye; New South Wales	16.08 m (-0.8 m/s)	Alwyn Jones; Victoria	15.99 m (+0.9 m/s)	Shemaiah James; Queensland	15.92 m (-0.1 m/s)
Shot put	Damien Birkinhead; Victoria	20.02 m	Aiden Harvey; New South Wales	17.82 m	Matthew Cowie; Western Australia	17.70 m
Discus throw	Matthew Denny; Queensland	64.03 m	Benn Harradine; Queensland	63.56 m	Julian Wruck; Queensland	60.96 m
Hammer throw	Matthew Denny; Queensland	72.78 m	Jack Dalton; Victoria	65.78 m	Costa Kousparis; New South Wales	65.42 m
Javelin throw	Hamish Peacock; Tasmania	79.38 m	Benjamin Langton Burnell; New Zealand (NZL)	78.20 m	Josh Robinson; Queensland	77.21 m
Decathlon	Cedric Dubler; Queensland	8229	Kyle Cranston; New South Wales	7786	Alec Diamond; New South Wales	7405
10,000 metres walk	Perseus Karlström; Sweden (SWE)	39:22.41	Evan Dunfee; Canada (CAN)	40:11.80	Marius Žiūkas; Lithuania (LTU)	40:43.17

=== Women ===
Event	Gold		Silver		Bronze	
100 metres (Wind: -0.4)	Riley Day; Queensland	11.56	Zoe Hobbs; New Zealand (NZL)	11.70	Mia Gross; Victoria	11.81
200 metres (Wind: -1.7)	Riley Day; Queensland	22.93	Maddie Coates; Victoria	23.06	Larissa Pasternatsky; New South Wales	23.27
400 metres	Anneliese Rubie; New South Wales	51.92	Bendere Oboya; New South Wales	51.94	Morgan Mitchell; Victoria	52.69
800 metres	Brittany McGowan; Queensland	2:00.24	Angie Petty; New Zealand (NZL)	2:00.73	Georgia Griffith; Victoria	2:02.09
1500 metres	Linden Hall; Victoria	4:07.55	Zoe Buckman; Victoria	4:08.15	Chloe Tighe; New South Wales	4:11.12
5000 metres	Celia Sullohern; New South Wales	15:34.42	Madeline Hills; New South Wales	15:35.50	Eloise Wellings; New South Wales	15:37.47
10,000 metres	Celia Sullohern; New South Wales	32:31.22	Jessica Trengove; South Australia	32:35.06	Eloise Wellings; New South Wales	32:41.96
100 metres hurdles (Wind: +1.1)	Sally Pearson; Queensland	12.73	Michelle Jenneke; New South Wales	13.14	Brianna Beahan; Western Australia	13.16
400 metres hurdles	Lauren Wells; Australian Capital Territory	56.06	Daniela Roman; Victoria	56.59	Sarah Carli; New South Wales	56.87
3000 metres steeplechase	Victoria Mitchell; New South Wales	9:45.37	Paige Campbell; New South Wales	9:49.00	Rosie Donegan; Victoria	9:50.61
4 × 100 m relay	New South Wales (NSW); Jasmine Everett; Larissa Pasternatsky; Abbie Taddeo; Michelle Jenneke	45.61	Victoria (VIC); Jemima Russell; Christine Byrne; Georgie Boal; Holly Dobbyn	46.25	Western Australia (WA); Kiara Reddingius; Kobi Nichols; Sinta Wardana; Katherine Sparrow	46.29
4 × 400 m relay	Queensland (QLD); Cara Jardine; Courtney Geraghty; Ashleigh Jones; Caitlin Sargent-Jones	3:37.15	Western Australia (WA); Kobi Nichols; Lyndsay Troode; Kiara Reddingius; Katherine Sparrow	3:40.52	New South Wales (NSW); Olivia Cason; Danica Sardelich; Jessica Thornton; Gabriella O'Grady	3:40.94
High jump	Cassie Purdon; Queensland	1.86 m	Eleanor Patterson; Victoria	1.83 m	Zoe Timmers; Western Australia	1.80 m
Pole vault	Nina Kennedy; Western Australia	4.60 m	Liz Parnov; Western Australia	4.25 m	Olivia McTaggart; New Zealand (NZL)	4.10 m
Long jump	Brooke Stratton; Victoria	6.66 m (+1.7 m/s)	Naa Anang; Queensland	6.66 m (+1.3 m/s)	Lauren Wells; Australian Capital Territory	6.49 m (+0.1 m/s)
Triple jump	Meggan O'Riley; Victoria	13.44 m (+1.5 m/s)	Ellen Pettitt; Victoria	13.17 m (+0.9 m/s)	Tay-Leiha Clark; New South Wales	13.16 m (+0.2 m/s)
Shot put	Maddi Wesche; New Zealand (NZL)	16.45 m	Chelsea Lenarduzzi; Queensland	15.93 m	Sarah Thorpe; Queensland	14.00 m
Discus throw	Dani Stevens; New South Wales	65.30 m	Taryn Gollshewsky; Queensland	58.67 m	Te Rina Keenan; New Zealand (NZL)	56.39 m
Hammer throw	Alexandra Hulley; New South Wales	64.84 m	Lara Nielsen; Queensland	64.69 m	Kaysanne Hockey; Queensland	57.59 m
Javelin throw	Kathryn Mitchell; Victoria	65.51 m	Kelsey-Lee Roberts; Australian Capital Territory	62.21 m	Kathryn Brooks; Victoria	51.31 m
Heptathlon	Celeste Mucci; Victoria	5812 pts	Kiara Reddingius; Western Australia	5742 pts	Alysha Burnett; New South Wales	5699 pts
10,000 metres walk	Beki Smith; New South Wales	45:56.08	Alana Barber; New Zealand (NZL)	46:03.24	Claire Tallent; South Australia	46:06.59
