= 2018–19 Australian Athletics Championships =

- Dates: 4–7 April 2019
- Host city: Sydney, Australia
- Venue: Sydney Olympic Park Athletic Centre
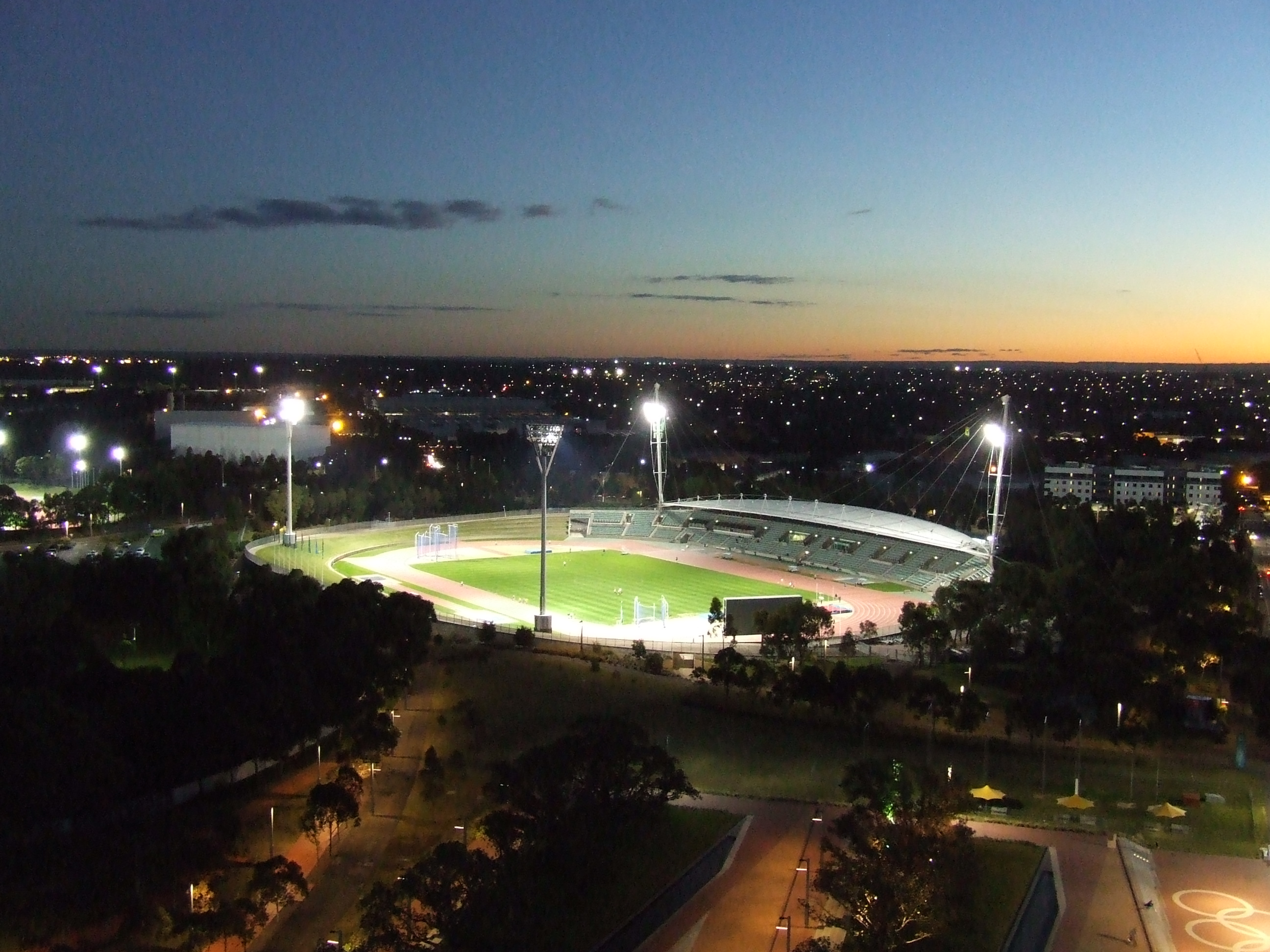

The 2018–19 Australian Athletics Championships was the 97th edition of the national championship in outdoor track and field for Australia. It was held from 4–7 April 2019 at the Sydney Olympic Park Athletic Centre in Sydney. It served as the selection meeting for Australia at the 2019 World Athletics Championships. Distance events were held separately, with the 10,000 metres taking place at the Zatopek 10K on 13 December 2018 at Lakeside Stadium in Melbourne, the mile run taking place at the Albie Thomas meet at the Crest Athletic Centre in Bankstown on 22 December 2018, and the 5000 metres taking place at the Sydney Track Classic on 23 February 2019.

== Medal summary ==
=== Men ===
Event	Gold		Silver		Bronze	
100 metres (Wind: -0.2)	Edward Nketia; Australian Capital Territory	10.22	Rohan Browning; New South Wales	10.28	Jack Hale; Tasmania	10.34
200 metres (Wind: +0.7)	Alex Hartmann; Queensland	20.68	Jake Doran; Queensland	20.76	Abdoulie Assim; Gambia (GAM)	20.87
400 metres	Steven Solomon; New South Wales	45.99	Alex Beck; Queensland	46.31	Ilhwan Mo; South Korea (KOR)	46.54
800 metres	Peter Bol; Victoria	1:46.12	Josh Ralph; New South Wales	1:46.15	Mason Cohen; New South Wales	1:46.91
1500 metres	Luke Mathews; Victoria	3:43.15	Ryan Gregson; Queensland	3:44.03	Rorey Hunter; New South Wales	3:44.05
Mile run	Matthew Ramsden; Western Australia	3:59.18	Ryan Gregson; Victoria	3:59.95	Rorey Hunter; New South Wales	4:01.98
5000 metres	Jordan Gusman; Victoria	13:29.47	Stewart McSweyn; Tasmania	13:32.37	Liam Adams; Victoria	13:56.63
10,000 metres	Stewart McSweyn; Tasmania	27:50.89	Jack Rayner; Victoria	28:12.07	Jack Bruce; Queensland	28:49.70
110 metres hurdles (Wind: +0.2)	Nicholas Hough; New South Wales	13.55	Chen Kuei-ru; Chinese Taipei (TPE)	13.68	Yang Wei-ting; Chinese Taipei (TPE)	13.76
400 metres hurdles	Ian Dewhurst; Western Australia	50.29	Michael Cochrane; New Zealand (NZL)	50.94	Chanho Lim; South Korea (KOR)	51.03
3000 metres steeplechase	Max Stevens; South Australia	8:39.31	James Nipperess; New South Wales	8:43.09	Ben Buckingham; Victoria	8:47.14
4 × 100 m relay	South Korea (KOR); Kukyoung Kim; Jaeha Lee; Seunghwan Ko; Jaeseong Lee	39.52	New South Wales (NSW); Joshua Azzopardi; Zach Holdsworth; Nicholas Bate; Anas Abu-Ganaba	40.21	South Australia (SA); Max Hagicostas; Harrison Hunt; Ryan Atkins; Liam Moss	40.96
4 × 400 m relay	New South Wales (NSW); Sean Fitzsimmons; Ian Halpin; Matthew Crowe; Tyler Gunn	3:10.15	Victoria (VIC); Conrad Coumaros; Liam Procaccino; Michael Tsotsos; Christian Davis	3:10.46	South Australia (SA); Oli Callahan; Casey Buchanan; Robert Broadhead; Brett Fisk	3:19.97
High jump	Joel Baden; Victoria	2.30 m	Woo Sang-hyeok; South Korea (KOR)	2.24 m	Nauraj Singh Randhawa; Malaysia (MAS)	2.20 m
Pole vault	Angus Armstrong; Western Australia	5.50 m	James Steyn; New Zealand (NZL)	5.50 m	David Thomson; Victoria	5.40 m r
Long jump	Henry Smith; Victoria	7.90 m (0.0 m/s)	Christopher Mitrevski; Victoria	7.83 m (0.0 m/s)	Joshua Cowley; Queensland	7.79 m (0.0 m/s)
Triple jump	Alwyn Jones; Victoria	15.95 m (+0.7 m/s)	Ayo Ore; Victoria	15.77 m (0.0 m/s)	Emmanuel Fakiye; New South Wales	15.74 m (+0.2 m/s)
Shot put	Tom Walsh; New Zealand (NZL)	21.91 m	Damien Birkinhead; Victoria	19.79 m	Jan Jeuschede; Germany (GER)	18.39 m
Discus throw	Matthew Denny; Queensland	65.28 m	Mitchell Cooper; Queensland	59.75 m	Lachlan Page; South Australia	54.74 m
Hammer throw	Costa Kousparis; New South Wales	65.11 m	Huw Peacock; Tasmania	63.26 m	Ned Weatherly; Victoria	62.52 m
Javelin throw	Hamish Peacock; Tasmania	78.12 m	William White; Queensland	74.95 m	Nash Lowis; Queensland	74.73 m
Decathlon	Daniel Golubovic; United States (USA)	7901 pts	Kyle Cranston; New South Wales	7594 pts	David Brock; Victoria	7539 pts
10,000 metres walk	Dane Bird-Smith; Queensland	38:30.61	Rhydian Cowley; Victoria	40:44.81	Quentin Rew; New Zealand (NZL)	41:02.24 >

=== Women ===
Event	Gold		Silver		Bronze	
100 metres (Wind: +0.1)	Naa Anang; Queensland	11.32	Zoe Hobbs; New Zealand (NZL)	11.44	Maddie Coates; Victoria	11.52
200 metres (Wind: -1.2)	Zoe Hobbs; New Zealand (NZL)	23.42	Maddie Coates; Victoria	23.50	Nana Adoma Owusu-Afriyie; Victoria	23.64
400 metres	Bendere Oboya; New South Wales	52.00	Caitlin Sargent-Jones; Queensland	53.20	Angeline Blackburn; Australian Capital Territory	53.36
800 metres	Catriona Bisset; Victoria	2:00.48	Georgia Griffith; Victoria	2:01.26	Morgan Mitchell; Victoria	2:01.60
1500 metres	Chloe Tighe; New South Wales	4:11.74	Madeleine Murray; Victoria	4:12.22	Bernadette Williams; Western Australia	4:15.25
Mile run	Whitney Sharpe; Victoria	4:37.35	Genevieve Gregson; Victoria	4:37.66	Rose Davies; New South Wales	4:39.77
5000 metres	Melissa Duncan; Victoria	15:29.70	Paige Campbell; New South Wales	15:31.50	Sinead Diver; Victoria	15:35.70
10,000 metres	Hitomi Niiya; Japan (JPN)	31:32.50	Sinead Diver; Victoria	31:50.98	Ellie Pashley; Victoria	32:17.81
100 metres hurdles (Wind: 0.0)	Celeste Mucci; Victoria	13.09	Brianna Beahan; Western Australia	13.11	Michelle Jenneke; Queensland	13.12
400 metres hurdles	Lauren Wells; Australian Capital Territory	54.87	Portia Bing; New Zealand (NZL)	55.86	Sarah Carli; New South Wales	56.08
3000 metres steeplechase	Paige E Campbell; New South Wales	9:49.68	Yukari Ishizawa; Japan (JPN)	10:01.03	Stella Radford; Victoria	10:06.13
4 × 100 m relay	New South Wales (NSW); Larissa Pasternatsky; Kristie Edwards; Abbie Taddeo; Stephanie Power	45.68	Tasmania (TAS); Abby Chapman; Morgan Gaffney; Kiara Calvert; Kiani Allen	46.39	Western Australia (WA); Katherine Sparrow; Taylah Cruttenden; Sinta Wardana; Sophie White	46.59
4 × 400 m relay	Victoria (VIC); Lily Bayes; Morgan Mitchell; Jessica Gulli-Nance; Catriona Bisset	3:39.05	New South Wales (NSW); Jasmin Guthrie; Isabella Guthrie; Bethany Halmy; Rebecca Bennett	3:43.65	Western Australia (WA); Katherine Sparrow; Emma Philippe; Sarah Hynes; Bernadette Williams	3:53.35
High jump	Nicola McDermott; New South Wales	1.92 m	Josephine Reeves; New Zealand (NZL)	1.86 m	Hannah Joye; Queensland	1.82 m
Pole vault	Olivia McTaggart; New Zealand (NZL)	4.30 m	Lisa Campbell; Queensland	4.30 m	Lauren Hyde-Cooling; Western Australia	4.10 m
Long jump	Naa Anang; Queensland	6.88 m (+2.4 m/s)	Brooke Stratton; Victoria	6.70 m (+1.7 m/s)	Jessie Harper; Queensland	6.45 m (0.0 m/s)
Triple jump	Ellen Pettitt; Victoria	13.36 m (0.0 m/s)	Aliyah Johnson; Queensland	13.21 m (0.0 m/s)	Mariya Siney; Ukraine (UKR)	12.99 m (0.0 m/s)
Shot put	Victoria Owers; New Zealand (NZL)	15.87 m	Emma Berg; Victoria	14.24 m	Taryn Gollshewsky; Queensland	14.08 m
Discus throw	Taryn Gollshewsky; Queensland	56.38 m	Kimberley Mulhall; Victoria	54.95 m	Talosaga Kia; Queensland	50.97 m
Hammer throw	Alexandra Hulley; New South Wales	65.49 m	Lauren Bruce; New Zealand (NZL)	58.73 m	Stephanie Ratcliffe; Victoria	56.54 m
Javelin throw	Kelsey-Lee Barber; Australian Capital Territory	63.33 m	Kathryn Mitchell; Victoria	62.78 m	Tori Peeters; New Zealand (NZL)	56.49 m
Heptathlon	Celeste Mucci; Victoria	5844 pts	Alysha Burnett; New South Wales	5716 pts	Tori West; Queensland	5466 pts
10,000 metres walk	Katie Hayward; Queensland	43:20.65	Jemima Montag; Victoria	43:51.47	Rachel Tallent; Victoria	46:10.54
