= Hannah Jones (hurdler) =

Australian hurdler (born 1995)

Personal information
- Nationality: Australia
- Born: 5 October 1995 (age 30)
- Home town: Cherrybrook, New South Wales, Australia
- Education: University of New South Wales

Sport
- Sport: Athletics
- Events: 100 metres hurdles 60 metres hurdles
- Coached by: Sally Pearson

Achievements and titles
- National finals: 2012 Australian U18s; • 100m hurdles, 3rd (bronze); 2016 Australian Champs; • 100m hurdles, 8th; 2017 Australian Champs; • 100m hurdles, 6th; 2018 Australian Champs; • 100m hurdles, 7th; 2019 Australian Champs; • 100m hurdles, 6th; 2021 Australian Champs; • 100m hurdles, 2nd (silver); 2022 Australian Champs; • 100m hurdles, 5th; 2023 Australian Champs; • 100m hurdles, 3rd (bronze)
- Personal bests: 100mH: • 12.91 (+0.5) (2021); • 12.80w (+2.5) (2023)
- Updated on 28 December 2023

Hannah Jones (born 5 October 1995) is an Australian hurdler specializing in the 100 metres hurdles. She was the bronze medalist at the 2023 Australian Athletics Championships, qualifying her for the world championships where she did not advance to the semi-finals.

== Biography ==
Jones is from the Cherrybrook suburb of Sydney. She had a successful under-20 athletics career, winning a bronze medal at the 2012 Australian U18 championships. At the Australian trials for the 2014 World U20 Championships in Athletics, Jones won her semi-final but fell in the finals and did not make the team.

In 2019, Jones moved to Gold Coast, Queensland to be coached by Olympic gold medallist Sally Pearson while studying at the University of New South Wales.

In 2021, Jones achieved her best national placing with a runner-up finish at the Australian Athletics Championships, behind Liz Clay. Despite this, she was not selected for the Australian Olympic team. Her coach Sally Pearson said that Jones had the ability to push Clay to the line.

Jones had her best year in 2023, with multiple runs near or under 13 seconds. Jones qualified for the 2023 World Athletics Championships by placing 3rd at the 2023 Australian Athletics Championships. At the world championships, Jones finished 8th in her heat and did not advance to the semi-finals.

== Statistics ==
=== Personal bests ===
Event	Mark	Place	Competition	Venue	Date	Ref
100 metres hurdles	12.91 (+0.5 m/s)	1st place, gold medalist(s)	Oceania Invitational 1	Gold Coast, Australia	5 June 2021	
100 metres hurdles	12.80 w (+2.5 m/s)	1st place, gold medalist(s)	KBC Night of Athletics	Heusden, Belgium	15 July 2023	
