= Chris Mitrevski =

Australian long jumper (born 1996)

Personal information
- Full name: Christopher Mitrevski
- Nationality: Australia
- Born: 12 July 1996 (age 30)
- Home town: Victoria, Australia
- Education: Royal Melbourne Institute of Technology
- Height: 188 cm (6 ft 2 in)
- Weight: 73 kg (161 lb)

Sport
- Sport: Athletics
- Events: Long jump 100 metres
- Club: Athletics Essendon
- Coached by: John Boas

Achievements and titles
- National finals: 2014 Australian U20s; • Long jump, 3rd (bronze); 2015 Australian U20s; • Long jump, 2nd (silver); • 100 m, 4th; 2015 Australian Champs; • Long jump, 10th; 2016 Australian Champs; • Long jump, 5th; 2017 Australian Champs; • Long jump, 1st (gold); 2017 Australian Champs; • 4 × 100 m, 1st (gold); 2018 Australian Champs; • Long jump, 1st (gold); 2019 Australian Champs; • Long jump, 2nd (silver); 2021 Australian Champs; • Long jump, 3rd (bronze); 2022 Australian Champs; • Long jump, 1st (gold); 2023 Australian Champs; • Long jump, 4th
- Personal bests: LJ: 8.21 m (+0.8) (2022) 100 m: 10.27 (+1.0) (2022)
Medal record
Men's athletics
Representing Australia
Oceania Championships
Bronze medal – third place	2019 Townsville	Long jump
Gold medal – first place	2022 Mackay	Long jump
- Updated on 24 February 2024

Christopher Mitrevski (born 12 July 1996) is an Australian long jumper and sprinter. He is a two-time World Athletics Championships qualifier for Australia, and he was the 2022 Oceania Athletics Championships gold medallist in the long jump.

After winning the 2017 Australian Athletics Championships, he struggled with technical issues. His jumps at the 2022 Commonwealth Games were long enough to win the gold medal, but he jumped so far behind the board that he only finished 9th. He achieved his best World Athletics Championships placing in 2023, missing the finals by one centimetre.

== Career ==
Mitrevski began long jumping as early as 2007, and he finished 3rd at the 2016 Australian U20 Championships. In his first senior nationals at the 2015 Australian Athletics Championships, he competed in both the 100 metres and long jump, reaching the semifinals of the former and placing 10th overall in the latter. He placed 5th in the long jump the following year, failing to make the Australian team at the 2016 Olympics.

Mitrevski won his first national title at the 2017 Australian Athletics Championships in April, qualifying him for the World University Games where he finished 4th in the long jump. He defended his title at the 2018 Australian Athletics Championships, and went on to compete at that year's Commonwealth Games. At the Games, he qualified for the finals and finished 6th.

He won his first international medal at the 2019 Oceania Athletics Championships, finishing 3rd behind winner Henry Smith. At the 2019 World University Games, he again finished just outside of the long jump medals in 5th.

Due to a technical issue, Mitrevski struggled following 2019 and did not set another personal best in the long jump until 2022. Though there were a "multitude of reasons" for the issue, Mitrevski was not able to jump without over-rotating, failing to clear 8 metres in most of his attempts during this time. Due to the issue, he was not able to qualify for the Australian 2021 Olympic team.

Mitrevski returned to form to win the 2022 Australian Athletics Championships and the 2022 Oceania Athletics Championships. In his first World Championships in Eugene, he finished 16th in the qualification round and did not advance to the finals. He finished his season by competing in the 2022 Commonwealth Games, finishing 9th in the finals despite being ranked as the #1 seed coming in to the competition. He leapt far behind the board in his Commonwealth attempts, with commentator Dave Culbert saying that he could have jumped 50 cm farther had he taken off closer to the launch board. In particular, it was noted that his 7.70 m jump would have placed him in gold medal position had he jumped closer to the board.

In 2023, Mitrevski finished just 4th at the Australian Championships but nonetheless qualified for the 2023 World Championships. This time, he improved his qualification placing to 13th but still did not make the finals by just one centimetre. He finished 7th at the 2023 Weltklasse Zürich before ending his season.

== Personal life ==
Mitrevski is from Victoria, Australia where he studied marketing at the Royal Melbourne Institute of Technology. He trains with the Athletics Essendon club and is coached by John Boas. He drew inspiration from Mitchell Watt, the Oceania long jump record-holder.

Mitrevski works as a media analyst for Wavemaker Australia.

== Statistics ==
=== Personal best progression ===
Long Jump progression
#	Mark	Pl.	Competition	Venue	Date	Ref.
1	6.78 m (+1.3 m/s)	5th	Victorian U18 Championships	Melbourne, Australia	9 Feb 2013	
2	6.96 m (+1.6 m/s)	2nd place, silver medalist(s)	Melbourne High Velocity Club	Melbourne, Australia	1 Dec 2013	
3	7.12 m (-1.6 m/s)	3rd place, bronze medalist(s)	Melbourne High Velocity Club	Melbourne, Australia	1 Feb 2014	
4	7.32 m (0.0 m/s)	2nd place, silver medalist(s)	Victorian U20 Championships	Melbourne, Australia	16 Feb 2014	
5	7.45 m (+0.1 m/s)	1st place, gold medalist(s)	Victorian Championships	Melbourne, Australia	27 Feb 2015	
6	7.47 m (0.0 m/s)	1st place, gold medalist(s)	Victorian Country Champs at Landy Field	Geelong, Australia	23 Jan 2016	
7	7.70 m (+0.4 m/s)	1st place, gold medalist(s)	Victorian Championships	Melbourne, Australia	26 Feb 2016	
8	7.72 m (+1.3 m/s)	(bronze) (Qualification)	Australian Athletics Championships	Sydney, Australia	31 Mar 2016	
9	7.75 m (+0.6 m/s)	5th	Australian Athletics Championships	Sydney, Australia	2 Apr 2016	
10	7.92 m (+0.9 m/s)	1st place, gold medalist(s)	Shield at Doncaster	Melbourne, Australia	19 Nov 2016	
11	7.97 m (+1.5 m/s)	1st place, gold medalist(s)	SUMMERofATHS Grand Prix, AIS Track & Field Centre	Canberra, Australia	11 Mar 2017	
12	8.01 m (+1.0 m/s)	1st place, gold medalist(s)	Australian Athletics Championships	Gold Coast, Australia	17 Feb 2018	
13	8.05 m (+2.0 m/s)	1st place, gold medalist(s)	AVSL at Meadowglen	Melbourne, Australia	29 Nov 2019	
14	8.11 m (+0.2 m/s)	1st place, gold medalist(s)	Melbourne Track Classic	Melbourne, Australia	18 Mar 2022	
15	8.21 m (+0.8 m/s)	1st place, gold medalist(s)	Australian Athletics Championships	Sydney, Australia	1 Apr 2022	
15	8.32 m (-0.2 m/s)	1st place, gold medalist(s)	Australian Athletics Championships	Adelaide, Australia	12 Apr 2024	
