= 2015 IAAF World Relays – Women's distance medley relay =

Women's distance medley relay at the 2015 IAAF World Relays
- Venue: Thomas Robinson Stadium
- Dates: 2 May (final)
- Competitors: 24 from 6 nations
- Winning time: 10:36.50 (WR)

Medalists
gold medal	Treniere Moser; Sanya Richards-Ross; Ajee' Wilson; Shannon Rowbury; United States
silver medal	Selah Jepleting Busienei; Joy Nakhumicha Sakari; Sylivia Chematui Chesebe; Virginia Nyambura Nganga; Kenya
bronze medal	Katarzyna Broniatowska; Monika Szczęsna; Angelika Cichocka; Sofia Ennaoui; Poland

The women's distance medley relay at the 2015 IAAF World Relays was held at the Thomas Robinson Stadium on 2 May.

With the pre-meet world record being set by an American University (Villanova University), the first running of this event at the international level made this a ripe candidate for a new record.

The race was competitive through the first leg, with Rénelle Lamote of France have a marginal lead over Treniere Moser from the US, with Kenyan Selah Jepleting Busienei just a step behind. Then Olympic champion Sanya Richards-Ross blew the race open, passing before the backstretch and opening up almost 20 metres on the French and Kenyan teams. Young star Ajee' Wilson doubled the lead before handing off to Shannon Rowbury while Kenya pulled into second with the field tightening behind them. Rowbury, a world championship bronze medalist more than held her own, crossing the line in 10:36.50, the American team taking almost 12 seconds out of the old record. In their wake, Kenya, Poland, and Australia also finished under the old record.

== Records ==
Prior to the competition, the records were as follows:

World record	(United States) Villanova University (Kathy Franey, Michelle Bennett, Celeste Halliday, Vicki Huber)	10:48.38	Philadelphia, United States	28 April 1988
World Leading	Kenya	10:58.0	Nairobi, Kenya	10 April 2015

== Schedule ==
Date	Time	Round
2 May 2015	21:04	Final

All times are local times (UTC−4)

== Results ==
KEY:	WR	World record	AR	Area record

=== Final ===
The final was started at 21:08.

Rank	Lane	Nation	Athletes	Time	Notes
1st place, gold medalist(s)	5	United States	Treniere Moser, Sanya Richards-Ross, Ajee' Wilson, Shannon Rowbury	10:36.50	WR
2nd place, silver medalist(s)	2	Kenya	Selah Jepleting Busienei, Joy Nakhumicha Sakari, Sylivia Chematui Chesebe, Virginia Nyambura Nganga	10:43.35	AR
3rd place, bronze medalist(s)	6	Poland	Katarzyna Broniatowska, Monika Szczęsna, Angelika Cichocka, Sofia Ennaoui	10:45.32	AR
4	1	Australia	Melissa Duncan, Samantha Lind, Brittany McGowan, Heidi See	10:46.94	AR
5	4	Germany	Diana Sujew, Janin Lindenberg, Christina Hering, Gesa Felicitas Krause	11:06.14	
6	3	France	Rénelle Lamote, Elea-Mariama Diarra, Clarisse Moh, Claire Perraux	11:06.33	
