= Athletics at the 2018 Commonwealth Games – Women's hammer throw =

Women's hammer throw at the 2018 Commonwealth Games
- Venue: Carrara Stadium
- Dates: 10 April
- Competitors: 11 from 8 nations
- Winning distance: 69.94 m

Medalists
gold medal	Julia Ratcliffe	New Zealand
silver medal	Alexandra Hulley	Australia
bronze medal	Lara Nielsen	Australia

The women's hammer throw at the 2018 Commonwealth Games, as part of the athletics programme, took place in the Carrara Stadium on 10 April 2018.

Julia Ratcliffe won New Zealand's first ever gold medal in the event with a throw of 69.94 m (229 ft 5 1/2 in). The pre-event Commonwealth leader, Sophie Hitchon of England, exited the competition early with three foul throws.

== Records ==
Prior to this competition, the existing world and Games records were as follows:

World record	Anita Włodarczyk (POL)	82.98 m	Warsaw, Poland	28 August 2016
Games record	Sultana Frizell (CAN)	71.97 m	Glasgow, Scotland	28 July 2014

== Schedule ==
The schedule was as follows:

Date	Time	Round
Tuesday 10 April 2018	20:40	Final

All times are Australian Eastern Standard Time (UTC+10)

== Results ==
With eleven entrants, the event was held as a straight final.

=== Final ===
Rank	Name	#1	#2	#3	#4	#5	#6	Result	Notes
1st place, gold medalist(s)	Julia Ratcliffe (NZL)	66.19	68.60	68.14	68.56	69.94	67.81	69.94	
2nd place, silver medalist(s)	Alexandra Hulley (AUS)	x	68.20	67.34	x	66.77	63.86	68.20	
3rd place, bronze medalist(s)	Lara Nielsen (AUS)	63.80	65.03	58.52	x	63.19	63.60	65.03	
4	Sultana Frizell (CAN)	60.32	61.89	62.50	63.94	63.11	x	63.94	
5	Queen Obisesan (NGR)	63.84	62.95	62.01	62.40	61.77	x	63.84	
6	Carys Parry (WAL)	60.69	61.58	x	x	x	x	61.58	
7	Tynelle Gumbs (IVB)	60.97	60.80	x	59.88	x	x	60.97	NR
8	Danielle McConnell (AUS)	x	54.56	59.55	x	x	59.60	59.60	
9	Lucy Omondi (KEN)	42.51	44.17	45.59	—			45.59	
–	Sophie Hitchon (ENG)	x	x	x	—			NM	
–	Jillian Weir (CAN)	x	x	x	—			NM	
