= Nikki Chapple =

Australian long-distance runner

Personal information
- Born: 2/9/1981

Sport
- Sport: Athletics
- Event(s): 10,000 metres marathon

Nikki Chapple (born 1981) is an Australian long-distance runner who has won events in the 10,000 metres and marathon.

On 12 December 2013 in Melbourne she won the 2013–14 Australian Athletics Championships women's 10,000 metres with a time of 32 minutes 56.22 seconds.

On 12 October 2014 she won the women's event in the Melbourne Marathon with a time of 2 hours 31 minutes and 05 seconds.
