= Rebecca Bennett (sprinter) =

Australian sprinter

Personal information
- Nationality: Australian
- Born: 1 March 1999 (age 27)
- Occupation: 400m sprinter

Rebecca Bennett (born 1 March 1999) is an Australian 400m sprinter.

Bennett is a member of the University of Sydney Athletics Club and is an Elite Athlete scholarship recipient. Bennett claimed a bronze medal in the 400m and a gold medal in the 4x400m relay, while representing Australia at the 2016 IAAF Melanesian Athletics championships in Suva, Fiji.. Bennett was selected to represent Australia in the 2019 IAAF World Relays Championships in Yokohama, Japan. Where she raced as part of the mixed 4x400m relay team, that placed 4th in their heats with a time of 3:03.53.

Bennet earned selection for the 2019 IAAF World Athletics Championships in Doha. She ran as part of the Australian 4x400m Women's relay team and played 5th in their heats, in a time of 3:28.64s.

Bennett has also represented Australia at the World Skipping Championships.

Bennett appeared on the first season of Ultimate Tag.
