= Sara Klein =

Australian hurdler (born 1994)

Personal information
- Nationality: Australian
- Born: 19 May 1994 (age 31)

Sport
- Sport: Athletics
- Event: Hurdles

Sara Klein (born 19 May 1994) is an Australian athlete. She competed in the women's 400 metres hurdles event at the 2019 World Athletics Championships.
