= Selma Kajan =

Australian athlete (born 1991)

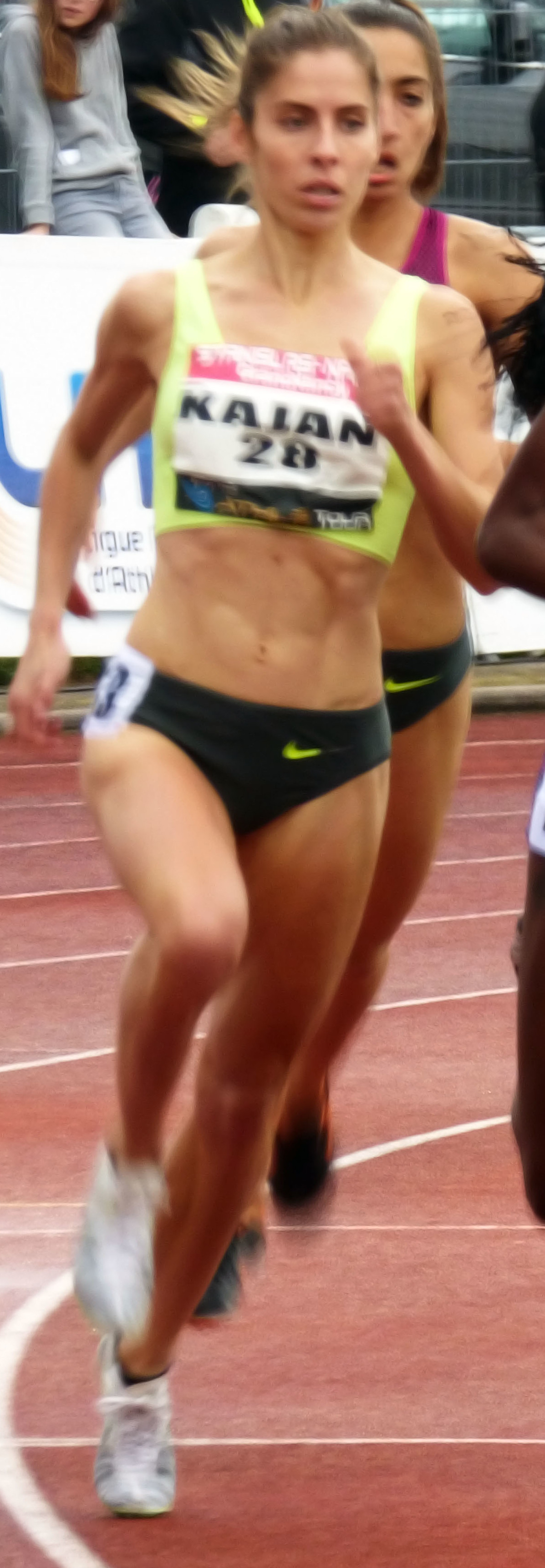

Personal information
- Nationality: Australian
- Born: 30 July 1991 (age 34) Sydney, New South Wales, Australia
- Height: 1.69 m (5 ft 7 in)
- Weight: 52 kg (115 lb)

Sport
- Country: Australia
- Sport: Track and field
- Event: Middle-distance running

Selma Kajan (born 30 July 1991) is an Australian athlete who specialises in middle-distance running. She qualified for the 2016 Summer Olympics. Kajan has competed at the IAAF World Youth Championships. In 2012, she graduated from University of New South Wales. She is of Bosnian descent.

== Personal bests ==
=== Outdoor ===
Event	Record	Venue	Date
800 metres	2:01.27	Barcelona	30 June 2016
1000 metres	2:40.74	Amsterdam	22 August 2014
1500 metres	4:13.16	Lapinlahti	20 July 2014
3000 metres	9:43.04	Sydney	10 November 2007
