= Jeffrey Riseley =

Australian middle-distance runner (born 1986)

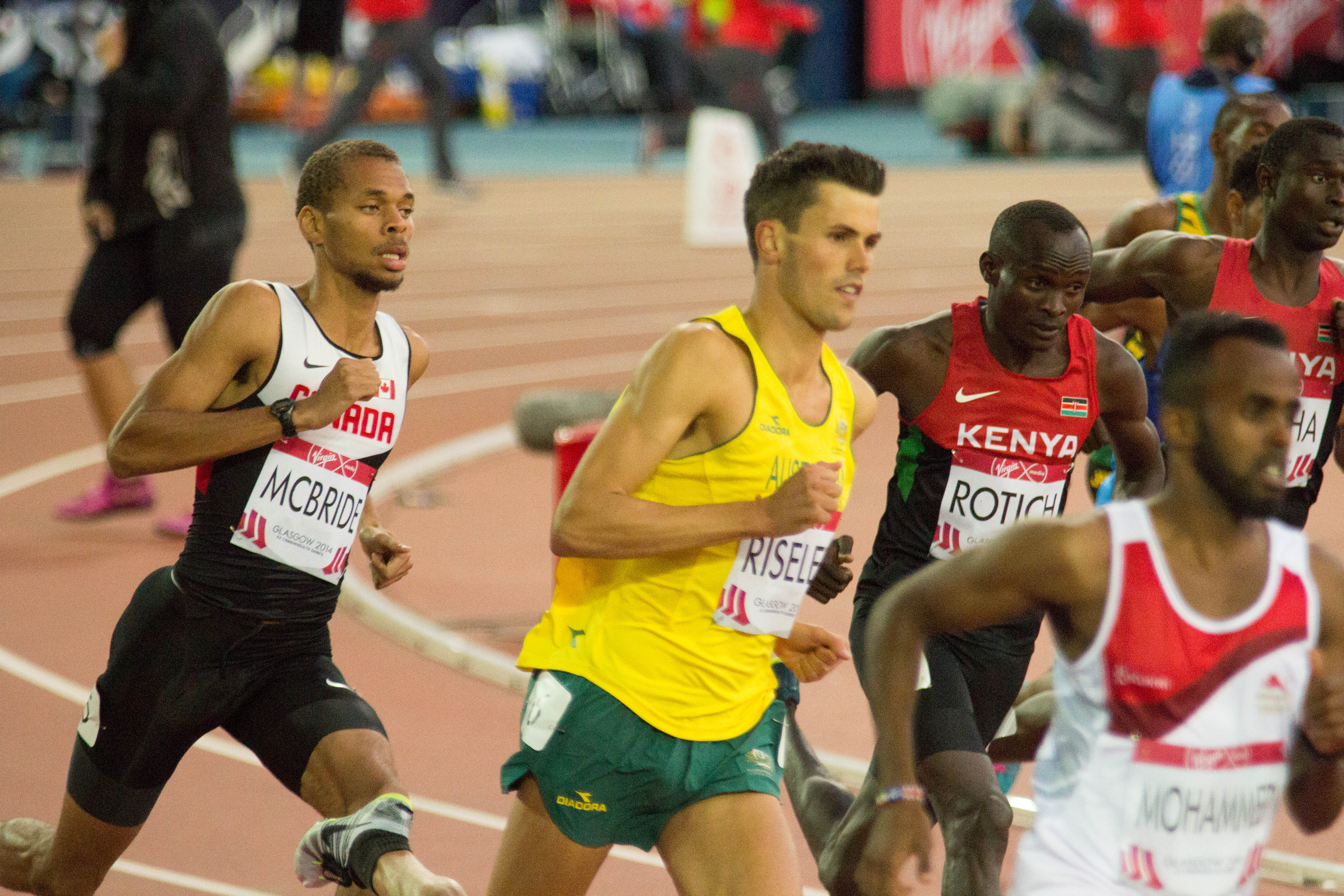
- Riseley (in yellow jersey) at the 2014 Commonwealth Games

Personal information
- Nationality: Australian
- Born: 11 November 1986 (age 39) Dandenong, Australia

Sport
- Sport: Track
- Events: 800 metres and 1500 metres

Achievements and titles
- Personal bests: 400 m: 48.26 (2007); 800 m:: 1:44.48 (2012); 1000 m: 2:16.09 (2014); 1500 m:: 3:32.93 (2009); Mile: 3:51.25 (2009)

Jeffrey "Jeff" Riseley (born 11 November 1986) is an Australian middle-distance athlete. Riseley competed in the 2008, 2012, 2016 and 2020 Summer Olympics.

== Early years ==
Riseley was born on 11 November 1986 in Dandenong. He was seven when he began to participate in athletics. His family encouraged him as it would enable him to meet other children after the family had moved house. Riseley joined the under 8's at Dandenong Little Athletics and competed until he was 12. He lost interest but then returned to athletics in Year 11 in High School.

Just before he turned 19, Riseley ran 1:52.7 for the 800m and in 2006 he clocked times of 1:49.0 for 800m and 3:48.91 for 1500m. Within 12 months, he ran times of 1:46.35 (800m) and 3:38.56 (1500m). Riseley's first major competition was the 2007 World Championships in Athletics, competing in the Men's 800 metres and finishing in 40th place with a time of 1:48.33. In the same year he also competed at the Summer Universiade competition.

== Achievements ==
Riseley competed at the 2009, 2011 and 2015 World championships. He won the 2009 Australian title, his first national title, in Brisbane. One of his finest achievements was running fifth in both the 800m and 1500m in the 2014 Commonwealth Games in Glasgow. Riseley won six 800m or 1500m national titles including the double in 2015, the first to achieve the double in 24 years.

Riseley had to withdraw from the 2015 Beijing World Championships due to requiring double plantar fascia surgery. He then returned to good form in Europe with two 1:45 runs, just outside the Olympic standard, then on 20 June 2020 he managed to run the 800m in 1:44.85, his fastest time for nine years.

In his Men's 800m heat at the 2020 Tokyo Olympics, Riseley came fourth with a time of 1:45.41 and qualified for the semi-final, where he came fifth and did not progress to the final.

Off the track, Riseley has a double degree in exercise sports science and sports management at Deakin University and as of 2021, he is studying a Masters in high performance sport at Australian Catholic University (ACU).

== Competition record ==
Year	Competition	Venue	Position	Event	Notes
Representing Australia
2007	Universiade	Bangkok, Thailand	9th (sf)	800 m	1:48.33
2007	World Championships	Osaka, Japan	40th (h)	800 m	1:47.44
2008	Olympic Games	Beijing, China	47th (h)	1500 m	3:53.95
2009	World Championships	Berlin, Germany	18th (sf)	1500 m	3:38.00
2011	World Championships	Daegu, South Korea	28th (h)	1500 m	3:42.22
2012	Olympic Games	London, United Kingdom	23rd (h)	800 m	1:46.99
2014	Commonwealth Games	Glasgow, United Kingdom	5th	800 m	1:46.12
2014	Commonwealth Games	Glasgow, United Kingdom	5th	1500 m	3:40.27
2014	Continental Cup	Marrakesh, Morocco	5th	800 m	1:46.20
2015	World Championships	Beijing, China	(sf inj)	800 m	1:46.79 (h)
2016	Olympic Games	Rio de Janeiro, Brazil	21st (h)	800 m	1:46.93
2021	Olympic Games	Tokyo, Japan	21st (sf)	800 m	1:47.17
