= Joseph Millar (sprinter) =

New Zealand sprinter (born 1992)

Personal information
- Born: 24 September 1992 (age 33) Whakatāne, New Zealand
- Home town: Tauranga, New Zealand
- Height: 183 cm (6 ft 0 in) (2018)
- Weight: 76 kg (168 lb) (2018)

Sport
- Sport: Sprinting
- Events: 100 metres, 200 metres
- Club: Athletics Tauranga Inc
- Coached by: Gary Henley-Smith

Joseph Millar (born 24 September 1992) is a New Zealand sprinter.

Millar is the holder of the New Zealand 200 metre record, in a time of 20.37 seconds (+0.1 m/s), as well as the New Zealand residents record in the 100 metres, with 10.18 seconds (+0.5 m/s). Millar is coached by Gary Henley-Smith, who also coaches Eddie Osei-Nketia. He was previously coached by Mike Corboy, Todd Blythe, Paul Gamble. Millar has a 400 metre best of 46.99.

== National championships ==
Millar has won the 100m-200m sprint double at the New Zealand National Championships five times, in 2011 - 2014 and 2017 - 2018. In 2017 he ran his current personal bests of 10.18 and 20.37. His 100m time is the fastest ever run by a New Zealander in New Zealand and ranks him the third fastest ever in New Zealand. His 200m time broke Chris Donaldson's 20-year New Zealand record in the event and qualified him for the 2017 World Athletics Championships. Millar also won the sprint double at the 2017 Australian Track and Field Champs.

== International events ==
Millar competed in the men's 100 metres at the 2017 World Championships in Athletics. He finished 33rd overall in the 100m and 39th overall in the 200m. At the 2018 Commonwealth Games he reached the semi-finals placing sixth in his semi-final heat, running 21.01, but did not qualify for the final.
