= Luke Cann =

Australian javelin thrower

Personal information
- Born: 17 July 1994 (age 31) Frankston, Victoria, Australia
- Education: Deakin University
- Height: 1.83 m (6 ft 0 in)
- Weight: 101 kg (223 lb)

Sport
- Sport: Athletics
- Event: Javelin throw
- Coached by: Grant Ward

Luke Cann (born 17 July 1994) is an Australian athlete specialising in the javelin throw. He represented his country at the 2014 and 2018 Commonwealth Games.

His personal best in the event is 81.07 metres set in Townsville in 2017.

== International competitions ==
Year	Competition	Venue	Position	Event	Notes
Representing Australia
2010	Oceania Youth Championships	Sydney, Australia	3rd	Javelin throw (700 g)	66.98 m
2011	Commonwealth Youth Games	Douglas, Isle of Man	2nd	Javelin throw (700 g)	75.21 m
2012	World Junior Championships	Barcelona, Spain	7th	Javelin throw	70.15 m
2014	Commonwealth Games	Glasgow, United Kingdom	7th	Javelin throw	75.93 m
2018	Commonwealth Games	Gold Coast, Australia	6th	Javelin throw	76.99 m

== Season bests ==
- 2010 – 65.24
- 2012 – 74.54
- 2013 – 76.58
- 2014 – 79.36
- 2015 – 68.40
- 2016 – 79.26
- 2017 – 81.07
- 2018 – 77.43
