= Henry Smith (long jumper) =

Australian long jumper

Personal information
- Born: 9 April 1996 (age 29)

Sport
- Country: Australia
- Sport: Track and field
- Event: Long jump

Henry Smith (born 9 April 1996) is an Australian long jumper. In 2019, he competed in the men's long jump at the 2019 World Athletics Championships held in Doha, Qatar. He did not qualify to compete in the final.
