= Kimberley Mulhall =

Australian discus thrower and shot putter

Personal information
- Born: 9 January 1991 (age 35) Bentleigh East, Melbourne, Australia
- Height: 1.76 m (5 ft 9 in)
- Weight: 78 kg (172 lb)

Sport
- Country: Australia
- Sport: Track and field
Medal record
Track and field
Representing Australia
Oceanian Athletics Championships
Gold medal – first place	2019 Townsville	Women's discus throw

Kimberley "Kim" Mulhall (born 9 January 1991) is an Australian discus thrower and former shot putter who competes in international elite events. She is an Oceanian champion in the discus throw and has competed at the Commonwealth Games twice.
