= Tanya Holliday =

Australian athlete

Personal information
- Born: 21 September 1988 (age 37)

Sport
- Sport: Track and field
- Event: 20 kilometres race walk

Tanya Holliday (born 21 September 1988) is an Australian race walker. She competed in the women's 20 kilometres walk event at the 2016 Summer Olympics. In 2016, she finished in 15th place in the women's 20 km walk at the 2016 IAAF World Race Walking Team Championships held in Rome, Italy.
