= Kiara Reddingius =

Australian bobsledder (born 1992)

Personal information
- Nationality: Australian
- Born: 2 January 1992 (age 34) Leonora, Western Australia

Sport
- Sport: Bobsleigh

Kiara Reddingius (born 2 January 1992) is an Australian bobsledder. During the 2022 Winter Olympics in Beijing, she competed in the two-woman bobsleigh event alongside Bree Walker, placing 16th overall. Reddingius originally took part in track and field events before shifting her focus to winter sports.

Reddingius was born in Leonora, Western Australia. She attended John Paul College in Kalgoorlie for her secondary schooling, graduating in 2009.
