= Bendere Oboya =

Australian sprinter

Personal information
- Nationality: Australian
- Born: 17 April 2000 (age 25) Gambela, Ethiopia

Sport
- Country: Australia
- Sport: Track and field
- Event(s): 400 metres; 800 metres

Bendere Opamo Oboya (born 17 April 2000) is an Australian athlete. She competed in the women's 400 metres event at the 2019 World Athletics Championships. At the 2020 Tokyo Olympics, Oboya competed in both the women's 400 meters and was a member of the Australian team that competed in the women's 4 x 400 meter relay. She came fifth in her individual event in her heat and was eliminated. As a member of the team of Ellie Beer, Kendra Hubbard and Annaliese Rubie-Renshaw they finished 7th in their heat and did not contest the final.

== Early life ==
Oboya arrived in Australia in 2003 aged three with her family including five siblings. She participated in athletics when only very young at Blacktown Little Athletics. When she was 16 years old she went on a school athletics trip to Canada. This encouraged her to take her athletics career more seriously, found a coach and started training. She has stated that she enjoyed her childhood growing up in Pendle Hill, New South Wales, in Sydney's west.

== Athletics career ==
Her talent was already visible at school when she quickly rose up the ranks. At the 2017 Commonwealth Youth Games, she won the gold medal at 400 metres. At the 2019 World Athletics Championships – 400 metres, she reached the semi-finals.

She nearly quit the sport due to mental health issues after a tumultuous 2019 and a bitter split from her former coach. John Quinn, who is a well-respected sprints coach, became her mentor. Quinn stated that Bendere Oboya is a role model because of her humility. She has twice been Australia’s women's 400 metres champion (2019, 2021) and was the Oceania Champion in the 400m in 2019. She was Australia’s only sprinter to have run a qualifying time for the Tokyo Olympics.

In Canberra in March 2024, Oboya ran a personal best of 1:59.01 for the 800 metres. She finished third in a very competitive field in the 800m at the 2024 Australian Championships in a time of 1.59.33.
