= Nik Bojic =

Australian high jumper

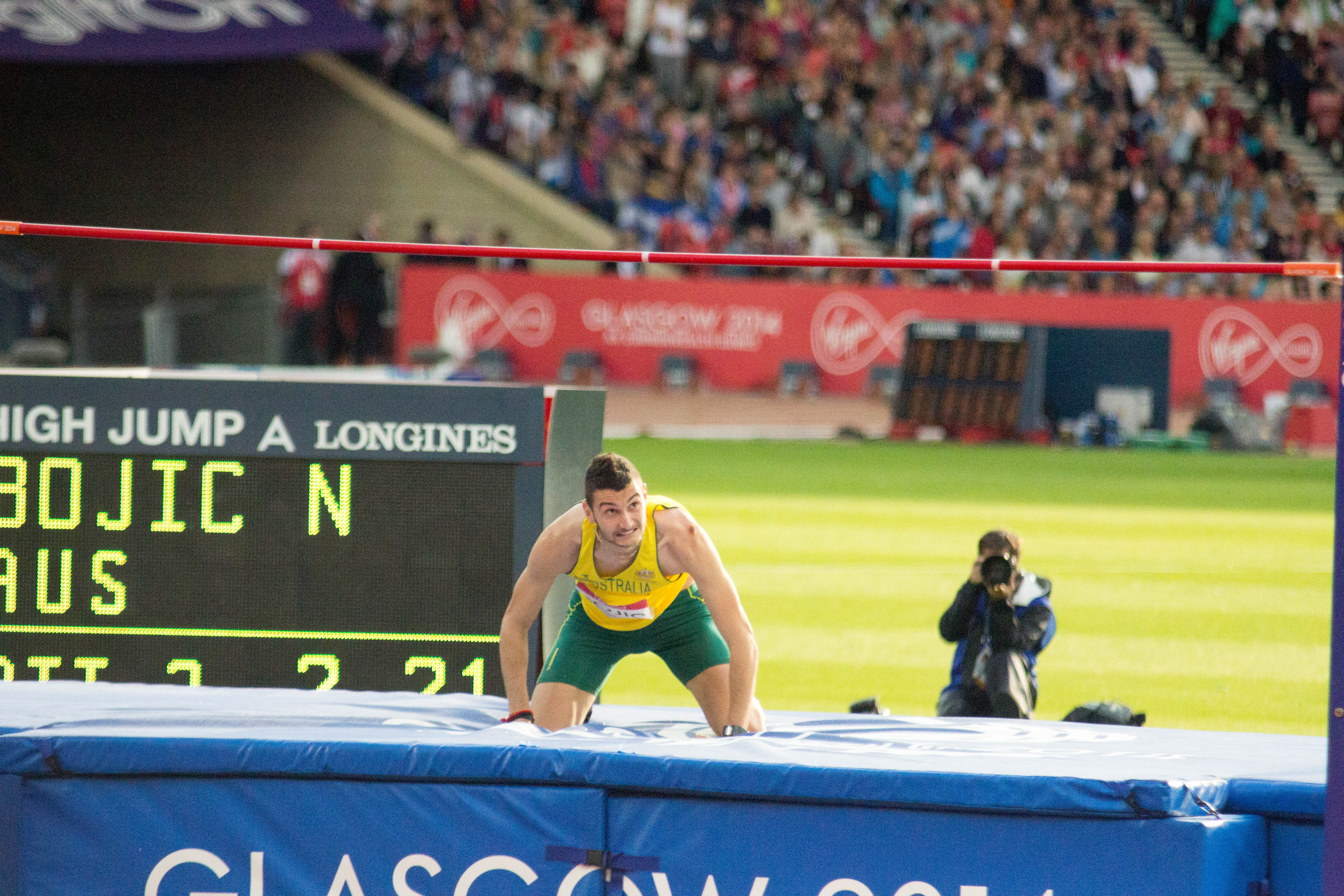
Nik Bojic at the 2014 Commonwealth Games

Nik Bojic (born 18 January 1992) is an Australian high jumper.

Bojic is of Serbian descent and migrated to Australia as a three year old. He grew up in Brisbane, Queensland and completed his secondary education at Brisbane State High School. He is currently a student at University of Queensland.

In 2013, Bojic qualified for the Summer Universiade in Kazan, Russia when he finished 3rd with a jump of 2.22m at the Australian National Championships. In Kazan he placed 4th in the men's high jump final, improving his personal best by 6 cm to clear 2.28m. Defeating the Olympic champion Ivan Ukhov in the process. This jump places him the equal 7th highest Australian jump of all time.

Bojic won the 2014 Australian National Championships with a jump of 2.23m and subsequently qualified for the Commonwealth Games. At the 2014 Commonwealth Games in Glasgow he made the final with a jump of 2.20m finishing top of group B with first attempt clearance at all of the heights. He later went on to clear 2.21m in the final.
