= Alexander Rowe (runner) =

Australian middle-distance runner

Personal information
- Nickname: Rowey
- Nationality: Australian
- Born: 8 July 1992 Melbourne

Sport
- Country: Australia
- Sport: Athletics
- Event: 800 M
- Club: St Kevins Amateur Athletic Club

Achievements and titles
- Personal bests: 400 M: 48.10 s (2012); 800 M: 1:44.40 (2014); 1500 M: 3:46.16 (2014)

Alexander Rowe (born 8 July 1992) is an Australian track and field athlete specialising in the 800 meters who has competed in the World Championships.

== Records and rankings ==
Rowe is a one-time gold medalist and a two-time silver medalist in the 800 metres in the Australian National Track & Field Championships. He is also a two-time gold medalist and a one-time silver medalist in the Australian Junior National Track & Field Championships also in the 800 metres. He shares the best Australian time in the 800 meters with Ralph Doubell.

== Competitions ==
=== Youth World Championships ===
Rowe has competed in one World Youth Championships (2009). He competed in the 800 meters and made the final and finished 5th in a time of 1:52.13.

=== Senior World Championships ===
Rowe was selected to compete in the 2013 World Championships in Moscow in the 800 meters. He finished 5th in heat six in a time of 1:45.92. His performance qualified him for the semi-final and he competed in semi-final one. He finished 6th and did not qualify him for the final. This was the end of Rowe's competition, however his time of 1:45.80 saw him finish 13th overall in the competition. This was the best result for an Australian in the 800m at a World Championships in its history.

In 2014 Rowe was selected to compete in the Glasgow Commonwealth Games, however he never made it to the track, being forced out with a hamstring strain just days before competition.

== Statistics ==
=== Personal bests ===
Event	Performance	Venue	Date
400 M	47.41 s	Melbourne, Australia	7 March 2015
800 M	1:44.40	Monaco	18 July 2014
1500 M	3:44.6	Melbourne, Australia	30 October 2016

=== Progression ===
Year	400 M	800 M	1500 M
2008	–	1:50.63	-
2009	-	1:49.64	-
2010	-	1:47.56	-
2011	-	1:46.28	3:46.6
2012	48.10 s	1:47.55	-
2013	-	1:45.44	3:46.20
2014	48.13 s	1:44:40	3:46.16

== Achievements ==
Year	Competition	Venue	Position	Event	Notes
Representing Australia
2009	World Youth Championships	Bressanone, Italy	5th	800 meters	1:52.13
2013	World Championships	Moscow, Russia	13th (sf)	800 meters	1:45.80
