= Chelsea Jaensch =

Australian long jumper

Personal information
- Born: 6 January 1985 (age 41) Adelaide, Australia

Sport
- Sport: Athletics
- Event: Long jump
- Club: QE2 Track Club
- Coached by: Gary Bourne

Chelsea Jaensch (born 6 January 1985 in Adelaide) is an Australian athlete specialising in the long jump. She made her major competition debut at the age of thirty-one at the 2016 World Indoor Championships finishing eleventh. She returned to competition in 2012 after a seven-year break to focus on education and playing netball. She represented her country at the 2016 Summer Olympics in Rio de Janeiro finishing 17th and not qualifying for the final.

Her personal bests in the event are 6.70 metres outdoors (-0.1 m/s, Canberra 2016) and 6.38 metres indoors (Portland 2016). Chelsea is as well a full-time radiographer.

== Competition record ==
Year	Competition	Venue	Position	Event	Notes
Representing Australia
2016	World Indoor Championships	Portland, United States	11th	Long jump	6.38 m
2016	Olympic Games	Rio de Janeiro, Brazil	17th (q)	Long jump	6.41 m
