= James Nipperess =

Australian athlete

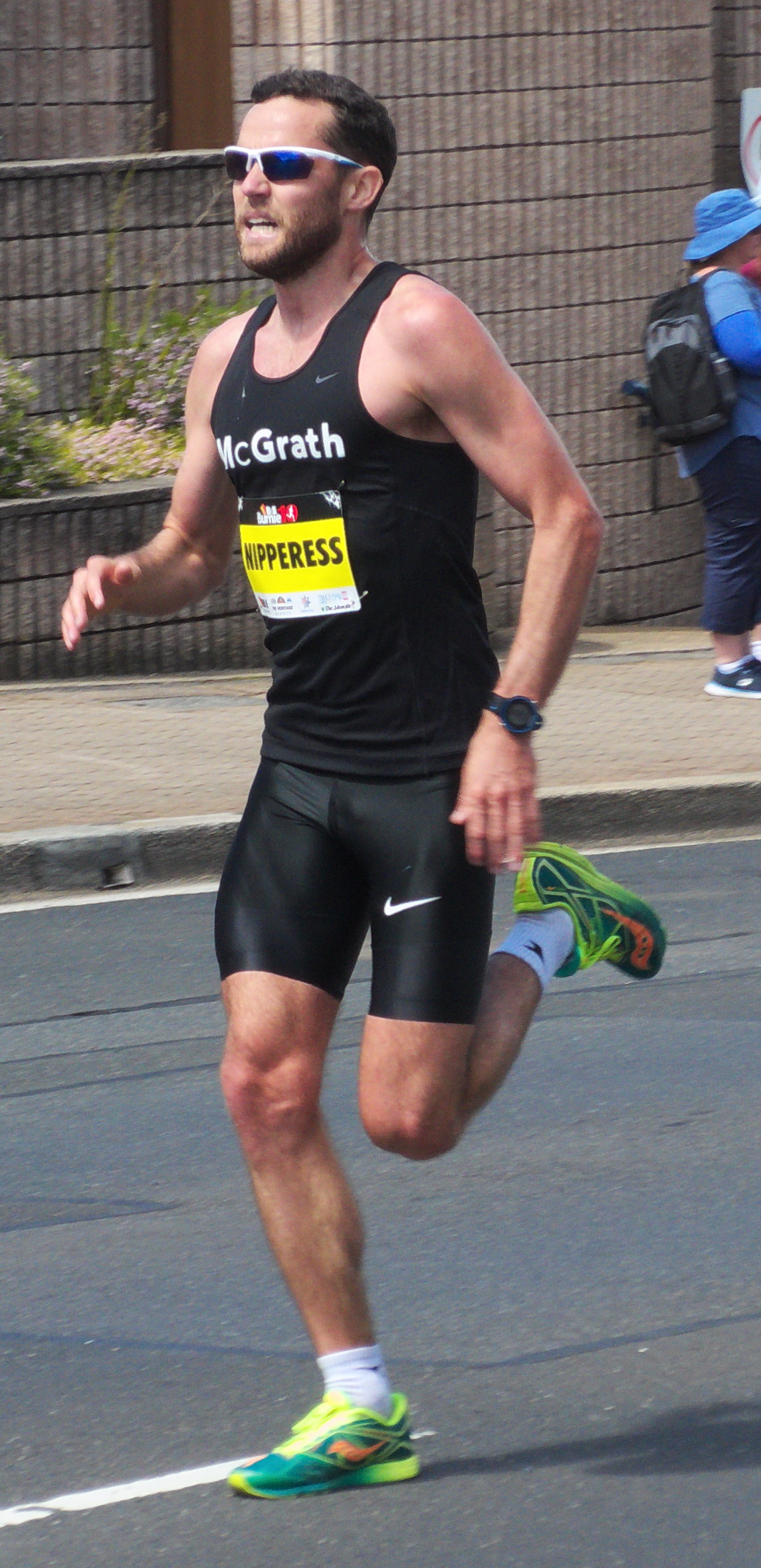
- Nipperess finishing 3rd in the 2017 Burnie Ten

Personal information
- Full name: James Ian Nipperess
- Born: 21 May 1990 (age 36) Penshurst, Sydney
- Education: University of Sydney

Sport
- Sport: Athletics
- Event: 3000 m steeplechase
- Club: Sydney University Athletics Club
- Coached by: Ken Green; Albie Thomas (–2008) Dick Telford

James Nipperess (born 21 May 1990) is an Australian long distance runner who specialized in the steeplechase. He won 6 Australian titles in the 3000m steeplechase, and also won an Australian Cross Country Championship. He competed at the 2015 World Championships in Beijing and World Cross Country Championships in Guiyang.

== Competition record ==
| Year | Competition | Venue | Position | Event | Notes |
Representing Australia
| 2011 | Universiade | Shenzhen, China | 8th (h) | 1500 m | 3:47.24 |
| 2013 | Universiade | Kazan, Russia | 12th | 3000 m s'chase | 9:17.10 |
| 2014 | Commonwealth Games | Glasgow, United Kingdom | 9th | 3000 m s'chase | 9:16.76 |
| 2015 | World Championships | Beijing, China | 33rd (h) | 3000 m s'chase | 8:56.01 |
| 2018 | Commonwealth Games | Gold Coast, Australia | 9th | 3000 m s'chase | 8:58.16 |

== Personal bests ==
Outdoor

- 800 metres – 1:49.61 (Sydney 2009)
- 1500 metres – 3:41.01 (Melbourne 2009)
- 3000 metres – 7:55.79 (Sydney 2020)
- 5000 metres – 13:56.55 (Hobart 2009)
- 3000 metres steeplechase – 8:30.13 (Sydney 2021)
