= Genevieve Gregson =

Australian athletics competitor

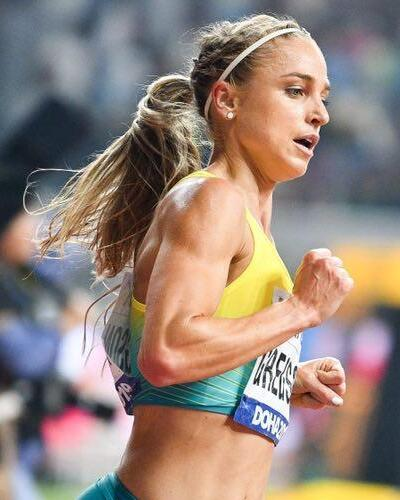
- Gregson in 2019

Personal information
- Nickname: Greg
- National team: Australia
- Born: 4 August 1989 (age 37) Gold Coast, Queensland, Australia
- Education: University of Florida
- Height: 1.68 m (5 ft 6 in)
- Weight: 54 kg (119 lb) (2018)

Sport
- Sport: Athletics
- Events: 3000 metres steeplechase 1500 metres Marathon
- College team: Florida Gators
- Coached by: Nic Bideau

Achievements and titles
- Olympic finals: 2021 Tokyo; 3,000 m, steeplechase, DNF; 2024 Paris; Marathon, 24th
- Personal bests: Track; 2000 m steeplechase: 6:09:48 (Berlin 2016); 3000 m steeplechase: 9:14:28 AR (Paris 2016); Road; Marathon: 2:23:08 (Valencia 2023)

Genevieve Gregson (née LaCaze; born 4 August 1989) is an Australian athletics competitor who specialized in the 3000 metre steeplechase but for the 2024 Olympics qualified for and ran for Australia in the marathon. She qualified for the 2020 Tokyo Olympics held in 2021 and ran 9:26.11 in her Women's 3000m steeplechase heat to qualify for the final. She fell, rupturing her Achilles tendon, and was unable to complete the race.

She is the AR and National record holder in the event with a PB of 9.14.28. She held an athletics scholarship at the University of Florida. She was selected to represent Australia at the 2012 Summer Olympics in London and Athletics at the 2016 Summer Olympics in Rio de Janeiro.

== Early and personal life ==
Genevieve LaCaze-Gregson, whose nickname is Greg, spent her childhood in Brisbane, where she attended Tamborine Mountain State School before going to high school at the John Paul College in Daisy Hill. She is from Queensland. She attended the University of Florida, where she majored in Social and Behavioral Sciences from 2009 to 2012. As of 2012, she lives in the United States.

As of 2012, LaCaze-Gregson is 164 centimetres (65 in) tall and weighs 53 kilograms (117 lb).

== Athletics ==
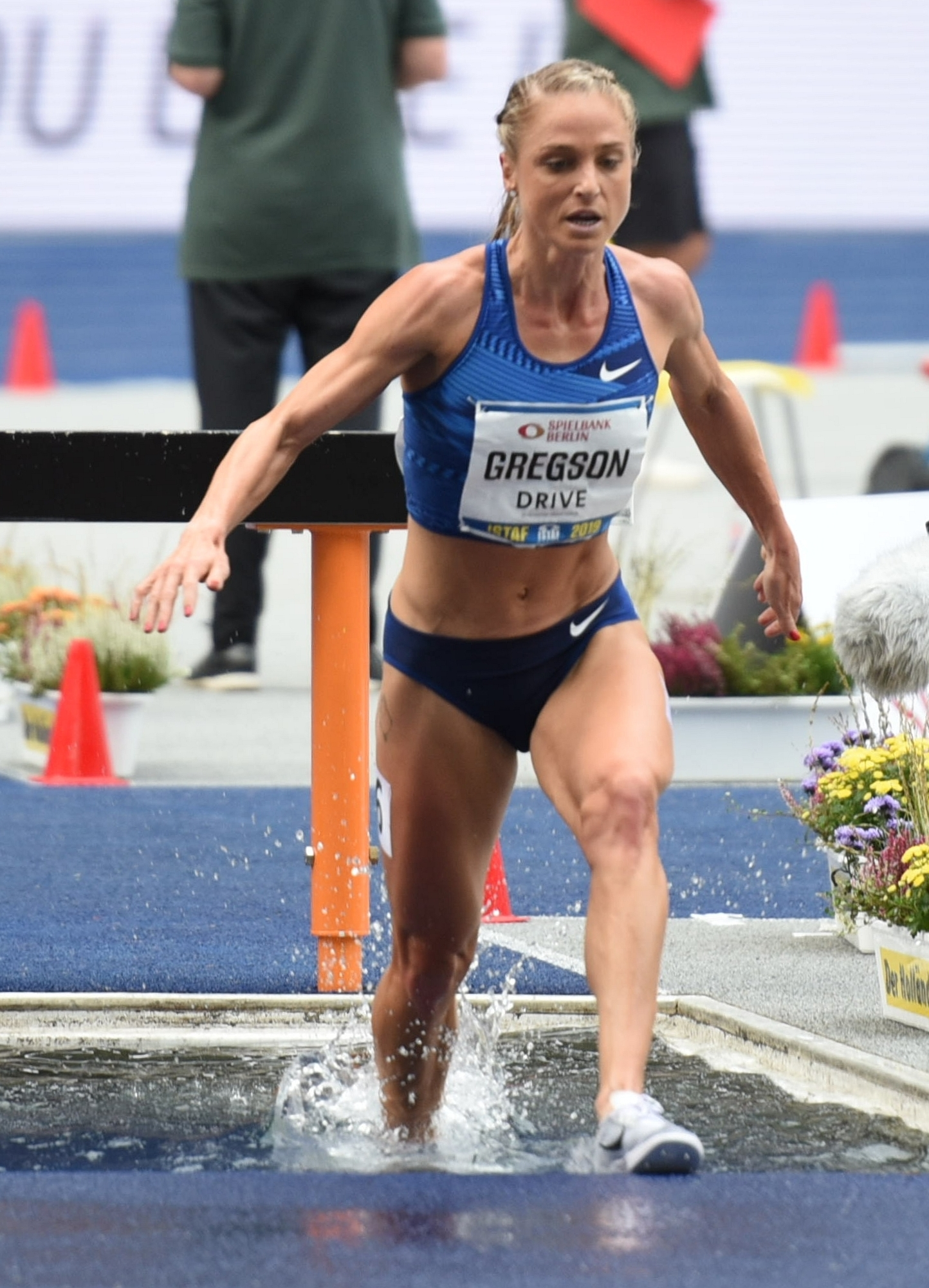
Gregson in 2019

LaCaze competes in the 3000 metres steeplechase event and the 1500 metres. She started running when she was nine years old. In the United States, she is coached by Paul Spangler. In Australia, she was coached by David Howells. She has also been coached by Todd Morgan. As of 2018, she was coached by Nic Bideau.

LaCaze finished second in the 2012 Melbourne Track Classic in the 3000 metres steeple chase. LaCaze finished first at the 2012 Indianapolis American Milers Club in the 3000 metres steeple chase and first in the 1500 metres race.

=== University ===
LaCaze accepted an athletics scholarship to attend the University of Florida in Gainesville, Florida, to study Applied physiology and kinesiology. At the University of Florida she competed for the Florida Gators cross country and Florida Gators track and field teams in National Collegiate Athletic Association (NCAA) competition from 2009 to 2012. She competed in the university-hosted Mountain Dew Invitational held at the Mark Bostick Golf Course in Gainesville. She finished fifth at the 2011 NCAA Division I Track and Field Championships in the 3000 metres steeple chase, and second in the 2012 NCAA Division I Track and Field Championships in the same event, both held in Des Moines, Iowa.

=== 2012 London Olympics ===
LaCaze set an Olympic A-Qualifying time of 9:41, two days after the deadline set by Athletics Australia. She set the time at a race in Indianapolis. She claimed her inability to set an Olympic A-Qualifying time earlier was a result of the university athletics schedule making it difficult to set a qualifying time. After news of her too-late qualification time broke, she became a trending topic on Twitter under the hashtags #letlacazerun and #genlacaze as people indicated their support for her to represent Australia at the 2012 Summer Olympics. Following the story, she was contacted by Nike and New Balance about potential sponsorship. No other Australian athlete had qualified for the 3000m distance.

LaCaze was eventually chosen to represent Australia at the 2012 Summer Olympics after having initially been left off the squad. Australian Olympic Committee President John Coates intervened asking Athletics Australia to include her on the squad. Prior to Coates' support, Athletics Australia high performance manager Eric Hollingsworth had said that LaCaze did not deserve to go because she had not complied with Athletics Australia's nomination deadline.

LaCaze was Australia's only female runner in the 3000 metre steeplechase event as no other Australian woman set an Olympic A-Qualifying time. The Games was her first. Her family planned to travel to London to watch her compete. She did not qualify for the final but improved her personal best up to 9:37:90.

=== Commonwealth Games 2014 ===
LaCaze had a disappointing 2013 after breaking her ankle at the Birmingham Diamond League event in the buildup to the Moscow World Championships, for which she had qualified. This injury made LaCaze call time on life in Florida where she had carried on living and training since graduating college in 2012 after the Olympics. LaCaze returned home and based herself in Melbourne training with Melbourne Track Club giving her the opportunity to train with Australia's best distance athletes and coach Nic Bideau. Since moving to Melbourne LaCaze has begun a relationship with fellow distance runner Ryan Gregson, whom she first met in 2007 under rather amusing circumstances.

LaCaze recovered well and set a qualifying time for the Glasgow 2014 Commonwealth games. At the games LaCaze raced well in a lead group of five, but succumbed to the last lap pace and finished 5th in a personal best time of 9:37:04.

During the closing ceremony of the Glasgow 2014 Commonwealth Games, LaCaze got on stage during Kylie Minogue's performance of 'The Loco-Motion'.

=== 2016 Rio Olympics ===
LaCaze placed ninth in the final of the women's 3000 metres steeplechase in a personal best time of 9:21.21. She also finished in twelfth in the 1500 m race.

She finished 12th in the 3000 m steeplechase at the 2017 World Championships, despite an injury-ravaged build up to the event. Because of injuries, she raced only once before the World Championships.

=== Commonwealth Games 2018 ===
LaCaze finished in 5th place at the 2018 Commonwealth Games in her home region of the Gold Coast, Australia.

=== Melbourne Marathon 2024 ===
She won the 2024 Melbourne Marathon.
