= Paige Campbell =

Australian athlete

Personal information
- Nationality: Australian
- Born: 27 June 1996 (age 30)

Sport
- Sport: Athletics
- Event: Steeplechase

Paige Campbell (born 27 June 1996) is an Australian athlete. She competed in the senior women's race at the 2019 IAAF World Cross Country Championships held in Aarhus, Denmark. She finished in 29th place. She also competed in the women's 3000 metres steeplechase event at the 2019 World Athletics Championships held in Doha, Qatar.
