= Brianna Beahan =

Australian track and field athlete

Personal information
- Nationality: Australian
- Born: 1 November 1991 (age 34) Joondalup, Perth, Western Australia

Sport
- Sport: Athletics
- Event: 100 metres hurdles
Medal record
Representing Australia
Women's athletics
Oceania Area Championships in Athletics
Gold medal – first place	2019 Townsville	100 m hurdles

Brianna Beahan (born 1 November 1991) is an Australian track and field athlete who specializes in the 100 metres hurdles. She won a gold medal in 100 metres hurdles at the 2019 Oceania Athletics Championships in Townsville. Representing Australia at the 2019 World Athletics Championships, she reached the semi-finals in women's 100 metres hurdles.

== Personal life ==
Beahan was born in Joondalup, and is educated at the Edith Cowan University in Perth, Western Australia.
