= Madeline Heiner =

Australian runner (born 1987)

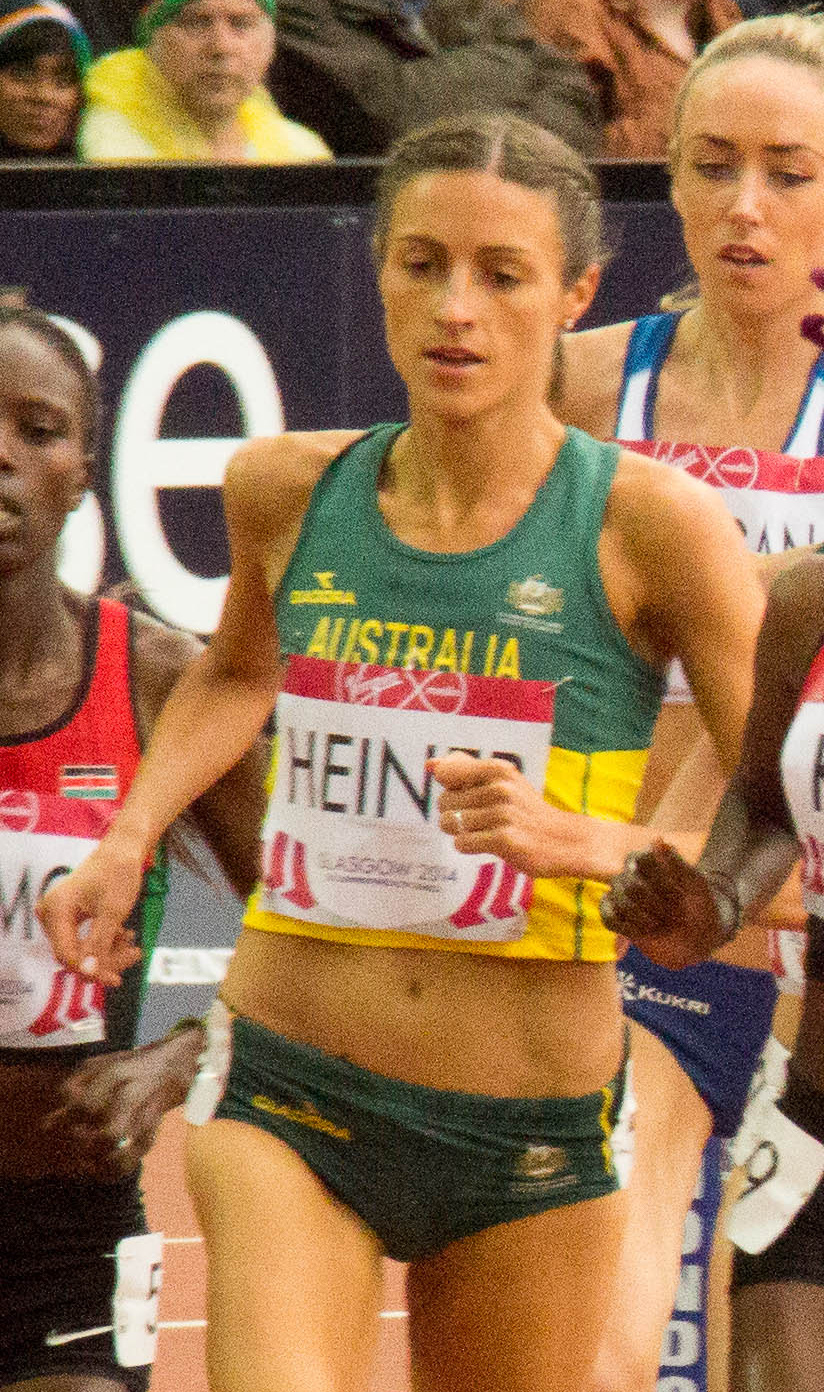
- Heiner at the 2014 Commonwealth Games

Personal information
- Born: 15 May 1987 (age 39) Shellharbour, New South Wales, Australia
- Height: 1.74 m (5 ft 8 1/2 in)
- Weight: 53 kg (117 lb)

Sport
- Country: Australia
- Sport: Track and field
- Events: 1500–10,000 m, steeplechase

Achievements and titles
- Personal bests: 1500 m – 4:06.47 (2016); 3000 m – 8:44.20 (2015); 3000 mS – 9:20.38 (2016); 5000 m – 15:04.05 (2016); 10,000 m – 31:41.10 (2017)

Madeline Heiner (born 15 May 1987) is an Australian runner. She placed fourth in the women's 3000 metres steeplechase at the 2014 Commonwealth Games. At the 2016 Rio Olympics, she placed 7th in the 3000m steeplechase final and 10th in the 5000m final. She also represented Australia in the 2015 IAAF World Championships (3000m steeplechase, 5000m), 2017 IAAF World Championships (5000m, 10,000m) and the 2018 Commonwealth Games (5000m, 10000m).

== Biography ==
Heiner was born in Shellharbour, New South Wales on 15 May 1987. She took up running seriously in 2002; as a 17-year-old, she represented Australia in the 1500 metres at the 2004 World Junior Championships in Grosseto, but was eliminated in the heats. At the Commonwealth Youth Games in December 2004 she won gold in the 3000 metres and bronze in the 1500 metres. In 2005, she was Australian under-20 cross-country champion and placed 16th in the junior race at the World Cross Country Championships in Saint-Galmier. She competed in the World Cross Country Championships again in 2006, this time placing 18th in the junior race, but missed the IAAF World Junior Championships later that year due to an injury. She studied pharmacy and did not return to the track after recovering from the injury.

In the summer of 2013, actively working as a pharmacist while also continuing her studies, Heiner decided to resume running. She joined the training group of coach Adam Didyk; her first race back was in January 2014, after a hiatus of almost eight years. Her times improved rapidly, and she met her initial goal of qualifying for the 2014 Commonwealth Games in Glasgow; she represented Australia in the 3000 metres steeplechase, placing fourth in a personal best 9:34.01. Encouraged by the good results, Heiner continued her comeback with an eye on the 2015 World Championships in Beijing and the 2016 Summer Olympics in Rio de Janeiro. She became Australian senior champion for the first time in 2015, winning the 5000 metres title; the race was held at the Sydney Track Classic rather than as part of the main championship meet, and Heiner placed second behind Kenya's Magdalene Masai but was the top Australian in 15:21.09. She was briefly the 2015 world leader in the 3000 m steeplechase after winning at the Melbourne Track Classic in a personal best 9:31.03. She improved her times further at the Diamond League meetings in Doha (6th in 9:28.41) and Rome (5th in 9:21.56); the latter time ranked her second behind Donna MacFarlane on the Australian all-time list.

Heiner was selected for the 2015 World Championships in both the steeplechase and the 5000 metres.

Heiner was selected for the 2016 Summer Olympics in both the 3000 m steeplechase and the 5000 metres. She placed seventh in the steeplechase final with a personal best of 9:20:38 and tenth in the 5000m final with a personal best of 15:04.05.

In 2017, Heiner moved away from the steeplechase towards the 10,000m. She ran 31.41 to qualify for the IAAF World Championships (London), where she represented Australia in both the 5000m and 10,000m.

In 2018, despite struggling with injury, Heiner was selected for her second Commonwealth Games, this time in the 5000m and 10,000m.

Her long lasted hamstring injury required surgery, and was finally operated in March 2019 by Finnish surgeons Lasse Lempainen and Sakari Orava, in Turku, Finland.

Madeline retired from competition in 2020, returning her focus to her pharmacy career. After first spending three years as the senior custodial pharmacist for St Vincent's hospital, she now leads the Victorian Poisons Information Centre.
