= Heidi See =

Australian athlete

Personal information
- Born: 9 August 1989 (age 36) Sydney, Australia
- Education: Iona College

Sport
- Sport: Athletics
- Event: 1500 metres
- College team: Iona Gaels

Heidi See (née Gregson; born 9 August 1989) is an Australian middle-distance runner. She competed in the 1500 metres at the 2015 World Championships in Beijing without advancing from the first round. In September 2014, she married an American runner, Jeff See.

== International competitions ==
Year	Competition	Venue	Position	Event	Notes
Representing Australia
2005	World Youth Championships	Marrakesh, Morocco	7th	1500 m	4:30.55
2015	IAAF World Relays	Nassau, Bahamas	4th	Distance medley relay	10:46.94
2015	World Championships	Beijing, China	33rd (h)	1500 m	4:20.65
2017	IAAF World Relays	Nassau, Bahamas	3rd	4 × 800 m relay	8:21.08
2017	World Championships	London, United Kingdom	29th (h)	5000 m	15:38.86

== Personal bests ==
Outdoor

- 1500 metres – 4:08.15 (Greenville 2015)
- One mile – 4:34.05 (Raleigh 2014)

Indoor

- One mile – 4:33.30 (Winston-Salem 2016)
- 3000 metres – 8:55.20 (Boston 2015)
