= Brittany McGowan =

Australian middle-distance runner

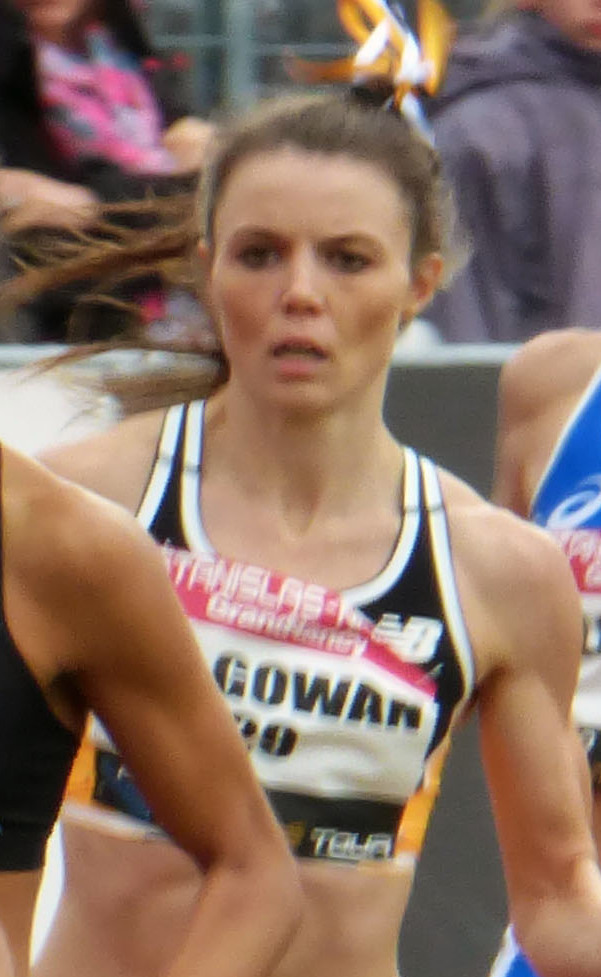
- McGowan in 2016

Personal information
- Nationality: Australian
- Born: 24 April 1991 (age 35)

Sport
- Sport: Middle-distance running
- Event: 800 metres

Brittany McGowan (born 24 April 1991) is an Australian middle-distance runner. She competed in the women's 800 metres at the 2017 World Championships in Athletics.
