= Lara Nielsen =

Australian athlete

Personal information
- Nationality: Australian
- Born: 19 December 1992 (age 33) Toowoomba

Sport
- Sport: Athletics
- Event: Hammer
Medal record
Track and field
Representing Australia
Commonwealth Games
Bronze medal – third place	2018 Gold Coast	Hammer Throw

Lara Nielsen (born 19 December 1992) is an Australian athlete. She competed in the women's hammer throw at the 2018 Commonwealth Games, winning the bronze medal.
