= Ellen Pettitt =

Australian high jumper and triple jumper

Personal information
- Nationality: Australia
- Born: 13 May 1986 (age 40) Perth, Australia

Sport
- Sport: Athletics
Medal record
Women's athletics
Representing Australia
Oceania Championships
Silver medal – second place	2010 Cairns	High jump
- Updated on 24 April 2013

Ellen Pettitt (born 13 May 1986 in Perth) is an Australian high jumper turned triple jumper.

She finished sixth at the 2003 World Youth Championships and at the 2006 Commonwealth Games.

Her personal best in the high jump is 1.91 metres, first achieved in March 2006 in Melbourne. Her triple jump personal best is 13.54 metres, set in 2014 in Glasgow.

== Achievements ==
Year	Competition	Venue	Position	Event	Notes
Representing Australia
2003	World Youth Championships	Sherbrooke, Canada	10th	High jump	1.75 m
2004	World Junior Championships	Grosseto, Italy	17th (q)	High jump	1.75 m
2006	Commonwealth Games	Melbourne, Australia	6th	High jump	1.83 m
2009	Universiade	Kazan, Russia	12th	High jump	1.80 m
2010	Oceania Championships	Cairns, Australia	2nd	High jump	1.74 m
2010	Commonwealth Games	Delhi, India	11th	High jump	1.78 m
2013	Universiade	Kazan, Russia	11th	Triple jump	13.04 m
2014	Commonwealth Games	Delhi, India	6th	Triple jump	13.54 m
