= Alex Hartmann =

Australian sprinter

Personal information
- Full name: Alexander Hartmann
- Born: 7 March 1993 (age 33) Adelaide, South Australia
- Education: Max Fitness College
- Height: 1.98 m (6 ft 6 in)
- Weight: 91 kg (201 lb)

Sport
- Event: 200 m
- Coached by: Travis Venema
- Updated on 10 July 2016

Alexander Hartmann (born 7 March 1993) is an Australian sprinter who competes primarily in the 200 metres and qualified for the 2016 Summer Olympics in Rio de Janeiro, Brazil.

== Biography ==
Hartmann was born on 7 March 1993 in Elizabeth Vale, South Australia, Australia. He was educated at Boondall State School and Aspley State High School in Brisbane.

=== Career ===
Hartmann was selected as a reserve for the 4 × 100 metre relay team for the first ever world relay championships; he eventually competed as an injury replacement as the Australian quartet, which also included Jin Su Jung, Jarrod Geddes and Jake Hammond, finished sixth in their heat in a time of 39.21 seconds. The team then failed to finish the B final. He was also selected as a reserve for the 2014 Commonwealth Games in Glasgow, Scotland, but did not compete.

At the 2015 Australian national championships, he won the 200 metre event and finished second in the 100 metres. He was part of the Australian team for the 2015 IAAF World Relays. Alongside Trae Williams, Jin Su Jung and Ben Jaworski in the men's 4 × 100 metre relay, Hartmann finished sixth in the third heat and 20th overall in a time of 39.75 seconds.

In February 2016, Hartmann ran the fastest 200 metre time by an Australian since 2006, finishing a race in Adelaide in 20.45 seconds. In April 2016 he was selected as part of the Australian team for the 2016 Summer Olympics, to be held in Rio de Janeiro, Brazil. He was chosen to represent the nation in the men's 200 metre event after winning the Australian national title in a time of 20.46 seconds. He is the first male Australian competitor in the Olympic 200 metres since the 2004 Summer Olympics in Athens. Hartmann also won the Australian national title in the 100 metres but did not achieve the qualification time for the 2016 Olympics.
