= Alex Beck =

Australian athlete (born 1992)

Personal information
- Nationality: Australian
- Born: Alexander Beck; 7 February 1992 (age 34)

Sport
- Sport: Track and Field
- Event: 400 metres

Achievements and titles
- Personal bests: 400m: 45.54 (Tokyo, 2021)
Medal record
Men's athletics
Representing AUS
Oceania Championships
Bronze medal – third place	2024 Suva	400 m

Alexander (Alex) Beck (born 7 February 1992) is an Australian Olympic athlete who competed primarily over 400 metres. He is a multiple-time Australian national champion.

== Biography ==
From Benowa, Queensland, Beck was aged 16 when he came third in the 400 metres at the Australian Junior Championships. Following that, selection on the Australian World Youth team in 2009 followed and selection for the World Junior Championships the following year. Beck was selected for the Moscow 2013 IAAF World Athletics Championships where he was a member of the team that ran the 4 x 400 metres relay. Beck then competed for Australia in the 4 x 400 metres relay at the 2014 Commonwealth Games.

Beck won the 400 metres Australian championships in 2021, running 46.01 to defeat five time national champion Steve Solomon, before doubling up and being awarded the 200 metres title as well after Abdoulie Asim was disqualified for running out of his lane. This made him the first Australian man in 30 years to win both races in the same year.

Beck was selected to represent Australia in the men's 400 metres at the 2020 Summer Games in Tokyo. He ran a personal best of 45.54 to finish sixth in his heat. At the 2022 Oceania Athletics Championships Beck won the gold medal in the 400 metres race. Beck reached the semi-finals of the 400 metres event at the 2022 World Athletics Championships in Eugene, Oregon, with a run of 45.99.

He ran as part of the Australian 4x400m relay team at the 2024 World Relays Championships in Nassau, Bahamas.

== Personal life ==
Beck completed his Bachelor of Exercise Science degree prior to studying for a Doctor of Physiotherapy degree from Bond University. He is now a qualified physiotherapist.
