= Hamish Peacock =

Australian javelin thrower

Personal information
- Nationality: Australian
- Born: 15 October 1990 (age 35) Hobart, Tasmania, Australia
- Education: University of Tasmania
- Height: 1.86 m (6 ft 1 in)
- Weight: 105 kg (231 lb)

Sport
- Country: Australia
- Sport: Athletics
- Event: Javelin Throw
- Club: UTAS Athletics Club
- Coached by: Evan Peacock

Achievements and titles
- Personal best: 84.39 m (2016)
Medal record
World Youth Championships
Silver medal – second place	2007 Ostrava	Javelin
Commonwealth Games
Bronze medal – third place	2014 Glasgow	Javelin
Silver medal – second place	2018 Gold Coast	Javelin

Hamish Peacock (born 15 October 1990) is an Australian track and field athlete who competes in the javelin throw. He has competed at the Commonwealth Games, World Championships and the Summer Olympics.

== Records and rankings ==
Peacock is four-time Australian Champion in the javelin. He is the fifth-best Australian of all time in the javelin, and is a 16 time Tasmanian champion and record holder. He is ranked 4th and 6th on the all-time Tasmanian records list in Discus and Shot put respectively. Peacock, who is coached by his father Evan, has trained in the Javelin throw, shot put and discus.

== Competitions ==
=== Olympic Games ===
Peacock represented Australia at the 2016 Olympic Games in Rio de Janeiro finishing in 25th place in Qualifying with a throw off 77.91m, Brazil.

=== Senior World Championships ===
Peacock was selected to compete in the 2013 World Championships in Moscow in the javelin. He finished 14th out of 16 in qualification group A with a throw of 76.33m. His throw would have placed him 13th in qualification group B. Overall his throw placed him 26th out of 33 athletes in the qualification stages. This did not qualify him for the final and this was the end of Peacock's competition.

Peacock represented Australia in the 2015 World Championships in Beijing finishing 18th with a throw of 79.37m.

Peacock represented Australia at the 2017 World Championships in London finishing 14th with a throw of 82.46m which became at the time the longest throw to not qualify for a World or Olympic javelin final.

=== Commonwealth Games ===
Peacock was selected for the 2014 Commonwealth Games in Glasgow in the Javelin. He advanced to the finals after surpassing the 78.00m automatic qualification standard in qualifying with a distance of 79.08m. He then went on to win the bronze medal in the final with a throw of 81.75m.

Peacock won the silver medal in the men's javelin at the 2018 Commonwealth games on the Gold Coast with a throw of 82.59m.

=== Diamond League ===
Peacock has competed in a number of diamond league competitions following his debut in Doha in 2015. His best finish is 3rd place on two occasions in New York 2015 and London in 2016. His longest throw in a diamond league competition in 84.25m to finish 4th in Oslo in 2016 which remains his longest throw outside of Australia.

=== Youth & Junior World Championships ===
Peacock has competed in one World Youth Championships (2007) and one World Junior Championships (2008). He competed in the javelin at both competitions and made the final in each. In the 2007 World Youth Championships in Ostrava Peacock finished second in the javelin.

== Family ==
Peacock is the older brother of fellow athlete Huw Peacock. Huw was selected, along with Hamish, to participate in the 2014 Commonwealth Games in Glasgow and the 2018 Commonwealth Games in Gold Coast. Huw's event is the Hammer throw. Huw is ranked 17th on the Australian all-time hammer throw rankings, with a personal best of 68.48m. Huw is two years younger than Hamish. Both were coached by their father Evan, and were based at the Domain Athletics Centre in Hobart, Tasmania.

== Statistics ==
=== Personal bests ===
Event	Performance	Venue	Date
Shot put	15.46 m	Hobart, Australia	11 July 2010
Discus	51.93 m	Hobart, Australia	7 April 2012
Javelin	84.39 m	Hobart, Tasmania, Australia	22 May 2016

=== Progression ===
Year	Javelin
2006	63.11 m
2007	68.08 m
2008	74.44 m
2009	74.54 m
2010	73.66 m
2011	77.58 m
2012	79.33 m
2013	81.14 m
2014	82.24 m
2015	83.31 m
2016	84.39 m
2017	84.36 m
2018	83.63 m
2019	78.12 m
2020	80.20 m
2021	73.39 m
2022	77.15 m

== Achievements ==
Year	Competition	Venue	Position	Event	Notes
Representing Australia
2007	World Youth Championships	Ostrava, Czech Republic	2nd	Javelin	76.31 m
2008	World Junior Championships	Bydgoszcz, Poland	5th	Javelin	74.44 m
2013	World Championships	Moscow, Russia	26th (q)	Javelin	76.33 m
2014	Commonwealth Games	Glasgow, Scotland	3rd	Javelin	81.75 m
2015	World Championships	Beijing, China	18th (q)	Javelin	79.37 m
2016	Olympic Games	Rio de Janeiro, Brazil	25th (q)	Javelin	77.91 m
2017	World Championships	London, United Kingdom	14th (q)	Javelin	82.46 m
2018	Commonwealth Games	Gold Coast, Australia	2nd	Javelin	82.59 m
