= Alwyn Jones (athlete) =

Australian triple jumper (born 1985)

Alwyn Jones (born 28 February 1985) is an Australian triple jumper.

Jones was born in Australia. He attended Victoria University.

He finished fifth at the 2004 World Junior Championships, won the bronze medal at the 2006 Commonwealth Games and finished eighth at the 2006 World Cup. Jones is also a nine-time national champion.

His personal best is 16.83 metres, achieved when he won the 2009 Australian Championships in Brisbane.
