= Alexandra Hulley =

Australian athlete

Personal information
- Nationality: Australian
- Born: 24 July 1997 (age 29)

Sport
- Sport: Athletics
- Event: Hammer
Medal record
Track and field
Representing Australia
Commonwealth Games
Silver medal – second place	2018 Gold Coast	Hammer Throw
Pacific Games
Gold medal – first place	2019 Apia	Hammer Throw
Youth Olympic Games
Silver medal – second place	2014 Nanjing	Hammer Throw

Alexandra Hulley (born 24 July 1997) is an Australian athlete. She competed in the women's hammer throw at the 2018 Commonwealth Games, winning the silver medal.
