= 2023 New Zealand Track and Field Championships =

Domestic athletics championship event

2023 New Zealand Track & Field Championships
- Dates: 2–5 March
- Host city: Wellington
- Venue: Newtown Park
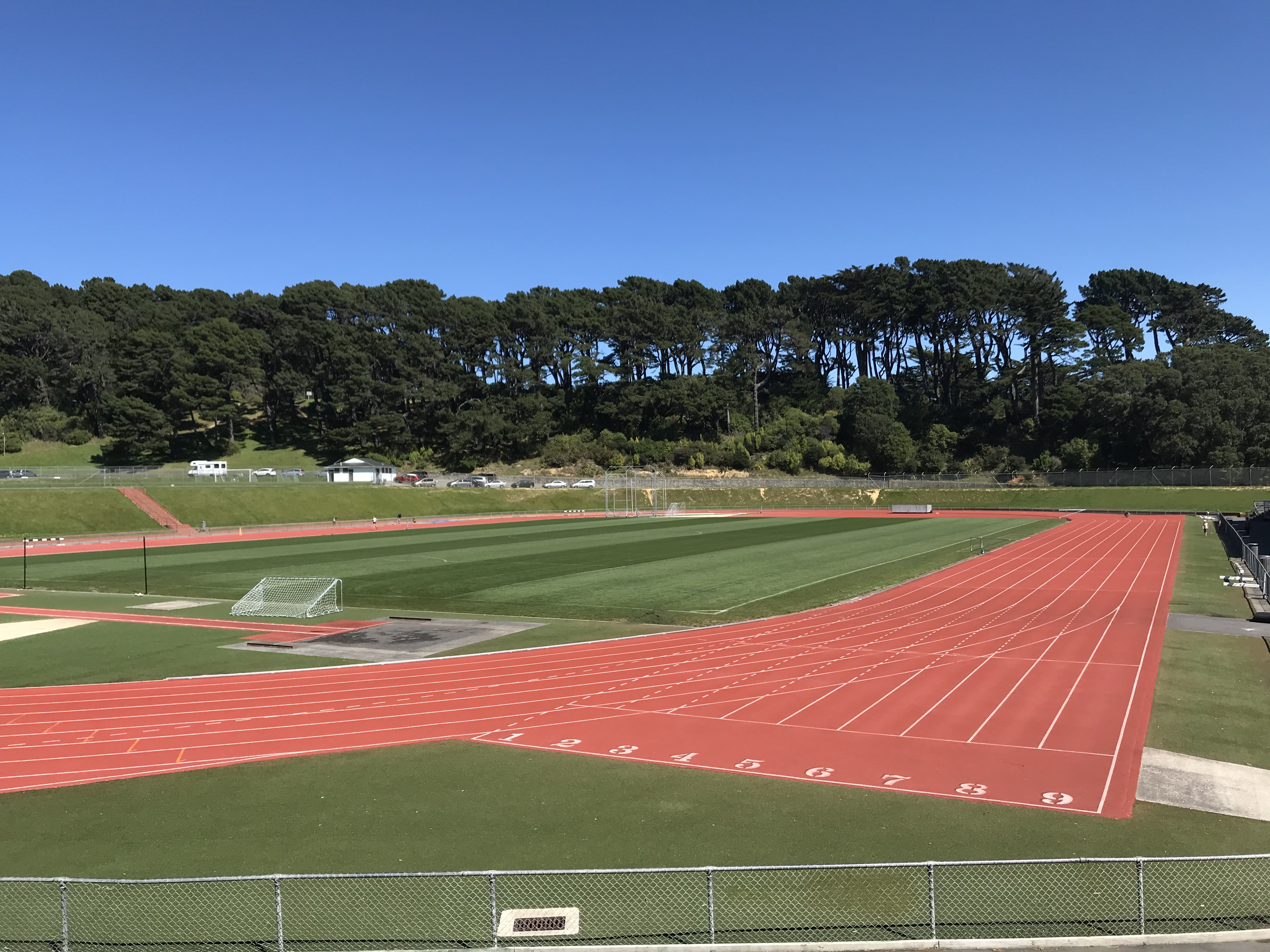

The 2023 New Zealand Athletics Championships was the national championship in outdoor track and field for New Zealand. It was held from 2–5 March at Newtown Park in Wellington. The 10,000 metres was held separately on 19 November 2022 and The Combined Events Championship (incorporating the Decathlon & Heptathlon NZ Championships) was held from 25 to 26 February.

== Results ==
=== Men ===
Event	Gold		Silver		Bronze	
100 metres (wind: +5.2 m/s)	Tiaan Whelpton	10.13 w	Dhruv Rodrigues-Chico	10.31	James Guthrie-Croft	10.57
200 metres (wind: -0.4 m/s)	Dhruv Rodrigues-Chico	21.10	Hamish Gill	21.27	Tommy Te Puni	21.45
400 metres	Lex Revell-Lewis	47.68	Fergus McLeay	48.11	Troy Middleton	48.22
800 metres	James Preston	1:49.80	Brad Mathas	1:49.88	Dominic Devlin	1:50.79
1,500 metres	Sam Tanner	3:53.03	Eric Speakman	3:54.05	Russell Green	3:54.13
5,000 metres	Julian Oakley	13:52.32	Eric Speakman	14:02.23	Connor Melton	14:10.11
10,000 metres**	Julian Oakley	29:19.36	Eric Speakman	30:07.66	Nathan Tse	30:17.14
110 m hurdles (wind: -0.3)	Josh Hawkins	13.94	Masaki Tomooka	15.37	Max Attwell	15.70
400 m hurdles	Jonathan Maples	54.05	Cameron Moffitt	56.08	Louis Andrews	58.29
3,000 m steeplechase	Michael Sutton	9:17.92	Ieuan van der Peet*	9:27.44	Buddy Small*	9:46.82
4 × 100 m relay	Otago	40.74	Manawatū-Whanganui	42.16	Canterbury	42.31
4 × 400 m relay	Otago	3:14.16	Wellington	3:15.06	Canterbury	3:16.33
10,000 m walk	Lucas Martin	46:10.02				
High jump	Hamish Kerr	2.20 m	Adam Stack	2.07 m	Mate Poduje	2.03 m
Pole vault	James Steyn	5.26 m	Nicholas Southgate	5.11 m	Max Attwell	4.81 m
Long jump	Shay Veitch	7.65 m	Felix McDonald	7.47 m	Lewis Arthur	7.23 m
Triple jump	Ebuka Okpala	15.39 m	Scott Thomson	14.49 m	Ethan Gow	13.54 m
Shot put	Jacko Gill	21.80 m	Tom Walsh	21.25 m	Nick Palmer	18.48 m
Discus throw	Connor Bell	61.33 m	Kieran Fowler	50.79 m	Jade Zaia	49.36 m
Hammer throw	Anthony Nobilo	66.95 m	Todd Bates	56.14 m	Philip Jensen*	51.48 m
Javelin throw	Douw Botes	63.62 m	Jared Neighbours	60.64 m	Anton Schroeders	59.37 m
Decathlon**	Max Attwell	7,564 points	Masaki Tomooka	6,629 points	Cameron Moffitt	6,279 points

=== Women ===
Event	Gold		Silver		Bronze	
100 metres (wind: +3.4)	Zoe Hobbs	10.89	Rosie Elliott	11.36	Brooke Somerfield	11.51
200 metres	Georgia Hulls	23.89	Brooke Somerfield	24.12	Tamsin Harvey	24.64
400 metres	Rosie Elliott	52.39	Portia Bing	53.09	Stella Pearless	55.32
800 metres	Alison Andrews-Paul	2:05.01	Jennifer Hauke	2:06.32	Holly Manning	2:06.87
1,500 metres	Laura Nagel	4:13.25	Rebekah Greene	4:16.23	Anneke Grogan	4:21.81
5,000 metres	Laura Nagel	16:40.33	Anneke Grogan	16:43.68	Katherine Camp	16:48.25
10,000 metres**	Hannah Miller	34:25.26	Sarah Drought	34:36.41	Olivia Witney	35:00.41
100 m hurdles	Anna Percy	13.57	Alessandra MacDonald	14.26	Celine Pearn	14.31
400 m hurdles	Portia Bing	57.12	Alessandra Macdonald*	1:03.32	Sophie Adams*	1:06.65
3000 m s'chase	Anneke Grogan	10:40.12	Saraya Lindsay	11:41.76	Laura Smidt	12:45.56
4 × 100 m relay	Auckland	49.71				
4 × 400 m relay	Auckland	3:48.57	Canterbury	3:50.36	Hawkes Bay-Gisborne	3:52.79
10,000 m walk	Laura Langley	50:09.08	Courtney Ruske	52:18.87		
High jump	Alice Taylor	1.87m	Maddie Wilson	1.84m	Imogen Skelton	1.76m
Pole vault	Eliza McCartney	4.61m	Olivia McTaggart	4.61m	Imogen Ayris	4.46m
Long jump	Mariah Ririnui	6.08m	Kelsey Berryman	6.00m	Hannah Sandilands	5.94m
Triple jump	Anna Thomson	12.62m	Alessandra MacDonald	11.63m	Hannah Collins	11.51m
Shot put	Maddi Wesche	19.13m	Natalia Rankin-Chitar	14.93m	Lexi Maples*	12.34m
Discus throw	Tatiana Kaumoana	54.69m	Savannah Scheen	52.96m	Natalia Rankin-Chitar	48.90m
Hammer throw	Lauren Bruce	67.83m	Lexi Maples	59.81m	Dyani Shepherd-Oates	54.03m
Javelin throw	Tori Peeters	60.60m	Abbey Moody	45.19m	Leala Willman	36.70m
Heptathlon**	Christina Ryan	5,387 Points	Maddie Wilson	5,235 Points	Brianna Stephenson	5,127 Points

'*' Indicates athlete was the placing New Zealand athlete, but was beaten by a 'visiting' athlete from overseas.
'**' Indicates the event was held at another date and/or venue outside the main championship event.
