= Boh Ritchie =

New Zealand middle-distance runner (born 2007)

Personal information
- Born: 8 February 2007 (age 19)

Sport
- Country: New Zealand
- Sport: Athletics
- Event: Middle-distance running

Achievements and titles
- National finals: 800 m champion (2025)
Medal record
Women's athletics
Representing New Zealand
Oceania Championships
Bronze medal – third place	2024 Suva	1500 m

Boh Ritchie (born 8 February 2007) is a New Zealand middle-distance runner. She won the 800 metres race at the 2025 New Zealand Athletics Championships, and holds multiple New Zealand age-group records. She represented New Zealand at the 2026 World Athletics Cross Country Championships.

== Biography ==
Ritchie is from Tamahere on the outskirts of Hamilton, New Zealand, and is a member of Hamilton City Hawks. She attended St Peter's School, Cambridge. In 2021, a week before her 14th birthday, she placed second over 3000 metres in the New Zealand U20 Championships. Ritchie won New Zealand age-group titles in 2022 and 2023 at various distances, including the under-20 mile run covering the 1.6 km distance in a blistering 5:2.67 seconds, the U20 5k run, and U20 cross country championships in 2022, an U18 1500 metres and 3000m double and a repeat of the U20 million title in 2023. She also represented New Zealand in the U20 race at the 2023 World Athletics Cross Country Championships.

Ritchie competed as a 16 year-old at the Potts Classic in Hastings in January 2024, where she ran two seconds under her personal best with 2:06:51 in the Sylvia Potts Memorial 800 metres. Ritchie represented New Zealand in the U20 race at the 2024 World Athletics Cross Country Championships in Belgrade, Serbia. She won the bronze medal in the 1500 metres behind compatriot Laura Nagel at the 2024 Oceania Athletics Championships in Suva, Fiji, in June 2024. She competed over 1500 metres and in the 800 metres at the 2024 World Athletics U20 Championships in Lima, Peru, where she was a semi-finalist and set a personal best of 2:05.60.

Ritchie won the 800 metres at the senior New Zealand Athletics Championships in Dunedin in March 2025. In the space of a month in 2025, Ritchie set New Zealand U20 records over 800m, 1000m, 1500m and 5000m. This included, in December 2025, Ritchie breaking Lorraine Moller's junior 800 metres best with 2:03.14s in Sydney.

In January 2026, she ran as part of the New Zealand mixed 4x2 km relay team which placed 14th overall at the 2026 World Athletics Cross Country Championships in Tallahassee, Florida. Having accepted a scholarship offer from Penn State University in the United States, in February 2026 she was named The Big Ten Conference Women’s Indoor Track and Field Freshman of the Week, having run a personal best 2:01.60 in her first collegiate 800m race in which she placed second only to teammate Hayley Kitching. That spring, she ran alongside Kitching to win the 4x800m relay at the Penn Relays.

In March 2026, at the 2026 World Athletics Indoor Championships in Toruń, Poland, Ritchie finished fifth in her heat of the 800 metres and did not advance to the semi-finals.
