= Athletics at the 2025 Pacific Mini Games =

- Dates: 4 – 9 July
- Host city: Koror, Palau
- Venue: National Stadium
- Events: 52
- Records set: 2 games records

The athletics competition at the 2025 Pacific Mini Games was held from July 4 to 9, 2025 at the National Stadium in Koror, Palau. The sport of athletics at these Games was split into three distinct sets of events: track and field events, road running events and para-events. A total of 52 events were held with the addition of a mixed relay event. The 3000m steeplechase and pole vault events were not contested.

== Medal table ==
* Host nation (Palau)

Rank	Nation	Gold	Silver	Bronze	Total
1	Papua New Guinea	17	20	13	50
2	Fiji	11	11	8	30
3	Australia	7	5	4	16
4	Guam	3	3	2	8
5	Wallis and Futuna	3	1	2	6
6	Northern Mariana Islands	3	0	1	4
7	French Polynesia	2	3	7	12
8	New Caledonia	2	3	1	6
9	Samoa	1	1	1	3
10	Tonga	1	0	3	4
11	Cook Islands	1	0	1	2
11	Marshall Islands	1	0	1	2
13	Solomon Islands	0	4	3	7
14	Nauru	0	1	2	3
14	Vanuatu	0	1	2	3
16	Palau*	0	0	1	1
Totals (16 entries)		52	53	52	157

== Events summary ==
=== Men's ===
Event	Gold		Silver		Bronze	
100 metres wind: 0.0 m/s	Pais Wisil; Papua New Guinea	10.51	Tovetuna Tuna; Papua New Guinea	10.53	Waisake Tewa; Fiji	10.60
200 metres wind: +1.2 m/s	Tovetuna Tuna; Papua New Guinea	21.19	Waisake Tewa; Fiji	21.60 PB	Johnny Bai; Papua New Guinea	21.92
400 metres	Adolf Kauba; Papua New Guinea	48.04 SB	Daniel Baul; Papua New Guinea	48.35 SB	Jeremiah N'Godrela; New Caledonia	48.91 PB
800 metres	Jiuteis Robinson; Papua New Guinea	1:52.56 PB	Stephen Rahuasi; Solomon Islands	1:53.50 PB	Adolf Kauba; Papua New Guinea	1:54.39
1500 metres	Hugh Kent; Guam	4:01.37 PB	Jiuteis Robinson; Papua New Guinea	4:02.18 PB	Abel Siune; Papua New Guinea	4:05.72
5000 metres	Yeshnil Karan; Fiji	15:27.62	Hugh Kent; Guam	15:37.19	Abel Siune; Papua New Guinea	15:44.30 PB
10,000 metres	Hugh Kent; Guam	33:03.34 NU20R	Junior Geejay; Solomon Islands	33:14.03 PB	Siune Kagl; Papua New Guinea	33:23.87 SB
110 metres hurdles wind: +2.8 m/s	Errol Qaqa; Fiji	14.59	Maika Pedro; Samoa	15.61	Alex Dunn; Australia	15.73
400 metres hurdles	Daniel Baul; Papua New Guinea	51.55 PB	Sialis Passingan; Papua New Guinea	52.42 PB	William Peka; Papua New Guinea	52.70 PB
4×100 metres relay	Papua New Guinea; Pais Wisil; Johnny Bai; Emmanuel Anis; Tovetuna Tuna; Daniel Baul^{[b]}	40.23 NR	Fiji; Ratu Penaia Ramasirai; Waisake Tewa; Waisea Tuiyabayaba; Waisele Inoke; Francis Bakaniceva^{[b]}	40.76 SB	Samoa; Taitaifono Samasoni; Asalemo Fanolua; Maika Pedro; Johnny Key; Richard Sulifoa^{[b]}	42.73 SB
4×400 metres relay	Papua New Guinea; Daniel Baul; Johnny Bai; Jiuteis Robinson; Adolf Kauba	3:15.42 SB	Fiji; Waisea Tuiyabayaba; Waisake Tewa; Samuela Railoa; Ratu Meli Romuakalou	3:17.78 SB	Solomon Islands; Luke Haga; Stephen Rahuasi; Leeroy Alulu; Francis Dau	3:20.78 SB
Half marathon	Yeshnil Karan; Fiji	1:14:58 SB	Junior Geejay; Solomon Islands	1:15:23 PB	Damien Troquenet; French Polynesia	1:15:31 SB
High jump	Samasoni Hewitt; Cook Islands	2.00 m	Lucas Faber; Australia	1.95 m		
High jump	Samasoni Hewitt; Cook Islands	2.00 m	Cooper Blake; Australia	1.95 m PB		
Long jump	Aden McDonald; Australia	6.90 m wind: 0.0 m/s	David Raibiriki; Fiji	6.77 m wind: 0.0 m/s	Piritau Nga; Cook Islands	6.65 m wind: -1.5 m/s
Triple jump	Frederico Miller; Fiji	13.89 m PB wind: 0.0 m/s	Pol-Elie Raoult; French Polynesia	13.76 m PB wind: -0.8 m/s	Samuela Vunivalu; Fiji	13.70 m PB wind: -0.8 m/s
Shot put	Stephen Mailagi; Wallis and Futuna	18.72 m	Jonathan Detageouwa; Nauru	17.19 m NR	Tapuakitau Lakalaka; Wallis and Futuna	15.30 m PB
Discus throw	Angus Clues; Australia	47.26 m	Stephen Mailagi; Wallis and Futuna	45.99 m	Tapuakitau Lakalaka; Wallis and Futuna	45.90 m SB
Hammer throw	Lyle Andrew; Northern Mariana Islands	33.06 m	Glen Finau; Fiji	29.63 m PB	Alonzo Acosta; Guam	23.62 m
Javelin throw	Lakona Gerega; Papua New Guinea	67.43 m NR	Lucas Osida; Papua New Guinea	62.81 m PB	Toby Camilleri; Australia	59.32 m
Octathlon	Waisele Inoke; Fiji	5241 pts PB	Karo Iga; Papua New Guinea	5019 pts SB	Jonah Harris; Nauru	4175 pts NR

=== Women's ===
Event	Gold		Silver		Bronze	
100 metres wind: +0.3 m/s	Kayedel Smith; Australia	12.16	Isila Apkup; Papua New Guinea	12.17	Sera Nasilivata; Fiji	12.20 =PB
200 metres wind: +2.0 m/s	Heleina Young; Fiji	24.01 PB	Isila Apkup; Papua New Guinea	24.55 SB	Kayedel Smith; Australia	24.75
400 metres	Heleina Young; Fiji	56.05 PB	Patricia Kuku; Papua New Guinea	58.08	Joy Tieba; Papua New Guinea	58.50 PB
800 metres	Scholastica Herman; Papua New Guinea	2:16.41 SB	Adi Ceva Lutumailagi; Fiji	2:18.47 PB	Jordan Baden; Guam	2:18.68 PB
1500 metres	Scholastica Herman; Papua New Guinea	4:46.94 SB	Jordan Baden; Guam	4:47.64	Amandine Matera; French Polynesia	4:49.96 PB
5000 metres	Jordan Baden; Guam	17:45.37 GR, PB	Natalia Prado; New Caledonia	18:01.31 PB	Nathania Tan; Northern Mariana Islands	18:20.97
10,000 metres	Nathania Tan; Northern Mariana Islands	38:03.57 SB	Natalia Prado; New Caledonia	38:29.15 PB	Louise Grosgogeat; French Polynesia	39:48.01
100 metres hurdles wind: +1.4 m/s	Kiara Gilroy; French Polynesia	15.63 PB	Hazel Wilson; Guam	16.46 PB	Manatu Hafoka; Tonga	18.07
400 metres hurdles	Hereiti Bernardino; French Polynesia	1:05.00 SB	Raylyne Kanam; Papua New Guinea	1:07.36 SB	'Ofa Tu'ifua; Tonga	1:09.53 PB
4×100 metres relay	Papua New Guinea; Hephzibah Romalus; Denlyne Kinbangi; Joy Tieba; Isila Apkup	47.18 SB	Fiji; Melania Turaga; Heleina Young; Braelyn Yee; Sera Nasilivata	47.33 SB	French Polynesia; Mihivai Atrewe; Alessa Llerena-Soulie; Kiara Gilroy; Hereiti Bernardino	48.97 SB
4×400 metres relay	Fiji; Sesenieli Rasoki; Heleina Young; Melania Turaga; Adi Ceva Lutumailagi	3:51.88 SB	Papua New Guinea; Isila Apkup; Joy Tieba; Scholastica Herman; Patricia Kuku	3:53.94 SB	French Polynesia; Alessa Llerena-Soulie; Mihivai Atrewe; Kiara Gilroy; Hereiti Bernardino	4:03.18 SB
Half marathon	Nathania Tan; Northern Mariana Islands	1:28:40 NR	Natalia Prado; New Caledonia	1:32:11 PB	Dianah Matekali; Solomon Islands	1:32:29 SB
High jump	Zoe Peacock; Australia	1.75 m	Hephzibah Romalus; Papua New Guinea	1.55 m PB	Olivia Reed; Marshall Islands	1.50 m PB
High jump	Zoe Peacock; Australia	1.75 m	Hephzibah Romalus; Papua New Guinea	1.55 m PB	Reki Selita Roberts; Fiji	1.50 m
Long jump	Olivia Reed; Marshall Islands	5.14 m wind: 0.0 m/s	Sereana Viriviri; Fiji	4.79 m PB wind: 0.0 m/s	Shalinzar Kakiouea; Nauru	4.29 m PB wind: 0.0 m/s
Triple jump	Raphaila Idris; Australia	11.90 m wind: -2.2 m/s	Reki Selita Roberts; Fiji	11.00 m SB wind: 0.0 m/s	Sydney Francisco; Palau	9.97 m NR wind: -1.7 m/s
Shot put	ʻAta Maama Tuutafaiva; Tonga	14.76 m SB	Taylor Larsson; Australia	14.18 m PB	Maryann Macedru; Fiji	13.81 m NU20R
Discus throw	Charlize Goody; Australia	49.43 m	Loata Lewageena; Fiji	48.15 m PB	Brieanna Rabakewa; Fiji	45.61 m PB
Hammer throw	Iorana Taufafo Tafili; Samoa	54.13 m NR	Natasha Lynch; Australia	53.43 m PB	Emily Thomas; Australia	52.75 m
Javelin throw	Charlize Goody; Australia	49.30 m	Isabelle Cruickshank; Australia	46.06 m	Loata Lewageena; Fiji	45.32 m NU20R
Heptathlon	Reki Selita Roberts; Fiji	4250 pts SB	Raylyne Kanam; Papua New Guinea	3816 pts SB	Manatu Hafoka; Tonga	3228 pts PB

=== Mixed ===
Event	Gold		Silver		Bronze	
4×400 metres relay	Papua New Guinea; Daniel Baul; Patricia Kuku; Adolf Kauba; Isila Apkup	3:30.15 GR, SB	Fiji; Waisake Tewa; Heleina Young; Waisea Tuiyabayaba; Adi Ceva Lutumailagi	3:31.77 NR	French Polynesia; Timothee Aumard; Mihivai Atrewe; Pol-Elie Raoult; Kiara Gilroy	3:39.68 NR

^{b} Athletes who participated in the heats only and received medals.

== Para-events summary ==
Men

Event	Gold		Silver		Bronze		Ref
100 m ambulant	Tom Lulait (T13); New Caledonia	11.90 (87.89%)	Junior Dennis (T47/F46); Papua New Guinea	12.20 (85.40%)	Jimi Onitoro (T46); Fiji	12.62 (82.56%)	
100 m wheelchair	Morea Mararos (T/F34); Papua New Guinea	37.83 (38.22%)	Jerome Bunge (F57); Papua New Guinea	39.45 (34.55%)	Christian Chee Ayee (T54/F56); French Polynesia	42.95 (31.73%)	
Long jump ambulant	Tom Lulait (T13); New Caledonia	5.68m (74.75%)	Junior Dennis (T47/F46); Papua New Guinea	5.51m (72.69%)	Steven Abraham (T46); Papua New Guinea	5.46m (72.03%)	
Shot put ambulant	Soane Meissonnier (F20); Wallis and Futuna	16.51m (95.48%)	Donald Laeta (F44); Solomon Islands	9.14m (58.10%)	Junior Dennis (T47/F46); Papua New Guinea	9.42m (56.07%)	
Shot put secured	Morea Mararos (T/F34); Papua New Guinea	7.57m (62.20%)	Christian Chee Ayee (T54/F56); French Polynesia	7.56m (57.30%)	Jerome Bunge (F57); Papua New Guinea	8.71m (57.07%)	
Discus throw secured	Jerome Bunge (F57); Papua New Guinea	28.29m (58.26%)	Christian Chee Ayee (T54/F56); French Polynesia	21.84m (46.78%)	Breeze Pita (F57); Solomon Islands	21.27m (43.81%)	
Javelin throw ambulant	Soane Meissonnier (F20); Wallis and Futuna	50.18m (88.28%)	Ken Kahu (F44); Vanuatu	48.37m (73.08%)	Junior Dennis (T47/F46); Papua New Guinea	45.59m (71.26%)	

Women

Event	Gold		Silver		Bronze		Ref
100 m ambulant	Dorna Longbut (T/F46); Papua New Guinea	14.28 (83.26%)	Manega Tapari (T47/F46); Papua New Guinea	14.90 (79.79%)	Marcelline Moli (T/F46); Vanuatu	18.42 (78.37%)	
Long jump ambulant	Dorna Longbut (T/F46); Papua New Guinea	4.56m (70.47%)	Manega Tapari (T47/F46); Papua New Guinea	4.46m (68.93%)	Marcelline Moli (T/F46); Vanuatu	3.76m (58.11%)	
Shot put ambulant	Naibili Vatunisolo (F42); Fiji	8.72m (74.91%)	Dorna Longbut (T/F46); Papua New Guinea	9.15m (68.69%)	Manega Tapari (T47/F46); Papua New Guinea	8.98m (67.41%)	
Javelin throw ambulant	Naibili Vatunisolo (F42); Fiji	21.96m (69.69%)	Regina Edward (F44); Papua New Guinea	29.23m (67.78%)	Manega Tapari (T47/F46); Papua New Guinea	26.15m (57.18%)	

== See also ==
- Athletics at the 2023 Pacific Games
