= 2024 Oceania Athletics Championships =

- Dates: 1–7 June
- Host city: Suva, Fiji
- Venue: HFC Bank Stadium
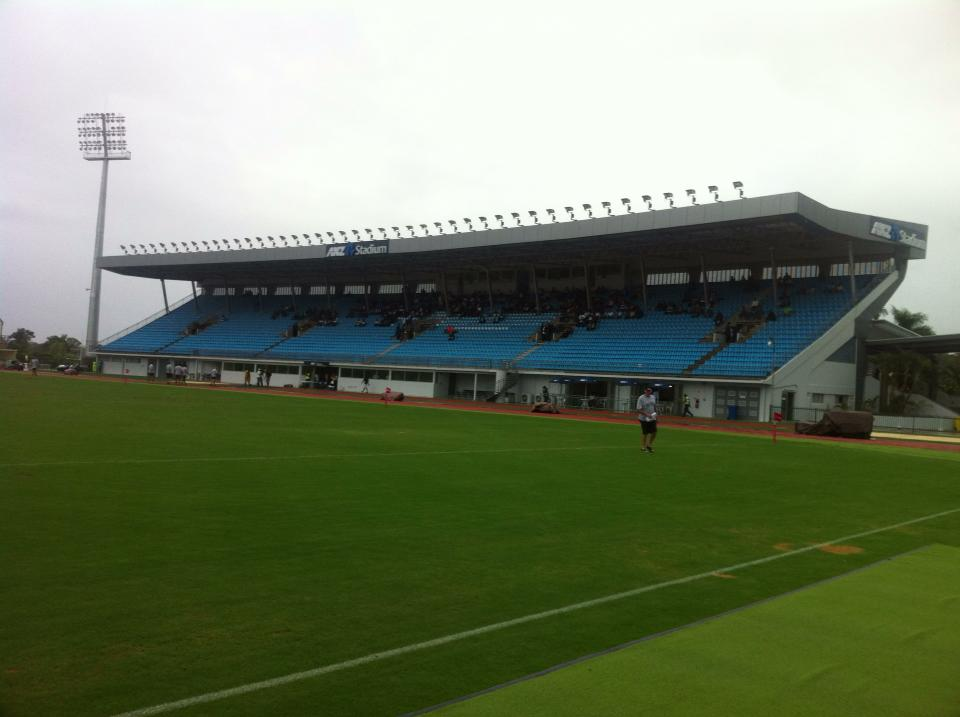
- Level: Senior
- Type: Outdoor
- Events: 45
- Participation: 19 nations
- Records set: 17 Championship records

The 17th Oceania Athletics Championships were held from 1 to 7 June 2024 at the HFC Bank Stadium in Suva, Fiji.

It was the third time Fiji had staged the sporting event after hosting the inaugural 1990 edition, and the 2017 edition both at the HFC Bank Stadium (formerly ANZ Stadium) in Suva. The venue had a track upgrade earlier in 2024 specifically for the championships.

The Championships were held jointly with the U18 Championships, Para Championships and Masters Championships, including the U16 and U20 team challenges.

== Schedule ==
All times are local (UTC+12).

Q	Qualification	H	Heats	R1	Round 1	S	Semi-finals	F	Final
M = morning session, E = evening session

Men
Date →	1 Jun	2 Jun	3 Jun	4 Jun	5 Jun		6 Jun	7 Jun	
Event ↓									
100 m				H	½	F			
200 m							H	½	F
400 m					H		F		
800 m							H	F	
1500 m				F					
5000 m					F				
10,000 m			F						
110 m hurdles								H	F
400 m hurdles				H	F				
3000 m steeplechase							F		
High jump					F				
Pole vault				F					
Long jump							F		
Triple jump								F	
Shot put								F	
Discus throw					F				
Hammer throw				F					
Javelin throw							F		
Decathlon		F							
5000 m walk								F	
10,000 m walk		F							
4 × 100 m relay								F	
4 × 400 m relay				F					

Women
Date →	1 Jun	2 Jun	3 Jun	4 Jun	5 Jun		6 Jun	7 Jun	
Event ↓									
100 m				H	½	F			
200 m							H	½	F
400 m					H		F		
800 m							H	F	
1500 m				F					
5000 m					F				
10,000 m			F						
100 m hurdles								H	F
400 m hurdles				H	F				
3000 m steeplechase							F		
High jump							F		
Pole vault				F					
Long jump					F				
Triple jump								F	
Shot put					F				
Discus throw				F					
Hammer throw							F		
Javelin throw								F	
Heptathlon	F								
5000 m walk								F	
10,000 m walk		F							
4 × 100 m relay								F	
4 × 400 m relay				F					

Mixed
Date →	1 Jun	2 Jun	3 Jun	4 Jun	5 Jun	6 Jun	7 Jun
Event ↓							
4 × 400 m relay							F

== Results ==
Complete results can be found on the Oceania Athletics Association webpage.

=== Men ===
==== Track ====
Event	Gold		Silver		Bronze	
100 metres wind: -0.9 m/s	Joshua Azzopardi; Australia	10.33	Sebastian Sultana; Australia	10.35	Rohan Browning; Australia	10.40
200 metres wind: -3.9 m/s	Calab Law; Australia	20.74	Aidan Murphy; Australia	21.11	Tovetuna Tuna; Papua New Guinea	21.63
400 metres	Luke Van Ratingen; Australia	45.84 CR	Cooper Sherman; Australia	45.97	Alex Beck; Australia	46.41
800 metres	Peyton Craig; Australia	1:46.33 CR	Luke Boyes; Australia	1:46.39	Jack Lunn; Australia	1:49.31
1500 metres	Russell Green; New Zealand	3:58.02	Jamie Mora; New Zealand	3:58.20	David Lee; New Zealand	3:58.31
5000 metres	David McNeill; Australia	14:02.23	Haftu Strintzos; Australia	14:08.03	Matthew Taylor; New Zealand	14:15.06 SB
10,000 metres	Haftu Strintzos; Australia	29:17.97 CR	Andre Waring; Australia	29:55.31	Joshua Phillips; Australia	30:06.56 SB
110 metres hurdles wind: -0.4 m/s	Tayleb Willis; Australia	13.56 PB	Chris Douglas; Australia	13.69	Jacob McCorry; Australia	13.91
400 metres hurdles	Angus Proudfoot; Australia	50.64 CR	Conor Fry; Australia	51.01	Thomas Hunt; Australia	51.47
3000 metres steeplechase	Matthew Clarke; Australia	8:31.00 CR	Ben Buckingham; Australia	8:44.11	Edward Trippas; Australia	8:53.46
5000 metres race walk	Lucas Martin; New Zealand	25:13.83 SB				
10,000 metres race walk	Jack McGinniskin; Australia	47:38.10	Lucas Martin; New Zealand	52:08.14		
4 × 100 metres relay	Papua New Guinea; Alphonse Igish; Emmanuel Anis; Tovetina Tuna; Pais Wisil	41.31 SB	Fiji; Waisele Inoke; Waisake Tewa; Samuela Railoa; Jonacani Koroi	42.03 SB	Samoa; Maika Fred Pedro; Johnny Key; Livingstonerick Savaiinaea; Falatunatuna Solomona	42.97 SB
4 × 400 metres relay	Fiji; Samuela Railoa; Waisake Tewa; Ilisavani Radovu; Jonacani Koroi	3:19.74 SB	Vanuatu; Rizon Leo Rara; Obediah Timbaci; Macaulay John Saunders; Toho Josuah	3:29.83 SB		
WR world record | AR area record | CR championship record | GR games record | NR national record | OR Olympic record | PB personal best | SB season best | WL world leading (in a given season)

==== Field ====
Event	Gold		Silver		Bronze	
High jump	Yual Reath; Australia	2.28 m	Roman Anastasios; Australia	2.25 m PB	Joel Baden; Australia	2.25 m
Pole vault	Dalton Di Medio; Australia	5.25 m	Aiden Princena-White; Australia	5.25 m PB	Triston Vincent; Australia	4.85 m
Long jump	Liam Adcock; Australia	8.05 m CR wind: +0.2 m/s	Henry Frayne; Australia	7.82 m wind: +3.5 m/s	Lewis Arthur; New Zealand	7.29 m wind: +1.9 m/s
Triple jump	Aiden Hinson; Australia	16.32 m CR wind: +0.3 m/s	Welre Olivier; New Zealand	16.17 m wind: +2.6 m/s	Connor Murphy; Australia	16.08 m wind: +0.0 m/s
Shot put	Nick Palmer; New Zealand	19.98 m	Aiden Harvey; Australia	18.29 m	Liam Ngchok-Wulf; New Zealand	16.81 m
Discus throw	Darcy Miller; Australia	52.27 m	Elijah Poila; Cook Islands	44.47 m PB	Jonathan Detageouwa; Nauru	42.90 m NR
Javelin throw	Nash Lowis; Australia	79.67 m CR	Cameron McEntyre; Australia	76.52 m	Cruz Hogan; Australia	70.90 m
Hammer throw	Anthony Nobilo; New Zealand	65.18 m	Timothy Heyes; Australia	64.32 m	Benjamin Roberts; Australia	62.69 m
WR world record | AR area record | CR championship record | GR games record | NR national record | OR Olympic record | PB personal best | SB season best | WL world leading (in a given season)

==== Combined ====
Event	Gold		Silver		Bronze	
Decathlon	Ashley Moloney; Australia	8182 CR	Daniel Golubovic; Australia	8002	Angus Lyver; New Zealand	6922
WR world record | AR area record | CR championship record | GR games record | NR national record | OR Olympic record | PB personal best | SB season best | WL world leading (in a given season)

=== Women ===
==== Track ====
Event	Gold		Silver		Bronze	
100 metres wind: +0.1 m/s	Ella Connolly; Australia	11.41	Ebony Lane; Australia	11.53	Leonie Beu; Papua New Guinea	11.85
200 metres wind: -1.7 m/s	Torrie Lewis; Australia	23.14 CR	Mia Gross; Australia	23.51	Riley Day; Australia	23.63
400 metres	Ellie Beer; Australia	51.91 CR	Mikeala Selaidinakos; Australia	53.11	Amelia Rowe; Australia	55.18
800 metres	Alison Andrews-Paul; New Zealand	2:03.94	Carley Thomas; Australia	2:04.91 SB	Stella Pearless; New Zealand	2:06.96
1500 metres	Laura Nagel; New Zealand	4:22.10	Rebekah Greene; New Zealand	4:24.40	Boh Ritchie; New Zealand	4:25.69
5000 metres	Jenny Blundell; Australia	15:26.29 CR	Holly Campbell; Australia	15:31.88	Maudie Skyring; Australia	15:49.39
100 metres hurdles wind: -1.7 m/s	Liz Clay; Australia	12.99 CR	Celeste Mucci; Australia	13.07	Danielle Shaw; Australia	13.30
400 metres hurdles	Sarah Carli; Australia	56.52	Marli Wilkinson; Australia	57.94	Isabella Guthrie; Australia	58.18
3000 metres steeplechase	Amy Cashin; Australia	9:41.54 CR	Cara Feain-Ryan; Australia	9:48.45	Stella Radford; Australia	10:05.51
10,000 metres race walk	Tayla Billington; Australia	50:03.75	Chelsea Roberts; Australia	52:54.04	Bridget Bell; Australia	53:57.23
4 × 100 metres relay	New Zealand; Amelie Fairclough; Brooke Somerfield; Georgia Hulls; Marielle Venida	46.07 SB	Fiji; Oca Dia Nasulunibawa; Kesaia Boletakanadavau; Melania Turaga; Sereima Rasovasova	48.67 SB	Papua New Guinea; Joy Tieba; Edna Boafob; Janique Mili; Denlyne Siliwen	48.94 SB
4 × 400 metres relay	Papua New Guinea; Raylyne Kanam; Patricia Kuku; Joy Tieba; Denlyne Siliwen	4:01.91 SB	Vanuatu; Lisbeth Kalopong; Claudie David; Lyza Malres; Chloe David	4:16.99 SB		
WR world record | AR area record | CR championship record | GR games record | NR national record | OR Olympic record | PB personal best | SB season best | WL world leading (in a given season)

==== Field ====
Event	Gold		Silver		Bronze	
High jump	Keeley O'Hagan; New Zealand	1.86 m =CR	Imogen Skelton; New Zealand	1.83 m	Alexandra Harrison; Australia Toby Stolberg; Australia	1.79 m 1.79 m
Pole vault	Elyssia Kenshole; Australia	3.80 m	Georgia Tayler; Australia	3.80 m	Julian Sosimo; Solomon Islands	1.85 m SB
Long jump	Samantha Dale; Australia	6.47 m wind: +2.5 m/s	Elizabeth Hedding; Australia	6.41 m wind: +1.7 m/s	Tomysha Clark; Australia	6.36 m SB wind: +1.2 m/s
Triple jump	Desleigh Owusu; Australia	13.45 m wind: +0.5 m/s	Kayla Cuba; Australia	13.10 m wind: +1.3 m/s	Tiana Boras; Australia	12.89 m wind: +2.5 m/s
Shot put	Atamaama Tu'Utafaiva; Tonga	16.24 m SB	Emma Berg; Australia	15.94 m	Natalia Rankin-Chitar; New Zealand	15.66 m
Discus throw	Taryn Gollshewsky; Australia	60.96 m CR	Tatiana Kaumoana; New Zealand	57.59 m PB	Anika Gosling; Australia	51.83 m PB
Javelin throw	Mackenzie Little; Australia	61.09 m	Sharon Toako; Papua New Guinea	47.88 m SB	Iowana Kavekai; Fiji	35.15 m PB
Hammer throw	Lauren Bruce; New Zealand	69.99 m	Aliyah Canepa; Australia	55.58 m PB	Deborah Bulai; Fiji	55.01 m SB
WR world record | AR area record | CR championship record | GR games record | NR national record | OR Olympic record | PB personal best | SB season best | WL world leading (in a given season)

==== Combined ====
Event	Gold		Silver		Bronze	
Heptathlon	Camryn Newton-Smith; Australia	6070 CR	Tori West; Australia	5951	Emelia Surch; Australia	5614 PB
WR world record | AR area record | CR championship record | GR games record | NR national record | OR Olympic record | PB personal best | SB season best | WL world leading (in a given season)

=== Mixed ===
Event	Gold		Silver		Bronze	
4 × 400 metres relay	New Zealand; Angus Lyver; Amelie Fairclough; Lex Revell-Lewis; Madeleine Waddell	3:26.12 NR	Papua New Guinea; Benjamin Aliel; Leonie Beu; Daniel Baul; Isila Apkup	3:28.48 NR	Fiji; Waisake Tewa; Melania Turaga; Jonacani Koroi; Gladness Simpson	3:37.83 NR
WR world record | AR area record | CR championship record | GR games record | NR national record | OR Olympic record | PB personal best | SB season best | WL world leading (in a given season)

== Medal table ==
* Host nation (Fiji)

Rank	Nation	Gold	Silver	Bronze	Total
1	Australia	31	31	25	87
2	New Zealand	10	6	8	24
3	Papua New Guinea	2	2	3	7
4	Fiji*	1	2	3	6
5	Tonga	1	0	0	1
6	Vanuatu	0	2	0	2
7	Cook Islands	0	1	0	1
8	Nauru	0	0	1	1
8	Samoa	0	0	1	1
8	Solomon Islands	0	0	1	1
Totals (10 entries)		45	44	42	131

== Participating teams ==
Nineteen Oceania Athletics member federations participated in the championships. Marshall Islands and the 3 associate member federations of New Caledonia, Niue and Wallis and Futuna were absent. New Caledonia were initially scheduled to take part, however, due to the ongoing civil unrest in the territory, they were unable to send a team.

- American Samoa (1)
- Australia (102)
  - (Northern Territory) / (Queensland) Northern Australia as "Regional Australia"
- Cook Islands
- Federated States of Micronesia
- Fiji (Host)
- French Polynesia
- Guam
- Kiribati
- Nauru
- New Zealand
- Norfolk Island
- Northern Mariana Islands
- Palau
- Papua New Guinea
- Samoa
- Solomon Islands
- Tonga
- Tuvalu
- Vanuatu
