= Matt Baxter =

New Zealand long-distance runner

Personal information
- Born: 6 August 1994 (age 32)
- Home town: New Plymouth

Sport
- Country: New Zealand
- Sport: Long-distance running
- College team: Northern Arizona University
- Club: Hoka Northern Arizona Elite

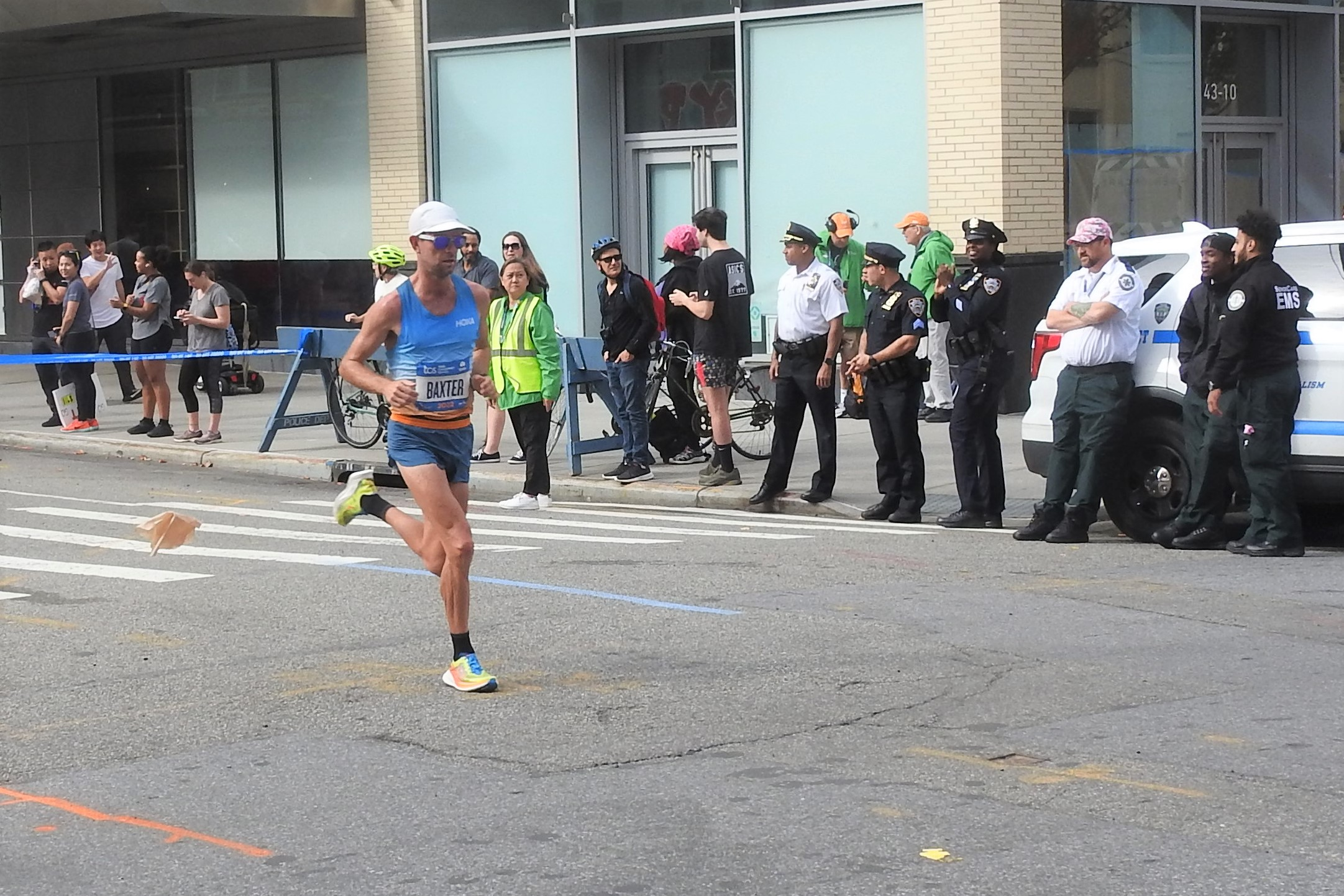
2022 New York Marathon

Matt Baxter (born 6 August 1994) is a New Zealand long-distance runner.

In 2019, he competed in the senior men's race at the 2019 IAAF World Cross Country Championships held in Aarhus, Denmark. He finished in 46th place.

== Early career ==
Baxter attended New Plymouth Boys' High School in New Plymouth, New Zealand where he was born and raised. At the time of graduation he held the New Zealand High School senior track record in the 3000m.

== Collegiate career ==
Baxter ran for Northern Arizona University from 2016 to 2018. He chose NAU because of the coaching staff and the opportunity to train at altitude. Prior to running for NAU, Baxter studied at Auckland University of Technology where he competed under the guidance of Kerry Rodger. Baxter studied criminology at both institutions.

In his first season running for the NAU cross country team Baxter finished 2nd at the Big Sky XC Championships and 11th overall at the NCAA XC Championships, helping lead NAU to the first national championship in school history.

The following fall Baxter once again finished 2nd at the Big Sky XC Championships. At the NCAA XC Championships he finished 2nd overall to Syracuse runner Justyn Knight by less than half a second. The Lumberjacks also finished as national champions for the second straight year.

== Professional career ==
Baxter started running for the Hoka training group Northern Arizona Elite in 2019.

== Authorship ==
Baxters first book, Hurt Me If You Can: The Tales of a High School Runner, come out in 2019. The self-published book is an autobiographical account of Baxter figuring out running in his highs school years.

In 2023, Baxter co-authored Running Up the Mountain with former NAU XC coach Ron Mann. The book was published by Flagstaff-based Soulstice Publishing. It chronicles the start of the Lumberjacks men's cross country dynasty as well as the team's connection to the Flagstaff community.

== Results and personal records ==
All results taken from Word Athletics profile

=== Championship results ===
Year	Meet	Venue	Event	Place	Time
2010	New Zealand U17 Championships	Christchurch	3000m	3rd	8:53.26
2011	New Zealand U17 Championships	Dunedin	3000m	1st	8:30.68
2011	New Zealand U17 Championships	Dunedin	1500m	2nd	3:55.89
2011	Commonwealth Youth Games	National Sports Centre	3000m	7th	8:46.39
2013	New Zealand Athletics Championships	Auckland	5000m	5th	14:24.19
2015	New Zealand Athletics Championships	Wellington	1500m	12th	3:59.95
2015	New Zealand Athletics Championships	Wellington	5000m	7th	14:55.69
2016	NCAA XC Championships	LaVern Gibson Cross Country Course	10 km	11th	30:03.1
2017	NCAA XC Championships	E. P. "Tom" Sawyer State Park	10 km	2nd	29:00.8
2017	NCAA Indoor Championships	Gilliam Indoor Track Stadium	5000m	14th	14:08.28
2017	NCAA Outdoor Championships	Hayward Field	10,000m	7th	29:09.83
2018	NCAA Indoor Championships	Gilliam Indoor Track Stadium	3000m	11th	8:10.28
2018	NCAA Outdoor Championships	Hayward Field	10,000m	5th	28:39.35
2019	New Zealand Athletics Championships	Christchurch	14:14.65	1st	14:04.44
2019	World Cross Country Championships	Aarhus	10 km	45th	34:03
2020	New Zealand Road Running Championships	Auckland	10 km	1st	30:22
2020	New Zealand Athletics Championships	Christchurch	5000m	2nd	14:14.65
2023	World Cross Country Championships	Mount Panorama Circuit	~10 km	58th	32:22

=== Personal records ===
Surface	Event	Time	Date	Venue
Short Track	3000m	7:47.85	February 15, 2020	Boston University
Short Track	5000m	13:27.61	January 24, 2020	Boston University
Outdoor Track	10,000m	28:10.05	May 3, 2018	Palo Alto, CA
Road	Half Marathon	1:04:12	March 17, 2024	New York, NY
Road	Marathon	2:10:57	December 1, 2024	Valencia, SP
