= 2016 IAAF World U20 Championships – Women's 800 metres =

The women's 800 metres event at the 2016 IAAF World U20 Championships was held at Zdzisław Krzyszkowiak Stadium on 19, 20 and 21 July.

== Medalists ==
| Gold | Samantha Watson; United States |
| Silver | Aaliyah Miller; United States |
| Bronze | Tigist Ketema; Ethiopia |

== Records ==
Standing records prior to the 2016 IAAF World U20 Championships in Athletics
| World Junior Record | Pamela Jelimo (KEN) | 1:54.01 | Zürich, Switzerland | 29 August 2008 |
| Championship Record | Elena Mirela Lavric (ROM) | 2:00.06 | Bydgoszcz, Poland | 11 July 2008 |
| World Junior Leading | Habitam Alemu (ETH) | 1:59.14 | Doha, Qatar | 6 May 2016 |

== Results ==
=== Heats ===
Qualification: First 4 of each heat (Q) and the 4 fastest times (q) qualified for the semifinals.

| Rank | Heat | Name | Nationality | Time | Note |
|---|---|---|---|---|---|
| 1 | 2 | Tigist Ketema | Ethiopia | 2:05.51 | Q |
| 2 | 2 | Josephine Kiplangat | Kenya | 2:05.69 | Q |
| 3 | 2 | Sarah Billings | Australia | 2:06.13 | Q |
| 4 | 1 | Marta Hirpato | Bahrain | 2:06.21 | Q |
| 5 | 1 | Foziya Niguse | Ethiopia | 2:06.25 | Q |
| 6 | 2 | Jazz Shukla | Canada | 2:06.59 | Q, PB |
| 7 | 2 | Abitha Mary Manuel | India | 2:06.91 | q, PB |
| 8 | 4 | Samantha Watson | United States | 2:07.30 | Q |
| 9 | 4 | Elise Vanderelst | Belgium | 2:07.70 | Q |
| 10 | 4 | Mareen Kalis | Germany | 2:07.95 | Q |
| 11 | 3 | Alison Andrews-Paul | New Zealand | 2:08.13 | Q |
| 12 | 1 | Adrianna Czapla | Poland | 2:08.16 | Q |
| 13 | 1 | Aaliyah Miller | United States | 2:08.21 | Q |
| 14 | 2 | Nataliya Pyrozhenko | Ukraine | 2:08.31 | q |
| 15 | 1 | Carla Sweeney | Ireland | 2:08.41 | q |
| 16 | 3 | Arletis Thaureaux | Cuba | 2:08.44 | Q |
| 17 | 3 | Victoria Tachinski | Canada | 2:08.48 | Q |
| 18 | 3 | Alina Ammann | Germany | 2:08.63 | Q |
| 19 | 1 | Saija Seppä | Finland | 2:08.94 | q |
| 20 | 3 | Lilyana Georgieva | Bulgaria | 2:09.28 | |
| 21 | 4 | Salomé Afonso | Portugal | 2:09.43 | Q |
| 22 | 4 | Georgia Hansen | Australia | 2:09.51 | |
| 23 | 3 | Oliwia Pakuła | Poland | 2:09.53 | |
| 24 | 2 | Vendula Hluchá | Czech Republic | 2:09.64 | |
| 25 | 3 | Amalie Sæten | Norway | 2:09.67 | |
| 26 | 5 | Betty Chepkemoi Sigei | Kenya | 2:10.96 | Q |
| 27 | 5 | Louise Shanahan | Ireland | 2:11.00 | Q |
| 28 | 5 | Esther Chebet | Uganda | 2:11.18 | Q |
| 29 | 1 | Jarly Marín | Colombia | 2:11.42 | |
| 30 | 5 | Johana Arrieta | Colombia | 2:11.72 | Q |
| 31 | 5 | Arina Kleshchukova | Kyrgyzstan | 2:11.98 | |
| 32 | 4 | Honorine Iribagiza | Rwanda | 2:12.30 | |
| 33 | 5 | Elena Bellò | Italy | 2:13.05 | |
| 34 | 5 | Lili Das | India | 2:13.45 | |
| | 4 | Zorana Grujić | Serbia | DQ | R163.3(a) |
| | 3 | Aminat Alabi | Nigeria | DNS | |

=== Semifinals ===
Qualification: First 2 of each heat (Q) and the 2 fastest times (q) qualified for the final.

| Rank | Heat | Name | Nationality | Time | Note |
|---|---|---|---|---|---|
| 1 | 1 | Aaliyah Miller | United States | 2:04.36 | Q |
| 2 | 3 | Samantha Watson | United States | 2:04.50 | Q |
| 3 | 3 | Victoria Tachinski | Canada | 2:04.55 | Q |
| 4 | 2 | Marta Hirpato | Bahrain | 2:05.09 | Q |
| 5 | 1 | Tigist Ketema | Ethiopia | 2:05.13 | Q |
| 6 | 1 | Elise Vanderelst | Belgium | 2:05.32 | q |
| 7 | 2 | Mareen Kalis | Germany | 2:05.45 | Q |
| 8 | 3 | Betty Chepkemoi Sigei | Kenya | 2:05.46 | q |
| 9 | 2 | Arletis Thaureaux | Cuba | 2:05.47 | PB |
| 10 | 2 | Esther Chebet | Uganda | 2:05.47 | |
| 11 | 1 | Jazz Shukla | Canada | 2:06.24 | PB |
| 12 | 2 | Alison Andrews-Paul | New Zealand | 2:06.32 | PB |
| 13 | 3 | Foziya Niguse | Ethiopia | 2:06.84 | |
| 14 | 2 | Sarah Billings | Australia | 2:06.86 | |
| 15 | 3 | Johana Arrieta | Colombia | 2:07.18 | |
| 16 | 3 | Carla Sweeney | Ireland | 2:07.78 | |
| 17 | 3 | Saija Seppä | Finland | 2:07.91 | PB |
| 18 | 3 | Salomé Afonso | Portugal | 2:08.09 | |
| 19 | 1 | Alina Ammann | Germany | 2:08.11 | |
| 20 | 1 | Louise Shanahan | Ireland | 2:08.43 | SB |
| 21 | 1 | Nataliya Pyrozhenko | Ukraine | 2:08.44 | |
| 22 | 2 | Abitha Mary Manuel | India | 2:09.80 | |
| 23 | 2 | Josephine Kiplangat | Kenya | 2:09.98 | |
| 24 | 1 | Adrianna Czapla | Poland | 2:11.44 | |

=== Final ===
| Rank | Name | Nationality | Time | Note |
|---|---|---|---|---|
| 1st place, gold medalist(s) | Samantha Watson | United States | 2:04.52 | |
| 2nd place, silver medalist(s) | Aaliyah Miller | United States | 2:05.06 | |
| 3rd place, bronze medalist(s) | Tigist Ketema | Ethiopia | 2:05.13 | |
| 4 | Elise Vanderelst | Belgium | 2:05.82 | |
| 5 | Marta Hirpato | Bahrain | 2:06.04 | |
| 6 | Victoria Tachinski | Canada | 2:06.11 | |
| 7 | Betty Chepkemoi Sigei | Kenya | 2:06.27 | |
| 8 | Mareen Kalis | Germany | 2:06.32 | |
