= 2015 World Youth Championships in Athletics – Girls' 800 metres =

Girls' 800 metres at the 2015 World Youth Championships in Athletics
- Venue: Estadio Olímpico Pascual Guerrero
- Dates: 16, 17 and 19 July
- Competitors: 29 from 23 nations
- Winning time: 2:03.54

Medalists
gold medal	Samantha Watson	United States
silver medal	Gadese Ejara	Ethiopia
bronze medal	Marta Zenoni	Italy

The girls' 800 metres at the 2015 World Youth Championships in Athletics was held at the Estadio Olímpico Pascual Guerrero in Cali, Colombia on 16, 17 and 19 July 2015.

== Records ==
Prior to the competition, the following records were as follows.

World Youth Best	Wang Yuan (CHN)	1:57.18	Beijing, China	8 September 1993
Championship Record	Aníta Hinriksdóttir (ISL)	2:01.13	Donetsk, Ukraine	14 July 2013
World Youth Leading	Hawi Alemu (ETH)	2:01.27	Tomblaine, France	1 July 2015

== Results ==
=== Round 1 ===
First 3 in each heat (Q) and the next 4 fastest (q) advance to the semifinals.

Rank	Heat	Name	Nationality	Time	Note
1	3	Samantha Watson	United States	2:06.05	Q
2	1	Gadese Ejara	Ethiopia	2:06.26	Q
3	4	Foziya Niguse	Ethiopia	2:06.91	Q
4	1	Carys McAulay	Great Britain	2:07.74	Q
5	1	Ginelle DeMone	Canada	2:08.25	Q, PB
6	1	Arina Kleshchukova	Kyrgyzstan	2:08.72	q, PB
7	3	Oliwia Olszok	Poland	2:09.05	Q
8	1	Liza Kellerman	South Africa	2:09.49	q
9	4	Ekaterina Alekseeva	Russia	2:09.52	Q
10	2	Marta Zenoni	Italy	2:09.67	Q
11	3	Johana Arrieta	Colombia	2:09.74	Q
12	1	Mary Kalekye	Kenya	2:09.77	q, PB
13	1	Mia Mørck	Denmark	2:09.79	q, PB
14	2	Honorine Iribagiza	Rwanda	2:10.04	Q, PB
15	2	Elise Vanderelst	Belgium	2:10.20	Q
16	4	Jana Reinert	Germany	2:10.28	Q
17	2	Amanda Thomas	United States	2:10.41	
18	3	Alina Ammann	Germany	2:10.56	
19	2	Shoko Fukuda	Japan	2:10.79	
20	4	Pietra Da Silva	Brazil	2:11.00	
21	4	Betty Chepkemoi Sigei	Kenya	2:12.05	
22	4	Helene Gottlieb	Denmark	2:12.34	
23	3	Chrissani May	Jamaica	2:12.48	
24	3	Babitha Chukkanmarthodi	India	2:12.71	PB
25	2	Alyssa Mousseau	Canada	2:13.65	
26	2	Milica Golubović	Serbia	2:13.89	
27	3	Ylva Traxler	Austria	2:13.98	
28	1	Radka Škovranová	Slovakia	2:17.84	
29	4	Enlitha Ncube	Zimbabwe	2:19.39	

=== Semifinal ===
First 3 in each heat (Q) and the next 2 fastest (q) advance to the final.

Rank	Heat	Name	Nationality	Time	Note
1	2	Marta Zenoni	Italy	2:05.47	Q
2	2	Gadese Ejara	Ethiopia	2:06.24	Q
3	2	Carys McAulay	Great Britain	2:08.70	Q
4	2	Arina Kleshchukova	Kyrgyzstan	2:10.79	q
5	1	Samantha Watson	United States	2:10.89	Q
6	1	Foziya Niguse	Ethiopia	2:10.94	Q
7	2	Johana Arrieta	Colombia	2:11.02	q
8	1	Ekaterina Alekseeva	Russia	2:11.84	Q
9	1	Ginelle DeMone	Canada	2:13.21	
10	1	Mia Mørck	Denmark	2:13.44	
11	1	Mary Kalekye	Kenya	2:13.61	
12	1	Liza Kellerman	South Africa	2:14.05	
13	1	Elise Vanderelst	Belgium	2:17.03	
14	2	Jana Reinert	Germany	2:19.45	
15	2	Honorine Iribagiza	Rwanda	2:21.22	
–	2	Oliwia Olszok	Poland	DQ	

=== Final ===
Rank	Name	Nationality	Time	Note
1st place, gold medalist(s)	Samantha Watson	United States	2:03.54	PB
2nd place, silver medalist(s)	Gadese Ejara	Ethiopia	2:03.67	PB
3rd place, bronze medalist(s)	Marta Zenoni	Italy	2:04.15	
4	Carys McAulay	Great Britain	2:05.31	PB
5	Foziya Niguse	Ethiopia	2:05.32	PB
6	Ekaterina Alekseeva	Russia	2:06.32	
7	Johana Arrieta	Colombia	2:08.44	PB
8	Arina Kleshchukova	Kyrgyzstan	2:13.54	
