= 2020 New Zealand Athletics Championships =

- Dates: 6–8 March
- Host city: Christchurch
- Venue: Ngā Puna Wai Sports Hub

The 2020 New Zealand Athletics Championships was the national championship in outdoor track and field for New Zealand. It was held from 6–8 March at Ngā Puna Wai Sports Hub in Christchurch. The 10,000 metres was held separately on 21 March while the half marathon took place on 5 April.

== Results ==
=== Men ===
Event	Gold		Silver		Bronze	
100 metres	Edward Osei-Nketia	10.46 s	Hamish Gill	10.53 s	Tiaan Whelpton	10.71 s
200 metres	Edward Osei-Nketia	20.88 s	Hamish Gill	20.97 s	Cody Wilson	21.21 s
400 metres	Luke Mercieca	48.04 s	Shay Veitch	48.25 s	Liam Webb	48.56 s
800 metres	Michael Dawson	1:51.55 min	Mikael Starzynski	1:52.49 min	Dominic Devlin	1:52.97 min
1500 metres	Nick Willis	3:42.94 min	Julian Oakley	3:42.99 min	Eric Speakman	3:45.89 min
5000 metres	Hayden Wilde	14:13.86	Matt Baxter	14:14.65	Cameron Graves	14:31.10
110 m hurdles	James Sandilands	15.23 s	Matthew Aucamp	15.62 s	Jares Neighbours	15.66 s
400 m hurdles	Michael Cochrane	55.15 s	Louis Andrews	58.51 s	Justin Menezes	60.70 s
3000 m s'chase	Ieuan van der Peet	9:20.38 min	Liam Woolford	9:42.52 min	Sam Petty	9:51.23 min
4 × 100 m relay	Nick Ash; Max Attwell; Elliott Nye; Tiaan Whelpton	42.55 s	Schuyler Orr; Nathan MacDonell; Felix McDonald; Jake Paul	42.97 s	Harry Sellwood; Liam Montgomery; Cody Wilson; Matthew Rodger	43.59 s
4 × 400 m relay	Nick Ash; Louis Andrews; Max Attwell; Luke Mercieca	3:16.70 min	Josh Ledger; Josh Nairne; Rowan Blaikie; Liam Webb	3:16.96 min	John Gerber; Quin Hartley; Shay Veitch; Felix McDonald	3:23.60 min
10,000 m walk	Quentin Rew	40:42.11 min	Alexander Brown	51:42.00 min		
High jump	Hamish Kerr	2.16 m	Marcus Wolton	2.02 m	Quinn Hartley	1.97 m
Pole vault	James Steyn	5.32 m	Nicholas Southgate	5.32 m	Etienne Du Preez	5.02 m
Long jump	Felix McDonald	7.64 m w	Lewis Arthur	7.43 m w	Shay Veitch	7.38 m
Triple jump	Andrew Allan	14.66 m	Matthew Wyatt	14.48 m	Scott Thomson	14.39 m
Shot put	Tomas Walsh	21.70 m	Jacko Gill	21.07 m	Ryan Ballantyne	19.82 m
Discus throw	Alexander Parkinson	58.92 m	Connor Bell	58.75 m	Nathaniel Sulupo	52.17 m
Hammer throw	Anthony Nobilo	59.94 m	Todd Bates	51.47 m	Anthony Barmes	50.17 m
Javelin throw	Alex Wood	68.71 m	Anton Schroder	57.51 m	Ethan Walker	54.96 m
Decathlon	Max Attwell	7041 pts	Matthew Aucamp	6116 pts	Shay Veitch	6054 pts

=== Women ===
Event	Gold		Silver		Bronze	
100 metres	Zoe Hobbs	11.47 s	Rosie Elliott	11.66 s	Georgia Hulls	11.68 s
200 metres	Zoe Hobbs	23.26 s	Rosie Elliott	23.27	Georgia Hulls	23.53
400 metres	Annalies Kalma	55.29 s	Mackenzie Jeffries	55.40 s	Sophie Napper	56.63 s
800 metres	Katherine Camp	2:05.84 min	Angie Petty	2:05.89 min	Ariana Candy	2:10.05 min
1500 metres	Angie Petty	4:18.14	Kara MacDermid	4:20.31	Rebekah Greene	4:20.64
5000 metres	Rebekah Greene	16:51.66	Nynke Mulholland	17:27.18	Sarah Douglas	18:01.19
100 m hurdles	Fiona Morrison	13.62 s	Amy Robertson	14.07 s	Celine Pearn	14.37 s
400 m hurdles	Portia Bing	57.69 s	Mackenzie Jeffries	60.99 s	Celine Pearn	63.04 s
3000 m s'chase	Amanda Holyer	12:15.14				
4 × 100 m relay	Summer Rutherford; Fiona Morrison; Anna Hayward; Helena Dinnissen	48.18 s	Laura MacCulloch; Joccoaa Palmer; Leonie Palmer; Sophie Napper	48.83 s	Celine Pearn; Elena Edgar-Nemec; Angelina Zickert; Amy Robertson	48.99 s
4 × 400 m relay	Anna Hayward; Angie Petty; Katherine Camp; Ariana Candy	3:.58.16 min	Sophie Napper; Laura MacCulloch; Madaline Spence; Rosie Elliott	3:48.93 min	Kiana Hawn; Alessandra Macdonald; Kerry White; Annalies Kalma	3:49.95 min
10,000 m walk	Alana Barber	45:34.49 min	Laura Langley	49:35.36 min	Courtney Ruske	52:12.84 min
High jump	Josie Taylor	1.76 m	Josephine Reeves	1.72 m	Alice Taylor	1.72 m
Pole vault	Imogen Ayris	4.25 m	Olivia McTaggart	4.25 m	Eliza Meekings	3.35 m
Long jump	Briana Stephenson	6.08 m	Ashleigh Bennett	5.75 m w	Kayla Goodwin	5.74 m w
Triple jump	Kayla Goodwin	12.87	Sarah Cowley-Ross	12.66	Anna Thomson	12.63
Shot put	Valerie Adams	18.73 m	Maddi Wesche	17.34 m	Torie Owers	15.62 m
Discus throw	TeRina Keenan	55.35	Lauren Bruce	54.56	Tatiana Kaumoana	52.03
Hammer throw	Julia Ratcliffe	70.31 m	Lauren Bruce	63.08 m	Nicole Bradley	61.51 m
Javelin throw	Tori Peeters	57.79 m	Stephanie Wrathall	49.78 m	Jessica Senior	44.32 m
Heptathlon	Christina Ryan	4928 pts	Alessandra Macdonal	4679 pts	Hayley Marx	4479 pts
