= Pan American Youth Championships in Athletics =

Athletics competition

The Pan American Youth Athletics Championships is an Athletics event organized by the Association of Panamerican Athletics (APA) open for youth (U18) athletes from member and associate member associations. The inaugural competition took place in Cali, Colombia in 2015.

== Editions ==
	Year	City	Country	Date	Venue
1	2015	Cali	Colombia	May 30–31	Estadio Pedro Grajales

== Championships records ==
=== Boys ===
Event	Record	Athlete	Nationality	Date	Championships	Place	Ref.
100 m	10.51 (+1.9 m/s)	Marcelo Neves	Brazil	30 May 2015	2015 Championships	Cali, Colombia	
200 m	21.70 (−2.3 m/s)	Marcelo Neves	Brazil	31 May 2015	2015 Championships	Cali, Colombia	
400 m	48.28	Anthony Zambrano	Colombia	30 May 2015	2015 Championships	Cali, Colombia	
800 m							
1500 m	4:00.36	Carlos Santiago Hernández	Colombia	30 May 2015	2015 Championships	Cali, Colombia	
3000 m	9:07.47	José Zabala	Argentina	30 May 2015	2015 Championships	Cali, Colombia	
110 m hurdles							
400 m hurdles	54.08	Juan Duran	Colombia	30 May 2015	2015 Championships	Cali, Colombia	
High jump	2.15 m	Jermaine Francis	Saint Kitts and Nevis	31 May 2015	2015 Championships	Cali, Colombia	
Pole vault	4.56 m	Natán Rivera	El Salvador	30 May 2015	2015 Championships	Cali, Colombia	
Long jump	6.92 m	Juan Moreno		30 May 2015	2015 Championships	Cali, Colombia	
Triple jump	13.98 (±0.0 m/s)	Jhony Quintana	Colombia	31 May 2015	2015 Championships	Cali, Colombia	
Shot put	18.19 m	Luis Arley Cordoba	Colombia	31 May 2015	2015 Championships	Cali, Colombia	
Discus throw	50.54 m	Nilson Andres Rivas	Colombia	31 May 2015	2015 Championships	Cali, Colombia	
Hammer throw	67.46 m	Alejandro Medina	Paraguay	30 May 2015	2015 Championships	Cali, Colombia	
Javelin throw	57.43 m	Juan Paredes		31 May 2015	2015 Championships	Cali, Colombia	
10,000 m walk (track)	49:47.48	Marco Salinas	Ecuador	31 May 2015	2015 Championships	Cali, Colombia	

=== Girls ===
Event	Record	Athlete	Nationality	Date	Championships	Place	Ref.
100 m	11.88 (+1.5 m/s)	Ana Carolina Azevedo	Brazil	30 May 2015	2015 Championships	Cali, Colombia	
200 m	24.66 (−1.5 m/s)	Ana Carolina Azevedo	Brazil	31 May 2015	2015 Championships	Cali, Colombia	
400 m	57.92	Alexandra Alvarez	Ecuador	31 May 2015	2015 Championships	Cali, Colombia	
800 m	2:11.08	Johana Arrieta	Colombia	30 May 2015	2015 Championships	Cali, Colombia	
1500 m	4:37.20	Micaela Levaggi	Argentina	30 May 2015	2015 Championships	Cali, Colombia	
100 m hurdles	14.25 (+1.4 m/s)	Dayanna Liseth Ramos	Colombia	30 May 2015	2015 Championships	Cali, Colombia	
400 m hurdles	1:03.40	Genesis Caicedo	Ecuador	30 May 2015	2015 Championships	Cali, Colombia	
2000 m steeplechase	7:14.91	Camila Parra	Colombia	31 May 2015	2015 Championships	Cali, Colombia	
High jump	1.64 m	María Fernanda Murillo	Colombia	30 May 2015	2015 Championships	Cali, Colombia	
High jump	1.64 m	Giuliana Di Bartolo	Costa Rica	30 May 2015	2015 Championships	Cali, Colombia	
Pole vault	3.40 m	Yoli Gonzales		31 May 2015	2015 Championships	Cali, Colombia	
Pole vault	3.40 m	Paula Arellano		31 May 2015	2015 Championships	Cali, Colombia	
Long jump	4.86 m (+0.1 m/s)	Carolina Riascos		31 May 2015	2015 Championships	Cali, Colombia	
Triple jump	12.70 m (−0.2 m/s)	Leydi Marcela Cuesta	Colombia	30 May 2015	2015 Championships	Cali, Colombia	
Shot put							
Discus throw	42.77 m	Ailen Armada	Argentina	31 May 2015	2015 Championships	Cali, Colombia	
Hammer throw	56.56 m	Araceli Nahuel	Argentina	30 May 2015	2015 Championships	Cali, Colombia	
Javelin throw							
5000 m walk (track)	24:23.76	Lina Geraldine Bolivar	Colombia	31 May 2015	2015 Championships	Cali, Colombia	

=== Mixed ===
Event	Record	Athlete	Nationality	Date	Championships	Place	Ref.
Mixed 4 × 400 m relay	3:35.35	Johana Arrieta; Juan Duran; Damaris Palomeque; Anthony Zambrano	Colombia	31 May 2015	2015 Championships	Cali, Colombia	
