= Johana Arrieta =

Colombian middle-distance runner

Personal information
- Full name: Johana Patricia Arrieta Madera
- Born: 2 September 1998 (age 27) Montería, Colombia

Sport
- Sport: Athletics
- Event: 800 metres
- Coached by: Libardo Hoyos

Johana Patricia Arrieta Madera (born 2 September 1998 in Montería) is a Colombian middle-distance runner competing primarily in the 800 metres. She represented her country in the 800 metres at the 2017 World Championships without reaching the semifinals. In addition, she won the gold medal at the 2017 South American Championships.

== International competitions ==
Year	Competition	Venue	Position	Event	Notes
Representing Colombia
2014	South American U18 Championships	Cali, Colombia	1st	800 m	2:10.64
2015	Pan American U18 Championships	Cali, Colombia	1st	800 m	2:11.08
2015	World U18 Championships	Cali, Colombia	7th	800 m	2:08.44
2016	World U20 Championships	Bydgoszcz, Poland	15th (sf)	800 m	2:07.18
2017	IAAF World Relays	Nassau, Bahamas	3rd (B)	4 × 400 m relay	3:38.02
2017	South American U20 Championships	Leonora, Guyana	1st	800 m	2:10.41
2017	South American U20 Championships	Leonora, Guyana	2nd	4 × 400 m relay	3:52.14
2017	South American Championships	Asunción, Paraguay	1st	800 m	2:06.36
2017	Pan American U20 Championships	Trujillo, Peru	4th	800 m	2:05.39
2017	Pan American U20 Championships	Trujillo, Peru	4th	4 × 400 m relay	3:51.61
2017	World Championships	London, United Kingdom	42nd (h)	800 m	2:07.36
2017	Bolivarian Games	Santa Marta, Colombia	3rd	800 m	2:04.61
2017	Bolivarian Games	Santa Marta, Colombia	–	4 × 400 m relay	DQ
2018	South American Games	Cochabamba, Bolivia	4th	800 m	2:17.51
2018	South American U23 Championships	Cuenca, Ecuador	1st	800 m	2:09.65
2018	South American U23 Championships	Cuenca, Ecuador	1st	4 × 400 m relay	3:35.50
2019	South American Championships	Lima, Peru	3rd	800 m	2:05.91
2019	South American Championships	Lima, Peru	6th	1500 m	4:31.50
2019	Pan American Games	Lima, Peru	8th (h)	800 m	2:06.00
2022	Bolivarian Games	Valledupar, Colombia	4th	800 m	2:06.35
2022	Bolivarian Games	Valledupar, Colombia	8th	1500 m	4:34.13

== Personal bests ==
Outdoor

- 400 metres – 56.67 (Medellín 2017)
- 800 metres – 2:05.39 (Medellín 2016)
- 1500 metres – 4:35.78 (Medellín 2017)
