= Phil Wood =

New Zealand triple jumper

Phil Wood (born 29 December 1953) was a New Zealand triple jump competitor who held the national triple jump record at 16.22 m for more than 40 years until it was broken by Welrè Olivier in 2023. He won four national titles in the triple jump.

== Personal bests ==
Event	Distance	Place	Date
Triple jump	16.22m NR	Edmonton, Canada	1978

== Others named "Phil Wood" ==
- Phil Wood & Co., bicycle component manufacturer, San Jose, California
- Phil Wood, Ten Speed Press publisher
- Phil Wood, former baseball broadcaster
- Phil Wood, former BBC presenter
- Phil Wood, Canadian cinematographer
- Phil Wood MBE CSyP FSyI HonMBCI SIRM, former head of the School of Aviation and Security at Buckinghamshire New University
- Phil Wood, associate vice-president of student affairs and dean of students, McMaster University
- Phil Woods, American saxophonist
- Philip Wood, senior British Army officer
- Philip Wood, actor, Our Town (1940 film)
