= Tigist Ketema =

Ethiopian athlete

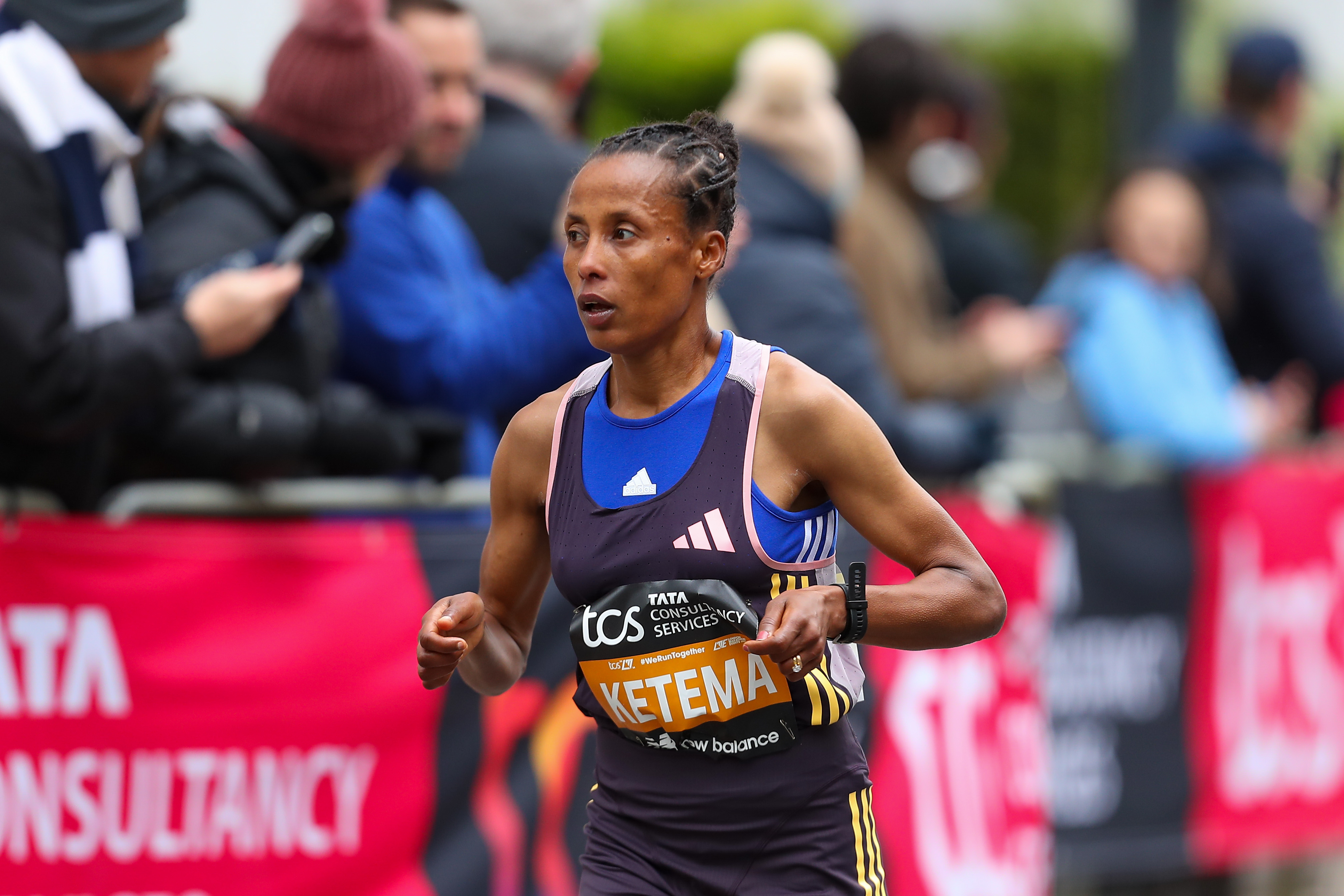
- Tigist Ketema (London Marathon 2024)

Personal information
- Full name: Tigist Ketema Tebo
- Nationality: Ethiopian
- Born: 15 September 1998 (age 27)

Sport
- Sport: Athletics
- Event(s): 800m, 1500m, 5000m

Achievements and titles
- Personal best(s): 800m: 2:02.78 (2017, Heralgo); 1500m: 4:00.91 (2021, Heralgo); 5000m: 16:10.98 (2020, Nairobi); Marathon: 2:16.07 (Dubai, 2024)
Medal record
Women's athletics
Representing Ethiopia
IAAF World U20 Championships
Bronze medal – third place	2016 Bydgoszcz	800 m
African U20 Championships
Gold medal – first place	2017 Tlemcen	800 m
World Marathon Majors
Gold medal – first place	2025 Berlin	Marathon

Tigist Ketema (born 15 September 1998) is an Ethiopian track and field athlete. In 2023, she ran the fastest ever debut marathon time by a woman.

== Career ==
Ketema was a bronze medalist at the World U20 Championships in Bydgoszcz in 2016 over 800m. She became national champion in 2016 at that distance, and in June 2017 won gold at the 2017 African U20 Championships in Athletics over 800m in Tlemcen, Algeria.

Ketema won the Great Ethiopian Run 10 km race women’s category, in Addis Ababa, in November 2022.

On 9 June 2023 she acted as a pacemaker for Faith Kipyegon as she broke the world record over 5000m at the Diamond League meeting in Paris.

On 7 January 2024 she won the 2024 Dubai Marathon, finishing the race in 2:16:07. It was the fastest ever debut marathon by a woman. In September 2024, Ketema won the Berlin Marathon with a time of 2:16:42; which is the third fastest time in the Berlin Marathon.
