= Welrè Olivier =

New Zealand athlete

Werlè Olivier
Personal information
- Nationality: New Zealand; South African
- Born: 4 November 2002 (age 24)
- Relative: Ethan Olivier (brother)

Sport
- Sport: Athletics
- Event: Triple jump

Achievements and titles
- Personal bests: Triple jump: 16.48m (Pretoria, 2024); Indoors; Triple jump: 15.59m (Lafayette, 2022)NR
Medal record
Men's athletics
Representing New Zealand
Oceania Championships
| Silver medal – second place | 2024 Suva | Triple jump |

Welrè Olivier (born 4 November 2002) is a track and field athlete. He is the New Zealand indoor record holder in the triple jump.

== Early life ==
Olivier lived in New Zealand from between the ages of nine months and seven years-of-age, before his parents returned to Vereeniging, South Africa. He and his younger brother Ethan, also a triple jumper, hold dual New Zealand and South African citizenship.

Olivier is coached by his father, Wikus, a former South African triple jump record-holder.

== Career ==
He competed collegiately for the University of North Carolina. He declared for New Zealand in 2021. On 8 January 2022, at the Gene Edmonds Invitational in West Lafayette, United States he set a New Zealand indoors record with a jump of 15.59 metres.

In February 2023, he broke the New Zealand triple jump record of 16.22m set by Phil Wood in Edmonton, Canada, in 1978, with a leap of 16.48 metres in Potchefstroom, South Africa.

In February 2024, he finished second at the International Track Meet in Christchurch. In doing so, he took the 59-year-old New Zealand resident record of Dave Norris with a wind-legal jump of 16.33m. He finished as runner-up at the 2024 New Zealand Athletics Championships in Wellington in March 2024. In June, he won the silver medal at the 2024 Oceania Athletics Championshipsin Suva, Fiji, behind Aiden Hinson of Australia.
