= Aiden Hinson =

Australian athlete (born 2003)

Personal information
- Born: 5 June 2003 (age 23)

Sport
- Sport: Athletics
- Event: Triple jump

Achievements and titles
- Personal best(s): Triple jump: 16.72m (2023); Long jump: 7.61m (2022)
Medal record
Men's athletics
Representing Australia
Oceania Championships
Gold medal – first place	2024 Suva	Triple jump
Gold medal – first place	2026 Darwin	Triple jump

Aiden Hinson (born 5 June 2003) is an Australian triple jumper. He won the gold medal at the 2024 and 2026 Oceania Athletics Championships.

== Biography ==
From Somerville, Victoria, Hinson was a successful junior, having started at Western Port Little Athletics Hastings at the under-6 level and was also part of the Dandenong Stingrays under-16 development squad. Hinson was national under-16 long jump champion in 2018. As a 16 year-old, Hinson set a new triple jump championship record at the Oceania U18 Championships in Townsville in 2019 and also broke a 30-year record at the Australian All Schools Championships in Cairns, with a 14.55m jump.

A member of the Victorian Institute of Sport, he won the men’s under-20 triple jump at the 2021 Australian Championships, and was subsequently selected for the 2021 World Athletics U20 Championships, but Australia withdrew the team because of the COVID-19 pandemic. He was also selected for the 2022 World Athletics U20 Championships in Cali, Colombia, but had to pull out through injury.

Hinson won the Australia Athletics Championships in April 2023, finishing ahead of Connor Murphy in the final of the triple jump with a best effort of 16.61 metres. That year, he moved to tenth on the Australian all-time list with a jump of 16.72 metres at the age of 19 years-old. He was selected for the Australian team to compete at the 2023 World Athletics Championships in Budapest, Hungary, but was unable to compete due to injury.

Hinson won the gold medal at the 2024 Oceania Athletics Championshipsin Suva, Fiji, jumping 16.32 metres to finish ahead of Welrè Olivier of New Zealand.

Hinson won the 2026 Athletics Championships in Sydney in April 2026. He was selected as part of the Australian team to compete at the 2026 Oceania Athletics Championships, winning the gold medal in Darwin, Northern Territory on 21 May.

== Personal life ==
Outside of his own athletics career, he is a trained strength and conditioning coach.
