= 1882 Southern Rugby Union season =

Rugby union competition in Australia

1882 Sydney Rugby Premiership
- Duration: May to August
- Teams: 18
- Premiers: Sydney University

The 1882 Southern Rugby Union season was the ninth season of the Sydney Rugby Premiership. Several clubs competed from May till August 1882. The season culminated in intercolonial matches against a touring Queensland team, and a tour to New Zealand by a team representing the Union.

== Teams ==
By the beginning of the season, the Southern Rugby Football Union had 35 clubs signed up as part of the Union. The SRFU annual report for 1882, presented at the SRFU annual general meeting in April 1883, mentioned that 12 new clubs had registered with the Union.

Club	Colour	Region	Classification	AGM	Fixtures	AR	M	W	L	D
Arfoma		City					11	8		
Balmain		Suburban	Senior							
Bathurst		Country	Senior				8	5	2	1
Burwood		Suburban	Senior				10	7	2	1
Carlton		County of Cumberland								
Glebe		City	Junior				12	8	3	1
Glenhead		City								
Goulburn		Country								
Liverpool		County of Cumberland	New							
Newcastle		Country					10	8		
Newtown		City					12	6		
Orientals							12	12	0	0
Parramatta		County of Cumberland							3	
Pyrmont		City					14	10	2	2
Randwick		Suburban	New							
Redfern		City	Senior				11	6	5	0
Rugby		Suburban					12	10		
St. Leonards		North Shore								
Union		County of Cumberland					12	8	3	1
University		City	Senior				11	10	1	0
Victoria		Country								
Wallaroo		City	Senior				12	9	3	0
Wellesley		Suburban					9	6	3	0

== Representative Games ==
=== Intercolonial Matches ===
1st New South Wales – Queensland Intercolonial Football Match

Saturday, 12 August 1882

New South Wales	4G & 4T — 1G	Queensland
Tries: Walker, Raper (4), Flynn; Goals: Creer (0/1), Macnamamee (0/2), Flynn (1/2), McLean (1/1); Drop goals: Raper, Pell		Goals: Pritchard (0/1); Drop goals: Feez

Association Ground
Attendance: 3000–4000
Referee: R. Arnold

Note: Under the rules then in place for determining the winner, the result was four goals and four tries to one goal. New South Wales' four goals comprised the two converted tries (or touch-downs) and the two drop-goals. The additional four tries were the unsuccessful conversion goal kicks for four out of the six touch-downs. Queensland failed with a penalty place kick at goal, but were successful with a drop goal.

Following their win over the Wallaroo Club on Saturday, 19 August, the Queensland team requested the opportunity to again meet a combined New South Wales side, in a return match. After consultation with the shipping company on which the Queensland team were booked to depart Sydney, arrangements were made to kick-off this second intercolonial game at 2.30 p.m., Tuesday, and convey the team to the steamer shortly after the game concluded.

2nd New South Wales – Queensland Intercolonial Football Match

Tuesday, 22 August 1882

New South Wales	2G & 4T — nil	Queensland
Tries: Raper (2), Clements (2), Tange, Thallon; Goals: Creer (1/3), Brodie (0/1), Cameron (1/2); Drop goals: Raper (0/1), Walker (0/1)

Association Ground
Attendance: 500
Referee: Mulcahey

Note: The combined New South Wales team secured six touch-downs, with two of the attempts at goal being successful, and four missed tries. A feature of the game at the time is that when a kick at goal was missed, the defending team (in this case Queensland) would have options to either run the ball into general play or touch-down in their own in-goal to obtain relief.

=== Other Matches on the Queensland tour ===
Queensland's 2nd Tour Match

Tuesday, 15 August 1882

Sydney University	1G & 4T — 1T	Queensland
Tries: Amess, Tange, Flynn, Beegling, Rygate; Goals: MacManamee (0/2), Flynn (1/3)		Tries: Townsend; Goals: Pritchard (0/2)

Association Ground
Referee: R. Arnold

Note: Under the rules then in place for determining the winner, the result was a win to University by one goal and four tries to Queensland's one try. Queensland were the first to touch-down, through Townsend, but their conversion attempt, and an earlier penalty kick for goal were missed by Pritchard. Queensland led at half-time by one try to nil. University touched-down five times in the second stanza, with the only successful kick being made by Flynn following his own touch-down.

Queensland's 3rd Tour Match

Wednesday, 16 August 1882
3.20 p.m.

County of Cumberland	1T — 1G	Queensland
Tries: Stettler; Goals: J. Byrne (0/1)		Tries: Markwell; Goals: Pritchard (1/1)

Elizabeth Farm, Parramatta
Referee: W. F. R. Burkitt

Note: Under the rules then in place for determining the winner, the result was a win to Queensland by one goal to one try. Queensland touched-down to earn their kick at goal, which was successful. The County of Cumberland team failed with their kick at goal following their one touch-down, or try.

Queensland's 4th Tour Match

Thursday, 17 August 1882

Combined Suburban Team	1T — nil	Queensland
Tries: Thallon; Goals: Cleeve (0/1)		Drop goals: Burrell (0/1)

Association Ground
Attendance: Meagre

Queensland's 5th Tour Match

Saturday, 19 August 1882

Wallaroo	nil — 1T & 1G	Queensland
		Tries: Feez, Townson; Goals: Pritchard (1/2)

Association Ground
Attendance: About 1,600
Referee: Raper

Note: Queensland beat the Wallroo club by a margin of one goal and one try to nil. For Queensland, Pritchard missed the kick following the touch-down by Feez, but was successful with the kick following a touch-down by Townson.

=== New South Wales tour of New Zealand ===
The Southern Rugby Football Union arranged for a New South Wales team to tour New Zealand, with the support of rugby union associations and the host venues. E. Raper from the University club was appointed captain and manager, with R. Thallon, of Balmain club, as secretary. The team departed Sydney on August 30, 1882.

The team comprised the following 16 players.

Player	Club
CE Hawkins	Balmain
MH Howard	Balmain
R Thallon	Balmain
H McClatchie	Burwood
C Jennings	Glenhead
NW Walker	Redfern
B Hill	St. Leonards
GC Addison	University
NC Barry	University
HM Baylis	University
W Flynn	University
JW Mann	University
EJ Raper	University
GW Graham	Wallaroo
HB Fligg	Wallaroo
GS Richmond	Wallaroo

==== Matches ====
Match reports published in New Zealand newspapers were subsequently reprinted in Sydney newspapers. For example, a report on the opening match that initially appeared in The New Zealand Herald, and was later reprinted in The Sydney Morning Herald.

Unlike Sydney's Southern Rugby Union, matches in New Zealand awarded points for goals and touchdowns. The points system in New Zealand was:

- 5 points for a goal from a try. Put another way, 5 points when the try for goal succeeds.
- 2 points for a touchdown when the attempt at goal is missed. Put another way, 2 points when the try for goal fails.
- 4 points for a goal from the field, as occurred in the 29 September match against Wellington, and twice in the 3 October match against Auckland.

Saturday, 9 September 1882
3:00 p.m.

Auckland	7–0	New South Wales
Try: 2 Briggs; Sims; Con: 1 Ryan	Reports

Auckland Domain
Attendance: 4,000 (estimate)
Referee: and Umpires:
Robinson
Cotter
McClatchie (NSW)

Saturday, 16 September 1882
3:20 p.m.

Wellington	2–14	New South Wales
Try: 1 Udy	Reports	Try: 4 Raper (2); Hawkins (2); Con: 2 Thallon (2)

Newtown Park
Attendance: 5,000 (estimate)
Referee: Dr. Collins
Umpires: Knapp (Well) & Firth (NSW)

Tuesday, 19 September 1882
2:10 p.m.

Wanganui	2–9	New South Wales
Try: 1 George Bayley	Report	Try: 3 Raper; Fligg; Flynn; Con: 1 Thallon

Newtown Park
Attendance: 1,000 to 1,500 (estimate)

Thursday, 21 September 1882

Canterbury	2–7	New South Wales
Try: 1 A Anderson	Reports	Try: 2 Hill; Thallon; Con: 1 Thallon

Lancaster Park
Attendance: 3,000 (estimate)
Referee: Hartland
Umpires: Lewin (Cant) & Parker (NSW)

Saturday, 23 September 1882

Otago	9—0	New South Wales
Try: 3 W Crawshaw; W Fowler; J Taiaroa; Con: 1 P Nicol	Reports

Mosgiel Ground
Attendance: 2,000 (estimate)
Referee: G Dixon
Umpires: Robertson (Otago) & Leuwin (NSW)

Friday, 29 September 1882
3:40 p.m.

Wellington	0–8	New South Wales
	Reports	Try: 2 Raper; Walker; Drop: 1 Flynn

Newtown Park

Tuesday, 3 October 1882

Auckland	18–4	New South Wales
Try: 4 Whiteside (2); Bindon; O'Connor; Con: 2 Ryan (2); Drop: 1 Jimmy Wood	Reports	Drop: 1 Flynn

Auckland Domain
Attendance: 2,000 to 3,000 (estimate)
Referee: W Robinson
Umpires: A Cotter (Auck) & W Sibbon (NSW)

== Other Football Codes ==
Match reports and other relevant articles in 1882 newspapers generally did not make an immediately obvious distinction between football codes. Several clubs played Australian Rules Football under the auspices, and in affiliation with, the New South Wales Football Association. In many instances, the code being reported on in newspapers could be determined by tries and touch-downs in Rugby Union and behinds in Australian Rules.

=== Australian Rules Football ===
The following New South Wales clubs played Australian rules football in the 1882 season.

Club	Colour	Region	Classification	AGM	Fixtures	AR	M	W	L	D
East Sydney		City								
Sydney		City					12	9	1	2
Northumberland (West Maitland)		Country					4	0	3	1
Our Boys (Sydney)							8	3	3	2
Petersham		Suburban								
Waratahs										

The New South Wales Football Association made arrangements for Victorian clubs Carlton and Hotham, to visit and play matches at the Association Ground in June. This proposed tour did not eventuate.

The Geelong Football Club did visit Sydney playing three of the clubs, a combined team, and Albury.

	1882 Geelong tour of New South Wales
Saturday, 9 July, 2:55 p.m.	East Sydney 0.7	def. by	Geelong 7.15	Association Ground (crowd: 300)	Report
Tuesday, 11 July, 3:00 p.m.	Sydney 1.1	def. by	Geelong 15.22	Association Ground (crowd: 500—600)	Reports
Thursday, 13 July, 2:45 p.m.	Petersham 0.2	def. by	Geelong 5.17	Association Ground	Reports
Saturday, 15 July, 3:00 p.m.	New South Wales 2.1	def. by	Geelong 6.21	Association Ground (crowd: 2000—3000)	Reports
Tuesday, 18 July	Albury United 0.2	def. by	Geelong 4.18	Albury, New South Wales	Report

=== Soccer ===
The following New South Wales clubs played English Association Football (soccer) in the 1882 season.

Club	Colour	Region	Classification	AGM	Fixtures	AR	M	W	L	D
Arcadian		City	Senior				8	7	1	0
