= Izzy Thornton-Bott =

Australian middle-distance runner (born 1998)

Personal information
- Born: 14 March 1998 (age 28)

Sport
- Sport: Athletics
- Events: Cross Country running, Middle-distance running

Achievements and titles
- Personal bests: 800m: 2:03.30 (2021); 1500m: 4:08.33 (2023); Mile: 4:32.69 (2023); 3000m: 9:17.08 (2024); 5000m: 15:38.32 (2024); 10,000m: 35:03.30 (2023); Road; Mile 4:42.90 (2026)
Medal record
Women's athletics
Representing Australia
Oceania Championships
Gold medal – first place	2026 Darwin	1500 m
Silver medal – second place	2026 Darwin	5000 m

Izzy Thornton-Bott (born 14 March 1998) is an Australian cross country and middle-distance runner.

== Biography ==
From the United Kingdom before being based in Sydney, Thornton-Bott started cross-country running at the age of five yesrs-old. She trained under the coach Ben Liddy at Central Performance Track in New South Wales, and with Dave Costello at The Right Fit PT Performance and as a member of UTS North Athletics Club. She won bronze medals in the under-20 800 metres and 1500 metres at the Australian National Junior Championships in 2017.

She attended the University of Waterloo in Canada and later studied in the United States at the University of Oregon and won on her NCAA debut in 2021 at the Bill Dellinger Invitational cross country meeting at Pine Ridge Golf Club, finishing the 6000m course in 20:04.60. Competing over 1500m at the 2023 NCAA Outdoors Championships, held in Austin, Texas in June 2023, she finished runner-up to Maia Ramsden in a time of 4:09.21. She had a top-ten finish in the individual and helped the Oregon Ducks to a second-place finish in the team event at the NCAA D1 Cross Country West Regionals in 2023.

Thornton-Bott placed third at the Australian road mile championships in Ballarat in April 2025, finishing behind Jaylah Hancock-Cameron and Lauren Ryan.

She was selected as part of the Australian team to compete at the 2026 Oceania Athletics Championships, winning the gold medal over 1500 metres in Darwin, Northern Territory on 19 May, and the silver medal behind Holly Campbell in the 5000 m later that at the championships.
