= Haftu Strintzos =

Ethiopian-born Australian long-distance runner

Personal information
- Born: 27 August 1999 (age 27) Tigray, Ethiopia

Sport
- Sport: Athletics
- Events: Marathon; Half-marathon; 10000 metres
- College team: Villanova University
- Coached by: Adam Didyk

Achievements and titles
- Personal bests: 5000 m: 13:34.41 (Melbourne 2024); 10000 m: 28:33.10 (Melbourne 2023); Road; Marathon: 2:06:20 (Gold Coast 2026) NR,AR; Half marathon: 1:00:36 (Marugame 2025); 10K run: 28:09 (Melbourne 2024)
Medal record
Men's athletics
Representing AUS
Oceania Championships
Gold medal – first place	2024 Suva	10000 m
Silver medal – second place	2024 Suva	5000 m

Haftu Strintzos (born 27 August) is an Ethiopian-born Australian long-distance runner. He broke the Australian national record in the marathon at the 2026 Gold Coast Marathon and also set a new Oceanian area record.

== Personal life ==
Haftu was born in northern Tigray in Ethiopia where he spent his early days as a shepherd, herding goats and sheep through the mountains of his local village. He lost both his parents by age six and was taken in by his maternal grandmother and aunts and uncles. In 2007 he met a Greek-Australian aid worker named Maria Strintzos who eventually asked him if he would like to be her son. He consented and she adopted him and brought him to Melbourne in 2011. He excelled in school and eventually attended Villanova University where he ran track and cross country. He graduated with a bachelor's degree in 2023 and a master's degree in 2024 both in electrical engineering.

== Career ==
Following the conclusion of his NCAA years with Villanova, Strintzos' first breakout was at the 2024 Oceania Athletics Championships where he placed first in the men's 10k and second in the men's 5k. The following year he made his marathon major debut running the Sydney Marathon in its inaugural year as a major marathon and he placed 14th.

In 2026, Haftu Strintzos won the Gold Coast Marathon running a time of 2:06:20. This time broke the Australian national record, the Oceanian area record, and the Gold Coast Marathon course record. He then went on to win the Australian Cross Country Championships which took place in Victoria Park. Later in November, he ran the 2026 New York City Marathon and placed fifth which allowed him to qualify for the 2028 Olympics which will be in Los Angeles.
