= Lucas Martin (racewalker) =

New Zealand racewalker

Personal information
- Full name: Lucas Martin
- Born: 2 June 2004 (age 22)

Sport
- Country: New Zealand
- Sport: Athletics
- Event: Racewalking
- Club: Athletics Whanganui
- Coached by: Mark Harris
Medal record
Men's track and field
Representing New Zealand
Oceania Championships
Gold medal – first place	2024 Suva	5,000m Race Walk
Silver medal – second place	2024 Suva	10,000m Race Walk

Lucas Martin (born 2 June 2004) is a New Zealand racewalker from Whanganui. He is a multiple-time national champion in track and road walking events, and the 2024 Oceania 5000m racewalk champion.

== Early life ==
Martin attended Whangaehu School, St George’s School, and Whanganui Collegiate School.

He was introduced to race walking at around age 12 after entering the walking category of the Round the Bridges Fun Run and Walk event in Whanganui, having initially planned to run the event but after bad weather decided to give the walk a go. He began specialising in race walking and cross-country running during his first year of secondary school.

He has balanced his athletics career with studying civil engineering at the University of Canterbury.

== Career ==
=== Junior career ===
At just 14 years old, Martin won the under-20 division 3,000 m race walk at the Jennian Homes New Zealand Track and Field Championships, setting a personal best of 14:03—improving his previous PB by 48 seconds. He followed this with a bronze medal in the 10,000 m walk the next day.

He continued his rise through national age-group competition. In 2020, he won the New Zealand under-18 5000 m race walk in Christchurch.

In 2021, Martin claimed the New Zealand under-20 10,000 m track walk title in Hastings.

At the 2022 New Zealand Track & Field Championships, he won the under-20 10,000 m walk in Hastings, setting further age-group marks.

In 2023, Martin captured the under-20 men's 3,000 m walk at the New Zealand championships in Wellington, continuing his progression towards senior competition.

=== Senior representation ===
At the 2023 New Zealand Track and Field Championships, Martin won the senior men's 10,000 m race walk in a time of 46:10.02.

In June 2024, Martin represented New Zealand at the 2024 Oceania Athletics Championships in Suva, Fiji, where he won the gold medal in the senior men's 5000m race walk and silver in the 10,000 m race walk.

At the 2025 Athletics New Zealand 10 km road championships, Martin placed third overall in the U20/Senior 10 km walk with a time of 48:58, finishing second among male seniors.

In April 2026, Martin represented New Zealand at the World Athletics Race Walking Team Championships in Brasília, Brazil, competing in the senior men's half marathon race walk. Martin recorded an official personal best time of 1:46:10, finishing 63rd individually in the event and as the top New Zealand finisher, ahead of compatriots Jonah Cropp and Toby O’Rorke, with the New Zealand team placing 15th in the team competition.

Later in 2026, Martin was named senior walker of the year at the Manawatū-Whanganui athletics awards, following his performance at the championships.

== Competition records ==
Year	Event	Age group	Performance	Position
2019	10,000 m walk (track)	Junior Men	51:22.82	Bronze
2019	3000 m walk (track)	U20 Men	14:03.69	Gold
2020	5 km walk (road)	Men U18	23:46	Gold
2020	3000 m walk (track)	U20 Men	13:39.11	Gold
2020	10,000 m walk (track)	U20 Men	48:24.23	Gold
2021	10,000 m walk (track)	Junior Men	49:41.14	Gold
2022	10 km walk (road)	Junior Men	49:04	Gold
2023	3000 m walk (track)	Junior Men	12:29.44	Gold
2023	10,000 m walk (track)	Senior Men	46:10.02	Gold
2024	3000 m walk (track)	Senior Men	13:04.31	Gold
2024	10,000 m walk (track)	Senior Men	48:22.34	Gold
2024	10 km walk (road)	Senior Men	47:09	Gold
2025	3000 m walk (track)	Senior Men	12:50.49	Bronze
2025	10,000 m walk (track)	Senior Men	45:52.45	Silver
2025	20 km walk (road)	Senior Men	1:39:54	Bronze
2025	10 km walk (road)	Senior Men	48:58	Silver

== Personal bests ==
- 3000 m walk (track): 12:29.44 (2023)
- 10,000 m walk (track): 45:52.45 (2025)
- 10 km walk (road): 47:09 (2024)
- 20 km walk (road): 1:39:54 (2025)
- Half Marathon walk (road): 1:46:10 (2026)
