= Holly Campbell (runner) =

Australian long-distance runner

Personal information
- Born: 27 June 1996 (age 30)

Sport
- Sport: Athletics
- Events: Cross Country running, Long-distance running
Medal record
Women's athletics
Representing Australia
Oceania Championships
| Gold medal – first place | 2026 Darwin | 5000 m |

Holly Campbell (born 27 June 1996) is an Australian long-distance and cross country runner.

== Biography ==
From Warren, New South Wales, she was later based in Dubbo. Initially a middle-distance runner, she transitioned to longer distances whilst a student in Sydney. In October 2022, she won the New South Wales state title over 3000 metres and less than six months later in February 2023, she also won the New South Wales state title over 5000 metres. She qualified for the 2023 World Cross Country Championships but suffered a broken foot leading up to the event and was unable to race. In August 2023, she represented Australia over 5000 metres at the delayed Athletics at the 2021 Summer World University Games.

Campbell placed second at the Australian Cross Country Trials in Canberra in 2025, and subsequently represented Australia the 2026 World Athletics Cross Country Championships, placing 44th overall. She was selected as part of the Australian team to compete at the 2026 Oceania Athletics Championships, winning the gold medal over 5000 metres in Darwin, Northern Territory on 22 May, ahead of Izzy Thornton-Bott. In October, Campbell won the Australian 10km Road Running Championships in Tasmania, finishing in a time of 32:58 ahead of Linden Hall.

== Personal life ==
Campbell has a twin sister, Paige, who also ran competively as a distance runner, before later training as a physiotherapist.
