= 2026 Oceania Athletics Championships =

- Dates: 18–22 May
- Host city: Darwin, Northern Territory, Australia
- Venue: Arafura Stadium
- Level: Senior
- Type: Outdoor
- Events: 35
- Participation: 23 (expected) nations

The 2026 Oceania Athletics Championships, will be the 18th regional athletics competition for athletes of the Oceania region. The event is due to be staged in Darwin, Northern Territory, Australia from 18 to 22 May 2026. This will also be the eighth time Australia will host the Championships. Five events – the pole vault, decathlon, heptathlon, 10,000 metres and 10,000 metres walk – will not be contested at this years championships. OAA has announced a separate Championships will be conducted at a different venue and time.

The Championships will be held concurrently with the U18, U20, Para, Age Group (formerly Masters), and the U16 Championships.

== Event schedule ==
The first draft schedule was published in December 2025.

Legend
Key	P	Q	H	½	F
Value	Preliminary round	Qualifiers	Heats	Semifinals	Final

M = morning session, E = evening session

Men
Date	May 18		May 19	May 20		May 21		May 22
Event	M	E	E	E		E		E
100 m		P	H	½	F			
200 m				H		½	F	
400 m	H		F					
800 m				H		F		
1500 m		H	F					
5000 m								F
110 m hurdles						H	F	
400 m hurdles				H				F
3000 m steeplechase				F				
High jump				F				
Long jump		F						
Triple jump						F		
Shot put			F					
Discus throw				F				
Javelin throw						F		
Hammer throw	F							
4 × 100 m relay								F

Women
Date	May 18		May 19		May 20	May 21		May 22
Event	M	E	E		E	E		E
100 m		H	½	F				
200 m					H	½	F	
400 m	H		F					
800 m					H	F		
1500 m		H	F					
5000 m								F
100 m hurdles						H	F	
400 m hurdles					H			F
3000 m steeplechase					F			
High jump			F					
Long jump						F		
Triple jump								F
Shot put								F
Discus throw			F					
Javelin throw		F						
Hammer throw					F			
4 × 100 m relay								F

Mixed
Date	May 22
Event	E
4 × 400 m relay	F

== Medal table ==
* Host nation (Australia)

Rank	Nation	Gold	Silver	Bronze	Total
1	Australia*	25	27	21	73
2	New Zealand	12	6	8	26
3	Tonga	0	1	2	3
4	French Polynesia	0	1	1	2
4	Papua New Guinea	0	1	1	2
6	Guam	0	0	1	1
6	Samoa	0	0	1	1
Totals (7 entries)		37	36	35	108

== Medal summary ==
=== Men ===
Event	Gold		Silver		Bronze	
100 metres wind: -1.0 m/s	Joshua Azzopardi; Australia	10.21	Jackson Rowe; Australia	10.26	Tiaan Whelpton; New Zealand	10.30
200 metres wind: +0.6 m/s	Aidan Murphy; Australia	20.05 CR	Christopher Ius; Australia	20.68	Tommy Te Puni; New Zealand	20.84
400 metres	Aidan Murphy; Australia	44.44 CR	Tom Reynolds; Australia	44.69	Luke van Ratingen; Australia	45.04
800 metres	Luke Boyes; Australia	1:46.83	DeGras Amekata; Australia	1:49.94	Tyler Gridley; Australia	1:50.13
1500 metres	Ben Bidois; New Zealand	4:00.91	Jake Lomas; New Zealand	4:01.31	Kiran Tibballs; Australia	4:01.37
5000 metres	Toby Gualter; New Zealand	14:29.83	Thomas Richards; New Zealand	14:54.57	Toby Tasker; New Zealand	15:19.79
4 × 100 metres relay	New Zealand (NZL); Tiaan Whelpton; Hayato Yoneto; Shay Veitch; Rylan Noome	39.64	Papua New Guinea (PNG); Pais Wisil; Tovetuna Tuna; Leroy Kamau; Daniel Baul	40.17 NR	Tonga (TGA); Fotu Pailate; Titali Kolomalu; Rodney Naniseni; Petelo Naniseni	42.08 SB
110 metres hurdles wind: +1.2 m/s	Mitchell Lightfoot; Australia	13.61	Sam Hurwood; Australia	13.65	Austin Little; Australia	13.72
400 metres hurdles	Matthew Hunt; Australia	49.77	Kyle Bennett; Australia	50.18	Daniel Baul; Papua New Guinea	53.93
3000 metres steeplechase	Toby Tasker; New Zealand	9:08.84	Padraig Heffernan; Australia	9:24.97	Jared Monk; New Zealand	9:30.26
5000 metres walk	Ari Bennett; New Zealand	24:04.46	Alex Bradley; Australia	24:30.07		
High jump	Yual Reath; Australia	2.28 m	Roman Anastasios; Australia	2.20 m	Brandon Starc; Australia	2.15 m
Long jump	Alex Epitropakis; Australia	7.91 m (+0.5 m/s)	Jalen Rucker; Australia	7.83 m (+0.7 m/s)	Shay Veitch; New Zealand	7.41 m (+0.9 m/s)
Triple jump	Aiden Hinson; Australia	16.25 m (−1.1 m/s)	Awan Akuen; Australia	16.18 m (+0.2 m/s)	Shemaiah James; Australia	15.96 m (+1.5 m/s)
Shot put	Jacko Gill; New Zealand	19.97 m	Nick Palmer; New Zealand	19.85 m	Aiden Harvey; Australia	18.46 m
Discus throw	Darcy Miller; Australia	56.88 m	Daniel di Giandomenico; Australia	51.67 m	Nathaniel Sulupo; Samoa	47.87 m
Javelin throw	Cameron McEntyre; Australia	80.53 m CR	Oscar Sullivan; Australia	78.07 m	Howard McDonald; Australia	76.13 m
Hammer throw	Timothy Heyes; Australia	65.69 m	Damian Wells; Australia	61.16 m	Ben Roberts; Australia	60.20 m
WR world record | AR area record | CR championship record | GR games record | NR national record | OR Olympic record | PB personal best | SB season best | WL world leading (in a given season)

* Indicates the athletes only competed in the preliminary heats and received medals

=== Women ===
Event	Gold		Silver		Bronze	
100 metres wind: +0.9 m/s	Zoe Hobbs; New Zealand	11.00 CR	Ebony Lane; Australia	11.32	Georgia Harris; Australia	11.39 SB
200 metres wind: +1.4 m/s	Mia Gross; Australia	23.20	Lakara Stallan; Australia	23.55	Kendra Scally-Tu'i; New Zealand	24.06 SB
400 metres	Ellie Beer; Australia	51.99 SB	Mia Gross; Australia	52.25	Alice Dixon; Australia	52.62 PB
800 metres	Holly Rule; New Zealand	2:04.43 PB	Victoria Cholsh; Australia	2:07.54 PB	Ashley Pernecker; Australia	2:07.78 PB
1500 metres	Izzy Thornton-Bott; Australia	4:27.88	Caitlyn Marx; New Zealand	4:39.78	Aiva Pinches; Australia	4:40.37 PB
5000 metres	Holly Campbell; Australia	16:27.01	Izzy Thornton-Bott; Australia	16:42.84	Eva Pringle; New Zealand	16:59.51
4 × 100 metres relay	New Zealand (NZL); Kendra Scally-Tu'i; Madison Earley; Samantha Lathwood; Eden Moyle	46.32	French Polynesia (PYF); Kyara Garbutt; Hinavai Janicaud; Mihivai Atrewe; Amy Valet	48.37	Tonga (TGA); Angelina Tupou; Tiulipe Tali; Ofa Tuifua; Tiueti Lauhingoa	50.67
100 metres hurdles wind: +1.1 m/s	Michelle Jenneke; Australia	12.87	Emily Britton; Australia	13.11	Danielle Shaw; Australia	13.51
400 metres hurdles	Sarah Carli; Australia	55.33	Alanah Yukich; Australia	56.12	Marli Wilkinson; Australia	58.88
3000 metres steeplechase	Brielle Erbacher; Australia	10:06.00	Eva Pringle; New Zealand	10:33.03	Amandine Matera; French Polynesia	11:27.63 PB
5000 metres walk	Milly Sharpe; Australia	26:03.11				
High jump	Izobelle Louison-Roe; Australia	1.85 m	Vanessa Apel; Australia	1.80 m	Imogen Skelton; New Zealand	1.80 m
Long jump	Brooke Buschkuehl; Australia	6.70 m CR	Delta Amidzovski; Australia	6.69 m	Eleanor Cooney Hunt; Australia	6.35 m
Triple jump	Desleigh Owusu; Australia	13.64 m SB	Izobelle Louison-Roe; Australia	13.32 m	Tiana Boras; Australia	13.30 m
Shot put	Emma Berg; Australia	16.16 m	ʻAta Maama Tuutafaiva; Tonga	15.70 m SB	Xylavene Beale; Australia	15.69 m
Discus throw	Taryn Gollshewsky; Australia	57.54 m	Tatiana Kaumoana; New Zealand	57.41 m	Ashlyn Blackstock; Australia	55.31 m
Javelin throw	Tori Moorby; New Zealand	60.40 m SB	Mackenzie Little; Australia	60.18 m SB	Lianna Davidson; Australia	59.66 m
Hammer throw	Lauren Bruce; New Zealand	70.64 m	Stephanie Ratcliffe; Australia	68.12 m SB	Lauren Clark; Australia	61.02 m
WR world record | AR area record | CR championship record | GR games record | NR national record | OR Olympic record | PB personal best | SB season best | WL world leading (in a given season)

* Indicates the athletes only competed in the preliminary heats and received medals

=== Mixed ===
Event	Gold		Silver		Bronze	
4 × 400 metres relay	New Zealand (NZL); Lex Revell-Lewis; Jordyn Blake; Tommy Te Puni; Holly Rule	3:19.39 CR,NR	Australia (AUS); Damon-Leigh Salafia; Bronte Bellot; Logan Penman; Ella Penman	3:38.73	Guam (GUM); Braden Flinn; Hazel Wilson; Jeofry Limtiaco; Aleah-Rae Castro	3:47.67 NR

== Participating nations ==
All 20 member federations of the Oceania Athletics Association as well as the 3 associate members are expected to participate. As in previous championships, Regional Australia, an invitational team from Northern Australia composed of rural-based athletes (particularly from North Queensland and Northern Territory) are also expected to compete.

- American Samoa (1)
- Australia (88) (Host)
- Cook Islands (6)
- Federated States of Micronesia (3)
- Fiji (7)
- French Polynesia (3)
- Guam (9)
- Kiribati
- Marshall Islands (1)
- Nauru (6)
- New Caledonia
- New Zealand (82)
- Niue
- Norfolk Island (1)
- Northern Mariana Islands (3)
- Palau (2)
- Papua New Guinea (13)
- Samoa (11)
- Solomon Islands
- Tonga
- Tuvalu
- Vanuatu (6)
- Wallis and Futuna

Invitational teams

- Hawaii
- (Northern Territory) / (Queensland) Regional Australia (27)
