= Imogen Skelton =

New Zealand athlete (born 2000)

Personal information
- Born: 15 October 2000 (age 26)

Sport
- Country: New Zealand
- Sport: Athletics
- Event: High jump

Achievements and titles
- National finals: High jump champion (2024, 2025, 2026)
- Personal bests: High jump: 1.88m (Hamilton, 2026)
Medal record
Women's athletics
Representing New Zealand
Oceania Championships
Silver medal – second place	2026 Darwin	High jump
Silver medal – second place	2024 Suva	High jump
Commonwealth Youth Games
Bronze medal – third place	2017 Bahamas	High jump

Imogen Skelton (born 15 October 2000) is a high jumper. She won the New Zealand national title in the high jump in 2024, 2025 and 2026.

== Early life ==
Skelton started athletics in primary school and joined Wellington Harriers Athletics Club when she was ten years-old. She attended Samuel Marsden Collegiate School in Wellington and was the New Zealand Secondary Schools junior girls high jump champion. She was named athlete of the year at the 2017 College Sports Wellington (CSW) Awards.

== Career ==
Skelton won the New Zealand U18 National High Jump title, came 2nd in the U20s at the same competition, in Dunedin in March 2016. The following year she placed third at the 2017 Commonwealth Youth Games in the Bahamas.

In March 2022 at the New Zealand Track & Field Championships in Hastings she cleared a new personal best height of 1.86 metres in finishing second behind Keeley O’Hagan.

Skelton won the high jump at Whanganui’s Cooks Classic in January 2024, with a clearance of 1.80 metres. In February, she set a new personal best of 1.87 metres at the International Track Meet in Christchurch. In March, she won the 2024 New Zealand Athletics Championship high jump competition with a clearance of 1.85 metres. In June 2024, she was a silver medalist in the high jump at the 2024 Oceania Athletics Championships in Suva, Fiji with 1.83 metres.

Skelton won the high jump title at the 2025 New Zealand Athletics Championships in Dunedin, clearing 1.81 metres.

On 14 February 2026, Skelton attained a new personal best jump of 1.88 metres at the Porritt Classic in Hamilton. Skelton retained her title at the 2026 New Zealand Athletics Championships in Auckland, with a best jump of 1.81 metres. In May, Skelton was runner-up to Izobelle Louison-Roe with 1.80 metres at the 2026 Oceania Athletics Championships in Darwin.

== Personal life ==
Skelton attended the University of Auckland.
