= Tiaan Whelpton =

New Zealand athlete

Personal information
- Born: 29 March 2000 (age 26) Cape Town, New Zealand

Sport
- Sport: Athletics
- Events: 60m, 100m
- Coached by: Terry Lomax

Achievements and titles
- National finals: 100 m champion (2023, 2024, 2025, 2026)
- Personal bests: Indoors: 60m 6.58 NR (2026); Outdoors: 60m: 6.50 (+1.6 m/s) (2025); 100m: 10.10 (2025); 200m: 21.28 (2021); Triple J: 14.07m (2019)
Medal record
Men's athletics
Representing New Zealand
Oceania Championships
Bronze medal – third place	2026 Darwin	100 m

Tiaan Whelpton (born 29 March 2000) is a track and field athlete who represents New Zealand as a sprinter. In 2023, he became New Zealand national champion over 100 metres for the first time, going on to win the title multiple-times. In 2026, he set a New Zealand indoor national record in the 60 metres.

== Early life ==
Born and raised in Cape Town, South Africa, his focus was on rugby union before switching entirely to track and field in his final year of high school in 2018. He moved with his family to Christchurch, New Zealand in 2019.

== Career ==
In 2019 Whelpton decided to focus on the 100m over the triple jump in which he has also excelled at high school. In 2019 he went on to win the New Zealand national under-20 title. He runs for Christchurch Old Boys United. In January 2022 at the Potts Classic he set a personal best 100m time of 10.18 to equal the New Zealand resident record of Joseph Millar, set in 2017. Whelpton equalled it again at the same event in January 2023.

In March 2023, Whelpton won the 100m title at the 2023 New Zealand Track and Field Championships held in Wellington. In May 2023, racing in Yokohama, he lowered his 100m personal best to 10.14 s (+0.4w). He equalled that 6 weeks later in La Chaux-de-Fonds, Switzerland. He represented New Zealand in the 100 metres at the 2023 World Athletics Championships held in Budapest, Hungary.

Whelpton competed in the 2024 World Athletics Indoor Championships – Men's 60 metres race and ran a seasons best time of 6.67 seconds.

On 25 January 2025 Whelpton set a new 60m personal best, and 2025 World Athletics Indoor Championships qualifying mark, of 6.50 s (+1. m/s) in finishing second at the ACT Open Athletics championships in Canberra, Australia. This time was superior to the indoor New Zealand 60m record of 6.59 s held by Augustine Nketia, but despite media reports to the contrary, it was not eligible as a New Zealand record as Athletics New Zealand does not recognise the 60m as an outdoor record event, nor does it allow indoor records to be set outdoors. At the 2025 World Athletics Indoor Championships in Nanjing in March 2025, he reached the semi-finals of the 60 metres after finishing second in his heat in 6.62 seconds.

On 7 March 2026, Whelpton won the men’s 100m final at the New Zealand Championships in a time of 10.24 seconds into a head wind. That month, he ran 6.58 seconds for the 60 metres to reach the semi-finals at the 2026 World Athletics Indoor Championships in Poland. The time beat the previous New Zealand indoors 60 m record, held by Gus Nketia since 1995 by 0.01 second. In the semi-finals he ran 6.66 seconds. He was selected for the 2026 World Athletics Relays in Gaborone, Botswana in May 2026. Later that month, he won the bronze medal in the 100 m at the 2026 Oceania Athletics Championships in Darwin, Australia, running 10.30 seconds into a headwind (-1.0).
