= Laura Nagel =

New Zealand athlete (born 1992)

Personal information
- Born: 11 February 1992 (age 34)

Sport
- Country: New Zealand
- Sport: Athletics
- Event(s): Middle-distance, long-distance running
- Coached by: Paul Hamblyn

Achievements and titles
- National finals: 1500 m champion (2022, 2023, 2025); 3000 m champion (2017, 2022, 2023, 2025); 5000 m champion (2017, 2022, 2023, 2025, 2026)
- Personal best(s): 800 m: 2:04.27 (Schifflange, 2024); 1500 m: 4:06.31 (Dublin, 2024); Mile: 4:33.59 (Whanganui, 2024); 3000 m: 8:59.05 (Cork, 2024); 5000 m: 15:35.05 (Portland, 2024)
Medal record
Women's athletics
Representing New Zealand
Oceania Championships
Gold medal – first place	2024 Suva	1500 m

Laura Nagel (born 11 February 1992) is a New Zealand middle- and long-distance runner. She won gold at the 2024 Oceania Athletics Championships in the 1500 metres.

== Early life ==
From Hawkes Bay, Nagel attended Taradale High School. She started running as a keep-fit measure and ended up breaking school athletics records.

== NCAA ==
Nagel competed at the 2010 World Athletics Junior Championships, and in the American college system for Providence College in Rhode Island, where she was co-captain of the cross-country team which won the NCAA title, but her progress was halted by significant illnes, injuries and surgery. She later returned to New Zealand and joined the athletes coached by Paul Hamblyn. Laura Nagel is a 5-time All-American distance runner, 3-time Big East Conference champion, 7-time All-Big East Conference medalist, and IC4A/ECAC Champion.

representing Providence Friars
2015	2015 NCAA Division I Outdoor Track and Field Championships	10,000 meters	34:31.08	16th
2015	Big East Conference Outdoor Track and Field Championships	10,000 meters	34:33.15	(bronze) 3rd
2015	Big East Conference Outdoor Track and Field Championships	4x800 meters	8:42.24	(silver) 2nd
2015	Eastern College Athletic Conference Indoor Track and Field Championships	Mile	4:47.39	(silver) 2nd
2015	Big East Conference Indoor Track and Field Championships	3,000 meters	9:09.16	4th
2015	Big East Conference Indoor Track and Field Championships	Distance Medley Relay	11:28.54	(silver) 2nd
2014	2014 NCAA Division I Outdoor Track and Field Championships	5,000 meters	16:09.98	11th
2014	Big East Conference Outdoor Track and Field Championships	5,000 meters	16:23.35	(gold) 1st
2014	2014 NCAA Division I Indoor Track and Field Championships	3,000 meters	9:37.84	13th
2014	Big East Conference Indoor Track and Field Championships	3,000 meters	9:07.26	(gold) 1st
2014	Big East Conference Indoor Track and Field Championships	5000 meters	16:08.34	(silver) 2nd
2013	2013 NCAA Division I Cross Country Championships	6,000 meters	20:38.8	27th
2013	Big East Conference Cross Country Championships	6,000 meters	20:21.0	4th
2013	2013 NCAA Division I Outdoor Track and Field Championships	5,000 meters	16:15.08	12th
2013	Big East Conference Outdoor Track and Field Championships	5,000 meters	16:25.28	(gold) 1st
2013	IC4A/Eastern College Athletic Conference Indoor Track and Field Championships	Distance Medley Relay	11:30.75	(gold) 1st
2013	Big East Conference Indoor Track and Field Championships	3,000 meters	9:25.01	4th
2013	Big East Conference Indoor Track and Field Championships	Distance Medley Relay	11:21.02	6th
2012	2012 NCAA Division I Cross Country Championships	6,000 meters	20:12.5	35th
2012	Big East Conference Cross Country Championships	6,000 meters	21:17.8	11th
2012	Big East Conference Outdoor Track and Field Championships	5,000 meters	16:25.81	(silver) 2nd
2011	2011 NCAA Division I Outdoor Track and Field Championships	1500 meters	4:32.44	76th
2011	IC4A/Eastern College Athletic Conference Outdoor Track and Field Championships	3000 meters	9:25.78	(silver) 2nd
2011	Big East Conference Outdoor Track and Field Championships	1500 meters	4:29.86	11th
2011	Big East Conference Outdoor Track and Field Championships	4x800 meters	9:06.97	6th
2011	Big East Conference Indoor Track and Field Championships	4x800 meters	9:06.97	6th
2011	Big East Conference Indoor Track and Field Championships	1500 meters	4:29.86	11th

== Career ==
In 2022, she set new personal best times in the 1500 metres, mile run and 3000 metres.

Nagel won the 2023 New Zealand Athletics Championships title over 1500 metres and 5000 metres in Wellington in March 2023.

Nagel won the senior women’s road mile championship in a national record time of 4:46.78 at the Novotel Lakefront Mile in Rotorua in May 2024. That month, she also won the New Zealand 5 km Road Championships. She won the gold medal in the 1500 metres at the 2024 Oceania Athletics Championships in Suva, Fiji, in June 2024.

Nagel won New Zealand national titles over 1500 metres and 5000 metres in 2025. In March 2025, she was named in the New Zealand team for the 2025 World Athletics Indoor Championships in Nanjing.

Bagel won the 5000 metres at the 2026 New Zealand Athletics Championships in Auckland, running 16:39.98.

== Personal life ==
In 2022, Nagel worked as the digital and events manager for Hockey New Zealand. She also organises athletics race events such as the Daikin Night of 5s in New Zealand.
