= Carys McAulay =

Scottish athlete (born 1998)

Personal information
- Born: 18 January 1998 (age 28) Rutherglen, Scotland

Sport
- Country: Great Britain
- Sport: Athletics
- Event: 400 metres

Achievements and titles
- Personal bests: 100 m: 12.32 (Manchester 2021); 200 m: 24.23 (Loughborough 2022); 400 m: 51.57 (Geneva 2022)

Carys McAulay (born 18 January 1998) is a Scottish track and field athlete who mainly competes in the 400 metres.

== Early life ==
McAulay was born in Rutherglen on 18 January 1998. She moved to England and attended Bridgewater High School and Priestley College in Warrington, where she ran for Warrington Athletics Club.

== Career ==
McAulay competed in the 800 metres at the 2015 World Youth Championships in Athletics in Cali, Colombia. She finished fourth running a time of 2:05.3. That year she was also selected for the Commonwealth Youth Games held in Apia, Samoa, where she won the silver medal for Scotland for the event.

After a change to Trafford Athletics Club and committing to the shorter 400 metres distance, McAulay set a new personal best of 51.57 s over the distance in Geneva in June 2022 to put her third in the Scottish rankings for that year. She was selected to run for Scotland at the Birmingham Commonwealth Games. However, she was forced to pull-out with injury during the championships as her teammates ran for the bronze medal in the women's 4 x 400 m relay.

McAulay ran an indoor personal best of 52.98 s in the 400 m to finish third at the 2023 British Indoor Championships in February, one of ten Scottish medalists at the championships. She was subsequently selected for the Great Britain squad at the European Indoor Championships held in Istanbul. It was the first British senior selection for McAulay. She was selected for the British team for the 2023 European Athletics Team Championships held in Chorzów, Silesia, Poland between 20 and 25 June 2023.

Competing at the British Athletics Championships in July 2023 in Manchester, she reached the final of the women's 400m and finished in 7th place.
