= Newtown Park =

Stadium in Wellington, New Zealand

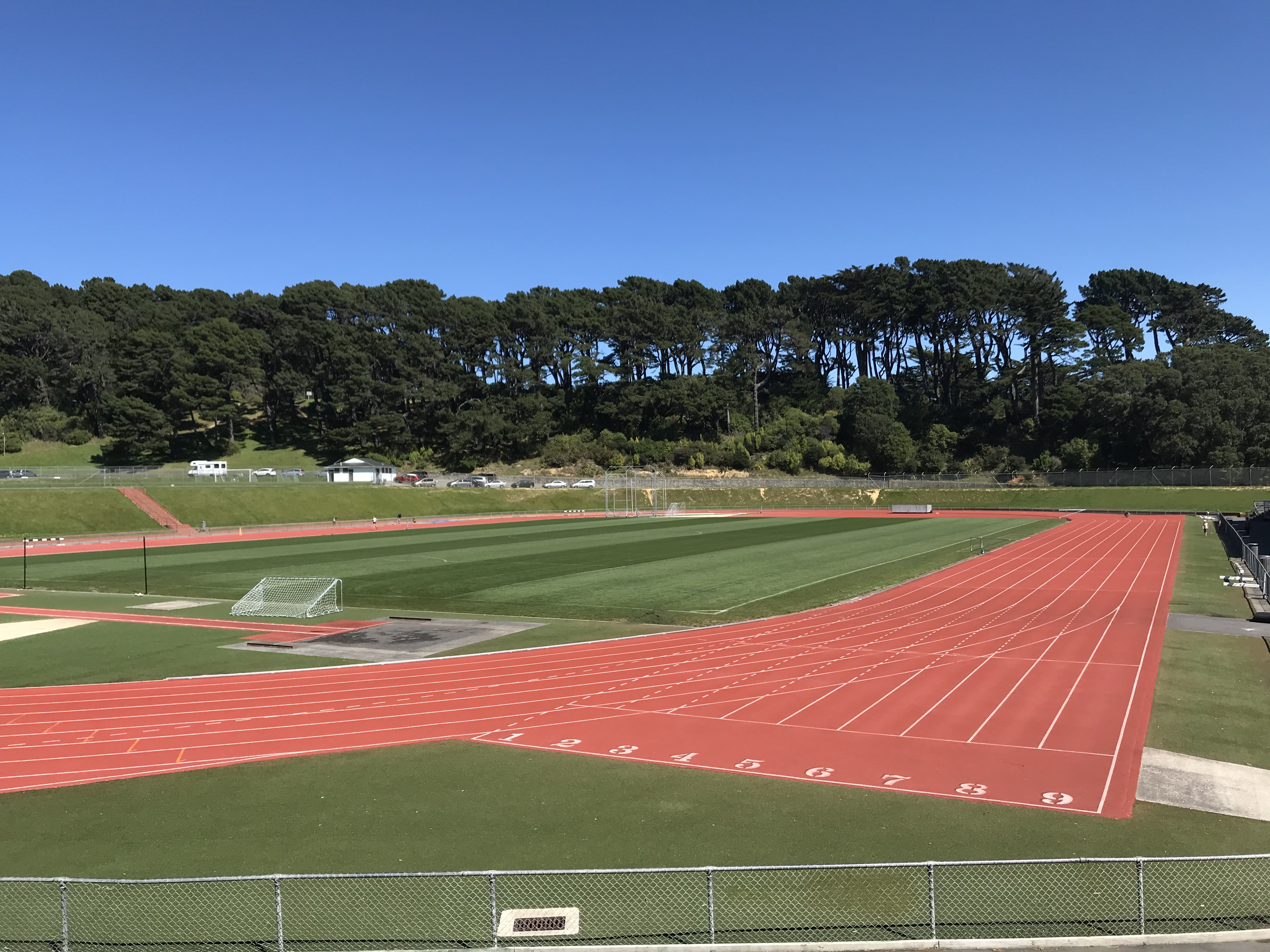
- Interactive map of Newtown Park
- Location: Newtown, Wellington, New Zealand
- Coordinates: 41°19′13″S 174°46′57″E
- Owner: Wellington City Council
- Operator: Wellington City Council
- Capacity: 5,000
- Surface: Grass field, Rekortan athletics track

Construction
- Opened: 1881
- Renovated: 2008

Tenants
- Athletics Wellington; Kiwi Amateur Athletic Club; Wellington United

Newtown Park is a multi-purpose stadium in Wellington, New Zealand, owned and managed by Wellington City Council. It is used for football (soccer) matches in winter, and track and field athletics in summer. Newtown Park is the main venue for track and field athletics in the Wellington region.

The city council grants priority to the Wellington United football club for weekend bookings during the winter season, and priority to Athletics Wellington for weekend bookings during the summer season, and for weekdays outside of school hours.

The main arena has a grass pitch (Newtown Park 1) surrounded by a 400-metre, all-weather athletics track, as well as a grandstand and a function room. A second, rectangular pitch (Newtown Park 2) is located to the south of the main arena.

== History ==
Newtown Park was built in 1881 and was originally part of Wellington Zoo. The first match played there was an international rugby game in 1882 where New South Wales beat Wellington 14–2, drawing 5,000 spectators including then Governor Sir James Prendergast. It was the main ground for rugby in Wellington until Athletic Park was opened in 1896. Newtown Park was used to house New Zealand troops before they departed for the Boer War, World War I and World War II.

Newtown Park has also been used by the Wellington rugby league team and the New Zealand Kiwis for games against visiting international teams. It was first used in 1913 when the visiting Australian's from New South Wales defeated Wellington 34–18 in front of 10,000 fans. After numerous games, Wellington last used Newtown Park in 1939.

Prior to the establishment of an athletics track at Newtown Park, regional track and field meets had been held at Evans Bay. After delays caused by unsuitable weather, an all-weather athletics track was installed at Newtown Park ready for the 1972-73 summer season. The official opening of the new track was held on Saturday 28 October 1972 with Olympic medallist Rod Dixon winning the invitation 1500 m and 3000 m events. In 1978, athletes competing in the National Championships at the stadium complained that the bituminous surface was too hard.

The #1 football pitch was re-developed in 2011 to function as a training venue for teams competing in the 2011 Rugby World Cup. During the tournament, football events were relocated to other venues.

Newtown Park was selected as one of the Wellington training venues for use by national representative teams during the 2023 FIFA Women's World Cup. As part of preparations for hosting these events, the Wellington City Council made improvements to the Newtown Park facilities, including renovation of both turf fields, the installation of floodlights in the main arena, and upgrades of the showers and changing rooms.

== Football ==
Events at Newtown Park are organised by Wellington United during the winter football season.

The second pitch was used by A-League franchise Wellington Phoenix for training and minor exhibition matches before they moved to Martin Luckie Park and then out to Fraser Park in Lower Hutt.

=== Other football events hosted ===
- 1925, 1927, 1989 and 2012 finals of the Chatham Cup.
- 2007 Women's National League Final.
- 2008 Sichuan earthquake relief match - exhibition between Wellington Phoenix United (Note: Not to be confused with Wellington Phoenix FC. Wellington Phoenix United was a team composed of some Phoenix FC players and prominent members of the Wellington football community) and Christchurch Chinese Community.
- 2008 Pre-Olympic Exhibition match - New Zealand Under-23 vs Chile Under-23

== Athletics ==
Newtown Park is the main venue for regional track and field meets managed by Athletics Wellington during the summer season.

As of 2025 the most recently installed track surface is a Spurtan BV completed in January 2018. The track is certified by World Athletics as a Class 2 facility.

In January 2022, the North Island Colgate Games for children aged 7–14 were held at Newtown Park, with 1,200 athletes taking part. Newtown Park was the venue for the 2023 New Zealand Track and Field Championships held from 2-5 March 2023, and the 2024 New Zealand Track and Field Championships from 14-17 March 2024.

School athletics events held at Newtown Park include the McEvedy Shield competition, an annual athletics series between four Wellington boys schools. It is also used by many other schools, and school sports associations as a place to stage in-house athletics events.

The Kiwi Athletic Club has their base at Newtown Park.

== Other events at Newtown Park ==
Newtown Park also occasionally serves as a community events centre for the surrounding area, and has hosted cultural events such as Carols by Candlelight.
