= Waisake Tewa =

Fijian sprinter

Personal information
- Born: 18 September 2003 (age 22) Suva, Fiji
- Height: 185 cm (6 ft 1 in)

Sport
- Country: Fiji
- Sport: Athletics
- Event: 100 m
- Coached by: Bola Tafo'ou

Achievements and titles
- Personal best(s): 10.71s (100 m); 21.61s (200 m)

Waisake Tewa (born 18 September 2003) is a Fijian sprinter who specializes in the 100 and 200 metres. He competed for Fiji in the men's 100 metres at the 2024 Summer Olympics.

== Career ==
Tewa participated in the men's 100 metre final at the 2023 Pacific Games in the Solomon Islands where he finished in fourth place. He also won two silver medals in the men's 4×100 metres relay and 4x400 metres relay.

=== 2024 ===
In March, He attended the World Athletics Indoor Championships that was held in Glasgow, United Kingdom. He competed in the men's 60 metres event.

Later in June, He won a silver medal in the men's 100m final with a time of 11.10s at the 2024 Oceania Athletics Championships.

He subsequently represented Fiji in the men's 100 metres at the 2024 Summer Olympics in Paris. He placed seventh out of eight sprinters in Heat 6 of the men's 100m preliminary rounds with a time of 10.73s.

== Personal best ==
Distance	Time	Date	Venue	Ref
60 metres	7.02s	1 March 2024	Glasgow Arena, Glasgow	
100 metres	10.71s	27 November 2023	National Stadium, Honiara	
200 metres	21.61s	1 December 2023	National Stadium, Honiara	
