= Alison Andrews-Paul =

New Zealand athlete (born 1997)

Personal information
- Born: 18 December 1997 (age 28)

Sport
- Country: New Zealand
- Sport: Athletics
- Event: Middle-distance running

Achievements and titles
- National finals: 800 m champion (2023, 2024)
- Personal best: 800 m: 2:00.81 (2025)
Medal record
Women's athletics
Representing New Zealand
Oceania Championships
Gold medal – first place	2024 Suva	800 m

Alison Andrews-Paul (born 18 December 1997) is a New Zealand middle-distance runner. She won the gold medal at the 2024 Oceania Athletics Championships in the 800 metres.

== Biography ==
She set a personal best time for the 800 metres of 2:06.32 at the 2016 IAAF World U20 Championships in Poland. After which, she won the 2016 Wairarapa Senior Sports Personality award. Although injury and illness hampered her progress, her personal best was broken when running 2:01.43 in Azusa, California in April 2022, by which stage she was being coached by Brit Townsend. She won the 2023 New Zealand Athletics Championships title over 800 metres in Wellington in March 2023.

After moving to study at Simon Fraser University in Canada, she set a personal best of 4:37.86 in the mile run indoors at the Husky Classic in Seattle in February 2024. That year, she retained the New Zealand Athletics Championships title over 800 metres, and ran her second fastest time ever in May 2024 of 2:02.11 whilst racing in Los Angeles. She won the gold medal in the 800 metres at the 2024 Oceania Athletics Championships in Suva, Fiji in June 2024, running a time of 2:03.94. She had been named the New Zealand women's team captain for the Games.

In 2025, she ran a personal best of 2:00.81 in Boston, Massachusetts. In March 2025, she was named in the New Zealand team for the 2025 World Athletics Indoor Championships in Nanjing, platform fifth in her heat in 2:05.76.

In March 2026, running as part of the New Zealand team for the 2026 World Athletics Indoor Championships in Toruń, Poland, Andrews-Paul progressed to the semifinals of the women’s 800m after running her heat in 2:01.46. She improved to 2:01.38 in the semi-final without advancing to the final.

== Personal life ==
Her hometown is Masterton, and she attended Wairarapa College, and Baylor University in Texas. She was later based in Canada in Burnaby, British Colombia, and completed a master's degree in public health at Simon Fraser University, graduating in 2022.
