= Tovetuna Tuna =

Papua New Guinea athlete (born 2003)

Personal information
- Born: 2003 (age 22–23)

Sport
- Sport: Athletics
- Event: Sprint

Achievements and titles
- Personal bests: 60 m: 6.85 s (Lubbock, 2025); 100 m: 10.24 s (Lubbock, 2025) NR; 200 m: 20.64 s (Lubbock, 2025) NR
Medal record
Men's athletics
Representing PNG
Oceania Championships
Gold medal – first place	2024 Suva	4 × 100 m relay
Bronze medal – third place	2024 Suva	200 m
Bronze medal – third place	2022 Mackay	4 × 100 m relay
Pacific Mini Games
Gold medal – first place	2025 Koror	200 m
Gold medal – first place	2025 Koror	4 × 100 m relay
Silver medal – second place	2025 Koror	100 m

Tovetuna Timothy Tuna (born 2003) is a sprinter from Papua New Guinea. He was a bronze medalist over 200 metres at the 2024 Oceania Athletics Championships. In 2025, he became national record holder over 200 metres and 100 metres.

== Early life ==
He is from Matupit Island in Papua New Guinea. He attracted attention for his sprinting ability when he ran 11.01 seconds for the 100 metres in 2019 at the national athletics championships in Kimbe. He later studied and competed at New Mexico Junior College in the United States.

== Career ==
At the 2022 Oceania Athletics Championships he was a bronze medalist in the men's 4 × 100 metres relay in Mackay, Australia.

In June 2024, he was a member of the Papua New Guinea 4 × 100 metres relay team that won the gold medal at the 2024 Oceania Athletics Championships alongside Alphonse Igish, Emmanuel Anis, and Pais Wisil. He also won a bronze medal in the 200 metres at the Games. In October 2024, he was ranked in the top 10 of the Pacific Islands men's and women's World Athletics rankings.

In 2025, he ran a wind assisted 10.09 seconds for the 100 metres. In April 2025, he broke the national record for the 200 metres, running 20.75 seconds in Texas, breaking the previous record set by Theo Piniau. In May 2025, he broke the national record for the 200 metres again, running 20.64 seconds in Lubbock, Texas (+1.3 mp/s). Racing on the same day he also equalled the national record of 10.24 seconds for the 100 metres, co-held by Pais Wisil, despite running into 3 mp/s headwind.

In September 2025, he competed in the 200 metres at the 2025 World Championships in Tokyo, Japan, but did not advance to the semi-finals.

In July 2026, he competed in the 100 metres at the 2026 Commonwealth Games in Glasgow, Scotland, without advancing to the semi-finals. He also competed at the Games in the men's 200 metres. He also ran in the men's 4 × 100 m relay.

== Personal life ==
His father is fellow sprinter and former national record holder, Takale Tuna.
