= New Zealand Athletics Championships =

Sporting event

- Sport: Track and field
- Founded: 1887
- Country: New Zealand
- Related competitions: Australasian Athletics Championships

The New Zealand Athletics Championships is an annual outdoor track and field competition organised by Athletics New Zealand, which serves as the national championship for the sport in New Zealand. It usually takes place over a three-day period from Friday to Sunday. Typically organised in the Southern Hemisphere summer months of February or March, the competition was inaugurated in 1887 as a men-only event, with women's events being added to the programme from 1926 onwards.

In 1893, teams from the Australasian colonies of New South Wales, Victoria, Queensland and New Zealand competed in the first formalised Australasian Athletics Championships meeting. A New Zealand team continued to compete in this event until the 1927/28 event (since only Australian Athletics Championships).

National championship events were held twice in 1973 and 1989, with the 1974 and 1990 championships brought forward and not being held that year.

The early years of the meet served as a colonial competition for the British dominion. New Zealand also sent teams for the Australasian Athletics Championships during its lifetime from 1890 to 1927.

Separate annual championship events are held for the 10,000 metres, 3000 metres, combined track and field events, cross country running, mountain running, road running and racewalking events.

== Events ==
The competition programme features a total of 36 individual New Zealand Championship athletics events, 18 for men and 18 for women. There are six track running events, three obstacle events, four jumps, and four throws. Track races were contested over imperial distances until metric standardisation in 1970.

Track running

- 100 metres, 200 metres, 400 metres, 800 metres, 1500 metres, 5000 metres

Obstacle events

- 100 metres hurdles (women only), 110 metres hurdles (men only), 400 metres hurdles, 3000 metres steeplechase

Jumping events

- Pole vault, high jump, long jump, triple jump

Throwing events

- Shot put, discus throw, javelin throw, hammer throw

Walking events

- 3000 metres walk

The 3000 metres distance was incorporated into the main track and field championships from 1989 up to 2005 for men and from 1976 to 2005 for women. Men contested a 220-yard hurdles until 1970 (with the final event being in the 200 metres hurdles format). A men's 5000 m track walk was introduced in 1975 and was amended to the 3000 m distance in 2000.

Women had an additional short sprint event over 75 yards, which was last held in 1960. The women's programme gradually expanded to match the men's. A women's mile run was first added in 1968 and changed to 1500 m two years later. The 10,000 m was added in 1985 and the 5000 m was included the following year. (Road running also expanded in this time with the first women's marathon national championship occurring in 1980 and a half marathon national title being awarded from 1991 onwards.) The women's 80 metres hurdles was converted to the international standard of 100 m in 1969 and the first women's 400 m hurdles happened six years later in 1975. The women's pentathlon was expanded to the heptathlon at the combined events championship in 1982. The inclusion of triple jump in 1988 boosted the women's jumps programme and the addition of both hammer throw and pole vault in 1992 brought the women's field events to parity with the men. A women's walk was added in 1985. Women achieved parity of events across the programme with the introduction of a women's 2000 metres steeplechase in 1997. This was lengthened to 3000 m to match the men's version in 2001.

== Editions ==
Year	Date	Venue	Results
1996	1–3 March	Auckland	
1997	March	Christchurch	
1998	6–8 March	Wanganui	
1999	26–28 February	Hamilton	
2000	10–12 March	Christchurch	
2001	23–25 February	Hastings	
2002	1–3 March	Auckland	
2003	21–23 March	Dunedin	
2004	12–14 March	Wellington	
2005	11–13 March	Wanganui	
2006	27–29 January	Christchurch	
2007	2–4 March	Inglewood	
2008	28–30 March	Auckland	2008
2009	27–29 March	Wellington	2009
2010	26–28 March	Christchurch	2010
2011	25–27 March	Dunedin	2011
2012	23–25 March	West Auckland	2012
2013	22–24 March	Auckland	2013
2014	28–30 March	Wellington	2014
2015	6–8 March	Wellington	2015
2016	4–6 March	Dunedin	2016
2017	17–19 March	Hamilton	2017
2018	9–11 March	Hamilton	2018
2019	8–10 March	Christchurch	2019
2020	6–8 March	Christchurch	
2021	26–27 March	Hastings	2021
2022	3–6 March	Hastings	2022
2023	2–5 March	Wellington	2023
2024	14–17 March	Wellington	2024
2025	6–9 March	Dunedin	2025

== Championships records ==
=== Men ===
Event	Record	Athlete/Team	Date	Meet	Place	Ref.
800 m	1:44.87	James Preston	15 March 2024	2024 Championships	Wellington	
5000 m	13:43.53	Hayden Wilde	26 March 2021	2021 Championships	Hastings	
Shot put	21.79 m	Tom Walsh	26 March 2021	2021 Championships	Hastings	

=== Women ===
Event	Record	Athlete/Team	Date	Meet	Place	Ref.
100 m	11.07 (+1.8 m/s) NR	Zoe Hobbs	3 March 2023	2023 Championships	Wellington	
400 m hurdles	55.44 NR	Portia Bing	5 March 2022	2022 Championships	Hastings	
Hammer throw	73.55 m NR	Julia Ratcliffe	26 March 2021	2021 Championships	Hastings	
Javelin throw	62.40 m NR	Tori Peeters	5 March 2022	2022 Championships	Hastings	
