= 2021–22 Australian Athletics Championships =

2022 Australian Athletics Championships
- Edition: 99th
- Dates: 26 March – 3 April
- Host city: Sydney, Australia
- Venue: Sydney Olympic Park Athletic Centre
- Level: Senior
- Type: Outdoor

The 2022 Australian Athletics Championships was the 99th edition of the national championship in outdoor track and field for athletes in Australia. It was held between 26 March and 3 April at the Sydney Olympic Park Athletic Centre in Sydney.

== Results ==
=== Men ===
Event	Gold		Silver		Bronze	
100 metres	Jake Doran; Queensland	10.05	Edward Osei-Nketia; New Zealand	10.17	Joshua Azzopardi; New South Wales	10.20
200 metres	Aidan Murphy; South Australia	20.53	Jake Doran; Queensland	20.77	Calab Law; Queensland	20.90
400 metres	Alex Beck; Queensland	46.41	Ian Halpin; New South Wales	46.75	Callum Rorison; Queensland	46.92
800 metres	Peter Bol; Western Australia	1:48.78	Charlie Hunter; New South Wales	1:49.31	Brad Mathas; New Zealand	1:49.52
1500 metres	Oliver Hoare; New South Wales	3:40.79	Matthew Ramsden; Western Australia	3:41.43	Callum Davies; Queensland	3:42.90
5000 metres	Matthew Ramsden; Western Australia	13:40.69	Sam McEntee; Victoria	13:41.01	Jack Bruce; Queensland	13:42.43
110 metres hurdles	Nick Hough; New South Wales	13.68	Nicholas Andrews; New South Wales	13.75	Chris Douglas; Victoria	13.76
400 metres hurdles	Conor Fry; Victoria	51.76	Michael Tsotsos; Victoria	52.57	Matt Crowe; New South Wales	52.96
3000 metres steeplechase	Matthew Clarke; South Australia	8:32.67	Max Stevens; South Australia	8:39.58	Liam Cashin; Victoria	8:43.30
4 × 100 metres relay	Singapore; Marc Brian Louis; Joshua Chua; Ann Heng Xander Ho; Ian Koe	40.07	New South Wales; Shakti Rathore; Connor Bond; Lewis Clabburn; Leonard King	40.89	South Australia; Jacob Aston; Ryan Atkins; Harrison Hunt; Cailen Hejka	41.09
4 × 400 metres relay	Queensland; Cooper Schmidt; Max O'Donnell; Callum Rorison; Connor Diffey	3:13.08	South Australia; Blake Jones; Ryan Atkins; Harrison Hunt; Duncan Cameron	3:13.39	New South Wales; Oscar Pintaric; Max Jolmes; James McPaul; Liam Webb	3:13.96
High jump	Yual Reath; Victoria	2.20	Joel Baden; Victoria	2.15	Simioluwa Thomsen-Ajayi; Queensland	2.15
Pole vault	Kurtis Marschall; Western Australia	5.60	Angus Armstrong; Western Australia	5.40	Dalton Di Medio; Victoria	5.25
Long jump	Christopher Mitrevski; Victoria	8.26	William Freyer; New South Wales	7.82	Henry Frayne; Queensland	7.82
Triple jump	Ayo Ore; Victoria	16.64	Julian Konle; Queensland	16.36	Aiden Hinson; Victoria	16.32
Shot put	Aiden Harvey; Victoria	18.47	Damien Birkinhead; Victoria	18.33	Daniel Green; Queensland	16.76
Discus throw	Matthew Denny; Queensland	62.79	Lachlan Page; South Australia	57.56	Nicholas Dyson; Victoria	51.29
Hammer throw	Ned Weatherly; Victoria	69.20	Timothy Heyes; New South Wales	67.87	Costa Kousparis; New South Wales	66.07
Javelin throw	Cameron McEntyre; New South Wales	78.06	Cruz Hogan; Western Australia	77.34	William White; Queensland	73.94
Decathlon	Cedric Dubler; Queensland	8393	Alec Diamond; New South Wales	8002	Christian Paynter; Victoria	7216
10000 metres race walk	Kyle Swan; Victoria	39:55.17	Will Thompson; Victoria	41:17.05	Quentin Rew; New Zealand	41:46.41

=== Women ===
Event	Gold		Silver		Bronze	
100 metres	Zoe Hobbs; New Zealand	11.17	Ella Conolly; Queensland	11.29	Bree Masters; Queensland	11.33
200 metres	Georgia Hulls; New Zealand	23.17	Ella Conolly; Queensland	23.37	Jacinta Beecher; Queensland	23.48
400 metres	Isabel Neal; New Zealand	52.86	Ellie Beer; Queensland	53.30	Rosie Elliott; New Zealand	53.48
800 metres	Catriona Bisset; Victoria	1:59.83	Claudia Hollingsworth; Victoria	2:02.98	Tess Kirsopp-Cole; Victoria	2:03.39
1500 metres	Abbey Caldwell; Victoria	4:10.75	Georgia Griffith; Victoria	4:11.26	Linden Hall; Victoria	4:12.44
5000 metres	Jessica Hull; New South Wales	15:06.13	Rose Davies; New South Wales	15:07.49	Calli Thackery; Great Britain	15:09.08
100 metres hurdles	Liz Clay; Queensland	12.72	Celeste Mucci; Victoria	12.96	Michelle Jenneke; New South Wales	13.05
400 metres hurdles	Sarah Carli; New South Wales	56.70	Portia Bing; New Zealand	57.13	Brodee Mate; New South Wales	58.39
3000 metres steeplechase	Amy Cashin; Victoria	9:37.92	Brielle Erbacher; Queensland	9:38.56	Cara Feain-Ryan; Queensland	9:40.66
4 × 100 metres relay	New Zealand; Livvy Wilson; Rosie Elliott; Georgia Hulls; Zoe Hobbs	44.05	New South Wales; Katie Smee; Monique Quirk; Kelly McAndrew; Sarah Healey	45.48	South Australia; Kayla Lemm; Jordi McMillan; Margaret Gayen; Christine Gayen	47.12
4 × 400 metres relay	Western Australia; Annie Pfeiffer; Kiara Speechley; Brittany Scott; Emma Philippe	3:41.09	New South Wales; Bethany Halmy; Rowena Craker; Tierney Dunne; Olivia Cason	3:41.81	Victoria; Lily Bayes; Paige Elvey; Anna Plessinger; Elizabeth Dingeldei	3:42.42
High jump	Nicola McDermott; New South Wales	1.94	Emily Whelan; New South Wales	1.80	Alexandra Harrison; New South Wales	1.75
Pole vault	Nina Kennedy; Western Australia	4.35	Jamie Scroop; South Australia	4.20	not awarded	
Pole vault	Nina Kennedy; Western Australia	4.35	Elizaveta Parnova; Western Australia	4.20	not awarded	
Long jump	Samantha Dale; New South Wales	6.64	Jessie Harper; Queensland	6.30	Tomysha Clark; New South Wales	6.26
Triple jump	Roksana Khudoyarova; Uzbekistan	13.54	Kayla Cuba; Queensland	13.51	Desleigh Owusu; New South Wales	13.49
Shot put	Emma Berg; Victoria	13.87	Sally Shokry; New South Wales	13.54	Kaitlyn Coulter; New South Wales	13.50
Discus throw	Jade Lally; Great Britain	59.29	Taryn Gollshewsky; Queensland	54.74	Hannah Edwards; Queensland	49.64
Hammer throw	Alexandra Hulley; New South Wales	67.51	Stephanie Ratcliffe; Victoria	61.77	Caitlyn Hester; Queensland	55.18
Javelin throw	Mackenzie Little; New South Wales	62.09	Alexandra Roberts; Queensland	55.61	Tori Peeters; New Zealand	52.62
Heptathlon	Taneille Crase; Queensland	5759	Alysha Burnett; New South Wales	5315	Tiana Solley; Queensland	5171
10000 metres race walk	Jemima Montag; Victoria	43:02.97	Katie Hayward; Queensland	44:27.80	Rebecca Henderson; Victoria	44:40.09
