= List of Oceania Area Championships in Athletics records =

The Oceania Area Championships in Athletics records are the best marks set by athletes who are representing one of the Oceania Athletics Association's member states during the correspondent athletics event which began in a former competition format in 1990. From 2012 onwards the competition has its present name.

== Men ==
Key: Defunct event

Event	Record	Athlete	Nationality	Date	Championships	Place	Ref.
100 m	10.19 (+1.2 m/s)	Jake Doran	Australia	7 June 2022	2022 Championships	Mackay, Australia	
100 m	10.19 (+0.9 m/s)	Joshua Azzopardi	Australia	20 May 2026	2026 Championships	Darwin, Australia	
200 m	20.05 (+0.6 m/s)	Aidan Murphy	Australia	21 May 2026	2026 Championships	Darwin, Australia	
400 m	44.44	Aidan Murphy	Australia	19 May 2026	2026 Championships	Darwin, Australia	
800 m	1:46.33	Peyton Craig	Australia	7 June 2024	2024 Championships	Suva, Fiji	
1500 m	3:41.91	Jeremy Roff	Australia	25 September 2010	2010 Championships	Cairns, Australia	
5000 m	13:46.39	Sam McEntee	Australia	9 June 2022	2022 Championships	Mackay, Australia	
10,000 m	29:17.97	Haftu Strintzos	Australia	3 June 2024	2024 Championships	Suva, Fiji	
Half marathon	1:09:10	Job Sikoria	Uganda	August 2000	2000 Championships	Adelaide, Australia	guest performance
Half marathon	1:10:40	Georges Richmond	French Polynesia/Tahiti	December 2002	2002 Championships	Christchurch, New Zealand	
110 m hurdles	13.43 (+1.7 m/s)	Nicholas Hough	Australia	9 June 2022	2022 Championships	Mackay, Australia	
400 m hurdles	49.33	Matthew Hunt	Australia	20 May 2026	2026 Championships	Darwin, Australia	
3000 m steeplechase	8:31.00	Matthew Clarke	Australia	6 June 2024	2024 Championships	Suva, Fiji	
High jump	2.30 m	Hamish Kerr	New Zealand	26 June 2019	2019 Championships	Townsville, Australia	
Pole vault	5.40 m	Angus Armstrong	Australia	25 June 2019	2019 Championships	Townsville, Australia	
Long jump	8.05 m (+0.2 m/s)	Liam Adcock	Australia	6 June 2024	2024 Championships	Suva, Fiji	
Triple jump	16.32 m (+0.3 m/s)	Aiden Hinson	Australia	7 June 2024	2024 Championships	Suva, Fiji	
Shot put	20.75 m	Jacko Gill	New Zealand	27 June 2019	2019 Championships	Townsville, Australia	
Discus throw	61.12 m	Alexander Rose	Samoa	1 July 2017	2017 Championships	Suva, Fiji	
Hammer throw	69.09 m	Ned Weatherly	Australia	9 June 2022	2022 Championships	Mackay, Australia	
Javelin throw	80.53 m	Cameron McEntyre	Australia	21 May 2026	2026 Championships	Darwin, Australia	
Octathlon	5131 pts	Nathan Baart	Australia	14/15 December 2006	2006 Championships	Apia, Samoa	
Octathlon	100m (wind) / Long jump (wind) / Shot put / 400m / 110m H (wind) / High jump / Javelin / 1000m; 11.67 / 6.46 m / 12.67 m / 52.92						
Decathlon	8182 pts	Ashley Moloney	Australia	2–3 June 2024	2024 Championships	Suva, Fiji	
Decathlon	100m (wind) / Long jump (wind) / Shot put / High jump / 400m / 110m H (wind) / Discus / Pole vault / Javelin / 1500m; 10.75 (−0.8 m/s) / 6.93 m (+2.4 m/s) / 14.40 m / 1.99 m / 47.22 / 14.12 (−0.9 m/s) / 46.80 m / 5.00 m / 56.68 m / 4:50.89						
5000 m walk	19:57.43	Rhydian Cowley	Australia	9 June 2022	2022 Championships	Mackay, Australia	
10,000 m walk	41:57.57	Rhydian Cowley	Australia	25 June 2019	2019 Championships	Townsville, Australia	
10 km walk (road)	40:21	Dane Bird-Smith	(Northern Territory) / (Queensland) North Australia	June 2012	2012 Championships	Cairns, Australia	
20 km walk (road)	1:39.46	Paul McElwee	New Zealand	July 1990	1990 Championships	Suva, Fiji	
4 × 100 m relay	39.36	Jake Doran; Alex Hartmann; Jack Hale; Zach Holdsworth	Australia	27 June 2019	2019 Championships	Townsville, Australia	
4 × 400 m relay	3:06.90	Kei Takase; Yuzo Kanemaru; Yoshihiro Azuma; Hiroyuki Nakano	Japan	29 June 2012	2012 Championships	Cairns, Australia	guest performance
4 × 400 m relay	3:08.67	Alex Beck; Tyler Gunn; Ian Halpin; Steven Solomon	Australia	28 June 2019	2019 Championships	Townsville, Australia	

== Women ==
Key: Defunct event

Event	Record	Athlete	Nationality	Date	Championships	Place	Ref.
100 m	11.00 (+0.9 m/s)	Zoe Hobbs	New Zealand	19 May 2026	2026 Championships	Darwin, Australia	
200 m	23.14 (−1.7 m/s)	Torrie Lewis	Australia	7 June 2024	2024 Championships	Suva, Fiji	
400 m	51.91	Ellie Beer	Australia	6 June 2024	2024 Championships	Suva, Fiji	
800 m	2:02.16	Catriona Bisset	Australia	27 June 2019	2019 Championships	Townsville, Australia	
1500 m	4:12.33	Claudia Hollingsworth	Australia	7 June 2022	2022 Championships	Mackay, Australia	
5000 m	15:26.29	Jenny Blundell	Australia	5 June 2024	2024 Championships	Suva, Fiji	
10,000 m	37:54.60 NR	Sharon Firisua	Solomon Islands	1 July 2017	2017 Championships	Suva, Fiji	
Half marathon	1:18:57	Kylie Colum	Australia	December 2002	2002 Championships	Christchurch, New Zealand	
100 m hurdles	12.87 (+1.1 m/s)	Michelle Jenneke	Australia	21 May 2026	2026 Championships	Darwin, Australia	
400 m hurdles	55.33	Sarah Carli	Australia	22 May 2026	2026 Championships	Darwin, Australia	
3000 m steeplechase	9:41.54	Amy Cashin	Australia	6 June 2024	2024 Championships	Suva, Fiji	
High jump	1.86 m	Josephine Reeves	New Zealand	28 June 2019	2019 Championships	Townsville, Australia	
High jump	1.86 m	Alysha Burnett	Australia	28 June 2019	2019 Championships	Townsville, Australia	
High jump	1.86 m	Keeley O'Hagan	New Zealand	6 June 2024	2024 Championships	Suva, Fiji	
Pole vault	4.00 m	Jamie Scroop	Australia	29 June 2017	2017 Championships	Suva, Fiji	
Long jump	6.70 m (+0.4 m/s)	Brooke Buschkuehl	Australia	21 May 2026	2026 Championships	Darwin, Australia	
Triple jump	13.56 m (+1.9 m/s)	Kayla Cuba	Australia	8 June 2022	2022 Championships	Mackay, Australia	
Shot put	18.04 m	Maddison-Lee Wesche	New Zealand	25 June 2019	2019 Championships	Townsville, Australia	
Discus throw	60.96 m	Taryn Gollshewsky	Australia	4 June 2024	2024 Championships	Suva, Fiji	
Hammer throw	71.39 m	Julia Ratcliffe	New Zealand	28 June 2019	2019 Championships	Townsville, Australia	
Javelin throw	65.61 m	Kelsey-Lee Barber	Australia	26 June 2019	2019 Championships	Townsville, Australia	
Heptathlon	6070 pts	Camryn Newton-Smith	Australia	1–2 June 2024	2024 Championships	Suva, Fiji	
Heptathlon	100m H (wind) / High jump / Shot put / 200m (wind) / Long jump (wind) / Javelin / 800m; 13.43 (−2.4 m/s) / 1.76 m / 11.82 m / 24.29 (+0.4 m/s) / 6.26 m (+2.0 m/s) / 45.51 m / 2:23.48						
5000 m walk	21:57.48	Claire Tallent	Australia	27 June 2012	2012 Championships	Cairns, Australia	
10,000 m walk	43:50.84	Jemima Montag	Australia	25 June 2019	2019 Championships	Townsville, Australia	
10 km walk (road)	44:19	Claire Tallent	Australia	June 2012	2012 Championships	Cairns, Australia	
4 × 100 m relay	44.06	Ella Connolly; Bree Masters; Monique Quirk; Naa Anang	Australia	9 June 2022	2022 Championships	Mackay, Australia	
4 × 400 m relay	3:35.03	Camryn Smart; Georgia Hulls; Rosie Elliott; Isabel Neal	New Zealand	9 June 2022	2022 Championships	Mackay, Australia	

=== Heptathlon disciplines ===
Event	Record	Athlete	Nation	Date	Championships	Place	Ref.
100 m hurdles	13.43 (+2.0 m/s)	Taneille Crase	Australia	7 June 2022	2022 Championships	Mackay, Australia	
High jump	1.86 m	Alysha Burnett	Australia	26 June 2019	2019 Championships	Townsville, Australia	
Shot put	13.04 m	Alysha Burnett	Australia	7 June 2022	2022 Championships	Mackay, Australia	
200 m	24.26 (+0.4 m/s)	Briana Stephenson	New Zealand	1 June 2024	2024 Championships	Suva, Fiji	
Long jump	6.26 m (+2.0 m/s)	Camryn Newton-Smith	Australia	2 June 2024	2024 Championships	Suva, Fiji	
Javelin throw	47.19 m	Tori West	Australia	2 June 2024	2024 Championships	Suva, Fiji	
800 m	2:19.50	Taneille Crase	Australia	8 June 2022	2022 Championships	Mackay, Australia	

== Mixed ==
Event	Record	Athlete	Nationality	Date	Championships	Place	Ref.
Sprint medley relay	1:33.94	Carla Takchi; Jordan Shelley; Jessica Payne; Murray Goodwin	Australia	30 June 2017	2017 Championships	Suva, Fiji	
4 × 400 m relay	3:23.56	Rebecca Bennett; Ellie Beer; Tom Willems; Ian Halpin	Australia	28 June 2019	2019 Championships	Townsville, Australia	

Key:
^{WR} World record	^{AR} Oceanian record	^{NR} National record
