= 2022–23 Australian Athletics Championships =

2023 Australian Athletics Championships
- Edition: 100th
- Dates: 30 March – 2 April
- Host city: Brisbane, Australia
- Venue: Queensland Sport and Athletics Centre
- Level: Senior and U20
- Type: Outdoor open

The 2023 Australian Athletics Championships was the 100th edition of the national championship in outdoor track and field for athletes in Australia. The commercial name was "2023 Chemist Warehouse Australian Open and Under 20 Championships". It has been held between 30 March and 2 April at the Queensland Sport and Athletics Centre in Brisbane.

The 2023 Australian Championships were the 100th edition of the event, which dates back to 1890 for men, and 1931 for women. The Queensland Sport & Athletics Centre being the venue that has held the most editions of the event (12).

== Results ==
=== Men ===
Event	Gold		Silver		Bronze	
100 metres (wind: 0.0 m/s)	Rohan Browning; NSW	10.02 CR	Dhruv Rodrigues-Chico; New Zealand	10.21	Jacob Despard; Tasmania	10.26
200 metres -0.4	Jake Doran; Queensland	20.81	Yoshihide Kiryū; Japan	20.82	Christopher Ius; NSW	20.87
400 metres	Luke van Ratingen; NSW	45.88	Harrison Hunt; SA	46.21	Cameron Searle; Victoria	46.27
800 metres	Riley McGown; ACT	1:47.67	Lachlan Raper; New South Wales	1:47.83	Luke Boyes; NSW	1:47.90
1500 metres	Callum Davies; Queensland	3:37.92	Cameron Myers; ACT	3:38.02	Matthew Ramsden; WA	3:38.34
5000 metres	Callum Davies; Queensland	13:52.82	Jack Bruce; Queensland	13:52.98	James Hansen; Tasmania	13:53.20
110 metres hurdles (wind: +0.2 m/s)	Mitchell Lightfoot; New South Wales	13.65	Josh Hawkins; New Zealand	13.67 NR	Nicholas Andrews; NSW	13.69
400 metres hurdles	Christopher Douglas; Victoria	50.15	Conor Fry; Victoria	50.83	Jun Jie Calvin Quek; Singapore	51.34
3000 metres steeplechase	Ben Buckingham; Victoria	8:40.52	Matthew Clarke; South Australia	8:40.79	Luke Growes; WA	8:48.20
4 × 100 metres relay	Malaysia; Muhammad Zulfiqar Ismail; Jonathan Nyepa; Muhammad Haiqal Hanafi; Khairul Hafiz Jantan	39.96				
4 × 400 metres relay	Queensland; Chanupa Amarasinghe; Luke McLellan; Taige Hooper; Oliver Maher	3:11.07				
High jump	Joel Baden; Victoria	2.32	Brandon Starc; NSW	2.29	Roman Anastasios; Queensland	2.15
Pole vault	Kurtis Marschall; Western Australia	5.80	James Steyn; New Zealand	5.40	Nick Southgate; New Zealand	5.30
Long jump	Liam Adcock; Victoria	8.06 (-1.1)	Jalen Rucker; New South Wales	8.02 (0.4)	Darcy Roper; Queensland	7.92 (1.4)
Triple jump	Aiden Hinson; Victoria	16.61 (0.6)	Connor Murphy; Queensland	16.61 (0.0)	Julian Konle; Victoria	16.50 (0.5)
Shot put	Aiden Harvey; Victoria	17.92	Daniel Green; Queensland	16.28	Etienne Rousseau; WA	15.88
Discus throw	Matthew Denny; Queensland	63.20	Lachlan Page; South Australia	54.53	Darcy Miller; SA	54.11
Hammer throw	Ned Weatherly; Victoria	68.81	Costa Kousparis; New South Wales	67.77	Timothy Heyes; New South Wales	65.86
Javelin throw	Liam O'Brien; Queensland	77.62	Cameron McEntyre; NSW	76.83	Howard McDonald; Queensland	75.30
Decathlon	Max Attwell; New Zealand	7588	Alec Diamond; New South Wales	7535	Christian Paynter; Victoria	7385
10000 metres race walk	Declan Tingay; WA	38:46.74	Kyle Swan; Victoria	39:18.74	Rhydian Cowley; Victoria	39:46.88

=== Women ===
Event	Gold		Silver		Bronze	
100m	Shanti Pereira; Singapore	11.37	Torrie Lewis; Australia	11.38	Bree Masters; Australia	11.41
200m	Torrie Lewis; Australia	23.02	Ella Connolly; Australia	23.16	Riley Day; Australia	23.24
400m	Jessie Andrew; Australia	52.62	Ellie Beer; Australia	53.16	Helen Pretorius; Australia	54.11
800m	Catriona Bisset; Australia	1:58.32 CR	Ellie Sanford; Australia	2:00.50	Lora Storey; Australia	2:04.43
1500m	Jessica Hull; Australia	4:04.19 CR	Abbey Caldwell; Australia	4:04.68	Linden Hall; Australia	4:05.65
5000m	Jessica Hull; Australia	15:05.87 CR	Rose Davies; Australia	15:23.25	Leanne Pompeani; Australia	15:31.17
10,000m Race Walk	Olivia Sandery; Australia	44:56.00	Allanah Pitcher; Australia	45:43.34	Hannah Mison; Australia	46:02.80
100mH	Michelle Jenneke; Australia	12.77	Celeste Mucci; Australia	12.92	Hannah Jones; Australia	12.99
400mH	Sarah Carli; Australia	56.56	Daniela Roman; Australia	58.00	Loan Ville; France	58.74
3000mSC	Cara Feain-Ryan; Australia	9:43.64	Georgia Winkcup; Australia	9:46.34	Amy Cashin; Australia	9:47.09
4x100m	Singapore; Singapore; Shanti Pereira; Elizabeth-Ann Shee Ru Tan; Roxanne Rose Zulueta Enriquez; Bernice Yee Ling Liew	45.51	New South Wales; Australia; Jessica Laurance; Bronte Carroll; Bronte Pickering; Katie Smee	45.54	Queensland; Australia; Amelia Finger; Elly Buckholz; Cebile Mpofu; Amaya Mearns	45.61
4x400m	New South Wales; Australia; Genevieve Cowie; Helen Pretorius; Tierney Dunne; Rowena Craker	3:41.12	Western Australia; Australia; Annie Pfeiffer; Emma Philippe; Kiara Speechley; Brittany Scott	3:42.30	Victoria; Australia; Ashleigh Palmer; Tess Kirsopp-Cole; Paige Elvey; Daniela Roman	3:43.27
Discus Throw	Jade Lally; Great Britain	60.24 m	Taryn Gollshewsky; Australia	59.36 m	Nora Monie; Cameroon	55.72 m
Hammer Throw	Alexandra Hulley; Australia	67.32 m	Lara Roberts; Australia	58.70 m	Alysha Pearson; Australia	56.70 m
Heptathlon	Ruby Sulicich; Australia	3201	Maya Lange; Australia	3711	Olivia Carah; Australia	3859
High Jump	Nicola Olyslagers; Australia	1.95 m	Emily Whelan; Australia	1.86 m	Erin Shaw; Australia	1.86 m
Javelin Throw	Mackenzie Little; Australia	61.46 m	Kelsey-Lee Barber; Australia	57.05 m	Katrina Blackett; Australia	52.08 m
Long Jump	Brooke Buschkuehl; Australia	6.68 m	Alyssa Lowe; Australia	6.45 m	Annie McGuire; Australia	6.40 m
Pole Vault	Eliza McCartney; New Zealand	4.75 m =CR	Imogen Ayris; New Zealand	4.40 m	Elyssia Kenshole; Australia	4.20 m
Shot Put	Emma Berg; Australia	15.15 m	Marley Raikiwasa; Australia	14.27 m	Xylavene Beale; Australia	14.03 m
Triple Jump	Desleigh Owusu; Australia	13.33 m	Kayla Cuba; Australia	13.05 m	Annabelle Parmegiani; Australia	12.88 m
