= 2022 Oceania Athletics Championships =

- Dates: June 7 – 9
- Host city: Mackay, Australia
- Venue: Mackay Aquatic and Recreation Centre
- Level: Senior
- Events: 46
- Participation: ~700 athletes from 20 nations

The 2022 Oceania Athletics Championships, the sixteenth edition of the Oceania Athletics Championships, were held in Mackay, North Queensland from June 7–9, 2022.

Originally scheduled for 2021 in Port Vila, Vanuatu, on February 16, 2021, Oceania Athletics announced that the event would not be conducted due to the COVID-19 pandemic. It was later announced that the championships would be rescheduled and relocated to a new venue in 2022.

The Championships were held jointly with the U18 Championships, U20 Championships, Para Championships and Masters Championships, including an U16 team challenge.

== Participating teams ==
- American Samoa
- Australia (104) (Host)
  - (Northern Territory) / (Queensland) Northern Australia as "Regional Australia"
- Cook Islands
- Federated States of Micronesia
- Fiji
- French Polynesia
- Guam
- Kiribati
- Nauru
- New Caledonia
- New Zealand
- Northern Mariana Islands
- Papua New Guinea
- Samoa
- Solomon Islands
- Tonga
- Vanuatu
- Wallis and Futuna

== Medal table ==
* Host nation (Australia)

Rank	Nation	Gold	Silver	Bronze	Total
1	Australia*	31	24	25	80
2	New Zealand	12	14	4	30
3	Northern Mariana Islands	1	1	0	2
4	Fiji	1	0	2	3
5	Tonga	1	0	0	1
6	Papua New Guinea	0	3	6	9
7	Cook Islands	0	0	1	1
7	Vanuatu	0	0	1	1
Totals (8 entries)		46	42	39	127

== Event summary ==
Complete results can be found on the Oceania Athletics Association webpage.

=== Men ===
==== Track events ====
Event	Gold		Silver		Bronze	
100 metres (+1.2 m/s)	Jake Doran; Australia	10.19 CR	Edward Osei-Nketia; New Zealand	10.23	Joshua Azzopardi; Australia	10.27
200 metres (+1.8 m/s)	Aidan Murphy; Australia	20.76	Calab Law; Australia	20.90	Jake Doran; Australia	20.91
400 metres	Alex Beck; Australia	46.71	Liam Webb; New Zealand	47.50	Ian Halpin; Australia	48.73
800 metres	Brad Mathas; New Zealand	1:53.60	Michael Dawson; New Zealand	1:55.37	Adolf Kauba; Papua New Guinea	1:56.94
1500 metres	Sam Tanner; New Zealand	3:42.56 CR	Mick Stanovsek; Australia	3:45.98	Matthew Taylor; New Zealand	3:50.18
5000 metres	Sam McEntee; Australia	13:46.39 CR	Jack Bruce; Australia	13:57.65	Yeshnil Karan; Fiji	15:26.45
10,000 metres	Tim Vincent; Australia	29:49.66	Siune Kagl; Papua New Guinea	32:44.08	Simon Charley; Vanuatu	35:55.78
110 metres hurdles (+1.7 m/s)	Nicholas Hough; Australia	13.43 CR	Nicholas Andrews; Australia	13.62	Sam Hurwood; Australia	13.70
400 metres hurdles	Conor Fry; Australia	52.10	Luke Major; Australia	52.84	Daniel Baul; Papua New Guinea	53.10
3000 metres steeplechase	Liam Cashin; Australia	9:01.62	Luke Graves; Australia	9:15.35	Aquila Turalom; Papua New Guinea	9:56.26
5000 metres race walk	Rhydian Cowley; Australia	19:57.43 CR				
10,000 metres race walk	Rhydian Cowley; Australia	46:32.45				
4 × 100 metres relay	Fiji; Waisale Inoke; Banuve Tabakaucoro; Meli Ramuakalou; Nikola Raiqeu	41.64	Papua New Guinea; Pais Wisil; Terrence Talio; Karo Iga; Timothy Tuna	41.77	Cook Islands; Edward Nga; Piritau Nga; Ulukalalaata Pasina; Daniel Tolosa	47.24
4 × 400 metres relay	Australia; Conor Fry; Ian Halpin; Aidan Murphy; Luke Major	3:11.14	Papua New Guinea; Pais Wisil; Adolf Kauba; Terrence Talio; Daniel Baul	3:17.06	Fiji; Banuve Tabakaucoro; Nikola Raiqeu; Kameli Sauduadua; Meli Ramuakalou	3:19.12

==== Field events ====
Event	Gold		Silver		Bronze	
High jump	Hamish Kerr; New Zealand	2.24 m	Yual Reath; Australia	2.21 m	Joel Baden; Australia	2.15 m
Pole vault	Dalton Di Medio; Australia	5.10 m	James Steyn; New Zealand	5.10 m	Angus Armstrong; Australia	5.10 m
Long jump	Christopher Mitrevski; Australia	7.90 m (±0.0 m/s)	Darcy Roper; Australia	7.84 m (±0.0 m/s)	Karo Iga; Papua New Guinea	7.17 m (+0.8 m/s)
Triple jump	Julian Konle; Australia	16.21 m CR (±0.0 m/s)	Ayo Ore; Australia	16.17 m (+1.5 m/s)	Shemaiah James; Australia	15.94 m (+0.4 m/s)
Shot put	Damien Birkinhead; Australia	18.59 m	Ryan Ballantyne; New Zealand	18.42 m	Nick Palmer; New Zealand	18.21 m
Discus throw	Connor Bell; New Zealand	57.51 m	Lachlan Page; Australia	54.83 m	De'bono Paraka; Papua New Guinea	53.33 m
Javelin throw	Cruz Hogan; Australia	79.25 m CR	Cameron McEntyre; Australia	78.42 m	Hamish Peacock; Australia	74.91 m
Hammer throw	Ned Weatherly; Australia	69.09 m CR	Anthony Nobilo; New Zealand	67.29 m	Timothy Heyes; Australia	66.31 m

==== Multi-events ====
Event	Gold		Silver		Bronze	
Decathlon	Max Attwell; New Zealand	7,635 pts	Alec Diamond; Australia	7,582 pts	Christian Paynter; Australia	7,296 pts

=== Women ===
==== Track events ====
Event	Gold		Silver		Bronze	
100 metres (+0.8 m/s)	Zoe Hobbs; New Zealand	11.09 CR, AR	Bree Masters; Australia	11.34	Ella Connolly; Australia	11.53
200 metres (+1.0 m/s)	Georgia Hulls; New Zealand	23.45	Ella Connolly; Australia	23.82	Bree Masters; Australia	23.87
400 metres	Rosie Elliott; New Zealand	52.97	Isabel Neal; New Zealand	53.47	Jessica Thornton; Australia	53.71
800 metres	Tess Kirsopp-Cole; Australia	2:04.63	Claudia Hollingsworth; Australia	2:04.79	Holly Manning; New Zealand	2:06.35
1500 metres	Claudia Hollingsworth; Australia	4:12.33 CR	Abbey Caldwell; Australia	4:12.62	Jaylah Hancock-Cameron; Australia	4:15.11
5000 metres	Paige E Campbell; Australia	16:07.56	Nathania Tan; Northern Mariana Islands	19:31.01	Ongan Awa; Papua New Guinea	19:58.68
10,000 metres	Nathania Tan; Northern Mariana Islands	41:15.60				
100 metres hurdles (+1.3 m/s)	Celeste Mucci; Australia	12.75	Michelle Jenneke; Australia	12.95	Abbie Taddeo; Australia	13.05
400 metres hurdles	Sarah Carli; Australia	55.98 CR	Brodee Mate; Australia	58.82	Genevieve Cowie; Australia	60.47
3000 metres steeplechase	Brielle Erbacher; Australia	9:57.60	Cara Feain-Ryan; Australia	9:59.67		
5000 metres race walk	Courtney Ruske; New Zealand	25:02.84				
10,000 metres race walk	Jemima Montag; Australia	44:18.86	Rebecca Henderson; Australia	45:31.41	Katie Hayward; Australia	46:14.77
4 × 100 metres relay	Australia; Ella Connolly; Bree Masters; Monique Quirk; Naa Anang	44.06 CR	New Zealand; Talia van Rooyen; Brooke Somerfield; Amy Robertson; Marielle Venida	47.33		
4 × 400 metres relay	New Zealand; Camryn Smart; Georgia Hulls; Rosie Elliott; Isabel Neal	3:35.03 CR	Australia; Sarah Carli; Jessica Thornton; Jasmin Guthrie; Helen Pretorius	3:37.62		

==== Field events ====
Event	Gold		Silver		Bronze	
High jump	Erin Shaw; Australia	1.85 m	Keeley O'Hagan; New Zealand	1.82 m	Emily Whelan; Australia	1.76 m
Pole vault	Olivia McTaggart; New Zealand	4.50 m	Imogen Ayris; New Zealand	4.40 m	Jamie Scroop; Australia	4.00 m
Long jump	Tomysha Clark; Australia	6.38 m (+1.2 m/s)	Samantha Dale; Australia	6.31 m (+1.3 m/s)	Mariah Ririnui; New Zealand	6.20 m (+0.6 m/s)
Triple jump	Kayla Cuba; Australia	13.56 m CR (+1.9 m/s)	Desleigh Owusu; Australia	13.30 m (+1.3 m/s)	Chloe Grenade; Australia	12.76 m (+1.3 m/s)
Shot put	'Ata Maama Tu'utafaiva; Tonga	16.29 m	Lyvante Su'emai; Australia	15.27 m	Emma Berg; Australia	15.05 m
Discus throw	Taryn Gollshewsky; Australia	57.39 m	Tatiana Kaumoana; New Zealand	54.20 m	Lyvante Su'emai; Australia	52.80 m
Javelin throw	Mackenzie Little; Australia	63.18 m	Tori Peeters; New Zealand	60.68 m	Kelsey-Lee Barber; Australia	60.63 m
Hammer throw	Nicole Bradley; New Zealand	67.99 m	Lauren Bruce; New Zealand	67.90 m	Alexandra Hulley; Australia	67.11 m

==== Multi-events ====
Event	Gold		Silver		Bronze	
Heptathlon	Taneille Crase; Australia	5,945 pts CR	Christina Ryan; New Zealand	5,282 pts	Alysha Burnett; Australia	4,525 pts
