= 2019 Oceania Athletics Championships =

- Dates: June 25 – 28
- Host city: Townsville, Australia
- Venue: Townsville Sports Reserve
- Level: Senior
- Events: 60
- Participation: ~700 athletes from 22 nations

The 2019 Oceania Athletics Championships were held in Townsville, Australia between June 25–28, 2019. The event was held jointly with the Oceania under 18 and under 20 championships, including exhibition events for masters and for athletes with disabilities (parasports).

== Participating teams ==
A total of 19 teams participated in the senior championships. There were 18 nations with 1 regional team from Australia. The regional Australian team (RAT) competed separately and not as Australia.

- American Samoa
- Australia (Host)
  - (Northern Territory) / (Queensland) Northern Australia
- Cook Islands
- Federated States of Micronesia
- Fiji
- French Polynesia
- Guam
- Kiribati
- Nauru
- New Caledonia
- New Zealand
- Northern Mariana Islands
- Papua New Guinea
- Samoa
- Solomon Islands
- Tonga
- Vanuatu
- Wallis and Futuna

== Medal table ==
This is an unofficial medal tally of the 2019 championships. The official table can be found on the Oceania Athletics Association website.

* Host nation (Australia)

Rank	Nation	Gold	Silver	Bronze	Total
1	Australia*	34	30	21	85
2	New Zealand	8	11	13	32
3	Papua New Guinea	2	2	5	9
4	Samoa	1	0	1	2
5	Fiji	0	1	0	1
5	Guam	0	1	0	1
7	Tonga	0	0	1	1
Totals (7 entries)		45	45	41	131

Updated: 28 June, 2019

== Event summary ==
Complete results can be found on the Oceania Athletics Association webpage.

Note: Athletes in italics competed as guests.

=== Men ===
==== Track events ====
Event	Gold		Silver		Bronze	
100 metres	Edward Osei-Nketia; New Zealand	10.34	Jake Doran; Australia	10.39	Jack Hale; Australia	10.51
200 metres	Jeremy Dodson; Samoa	21.11	Banuve Tabakaucoro; Fiji	21.15	Alex Hartmann; Australia	21.17
400 metres	Steven Solomon; Australia	46.12 CR	Tyler Gunn; Australia	46.51	Alex Beck; Australia	46.61
800 metres	Josh Ralph; Australia	1:49.34 CR	Mason Cohen; Australia	1:49.77	Brad Mathas; New Zealand	1:50.47
1500 metres	Matthew Ramsden; Australia	3:44.41	Rorey Hunter; Australia	3:44.67	Samuel Tanner; New Zealand	3:46.30
5000 metres	Oli Chignell; New Zealand	14:07.17 CR	Matthew Baxter; New Zealand	14:8.87	Andrew Buchanan; Australia	14:19.53
10,000 metres	Harry Summers; Australia	29:19.99 CR	Jack Rayner; Australia	29:55.41	Siune Kagl; Papua New Guinea	32:47.14
10,000 metres race walk	Rhydian Cowley; Australia	41:57.57 CR	Declan Tingay; Australia	42:42.44		
100 metres hurdles	Nicholas Hough; Australia	13.77 CR	Nicholas Andrews; Australia	13.84	Jacob McCorry; Australia	14.13
400 metres hurdles	Ian Dewhurst; Australia	50.79	Michael Cochrane; New Zealand	51.54	Daniel Baul; Papua New Guinea	52.30
3000 metres steeplechase	Ben Buckingham; Australia	8:41.15	Max Stevens; Australia	8:43.22	Matthew Clarke; Australia	8:45.14
4 × 100 metres relay	Australia; Jake Doran; Alex Hartmann; Jack Hale; Zach Holdsworth	39.36	Papua New Guinea; Linus Kuravi; Benjamin Aliel; Manoka John; Michael Penny	41.85	Samoa; Paulo Wallwork-Tuala; Tapasu Paea; Kolone Alefosio; Kelvin Masoe	41.97
4 × 400 metres relay	Australia; Alex Beck; Tyler Gunn; Ian Halpin; Steven Solomon	3:08.67	Papua New Guinea; Emmanuel Wanga; Kaminiel Matlaun; Daniel Baul; Benjamin Aliel	3:13.32	New Zealand; Max Attwell; Luke Mercieca; Samuel Tanner; Joshua Ledger	3:14.33
WR world record | AR area record | CR championship record | GR games record | NR national record | OR Olympic record | PB personal best | SB season best | WL world leading (in a given season)

==== Field events ====
Event	Gold		Silver		Bronze	
High jump	Hamish Kerr; New Zealand	2.30m CR, =NR	Brandon Starc; Australia	2.22m	Joel Baden; Australia	2.14m
Pole vault	Angus Armstrong; Australia	5.40m CR	Stephen Clough; Australia	5.30m	Nick Southgate; New Zealand	5.30m
Long jump	Henry Smith; Australia	7.91m CR	Jordan Peters; New Zealand	7.61m	Christopher Mitrevski; Australia	7.50m
Triple jump	Alwyn Jones; Australia	15.85m	Ayo Ore; Australia	15.73m	Peniel Richard; Papua New Guinea	15.24m
Shot put	Jacko Gill; New Zealand	20.75m CR	Damien Birkenhead; Australia	19.55m	Ryan Ballantyne; New Zealand	19.05m
Discus throw	Mitchell Cooper; Australia	60.25m	Alexander Parkinson; New Zealand	58.32m	Marshall Hall; New Zealand	57.03m
Hammer throw	Costa Kousparis; Australia	66.20m	Ned Weatherly; Australia	65.94m	Anthony Nobilo; New Zealand	64.93m
Javelin throw	Nash Lowis; Australia	79.10m CR	Liam O'Brien; Australia	77.32m	Alex Wood; New Zealand	71.44m
WR world record | AR area record | CR championship record | GR games record | NR national record | OR Olympic record | PB personal best | SB season best | WL world leading (in a given season)

==== Multi-events ====
Event	Gold		Silver		Bronze	
Decathlon	Ashley Moloney; Australia	8,103 points CR	Cedric Dubler; Australia	8,031 points	Kyle Cranston; Australia	7,702 points
WR world record | AR area record | CR championship record | GR games record | NR national record | OR Olympic record | PB personal best | SB season best | WL world leading (in a given season)

=== Women ===
==== Track events ====
Event	Gold		Silver		Bronze	
100 metres	Zoe Hobbs; New Zealand	11.56 CR	Naa Anang; Australia	11.67	Georgia Hulls; New Zealand	11.99
200 metres	Riley Day; Australia	23.51	Zoe Hobbs; New Zealand	23.68	Nana-Adoma Owusu-Afriyie; Australia	23.86
400 metres	Bendere Oboya; Australia	52.76 CR	Caitlin Jones; Australia	53.65	Angeline Blackburn; Australia	55.00
800 metres	Catriona Bisset; Australia	2:02.16 CR	Angela Petty; New Zealand	2:03.41	Morgan Mitchell; Australia	2:05.02
1500 metres	Georgia Griffith; Australia	4:12.53 CR	Bernadette Williams; Australia	4:13.52	Sarah Billings; Australia	4:16.41
5000 metres	Melissa Duncan; Australia	15:41.44 CR	Paige Campbell; Australia	15:46.25	Tara Palm; Australia	16:35.16
10,000 metres	Sinead Diver; Australia	32:25.86	Ellie Pashley; Australia	32:29.08	Emily Brichacek; Australia	33:23.45
10,000 metres race walk	Jemima Montag; Australia	43:50.84 CR	Katie Hayward; Australia	45:35.81		
100 metres hurdles	Brianna Beahan; Australia	13.30	Celeste Mucci; Australia	13.49	Michelle Jenneke; Australia	13.81
400 metres hurdles	Sara Klein; Australia	56.07 CR	Sarah Carli; Australia	56.72	Portia Bing; New Zealand	57.11
3000 metres steeplechase	Paige Campbell; Australia	9:46.40	Georgia Winkcup; Australia	9:46.51	Stella Radford; Australia	10:16.50
4 × 100 metres relay	Australia; Nana-Adoma Owusu-Afriyie; Kristie Edwards; Riley Day; Celeste Mucci	44.47	New Zealand; Olivia Eaton; Brooke Somerfield; Georgia Hulls; Natasha Eady	45.19	Papua New Guinea; Adrine Monagi; Toea Wisil; Nancy Malamut; Leonie Beu	47.08
4 × 400 metres relay	Australia; Angeline Blackburn; Caitlin Jones; Ellie Beer; Morgan Mitchell	3:38.86 CR	New Zealand; Stella Pearless; Angela Petty; Katherine Camp; Krystie Solomon		Papua New Guinea; Leonie Beu; Donna Koniel; Isilia Apkup; Nancy Malamut	3:53.49
WR world record | AR area record | CR championship record | GR games record | NR national record | OR Olympic record | PB personal best | SB season best | WL world leading (in a given season)

==== Field events ====
Event	Gold		Silver		Bronze	
High jump	Josephine Reeves; New Zealand	1.86m CR	Alysha Burnett; Australia	1.86m CR	Hannah Joye; Australia	1.84m
Pole vault	Liz Parnov; Australia	4.60m	Olivia McTaggart; New Zealand	4.25m	Lisa Campbell; Australia	4.10m
Long jump	Rellie Kaputin; Papua New Guinea	6.50m CR, NR	Brooke Stratton; Australia	6.49m	Naa Anang; Australia	6.44m
Triple jump	Rellie Kaputin; Papua New Guinea	13.04m	Ellen Pettitt; Australia	12.94m	Aliyah Johnson; Australia	12.87m
Shot put	Maddi Wesche; New Zealand	18.04m CR	Victoria Owers; New Zealand	16.26m	'Ata Maama Tu'utafaiva; Tonga	16.15m
Discus throw	Kimberley Mulhall; Australia	55.88m	Taryn Gollshewsky; Australia	55.14m	Sositina Hakeai; New Zealand	54.96m
Hammer throw	Julia Ratcliffe; New Zealand	71.39m CR	Alexandra Hulley; Australia	65.81m	Nicole Bradley; New Zealand	64.49m
Javelin throw	Kelsey-Lee Barber; Australia	65.61m CR	Mackenzie Little; Australia	57.74m	Tori Peeters; New Zealand	51.79m
WR world record | AR area record | CR championship record | GR games record | NR national record | OR Olympic record | PB personal best | SB season best | WL world leading (in a given season)

==== Multi-events ====
Event	Gold		Silver		Bronze	
Heptathlon	Kiara Reddingius; Australia	5,149 points	Christina Ryan; New Zealand	4,756 points	Only two finishers	n/a
WR world record | AR area record | CR championship record | GR games record | NR national record | OR Olympic record | PB personal best | SB season best | WL world leading (in a given season)

=== Mixed ===
Event	Gold		Silver		Bronze
4 × 400 metres relay	Australia; Rebecca Bennett; Ellie Beer; Tom Willems; Ian Halpin	3:23.56	Guam; Maurine De La Paz; Paul Dimalanta; Genina Criss; Christian Ruder	4:02.38	

=== Para-events ===
All para-events contested were exhibition events only, thus, results were not included in the medal table.

==== Men ====
Event	Gold		Silver		Bronze	
100 metres Ambulatory	Chad Perris (T13); Australia	11.18	Scott Reardon (T63/F63); Australia	12.98	Elias Larry; Papua New Guinea	14.29
200 metres Ambulatory	Chad Perris (T13); Australia	22.51	Joshua Lush (T20/F20); Australia	23.81	Steven Abraham (T46); Papua New Guinea	23.91
400 metres Ambulatory	James Turner (T36); Australia	53.24	Steven Abraham (T46); Papua New Guinea	56.30	James Tirado (T13); Australia	59.03
Long jump Ambulatory	Joshua Lush (T20/F20); New Zealand	6.18m	Lleyton Lloyd (T20); Australia	5.66m	Blake Carr (T20/F20); Australia	5.20m
Shot put Ambulatory	Marty Jackson (F38); Australia	14.27m	Todd Hodgetts (F20); Australia	15.43m	Ben Tuimaseve (F37); New Zealand	12.01m
Javelin Ambulatory	Jayden Sawyer (T38/F38); Australia	50.57m	Inosi Bulimairewa (F63); Fiji	49.55m	Morea Mararos (F34); Papua New Guinea	19.62m
WR world record | AR area record | CR championship record | GR games record | NR national record | OR Olympic record | PB personal best | SB season best | WL world leading (in a given season)

==== Women ====
Event	Gold		Silver		Bronze	
100 metres Ambulatory	Alexandria Eves (T36); Australia	16.67	Libby Leikis (T37/F37); New Zealand	16.61	Karlee Symonds (T11/F11); Australia	15.46
200 metres Ambulatory	Jessie Venner (T20); Australia	29.00	Amelia Mazzei (T20); Australia	30.29	Libby Leikis (T37/F37); New Zealand	33.90
400 metres Ambulatory	Torita Blake (T38); Australia	66.64	Amelia Mazzei (T20); Australia	68.14		
Long jump Ambulatory	Summer Giddings (T35); Australia	2.99m	Vanessa Low (T61/F61); Australia	4.71m		
Shot put Ambulatory	Lisa Adams (F37); New Zealand	15.21m	Claire Keefer (F41); Australia	8.78m	Amy Dunn (T41/F41); New Zealand	5.42m
Shot put Secured	Jess Gillan (F34); New Zealand	7.68m	Julie Charlton (T54/F57); Australia	5.60m		
Javelin Ambulatory	Holly Robinson (T47/F46); New Zealand	40.78m	Samamtha Schmidt (F38); Australia	27.86m		
Javelin Secured	Julie Charlton (T54/F57); Australia	12.06m				
WR world record | AR area record | CR championship record | GR games record | NR national record | OR Olympic record | PB personal best | SB season best | WL world leading (in a given season)
