= Nketia =

Nketia is a surname. Notable people with the surname include:

- Johnson Asiedu Nketiah (born 1956), Ghanaian politician
- Augustine Nketia (born 1970), Ghanaian athlete
- Edward Osei-Nketia (born 2001), New Zealand sprinter
- Joseph Hanson Kwabena Nketia (1921–2019), Ghanaian ethnomusicologist and composer
