= 2022 World Athletics U20 Championships – Men's 110 metres hurdles =

Men's 110 metres hurdles at the 2022 World Athletics U20 Championships
- Venue: Estadio Olímpico Pascual Guerrero
- Dates: 1 August (qualification); 2 August (semifinal); 3 August (final)
- Winning time: 13.23

Medalists
gold medal	Antoine Andrews	Bahamas
silver medal	Malik Mixon	United States
bronze medal	Matthew Sophia	Netherlands

The men's 110 metres hurdles at the 2022 World Athletics U20 Championships was held at the Estadio Olímpico Pascual Guerrero in Cali, Colombia on 1, 2 and 3 August 2022.

Originally, 56 athletes from 38 countries entered to the competition, however, only 50 of them participated.

== Records ==
U20 standing records prior to the 2022 World Athletics U20 Championships were as follows:

Record	Athlete & Nationality	Mark	Location	Date
World U20 Record	Sasha Zhoya (FRA)	12.72	Nairobi, Kenya	21 August 2021
Championship Record	Sasha Zhoya (FRA)	12.72	Nairobi, Kenya	21 August 2021
World U20 Leading	Matthew Sophia (NED)	13.23	Willemstad, Curaçao	12 March 2022

== Results ==
=== Round 1 ===
Round 1 took place on 1 August, with the 50 athletes involved being split into 7 heats, 6 heats of 7 and 1 of 8 athletes. The first 3 athletes in each heat ( Q ) and the next 3 fastest ( q ) qualified to the semi-final. The overall results were as follows:

Wind:
Heat 1: 0.0 m/s, Heat 2: +0.2 m/s, Heat 3: +1.6 m/s, Heat 4: +0.2 m/s, Heat 5: -0.3 m/s, Heat 6: -0.3 m/s, Heat 7: +0.5 m/s

Rank	Heat	Name	Nationality	Time	Note
1	1	Matthew Sophia	Netherlands	13.10	Q, PB
2	3	Antoine Andrews	Bahamas	13.36	Q, NU20R
3	7	Tayleb Willis	Australia	13.67	Q
4	1	Sisínio Ambriz	Portugal	13.68	Q
5	7	Bogdan Vidojković	Serbia	13.69 [.681]	Q, NU20R
6	7	Dishaun Lamb	Jamaica	13.69 [.683]	Q
7	1	Carter Birade	Canada	13.73 [.722]	Q
8	5	TJ Caldwell	United States	13.73 [.727]	Q
9	6	Denmar Jacobs	South Africa	13.74	Q
10	4	Yuan-Kai Hsieh	Chinese Taipei	13.75	Q
11	5	Manuel Mordi	Germany	13.77 [.766]	Q
12	5	Thiago Ornelas	Brazil	13.77 [.769]	Q
13	4	Kherrafi Moncif	Algeria	13.79	Q, PB
14	2	Demario Prince	Jamaica	13.80	Q
15	3	Christos-Panagiotis Roumtsios	Greece	13.82 [.815]	Q, PB
16	2	Štěpán Schubert	Czech Republic	13.82 [.818]	Q
17	2	Markus Moberg	Sweden	13.83	Q
18	6	Mitchell Lightfoot	Australia	13.89	Q
19	7	Elvin Yap Zhi Xian	Malaysia	13.91	q, PB
20	4	Enzo Diessl	Austria	13.92	Q
21	6	Šimon Weiser	Czech Republic	13.94	Q
22	5	Oscar Dugue	France	13.95	q
23	1	Issiah Patrick	Grenada	13.98	q, PB
24	2	Francisco Marques	Portugal	14.06	
25	7	Jose Eduardo Mendes	Brazil	14.08	
26	2	Aaron Giurgian	Germany	14.09	
27	3	Malik Mixon	United States	14.10 [.091]	Q
28	3	Jorim Bangue	Cameroon	14.10 [.094]	
28	3	Tatsuki Abe	Japan	14.10 [.094]	
30	5	Graceson Amalda	India	14.13	
31	6	Winson Vasquez	Venezuela	14.17	
32	1	Nathan Oberti	Switzerland	14.18 [.172]	
33	5	Kaweesha Bandara	Sri Lanka	14.18 [.175]	
34	3	Kevin Medieta	Paraguay	14.25	
35	6	Fabio Kobelt	Switzerland	14.29	
36	1	Lukáš Ševčik	Slovakia	14.30	
37	4	Juan Apodaca	Ecuador	14.31	
38	3	Doudai Oumar	Qatar	14.37	
39	7	Alexandru Sendrea	Romania	14.38	
40	4	Yaider Palomeque	Colombia	14.61	
41	4	Ryona Manago	Japan	14.70	
42	2	Strahinja Radaković	Serbia	14.80	
43	5	Nayef Al-Rashidi	Bahrain	15.71	
44	4	Hernan Pereira	Honduras	16.22	
45	6	Zoltán Polyák	Hungary	34.36	
	4	Emel Keyser	South Africa	DQ	
	1	Damiano Dentato	Italy	DQ	
	2	Ryder King	Canada	DQ	
	7	Mohammed Al-Shiblawi	Iraq	DNS	
	6	Khalian Vitalis	Saint Lucia	DNS	

=== Semi-final ===
The semi-final took place on 2 August, with the 24 athletes involved being split into 3 heats of 8 athletes each. The first 2 athletes in each heat ( Q ) and the next 2 fastest ( q ) qualified to the final. The overall results were as follows:

Wind:
Heat 1: +0.3 m/s, Heat 2: +0.3 m/s, Heat 3: +0.5 m/s

Rank	Heat	Name	Nationality	Time	Note
1	2	Antoine Andrews	Bahamas	13.39	Q
2	1	Matthew Sophia	Netherlands	13.43	Q, NU20R
3	2	Malik Mixon	United States	13.52	Q, PB
4	2	Mitchell Lightfoot	Australia	13.57	q
5	1	Demario Prince	Jamaica	13.58	Q, PB
6	1	Enzo Diessl	Austria	13.58	q, NU20R
7	2	Sisínio Ambriz	Portugal	13.60	NU20R
8	2	Thiago Ornelas	Brazil	13.62 [.616]	
9	3	Tayleb Willis	Australia	13.62 [.617]	Q
10	1	Štěpán Schubert	Czech Republic	13.65	
11	3	Bogdan Vidojković	Serbia	13.70	Q
12	2	Kherrafi Moncif	Algeria	13.72	PB
13	3	Manuel Mordi	Germany	13.73	
14	3	Dishaun Lamb	Jamaica	13.76 [.756]	
15	1	Markus Moberg	Sweden	13.76 [.757]	PB
16	3	Carter Birade	Canada	13.78	
17	3	TJ Caldwell	United States	13.79	
18	1	Christos-Panagiotis Roumtsios	Greece	13.86	
19	1	Yuan-Kai Hsieh	Chinese Taipei	13.90	
20	3	Oscar Dugue	France	14.02	
21	2	Šimon Weiser	Czech Republic	14.03	
22	3	Elvin Yap Zhi Xian	Malaysia	14.92	
23	1	Issiah Patrick	Grenada	15.08	
	2	Denmar Jacobs	South Africa	DQ	

=== Final ===
The final was started at 17:59 on 3 August. The results were as follows:

Wind: +0.2 m/s

Rank	Lane	Name	Nationality	Time	Note
1st place, gold medalist(s)	4	Antoine Andrews	Bahamas	13.23	WU20L
2nd place, silver medalist(s)	5	Malik Mixon	United States	13.27	PB
3rd place, bronze medalist(s)	6	Matthew Sophia	Netherlands	13.34	NU20R
4	2	Mitchell Lightfoot	Australia	13.48	PB
5	1	Enzo Diessl	Austria	13.54 [.538]	NU20R
5	3	Tayleb Willis	Australia	13.54 [.538]	SB
7	8	Bogdan Vidojković	Serbia	13.81	
	7	Demario Prince	Jamaica	DNF	
