= 2018 IAAF World U20 Championships – Men's javelin throw =

Men's javelin throw at the 2018 World U20 Championships
- Venue: Ratina Stadium
- Dates: 13 July (qualification); 14 July (final)
- Competitors: 26 from 19 nations
- Winning distance: 75.31 m

Medalists
gold medal	Nash Lowis	Australia
silver medal	Tzuriel Pedigo	United States
bronze medal	Maurice Voigt	Germany

The men's javelin throw at the 2018 IAAF World U20 Championships was held at Ratina Stadium on 13 and 14 July.

== Records ==
Standing records prior to the 2018 IAAF World U20 Championships in Athletics
World U20 Record	Neeraj Chopra (IND)	86.48	Bydgoszcz, Poland	23 July 2016
Championship Record	Neeraj Chopra (IND)	86.48	Bydgoszcz, Poland	23 July 2016
World U20 Leading	Anro van Eeden (RSA)	77.59	Paarl, South Africa	6 April 2018

== Results ==
=== Qualification ===
The qualification round took place on 13 July, in two groups, with Group A starting at 09:30 and Group B starting at 10:45. Athletes attaining a mark of at least 72.00 metres( Q ) or at least the 12 best performers ( q ) qualified for the final.

Rank	Group	Name	Nationality	Round			Mark	Notes
Rank	Group	Name	Nationality	1	2	3	Mark	Notes
1	B	Nash Lowis	Australia	74.38			74.38	Q, PB
2	A	Kristaps Jaunpujens	Latvia	73.93			73.93	Q, PB
3	A	Teemu Narvi	Finland	71.47	73.52		73.52	Q
4	A	Tzuriel Pedigo	United States	73.25			73.25	Q, PB
5	B	Sahil Silwal	India	73.22			73.22	Q
6	B	Anro van Eeden	South Africa	70.04	68.88	72.22	72.22	Q
7	B	Maurice Voigt	Germany	71.49	66.00	66.94	71.49	q, PB
8	B	Oleksiy Lepel	Ukraine	67.45	70.91	68.56	70.91	q, PB
9	B	Simon Wieland	Switzerland	69.95	x	70.84	70.84	q, PB
10	B	Pedro Henrique Rodrigues	Brazil	69.71	68.77	x	69.71	q
11	A	Jakob Nauck	Germany	67.79	65.92	69.60	69.60	q, PB
12	A	Liu Zhekai	China	62.03	66.24	69.01	69.01	q
13	A	Nikolay Orlov	Authorised Neutral Athletes	68.30	63.63	68.88	68.88	
14	B	Alexandru Stefan Grigore	Romania	x	68.75	67.04	68.75	
15	A	Pavlo Paliy	Ukraine	68.41	67.40	x	68.41	
16	A	Cameron McEntyre	Australia	63.45	67.25	68.19	68.19	
17	B	Tom Egbers	Netherlands	65.42	x	67.86	67.86	
18	A	Leandro Ramos	Portugal	67.78	x	67.09	67.78	
19	A	Toygar İsmet Pekbak	Turkey	65.41	x	67.18	67.18	
20	B	Krišjanis Suntažs	Latvia	59.29	66.69	x	66.69	
21	B	Tyriq Horsford	Trinidad and Tobago	61.44	64.90	62.35	64.90	
22	A	Oskar Trejgo	Poland	x	x	63.58	63.58	
23	A	Arshdeep Singh	India	61.62	62.56	63.05	63.05	
24	A	Luiz Mauricio da Silva	Brazil	60.74	57.37	60.28	60.74	
25	B	Masafumi Azechi	Japan	59.38	56.02	60.56	60.56	
26	B	Taran Taylor	United States	x	59.23	60.36	60.36	

=== Final ===
The final was held on 14 July at 15:24.

Rank	Name	Nationality	Round						Mark	Notes
Rank	Name	Nationality	1	2	3	4	5	6	Mark	Notes
1st place, gold medalist(s)	Nash Lowis	Australia	67.75	69.77	73.47	72.66	75.31	67.64	75.31	PB
2nd place, silver medalist(s)	Tzuriel Pedigo	United States	71.46	70.30	70.98	68.96	73.27	73.76	73.76	PB
3rd place, bronze medalist(s)	Maurice Voigt	Germany	73.44	65.49	67.94	69.54	x	65.88	73.44	PB
4	Sahil Silwal	India	71.01	69.71	x	x	x	72.83	72.83	
5	Pedro Henrique Rodrigues	Brazil	68.38	67.68	x	72.34	x	72.44	72.44	
6	Teemu Narvi	Finland	70.04	70.95	71.50	71.71	70.85	70.47	71.71	
7	Jakob Nauck	Germany	69.78	69.22	70.91	65.86	65.62	67.53	70.91	PB
8	Simon Wieland	Switzerland	64.31	x	70.51	62.66	63.04	60.47	70.51	
9	Kristaps Jaunpujens	Latvia	67.94	x	64.63				67.94	
10	Liu Zhekai	China	64.95	67.21	67.90				67.90	
11	Anro van Eeden	South Africa	65.08	65.51	63.34				65.51	
12	Oleksiy Lepel	Ukraine	62.98	x	x				62.98	
