= Nash Lowis =

Australian athlete

Personal information
- Nationality: Australian
- Born: 6 November 1999 (age 26) Townsville, Queensland, Australia
- Height: 1.96 m (6 ft 5 in)
- Weight: 102 kg (225 lb)

Sport
- Sport: Track and Field
- Event: Javelin

Achievements and titles
- Personal best(s): Javelin: 82.40 m (Geneva, 2024)
Medal record
Men's athletics
Representing Australia
World U20 Championships
Gold medal – first place	2018 Tampere	Javelin
Oceania Athletics Championships
Gold medal – first place	2024 Suva	Javelin throw
Gold medal – first place	2019 Townsville	Javelin throw

Nash Lowis (born 6 November 1999) is an Australian javelin thrower. He was the gold medalist at the 2018 IAAF World U20 Championships, and a two-time winner of the Oceania Athletics Championships.

== Biography ==
Lowis is from Charters Towers, Queensland. In March 2018, Lowis placed second in the javelin throw at the Australian Trials, behind Cameron McEntyre. Lowis subsequently won the gold medal at the 2018 IAAF World U20 Championships in Tampere, Finland, with a personal best throw of 75.31 metres. He had previously increased his personal best to 74.38 metres to qualify for the final.

Lowis increased his personal best to 80.10m on June 1, 2019 in Townsville, Queensland, before winning the gold medal at the 2019 Oceania Athletics Championships in the same city on June 26, with a championship record 79.10m.

In June 2024, he was the gold medalist at the 2024 Oceania Athletics Championships in Suva, Fiji, throwing a championship record 79.67 metres to finish ahead of Cameron McEntyre. Later that month, Lowis set a new personal best with a throw of 82.40 metres whilst competing in Geneva, Switzerland.
