= Samantha Dale =

Australian long jumper (born 2001)

Personal information
- Nationality: Australian
- Born: 30 June 2001 (age 25)

Sport
- Sport: Athletics
- Event: Long jump

Achievements and titles
- Personal best(s): Long jump: 6.71m (Melbourne, 2023)
Medal record
Women's athletics
Representing Australia
Oceania Championships
Gold medal – first place	2024 Suva	Long jump
Silver medal – second place	2022 Mackay	Long jump

Samantha Dale (born 30 June 2001) is an Australian long jumper. She is a two-time winner of the Australian Athletics Championships and was a gold medalist at the 2024 Oceania Athletics Championships. She has represented Australia at the World Athletics Championships and the Commonwealth Games.

== Career ==
She jumped 6.72 metres at the Melbourne Track Classic in March 2022, but there was no recorded wind mark. She won the 2021–22 Australian Athletics Championships long jump title for the first time in Sydney in 2022, with a jump of 6.45 metres. She competed for Australia at the 2022 Commonwealth Games in Birmingham, England, placing tenth in the final with a jump of 6.32 metres (+1.1).

She jumped 6.71 metres in Melbourne in February 2023 as she beat 2021 Olympic finalists Tara Davis-Woodhall and Brooke Buschkuehl to win the Maurie Plant Meet. She competed at the 2023 World Athletics Championships in Budapest, Hungary.

She won the gold medal at the 2024 Oceania Athletics Championships in Suva, Fiji in June 2024 with a jump of 6.47 metres.

She won the Australian Athletics Championships for a second time in Perth in 2025, jumping 6.45m (+2.3) jump to secure the win ahead of the previous year’s World Under-20 champion Delta Amidzovski. She was selected for the 2025 Summer World University Games in Bochum, Germany, where she qualified for the final with a leap of 6.38m (-0.7) before placing seventh overall.

In September 2025, she competed at the 2025 World Championships in Tokyo, Japan.
