= Tayleb Willis =

Australian athlete (born 2003)

Personal information
- Nationality: Australian
- Born: 18 March 2003 (age 23)

Sport
- Sport: Athletics
- Event: Hurdles

Achievements and titles
- Personal bests: 100m hurdles: 13.56 (Suva, 2024)
Medal record
Men's athletics
Representing Australia
Oceania Championships
Gold medal – first place	2024 Suva	100m hurdles

Tayleb Willis (born 18 March 2003) is an Australian hurdler. In 2024 he became Oceania champion in the 110m hurdles.

== Biography ==
Willis was ranked first in the world in 2020 for the U18 110m Hurdles. He placed fifth in the 110m hurdles at the 2022 World Athletics U20 Championships in Cali, Colombia.

After finishing fourth at the 2022-2023 Australian Athletics Championships he began to be trained and mentored by Kyle Vander-Kuyp, Sam Leslie and John Steffensen.

Willis was runner-up at the 2024 Australian Athletics Championships, finishing in a time of 13.62 seconds. He won gold at the 2024 Oceania Athletics Championships in Suva, Fiji with a personal best time of 13.56 seconds. He competed in the 110m hurdles at the 2024 Paris Olympics.

== Personal life ==
From Melbourne, he is one of four children born to his mother Christine. As a youngster he tried swimming, karate, ballet and gymnastics before focusing on athletics. He was also in youth academy of Australian Rules Football team Hawthorn. He has Ghanaian heritage.
