= Mitchell Lightfoot =

Australian athlete (born 2003)

Personal information
- Nationality: Australian
- Born: 22 July 2003 (age 22)

Sport
- Sport: Track and Field
- Event: 110 metres hurdles

Achievements and titles
- Personal best: 110m hurdles: 13.53 (2025)
Medal record
Men's athletics
Representing Australia
Oceania Championships
Gold medal – first place	2026 Darwin	110m hurdles
Pacific Games
Gold medal – first place	2023 Honiara	110m hurdles

Mitchell Lightfoot (born 22 July 2003) is an Australian track and field athlete. In 2023, he became Australian national champion and won gold at the 2023 Pacific Games in Honiara in the 110m hurdles and also won the gold medal at the 2026 Oceania Athletics Championships

== Early life ==
Lightfoot is from Maitland, New South Wales, where he attended Maitland High School and became NSW All School Champion in the 110m hurdles.

== Career ==
In January 2022, Lightfoot won the NSW U20 Championship title in the 110m hurdles, setting a new personal best time. He followed this up in April 2022 by winning the Australian U20 title. Lightfoot finished fourth at the World U20 Championships in Cali, Colombia in August 2022.

Lightfoot won gold at the 2022–23 Australian Athletics Championships in Brisbane, setting a new personal best time that places him inside the top-10 Australians of all time.

In December 2023, he became the Oceanic champion at the 2023 Pacific Games in Honiara, setting a new event record time of 14.19 seconds.

He won the 110 metre hurdles race at the 2025 Australian Athletics Championships on 13 April 2025, in Perth. Later that month, he set a new personal best of 13.53 seconds in Hiroshima, Japan. The following month, he equalled that best whilst competing in Osaka, Japan.

In April 2026, he placed second to Sam Hurwood in the final at the 2026 Australian Championships, in 13.64 seconds. He was selected as part of the Australian team to compete at the 2026 Oceania Athletics Championships, winning the gold medal ahead of Hurwood in Darwin, Northern Territory on 21 May.
