= Yual Reath =

Australian high jumper

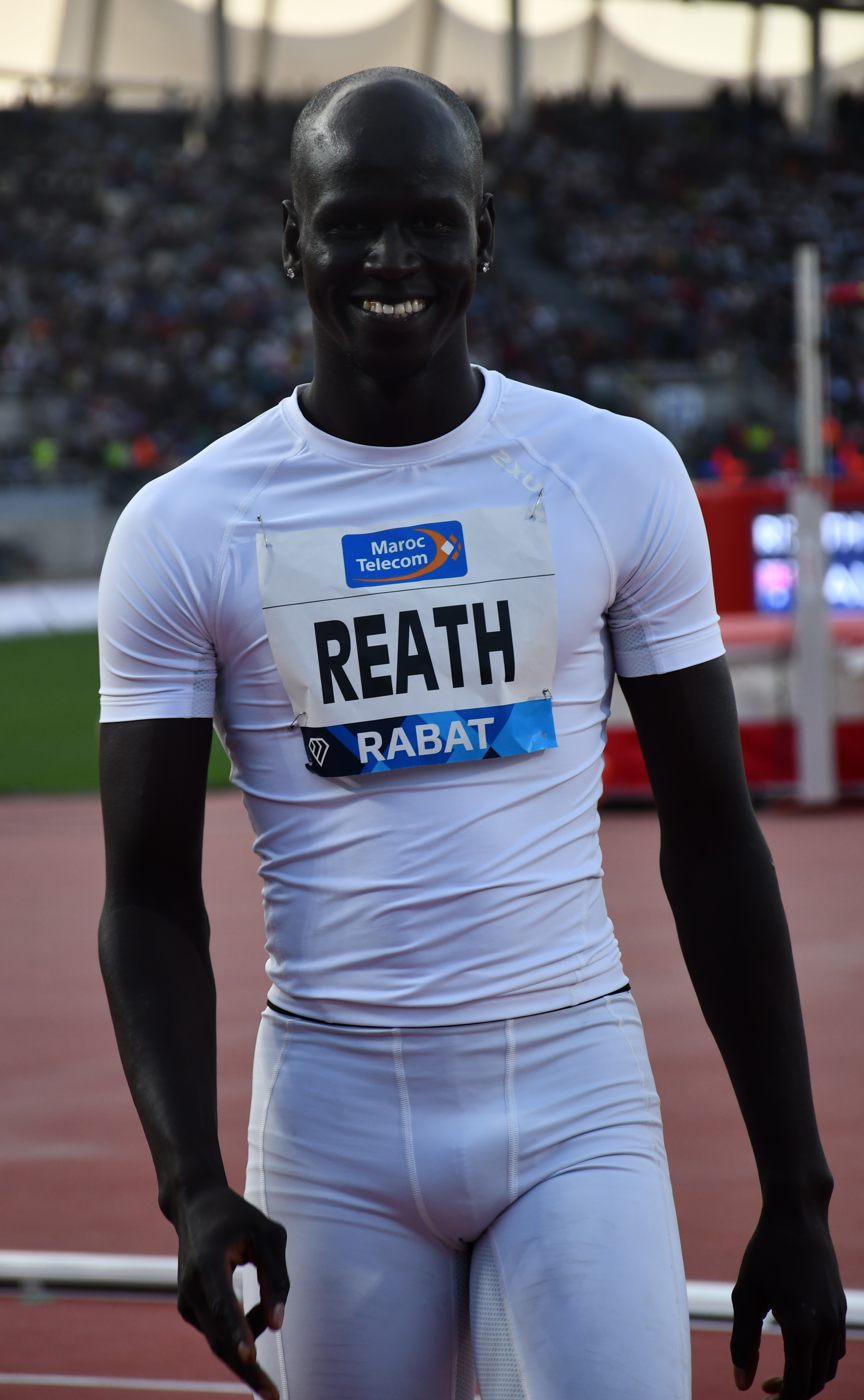
- Reath at the 2025 Meeting International Mohammed VI d'Athlétisme de Rabat.

Personal information
- Born: 18 May 2000 (age 26) South Sudan
- Home town: Ballarat, Australia
- Height: 1.85 m (6 ft 1 in)
- Weight: 67 kg (148 lb)

Sport
- Country: Australia
- Sport: Athletics
- Event: High jump
- Club: Wendouree
- Coached by: Mike Barber

Achievements and titles
- Personal best: High jump: 2.30 (2024)
Medal record
Men's athletics
Representing Australia
Oceania Athletics Championships
Gold medal – first place	2024 Suva	High jump
Gold medal – first place	2026 Darwin	High jump
- Updated on 14 July 2022

Yual Reath (born 18 May 2000) is an Australian high jumper. A member of Australia's track and field team at the 2022 World Athletics Championships, he cleared a 2.30-metre mark as his personal best (2024). In 2022, he jumped in key competitions, winning the National title and placing second in the Oceania Championships, earning his place in the Australian team.
