= Cara Feain-Ryan =

Australian steeplechaser (born 1999)

- At the 2026 Weltklasse Zürich

Personal information
- Nationality: Australia
- Home town: Brisbane, Queensland, Australia
- Education: University of Queensland
- Height: 170 cm (5 ft 7 in)
- Weight: 55 kg (121 lb)

Sport
- Sport: Sport of athletics
- Events: 3000 metres 3000 metres steeplechase
- Coached by: Ben Norton
- Now coaching: Moreton Bay College

Achievements and titles
- National finals: 2016 Australian U18s; • 2000m s'chase, 1st (gold); • 1500m, 4th; 2018 Australian Champs; • 3000m s'chase, DNF; 2019 Australian Champs; • 3000m s'chase, 6th; 2021 Australian Champs; • 3000m s'chase, 2nd (silver); 2022 Australian Champs; • 3000m s'chase, 3rd (bronze); 2023 Australian Champs; • 3000m s'chase, 1st (gold); • 5000m, 7th
- Personal bests: 3000m: 9:00.94 (2024) 3000mSC: 9:28.72 (2023)
Medal record
Women's athletics
Representing Australia
World University Games
Gold medal – first place	2023 Chengdu	3000 m s'chase
Oceania Championships
Silver medal – second place	2022 Mackay	3000 m s'chase
Silver medal – second place	2024 Suva	3000 m s'chase
- Updated on 4 April 2024

Cara Feain-Ryan (born 5 February 1999) is an Australian steeplechase runner. She was the gold medalist over 3000 metres steeplechase at the 2023 World University Games, and her best of 9:29.60 ranks her 6th all-time amongst Australians.

== Career ==
Feain-Ryan began running in regional youth competitions as early as 2013, participating in cross country running and winning the national U18 2000 metres steeplechase title. She first represented Australia at the 2022 Oceania Athletics Championships, where she won a silver medal in the 3000 metres steeplechase. She later qualified for her first global championship at the 2022 World Athletics Championships, where she finished 11th in her heat and did not qualify for the finals.

At the 2021 Summer World University Games (postponed to 2023), Feain-Ryan kicked in the final lap of the 3000 m steeplechase to win her first international gold medal. She won her first senior national title at the 2023 Australian Athletics Championships, qualifying her to represent Australia again at the 2023 World Athletics Championships. At the world championships, she finished 7th in her heat and did not advance to the finals.

== Personal life ==
Feain-Ryan grew up in Alstonville, New South Wales, Australia. Her mother supports her athletic career, as her father died of brain cancer in 2008. In 2015, she moved from Lismore, New South Wales, to Brisbane, where she trains with Genevieve Gregson.

She received a sports scholarship at the University of Queensland, where she studied speech pathology. She struggled with injuries during her early university career. Feain-Ryan is now coached professionally by Ben Norton, and she also coaches youth cross country and middle-distance running at Moreton Bay College. Feain-Ryan struggled with funding her career, telling the Sydney Morning-Herald that the Australian governing bodies did not adequately support her.

Her cousin is Matt Ryan, Olympic medalist in rowing.

== Statistics ==
=== Personal best progression ===
3000m Steeplechase progression
#	Mark	Pl.	Competition	Venue	Date	Ref.
1	10:46.25	1st place, gold medalist(s)	Queensland Junior Championships	Brisbane, Australia	12 Feb 2016	
2	10:35.30	2nd place, silver medalist(s)	Sally Pearson Shield at QSAC	Brisbane, Australia	19 Jan 2018	
3	10:32.20	2nd place, silver medalist(s)	Coles Queensland Athletics Championships	Brisbane, Australia	6 Mar 2019	
4	10:28.16	1st place, gold medalist(s)		Brisbane, Australia	21 Feb 2020	
5	10:19.01	1st place, gold medalist(s)	Queensland Athletics Championships	Brisbane, Australia	4 Mar 2020	
6	9:55.79	1st place, gold medalist(s)	Coles Summer Super Series	Canberra, Australia	24 Feb 2021	
7	9:38.39	2nd place, silver medalist(s)	Australian Athletics Championships	Sydney, Australia	17 Apr 2021	
8	9:36.35	1st place, gold medalist(s)	Festival Of Athletics	Townsville, Australia	17 Jun 2021	
9	9:29.60	7th (Heat 2)	World Athletics Championships	Budapest, Hungary	22 Aug 2023	
