= Athletics at the 2017 Summer Universiade – Women's heptathlon =

International sporting competition

The women's heptathlon event at the 2017 Summer Universiade was held on 26 and 27 August at the Taipei Municipal Stadium.

The winning margin was 389 points which as of 2023 remains the only time the women's heptathlon was won by more than 380 points at these games.

== Medalists ==
Gold	Silver	Bronze
Verena Preiner; Austria	Alysha Burnett; Australia	Noor Vidts; Belgium

== Results ==
=== 100 metres hurdles ===
Wind:
Heat 1: 0.0 m/s, Heat 2: -1.4 m/s, Heat 3: -1.4 m/s

Rank	Heat	Name	Nationality	Time	Points	Notes
1	3	Verena Preiner	Austria	13.90	993	
2	2	Chu Chia-ling	Chinese Taipei	14.06	970	SB
3	3	Jutta Heikkinen	Finland	14.20	950	
4	2	Noor Vidts	Belgium	14.27	941	
5	3	Fiorella Chiappe	Argentina	14.31	935	
6	3	Liou Ya-jyun	Chinese Taipei	14.53	905	
7	2	Alysha Burnett	Australia	14.60	895	
8	2	Pang Yuting	China	14.71	880	
9	3	Lucia Mokrášová	Slovakia	14.93	851	
10	2	Vanessa Spínola	Brazil	15.20	815	
11	2	Dallyssa Huggins	Canada	15.54	772	
12	1	Kim Chae-young	South Korea	15.62	762	
13	1	Tresna Puspita Gustiayu	Indonesia	15.65	758	
14	1	Martine Bye	Norway	16.01	713	
15	1	Tjaša Potočar	Slovenia	17.21	573	
16	1	Brina Mljač	Slovenia	17.29	564	
17	2	Terje Kaunissaar	Estonia	18.80	409	
18	1	Ghazala Siddique	Pakistan	22.00	157	
	2	Nicole Oudenaarden	Canada	DQ	0	R168.7a
	1	Shardiela Eisden	Netherlands Antilles	DNS	0	
	3	Meg Hemphill	Japan	DNS	0	
	3	Stanislava Lajčáková	Slovakia	DNS	0	

=== High jump ===
Rank	Group	Athlete	Nationality	1.32	1.35	1.38	1.41	1.44	1.47	1.50	1.53	1.56	1.59	1.62	1.65	1.68	1.71	1.74	1.77	1.80	1.83	1.86	1.89	Result	Points	Notes	Total
1	A	Alysha Burnett	Australia	–	–	–	–	–	–	–	–	–	–	–	–	–	–	o	o	o	o	xo	xxx	1.86	1054	SB	1949
2	A	Verena Preiner	Austria	–	–	–	–	–	–	–	–	–	–	o	o	o	o	o	o	xxx				1.77	941	SB	1934
3	A	Noor Vidts	Belgium	–	–	–	–	–	–	–	–	–	–	–	o	o	o	o	xxx					1.74	903		1844
4	A	Dallyssa Huggins	Canada	–	–	–	–	–	–	–	–	–	–	–	o	o	xo	o	xxx					1.74	903		1675
5	A	Pang Yuting	China	–	–	–	–	–	–	o	–	o	o	o	o	o	o	r						1.71	867		1747
6	A	Nicole Oudenaarden	Canada	–	–	–	–	–	–	–	–	–	–	o	o	xxo	xxo	xxx						1.71	867		867
7	A	Vanessa Spínola	Brazil	–	–	–	–	–	–	–	–	–	o	o	o	o	xxx							1.68	830		1645
8	B	Kim Chae-young	South Korea	–	–	–	–	–	–	–	–	o	o	o	o	xo	xxx							1.68	830	SB	1592
9	A	Terje Kaunissaar	Estonia	–	–	–	–	–	–	–	–	–	–	o	xo	xo	xxx							1.68	830		1239
10	A	Martine Bye	Norway	–	–	–	–	–	–	–	–	–	o	o	o	xxo	xxx							1.68	830		1543
11	A	Jutta Heikkinen	Finland	–	–	–	–	–	–	–	–	–	o	o	xo	xxo	xxx							1.68	830		1780
12	A	Fiorella Chiappe	Argentina	–	–	–	–	–	–	–	–	–	o	–	xxo	xxo	xxx							1.68	830		1765
13	B	Chu Chia-ling	Chinese Taipei	–	–	–	–	–	–	–	–	o	o	o	xxx									1.62	759		1729
14	B	Liou Ya-jyun	Chinese Taipei	–	–	–	–	–	xo	xo	xxo	xo	o	xxx										1.59	724		1629
15	B	Lucia Mokrášová	Slovakia	–	–	–	–	–	o	o	o	o	xo	xxx										1.59	724		1575
16	B	Tresna Puspita Gustiayu	Indonesia	–	–	o	o	o	o	xo	xxx													1.50	621		1379
17	B	Brina Mljač	Slovenia	o	o	xxx																		1.35	460		1024
18	B	Tjaša Potočar	Slovenia	o	xxx																			1.32	429		1002
	B	Ghazala Siddique	Pakistan	xxx																				NM	0		157

=== Shot put ===
Rank	Group	Athlete	Nationality	#1	#2	#3	Result	Points	Notes	Total
1	A	Nicole Oudenaarden	Canada	13.73	13.83	13.07	13.83	783		1650
2	A	Verena Preiner	Austria	12.56	13.18	13.32	13.32	749		2683
3	A	Dallyssa Huggins	Canada	12.78	x	11.41	12.78	713		2388
4	A	Lucia Mokrášová	Slovakia	12.39	12.26	12.69	12.69	707		2282
5	A	Noor Vidts	Belgium	12.59	12.08	12.68	12.68	706		2550
6	A	Vanessa Spínola	Brazil	11.32	11.46	12.61	12.61	702		2347
7	A	Alysha Burnett	Australia	11.08	10.03	12.46	12.46	692		2641
8	B	Chu Chia-ling	Chinese Taipei	10.38	11.08	12.27	12.27	679	SB	2408
9	A	Jutta Heikkinen	Finland	11.43	12.06	12.23	12.23	676		2456
10	A	Terje Kaunissaar	Estonia	11.94	x	12.01	12.01	662		1901
11	B	Pang Yuting	China	11.70	11.14	11.69	11.70	641	SB	2388
12	B	Tresna Puspita Gustiayu	Indonesia	10.93	11.52	11.12	11.52	629		2008
13	A	Martine Bye	Norway	11.32	11.04	11.33	11.33	617		2160
14	B	Kim Chae-young	South Korea	10.02	x	10.58	10.58	567	SB	2159
15	B	Liou Ya-jyun	Chinese Taipei	9.71	10.09	10.35	10.35	552	SB	2181
16	B	Tjaša Potočar	Slovenia	9.12	9.40	9.33	9.40	490		1492
17	B	Brina Mljač	Slovenia	8.36	8.52	9.19	9.19	477		1501
18	B	Ghazala Siddique	Pakistan	7.12	6.78	7.04	7.12	343		500
	B	Fiorella Chiappe	Argentina				DNS	0		DNF

=== 200 metres ===
Wind:
Heat 1: -2.2 m/s, Heat 2: -0.2 m/s, Heat 3: -3.4 m/s

Rank	Heat	Name	Nationality	Time	Points	Notes	Total
1	3	Verena Preiner	Austria	24.82	903		3586
2	3	Noor Vidts	Belgium	25.13	875		3425
3	3	Vanessa Spínola	Brazil	25.55	837		3184
4	2	Jutta Heikkinen	Finland	25.62	831		3287
5	3	Nicole Oudenaarden	Canada	25.68	825		2475
6	2	Alysha Burnett	Australia	25.92	804		3445
7	3	Lucia Mokrášová	Slovakia	26.09	789		3071
8	2	Dallyssa Huggins	Canada	26.32	769		3157
9	2	Chu Chia-ling	Chinese Taipei	26.43	760	SB	3168
10	2	Pang Yuting	China	26.93	718		3106
11	2	Liou Ya-jyun	Chinese Taipei	27.29	688		2869
12	2	Kim Chae-young	South Korea	27.36	682		2841
13	1	Tjaša Potočar	Slovenia	27.86	642		2134
14	1	Brina Mljač	Slovenia	28.14	620		2121
15	1	Terje Kaunissaar	Estonia	28.50	592		2493
16	1	Tresna Puspita Gustiayu	Indonesia	28.52	590		2598
17	1	Martine Bye	Norway	28.86	565		2725
18	1	Ghazala Siddique	Pakistan	31.58	377		877

=== Long jump ===
Rank	Group	Athlete	Nationality	#1	#2	#3	Result	Points	Notes	Total
1	A	Noor Vidts	Belgium	6.15	x	6.20	6.20	912		4337
2	A	Alysha Burnett	Australia	5.81	6.09	5.88	6.09	877		4322
3	A	Verena Preiner	Austria	x	5.87	5.94	5.94	831		4417
4	A	Jutta Heikkinen	Finland	5.55	5.76	5.69	5.76	777		4064
5	B	Chu Chia-ling	Chinese Taipei	5.71	5.65	5.48	5.71	762	SB	3930
6	A	Nicole Oudenaarden	Canada	5.70	x	x	5.70	759		3234
7	A	Vanessa Spínola	Brazil	5.53	5.63	5.48	5.63	738		3922
8	B	Kim Chae-young	South Korea	5.36	5.61w	5.58	5.61w	732		3573
9	A	Pang Yuting	China	5.43	5.45	–	5.45	686		3792
10	B	Lucia Mokrášová	Slovakia	5.28	5.31	5.32	5.32	648		3719
11	B	Dallyssa Huggins	Canada	5.07	5.19	x	5.19	612		3769
12	B	Martine Bye	Norway	x	x	4.74	4.74	490		3215
13	B	Tresna Puspita Gustiayu	Indonesia	4.63	4.33	4.71	4.71	482		3080
14	B	Tjaša Potočar	Slovenia	4.22	4.57	4.67	4.67	472		2606
15	B	Brina Mljač	Slovenia	4.32	4.38	4.39	4.39	401		2522
16	B	Ghazala Siddique	Pakistan	x	3.93	3.58	3.93	292		1169
	B	Terje Kaunissaar	Estonia	x	x	x	NM	0		2493
	A	Liou Ya-jyun	Chinese Taipei				DNS	0		DNS

=== Javelin throw ===
Rank	Athlete	Nationality	#1	#2	#3	Result	Points	Notes	Total
1	Verena Preiner	Austria	48.61	44.14	x	48.61	833		5250
2	Alysha Burnett	Australia	46.26	42.93	x	46.26	788		5110
3	Jutta Heikkinen	Finland	43.71	x	44.91	44.91	762		4826
4	Martine Bye	Norway	39.33	43.73	39.46	43.73	739	SB	3954
5	Pang Yuting	China	x	42.40	39.15	42.40	713	SB	4505
6	Terje Kaunissaar	Estonia	42.19	38.76	40.74	42.19	709		3202
7	Nicole Oudenaarden	Canada	40.93	40.65	40.56	40.93	685		3919
8	Vanessa Spínola	Brazil	38.60	x	x	38.60	640		4562
9	Chu Chia-ling	Chinese Taipei	37.63	x	36.64	37.63	622		4552
10	Kim Chae-young	South Korea	31.86	x	35.69	35.69	585		4158
11	Lucia Mokrášová	Slovakia	32.96	x	35.04	35.04	572		4291
12	Dallyssa Huggins	Canada	32.06	30.43	34.24	34.24	557		4326
13	Noor Vidts	Belgium	30.35	31.37	30.66	31.37	503		4840
14	Tresna Puspita Gustiayu	Indonesia	30.14	x	30.20	30.20	480		3560
15	Tjaša Potočar	Slovenia	x	23.35	25.63	25.63	394		3000
16	Brina Mljač	Slovenia	23.78	23.86	22.28	23.86	361		2883
	Ghazala Siddique	Pakistan	x	x	x	NM	0		1169

=== 800 metres ===
Rank	Heat	Name	Nationality	Time	Points	Notes
1	2	Dallyssa Huggins	Canada	2:09.33	974	
2	2	Verena Preiner	Austria	2:09.35	974	
3	2	Noor Vidts	Belgium	2:15.37	888	
4	1	Nicole Oudenaarden	Canada	2:21.18	808	
5	2	Jutta Heikkinen	Finland	2:23.22	780	
6	2	Vanessa Spínola	Brazil	2:23.59	775	
7	2	Alysha Burnett	Australia	2:27.45	725	
8	2	Lucia Mokrášová	Slovakia	2:27.99	718	
9	1	Brina Mljač	Slovenia	2:28.07	717	
10	2	Pang Yuting	China	2:30.19	690	
11	2	Chu Chia-ling	Chinese Taipei	2:31.70	672	
12	1	Martine Bye	Norway	2:33.88	645	
13	1	Kim Chae-young	South Korea	2:38.27	593	
14	1	Ghazala Siddique	Pakistan	2:47.48	490	
15	1	Tresna Puspita Gustiayu	Indonesia	2:53.70	426	
16	1	Tjaša Potočar	Slovenia	2:54.22	421	
	1	Terje Kaunissaar	Estonia	DNF	0	

=== Final standings ===
The highest mark recorded in each event is highlighted in yellow

Rank	Athlete	Nationality	100m H	HJ	SP	200m	LJ	JT	800m	Points	Notes
1st place, gold medalist(s)	Verena Preiner	Austria	13.90	1.77	13.32	24.82	5.94	48.61	2:09.35	6224	
2nd place, silver medalist(s)	Alysha Burnett	Australia	14.60	1.86	12.46	25.92	6.09	46.26	2:27.45	5835	PB
3rd place, bronze medalist(s)	Noor Vidts	Belgium	14.27	1.74	12.68	25.13	6.20	31.37	2:15.37	5728	
4	Jutta Heikkinen	Finland	14.20	1.68	12.23	25.62	5.76	44.91	2:23.22	5606	
5	Vanessa Spínola	Brazil	15.20	1.68	12.61	25.55	5.63	38.60	2:23.59	5337	
6	Dallyssa Huggins	Canada	15.54	1.74	12.78	26.32	5.19	34.24	2:09.33	5300	
7	Chu Chia-ling	Chinese Taipei	14.06	1.62	12.27	26.43	5.71	37.63	2:31.70	5224	
8	Pang Yuting	China	14.71	1.71	11.70	26.93	5.45	42.40	2:30.19	5195	
9	Lucia Mokrášová	Slovakia	14.93	1.59	12.69	26.09	5.32	35.04	2:27.99	5009	
10	Kim Chae-young	South Korea	15.62	1.68	10.58	27.36	5.61w	35.69	2:38.27	4751	
11	Nicole Oudenaarden	Canada	DQ	1.71	13.83	25.68	5.70	40.93	2:21.18	4727	
12	Martine Bye	Norway	16.01	1.68	11.33	28.86	4.74	43.73	2:33.88	4599	
13	Tresna Puspita Gustiayu	Indonesia	15.65	1.50	11.52	28.52	4.71	30.20	2:53.70	3986	
14	Brina Mljač	Slovenia	17.29	1.35	9.19	28.14	4.39	23.86	2:28.07	3600	
15	Tjaša Potočar	Slovenia	17.21	1.32	9.40	27.86	4.67	25.63	2:54.22	3421	SB
16	Terje Kaunissaar	Estonia	18.80	1.68	12.01	28.50	NM	42.19	DNF	3202	
17	Ghazala Siddique	Pakistan	22.00	NM	7.12	31.58	3.93	NM	2:47.48	1659	
	Liou Ya-jyun	Chinese Taipei	14.53	1.59	10.35	27.29	DNS	–	–	DNF	
	Fiorella Chiappe	Argentina	14.31	1.68	DNS	–	–	–	–	DNF	
	Shardiela Eisden	Netherlands Antilles	DNS	–	–	–	–	–	–	DNS	
	Meg Hemphill	Japan	DNS	–	–	–	–	–	–	DNS	
	Stanislava Lajčáková	Slovakia	DNS	–	–	–	–	–	–	DNS	
