= Callum Davies (runner) =

Australian middle-distance runner (born 1999)

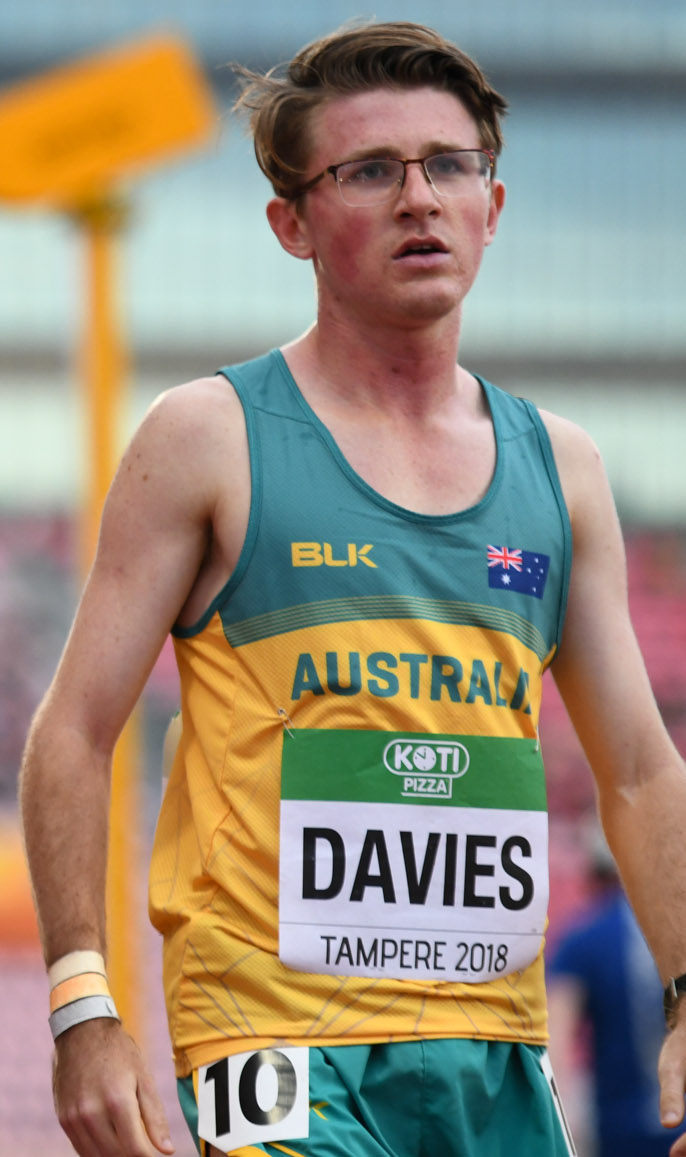
- Davies at the 2018 IAAF World U20 Championships

Personal information
- Nationality: Australia
- Born: 18 July 1999 (27 years, 124 days old)
- Home town: Queensland, Australia

Sport
- Sport: Sport of athletics
- Events: 1500 metres Mile run

Achievements and titles
- National finals: 2017 Australian U20s; • 1500m, 5th; 2018 Australian U20s; • 1500m, 2nd (silver); • 800m, 7th; 2019 Australian Champs; • 1500m, 8th; 2021 Australian Champs; • 1500m, 6th; 2022 Australian Champs; • 1500m, 3rd (bronze); 2023 Australian Champs; • 1500m, 1st (gold); • 5000m, 1st (gold)
- Personal bests: 1500m: 3:35.14 (2024) Mile: 3:55.48 (2023)
- Updated on 6 April 2024

Callum Davies (born 18 July 1999) is an Australian middle-distance runner. He won the 1500 metres and 5000 metres at the 2023 Australian Athletics Championships.

== Career ==
Davies first represented Australia at the 2018 IAAF World U20 Championships. He qualified for the finals of the 1500 m and finished 11th.

Davies achieved his first senior national podium finish at the 2022 Australian Athletics Championships 1500 m, behind Olli Hoare and Matt Ramsden.

In 2023, Davies won gold medals in the 1500 metres and 5000 metres at the Australian Championships. He became the first Australian person to win both events (including their imperial equivalents) since John Landy in 1956.

== Personal life ==
Davies is from Queensland, where he studies exercise and sport science at the University of Queensland. He is related to Hector Hogan, the last Australian to win a medal in the men's 100 metres at the Olympics.

== Statistics ==
=== Personal best progression ===
1500m progression
#	Mark	Pl.	Competition	Venue	Date	Ref.
1	3:53.32	5th	National Championships, Olympic Park Athletics Centre	Sydney, Australia	26 Mar 2017	
2	3:52.79	3rd place, bronze medalist(s)	Australian University Games at Griffith University	Gold Coast, Australia	26 Sep 2017	
3	3:50.30	4th	1500m Classic at UQ	Brisbane, Australia	1 Nov 2017	
4	3:47.89	3rd place, bronze medalist(s)	Victorian Milers Club at Albert Park. Twilight Meet	Melbourne, Australia	17 Jan 2018	
5	3:47.61	1st place, gold medalist(s)	Queensland Student Games & Allcomers	Townsville, Australia	9 Jun 2018	
6	3:46.32	4th (Heat 3-19)	IAAF World U20 Championships	Tampere, Finland	9 Jul 2018	
7	3:46.10	2nd place, silver medalist(s)	Queensland Track Classic, QSAC - State Athletics Facility	Brisbane, Australia	22 Mar 2019	
8	3:46.00	5th (Heat 2)	Australian Athletics Championships	Sydney, Australia	4 Apr 2019	
9	3:45.13	3rd place, bronze medalist(s)	1500m Classic at UQ	Brisbane, Australia	30 Oct 2019	
10	3:43.51	1st place, gold medalist(s)	Zatopek:10	Melbourne, Australia	13 Dec 2019	
11	3:40.91	3rd place, bronze medalist(s)	Zatopek 10	Melbourne, Australia	25 Jan 2021	
12	3:40.05	3rd place, bronze medalist(s)	Melbourne Track Classic	Melbourne, Australia	24 Mar 2021	
13	3:38.89	5th	Box Hill Classic	Melbourne, Australia	31 Mar 2021	
14	3:37.86	3rd place, bronze medalist(s)	Copenhagen Athletics Games	København, Denmark	15 Jun 2022	
15	3:37.78	5th	Meeting Internazionale Sport e Solidarieta	Lignano Sabbiadoro, Italy	29 Jul 2022	
16	3:37.36	10th	Meeting Internazionale Le Sport Solidarietà	Lignano Sabbiadoro, Italy	13 Jul 2023	
17	3:37.00	4th	Chemist Warehouse Adelaide Invitational	Adelaide, Australia	9 Feb 2024	
18	3:35.14	5th	NSW Milers	Sydney, Australia	21 Feb 2024	
