= Augustine Nketia Junior =

Australian sprinter (born 2003)

Personal information
- Born: 22 March 2003 (age 23) Auckland, New Zealand

Sport
- Country: Australia
- Sport: Athletics
- Event: Sprint
- Coached by: Gus Nketia

Achievements and titles
- Personal best(s): 200 m: 21.70 (Canberra, 2025); 400m: 46.19 (Sydney, 2025)

Augustine Nketia Junior (born 22 March 2003) is a New Zealand-born sprinter who competes internationally for Australia, and primarily competes over 400 metres.

== Early and personal life ==
Nketia was born in New Zealand before his family moved to Canberra in Australia in 2010. He is a member of Woden Thunder Athletics Club in Canberra and is coached by his father, Gus Nketia, the Ghanaian-born former New Zealand national 100 m record holder. His brother is Edward Osei-Nketia, who broke his father's New Zealand national record at the 2022 World Athletics Championships. He also has a sister, Elizabeth.

== Career ==
In April 2025, he placed fifth over 400 metres at the Australian Athletics Championships in a time of 46.29 seconds. He was selected for the Australian relay pool for the 2025 World Athletics Relays in China in May 2025. He competed at the event as part of the men's 4 x 400 metres relay.

He was selected for the relay pool by the Australian team for the 2025 World Athletics Championships in Tokyo, Japan.
