= Lucia Mokrášová =

Slovak heptathlete and bobsledder

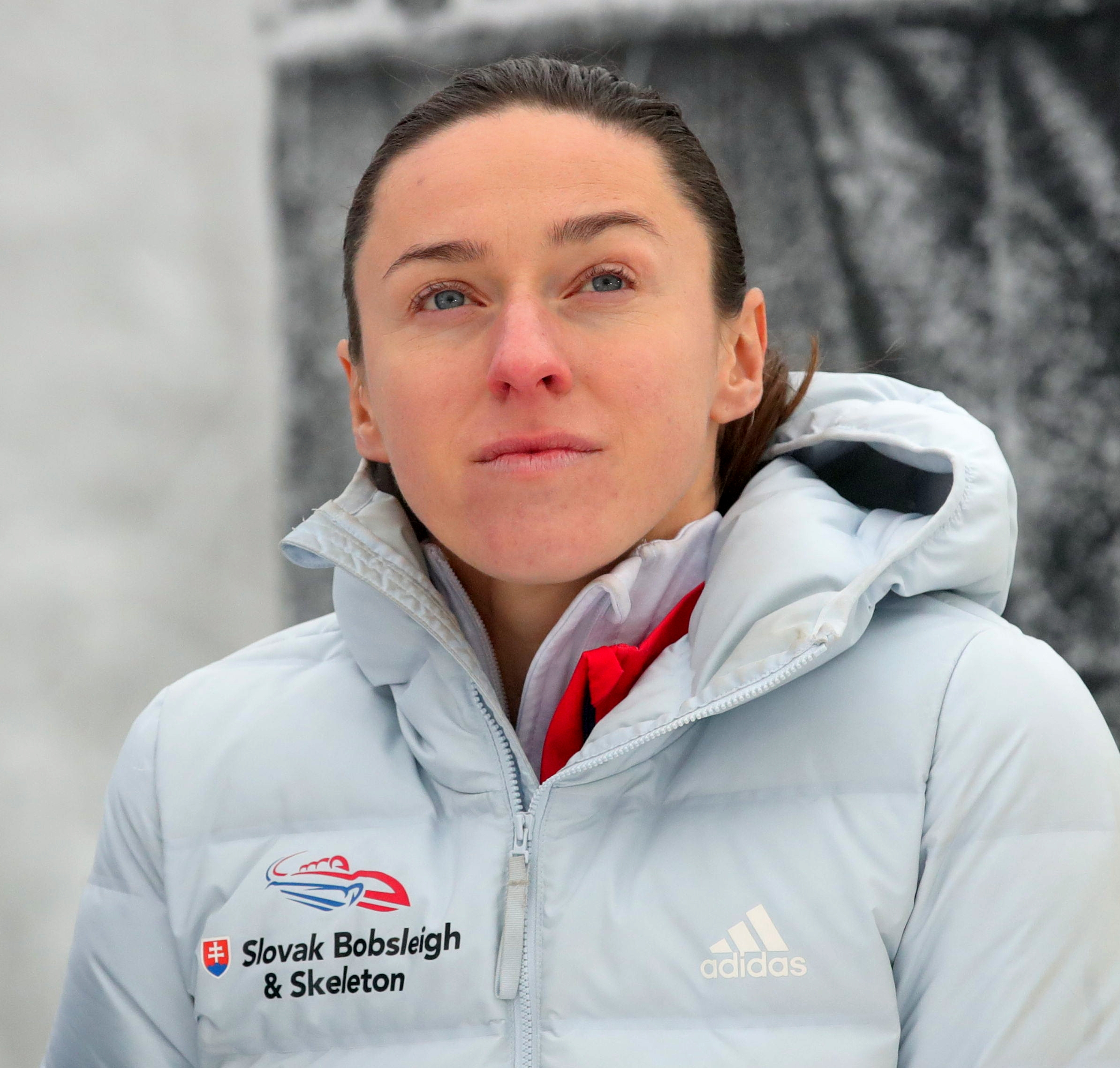
- Mokrášová at the Bobsleigh World Cup and European Championships in Altenberg, 2023

Personal information
- Born: 27 March 1994 (age 32) Ilava, Trenčín, Slovakia
- Education: University of Texas at El Paso

Sport
- Country: Slovakia
- Sport: Athletics, Bobsleigh
- Event: Heptathlon

Achievements and titles
- Personal bests: 200 m: 24.33 (July 2012); 800 m: 2:20.44 (July 2012); 100 m hurdles: 13.99 (July 2012); High jump: 1.75 (May, July 2012); Long jump: 5.48 (May, July 2011); Shot put: 11.10 (May 2012); Javelin: 33.81 (May 2012); Heptathlon: 5612 (June 2013)
Medal record
Women's athletics
Representing Slovakia
European Games
Gold medal – first place	2015 Baku	Mixed team

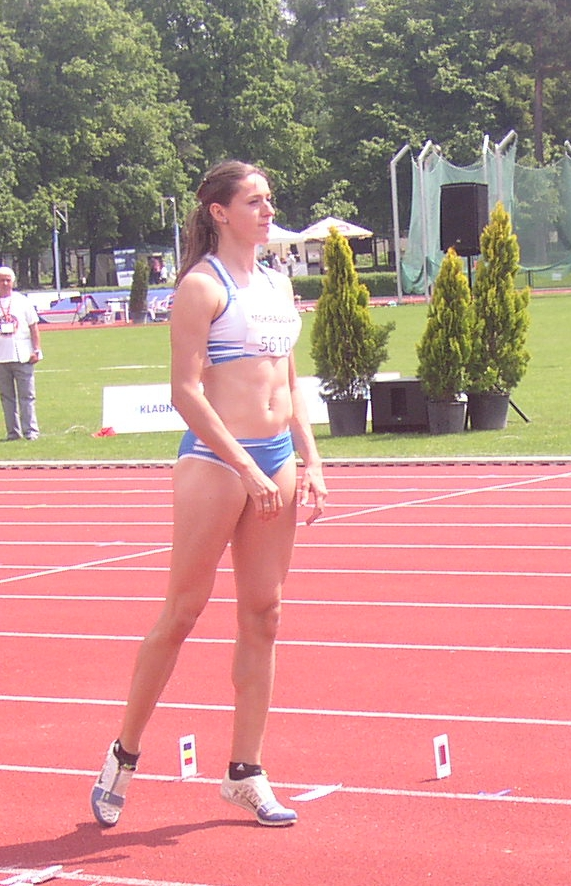
Mokrášová at the 2013 TNT Express Meeting in Kladno.

Lucia Mokrášová (born 27 March 1994) is a Slovak athlete who specialises in the heptathlon. Since 2022 she has also participated in bobsleigh as a brakewoman with pilot Viktória Čerňanská. She and Čerňanská participated in the 2026 Winter Olympics in bobsleigh representing Slovakia.

== Athletics results ==
Year	Competition	Venue	Position	Event	Notes
Representing Slovakia
2011	World Youth Championships	Lille, France	7th (heat)	100 m hurdles	14.84
2011	World Youth Championships	Lille, France	20th	Heptathlon	4759, PB
2012	World Junior Championships	Barcelona, Spain	6th	Heptathlon	5610, PB
2014	European Championships	Zürich, Switzerland	20th	Heptathlon	5736 pts
2015	European Indoor Championships	Prague, Czech Republic	25th (h)	60 m hurdles	8.48 s
2015	European U23 Championships	Tallinn, Estonia	6th	Heptathlon	5784 pts
2017	Universiade	Taipei, Taiwan	9th	Heptathlon	5009 pts

== Bobsleigh results ==
=== Olympic Games ===
Event	Two-woman
(Italy) 2026 Milano Cortina	19th

=== World Championships ===
Event	Two-woman
(Switzerland) 2023 St. Moritz	14th
(Germany) 2024 Winterberg	16th
