= Ellie Sanford =

Australian athlete

Personal information
- Nationality: Australia
- Born: 13 November 1997 (age 28)

Sport
- Sport: Athletics
- Event(s): 400m, 800m

Achievements and titles
- Personal best(s): 400m: 55.13 (Melbourne, 2021); 800m: 2:00.50 (Brisbane, 2023)

Ellie Sanford (born 13 November 1997) is an Australian track and field athlete who competes over 800 metres.

== Early life ==
As a youngster, Sanford ran for Waverley Little Athletics in Glen Waverley, Victoria. After switching her focus away from athletics to her studies, she went on to complete a Bachelor of Laws / Bachelor of Commerce degree from Monash University. In 2021, she completed an internship at a law firm. In 2022 she worked part-time as a Corporate Finance Analyst. In 2023, she was admitted into the Supreme Court of Victoria as a lawyer. However, Sanford got back into running again during the COVID-19 pandemic.

== Career ==
In March 2023, Sanford ran a new personal best time of 2:00.55 to finish behind Catriona Bisset in Brisbane. The following month, Sanford was runner-up at the Australian National Championships in the 800m, again to Bisset, and lowered her personal best to 2:00.50. Subsequently, she was selected for the 800 metres at the World Championships in Budapest. She ran a time of 2:03.55 to finish seventh in her heat, won by American Nia Akins. She ran at the Diamond League event in Zürich on 31 August 2023.
