= Athletics at the 2021 Summer World University Games – Women's 3000 metres steeplechase =

The women's 3000 metres steeplechase event at the 2021 Summer World University Games was held on 4 August 2023 at the Shuangliu Sports Centre Stadium in Chengdu, China.

== Medalists ==
Gold	Silver	Bronze
Cara Feain-Ryan; Australia	Semra Karaslan; Turkey	Georgia Winkcup; Australia

== Results ==
Rank	Name	Nationality	Time	Notes
1st place, gold medalist(s)	Cara Feain-Ryan	Australia	9:46.02	
2nd place, silver medalist(s)	Semra Karaslan	Turkey	9:50.42	
3rd place, bronze medalist(s)	Georgia Winkcup	Australia	9:51.22	
4	Sümeyye Erol	Turkey	9:59.37	
5	Patrycja Kapała	Poland	9:59.93	
6	Luo Xia	China	10:04.41	
7	Sibylle Häring	Switzerland	10:06.13	
8	Linda Palumbo	Italy	10:13.48	
9	Veerle Bakker	Netherlands	10:15.97	
10	Pauline Meyer	Germany	10:17.12	
11	Xu Shuangshuang	China	10:24.15	
12	Kim Bödi	Germany	10:28.51	
13	Susmita Tigga	India	11:10.77	
–	Bhagyashree Navale	India	DNF	
–	Tiana Huang-Cabrera	Northern Mariana Islands	DNS	
