= Sam Hurwood =

Australian athlete

Personal information
- Nationality: Australian
- Born: 7 March 2001 (age 25)

Sport
- Sport: Track and Field
- Event: 110 metres hurdles

Achievements and titles
- Personal best: 110m hurdles 13.52 (2026)
Medal record
Men's athletics
Representing Australia
Oceania Championships
Silver medal – second place	2026 Darwin	110m hurdles
Bronze medal – third place	2022 Mackay	110m hurdles

Sam Hurwood (born 7 March 2001) is an Australian high hurdler. He won the 110 metres hurdles at the Australian Athletics Championships in 2026.

== Biography ==
From Queensland, he attended Anglican Church Grammar School, graduating in 2018. Coached by Rajeev Balakrishnan, Hurwood won the high hurdles and men's 4 x 100 m relay gold medals at the 2019 Oceania U20 Championships.

Hurwood won the bronze medal at the senior 2022 Oceania Athletics Championships in the 110 metres hurdles and moved to seventh on the Australian all-time list in the 110m hurdles with a 13.63 personal best in 2022, gaining his first international victory that year in England on an Australian athletics development tour.

In April 2026, he placed won the final of the 110 metres hurdles at the 2026 Australian Championships, in 13.52 seconds ahead of Mitchell Lightfoot. He was selected as part of the Australian team to compete at the 2026 Oceania Athletics Championships, winning the silver medal behind Lightfoot in Darwin, Northern Territory on 21 May.
