= Erin Shaw =

Australian high jumper (born 2004)

Personal information
- Nationality: Australian
- Born: 7 September 2004 (age 21)

Sport
- Sport: Athletics
- Event: High jump

Achievements and titles
- Personal best(s): High jump: Outdoors 1.88m (Cali, 2022); High jump: Indoors 1.90m (Hustopeče, 2023)

Erin Shaw (born 7 September 2004) is an Australian track and field athlete who specialises in high jump. She won the high jump competition at the 2022 Oceania Athletics Championships.

== Early life ==
Based in Sydney, Shaw spent part of her childhood living in Germany, where her family relocated due to her father's professional commitments. Shaw attended Roseville College in Sydney from Years 7 to 12, graduating in 2022. Throughout her high school years, she consistently excelled in athletics, breaking numerous records at the Independent Girls' Schools Association (IGSA) competitions—particularly in high jump and swimming. By the age of 15, she was already clearing heights of 1.77 metres in the high jump. In her final year, she was appointed Sports Captain in recognition of her leadership and athletic achievements. As of 2023, Shaw is pursuing a Bachelor of Exercise and Sport Science/Advanced Studies at the University of Sydney.

== Career ==
Shaw was named in the team for the 2021 World Athletics Championships but the Australian team did not travel due to the ongoing COVID-19 pandemic. She won the high jump competition at the 2022 Oceania Athletics Championships.

Shaw set a new personal best height of 1.85 metres in June 2022. Competing at the 2022 World Athletics U20 Championships in Cali, Colombia in August 2022, Shaw was placed fourth with a clearance of 1.88m. As well as a new personal best, it was the highest jump by an Australian junior for 17 years.

In February 2023, she cleared 1.90m indoors in Hustopeče. The following week, she cleared that height again in Udine. She made her senior World Championship debut in August 2023, at the 2023 World Athletics Championships in Budapest, clearing 1.80 metres.

She was selected for the 2025 Summer World University Games in Germany.
