= Jake Doran (athlete) =

Australian sprinter (born 2000)

Personal information
- Born: 18 July 2000 (age 26) Sydney, New South Wales, Australia
- Height: 1.85 m (6 ft 1 in)
- Weight: 80 kg (176 lb)

Sport
- Sport: Athletics
- Events: 100 metres, 200 metres

Achievements and titles
- Personal bests: 100 m: 10.15 (2018); 200 m: 20.76 (2019)
Medal record
Men's athletics
Representing Australia
Oceania Championships
Gold medal – first place	2022 Mackay	100 m
Gold medal – first place	2019 Townsville	4 × 100 m relay
Silver medal – second place	2019 Townsville	100 m
Bronze medal – third place	2022 Mackay	200 m
Commonwealth Youth Games
Gold medal – first place	2017 Nassau	Mixed 4 × 100 m relay

Jake Doran (born 18 July 2000) is an Australian athlete who competes as a sprinter. In 2022 he became Australian national champion over 100 metres and represented Australia at the World Athletics Championships and Commonwealth Games.

== Early life ==
From Townsville, Jake attended Townsville Grammar School. As a junior, Doran won a gold medal in the mixed 4 x 100 metres relay at the 2017 Commonwealth Youth Games in the Bahamas, and broke the Australian junior 100m record with a 10.15 second run in Finland in July 2018 before representing Australia at the 2018 IAAF World U20 Championships in Tampere, Finland.

== Career ==
Doran won the gold medal in the 100 metres and bronze in the 200 metres at the 2022 Oceania Athletics Championships, having previously won the silver medal at the 2019 Oceania Athletics Championships in the 100 m. He also became national champion over 100 metres in 2022, winning ahead of Eddie Nketia with a wind-assisted time of 10.05 seconds. Doran subsequently represented Australia at the 2022 World Athletics Championships as well as the Commonwealth Games in 2022, reaching the semi-finals in Birmingham, England.

In 2023, Doran won the national 200m title at the Australian Athletics Championships and later competed at the 2023 World Athletics Championships in Budapest in the 100m.

In January 2024, he set a new stadium record of 10.40 seconds for the 100 meters at the Cook Classic in Whanganui, beating the 24-year-old record of Gus Nketia.
