= Rosie Elliott =

New Zealand athlete

Personal information
- Born: 6 November 1997 (age 29)

Sport
- Sport: Track and Field
- Events: 100m, 200m, 400m

Achievements and titles
- Personal bests: 100 meters: 11.57 (Hastings, 2022); 200 meters: 22.81 (Christchurch, 2023) NR; 400 meters: 52.16 (Whanganui, 2023)

Rosie Elliott (born 6 November 1997) is a New Zealand sprinter who represented NZ at the 2022 and 2023 World Athletics Championships. She is the national record holder over 200 metres and has also won national and Oceania titles at 400 metres.

== Biography ==
Elliott was a promising junior athlete but stepped away from the sport for a time having moved to study anatomy at the University of Otago in Dunedin. In October 2019 having returned to the track, Elliott ran 11.68s for 100 metres, her first time under 12 seconds, and a time which placed her second in the New Zealand national rankings behind Zoe Hobbs. In 2020, Elliott won silver medals at the New Zealand national championships in both the 100m and 200 metres races, before several injuries curtailed her season and hampered her into 2021 as well.

In February 2022, Elliott transitioned to the 400 metres and won the New Zealand national championships. She then won the gold medal at the Oceania Championships over 400 metres in Mackay, Australia. She also started to close in on the national 400m record. She qualified to represent New Zealand at the 2022 World Athletics Championships in Eugene, Oregon, where she ran 54.92 seconds for the 400 metres, without advancing to the semi-finals.

On 28 January 2023, Elliott ran a personal best time for the 400m of 52.16 at the Cook's Classic in Whanganui. On 19 February 2023, she set a national record in the 200m, running 22.81 at the International Track Meet in Christchurch. At the same meeting she equalled her personal best in the 100m, winning in 11.57. Elliott ran for New Zealand over 400 metres at the 2023 World Athletics Championships in Budapest, Hungry where she ran 52.88 seconds, without advancing to the semi-finals.

Elliott was runner-up over 200 metres to Georgia Hulls at the 2024 New Zealand Athletics Championships in Wellington.
