= Tess Kirsopp-Cole =

Australian athlete (born 1999)

Personal information
- Born: 2 December 1999 (age 26)

Sport
- Sport: Track and Field
- Event: 800m

Achievements and titles
- Personal best: 800m: 1:59.95 (Pfungstadt, 2025)
Medal record
Representing Australia
Oceania Championships
Gold medal – first place	2022 Mackay	800 m

Tess Kirsopp-Cole (born 2 December 1999) is an Australian athlete who in 2022 won the Oceania title in 800m and represented her country at the 2022 World Athletics Championships.

== Biography ==
From Winchelsea South, Victoria, as a junior Kirsopp-Cole competed as a sprinter and won state titles in 100m, 200m, and 400m races and became the national U17 champion in 400 metres. She also competed in equestrian events including dressage, show jumping and eventing. Unfortunately for her, she had a succession of health setbacks including a long process culminating in a diagnosis of Endometriosis in 2021, and brain injuries sustained as a result from a fall from a horse.

Kirsopp-Cole came back to fitness and won the 800 metres race at the 2022 Oceania Championships ahead of compatriot Claudia Hollingsworth, and competed for her country at the 2022 World Athletics Championships held in Eugene, Oregon.

In April 2025, she placed third over 800 metres at the Australian Championships in Perth. That year, she lowered her personal best for the distance to 1:59:95 at the Internationales Abendsportfest in Pfungstadt, Germany. She also placed third over 800 metres at the 2026 Hobart Track Classic.
