= Georgia Winkcup =

Australian athlete

Personal information
- Nationality: Australian
- Born: 9 May 1997 (age 29)

Sport
- Sport: Athletics
- Event: Steeplechase
Medal record
Summer World University Games
Bronze medal – third place	2021 Chengdu	3000 m steeplechase

Georgia Winkcup (born 9 May 1997) is an Australian athlete. She represented Australia in the women's 3000m steeplechase at the 2020 Summer Olympics in Tokyo. Winkcup ran 13th in her Women's 3000m steeplechase heat but failed to qualify for the final.

== Early years ==
Georgia Winkcup started athletics in the under 8's at the Cherrybrook Little Athletics, encouraged by her grandmother Betty Moore, a former world record holding athlete. Initially a distance runner, she started steeplechasing under her then coach Ross Forster. She won the Australian All Schools U18 2000m steeple. In 2016 she was a finalist in the 3000m steeple at the World Junior Championships.

Winkcup then studied Arts/Law and worked part-time as a paralegal. During her time at university, she joined the elite Lamp running club.

== Achievements ==
In 2016, Winkcup finished in 15th place in the final of the women's 3000 metres steeplechase event at the 2016 IAAF World U20 Championships held in Bydgoszcz, Poland.

She then competed in the women's 3000 metres steeplechase event at the 2019 World Athletics Championships held in Doha, Qatar.

In June, 2021 Winkcup resumed racing and in Queensland ran 9:57 and then clocked 9:39.27. Back in Sydney she ran two more races clocking 9:40.25 and 9:46.03 in wet conditions and qualified for the Tokyo 2020 Olympics.
