= Gus Nketia =

Ghanaian/New Zealand sprinter

Augustine K. Nketia (born 30 December 1970 in Kumasi, Ghana) is a former track and field competitor, specialising in sprinting events, who represented both his home country and New Zealand.

Nketia represented Ghana until 1991 including the 1990 Commonwealth Games. He competed for New Zealand at the 1994 Commonwealth Games, the 1995 IAAF World Indoor Championships (60m: 6th), and the 1996 Summer Olympics in Atlanta. His New Zealand Olympic athlete number is 733. He set the New Zealand national 100m record of 10.11 in 1994 and held it for 28 years before it was eclipsed by his son Eddie Osei-Nketia in 2022, and won five national titles over that distance. He coaches his son Augustine Nketia Junior who competes internationally for Australia.

== Personal bests ==
Distance	Time	Wind	Place	Date	Notes
60 m indoor	6.59	-	Barcelona, Spain	1995	IAAF World Indoor Championships NR
100 m	10.11	(+1.3 m/s)	Victoria, Canada	1994	NR
