= Bree Masters =

Australian sprinter

Bree Rizzo
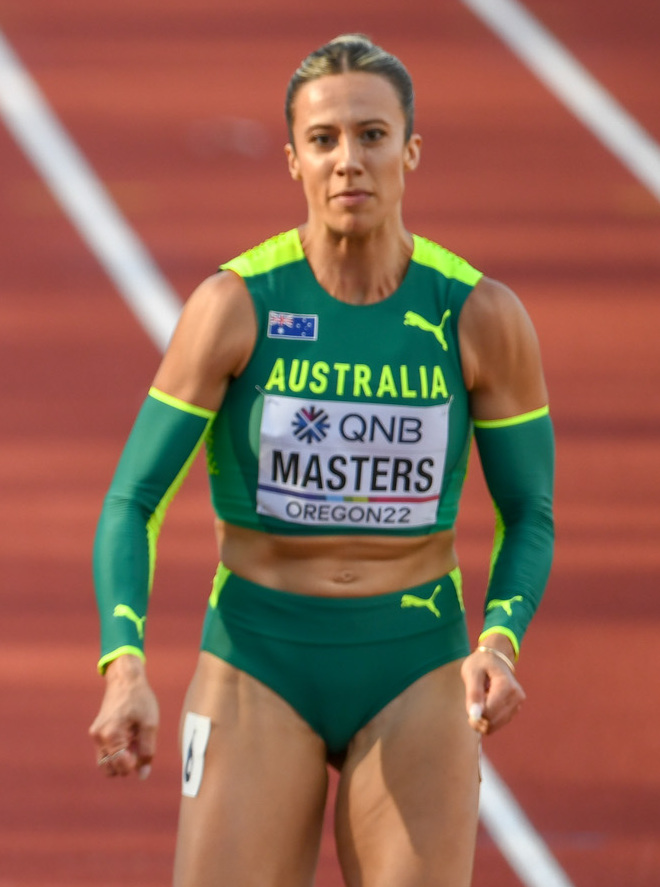
- Competing in 2022

Personal information
- Nationality: Australian
- Born: Bree Masters; 24 June 1995 (age 31) Hurstville, New South Wales, Australia
- Education: Bond University
- Occupation: Athlete
- Height: 174 cm (5 ft 9 in)
- Spouse: Matt Rizzo (m. 2024)

Sport
- Sport: Athletics & Surf Life Saving
- Coached by: Ryan Hoffman

Achievements and titles
- Personal bests: 11.23 s (100 m); 23.21 s (200 m); 42.48s (4 × 100 m)
Medal record
Women's athletics
Representing Australia
Commonwealth Games
Bronze medal – third place	2022 Birmingham	4 × 100 m relay
Oceania Championships
Gold medal – first place	2022 Mackay	4 x 100 m relay
Silver medal – second place	2022 Mackay	100 m
Bronze medal – third place	2022 Mackay	200 m

Bree Rizzo (née Masters, born 24 June 1995) is an Australian track sprinter and former beach sprinter.

== Career ==
Originally from Sydney, where she started in Little Athletics at the Sylvania Waters Athletics Track, Rizzo's primary focus was dancing. "I started dancing at age six and fell in love with it. I was selected into a performing arts high school with dreams of becoming a full time company dancer. Growing up my focus was always on dancing. I had little time to train for surf lifesaving and athletics and was always a sport I did on the side”. Aged 13, Rizzo became the youngest female to win an Australian beach sprint title and was female Youth Beach Sprint and Flag champion in 2008/9. After school, for three months Bree went to a full-time dance school in Sydney. “I didn’t like it whatsoever, I just lost my passion for dancing doing the course. It was a very strange time, I had been so keen on being a full-time dancer in a company, and all of a sudden, I was like ‘no, I want to move to Queensland and follow my running career.” So, in 2013, aged 17, she moved to Queensland's Gold Coast to pursue beach sprinting professionally. She has been coached since by Ryan Hoffman. She became Open Female Beach Sporting World Champion in 2016 and Open Female Australian Beach Sprint Champion in 2019.

Rizzo took up track sprinting in 2019. She achieved second place in the 100 m at the 2021 and 2022 Australian Track and Field Championships. At the 2022 Oceania Athletics Championships, Rizzo was also runner-up in the 100 metres, and third in the 200 metres. She qualified for the 100 m at the 2022 World Athletics Championships where she ran a then personal best of 11.29s. In the same year, she was selected for the 2022 Commonwealth Games in the 100 m and 4 × 100 m relay team. She made the semi-finals in the Women's 100 metres. The relay team, which was initially fourth with what was then Australia's fourth fastest 4 × 100 m time, was eventually elevated to bronze medal status after a member of the Nigerian team which initially won the gold medal was found to have committed a rule violation.

In 2022, Rizzo also graduated from Bond University on the Gold Coast with a Bachelor of Communications (Business) degree, majoring in marketing and public relations.

In 2023, Rizzo set a new PB of 11.23 in rain in March in Auckland and, in early April, was again a silver medalist in the 100 m at the 2023 Australian Track & Field Champions. A hamstring strain delayed her 2023 European campaign but she eventually opened it with a fast 11.25 run in Belgium in July. She again represented Australia in the individual 100 m and the 4 × 100 m relay at the 2023 World Championships in Athletics in Budapest.

In 2024, she was part to the three times record-setting Australian 4 × 100 m relay team which eventually set the year-end record of 42.48 on 20 July 2024 at the London Diamond League Athletics Meet. She represented Australia in the Women's 100 metres at the 2024 Olympic Games in Paris, where she made the semi-finals after running 11.26 seconds (+0.1w) to finish 3rd in her heat, as well as running in the Women's 4 × 100 m relay team (which finished fourth in its heat but did not advance to the final).

Rizzo won the 2025 120 m Women's Stawell Gift off scratch in 13.52 seconds.

== Personal life ==
Rizzo was married on 23 November 2024 at Merrimac, Queensland.

== Athletics achievements ==
Information from her World Athletics profile unless otherwise noted.

=== Personal bests ===
Type	Distance	Time (s)	Wind (m/s)	Venue	Date	Notes
Individual events
Outdoor	100 metres	11.23	+1.3	Auckland, New Zealand	16 March 2023	
Outdoor	100 metres	11.23	+1.3	Auckland, New Zealand	9 February 2025	
Outdoor	200 metres	23.21	-0.7	Brisbane, Australia	19 February 2022	
Team events
Outdoor	4 × 100 metres relay	42.48	—N/a	London, United Kingdom	20 July 2024	AR NR

=== International competitions ===
Representing Australia
Year	Competition	Venue	Position	Event	Time	Notes
2022	Oceania Championships	Mackay, Australia	2nd	100 m	11.34	
2022	Oceania Championships	Mackay, Australia	3rd	200 m	23.87	
2022	Oceania Championships	Mackay, Australia	1st	4 x 100 m relay	44.06	CR
2022	World Championships	Eugene, United States	30th (h)	100 m	PB	
2022	Commonwealth Games	Birmingham, United Kingdom	12th (sf)	100 m	11.36	
2022	Commonwealth Games	Birmingham, United Kingdom	3rd	4 x 100 m relay	43.16	
2023	World Championships	Budapest, Hungary	36th (h)	100 m	11.43	
2023	World Championships	Budapest, Hungary	—	4 x 100 m relay	DNF	
2024	World Relays	Nassau, The Bahamas	5th	4 x 100 m relay	43.02	
2024	Olympic Games	Paris, France	22nd (sf)	100 m	11.34	
2024	Olympic Games	Paris, France	10th (h)	4 x 100 m relay	42.75	
2025	World Relays	Guangzhou, China	9th (h)	4 x 100 m relay	43.15	
2025	World Championships	Tokyo, Japan	42nd (h)	100 m	11.45	
2025	World Championships	Tokyo, Japan	—	4 x 100 m relay	DNF	
