= Ian Haplin =

Australian 400m sprinter (born 1993)

Ian Haplin (also spelled Ian Halpin; born 20 April 1993) is an Australian 400m sprinter.

Haplin is a member of Blue Mountains Athletics Club.

He claimed a gold medal at the 2019 Australian Athletics Championships, as part of the men's New South Wales 4x400 metre relay and has been recently selected to represent Australia in the 2019 IAAF World Relays Championships in Yokohama, Japan. Where he raced as part of the mixed 4x400m relay team, that placed 4th in their heats with a time of 3:03.53.

Haplin earned selection for the 2019 IAAF World Athletics Championships in Doha. He ran as part of the Australian 4x400m Men's relay team who placed 7th in their heats, with a time of 3:05.49s.

On 10 March 2019, he established his personal best in 400 m to 46.39.

He won two gold medals at the 2019 Oceania Athletics Championships in Townsville.
