= Cameron McEntyre =

Australian athlete (born 1999)

Personal information
- Nationality: Australian
- Born: 10 February 1999 (age 27) St Leonards, New South Wales, Australia

Sport
- Sport: Athletics
- Event: Javelin throw

Achievements and titles
- Personal bests: Javelin: 83.03m (Tokyo, 2025)
Medal record
Men's athletics
Representing Australia
Oceania Championships
Gold medal – first place	2026 Darwin	Javelin
Silver medal – second place	2022 Mackay	Javelin
Silver medal – second place	2024 Suva	Javelin

Cameron McEntyre (born 10 February 1999) is an Australian javelin thrower. He threw a personal best 83.03 metres competing for Australia at the 2025 World Athletics Championships.

== Early life ==
From Wahroonga, New South Wales, he attended Knox Grammar School. A member of Sydney Pacific Athletic Club, he won gold in the men's U18 Javelin with a throw of 72.60m at the 2015 Australian Track and Field Championships. He was selected for the 2015 World Youth Championships in Athletics at the age of 16 years-old.

== Career ==
He threw over 80 metres for the first time in 2020, moving into the top ten of Australia's all-time list for javelin throwing.

He won silver at the 2022 Oceania Athletics Championships in June 2022. He competed at the 2022 World Athletics Championships in the javelin throw in Eugene, Oregon, making a best throw of 77.50 metres. He finished in seventh place at the 2022 Commonwealth Games in Birmingham, England.

He participated at the 2023 World Athletics Championships in Budapest in August 2023, where he managed a throw of 78.10 metres.

He won the USATF Throws Festival in Tucson, Arizona in May 2024. He was a silver medalist at the 2024 Oceania Athletics Championships in June 2024, behind compatriot Nash Lowis. He competed in the javelin at the 2024 Summer Olympics in Paris in August 2024.

He threw 75.42 metres to win at the 2025 Australian Athletics Championships on 13 April 2025, in Perth.

Competing at the 2025 World Athletics Championships in Tokyo, Japan, he threw a personal best 83.03 metres in the qualifying round before placing twelfth overall in the final.

In April 2026, he won the javelin title at the Australian Championships with a throw of 77.32 metres. The following month, he set a new championship record of 80.53 metres to win the gold medal at the 2026 Oceania Athletics Championships in Darwin. He was a finalist in the javelin throw at the 2026 Commonwealth Games in Glasgow, Scotland.

== Personal life ==
He is coached by his brother Angus McEntyre in a training group which includes Mackenzie Little. He studied human sciences at Sydney University.
