= Alysha Burnett =

Australian athletics competitor

Personal information
- Born: 4 January 1997 (age 29) Wahroonga, New South Wales, Australia
- Education: Australian Catholic University
- Height: 1.82 m (6 ft 0 in)
- Weight: 68 kg (150 lb)

Sport
- Sport: Athletics
- Event: Heptathlon
- Coached by: Zsuzsanna Olgyay-Szabó
Medal record
Women's athletics
Representing Australia
Universiade
Silver medal – second place	2017 Taipei	Heptathlon

Alysha Burnett (born 4 January 1997) is an Australian athlete competing in the heptathlon. She won a silver medal at the 2017 Summer Universiade.

== International competitions ==
Year	Competition	Venue	Position	Event	Notes
Representing Australia
2013	World Youth Championships	Donetsk, Ukraine	5th	Heptathlon (youth)	5505 pts
2016	World U20 Championships	Bydgoszcz, Poland	15th	Heptathlon	5416 pts
2017	Universiade	Taipei, Taiwan	2nd	Heptathlon	5835 pts
2018	Commonwealth Games	Gold Coast, Australia	9th	Heptathlon	5628 pts
2019	Universiade	Naples, Italy	4th	High jump	1.88 m
2019	World Championships	Doha, Qatar	29th (q)	High jump	1.70 m

== Personal bests ==
Outdoor

- 200 metres – 25.51 (+1.2 m/s, Sydney 2017)
- 800 metres – 2:27.45 (Taipei 2017)
- 100 metres hurdles – 14.13 (+0.7 m/s, Townsville 2019)
- High jump – 1.91 (Canberra 2019)
- Long jump – 6.34 (+2.0 m/s, Sydney 2014)
- Shot put – 14.41 (Sydney 2021)
- Javelin throw – 48.71 (Sydney 2016)
- Heptathlon – 5835 (Taipei 2017)
