= Eddie Osei-Nketia =

Australian and New Zealand sprinter (born 2001)

Personal information
- Full name: Edward Osei-Nketia
- Born: 8 May 2001 (age 25) Auckland, New Zealand
- Relative: Gus Nketia (father)

Sport
- Country: Australia
- Sport: Athletics
- Events: 100m, 200m
- Coached by: Gus Nketia; Gary Henley-Smith

Achievements and titles
- National finals: New Zealand; 100 m champion (2019, 2020, 2022); 200 m champion (2020, 2022); Australia; 100 m champion (2019)
- Personal bests: 100m – 10.08 (2022); 200m – 20.76
Medal record
Men's athletics
Representing New Zealand
Oceania Championships
Gold medal – first place	2019 Townsville	100m
- Updated on 2 April 2026

Edward Osei-Nketia (born 8 May 2001) is a sprinter who has represented New Zealand and Australia internationally. Heholds the Australian national all-conditions 100m record with a time of 9.74 seconds with a tailwind of 5.56 metres per second which broke his own previous record of 9.84 seconds from a month earlier.

== Early life ==
Osei-Nketia was born in Auckland, New Zealand to parents of Ghanaian descent. His father, Gus Nketia, is a former New Zealand national 100m record holder; a record that Eddie broke in 2022. Eddie initially grew up in the Whangaparāoa Peninsula until he relocated with his family to Canberra, Australia in 2010 at the age of nine for better sporting and educational opportunities. While in Canberra, he attended St Edmund's College where he played rugby union along with competing in athletics events. As a teenager, he represented the ACT at several Australian national junior athletics championship events. In early 2019, at the age of 17, Osei-Nketia moved back to New Zealand to live in Wellington and finish his secondary schooling commitments at Scots College.

As a dual citizen, Osei-Nketia initially represented New Zealand in international competitions and won the 100m Australian national title at 18 years old in 2019. After Osei-Nketia was controversially left out of the New Zealand's Olympic and Commonwealth Games national teams in 2021 and 2022, he decided to cease representing New Zealand in international competitions. He briefly pursued an American football career as a wide receiver at the University of Hawaii before accepting a track scholarship at University of Southern California and officially switched back to represent Australia in international competitions in December 2025. His younger brother, Augustine Nketia Junior, is also a sprinter who competes internationally for Australia.

== Athletics career ==
In June 2019, Osei-Nketia won the 100 m at the Oceania Championships in Townsville.

On 28 September 2019, Osei-Nketia came fifth in his heat of the first round of the 100m at the World Athletics Championships in Doha, Qatar with a time of 10.24s, missing out on a semi-final berth by 0.01s. Osei-Nketia won the 2019 Australian Athletics Championships 100m in 10.22 after running a personal best of 10.19 in the semi-final.

On 27 March 2021 he ran 10.12 in Brisbane, ranking him second on the New Zealand all-time list, 0.01 sec behind the National Record set by his father, Gus Nketia, in 1994, qualifying him by ranking for the 2020 Summer Olympics, but he was not nominated.

Osei-Nketia broke his father's NZ 100m record in finishing second in the 7th heat of the 100m 2022 World Athletics Championships in 10.08 seconds (−0.3 m/s) on 15 July 2022.

Osei-Nketia transferred his allegiance to Australia on 4 December 2025 and was subsequently named in the Australian team for the 2026 World Athletics Relays (though he did not attend due to other commitments).

In April 2026, he broke the Australian all-conditions 100m record previously held by Patrick Johnson by running a time of 9.84 seconds (+2.8w) during the 2026 Mt. SAC Relays in Walnut, California, United States. He further improved that record running 9.74 (+5.6w) at the Big Ten NCAA Division I athletic conference on 17 May 2026.

== Personal bests ==
Event	Time (s)	Wind (m/s)	Location	Date	Notes
60 metres indoor	6.54	—N/a	Albuquerque, USA	7 Feb 2026	
100 metres	10.08	(−0.3 m/s)	Eugene, OR, USA	15 July 2022	
100 metresW	9.74	(+5.6 m/s)	Lincoln, IL, USA	17 May 2026	
200 metres	20.24	(+1.2 m/s)	College Station, Texas, USA	30 May 2025	
200 metresW	20.03	(+7.5 m/s)	Lincoln, IL, USA	17 May 2026	
