= Matthew Clarke (runner) =

Australian athlete (born 1995)

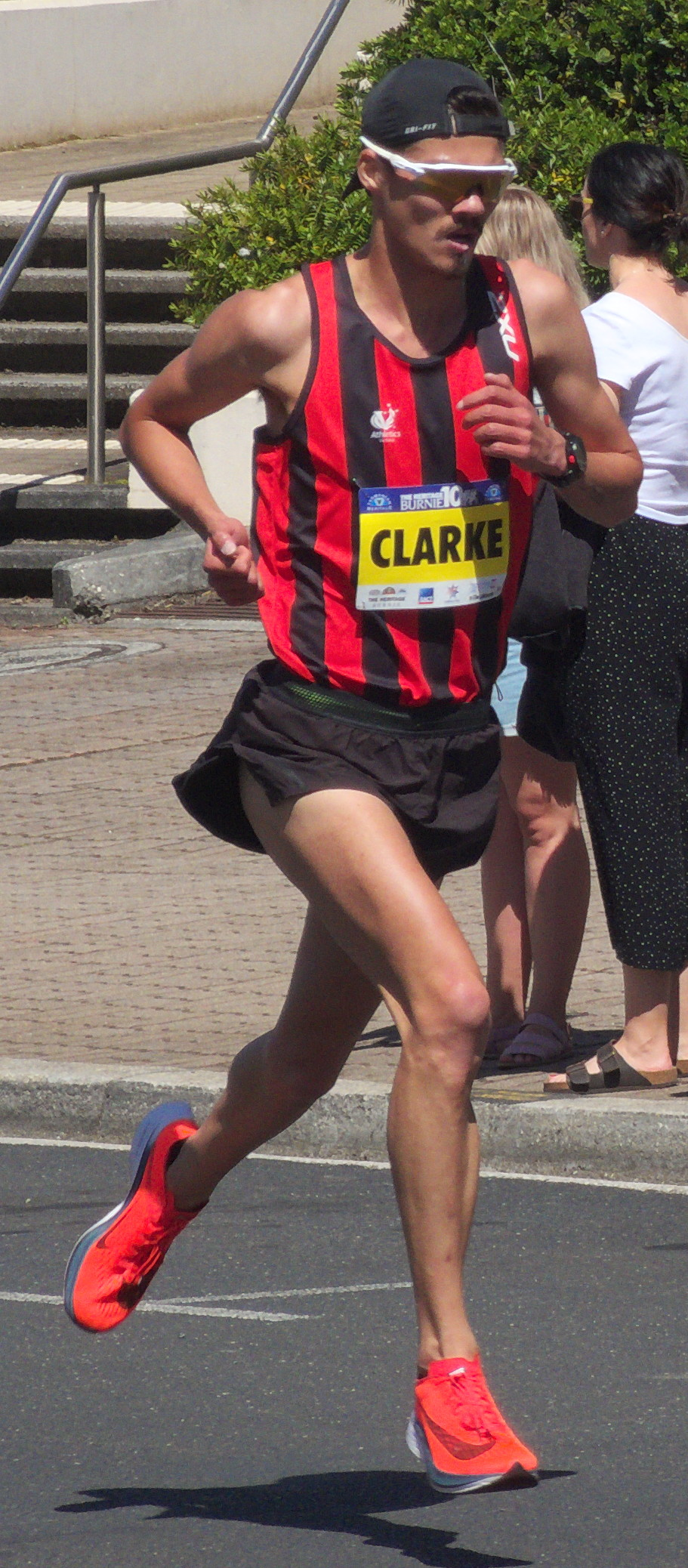
- Clarke in 2018

Personal information
- Nationality: Australian
- Born: 29 April 1995 (age 31) East Melbourne, Victoria, Australia
- Education: La Trobe University
- Occupations: Podiatrist & Professional 3000m Steeplechaser
- Height: 6 ft 1 in (185 cm)
- Weight: 64 kg (141 lb)

Sport
- Sport: Athletics
- Event: 3000m Steeplechase
- Club: Old Xaverians Athletics Club
- Team: ASICS Team Tempo
- Coached by: Adam Didyk

Achievements and titles
- Highest world ranking: 32
- Personal best: 8:20.06
Medal record
Men's athletics
Representing Australia
Oceania Athletics Championships
Gold medal – first place	2024 Suva	3000 m s'chase

Matthew Clarke (born 29 April 1995) is an Australian Olympic athlete who competes in the 3000 metres steeplechase.

== Early years ==
Clarke was born in East Melbourne, Victoria, Australia He enjoyed long distance running as a child but gave it up in year 8. After finishing school at the age of 19 he found the motivation to return. By the time he was 20 he was running around 3:49 (1500m) and 8:32 (3000m) whilst still studying Podiatry at La Trobe University. Three years later he ran 3:44 over 1500m when he came ninth at the Gold Coast Commonwealth Games trials. In June 2018, Clarke travelled to the US as a guide for Paralympian Jaryd Clifford. He raced as well and clocked a PB in the 1500m at Portland.

Clarke works as a Sports Podiatrist at the Sports and Arthritic clinic (SPARC) in Mile End, SA. He is coached by Adam Didyk as a member of ASICS Team Tempo elite. Clarke lives with his wife Annabel Kitto who is also a middle distance runner. Clarke studied Podiatry at La Trobe University.

== Achievements ==
At the age of 23 Clarke competing in a new event, the steeplechase.He ran 8:58 in January, 2019 and 8:38.68 on his second attempt in February. He was placed fifth at nationals and earned selection in the Australian team for the World University Games. Clarke came tenth in the final. He then clocked 28:39.02 for the 10,000m at Zatopek, Melbourne. (Named after Emil Zatopek, the Czech long-distance runner, it is the most prestigious track race in Australia).

On 18 June 2021 in Townsville Clarke ran a new personal best in the 3000 metres steeplechase of 8:22.62, the second fastest time ran by an Australian, in Australia and 10 seconds faster than his previous best. 7 days later, Clarke backed up to run another 3000m steeplechase on the Gold Coast in a time of 8:22.13 With that personal best it also placed him as the fifth all time Australian for the 3000m steeplechase.

Clarke qualified for the Tokyo 2020 Olympics where he competed in the Men's 3000m steeplechase. He ran fourteenth in his heat with a time of 8:42.37 and did not qualify for the final.

He competed in the 3000 metres steeplechase at the 2023 World Athletics Championships in Budapest in August 2023.

He competed at the 2024 Summer Olympics in Paris in the 3000 metres steeplechase.

Clarke was a Guide Runner for Jaryd Clifford in the men's visually impaired 5000m - T13 Category at the Paralympics 2024 in Paris.

He finished tenth in the 3000m steeplechase at the 2025 Shanghai Diamond League event in China on 3 May 2025.
