= Canada at the World Athletics Championships =

- WA code: CAN
- National federation: Athletics Canada / Athlétisme Canada
- Website: www.athletics.ca
- Medals Ranked 23rd: Gold 11 Silver 18 Bronze 17 Total 46

World Athletics Championships appearances (overview)
- 1976; 1980; 1983; 1987; 1991; 1993; 1995; 1997; 1999; 2001; 2003; 2005; 2007; 2009; 2011; 2013; 2015; 2017; 2019; 2022; 2023; 2025

Canada has participated in every edition of the World Athletics Championships since the inaugural event in 1983. Canada hosted the World Championships in Edmonton in 2001, which was the first time the event was held in North America.

== Medallists ==
Medal	Name	Year	Event
Silver	Mike Smith	1991 Tokyo	Men's decathlon
Bronze	Atlee Mahorn	1991 Tokyo	Men's 200 metres
Bronze	Robert Esmie; Glenroy Gilbert; Bruny Surin; Atlee Mahorn	1993 Stuttgart	Men's 4 × 100 metres relay
Gold	Donovan Bailey	1995 Gothenburg	Men's 100 metres
Gold	Donovan Bailey; Robert Esmie; Glenroy Gilbert; Bruny Surin	1995 Gothenburg	Men's 4 × 100 metres relay
Silver	Bruny Surin	1995 Gothenburg	Men's 100 metres
Bronze	Mike Smith	1995 Gothenburg	Men's decathlon
Gold	Donovan Bailey; Robert Esmie; Glenroy Gilbert; Bruny Surin; Carlton Chambers* * Ran in heats but not final	1997 Athens	Men's 4 × 100 metres relay
Silver	Donovan Bailey	1997 Athens	Men's 100 metres
Silver	Bruny Surin	1999 Seville	Men's 100 metres
Silver	Mark Boswell	1999 Seville	Men's high jump
Gold	Perdita Felicien	2003 Saint-Denis	Women's 100 metres hurdles
Bronze	Mark Boswell	2003 Saint-Denis	Men's high jump
Bronze	Tyler Christopher	2005 Helsinki	Men's 400 metres
Silver	Gary Reed (athlete)	2007 Osaka	Men's 800 metres
Silver	Perdita Felicien	2007 Osaka	Women's 100 metres hurdles
Silver	Priscilla Lopes-Schliep	2009 Berlin	Women's 100 metres hurdles
Silver	Dylan Armstrong	2011 Daegu	Men's shot put
Silver	Brianne Theisen-Eaton	2013 Moscow	Women's heptathlon
Bronze	Gavin Smellie; Aaron Brown; Dontae Richards-Kwok; Justyn Warner	2013 Moscow	Men's 4 × 100 metres relay
Bronze	Dylan Armstrong	2013 Moscow	Men's shot put
Bronze	Derek Drouin	2013 Moscow	Men's high jump
Bronze	Damian Warner	2013 Moscow	Men's decathlon
Gold	Derek Drouin	2015 Beijing	Men's high jump
Gold	Shawnacy Barber	2015 Beijing	Men's pole vault
Silver	Damian Warner	2015 Beijing	Men's decathlon
Silver	Melissa Bishop	2015 Beijing	Women's 800 metres
Silver	Brianne Theisen-Eaton	2015 Beijing	Women's heptathlon
Bronze	Andre De Grasse	2015 Beijing	Men's 100 metres
Bronze	Benjamin Thorne	2015 Beijing	Men's 20 kilometres walk
Bronze	Aaron Brown; Andre De Grasse; Brendon Rodney; Justyn Warner	2015 Beijing	Men's 4 × 100 metres relay
Silver	Andre De Grasse	2019 Doha	Men's 200 metres
Bronze	Andre De Grasse	2019 Doha	Men's 100 metres
Bronze	Mohamed Ahmed	2019 Doha	Men's 5000 metres
Bronze	Evan Dunfee	2019 Doha	Men's 50 km walk
Bronze	Damian Warner	2019 Doha	Men's decathlon
Gold	Jerome Blake; Aaron Brown; Andre De Grasse; Brendon Rodney	2022 Eugene	Men's 4 × 100 m relay
Silver	Camryn Rogers	2022 Eugene	Women's hammer throw
Silver	Pierce LePage	2022 Eugene	Men's decathlon
Bronze	Marco Arop	2022 Eugene	Men's 800 metres
Gold	Ethan Katzberg	2023 Budapest	Men's hammer throw
Gold	Camryn Rogers	2023 Budapest	Women's hammer throw
Gold	Marco Arop	2023 Budapest	Men's 800m
Gold	Pierce LePage	2023 Budapest	Men's decathlon
Silver	Damian Warner	2023 Budapest	Men's decathlon
Silver	Sarah Mitton	2023 Budapest	Women's shot put
Gold	Evan Dunfee	2025 Tokyo	Men's 35 kilometres walk
Gold	Camryn Rogers	2025 Tokyo	Women's hammer throw
Gold	Ethan Katzberg	2025 Tokyo	Men's hammer throw
Silver	Aaron Brown; Jerome Blake; Brendon Rodney; Andre De Grasse	2025 Tokyo	Men's 4 × 100 metres relay
Bronze	Marco Arop	2025 Tokyo	Men's 800 metres

== Medal tables ==
=== By championships ===
Games	Gold	Silver	Bronze	Total
1976 Malmö	0	0	0	0
1980 Sittard	0	0	0	0
1983 Helsinki	0	0	0	0
1987 Rome	0	0	0	0
1991 Tokyo	0	1	1	2
1993 Stuttgart	0	0	1	1
1995 Gothenburg	2	1	1	4
1997 Athens	1	1	0	2
1999 Seville	0	2	0	2
2001 Edmonton	0	0	0	0
2003 Saint-Denis	1	0	1	2
2005 Helsinki	0	0	1	1
2007 Osaka	0	2	0	2
2009 Berlin	0	1	0	1
2011 Daegu	0	1	0	1
2013 Moscow	0	1	4	5
2015 Beijing	2	3	3	8
2017 London	0	0	0	0
2019 Doha	0	1	4	5
2022 Eugene	1	2	1	4
2023 Budapest	4	2	0	6
2025 Tokyo	3	1	1	5
Totals (22 entries)	14	19	18	51

=== By event ===
Event	Gold	Silver	Bronze	Total
Throwing	4	3	1	8
Relay races	3	1	3	7
Combined events	1	6	3	10
Sprints	1	4	3	8
Middle-distance running	1	2	3	6
Hurdling	1	2	0	3
Jumping	1	1	2	4
Racewalking	1	0	2	3
Pole Vault	1	0	0	1
Long-distance running	0	0	1	1
Totals (10 entries)	14	19	18	51

=== By gender ===
Gender	Gold	Silver	Bronze	Total
Men	11	12	18	41
Women	3	7	0	10

=== Multiple medalists ===
Athletes	Gold	Silver	Bronze	Total
Donovan Bailey	3	1	0	4
Bruny Surin	2	2	1	5
Camryn Rogers	2	1	0	3
Glenroy Gilbert	2	0	1	3
Robert Esmie	2	0	1	3
Ethan Katzberg	2	0	0	2
Andre De Grasse	1	2	3	6
Aaron Brown	1	1	2	4
Brendon Rodney	1	1	1	3
Jerome Blake	1	1	0	2
Perdita Felicien	1	1	0	2
Marco Arop	1	0	2	3
Derek Drouin	1	0	1	2
Evan Dunfee	1	0	1	2
Brianne Theisen-Eaton	0	2	0	2
Damian Warner	0	1	2	3
Dylan Armstrong	0	1	1	2
Mark Boswell	0	1	1	2
Mike Smith	0	1	1	2
Atlee Mahorn	0	0	2	2
Totals (20 entries)	21	16	20	57
