= Anchor leg =

Final segment of a relay race

The anchor leg is the final position in a relay race. Typically, the anchor leg of a relay is given to the fastest or most experienced competitor on a team. The athlete completing the anchor leg of a relay is responsible for making up ground on the race-leader or preserving the lead already secured by their teammates.

== Athletics (track and field) ==
"Bullet" Bob Hayes ran anchor leg for the United States 4 × 100 metres relay team in the 1964 Tokyo Olympics. Receiving the baton in fifth place, Hayes pulled ahead of four runners to win the race. A French rival, Jocelyn Delecour, remarked to the American lead-off runner Paul Drayton "You haven't got anything except Hayes", and Drayton responded "That's all we need, pal."

Carl Lewis never lost a race when he anchored the American 4 × 100 m relay team. He regularly ran under 9 seconds for his anchor legs and helped the team break the world record in the 4 × 100 m relay five times. The record set by the U.S. at the 1992 Summer Olympics of 37.40 seconds stood for 16 years. Anchoring the U.S. sprint relay team at the 1984 Summer Olympics, Evelyn Ashford ran a reported 9.77 seconds. The U.S. team of Alice Brown (first leg), Jeanette Bolden (second leg) and Chandra Cheeseborough (third leg) won by the biggest margin in the event's history.

Usain Bolt anchored the 2012 Jamaican 4 × 100 m relay and helped set a new world record with a time 36.84 seconds.

After she placed eighth individually in the 100 m, Pam Marshall ran the anchor leg for the American 4 × 100 m team at the 1987 World Athletics Championships in Rome and beat Marlies Göhr in the final with an anchor leg timed at 10.11 s to Göhr's 10.41 s.

In some cases, athletes who are not top performers in individual events excel when given the responsibility of anchoring a relay. Phil Brown, a U.K. 400 m runner, won Olympic, World and European championship medals as the anchor leg runner for his national 4 × 400 m relay team despite never having won a medal and rarely having advanced beyond the preliminary rounds individually.

British hurdling specialist Kriss Akabusi swapped places with normal Great Britain anchor, Olympic 400 metre silver medalist Roger Black, in a race where he caught and passed 400 metre world champion Antonio Pettigrew to win Great Britain the World Championship gold in Tokyo. Due to the final legs of 4 × 400 m relay being run without lanes, the anchor may require some of the techniques normally associated with a middle distance runner, including tactical awareness, overtaking technique and physical strength to hold off other athletes, as well as basic speed.

=== Fastest anchors of all time ===
Rank	Time	Athlete	Country	Date	Place	Ref
1	8.65	Usain Bolt	Jamaica	2 May 2015	Nassau	
2	8.68	Asafa Powell	Jamaica	22 August 2008	Beijing	
3	8.78	Akani Simbine	South Africa	10 August 2024	Paris	
3	8.78	Zharnel Hughes	Great Britain	10 August 2024	Paris	
5	8.79	Fred Kerley	United States	10 August 2024	Paris	
6	8.80	Richard Thompson	Trinidad and Tobago	3 May 2014	Nassau	
7	8.83	Ryan Bailey	United States	2 May 2015	Nassau	
8	8.85	Carl Lewis	United States	8 August 1992	Barcelona	
8	8.85	Filippo Tortu	Italy	6 August 2021	Tokyo	
10	8.89	Andre De Grasse	Canada	10 August 2024	Paris	

Bob Hayes' anchor time in 1964 has been the stuff of legend for decades, but its hand clocking of 8.5 s is not the official time. With modern video reviews, it has been estimated at 9.00 s.

== Swimming ==
At the 2008 Summer Olympics in Beijing, Jason Lezak was the oldest male on the U.S. swim team. He anchored the U.S. 4 × 100 m freestyle relay team that won the gold medal and set a new world record.

At the 2012 Summer Olympics in London, Michael Phelps swam the anchor leg of the 4 × 200 m relay becoming the most decorated Olympian of all time with his 15th gold medal and 19th overall. He returned in 2016 to again anchor the 4 ×200 m freestyle relay, claiming his 21st gold and 25th medal.
