= Jamaica at the 2022 World Athletics Championships =

- Flag of Jamaica
- WA code: JAM
- National federation: Jamaica Athletics Administrative Association
- Website: athleticsja.org

in Eugene, United States 15 July 2022 – 24 July 2022
- Competitors: 65 (31 men and 34 women) in 26 events
- Medals Ranked 3rd: Gold 2 Silver 7 Bronze 1 Total 10

World Athletics Championships appearances
- 1983; 1987; 1991; 1993; 1995; 1997; 1999; 2001; 2003; 2005; 2007; 2009; 2011; 2013; 2015; 2017; 2019; 2022; 2023; 2025

Jamaica competed at the 2022 World Athletics Championships in Eugene, United States, from 15 to 24 July 2022. The Jamaica Athletics Administrative Association entered 65 athletes.

On 17 July 2022, Jamaica achieved its first medal sweep at the World Athletics Championships after Shelly-Ann Fraser-Pryce, Shericka Jackson and Elaine Thompson-Herah won gold, silver and bronze, respectively in the women's 100 metres event. The three sprinters also came from sweeping the 100 metres event at the 2020 Summer Olympics in Tokyo.

With 2 gold, 7 silver and 1 bronze medals, Jamaica ended third in the medal table, but ranked second in the overall placing table with a total of 110 points, just behind the World Team Champions, the hosts United States.

== Medalists ==
| Medal | Athlete | Event | Date |
|---|---|---|---|
| Gold | Shelly-Ann Fraser-Pryce | Women's 100 metres | 17 July |
| Gold | Shericka Jackson | Women's 200 metres | 21 July |
| Silver | Shericka Jackson | Women's 100 metres | 17 July |
| Silver | Shanieka Ricketts | Women's triple jump | 18 July |
| Silver | Shelly-Ann Fraser-Pryce | Women's 200 metres | 21 July |
| Silver | Remona Burchell*; Shelly-Ann Fraser-Pryce; Shericka Jackson; Kemba Nelson; Elaine Thompson-Herah; Briana Williams*; Natalliah Whyte* | Women's 4 × 100 metres relay | 23 July |
| Silver | Britany Anderson | Women's 100 metres hurdles | 24 July |
| Silver | Nathon Allen; Karayme Bartley*; Akeem Bloomfield; Anthony Cox*; Jevaughn Powell; Christopher Taylor | Men's 4 × 400 metres relay | 24 July |
| Silver | Junelle Bromfield*; Tiffany James*; Candice McLeod; Stephenie Ann McPherson; Janieve Russell; Stacey-Ann Williams*; Charokee Young | Women's 4 × 400 metres relay | 24 July |
| Bronze | Elaine Thompson-Herah | Women's 100 metres | 17 July |

* – Indicates the athlete competed in preliminaries but not the final.

== Team ==
On 1 July 2022, the Jamaica Athletics Administrative Association (JAAA) announced a 64-member team qualified for the World Athletics Championships, which included the American-born sprinter Andrew Hudson who was later dropped as ineligible. The final entry list published by World Athletics consigned 65 athletes for Jamaica, with Akeem Bloomfield being transferred from the 4 × 400 metres relay mixed team to the men's 200 metres event and being replaced by Demish Gaye and Rusheen McDonald.

The following athletes were part of the Jamaican team as alternates or reserves:

- Men: Jelani Walker (100 metres) and Damion Thomas (110 metres hurdles).
- Women: Briana Williams (100 metres), Natalliah Whyte (200 metres), Stacey-Ann Williams (400 metres), Demisha Roswell (100 metres hurdles) and Andrenette Knight (400 metres hurdles).

=== Men, women and mixed relay teams ===
The following were the original teams for the relay events that were announced in the final entry lists.

| Men | | Women | | Mixed |
| 4 × 100 metres | 4 × 400 metres | 4 × 100 metres | 4 × 400 metres | 4 × 400 metres |
|---|---|---|---|---|
| Kemar Bailey-Cole; Ackeem Blake; Yohan Blake; Conroy Jones; Oblique Seville; Jelani Walker | Nathon Allen; Karayme Bartley; Anthony Cox; Javon Francis; Jevaughn Powell; Christopher Taylor | Remona Burchell; Shelly-Ann Fraser-Pryce; Shericka Jackson; Kemba Nelson; Elaine Thompson-Herah; Briana Williams | Roneisha McGregor; Candice McLeod; Stephenie Ann McPherson; Natalliah Whyte; Stacey-Ann Williams; Charokee Young | Junelle Bromfield (W); Demish Gaye (M); Tiffany James (W); Rusheen McDonald (M); Gregory Prince (M) |

However, Javon Francis (men's 4 x 400), Rusheen McDonald and Gregory Prince (both in mixed 4 x 400) had no participation.

Oblique Seville was originally named in the quartet for the preliminaries of the men's 4 × 100 metres relay, however, he was pulled out due to physical discomforts and was replaced by Conroy Jones.

== Results ==
Jamaica entered 65 athletes, but only 59 of them participated.

Key

- Note: Ranks given for track events are within the athlete's heat only
- Q = Qualified for the next round
- q = Qualified for the next round as a fastest loser or, in field events, by position without achieving the qualifying target
- NR = National record
- PB = Personal best
- SB = Season best
- N/A = Round not applicable for the event

=== Men ===
Track events

| Athlete | Event | Heat | | Semi-final | | Final | |
| Athlete | Event | Result | Rank | Result | Rank | Result | Rank |
|---|---|---|---|---|---|---|---|
| Ackeem Blake | 100 metres | 10.15 (−0.1) | 2 Q | 10.19 (+0.1) | 4 | Did not advance | |
| Yohan Blake | 100 metres | 10.04 (+1.1) | 2 Q | 10.12 (+0.3) | 4 | Did not advance | |
| Oblique Seville | 100 metres | 9.93 (+0.2) | 1 Q | 9.90 (−0.1) | 1 Q | 9.97 (−0.1) | 4 |
| Yohan Blake | 200 metres | 20.35 (+0.4) | 4 q | DNS | | Did not advance | |
| Akeem Bloomfield | 200 metres | 20.56 (+2.1) | 5 | Did not advance | | | |
| Rasheed Dwyer | 200 metres | 20.29 (−0.3) | 2 Q | 20.87 (+0.3) | 8 | Did not advance | |
| Nathon Allen | 400 metres | 45.61 | 3 Q | DNF | | Did not advance | |
| Jevaughn Powell | 400 metres | 46.42 | 4 | Did not advance | | | |
| Christopher Taylor | 400 metres | 45.68 | 2 Q | 44.97 SB | 3 q | 45.30 | 7 |
| Navasky Anderson | 800 metres | 1:48.37 | 7 | Did not advance | | | |
| Orlando Bennett | 110 metres hurdles | 13.55 (−0.3) | 5 q | 13.67 (−0.6) | 6 | Did not advance | |
| Rasheed Broadbell | 110 metres hurdles | 13.36 (−0.5) | 2 Q | 13.27 (+0.3) | 3 | Did not advance | |
| Hansle Parchment | 110 metres hurdles | 13.17 (+0.2) | 1 Q | 13.02 (+2.5) | 1 Q | DNS | |
| Jaheel Hyde | 400 metres hurdles | 50.03 | 3 Q | 49.09 | 2 Q | 48.03 PB | 6 |
| Kemar Mowatt | 400 metres hurdles | 49.44 | 2 Q | 48.59 | 4 | Did not advance | |
| Shawn Rowe | 400 metres hurdles | 49.51 | 6 q | 49.80 | 8 | Did not advance | |
| Kemar Bailey-Cole*; Ackeem Blake; Yohan Blake; Conroy Jones*; Oblique Seville; Jelani Walker | 4 × 100 metres relay | 38.33 SB | 4 q | — | | 38.06 SB | 4 |
| Nathon Allen; Karayme Bartley*; Akeem Bloomfield; Anthony Cox*; Jevaughn Powell; Christopher Taylor | 4 × 400 metres relay | 3:01.59 SB | 3 Q | — | | 2:58.58 SB | 2nd place, silver medalist(s) |

* – Indicates the athlete competed in preliminaries but not the final.

Field events

| Athlete | Event | Qualification | | Final | |
| Athlete | Event | Distance | Position | Distance | Position |
|---|---|---|---|---|---|
| Tajay Gayle | Long jump | NM | | Did not advance | |
| Wayne Pinnock | Long jump | 7.98 | 9 q | 7.88 | 9 |
| Jordan Scott | Triple jump | 16.42 | 20 | Did not advance | |
| Fedrick Dacres | Discus throw | 64.49 | 10 q | 64.85 | 9 |
| Traves Smikle | Discus throw | 64.21 | 11 q | 62.23 | 12 |
| Chad Wright | Discus throw | 60.31 | 25 | Did not advance | |

=== Women ===
Track events

| Athlete | Event | Heat | | Semi-final | | Final | |
| Athlete | Event | Result | Rank | Result | Rank | Result | Rank |
|---|---|---|---|---|---|---|---|
| Shelly-Ann Fraser-Pryce | 100 metres | 10.87 (−0.2) | 1 Q | 10.93 (+0.4) | 1 Q | 10.67 (+0.8) CR, =WL | 1st place, gold medalist(s) |
| Shericka Jackson | 100 metres | 11.02 (+0.7) | 1 Q | 10.84 (−0.2) | 1 Q | 10.73 (+0.8) PB | 2nd place, silver medalist(s) |
| Kemba Nelson | 100 metres | 11.10 (+0.8) | 3 Q | 11.25 (−0.2) | 6 | Did not advance | |
| Elaine Thompson-Herah | 100 metres | 11.15 (+0.2) | 1 Q | 10.82 (−0.2) | 1 Q | 10.81 (+0.8) | 3rd place, bronze medalist(s) |
| Shelly-Ann Fraser-Pryce | 200 metres | 22.26 (+1.1) | 2 Q | 21.82 (−0.1) SB | 1 Q | 21.81 (+0.6) SB | 2nd place, silver medalist(s) |
| Shericka Jackson | 200 metres | 22.33 (+2.5) | 1 Q | 21.67 (+2.0) | 1 Q | 21.45 (+0.6) CR | 1st place, gold medalist(s) |
| Elaine Thompson-Herah | 200 metres | 22.41 (−0.2) | 2 Q | 21.97 (+1.4) SB | 3 q | 22.39 (+0.6) | 7 |
| Candice McLeod | 400 metres | 50.78 | 2 Q | 50.05 SB | 2 Q | 50.78 | 7 |
| Stephenie Ann McPherson | 400 metres | 50.15 SB | 1 Q | 50.56 | 3 q | 50.36 | 5 |
| Charokee Young | 400 metres | 51.84 | 4 q | 51.41 | 5 | Did not advance | |
| Chrisann Gordon | 800 metres | 2:01.91 | 5 | Did not advance | | | |
| Natoya Goule | 800 metres | 2:00.06 | 1 Q | 1:58.73 | 2 Q | 1:57.90 SB | 5 |
| Adelle Tracey | 800 metres | 1:59.20 PB | 3 Q | 2:00.21 | 3 | Did not advance | |
| Adelle Tracey | 1500 metres | 4:05.14 | 13 Q | 4:06.96 | 18 | Did not advance | |
| Britany Anderson | 100 metres hurdles | 12.59 (−0.3) | 1 Q | 12.31 (+0.3) NR | 1 Q | 12.23 (+2.5) | 2nd place, silver medalist(s) |
| Megan Tapper | 100 metres hurdles | 12.73 (+0.5) | 2 Q | 12.52 (−0.1) PB | 3 | Did not advance | |
| Danielle Williams | 100 metres hurdles | 12.87 (+1.5) | 2 Q | 12.41 (+0.9) SB | 3 q | 12.44 (+2.5) | 6 |
| Rushell Clayton | 400 metres hurdles | 54.99 | 4 Q | 53.63 PB | 3 q | 54.36 | 6 |
| Janieve Russell | 400 metres hurdles | 54.52 | 1 Q | 54.66 | 3 | Did not advance | |
| Shiann Salmon | 400 metres hurdles | 54.91 | 2 Q | 54.16 | 3 | Did not advance | |
| Remona Burchell*; Shelly-Ann Fraser-Pryce; Shericka Jackson; Kemba Nelson; Elaine Thompson-Herah; Briana Williams*; Natalliah Whyte* | 4 × 100 metres relay | 42.37 SB | 2 Q | — | | 41.18 SB | 2nd place, silver medalist(s) |
| Junelle Bromfield*; Tiffany James*; Candice McLeod; Stephenie Ann McPherson; Janieve Russell; Stacey-Ann Williams*; Charokee Young | 4 × 400 metres relay | 3:24.23 SB | 1 Q | — | | 3:20.74 SB | 2nd place, silver medalist(s) |

* – Indicates the athlete competed in preliminaries but not the final.

Field events

| Athlete | Event | Qualification | | Final | |
| Athlete | Event | Distance | Position | Distance | Position |
|---|---|---|---|---|---|
| Lamara Distin | High jump | 1.90 | =10 q | 1.93 | 9 |
| Kimberly Williamson | High jump | 1.90 | =10 q | 1.89 | 11 |
| Chanice Porter | Long jump | 6.29 | 22 | Did not advance | |
| Shanieka Ricketts | Triple jump | 14.45 | 5 Q | 14.89 SB | 2nd place, silver medalist(s) |
| Ackelia Smith | Triple jump | 14.36 PB | 8 q | 13.90 | 12 |
| Kimberly Williams | Triple jump | 14.27 | 12 q | 14.29 | 7 |
| Lloydricia Cameron | Shot put | 17.65 | 18 | Did not advance | |
| Danniel Thomas-Dodd | Shot put | 19.09 | 5 Q | 18.29 | 10 |
| Samantha Hall | Discus throw | 56.99 | 27 | Did not advance | |

=== Mixed ===
| Athlete | Event | Heat | | Final | |
| Athlete | Event | Result | Rank | Result | Rank |
|---|---|---|---|---|---|
| Karayme Bartley; Demish Gaye; Tiffany James; Roneisha McGregor*; Stacey-Ann Williams | 4 × 400 metres relay | 3:13.95 SB | 3 Q | 3:12.71 SB | 5 |

* – Indicates the athlete competed in preliminaries but not the final.
