= 2022 World Athletics Championships – Men's 4 × 100 metres relay =

Men's 4 × 100 metres relay at the 2022 World Championships
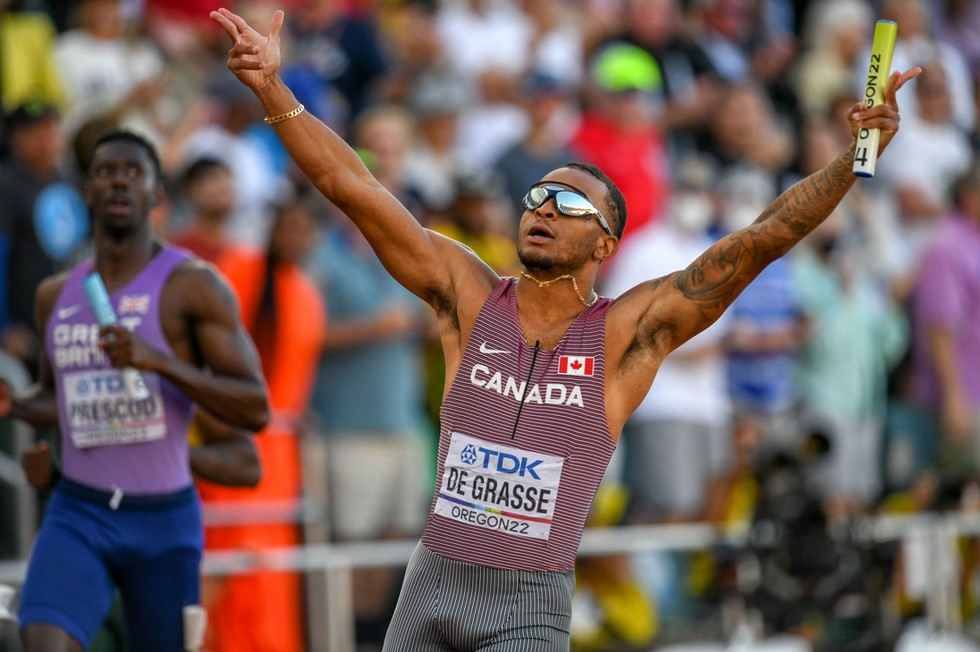
- Andre De Grasse shortly after anchoring his team to gold in the final.
- Venue: Hayward Field
- Dates: 22 July (heats); 23 July (final)
- Competitors: 95 from 16 nations
- Winning time: 37.48

Medalists
gold medal	Aaron Brown; Jerome Blake; Brendon Rodney; Andre De Grasse	Canada
silver medal	Christian Coleman; Noah Lyles; Elijah Hall; Marvin Bracy	United States
bronze medal	Jona Efoloko; Zharnel Hughes; Nethaneel Mitchell-Blake; Reece Prescod	Great Britain

Video on YouTube Official Video

The men's 4 × 100 metres relay at the 2022 World Athletics Championships was held at the Hayward Field in Eugene on 22 and 23 July 2022.

== Records ==
Before the competition records were as follows:

Record	Athlete & Nat.	Perf.	Location	Date
World record	Jamaica; Nesta Carter, Michael Frater, Yohan Blake, Usain Bolt	36.84	London, Great Britain	11 August 2012
Championship record	Jamaica; Nesta Carter, Michael Frater, Yohan Blake, Usain Bolt	37.04	Daegu, South Korea	4 September 2011
World Leading	Germany; Kevin Kranz, Joshua Hartmann, Owen Ansah, Lucas Ansah-Peprah	37.99	Regensburg, Germany	3 June 2022
African Record	South Africa; Thando Dlodlo, Simon Magakwe, Clarence Munyai, Akani Simbine	37.65	Doha, Qatar	4 October 2019
Asian Record	Japan; Shuhei Tada, Kirara Shiraishi, Yoshihide Kiryu, Abdul Hakim Sani Brown	37.43	Doha, Qatar	5 October 2019
North, Central American and Caribbean record	Jamaica; Nesta Carter, Michael Frater, Yohan Blake, Usain Bolt	36.84	London, Great Britain	11 August 2012
South American Record	Brazil; Rodrigo do Nascimento, Vitor Hugo dos Santos, Derick Silva, Paulo André Camilo	37.72	Doha, Qatar	5 October 2019
European Record	Great Britain; Adam Gemili, Zharnel Hughes, Richard Kilty, Nethaneel Mitchell-Blake	37.37	Doha, Qatar	5 October 2019
Oceanian record	Australia; Paul Henderson, Tim Jackson, Steve Brimacombe, Damien Marsh	38.17	Gothenburg, Sweden	12 August 1995
Oceanian record	Australia; Anthony Alozie, Isaac Ntiamoah, Andrew McCabe, Joshua Ross	38.17	London, Great Britain	10 August 2012

== Qualification standard ==
The standard to qualify automatically for entry was to finish in the first 10 at 2021 World Relays, completed by 6 2021-2022 top lists' teams.

=== Participating teams ===
- Italy (1st)
- Japan (2nd)
- Denmark (3rd)
- Brazil (4th)
- Germany (5th)
- Netherlands (6th)
- Ghana (7th)
- France (9th)
- Spain (10th)
- Canada
- China
- Jamaica
- United States
- Great Britain
- Nigeria
- South Africa

South Africa, subsequently disqualified for doping after the 2021 World Athletics Relays, finally replaces qualified Ukraine (8th at World Relays) which had withdrawn, as per the 7th and last time of the South African U20 team in Nairobi.

2021 Top list

1. 37.50 Italy 1 National Stadium, Tokyo (JPN) 6 August 2021
2. 37.70 Canada 2 National Stadium, Tokyo (JPN) 6 August 2021
3. 37.79 China 3 National Stadium, Tokyo (JPN) 6 August 2021
4. 37.82 Jamaica 1h1 National Stadium, Tokyo (JPN) 5 August 2021
5. 38.06 Germany 4h2 National Stadium, Tokyo (JPN) 5 August 2021
6. 38.08 Ghana 5h2 National Stadium, Tokyo (JPN) 5 August 2021
7. 38.10 United States 6h2 National Stadium, Tokyo (JPN) 5 August 2021
8. 38.16 Japan 2h1 National Stadium, Tokyo (JPN) 5 August 2021
9. 38.16 Denmark 7h2 National Stadium, Tokyo (JPN) 5 August 2021
10. 38.18 France 3h1 National Stadium, Tokyo (JPN) 5 August 2021
11. 38.27 Great Britain 1 International Stadium, Gateshead (GBR) 13 July 2021
12. 38.34 Brazil 4h1 National Stadium, Tokyo (JPN) 5 August 2021
13. 38.49 Netherlands 3 International Stadium, Gateshead (GBR) 13 July 2021
14. 38.51 South Africa U20 1 Moi International Sports Centre, Kasarani, Nairobi (KEN) 22 August 2021
15. 38.53 Nigeria 1 Yabatech Sport Complex, Lagos (NGR) 27 June 2021
16. 38.63 Trinidad and Tobago 5h1 National Stadium, Tokyo (JPN) 5 August 2021

=== 2022 Top list ===
1. 37.99 Germany 1f1 NR Universitätsstadion am Biopark, Regensburg (GER) 3 June 2022
2. 38.09 Adidas team (USA) 1f1 Percy Beard Track, Gainesville, FL (USA) 16 April 2022
3. 38.31 Canada 1 Alexander Stadium, Birmingham (GBR) 21 May 2022
4. 38.35 Nigeria 1 Samuel Ogbemudia Stadium, Benin City (NGR) 25 June 2022
5. 38.41 France 2 Alexander Stadium, Birmingham (GBR) 21 May 2022
6. 38.43 Great Britain 1 Mestský Stadion, Ostrava (CZE) 31 May 2022
7. 38.56 Thailand 1 NR Yecheon (KOR) 4 June 2022
8. 38.63 South Africa 1 National Stadium, Gaborone (BOT) 30 April 2022
9. 38.70 Netherlands 1 Olympiastadion, Stockholm (SWE) 30 June 2022
10. 38.72 United States 1f3 Hilmer Lodge Stadium, Walnut, CA (USA) 16 April 2022
11. 38.76 Liberia 1 Hasely Crawford Stadium, Port-of-Spain (TTO) 26 June 2022
12. 38.89 Racers Track Club (JAM) 1f1 National Stadium, Kingston (JAM) 26 February 2022
13. 38.89 Czech Republic 2f1 Centre sportif du Bout-du-Monde, Geneva (SUI) 11 June 2022
14. 38.90 SESI - SP (BRA) 1f3 Rio de Janeiro (BRA) 23 June 2022
15. 38.95 Italy 1 Stade Complexe Olympique, Oran (ALG) 1 July 2022
16. 38.97 Spain 1 Estadio Iberoamericano, Huelva (ESP) 25 May 2022
17. 38.98 Turkey 2 Stade Complexe Olympique, Oran (ALG) 1 July 2022

== Preview ==
- World Athletics preview (men and women)

== Team rosters ==
Each roster has 5 or 6 athletes:

=== Heat 1 ===
- Germany:
  - Owen Ansah
  - Lucas Ansah-Peprah
  - Kevin Kranz
  - Joshua Hartmann
  - Milo Skupin-Alfa
  - Julian Wagner
- Nigeria:
  - Favour Ashe
  - Raymond Ekevwo
  - Usheoritse Itsekiri
  - Godson Oghenebrume
  - Seye Ogunlewe
  - Udodi Onwuzurike
- Japan:
  - Ryuichiro Sakai
  - Koki Ueyama
  - Yuki Koike
  - Abdul Hakim Sani Brown
  - Hiroki Yanagita
  - Ryota Suzuki
- Great Britain:
  - Harry Aikines-Aryeetey
  - Zharnel Hughes
  - Reece Prescod
  - Jeremiah Azu
  - Jona Efoloko
  - Nethaneel Mitchell-Blake
- China:
  - Su Bingtian
  - Xie Zhenye
  - Wu Zhiqiang
  - Tang Xingqiang
  - Chen Guanfeng
  - Deng Zhijiang
- the Netherlands:
  - Joris van Gool
  - Raphael Bouju
  - Xavi Mo-Ajok
  - Elvis Afrifa
  - Hensley Paulina
  - Taymir Burnet
- United States:
  - Trayvon Bromell
  - Marvin Bracy
  - Fred Kerley (r)
  - Elijah Hall
  - Josephus Lyles
  - Kyree King
- Ghana:
  - Benjamin Azamati
  - Sean Safo-Antwi
  - Joseph Oduro Manu
  - Joseph Amoah
  - Emmanuel Yeboah

=== Heat 2 ===
- Denmark:
  - Frederik Schou-Nielsen
  - Tazana Kamanga-Dyrbak
  - Kojo Musah
  - Simon Hansen
  - Tobias Larsen
  - Emil Kjær
- South Africa:
  - Akani Simbine
  - Clarence Munyai
  - Shaun Maswanganyi
  - Gift Leotlela
  - Emile Erasmus
  - Henricho Bruintjies
- Brazil:
  - Erik Cardoso
  - Lucas Rodrigues da Silva
  - Rodrigo do Nascimento
  - Derick Silva
  - Gabriel dos Santos Garcia
  - Felipe Bardi dos Santos
- Italy:
  - Chituru Ali
  - Marcell Jacobs (r)
  - Matteo Melluzzo
  - Fausto Desalu
  - Lorenzo Patta
  - Diego Pettorossi
  - Hillary Wanderson Polanco Rijo
- France:
  - Jimmy Vicaut
  - ~~Mouhamadou Fall~~ (DQ)
  - Pablo Matéo
  - Aymeric Priam
  - Méba-Mickaël Zeze
  - Ryan Zeze
- Spain:
  - Alberto Calero
  - Bernat Canet
  - Jésus Gómez
  - Sergio López
  - Pablo Montalvo
  - Pol Retamal
- Canada:
  - Aaron Brown
  - Malachi Murray
  - Andre De Grasse
  - Jerome Blake
  - Brendon Rodney
  - Benjamin Williams
- Jamaica:
  - Kemar Bailey-Cole
  - Ackeem Blake
  - Yohan Blake
  - Oblique Seville
  - Conroy Jones
  - Jelani Walker

== Schedule ==
The event schedule, in local time (UTC-7), was as follows:

Date	Time	Round
22 July	18:05	Heats
23 July	19:50	Final

== Results ==
=== Heats ===
The first three in each heat (Q) and the next two fastest (q) qualified for the final.

Rank	Heat	Lane	Nation	Athletes	Time	Notes
1	1	7	United States	Christian Coleman, Noah Lyles, Elijah Hall, Marvin Bracy	37.87	Q, WL
2	2	5	France	Méba-Mickaël Zeze, Pablo Matéo, Ryan Zeze, Jimmy Vicaut	38.09	Q, SB
3	2	7	Canada	Aaron Brown, Jerome Blake, Brendon Rodney, Andre De Grasse	38.10	Q, SB
4	2	2	South Africa	Henricho Bruintjies, Emile Erasmus, Clarence Munyai, Akani Simbine	38.31	Q, SB
5	2	8	Jamaica	Ackeem Blake, Kemar Bailey-Cole, Conroy Jones, Jelani Walker	38.33	q, SB
6	2	3	Brazil	Rodrigo do Nascimento, Felipe Bardi, Derick Silva, Erik Cardoso	38.41	q, SB
7	1	4	Great Britain & N.I.	Adam Gemili, Zharnel Hughes, Nethaneel Mitchell-Blake, Reece Prescod	38.49	Q
8	1	8	Ghana	Sean Safo-Antwi, Benjamin Azamati, Joseph Oduro Manu, Joseph Amoah	38.58	Q, SB
9	2	6	Spain	Bernat Canet, Pol Retamal, Jésus Gómez, Sergio López	38.70	SB
10	2	4	Italy	Lorenzo Patta, Filippo Tortu, Fausto Desalu, Chituru Ali	38.74	SB
11	1	1	Germany	Kevin Kranz, Joshua Hartmann, Owen Ansah, Lucas Ansah-Peprah	38.83	
12	1	5	China	Tang Xingqiang, Xie Zhenye, Su Bingtian, Chen Guanfeng	38.83	SB
13	1	6	Netherlands	Hensley Paulina, Taymir Burnet, Joris van Gool, Raphael Bouju	39.07	
	2	1	Denmark	Simon Hansen, Frederik Schou-Nielsen, Tobias Larsen, Kojo Musah	DNF	
	1	2	Nigeria	Raymond Ekevwo, Godson Oghenebrume, Udodi Onwuzurike, Favour Ashe	DQ	
	1	3	Japan	Ryuichiro Sakai, Ryota Suzuki, Koki Ueyama, Hiroki Yanagita	DQ	

=== Final ===
The final started on 23 July at 19:50.

Rank	Lane	Nation	Athletes	Time	Notes
1st place, gold medalist(s)	4	Canada	Aaron Brown, Jerome Blake, Brendon Rodney, Andre De Grasse	37.48	WL, NR
2nd place, silver medalist(s)	3	United States	Christian Coleman, Noah Lyles, Elijah Hall, Marvin Bracy	37.55	SB
3rd place, bronze medalist(s)	6	Great Britain & N.I.	Jona Efoloko, Zharnel Hughes, Nethaneel Mitchell-Blake, Reece Prescod	37.83	SB
4	2	Jamaica	Ackeem Blake, Yohan Blake, Oblique Seville, Jelani Walker	38.06	SB
5	8	Ghana	Sean Safo-Antwi, Benjamin Azamati, Joseph Oduro Manu, Joseph Amoah	38.07	NR
6	7	South Africa	Emile Erasmus, Gift Leotlela, Clarence Munyai, Akani Simbine	38.10	SB
7	1	Brazil	Rodrigo do Nascimento, Felipe Bardi, Derick Silva, Erik Cardoso	38.25	SB
	5	France	Méba-Mickaël Zeze, Pablo Matéo, Ryan Zeze, Jimmy Vicaut	DQ	
