= Athletics at the 2024 Summer Olympics – Men's 4 × 100 metres relay =

Men's 4 × 100 metres relay at the Games of the XXXIII Olympiad
- Venue: Stade de France, Paris, France
- Dates: 8 August 2024 (round 1); 9 August 2024 (final)
- Winning time: 37.50

Medalists
1st place, gold medalist(s)		Aaron Brown; Jerome Blake; Brendon Rodney; Andre De Grasse	Canada
2nd place, silver medalist(s)		Bayanda Walaza; Shaun Maswanganyi; Bradley Nkoana; Akani Simbine	South Africa
3rd place, bronze medalist(s)		Jeremiah Azu; Louie Hinchliffe; Nethaneel Mitchell-Blake; Zharnel Hughes; Richard Kilty* *Indicates the athlete only competed in the preliminary heats.	Great Britain

Official Video

The men's 4 × 100 metres relay at the 2024 Summer Olympics was held in two rounds at the Stade de France in Paris, France, on 8 and 9 August 2024. This was the 26th time that the men's 4 × 100 metres relay was contested at the Summer Olympics. A total of 16 teams were able to qualify for the event through the 2024 World Athletics Relays or the World Athletics top list.

== Summary ==
After the close finish in the 100 metres between reigning World Champion Noah Lyles and seasonal World Leader Kishane Thompson, which Lyles won by .005, there was excitement for the rematch on the anchor leg of the 4 × 100 relay. USA had been the most successful Olympic 4 × 100 team of the 20th century, winning the event all but 5 of 20 Olympics between 1912 and 2000. However, they have no won since then. Jamaica had more recent success, winning 3 times in a row during the Usain Bolt era, 2008-2016. Italy returned as the defending Olympic champion with one addition to their relay team, Canada as the silver medallists returning the same lineup, and China as the bronze after the disqualification of Tokyo 2020 second place finisher Great Britain for doping. Jamaica and USA didn't make the reconfigured podium at those games, Jamaica crossing the finish line in fifth and USA finishing in sixth, in their heat, not making the final. That was a repeat of USA's recent history, finding new ways not to win the 4x100. USA's 2016 "early" exchange was especially egregious, beginning a series of disqualifications for faulty baton exchange. Predictions expected USA to break their streak of futility with Jamaica and Italy as top contenders.

Things changed when USA leader Lyles finished third in the 200 metres, without his fast finish. He announced he had been diagnosed with COVID-19 two days earlier and that he was dropping out of the relay. With substitutes, USA was the top qualifying team out of the heats. Jamaica shockingly failed to make the final.

For the final, USA substituted Kenny Bednarek onto the team for the final and completely changed the order. Great Britain, Italy and Japan made similar changes, while Canada, South Africa, China and France stuck with a well-practiced order.

With the best starter in the world, multiple World Indoor Champion Christian Coleman (USA) blasted out of the blocks, making up a huge amount of the stagger on Méba-Mickaël Zeze (FRA) to his outside, while leaving Jeremiah Azu (GBR) behind. On the far outside, Aaron Brown (CAN) was also pulling away from Deng Zhijian (CHN) while 18 year old Bayanda Walaza (RSA) was gaining behind Deng. At the first exchange, USA's Bednarek almost came to a complete stop trying to complete the handoff, Great Britain's Louie Hinchliffe whizzed by with Japan's star Abdul Hakim Sani Brown gaining. Jerome Blake (CAN) continued to widen the gap on China's star Xie Zhenye with South Africa's Shaun Maswanganyi gaining behind. Around the final turn, former World Junior Record holder Yoshihide Kiryū (JPN) zoomed past everybody, so as the teams evened out after the excellent underhand exchange to Koki Ueyama, Japan was ahead. A fast turn on the inside by Lorenzo Patta brought Italy about even with Canada's Brendon Rodney. After the handoffs, Akani Simbine (RSA) and Pablo Matéo (FRA) were even, marginally ahead of Zharnel Hughes (GBR) 3 metres down on Ueyama, Filippo Tortu (ITA) and six-time Olympic medalist Andre De Grasse (CAN). De Grasse and Tortu quickly picked off Ueyama but down the stretch Simbine and Hughes were closing fast, passing Ueyama metres out and Tortu less than 20. Simbine maintained the slight edge on Hughes to give South Africa the silver over Great Britain's bronze, but not enough to catch De Grasse for gold. The American squad crossed the line in seventh only to learn that they had been disqualified. Bednarek had left way too early, then tried to stop and the exchange from Coleman was out of the passing zone. For the Great Britain team, the bronze medal represented a redemption of sorts, as the three members of the team who had lost their silver medals when their teammate CJ Ujah tested positive for illicit drugs, after the 2020 final - Zharnel Hughes, Nethaneel Mitchell-Blake and Richard Kilty - all returned three years later to reclaim an Olympic medal.

It was a seventh Olympic medal for De Grasse and a new African Record for the South African squad. Canada's gold was their third Olympic medal in a row, after bronze in 2016 and silver in 2020.

== Background ==
The 4 × 100 metres relay at the Summer Olympics is the shortest track relay event held at the multi-sport event. The men's relay has been present on the Olympic athletics programme since 1912.

Global records before the 2024 Summer Olympics
Record	Athlete (Nation)	Time (s)	Location	Date
World record	Jamaica (Nesta Carter, Michael Frater, Yohan Blake, Usain Bolt)	36.84	London, United Kingdom	11 August 2012
Olympic record	Jamaica (Nesta Carter, Michael Frater, Yohan Blake, Usain Bolt)	36.84	London, United Kingdom	11 August 2012
World leading	United States (Courtney Lindsey, Kenneth Bednarek, Kyree King, Noah Lyles)	37.40	Nassau, Bahamas	5 May 2024

Area records before the 2024 Summer Olympics
Area Record	Athlete (Nation)	Time (s)
Africa (records)	South Africa (Thando Dlodlo, Simon Magakwe, Clarence Munyai, Akani Simbine)	37.65
Asia (records)	Japan (Shuhei Tada, Kirara Shiraishi, Yoshihide Kiryu, Abdul Hakim Sani Brown)	37.43
Europe (records)	Great Britain (Adam Gemili, Zharnel Hughes, Richard Kilty, Nethaneel Mitchell-Blake)	37.36
North, Central America and Caribbean (records)	Jamaica (Nesta Carter, Michael Frater, Yohan Blake, Usain Bolt)	36.84 WR
Oceania (records)	Australia (Paul Henderson, Tim Jackson, Steve Brimacombe, Damien Marsh)	38.17
South America (records)	Brazil (Rodrigo do Nascimento, Vitor Hugo dos Santos, Derick Silva, Paulo André de Oliveira)	37.72

== Qualification ==
For the men's 4 × 100 metres relay event, fourteen teams qualified through the 2024 World Athletics Relays. The remaining two spots were awarded to the teams with the highest ranking on the World Athletics Top List. The qualification period was between 1 July 2023 and 30 June 2024.

Qualification event	No. of teams	Qualified teams
2024 World Athletics Relays	14	Australia; Canada; China; France; Germany; Ghana; Great Britain; Italy; Jamaica; Japan; Liberia; Nigeria; South Africa; United States
World Athletics Top List (as of June 30, 2024)	2	Brazil; Netherlands
Total	16	

== Results ==
=== Round 1 ===
Round 1 was held on 8 August, starting at 11:35 (UTC+2) in the morning.

==== Heat 1 ====
Rank	Lane	Nation	Competitors	Reaction	Time	Notes
1	6	United States	Christian Coleman, Fred Kerley, Kyree King, Courtney Lindsey	0.122	37.47	Q
2	4	South Africa	Bayanda Walaza, Shaun Maswanganyi, Bradley Nkoana, Akani Simbine	0.155	37.94	Q, SB
3	5	Great Britain	Jeremiah Azu, Louie Hinchliffe, Richard Kilty, Nethaneel Mitchell-Blake	0.133	38.04	Q, SB
4	7	Japan	Abdul Hakim Sani Brown, Hiroki Yanagita, Yoshihide Kiryu, Koki Ueyama	0.141	38.06	q, SB
5	8	Italy	Matteo Melluzzo, Marcell Jacobs, Fausto Desalu, Filippo Tortu	0.144	38.07	q
6	9	Australia	Lachlan Kennedy, Jacob Despard, Calab Law, Joshua Azzopardi	0.156	38.12	AR
7	2	Nigeria	Favour Ashe, Kayinsola Ajayi, Alaba Akintola, Usheoritse Itsekiri	0.169	38.20	
8	3	Netherlands	Onyema Adigida, Taymir Burnet, Nsikak Ekpo, Elvis Afrifa	0.157	38.48	

==== Heat 2 ====
Rank	Lane	Nation	Competitors	Reaction	Time	Notes
1	5	China	Deng Zhijian, Xie Zhenye, Yan Haibin, Chen Jiapeng	0.139	38.24	Q
2	7	France	Méba-Mickaël Zeze, Jeff Erius, Ryan Zeze, Pablo Matéo	0.157	38.34	Q
3	6	Canada	Aaron Brown, Jerome Blake, Brendon Rodney, Andre De Grasse	0.174	38.39	Q
4	8	Jamaica	Ackeem Blake, Jelani Walker, Jehlani Gordon, Kishane Thompson	0.155	38.45	SB
5	9	Germany	Kevin Kranz, Owen Ansah, Yannick Wolf, Lucas Ansah-Peprah	0.151	38.53	
6	3	Brazil	Gabriel Garcia, Felipe Bardi, Erik Cardoso, Renan Correa	0.159	38.73	
7	2	Liberia	Jabez Reeves, Emmanuel Matadi, John Sherman, Joseph Fahnbulleh	0.151	38.97	
	4	Ghana	Abdul-Rasheed Saminu, Benjamin Azamati, Ibrahim Fuseini, Joseph Paul Amoah	0.214	DQ	TR 24.7

=== Final ===
The final was held on 9 August, starting at 19:45 (UTC+2) in the evening.

Rank	Lane	Nation	Competitors	Reaction	Time	Notes
1st place, gold medalist(s)	9	Canada	Aaron Brown, Jerome Blake, Brendon Rodney, Andre De Grasse	0.155	37.50	SB
2nd place, silver medalist(s)	7	South Africa	Bayanda Walaza, Shaun Maswanganyi, Bradley Nkoana, Akani Simbine	0.153	37.57	AR
3rd place, bronze medalist(s)	4	Great Britain	Jeremiah Azu, Louie Hinchliffe, Nethaneel Mitchell-Blake, Zharnel Hughes	0.162	37.61	SB
4	2	Italy	Matteo Melluzzo, Marcell Jacobs, Lorenzo Patta, Filippo Tortu	0.142	37.68	SB
5	3	Japan	Ryuichiro Sakai, Abdul Hakim Sani Brown, Yoshihide Kiryū, Koki Ueyama	0.130	37.78	SB
6	6	France	Méba-Mickaël Zeze, Jeff Erius, Ryan Zeze, Pablo Matéo	0.153	37.81	SB
7	8	China	Deng Zhijian, Xie Zhenye, Yan Haibin, Chen Jiapeng	0.160	38.06	SB
-	5	United States	Christian Coleman, Kenny Bednarek, Kyree King, Fred Kerley	0.138	DQ	TR 24.7
