= Aaron Brown (sprinter) =

Canadian sprinter (born 1992)

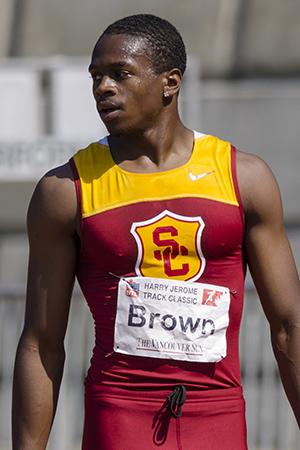
- Brown in 2013

Personal information
- Born: 27 May 1992 (age 34) Toronto, Ontario, Canada
- Height: 1.85 m (6 ft 1 in)
- Weight: 79 kg (174 lb)

Sport
- Sport: Running
- Events: 100 metres, 200 metres
- College team: USC Trojans

Achievements and titles
- Personal bests: 100 m: 9.96 (Montverde 2016); 200 m: 19.95 (Lausanne 2019)
Medal record
Men's athletics
Representing Canada
Olympic Games
| Gold medal – first place | 2024 Paris | 4 × 100 m relay |
| Silver medal – second place | 2020 Tokyo | 4 × 100 m relay |
| Bronze medal – third place | 2016 Rio de Janeiro | 4 × 100 m relay |
World Championships
| Gold medal – first place | 2022 Eugene | 4 × 100 m relay |
| Silver medal – second place | 2025 Tokyo | 4 × 100 m relay |
| Bronze medal – third place | 2013 Moscow | 4 × 100 m relay |
| Bronze medal – third place | 2015 Beijing | 4 × 100 m relay |
World Relay Championships
| Gold medal – first place | 2017 Nassau | 4 × 200 m relay |
| Silver medal – second place | 2024 Nassau | 4 × 100 m relay |
| Bronze medal – third place | 2025 Guangzhou | 4 × 100 m relay |
Commonwealth Games
| Silver medal – second place | 2018 Gold Coast | 200 m |
| Silver medal – second place | 2026 Glasgow | 4 × 100 m relay |
NACAC Championships
| Gold medal – first place | 2025 Freeport | 200 m |
| Gold medal – first place | 2025 Freeport | 4 × 100 m relay |
| Gold medal – first place | 2018 Toronto | 4 × 100 m relay |
| Silver medal – second place | 2018 Toronto | 200 m |
World Junior Championships
| Bronze medal – third place | 2010 Moncton | 200 m |
Pan American Junior Championships
| Silver medal – second place | 2011 Miramar | 4 × 100 m relay |
| Bronze medal – third place | 2011 Miramar | 100 m |
World Youth Championships
| Silver medal – second place | 2009 Brixen | 100 m |

Aaron Brown (born 27 May 1992) is a Canadian sprinter who specializes in the 100 and 200 metres. As part of Canada's 4 × 100 m relay team, he is the 2024 Olympic gold medallist, 2020 Olympic silver medallist, 2016 Olympic bronze medallist and the 2022 World champion. Brown has also won two World bronze medals as part of Canada's 4 × 100 m relay teams in 2013 and 2015.

As an individual, Brown is the 2018 Commonwealth Games silver medallist in the 200 m and won several junior championship medals early in his career.

== Career ==
=== Junior success and London Olympics ===
Brown attended Birchmount Park Collegiate Institute until 2010, and committed to the University of Southern California (USC) on a track scholarship. In 2009 Brown won the silver medal in the 100 m at the World Youth Championships in Brixen, Italy with a time of 10.74 into a headwind of 1.2 m/s. Prezel Hardy of the US took the gold and Giovanni Galbieri of Italy the bronze.

The 2010 track season saw Brown suffer through several injuries, including in a dramatic 200 m final at the 2010 Ontario Federation of School Athletic Associations (OFSAA) meet. One month later, at the World Junior Championships, Brown, after a disappointing fifth-place finish in the 100 m, fought hard, clawing his way to a bronze-medal finish in front of the home crowd in the men's 200 m in a personal-best time of 21 seconds flat. Shōta Iizuka of Japan took the gold in 20.67 seconds, with Aliaksandr Linnik of Belarus grabbing the silver in 20.89. Brown finished just 0.02 ahead of fourth-place Wayde van Niekerk of South Africa, who was clocked in 21.02.

In 2011, Brown placed third in the men's 100 m dash at the Canadian Track and Field Championships held 24 June in Calgary, Alberta. Brown had a time of 10.39 in the finals to finish in third place behind winner Sam Effah 10.23 and Jared Connaughton 10.31. Brown had an outstanding freshman season, reaching the NCAA semifinals in the 100 m dash and posting a best legal time of 10.38. Brown finished a successful season winning silver with the men's 4 × 100 metres relay team and won individual bronze in the 100 m at the 2011 Pan American Junior Athletics Championships hosted in Miramar, Florida, United States at the Ansin Sports Complex.

Brown qualified to Canada's team for the 2012 Summer Olympics, where he placed third in his heat in the men's 200 m with a time of 20.55. He placed fourth in the semifinals with a time of 20.42.

=== World medals and Rio Olympics ===
Brown attended 2013 World Championships in Athletics. Competing in the 100 m, he qualified second in his heat with a time of 10.15. He ran the same time in the semifinals but only had the thirteenth-fastest time, meaning he missed the final. He also ran with the Canadian 4 × 100 m relay team, winning a bronze medal while running at 37.92 with Gavin Smellie, Dontae Richards-Kwok, and Justyn Warner.

At the 2015 World Championships in Athletics, Brown ran a 10.03 wind assisted at +2.1 m/s in the heats of the 100 m, though in the semifinals he ran 10.15, missing the final again. Team Canada repeated their bronze medal win in the relay, running a 38.13 with Andre De Grasse, Brendon Rodney, and Justyn Warner.

Brown continued to set faster and faster times as his career progressed. In 2016 Brown ran a 9.96 in the 100 m joining Andre De Grasse in the sub-10 second club. Brown beat Tyson Gay in the preliminaries at the Star Athletics meet in Florida while running the 9.97. In the final, he finished second to Marvin Bracy, who ran a 9.94 in front of Brown's 10.01.

He participated as part of Canada's Olympic team in Rio de Janeiro. In his initial sprint distance of the 100 metres he ran 10.24 in the heats and did not advance into the semifinals. While he did advance to the semis in the 200 metres with a 20.23, his 20.37 there did not get him into the final race.

Brown was part of the 4 × 100 m relay team, which finished third in their heats. In the final, the team initially appeared to have come agonizingly close to a medal, having placed 0.02 seconds behind the third-place United States team and setting the national record. However, the American team was disqualified for an improper baton pass, handing the bronze to Canada and Brown. He ran together with anchor De Grasse, Brendon Rodney, Akeem Haynes, and Bolade Ajomale, who only ran in the heats.

=== Commonwealth silver and Tokyo Olympics ===
In the year following the success in Rio de Janeiro, Brown struggled, despite a promising gold medal win for Canada's 4 × 200 m relay team at the 2017 World Relay Championships. After a false start at the 100 m final of the 2017 Canadian Championships, he was disqualified and thus only sent to race the 200 m at the 2017 World Championships in Athletics. Upon arrival in London for the championship, he was one of many athletes to contract norovirus. He recorded the fastest time in his heat but was disqualified as a result of a lane violation. He also competed in the 4x100 metres relay. Missing their anchor Andre De Grasse, the Canadian relay team ultimately placed sixth in the finals.

Following these disappointments, Brown dedicated his 2018 season to focusing on the 2018 Commonwealth Games, to be held in Gold Coast. Named to Canada's team for the Games, specifically to compete in the 200 m, Brown initially placed third in the event final with a time of 20.34. However, second-place finisher Zharnel Hughes was then disqualified for jostling eventual gold medalist Jereem Richards, resulting in Brown winning the silver medal. This was the first major individual medal of Brown's senior career, which he credited with removing "that chip on my shoulder this year." He went on to enjoy success on the 2018 Diamond League, running the 200 m in a sub-20 second time (19.98) for the first time at the Bislett Games in Oslo. He won the Golden Spike Ostrava over reigning World champion Ramil Guliyev.

Despite being defending gold medalists in the 4x200 at the 2019 World Relay Championships, the Brown and the Canadian relay team failed to advance out of the heats in the 4 × 100 m relay, attributed in part to an awkward baton exchange from Gavin Smellie to Brown. Competing on the 2019 Diamond League, he won back-to-back gold medals in the 200 m at the Diamond League Shanghai and the BAUHAUS-galan in Stockholm. He ran a new personal best time of 19.95 in the 200 m at the Athletissima in Switzerland, and went on to win both the 100 and 200 m events at the Canadian Championships. Competing at the 2019 World Athletics Championships in Doha, Brown qualified for the finals of both the 100 and 200 m, finishing eighth and sixth. In a disappointing finish, the Canadian relay team did not advance to the 4 × 100 m final despite having the eighth-fastest overall time due to their running in the faster of the two heats.

The COVID-19 pandemic resulted in the cancellation of much of the international athletic season in 2020 and the 2020 Summer Olympics in Tokyo being delayed by a full year. Brown opted not to contest the 100 m in Tokyo, instead aiming to maximize his chances in the 200 m. He placed first in his heat, and then won his semi-final with a season's best time of 19.99, advancing to his first individual Olympic final. He placed sixth in the final with a time of 20.20. Brown raced with a photo of his family under his bib, remarking afterward, "I run for Canada. I run for my fans. But most importantly, I run for my wife and son." Brown, Jerome Blake, Brendon Rodney and Andre De Grasse then went on to the 4 × 100 m relay, where they won a second consecutive bronze medal. On 18 February 2022, Great Britain was stripped of its silver medal in the men's 4 × 100 m relay after the Court of Arbitration for Sport confirmed CJ Ujah's doping violation. Canada was upgraded to silver.

=== World Championship, Olympic gold, media appearances ===
Competing on the 2022 Diamond League, Brown won his first ever 100 m title at the British Grand Prix. At the 2022 World Athletics Championships in Eugene, Oregon, he advanced to the final of the 100 m, finishing eighth. He said that it was "encouraging" to have made the final, given his emphasis on the 200 m. In the 200 m, Brown experienced a mishap in his heat when his starting block became unhinged from the track, causing him to fall, but the heat was restarted and he qualified to the semi-final. In turn, he qualified to the World 200 m final for the second time. Brown finished in seventh place. In advance of the 4 × 100 m relay, the prospects of the Canadian team were called into question with anchor runner De Grasse's struggles with COVID-19 infection shortly before the championships. However, the Canadian team qualified for the finals with the third-fastest time in the heats, only 0.01 seconds out of second. In the final, the Canadians staged a major upset victory over the heavily favoured American team to take the gold medal, aided by smooth baton exchanges while the Americans made multiple fumbles, breaking the national record Brown had previously helped set at the Rio Olympics. This was Canada's third gold in the event, and the others being consecutive Donovan Bailey-era wins in 1995 and 1997. The result "stunned" the heavily American crowd at Hayward Field, though De Grasse noted, "there's a lot of Canadian flags out there, a lot of fans cheering us on." Reflecting on the historic win with his teammates, Brown said "I trusted these guys. We had the right spacing. I love these guys, and I'm so proud. I worked so hard this championship, and to end it off like this is icing on the cake."

Brown was initially named to the Canadian team for the 2022 Commonwealth Games but withdrew after the World Championships, with Athletics Canada citing a need "to properly recover and prepare for the rest of the season." He capped the season with an appearance at the Diamond League Final in Zürich, where he won the bronze medal in the 100 m and silver in the 200 m.

At the 2023 World Athletics Championships, Brown centered his individual hopes in making the 200 m final. He initially qualified to the final after placing third in his semi-final heat, but was disqualified for a lane infringement. With anchor De Grasse struggling with injury and declining to run in the heats of the 4 × 100 metres relay in favour of focusing on his individual 200 m final, the Canadian team was eliminated and was unable to attempt a defence of its World title. Brown said that he was "shocked, it hasn't really sunken in yet, but we win as a team and lose as a team."

In the leadup to the 2024 Summer Olympics, to be held in Paris, Brown joined the Canadian team at the 2024 World Athletics Relays, where they won the silver medal in the 4 × 100 metres relay, in the process securing Olympic qualification in that event as well. At the Canadian championships, he won the 200 m event, his twelfth national title, and was named to his fourth Olympic team. Brown did not find success in the individual sprints in Paris, first being disqualified in the heats of the 100 m for a false start, which he described as "a little embarrassing." He then reached the semi-final of the 200 m, but did not advance further. With no Canadian sprinter having reached a 100 or 200 m final at the Olympics, expectations for the Canadian 4 × 100 metres relay team were lowered, with De Grasse also suffering from a hamstring issue. The team finished third in their heat, and with the slowest time of the eight teams that reached the event final. In the final, the Canadians ran a season's best time of 37.50 and captured the gold medal, in what was widely considered a major upset victory, with a botched baton exchange ending the hopes of the heavily favoured American team. The result was heralded as one of the bigger surprises of the Paris Olympics. Of their victory, Brown said "hang it in the Louvre."

At the 2025 World Athletics Relays in Guangzhou, Brown joined the Canadian team in the 4 × 100 metres relay. In the event final, the Canadians won the bronze medal, despite a difficult baton exchange between Brown and teammate Jerome Blake. In 2025, he started hosting CBC Sports Trackside, a program on track and field with Perdita Felicien.

== Personal best ==
| Distance | Time | Venue | Notes |
|---|---|---|---|
| 100 m | 9.96 | Montverde, U.S.A. (11 June 2016) | |
| 200 m | 19.95 | Pontaise, Lausanne, Switzerland (5 July 2019) | |
| 4 × 100 m relay | 37.48 | Hayward Field, Eugene, U.S.A. (23 July 2022) | NR |

== Honours ==
In 2012 Brown was awarded the Queen Elizabeth II Diamond Jubilee Medal.

== Personal life ==
His father, Ian, is from Jamaica, and his mother, Sonia, is from England. He is his parents' only son and the second of their three children.

Brown married his college sweetheart Preeya Brown in February 2020, and their son Kingsley was born in January 2021.

== See also ==
- Canadian records in track and field
