= Brendon Rodney =

Canadian sprinter (born 1992)

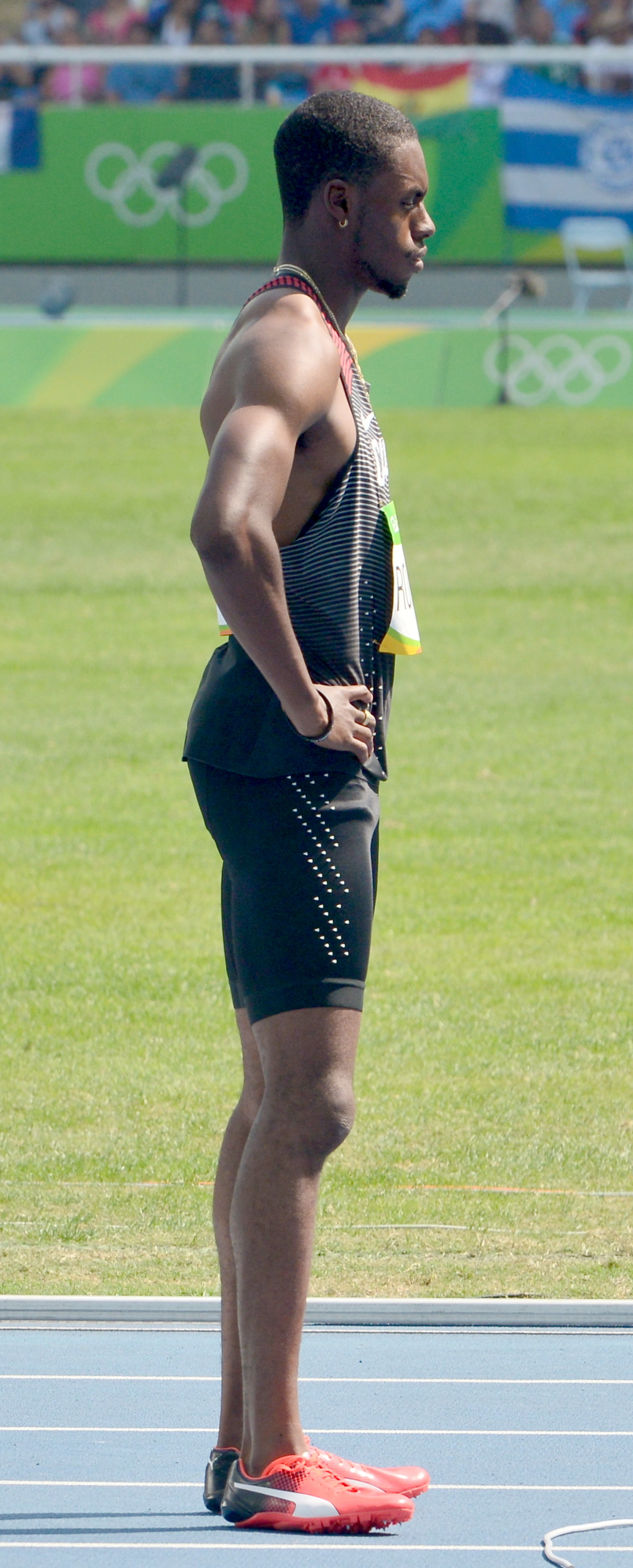
- Rodney at the 2016 Summer Olympics

Personal information
- Born: 9 April 1992 (age 34) Etobicoke, Ontario, Canada
- Education: Long Island University
- Height: 195 cm (6 ft 5 in)
- Weight: 80 kg (176 lb)

Sport
- Country: Canada
- Sport: Track and field
- Events: sprints, 200 metres, 100 metres
- College team: LIU Brooklyn Blackbirds
- Club: Kingston, Jamaica
- Turned pro: 2016
- Coached by: Simon Hodnett (club); Glenroy Gilbert (national)

Achievements and titles
- Personal bests: 100 m: 10.00 (2023); 200 m: 19.96 (2016)
Medal record
Men's athletics
Representing Canada
Olympic Games
Gold medal – first place	2024 Paris	4 × 100 m relay
Silver medal – second place	2020 Tokyo	4 × 100 m relay
Bronze medal – third place	2016 Rio de Janeiro	4 × 100 m relay
World Championships
Gold medal – first place	2022 Eugene	4 × 100 m relay
Silver medal – second place	2025 Tokyo	4 × 100 m relay
Bronze medal – third place	2015 Beijing	4 × 100 m relay
World Relay Championships
Gold medal – first place	2017 Nassau	4 × 200 m relay
Silver medal – second place	2024 Nassau	4 × 100 m relay
Bronze medal – third place	2025 Guangzhou	4 × 100 m relay
Commonwealth Games
Silver medal – second place	2026 Glasgow	4 × 100 m relay
NACAC Championships
Gold medal – first place	2025 Freeport	4 × 100 m relay

Brendon Rodney (born 9 April 1992) is a Canadian sprinter. As a member of the Canadian men's relay team, he is a three-time Olympic medallist in the 4 × 100 metres relay, taking gold in 2024, silver in 2020 and bronze in 2016. He is also the 2022 World champion and 2015 World bronze medallist in the same event.

== Career ==
Rodney attended St. Augustine Secondary School in Brampton. Rodney was named to Canada's team for the 2013 Summer Universiade. The following year he competed for Canada's team at the 2014 Commonwealth Games. He then competed as part of the Canadian team at the 2015 Pan American Games in Toronto.

On his way to competing for Canada at the 2016 Summer Olympics, Rodney became just the second Canadian man to run the 200 m in under 20 seconds when he ran a 19.96 at the national trials in Edmonton, beating favourite Andre De Grasse. The win came just weeks after his mother almost died of a brain aneurysm. In July 2016, he was named to Canada's Olympic team. In addition to winning a bronze medal with the Canadian relay team, he competed in the men's 200 m event, placing third in the seventh of the preliminary heats.

In August 2017, Rodney competed in the 2017 World Championships in Athletics, representing Canada in the 4 × 100 m relay. The Canadian relay team ultimately placed sixth place in the finals.

Despite being defending gold medalists in the 4 × 200 m at the 2019 World Relay Championships, Rodney and the Canadian relay team failed to advance out of the heats in the 4 × 100 m relay. Competing at the 2019 World Athletics Championships in Doha, Rodney placed thirteenth in the heats of the 200 m, and did not advance. In a disappointing finish, the Canadian relay team did not advance to the 4 × 100 m final despite having the eighth-fastest overall time due to their running in the faster of the two heats.

While the COVID-19 pandemic delayed the 2020 Summer Olympics by a year, Rodney was eventually named to his second Olympic team. He placed sixth in his heat of the 200 m with a time of 20.60 and did not advance. Subsequently, the relay team of Rodney, Aaron Brown, Jerome Blake, and Andre De Grasse won their second consecutive bronze medal in the 4 × 100 m relay. On 18 February 2022, Great Britain was stripped of its silver medal in the men's 4 × 100 m relay after the Court of Arbitration for Sport confirmed CJ Ujah's doping violation. Canada was upgraded to silver.

At the 2022 World Athletics Championships in Eugene, Oregon, the prospects of the Canadian 4 × 100 m relay team were called into question due to anchor runner De Grasse's struggles with COVID-19 infection shortly before the championships. However, the Canadian team qualified for the finals with the third-fastest time in the heats, only 0.01 seconds out of second. In the final, the Canadians staged a major upset victory over the heavily favoured American team to take the gold medal, aided by smooth baton exchanges while the Americans made multiple fumbles, breaking the national record in the process. This was Canada's third gold in the event, and the others being consecutive Donovan Bailey-era wins in 1995 and 1997. The result "stunned" the heavily American crowd at Hayward Field, though De Grasse noted, "there's a lot of Canadian flags out there, a lot of fans cheering us on."

At the 2023 Canadian championships, Rodney set a new personal best time of 10.0 seconds in the 100 m semi-final, meeting the individual Olympic standard, and ultimately won the silver medal. He finished third in the 200 m race. At the 2023 World Athletics Championships, Rodney reached the semi-finals of the 200 m event. He was involved in a golf cart accident while being transported to the warmup track, but was able to participate. He did not advance to the final. With anchor De Grasse struggling with injury and declining to run in the heats of the 4 × 100 metres relay in favour of focusing on his individual 200 m final, the Canadian team was eliminated and was unable to attempt a defence of its World title.

In the leadup to the 2024 Summer Olympics, to be held in Paris, Rodney participated in the 60 m event at the 2024 World Athletics Indoor Championships. He also joined the Canadian team at the 2024 World Athletics Relays, where they won the silver medal in the 4 × 100 metres relay, in the process securing Olympic qualification in that event as well. In Paris, Rodney reached the semi-final of the 200 m, but did not advance further. With no Canadian sprinter having reached a 100 or 200 m final at the Olympics, expectations for the Canadian 4 × 100 metres relay team were lowered, with De Grasse also suffering from a hamstring issue. The team finished third in their heat, and with the slowest time of the eight teams that reached the event final. In the final, the Canadians ran a season's best time of 37.50 and captured the gold medal, in what was widely considered a major upset victory, with a botched baton exchange ending the hopes of the heavily favoured American team. The result was heralded as one of the bigger surprises of the Paris Olympics.

At the 2025 World Athletics Relays in Guangzhou, Rodney joined the Canadian team in the 4 × 100 metres relay. In the event final, the Canadians won the bronze medal.

== Personal life ==
Born in Canada, Rodney is of Jamaican descent.
