= Andre De Grasse =

Canadian sprinter (born 1994)

Andre De Grasse CM OOnt OLY
- De Grasse in 2026

Personal information
- Born: 10 November 1994 (age 32) Scarborough, Ontario, Canada
- Height: 176 cm (5 ft 9 in)
- Weight: 70 kg (154 lb)

Sport
- Country: Canada
- Sport: Track and field
- Event: Sprints
- College team: Coffeyville Red Ravens (2013–2014); USC Trojans (2015)
- Club: ALTIS (2015–2018)
- Team: Puma
- Coached by: Stuart McMillan (2015–2018); Rana Reider (2018–2022, 2024); John Coghlan (2023); Mike Holloway (2025–present)

Achievements and titles
- Personal bests: 60 m: 6.60i (Lincoln, 2015); 100 m: 9.89 (Tokyo, 2021); 200 m: 19.62 NR (Tokyo, 2021)
Medal record
Men's athletics
Representing Canada
Event	1st	2nd	3rd
Olympic Games	2	2	3
World Championships	1	2	3
World Relays	1	1	1
Total	4	5	7
Olympic Games
Gold medal – first place	2020 Tokyo	200 m
Gold medal – first place	2024 Paris	4 × 100 m relay
Silver medal – second place	2016 Rio de Janeiro	200 m
Silver medal – second place	2020 Tokyo	4 × 100 m relay
Bronze medal – third place	2016 Rio de Janeiro	100 m
Bronze medal – third place	2016 Rio de Janeiro	4 × 100 m relay
Bronze medal – third place	2020 Tokyo	100 m
World Championships
Gold medal – first place	2022 Eugene	4 × 100 m relay
Silver medal – second place	2019 Doha	200 m
Silver medal – second place	2025 Tokyo	4 × 100 m relay
Bronze medal – third place	2015 Beijing	100 m
Bronze medal – third place	2015 Beijing	4 × 100 m relay
Bronze medal – third place	2019 Doha	100 m
World Athletics Relays
Gold medal – first place	2017 Nassau	4 × 200 m relay
Silver medal – second place	2024 Nassau	4 × 100 m relay
Bronze medal – third place	2025 Guangzhou	4 × 100 m relay
Diamond League
First place	2023	200 m
Commonwealth Games
Silver medal – second place	2026 Glasgow	4 × 100 m relay
Pan American Games
Gold medal – first place	2015 Toronto	100 m
Gold medal – first place	2015 Toronto	200 m
Pan American Junior Championships
Silver medal – second place	2013 Medellín	100 m
Bronze medal – third place	2013 Medellín	200 m

Andre De Grasse (born 10 November 1994) is a Canadian sprinter. A seven-time Olympic medallist, De Grasse is the 2020 Olympic champion in the 200 m, and also won the silver in the 200 m in 2016. He won a second silver in the 4 × 100 relay in 2020. He also has three Olympic bronze medals, placing third in the 100 m at both the 2016 and 2020 Games, and also in the 4 × 100 m relay in 2016. De Grasse won his second Olympic gold medal as a part of the 4 × 100 m relay team at the 2024 Summer Olympics. The win tied him with swimmer Penny Oleksiak as Canada's most decorated Olympians of all time.

At the World Athletics Championships, De Grasse won a gold medal with the Canadian 4 × 100 relay team in 2022, as well as a bronze medal in the same event in 2015. He has three individual World medals, winning silver in the 200 m in 2019 in Doha, and two bronzes in the 100 m in 2015 and 2019. He was also the double Pan American champion and the NCAA champion in the 100 m and 200 m. He is the current Canadian record holder in the 200 m, running a 19.62 in Tokyo and making him the eleventh fastest man in history over 200 m.

De Grasse is the first Canadian sprinter to win three medals in a single Olympics, bettering the two medals in a single Olympics that were won by Canadian sprinters Donovan Bailey, Ben Johnson, Percy Williams, Hilda Strike, Bobbie Rosenfeld and Robert Kerr. His gold medal finish at the 2020 Olympics was the first Canadian Olympic gold in track in 25 years and the first in the 200 m in 93 years. A consistent podium finisher, he won a medal in every Olympic and World Championship final he competed in from 2015 until the 2023 World Championships.

== Early life ==
De Grasse was born in the Toronto suburb of Scarborough, Ontario. His mother, Beverley De Grasse, was a high school sprinter in Trinidad and Tobago before she moved to Canada at age 26. His father, Alexander Waithe, moved from Barbados to Canada as a teenager. De Grasse was raised in Markham, Ontario and attended St. Marguerite Bourgeoys Catholic Elementary School from kindergarten to grade two. He later transferred to Mother Teresa Catholic School in Markham, Ont. to continue until grade eight, where he won his first race in 2006. He also attended Father Michael McGivney Catholic Academy and Milliken Mills High School.

In high school, De Grasse initially played basketball, at one point playing against future NBA All Star Andrew Wiggins of Vaughan Secondary School. In his first high school track race, the York Region Championships, De Grasse ran wearing basketball shorts and borrowed spikes; he also ignored the starting blocks and did a standing start. Despite his clear inexperience, he finished second in the 100 m final with 10.91, third overall in the 200 m with 22.64, and 7th overall in the Long Jump with 5.88m. He was spotted by future coach Tony Sharpe who noticed his impressive results compensating for the lack of starting blocks and proper racing attire. Sharpe invited De Grasse to join Pickering's Speed Academy. All three events were won by his eventual Olympic teammate Bolade Ajomale of Alexander Mackenzie High School. Having finished in the top 4 in the 100 m and 200 m, De Grasse qualified for the Ontario Central Championships, where he finished 4th in the 100 m and 10th overall in the 200 m. Finally, having qualified for the Ontario Championships in the 100 m, De Grasse placed 5th in the final. He then began to train under Sharpe at The Speed Academy.

At the 2013 Canada Games, De Grasse won three gold medals in the 100, 200, and 4 × 100-metre relay.

== Collegiate career ==
He attended Coffeyville Community College in 2013 and 2014 before transferring to USC for his junior season in 2015.

Competing for USC, De Grasse's legal 100 m time of 9.97 won the Pac-12 championship in May 2015, and was the first time he ran under 10 seconds, becoming the first Canadian to do so since Bruny Surin. In the 200 m, De Grasse broke the Canadian record with 20.03, and closed on it again with 20.05 in the final. De Grasse nabbed global attention at the NCAA Championships by winning both the 100 and 200 metres ahead of favourite Trayvon Bromell of Baylor University with wind-aided times of 9.75 and 19.58, respectively. After the race, with encouragement from his friends to keep going in the pursuit of titles, he said "So I ask myself...world champion? Olympic champion? Why not me? I've come this far, and I've only scratched the surface. I want to keep it going. Track is fun to me, and as long as it stays this way, I expect to keep getting better."

== Athletics career ==
=== 2015 season ===
==== 2015 Pan American Games ====
After winning the national 100 m title with a personal best of 9.95, De Grasse's next major event was the 2015 Pan American Games held in his home province of Ontario. He won the gold medal in the 100 m with a time of 10.05. After the race, De Grasse said of the home crowd that "Aw, it was great. I think they gave me an extra boost of energy; the crowd was amazing; I hear them cheering my name and screaming my name." De Grasse doubled and won gold in the 200 m with a new national record of 19.88. De Grasse became the first Canadian in history to run both a sub-10 in the 100 metres and sub-20 in the 200. He appeared to win a third Pan Am Games gold when he ran the second leg of the 4 x 100 m relay, in which the Canadian team came first in the race with a Games record of 38.06. However, the team was later disqualified two hours after the race for a lane infringement by Gavin Smellie.

==== 2015 World Championships ====
The 2015 World Championships in Athletics took place in Beijing. At the event, De Grasse cruised through his heat in 9.99, then made headlines when he nearly beat Usain Bolt, who stumbled out of the blocks. The two clocked 9.96, with Bolt just thousandths ahead. In the final, De Grasse tied for the bronze medal with Bromell, running a new personal best of 9.92. He became the first Canadian to win a medal in track's marquee event since Bruny Surin raced to silver in 1999. After the final De Grasse said "I didn't know who had won the race, I didn't know you could actually tie with someone for a bronze medal. So I am very happy for Trayvon and proud of myself to come away with a personal best. To race against these guys and make the final, I couldn't end the season any better than that. I can't let [the lane assignment] distract me. At the end of the day, it's the 100 m final. This was the biggest race of my life, so I wasn't going to think about no lane assignment. I had a lot of confidence after the semi-finals, being that close to Bolt, and that raised my confidence for the final." De Grasse also participated in the 4 × 100 m relay, where he won a second bronze medal, running a 38.13 together with Aaron Brown, Brendon Rodney, and Justyn Warner.

De Grasse turned professional in December 2015, signing with Puma for $11.25 million.

=== 2016 season ===
De Grasse got a rocky start in the 2016 season, finishing 8th at the Prefontaine Classic. However, he shook off the race rust in June and won the 200 m in Birmingham and the 100 m in Oslo. He defended his national 100 m title in 9.99, his first sub-10 of the season, and qualified for Canada's Olympic team. He also qualified for the 200 m, albeit finishing 3rd at the championships behind Rodney and Brown.

==== 2016 Summer Olympics ====
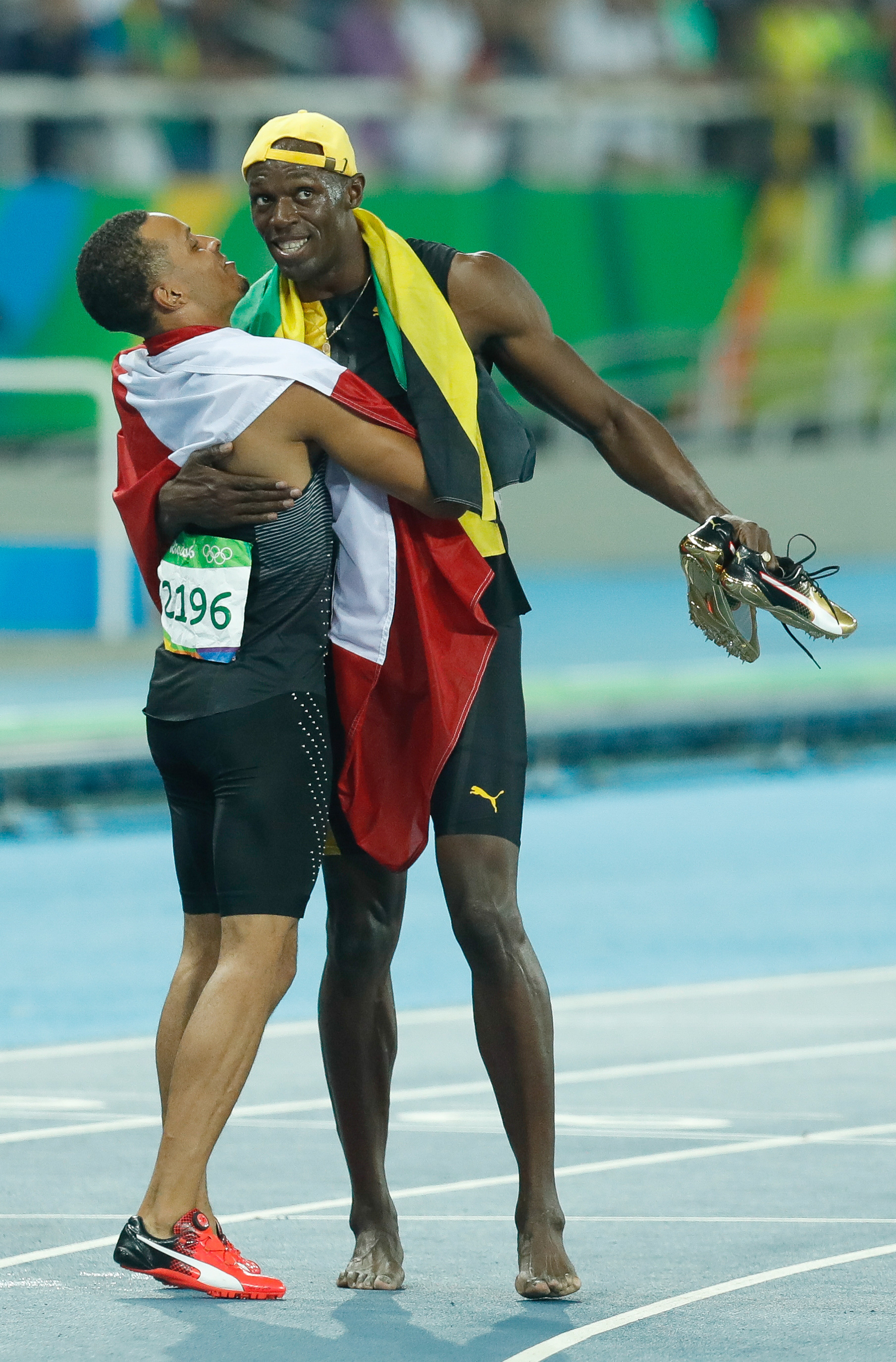
De Grasse and Bolt after running the 100 m final at the 2016 Olympics

De Grasse entered the Rio Olympics carrying Canada's hopes as a medallist. He advanced to the finals of the 100 m with ease after running a time of 10.04 in his heat and then equaling his personal best of 9.92 in the semi-finals. He impressed many by staying level with Usain Bolt during their semifinal and even appeared to mimic the world record holder, the two Puma sponsorees crossing the line together with smiles. De Grasse won the bronze medal in the final in 9.91 seconds, a new personal best, behind Bolt and his main rival Justin Gatlin. He became the first male athlete to win a medal for Canada at the 2016 Summer Olympics. De Grasse's medal sparked talk of him being Bolt's heir apparent in the athletics world, a claim that Bolt supported:

He came through again. He's going to be good; he runs just like me, I mean, he's really slow at the blocks, but when he gets going, he gets going.

— Usain Bolt, on De Grasse being the future of athletics after his retirement

After that, De Grasse said of his relationship with Bolt, "We were just having some fun. Me (sic) and Usain met back in January, we did a lot of things together. He feels like I'm the next one, and now I'm just trying to live up to it." Former Canadian Olympic Champion Donovan Bailey was seen jumping up and down in the CBC Sports studio, cheering on De Grasse. After, he said, "I'm shaking. This is great for track and field in Canada."

In the 200 m, De Grasse had the fastest time in the heats of 20.09. De Grasse and Bolt were again lined up beside each other in the semi-finals. Bolt led at halfway when De Grasse suddenly rushed to his shoulder, appearing to try to beat him. The two exchanged smiles and crossed the line together, one of the most iconic moments of the games. De Grasse claimed his strategy was to tire Bolt out before the final, which Bolt did not appear to appreciate. De Grasse's time of 19.80 was a new Canadian record, and he became the first Canadian to make it to the finals of the 200 m since Atlee Mahorn at the 1988 Olympics in Seoul. Despite his tactic, De Grasse finished behind Bolt again, this time with the silver medal in 20.02, the first Canadian to win a medal in the 200 m since Percy Williams at the 1928 Olympics in Amsterdam.

De Grasse ran the anchor for the finals of the 4 x 100 m relay. Initially in 6th place, De Grasse made an incredible close on Japan and the United States by about 4 metres, though he narrowly missed the bronze medal by 0.02 seconds. Despite this, the Canadians set a new national record of 37.64 seconds, breaking the record set in 1996 in Atlanta. However, the American team that placed third was disqualified for a zone violation (handing over the baton outside of the designated zone) at the first baton change, so the Canadians were awarded the bronze medal.

=== 2017 season ===
As in 2016, De Grasse had a rocky start to his season but quickly picked up again. He took Diamond League wins over the 100 m in Oslo and Stockholm, and 200 m wins in Rome and Rabat. His time in Stockholm of 9.69w (+4.8 m/s) was over the 2.0 m/s wind limit but the 4th fastest in history regardless. With Bolt choosing to forego the 200 m, De Grasse was considered a strong favourite for the world title in London. His main goal was to beat Bolt in the 100 m before his retirement after the championships. After winning both the 100 m and 200 m national titles, De Grasse was in contention to make the same double in London and defeat the world record holder. However, just days before the world championships, De Grasse strained his hamstring and was forced to pull out of both events, effectively ending his goal of beating Bolt before his retirement. A few weeks earlier, the two were set to face off in Monaco, but De Grasse was reportedly pulled out the race. His coach claimed it was Bolt's doing, likely involving contract clauses with Bolt's team, who were unwilling to see De Grasse potentially defeat him before the championships. A few days later, Bolt also said in an interview that "The last guy I said was going to be great disrespected me", a comment interpreted to be about De Grasse and his unexpected move in the semifinals of the 200 in Rio. Despite the apparent tensions, Bolt admitted he would have liked to race De Grasse in London.

=== 2018 season ===
On 10 January 2018, De Grasse was named to Canada's 2018 Commonwealth Games team. However, he had withdrawn before the games began due to his hamstring injury.

In the Diamond League, De Grasse finished 6th in the 200 m in Doha and 8th in the 100 m in Shanghai, clearly affected by his injuries. He was unable to defend his national title in the 100 m, settling for third in 10.20. During the 200 m heats, he pulled up with a hamstring injury; the crowd cheered De Grasse on as he walked to the finish line, and he ended his season. Following his injuries, De Grasse left ALTIS and coach Stu McMillan in Arizona, moving to Jacksonville to train under Rana Reider.

=== 2019 season ===
==== Return from injury ====
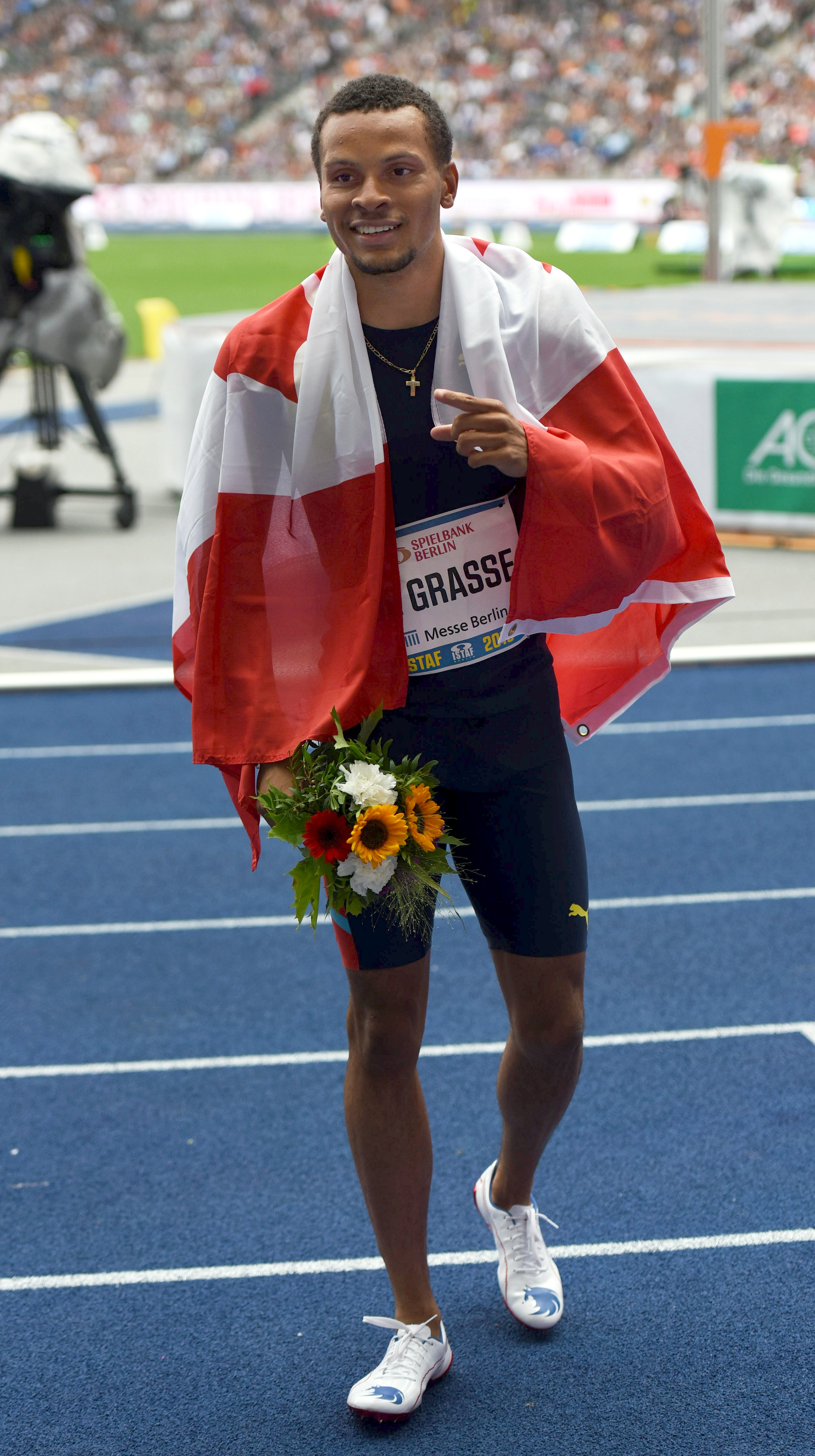
De Grasse at the 2019 ISTAF Berlin

Despite initial struggles in the early season, De Grasse appeared to be making a slow return to international competition. He finished second to Aaron Brown in the 200 m at the Diamond League in Shanghai. A month later, he won his first Diamond League victory in two years at the Rabat 200 m event, beating the reigning World champion Ramil Guliyev. Ultimately, he would finish on the podium in five of seven 100 m events and all six 200 m in the leadup to the World Championships. The following week, he beat Christian Coleman at the Ostrava Golden Spike in the 200 m with 19.91. In July, he broke 10 seconds for the first time in 3 years at the Diamond League in London.

==== 2019 World Championships ====
At the national championships, De Grasse nearly beat Brown in the 100 m, the two clocking 10.03 and being separated by thousandths. He was named to the Canadian team for the 2019 World Athletics Championships in Doha in both of his disciplines. Across the season, De Grasse remained consistent at multiple Diamond League races, clocking several sub-20 second races across the 200 m. He ended his pre-championship season with a 100 m win at the ISTAF Berlin in 9.97.

At the championships, De Grasse made his contention official by winning his semifinal in the 100 m, beating defending champion Justin Gatlin and number 2 all-time Yohan Blake. He won bronze in the final with 9.90, a new personal best once again. Competing next in the 200 m, he won the silver medal behind Noah Lyles in 19.95, shy of his season's best of 19.87. De Grasse commented that he tired slightly toward the end of the race but that "I'm not disappointed. I didn't think I'd be here a year ago." This was the first World Championship medal for a Canadian in the 200 m since Atlee Mahorn in 1991. He anchored the Canadian 4 × 100 team once again but came short of qualifying for the final despite setting a season's best of 37.91 and finishing eighth overall.

=== 2021 season ===
The onset of the COVID-19 pandemic resulted in the cancellation of much of the 2020 international season and the delay of the 2020 Summer Olympics by a year. De Grasse opened his 2021 season on 17 April at the Tom Jones Memorial Invitational in Gainesville, Florida, running the 100 m in 9.99. His subsequent 100 m starts, including two appearances on the 2021 Diamond League circuit, saw times of over ten seconds. He enjoyed more success in the 200 m, finishing in the top three in all of his three Diamond League appearances, including winning the Oslo event with a time of 20.09. He also participated in the Müller British Grand Prix as part of the Canadian 4 × 100 m relay team, which placed second with a time of 38.29.

==== 2020 Summer Olympics ====
De Grasse was named to the 2020 Canadian Olympic team and was identified as one of Canada's top medal contenders in athletics, notwithstanding some of his early results that year. Former Olympic champion Donovan Bailey dismissed concerns regarding De Grasse's times, stating that, in his view, he was "more concerned that he's injury-free and been consistent."

Upon arrival in Tokyo for the 2020 Summer Olympics, De Grasse began by competing in the heats of the men's 100 m. He easily won his heat, posting a new season-best time of 9.91, just 0.01 shy of his personal best from two years before, and ended up with the fastest time in any of the heats. He was second in his semi-final behind Fred Kerley, running 9.98, and advanced to the final. In the final, De Grasse had the unfavourable ninth lane placement and was slow off the blocks, but rapidly gained ground over the final forty metres of the race to finish in third place and claim his second bronze medal in the event, with a new personal best time of 9.89. This was Canada's fourteenth medal of the Tokyo Olympics and the first for a male athlete. The lack of medals for Canadian men had become a point of media and viewer discussion through the first nine days of the Games. He also became the first Canadian man to win multiple Olympic medals in the 100 m.

De Grasse next competed in the heats of the 200 m, qualifying automatically as the third man in his heat with 20.56. This had him again in the unfavourable ninth lane when in his semi-final, he set a new personal best and national record of 19.73, the fastest time in the semi-final phase. De Grasse then went on to win the gold medal in the 200 m final in a personal best and Canadian record time of 19.62 seconds, making him the 8th fastest of all-time over 200 metres. This was Canada's first track gold medal since 1996, and the first gold medal in the 200 m since Percy Williams' victory in 1928. De Grasse was the only male sprinter to compete in both the 100 and 200 m races in Tokyo.

Hours after his gold medal win, De Grasse competed in the heats of the 4 × 100 m relay alongside Aaron Brown, Jerome Blake and Brendon Rodney. Again taking the anchor leg, at the point, De Grasse took the baton from Rodney, the Canadian team was judged to be in approximately fifth place, but De Grasse reached the finish line in second, only two-thousandths of a second behind Chinese anchor runner Wu Zhiqiang. The Canadian team's qualifying time was third-fastest in the heats, behind Jamaica and China. De Grasse repeated this performance in the event final, taking Canada from fifth to the bronze medal position on the anchor leg, securing his sixth Olympic medal. This bronze was later upgraded to a silver when the team from Great Britain was disqualified. This tied him with Cindy Klassen and Clara Hughes as the second-most decorated Canadian Olympian (behind Penny Oleksiak).

==== 2021 Diamond League ====
In his first event subsequent to the Olympics, De Grasse returned to the Diamond League for the Prefontaine Classic in Eugene, Oregon. Running in the 100 metres event, De Grasse recorded a wind-assisted time of 9.74 seconds, winning the event ahead of Tokyo silver medalist Kerley. De Grasse said that following the Olympics, he "just went out there to have some fun." Weeks later in the Diamond League Final in Zürich, De Grasse placed second in both the 100 and 200 metres events, running in both on the same night. He equalled his 9.89 time from the Olympics and then ran 19.72 an hour later, despite later saying, "I just had no gas" for the latter. He called it the end of "my greatest season ever."

=== 2022 season ===
The 2022 season began with difficulties for De Grasse, who was hampered by an injury to his foot. After a ninth-place finish at the Prefontaine Classic in the 100 m, he won gold at the Bislett Games in Oslo with a season-best time of 10.05 seconds. Shortly afterward, he contracted COVID-19 for the second time, experiencing a significant setback to his training due to breathing difficulties.

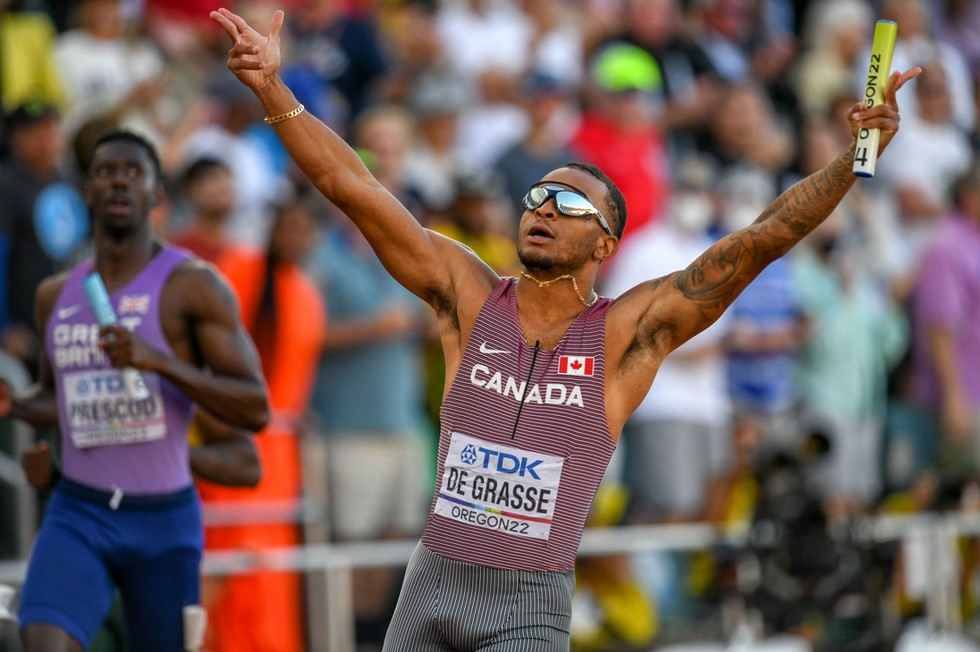
Andre De Grasse after he ran the anchor leg to win the 4 × 100 m relay at the World Championships in Oregon.

Despite his health struggles, he opted to compete at the 2022 World Athletics Championships in Eugene, Oregon. In the 100 m, De Grasse was second in his heat with a 10.12 time, qualifying to the semi-finals, despite visible difficulties. He ran a 10.21 in the semi-finals and did not advance to the final; the first time at an individual World event, he had failed to win a medal. In light of his health, De Grasse said, "it's alright. It's been a challenging season. I'll take it; I made it to the semifinals." He subsequently chose to withdraw from the 200 m. There were questions raised about his readiness in advance of the 4 × 100 m relay, but De Grasse indicated that he felt able to compete. The Canadian team qualified for the finals with the third-fastest time in the heats, De Grasse being pipped at the line by Frenchman Jimmy Vicaut by 0.01 seconds. In the final, the Canadians staged a major upset victory over the heavily favoured American team to take the gold medal, aided by smooth baton exchanges while the Americans made multiple fumbles. De Grasse ran the anchor leg for Canada, maintaining the lead over American Marvin Bracy to secure his first-ever relay major championship gold, breaking the national record he had previously helped set at the Rio Olympics. This was Canada's third gold in the event, and the others being consecutive Bailey era wins in 1995 and 1997. The result "stunned" the heavily American crowd at Hayward Field, but De Grasse noted "there's a lot of Canadian flags out there, a lot of fans cheering us on -- it definitely feels good. It's not technically on home soil, but it kind of felt like it." Reflecting on the historic win with his teammates, he said: "We have talked and dreamed about this moment together."

De Grasse was initially named to the Canadian team for the 2022 Commonwealth Games, but withdrew after the World Championships, with Athletics Canada citing a need "to properly recover and prepare for the rest of the season." Struggles with injury and the aftermath of COVID continued, and he ended the season with an appearance at the Diamond League Final in Zürich, where he came eighth of eight runners in the 100 m and sixth in the 200 m.

=== 2023 season ===
Following the conclusion of the 2022 season, with coach Reider under investigation by the U.S. Center for SafeSport for sexual misconduct, De Grasse opted to move to Orlando to train under John Coghlan. He claimed that the switch "had nothing to do really with what was happening... I just wanted to try to get a fresh start." His partner Ali joined him in training there. The return to competition following the injuries of the previous season proved to be a struggle for De Grasse, and in his first seven races he did not run under 10 seconds in the 100 m or under 20.20 seconds in the 200 m.

De Grasse's final opportunity to run qualifying times for the 2023 World Athletics Championships came at the Canadian Championships at the end of July. He had the ninth-fastest time in the semi-finals of the 100 m, running it in 10.21 seconds, and did not advance to the finals. As such, he would not qualify to the World Championships in that event. In the 200 m, he reached the final and ran a new season's best time of 20.01 seconds to win, improving on his prior best time by 0.34 seconds.

With the heats of the World Championships 4 × 100 m relay scheduled during the same session as the final of the 200 m, De Grasse opted not to participate in the heats. In his absence, the defending World champions finished sixth in their heat and failed to advance. He criticized the scheduling decisions by World Athletics and said it needed to be fixed for subsequent championships. In the final of the 200 m, De Grasse finished sixth with a time of 20.14, the first time he had failed to win a medal in a World or Olympic final. Reflecting on it, he observed that "I made the final through all of this challenging season. I shouldn't have been here, to be honest. I shouldn't have been in the final just the way my season was going."

Despite his difficulties in the season, De Grasse reached the 2023 Diamond League final for the 200 m, held in Eugene at Hayward Field. Largely discounted as a title contender by commentators, he posted a season-best time of 19.76 seconds to win the Diamond League title. This was the fourth-fastest time of his career. He was the first Canadian sprinter to win a Diamond League title, and the third Canadian to win a Diamond League title in any event.

=== 2024 season ===
Following the end of the 2023 athletics season, De Grasse announced that he was returning to former coach Rana Reider, who had been placed on a year's probation by the U.S. Center for SafeSport after admitting to a consensual relationship with an 18-year-old athlete. De Grasse explained the move as a family decision based on Jacksonville, Florida being "a much better set-up for our kids with schools and extracurricular activities." With respect to his prior departure from Reider's camp in 2022, he said that "there were some distractions in 2022 but those issues have been resolved."

In the early going of the 2024 athletic season, De Grasse struggled to produce noteworthy times. His best international result in the 100 m came at the Paavo Nurmi Games, where he placed third and reached the Olympic qualifying standard. In the 200 m, his best time was 19.98 at the Gyulai István Memorial, under 20 seconds but short of what rivals such as Noah Lyles and Kenneth Bednarek were managing. At the 2024 World Athletics Relays in May, he won the silver medal with the Canadian team in the 4 × 100 metres relay, in the process securing Olympic qualification in that event as well. De Grasse won his first national title in the 100 m since 2017, with a time of 10.20, but did not contest the 200 m event there.

==== 2024 Summer Olympics ====
Named to his third Canadian Olympic team for the 2024 Summer Olympics in Paris, De Grasse was named Canada's co-flagbearer for the opening ceremonies, alongside weightlifter Maude Charron. The individual sprint events proved disappointing for De Grasse, who narrowly advanced out of the 100 m heats with a 10.07 time that enabled him to earn the final automatic qualifying spot, but failed to qualify for the final despite running a season's best 9.98 in the semi-final. In the interval between sprints, Athletics Canada revoked the credentials of coach Reider, citing newly-reported lawsuits against him by three athletes accusing him of sexual assault, sexual harassment and verbal harassment. De Grasse claimed not to have heard of the allegations before the week in question, saying it was "kind of a tough one to swallow." He next sought to defend his gold medal in the 200 m, coming second in his heat behind Lyles with a 20.30 time. He was third as well in the semi-final, this time running 20.41, and did not reach the event final, ending his attempted title defence. De Grasse admitted afterward it had been "a tough 24, 48 hours," and revealed that he had reaggravated a hamstring issue in the 100 m semi-final.

After the difficulties in his individual events, expectations for the Canadian 4 × 100 metres relay team were lowered, none of the others having qualified for an individual final either. The team finished third in their heat, and with the slowest time of the eight teams that reached the event final. When asked about his hamstring, De Grasse said he was "trying to give it my best effort and hopefully that'll be enough." In the final, the Canadians ran a season's best time of 37.50 and captured the gold medal, in what was widely considered a major upset victory, with a botched baton exchange ending the hopes of the heavily favoured American team. The result was widely heralded as one of the bigger surprises of the Paris Olympics, with one journalist remarking it "even seemed to surprise De Grasse." He earned his seventh Olympic medal, which equaled swimmer Penny Oleksiak's Canadian record for the most cumulative medals for a Canadian Olympian. With his second gold medal, De Grasse equaled Percy Williams and Donovan Bailey among Canadian sprinters, leading The National Post to proclaim him "the greatest Canadian Olympic sprinter in history."

=== 2025 season ===
De Grasse began training in Gainesville, Florida under coach Mike Holloway. Beginning the season at the Astana Indoor Meeting on the 2025 World Athletics Indoor Tour, De Grasse came fifth. He made his outdoor debut at the Florida Relays event, held in Gainesville, where he won the 200 m and led his relay team to the gold medal. He next appeared in the inaugural edition of the Grand Slam Track, a new professional track competition series founded by former Olympic champion Michael Johnson, racing at the 2025 Miami Slam in early May. He came fourth in the 200 m race, and eighth in the 100 m, for a cumulative finish of sixth overall.

At the 2025 World Athletics Relays in Guangzhou, De Grasse ran the anchor leg for the Canadian team in the 4 × 100 metres relay. He was credited with carrying the team to second place in their heat to secure automatic qualification for the World Championships relay event later in the year. In the final, the Canadians won the bronze medal after De Grasse received the baton in 5th place and passed the Japanese and Italian sprinters in the anchor leg.

== Philanthropy and public appearances ==
In 2016, he established the Andre De Grasse Holiday Classic Basketball Tournament, a charity event that supports the Andre De Grasse Family Foundation. In September 2017, he appeared at WE Day, a WE Charity event in Toronto. De Grasse also created and participates annually in a basketball tournament named "Holiday Classic at Markham" at Pan Am Centre. All proceeds from the tournament go to the Andre De Grasse Family Foundation.

== Personal life ==
He and his wife, American hurdler Nia Ali, have a daughter, Yuri, born June 2018 and a second child in May 2021. De Grasse is Catholic, having been influenced by the faith of his parents. He has the word "hope" and a prayer tattooed on his arm.

== Honours ==
De Grasse's success at the Olympics led to him winning the 2016 Lionel Conacher Award as the Canadian Press male athlete of the year, and be presented with the Rising Star Award by the IAAF. In April 2017 De Grasse was a recipient of a Harry Jerome Award. De Grasse was made a member of the Order of Ontario for the class of 2022 and a member of the Order of Canada in 2025.

== Statistics ==
Information from World Athletics profile unless otherwise noted.

=== Personal bests ===
Event	Time	Wind (m/s)	Venue	Date	Notes
60 m	6.60	—N/a	Lincoln, Nebraska, U.S.	7 February 2015	Indoor
100 m	9.89	+0.1	Tokyo, Japan	1 August 2021	
100 m	9.69 w	+4.8	Stockholm, Sweden	18 June 2017	Wind-assisted
200 m	19.62	−0.5	Tokyo, Japan	4 August 2021	NR
200 m	19.58 w	+2.4	Eugene, Oregon, U.S.	12 June 2015	Wind-assisted
Indoor 200 m	20.26	—N/a	Fayetteville, Arkansas, U.S.	14 March 2015	Indoor NR
4 × 100 m relay	37.48	—N/a	Eugene, Oregon, U.S.	23 July 2022	NR (Note: Shared with Aaron Brown, Jerome Blake, and Brendon Rodney for Canada.)
4 × 200 m relay	1:19.20	—N/a	Gainesville, Florida, U.S.	2 April 2016	NR (Note: Shared with Gavin Smellie, Brendon Rodney, and Aaron Brown for Canada.)

=== Seasonal bests ===
100 m
Year	Time	Wind (m/s)	Venue	Date
2012	10.59	−0.3	Toronto, Ontario, Canada	11 July
2013	9.96 w	+5.0	Hutchinson, Kansas, U.S.	18 May
2013	10.25	+1.2	Windsor, Ontario, Canada	29 June
2014	10.03 w	+4.0	Lawrence, Kansas, U.S.	19 April
2014	10.15	+0.9	Mesa, Arizona, U.S.	17 May
2015	9.75 w	+2.7	Eugene, Oregon, U.S.	12 June
2015	9.92	−0.5	Beijing, China	23 August
2016	9.91	+0.2	Rio de Janeiro, Brazil	14 August
2017	10.01	+0.2	Oslo, Norway	15 June
2017	9.69 w	+4.8	Stockholm, Sweden	18 June
2018	10.15	+1.9	Des Moines, Iowa, U.S.	28 April
2019	9.97	+1.4	Berlin, Germany	1 September
2019	9.90	+0.6	Doha, Qatar	28 September
2020	9.97	+1.9	Clermont, Florida, U.S.	24 July
2021	9.89	+0.1	Tokyo, Japan	1 August
2021	9.74 w	+2.9	Eugene, Oregon, U.S.	21 August
2022	10.05	+0.5	Oslo, Norway	16 June
2023	10.16	-0.1	Memphis, Tennessee, U.S	4 August

200 m
Year	Time	Wind (m/s)	Venue	Date
2013	20.57 w	+3.4	Hutchinson, Kansas, U.S.	17 May
2013	20.72	+1.9	Windsor, Ontario, Canada	30 June
2014	20.38	+0.5	Mesa, Arizona, U.S.	17 May
2015	19.58 w	+2.4	Eugene, Oregon, U.S.	12 June
2015	19.88	+0.3	Toronto, Ontario, Canada	24 July
2016	19.80	−0.3	Rio de Janeiro, Brazil	17 August
2017	20.01	+0.6	Rome, Italy	8 June
2017	19.96 w	+2.7	Ottawa, Ontario, Canada	9 July
2018	20.46	+1.3	Doha, Qatar	4 May
2019	19.87	+0.8	Brussels, Belgium	6 September
2020	20.24	+0.8	Clermont, Florida, U.S.	25 July
2021	19.62	−0.5	Tokyo, Japan	4 August
2022	20.38	+0.6	Paris, France	18 June
2023	19.76	+0.6	Eugene, Oregon, U.S.	17 September

=== International championship results ===
Representing Canada
Year	Competition	Venue	Position	Event	Time	Wind (m/s)	Notes
2013	Pan American Junior Championships	Medellín, Colombia	2nd	100 m	10.36	+1.8	
2013	Pan American Junior Championships	Medellín, Colombia	3rd	200 m	20.74	NWI	
2014	Commonwealth Games	Glasgow, Scotland	15th	200 m	20.73	+0.2	
2014	Commonwealth Games	Glasgow, Scotland	DNF	4 × 100 m relay	—	—N/a	
2015	Pan American Games	Toronto, Ontario, Canada	1st	100 m	10.05	+1.1	
2015	Pan American Games	Toronto, Ontario, Canada	1st	200 m	19.88	+0.3	PB
2015	Pan American Games	Toronto, Ontario, Canada	DQ	4 × 100 m relay	~~38.06~~	—N/a	Lane violation
2015	World Championships	Beijing, China	3rd	100 m	9.92	−0.5	PB
2015	World Championships	Beijing, China	3rd	4 × 100 m relay	38.13	—N/a	
2016	Olympic Games	Rio de Janeiro, Brazil	3rd	100 m	9.91	+0.2	PB
2016	Olympic Games	Rio de Janeiro, Brazil	2nd	200 m	20.02	−0.5	
2016	Olympic Games	Rio de Janeiro, Brazil	3rd	4 × 100 m relay	37.64	—N/a	
2017	World Relays	Nassau, Bahamas	DNF	4 × 100 m relay	—	—N/a	
2017	World Relays	Nassau, Bahamas	1st	4 × 200 m relay	1:19.42	—N/a	WL
2019	World Relays	Yokohama, Japan	11th	4 × 100 m relay	38.76	—N/a	
2019	World Championships	Doha, Qatar	3rd	100 m	9.90	+0.6	PB
2019	World Championships	Doha, Qatar	2nd	200 m	19.95	+0.3	
2021	Olympic Games	Tokyo, Japan	3rd	100 m	9.89	+0.1	PB
2021	Olympic Games	Tokyo, Japan	1st	200 m	19.62	−0.5	NR
2021	Olympic Games	Tokyo, Japan	2nd	4 × 100 m relay	37.70		SB
2022	World Championships	Eugene, Oregon, U.S.	5th (sf)	100 m	10.21	+0.1	
2022	World Championships	Eugene, Oregon, U.S.	1st	4 × 100 m relay	37.48		NR
2023	World Championships	Budapest, Hungary	6th	200 m	20.14		
2024	Olympic Games	Paris, France	12th (sf)	100 m	9.98		
2024	Olympic Games	Paris, France	10th (sf)	200 m	20.41		
2024	Olympic Games	Paris, France	1st	4 × 100 m relay	37.50		
2025	World Championships	Tokyo, Japan	13th (sf)	100 m	10.09	0.0	
2025	World Championships	Tokyo, Japan	12th (sf)	200 m	20.13	+1.0	
2025	World Championships	Tokyo, Japan	2nd	4 × 100 m relay	37.55	—N/a	
2026	Commonwealth Games	Glasgow, United Kingdom	2nd	4 × 100 m relay	38.11	—N/a	
2026	World Ultimate Championship	Budapest, Hungary	5th	200 m	19.92	−0.1	

=== National championship results ===
Representing the Coffeyville Red Ravens (2013–2014), the USC Trojans (2015), and Puma (2016–present)
Year	Competition	Venue	Position	Event	Time	Wind (m/s)	Notes
2013	NJCAA Indoor Championships	Lubbock, Texas, U.S.	1st	55 m	6.21	—N/a	PB
2013	NJCAA Indoor Championships	Lubbock, Texas, U.S.	3rd	200 m	21.11	—N/a	PB
2013	NJCAA Division I Championships	Hutchinson, Kansas, U.S.	1st	100 m	9.96 w	+5.0	Wind-assisted
2013	NJCAA Division I Championships	Hutchinson, Kansas, U.S.	8th	200 m	21.47 w	+4.0	Wind-assisted
2013	NJCAA Division I Championships	Hutchinson, Kansas, U.S.	2nd	4 × 100 m relay	39.88	—N/a	PB
2013	Canadian Championships	Moncton, New Brunswick, Canada	4th	100 m	10.35	+0.2	
2013	Canadian Junior Championships	Sainte-Thérèse, Quebec, Canada	1st	100 m	10.53	−2.1	
2013	Canadian Junior Championships	Sainte-Thérèse, Quebec, Canada	1st	200 m	20.90	−2.1	
2014	NJCAA Indoor Championships	New York, New York, U.S.	1st	60 m	6.71	—N/a	
2014	NJCAA Indoor Championships	New York, New York, U.S.	1st	200 m	21.01	—N/a	
2014	NJCAA Division I Championships	Mesa, Arizona, U.S.	2nd	100 m	10.15	+0.9	PB
2014	NJCAA Division I Championships	Mesa, Arizona, U.S.	1st	200 m	20.38	+0.5	PB
2014	Canadian Championships	Moncton, New Brunswick, Canada	2nd	100 m	10.41	−1.8	
2014	Canadian Championships	Moncton, New Brunswick, Canada	4th	200 m	21.05 w	+2.3	Wind-assisted
2015	NCAA Division I Indoor Championships	Fayetteville, Arkansas, U.S.	DQ	60 m	—	—N/a	False start
2015	NCAA Division I Indoor Championships	Fayetteville, Arkansas, U.S.	2nd	200 m	20.26	—N/a	NR, PB
2015	NCAA Division I Championships	Eugene, Oregon, U.S.	1st	100 m	9.75 w	+2.7	Wind-assisted
2015	NCAA Division I Championships	Eugene, Oregon, U.S.	1st	200 m	19.58 w	+2.4	Wind-assisted
2015	NCAA Division I Championships	Eugene, Oregon, U.S.	4th	4 × 100 m relay	38.75	—N/a	SB
2015	Canadian Championships	Edmonton, Alberta, Canada	1st	100 m	9.95	+1.5	PB
2016	Canadian Championships	Edmonton, Alberta, Canada	1st	100 m	9.99	−0.1	SB
2016	Canadian Championships	Edmonton, Alberta, Canada	3rd	200 m	20.32	+1.1	
2017	Canadian Championships	Ottawa, Ontario, Canada	1st	100 m	10.11	+0.8	
2017	Canadian Championships	Ottawa, Ontario, Canada	1st	200 m	19.96 w	+2.7	Wind-assisted
2018	Canadian Championships	Ottawa, Ontario, Canada	3rd	100 m	10.20	+0.1	
2019	Canadian Championships	Montreal, Quebec, Canada	2nd	100 m	10.03	+0.1	
2023	Canadian Championships	Langley, British Columbia, Canada	9th (h)	100 m	10.21	−0.2	
2023	Canadian Championships	Langley, British Columbia, Canada	1st	200 m	20.01	+0.4	

- NJCAA and NCAA results from Track & Field Results Reporting System.

=== Circuit performances ===
Grand Slam Track results
Slam	Race group	Event	Pl.	Time	Prize money
2025 Miami Slam	Short sprints	100 m	8th	10.05	US$15,000
2025 Miami Slam	Short sprints	200 m	4th	20.23	US$15,000
2025 Philadelphia Slam	Short sprints	200 m	4th	20.58	US$25,000
2025 Philadelphia Slam	Short sprints	100 m	5th	10.15	US$25,000

==== Wins and titles ====
- Diamond League (Events in parentheses)
  - Rabat: 2017 (200 m), 2019 (200 m)
  - Rome: 2017 (200 m)
  - Oslo: 2016 (100 m), 2017 (100 m), 2021 (200 m), 2022 (100 m)
  - Stockholm: 2017 (100 m)
  - Eugene: 2021 (100 m), 2023 (200 m)
  - Birmingham: 2016 (200 m)

== See also ==
- List of Canadian sports personalities

== Notes ==
Olympic Games
Preceded by Marie-Philip Poulin; Charles Hamelin	Flagbearer for Canada; Paris 2024 (with Maude Charron)	Succeeded by Marielle Thompson; Mikaël Kingsbury
