= Jelani Walker =

Jamaican athlete

Personal information
- Nationality: Jamaican
- Born: 10 June 1998 (age 28)
- Height: 6’ 4”

Sport
- Sport: Athletics
- Event: Sprint

Achievements and titles
- Personal bests: 100m: 10.00s (2022); 200m: 20.65 (2022)

Jelani Walker (born 10 June 1998) is a Jamaican sprinter. He has run as part of the Jamaican 4 x 100 metres relay team at the World Athletics Championships and Olympic Games.

== Career ==
He finished fourth in the men's 100m race at the 2022 Jamaican Athletics Championships in Kingston, Jamaica in June 2022. He was subsequently named in the Jamaican relay pool for the 2022 World Athletics Championships. He competed as part of the Jamaican team which placed fourth in the final at the 4 x 100 metres relay in Eugene, Oregon. Walker was able to take part after being cleared only a few days for the race after testing positive for COVID-19. He was able to race in the qualifying heat as well as the final.

He ran 10.04 seconds to finish fifth in the 100 metres at the Jamaican Olympic trials in June 2024. He ran as part of the Jamaican 4 x 100 metres relay team at the 2024 Olympic Games in Paris.
