= Ackeem Blake =

Jamaican sprinter

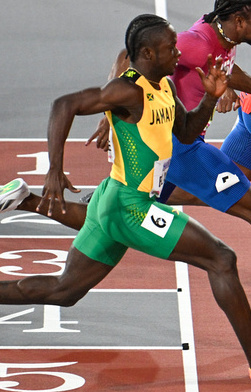
- Blake in 2024

Personal information
- Born: 21 January 2002 (age 24)
- Height: 180 cm (5 ft 11 in)

Sport
- Country: Jamaica
- Sport: Athletics
- Events: 100 m, 200 m
- Club: Titans Track Club (prior), Dynamic Speed Track Club
- Coached by: Michael Frater

Achievements and titles
- Personal bests: Outdoor; 60 m: 6.42 (+0.9) (Kingston 2023); 100 m: 9.88 (+0.8) (Kingston 2025); 200 m: 20.45 (+0.7) (Kingston 2024)
Medal record
Men's athletics
Representing Jamaica
World Championships
Bronze medal – third place	2023 Budapest	4 × 100 m relay
World Ultimate Championship
Second place	2026 Budapest	Mixed 4 × 100 m relay
World Indoor Championships
Bronze medal – third place	2024 Glasgow	60 m
World Relay Championships
Gold medal – first place	2026 Gaborone	Mixed 4 × 100 m relay
Diamond League
First place	2024 Brussels	100 m
Third place	2025 Zurich	100 m
NACAC Championships
Gold medal – first place	2022 Freeport	100 m
Bronze medal – third place	2022 Freeport	4 × 100 m relay
NACAC Championships (U18)
Bronze medal – third place	2019 Queretaro	100 m

Ackeem Blake (born 21 January 2002) is a Jamaican sprinter.

Blake came fourth in the 4 × 100 metres relay at the 2022 World Athletics Championships in Eugene, Oregon. At the 2023 World Athletics Championships in Budapest, Hungary he earned a bronze medal in the men's 4 × 100 metres relay. In Gaborone, Botswana, at the 2026 World Athletics Relays Championships, he won gold in world record time running the mixed 4 × 100 metres relay.

== 2022 ==
In 2022, Blake competed at the Music City Track Carnival in Nashville, he ran a big personal best of 9.92s in the 100 m. However, World Athletics deemed the time to be unofficial and therefore it was not ratified. Blake did run sub-10 officially for the first time 7 days later at the New York City Grand Prix, clocking a time of 9.95s.

Blake improved his time at the 2022 Jamaican Championships, finishing 3rd in the final with a time of 9.93s. He was selected for the 2022 World Championships, he finished fourth in his semi-final and did not make the final. Blake ran on the first leg of Jamaica's 4 × 100 m relay team as they finished fourth.

== 2023 ==
In 2023, Blake set a Jamaican record in the 60 m, clocking 6.42 s at the Gibson McCook Relays in Kingston. He ran a new personal best at the Los Angeles Grand Prix with a time of 9.89s. At the Jamaican Championships, Blake finished fourth in a time of 10.01s and was selected for Jamaica's 4 × 100 m relay team at the 2023 World Championships, he ran on the first leg as his team won the bronze medal.

== 2024 ==
Blake finished third gaining bronze in the 60 m at the 2024 World Indoor Championships in a time of 6.46s. He finished third at the 2024 Jamaican Olympic Trials with a time of 9.92 and was selected for the Jamaican team at the Paris Olympics. In Paris, he came fifth with 10.06 in the semifinal and failed to make the finals.

== 2025 ==
At the 2025 World Athletics Championships in Tokyo, Japan, he made the semifinals in the 100 metres.

== 2026 ==
Blake competed in the 60 metres clocking 6.55 in the semifinals to finish 4th, so he did not advance to the finals at the 2026 World Athletics Indoor Championships in Torun, Poland.

In Gaborone, Botswana, at the 2026 World Athletics Relays Championships, he and his teammates won gold in the mixed 4 × 100 metres relay clocking a new WR of 39.62, after the previous WR 39.99 they set the day before in the heats. Jamaica is the first country to reach sub-40 seconds in this event.

In September, to close the season, he ran the first leg for the Jamaican mixed 4 × 100 m relay team that earned silver in 39.72 at the inaugural 2026 World Athletics Ultimate Championship in Budapest, Hungary.

== Competitions record ==
Grand Slam Track results
Slam	Race group	Event	Pl.	Time	Prize money
2025 Kingston Slam	Short sprints	100 m	4th	10.13	US$20,000
2025 Kingston Slam	Short sprints	200 m	7th	20.68	US$20,000
2025 Miami Slam	Short sprints	100 m	3rd	9.85	US$20,000
2025 Miami Slam	Short sprints	200 m	8th	21.09	US$20,000

Year	Competition	Venue	Position	Event	Notes
Representing Jamaica
2019	NACAC U18 Championships	Querétaro, Mexico	3rd	100 m	10.41
2022	World Championships	Eugene, United States	18th (sf)	100 m	10.19
2022	World Championships	Eugene, United States	4th	4 × 100 m relay	38.06
2022	NACAC Championships	Freeport, Bahamas	1st	100 m	9.98 CR
2022	NACAC Championships	Freeport, Bahamas	3rd	4 × 100 m relay	38.94
2023	World Championships	Budapest, Hungary	3rd	4 × 100 m relay	37.76
2024	World Indoor Championships	Glasgow, United Kingdom	3rd	60 m	6.46
2024	Olympic Games	Paris, France	17th (sf)	100 m	10.06
2024	Olympic Games	Paris, France	11th (h)	4 × 100 m relay	38.45
2025	World Championships	Tokyo, Japan	17th (sf)	100 m	10.12
2025	World Championships	Tokyo, Japan	–	4 × 100 m relay	DNF
2026	World Indoor Championships	Toruń, Poland	7th (sf)	60 m	6.55
2026	World Relays	Gaborone, Botswana	1st	Mixed 4 × 100 m relay	39.62 WR
2026	Commonwealth Games	Glasgow, United Kingdom	10th (sf)	100 m	10.06
2026	Commonwealth Games	Glasgow, United Kingdom	6th	4 × 100 m relay	39.07
2026	World Ultimate Championships	Budapest, Hungary	15th (h)	100 m	10.21
2026	World Ultimate Championships	Budapest, Hungary	2nd	Mixed 4 × 100 m relay	39.72
