= Joseph Oduro Manu =

Ghanaian sprinter (born 1996)

Joseph Oduro Manu (born 26 July 1996) is a Ghanaian sprinter, who currently competes at Coppin State University in Baltimore, MD.

Manu was selected to represent Ghana at the 2021 World Relays on 1–2 May in Poland, which served as a qualifier for the 2021 Olympic Games and the 2022 World Championships for Ghana. In the final Manu helped Ghana to bronze with a time of 39.11 seconds, but the team was disqualified after footage review showed Manu giving out the baton beyond the passing zone from teammate Joseph Amoah. However, because they qualified for the final with a time of 38.79 seconds in the semi-finals, Ghana with Amoah still qualified to compete at the Olympic Games.

== See also ==
- Ghana at the 2020 Summer Olympics
