= Centre sportif du Bout-du-Monde =

Sports center in Geneva, Switzerland

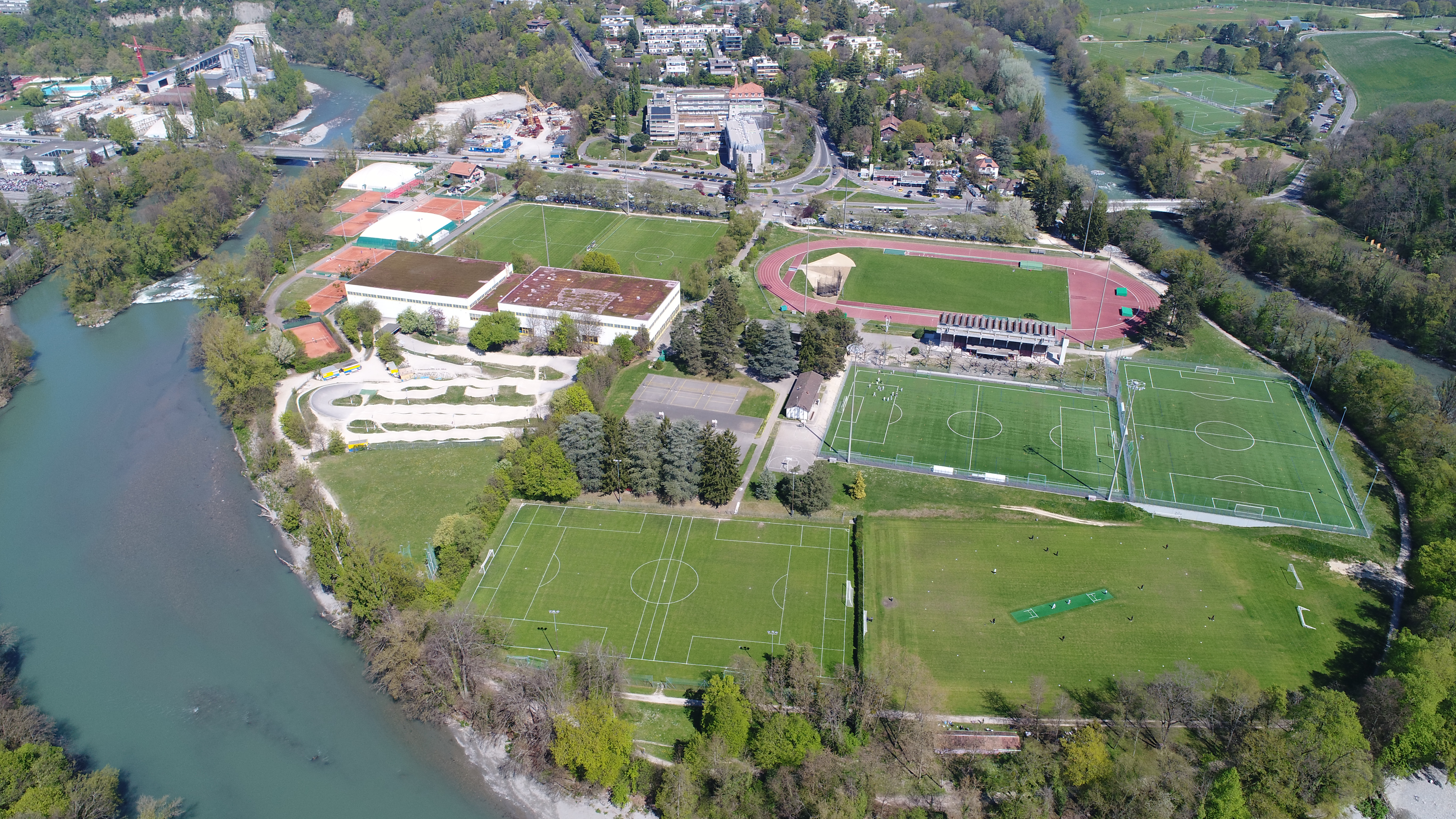
- Interactive map of Centre sportif du Bout-du-Monde
- Location: Champel, Geneva, Switzerland
- Coordinates: 46.18056°N 6.15676°E

Construction
- Opened: 1970

Tenant
- Racing Club Genève

Centre sportif du Bout-du-Monde, Bout-du-Monde Sports Center, is located on the banks of the Arve in the city of Geneva, Switzerland.

The site offers following outdoor sports grounds:

- two training and competition soccer fields in stabilized material and three competitive turf pitches in natural turf;
- a cricket field which can also be used for soccer training;
- three basketball courts;
- three volleyball courts;
- a complete athletic facility that meets IAAF standards;
- a climbing wall;
- a 1.3 km cross-country run;
- an illuminated bike trail.

== Address ==
Centre sportif du Bout-du-Monde
Route de Vessy 12
1206 Genève

== Access ==
The Bout-Du-Monde sports center is accessible thanks to the TPG, the lines serving the place are the 7 and the 11.
