= Marvin Bracy =

American sprinter and football player (born 1993)

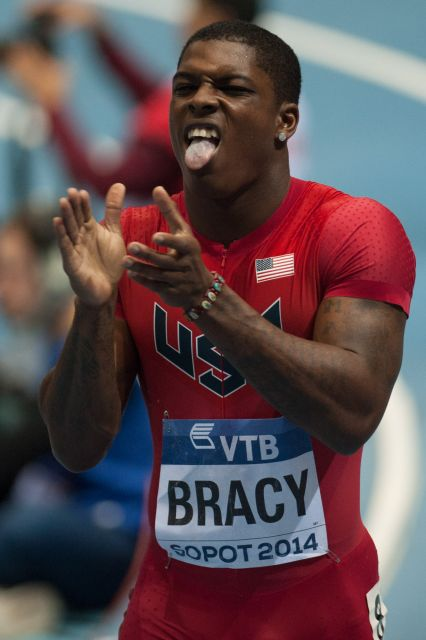
- Bracy during 2014 IAAF World Indoor Championships

Personal information
- Nationality: American
- Born: December 15, 1993 (age 32) Orlando, Florida, United States
- Height: 5 ft 9 in (1.75 m)
- Weight: 172 lb (78 kg)

Sport
- Sport: Track and Field
- Event: Sprint
- College team: Florida State Seminoles

Achievements and titles
- Personal bests: 60 meters: 6.44 (2022); 100 meters: 9.85 (2021, 2022); 200 meters: 20.55 (2014)
Medal record
Men's athletics
Representing the United States
World Championships
Silver medal – second place	2022 Eugene	100 m
Silver medal – second place	2022 Eugene	4×100 m relay
World Indoor Championships
Silver medal – second place	2014 Sopot	60 m
Bronze medal – third place	2022 Belgrade	60 m
World Junior Championships
Gold medal – first place	2010 Moncton	4×100 m
Pan American Junior Championships
Gold medal – first place	2011 Miramar	100 m
Gold medal – first place	2011 Miramar	4×100 m relay
- Football career

Profile
- Position: Wide receiver

Career information
- High school: Orlando (FL) Boone
- College: Florida State
- NFL draft: 2017: undrafted

Career history
- Indianapolis Colts (2017)*; Seattle Seahawks (2018)*; Orlando Apollos (2019)
- * Offseason or practice squad member only

Marvin Bracy-Williams (born December 15, 1993) is an American former sprinter, and a former professional football wide receiver. He played college football for the Florida State Seminoles, and quit just prior to their 2013 national championship season to pursue a professional career in track. He holds personal bests of 9.85s in the 100 m and 6.44 s in the 60 m, which he set in 2022 at the 2022 World Athletics Indoor Championships in Belgrade, Serbia. He won three straight U.S. National Championships at 60 meters in 2014–16. In July 2016, Bracy came in third in the 100 meters at the U.S. Olympic Trials qualifying for the 2016 Summer Olympics.

Bracy-Williams is under sanctions for repeated anti-doping violations. He announced his intent to retire to USADA on June 5, 2026, but would serve a 12 year ban if he chose to return to the sport.

== Early life ==
=== Football ===
Bracy attended William R. Boone High School in Orlando, Florida, where he also played American football at the wide receiver position. In August 2010, the Orlando Sentinel ranked him as the No. 6 prospect from Central Florida in the class of 2012. By October 2010 he had received at least six scholarship offers, including from Florida State University and the University of Miami. In July 2011, Bracy committed to Florida State University for football and track.

Bracy participated in the 2012 Under Armour All-America Game. He made ESPN SportsCenter’s top 10 plays of the night with an acrobatic one-handed, 32-yard touchdown reception in the first quarter.

=== Track ===
At the Florida High School Class 4A track and field meet in May 2010, Bracy swept the 100 meter and 200 meter dash. He won the 100 meter in a wind assisted 10.19 seconds, the fastest time in state meet history. His fastest legal time of the season, 10.42, tied Damiere Byrd and Odean Skeen for third place among youth sprinters in 2010, behind David Bolarinwa and Miles Shuler.

Easily the youngest in a race dominated by college runners, Bracy finished sixth in the 100-meter dash at the USA Track & Field Junior National Championships in Des Moines, Iowa. In July, at the 2010 World Junior Championships in Athletics in Moncton, Canada, Bracy ran a relay leg for the U.S. squad in the 4×100 meters relay heat.

He was an All-USA high school track and field team selection by USA Today in 2010, and 2011.

On March 26, 2011, Bracy won the men's open 100-meter dash title at FSU Relays in Tallahassee. He clocked a 10.28-second time, a new career best. Bracy also tied for No. 4 on the Florida all-time list with 2008 Olympic bronze medalist Walter Dix, who clocked a 10.28 time as a Coral Springs High School senior in 2004.

In June 2011 Bracy ran away with the 100-meter dash title at the 2011 USA Track and Field Junior Championships in Eugene, Oregon, clocking the second-fastest time in Florida high school history, in a wind assisted 10.05 seconds. Only Jeff Demps.

Starting of the 2012 track season, Bracy ran a world leading 6.08 seconds in the 55 meters at the Jimmy Carnes Youth Invitational track and field meet in Gainesville. He competed in the 2012 United States Olympic Trials.

On February 8, 2014, he won the 60 meters at the New Balance Indoor Grand Prix. Bracy, along with sprinter Trell Kimmons, will represent the United States at the 2014 IAAF World Indoor Championships from Sopot, Poland.

== Professional track career ==
On March 8, 2014, he placed 2nd in the 60m in the IAAF Indoor World Championships in Sopot, Poland.

On August 10, 2014, Bracy was runner-up in the 100 meters to Asafa Powell who ran 10.02 to Bracy's 10.14 in Brazil.

On March 12, 2016, Bracy won 60 meters in 6.502 seconds at 2016 USA Indoor Track and Field Championships.

On March 18, 2016, Bracy was a finalist placing 7th in 60 meters at 2016 IAAF World Indoor Championships.

In the 2016 U.S. Olympic Team Trials in Eugene, Oregon, Bracy finished 3rd in a time of 9.98 seconds, earning a spot on the U.S. team for the Olympics.

== Professional football career ==
=== Indianapolis Colts ===
On August 7, 2017, Bracy signed with the Indianapolis Colts as a wide receiver, having not played organized American football since he was a redshirt freshman at Florida State in 2012. He was waived on September 2, 2017.

=== Seattle Seahawks ===
On July 28, 2018, Bracy signed with the Seattle Seahawks. He was waived on August 8, 2018. He was re-signed on August 20. He was waived on September 1, 2018.

=== Alliance of American Football ===
In 2019, Bracy signed with the Orlando Apollos of the Alliance of American Football. He was placed on injured reserve on February 11, 2019, after suffering a shoulder injury in the inaugural game on February 9. He was waived from injured reserve on March 18.

== Return to track ==
=== 2020 ===
Bracy-Williams returned to track in 2020, now coached by Rana Reider at Tumbleweed Track Club. He competed at the 2020 USA Indoor Track and Field Championships in the 60 meters, hoping to qualify for the World Athletics Indoor Championships in Nanjing, China. However, the sudden COVID-19 pandemic cut his season short.

=== 2021 ===
2021 proved to be a strong return for Bracy-Williams. After several lackluster performances above 10 seconds, he broke his personal best with 9.85 seconds at the NACAC New Life Invitational in Miramar, Florida. With the second-fastest time in the world, Bracy-Williams was a strong contender to make the Olympic team in Tokyo. At the Olympic trials, Bracy won his 100m heat in 10.00 seconds. However, in the semi-finals, he pulled up 40m into the race with an apparent hamstring injury. He raced in Hungary 2 weeks later, clocking 10.02 seconds.

6 weeks later, Bracy equaled his personal best of 9.85 at the American Track League #6 meeting in Memphis, Tennessee, this time into a -0.4 m/s headwind.

=== 2025 ===
In November 2025, USADA announced that Bracy-Williams had been issued with a three-year, nine-month ban (45 months) for anti-doping violations backdated to start of his provisional suspension in February 2024. His anti-doping violations include use of testosterone, attempted tampering, and whereabouts violations. USADA states Bracy-Williams received a significant reduction in his ban for assisting in a broader anti-doping investigation. In addition his results from June 1, 2023 were disqualified.

=== 2026 ===
In January 2026, Bracy-Williams joined the Enhanced Games. In February, a man was federally indicted for supplying Bracy-Williams with drugs. Rae Edwards claims he connected Bracy-Williams to a network of drug dealers for United States sprinters. In June 2026, Bracy-Williams was sanctioned for his third anti-doping violation. He announced his intent to retire to USADA, but would serve a 12 year ban for whereabouts failures if he chose to return to the sport.

== Personal life ==
Bracy-William’s cousins, Simeon Thomas and Kermit Whitfield are currently free agents in the NFL.
