= Jerome Blake =

Canadian track and field athlete (b. 1995)

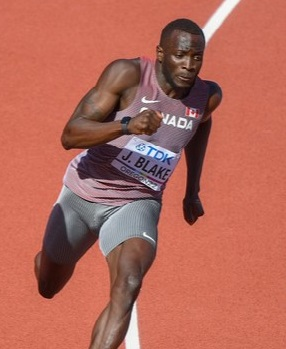
- Blake 2022 World Athletics Championships Day 4 - 200 m men Heat

Personal information
- Born: August 18, 1995 (age 31) Buff Bay, Jamaica
- Home town: Kelowna, British Columbia
- Height: 1.90 m (6 ft 3 in)
- Weight: 86 kg (190 lb)

Achievements and titles
- Personal bests: 100 m: 9.93 (2026); 200 m: 19.95 (2025)
Medal record
Men's athletics
Representing Canada
Olympic Games
Gold medal – first place	2024 Paris	4 × 100 m relay
Silver medal – second place	2020 Tokyo	4 × 100 m relay
World Championships
Gold medal – first place	2022 Eugene	4 × 100 m relay
Silver medal – second place	2025 Tokyo	4 × 100 m relay
World Athletics Relays
Silver medal – second place	2024 Nassau	4 × 100 m relay
Bronze medal – third place	2025 Guangzhou	4 × 100 m relay
Commonwealth Games
Silver medal – second place	2026 Glasgow	4 × 100 m relay
NACAC Championships
Gold medal – first place	2018 Toronto	4 × 100 m relay
Gold medal – first place	2025 Freeport	100 m
Gold medal – first place	2025 Freeport	4 × 100 m relay

Jerome Blake (born August 18, 1995) is a Canadian track and field athlete specializing in the sprint events. As a member of the Canadian 4 × 100 m relay team, he is the 2024 Olympic gold medallist, 2020 Olympic silver medallist and the 2022 World champion.

== Career ==
=== Early career ===
Blake was born in Buff Bay, Jamaica, where he started his young track career as a hurdler in the 400 m. After attending his brother's soccer game, he began testing his speed on track which a coach noticed and convinced him to switch to sprinting. The Blake family moved to Canada in 2013, taking up residence in Kelowna, British Columbia initially, and eventually moving to Burnaby. Because he did not acquire Canadian citizenship until 2018, he was unable to participate in many international junior competitions, though he remarked that had he been born in Canada "I probably would have been playing hockey." Blake competed for British Columbia at the 2017 Canada Summer Games where he won gold in both the 100 m and 200 m.

Debuting at the senior level, Blake soon became a regular member of Canada's relay teams, winning a gold medal at the 2018 NACAC Championships. Blake competed at the 2019 Pan American Games in Lima, finishing sixth in the 200 m and fourth in the 4 × 100 relay.

=== 2020 Summer Olympics ===
In the buildup to the 2020 Summer Olympics, which was taking place in 2021 due to the COVID-19 pandemic, Blake competed at the Canadian National Trials. There he placed in second place, and as a result, Blake was named to Canada's Olympic team. He then set a new personal best just before the games, running 10.15 seconds in Stockholm in early July. As a part of the 4 × 100 m relay team, he won a bronze medal in the 4 × 100 m relay. On 18 February 2022, Great Britain was stripped of its silver medal in the men's 4 × 100 m relay after the Court of Arbitration for Sport confirmed CJ Ujah's doping violation. Canada was upgraded to silver.

=== Individual success, World and Olympic relay gold ===
Following the Olympic season, Blake enjoyed a breakout year in terms of individual results, beginning with an upset victory in the 100 m at the USATF Bermuda Games that saw him finish ahead of American stars Noah Lyles and Erriyon Knighton. On the 2022 Diamond League circuit, he won a bronze medal at the British Grand Prix in Birmingham. The Canadian relay team won gold in the 4 × 100 m at the same event. In the 200 m, Blake won the Golden Spike Ostrava on May 31, narrowly beating Elijah Hall at the line.

At the 2022 World Athletics Championships in Eugene, Oregon, Blake did not make it out of the heats of the 100 m, but qualified to the semi-finals of the 200 m. Finishing third in his semi-final, he did not advance further, noting that it "wasn't what I wanted, but it is what it is. It's my first world championships, and I made it to the semifinals." In advance of the 4 × 100 m relay, the prospects of the Canadian team were called into question due to anchor runner Andre De Grasse's struggles with COVID-19 infection shortly before the championships. However, the Canadian team qualified for the finals with the third-fastest time in the heats, only 0.01 seconds out of second. In the final, the Canadians staged a major upset victory over the heavily favoured American team to take the gold medal, aided by smooth baton exchanges while the Americans made multiple fumbles, breaking the national record in the process. This was Canada's third gold in the event, and the others being consecutive Donovan Bailey-era wins in 1995 and 1997. The result "stunned" the heavily American crowd at Hayward Field, though De Grasse noted, "there's a lot of Canadian flags out there, a lot of fans cheering us on." Blake ran an 8.86 time on the second leg of the race, critical to the result.

Blake was initially named to the Canadian team for the 2022 Commonwealth Games but withdrew after the World Championships, with Athletics Canada citing a need "to properly recover and prepare for the rest of the season."

The 2023 World Athletics Championships proved a disappointment for the Canadian team, who were eliminated in the heats of the 4 × 100 metres relay and thus were unable to attempt a defence of its World title. In the leadup to the 2024 Summer Olympics, to be held in Paris, Blake joined the Canadian team at the 2024 World Athletics Relays, where they won the silver medal in the 4 × 100 metres relay, in the process securing Olympic qualification in that event as well. In the 4 × 100 metres relay event, the team finished third in their heat, and with the slowest time of the eight teams that reached the event final. In the final, the Canadians ran a season's best time of 37.50 and captured the gold medal, in what was widely considered a major upset victory, with a botched baton exchange ending the hopes of the heavily favoured American team. The result was heralded as one of the bigger surprises of the Paris Olympics. Blake called the result "a four person effort coming together to create something that everyone counted us out but us."

At the 2025 World Athletics Relays in Guangzhou, Blake joined the Canadian team in the 4 × 100 metres relay. In the event final, the Canadians won the bronze medal, despite a difficult baton exchange between Blake and teammate Aaron Brown.

At the 27th Anhalt Meeting in Dessau, Blake won the 100 metres in a wind-legal time of 9.97 seconds, breaking the 10-second barrier for the first time in his career.

== Statistics ==
Grand Slam Track results
Slam	Race group	Event	Pl.	Time	Prize money
2025 Miami Slam	Short sprints	100 m	7th	10.04	US$12,500
2025 Miami Slam	Short sprints	200 m	6th	20.40	US$12,500
