= Pablo Matéo =

French sprinter

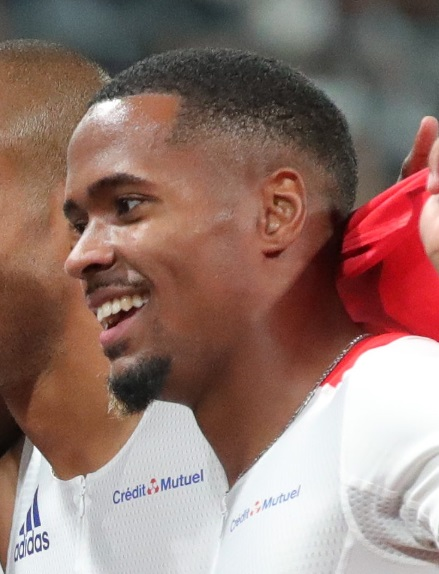
- Matéo in 2022

Personal information
- Nationality: French
- Born: 1 February 2001 (age 25) Évry, Essonne, France
- Height: 1.83 m (6 ft 0 in)

Sport
- Sport: Athletics
- Event: 100 metres
- Club: Stade bordelais athlétisme
- Coached by: Fabien Lambolez

Achievements and titles
- Personal bests: Outdoor; 100 m: 10.15 (Montreuil 2023); 200 m: 20.03 (Austin 2024); Indoor; 60 m: 6.62 (Albuquerque 2024); 200 m: 20.89 (Albuquerque 2024)
Medal record
Men's athletics
Representing France
World Relays
Bronze medal – third place	2024 Nassau	4×100 m relay
European Championships
Silver medal – second place	2022 Munich	4×100 m relay

Pablo Matéo (born 1 February 2001) is a French sprinter who specializes in the 100 metres. He won a silver medal in the 4×100 m relay at the 2022 European Athletics Championships.

In May 2023, he successively improves his personal best in the 100m to 10.18 seconds on May 13 in Nairobi, then to 10.15 seconds on May 31 in Montreuil. At the European U23 Championships in Espoo, he won the bronze medal in the 100 m in 10.18 seconds, and also won the silver medal in the 4 × 100 m relay.

Matéo competed for France at the 2024 Summer Olympics.
