= 2016 IAAF World U20 Championships – Men's 4 × 100 metres relay =

The men's 4 × 100 metres relay event at the 2016 IAAF World U20 Championships was held at Zdzisław Krzyszkowiak Stadium on 22 and 23 July.

== Medalists ==
Gold	Silver	Bronze
United States; Michael Norman Jr. Hakim Montgomery; Brandon Taylor; Noah Lyles; Amere Lattin*	Japan; Ippei Takeda; Jun Yamashita; Wataru Inuzuka; Kenta Oshima	Germany; Roger Gurski; Thomas Barthel; Niels Torben Giese; Manuel Eitel; Deniz Almas*

*Athletes who competed in heats only

== Records ==
World Junior Record	United States	38.66	Grosseto, Italy	18 July 2004
Championship Record	United States	38.66	Grosseto, Italy	18 July 2004
World Junior Leading	Chinese Taipei	39.51	Taoyuan, Taiwan	19 May 2016

== Results ==
=== Heats ===
Qualification: First 2 of each heat (Q) plus the 2 fastest times (q) qualified for the final.

Rank	Heat	Nation	Athletes	Time	Notes
1	3	Japan	Ippei Takeda, Jun Yamashita, Wataru Inuzuka, Kenta Oshima	39.53	Q, SB
2	3	Australia	Trae Williams, Jack Hale, Cameron Searle, Nicholas Andrews	39.67	Q
3	2	Germany	Deniz Almas, Thomas Barthel, Niels Torben Giese, Manuel Eitel	39.69	Q, SB
4	3	United States	Amere Lattin, Hakim Montgomery, Brandon Taylor, Noah Lyles	39.70	q, SB
5	2	Jamaica	Fabian Hewitt, Raheem Chambers, Jhevaughn Matherson, Hujaye Cornwall	39.80	Q
6	1	Great Britain	Zanson Plummer, Oliver Bromby, Ryan Gorman, Gerald Matthew	39.91	Q
7	2	Poland	Jakub Gałandziej, Adrian Wesela, Damian Sztejkowski, Eryk Hampel	39.98	q, SB
8	2	Spain	Aitor Same Ekobo, Manuel de Nicolás, Oriol Madi, Daniel Ambrós	40.09	SB
9	1	Italy	Nicholas Artuso, Freider Fornasari, Andrea Federici, Filippo Tortu	40.13	Q, SB
10	3	Barbados	Michael Nicholls, Mario Burke, Kentoine Browne, Jaquone Hoyte	40.14	NU20R
11	1	Chinese Taipei	Yeh Shou-po, Yang Chun-han, Liu Chao-hsuan, Cheng Po-yu	40.33	
12	3	Nigeria	Raymond Ekevwo, Soyemi Abiola, Godwin Ashien, Emmanuel Arowolo	40.39	SB
13	1	Botswana	Mompoloki Powane, Baboloki Thebe, Xholani Talane, Thabiso Sekgopi	40.41	SB
14	1	Ireland	Eoin Doherty, Cíllín Greene, Sean Lawlor, Joseph Ojewumi	40.48	NU20R
15	1	Portugal	Frederico Curvelo, Rafael Jorge, João Pinto, João Esteves	40.64	SB
16	2	New Zealand	Jordan Bolland, Hamish Gill, Jacob Matson, Ethan Holman	40.80	
	2	Brazil	Felipe dos Santos, Paulo André de Oliveira, Derick Silva, Willian Schramm Deschamps	DQ	R163.3(a)
	3	South Africa		DNS	

=== Final ===
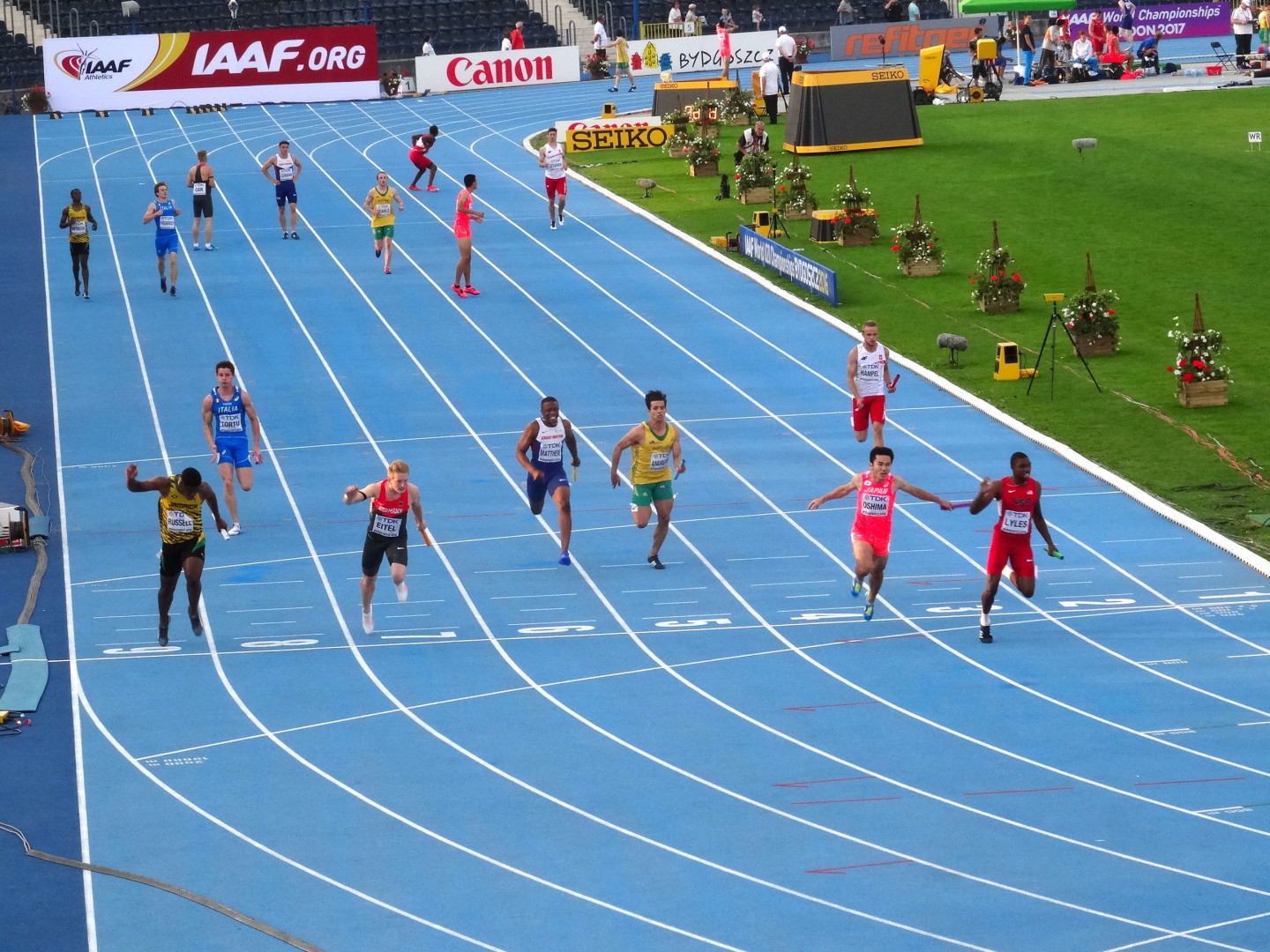
The finish

Rank	Lane	Nation	Athletes	Time	Notes
1st place, gold medalist(s)	3	United States	Michael Norman Jr., Hakim Montgomery, Brandon Taylor, Noah Lyles	38.93	WU20L
2nd place, silver medalist(s)	4	Japan	Ippei Takeda, Jun Yamashita, Wataru Inuzuka, Kenta Oshima	39.01	AU20R
3rd place, bronze medalist(s)	7	Germany	Roger Gurski, Thomas Barthel, Niels Torben Giese, Manuel Eitel	39.13	AU20R, Yellow card
4	9	Jamaica	Raheem Chambers, Nigel Ellis, Jhevaughn Matherson, De'Jour Russell	39.13	SB
5	5	Australia	Trae Williams, Jack Hale, Cameron Searle, Nicholas Andrews	39.57	SB
6	6	Great Britain	Zanson Plummer, Oliver Bromby, Ryan Gorman, Gerald Matthew	39.57	SB
7	8	Italy	Nicholas Artuso, Freider Fornasari, Andrea Federici, Filippo Tortu	40.02	SB
8	2	Poland	Jakub Gałandziej, Adrian Wesela, Damian Sztejkowski, Eryk Hampel	40.25	
