= 2016 IAAF World U20 Championships – Men's 200 metres =

The men's 200 metres event at the 2016 IAAF World U20 Championships was held at Zdzisław Krzyszkowiak Stadium on 21 and 22 July.

== Medalists ==
Gold	Michael Norman Jr. United States
Silver	Tlotliso Leotlela; South Africa
Bronze	Nigel Ellis; Jamaica

== Records ==
Standing records prior to the 2016 IAAF World U20 Championships in Athletics
World Junior Record	Usain Bolt (JAM)	19.93	Devonshire, Bermuda	11 April 2004
Championship Record	Andrew Howe (ITA)	20.28	Grosseto, Italy	16 July 2004
World Junior Leading	Noah Lyles (USA)	20.09	Eugene, United States	9 July 2016

== Results ==
=== Heats ===
Qualification: First 4 of each heat (Q) and the 4 fastest times (q) qualified for the semifinals.

Wind:
Heat 1: +1.3 m/s, Heat 2: +0.9 m/s, Heat 3: +1.6 m/s, Heat 4: -1.2 m/s, Heat 5: +1.3 m/s

Rank	Heat	Name	Nationality	Time	Note
1	4	Clarence Munyai	South Africa	20.40	Q
2	3	Tlotliso Leotlela	South Africa	20.63	Q
3	3	Roger Gurski	Germany	20.73	Q, PB
4	5	Michael Norman Jr.	United States	20.74	Q
5	4	Cameron Tindle	Great Britain	20.78	Q, PB
6	2	Ryan Gorman	Great Britain	20.84	Q, PB
7	3	Akanni Hislop	Trinidad and Tobago	20.87	Q, PB
8	2	Nigel Ellis	Jamaica	20.87	Q
9	4	Jun Yamashita	Japan	20.89	Q, PB
10	4	Mathias Hove Johansen	Norway	21.00	Q, PB
11	1	Vladislav Grigoryev	Kazakhstan	21.02	Q
12	1	Yang Chun-han	Chinese Taipei	21.11	Q
13	4	Marcus Tornée	Sweden	21.19	q, PB
14	1	Micaiah Harris	United States	21.19	Q
15	2	Emmanuel Arowolo	Nigeria	21.20	Q
16	5	Coull Graham	Antigua and Barbuda	21.31	Q
17	5	Hamish Gill	New Zealand	21.33	Q
18	2	Samson Colebrooke	Bahamas	21.35	Q
19	2	Ko Seung-hwan	South Korea	21.35	q
20	4	Trae Williams	Australia	21.40	q
21	1	Wataru Inuzuka	Japan	21.41	Q
22	5	Vinicius Moraes	Brazil	21.46	Q
23	1	Moffat Ngari Wanjiru	Kenya	21.47	q
24	2	Moussa Ali Issa	Bahrain	21.53	
25	3	Xholani Talane	Botswana	21.64	Q
26	5	Dániel Szabó	Hungary	21.78	
27	1	Lee Gyu-hyeong	South Korea	21.84	
28	3	Ezequiel Suárez	Puerto Rico	21.93	
29	4	Kentoine Browne	Barbados	22.00	
30	2	Dicki-Terry Mael	Vanuatu	22.06	NU20R
31	1	Mahmoud El Daou	Lebanon	22.39	
32	1	Jessy Franco	Gibraltar	22.44	
33	3	Pascual Ochaga	Equatorial Guinea	24.70	PB
	5	Loïc Prevot	France	DNF	
	3	Hujaye Cornwall	Jamaica	DQ	R163.3(a)
	2	Arturo Deliser	Panama	DNS	
	3	Mohamed Fares Jlassi	Tunisia	DNS	
	5	Mario Burke	Barbados	DNS	

=== Semifinals ===
Qualification: First 2 of each heat (Q) and the 2 fastest times (q) qualified for the final.

Wind:
Heat 1: +1.5 m/s, Heat 2: +1.1 m/s, Heat 3: +2.0 m/s

Rank	Heat	Name	Nationality	Time	Note
1	1	Clarence Munyai	South Africa	20.54	Q
2	3	Tlotliso Leotlela	South Africa	20.58	Q
3	1	Roger Gurski	Germany	20.64	Q, PB
4	1	Jun Yamashita	Japan	20.67	q, PB
5	2	Michael Norman Jr.	United States	20.71	Q
5	1	Cameron Tindle	Great Britain	20.71	q
7	3	Nigel Ellis	Jamaica	20.78	Q
8	2	Yang Chun-han	Chinese Taipei	20.90	Q
9	2	Ryan Gorman	Great Britain	20.91	
10	1	Micaiah Harris	United States	20.97	
11	3	Vladislav Grigoryev	Kazakhstan	21.08	
12	3	Emmanuel Arowolo	Nigeria	21.16	
13	2	Mathias Hove Johansen	Norway	21.19	
14	2	Coull Graham	Antigua and Barbuda	21.24	PB
15	1	Vinicius Moraes	Brazil	21.25	
16	3	Samson Colebrooke	Bahamas	21.30	PB
17	3	Wataru Inuzuka	Japan	21.40	
18	1	Xholani Talane	Botswana	21.40	
19	1	Moffat Ngari Wanjiru	Kenya	21.48	
20	2	Hamish Gill	New Zealand	21.49	
21	3	Trae Williams	Australia	21.49	
22	2	Ko Seung-hwan	South Korea	21.50	
23	2	Marcus Tornée	Sweden	21.70	
	3	Akanni Hislop	Trinidad and Tobago	DNF	

=== Final ===
Wind: +1.2 m/s

Rank	Lane	Name	Nationality	Time	Note
1st place, gold medalist(s)	6	Michael Norman Jr.	United States	20.17	CR
2nd place, silver medalist(s)	5	Tlotliso Leotlela	South Africa	20.59	
3rd place, bronze medalist(s)	8	Nigel Ellis	Jamaica	20.63	
4	4	Clarence Munyai	South Africa	20.77	
5	9	Yang Chun-han	Chinese Taipei	20.81	
6	7	Roger Gurski	Germany	20.81	
7	3	Cameron Tindle	Great Britain	20.82	
8	2	Jun Yamashita	Japan	20.94	
