= 2015 World Youth Championships in Athletics – Boys' 100 metres =

Boys' 100 metres at the 2015 World Youth Championships in Athletics
- Venue: Estadio Olímpico Pascual Guerrero
- Dates: 15 July
- Competitors: 48 from 35 nations
- Winning time: 10.28

Medalists
gold medal	Abdul Hakim Sani Brown	Japan
silver medal	Derick Silva	Brazil
bronze medal	Rechmial Miller	Great Britain

The boys' 100 metres at the 2015 World Youth Championships in Athletics was held at the Estadio Olímpico Pascual Guerrero in Cali, Colombia on 15 July 2015.

== Records ==
Prior to the competition, the following records were as follows.

World Youth Best	Yoshihide Kiryū (JPN)	10.19	Fukuroi, Japan	3 November 2012
Championship Record	Darrel Brown (TTO)	10.31	Debrecen, Hungary	13 July 2001
World Youth Leading	Abdul Hakim Sani Brown (JPN)	10.30	Tokyo, Japan	10 May 2015

== Results ==
=== Round 1 ===
First 3 in each heat (Q) and the next 6 fastest (q) advance to the semifinals.

Rank	Heat	Name	Nationality	Time	Note
1	1	Abdul Hakim Sani Brown	Japan	10.30	Q, CR
2	4	Derick Silva	Brazil	10.42	Q
3	6	Rechmial Miller	Great Britain	10.49	Q, PB
4	3	Kyle Appel	South Africa	10.52	Q, PB
4	4	Edel Amores	Cuba	10.52	Q
6	2	Akanni Hislop	Trinidad and Tobago	10.53	Q
6	5	Oliver Bromby	Great Britain	10.53	Q
8	1	Paulo André de Oliveira	Brazil	10.56	Q
9	1	Simon Hansen	Denmark	10.57	Q, PB
10	4	Xavior Angus	Jamaica	10.59	Q
11	3	Luo Wenyi	China	10.60	Q
12	5	Daisuke Miyamoto	Japan	10.61	Q
12	6	Milo Skupin-Alfa	Germany	10.61	Q, PB
12	3	Javan Martin	Bahamas	10.61	Q
15	3	Khairul Hafiz Jantan	Malaysia	10.62	q, PB
16	3	Daniel Estrada	United States	10.65	q, PB
17	2	Jack Hale	Australia	10.66	Q
18	2	Cheuk Hei Herry Wong	Hong Kong	10.70	Q, PB
19	2	Chuba Nwachukwu	Canada	10.71	q
20	5	Micaiah Harris	United States	10.72	Q
21	1	Saeed Al-Khaldi	Bahrain	10.78	q, PB
22	2	Andre Morrison	Jamaica	10.79	q
22	1	Maximilian Münzker	Austria	10.79	q
24	5	Burhan Wardhani	Indonesia	10.80	PB
25	2	Thomas Barthel	Germany	10.81	
26	6	Jordan Shelley	Australia	10.84	Q
26	6	Steffen Udengaard Knudsen	Denmark	10.84	
28	5	Tang Yao	China	10.86	
29	4	Caesar Compton	Guyana	10.87	PB
30	4	Asnawi Hashim	Malaysia	10.90	
31	4	Wayne Griffin	Saint Kitts and Nevis	10.91	
32	5	Daniel Ambrós	Spain	10.92	
33	4	Thabiso Sekgopi	Botswana	10.94	
34	6	Coull Graham	Antigua and Barbuda	10.96	
35	3	Nicolás Thomson	Colombia	11.03	
36	1	Perez Knowles	Bahamas	11.10	
37	5	Jherson Viáfara	Colombia	11.11	
38	6	Shen Yu-sen	Chinese Taipei	11.12	
39	4	Sergio López	Spain	11.14	
40	3	Abdulelah Al-Nashri	Saudi Arabia	11.24	
41	3	Mahamat Goubaye Youssouf	Chad	11.36	PB
42	6	Taurere Tegenahau	French Polynesia	11.41	
43	5	James Bregal	Belize	11.44	PB
44	1	Lester Enamorado	Honduras	11.60	PB
45	2	Scheyenne Sanitoa	American Samoa	11.72	
46	2	Mobera Tonana	Kiribati	11.89	PB
47	1	Enzo Faulbaum	Chile	12.45	
48	6	Iasen Ikelap	Federated States of Micronesia	13.41	PB

=== Semifinal ===
First 2 in each heat (Q) and the next 2 fastest (q) advance to the final.

Rank	Heat	Name	Nationality	Time	Note
1	2	Abdul Hakim Sani Brown	Japan	10.30	Q, CR
2	1	Rechmial Miller	Great Britain	10.45	Q, PB
3	3	Derick Silva	Brazil	10.49	Q
4	2	Oliver Bromby	Great Britain	10.50	Q
5	1	Daisuke Miyamoto	Japan	10.52	Q
6	1	Chuba Nwachukwu	Canada	10.55	q, PB
7	1	Paulo André de Oliveira	Brazil	10.58	q
8	3	Milo Skupin-Alfa	Germany	10.59	Q, PB
9	2	Daniel Estrada	United States	10.60	PB
9	3	Luo Wenyi	China	10.60	
11	3	Xavior Angus	Jamaica	10.61	
11	3	Akanni Hislop	Trinidad and Tobago	10.61	
13	2	Edel Amores	Cuba	10.63	
14	2	Simon Hansen	Denmark	10.65	
15	3	Micaiah Harris	United States	10.67	PB
16	1	Javan Martin	Bahamas	10.69	
17	2	Jack Hale	Australia	10.70	
18	2	Khairul Hafiz Jantan	Malaysia	10.74	
19	1	Cheuk Hei Herry Wong	Hong Kong	10.75	
20	3	Jordan Shelley	Australia	10.83	
20	1	Saeed Al-Khaldi	Bahrain	10.83	
20	3	Maximilian Münzker	Austria	10.83	
23	2	Andre Morrison	Jamaica	10.85	
–	1	Kyle Appel	South Africa	DQ	

=== Final ===
Rank	Name	Nationality	Time	Note
1st place, gold medalist(s)	Abdul Hakim Sani Brown	Japan	10.28	CR
2nd place, silver medalist(s)	Derick Silva	Brazil	10.49	
3rd place, bronze medalist(s)	Rechmial Miller	Great Britain	10.59	
4	Oliver Bromby	Great Britain	10.60	
5	Chuba Nwachukwu	Canada	10.60	
6	Milo Skupin-Alfa	Germany	10.67	
7	Daisuke Miyamoto	Japan	10.78	
8	Paulo André de Oliveira	Brazil	10.83	
