= 2015 World Youth Championships in Athletics – Boys' 200 metres =

Boys' 200 metres at the 2015 World Youth Championships in Athletics
- Venue: Estadio Olímpico Pascual Guerrero
- Dates: 17–19 July
- Competitors: 61 from 45 nations
- Winning time: 20.34

Medalists
gold medal	Abdul Hakim Sani Brown	Japan
silver medal	Kyle Appel	South Africa
bronze medal	Josephus Lyles	United States

The boys' 200 metres at the 2015 World Youth Championships in Athletics was held at the Estadio Olímpico Pascual Guerrero in Cali, Colombia from 17 to 19 July 2015.

== Records ==
Prior to the competition, the following records were as follows.

World Youth Best	Usain Bolt (JAM)	20.13	Bridgetown, Barbados	20 July 2003
Championship Record	Usain Bolt (JAM)	20.40	Sherbrooke, Canada	13 July 2003
World Youth Leading	Abdul Hakim Sani Brown (JPN)	20.56	Niigata, Japan	26 June 2015

== Results ==
=== Round 1 ===
First 2 in each heat (Q) and the next 8 fastest (q) advance to the semifinals.

Rank	Heat	Name	Nationality	Time	Note
1	8	Gift Leotlela	South Africa	20.82	Q
2	8	Maxwell Willis	United States	20.99	Q, PB
3	7	Derick Silva	Brazil	21.07	Q
4	4	Josephus Lyles	United States	21.07	Q
5	2	Toby Harries	Great Britain	21.12	Q
6	5	Abdul Hakim Sani Brown	Japan	21.19	Q
6	3	Cameron Tindle	Great Britain	21.19	Q
8	3	Luo Wenyi	China	21.22	Q
9	2	Xavior Angus	Jamaica	21.26	Q
10	6	Jack Hale	Australia	21.31	Q
11	7	Loïc Prévot	France	21.41	Q
11	2	Michele Rancan	Italy	21.41	q, PB
13	3	Simon Hansen	Denmark	21.45	q, PB
14	5	Edel Amores	Cuba	21.46	Q
14	2	Khairul Hafiz Jantan	Malaysia	21.46	q, PB
16	1	Kyle Appel	South Africa	21.52	Q
17	2	Thomas Barthel	Germany	21.54	q, PB
18	6	Kazuki Tamura	Japan	21.60	Q
19	4	Yu Yang	China	21.62	Q
20	8	Brandon Herrigan	Australia	21.69	q
20	7	Steffen Knudsen	Denmark	21.69	q, PB
20	8	Manuel de Nicolás	Spain	21.69	q, PB
23	7	Aaron Kimutai	Kenya	21.73	q, PB
24	6	Gediminas Truskauskas	Lithuania	21.75	PB
25	7	Donovan Storr	Bahamas	21.76	
26	1	Nico Garea	Austria	21.82	Q
26	6	Grega Pavlovič	Slovenia	21.82	PB
28	4	Michael Bentley	Jamaica	21.91	
28	3	Caesar Compton	Guyana	21.91	PB
30	2	Tinotenda Matiyenga	Zimbabwe	21.93	PB
31	8	Miquel Shepper	Suriname	21.96	
32	5	Aobakwe Malau	Botswana	22.02	PB
32	5	Nicolás Thomson	Colombia	22.02	
34	4	Burhan Wardhani	Indonesia	22.03	PB
35	2	Mathias Hove Johansen	Norway	22.05	
36	8	Ahmed Saleh Mahda	Saudi Arabia	22.06	PB
37	3	Zhalolitdin Khamrokulov	Uzbekistan	22.08	
37	6	Markson Sirere	Kenya	22.08	
39	3	Thabiso Sekgopi	Botswana	22.11	
40	5	Maximilian Münzker	Austria	22.13	PB
41	8	Jaime Smith	Panama	22.23	
42	4	Alberto Antelo	Bolivia	22.28	
43	3	Bayraktar Berkay Çalik	Turkey	22.31	
44	7	Shane Tuvusa	Fiji	22.40	
45	1	Ibrahim Abdelgader	Sudan	22.43	
46	6	Muhammad Hariz Bin Darajit	Singapore	22.53	
47	4	Wayne Griffin	Saint Kitts and Nevis	22.54	
48	1	Fernando Virgilio	Spain	22.57	
49	2	Jherson Viáfara	Colombia	22.65	SB
50	1	Javan Martin	Bahamas	22.75	
51	1	Louis-Maxime Bois	Canada	34.84	
–	5	Paulo André de Oliveira	Brazil	DNF	
–	1	Coull Graham	Antigua and Barbuda	DQ	
–	5	Márk Pálmai	Hungary	DQ	
–	7	Mohamed Abdelazim	Sudan	DQ	
–	4	Dwayne Koroka	Papua New Guinea	DQ	
–	5	Akanni Hislop	Trinidad and Tobago	DNS	
–	6	Becker Jarquín Ulloa	Nicaragua	DNS	
–	4	Enzo Faulbaum	Chile	DNS	
–	3	Saeed Al-Khaldi	Bahrain	DNS	
–	7	Shen Yu-sen	Chinese Taipei	DNS	

=== Semifinal ===
First 2 in each heat (Q) and the next 2 fastest (q) advance to the final.

Rank	Heat	Name	Nationality	Time	Note
1	1	Abdul Hakim Sani Brown	Japan	20.62	Q
2	3	Kyle Appel	South Africa	20.79	Q
3	3	Derick Silva	Brazil	20.92	Q, PB
4	2	Josephus Lyles	United States	20.93	Q, PB
5	3	Cameron Tindle	Great Britain	20.93	q
6	1	Edel Amores	Cuba	21.07	Q, PB
7	2	Toby Harries	Great Britain	21.10	Q
8	1	Gift Leotlela	South Africa	21.13	q
9	2	Luo Wenyi	China	21.29	
10	3	Kazuki Tamura	Japan	21.35	
11	1	Simon Hansen	Denmark	21.37	PB
12	2	Michele Rancan	Italy	21.51	
13	2	Xavior Angus	Jamaica	21.58	
14	1	Khairul Hafiz Jantan	Malaysia	21.64	
15	3	Yu Yang	China	21.67	
16	3	Thomas Barthel	Germany	21.69	
17	1	Loïc Prévot	France	21.78	
17	2	Nico Garea	Austria	21.78	
19	1	Aaron Kimutai	Kenya	21.95	
19	2	Steffen Knudsen	Denmark	21.95	
21	3	Manuel de Nicolás	Spain	22.02	
–	1	Jack Hale	Australia	DQ	
–	3	Maxwell Willis	United States	DQ	
–	2	Brandon Herrigan	Australia	DNS	

=== Final ===
Rank	Name	Nationality	Time	Note
1st place, gold medalist(s)	Abdul Hakim Sani Brown	Japan	20.34	CR
2nd place, silver medalist(s)	Kyle Appel	South Africa	20.57	PB
3rd place, bronze medalist(s)	Josephus Lyles	United States	20.74	PB
4	Derick Silva	Brazil	20.85	PB
5	Gift Leotlela	South Africa	20.86	
6	Toby Harries	Great Britain	20.92	PB
7	Edel Amores	Cuba	21.04	PB
8	Cameron Tindle	Great Britain	21.13	
