= Athletics at the 2019 Summer Universiade – Men's 200 metres =

The men's 200 metres event at the 2019 Summer Universiade was held on 10 and 11 July at the Stadio San Paolo in Naples.

== Medalists ==
| Gold | Silver | Bronze |
|---|---|---|
| Paulo André de Oliveira; Brazil | Chederick van Wyk; South Africa | Marcus Lawler; Ireland |

== Results ==
=== Heats ===
Qualification: First 2 in each heat (Q) and next 6 fastest (q) qualified for the semifinals.

Wind:
Heat 1: +0.3 m/s, Heat 2: +0.3 m/s, Heat 3: +0.3 m/s, Heat 4: -1.3 m/s, Heat 5: -0.3 m/s, Heat 6: -1.1 m/s, Heat 7: -0.8 m/s, Heat 8: -0.6 m/s, Heat 9: -0.5 m/s

| Rank | Heat | Name | Nationality | Time | Notes |
|---|---|---|---|---|---|
| 1 | 5 | Ko Seung-hwan | South Korea | 20.68 | Q, PB |
| 2 | 5 | Marcus Lawler | Ireland | 20.76 | Q |
| 3 | 1 | Chederick van Wyk | South Africa | 20.93 | Q |
| 4 | 9 | Yang Chun-han | Chinese Taipei | 20.94 | Q |
| 5 | 7 | Jun Yamashita | Japan | 20.97 | Q |
| 6 | 3 | César Ramírez | Mexico | 20.97 | Q |
| 7 | 8 | Jordan Broome | Great Britain | 21.05 | Q |
| 8 | 8 | Zdeněk Stromšík | Czech Republic | 21.06 | Q, PB |
| 9 | 6 | Ján Volko | Slovakia | 21.14 | Q |
| 10 | 4 | Paulo André de Oliveira | Brazil | 21.17 | Q |
| 11 | 1 | Yoshihiro Someya | Japan | 21.20 | Q |
| 12 | 8 | Rodrigo do Nascimento | Brazil | 21.21 | q |
| 13 | 9 | Wang Yu | China | 21.26 | Q |
| 14 | 7 | Muhammed Variyathodi | India | 21.27 | Q |
| 15 | 2 | Wei Tai-sheng | Chinese Taipei | 21.29 | Q |
| 16 | 6 | Simone Tanzilli | Italy | 21.29 | Q |
| 17 | 3 | Silvan Wicki | Switzerland | 21.35 | Q |
| 18 | 1 | Jiang Jiehua | China | 21.38 | q |
| 19 | 5 | Xholani Talane | Botswana | 21.38 | q, SB |
| 20 | 5 | Nutthapong Veeravongratanasiri | Thailand | 21.40 | q |
| 21 | 9 | Pietro Pivotto | Italy | 21.42 | q |
| 22 | 7 | Leon Tafirenyika | Zimbabwe | 21.42 | q, PB |
| 23 | 4 | Markus Fuchs | Austria | 21.43 | Q |
| 24 | 6 | Thabiso Sekgopi | Botswana | 21.50 | |
| 25 | 7 | Chayut Khongprasit | Thailand | 21.54 | |
| 26 | 9 | Damil Sutzhanov | Kazakhstan | 21.55 | |
| 27 | 1 | Benson Okot | Uganda | 21.57 | |
| 28 | 3 | Joachim Sandberg | Norway | 21.62 | |
| 29 | 2 | Imri Persiado | Israel | 21.65 | Q |
| 30 | 3 | Vadivelu Kannadasan | India | 21.65 | |
| 31 | 2 | Oleksiy Pozdnyakov | Ukraine | 21.67 | |
| 32 | 8 | Alexandru Terpezan | Romania | 21.74 | |
| 33 | 5 | Tan Zong Yang | Singapore | 21.75 | |
| 34 | 8 | Iván Eduardo Moreno | Mexico | 21.75 | |
| 35 | 8 | Sergey Russak | Kazakhstan | 21.87 | |
| 36 | 9 | Vojtěch Svoboda | Czech Republic | 21.97 | |
| 37 | 1 | Edgar Silwimba | Zambia | 22.00 | |
| 38 | 8 | Lukáš Púchovský | Slovakia | 22.03 | SB |
| 39 | 2 | Enzo Faulbaum | Chile | 22.03 | |
| 40 | 4 | Pablo Zuliani | Argentina | 22.08 | |
| 41 | 2 | Mohamad Merhe Mortada | Lebanon | 22.12 | |
| 42 | 6 | Rico Tse Yee Hin | Hong Kong | 22.13 | |
| 43 | 2 | Chan Yan Lam | Hong Kong | 22.14 | |
| 44 | 6 | Barnabas Aggerh | Ghana | 22.14 | |
| 45 | 4 | Mohamed Guettouche | Algeria | 22.29 | |
| 46 | 6 | Ahmed Jumah | Saudi Arabia | 22.29 | |
| 47 | 6 | Mantas Šeštokas | Lithuania | 22.32 | |
| 48 | 1 | Reinis Kreipāns | Latvia | 22.35 | PB |
| 49 | 2 | Obrey Chabala | Zambia | 22.35 | |
| 50 | 4 | Oliver Mwimba | Democratic Republic of the Congo | 22.40 | |
| 51 | 8 | Jakob Vodeb | Slovenia | 22.63 | |
| 52 | 3 | Rabiou Hima Matto | Niger | 22.81 | |
| 53 | 7 | Gihan Ranaweera | Sri Lanka | 22.87 | |
| 54 | 5 | Majid Khadeem Al-Maqbali | Oman | 23.23 | PB |
| 55 | 3 | Sean Kaufman | Philippines | 23.62 | |
| 56 | 3 | Jean Bruno Kadda | Central African Republic | 24.06 | |
| 57 | 7 | Saif Abdullah Al-Maqbali | Oman | 24.37 | PB |
| | 1 | Timothee Yap | Singapore | DNF | |
| | 4 | Sergio Germain | Chile | DNF | |
| | 5 | Abdullah Al-Subaie | Saudi Arabia | DNF | |
| | 3 | Yahaya Maliamungu | Uganda | DQ | R163.3a |
| | 5 | Edmond Murataj | Albania | DQ | R163.3a |
| | 1 | Frederik Schou-Nielsen | Denmark | DNS | |
| | 4 | Uzzal Sutradhar | Bangladesh | DNS | |
| | 4 | Carlos Nascimento | Portugal | DNS | |
| | 7 | Sarfo Ansah | Ghana | DNS | |
| | 7 | Karson Kowalchuk | Canada | DNS | |
| | 9 | Even Meinseth | Norway | DNS | |
| | 9 | Ionut-Andrei Neagoe | Romania | DNS | |

=== Semifinals ===
Qualification: First 2 in each heat (Q) and next 2 fastest (q) qualified for the final.

Wind:
Heat 1: -0.2 m/s, Heat 2: +0.2 m/s, Heat 3: -0.6 m/s

| Rank | Heat | Name | Nationality | Time | Notes |
|---|---|---|---|---|---|
| 1 | 1 | Paulo André de Oliveira | Brazil | 20.71 | Q |
| 2 | 1 | Jun Yamashita | Japan | 20.73 | Q |
| 3 | 1 | Marcus Lawler | Ireland | 20.73 | q |
| 4 | 3 | Chederick van Wyk | South Africa | 20.77 | Q |
| 5 | 2 | Jordan Broome | Great Britain | 20.80 | Q |
| 6 | 2 | Ján Volko | Slovakia | 20.83 | Q |
| 7 | 2 | Ko Seung-hwan | South Korea | 20.99 | q |
| 8 | 1 | Simone Tanzilli | Italy | 21.07 | |
| 9 | 3 | Zdeněk Stromšík | Czech Republic | 21.07 | Q, PB |
| 10 | 3 | Wei Tai-sheng | Chinese Taipei | 21.08 | |
| 11 | 2 | Yoshihiro Someya | Japan | 21.09 | |
| 12 | 1 | Silvan Wicki | Switzerland | 21.13 | |
| 13 | 3 | Muhammed Variyathodi | India | 21.18 | |
| 14 | 1 | Nutthapong Veeravongratanasiri | Thailand | 21.37 | |
| 15 | 3 | Markus Fuchs | Austria | 21.37 | |
| 16 | 2 | Imri Persiado | Israel | 21.40 | |
| 17 | 3 | Jiang Jiehua | China | 21.41 | |
| 18 | 3 | Pietro Pivotto | Italy | 21.48 | |
| 19 | 1 | Xholani Talane | Botswana | 21.68 | |
| 20 | 2 | Wang Yu | China | 21.69 | |
| 21 | 1 | Yang Chun-han | Chinese Taipei | 23.37 | |
| | 2 | Leon Tafirenyika | Zimbabwe | DNF | |
| | 2 | Rodrigo do Nascimento | Brazil | DQ | R163.3a |
| | 3 | César Ramírez | Mexico | DQ | R163.3a |

=== Final ===
Official Video

Wind: +0.5 m/s

| Rank | Lane | Name | Nationality | Time | Notes |
|---|---|---|---|---|---|
| 1st place, gold medalist(s) | 4 | Paulo André de Oliveira | Brazil | 20.28 | PB |
| 2nd place, silver medalist(s) | 6 | Chederick van Wyk | South Africa | 20.44 | PB |
| 3rd place, bronze medalist(s) | 2 | Marcus Lawler | Ireland | 20.55 | |
| 4 | 3 | Jun Yamashita | Japan | 20.58 | |
| 5 | 7 | Ján Volko | Slovakia | 20.66 | |
| 6 | 5 | Jordan Broome | Great Britain | 20.75 | |
| 7 | 1 | Ko Seung-hwan | South Korea | 21.09 | |
| 8 | 8 | Zdeněk Stromšík | Czech Republic | 21.32 | |
