= Raymond Ekevwo =

Nigerian sprinter (born 1999)

Personal information
- Nationality: Nigerian
- Born: 23 March 1999 (age 27) Ughelli, Nigeria
- Height: 1.78 m (5 ft 10 in)

Sport
- Sport: Track and field
- Event: 100 metres
- College team: Florida Gators
- Coached by: Mike Holloway

Achievements and titles
- Personal bests: 100 m – 9.96 (2019); 200 m – 20.84 (2019)
Medal record
Representing Nigeria
Men's athletics
African Games
Gold medal – first place	2019 Rabat	100 m
Silver medal – second place	2019 Rabat	4×100 m relay
2022 Commonwealth Games
Bronze medal – third place	2022 Birmingham	4×100 m relay

Raymond Ekevwo (born 23 March 1999) is a Nigerian sprinter. He is the 2019 African Games champion in the 100 metres. He was also a member of the Nigerian 4 × 100 m relay team that won a silver medal at the games.

Ekevwo's athletic talent had been obvious since his school days. In 2015, while still a student at High Standard Comprehensive School, Ughelli, he auditioned for the Making of Champions Reality TV athletics competition, Top Sprinter. He eventually had all judges trying to get him on their teams. He won the senior 100 m title and prize at the 2016 edition of the competition while still a junior.

He became the Nigerian junior champion in the 100 metres at the 2016 D K Olukoya Youth and Junior Championships winning with a then personal best of 10.35 s. As the national junior champion, he was selected to represent the country at the 2016 IAAF World U20 Championships. He however missed the race as the Nigerian team did not arrive in time for the competition. He took part in the 4 × 100 m relay with teammates Soyemi Abiola, Godwin Ashien and Emmanuel Arowolo but didn't progress to the finals.

Ekevwo joined Oral Roberts University for the 2017 - 2018 season but had a short season due to injuries. He eventually transferred to the University of Florida over the summer for the next season. A team of Ekevwo, Hakim Sani Brown, Grant Holloway and Ryan Clark became the 2019 NCAA champions in the 4 × 100 m relay.

He became the fifth Nigerian man to win the African Games title in the 100 m at the 2019 African Games in Rabat. After an unbeaten run through the rounds he clocked an impressive 9.96 s to win the title just ahead of Arthur Cisse. This mark set a new African Games record. He then teamed up with Divine Oduduru, Emmanuel Arowolo and Usheoritse Itsekiri for the 4 × 100 m relay. The team placed second behind the Ghanaian team to win the silver medal.

== Personal bests ==
60 metres: 6.53 s (Fayetteville 2020)

100 metres: 9.96 s (Rabat 2019)

200 metres: 20.84 s (Jacksonville 2019)

4 × 100 metres relay: 37.97 s (Austin 2019)
