= Chederick van Wyk =

South African sprinter

Personal information
- Nationality: South African
- Born: 18 February 1995 PRIESKA
- Height: 188 cm (6 ft 2 in)
- Weight: 75 kg (165 lb)

Sport
- Sport: Sprinting
- Events: 100 metres 200 metress
- Club: NWU

Chederick van Wyk (born 18 February 1995) is a sprinter from Prieska, a remote and rural town deep in the Karoo in the Northern Cape of South Africa

== Career ==
Van Wyk won the silver medal during 2019 IAAF World Relays, with the African record in the 4 × 200 metres relay.

During the 2019 Universiade in Naples, he won two more silver medals, 100 m and 200 m, just behind Paulo André de Oliveira.

Van Wyk was part of South Africa’s men’s quartet at the Tokyo Summer Olympic games in 2021 including Clarence Munyai, Shaun Maswanganyi and Akani Simbine. Munyai and Maswanganyi struggled to exchange and dropped the baton and therefore did not finish (DNF) the race and failed to progress to the final.

== International competitions ==
Year	Competition	Venue	Position	Event	Notes
Representing South Africa
2019	World Relays	Yokohama, Japan	2nd	4 × 200 m relay	1:20.42
2019	Universiade	Naples, Italy	2nd	100 m	10.23
2019	Universiade	Naples, Italy	2nd	200 m	20.44
2019	Universiade	Naples, Italy	–	4 × 100 m relay	DNF
2019	African Games	Rabat, Morocco	6th	100 m	10.31
2019	African Games	Rabat, Morocco	18th (sf)	200 m	21.22
2019	African Games	Rabat, Morocco	3rd	4 × 100 m relay	38.80
2021	Olympic Games	Tokyo, Japan	–	4 × 100 m relay	DNF

== Personal bests ==
Records personnels
Event		Time	Venue	Date
100 m	Outdoor	10.18	(South Africa) Sasolburg	28 April 2018
200 m	Outdoor	20.44	(Italy) Naples	11 July 2019
4 x 200 m	Outdoor	1:20.42 (AR)	(Japan) Yokohama	12 May 2019
