= Athletics at the 2019 Summer Universiade – Men's 100 metres =

The men's 100 metres event at the 2019 Summer Universiade was held on 8 and 9 July at the Stadio San Paolo in Naples.

== Medalists ==
Gold	Silver	Bronze
Paulo André de Oliveira; Brazil	Chederick van Wyk; South Africa	Rodrigo do Nascimento; Brazil

== Results ==
=== Preliminaries ===
Qualification: First 2 in each heat (Q) and next 5 fastest (q) qualified for the heats.

Wind:
Heat 1: -1.0 m/s, Heat 2: -0.4 m/s, Heat 3: -0.7 m/s, Heat 4: +1.5 m/s, Heat 5: +1.4 m/s

Rank	Heat	Name	Nationality	Time	Notes
1	4	Benjamin Azamati-Kwaku	Ghana	10.32	Q, PB
2	1	Sarfo Ansah	Ghana	10.64	Q, PB
3	3	Thabiso Sekgopi	Botswana	10.66	Q, SB
4	3	Ruttanapon Sowan	Thailand	10.72	Q
5	3	Amund Hoje Sjursen	Norway	10.73	q, SB
6	4	Timothee Yap	Singapore	10.80	Q
7	4	Oliver Mwimba	Democratic Republic of the Congo	10.85	q
8	1	Bayu Kertanegara	Indonesia	10.86	Q
9	5	Mantas Šeštokas	Lithuania	10.89	q
10	2	Lukáš Púchovský	Slovakia	10.91	Q
11	4	Emmanuel Nuwagaba	Uganda	10.97	q
12	3	Tilen Ovniček	Slovenia	10.99	q
13	2	Pablo Zuliani	Argentina	11.00	Q
14	2	Reinis Kreipāns	Latvia	11.03	SB
15	2	Yahaya Maliamungu	Uganda	11.05	
16	4	Usama Al-Gheilani	Oman	11.06	
17	2	Rabiou Hima Matto	Niger	11.14	
18	1	Gihan Ranaweera	Sri Lanka	11.36	
19	3	Lam Cho Kei	Macau	11.56	
20	4	Gerard Nepomuceno	Philippines	11.69	
21	1	Hassan Al-Onayzan	Saudi Arabia	11.75	
22	1	Sulaiyam Al-Sulaimi	Oman	11.76	
23	1	Sean Michael Kaufman	Philippines	11.81	
	2	Sujan Shrestha	Nepal	DNS	
	2	Yossi Dienga	Democratic Republic of the Congo	DNS	

=== Heats ===
Qualification: First 3 in each heat (Q) and next 3 fastest (q) qualified for the semifinals.

Wind:
Heat 1: +0.7 m/s, Heat 2: +0.7 m/s, Heat 3: +0.3 m/s, Heat 4: -0.4 m/s, Heat 5: -0.4 m/s, Heat 6: -0.2 m/s, Heat 7: 0.0 m/s, Heat 8: 0.0 m/s

Rank	Heat	Name	Nationality	Time	Notes
1	7	Chederick van Wyk	South Africa	10.29	Q
2	4	Paulo André de Oliveira	Brazil	10.32	Q
3	1	Ján Volko	Slovakia	10.36	Q
4	5	Rodrigo do Nascimento	Brazil	10.38	Q
5	1	Carlos Nascimento	Portugal	10.39	Q
6	1	Xuan Dajun	China	10.39	Q
7	5	Daisuke Miyamoto	Japan	10.41	Q
8	5	Zdeněk Stromšík	Czech Republic	10.42	Q
9	2	Dominik Záleský	Czech Republic	10.42	Q
10	4	Juan Carlos Alanis	Mexico	10.42	Q
10	6	Sarfo Ansah	Ghana	10.42	Q, PB
12	4	Bruno Dede	Japan	10.42	Q
13	7	Benjamin Azamati-Kwaku	Ghana	10.43	Q
14	6	Duan Asemota	Canada	10.44	Q
15	1	Johnathan Nyepa	Malaysia	10.47	q
15	4	Adam Thomas	Great Britain	10.47	q
17	1	Luca Antonio Cassano	Italy	10.48	q
18	3	Markus Fuchs	Austria	10.50	Q
18	7	Aleksandar Askovic	Germany	10.50	Q
20	7	Gurindervir Singh	India	10.54	
21	6	Thembo Monareng	South Africa	10.55	Q
22	2	Siripol Punpa	Thailand	10.55	Q
23	3	Wang Wei-hsu	Chinese Taipei	10.56	Q
24	6	Jiang Hengnan	China	10.57	
25	4	Alexandr Kasper	Kazakhstan	10.59	
26	8	Zach Holdsworth	Australia	10.63	
27	5	Harjit Singh	India	10.63	
28	7	Ruttanapon Sowan	Thailand	10.64	SB
29	5	Aykut Ay	Turkey	10.65	
30	3	Frederik Schou-Nielsen	Denmark	10.65	Q
31	3	Park Sie-young	South Korea	10.66	
32	2	Cheng Po-yu	Chinese Taipei	10.66	Q
33	6	Eko Rimbawan	Indonesia	10.67	
34	2	Hafiz Jantan	Malaysia	10.70	
35	6	Ionut-Andrei Neagoe	Romania	10.71	
36	6	Even Meinseth	Norway	10.73	
37	2	Rico Tse Yee Hin	Hong Kong	10.73	
38	3	Thabiso Sekgopi	Botswana	10.75	
39	1	Vitaliy Zems	Kazakhstan	10.75	
40	1	Bayu Kertanegara	Indonesia	10.79	PB
40	4	Ioan Andrei Melnicescu	Romania	10.79	
42	4	Mohamed Abdel Guettouche	Algeria	10.83	
43	7	Rodrigo Opazo	Chile	10.86	
44	2	Herry Wong Cheuk Hei	Hong Kong	10.88	
45	7	Edgar Silwimba	Zambia	10.91	
46	5	Mantas Šeštokas	Lithuania	10.92	
46	6	Lukáš Púchovský	Slovakia	10.92	
48	5	Pablo Zuliani	Argentina	10.97	
48	7	Timothee Yap	Singapore	10.97	
50	3	Tilen Ovniček	Slovenia	11.03	
51	2	Emmanuel Nuwagaba	Uganda	11.08	
52	4	Oliver Mwimba	Democratic Republic of the Congo	11.09	
53	1	Uzzal Sutradhar	Bangladesh	11.33	
54	3	Amund Hoje Sjursen	Norway	25.71	
	2	Ahmed Jumah	Saudi Arabia	DQ	R164.3
	3	Akanni Hislop	Trinidad and Tobago	DNS	

=== Semifinals ===
Qualification: First 2 in each heat (Q) and next 2 fastest (q) qualified for the final.

Wind:
Heat 1: -0.4 m/s, Heat 2: +0.4 m/s, Heat 3: -0.2 m/s

Rank	Heat	Name	Nationality	Time	Notes
1	1	Paulo André de Oliveira	Brazil	10.20	Q
2	3	Chederick van Wyk	South Africa	10.27	Q
3	3	Duan Asemota	Canada	10.36	Q
4	2	Rodrigo do Nascimento	Brazil	10.37	Q
5	2	Daisuke Miyamoto	Japan	10.37	Q
6	2	Ján Volko	Slovakia	10.39	q
7	1	Dominik Záleský	Czech Republic	10.45	Q
8	1	Carlos Nascimento	Portugal	10.45	q
9	2	Xuan Dajun	China	10.46	
10	2	Juan Carlos Alanis	Mexico	10.46	
11	1	Bruno Dede	Japan	10.50	
12	2	Zdeněk Stromšík	Czech Republic	10.51	
13	3	Markus Fuchs	Austria	10.53	
14	1	Benjamin Azamati-Kwaku	Ghana	10.54	
15	3	Sarfo Ansah	Ghana	10.54	PB
16	3	Luca Antonio Cassano	Italy	10.54	
17	3	Aleksandar Askovic	Germany	10.55	
18	3	Siripol Punpa	Thailand	10.56	
19	1	Johnathan Nyepa	Malaysia	10.59	
20	2	Adam Thomas	Great Britain	10.62	
21	1	Thembo Monareng	South Africa	10.67	
22	3	Frederik Schou-Nielsen	Denmark	10.67	
23	1	Wang Wei-hsu	Chinese Taipei	10.67	
24	2	Cheng Po-yu	Chinese Taipei	10.71	

=== Final ===
Official Video

Wind: -0.1 m/s

Rank	Lane	Name	Nationality	Time	Notes
1st place, gold medalist(s)	6	Paulo André de Oliveira	Brazil	10.09	
2nd place, silver medalist(s)	5	Chederick van Wyk	South Africa	10.23	
3rd place, bronze medalist(s)	4	Rodrigo do Nascimento	Brazil	10.32	
4	1	Ján Volko	Slovakia	10.36	
5	3	Duan Asemota	Canada	10.39	
6	7	Dominik Záleský	Czech Republic	10.42	
7	8	Daisuke Miyamoto	Japan	10.43	
	2	Carlos Nascimento	Portugal	DNS	
