= Emmanuel Yeboah =

Emmanuel Yeboah may refer to:

- Emmanuel Yeboah (cyclist), Ghanaian cyclist, triathlete, and disability rights activist
- Emmanuel Yeboah (sprinter), Ghanaian sprinter
- Emmanuel Yeboah (footballer), Ghanaian footballer
