= Athletics at the 2020 Summer Olympics – Men's 4 × 100 metres relay =

Men's 4 × 100 metres relay at the Games of the XXXII Olympiad
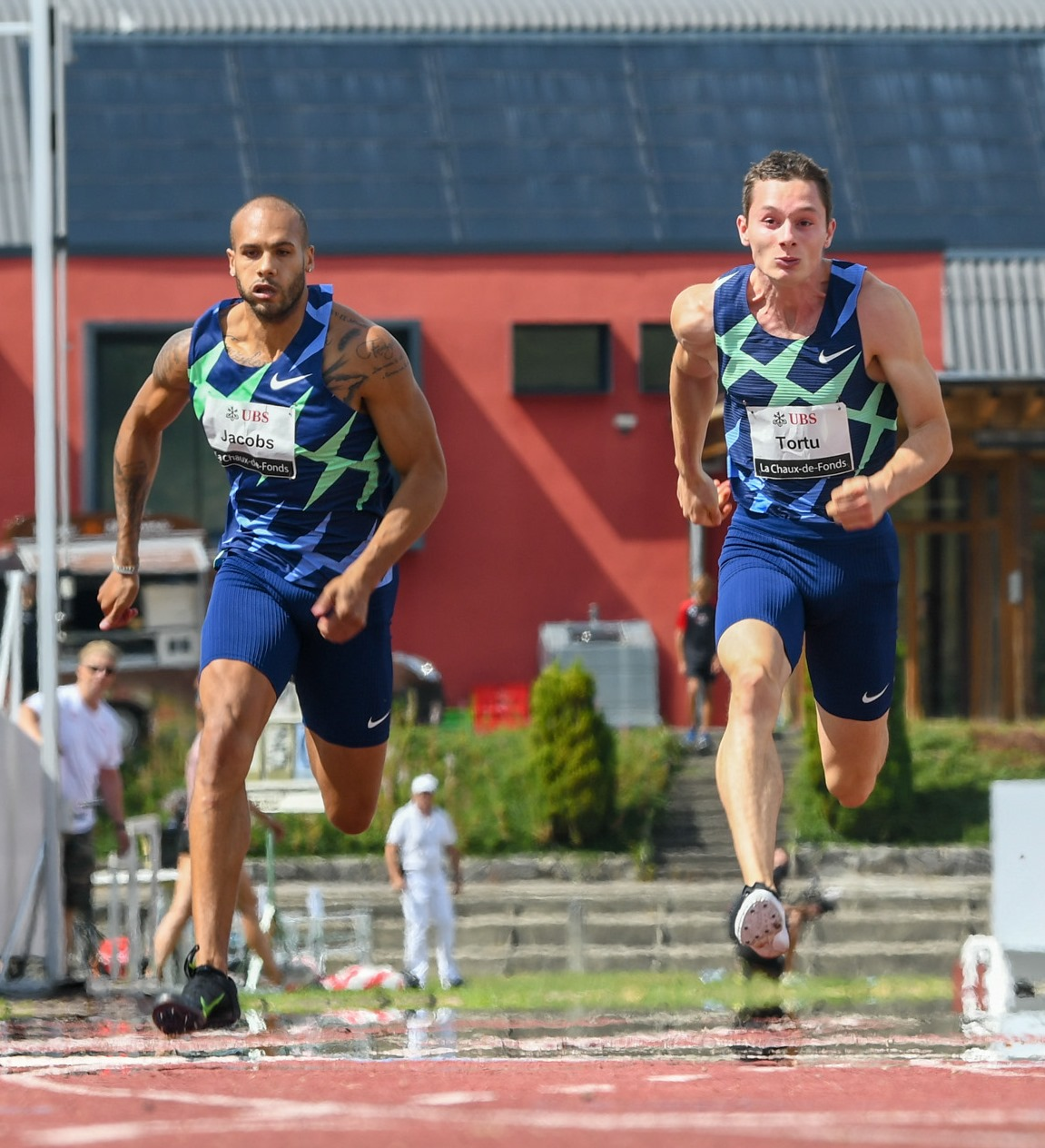
- Marcell Jacobs and Filippo Tortu, two members of the Italian national track relay team, gold medal winner.
- Venue: Olympic Stadium
- Dates: 5 August 2021 (round 1); 6 August 2021 (final)
- Competitors: 64 from 16 nations
- Winning time: 37.50

Medalists
1st place, gold medalist(s)		Lorenzo Patta; Marcell Jacobs; Fausto Desalu; Filippo Tortu	Italy
2nd place, silver medalist(s)		Aaron Brown; Jerome Blake; Brendon Rodney; Andre De Grasse	Canada
3rd place, bronze medalist(s)		Tang Xingqiang; Xie Zhenye; Su Bingtian; Wu Zhiqiang	China

The men's 4 × 100 metres relay event at the 2020 Summer Olympics took place on 5 and 6 August 2021 at the Olympic Stadium. There were 16 competing relay teams, with each team having 5 members from which 4 were selected in each round.

== Summary ==
During the final, Chijindu Ujah gave Great Britain the lead out of the blocks, Japan's Shuhei Tada and Canada's Aaron Brown also gaining relative to the stagger. At the first handoff, Ujah passed efficiently to Zharnel Hughes, pulling away from Jamaica to their inside. On the outside, Ryota Yamagata left too early for Tada to catch him inside the zone, Japan unable to make the handoff and ending their race. Down the backstretch, 2020 Olympic 100 metres champion Marcell Jacobs received the baton from Lorenzo Patta and opened up space on Xie Zhenye to his inside, pulling Italy into contention, with Canada's pass from Jerome Blake to Brendon Rodney keeping them in the mix. China loaded up their third leg with ace Su Bingtian pulling back some ground on GBR's Richard Kilty, while Jamaica had Yohan Blake, the second fastest man in history, running the bend. Kilty passed efficiently to Nethaneel Mitchell-Blake, while Wu Zhiqiang had to slow down and look back to find Su with the baton, costing China the chance to battle for gold. Italy passed from Fausto Desalu to Filippo Tortu about metre down from team GB. Behind China, Jamaica and Germany, Rodney passed to Canada's star Andre De Grasse almost 5 metres behind. From there De Grasse took off, passing three teams to move into third place, while over the final 50 metres Tortu produced a burst of speed combined with a perfectly executed final dip to take gold on the line. Italy had set a new national record with a time of 37.50, the 19th fastest performance ever and the 2021 world lead. China equalled their national record with 37.79, while Ghana was disqualified from 7th place because of a faulty baton pass.

During the Olympics, British athlete CJ Ujah tested positive for anabolic agent ostarine and steroid-like S-23 (drug), and was provisionally suspended, confirmed on 14 September by B-sample. On 18 February 2022, the British team was disqualified and officially stripped of the silver medal. The International Olympic Committee requested all members of Great Britain's relay team to return their medals. Canada's relay team was upgraded to silver, and China's relay team was upgraded to bronze. The medal reallocation ceremony of the bronze medal was held at the Hangzhou Olympic Sports Centre Stadium on 4 October 2023 after all the events of the Asian Games ended on that day, along with the medal reallocation ceremony of women's 20 km walk of London 2012.

== Background ==
This was the 25th 4 x 100 relay; it has been run every Olympics since 1912.

== Qualification ==
National Olympic Committees (NOCs) could qualify one relay team in one of three following ways:

- The top 8 NOCs at the 2019 World Athletics Championships qualified a relay team.
- The top 8 NOCs at the 2021 World Athletics Relays qualified a relay team.
- Where an NOC placed in the top 8 at both the 2019 World Championships and the 2021 World Relays, the quota place was allocated to the world top list as of 29 June 2021. In this case, 4 teams did so, so there are 4 places available through the world rankings.

A total of five athletes may be entered for a relay team. Should a NOC have also entered individual athletes in the corresponding individual event (100 m), the entered individual athletes must be included in the total of five (5) athletes entered for the relay event. In addition of five, NOCs can nominate a maximum of one alternate athlete for each team.

The qualifying period was originally from 1 May 2019 to 29 June 2020. Due to the COVID-19 pandemic, the period was suspended from 6 April 2020 to 30 November 2020, with the end date extended to 29 June 2021. The qualifying time standards could be obtained in various meets during the given period that have the approval of the IAAF. Both indoor and outdoor meets are eligible. The most recent Area Championships may be counted in the ranking, even if not during the qualifying period.

=== Qualified teams ===
A total of 16 NOCs qualified. Entry number: 16 teams of 5 athletes each (80), plus alternates.

Qualification standard	No. of teams	Qualified teams
2019 World Championships in Athletics; Finalists	8	Brazil; China; France; Great Britain; Japan; Netherlands; South Africa; United States
2021 World Athletics Relays; Further finalists	4	Denmark; Germany; Ghana; Italy
World Athletics Top List (as of 29 June 2021)	4	Canada; Jamaica; Trinidad and Tobago; Turkey

== Top list before competition ==
Source: 4x100 Metres Relay - men - senior - outdoor - 2021

1. 38.27 Great Britain, 1st in Gateshead (GBR), on 13 July 2021
2. 38.29 China, 1st in Shenzhen (CHN), on 20 March 2021
3. 38.29 Canada, 2nd in Gateshead, on 13 July 2021
4. 38.32 Germany, 1st at Sportanlage am Weinweg, Regensburg (GER) 20 June 2021
5. 38.33 Jamaica, 1st at GC Foster College, Spanish Town (JAM) 8 May 2021
6. 38.45 Brazil, 1h2 at Stadion Śląski, Chorzów (POL) 1 May 2021
7. 38.45 Italy, 1h3 at Stadion Śląski, Chorzów (POL) 1 May 2021
8. ~~38.49 South Africa, 2h3 at Stadion Śląski, Chorzów (POL) 1 May 2021~~ (DQ)
9. 38.53 Nigeria, 1st at Yabatech Sport Complex, Lagos (NGR) 27 June 2021, first non-qualifier
10. 38.56 Netherlands, 1st at Centre sportif du Bout-du-Monde, Genève (SUI) 12 June 2021
11. 38.60 Florida State Seminoles ( United States), 3rd at Hayward Field, Eugene (USA) 11 June 2021

Season's bests for the other qualified teams:

1. 38.79 Ghana, 2h1 at Stadion Śląski, Chorzów (POL), on 1 May 2021
2. 38.94 Turkey, 2f1 in Cluj-Napoca (ROU), on 19 June 2021
3. 38.98 Japan, 3h2 at Stadion Śląski, Chorzów (POL), on 1 May 2021
4. 39.06 Denmark, 4h2 at Stadion Śląski, Chorzów (POL), on 1 May 2021
5. 39.08 France, 3h3 at Stadion Śląski, Chorzów (POL), on 1 May 2021
6. 39.63 Trinidad and Tobago, 2nd at The Bahamas National Stadium, Nassau (BAH) 28 June 2021

== Competition format ==
The event continued to use the two-round format introduced in 2012.

== Records ==
Prior to this competition, the existing world, Olympic, and area records were as follows.

World record	Nesta Carter, Michael Frater, Yohan Blake, Usain Bolt (JAM)	36.84	London, United Kingdom	11 August 2012
Olympic record	Nesta Carter, Michael Frater, Yohan Blake, Usain Bolt (JAM)	36.84	London, United Kingdom	11 August 2012

Area	Time (s)	Athlete	Nation
Africa (records)	37.65	Thando Dlodlo; Simon Magakwe; Clarence Munyai; Akani Simbine	South Africa
Asia (records)	37.43	Shuhei Tada; Kirara Shiraishi; Yoshihide Kiryū; Abdul Hakim Sani Brown	Japan
Europe (records)	37.36	Adam Gemili; Zharnel Hughes; Richard Kilty; Nethaneel Mitchell-Blake	Great Britain
North, Central America and Caribbean (records)	36.84 WR	Nesta Carter; Michael Frater; Yohan Blake; Usain Bolt	Jamaica
Oceania (records)	38.17	Paul Henderson; Tim Jackson; Steve Brimacombe; Damien Marsh	Australia
Oceania (records)	38.17	Anthony Alozie; Isaac Ntiamoah; Andrew McCabe; Joshua Ross	Australia
South America (records)	37.72	Rodrigo do Nascimento; Vitor Hugo dos Santos; Derick Silva; Paulo André de Oliveira	Brazil

The following national records were established during the competition:

Country	Athlete	Round	Time	Notes
Italy	Lorenzo Patta, Marcell Jacobs, Fausto Desalu, Filippo Tortu	Heats	37.95	
Italy	Lorenzo Patta, Marcell Jacobs, Fausto Desalu, Filippo Tortu	Final	37.50	WL
Ghana	Sean Safo-Antwi, Benjamin Azamati-Kwaku, Emmanuel Yeboah, Joseph Amoah	Heats	38.08	
Denmark	Simon Hansen, Tazana Kamanga-Dyrbak, Kojo Musah, Frederik Schou-Nielsen	Heats	38.16	
China	Tang Xingqiang, Xie Zhenye, Su Bingtian, Wu Zhiqiang	Final	37.79	=NR

== Schedule ==
All times are Japan Standard Time (UTC+9)

The men's 4 × 100 metres relay took place over two consecutive days.

Date	Time	Round
Thursday, 5 August 2021	11:30	Heats
Friday, 6 August 2021	22:50	Final

== Results ==
Results are from World Athletics:

=== Heats ===
Qualification Rules: First 3 in each heat (Q) and the next 2 fastest (q) advance to the Final

==== Heat 1 ====
Rank	Lane	Nation	Competitors	Reaction	Time	Notes
1	5	Jamaica	Jevaughn Minzie, Julian Forte, Yohan Blake, Oblique Seville	.146	37.82	Q, WL
2	4	Japan	Shuhei Tada, Ryota Yamagata, Yoshihide Kiryū, Yuki Koike	.147	38.16	Q, SB
3	9	France	Mouhamadou Fall, Jimmy Vicaut, Méba-Mickaël Zeze, Ryan Zeze	.156	38.18	SB
4	2	Brazil	Rodrigo do Nascimento, Felipe Bardi dos Santos, Derick Silva, Paulo André de Oliveira	.140	38.34	SB
5	8	Trinidad and Tobago	Kion Benjamin, Eric Harrison Jr., Akanni Hislop, Richard Thompson	.150	38.63	SB
–	6	Netherlands	Joris van Gool, Taymir Burnet, Chris Garia, Churandy Martina	.146		DNF
–	7	South Africa	Clarence Munyai, Shaun Maswanganyi, Chederick van Wyk, Akani Simbine	.150		DNF
–	3	Great Britain	CJ Ujah, Zharnel Hughes, Richard Kilty, Nethaneel Mitchell-Blake	.152	DQ (38.02)	R 41.1

==== Heat 2 ====
Rank	Lane	Nation	Competitors	Reaction	Time	Notes
1	4	China	Tang Xingqiang, Xie Zhenye, Su Bingtian, Wu Zhiqiang	.152	37.92 (37.916)	Q, SB
2	9	Canada	Aaron Brown, Jerome Blake, Brendon Rodney, Andre De Grasse	.177	37.92 (37.918)	Q, SB
3	5	Italy	Lorenzo Patta, Marcell Jacobs, Fausto Desalu, Filippo Tortu	.170	37.95	Q, NR
4	6	Germany	Julian Reus, Joshua Hartmann, Deniz Almas, Lucas Ansah-Peprah	.134	38.06	q, SB
5	8	Ghana	Sean Safo-Antwi, Benjamin Azamati-Kwaku, Emmanuel Yeboah, Joseph Amoah	.137	38.08	q, NR
6	3	United States	Trayvon Bromell, Fred Kerley, Ronnie Baker, Cravon Gillespie	.148	38.10	SB
7	7	Denmark	Simon Hansen, Tazana Kamanga-Dyrbak, Kojo Musah, Frederik Schou-Nielsen	.143	38.16	NR
–	2	Turkey	Ertan Özkan, Jak Ali Harvey, Kayhan Özer, Ramil Guliyev	.146		DQ

=== Final ===
Rank	Lane	Nation	Competitors	Reaction	Time	Notes
1st place, gold medalist(s)	8	Italy	Lorenzo Patta, Marcell Jacobs, Fausto Desalu, Filippo Tortu	0.154	37.50	WL, NR
2nd place, silver medalist(s)	4	Canada	Aaron Brown, Jerome Blake, Brendon Rodney, Andre De Grasse	0.148	37.70	SB
3rd place, bronze medalist(s)	7	China	Tang Xingqiang, Xie Zhenye, Su Bingtian, Wu Zhiqiang	0.153	37.79	=NR
4	5	Jamaica	Jevaughn Minzie, Julian Forte, Yohan Blake, Oblique Seville	0.158	37.84	
5	3	Germany	Julian Reus, Joshua Hartmann, Deniz Almas, Lucas Ansah-Peprah	0.136	38.12	
–	9	Japan	Shuhei Tada, Ryota Yamagata, Yoshihide Kiryū, Yuki Koike	0.139		DNF
–	2	Ghana	Sean Safo-Antwi, Benjamin Azamati-Kwaku, Emmanuel Yeboah, Joseph Amoah	0.160	DQ	R 170.7
DQ	6	Great Britain	CJ Ujah, Zharnel Hughes, Richard Kilty, Nethaneel Mitchell-Blake	0.141	DQ (37.51)	R 41.1
