= 2023 World Athletics Championships – Men's 4 × 100 metres relay =

Men's 4 × 100 metres relay at the 2023 World Championships
- Venue: National Athletics Centre
- Dates: 25 August (heats); 26 August (final)
- Winning time: 37.38

Medalists
gold medal	Christian Coleman; Fred Kerley; Brandon Carnes; Noah Lyles	United States
silver medal	Roberto Rigali; Lamont Marcell Jacobs; Lorenzo Patta; Filippo Tortu	Italy
bronze medal	Ackeem Blake; Oblique Seville; Ryiem Forde; Rohan Watson	Jamaica

The men's 4 × 100 metres relay at the 2023 World Athletics Championships was held at the National Athletics Centre in Budapest on 25 and 26 August 2023. It was the 19th edition of this relay at the World Athletics Championships since 1983.

== Summary ==
After procedure modifications, the fastest qualifiers were assigned outside lanes, thus more favorable, wider turns. With one of the fastest starters in history, 2019 100m champion Christian Coleman out of the blocks, USA was making up the stagger on Japan, the only team to its outside. A couple of lanes inside, Jamaica's Ackeem Blake was gaining on South Africa between them. USA clearly passed first to 2022 100m champion Fred Kerley, Jamaica passed late in the zone to Oblique Seville but the same time as GBR passed to Zharnel Hughes. USA made the second pass from Kerley to Brandon Carnes ahead, but they were slowed by two attempts to transfer the baton. Jamaica to Ryiem Forde and GBR to Adam Gemili passed about even, and Italy's quick pass from Olympic Champion Marcell Jacobs to Lorenzo Patta put them into contention. Through the turn, Jamaica and Italy gained ground. Jamaica passed to their surprise National Champion Rohan Watson less than a metre behind USA. But USA had the double sprint winner Noah Lyles on anchor. Lyles opened up a 4 metre gap on his leg for a clear American victory. Italy passed to Filippo Tortu a metre down to Jamaica, but Tortu reversed that and gained a couple of metres for a clear second. Watson was able to hold off GBR's Eugene Amo-Dadzie and Japan's fast closing Abdul Hakim Sani Brown to retain bronze. It was Jamaica's first 4x100 medal since the retirement of Usain Bolt. Upon crossing the finish line, Lyles held up 3 fingers for the cameras to celebrate his third gold medal at these championships.

== Records ==
Before the competition, records were as follows:

Record	Athlete & Nat.	Perf.	Location	Date
World record	Jamaica; Nesta Carter, Michael Frater, Yohan Blake, Usain Bolt	36.84	London, United Kingdom	11 August 2012
Championships record	Jamaica; Nesta Carter, Michael Frater, Yohan Blake, Usain Bolt	37.04	Daegu, South Korea	4 September 2011
World Leading	Canada; Aaron Brown, Jerome Blake, Brendon Rodney, Andre De Grasse	37.80	Gainesville, Florida, United States	1 April 2023
African Record	South Africa; Thando Dlodlo, Simon Magakwe, Clarence Munyai, Akani Simbine	37.65	Doha, Qatar	4 October 2019
Asian Record	Japan; Shuhei Tada, Kirara Shiraishi, Yoshihide Kiryu, Abdul Hakim Sani Brown	37.43	Doha, Qatar	5 October 2019
North, Central American and Caribbean record	Jamaica; Nesta Carter, Michael Frater, Yohan Blake, Usain Bolt	36.84	London, United Kingdom	11 August 2012
South American Record	Brazil; Rodrigo do Nascimento, Vitor Hugo dos Santos, Derick Silva, Paulo André Camilo	37.72	Doha, Qatar	5 October 2019
European Record	Great Britain; Adam Gemili, Zharnel Hughes, Richard Kilty, Nethaneel Mitchell-Blake	37.37	Doha, Qatar	5 October 2019
Oceanian record	Australia; Paul Henderson, Tim Jackson, Steve Brimacombe, Damien Marsh	38.17	Gothenburg, Sweden	12 August 1995
Oceanian record	Australia; Anthony Alozie, Isaac Ntiamoah, Andrew McCabe, Josh Ross	38.17	London, United Kingdom	10 August 2012

== Qualification system ==
After the postponement for COVID-19 pandemic reasons of the 2023 World Relays to 2024 Nassau, the modified system to qualify automatically is to have finished in the first eight (finalists) at 2022 World Championships, in Eugene, completed by eight more 2022-2023 top lists' teams.

=== Participating teams ===
- Canada (1st)
- United States (2nd)
- Great Britain (3rd)
- Jamaica (4th)
- Ghana (5th)
- South Africa (6th)
- Brazil (7th)
- France (–, DQ)

Top list before the 30 July 2023:

=== 2022 Top list ===
The qualification period has started on 31 July 2022 and closes on 30 July 2023. Here are the marks made before the starting of the qualification period.

1. 37.99 Germany 1f1 NR Universitätsstadion am Biopark, Regensburg (GER) 3 June 2022
2. 38.09 Adidas team (USA) 1f1 Percy Beard Track, Gainesville, FL (USA) 16 April 2022
3. 38.31 Canada 1 Alexander Stadium, Birmingham (GBR) 21 May 2022
4. 38.35 Nigeria 1 Samuel Ogbemudia Stadium, Benin City (NGR) 25 June 2022
5. 38.41 France 2 Alexander Stadium, Birmingham (GBR) 21 May 2022
6. 38.43 Great Britain 1 Mestský Stadion, Ostrava (CZE) 31 May 2022
7. 38.56 Thailand 1 NR Yecheon (KOR) 4 June 2022
8. 38.63 South Africa 1 National Stadium, Gaborone (BOT) 30 April 2022
9. 38.70 Netherlands 1 Olympiastadion, Stockholm (SWE) 30 June 2022
10. 38.72 United States 1f3 Hilmer Lodge Stadium, Walnut, CA (USA) 16 April 2022
11. 38.76 Liberia 1 Hasely Crawford Stadium, Port-of-Spain (TTO) 26 June 2022
12. 38.89 Racers Track Club (JAM) 1f1 National Stadium, Kingston (JAM) 26 February 2022
13. 38.89 Czech Republic 2f1 Centre sportif du Bout-du-Monde, Geneva (SUI) 11 June 2022
14. 38.90 SESI - SP (BRA) 1f3 Rio de Janeiro (BRA) 23 June 2022
15. 38.95 Italy 1 Stade Complexe Olympique, Oran (ALG) 1 July 2022
16. 38.97 Spain 1 Estadio Iberoamericano, Huelva (ESP) 25 May 2022
17. 38.98 Turkey 2 Stade Complexe Olympique, Oran (ALG) 1 July 2022

=== 2022 Qualification period top list ===
The qualification period has started on 31 July 2022 and closes on 30 July 2023.

1. 37.67Q Great Britain 1 Olympiastadion, Munich (GER) 21 August 2022
2. 37.94Q France 2 Olympiastadion, Munich (GER) 21 August 2022
3. 37.97 NR Germany 1h2 Olympiastadion, Munich (GER) 19 August 2022
4. 38.15 NR Poland 3 Olympiastadion, Munich (GER) 21 August 2022
5. 38.25 Netherlands 4 Olympiastadion, Munich (GER) 21 August 2022
6. 38.36 NR Switzerland 5 Olympiastadion, Munich (GER) 21 August 2022
7. 38.70 Trinidad and Tobago 2 Alexander Stadium, Birmingham (GBR) 7 August 2022

=== 2023 Top List ===
(updated on 6 June 2023)

1. 37.80Q Canada 1 Percy Beard Track, Gainesville, FL (USA) 1 April 2023
2. 37.93Q "Florida" (USA) 2f2 LSU Bernie Moore Stadium, Baton Rouge, LA (USA) 13 May 2023
3. 38.26 NR Kenya 1 National Stadium, Gaborone (BOT) 29 April 2023
4. 38.38 Italy 1 Stadio Luigi Ridolfi, Florence (ITA) 7 May 2023
5. 38.50 Australia 1 SOPAC, Sydney (AUS) 11 March 2023
6. 38.61Q "Empire Athletics" (JAM) 3 Percy Beard Track, Gainesville, FL (USA) 1 April 2023
7. 38.79 Germany 1f1 Universitätsstadion am Biopark, Regensburg (GER) 3 June 2023
8. 38.83Q France 1f1 Roy P. Drachman Stadium, Tucson, AZ (USA) 29 April 2023
9. 38.97 Fujian (CHN) 1 Zhaoqing Sports Center, Zhaoqing (CHN) 23 April 2023
10. 39.04 Colombia 2f2 Estadio Iberoamericano, Huelva (ESP) 6 June 2023
11. 39.10 Dominican Republic 1 La Vicentina, Quito (ECU) 4 March 2023
12. 39.11 Indonesia 1 Morodok Techo National Stadium, Phnom Penh (CAM) 10 May 2023
13. 39.12Q Netherlands 1 Fanny Blankers-Koen Stadion, Hengelo (NED) 4 June 2023

Next best 2022–23

(teams not qualified):

- Belgium 38.73 NR - Olympiastadion, Munich (GER) - 19 August 2022
- Turkey 38.74 - Athletics Stadium, Konya (TUR) - 12 August 2022
- Nigeria 38.81 - Alexander Stadium, Birmingham (GBR) - 07 August 2022
- Czech Republic 38.93 - Stadion Śląski, Chorzów (POL) - 4 June 2023

== Results ==
=== Heats ===
The first three in each heat (Q) and the next two fastest (q) qualified for the final.

Rank	Heat	Nation	Athletes	Time	Notes
1	2	Italy	Roberto Rigali, Marcell Jacobs, Lorenzo Patta, Filippo Tortu	37.65	Q, WL
2	1	United States	Christian Coleman, Fred Kerley, Brandon Carnes, J.T. Smith	37.67	Q
3	1	Jamaica	Ackeem Blake, Oblique Seville, Ryiem Forde, Rohan Watson	37.68	Q, SB
4	1	Japan	Ryuichiro Sakai, Hiroki Yanagita, Yuki Koike, Abdul Hakim Sani Brown	37.71	Q, SB
5	2	South Africa	Shaun Maswanganyi, Benjamin Richardson, Clarence Munyai, Akani Simbine	37.72	Q, SB
6	1	France	Méba-Mickaël Zeze, Pablo Matéo, Ryan Zeze, Mouhamadou Fall	37.98	q, SB
7	2	Great Britain & N.I.	Jeremiah Azu, Adam Gemili, Jona Efoloko, Eugene Amo-Dadzie	38.01	Q
8	2	Brazil	Paulo André Camilo, Felipe Bardi, Erik Cardoso, Rodrigo do Nascimento	38.19	q, SB
9	2	Nigeria	Favour Ashe, Usheoritse Itsekiri, Alaba Akintola, Seye Ogunlewe	38.20	SB
10	2	Canada	Aaron Brown, Jerome Blake, Brendon Rodney, Bolade Ajomale	38.25	
11	2	Switzerland	Pascal Mancini, Bradley Lestrade, Felix Svensson, Enrico Güntert	38.65	
12	1	Trinidad and Tobago	Omari Lewis, Jerod Elcock, Revell Webster, Devin Augustine	38.89	
13	1	Hungary	Dominik Illovszky, Bence Boros, Dániel Szabò, Márk Pap	39.55	SB
–	1	Netherlands	Nsikak Ekpo, Taymir Burnet, Hensley Paulina, Raphael Bouju	DNF	
–	1	Germany	Kevin Kranz, Lucas Ansah-Peprah, Joshua Hartmann, Yannick Wolf	DNF	
–	2	Poland	Adam Burda, Mateusz Siuda, Łukasz Żak, Dominik Kopeć	DNF	

=== Final ===
The final was started on 26 August at 21:42.

Rank	Lane	Nation	Athletes	Time	Notes
1st place, gold medalist(s)	8	United States	Christian Coleman, Fred Kerley, Brandon Carnes, Noah Lyles	37.38	WL
2nd place, silver medalist(s)	5	Italy	Roberto Rigali, Marcell Jacobs, Lorenzo Patta, Filippo Tortu	37.62	SB
3rd place, bronze medalist(s)	6	Jamaica	Ackeem Blake, Oblique Seville, Ryiem Forde, Rohan Watson	37.76	
4	4	Great Britain & N.I.	Jeremiah Azu, Zharnel Hughes, Adam Gemili, Eugene Amo-Dadzie	37.80	SB
5	9	Japan	Ryuichiro Sakai, Hiroki Yanagita, Yuki Koike, Abdul Hakim Sani Brown	37.83	
6	3	France	Méba-Mickaël Zeze, Pablo Matéo, Ryan Zeze, Mouhamadou Fall	38.06	
	7	South Africa	Shaun Maswanganyi, Benjamin Richardson, Clarence Munyai, Akani Simbine	DNF	
	2	Brazil	Rodrigo do Nascimento, Jorge Vides, Erik Cardoso, Felipe Bardi	DQ	TR24.7
