= 2019 IAAF World Relays – Men's 4 × 200 metres relay =

Men's 4 × 200 metres relay at the 2019 IAAF World Relays
- Venue: Nissan Stadium
- Dates: 12 May (heats & final)
- Nations: 13
- Winning time: 1:20.12

Medalists
gold medal	Christopher Belcher; Bryce Robinson; Vernon Norwood; Remontay McClain	United States
silver medal	Simon Magakwe; Chederick van Wyk; Sinesipho Dambile; Akani Simbine; Jon Seeliger*; Anaso Jobodwana*	South Africa
bronze medal	Maurice Huke; Patrick Domogala; Aleixo-Platini Menga; Robin Erewa	Germany

The men's 4 × 200 metres relay at the 2019 IAAF World Relays was held at the Nissan Stadium on 12 May.

== Records ==
Prior to the competition, the records were as follows:

World record	Jamaica (Nickel Ashmeade, Warren Weir, Jermaine Brown, Yohan Blake)	1:18.63	(The Bahamas) Nassau, Bahamas	24 May 2014
Championship record	Jamaica (Nickel Ashmeade, Warren Weir, Jermaine Brown, Yohan Blake)	1:18.63	(The Bahamas) Nassau, Bahamas	24 May 2014
World Leading	Canada	1:20.17	Gainesville, United States	30 March 2019

== Results ==
KEY:	Q	Qualified	q	Fastest non-qualifiers	WL	World leading	CR	Championship record	NR	National record	SB	Seasonal best

=== Heats ===
Qualification: First 3 of each heat (Q) plus the 2 fastest times (q) advanced to the final.

Rank	Heat	Nation	Athletes	Time	Notes
1	1	United States	Christopher Belcher, Bryce Robinson, Vernon Norwood, Remontay McClain	1:19.73	Q, WL
2	2	South Africa	Jon Seeliger, Anaso Jobodwana, Sinesipho Dambile, Chederick van Wyk	1:20.64	Q, AR
3	2	Germany	Maurice Huke, Patrick Domogala, Aleixo-Platini Menga, Robin Erewa	1:21.63	Q, SB
4	2	China	Mo Youxue, Luo Wenyi, Bie Ge, Lin Junhong	1:21.70	Q, AR
5	2	Nigeria	Jerry Jakpa, Enoch Adegoke, Ogho-Oghene Egwero, Emmanuel Arowolo	1:22.08	q, NR
6	1	Bahamas	Cliff Resias, Stephen Newbold, Anthony Adderley, Shavez Hart	1:22.40	Q, SB
7	1	Kenya	Mark Otieno Odhiambo, Mike Mokamba, Samuel Chege Waweru, Alphas Leken Kishoyian	1:22.56	Q, SB
8	2	Japan	Daisuke Miyamoto, Kirara Shiraishi, Tomoya Tamura, Kenji Fujimitsu	1:23.15	q, SB
9	1	Papua New Guinea	Emmanuel Wanga, Nazmie-lee Marai, Shadrick Tansi, Daniel Baul	1:26.96	NR
10	1	Ecuador	Carlos Perlaza, Jhon Valencia, Álex Quiñónez, David Cetre	1:27.22	NR
	2	Brazil	Vítor Hugo dos Santos, Jorge Vides, Derick Silva, Paulo André de Oliveira	DNF	
	1	France	Marvin René, Gautier Dautremer, Ryan Zeze, Amaury Golitin	DQ	R170.7
	1	Jamaica	Chadic Hinds, Nigel Ellis, Oshane Bailey, Jevaughn Minzie	DQ	R163.3(a)

=== Final ===
Rank	Lane	Nation	Athletes	Time	Notes	Points
1st place, gold medalist(s)	4	United States	Christopher Belcher, Bryce Robinson, Vernon Norwood, Remontay McClain	1:20.12		8
2nd place, silver medalist(s)	6	South Africa	Simon Magakwe, Chederick van Wyk, Sinesipho Dambile, Akani Simbine	1:20.42	AR	7
3rd place, bronze medalist(s)	7	Germany	Maurice Huke, Patrick Domogala, Aleixo-Platini Menga, Robin Erewa	1:21.26	NR	6
4	9	Kenya	Mark Otieno Odhiambo, Mike Mokamba, Samuel Chege Waweru, Alphas Leken Kishoyian	1:22.55	SB	5
5	3	Japan	Daisuke Miyamoto, Shunto Nagata, Tomoya Tamura, Kenji Fujimitsu	1:22.67	SB	4
6	8	China	Mo Youxue, Luo Wenyi, Bie Ge, Lin Junhong	1:22.67	SB	3
	5	Bahamas	Cliff Resias, Stephen Newbold, Anthony Adderley, Rico Moultrie	DQ	R170.6(c)	0
	2	Nigeria	Emmanuel Arowolo, Enoch Adegoke/Usheoritse Itsekiri, Jerry Jakpa	DQ	R163.3(a)	0
