= 2019 European Athletics U23 Championships – Men's decathlon =

The men's decathlon event at the 2019 European Athletics U23 Championships was held in Gävle, Sweden, at Gavlehof Stadium Park on 13 and 14 July.

== Results ==
The highest mark recorded in each event is highlighted in yellow

| Rank | Athlete | Nationality | 100m | LJ | SP | HJ | 400m | 110m H | DT | PV | JT | 1500m | Points | Notes |
|---|---|---|---|---|---|---|---|---|---|---|---|---|---|---|
| 1st place, gold medalist(s) | Niklas Kaul | Germany | 11.17 | 7.26 | 15.19 | 2.03 | 48.67 | 14.83 | 47.35 | 4.80 | 77.36 | 4:17.63 | 8572 | CR, PB |
| 2nd place, silver medalist(s) | Johannes Erm | Estonia | 10.73 | 7.97 | 14.66 | 2.03 | 47.41 | 14.33 | 43.24 | 4.70 | 59.60 | 4:34.04 | 8445 | NU23R |
| 3rd place, bronze medalist(s) | Manuel Eitel | Germany | 10.42 | 7.13 | 14.43 | 1.97 | 48.34 | 14.48 | 41.36 | 4.70 | 60.17 | 4:46.53 | 8067 | |
| 4 | Rody de Wolff | Netherlands | 11.04 | 7.32 | 14.13 | 1.97 | 49.14 | 14.68 | 47.51 | 4.40 | 59.77 | 4:37.03 | 7982 | PB |
| 5 | Ludovic Besson | France | 10.86 | 7.26 | 14.65 | 2.00 | 51.18 | 14.96 | 41.54 | 4.70 | 56.53 | 4:47.01 | 7792 | PB |
| 6 | Rafael Raap | Netherlands | 10.94 | 6.99 | 13.68 | 2.00 | 49.29 | 15.03 | 44.34 | 4.50 | 53.52 | 4:54.20 | 7639 | |
| 7 | Jan Ruhrmann | Germany | 11.34 | 6.88 | 15.79 | 1.91 | 49.75 | 16.21 | 48.97 | 4.40 | 56.10 | 4:35.21 | 7637 | |
| 8 | Edgaras Benkunskas | Lithuania | 11.22 | 7.09 | 14.09 | 2.03 | 50.74 | 15.16 | 40.51 | 4.50 | 58.60 | 4:51.58 | 7584 | PB |
| 9 | Andreas Gustafsson | Sweden | 11.19 | 7.08 | 12.17 | 1.94 | 49.82 | 14.97 | 38.72 | 4.60 | 54.20 | 4:31.16 | 7511 | PB |
| 10 | Finley Gaio | Switzerland | 10.75 | 7.45 | 13.22 | 1.91 | 49.17 | 14.43 | 36.12 | 4.20 | 51.80 | 4:59.36 | 7453 | PB |
| 11 | Rafał Horbowicz | Poland | 11.43 | 6.78 | 14.39 | 2.00 | 51.79 | 14.99 | 40.38 | 4.40 | 50.16 | 4:49.14 | 7287 | |
| 12 | Aris-Nikolaos Peristeris | Greece | 11.46 | 6.79 | 12.54 | 1.97 | 52.73 | 16.17 | 43.88 | 4.00 | 65.93 | 4:52.16 | 7141 | |
| 13 | Rik Taam | Netherlands | 10.95 | 6.91 | 13.52 | 1.91 | 49.40 | 15.25 | 43.99 | NM | 58.87 | 4:33.18 | 6939 | |
| 14 | Makenson Gletty | France | 10.73 | 7.08 | NM | 1.97 | 51.26 | 14.64 | 45.60 | 4.70 | 41.02 | 4:52.26 | 6842 | |
| 15 | Leo Uusimäki | Finland | 11.08 | NM | 12.23 | 1.82 | 49.70 | 15.21 | 32.15 | 4.50 | 51.23 | 4:45.91 | 6277 | |
| | Jean-Baptiste Nutte | Belgium | 11.23 | 7.34 | 14.68 | 1.91 | DNS | – | – | – | – | – | DNF | |
| | Artem Makarenko | Authorised Neutral Athletes | 10.70 | 7.01 | 13.54 | 1.94 | DNS | – | – | – | – | – | DNF | |
| | Ondřej Kopecký | Czech Republic | 11.30 | NM | 12.76 | 1.91 | DNS | – | – | – | – | – | DNF | |
| | Trpimir Široki | Croatia | 11.13 | 7.63 | 12.87 | DNS | DNS | – | – | – | – | – | DNF | |
