= Marcus Lawler =

Irish sprinter

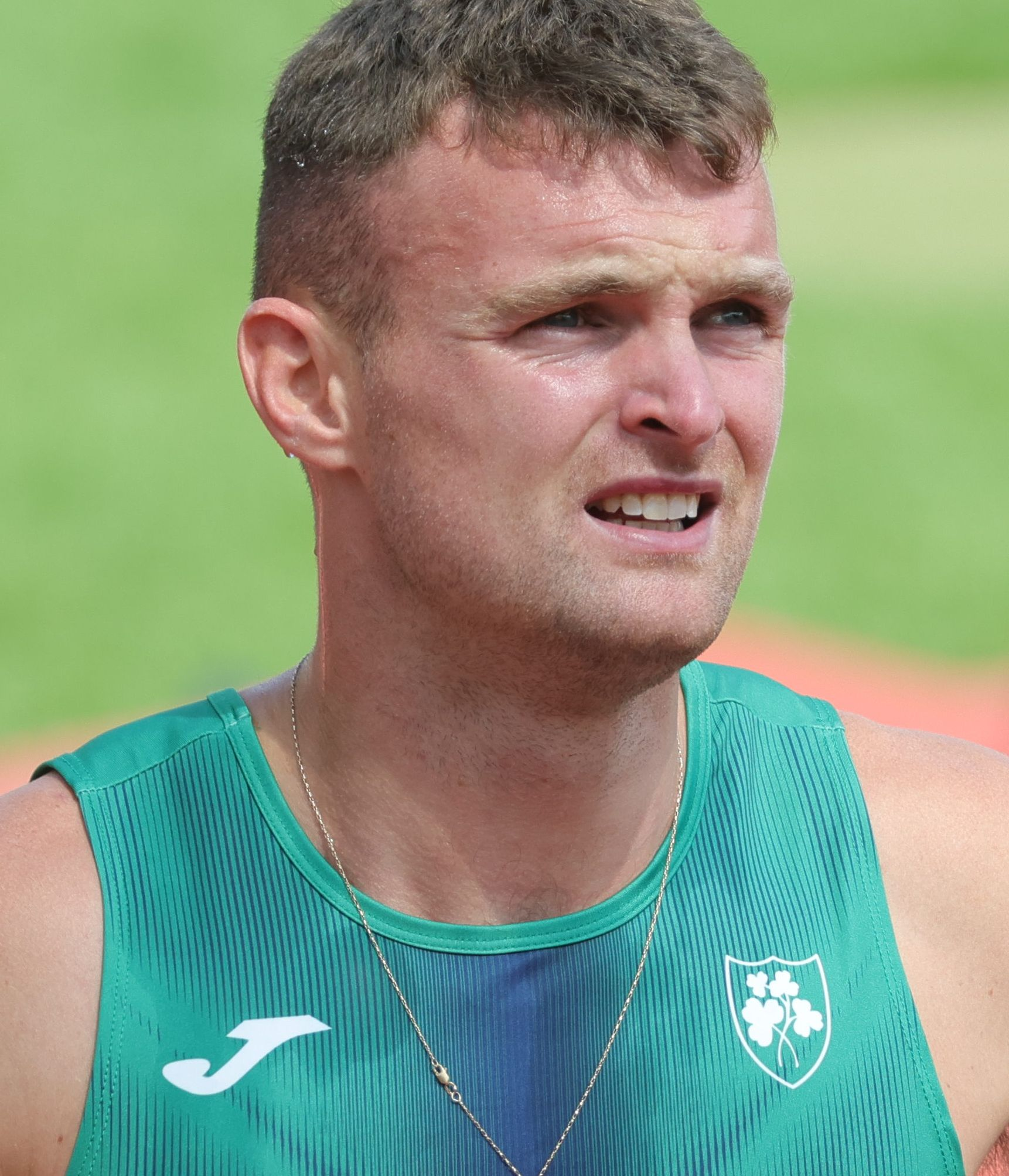
- Lawler in 2022

Personal information
- Born: 28 February 1995 (age 31)
- Education: Institute of Technology Carlow

Sport
- Sport: Athletics
- Event: 200 metres
- Club: IT Carlow

Marcus Lawler (born 28 February 1995) is an Irish sprinter specialising in the 200 metres. He finished fourth at the 2013 European Junior Championships and represented his country at two senior European Championships. He won the bronze medal at the 2019 Summer Universiade in the men's 200 metres event.

== International competitions ==
Year	Competition	Venue	Position	Event	Notes
Representing Ireland
2011	World Youth Championships	Lille, France	19th (sf)	200 m	21.81
2011	European Youth Olympic Festival	Trabzon, Turkey	5th	200 m	21.61
2011	European Youth Olympic Festival	Trabzon, Turkey	11th (h)	4 × 100 m relay	42.67
2012	World Junior Championships	Barcelona, Spain	37th (h)	200 m	21.58
2013	European Junior Championships	Rieti, Italy	4th	200 m	20.99
2014	World Junior Championships	Eugene, United States	40th (h)	200 m	21.58
2015	European U23 Championships	Tallinn, Estonia	7th	200 m	20.94
2015	European U23 Championships	Tallinn, Estonia	5th	4 × 100 m relay	39.89
2016	European Championships	Amsterdam, Netherlands	21st (sf)	200 m	21.33
2016	European Championships	Amsterdam, Netherlands	13th (h)	4 × 100 m relay	39.52
2017	Universiade	Taipei, Taiwan	23rd (qf)	100 m	10.70
2018	European Championships	Berlin, Germany	13th (h)	200 m	20.80
2019	Universiade	Naples, Italy	3rd	200 m	20.55
2021	Olympic Games	Tokyo, Japan	29th (h)	200 m	20.73
2022	European Championships	Munich, Germany	20th (h)	200 m	21.10
2026	European Championships	Birmingham, United Kingdom	23rd (sf)	200 m	21.11
2026	European Championships	Birmingham, United Kingdom	7th	4 × 100 m relay	40.26

== Personal bests ==
Outdoor

- 100 metres – 10.30 (+0.7 m/s, Regensburg 2017)
- 200 metres – 20.40 (+0.9 m/s, Cork 2018)

Indoor

- 60 metres – 6.78 (Athlone 2018)
- 200 metres – 20.96 (Athlone 2016)
