= Manuel Eitel =

German athlete (born 1997)

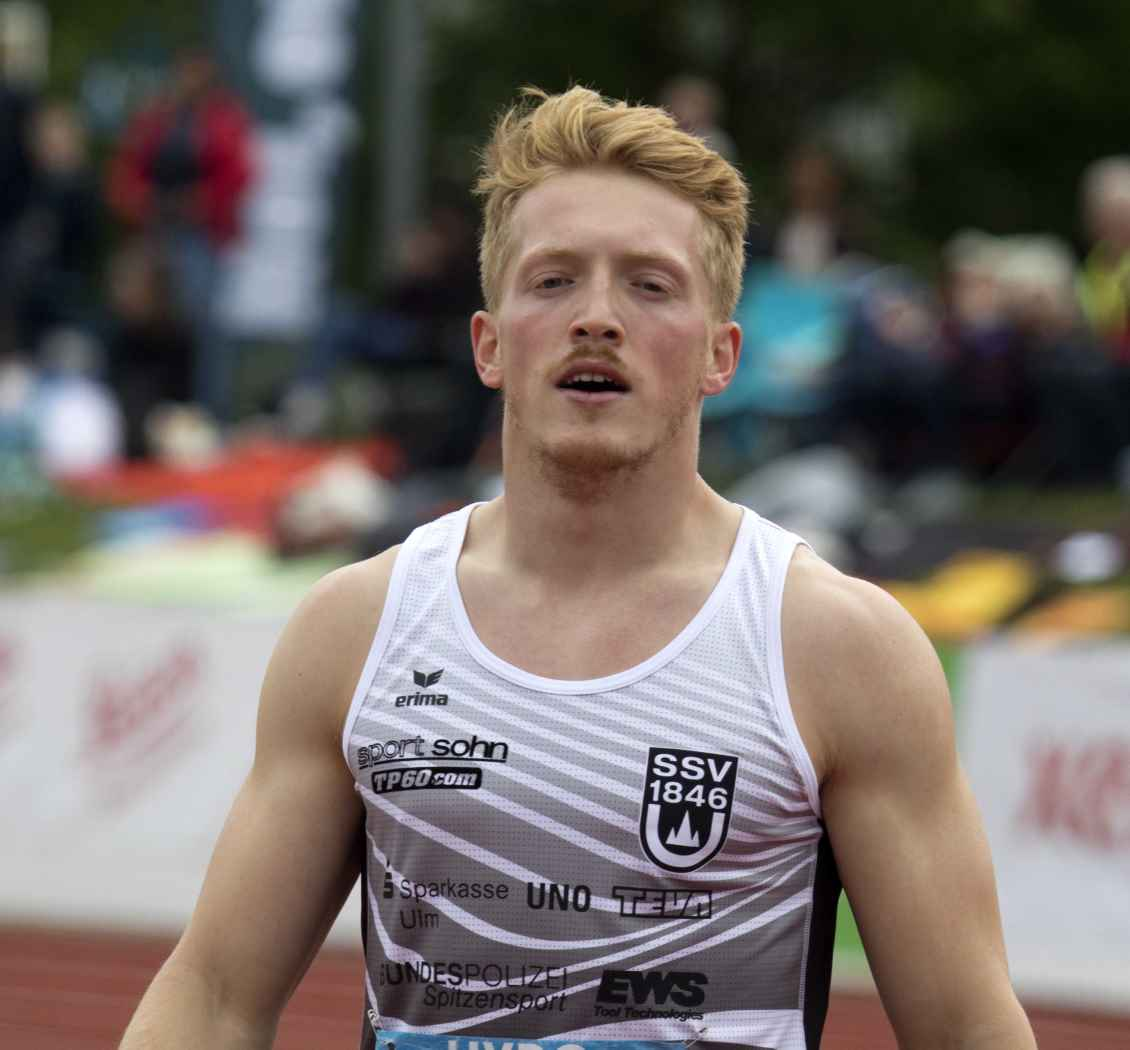

Personal information
- Nationality: German
- Born: 28 January 1997 (age 29)

Sport
- Sport: Athletics
- Event(s): Decathlon, Heptathlon

Achievements and titles
- Personal best(s): Decathlon: 8,351 (2023); Heptathlon: 6,047 (2023)
Medal record
Men's athletics
Representing the Germany
European U23 Championships
Bronze medal – third place	2019 Gävle	Decathlon
World U20 Championships
Bronze medal – third place	2016 Bydgoszcz	4 × 100 m relay

Manuel Eitel (born 28 January 1997) is a German multi-event athlete. He has competed at multiple major championships for Germany including the 2023 World Athletics Championships, and finished fourth in the heptathlon at the 2023 European Athletics Indoor Championships.

== Biography ==
From Baltmannsweiler, he is the oldest of four siblings. He started athletics at the age of dice years-old at TSV Baltmannsweiler, before becoming a member of SSV Ulm 1846 in 2013 where he began to be coached by Christopher Hellmann. He set a new German U18 record in the decathlon in August 2014 in Bernhausen, breaking the previous record set by Jan Felix Knobel.

He was a bronze medalist at the 2016 World Athletics U20 Championships in the 4 × 100 m relay in July 2016, in Bydgoszcz, Poland, alongside compatriots Roger Gurski, Thomas Barthel and Niels Torben Giese. He was a European Athletics U23 Championships bronze medallist in the decathlon in 2019. He subsequent needed surgery on an ankle injury in 2020, and split his training time between Ulm and Leverkusen during rehabilitation.

He won the senior German Athletics Championships in the decathlon in August 2022, setting a new personal best of 8189 for the decathlon in Bernhausen. The following month he improved his personal best by four points to 8,193 points whilst competing in Talence.

He finished fourth in the heptathlon at the 2023 European Athletics Indoor Championships in Istanbul, Turkey in March 2023. He placed eleventh in the decathlon at the 2023 World Athletics Championships in Budapest, Hungary.

He was selected for the 2024 European Athletics Championships in Rome, Italy, in June 2024. Competing in the decathlon he finished in seventh place overall with a tally of 8212 points.

Eitel moved his base to England to train with the coach Ashley Bryant. In March 2026, he competed in the heptathlon at the 2026 World Athletics Indoor Championships in Poland, placing ninth with 5818 points.

== Personal bests ==
Information from World Athletics profile unless otherwise noted.

=== Outdoor ===
As of 19 June 2025

Event	Performance	Location	Date	Points
Decathlon	—N/a	Götzis	27–28 May 2023	8,351 points
100 meters	10.31 (+1.6 m/s)	Mannheim	25 June 2016	1,021 points
Long jump	7.61 m (24 ft 11 1/2 in) (+0.6 m/s)	Ulm	20 May 2017	961 points
Shot put	15.28 m (50 ft 1 1/2 in)	Götzis	27 May 2023	807 points
High jump	2.00 m (6 ft 6 1/2 in)	Götzis	25 May 2019	803 points
400 meters	48.06	Braunschweig	29 June 2024	906 points
110 meters hurdles	14.26 (-0.9 m/s)	Marburg	13 August 2023	941 points
Discus throw	45.67 m (149 ft 10 in)	Filderstadt	28 August 2022	781 points
Pole vault	5.00 m (16 ft 4 3/4 in)	Rome	11 June 2024	910 points
Javelin throw	63.68 m (208 ft 11 in)	Talence	24 September 2023	793 points
1500 meters	4:33.70	Budapest	26 August 2023	720 points
Virtual Best Performance				8,653 points

=== Indoor ===
As of 19 June 2025

Event	Performance	Location	Date	Points
Heptathlon	—N/a	Istanbul	4–5 March 2023	6,047 points
60 meters	6.80	Aubière	13 January 2018	955 points
Long jump	7.53 m (24 ft 8 1/4 in)	Tallinn	13 February 2016	942 points
Shot put	14.76 m (48 ft 5 in)	Tallinn	2 February 2019	775 points
High jump	2.01 m (6 ft 7 in)	Istanbul	4 March 2023	813 points
60 meters hurdles	8.09	Tallinn	3 February 2019	959 points
Pole vault	4.86 m (15 ft 11 1/4 in)	Aubière	14 January 2018	868 points
1000 meters	2:44.45	Istanbul	5 March 2023	823 points
Virtual Best Performance				6,137 points

m
