= Michael Norman (sprinter) =

American sprinter (born 1997)

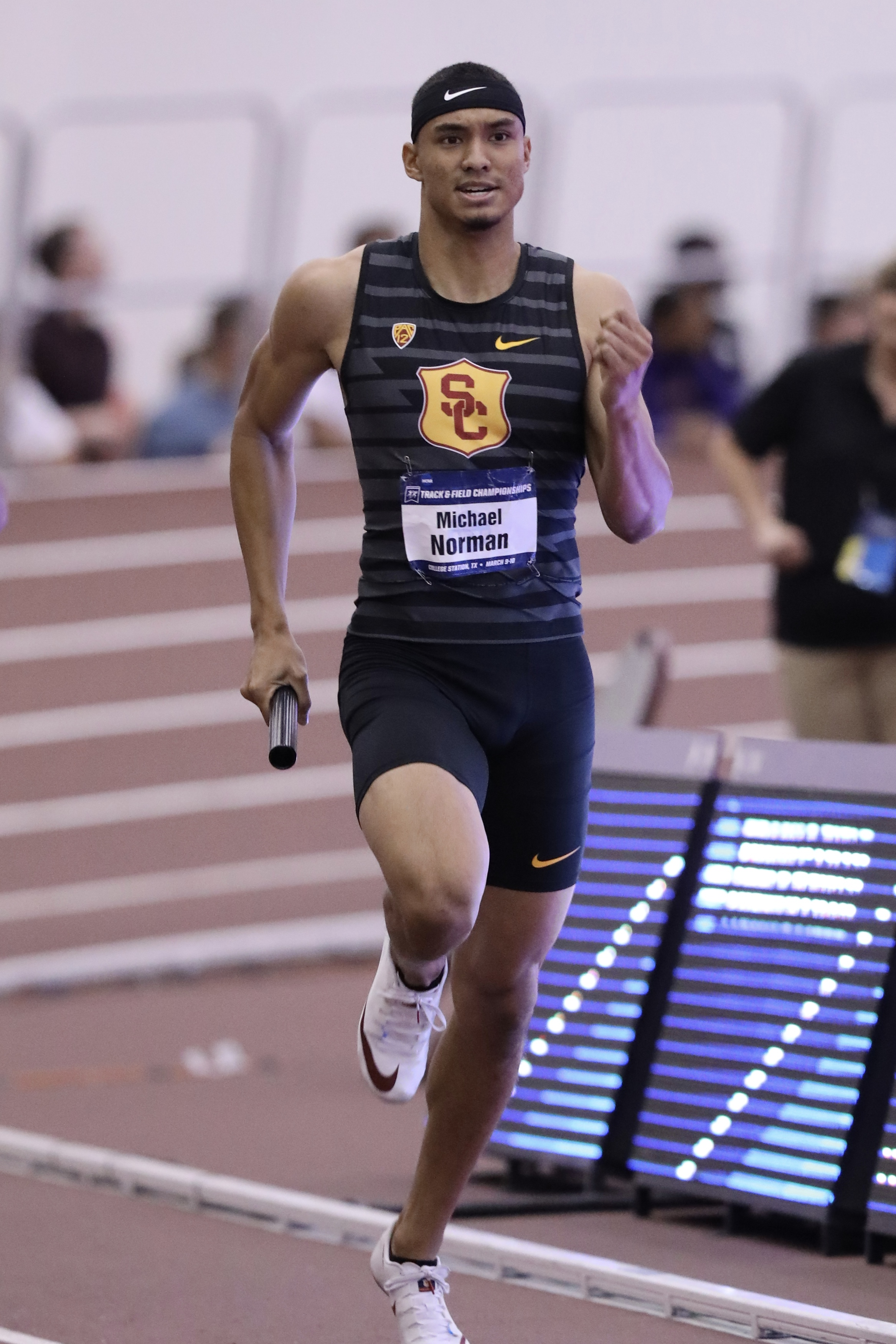
- Norman at the 2018 NCAA Division I Indoor Championships

Personal information
- Full name: Michael Arthur Norman Jr.
- Born: December 3, 1997 (age 28) San Diego, California, U.S.
- Employer: Nike
- Height: 6 ft 1 in (185 cm)
- Weight: 171 lb (78 kg)

Sport
- Country: United States
- Sport: Track and field
- Event: Sprints
- College team: USC Trojans (2017–2018)
- Coached by: Quincy Watts and Caryl Smith-Gilbert

Achievements and titles
- Personal bests: 100 m: 9.86 (2020) 200 m: 19.70 (2019); 400 m: 43.45 (2019) 400 m (relay split): 43.06 (2018)
Medal record
Men's athletics
Representing the United States
Olympic Games
Gold medal – first place	2020 Tokyo	4 × 400 m relay
World Championships
Gold medal – first place	2022 Eugene	400 m
Gold medal – first place	2022 Eugene	4 × 400 m relay
Diamond League
Winner	2019	400 m
World Junior Championships
Gold medal – first place	2016 Bydgoszcz	200 m
Gold medal – first place	2016 Bydgoszcz	4 × 100 m relay

Michael Arthur Norman Jr. (born December 3, 1997) is an American sprinter. He previously held the world best time in the indoor 400 meters at 44.52 seconds. Outdoors, his 43.45, set at the 2019 Mt. SAC Relays, is tied on sixth on the all time list. In 2016, he became the world junior champion in both the 200 meters and 4 × 100 meter relay. In 2022, he became the world champion in both the 400 meters and 4x400 meter relay.

Norman first gained international attention as a high school senior after he defeated reigning USA champion Justin Gatlin in a semi-final heat of the 200 meters at the 2016 Olympic Trials. He eventually placed fifth in the final and did not qualify for the Olympic team. However, he secured two gold medals at the World Junior Championships later that summer, highlighted by a championship record of 20.17 in the 200 meters.

A four-time NCAA champion, Norman set or helped set collegiate records in every NCAA final he ran in 2018. This includes his world best time in the indoor 400 meters and an unofficial world record in the indoor 4 × 400 meter relay when he anchored the USC Trojans to a winning time of 3:00.77.

Throughout his career, Norman has won numerous awards including the Gatorade Player of the Year awards for track and field in both 2015 and 2016, and The Bowerman in 2018. Norman graduated from the University of Southern California in May 2019 and currently competes professionally for Nike under his college coaches Quincy Watts and Caryl Smith Gilbert. Michael Norman is one of only 3 men along with Wayde Van Niekerk and Fred Kerley to go sub 10 seconds in 100 m, sub 20 seconds in 200 m and sub 44 seconds in 400 m.

== Biography ==
Norman was born to an African-American father and a Japanese mother in San Diego, California.

=== High school ===
As a high school junior at Vista Murrieta in Murrieta, CA, Norman broke the NFHS record in the 400 meters with a time of 45.19 seconds at the 2015 CIF California State Meet held at Buchanan High School on June 6, 2015. His time is the fastest 400 meters run by a U.S. high school athlete against other high school-aged athletes, along with Aldrich Bailey who also ran 45.19 seconds in Lubbock, Texas on April 28, 2012.

On June 6, 2015, Norman had arguably one of the most impressive one-day performances by a high school athlete. The Vista Murrieta High School junior started his day at the 2015 CIF California State Meet by completely separating from the field on the first leg of the 4 × 100 meter relay, a performance that PrepCalTrack editor Rich Gonzalez described as "jaw-dropping." In his second event of the day, Norman ran 45.19 seconds in the 400 meters, a time that ranked #6 all-time for U.S. high school athletes and tied the NFHS record. Norman came back to win his second individual state title in the 200 meters with a time of 20.30 seconds, a time that also ranked #6 all-time for U.S. high school athletes. Just one hour later, Norman was back on the track with his team for the 4 × 400 meter relay and produced yet another memorable performance by splitting roughly 44.9 seconds on the anchor leg to bring Vista Murrieta from 7th place to 3rd place in the event. With a total contribution of 21.5 points out of the 37 points scored, Norman led his school to its first-ever state title in any sport. Also worth noting is that, including the preliminary rounds from the previous day, Norman ran 7 races within 28 hours at the CIF California State Meet and still produced some of the top marks in the history of high school athletics.

On June 13, 2015, Norman competed in the Adidas Dream 100 meters at the Adidas Grand Prix at Icahn Stadium. With this being his first competitive race in the 100 meters, Norman shocked some of the most talented U.S. high school 100 meter runners by winning the race in 10.36 seconds (-0.5 m/s). On June 27, 2015, Norman set a California state record in the 200 meters at the 2015 USA Junior Outdoor Track and Field Championships at Hayward Field by running 20.24 seconds, and in doing so equaled the #5 all-time mark for U.S. high school athletes in the event. This race also ranked Norman #8 all-time on the U.S. junior (under-20) list and #10 all-time on the world junior list. Norman's placement in this race qualified him to compete at the 2015 Pan American Junior Athletics Championships, but he decided to forgo his spot on the United States team to avoid extending his competitive season by another month. Norman's times from the 2015 season in both the 200 meters and 400 meters made him eligible to compete at the 2016 United States Olympic Trials.

On June 30, 2015, Norman was named the Gatorade Player of the Year for his achievements in track and field. He is only the 28th non-senior to win the Gatorade Player of the Year award in the 30-year history of the program across all sports and the first male sprinter to win the honor as a non-senior.

=== College ===
On March 10, 2018, Norman competed at the NCAA Division I Indoor Track and Field Championships and ran an American and collegiate record in the 400 meters with a world best time of 44.52 seconds. Later that day he, along with the rest of the USC Trojans 4 × 400 meter relay team, broke the American and collegiate record in a world best time of 3:00.77. Both of the 400 meters and 4 × 400 meter relay performances were faster than the official world records, but they were not ratified due to various technical reasons, including teammate Rai Benjamin having not been cleared by the IAAF to represent the United States yet. On June 8, 2018, Norman ran a 2018 world leading time in the 400 meters with a time of 43.61 seconds at the NCAA Division I Outdoor Track and Field Championships. This time ranked him as the sixth fastest 400 meter runner in history.

To cap off his collegiate career, Norman was named winner of The Bowerman for the 2018 track and field season. He was the first USC Trojan to win the award. His teammate and best friend, Rai Benjamin was also one of the three finalists.

=== Professional career ===
Michael Norman made his pro debut on June 30, 2018, at the 2018 IAAF Diamond League in Paris, winning the (non-scoring) 200 m in a personal best time of 19.84 s, ahead of his USC teammate Rai Benjamin who finished second in 19.99 s.

On July 20, 2020, while competing in the 100 m sprint at the AP Ranch High Performance Invite #2 Track Meet he ran a 9.86s his first sub-10 100 m sprint. With this performance, Michael Norman became the second athlete, after 400 m World Record holder Wayde van Niekerk, to join the "Sub 10s, 20s, 44s club for the 100 m, 200 m & 400 m sprints". Fred Kerley joined the club in 2021.

Norman's 2022 outdoor season was undoubtedly his best to date. In addition to winning his second U.S. Track and Field Championship 400 m title, he won the Kamila Skolimowska Memorial and Prefontaine Classic at 400m - his seventh and eighth Diamond League wins. At the 2022 World Athletics Championships, he won gold in the 400 m in a time of 44.29 and followed up his victory with a relay medal in 4 × 400 m relay.

In 2023, Norman left his longtime coach Quincy Watts and undertook an unsuccessful pivot to the 100 m under coach John Smith. He was eliminated in the first round of the USA Outdoor Track and Field Championships in the event and ended his season shortly after. Norman returned to Watts and the 400 m in November 2023 in anticipation of the 2024 Olympic Games.

== Statistics ==
Information from World Athletics profile unless otherwise noted.

=== Personal bests ===
Surface	Event	Time	Competition	Venue	Date	Notes
Outdoor	100 m	9.86 (+1.6 m/s)	AP Ranch High Performance Invite #2	Fort Worth, Texas (Athletic Performance Ranch)	July 20, 2020	WL
Outdoor	200 m	19.70 (+0.7 m/s)	Golden Gala	Rome, Italy (Stadio Olimpico)	June 6, 2019	WL, MR
Outdoor	400 m	43.45	Mt. SAC Relays	Torrance, California (Murdock Stadium)	April 20, 2019	WL, MR, FR, #4 all-time
Outdoor	400 m (relay split)	43.06	NCAA Division I West Preliminary	Sacramento, California (Hornet Stadium)	May 26, 2018	#3 all-time
Outdoor	4 × 100 m relay	38.88	USC Power 5 Challenge	Los Angeles, California (Loker Stadium)	March 24, 2018	
Outdoor	4 × 200 m relay	1:24.53	Arcadia Invitational	Arcadia, California (Arcadia High School)	April 10, 2015	MR
Outdoor	4 × 400 m relay	2:55.70	2020 Summer Olympic	Tokyo, Japan (Japan National Stadium)	August 3, 2021	WL
Indoor	200 m	20.75	Tyson Invitational	Fayetteville, Arkansas (Randal Tyson Track Center)	February 11, 2017	
Indoor	400 m	44.52	NCAA Division I Indoor Championships	College Station, Texas (Gilliam Indoor Track Stadium)	March 10, 2018	WB
Indoor	4 × 400 m relay	3:00.77	NCAA Division I Indoor Championships	College Station, Texas (Gilliam Indoor Track Stadium)	March 10, 2018	WB

=== Seasonal bests ===
The highlighted times are track records, correct August 2024.

400 m
Year	Time	Venue	Date
2013	49.54	Murrieta, California (Vista Murrieta High School)	April 25
2014	46.94	Clovis, California (Veterans Memorial Stadium)	June 7
2015	45.19	Clovis, California (Veterans Memorial Stadium)	June 6
2016	45.51	Arcadia, California (Arcadia High School)	May 9
2017	44.60	Sacramento, California (Hornet Stadium)	June 23
2018	43.61	Eugene, Oregon (Hayward Field)	June 8
2019	43.45	Torrance, California (Murdock Stadium)	April 20
2020	51.30	Fort Worth, Texas (Athletic Performance Ranch)	July 23
2021	44.07	Eugene, Oregon (Hayward Field)	June 20
2022	43.56	Eugene, Oregon (Hayward Field)	June 25
2024	44.10	Saint Denis, France (Stade de France)	August 4

200 m
Year	Time	Venue	Date
2014	20.82	Norwalk, California (Cerritos College Falcon Stadium)	May 30
2015	20.24	Eugene, Oregon (Hayward Field)	June 27
2016	20.14	Eugene, Oregon (Hayward Field)	July 9
2017	20.75i	Fayetteville, Arkansas (Randal Tyson Track Center)	February 11
2018	19.84	Paris, France (Stade Sébastien Charléty)	June 30
2019	19.70	Rome, Italy (Stadio Olimpico)	June 6
2022	19.76	Lausanne, Switzerland (Stade Olympique de la Pontaise)	August 22
2023	20.65	Doha, Qatar (Suhaim bin Hamad Stadium)	May 5

100 m
Year	Time	Venue	Date
2013	11.19	Murrieta, California (Vista Murrieta High School)	March 2
2014	10.73	Murrieta, California (Vista Murrieta High School)	April 23
2015	10.36	Randalls Island, New York	June 13
2016	10.27	Walnut, California	April 16
2020	9.86	AP Ranch, Fort Worth, Texas	July 20
2021	9.97	Stadio Colbachini, Padua, Italy	September 5

=== National competition record ===
Representing the Vista Murrieta High Broncos (2015–2016), USC Trojans (2017–2018), and Nike (2019–2021)
Year	Competition	Venue	Position	Event	Times	Notes
2015	U.S. Junior Championships	Eugene, Oregon (Hayward Field)	2nd	200 m	20.24	PB
2016	U.S. Junior Championships	Clovis, California (Veterans Memorial Stadium)	1st	200 m	20.15	MR, PB
2016	U.S. Olympic Trials	Eugene, Oregon (Hayward Field)	20th	400 m	46.21	
2016	U.S. Olympic Trials	Eugene, Oregon (Hayward Field)	5th	200 m	20.14	PB
2017	NCAA Division I Championships	Eugene, Oregon (Hayward Field)	4th	400 m	44.88	PB
2017	NCAA Division I Championships	Eugene, Oregon (Hayward Field)	13th	4 × 400 m relay	3:05.80	
2017	U.S. Championships	Sacramento, California (Hornet Stadium)	7th	400 m	44.80	
2018	NCAA Division I Indoor Championships	College Station, Texas (Gilliam Indoor Track Stadium)	1st	400 m	44.52	WB
2018	NCAA Division I Indoor Championships	College Station, Texas (Gilliam Indoor Track Stadium)	1st	4 × 400 m relay	3:00.77	WB
2018	NCAA Division I Championships	Eugene, Oregon (Hayward Field)	1st	400 m	43.61	WL, CR, FR, PB
2018	NCAA Division I Championships	Eugene, Oregon (Hayward Field)	1st	4 × 400 m relay	2:59.00	WL, CR, FR
2018	U.S. Championships	Des Moines, Iowa (Drake Stadium)	DNS	200 m	—	(Note: Qualified for the final but did not start (DNS).)
2019	U.S. Championships	Des Moines, Iowa (Drake Stadium)	2nd	400 m	43.79	
2021	U.S. Olympic Trials	Eugene, Oregon (Hayward Field)	1st	400 m	44.07	
2022	U.S. Championships	Eugene, Oregon (Hayward Field)	1st	400 m	43.56	WL, FR
2023	U.S. Championships	Eugene, Oregon (Hayward Field)	27th	100 m	10.31	

- NCAA results from Track & Field Results Reporting System.

=== International competition record ===
Representing the United States
Year	Competition	Venue	Position	Event	Times	Notes
2016	World U20 Championships	Bydgoszcz, Poland (Zdzisław Krzyszkowiak Stadium)	1st	200 m	20.17	MR
2016	World U20 Championships	Bydgoszcz, Poland (Zdzisław Krzyszkowiak Stadium)	1st	4 × 100 m relay	38.93	WU20L
2019	World Championships	Doha, Qatar (Khalifa International Stadium)	22nd	400 m	45.94	
2021	Olympic Games	Tokyo, Japan	5th	400 m	44.31	
2021	Olympic Games	Tokyo, Japan	1st	4 × 400 m relay	2:55.70	SB
2022	World Championships	Eugene, Oregon (Hayward Field)	1st	400 m	44.29	
2022	World Championships	Eugene, Oregon (Hayward Field)	1st	4 × 400 m relay	2:56.17	SB
2024	Olympic Games	Paris, France (Stade de France)	8th	400 m	45.62	

=== Circuit Wins ===
Outdoor

- Diamond League
  - Final winner: 2019 (400 m, Brussels)
  - Paris: 2018 (200 m)
  - Rome: 2019 (200 m)
  - Stockholm: 2019 (400 m)
  - Eugene: 2019 (400 m)
  - Brussels: 2019 (400 m)
  - Doha: 2021 (400 m)
  - Eugene: 2022 (400 m)

Indoor

- World Indoor Tour Gold
  - Boston: 2021 (400 m)

== See also ==
- 2020 in 100 metres

== Notes ==
Achievements
Preceded by (South Africa) Wayde van Niekerk	Men's 400 meters season's best 2018, 2019	Succeeded by (United States) Justin Robinson
Awards
Preceded by Christian Coleman	Men's The Bowerman; 2018	Succeeded by Grant Holloway
