= Brandon Carnes =

American athlete (born 1995)

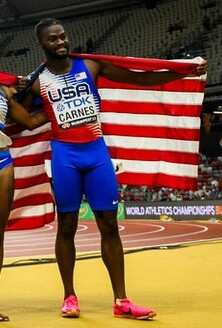
- Brandon Carnes in 2023

Personal information
- Nationality: American
- Born: 6 March 1995 (age 31)

Sport
- Sport: Athletics
- Event: Sprint

Achievements and titles
- Personal bests: 100 m: 10.01 (Xiamen, 2023); 200 m: 20.07 (New York, 2022)
Medal record
Men's athletics
Representing the United States
World Championships
Gold medal – first place	2023 Budapest	4 × 100 m relay
NACAC Championships
Gold medal – first place	2022 Freeport	4 × 100 m relay
Bronze medal – third place	2022 Freeport	100 m

Brandon Carnes (born 6 March 1995) is an American track and field athlete who competes as a sprinter. He was a two-time medalist at the 2022 NACAC Championships.

== Early and personal life ==
From Bradenton, Florida, he attended Manatee High School, where his brother Brion Carnes played football as a quarterback. He then attended the University of Northern Iowa.

== Career ==
Running for the University of Northern Iowa, he lowered his personal best for the 100 m to 10.06 in 2017 in Iowa City.

In May 2022, he set a new personal best 100 m time of 10.02 s in Ponce, Puerto Rico. He was a bronze medalist in the 100 m at the 2022 NACAC Championships held at the Grand Bahama Sport Complex in Freeport, Grand Bahama. He was then part of the victorious American 4 × 100 m relay that won gold at the event.

In June 2023, he equalled his personal best 100 m time of 10.02 in winning the Music City Track Carnival. Competing at the 2023 USA Outdoor Track and Field Championships, in Eugene, Oregon, he reached the final of the 100 m competition in which he finished fourth overall. He was selected for the 2023 World Athletics Championships in Budapest in August 2023. In September 2023, he lowered his 100 metres personal best to 10.01 seconds at the Diamond League event in Xiamen, China.

He reached the semi-finals of the 100 metres at the 2025 USA Outdoor Track and Field Championships.

Carnes was named in the United States team for the 2026 World Athletics Relays in Gaborone, Botswana.
