= Emmanuel Yeboah (sprinter) =

Ghanaian sprinter (born 1997)

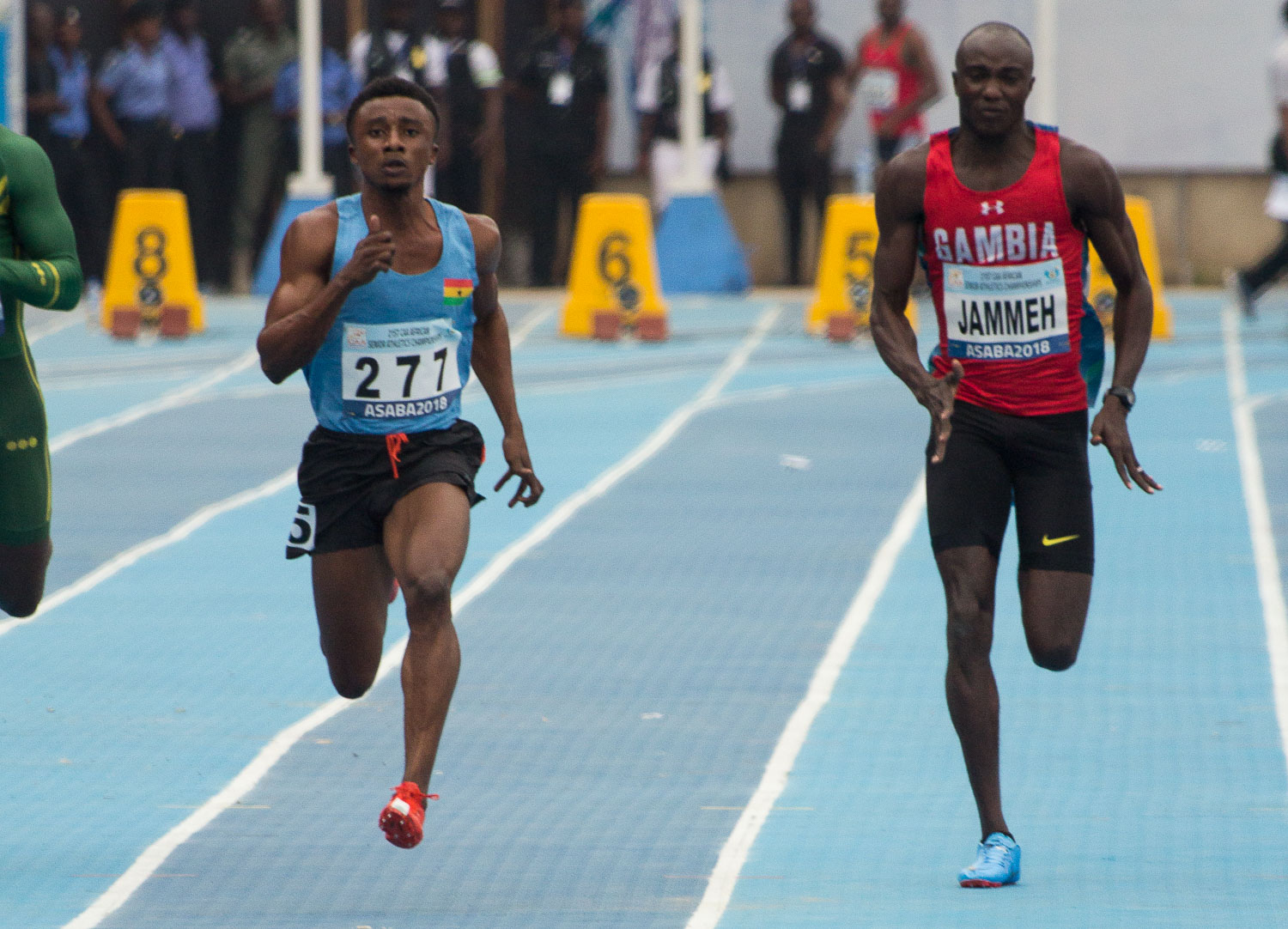
- Yeboah (left) at the 2018 African Championships

Personal information
- Born: 10 August 1997 (age 28)

Sport
- Sport: Track and field
- Event: 100 metres

Emmanuel Yeboah (born 10 August 1997) is a Ghanaian sprinter, who currently competes at Texas A&M University. Yeboah was selected to represent Ghana at the 2020 Summer Olympics in the Men's 4 × 100 m relay.
