= Nigel Ellis =

Jamaican sprinter (born 1997)

Personal information
- Born: 8 August 1997 (age 28) St. James, Jamaica
- Height: 1.83 m (6 ft 0 in)
- Weight: 76 kg (168 lb)

Sport
- Sport: Athletics
- Event(s): 100 m, 200 m
Medal record
Men's Athletics
Representing Jamaica
Commonwealth Games
Bronze medal – third place	2018 Gold Coast	4x100 m
NACAC Championships
Bronze medal – third place	2018 Toronto	200 m
World Junior Championships
Bronze medal – third place	2016 Bydgoszcz	200 m

Nigel Ellis (born 8 August 1997) is a Jamaican sprinter. He represented his country in the 100 metres at the 2018 Commonwealth Games reaching the semifinals. He also won a bronze medal in the 200 metres at the 2016 World U20 Championships.

== International competitions ==
Year	Competition	Venue	Position	Event	Notes
Representing Jamaica
2014	CARIFTA Games (U18)	Fort-de-France, Martinique	1st	4 × 400 m relay	3:12.63
2015	CARIFTA Games (U20)	Basseterre, Saint Kitts and Nevis	3rd (h)	200 m	21.45^{1}
2015	CARIFTA Games (U20)	Basseterre, Saint Kitts and Nevis	1st	4 × 100 m relay	40.39
2016	CARIFTA Games (U20)	St. George's, Grenada	1st	100 m	10.16
2016	CARIFTA Games (U20)	St. George's, Grenada	–	200 m	DQ
2016	CARIFTA Games (U20)	St. George's, Grenada	1st	4 × 100 m relay	39.74
2016	World U20 Championships	Bydgoszcz, Poland	3rd	100 m	20.63
2016	World U20 Championships	Bydgoszcz, Poland	4th	4 × 100 m relay	39.13
2018	Commonwealth Games	Gold Coast, Australia	17th (sf)	100 m	10.38
2018	Commonwealth Games	Gold Coast, Australia	2nd (h)	4 × 100 m relay	38.44
2018	NACAC Championships	Toronto, Canada	3rd	200 m	20.57
2018	NACAC Championships	Toronto, Canada	4th	4 × 100 m relay	38.96
2019	World Relays	Yokohama, Japan	6th	4 × 100 m relay	38.88
2019	World Relays	Yokohama, Japan	–	4 × 200 m relay	DQ
2022	World Indoor Championships	Belgrade, Serbia	14th (sf)	60 m	6.65

^{1}Did not start in the final

== Personal bests ==
Outdoor

- 60 metres – 6.77 (-1.1 m/s, Kingston 2017)
- 100 metres – 10.04 (+2.0 m/s, Miami Fl 2021)
- 200 metres – 20.36 (-0.2 m/s, Kingston 2018)
