= Jack Hale (sprinter) =

Australian sprinter (born 1998)

- Hale in 2016

Personal information
- Born: 22 May 1998 (age 28) Hobart, Tasmania, Australia

Sport
- Sport: Athletics
- Events: 100 metres, 4 × 100 metres relay, 200 metres, long jump

Jack Hale (born 22 May 1998) is an Australian sprinter. Hale was born in Hobart and was the winner of Australian national schools championships in the 100m sprint and long jump. In 2016, he broke the Australian under-20 100m sprint record with a time of 10.21s and finished 2nd in the 100m event at the Australian Athletics Championships.

He was a member of the Australian 4 × 100 m relay team which finished 4th at the 2018 Gold Coast Commonwealth Games, along with Rohan Browning, Joshua Clarke and Trae Williams.

In 2019, he finished 3rd in the 100m events at the Australian Athletics Championships and the Oceania Athletics Championships.

He set a personal best in the 100m of 10.12s (wind +1.5) at the Western Australian Athletics Stadium on 1 February 2020.

He was a member of the Australian 4 × 100 m relay team which failed to finish its heat at the 2022 Birmingham Commonwealth Games, along with Joshua Azzopardi, Jacob Despard, and Rohan Browning.
