= Emmanuel Arowolo =

Nigerian sprinter (born 1997)

Personal information
- Full name: Olawunmi Emmanuel Arowolo
- Nationality: Nigerian
- Born: 7 August 1997 (age 28) Ifo, Nigeria

Sport
- Sport: Track and field
- Event: 100 metres

Achievements and titles
- Personal bests: 100 m – 10.31 (2018); 200 m – 20.37 (2019)
Medal record
Men's athletics
Representing Nigeria
African Championships
Silver medal – second place	2018 Asaba	4×100 m

Olawunmi Emmanuel Arowolo (born 7 August 1997) is a Nigerian sprinter. He competed at the 2018 Commonwealth Games in the 200 metres and 4x100 metres relay. He was a member of the Nigerian team that qualified for the final only to suffer disqualification. In 2018, he competed at the African Championships in Asaba and won a silver medal in the 4×100 metres relay. In 2019, he was a member of the Nigerian 4 × 100 m relay team that won a silver medal in the 2019 African Games.

Emmanuel Arowolo gained his first experience in international competitions at the 2016 U20 World Championships in Bydgoszcz, Poland, where he dropped out over 200 meters with 21.16 seconds in the semifinals, as well as with the Nigerian 4 x 100 metres relay.
