= Frederik Schou-Nielsen =

Danish sprinter (born 1996)

Personal information
- Nationality: Danish
- Born: 5 February 1996 (age 29) Copenhagen, Denmark

Sport
- Sport: Athletics
- Event: 100 metres

Frederik Schou-Nielsen (born 5 February 1996) is a Danish athlete. He competed in the men's 4 × 100 metres relay event at the 2020 Summer Olympics.
