= Jun Yamashita =

Japanese sprinter (born 1997)

Personal information
- Nationality: Japanese
- Born: 23 August 1997 (age 28)

Sport
- Sport: Athletics
- Event: Sprinting

Jun Yamashita (山下 潤, Yamashita Jun; born 23 August 1997) is a Japanese athlete. He competed in the men's 200 metres event at the 2019 World Athletics Championships.
