= Paulo André de Oliveira =

Brazilian sprinter

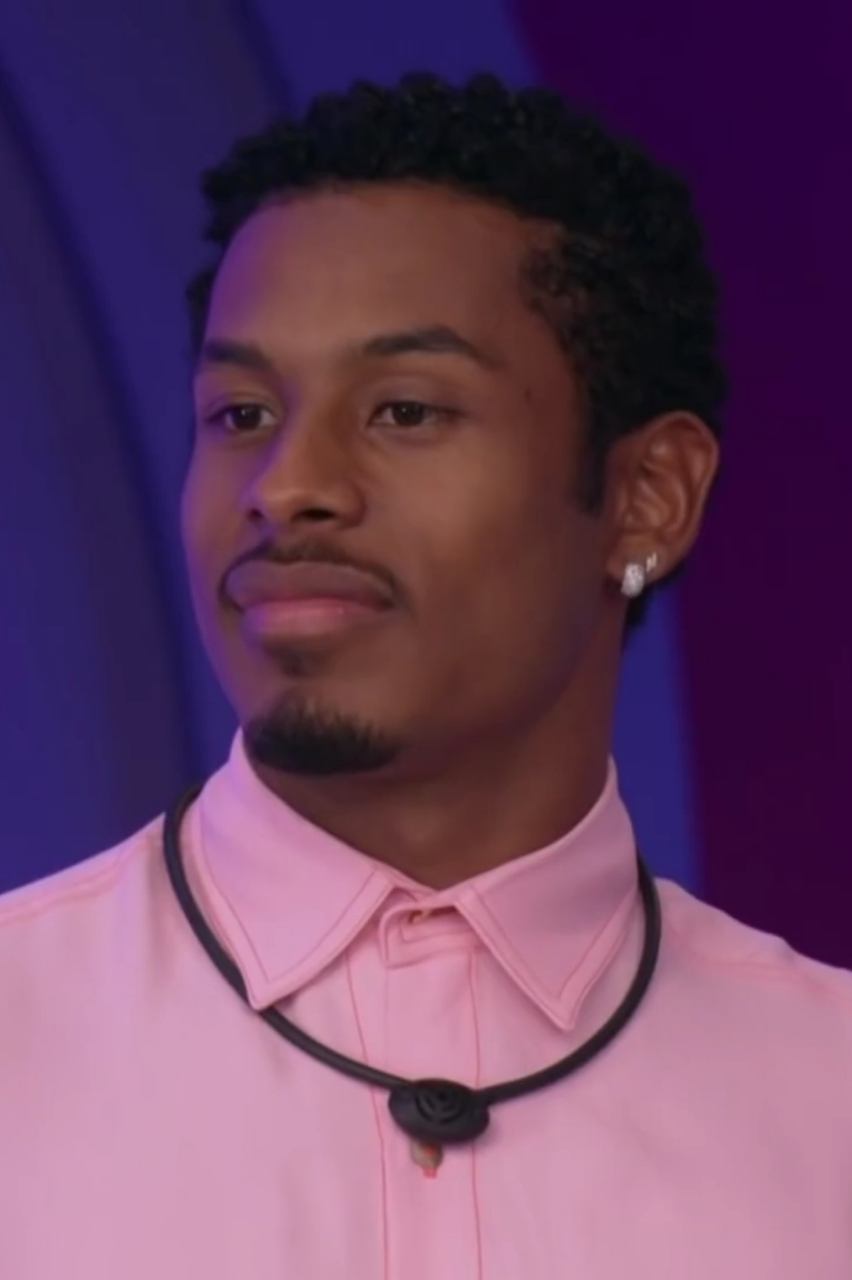
- Oliveira in 2022

Personal information
- Full name: Paulo André Camilo de Oliveira
- Born: August 20, 1998 (age 27) Santo André, São Paulo, Brazil
- Education: Universidade Paulista

Sport
- Sport: Athletics
- Events: 100 m, 200 m
- Club: EC Pinheiros

Achievements and titles
- Personal bests: 100 m: 10.02 (w: –0.6 m/s) – Bragança Paulista, 2018; 200 m: 20.28 (w: +0.5 m/s) – Naples, 2019; 4×100 m relay: 37.72 – Doha, 2019
Medal record
Men's athletics
Representing Brazil
World Relays
Gold medal – first place	2019 Yokohama	4×100 m relay
Pan American Games
Gold medal – first place	2019 Lima	4×100 m relay
Silver medal – second place	2019 Lima	100 m
Summer Universiade
Gold medal – first place	2019 Napoli	100 m
Gold medal – first place	2019 Napoli	200 m

Paulo André Camilo de Oliveira (often called Camilo to avoid homonymy, born 20 August 1998) is a Brazilian sprinter. In the 100 metres, he was a silver medalist at the 2019 Pan American Games, and a semifinalist in the World Athletics Championships of the same year. He also won the 4 × 100 metres relay at the 2019 World Relays.

At the 2019 Troféu Brasil de Atletismo he managed to run the 100 m in a time of 9.90 seconds, but the time was not ratified due to the wind conditions.

== Professional athletics career ==
He is the son of a former sprinter Carlos José Camilo de Oliveira, who represented Brazil in the 1980s.

He began to stand out by participating in the team from Brazil that won the 2019 World Relays, held in Yokohama, Japan, with a mark of 38.05. At the 2019 Summer Universiade in Naples, Italy, he won two gold medals in the 100 m and 200 m sprints. He won the 100 m with the 10.09 mark.

In 2016 his best mark in the 100 m was 10.26, evolving to 10.18 in 2017. On September 14, 2018, he obtained the 10.02 mark for the first time, the second best mark in the history of Brazil in the 100m, only behind to Robson da Silva, with 10.00. He repeated the 10.02 time in April 2019.

At the 2019 Pan American Games, held in Lima, Peru, he won the silver medal in the 100 m, event that Brazil has not won a medal since 1999, and gold in Brazil's 4×100 m relay.

In August 2019, at the Troféu Brasil de Atletismo, he won the 100m with the 9.90 mark, which was just not validated as a new South American Record because it was obtained with a wind of +3.2 m/s (the limit is + 2 m/s).

In late September 2019, he went to the World Athletics Championships in Doha, Qatar, where he won his 100 m heat with a mark of 10.11. The last time a Brazilian had gone to a semifinal in this event was in Gothenburg in 1995. He was just 0.03s from qualifying for the final: he finished 12th overall, with a mark of 10.14 in the semis, while the 8th and last classified for the final got 10.12.

He qualified to represent Brazil at the 2020 Summer Olympics.

== International competitions ==
Year	Competition	Venue	Position	Event	Notes
Representing Brazil
2015	South American Junior Championships	Cuenca, Ecuador	4th	200 m	21.24
2015	South American Junior Championships	Cuenca, Ecuador	1st	4 × 100 m relay	39.90
2015	World Youth Championships	Cali, Colombia	8th	100 m	10.83
2015	World Youth Championships	Cali, Colombia	–	200 m	DNF
2016	World U20 Championships	Bydgoszcz, Poland	5th	100 m	10.29
2016	World U20 Championships	Bydgoszcz, Poland	–	4 × 100 m relay	DQ
2017	Pan American U20 Championships	Trujillo, Peru	2nd	100 m	10.46
2017	Pan American U20 Championships	Trujillo, Peru	–	200 m	DNF
2018	Ibero-American Championships	Trujillo, Peru	1st	100 m	10.27
2018	Ibero-American Championships	Trujillo, Peru	1st	4 × 100 m relay	38.78
2019	World Relays	Yokohama, Japan	1st	4 × 100 m relay	38.05
2019	World Relays	Yokohama, Japan	–	4 × 200 m relay	DNF
2019	Universiade	Naples, Italy	1st	100 m	10.09
2019	Universiade	Naples, Italy	1st	200 m	20.28
2019	Universiade	Naples, Italy	7th	4 × 100 m relay	1:23.05
2019	Pan American Games	Lima, Peru	2nd	100 m	10.16
2019	Pan American Games	Lima, Peru	1st	4 × 100 m relay	38.27
2019	World Championships	Doha, Qatar	12th (sf)	100 m	10.14
2019	World Championships	Doha, Qatar	36th (h)	200 m	20.75
2019	World Championships	Doha, Qatar	4th	4 × 100 m relay	37.72
2021	World Relays	Chorzów, Poland	2nd (h)	4 × 100 m relay	38.45^{1}
2021	Olympic Games	Tokyo, Japan	23rd (sf)	100 m	10.31
2021	Olympic Games	Tokyo, Japan	12th (h)	4 × 100 m relay	38.34
2023	South American Championships	São Paulo, Brazil	3rd	100 m	10.03
2023	South American Championships	São Paulo, Brazil	1st	4 × 100 m relay	38.70
2023	World Championships	Budapest, Hungary	34th (h)	100 m	10.25
2023	World Championships	Budapest, Hungary	8th (h)	4 × 100 m relay	38.19
2023	Pan American Games	Santiago, Chile	21st (h)	100 m	49.83
2023	Pan American Games	Santiago, Chile	1st	4 × 100 m relay	38.68
2024	Olympic Games	Paris, France	61st (h)	100 m	10.46

^{1}Disqualified in the final

== Personal life ==
In 2022, Oliveira was cast as a contestant in Big Brother Brasil's 22nd season. He came in 2nd place, losing to actor and singer Arthur Aguiar.
