= Trae Williams (sprinter) =

Australian track and field sprinter (born 1997)

Personal information
- Nickname: Quadzilla
- Born: 5 May 1997 (age 29) South Brisbane, Queensland, Australia
- Education: St John's Anglican College, Brisbane
- Height: 170 cm (5 ft 7 in)
- Weight: 76 kg (168 lb)

Sport
- Country: Australia
- Sport: Men's Athletics
- Events: 100 metres, 200 metres
- Coached by: Daniel Williams

Achievements and titles
- National finals: 2017 Athletics Championships: Men's 100 m – Silver; 2018 Athletics Championships, Gold Coast: Men's 100 m – Gold
- Personal bests: 10.1 seconds 2018 National Athletics Championships, Gold Coast): Men's 100 m
Medal record
Men's athletics
Representing Australia
Youth Olympic Games
Bronze medal – third place	2014 Nanjing	100 metres

Trae Williams (born 5 May 1997) is an Australian track and field sprinter. Williams is the 2018 Australian men's 100-metre athletic champion, having been the runner-up and first-placed Australian in 2017. He was until 2024 the fifth-fastest Australian of all time with a personal best time of 10.10 seconds achieved on 16 February 2018, after Patrick Johnson (9.93 in 2003), Rohan Browning (10.01 in 2021), Matt Shirvington (10.03 in 1998) and Josh Ross (10.08 in 2007).

Williams made the decision in August, 2020 to switch from athletics to rugby sevens. This was a gamble as it was uncertain whether he would make the Australian Rugby Sevens 2020 Olympics team. He was not part of the squad that went to Tokyo.

== Early years ==
Aged 16 years, Williams won the bronze medal for the 100 metres at the 2014 Nanjing Summer Youth Olympics.

Educated at the St John's Anglican College, Brisbane, Williams played rugby union and rugby league as a schoolboy and considered playing for the Brisbane Broncos in the National Rugby League before focussing on a career in athletics.
