= Abdul Hakim Sani Brown =

Japanese sprinter (born 1999)

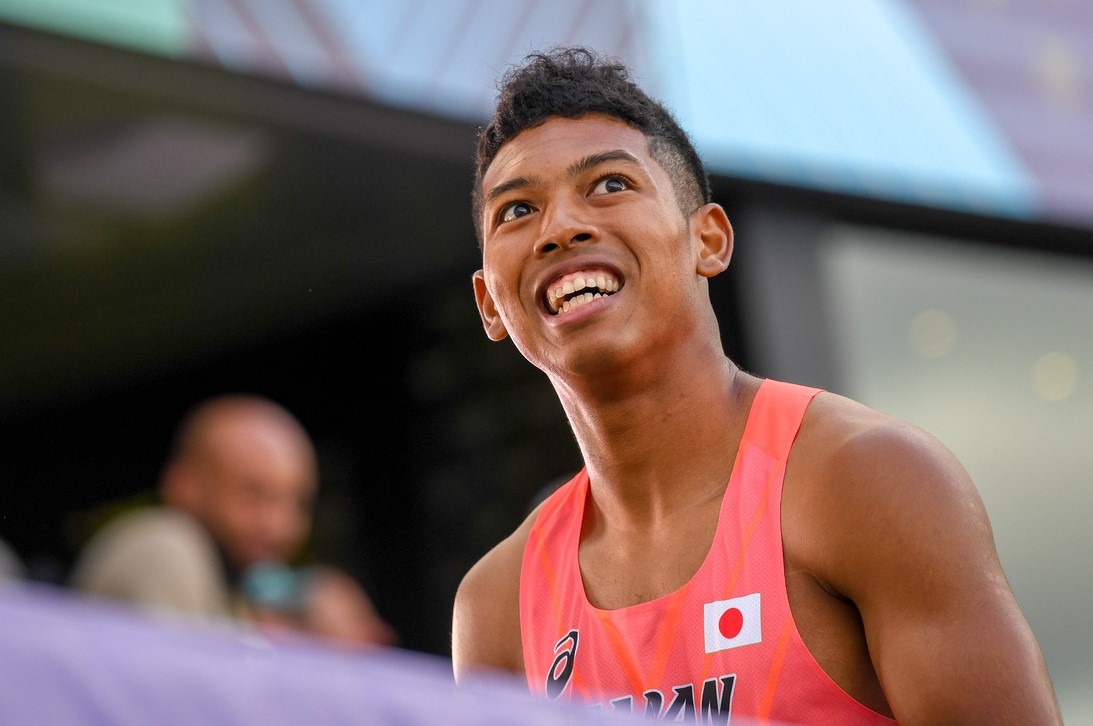
- Sani Brown at the 2022 World Athletics Championships

Personal information
- Nationality: Japanese
- Born: 6 March 1999 (age 27) Kitakyushu, Fukuoka Prefecture, Japan
- Height: 1.88 m (6 ft 2 in)
- Weight: 83 kg (183 lb)

Sport
- Country: Japan
- Sport: Athletics
- Event: Sprinting
- College team: University of Florida
- Club: Tumbleweed TC

Achievements and titles
- Personal bests: 100m: 9.96 (2024); 200m: 20.08 (2019)
Medal record
Men's athletics
Representing Japan
World Championships
Bronze medal – third place	2019 Doha	4×100 m relay
World Youth Championships
Gold medal – first place	2015 Cali	100 m
Gold medal – first place	2015 Cali	200 m

Abdul Hakim Sani Brown (サニブラウン・アブデル・ハキーム, Saniburaun Abuderu Hakīmu; born 6 March 1999) is a Japanese athlete specialising in sprinting events. He won the 100 metres at the 2015 World Youth Championships in Athletics setting a championship record of 10.28 (−0.4) in the final.

== Career ==
Sani Brown was born to a Japanese mother and a Ghanaian father. He ran for Josai High School, a private high school operated by the same corporation that operates Josai University in the Toshima ward of Tokyo. and qualified for the 2020 Tokyo Olympic Summer Games running 100 in 9.99 seconds on 12 May 2019.

Sani Brown finished as runner up at the 2015 Japanese senior National Championships in both the 100m and the 200m, but did not run a qualifying time for the world championships in either event. At the 2015 World Youth Championships in Athletics Sani Brown equalled his personal best of 10.30 in the 100m heats to set a new championship record before running 10.28 into a −0.3 headwind to improve that mark in the final. Three days later he doubled by winning the 200 metres in 20.34 into a −0.7 headwind. The time was .16 faster than the championship qualifying standard, thereby punching Sani Brown's ticket to the world championships as a sixteen year old.

At the 2015 World Championships Sani Brown qualified for the semi-final round against athletes who were at least three years his senior.

In 2016, he committed to the University of Florida. In the 2019 NCAA championships he set the former Japanese record at 9.97s. He was a member of the 4 × 100 m relay team which won the NCAA Championship in 2019.

At the 2022 World Championships, he became the first person from Japan to qualify for the finals in the 100m, running 9.98 in the heats and 10.06 in the finals for seventh place.
