= 2022 World Athletics U20 Championships – Men's 200 metres =

Men's 200 metres at the 2022 World Athletics U20 Championships
- Venue: Estadio Olímpico Pascual Guerrero
- Dates: 3 August (heats and semifinal); 4 August (final)
- Winning time: 19.96

Medalists
gold medal	Blessing Afrifah	Israel
silver medal	Letsile Tebogo	Botswana
bronze medal	Calab Law	Australia

The men's 200 metres at the 2022 World Athletics U20 Championships was held at the Estadio Olímpico Pascual Guerrero in Cali, Colombia on 3 and 4 August 2022.

== Records ==
U20 standing records prior to the 2022 World Athletics U20 Championships were as follows:

Record	Athlete & Nationality	Mark	Location	Date
World U20 Record	Erriyon Knighton (USA)	19.69	Eugene, United States	26 June 2022
Championship Record	Michael Norman (USA)	20.17	Bydgoszcz, Poland	22 July 2016
World U20 Leading	Erriyon Knighton (USA)	19.49	Baton Rouge, United States	30 April 2022

== Results ==
=== Round 1 ===
Round 1 took place on 3 August, with the 55 athletes involved being split into 7 heats, 6 heats of 8 and 1 of 7 athletes. The first 3 athletes in each heat ( Q ) and the next 3 fastest ( q ) qualified to the semi-final. The overall results were as follows:

Wind:
Heat 1: -1.4 m/s, Heat 2: +0.4 m/s, Heat 3: +1.0 m/s, Heat 4: -1.5 m/s, Heat 5: -0.3 m/s, Heat 6: -0.8 m/s, Heat 7: +0.1 m/s

Rank	Heat	Name	Nationality	Time	Note
1	2	Letsile Tebogo	Botswana	19.99	Q, CR
2	5	Blessing Afrifah	Israel	20.37	Q, NU20R
3	5	Juriel Quainoo	United Kingdom	20.56	Q
4	4	Puripol Boonson	Thailand	20.68	Q
5	7	Calab Law	Australia	20.72	Q
6	4	Bradley Olifant	South Africa	20.73	Q, PB
7	6	Benjamin Richardson	South Africa	20.74	Q
8	7	Brandon Miller	United States	20.79	Q
9	3	Muhd Azeem Fahmi	Malaysia	20.83 [.822]	Q, NU20R
10	2	Renan Correa	Brazil	20.83 [.825]	Q, PB
11	3	Aidan Murphy	Australia	20.85 [.841]	Q
12	3	Bryan Levell	Jamaica	20.85 [.842]	Q
13	4	Nazzio John	Grenada	20.93	Q, SB
14	5	Adekalu Fakorede	Nigeria	20.94	Q
15	6	Anthony Smith	Turkey	20.96	Q, NU20R
16	3	José Rodríguez	Mexico	21.00	q, PB
17	7	Óscar Baltán	Colombia	21.02	Q, PB
18	1	Erik Erlandsson	Sweden	21.06	Q
19	2	Kakene Sitali	Zambia	21.07 [.068]	Q, PB
20	3	Thawatchai Himaiad	Thailand	21.07 [.070]	q, PB
21	7	Roko Farkaš	Croatia	21.08	q, PB
22	5	Tomás Mondino	Argentina	21.15	PB
23	4	Tobias Morawietz	Germany	21.17	
24	5	Lundi Pinaemang	Botswana	21.19	PB
25	7	Denzel Simusialela	Zimbabwe	21.21 [.202]	
26	6	José Figueroa	Puerto Rico	21.21 [.204]	Q
27	7	Silviu-Daniel Munteanu	Romania	21.24 [.231]	PB
28	1	Loris Tonella	Italy	21.24 [.238]	Q
29	2	Shakeem McKay	Trinidad and Tobago	21.30 [.295]	
30	2	Wanyae Belle	British Virgin Islands	21.30 [.299]	PB
31	6	Kenny Tijani-Ajayi	Norway	21.31 [.551]	
32	1	Wanya McCoy	Bahamas	21.38	Q
33	6	Daniel Kidd	Canada	21.40 [.392]	
34	4	Jørgen Evensen Lund	Norway	21.40 [.400]	
35	3	Revell Webster	Trinidad and Tobago	21.42 [.412]	
36	3	Jernej Gumilar	Slovenia	21.42 [.420]	
37	7	Jakub Nemec	Slovakia	21.52	
38	2	Jaiden Reid	Cayman Islands	21.53	
39	1	Niko Kangasoja	Finland	21.56	
40	6	Ogheneovo Mabilo	Nigeria	21.63	
41	1	Devonric Mack	Saint Vincent and the Grenadines	21.72	
42	1	Jonathan Padilla	Mexico	21.76	
43	5	Alejandro Ricketts	Croatia	21.84	
44	4	Adem Benyache	Algeria	21.97	
45	5	Abdellah Ouhib	Algeria	22.02	
46	5	Jerrold Alexis	Seychelles	22.36	PB
47	3	Diego González	Puerto Rico	27.83	
48	2	Almond Small	Canada	1:15.51	
	6	Bautista Diamante	Argentina	DNS	
	6	Izaias Alves	Brazil	DNS	
	1	Emmanuel Rwotomiya	Uganda	DNS	
	1	Laurenz Colber	Germany	DNS	
	4	Sandrey Davison	Jamaica	DNS	
	7	Shunki Tateno	Japan	DNS	
	2	Sisínio Ambriz	Portugal	DNS	

=== Semi-final ===
The semi-final took place on 4 August, with the 24 athletes involved being split into 3 heats of 8 athletes each. The first 2 athletes in each heat ( Q ) and the next 2 fastest ( q ) qualified to the final. The overall results were as follows:

Wind:
Heat 1: -0.2 m/s, Heat 2: -1.2 m/s, Heat 3: +0.1 m/s

Rank	Heat	Name	Nationality	Time	Note
1	2	Blessing Afrifah	Israel	20.17	Q, NU20R
2	3	Letsile Tebogo	Botswana	20.23	Q
3	1	Bryan Levell	Jamaica	20.34	Q, PB
4	2	Benjamin Richardson	South Africa	20.39	Q
5	1	Calab Law	Australia	20.42	Q, PB
6	3	Jeriel Quainoo	Great Britain	20.43	q
7	1	Brandon Miller	United States	20.57 [.285]	q
8	2	Puripol Boonson	Thailand	20.61 [.285]	
9	2	Bradley Olifant	South Africa	20.75 [.291]	
10	2	Anthony Smith	Turkey	20.83 [.292]	Q, NU20R
11	3	Aidan Murphy	Australia	20.84 [.309]	
12	3	Adekalu Fakorede	Nigeria	20.93 [.309]	
13	2	José Figueroa	Puerto Rico	20.94	PB
14	1	Loris Tonella	Italy	20.95	PB
15	1	Muhd Azeem Fahmi	Malaysia	20.97	
16	1	Renan Correa	Brazil	20.98	
17	3	Erik Erlandsson	Sweden	21.03	
18	2	Óscar Baltán	Colombia	21.05	
19	1	José Rodríguez	Mexico	21.13 [.447]	
20	3	Wanya McCoy	Bahamas	21.23	
21	3	Roko Farkaš	Croatia	21.30	
22	3	Kakene Sitali	Zambia	21.30	
23	1	Thawatchai Himaiad	Thailand	21.86	
24	2	Nazzio John	Grenada	26.38	

=== Final ===
The final was started at 18:00 on 4 August. The results were as follows:

Wind: -1.0 m/s

Rank	Lane	Name	Nationality	Time	Note
1st place, gold medalist(s)	5	Blessing Afrifah	Israel	19.96 [.954]	CR
2nd place, silver medalist(s)	4	Letsile Tebogo	Botswana	19.96 [.960]	CR
3rd place, bronze medalist(s)	7	Calab Law	Australia	20.48	
4	6	Benjamin Richardson	South Africa	20.55	
5	1	Brandon Miller	United States	20.64	
6	3	Bryan Levell	Jamaica	20.72	
7	2	Jerel Quainoo	Great Britain	20.73	
8	8	Anthony Smith	Turkey	20.87	
