= Lachlan Kennedy (sprinter) =

Australian athlete (born 2003)

Personal information
- Nationality: Australian
- Born: 4 November 2003 (age 23) Lambeth, London, England

Sport
- Sport: Track and Field
- Event: Sprinting

Achievements and titles
- Personal bests: 60 m: 6.43 (2025) AR; 100 m: 9.85 (2026) AR; 200 m: 20.26 (2025)
Medal record
Men's athletics
Representing Australia
World Indoor Championships
Silver medal – second place	2025 Nanjing	60 metres
Commonwealth Games
Gold medal – first place	2026 Glasgow	4×100m relay
Silver medal – second place	2026 Glasgow	100 m
Pacific Games
Silver medal – second place	2023 Honiara	100 metres

Lachlan Kennedy (born 4 November 2003) is an Australian sprinter. He is the Oceanian record holder for the 60 metres and 100 metres. He won the 60 metres silver medal at the 2025 World Indoor Championships and the silver medal over 100 metres at the 2026 Commonwealth Games. He was the first Australian man to break the 10-second barrier on Australian soil.

== Early life ==
Kennedy was born in London, England, but moved to the southside of Brisbane at a young age. He attended St Joseph's College, Gregory Terrace throughout his upbringing. He played for Brisbane junior rugby union representative sides and played junior international rugby union for Australia before switching his focus to athletics at the age of 17. As of early 2026, he trains at Griffith University's High Performance Hub on the Gold Coast and is a member of the Griffith Sports College program.

== Career ==
Kennedy was a member of the Australian U20 4 x 100 metres relay team which broke the 12-year-old Australian U20 4 × 100 m relay record in 2022 in a time of 39.30 seconds. He represented Australia at the 2022 World Athletics U20 Championships in Cali, Colombia. In November 2023, he won the silver medal over 100 metres at the 2023 Pacific Games in Honiara behind compatriot Calab Law.

Kennedy was a member of Australia's 4 × 100 m team that set a new Oceania record of 38.12 seconds at the 2024 Summer Olympic Games.

=== 2025 ===
On 25 January 2025, in Canberra, he equalled the Australian record for 60 metres running a time of 6.52 seconds, and then, later in the day, ran 6.43 seconds (+1.6) to set new senior Australian and Oceania records, moving to equal tenth on the world all-time list. On 26 January 2025, Kennedy set a new 100m PB with 10.17 s running into a -1.0 m/s wind. At the 2025 Australian short-track championships, in Sydney in February, Kennedy won the 60 metres in a time of 6.51 seconds. On 1 March 2025, he ran 10.03 seconds (+1.1) to win the Perth Classic 100m, moving to equal third on the Australian all-time list alongside Matt Shirvington.

Kennedy represented Australia in the 60 metres at the 2025 World Athletics Indoor Championships held on 21 March in Nanjing, China. He qualified for the semi-finals with a run of 6.52 seconds. In the final, he ran 6.50 seconds to win the silver medal, one hundredth of a second behind the winner, Jeremiah Azu of Great Britain.

Kennedy won the 200 metres race in a personal best 20.26 seconds at the Maurie Plant Meet in Melbourne on 29 March 2025, ahead of compatriot Gout Gout. Kennedy lowered his personal best to 10.00 seconds for the 100 metres during the heats of the Australian Athletics Championships in Perth on 11 April 2025. He finished runner-up in the final in a time of 10.01 seconds, five thousandths of a second behind winner Rohan Browning, who was also credited with 10.01. In April, Kennedy finished fifth in the 100 metres in 10.18 seconds at the 2025 Xiamen Diamond League event in China. He competed for Australia at the 2025 World Athletics Relays in China, helping the Australian men's 4 × 100 m team qualify for the 2025 World Championships. He ran a new personal best of 9.98 seconds to win the 100 metres at the Kip Keino Classic in Nairobi, Kenya, on 31 May 2025.

=== 2026 ===
Having had the second half of 2025 ruled out by injury, Kennedy returned to competitive action with a win over 200 metres in February 2026 at the Hobart Track Classic, running a meet record 20.43 seconds (+0.6). Kennedy also set a meet record winning the 100 m in 10.03 seconds (+0.3) at the Maurie Plant Meet in Melbourne on 28 March 2026, surpassing the previous record set by Asafa Powell in 2008. Kennedy returned later to win the 200 metres at the meeting in 20.38 (-0.7) ahead of Gout Gout despite rainy conditions. On 10 April, competing in the 100 metres heats of the 2026 Australian Championships in Sydney, Kennedy improved his personal best with a legal-wind run of 9.96 (+0.2) to become the first Australian sprinter to break the 10-second barrier on home soil. He ran 9.96 (+0.5) again to win the final the following day.

Representing Australia at the 2026 World Athletics Relays in Botswana in May, he ran alongside Joshua Azzopardi, Christopher Ius and Rohan Browning to equal the 4 × 100 m Oceania record of 37.87 seconds on the opening day, before placing fourth overall in 38.00 in the final. Kennedy placed fifth in 10.01 seconds (+0.6) over 100 metres at the 2026 Shanghai Diamond League.

Competing at the 2026 Commonwealth Games in Glasgow, Scotland, on 28 July, Kennedy ran his 100 metres semi-final in 9.94 seconds, before returning that evening to lower the Oceanian area record in the men's 100 metres final to 9.85 seconds, placing second to achieve the silver medal. His time beat the previous record of 9.93 seconds set by Patrick Johnson in 2003. In doing so, Kennedy became the first Australian man to medal at a Commonwealth Games in the dash since Michael Cleary in 1962. He was also finalist in the 200 metres at the 200 metres at the Games placing sixth overall. Later at the games, he won the gold medal in the men's 4 × 100 m relay. At the 2026 Diamond League Final in Brussels in September, he ran 9.99 seconds to place fourth over 100 metres. Later that month, he competed over 100 m at the inaugural World Ultimate Championship in Budapest.

== Personal life ==
In 2018, Kennedy was diagnosed with type 1 diabetes. He commenced tertiary studies in Engineering and Design at the University of Queensland.

As of 2026, Kennedy is studying a Bachelor of Engineering and Bachelor of Business at Griffith University. In the same year, he was awarded a $40,000 Australian Olympic Committee and Griffith University Sports Scholarship, which supports elite athletes balancing high‑performance sport with tertiary studies and provides automatic entry into Griffith Sports College.
