= List of Australian records in athletics =

Below is a list of current Australian records in athletics as ratified by the national governing body, Australian Athletics. There are two types of Australian records in athletics. An "Australian record" is the best time recorded anywhere in the world by an athlete or team holding Australian citizenship, whilst an "Australian All Comers record" is the best time recorded in Australia by an athlete or team.

== Outdoor ==
Key to tables: Awaiting ratification Record not kept by Australian Athletics Not ratified or later rescinded by Australian Athletics

=== Men ===
Event	Record	Athlete	Date	Meet	Place	Ref.	Video
60 m	6.43 (+1.6 m/s)	Lachlan Kennedy	25 January 2025	ACT Open Championships	Canberra, Australia		
100 y	9.2 h	Bob Lay	10 March 1965		Sydney, Australia		
100 y	9.36+ (−0.2 m/s)	Rohan Browning	11 March 2023	Sydney Track Classic	Sydney, Australia		
100 m	9.85 (+1.3 m/s)	Lachlan Kennedy	28 July 2026	Commonwealth Games	Glasgow, Scotland		
150 m (bend)	14.96 (+0.0 m/s)	Gout Gout	16 June 2026	65th Ostrava Golden Spike	Ostrava, Czech Republic		
200 m	19.67 (+1.7 m/s)	Gout Gout	12 April 2026	Australian Championships	Sydney, Australia		
300 m	31.88	Darren Clark	30 June 1986		Belfast, Northern Ireland		
400 m	44.38	Darren Clark	26 September 1988	Olympic Games	Seoul, South Korea		
600 m	1:15.14	Lachlan Renshaw	20 February 2010		Sydney, Australia		
800 m	1:42.55	Peter Bol	11 July 2025	Herculis	Fontvieille, Monaco		
1000 m	2:15.13	Peter Bol	16 June 2026	65th Ostrava Golden Spike	Ostrava, Czech Republic		
1500 m	3:28.00	Cameron Myers	28 June 2026	Meeting de Paris	Paris, France		
Mile	3:46.06	Cameron Myers	4 July 2026	Prefontaine Classic	Eugene, United States		
Mile (road)	3:53.65	Oliver Hoare	19 September 2026	World Road Running Championships	Copenhagen, Denmark		
2000 m	4:48.77	Stewart McSweyn	8 September 2023	Memorial Van Damme	Brussels, Belgium		
3000 m	7:28.02	Stewart McSweyn	17 September 2020	Golden Gala	Rome, Italy		
Two miles	8:03.50	Craig Mottram	10 June 2007	Prefontaine Classic	Eugene, United States		
5000 m	12:50.82	Ky Robinson	10 June 2026	Bislett Games	Oslo, Norway		
5 km (road)	13:04	Ky Robinson	19 September 2026	World Road Running Championships	Copenhagen, Denmark		
10,000 m	26:57.07	Ky Robinson	28 March 2026	The TEN	San Juan Capistrano, United States		
10 km (road)	27:34	Sam Clifford	3 May 2025	Tokyo : Speed : Race	Tokyo, Japan		
15 km (road)	42:34+	Jack Rayner	15 February 2026	Barcelona Half Marathon	Barcelona, Spain		
20,000 m (track)	58:37.2+ h	Rob de Castella	17 April 1982		Rome, Italy		
20 km (road)	56:52+	Jack Rayner	15 February 2026	Barcelona Half Marathon	Barcelona, Spain		
One hour	20516 m	Robert de Castella	17 April 1982		Rome, Italy		
Half marathon	59:53	Jack Rayner	15 February 2026	Barcelona Half Marathon	Barcelona, Spain		
25,000 m (track)	1:19:56.4+	Josh Harris	31 July 2016	Australian Record Attempt	Hobart, Australia		
25 km (road)	1:14:36+	Andy Buchanan	1 December 2024	Valencia Marathon	Valencia, Spain		
30,000 m (track)	1:36:39.7	Josh Harris	31 July 2016	Australian Record Attempt	Hobart, Australia		
30 km (road)	1:29:34+	Andy Buchanan	1 December 2024	Valencia Marathon	Valencia, Spain		
Marathon	2:06:20	Haftu Strintzos	5 July 2026	Gold Coast Marathon	Gold Coast, Australia		
100 km	6:29:26 a	Tim Sloan	23 April 1995		Ross-Richmond, Australia		
24 hours	303506 m	Yiannis Kouros	24 October 1997	Sri Chinmoy 24 Hour Race	Kensington, Australia		
110 m hurdles	13.29 (+0.6 m/s)	Kyle Vander-Kuyp	11 August 1995	World Championships	Gothenburg, Sweden		
200 m hurdles	22.59 (+0.2 m/s)	Darryl Wohlsen	14 March 1996		Brisbane, Australia		
400 m hurdles	48.28	Rohan Robinson	31 July 1996	Olympic Games	Atlanta, United States		
3000 m steeplechase	8:16.22	Shaun Creighton	2 July 1993		Lille, France		
High jump	2.36 m	Tim Forsyth	2 March 1997	Melbourne Track Classic	Melbourne, Australia		
High jump	2.36 m	Brandon Starc	26 August 2018	Internationales Hochsprung-Meeting	Eberstadt, Germany		
Pole vault	6.05 m (Note: outdoor best; indoor mark ratified as absolute record)	Dmitri Markov	9 August 2001	World Championships	Edmonton, Canada		
Long jump	8.54 m (+1.7 m/s)	Mitchell Watt	29 July 2011	DN Galan	Stockholm, Sweden		
Triple jump	17.46 m (+1.7 m/s)	Ken Lorraway	7 August 1982		London, United Kingdom		
Shot put	21.35 m	Damien Birkinhead	28 August 2017	Hanžeković Memorial	Zagreb, Croatia		
Discus throw	74.78 m	Matthew Denny	13 April 2025	Oklahoma Throws Series World Invitational	Ramona, United States		
Hammer throw	79.29 m	Stuart Rendell	6 July 2002		Varaždin, Croatia		
Javelin throw	89.02 m	Jarrod Bannister	29 February 2008		Brisbane, Australia		
Decathlon	8649 pts	Ashley Moloney	4–5 August 2021	Olympic Games	Tokyo, Japan		
Decathlon	100m (wind) / Long jump (wind) / Shot put / High jump / 400m / 110m H (wind) / Discus / Pole vault / Javelin / 1500m; 10.34 (+0.2 m/s) / 7.64 m (+0.4 m/s) / 14.49 m / 2.11 m / 46.29 / 14.08 (−1.0 m/s) / 44.38 m / 5.00 m / 57.12 m / 4:39.19						
3000 m walk (track)	10:54.70	Dane Bird-Smith	11 February 2017	QA Norma Croker Shield	Brisbane, Australia		
5000 m walk (track)	18:12.52	Declan Tingay	5 March 2023	Victorian Open Championships	Melbourne, Australia		
10,000 m walk (track)	38:02.68	Isaac Beacroft	11 December 2025	New South Wales 10000m Walk Championships	Sydney, Australia		
10 km walk (road)	38:07	David Smith	25 September 1986		Sydney, Australia		
20,000 m walk (track)	1:19:48.1	Nathan Deakes	4 September 2001	Goodwill Games	Brisbane, Australia		
20 km walk (road)	1:17:33	Nathan Deakes	23 April 2005		Cixi City, China		
Half Marathon walk (road)	1:23:41	Declan Tingay	1 March 2026	Chinese Race Walking Grand Prix	Taicang, China		
30,000 m walk (track)	2:14:22+	Simon Baker	9 September 1990	Victorian Championships	Melbourne, Australia		
30 km walk (road)	2:03:15+	Rhydian Cowley	16 March 2025	Asian Race Walking Championships	Nomi, Japan		
35 km walk (road)	2:25:21	Rhydian Cowley	16 March 2025	Asian Race Walking Championships	Nomi, Japan		
Two hours walk (track)	27123.35 m	Willi Sawall	24 May 1980		Melbourne, Australia		
Marathon walk (road)	3:03:49	Rhydian Cowley	25 October 2026	All Japan Race Walking competition Takahata	Takahata, Japan		
50,000 m walk (track)	3:43:50.0	Simon Baker	9 September 1990	Victorian Championships	Hobart, Australia		
50 km walk (road)	3:35:47	Nathan Deakes	2 December 2006		Geelong, Australia		
4 × 100 m relay	37.87	Australia; Lachlan Kennedy; Joshua Azzopardi; Christopher Ius; Calab Law	15 March 2025	Sydney Track Classic	Sydney, Australia		
4 × 100 m relay	37.87	Australia; Lachlan Kennedy; Joshua Azzopardi; Christopher Ius; Rohan Browning	2 May 2026	World Athletics Relays	Gaborone, Botswana		
4 × 200 m relay	1:23.04	Australia; Scott Vassella; Shem Hollands; Dean Capobianco; Peter Vassella	6 December 1998		Sydney, Australia		
4 × 400 m relay	2:55.20	Australia; Luke van Ratingen; Reece Holder; Tom Reynolds; Aidan Murphy	3 May 2026	World Athletics Relays	Gaborone, Botswana		
4 × 800 m relay	7:11.48	Australia; Josh Ralph; Ryan Gregson; Jordan Willamsz; Jared West	24 May 2014	IAAF World Relays	Nassau, Bahamas		
Distance medley relay	9:17.56	Ryan Gregson 2:48.66 (1200m); Sean Wroe 45.96 (400m); Lachlan Renshaw 1:46.29 (800m); Jeff Riseley 3:56.66 (1600 m)	30 April 2011	Penn Relays	Philadelphia, United States		
4 × 1500 m relay	14:46.04	Australia; Ryan Gregson; Sam McEntee; Collis Birmingham; Jordan Willamsz	25 May 2014	IAAF World Relays	Nassau, Bahamas		
Marathon road relay (Ekiden)	2:03:13	Australia; Collis Birmingham (13:33); Lee Troop (28:50); Michael Shelley (14:08); Brett Cartwright (30:12); Liam Adams (14:56); Martin Dent (21:34)	23 November 2006	International Chiba Ekiden	Chiba, Japan		

=== Women ===
Event	Record	Athlete	Date	Meet	Place	Ref.
60 m	7.16 (+1.3 m/s)	Ella Connolly	1 February 2025	(The Inaugural) Australia Short Track Championships	Sydney, Australia	
60 m	7.16 (+0.7 m/s)	Sally Pearson	25 June 2011	Gold Coast Winter Series	Gold Coast, Australia	
100 y	10.2 h	Diane Holden	19 February 1986		Sydney, Australia	
100 y	10.34+ (+0.5 m/s)	Torrie Lewis	11 March 2023	Sydney Track Classic	Sydney, Australia	
100 m	10.99 (+1.0 m/s)	Torrie Lewis	28 July 2026	Commonwealth Games	Glasgow, Scotland	
150 m (straight)	16.86 (+0.9 m/s)	Sally Pearson	18 September 2010	Great City Games	Newcastle, United Kingdom	
150 m (bend)	17.37 NWI	Riley Day	4 February 2017	Nitro Athletics Round 1	Melbourne, Australia	
150 m (bend)	16.8 h NWI	Barbara Wilson	1976			
150 m (bend)	16.8 h NWI	Denise Robertson	1976			
200 m	22.23 (+0.8 m/s)	Melinda Gainsford-Taylor	13 July 1997		Stuttgart, Germany	
300 m	36.34	Jana Pittman	15 February 2003	Telstra A-Series	Campbelltown, Australia	
400 m	48.63	Cathy Freeman	29 July 1996	Olympic Games	Atlanta, United States	
600 m	1:25.79	Tamsyn Manou	5 July 2012	Meeting de la Province de Liège	Liège, Belgium	
800 m	1:57.01	Sarah Billings	28 June 2026	Meeting de Paris	Paris, France	
1000 m	2:30.96	Jessica Hull	11 July 2025	Herculis	Fontvieille, Monaco	
1500 m	3:50.83	Jessica Hull	7 July 2024	Meeting de Paris	Paris, France	
Mile	4:13.68	Jessica Hull	19 July 2025	London Athletics Meet	London, United Kingdom	
Mile (road)	4:26.4 h Wo	Jaylah Hancock-Cameron	25 April 2026	Ballarat Road Races - Australian Road Mile Championships	Ballarat, Australia	
2000 m	5:19.70	Jessica Hull	12 July 2024	Herculis	Fontvieille, Monaco	
3000 m	8:24.20	Georgia Griffith	30 May 2024	Bislett Games	Oslo, Norway	
Two miles	9:43.53	Georgie Clarke	20 May 2007	Adidas Track Classic	Carson, United States	
5000 m	14:31.45	Rose Davies	19 July 2025	London Athletics Meet	London, United Kingdom	
5 km (road)	14:50 Wo	Rose Davies	19 September 2026	World Road Running Championships	Copenhagen, Denmark	
10,000 m	30:34.11	Rose Davies	11 June 2025	Bislett Games	Oslo, Norway	
10 km (road)	30:44	Isobel Batt-Doyle	3 May 2025	Tokyo : Speed : Race	Tokyo, Japan	
15 km (road)	47:59+	Kerryn McCann	10 January 2000		Tokyo, Japan	
One hour	16056 m +	Jackie Fairweather	24 January 2008		Canberra, Australia	
20 km (road)	1:04:36+ a	Benita Johnson	26 September 2004		Newcastle-South Shields, United Kingdom	
20 km (road)	1:05:02.6+	Benita Johnson	1 April 2007	Berlin Half Marathon	Berlin, Germany	
Half marathon	1:07:17 Mx	Isobel Batt-Doyle	1 February 2025	Kagawa Marugame Half Marathon	Marugame, Japan	
Half marathon	1:09:26 Wo	Benita Johnson	4 October 2003	2003 World Half Marathon Championships	Vilamoura, Portugal	
25 km (road)	1:23:25+ Mx	Benita Johnson	22 October 2006	Chicago Marathon	Chicago, United States	
25 km (road)	1:23:25+ Mx	Isobel Batt-Doyle	11 October 2026	Chicago Marathon	Chicago, United States	
30 km (road)	1:40:12+	Benita Johnson	22 October 2006	Chicago Marathon	Chicago, United States	
30 km (road)	1:40:08+ Mx	Isobel Batt-Doyle	11 October 2026	Chicago Marathon	Chicago, United States	
Marathon	2:21:24	Jessica Stenson	7 December 2025	Valencia Marathon	Valencia, Spain	
Marathon	2:20:38 Mx	Isobel Batt-Doyle	11 October 2026	Chicago Marathon	Chicago, United States	
50 Miles (track)	6:07:58	Linda Meadows	18 June 1994	50 Mile Track Race Burwood	Burwood, Australia	
100 km	7:34:25	Kirstin Bull	27 November 2016	IAU 100 km World Championships	Los Alcázares, Spain	
24 hours (road)	274.172 km	Holly Ranson	19 October 2025	IAU 24 Hour World Championship	Albi, France	
100 m hurdles	12.28 (+1.1 m/s)	Sally Pearson	3 September 2011	World Championships	Daegu, South Korea	
200 m hurdles (bend)	25.7 h	Pam Kilborn-Ryan	25 November 1971		Melbourne, Australia	
200 m hurdles (bend)	25.79 (−0.6 m/s)	Lauren Wells	21 January 2017	Athletics ACT Combined Events Championships	Canberra, Australia	
300 m hurdles	39.00	Jana Pittman	11 July 2004		Meilen, Switzerland	
400 m hurdles	53.17	Debbie Flintoff-King	28 September 1988	Olympic Games	Seoul, South Korea	
2000m steeplechase	6:09.48	Genevieve Gregson	1 September 2019	ISTAF Berlin	Berlin, Germany	
3000 m steeplechase	9:14.28	Genevieve LaCaze	27 August 2016	Meeting Areva	Saint-Denis, France	
High jump	2.04 m	Nicola Olyslagers	27 August 2025	Weltklasse Zürich	Zurich, Switzerland	
Pole vault	4.95 m	Nina Kennedy	10 July 2026	Herculis	Fontvieille, Monaco	
Long jump	7.13 m (+1.8 m/s)	Brooke Buschkuehl	9 July 2022	MVA High Performance #2	Chula Vista, United States	
Triple jump	14.04 m (+2.0 m/s)	Nicole Mladenis	9 March 2002		Hobart, Australia	
Triple jump	14.04 m (+1.8 m/s)	Nicole Mladenis	7 December 2003		Perth, Australia	
Shot put	19.74 m	Gael Martin	14 July 1984		Berkeley, United States	
Discus throw	69.64 m	Dani Stevens	13 August 2017	World Championships	London, United Kingdom	
Hammer throw	73.63 m	Stephanie Ratcliffe	8 June 2023	NCAA Division I Championships	Austin, United States	
Javelin throw	68.92 m	Kathryn Mitchell	11 April 2018	Commonwealth Games	Gold Coast, Australia	
Heptathlon	6695 pts	Jane Flemming	27–28 January 1990	Commonwealth Games	Auckland, New Zealand	
Heptathlon	100m H (wind) / High jump / Shot put / 200m (wind) / Long jump (wind) / Javelin / 800m; 13.21 (+1.4 m/s) / 1.82 m / 13.76 m / 23.62 (+2.4 m/s) / 6.57 m (+1.6 m/s) / 49.28 m / 2:12.53					
Decathlon	7900 pts	Camryn Newton-Smith	8–9 August 2026	Women's Decathlon World Championships	Geneva, United States	
Decathlon	100m (wind) / Discus / Pole vault / Javelin / 400m / 100m H (wind) / Long jump (wind) / Shot put / High jump / 1500m; 11.83 (+1.4 m/s) / 34.22 m / 3.50 m / 37.15 m / 55.41 / 13.61 (+0.3 m/s) / 6.17 m (+0.2 m/s) / 12.86 m / 1.75 m / 5:48.49					
3000 m walk (track)	11:51.26	Kerry Saxby-Junna	7 February 1991		Melbourne, Australia	
5000 m walk (track)	20:03.0 h	Kerry Saxby-Junna	11 February 1996		Sydney, Australia	
5 km walk (road)	20:25	Kerry Saxby	10 June 1989	Internationaler Geher-Cup	Hildesheim, West Germany	
10,000 m walk (track)	41:57.22	Kerry Saxby-Junna	24 July 1990		Seattle, United States	
10 km walk (road)	41:29.71	Kerry Saxby-Junna	27 August 1988		Canberra, Australia	
20,000 m walk (track)	1:33:40.2	Kerry Saxby-Junna	6 September 2001		Brisbane, Australia	
20 km walk (road)	1:26:25	Jemima Montag	1 August 2024	Olympic Games	Paris, France	
Half Marathon walk (road)	1:31:31	Elizabeth McMillen	25 October 2026	All Japan Race Walking competition Takahata	Takahata, Japan	
30 km walk (road)	2:19:12+ (Note: Split time recorded at the distance of 30.195 km)	Rebecca Henderson	25 October 2026	All Japan Race Walking competition Takahata	Takahata, Japan	
35 km walk (road)	2:42:40	Olivia Sandery	16 March 2025	World Athletics Race Walking Tour	Nomi, Japan	
35 km walk (road)	2:42:10+ (Note: Split time recorded at the distance of 35.195 km)	Rebecca Henderson	25 October 2026	All Japan Race Walking competition Takahata	Takahata, Japan	
Marathon walk (road)	3:14:52	Rebecca Henderson	25 October 2026	All Japan Race Walking competition Takahata	Takahata, Japan	
50 km walk (road)	4:09:33	Claire Tallent	5 May 2018	IAAF World Race Walking Team Championships	Taicang, China	
Two hours walk (track)	23496.5 m	Simone Wolowiec	3 July 1999		Box Hill, Australia	
4 × 100 m relay	42.48	Australia; Ella Connolly; Bree Masters; Kristie Edwards; Torrie Lewis	20 July 2024	London Athletics Meet	London, United Kingdom	
4 × 200 m relay	1:32.6 h	Australia; Raelene Boyle; Sue Jowett; Denise Robertson; Barbara Wilson	25 January 1976		Brisbane, Australia	
4 × 400 m relay	3:23.81	Australia; Nova Peris-Kneebone; Tamsyn Manou; Melinda Gainsford-Taylor; Cathy Freeman	30 September 2000	Olympic Games	Sydney, Australia	
4 × 800 m relay	8:13.26	Australia; Brittany McGowan; Zoe Buckman; Selma Kajan; Melissa Duncan	25 May 2014	IAAF World Relays	Nassau, Bahamas	
Distance medley relay	10:46.94	Australia; Melissa Duncan (1200 m); Samantha Lind (400 m); Brittany McGowan (800 m); Heidi See (1600 m)	2 May 2015	IAAF World Relays	Nassau, Bahamas	
4 × 1500 m relay	17:08.65	Australia; Zoe Buckman; Bridey Delaney; Brittany McGowan; Melissa Duncan	24 May 2014	IAAF World Relays	Nassau, Bahamas	

=== Mixed ===
Event	Record	Athletes	Date	Meet	Place	Ref.
4 × 100 m relay	41.09	Australia; Calab Law; Zara Hagan; Christopher Ius; Torrie Lewis	28 June 2026	Meeting de Paris	Paris, France	
4 × 400 m relay	3:12.20	Australia; Luke van Ratingen; Ellie Beer; Terrell Thorne; Carla Bull	11 May 2025	World Relays	Guangzhou, China	

== Indoor ==
=== Men ===
Event	Record	Athlete	Date	Meet	Place	Ref.
50 m	5.8 h	Ian Campbell	18 February 1978		Daly City, United States	
55 m	6.34	Ian Campbell	7 February 1981		Moscow, United States	
60 m	6.50 (Note: indoor best; outdoor mark ratified as absolute record)	Lachlan Kennedy	21 March 2025	World Championships	Nanjing, China	
200 m	20.71	Damien Marsh	12 March 1993	World Championships	Toronto, Canada	
300 m	34.43 A	Nicholas Andrews	14 January 2022		Albuquerque, United States	
300 m	33.2 h OT	Rick Mitchell	26 July 1978		Moscow, United States	
300 m	34.1 h	Paul Narracott	26 July 1978		Moscow, United States	
300 m	33.1 h	Daniel Batman	2 March 2003		Birmingham, United States	
300 m	33.6 h	Daniel Batman	2 March 2003		Birmingham, United States	
300 m	33.8 h	Daniel Batman	2 March 2003		Birmingham, United States	
400 m	45.93	Daniel Batman	2 March 2003		Birmingham, United Kingdom	
400 m	45.44	Steven Solomon	23 February 2018	ACC Championships	Clemson, United States	
500 m	1:01.44	Steven Solomon	1 February 2014	Penn State Invitational	University Park, United States	
600 m	1:17.49	Steven Solomon	3 February 2018	Michigan Power 5 Invitational	Ann Arbor, United States	
800 m	1:45.14	Peter Bol	22 March 2026	World Championships	Toruń, Poland	
1000 m	2:16.95	Jack Anstey	10 February 2024	BU David Hemery Valentine Invitational	Boston, United States	
1500 m	3:32.35	Ollie Hoare	13 February 2021	New Balance Indoor Grand Prix	New York City, United States	
Mile	3:47.48	Cameron Myers	8 February 2025	Millrose Games	New York City, United States	
2000 m	5:24.30	Shaun Forrest	13 February 2009		Fayetteville, United States	
3000 m	7:27.57	Cameron Myers	24 January 2026	New Balance Indoor Grand Prix	Boston, United States	
Two miles	8:12.01	Morgan McDonald	11 February 2024	Millrose Games	New York City, United States	
5000 m	12:59.43	Jack Rayner	21 February 2025	BU Terrier DMR Challenge	Boston, United States	
60 m hurdles	7.56	Chris Douglas	20 March 2022	World Championships	Belgrade, Serbia	
High jump	2.33 m	Tim Forsyth	16 February 1997		Balingen, Germany	
Pole vault	6.06 m	Steven Hooker	7 February 2009	Boston Indoor Games	Boston, United States	
Long jump	8.25 m	Fabrice Lapierre	20 March 2016	World Championships	Portland, United States	
Triple jump	17.20 m	Andrew Murphy	9 March 2001	World Championships	Lisbon, Portugal	
Shot put	20.83 m	Scott Martin	7 March 2008	World Championships	Valencia, Spain	
Weight throw	22.25 m	Simon Wardhaugh	6 December 2008	Boise State Jacksons Open & Combined Events	Nampa, United States	
Discus throw	65.60 m	Benn Harradine	12 March 2011	4th World Indoor Throwing Competition	Växjö, Sweden	
Heptathlon	6344 pts	Ashley Moloney	18–19 March 2022	World Championships	Belgrade, Serbia	
Heptathlon	60m / Long jump / Shot put / High jump / 60m H / Pole vault / 1000m; 6.70 / 7.82 m / 13.89 m / 2.02 m / 7.88 / 5.10 m / 2:43.01					
3000 m walk	12:16.56	Lachlan McDonald	1 March 2002	NAIA Race Walking Championships	Johnson City, United States	
5000 m walk	18:52.20	David Smith	8 March 1987	World Championships	Indianapolis, United States	
4 × 200 m relay	1:33.25	Australia; Farlow; Little; McMahon; Jay Stone	30 March 2019	World Masters Championships	Toruń, Poland	
4 × 400 m relay	3:08.49	Australia; Paul Greene; Mark Garner; Rohan Robinson; Steve Perry	10 March 1991	World Championships	Seville, Spain	

=== Women ===
Event	Record	Athlete	Date	Meet	Place	Ref.	Video
50 m	6.3 h	Pam Kilborn	29 January 1965		Toronto, Canada		
50 m	6.24	Torrie Lewis	4 February 2025	Czech Indoor Gala	Ostrava, Czech Republic		
55 m	7.41	Kelly Humphries	8 February 2003		Fargo, United States		
60 m	7.14	Torrie Lewis	29 January 2025	Belgrade Indoor Meeting	Belgrade, Serbia		
200 m	22.64	Melinda Gainsford	10 March 1995	World Championships	Barcelona, Spain		
200 m	22.64	Melinda Gainsford	11 March 1995	World Championships	Barcelona, Spain		
300 m	38.73	Caitlin Sargent	25 January 2013		Blacksburg, United States		
400 m	52.17	Maree Holland	4 March 1989	World Championships	Budapest, Hungary		
500 m	1:17.86	Leticia Makin	14 February 2002		Boston, United States		
600 m	1:25.84	Erica Sigmont-Fountain	25 January 2003		Joplin, United States		
800 m	1:59.46	Catriona Bisset	19 February 2022	Birmingham Indoor Grand Prix	Birmingham, United Kingdom		
1000 m	2:38.45	Hayley Kitching	17 January 2026	Nittany Lion Challenge	State College, United States		
1000 m	2:34.71 OT	Jessica Hull	27 January 2024	UW Invitational	Seattle, United States		
1500 m	3:59.45	Jessica Hull	22 March 2026	World Championships	Toruń, Poland		
Mile	4:19.03	Jessica Hull	11 February 2024	Millrose Games	New York City, United States		
2000 m	5:26.68	Jessica Hull	19 February 2026	Meeting Hauts-de-France Pas-de-Calais	Liévin, France		
3000 m	8:24.39	Jessica Hull	2 March 2024	World Championships	Glasgow, United Kingdom		
Two miles	9:44.04	Krishna Wood	15 March 1987		Cosford, United Kingdom		
5000 m	14:58.43	Linden Hall	15 February 2025	BU David Hemery Valentine Invitational	Boston, United States		
5000 m	14:57.67 OT	Lauren Ryan	23 February 2024	Ken Shannon Last Chance	Seattle, United States		
55 m hurdles	7.72	Sharon Jaklofsky-Smith	4 March 1994		Baton Rouge, United States		
60 m hurdles	7.73	Sally Pearson	10 March 2012	World Championships	Istanbul, Turkey		
High jump	2.00 m	Eleanor Patterson	19 March 2022	World Championships	Belgrade, Serbia		
Pole vault	4.91 m	Nina Kennedy	30 August 2023	Weltklasse Zürich	Zürich, Switzerland		
Long jump	6.81 m	Nicole Boegman	12 March 1995	World Championships	Barcelona, Spain		
Triple jump	13.31 m	Nicole Mladenis	5 March 2004	World Championships	Budapest, Hungary		
Shot put	16.71 m	Gael Martin	January 1985		Paris, France		
Pentathlon	4490 pts	Jane Jamieson	5 March 1999	World Championships	Maebashi, Japan		
Pentathlon	60m H / High jump / Shot put / Long jump / 800m; 8.66 / 1.83 m / 13.94 m / 6.08 m / 2:19.64						
3000 m walk	11:53.82	Kerry Saxby	12 March 1993	World Championships	Toronto, Canada		
4 × 200 m relay	1:42.34 A	C. Mucci; J. Andrew; Boyle; M. Cairns	18 February 2017		Pocatello, United States		
4 × 400 m relay	3:26.87	Australia; Susan Andrews; Tania Van Heer; Tamsyn Manou; Cathy Freeman	7 March 1999	World Championships	Maebashi, Japan		
