= Duel in the Pool =

Swimming event

The Duel in the Pool is a swimming event that took place bi-annually from 2003 to 2015. In 2022, the event was reintroduced with an edition between the United States and Australia and co-organized by Swimming Australia and USA Swimming. From 2003 to 2015, the competition was organized by USA Swimming, and sponsored by Mutual of Omaha, the event was a made-for-television competition pitting the stars from the United States against another team, accumulating points across a series of individual and team-relay events. In between those times, the event has occurred regularly in major international meets from the Olympic Games to World Aquatics Championships.

The original concept (2003–2015) focused on the rivalry between the world's then two powerhouse swimming nations, Australia and the United States, who together would shutout all other nations for the top two spots of the medals tables at ever major all-nation competition for a decade, including the FINA World Championships (1998–2007) and the Summer Olympics (2000–2008).

The reintroduction concept (2022) expanded the event line-up from the original concept to include para swimming and open water swimming events.

Following three consecutive American victories (2003, 2005, 2007), where they averaged nearly double the points of the Australians, the Australians were replaced by an all-star team with members from various European nations. The Europeans did no better than the Australians, with the Americans winning all four of their meetings (2009, 2011, 2013, 2015), again averaging nearly double their opponents' scores in three of the events, and scoring a one-point victory — via a tie-breaker race — in 2013, the one competitive tournament in the series. After the 2015 event, a reporter noted the futility of the competition, stating: "The score was hardly relevant: by a whitewash – for a 7th consecutive win". In 2017, swimming news website SwimSwam claimed the event could never be held again, as USA Swimming was unable to renew a television sponsorship deal after 2015.

While reports in The Guardian and NBC Sports compared the later USA-vs-Europe versions of the Duel in the Pool to golf's USA-vs-Europe Ryder Cup, it was noted that a number of stars were missing from both swim teams, unlike the participation of the most elite golfers in the Ryder Cup.

== 2003–2007: United States vs. Australia ==
=== 2003 ===
At the inaugural event Mutual of Omaha/Fujitsu Duel in the Pool in Indianapolis, Indiana on April 6, 2003, the Americans overwhelmed the Australians, 196–74, winning 21 of the 26 events. This result set the stage for Team USA's dominant performance at both the 2003 World Championships and later the 2004 Olympics in Athens.

=== 2005 ===
On August 2, 2005, the United States captured victories in 18 of the 28 events in front of the sold-out crowd of 2,600 in Irvine, California. The US won 190–102, although the Australians rode a wave of talent on the women's side, outscoring the American women 76–70.

=== 2007 ===
The 2007 Duel in the Pool between the US and Australia took place in Sydney, Australia on April 3, 2007. The United States won their third straight Duel in the Pool, with a score of 181.5 points to Australia's 129.5.

During a mixed 4×100 metres freestyle relay, Australian Libby Lenton became the first woman to beat the 53 second mark swimming freestyle over a distance of 100 metres, beating the previous world record by 0.31 seconds with a time of 52.99. At the time, she was racing a relay-leg against American Michael Phelps, who clocked in at 48.72 seconds. However, mixed 4×100 metres freestyle relay was not an official event recognized by FINA, the world governing body for swimming, so her time was not ratified as a world record. It would be another seven years before the mixed 4×100 metres freestyle relay, along with the mixed 4×100 metres medley relay, were added to the list of official FINA events.

== 2009–2015: United States vs. Europe ==
=== 2009 ===
The event took place December 19–20, 2009 between the US and a combined British, German and Italian team swimming under the team name E-Stars in Manchester, England. The final score was a 185–78 victory for the US with eight world records set during the competition. This meet marked the last major competition where polyurethane suits were worn, with the required use of textile suits being reinstated January 1, 2010.

=== 2011 ===
The 2011 Duel in the Pool was held December 16–17, 2011, in Atlanta, using venues from the 1996 Olympic Games. The Americans defeated a European All-Star team from Great Britain, the Netherlands, Poland, Belarus, Denmark, Austria, Ireland, Lithuania and Hungary, 181.5-80.5.

=== 2013 ===
The 2013 Duel in the Pool was held December 20–21, 2013. Glasgow, Scotland served as host in advance of hosting the 2014 Commonwealth Games. Like previous editions since 2009, the competition took place in a short course pool. The US team defeated the European All-Stars in the closest meet of its history. Resulting in a tie between the two teams, they had to have a tie-breaker mixed 200 medley relay. The team of Eugene Godsoe, Kevin Cordes, Claire Donahue, and Simone Manuel beat the Europeans in a time of 1:31.17. The final score was 132–131.

=== 2015 ===
The 2015 Duel in the Pool was held December 12–13, 2015 at the Indiana University Natatorium in Indianapolis. The US defeated Europe for the fourth time in a row, with a score of 155–107. Two world records were broken; in the women's 4×100 m medley relay by the US team, and by American Matt Grevers in the 100 m backstroke. Ranomi Kromowidjojo of the Netherlands equaled her own world record in the 50 m freestyle. Also, 16 American records were broken.

== 2022: United States vs. Australia ==
=== 2022 ===
The 2022 Duel in the Pool took place between teams from the United States and Australia from August 19 to 21, 2022 in Sydney, Australia at the Sydney Olympic Park Aquatic Centre (pool and para swimming events) and Bondi Beach (open water swimming events).

== Results ==
Duel in the Pool matches
Year	Winners	Score	Runners-up	Host city	Venue
2003	United States	196–74	Australia	(United States) Indianapolis	Indiana University Natatorium
2005	United States	190–102	Australia	(United States) Irvine	William Woollett Jr. Aquatics Center
2007	United States	181.5–129.5	Australia	(Australia) Sydney	Sydney International Aquatic Centre
2009	United States	185–78	Europe	(United Kingdom) Manchester	Manchester Aquatics Centre
2011	United States	181.5–80.5	Europe	(United States) Atlanta	Georgia Tech Aquatic Center
2013	United States	132–131	Europe	(United Kingdom) Glasgow	Tollcross International Swimming Centre
2015	United States	155–107	Europe	(United States) Indianapolis	Indiana University Natatorium
2022	United States	309–284	Australia	(Australia) Sydney	Sydney Olympic Park Aquatic Centre, Bondi Beach

== See also ==
- Australia–United States sports rivalries
