= 2022 African Championships in Athletics – Men's 4 × 100 metres relay =

The men's 4 × 100 metres relay event at the 2022 African Championships in Athletics was held on 9 and 10 June in Port Louis, Mauritius.

== Medalists ==
Gold	Silver	Bronze
Kenya; Dan Asamba; Mike Nyang'au; Samwel Imeta; Ferdinand Omanyala	South Africa; Henricho Bruintjies; Antonio Alkana; Cheswill Johnson; Benjamin Richardson; Rivaldo Roberts*; Akani Simbine*	Zimbabwe; Ngoni Makusha; Dickson Kamungeremu; Tapiwa Makarawu; Denzel Siamsialela

*Athletes who competed in heats only

== Results ==
=== Heats ===
Qualification: First 3 teams of each heat (Q) plus the next 2 fastest (q) qualified for the final.

Rank	Heat	Nation	Athletes	Time	Notes
1	1	Botswana	Letsile Tebogo, Jayson Mandoze, Tumo Stagato Lesesere, Stephen Abosi	39.32	Q
2	2	Kenya	Dan Asamba, Mike Nyang'au, Samwel Imeta, Ferdinand Omanyala	39.42	Q
3	1	Zimbabwe	Ngoni Makusha, Denzel Siamsialela, Tapiwa Makarawu, Dickson Kamungeremu	39.75	Q
4	1	Nigeria	Ogheneovo Mabilo, Ogho-Oghene Egwero, Adekalu Fakorede, Raymond Ekevwo	40.15	Q
5	1	Mauritius	Jonathan Bardottier, Yash Aubeeluck, Jean Baptiste Nazira, Alvin Rughoodass	40.64	q
6	2	South Africa	Cheswill Johnson, Rivaldo Roberts, Akani Simbine, Henricho Bruintjies	40.99	Q
7	2	Eswatini	Sibusiso Matsenjwa, Mcebo Mkhaliphi, Benele Simphiwe Dlamini, Lwazi Menziwokuhle Msibi	41.25	Q
8	2	Democratic Republic of the Congo	Dominique Mulamba, Joel Tshikamba, Oliver Mwimba, Lionel Muteba	41.59	q
9	2	Gambia	Adama Jammeh, ?, ?, Sengan Jobe	41.93	
10	1	Ethiopia	Locho Kiyonga, Melkamu Assefa, Derese Tesfaye, Ahmed Musa	44.23	
	1	Seychelles		DNS	
	2	Burkina Faso		DNS	

=== Final ===
Rank	Lane	Nation	Competitors	Time	Notes
1st place, gold medalist(s)	6	Kenya	Dan Asamba, Mike Nyang'au, Samwel Imeta, Ferdinand Omanyala	39.28	NR
2nd place, silver medalist(s)	5	South Africa	Henricho Bruintjies, Antonio Alkana, Cheswill Johnson, Benjamin Richardson	39.79	
3rd place, bronze medalist(s)	3	Zimbabwe	Ngoni Makusha, Dickson Kamungeremu, Tapiwa Makarawu, Denzel Siamsialela	39.81	
4	7	Nigeria	Raymond Ekevwo, Nicholas Mabilo, Ogho-Oghene Egwero, Seye Ogunlewe	39.98	
5	1	Mauritius	Noa Bibi, Yash Aubeeluck, Jean Baptiste Nazira, Jeremie Lararaudeuse	40.14	
6	2	Democratic Republic of the Congo	Lionel Muteba, Dominique Mulamba, Joel Tshikamba, Oliver Mwimba	41.24	
7	8	Eswatini	Benele Simphiwe Dlamini, Lwazi Menziwokuhle Msibi, Ayanda Malaza, Mcebo Mkhaliphi	41.48	
	4	Botswana	Stephen Abosi, Letsile Tebogo, Jayson Mandoze, Tumo Stagato Lesesere	DQ	
