= Australia–United States sports rivalries =

Australia–United States relations
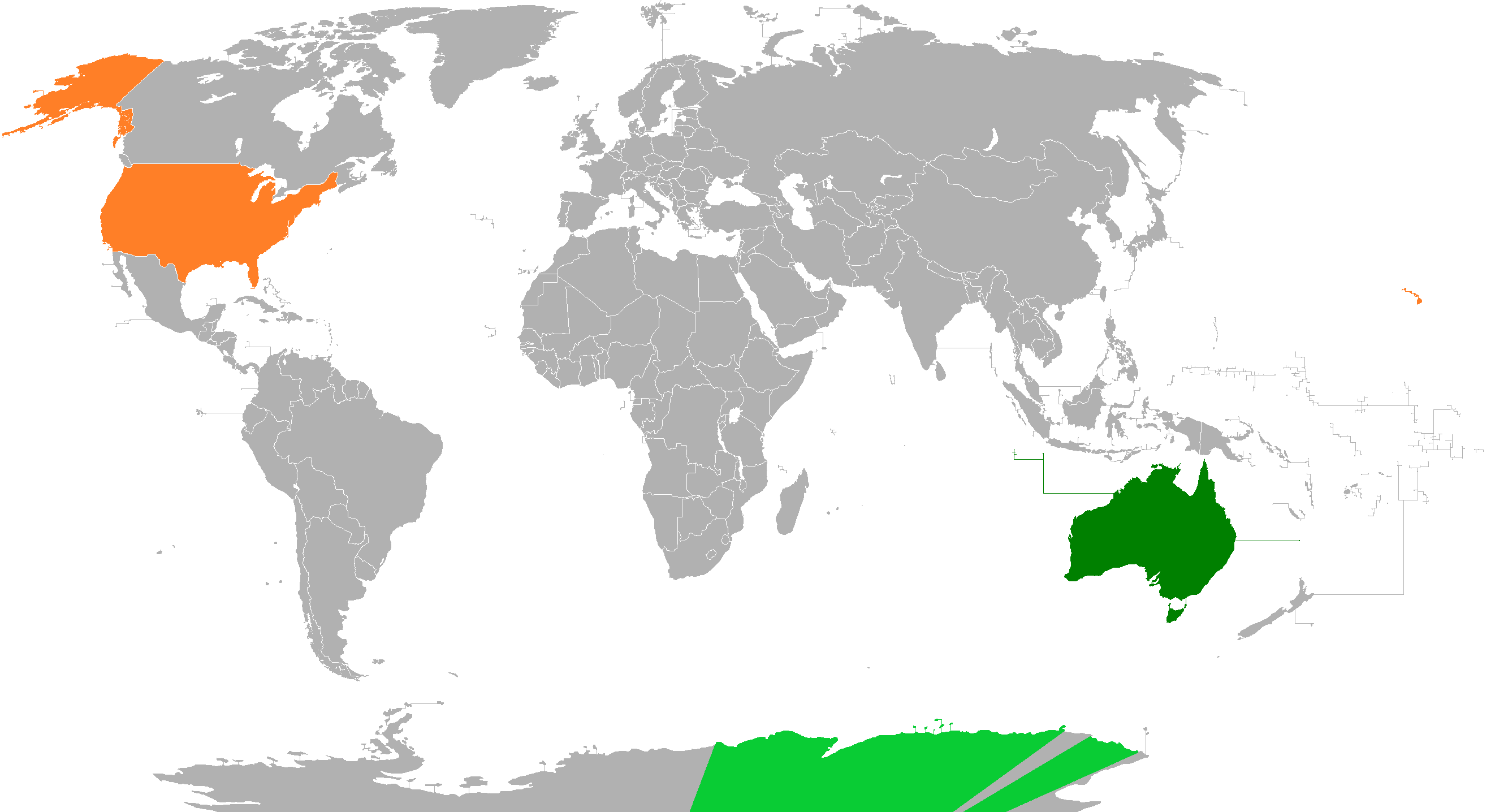

- Australia: United States

The Australia–United States sporting rivalry is one which spreads across multiple sports due to similar sporting cultures within the two countries. Despite the large difference in population, with the United States containing more than 10 times the inhabitants of Australia, many sports are tightly contested between the two nations at the highest level. The rivalry is mostly defined by good-natured banter and healthy competitiveness between the two nations with the Australian underdog spirit often punching well above its weight against an American sporting superpower, but it has occasionally spilled into more serious situations that have gone beyond the typically friendly relationship that has defined the rivalry in the past. The comments or actions that cross the line of good-humoured content are often used as bulletin board material by the opposition to build hype and motivation for an upcoming contest between the two nations.

Despite many sports being contested between the two nations, the US is better than Australia in almost all sports. All time, the United States is more successful than Australia in baseball, basketball, soccer, tennis, golf, swimming, track and field, lacrosse, ice hockey, boxing, volleyball, rowing, snowboarding, figure skating, gymnastics, sailing, cycling, weightlifting, wrestling, softball, canoeing, fencing, skiing, water polo, judo, diving, beach volleyball, archery, shooting, curling, bobsleigh, among others, while Australia is more successful than the US in cricket, rugby, netball and field hockey. The United States has won the Summer Olympic medal table 19 times and is ranked number 1 overall, while Australia has won the Summer Olympic medal table 0 times and is ranked number 10 overall. Australia is considered as the United States' "sporting little brother."

== Athletics ==
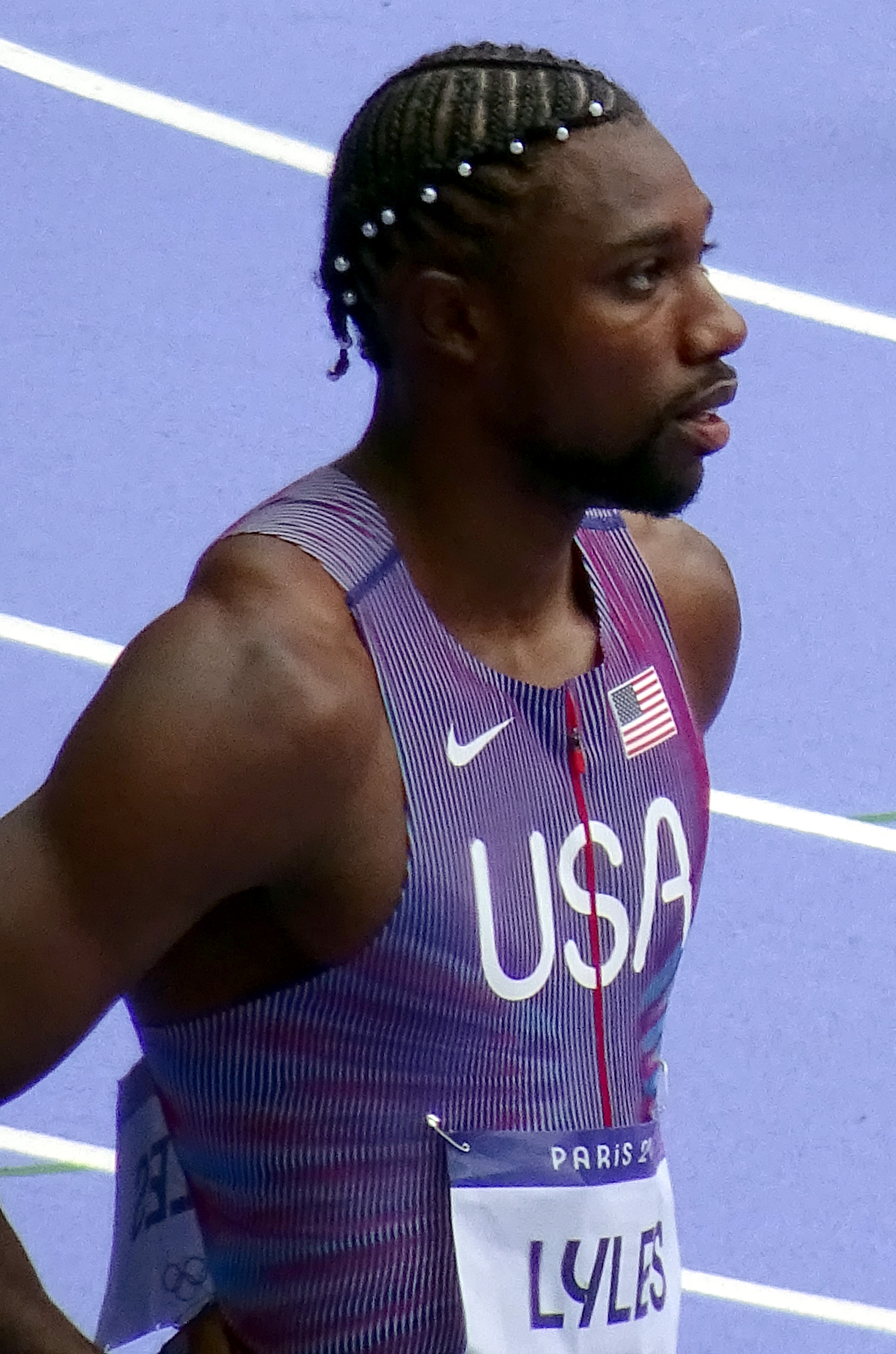
American sprinter Noah Lyles has developed a friendly rivalry with Australian sprint prodigy Gout Gout and it is anticipated that the two will clash in high-profile races at the 2028 Summer Olympics in Los Angeles.

After many decades of relative obscurity, international interest in Australian athletics rapidly increased with the emergence of prodigious 16 year old Australian sprinter Gout Gout in 2024 and it has led to both positive and negative media coverage in the United States as well as ensuing rivalries between Australians and Americans involved in athletics. In February 2025, then 17 year old Gout featured on a podcast with reigning 2024 Olympic 100m Gold Medalist Noah Lyles and confidently claimed "I am trying to show you what's up, I am trying to come out there with a bang" before boldly telling Lyles "I am coming for that spot." A smiling Lyles responded to Gout by stating "That's what I love to hear. I want you to come up to me and say 'Yeah, I am going to take your spot.'"

In 2025 and early 2026, two more Australian sprinters in Lachlan Kennedy and Eddie Nketia emerged as sub-10 second 100m runners and optimism began to build around Australia potentially being on the cusp of a golden generation of sprinters. This optimism culminates in the possibility of Australia competing against the best sprinting nations in the world, with anticipation growing for future Australia vs United States clashes as both nations will host the next two iterations of the Olympics in Los Angeles (2028) and Brisbane (2032). Kennedy became the first domestic sprinter to run sub-10 seconds on Australian soil when he ran 9.96 seconds in the 100m event at the 2025 Australian Athletics Championships. A month later he answered American critics and won the 100m final at the Kip Keino Classic in Nairobi, Kenya, with a time of 9.98 seconds.

In April 2026, an 18 year old Gout broke the under-20 200m world record with a time of 19.67 at the Australian Athletics Championships, which was questioned for its legitimacy by American commentators and criticised by former American sprinter and 2004 Olympic 100m gold medallist Justin Gatlin who claimed Gout was only running fast in Australia and not performing overseas. Gout shrugged off the criticism from American commentators and responded "There's always going to be haters. If there's haters, it means you are doing something right." Despite the questioning from American pundits, World Athletics ratified Gout's 200m under-20 world record in June 2026.

In May 2026, the Australian 4 × 100m men's relay team equaled their all-time record and finished fourth in the final of the 2026 World Athletics Relays without Gout Gout or Eddie Nketia in the team, which drew criticism from American commentators. Former American college sprinter Erin Brown was heavily critical of the Australian team and suggested they "humiliated" themselves on the world stage by not finishing on the podium and labelled the Australian team "trash". In late May 2026, Australian sprinter Eddie Nketia broke the national all-conditions 100m record with a time of 9.74 seconds at the NCAA Big Ten Championships and drew much criticism from American onlookers when he didn't break the 200m record at the same event. Nketia said a week later that he was excited by the prospect of joining the Australian relay team to combine with fellow countrymen Kennedy and Gout in future international meets and becoming a sprinting powerhouse nation that can rival the United States and Jamaica on the podium.

In June 2026, American Noah Lyles and Australian Gout Gout would race against one another for the first time competitively in the rarely contested 150m race at the Golden Spike Ostrava event, which saw 28 year old Lyles break Kishane Thompson's world record of 14.92 seconds with a time of 14.67 seconds and 18 year old Gout would finish third in the race with a time just shy of the previous world record by running the race in 14.96 seconds. A month later, 22-year-old Lachlan Kennedy broke the all-time Australian 100m record by running an impressive 9.85 seconds in the final at the 2026 Commonwealth Games on a rainy night in Glasgow, Scotland and declared in a post-race interview that Australian track is currently experiencing a "golden age" and is in the best spot its ever been. Kennedy's historic 100m performance at the 2026 Commonwealth Games caught the attention of several American commentators who began speculating on the implications for the upcoming 2028 Summer Olympics in Los Angeles. Several days later, Kennedy shocked international onlookers again by running a blistering opening leg for Australia's gold medal winning 4x100m Commonwealth Games relay team in which they defeated Canada's gold medal winning 2024 4x100m Olympic relay team of Aaron Brown, Jerome Blake, Brendon Rodney and Andre De Grasse.

== Basketball ==
Due to an explosion of basketball popularity in Australia in the 1980s, a rivalry between the Australians and Americans formed in the ensuing decades. In 1996, Australia was set to compete against the US Dream Team II in the lead up to the 1996 Summer Olympics and NBA star Charles Barkley boldly claimed before the match that "We are the best country in the world. We're the best at basketball. We have got to kill them all." During the game, Australian guard Shane Heal hit a remarkable 8-from-13 from three-point range and when lining up for one of his shots in the third quarter, Barkley arrived late and aggressively undercut Heal sending him sprawling to the floor in front of the Australian bench. Undaunted by the height and weight differential, Heal, who stood six inches shorter than Barkley, chased the American star back down the court, letting fly with a volley of verbal barbs and bumped chests with Barkley. The pair were later chest-to-chest exchanging verbal remarks mid-court and had to be separated by referees and Karl Malone. The United States would go on to win the match, 118-77.

In August 2019, Australia defeated the United States 98–94 for the first time in the front of 52,000 fans at Marvel Stadium in Melbourne. In July 2021, Australia secured its second win in three years against the United States with a 91–83 victory in Las Vegas at a pre-Olympic warm-up game. In recent years, Australia has seen many more players getting drafted into the NBA who have committed to playing for the national team, which has raised the standard of the international play and has resulted in highly competitive performances against the United States. The United States have won 27 gold medals, 2 silver medals and 3 bronze medals all time in Olympic basketball, to Australia's 0 gold medals, 3 silver medals and 4 bronze medals.

== Soccer ==
A relatively subdued matchup between the Australian and US men's national soccer teams prior to 2025, the two nations have faced each other four times in international friendly matches with the Americans leading the head-to-head with two victories to Australia's one win and a solitary draw taking place in 1998. Three of the games between the two nations have taken place on American soil and the fourth on neutral territory in South Africa. In June 1992, Australia landed the first blow in the rivalry when the Socceroos claimed a 1–0 victory over the Americans in an international friendly that took place in Orlando. In November 1998, the two countries played out a 0–0 draw in their second encounter in San Jose before the Americans secured their first win over the Socceroos in June 2010 when they came out victorious 3–1 in Roodepoort, South Africa in a warm-up match that took place a week prior to the beginning of the 2010 FIFA World Cup.

Australia has made it to the round of 16 two times in their history, the 2006 and 2022 World Cups, while the United States has made the final 16 seven times in their history, including making the semifinals in 1930, the quarterfinals in 2002, and the round of 16 in 1994, 2010, 2014, 2022 and 2026.

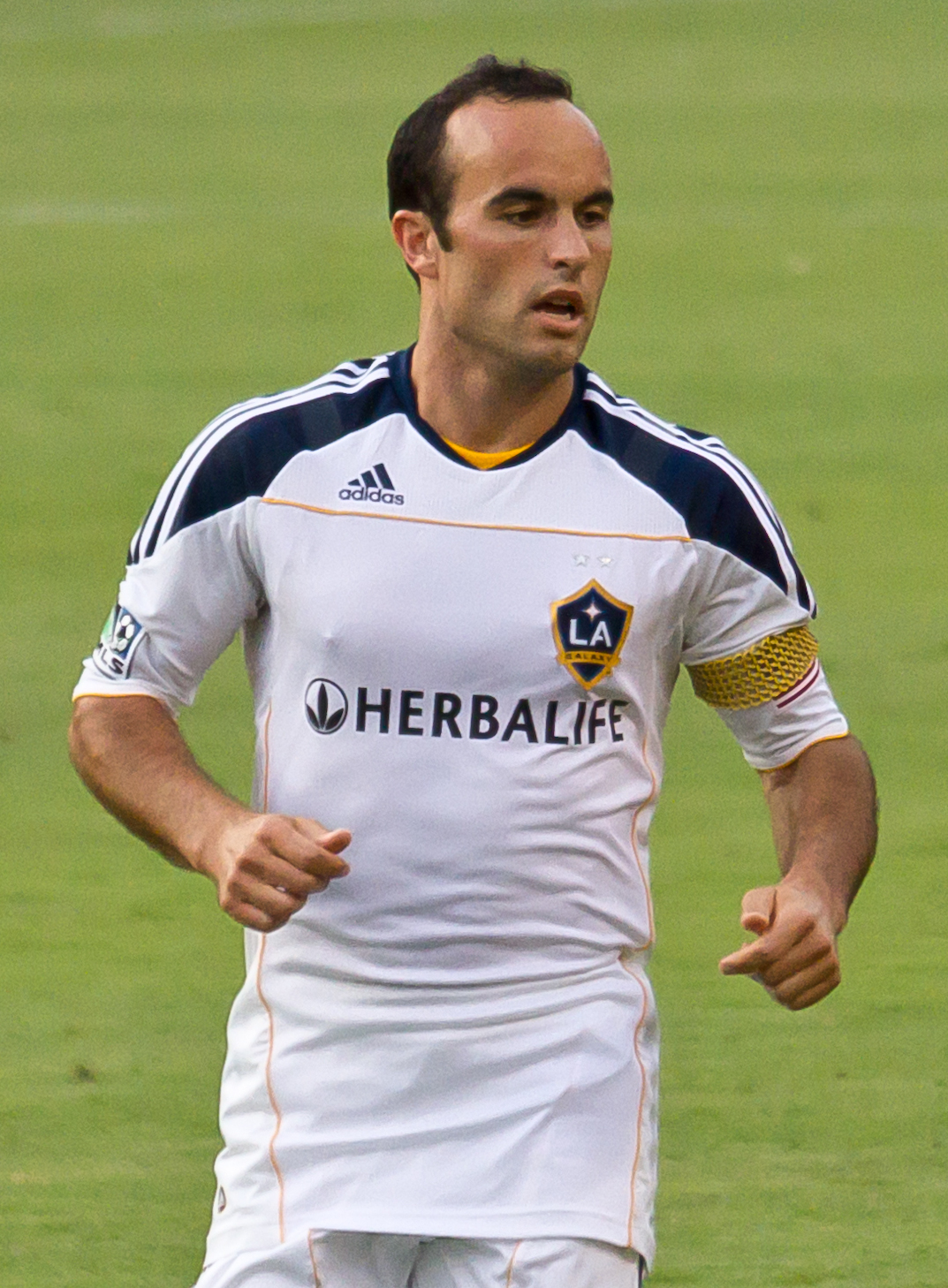
American soccer great Landon Donovan predicted Australia will finish last in the 2026 FIFA World Cup Group D that they share with the US and remarked "Thanks for coming, Aussies and your smug coach — you can get back on the Qantas airplane and head back home, pal."

A heated rivalry between the Australian and US men's national soccer teams ignited in their fourth meeting in October 2025 when a friendly match between the two nations took place in Colorado and the game was noted for the physicality displayed throughout the match. Australia shocked the home crowd by taking a 1–0 lead in the 19th minute before the US pulled off a come-from-behind 2–1 victory in a heated clash with the Aussies that broke their 12-match undefeated streak under coach Tony Popovic. Notably, American defender Chris Richards and Australian defender Cameron Burgess had to be separated by the refree during the match after a first half skirmish between the two. Richards was frustrated by the tackling pressure from the Australians during the match and commented postgame "They're lucky it was a friendly. I was ready to go. And if (the ref) didn't give me a sh*t yellow in the corner, I probably would’ve killed somebody." Australian defender Jason Geria responded to the criticisms by stating "We’re a physical team, and we’re up for a fight, regardless of the opponent," before adding "The U.S. is a pretty physical team as well, we were expecting that. We’re not a country that's gonna be overawed by a physical game."

Two months later, the Australian and US men's national soccer teams were drawn to face off in a World Cup for the first time at the 2026 FIFA World Cup when USA will host the Socceroos in Seattle in the second match of Group D. The matchup received considerable hype from both nation's media in the lead up to the match as well as trash talk from former American national players and US pundits. When asked about the group fixture against Australia, US soccer great Landon Donovan said he found the Australian coach Tony Popovic to have a "smugness about him" before predicting Australia would finish last in Group D and quipped "Thanks for coming, Aussies and your smug coach — you can get back on the Qantas airplane and head back home, pal." Popovic responded to the remarks by stating "Anyone that underestimates us, I think will get a rude shock when it comes to those group games."

American soccer presenter and former player Mike Grella immediately referred to the match against Australia as a "layup" for the US and months later stated that "if USA can't beat Australia in a football match, stay home." Former Australian international goalkeeper Mark Schwarzer responded to the comments by stating "What we like to do is let our performances do the talking" and that "I love the thought process that if you can't beat Australia, you shouldn't be there. I mean, we've qualified for six straight World Cups. We are there because we deserve to be there," before firing a shot back at Grella by rhetorically asking "Did you guys qualify in 2018? Oh wait, no you didn't."

A day later, Fox Sports Soccer Analyst and former US national player Alexi Lalas dismissed Australia as a threat to the US in the World Cup as the Socceroos have "no stars" and have "little in the way of true quality" before doubling down several days later by stating that the US should beat Australia because they are " an average team by any measure, and certainly not a great team." When asked to comment on the US punditry towards the Socceroos just days out from the beginning of the 2026 FIFA World Cup, Australian coach Tony Popovic said he found the American commentary "amusing" before adding "we’ve always had a good rivalry against the Americans, and they're not shy to shoot their mouths off and say what they think. We’ve got a chance to shoot our mouths off as well, but do it on the field. I anticipate that our talking will be loud and clear on the pitch."

On June 10, 2026, US defender Chris Richards said there was genuine "bad blood" between the American and Australian national teams and that the last time the two nations faced each other in a friendly match "wasn't so friendly" therefore he is expecting a "very physical" game when they play in their World Cup group match in 9 days' time. A day before Australia and the US played their opening group games of the 2026 FIFA World Cup, American pundit Mike Grella took another shot at the Australian national team by stating "I'm not kidding though when I say this, what are they drinking over there because they have no shot of doing anything at the World Cup. They are the weakest team in the group" before adding "There's no shot Australia can compete with the US."

Following Australia's 2–0 upset victory over the highly fancied Turkish national team in the opening game of the 2026 FIFA World Cup, US pundit Mike Grella was unwilling to walk back on his inaccurate pre-tournament comments and instead responded "I one million percent stand by what I said and how I feel about the game. I think we’re better at every position. In a game of football anything can happen, but for sure, in (Pot 2), they were the layup team. I fully believe that. I'm doubling down. I can't wait to play them in the World Cup to see what they've got." Later that day, Socceroos legend Harry Kewell was asked if he had seen Mike Grella's comments and fired back by quipping "The USA is talking like they're some unbelievable footballing – or soccer – nation. I would love to play their golden generation against our golden generation. It wouldn't even be a contest. I don't know what they're harping on about, I really don't." The United States went on to beat Australia 2–0 in their 2026 World Cup match, with Australia later on being eliminated in the round of 32 and the United States being eliminated in the round of 16.

== Swimming ==
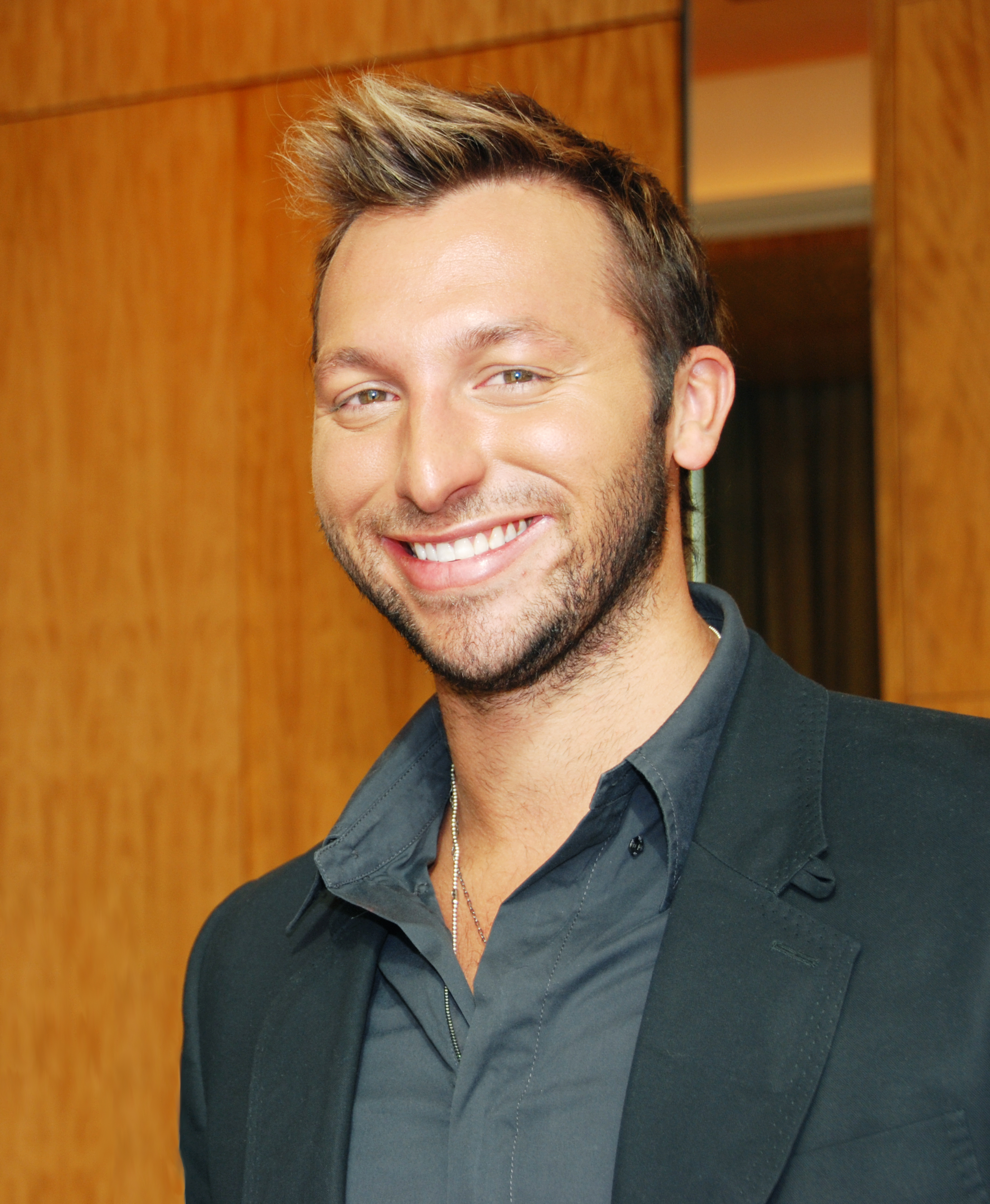
Australian Ian Thorpe famously chased down American Gary Hall Jr. in the final leg of the 4 x 100 metre freestyle relay at 2000 Summer Olympics and defeated American swimming superstar Michael Phelps in the 200 metre Freestyle Race of the Century at the 2004 Summer Olympics.

The United States and Australia are the two most successful nations in Olympic swimming history and often share the podium with one another at each international meet. An intense rivalry has developed as a result and swimmers from both nations have acknowledged the opposing country as their biggest rival.

Leading into the 2000 Summer Olympics held in Sydney, Australia, American sprint swimmer Gary Hall Jr. commented on the upcoming 4 x 100 metre freestyle relay event and confidently stated that the US team would "smash them (Australia) like guitars." The US had never been beaten in the near 40-year history of the event and Hall faced a 17-year-old Ian Thorpe in the last leg of the relay. Hall had the better start and came up a body length ahead of Thorpe before clocking a 0.23 second lead at the turn. Thorpe then fought back in the final lap and both swimmers were even with 15 metres to go in front of a raucous Australian crowd. Thorpe would finish first by a hand-length and the Australian swimmers would celebrate the win by playing air guitar on the pool deck.

Following the 2000 Olympics, Australia's Ian Thorpe established himself as one of the best and most exciting swimmers in the world, which was highlighted when he became the first swimmer to secure six gold medals in a single World Championship meet at the 2001 World Aquatics Championships at 18 years old. Then 16 year old American Michael Phelps secured his first World Championship gold medal at the same event in the 200m Butterfly and the two teenage swimmers were viewed as the future of the sport. The pair would compete against one another for the first time at the 2003 World Aquatics Championships in 200m Individual Medley event and Phelps caused a major upset by defeating the second placed Thorpe and breaking the world record in the process. Anticipation for their next race built in the lead up to the 2004 Summer Olympics with the pair to race in the 200m Freestyle event with defending Olympic champion Pieter van den Hoogenband and Australian Grant Hackett in what would be dubbed the Race of the Century. Thorpe would come out victorious and claim the gold medal in the historic race while Phelps would finish third and claim the bronze medal. Much to the disappointment of many within the swimming industry, Thorpe would retire from the sport at the early age of 24 in 2006 citing burnout and lack of motivation, preventing highly anticipated future clashes with Phelps.

In the lead up to the 2008 Summer Olympics, recently retired Australian swimmer Ian Thorpe was asked if he thought American swimmer Michael Phelps could break compatriot Mark Spitz's record of seven gold medals in a single Olympic Games appearance and Thorpe said "I don't think he will do it but I'd love to see it" before later adding "But mind you, if there is any person on the planet who is capable, it is him. It's sad, but I just don't think it will happen." Phelps perceived Thorpe's comments as insulting and later revealed "Every day when I'd open that locker, it was the first thing I'd see, that article, Ian's words, dangling there. Every day when I'd close that locker door, that fluttering piece of paper served as a reminder of the many doubters." Phelps would go on to prove Thorpe wrong by winning eight Olympic gold medals at the 2008 Beijing Games, which included a win in the 200m Freestyle event that Thorpe had defeated Phelps in at the 2004 Olympics, and is a record amount of gold medals in a single Olympics that still stands to this day.

In 2011, after nearly five years since his last competitive race, Australian Ian Thorpe announced he was returning to swimming with the aim of competing at the 2012 Summer Olympics. The announcement was welcomed by American Michael Phelps who would make an admission that he had been lacking motivation to continue swimming competitively for several years and said it would be "fun" to face Thorpe at the 2012 Olympics. However, Thorpe was unable to qualify for the 2012 Olympics after swimming slower qualifying times than he had expected and would ultimately suffer a career-ending shoulder injury that would force him into a second retirement a year later, once again preventing him from racing against Phelps in highly anticipated swimming meets.

The swimming rivalry between the two nations reached its most intense level in the lead up to the 2024 Summer Olympics when Australian Cate Campbell stated on a national broadcast that "It is just so much sweeter beating America. There were a couple of nights, particularly the first night of competition, where we did not have to hear ‘Star-Spangled Banner’ ring out through the stadium, and I cannot tell you how happy that made me." She also mentioned that "the U.S. have this infernal cowbell they ring. And as someone leaves to go to the competition pool, they ring out, ‘USA, USA,’ and I have never wanted to punch someone more." These statements infuriated the US team with Lilly King stating "Is it going to be worse if they beat us than somebody else? Yeah."

Former American swimmer Michael Phelps was also asked to comment on the statements made by Campbell and was visibly deturbed by the comments responding that if he was on the team he'd "watch [Campbell's comments] every single day to give me that little extra" and that he "would make them eat every word they said" if they said that to him. Phelps appeared on ESPN a week before the 2024 Olympics and stated that there was a "big-time rivalry" between the American and Australian national swimming teams that is ultra competitive in the pool, but also revealed swimmers from both nations are friendly outside the pool with Grant Hackett and Ian Thorpe being two of Phelps' good friends that he regularly stays in contact with.

Despite outperforming the Americans by finishing six gold medals ahead of the US at the 2023 World Aquatics Championships, the Aussies fell agonisingly short of a famous victory over the Americans at the 2024 Olympics when the US were able to secure one more swimming gold medal than Australia on the final day of competition. At the 2025 World Aquatics Championships, the United States would once again finish just one gold medal ahead of Australia in the swimming events when the American women's 4 × 100 m medley relay team secured a gold medal in the final race of the event.

In August 2026, Australia would put together its best ever Pan Pacific Swimming Championships performance by winning 15 gold medals at the 2026 event in Irvine, California to closely finish second behind the Americans who won 19 gold medals at their home event. Australia's performance was particularly impressive due to missing several of their best swimmers for the event such as Olympic gold medallists Kyle Chalmers, Cameron McEvoy, Kaylee McKeown and Mollie O'Callaghan due to injuries or choosing to focus on the 2026 Commonwealth Games meet in Europe two weeks prior.

In the lead up to the 2026 Pan Pacific Championships, Australian swimmer Sam Short stated publicly that he couldn't wait to travel to California and "smash those yanks", which would come to fruition with Short winning the gold medals in all three events he entered; the freestyle races of the 400m, 800m, 1500m and defeating American long distance superstar Bobby Finke several times in the process. Short was subsequently awarded the 'Best Male Swimmer' award for his impressive performance at the event. The 2026 Pan Pacific Championships also saw Australian swimmer Lani Pallister notably deal American superstar Katie Ledecky her first loss in 15 years in the 800m freestyle event; which resulted in Pallister claiming the gold medal ahead of Ladecky's silver medal performance.

Despite the gap in international swimming success between the two nations seemingly closing in recent years, the United States is the most successful swimming nation in history with 20 first place finishes in the Olympic swimming medal tally to Australia's 1, which occurred at the 1956 Summer Olympics. The Americans have topped the swimming medal tally at the World Aquatics Championships 16 times to Australia's 3 and the US has finished in first place at the Pan Pacific Swimming Championships medal tally 13 times to Australia's sole victory at the 1999 event.

== Tennis ==
The United States and Australian Davis Cup teams are the two most successful nations in Davis Cup history with 32 and 28 titles respectively. The two nations first played each other in the World Group final of the 1905 competition with the United States claiming a clean sweep 5–0 victory. The Australian team claimed their first victory over the US team two years later and went on to defeat Great Britain to claim its first ever Davis Cup title.

The decades that followed were dominated by the Australian and United States teams and the two nations developed an intense rivalry with one another during a 36-year stretch between 1937 and 1973 in which one of the two nations claimed the Davis Cup title, including 16 straight years in which they played each other in the final. Outside of Davis Cup, countrymen of the two nations have competed in many Grand Slam finals with the most recent meeting occurring at the 2001 US Open Men's Final when a 20-year-old Australian Lleyton Hewitt caused a major upset against American 13-time Grand Slam champion Pete Sampras 7–6^{(7–4)}, 6–1, 6–1 to capture the 2001 US Open Championship. Hewitt and American Andy Roddick shared a fierce, career-long rivalry in the early 2000s that saw the two play on 14 occasions with the win-loss record even split seven each with the pair playing multiple times in the latter stages of Grand Slam tournaments. Since retiring, Roddick acknowledged Hewitt as his biggest rival during his career and named him the "best competitor" he ever faced.

In their most recent meeting at the 2024 Davis Cup Quarterfinal, Australia defeated the United States 2–1 in an epic tie that contained a third set tiebreaker victory for Australia in which 10 match points were saved before Thanasi Kokkinakis defeated Ben Shelton 6-1, 4-6, 7-6^{(14)}. The result brought the overall Davis Cup ledger between the two nations to 26–22 in favour of the Americans.

On the men's side, in the Open Era, the United States has won 52 Grand Slams, won by 13 different players, compared to Australia's 20 Grand Slams, won by 7 different players. On the women's side in the Open Era, the United States has won 90 Grand Slams, won by 15 different players, compared to Australia's 24 Grand Slams, won by 6 players.

== See also ==
- List of sports rivalries
- Australia–England sports rivalries
- Canada–United States sports rivalries
