= 2025 European Athletics U23 Championships – Men's 200 metres =

Men's 200 metres at the 2025 European Athletics U23 Championships
- Venue: Fana Stadion
- Location: Bergen, Norway
- Dates: 18 July (heats); 19 July (semi-finals & final)
- Competitors: 26 from 21 nations
- Winning time: 20.64

Medalists
gold medal	Blessing Afrifah	Israel
silver medal	Damiano Dentato	Italy
bronze medal	Jaime Sancho	Spain

The men's 200 metres event at the 2025 European Athletics U23 Championships was held in Bergen, Norway, at Fana Stadion on 18 and 19 July.

== Records ==
Prior to the competition, the records were as follows:

Record	Athlete (nation)	Time (s)	Location	Date
European U23 record	Christophe Lemaitre (FRA)	19.80	Daegu, South Korea	3 September 2011
Championship U23 record	Ján Volko (SVK)	20.33	Bydgoszcz, Poland	15 July 2017

== Results ==
=== Heats ===
First 3 in each heat (Q) and the next 4 fastest (q) qualified for the semi-finals.

==== Heat 1 ====
Place	Athlete	Nation	Time	Notes
1	Damiano Dentato	Italy	20.74	Q
2	Erik Erlandsson	Sweden	20.89	Q
3	Kenny Emi Tijani-Ajayi	Norway	20.93	Q, PB
4	Jurij Beber	Slovenia	20.99	q, PB
5	Mathieu Chèvre	Switzerland	21.01	q
6	Balázs Mészáros	Hungary	21.24	q
			Wind: (−1.4 m/s)	

==== Heat 2 ====
Place	Athlete	Nation	Time	Notes
1	Igor Bogaczyński	Poland	20.71	Q
2	Filippo Cappelletti	Italy	21.02	Q
3	Ábel Takács	Hungary	21.40	Q, SB
4	Justin Rennert	Germany	21.45	
5	Remus Andrei Niculiță	Romania	21.48	
—	Jeriel Quainoo	Great Britain	DQ	TR 17.2.3
—	Beppe Grillo	Malta	DNS	
			Wind: (−0.8 m/s)	

==== Heat 3 ====
Place	Athlete	Nation	Time	Notes
1	Linus Pihl	Sweden	21.20	Q
2	Deniz Kaan Kartal	Turkey	21.28	Q
3	Jaime Sancho	Spain	21.31	Q
4	Waly Bathily	France	21.39	
5	Andrew Egan	Ireland	21.77	
6	Neloo Falck	Denmark	24.64	
			Wind: (−3.0 m/s)	

==== Heat 4 ====
Place	Athlete	Nation	Time	Notes
1	Blessing Afrifah	Israel	20.92	Q
2	Eduardo Longobardi	Italy	21.14	Q
3	Timo Spiering	Netherlands	21.16	Q
4	Gabriel Maia	Portugal	21.20	q
5	Andrej Skočir	Slovenia	21.28	
6	Valtteri Louko	Finland	21.55	
7	Filip Federič	Slovakia	21.71	
			Wind: (−2.7 m/s)	

=== Semi-finals ===
First 3 in each heat (Q) and the next 2 fastest (q) qualified for the final.

==== Heat 1 ====
Place	Athlete	Nation	Time	Notes
1	Blessing Afrifah	Israel	20.59	Q
2	Damiano Dentato	Italy	20.78	Q
3	Jaime Sancho	Spain	20.84	Q
4	Erik Erlandsson	Sweden	20.89	q
5	Timo Spiering	Netherlands	20.92	q
6	Eduardo Longobardi	Italy	20.96	
7	Mathieu Chèvre	Switzerland	21.14	
8	Balázs Mészáros	Hungary	21.59	
			Wind: (−1.4 m/s)	

==== Heat 2 ====
Place	Athlete	Nation	Time	Notes
1	Igor Bogaczyński	Poland	20.83	Q
2	Filippo Cappelletti	Italy	20.86	Q
3	Linus Pihl	Sweden	20.96	Q, SB
4	Kenny Emi Tijani-Ajayi	Norway	20.98	
5	Deniz Kaan Kartal	Turkey	21.02	
6	Gabriel Maia	Portugal	21.15	
7	Jurij Beber	Slovenia	21.38	
8	Ábel Takács	Hungary	21.53	
			Wind: (−0.3 m/s)	

=== Final ===
Place	Athlete	Nation	Time	Notes
1st place, gold medalist(s)	Blessing Afrifah	Israel	20.64	
2nd place, silver medalist(s)	Damiano Dentato	Italy	20.69	
3rd place, bronze medalist(s)	Jaime Sancho	Spain	20.76	
4	Erik Erlandsson	Sweden	20.80	
5	Timo Spiering	Netherlands	20.82	PB
6	Filippo Cappelletti	Italy	20.85	
7	Linus Pihl	Sweden	20.90	PB
8	Igor Bogaczyński	Poland	20.93	
			Wind: (−0.7 m/s)	
