= Joshua Azzopardi =

Australian sprinter (born 1999)

Personal information
- Born: 27 November 1999 (age 26) Penrith, New South Wales, Australia
- Height: 1.81 m (5 ft 11 in)

Sport
- Sport: Athletics
- Event: Sprint

Achievements and titles
- Personal bests: 60m: 6.52 (2025); 100m: 10.09 (2025); 200m: 20.82 (2022); 4 x 100m: 38.12 (2024) AR
Medal record
Men's athletics
Representing Australia
Commonwealth Games
Gold medal – first place	2026 Glasgow	4×100m relay
Oceania Championships
Gold medal – first place	2024 Suva	100 m
Gold medal – first place	2026 Darwin	100 m
Bronze medal – third place	2022 Mackay	100 m

Joshua Azzopardi (born 27 November 1999) is an Australian sprinter. In 2024, he became Oceania champion in the 100 metres.

== Early life ==
From Sydney, he started athletics when he was six years-old. He also played Australian Rules Football as a youngster and played rugby league for Camden Rams. He was offered a Rugby Sevens contract by Rugby Australia in 2019, but declined in order to focus on athletics. He received a New South Wales Institute of Sport scholarship.

== Career ==
Azzopardi ran as part of the Australian 4x100m relay team at the 2024 World Relays Championships in Nassau, Bahamas, where they qualified for the 2024 Paris Olympics.

In June 2024, he won gold in the 100 metres at the 2024 Oceania Athletics Championships in Suva, Fiji, ahead of Australian champion Sebastian Sultana. He competed in the 100 metres and in the men's 4x100m relay at the 2024 Paris Olympics, being part of the team which set a new Australian and Oceania Area record of 38.12 s in the heats.

Azzopardi surpassed the 2025 World Athletics Indoor Championships 60 metres qualifying mark with 6.52 s at the ACT Open Athletics Championships on 25 January 2025. He was runner-up to Lachlan Kennedy over 60 metres at the Australian short track national championships in Sydney on 1 February 2025. He ran a personal best 10.09 seconds for the 100 metres at the Perth Classic on 1 March 2025. He was selected for the 2025 World Athletics Indoor Championships in Nanjing in March 2025.

In March 2025, he helped break the Australian 4x100m relay national record, running 37.87 seconds at the Sydney Track Classic alongside Lachlan Kennedy, Calab Law, and Christopher Ius. He competed for Australia at the 2025 World Athletics Relays in China, helping the Australian men's 4x100m team qualify for the 2025 World Championships. In September 2025, he competed in the 100 metres at the 2025 World Championships in Tokyo, Japan. He also ran in the men's 4 x 100 metres relay at the championships.

Azzopardi equalled his personal best to win the 100 metres at the Perth Track Classic on 14 February 2026, with a time of 10.09 (+1.9). On 11 April, he finished runner-up to Lachlan Kennedy over 100 metres at the 2026 Australian Championships.

Competing at the 2026 World Athletics Relays in Botswana the following month, he ran alongside Kennedy, Christopher Ius and Rohan Browning and equalled the Oceania record of 37.87 seconds on the opening day, before placing fourth in the final in 38.00 seconds. Later that month, he retained his 100 m title at the 2026 Oceania Athletics Championships in Darwin, running 10.21 seconds into a headwind (-1.0) having equaled the championship record of 10.19 seconds in his semi-final. At the 2026 Commonwealth Games in Glasgow, Scotland, he won the gold medal with the Australian team in the men's 4 × 100 m relay.
