= Josh Harris (runner) =

Australian long-distance runner (born 1990)

Personal information
- Nationality: Australian
- Born: 3 July 1990 (age 35)

Sport
- Sport: Long-distance running
- Event: Marathon

Josh Harris (born 3 July 1990) is an Australian long-distance runner. He competed in the men's marathon at the 2017 World Championships in Athletics. Harris has Australian records in athletics in the 25,000m and 30,000m, set in July 2016.
