= Favour Ashe =

Nigerian athlete (born 2002)

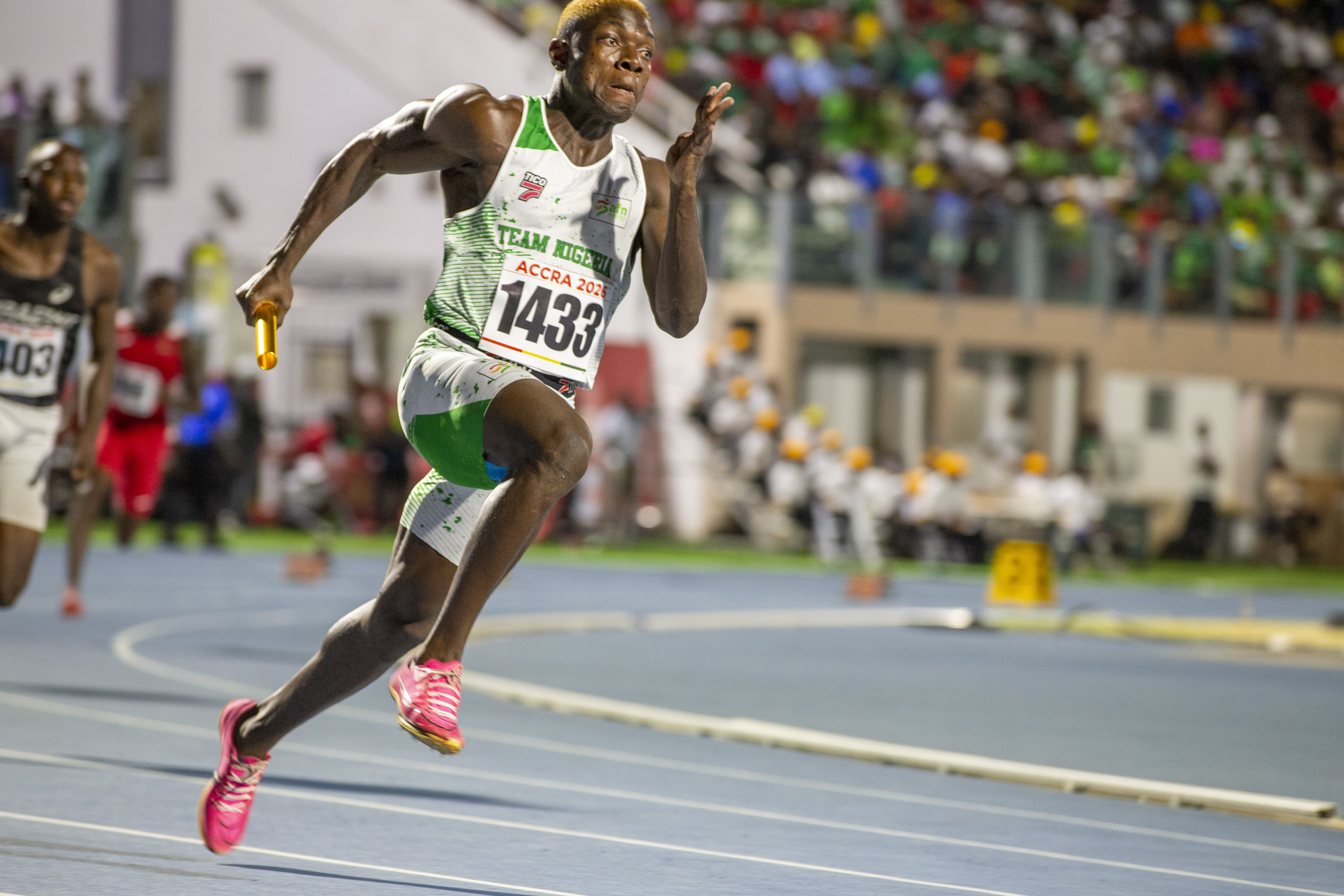
- Favour Ashe at the 2026 African Athletics Championships

Personal information
- Born: Favour Oghenetejiri Ashe; 28 April 2002 (age 24)
- Height: 183 cm (6 ft 0 in)

Sport
- Sport: Track and field
- Events: 60 metres, 100 metres, 200 metres

Achievements and titles
- Personal bests: 60m: 6.51s (Birmingham, 2022); 100m: 9.93s (Lagos, 2026); 200m: 21.12s (Uyo, 2025)
Medal record
Men's athletics
Representing Nigeria
African Championships
Silver medal – second place	2026 Accra	4×100 m relay
Commonwealth Games
Bronze medal – third place	2026 Glasgow	4×100m relay
Bronze medal – third place	2022 Birmingham	4×100 m relay

Favour Ashe (born 28 April 2002) is a Nigerian sprinter He represented Nigeria at the 2024 Olympic Games and was a medalist in the 4 x 100 metres relay at the 2022 Commonwealth Games.

== Biography ==
=== College career ===
Ashe attended Otovwodo Grammar School in Ughelli, Nigeria before enrolling as a student at the University of Tennessee. Having only arrived in America in January 2022, Ashe came third in the men's 60-meter dash at the 2022 NCAA Division I Indoor Track and Field Championships, and was runner up in the 100 metres at the 2022 NCAA Division I Outdoor Track and Field Championships. He also came fourth in the 4 x 100m relay running with Wayne Pinnock, Carey McLeod and Emmanuel Bynum. In 2022 Ashe ran the fastest time in history by any Nigerian athlete in all conditions, running a wind assisted 9.79s (+3.0) 100m heat at the LSU invitational meet in Baton Rouge. Following the 2022 collegiate season, he transferred to Auburn University to continue his studies and athletic career. In June 2023 he set a new personal best running 9.96s in the 100m at the NCAA Championships held in Texas.

In May 2024, he ran 9.94 seconds for the 100 metres at the NCAA East regional finals in Lexington, Kentucky and in doing so became the first Nigerian sprinter to run sub-10 seconds five times in three consecutive years. He was runner-up in the 100m at the 2024 NCAA Division I Outdoor Track and Field Championships in Eugene, Oregon running 9.99 seconds in the final.

In January 2025, Favour Ashe signed with the University of Oregon.

=== Senior career ===
Ashe ran a legal 100m personal best [at the time] of 9.99s to win gold at the Nigerian national championships in 2022, breaking the ten-second barrier. At the 2022 World Athletics Championships in Eugene, Oregon, Ashe qualified through to the semi-finals running 10.00s in his heat. He went on to end his season with a bronze medal in the 4 x 100m relay at the 2022 Commonwealth Games in Birmingham, England.

Ashe competed in the 100 metres at the 2024 Paris Olympics, reaching the semi-finals. He also competed in the men's 4x100m relay at the Games. In 2025, Ashe was disqualified in the final of the 100 metres at the Nigerian National Sports Festival in Abeokuta.

In February 2026, Ashe was reported to be changing his international representation to Qatar, having been based in the country for the previous five months. However, he competed for Nigeria at the 2026 World Athletics Relays on 2 May, where he was part of the Nigerian mixed 4 x 100 metres relay team which qualified for the final, running an African record 40.24 seconds. He also ran in the men's 4 × 100 metres relay at the championships in Gaborone, Botswana.

In June 2026, he became the national champion after winning the 100m at the Nigerian national trials in a personal-best time of 9.93 seconds. With the performance, Ashe became the first Nigerian man to break the 10-second barrier alongside Nicholas Fakorede (9.98 seconds for silver) in the 100m since Deji Aliu and Uchenna Emedolu achieved the feat at the 2003 African Games in Abuja. Competing at the 2026 Commonwealth Games, he won the bronze medal in the men's 4 × 100 m relay. He also competed in the 100 metres at the Games in Glasgow, Scotland, reaching the semi-finals.
