= Jack Rayner (runner) =

Australian long-distance runner

Personal information
- Nationality: Australian
- Born: 19 December 1995 (age 30)

Sport
- Country: Australia
- Sport: Track and Field
- Event(s): 1500m, 3000m, 5000m, 10,000m, Half marathon, Marathon
- Club: Melbourne Track Club

Achievements and titles
- Personal bests: 1500 m: 3:45.7h (Melbourne 2016); Mile: 3:58.7h (Melbourne 2017); 3000 m: 7:47.62 (Stockholm 2022); 5000 m: 12:59.43i (Boston 2025); 10,000 m: 27:15.35 (San Juan Capistrano 2022) AR, NR; Half marathon: 59:53 (Barcelona 2026); Marathon: 2:11:06 (London 2019)

Jack Rayner (born 19 December 1995) is an Australian long-distance runner. He qualified for the 2020 Summer Olympics held in Tokyo, Japan. He ran in the men's marathon but failed to finish due to cramping in both his legs after running 500 meters.

Rayner is part of the Melbourne Track Club.

== Early years ==
When Rayner was about 7 years of age his parents looked for a sport for him. A neighbour suggested he would make a good cross country runner. By the age of 9 he had a coach, Keith Fearnley. A year later he ran at his first national cross country championships. For the next ten years he continued to run nationally mostly finishing just outside the medals. However, when he was 17 years of age he won the national junior 5000m.

After school, Rayner was unsure what to do with his life and worked in landscaping for a few years. He still ran long distances and competed in fun runs. He then decided to take his running seriously and joined Nic Bideau's Melbourne Track Club.

== Achievements ==
In 2015 he won the Australian national championships in the 3000m. In 2018 he won the half marathon national championships in the Sunshine Coast. Later on in 2018, Jack won the inaugural half marathon Commonwealth championships in Cardiff in a time of 1:01:01.

In October 2019 he was one of forty-one pacemakers in the Ineos 1:59 Challenge, where Eliud Kipchoge successfully became the first person to run the marathon distance in under 2 hours.

In April 2019, Rayner made his marathon debut in London and clocked a Tokyo Olympic qualifier of 2:11.06, a time which has held up for selection for the postponed Games in 2021.

On 6 March 2022 Rayner set a new Australian record in the 10,000m with a time of 27:15.22.

On 21 February 2025, Rayner set a new Oceanian and Australian short track 5,000m record of 12.59.43, becoming the first Australian to run under 13 minutes indoors. Rayner won the 2024 and 2025 editions of the Melbourne Marathon.
