= Denzel Simusialela =

Zimbabwean sprinter (born 2004

Personal information
- Born: 24 February 2004 (age 22)

Sport
- Sport: Athletics
- Event: Sprint

Achievements and titles
- Personal bests: 60m: 6.63 (2025); 100m: 10.03 (2025); 200m: 20.09 (2026)
Medal record
Men's athletics
Representing Zimbabwe
African Championships
Bronze medal – third place	2022 Mauritius	4×100 m

Denzel Simusialela (born 22 February 2004) is a Zimbabwean sprinter. He won the bronze medal with the Zimbabwe 4 × 100 metres relay team at the 2022 African Championships in Athletics.

== Biography ==
Simusialela won the bronze medal with the Zimbabwe 4 × 100 metres relay team at the 2022 African Championships in Athletics in St. Pierre, Mauritius, alongside Ngoni Makusha, Dickson Kamungeremu, and Tapiwa Makarawu, the country’s first medal at the African Championships for 18 years. He went on to represent the country at the 2022 World Athletics U20 Championships in Cali, Colombia in the 200 metres, without progressing to the final. The following year, he ran in the 100 and 200 metres at the 2023 African Athletics U20 Championships in Ndola, Zambia. That year, Siamulela accepted a scholarship at South Plains College in the United States.

In 2025, Simusialela ranked 49th in the world for the 200 metres with a time of 20.20 seconds, and was 32nd in the world for the indoor 200m with a time of 20.67 seconds. That year, he also ran a personal best for the 100 metres of 10.03 seconds, and joined the University of Kentucky in the United States.

Competing for Kentucky in 2026, Simusialela ran 6.64 seconds for the 60 m, and an indoors personal best of 20.47 seconds for the 200 metres and places sixth at the 2026 NCAA Division I Indoor Track and Field Championships in the 200 m. Competing outdoors in May at the Jim Green Invitational in Kentucky, Simusialela ran a new personal best for the 200 metres of 20.09 seconds (+2.0 m/s). On 11 July, he won a wind-assisted 200 metres at the Ed Murphey Classic in Memphis, Tennessee.
