= Jaime Sancho =

Spanish sprinter (born 2003)

Personal information
- Nationality: Spanish
- Born: 25 April 2003 (age 23)

Sport
- Sport: Athletics
- Event: Sprint

Achievements and titles
- Personal best(s): 60m: 6.83 (2026); 100m 10.28 (2025); 200m: 20.52 (2025); 400m: 49.91 (2024)
Medal record
Men's athletics
Representing Spain
European U23 Championships
| Bronze medal – third place | 2025 Bergen | 200m |
| Bronze medal – third place | 2025 Bergen | 4x100 m relay |

Jaime Sancho (born 25 April 2003) is a Spanish sprinter. He won the bronze medal at the 2025 European Athletics U23 Championships over 200 metres.

== Biography ==
From Madrid and a member of Atletismo Numantino, Sancho played hockey and football before focusing on athletics, his mother Susana Solanas had also been a sprinter. In 2020 he reached three national under-18 finals before becoming Spanish under-20 champion over 200 metres and representing at the 2021 European Athletics U20 Championships, reaching the final. That year, he set a Madrid U20 200m record with a time of 21.28s.

In June 2025, Sancho achieved a personal best in the 100 meters in Salamanca with a time of 10.28 seconds. Competing at the 2025 Spanish U23 Championships in Badajozthe following month, he ran a wind-assisted 200 m in 20.40s, which would have been a Spanish U23 record were it not for a very slight excessive wind of +2.1 m/s. He won the bronze medal at the 2025 European Athletics U23 Championships over 200 metres in Bergen, Norway, running 20.76 seconds in the final. At the championships, he also won the bronze medal in the men’s 4 x 100 metres relay. The following month, he ran a personal best 20.52 seconds (+2.0) to finish runner-up to Andoni Calbano at the senior Spanish Athletics Championships in Tarragona.

In February 2026, Sancho set a personal best of 6.83 seconds for the 60 metres at the World Athletics Indoor Tour meeting in Madrid. In May, he ran at the 2026 World Athletics Relays in the men's 4 × 100 metres relay in Gaborone, Botswana.
