= Blessing Afrifah =

Israeli sprinter (born 2003)

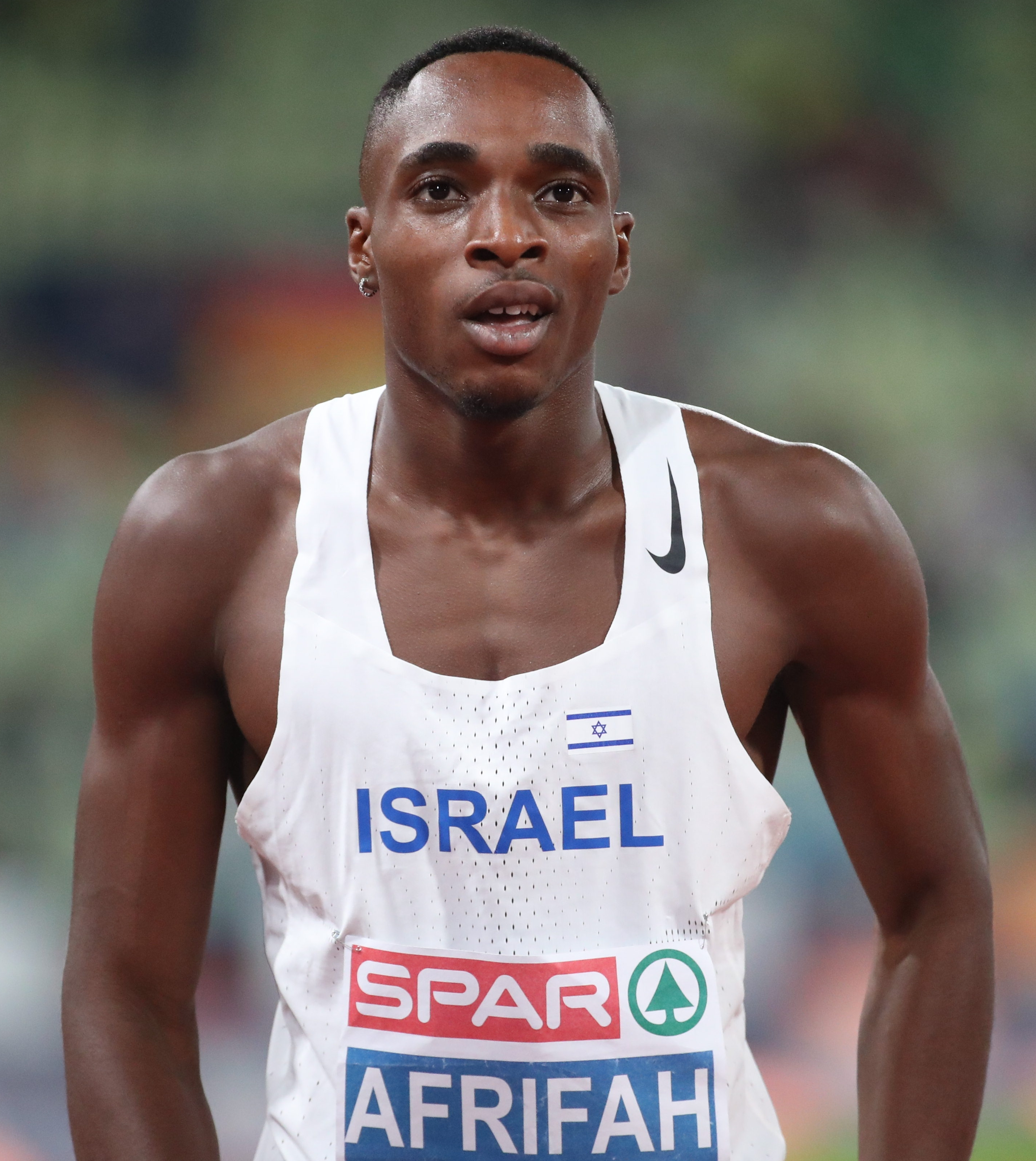
- Afrifah in 2022

Personal information
- Native name: בלסינג אקווסי אפריפה
- Full name: Blessing Akwasi Afrifah
- Born: 26 October 2003 (age 23) Tel Aviv, Israel
- Height: 5 ft 11 in (180 cm)
- Weight: 165 lb (75 kg)

Sport
- Country: Israel
- Sport: Athletics
- Event: Sprints
- Club: Maccabi Tel Aviv

Achievements and titles
- Personal bests: 60 m: 6.88 (Tel Aviv 2021); 100 m: 10.09 NR (Jerusalem 2025); 150 m: 15.57 (Tel Aviv 2023); 200 m: 19.96 AU20R NR NU20R (Cali 2022); 300 m: 33.26 (Tel Aviv 2022); Indoors; 60 m: 6.92i (Belgrade 2022); 200 m: 20.95i NR (Metz 2023)
Medal record
Men's athletics
Representing Israel
World U20 Championships
Gold medal – first place	2022 Cali	200 metres
European U23 Championships
Gold medal – first place	2023 Espoo	200 metres
Gold medal – first place	2025 Bergen	200 metres
- Updated on 20 July 2025

Blessing Akwasi Afrifah (Hebrew: בלסינג אקווסי אפריפה; born 26 October 2003) is an Israeli track and field athlete who specializes in the sprints. He was the 200 metres champion at the 2022 World U20 Championships as well as at the 2023 and 2025 European U23 Championships. Afrifah represented Israel at the 2024 Summer Olympics in the men's 200 metres, and finished 34th.

== Early life ==
Afrifah was born and raised in Tel Aviv, Israel, and later moved with his family to Ramat Gan, Israel. His parents are of Akan ethnicity, from Kumasi, Ghana, and moved to Israel a decade before he was born. His father and his mother initially came to Israel separately as tourists in the mid-1990s. They remained—with his father working in the consular division of Ghana's embassy, and his mother working as a cleaning lady. They named their son Blessing and their daughter Mercy. Mercy is also a sprinter.

As a child and teenager, Afrifah studied at Ohel Shem high school in Ramat Gan, Israel. He briefly played soccer, then turned to athletics at the age of 11. He speaks fluent Hebrew and English. He is 5 ft 11 in (180 cm), and weighs 165 pounds (75 kg).

== Running career ==
=== Early years; Israeli championships ===
At the age of 14, Afrifah began working with national coach Igor Balon. Afrifah's club is Maccabi Tel Aviv.

Afrifah won the Israeli Championship in the 100m in 2020, 2021, 2022, 2023, and 2024, with his best time being a 10.23 in 2023. He won the Israeli Championship in the 200m in 2020–24, with his best time being a 20.63 in 2023 in Jerusalem.

=== 2022; World U20 Champion ===
At the 2022 World Athletics U20 Championships in Cali, Colombia, at 18 years of age Afrifah won the 200 m in a photo finish with a championship record time of 19.954, 0.006 seconds ahead of Botswanan Letsile Tebogo. Afrifah, who then draped the Israeli flag across his body, was the first Israeli to run the 200 metres race in under 20 seconds. In recorded competitions, only two humans under age 20 had run a faster 200 meters, one being Jamaican sprinter Usain Bolt, who later won the event three times in the Olympics and four times in the world championships.

=== 2023-present; European U23 Champion ===
Next year, at the 2023 European Athletics U23 Championships in Espoo, Finland, Afrifah won the 200 m with a time of 20.67, just 0.01 second ahead of Dutch Raphael Bouju.

His personal best at the 100m is 10.20 in 2023 and 2024, and at the 200 m is 19.96 in 2022. His highest European ranking in the 200m was 4th.

Afrifah said: "I feel I'm standing for a community. Israel is a country that [some] countries hate, so it's an honor to represent them. I want to prove [anti-Israel slander] is not true and Israel is different, and I'm proving it through sports."

=== 2024 Paris Olympics ===
Afrifah represented Israel at the 2024 Paris Olympics in the men's 200 metres at the Stade de France. He attended a ceremony at the Paris Olympics that was held to remember the 11 Israeli Olympicans killed in the Munich Massacre at the 1972 Munich Olympic Games. At 20 years of age, he ran a 20.78 and came in 5th in his first round qualification heat, and he ran a 20.88 in the last chance repechage round, finishing 16th and not making it to the semifinals.

== Personal life ==
Although he was born and raised in Israel, Afrifah was not granted permanent residence status until 2020, following a government decision to not deport children of foreign workers born in Israel. At the age of 16, he was granted Israeli citizenship after he appealed to Israel's Minister of the Interior Aryeh Deri.

When asked about his feelings upon receiving his Israeli identity document, Afrifah replied: "I'm an Israeli. I was born here, my friends are here.... I'm no different from my friends, which are residents of Israel. I want to represent Israel and win medals." He was given full citizenship in 2020, and said: "I can't describe how excited I am; I couldn't even eat due to my excitement. I have more confidence and motivation to win achievements for Israel."

As an Israeli citizen and thus conscripted by law upon reaching 18 years of age, Afrifah served in the Israel Defense Forces beginning in 2022. He served on an army base in Rehovot, in a program limited to elite sportspeople that provides a more flexible service.

== Career statistics ==
Figures from World Athletics profile.

=== Personal bests ===
Surface	Distance	Time (s)	W (m/s)	Date	Location	Notes
Outdoor	60 metres	6.88	+0.7	21 January 2021	Tel Aviv, Israel	
Outdoor	100 metres	10.09	+1.8	30 July 2025	Jerusalem, Israel	NR
Outdoor	150 metres	15.57	+0.6	27 April 2023	Tel Aviv, Israel	
Outdoor	200 metres	19.96	−1.0	4 August 2022	Cali, Colombia	AU20R NR NU20R
Outdoor	300 metres	33.26		5 February 2022	Tel Aviv, Israel	
Outdoor	4 × 100 metres relay	39.66	—N/a	21 June 2023	Chorzów, Poland	
Indoor	60 metres	6.92	—N/a	12 February 2022	Belgrade, Serbia	
Indoor	200 metres	20.95	—N/a	11 February 2023	Metz, France	NR

=== International championships ===
Representing Israel
Year	Competition	Venue	Position	Event	Time	Wind (m/s)	Notes
2021	Balkan Championships	Smederevo, Serbia	5th (F)	200 m	21.28	+0.7	
2021	Balkan Championships	Smederevo, Serbia	3rd	4 × 100 m relay	40.12	—N/a	SB
2021	European U20 Championships	Tallinn, Estonia	4th (F)	200 m	21.01	+0.7	
2021	European U20 Championships	Tallinn, Estonia	7th (F)	4 × 100 m relay	41.18	—N/a	
2021	World U20 Championships	Nairobi, Kenya	7th (F)	200 m	21.03	+0.5	
2022	Balkan U20 Indoor Championships	Belgrade, Serbia	7th (F)	60 m	6.92i	—N/a	PB
2022	Balkan Championships	Craiova, Romania	1st	200 m	20.98	−1.9	
2022	Balkan Championships	Craiova, Romania	5th (F)	4 × 100 m relay	40.11	—N/a	
2022	World U20 Championships	Cali, Colombia	1st	200 m	19.96 [.954]	−1.0	AU20R CR NR NU20R PB
2022	European Championships	Munich, Germany	7th (F)	200 m	20.69	−0.3	
2023	European Team Championships	Chorzów, Poland	DQ	100 m	—N/a	—N/a	—N/a
2023	European Team Championships	Chorzów, Poland	2nd	4 × 100 m relay	39.66	—N/a	PB
2023	European U23 Championships	Espoo, Finland	1st	200 m	20.67	−1.1	
2023	World Championships	Budapest, Hungary	33rd (h)	200 m	20.73	−1.4	
2024	European Championships	Rome, Italy	7th	200 m	20.97	+0.8	
2024	Olympic Games	Paris, France	16th (rep)	200 m	20.88	0.0	
2025	European U23 Championships	Bergen, Norway	1st	200 m	20.64	−0.7	
2025	World Athletics Championships	Tokyo, Japan	28th (h)	200 m	20.47	−0.1	

=== 100m progression ===
Year	Time	Location	Date	Notes
2019	10.85	Tel Aviv, Israel		
2020	10.49	Tel Aviv, Israel	27 July	
2021				
2022				
2023				
2024				

=== 200m progression ===
Year	Time	Location	Date	Notes
2019	21.67	Tel Aviv, Israel	25 July	
2020	21.17	Tel Aviv, Israel	28 July	
2021	20.94	Tallinn, Estonia	16 July	
2022	19.96	Cali, Colombia	4 August	AU20R CR NR NU20R
2023	20.42	La Chaux-de-Fonds, Switzerland	2 July	
2024	20.46	Rome, Italy	9 June	

== See also ==
- List of Israeli records in athletics
- List of European under-20 records in athletics
- Sports in Israel
