= Athletics at the 2026 Commonwealth Games – Men's 4 × 100 metres relay =

Men's 4 × 100 metres relay at the 2026 Commonwealth Games
- Venue: Scotstoun Stadium, Glasgow
- Dates: 1 August 2026 (round 1 and final)
- Winning time: 38.07

Medalists
gold medal	Lachlan Kennedy; Joshua Azzopardi; Calab Law; Rohan Browning; Christopher Ius	Australia
silver medal	Aaron Brown; Jerome Blake; Brendon Rodney; Andre De Grasse; Duan Asemota	Canada
bronze medal	Favour Ashe; Kayinsola Ajayi; Adekalu Fakorede; Udodi Onwuzurike; Chidera Ezeakor	Nigeria

The men's 4 × 100 metres relay at the 2026 Commonwealth Games, as part of the athletics programme, took place in the Scotstoun Stadium, Glasgow on the morning and evening of 1 August 2026.

== Records ==
Prior to this competition, the existing world and Games records were as follows:

World record	Jamaica (Nesta Carter, Michael Frater, Yohan Blake, Usain Bolt)	36.84	London, United Kingdom	11 August 2012
Commonwealth record	Jamaica (Nesta Carter, Michael Frater, Yohan Blake, Usain Bolt)	36.84	London, United Kingdom	11 August 2012
Games record	Jamaica (Jason Livermore, Kemar Bailey-Cole, Nickel Ashmeade, Usain Bolt)	37.58	Glasgow, Scotland	2 August 2014

== Schedule ==
The schedule is as follows:

Date	Time	Round
1 August 2026	10:00	Round 1
1 August 2026	18:00	Final

All times are British Summer Time (UTC+1)

== Results ==
=== Round 1 ===
Round 1 was held on the morning of 1 August 2026.

Rank	Heat	Lane	Nation	Athletes	Time	Notes
1	2	5	South Africa	Mvuyo Moss, Cheswill Johnson, Bradley Nkoana, Akani Simbine	38.30	Q
2	2	8	Ghana	Benjamin Azamati, Joseph Paul Amoah, Mustapha Bokpin, Abdul-Rasheed Saminu	38.40	Q
3	1	6	Nigeria	Chidera Ezeakor, Kayinsola Ajayi, Adekalu Fakorede, Favour Ashe	38.46	Q
4	1	4	Canada	Aaron Brown, Jerome Blake, Duan Asemota, Andre De Grasse	38.53	Q
5	1	7	Australia	Christopher Ius, Joshua Azzopardi, Calab Law, Rohan Browning	38.69	Q
6	2	3	England	Elliot Jones, Nicholas Walsh, Nethaneel Mitchell-Blake, Romell Glave	38.90	Q
7	2	6	Jamaica	Ackeem Blake, Rohan Watson, Christopher Taylor, Jerome Campbell	39.13	q
8	1	2	Kenya	Mark Odhiambo, Zablon Ekwam, Meshack Babu, Elkana Kiprotich Sabila	39.66	q
9	1	3	Guyana	Akeem Stewart, Jackson Clarke, Noelex Holder, Shamar Horatio	39.96	SB
10	2	4	Singapore	Marc Brian Louis, Tate Tan Fung, Xander Ho Ann Heng, Ian Gan	40.07	
11	2	7	Turks and Caicos Islands	Markey Zephirn, Lerano Missick, Ronaldo Registre, Rayvon Black	41.21	SB
12	1	8	Togo	Komi Konu, Kossi Nayo, Philippe Djo Petitjean, Makman Yoagbati	41.95	SB
13	2	2	Saint Helena	Sean Crowie, Tyler Anthony, Blaze Baldiwn, Tye Leo-Stroud	43.85	SB
	1	5	Papua New Guinea	Pais Wisil, Tovetuna Tuna, Leroy Kamau, Johnny Bai	DQ	

=== Final ===
The final took place on the evening of 1 August 2026.

Rank	Lane	Nation	Athletes	Time	Notes
1st place, gold medalist(s)	8	Australia	Lachlan Kennedy, Joshua Azzopardi, Calab Law, Rohan Browning	38.07	
2nd place, silver medalist(s)	4	Canada	Aaron Brown, Jerome Blake, Brendon Rodney, Andre De Grasse	38.11	
3rd place, bronze medalist(s)	5	Nigeria	Favour Ashe, Kayinsola Ajayi, Adekalu Fakorede, Udodi Onwuzurike	38.12	SB
4	7	Ghana	Benjamin Azamati, Joseph Paul Amoah, Mustapha Bokpin, Abdul-Rasheed Saminu	38.13	
5	3	England	Elliot Jones, Nicholas Walsh, Nethaneel Mitchell-Blake, Romell Glave	38.71	
6	2	Jamaica	Ackeem Blake, Rohan Watson, Christopher Taylor, Jerome Campbell	39.07	
7	1	Kenya	Mark Odhiambo, Zablon Ekwam, Meshack Babu, Elkana Kiprotich Sabila	39.74	
	6	South Africa	Mvuyo Moss, Cheswill Johnson, Bradley Nkoana, Akani Simbine	DQ	
