= Christopher Ius =

Australian sprinter (born 2000)

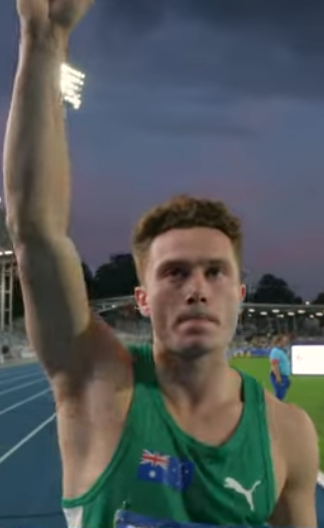
- At the 2025 Summer World University Games

Personal information
- Born: 10 February 2000 (age 26)

Sport
- Sport: Athletics
- Event: Sprint

Achievements and titles
- Personal bests: 60m: 6.71 (Wollongong, 2022); 100m: 10.18 (Perth, 2026); 200m: 20.26 (Sydney, 2026)
Medal record
Men's athletics
Representing Australia
Commonwealth Games
| Gold medal – first place | 2026 Glasgow | 4×100m relay |
Oceania Championships
| Silver medal – second place | 2026 Darwin | 200 m |

Christopher Ius (born 10 February 2000) is an Australian sprinter. In 2025, he was part of an Australian 4 x 100 metres relay team which set a new men’s national record and Oceania area record.

== Biography ==
In November 2020, as a 20 year-old, Ius lowered his 100 metres personal best by three-tenths of a seconds to 10.24 seconds whilst competing in Sydney. He later trained at the New South Wales Institute of Sport.

He placed was runner-up behind Jake Doran in the 200 metres at the 2023 Australian Athletics Championships in Brisbane. He made his Australian team debut in 2023, progressing to the semi-finals in the 100m and 200m at the delayed 2021 Summer World University Games held in Chengdu, China, in August 2023. The following year, he was named as a reserve for the Australian team at the 2024 Olympic Games.

In March 2025, he helped break the men's 4 x 100m relay Australian national record, running 37.87 seconds at the Sydney Track Classic, running the third leg alongside Lachlan Kennedy, Joshua Azzopardi, and Calab Law. Two weeks later, he placed third in the 200 metres at the Australian Athletics Championahips, finishing behind Gout Gout and Aidan Murphy. He competed for Australia at the 2025 World Athletics Relays in China in May 2025, helping the Australian men's 4x100m team qualify for the 2025 World Championships.

Ius was selected for the 2025 Summer World University Games in Bochum, Germany, qualifying for the final of the 200 metres and placing seventh overall. He also placed fourth overall with the Australian team in the final of the men’s 4 x 100 metres at the Games. He was subsequently selected for the relay pool by the Australian team for the 2025 World Athletics Championships in Tokyo, Japan.

On 11 April 2026, he was a finalist over 100 metres at the 2026 Australian Athletics Championships, and later placed fourth in a personal best 20.26 seconds (+1.7) in the final of the 200 metres. Selected for the 2026 World Athletics Relays in Botswana the following month, he ran alongside Joshua Azzopardi, Lachlan Kennedy and Rohan Browning and equalled the Oceania record of 37.87 seconds on the opening day, before placing fourth in the final in 38.00 seconds. Later that month, he won the silver medal over 200 m at the 2026 Oceania Athletics Championships in Darwin.

== Personal life ==
Ius studied for a Master of Physiotherapy degree at the University of Sydney.
