= Tapiwanashe Makarawu =

Zimbabwean athlete

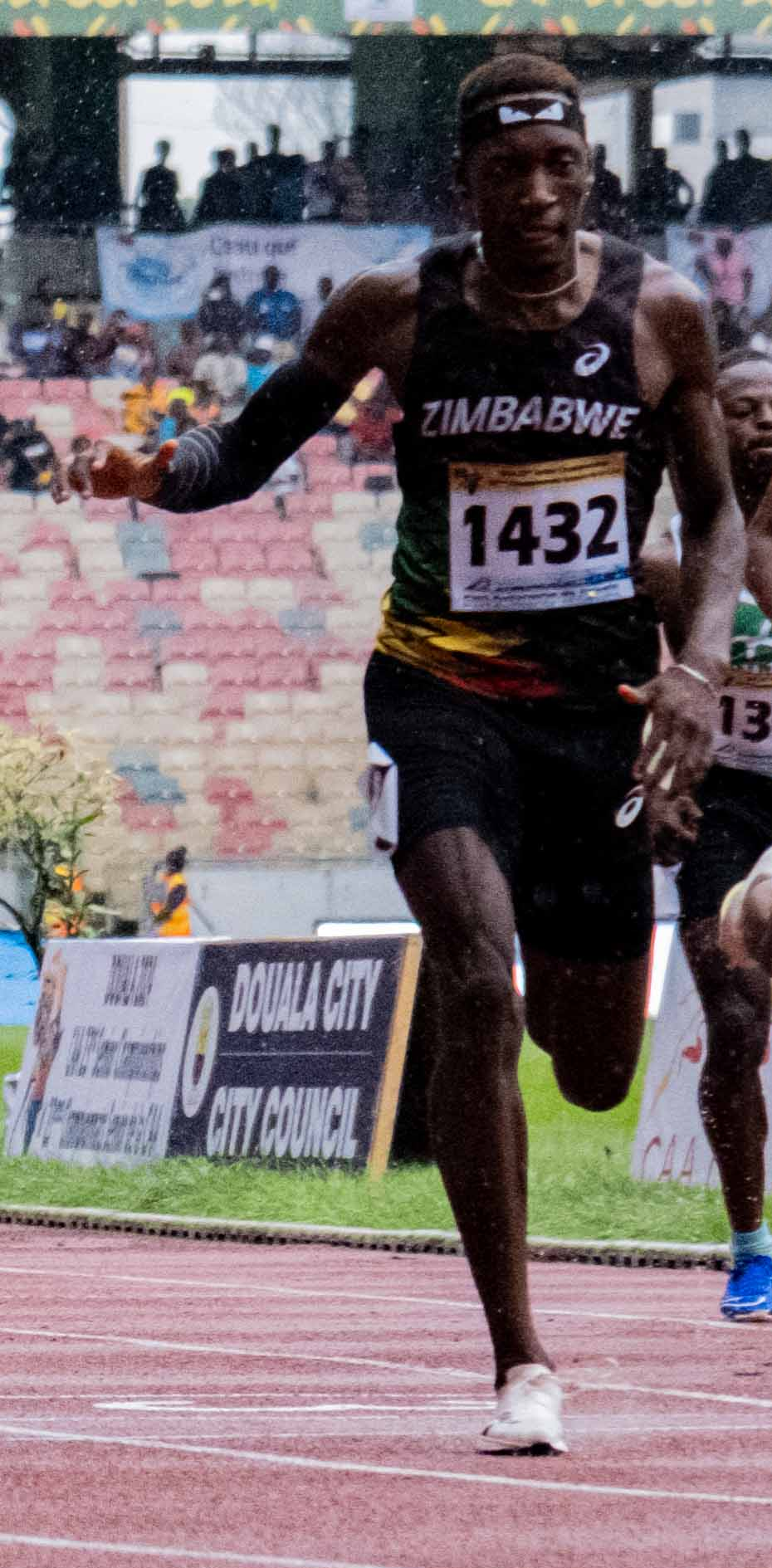

Personal information
- Nationality: Zimbabwe
- Born: 14 August 2000 (age 25)

Sport
- Sport: Athletics
- Event: Sprint

Achievements and titles
- Personal bests: 60m: 6.64 (Albuquerque, 2023); 100m: 10.05 (Hobbs, 2023); 200m: 19.84 NR (Eugene, Oregon, 2025)
Medal record
Men's athletics
Representing Zimbabwe
African Championships
Silver medal – second place	2024 Douala	200 m
Bronze medal – third place	2022 Mauritius	4×100 m

Tapiwanashe Carli Makarawu (born 14 August 2000) is a Zimbabwean sprinter. He reached the final of the 200 metres at the 2024 Summer Olympics in Paris and won the 2025 NCAA Outdoor Championships and 2025 NCAA Indoor Championships over 200 metres.

== Early life ==
Tapiwanashe Carlie Makarawu was born on August 14, 2000, in Zimbabwe. From a young age, he showed a keen interest in athletics, particularly in sprinting. He attended Mazowe High School and Bradley High School, where he began to hone his skills on the track. His talent was evident early on, and he quickly became one of the standout athletes at his school.

After completing high school, Makarawu enrolled at Bindura University of Science Education in 2021. His time at Bindura University was marked by significant achievements in athletics, which laid the foundation for his future career. In 2016, he joined the Zimbabwe National Sports Academy, where he received specialised training and support to further develop his sprinting abilities. In 2017, he was Zimbabwe’s Under-18 National Champion.

He attended Bradley High School, Mazowe High School and then Bindura University of Science Education in 2021. He later moved to the United States to attend New Mexico Junior College. He joined the Zimbabwe National Sports Academy in 2016.

== Biography ==
Makarawu set a new personal best and national record for the 200 metres in April 2023 when he ran 20.10 seconds in the Texas Tech Corky/Crofoot Shootout. This performance saw him break the Zimbabwean national record which was held by Brian Dzingai for almost 2 decades. At the same event he lowered his 100m personal best to 10.05 seconds.

Makarawu lowered his best to 19.98 seconds over 200 metres prior to a small injury at the start of the 2023 American summer. He competed at the 2023 World Athletics Championships in the men’s 200m event in Budapest. His heat included United States sprinter Noah Lyles and Jamaica’s Andrew Hudson, and Makarawu came fourth in 20.64s without qualifying for the semi-finals.

Makarawu ran an indoor 200m personal best of 20.29 seconds at the Texas International in Lubbock in January 2024. In April 2024, he lowered his outdoors personal best to 19.93 seconds.

Makarawu competed in the 200m at the 2024 Paris Olympics where he reached the final, placing sixth overall.

Makarawu won the 2025 NCAA Indoor Championships 200 metres title in Virginia Beach, running a time of 20.13 seconds on 15 March 2025. In June 2025, he also won the 2025 NCAA Outdoor Championships 200 metres title in Eugene, Oregon in a new national record time of 19.84 seconds to finish ahead of compatriot and fellow Olympian Makanakaishe Charamba.

In September 2025, he was a finalist in the 200 metres at the 2025 World Championships in Tokyo, Japan, placing seventh overall.

In Miramar on 4 April 2026, Makarawu ran 14.96 seconds (+1.3) for the 150 metres, finishing second to Kishane Thompson with both times beating the previous world best of Linford Christie in 1994, although faster times have been recorded on a straight track.
