= Calab Law =

Australian athlete (born 2003)

Personal information
- Nationality: Australian
- Born: Caleb Law; 31 December 2003 (age 22)

Sport
- Sport: Track and Field
- Event: 200 metres

Achievements and titles
- Personal bests: 100m: 10.17 (Perth, 2025); 200m: 20.21 (Sydney, 2026)
Medal record
Men's athletics
Representing Australia
Commonwealth Games
Gold medal – first place	2026 Glasgow	4×100m relay
Pacific Games
Gold medal – first place	2023 Honiara	100 metres
Gold medal – first place	2023 Honiara	200 metres
Oceania Championships
Gold medal – first place	2024 Suva	200 m
Silver medal – second place	2022 Mackay	200 m
World U20 Championships
Bronze medal – third place	2022 Cali	200 metres

Calab Law (born 31 December 2003) is an Australian sprinter. In 2024, he became Australian national champion over 200 metres.

== Biography ==
As an 18 year-old, Law won the silver medal behind compatriot Aidan Murphy in the 200 metres at the 2022 Oceania Athletics Championships. Law was selected for the Australian team for the 2022 World Championships and in doing so became the fifth youngest male ever selected for the championships. At the event he ran a knew personal best of 20.50 s in the 200 metres to progress into the semi-finals to become the first Australian teenager ever to qualify four a World or Olympic semi-final. The following month, he ran a new personal best of 20.42 s in a semi-final of the 200 metres at the 2022 World Athletics U20 Championships in Cali, Colombia. He finished third in the final in 20.48 s to obtain a bronze medal.

In November 2023, he won gold at the 2023 Pacific Games over 100m and 200m in Honiara. In April 2024, he won the Australian Athletics Championships title over 200 metres, winning in Adelaide in 20.54 seconds. He ran as part of the Australian 4 × 100 m relay team which qualified for the 2024 Paris Olympics at the 2024 World Relays Championships in Nassau, Bahamas. He competed in the 200m at the 2024 Paris Olympics. He also competed in the men's 4 × 100 m relay at the Games.

In March 2025, he helped break the Australian men's 4x100m relay national record, running 37.87 seconds at the Sydney Track Classic alongside Lachlan Kennedy, Joshua Azzopardi, and Christopher Ius. In April 2025, he ran a personal best 10.17 seconds for the 100 metres in finishing fourth at the Australian Championships in Perth. In September 2025, he competed in the 200 metres at the 2025 World Championships in Tokyo, Japan. He also ran in the men's 4 x 100 metres relay at the championships.

On 12 April 2026, he placed third behind Gout Gout and Aidan Murphy in the final of the 200 metres at the 2026 Australian Championships, in a personal best 20.21 seconds (+1.7). He was selected for the Australian team to compete at the 2026 World Athletics Relays in Gaborone, Botswana. She was named to the mixed 4 x 100 metres relay alongside Lakara Stallan, Jai Gordon and Chloe Mannix-Power with the team running 40.78 seconds on the opening day. The following day, the quartet won their heat to successfully qualify for the 2027 World Championships. In July, he was a semi-finalist in the 200 metres at the 2026 Commonwealth Games in Glasgow, Scotland. On 1 August, he was part of the gold medal winning team in the men's 4 × 100 m relay at the Games.

== Personal life ==
He is an Indigenous athlete and a member of the Wakka Wakka people from southern Queensland.
