= Adekalu Fakorede =

Nigerian sprinter (born 2003)

Adekalu Nicholas Fakorede
Personal information
- Born: 28 June 2003 (age 23)

Sport
- Sport: Athletics
- Event: Sprint

Achievements and titles
- Personal bests: 60m: 6.56 (2025); 100m: 9.98 (2026); 200m: 20.74 (2026)
Medal record
Representing Nigeria
Men's athletics
Commonwealth Games
Bronze medal – third place	2026 Glasgow	4×100m relay

Adekalu Nicholas Fakorede (born 28 June 2003) is a Nigerian sprinter.

== Biography ==
Born in Ekiti State, Fakorede is popularly known as "Fako". In June 2022, he was part of the Nigerian 4 x 100 metres relay team which placed fourth at the 2022 African Championships in Athletics in Mauritius. He was part of the Nigerian team which placed fifth in the 4 x 100 metres relay at the 2022 World Athletics U20 Championships in August 2022, in Cali, Colombia. In December 2022, competing for Rivers State, Fakorede won the men's 100 metres race at the 21st National Sports Festival (NSF) in Asaba, running 10.25 seconds.

Competing for Mississippi State University in the United States, he ran a personal best for the 60 metres of 6.56 second at the 2025 SEC Indoor Championships. That month, he was a finalist over 60 metres at the 2025 NCAA Indoor Championships, running 6.59 seconds in the final in Virginia Beach. In August, he placed third in 10.07 second at the Nigerian Athletics Championships over 100 metres in Abeokuta.

In April 2026, he ran a personal best of 10.04 seconds for the 100 metres at the Tom Jones Memorial. Running at the NCAA East Regionals in May 2026, he ran 10.08 seconds for the 100 metres in Lexington, Kentucky. The following month, he ran the opening leg as Mississippi State secured a fifth-place finish in a time of 39.07 seconds at the 2026 NCAA Outdoor Championships. He broke the 10-second barrier for the 100 metres for the first time in June 2026, running 9.98 seconds at the Nigerian Championships and Commonwealth Games Trials, placing second in the final to Favour Ashe. It was the first time two Nigerian men had run below 10 seconds since Deji Aliu and Uchenna Emedolu achieved the feat at the 2003 African Games in Abuja. Competing at the 2026 Commonwealth Games in Glasgow, Scotland, he won the bronze medal in the men's 4 × 100 m relay. He also competed in the 100 metres at the Games, reaching the semi-finals.
