= Rohan Browning =

Australian sprinter (born 1997)

- Browning at the 2026 Commonwealth Games

Personal information
- Nickname: The Flying Mullet
- Nationality: Australian
- Born: 31 December 1997 (age 28) Crows Nest, New South Wales, Australia
- Education: Trinity Grammar School
- Height: 1.81 m (5 ft 11 in)

Sport
- Event: 100 metres
- Coached by: Jack Edwards
- Retired: 2026; 0 years ago
Medal record
Men's athletics
Representing Australia
Commonwealth Games
Gold medal – first place	2026 Glasgow	4 × 100 metre relay
Oceania Championships
Bronze medal – third place	2024 Suva	100 m

Rohan Browning (born 31 December 1997) is an Australian former sprinter. He represented his country in the 4 × 100 metres relay at the 2017 World Championships without qualifying for the final. He also competed in the 100 meters at the 2018 Commonwealth Games, narrowly missing the final. Rohan currently studies a Bachelor of Laws at the University of Sydney.

On 16 January 2021, Browning ran the 100 metres in a wind-assisted time of 9.96 seconds (the tailwind being +3.3 m/s). This made Browning the second Australian sprinter to break the 10-second barrier after Patrick Johnson, who first broke the barrier back in 2003 with a 'wind-legal' and thus Australian record time of 9.93 seconds.

On 31 July 2021, Rohan ran 10.01 s in winning a 100 metre heat at the 2020 Tokyo Olympic Games, the fastest 100 metres ever by an Australian at the Olympic Games and the second fastest 'wind-legal' 100m sprint time by an Australian. He also competed at the 2024 Paris Olympic Games.

On 23 September 2026, Rohan announced his retirement from competition. He ended his career with a final gold medal from the 4 × 100 metres relay at the 2026 Commonwealth Games.

== Early years ==
Being born on December 31, Browning called it "the worst birthday in sport." He was always younger than his rivals and athletics-wise was a late developer. He played local rugby and did one year of Little Athletics. When he was 16-years-of-age he started training for athletics. It was his move to Trinity Grammar School that gave him his impetus. This is where he met his current coach and Olympian Andrew Murphy. Under his guidance, Browning's skill developed and he ran 10.47 for the 100m and a wind assisted 10.18, before he was 17-years-old. His main rivals were Tasmanian Jack Hale and Trae Williams.

Browning competed in the 2018 Commonwealth Games trials and missed the final by one-thousandth of a second. After the games he did not compete again for 9 months due to an Achilles injury. In 2019 Browning ran 10.08, the equal third-fastest Australian ever. He was selected for the 2019 World Championships, Australia's first representative in the event for 12 years.

== International competitions ==
Year	Competition	Venue	Position	Event	Notes
Representing Australia
2017	World Championships	London, United Kingdom	12th (h)	4 × 100 m relay	38.88
2017	Universiade	Taipei, Taiwan	28th (h)	100 m	10.60
2017	Universiade	Taipei, Taiwan	12th (h)	4 × 100 m relay	40.33
2018	Commonwealth Games	Gold Coast, Australia	9th (sf)	100 m	10.26
2018	Commonwealth Games	Gold Coast, Australia	4th	4 × 100 m relay	38.58
2019	World Championships	Doha, Qatar	40th (h)	100 m	10.40
2021	Olympic Games	Tokyo, Japan	13th (sf)	100 m	10.09
2022	World Championships	Eugene, United States	35th (h)	100 m	10.22
2022	Commonwealth Games	Birmingham, England	6th	100 m	10.20
2022	Commonwealth Games	Birmingham, England	DNF (h)	4 × 100 m relay	DNF
2023	World Championships	Budapest, Hungary	14th (sf)	100 m	10.11
2024	Olympic Games	Paris, France	45th (h)	100 m	10.29
2025	World Championships	Tokyo, Japan	19th (h)	100 m	10.16
2025	World Championships	Tokyo, Japan	7th (h)	4 × 100 m relay	38.21^{1}
2026	Commonwealth Games	Glasgow, United Kingdom	16th (sf)	100 m	10.14
2026	Commonwealth Games	Glasgow, United Kingdom	1st	4 × 100 m relay	38.07

^{1}Did not finish in the final

== Personal bests ==
Outdoor:

Event	Time (s)	Wind	Date	Venue/Event	Notes
60 m	6.55 s	+ 0.1 m/s	16 January 2021	Wollongong, Australia	
100 m	10.01 s	+ 0.8 m/s	31 July 2021	2020 Summer Olympics	
100 m	10.01 s	+ 1.5 m/s	12 April 2025	Perth, Australia	(10.001 s)
100m w	9.96 s	+ 3.3 m/s	16 January 2021	Wollongong, Australia	
200 m	20.71 s	0.0 m/s	21 January 2018	Canberra, Australia	
200 m	20.71 s	0.9 m/s	23 February 2023	Melbourne, Australia	
