= Vietnam at the World Athletics Championships =

- WA code: VIE
- National federation: Vietnam Athletics Federation
- Website: yemnoc.org/en/federations/t32.html
- Medals: Gold 0 Silver 0 Bronze 0 Total 0

World Athletics Championships appearances (overview)
- 1983; 1987; 1991; 1993; 1995; 1997; 1999; 2001; 2003; 2005–2007; 2009; 2011; 2013; 2015; 2017; 2019; 2022; 2023; 2025

Vietnam has competed at the World Athletics Championships on eleven occasions, and did not send a delegation for the 1987, 1997, 2001, 2005, and 2007 editions. Its competing country code is VIE. The country has not won any medals at the competition and as of 2017 no Vietnamese athlete has progressed beyond the first round of an event.

== 2019 ==
Vietnam competed at the 2019 World Championships in Athletics in Doha, Qatar, from 27 September 2019.

Athlete	Event	Preliminary Round		Heat		Semifinal		Final	
Athlete	Event	Result	Rank	Result	Rank	Result	Rank	Result	Rank
Ngần Ngọc Nghĩa	Men's 100 metres	10.67	9	DNS		Did not advance			
