= Vietnam at the 2025 World Athletics Championships =

- Flag of Vietnam
- WA code: VIE

in Tokyo, Japan 13 September 2025 – 21 September 2025
- Competitors: 1 (1 woman)
- Medals: Gold 0 Silver 0 Bronze 0 Total 0

World Athletics Championships appearances (overview)
- 1983; 1987; 1991; 1993; 1995; 1997; 1999; 2001; 2003; 2005–2007; 2009; 2011; 2013; 2015; 2017; 2019; 2022; 2023; 2025

Vietnam competed at the 2025 World Athletics Championships in Tokyo, Japan, which were held from 13 to 21 September 2025. The athlete delegation of the country consisted of one competitor, hurdler Huỳnh Thị Mỹ Tiên who competed in the women's 100 metres hurdles. Huỳnh qualified upon being selected by the Vietnam Athletics Federation. In the heats, she placed last and failed to advance further.

== Background ==
The 2025 World Athletics Championships in Tokyo, Japan, were held from 19 to 27 August 2023. The Championships were held at the Japan National Stadium. To qualify for the World Championships, athletes had to reach an entry standard (e.g. time or distance), place in a specific position at select competitions, be a wild card entry, or qualify through their World Athletics Ranking at the end of the qualification period.

As Vietnam did not meet any of the four standards, they could send either one male or one female athlete in one event of the Championships who has not yet qualified. The Vietnam Athletics Federation selected hurdler Huỳnh Thị Mỹ Tiên who would compete in the women's 100 metres hurdles. Previously, she had placed first in the event at the Vietnamese Athletics Championships and competed in the finals of the event at the 2025 Asian Athletics Championships. This was her first time competing at the World Championships.

== Results ==
Key

- Q = Qualified for the next round
- q = Qualified for the next round as a fastest loser or, in field events, by position without achieving the qualifying target
- NR = National record
- PB = Personal best
- SB = Season best
- N/A = Round not applicable for the event

=== Women ===
Huỳnh competed in the second heat of the first round heats of the event on 14 September against seven other hurdlers. There, she recorded a time of 13.77 seconds and placed last, failing to advance further as she was not within the top three of her heat nor was she one of the next six fastest hurdlers.

Track and road events

Athlete	Event	Heat		Semifinal		Final	
Athlete	Event	Result	Rank	Result	Rank	Result	Rank
Huỳnh Thị Mỹ Tiên	100 metres hurdles	13.77	8	Did not advance			
