= Honduras at the 2022 World Athletics Championships =

- Flag of Honduras
- WA code: HON

in Eugene, United States 15 July 2022 – 24 July 2022
- Competitors: 1 (1 man)
- Medals: Gold 0 Silver 0 Bronze 0 Total 0

World Athletics Championships appearances
- 1983; 1987; 1991; 1993; 1995; 1997; 1999; 2001; 2003; 2005; 2007; 2009; 2011; 2013; 2015; 2017; 2019; 2022; 2023; 2025

Honduras competed at the 2022 World Athletics Championships in Eugene, Oregon, United States, which were held from 15 to 24 July 2022. The athlete delegation of the country was composed of one competitor, sprinter Melique García. García competed in the men's 100 metres and started in the preliminary heats before being eliminated in the first round.

== Background ==
The 2022 World Athletics Championships in Eugene, Oregon, United States, were held from 15 to 24 July 2022. To qualify for the World Championships, athletes had to reach an entry standard (e.g. time and distance), place in a specific position at select competitions, be a wild card entry, or qualify through their World Athletics Ranking at the end of the qualification period.

As the Honduras did not meet any of the four standards, they could send either one male or one female athlete in one event of the Championships who has not yet qualified. The Honduran National Athletics Federation selected sprinter Melique García who held a personal best of 10.50 seconds and a season's best of 10.84 seconds prior to the Championships. Previously, Garcia had competed for the nation at the 2019 IAAF World Athletics Championships held in Doha, Qatar, in the same event.

== Results ==
Key

- Q = Qualified for the next round
- q = Qualified for the next round as a fastest loser or, in field events, by position without achieving the qualifying target
- NR = National record
- PB = Personal best
- SB = Season best
- N/A = Round not applicable for the event

=== Men ===
García first competed in the preliminary rounds of the men's 100 metres on 15 July 2022 in the fourth round against six other competitors. There, he recorded a time of 10.70 seconds for a season's best and placed third, advancing further as his time was within the next six fastest athletes outside the top two of their heats. During the first round, he competed in the fifth heat against seven other competitors. There, he recorded a time of 10.88 seconds and placed last, failing to advance further to the semifinals as only the top three of each heat and the next three fastest would only be able to do so.

Track and road events

Athlete	Event	Preliminary		Heat		Semi-final		Final	
Athlete	Event	Result	Rank	Result	Rank	Result	Rank	Result	Rank
Melique García	100 metres	10.70 SB	3 q	10.88	8	Did not advance			
