= Honduras at the 2023 World Athletics Championships =

- Flag of Honduras
- WA code: HON

in Budapest, Hungary 19 August 2023 – 27 August 2023
- Competitors: 1 (1 man and 0 women)
- Medals: Gold 0 Silver 0 Bronze 0 Total 0

World Athletics Championships appearances
- 1983; 1987; 1991; 1993; 1995; 1997; 1999; 2001; 2003; 2005; 2007; 2009; 2011; 2013; 2015; 2017; 2019; 2022; 2023; 2025

Honduras competed at the 2023 World Athletics Championships in Budapest, Hungary, which were held from 19 to 27 August 2023. The athlete delegation of the country was composed of one competitor, hurdler Melique Garcia who would compete in the men's 100 metres. He qualified upon being selected by the Honduran National Athletics Federation. In the preliminaries, he placed fourth and failed to advance to the heats.

== Background ==
The 2023 World Athletics Championships in Budapest, Hungary, were held from 19 to 27 August 2023. The Championships were held at the National Athletics Centre. To qualify for the World Championships, athletes had to reach an entry standard (e.g. time or distance), place in a specific position at select competitions, be a wild card entry, or qualify through their World Athletics Ranking at the end of the qualification period.

As the Honduras did not meet any of the four standards, they could send either one male or one female athlete in one event of the Championships who has not yet qualified. The Honduran National Athletics Federation selected sprinter Melique Garcia who held a personal best of 10.50 seconds in the 100 metres prior to the Championships. This was Garcia's third consecutive appearance for Honduras at the World Athletics Championships, competing previously in 2022 and 2019. Outside of competitive sport, Garcia works as a football coach and IT analyst.

== Results ==
Key

- Q = Qualified for the next round
- q = Qualified for the next round as a fastest loser or, in field events, by position without achieving the qualifying target
- NR = National record
- PB = Personal best
- SB = Season best
- N/A = Round not applicable for the event

=== Men ===
Garcia competed in the preliminaries of the men's 100 metres on 19 August against seven other athletes in the third heat. There, he recorded a time of 10.96 seconds and placed fourth, failing to advance to the first round.

Track and road events

Athlete	Event	Preliminary		Heat		Semifinal		Final	
Athlete	Event	Result	Rank	Result	Rank	Result	Rank	Result	Rank
Melique Garcia	100 metres	10.96	4	Did not advance					
