= Honduras at the 2019 World Athletics Championships =

Honduras at the 2019 World Championships in Athletics
- WA code: HON

in Doha
- Competitors: 1 (1 man)
- Medals: Gold 0 Silver 0 Bronze 0 Total 0

World Championships in Athletics appearances
- 1983; 1987; 1991; 1993; 1995; 1997; 1999; 2001; 2003; 2005; 2007; 2009; 2011; 2013; 2015; 2017; 2019; 2022; 2023; 2025

Honduras competed at the 2019 World Athletics Championships in Doha, Qatar, which were held from 27 September to 6 October 2019. The athlete delegation of the country was composed of one competitor, sprinter Melique García who was selected by the Honduran National Athletics Federation and would compete in the men's 100 metres. There, he placed third out of the seven competitors that participated in his preliminary heat and failed to advance further to the heats.

== Background ==
The 2019 World Athletics Championships in Doha, Qatar, were held from 27 September to 6 October 2019. The Championships were held at the Khalifa International Stadium. To qualify for the World Championships, athletes had to reach an entry standard (e.g. time or distance), place in a specific position at select competitions, be a wild card entry, or qualify through their World Athletics Ranking at the end of the qualification period.

As Honduras did not meet any of the four standards, they could send either one male or one female athlete in one event of the Championships who has not yet qualified. The Honduran National Athletics Federation selected sprinter Melique García who would compete in the men's 100 metres. In the lead-up to the Championships, Salazar held a personal best of 10.50 seconds and a season's best of 10.76 seconds in the event.

== Result ==
Key

- Note–Ranks given for track events are for the entire round
- Q = Qualified for the next round
- q = Qualified for the next round as a fastest loser or, in field events, by position without achieving the qualifying target
- NR = National record
- GR = Games record
- PB = Personal best
- SB = Season best
- DNF = Did not finish
- DNS = Did not start
- NM = No mark
- N/A = Round not applicable for the event
- Bye = Athlete not required to compete in round

=== Men ===
García competed in the preliminaries of the men's 100 metres on 27 September 2019 in the third heat against six other athletes. There, he recorded a time of 10.76 seconds and placed third, failing to advance to the heats as only the athletes who had placed first in a heat and the next five fastest qualified.

Track and road events

Athlete	Event	Preliminaries		Heat		Semifinal		Final	
Athlete	Event	Result	Rank	Result	Rank	Result	Rank	Result	Rank
Melique García	100 m	10.76	12	Did not advance					
