= Honduras at the 2025 World Athletics Championships =

- Flag of Honduras
- WA code: HON

in Tokyo, Japan 13 September 2025 – 21 September 2025
- Competitors: 1 (1 woman)
- Medals: Gold 0 Silver 0 Bronze 0 Total 0

World Athletics Championships appearances
- 1983; 1987; 1991; 1993; 1995; 1997; 1999; 2001; 2003; 2005; 2007; 2009; 2011; 2013; 2015; 2017; 2019; 2022; 2023; 2025

Honduras competed at the 2025 World Athletics Championships in Tokyo, Japan, which were held from 13 to 21 September 2025. The athlete delegation of the territory consisted of sprinter Rori Lowe. She competed in the women's 100 metres and placed eighth in her heat, failing to advance further but set a national record in the distance.

== Background ==
The 2025 World Athletics Championships in Tokyo, Japan, were held from 19 to 27 August 2023. The Championships were held at the Japan National Stadium. To qualify for the World Championships, athletes had to reach an entry standard (e.g. time or distance), place in a specific position at select competitions, be a wild card entry, or qualify through their World Athletics Ranking at the end of the qualification period.

As Honduras did not meet any of the four standards, the Honduran National Athletics Federation could send either one male or one female athlete in one event of the Championships who has not yet qualified. The Federation selected sprinter Rori Lowe. This was Lowe's first appearance for Honduras at an edition of the Championships. Previously, she held American sporting nationality but was eligible to represent Honduras beginning on 1 August 2025. She was entered to compete in the women's 100 metres.

== Results ==
Key

- Q = Qualified for the next round
- q = Qualified for the next round as a fastest loser or, in field events, by position without achieving the qualifying target
- NR = National record
- PB = Personal best
- SB = Season best
- N/A = Round not applicable for the event

=== Women ===
Lowe competed in the qualifying heats of the women's 100 metres on 13 September 2025 in the sixth heat against eight other competitors, namely: Leah Bertrand, Zaynab Dosso, Viktória Forster, Amy Hunt, Edna Ngandula, Gorete Semedo, Destiny Smith-Barnett, and Kayla White. There, Lowe recorded a time of 11.93 seconds and placed eighth in the heat, failing to advance further into the semifinals as she was outside of the top three of her heat and her time was not fast enough if she were outside of the top three. Though, she set a new national record for Honduras with her time.

Track and road events

Athlete	Event	Heat		Semifinal		Final	
Athlete	Event	Result	Rank	Result	Rank	Result	Rank
Rori Lowe	100 metres	11.93 NR	8	Did not advance			
