= Honduras at the 2017 World Championships in Athletics =

- Flag of Honduras
- WA code: HON
- National federation: Honduran National Athletics Federation
- Website: atletismohonduras.com (in Spanish)

in London, United Kingdom 4–13 August 2017
- Competitors: 1 (1 man) in 1 event
- Medals: Gold 0 Silver 0 Bronze 0 Total 0

World Championships in Athletics appearances
- 1983; 1987; 1991; 1993; 1995; 1997; 1999; 2001; 2003; 2005; 2007; 2009; 2011; 2013; 2015; 2017; 2019; 2022; 2023; 2025

Honduras competed at the 2017 World Championships in Athletics in London, United Kingdom, which were held from 4 to 13 August 2017. The athlete delegation consisted of one competitor, sprinter Rolando Palacios. There, he competed in the men's 100 metres and failed to make it past the preliminaries. This was Palacios' sixth and last appearance for Honduras at the World Championships.

== Background ==
The 2017 World Championships in Athletics were held at London Stadium in London, United Kingdom. Under the auspices of the International Amateur Athletic Federation, this was the sixteenth edition of the World Championships. It was held from 4 to 13 August 2017 and had 48 different events. Among the competing nations was Honduras. For this edition of the World Championships in Athletics, sprinter Rolando Palacios was selected to compete. Prior to the World Championships, he had a personal best of 10.22 seconds and a season's best of 10.54 seconds in the men's 100 metres, his entered event. This was Palacio's sixth and last appearance for Honduras at the World Championships.

== Results ==
=== Men ===
Palacios competed in the preliminary rounds of the men's 100 metres on 4 August 2017 in the third heat against six other competitors, namely: Bui Ba Hanh, Mario Burke, Said Gilani, Paul Ma'unikeni, Abdullah Abkar Mohammed, and Ján Volko. There, Palacios recorded a time of 10.73 seconds and placed fourth, failing to advance to the qualifying heats as only the top three of each heat and the next two fastest sprinters would be able to do so.

Track and road events

Athlete	Event	Preliminaries		Heat		Semifinal		Final	
Athlete	Event	Result	Rank	Result	Rank	Result	Rank	Result	Rank
Rolando Palacios	100 metres	10.73	15	Did not advance					
