= Indonesia at the 2023 World Athletics Championships =

- WA code: INA
- National federation: Indonesian Athletics Association

in Budapest, Hungary 19–27 August 2023
- Competitors: 1 (0 men and 1 woman) in 1 event
- Medals: Gold 0 Silver 0 Bronze 0 Total 0

World Athletics Championships appearances
- 1983; 1987; 1991; 1993; 1995; 1997; 1999; 2001; 2003; 2005; 2007; 2009; 2011; 2013; 2015; 2017; 2019; 2022; 2023; 2025

Indonesia competed at the 2023 World Athletics Championships in Budapest, Hungary, which were held from 19 to 27 August 2023. The athlete delegation of the country was composed of one competitor, hurdler Dina Aulia who competed in the women's 100 metres hurdles. She qualified for the Championships upon being selected by the Indonesian Athletics Association. In the heats, she placed last and failed to advance further.

== Background ==
The 2023 World Athletics Championships in Budapest, Hungary, were held from 19 to 27 August 2023. The Championships were held at the National Athletics Centre. To qualify for the World Championships, athletes had to reach an entry standard (e.g. time or distance), place in a specific position at select competitions, be a wild card entry, or qualify through their World Athletics Ranking at the end of the qualification period.

As Indonesia did not meet any of the four standards, they could send either one male or one female athlete in one event of the Championships who has not yet qualified. The Indonesian Athletics Association selected hurdler Dina Aulia, who would compete in the women's 100 metres hurdles. In the entry list for the Championships, she held a personal best of 13.44 seconds and a season's best of 13.51 seconds in the event. Aulia's coach, Fitri Haryadi, stated during an interview that her main goal at these Championships was to restore her confidence after a poor finish at the 2021 Summer World University Games. They left from Jakarta to go to Budapest on 18 August.

== Results ==
Key

- Q = Qualified for the next round
- q = Qualified for the next round as a fastest loser or, in field events, by position without achieving the qualifying target
- NR = National record
- PB = Personal best
- SB = Season best
- N/A = Round not applicable for the event

=== Women ===
Aulia competed in the third first round heat on 22 August against eight other hurdlers. There, she recorded a time of 13.54 seconds and placed last, failing to advance further as she was not within the top four of her heat nor was she one of the four next fastest athletes.

Track and road events

Athlete	Event	Heat		Semi-final		Final	
Athlete	Event	Result	Rank	Result	Rank	Result	Rank
Dina Aulia	100 metres hurdles	13.54	9	Did not advance			
