= Vietnam at the 2022 World Athletics Championships =

- WA code: VIE
- National federation: VAF
- Website: dienkinh.vn

in Eugene, United States 15–24 July 2022
- Competitors: 1 (0 men and 1 woman)

World Athletics Championships appearances (overview)
- 1983; 1987; 1991; 1993; 1995; 1997; 1999; 2001; 2003; 2005–2007; 2009; 2011; 2013; 2015; 2017; 2019; 2022; 2023; 2025

Vietnam competed at the 2022 World Athletics Championships in Eugene, United States, from 15 to 24 July 2022. It entered 1 athlete.

== Results ==
=== Women ===
Key

- Q = Qualified for the next round
- q = Qualified for the next round as a fastest loser or, in field events, by position without achieving the qualifying target
- NR = National record
- PB = Personal best
- SB = Season best
- N/A = Round not applicable for the event

Track and Field Events

Athlete	Event	Heat		Semi-final		Final	
Athlete	Event	Result	Rank	Result	Rank	Result	Rank
Quách Thị Lan	400 metres hurdles	58.84	35	did not advance			
