= Honduras at the 2011 World Championships in Athletics =

- WA code: HON
- National federation: Federación Nacional Hondureña de Atletismo

in Daegu
- Competitors: 2
- Medals: Gold 0 Silver 0 Bronze 0 Total 0

World Championships in Athletics appearances
- 1983; 1987; 1991; 1993; 1995; 1997; 1999; 2001; 2003; 2005; 2007; 2009; 2011; 2013; 2015; 2017; 2019; 2022; 2023; 2025

Honduras competed at the 2011 World Championships in Athletics in Daegu, South Korea, which were held from 27 August to 4 September 2011. The athlete delegation consisted of two competitors, sprinter Rolando Palacios and hurdler Jeimy Bernárdez. Palacios competed in the men's 200 metres while Bernárdez competed in the women's 100 metres hurdles. Both of them failed to make it past the qualifying heats of their respective events.

== Background ==
The 2011 World Championships in Athletics were held at Daegu Stadium in Daegu, Germany. Under the auspices of the International Amateur Athletic Federation, this was the thirteenth edition of the World Championships. It was held from 27 August to 4 September 2011 and had 47 different events. Among the competing nations was Honduras. For this edition of the World Championships in Athletics, sprinter Rolando Palacios and hurdler Jeimy Bernárdez competed for the nation.

== Results ==
=== Men ===
Palacios competed in the qualifying heats of the men's 200 metres on 2 September 2011 in the third heat against seven other competitors. There, he recorded a time of 21.22 seconds and placed sixth, failing to advance further as only the top three of each heat and the next three fastest athletes would only be able to do so.

Athlete	Event	Heat		Semifinal		Final	
Athlete	Event	Result	Rank	Result	Rank	Result	Rank
Rolando Palacios	200 m	21.22	6	Did not advance			

=== Women ===
Bernárdez competed in the qualifying heats of the women's 100 metres hurdles on 2 September 2011 in the third heat against seven other competitors. There, she recorded a time of 14.45 seconds and placed last, failing to advance further as only the top four of each heat and the next four fastest athletes would only be able to do so.

Athlete	Event	Heat		Semifinal		Final	
Athlete	Event	Result	Rank	Result	Rank	Result	Rank
Jeimy Bernárdez	100 m hurdles	14.45	8	Did not advance			
