= Bhutan at the 2019 World Athletics Championships =

- WA code: BHU

in Doha, Qatar 27 September 2019 – 6 October 2019
- Competitors: 1 (1 man) in 1 event
- Medals: Gold 0 Silver 0 Bronze 0 Total 0

World Athletics Championships appearances
- 1999; 2001–2007; 2009; 2011; 2013; 2015; 2017; 2019; 2022; 2023

Bhutan competed at the 2019 World Athletics Championships in Doha, Qatar, from 27 September to 6 October 2019.

== Results ==
Key

- Q = Qualified for the next round
- q = Qualified for the next round as a fastest loser or, in field events, by position without achieving the qualifying target
- NR = National record
- PB = Personal best
- SB = Season best
- N/A = Round not applicable for the event

=== Men ===
Track and road events

Athlete	Event	Preliminary Round		Heat		Semifinal		Final	
Athlete	Event	Result	Rank	Result	Rank	Result	Rank	Result	Rank
Dinesh Kumar Dhakal	100 metres	11.64 NR	24	Did not advance					
