= Honduras at the 2015 World Championships in Athletics =

- WA code: HON

in Beijing
- Competitors: 1
- Medals: Gold 0 Silver 0 Bronze 0 Total 0

World Championships in Athletics appearances
- 1983; 1987; 1991; 1993; 1995; 1997; 1999; 2001; 2003; 2005; 2007; 2009; 2011; 2013; 2015; 2017; 2019; 2022; 2023; 2025

Honduras competed at the 2015 World Championships in Athletics in Beijing, China, which were held from 22 to 30 August 2015. The athlete delegation consisted of one sole competitor, sprinter Rolando Palacios, who was competing in his fifth appearance for the nation at the World Championships. He competed in the men's 200 metres but was disqualified during the qualifying heats due to lane infringement.

== Background ==
The 2015 World Championships in Athletics in Beijing, China were held from 22 to 30 August 2015. The Championships were held in the Beijing National Stadium. To qualify for the World Championships, athletes had to reach an entry standard (e.g. time or distance), place in a specific position at select competitions, be a wild card entry, or qualify through their World Athletics Ranking at the end of the qualification period.

As Honduras did not meet any of the four standards, the Honduran National Athletics Federation could send either one male or one female athlete in one event of the Championships who has not yet qualified. The Federation selected sprinter Rolando Palacios who had a season's best of 21.06 seconds in the men's 200 metres, his entered event. This was Palacios' fifth appearance for Honduras at the World Championships, first competing in 2005.

== Results ==
=== Men ===
Palacios competed in the qualifying heats of the men's 200 metres on 25 August 2015 in the third heat against eight other competitors, namely: Usain Bolt, Mauriel Carty, Yancarlos Martínez, Julius Morris, Julian Reus, Sydney Siame, Roberto Skyers, and Teray Smith. There, he was disqualified after he had crossed onto the lane of his opponent.

Track and road events

Athlete	Event	Heat		Semifinal		Final	
Athlete	Event	Result	Rank	Result	Rank	Result	Rank
Rolando Palacios	200 metres	DQ		did not advance			
