= Bhutan at the 2011 World Championships in Athletics =

- WA code: BHU
- National federation: Bhutan Amateur Athletic Federation

in Daegu
- Competitors: 1
- Medals: Gold 0 Silver 0 Bronze 0 Total 0

World Championships in Athletics appearances
- 1999; 2001–2007; 2009; 2011; 2013; 2015; 2017; 2019; 2022; 2023

Bhutan competed at the 2011 World Championships in Athletics from August 27 to September 4 in Daegu, South Korea. One athlete was announced to represent the country in the event.

== Results ==
=== Men ===
Athlete	Event	Preliminaries		Heats		Semifinals		Final	
Athlete	Event	Time Width Height	Rank	Time Width Height	Rank	Time Width Height	Rank	Time Width Height	Rank
Sangay Wangchuk	Marathon							2:38:33 NR	51
