= Bhutan at the 2009 World Championships in Athletics =

- WA code: BHU

in Berlin
- Competitors: 1
- Medals: Gold 0 Silver 0 Bronze 0 Total 0

World Championships in Athletics appearances
- 1999; 2001–2007; 2009; 2011; 2013; 2015; 2017; 2019; 2022; 2023

Bhutan competed at the 2009 World Championships in Athletics from 15 to 23 August in Berlin.

== Team selection ==
Track and road events

Event	Athletes	
Event	Men	Women
Marathon	Sangay Wangchuk	

== Results ==
=== Men ===
Event	Athletes	Final	
Event	Athletes	Result	Rank
Marathon	Sangay Wangchuk	2:47:55 NR	70
