= Bhutan at the 2022 World Athletics Championships =

- Flag of Bhutan
- WA code: BHU

in Eugene, United States 15 July 2022 – 24 July 2022
- Competitors: 1 (1 man)
- Medals: Gold 0 Silver 0 Bronze 0 Total 0

World Athletics Championships appearances
- 1999; 2001–2007; 2009; 2011; 2013; 2015; 2017; 2019; 2022; 2023–2025

Bhutan competed at the 2022 World Athletics Championships in Eugene, Oregon, United States, which were held from 15 to 24 July 2022. The athlete delegation of the country was composed of one competitor, sprinter Mipham Yoezer Gurung who competed in the men's 100 metres. He qualified for the Championships upon being selected by the Bhutan Amateur Athletic Federation. In the preliminary round heats, he set a personal best though placed laces, failing to advance further.

== Background ==
The 2022 World Athletics Championships in Eugene, Oregon, United States, were held from 15 to 24 July 2022. To qualify for the World Championships, athletes had to reach an entry standard (e.g. time and distance), place in a specific position at select competitions, be a wild card entry, or qualify through their World Athletics Ranking at the end of the qualification period.

As Bhutan did not meet any of the four standards, they could send either one male or one female athlete in one event of the Championships who has not yet qualified. The Bhutan Amateur Athletic Federation selected sprinter Mipham Yoezer Gurung, who would compete in the men's 100 metres. Before the Championships, Gurung competed for Bhutan at the 2018 IAAF World U20 Championships and held the national record in the high jump.

== Results ==
Key

- Q = Qualified for the next round
- q = Qualified for the next round as a fastest loser or, in field events, by position without achieving the qualifying target
- NR = National record
- PB = Personal best
- SB = Season best
- N/A = Round not applicable for the event

=== Men ===
Gurung competed in the first preliminary round heat of the men's 100 metres on 15 July against six other sprinters. There, he recorded a time of 11.86 seconds and set a new personal best in the event. He placed last in his heat and failed to advance further to the first round heats as he was not within the top two of his heat nor was he one of the six next fastest athletes. His time was the second slowest in the preliminary round heats.

Track and road events

| Athlete | Event | Preliminary | | Heat | | Semi-final | | Final | |
| Athlete | Event | Result | Rank | Result | Rank | Result | Rank | Result | Rank |
|---|---|---|---|---|---|---|---|---|---|
| Mipham Yoezer Gurung | 100 metres | 11.86 (+0.5) | 24 | Did not advance | | | | | |
