= Honduras at the 2009 World Championships in Athletics =

- WA code: HON

in Berlin, Germany
- Competitors: 2 (1 man, 1 woman)
- Medals: Gold 0 Silver 0 Bronze 0 Total 0

World Championships in Athletics appearances
- 1983; 1987; 1991; 1993; 1995; 1997; 1999; 2001; 2003; 2005; 2007; 2009; 2011; 2013; 2015; 2017; 2019; 2022; 2023; 2025

Honduras competed at the 2009 World Championships in Athletics in Berlin, Germany, which were held from 15 to 23 August 2009. The athlete delegation consisted of two competitors, sprinter Rolando Palacios and Jeimy Bernárdez. Bernárdez competed in the women's 100 metres hurdles though failed to advance past the heats. For Palacios, he reached the quarterfinals of the men's 100 metres and semifinals of the men's 200 metres.

== Background ==
The 2009 World Championships in Athletics were held at the Olympiastadion in Berlin, Germany. Under the auspices of the International Amateur Athletic Federation, this was the twelfth edition of the World Championships. It was held from 15 to 23 August 2009 and had 47 different events. Among the competing nations was Honduras. For this edition of the World Championships in Athletics, sprinter Rolando Palacios and Jeimy Bernárdez competed for the nation.

== Results ==
=== Men ===
Palacios first competed in the qualifying heats of the men's 100 metres on 15 August in the eighth heat against seven other competitors. There, he recorded a time of 10.28 seconds for a new season's best and placed fifth, advancing further as his time was fast enough to progress despite being outside of the top three. He then competed in the quarterfinals held the same day in the fifth heat against seven other competitors. There, he recorded a time of 10.24 seconds for another season's best and placed sixth, failing to advance further into competition.

He then competed in the qualifying heats of the men's 200 metres on 18 August in the seventh heat against six other competitors. There, he recorded a time of 20.83 seconds and placed third, advancing further as he was in the top three of his heat. He then competed in the quarterfinals in the same day, competing in the second heat against seven other competitors. There, he recorded a time of 20.69 seconds for a new season's best and again placed third, advancing to the semifinals. In the second semifinal against seven other competitors, he recorded a time of 20.67 seconds for another season's best but placed seventh, failing to advance to the finals.

Event	Athletes	Heats		Quarterfinals		Semifinal		Final	
Event	Athletes	Result	Rank	Result	Rank	Result	Rank	Result	Rank
100 m	Rolando Palacios	10.28 SB	5	10.24 SB	6	did not advance			
200 m	Rolando Palacios	20.83	3	20.69 SB	3	20.67 SB	7	did not advance	

=== Women ===
Bernárdez competed in the qualifying heats of the women's 100 metres hurdles on 18 August in the first heat against six other athletes. There, she recorded a time of 14.53 seconds and placed last, failing to advance further to the semifinals.

Event	Athletes	Heats		Semifinal		Final	
Event	Athletes	Result	Rank	Result	Rank	Result	Rank
100 m hurdles	Jeimy Bernárdez	14.53	7	did not advance			
