= Vietnam at the 2023 World Athletics Championships =

- Flag of Vietnam
- WA code: VIE

in Budapest, Hungary 19 August 2023 – 27 August 2023
- Competitors: 1 (0 men and 1 woman)
- Medals: Gold 0 Silver 0 Bronze 0 Total 0

World Athletics Championships appearances (overview)
- 1983; 1987; 1991; 1993; 1995; 1997; 1999; 2001; 2003; 2005–2007; 2009; 2011; 2013; 2015; 2017; 2019; 2022; 2023

Vietnam competed at the 2023 World Athletics Championships in Budapest, Hungary, which were held from 19 to 27 August 2023. The athlete delegation of the country was composed of one competitor, middle-distance runner Nguyễn Thị Oanh who would compete in the women's 1500 metres. She qualified upon being selected by the Vietnam Athletics Federation. In the heats, she placed twelfth out of the thirteen competitors that participated, also setting a new personal best in the event. She did not advance to the semifinals of the event.

== Background ==
The 2023 World Athletics Championships in Budapest, Hungary, were held from 19 to 27 August 2023. The Championships were held at the National Athletics Centre. To qualify for the World Championships, athletes had to reach an entry standard (e.g. time or distance), place in a specific position at select competitions, be a wild card entry, or qualify through their World Athletics Ranking at the end of the qualification period.

As Vietnam did not meet any of the four standards, they could send either one male or one female athlete in one event of the Championships who has not yet qualified. The Vietnam Athletics Federation selected middle-distance runner Nguyễn Thị Oanh who held a personal best of 4:13.88 at the time of her selection for the Championships.

== Results ==
Key

- Q = Qualified for the next round
- q = Qualified for the next round as a fastest loser or, in field events, by position without achieving the qualifying target
- NR = National record
- PB = Personal best
- SB = Season best
- N/A = Round not applicable for the event

=== Women ===
Nguyễn competed in the heats of the women's 1500 metres on 19 August against thirteen other competitors in her round. She raced in the third heat and recorded a time of 4:12.28 for a new personal best in the event. There, she placed twelfth and did not advance further to the semifinals of the event.

Track and road events

Athlete	Event	Heat		Semifinal		Final	
Athlete	Event	Result	Rank	Result	Rank	Result	Rank
Nguyễn Thị Oanh	1500 metres	4:12.28 PB	13	Did not advance			
