= Tashi Dendup =

Bhutanese sprinter

Personal information
- Born: 22 February 1998 (age 28)
- Education: Yangchenphug Higher Secondary School

Sport
- Country: Bhutan
- Sport: Track and field
- Event: sprinter
- Updated on 29 August 2015

Tashi Dendup (born 22 February 1998) is a male Bhutanese sprinter. He competed in the 100 metres event at the 2015 World Championships in Athletics in Beijing, China.

His mark at the World Championships made him the Bhutanese record holder in the 100 metres, and though that mark was since broken he still holds the record in the long jump with a mark of 6.74 m. At the championships, Dendup was noted for having a first name that sounded like "Stache". He improved his personal best and the old national record by half a second. Despite this, after the race, Dendup told the Gulf Times, "The time was not so good."

== See also ==
- Bhutan at the 2015 World Championships in Athletics
