= Asian Athletics =

Continental athletics authority in Asia

- Abbreviation: AA
- Formation: November 1973; 52 years ago
- Type: Sports organisation
- Headquarters: Pathum Thani, Thailand
- Region served: Asia
- Members: 45 national associations
- President: Dahlan Jumaan al-Hamad
- Main organ: Asian Athletics Council
- Parent organization: World Athletics
- Website: https://www.asianathletics.com

The Asian Athletics (AA), formerly known as Asian Athletics Association (AAA) and Asian Amateur Athletics Association (from 1973 to 2002), is the continental governing body for the sport of athletics in Asia. It is headquartered in Thailand. It organises the Asian Championships in Athletics and other continental competitions.

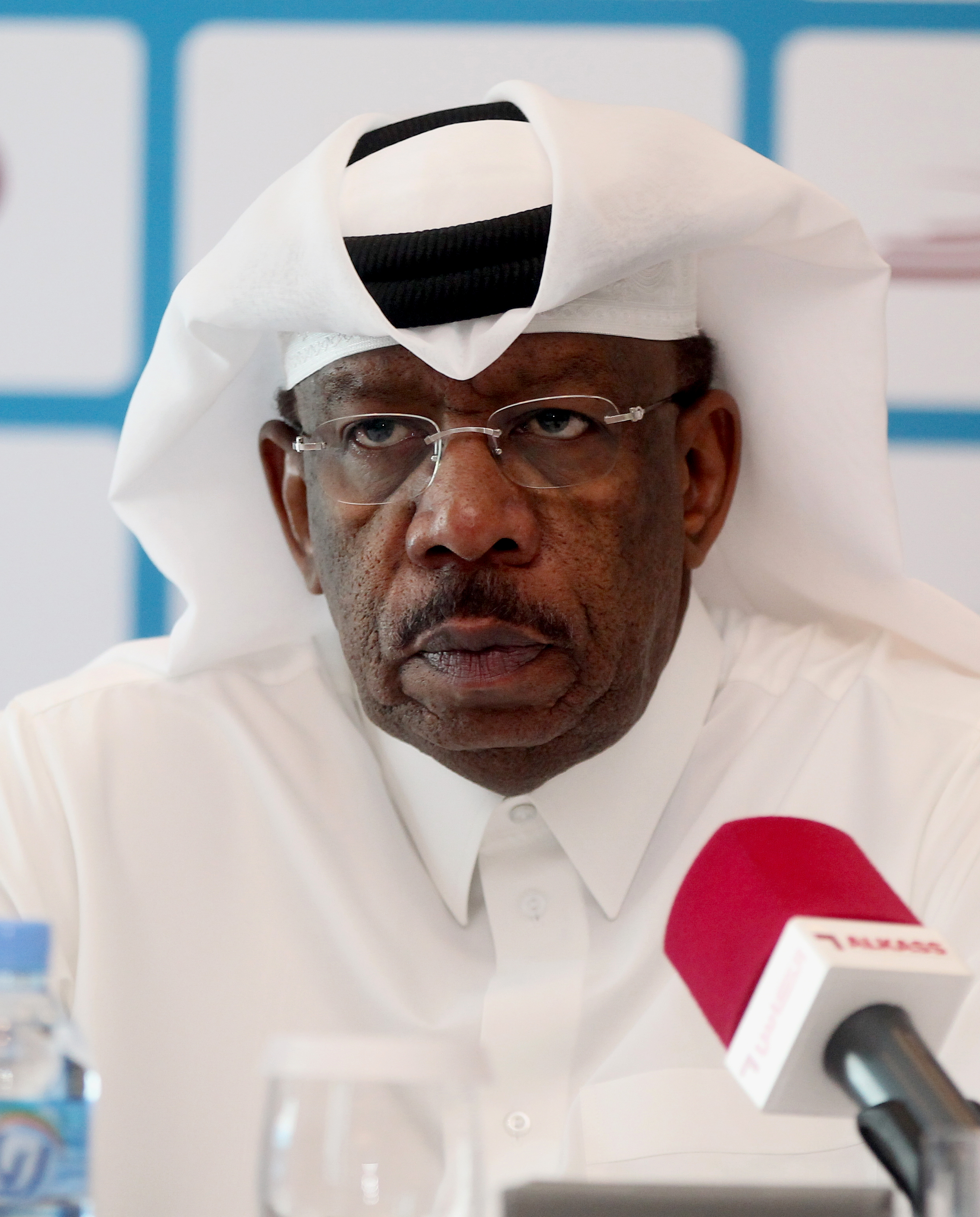
Dahlan Al Hamad during a Press conference in Doha.

The current president Qatari Dahlan Jumaan al-Hamad, who was elected to the position in 2013. Suresh Kalmadi of India was the president from 2000 to 2013.

== Competitions ==
- Asian Athletics Championships
- Asian U20 Athletics Championships
- Asian U18 Athletics Championships
- Asian Indoor Athletics Championships
- Asian Cross Country Championships
- Asian Athletics Grand Prix Series
- Asian Marathon Championships
- Asian Race Walking Championships
- Asian All Star Athletics Meet
- Asian Relay Championship
- Asian Throwing Championship

== Member associations ==
Nation	Association
Afghanistan	Afghanistan Athletic Federation
Bahrain	Bahrain Athletics Association
Bangladesh	Bangladesh Athletic Federation
Bhutan	Bhutan Amateur Athletic Federation
Brunei	Brunei Darussalam Athletics Federation
Cambodia	Khmer Amateur Athletics Federation
China	Chinese Athletics Association
Chinese Taipei	Chinese Taipei Athletics Association
Hong Kong	Hong Kong, China Association of Athletics Affiliates
India	Athletics Federation of India
Indonesia	Indonesian Athletics Association
Iran	Athletics Federation of I.R. Iran
Iraq	Iraqi Athletics Federation
Japan	Japan Association of Athletics Federations
Jordan	Jordan Athletics Federation
Kazakhstan	Athletic Federation of the Republic of Kazakhstan
Kuwait	Kuwait Athletics Federation
Kyrgyzstan	Athletics Federation of Kyrgyz Republic
Laos	Laos Amateur Athletic Federation
Lebanon	Fédération libanaise d'athlétisme
Macau	Associação de Atletismo de Macau
Malaysia	Malaysia Athletics Federation
Maldives	Athletics Association of Maldives
Mongolia	Mongolian Athletic Federation
Myanmar	Myanmar Track and Field Federation
Nepal	Nepal Athletics Association
North Korea	Amateur Athletics Association of DPR of Korea
Oman	Oman Athletic Association
Pakistan	Athletics Federation of Pakistan
Palestine	Palestine Athletic Federation
Philippines	Philippine Athletics Track and Field Association
Qatar	Qatar Athletics Federation
Saudi Arabia	Saudi Arabian Athletics Federation
Singapore	Singapore Athletic Association
South Korea	Korea Association of Athletics Federations
Sri Lanka	Sri Lanka Athletics
Syria	Syrian Arab Athletic Federation
Tajikistan	Athletics Federation of the Republic of Tajikistan
Thailand	Athletic Association of Thailand
Timor-Leste	Federação Timor-Leste de Atletismo
Turkmenistan	Amateur Athletic Federation of Turkmenistan
United Arab Emirates	United Arab Emirates Athletics Federation
Uzbekistan	Athletic Federation of Uzbekistan
Vietnam	Vietnam Athletics Federation
Yemen	Yemen Athletics Federation
