= 2019 World Athletics Championships – Men's 100 metres =

Men's 100 metres at the 2019 World Championships
- Venue: Khalifa International Stadium
- Dates: 27 September (preliminary round & heats); 28 September (semi-final & final)
- Competitors: 67 from 48 nations
- Winning time: 9.76

Medalists
gold medal	Christian Coleman	United States
silver medal	Justin Gatlin	United States
bronze medal	Andre De Grasse	Canada

Video on YouTube Official Video

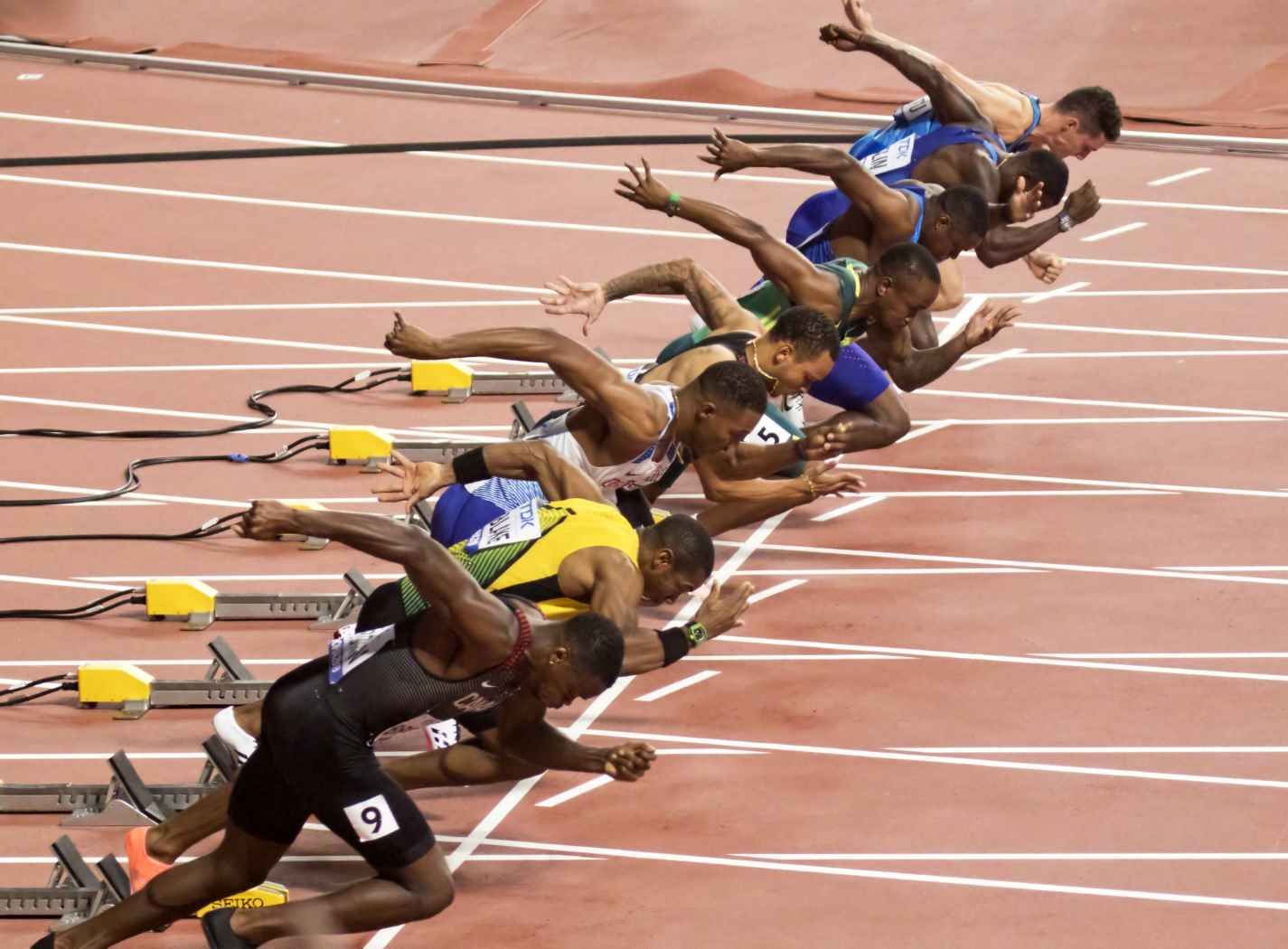
100m final men

The men's 100 metres at the 2019 World Athletics Championships was held at the Khalifa International Stadium in Doha on 27 to 28 September 2019.

== Summary ==
The semi-finals were dominated by world leader Christian Coleman, who was allowed to compete despite missing three doping tests in the year due to a technicality, and blasted a 9.88 while no other qualifiers broke 10. The last time qualifier, Filippo Tortu, made the final by .001, running 10.101 over Tyquendo Tracey's 10.102, while Aaron Brown got in by placing second behind Coleman in heat 1 with 10.12.

In the final, defending champion Justin Gatlin got a good start to gain a step on the field, except Coleman got a better start, gaining that step on Gatlin. Unlike 2017, Coleman did not give ground back, extending his lead to a dominating victory in 9.76. A new personal best, world leading time for the season, that becomes the #6 time in history, just 0.02 seconds behind Gatlin's personal best. Returning to form, Andre De Grasse closed and nearly caught Gatlin at the line in 9.90, a new wind legal personal best.

At 37 years old, the world M35 record holder over 100m Justin Gatlin became the oldest athlete to ever medal in 100m in the World Championships history.

== Records ==
Before the competition records were as follows:

Record	Athlete & Nat.	Perf.	Location	Date
World record	Usain Bolt (JAM)	9.58	Berlin, Germany	16 August 2009
Championship record	Usain Bolt (JAM)	9.58	Berlin, Germany	16 August 2009
World Leading	Christian Coleman (USA)	9.81	Palo Alto, United States	30 June 2019
African Record	Olusoji Fasuba (NGR)	9.85	Doha, Qatar	12 May 2006
Asian Record	Femi Ogunode (QAT)	9.91	Wuhan, China	4 June 2015
Asian Record	Femi Ogunode (QAT)	9.91	Gainesville, United States	22 April 2016
Asian Record	Su Bingtian (CHN)	9.91	Madrid, Spain	22 June 2018
Asian Record	Su Bingtian (CHN)	9.91	Paris, France	30 June 2018
North, Central American and Caribbean record	Usain Bolt (JAM)	9.58	Berlin, Germany	16 August 2009
South American Record	Robson da Silva (BRA)	10.00A	Mexico City, Mexico	22 July 1988
European Record	Francis Obikwelu (POR)	9.86	Athens, Greece	22 August 2004
European Record	Jimmy Vicaut (FRA)	9.86	Saint-Denis, France	4 July 2015
European Record	Jimmy Vicaut (FRA)	9.86	Montreuil-sous-Bois, France	7 June 2016
Oceanian record	Patrick Johnson (AUS)	9.93	Mito, Japan	5 May 2003

The following records were set at the competition:

Record	Perf.	Athlete	Nat.	Date
Malawian	10.72	Stern Noel Liffa	MAW	27 Sep 2019
Bhutanese	11.64	Dinesh Kumar Dhakal	BHU	27 Sep 2019
World Leading	9.76	Christian Coleman	USA	28 Sep 2019

== Qualification standard ==
The standard to qualify automatically for entry was 10.10.

== Schedule ==
The event schedule, in local time (UTC+3), was as follows:

Date	Time	Round
27 September	16:35	Preliminary round
27 September	18:05	Heats
28 September	18:45	Semi-finals
28 September	22:15	Final

== Results ==
=== Preliminary round ===
The first athlete in each heat ( Q ) and the next five fastest ( q ) qualified for the first round proper. The overall results were as follows:
Wind: P1:+0.1, P2:+0.4, P3:+0.3, P4:+0.0

Rank	Heat	Name	Nationality	Time	Notes
1	1	Taymir Burnet	Netherlands	10.23	Q
2	2	Kim Kuk-young	South Korea	10.32	Q
3	3	Xu Zhouzheng	China	10.35	Q
4	4	Ebrima Camara	Gambia	10.36	Q
5	1	Hakeem Huggins	Saint Kitts and Nevis	10.49	q
6	4	Banuve Tabakaucoro	Fiji	10.56	q
7	3	Jonathan Bardottier	Mauritius	10.61	q
8	1	Owaab Barrow	Qatar	10.64	q, PB
9	2	Ngan Ngoc Nghia	Vietnam	10.67	q, SB
10	2	Yendountien Tiebekabe	Togo	10.69	
11	4	Stern Noel Liffa	Malawi	10.72	NR
12	3	Melique García	Honduras	10.76	
13	2	Brandon Jones	Belize	10.88	
14	3	Rossene Mpingo	DR Congo	10.98	PB
15	4	Jonah Harris	Nauru	11.01	
16	1	Ronald Fotofili	Tonga	11.06	
17	1	Saymon Rijo Morris	Anguilla	11.11	PB
18	2	Paul Ma'Unikeni	Solomon Islands	11.29	SB
19	3	Scott Fiti	Federated States of Micronesia	11.34	
20	4	Cheick Camara	Guinea	11.38	PB
21	1	Said Gilani	Afghanistan	11.45	SB
22	3	Bleu Perez	Guam	11.48	SB
23	2	Tirioro Willie	Kiribati	11.57	
24	4	Dinesh Kumar Dhakal	Bhutan	11.64	NR
25	4	Nainoa Soto Thompson	American Samoa	11.66	
26	4	Adrian Ililau	Palau	11.67	
27	1	Tikove Piira	Cook Islands	11.81	
28	3	Don Motellang	Marshall Islands	11.89	PB
29	1	Alpha Diagana	Mauritania	12.30	PB
	2	Ahmed Ali	Sudan (SUD)	DNS	

=== Heats ===
The first 3 in each heat ( Q ) and the next six fastest ( q ) qualified for the semifinals. The overall results were as follows:
Wind: H1:-0.3, H2:-0.8, H3:-0.8, H4:-0.3, H5:-0.3, H6:+0.1

Rank	Heat	Name	Nationality	Time	Notes
1	6	Christian Coleman	United States	9.98	Q
2	1	Akani Simbine	South Africa	10.01	Q
3	2	Justin Gatlin	United States	10.06	Q
4	4	Yohan Blake	Jamaica	10.07	Q
5	6	Marcell Jacobs	Italy	10.07	Q
6	4	Jimmy Vicaut	France	10.08	Q
7	3	Zharnel Hughes	Great Britain & N.I.	10.08	Q
8	6	Abdul Hakim Sani Brown	Japan	10.09	Q
9	5	Paulo André de Oliveira	Brazil	10.11	Q
10	2	Andre De Grasse	Canada	10.13	Q
11	3	Raymond Ekevwo	Nigeria	10.14	Q
12	5	Mike Rodgers	United States	10.14	Q
13	4	Arthur Cissé	Ivory Coast	10.14	Q
14	1	Aaron Brown	Canada	10.16	Q
15	4	Yoshihide Kiryū	Japan	10.18	q
16	3	Emmanuel Matadi	Liberia	10.19	Q
16	1	Xie Zhenye	China	10.19	Q
18	2	Adam Gemili	Great Britain & N.I.	10.19	Q
19	5	Filippo Tortu	Italy	10.20	Q
20	1	Taymir Burnet	Netherlands	10.21	q
20	5	Yuki Koike	Japan	10.21	q
22	4	Su Bingtian	China	10.21	q
23	2	Tyquendo Tracey	Jamaica	10.21	q
24	1	Ojie Edoburun	Great Britain & N.I.	10.23	q
25	1	Christopher Belcher	United States	10.23	
26	2	Edward Osei-Nketia	New Zealand	10.24	
27	5	Hassan Taftian	Iran	10.24	
28	3	Simon Magakwe	South Africa	10.25	
29	5	Thando Dlodlo	South Africa	10.25	
30	6	Rodrigo do Nascimento	Brazil	10.25	
31	6	Mario Burke	Barbados	10.31	
32	4	Kim Kuk-young	South Korea	10.32	
33	3	Cejhae Greene	Antigua and Barbuda	10.33	
34	3	Joseph Amoah	Ghana	10.36	
35	6	Lalu Muhammad Zohri	Indonesia	10.36	
36	3	Xu Zhouzheng	China	10.37	
37	1	Kemar Hyman	Cayman Islands	10.37	
38	6	Alex Wilson	Switzerland	10.38	
39	3	Ebrima Camara	Gambia	10.38	
40	2	Rohan Browning	Australia	10.40	
41	4	Vitor Hugo dos Santos	Brazil	10.42	
42	2	Usheoritse Itsekiri	Nigeria	10.46	
43	1	Banuve Tabakaucoro	Fiji	10.56	
44	4	Hakeem Huggins	Saint Kitts and Nevis	10.62	
45	5	Owaab Barrow	Qatar	12.82	
	5	Divine Oduduru	Nigeria	DNS	
	2	Jonathan Bardottier	Mauritius	DNS	
	6	Ngần Ngọc Nghĩa	Vietnam	DNS	

=== Semi-finals ===
Video on YouTube Official Video

The first 2 in each heat ( Q ) and the next two fastest ( q ) qualified for the final.
Wind: S1:-0.3, S2:-0.3, S3:+0.8

Rank	Heat	Name	Nationality	Time	Notes
1	1	Christian Coleman	United States	9.88	Q
2	3	Akani Simbine	South Africa	10.01	Q
3	3	Zharnel Hughes	Great Britain & N.I.	10.05	Q
4	2	Andre De Grasse	Canada	10.07	Q
5	2	Yohan Blake	Jamaica	10.09	Q
6	2	Justin Gatlin	United States	10.09	q
7	3	Filippo Tortu	Italy	10.11	q
8	3	Tyquendo Tracey	Jamaica	10.11	
9	3	Mike Rodgers	United States	10.12	
10	1	Aaron Brown	Canada	10.12	Q
11	1	Adam Gemili	Great Britain & N.I.	10.13	
12	1	Paulo André de Oliveira	Brazil	10.14	
13	2	Xie Zhenye	China	10.14	
14	1	Abdul Hakim Sani Brown	Japan	10.15	
15	3	Yoshihide Kiryū	Japan	10.16	
16	3	Jimmy Vicaut	France	10.16	
17	1	Taymir Burnet	Netherlands	10.18	
18	2	Raymond Ekevwo	Nigeria	10.20	
19	1	Marcell Jacobs	Italy	10.20	
20	2	Ojie Edoburun	Great Britain & N.I.	10.22	
21	1	Su Bingtian	China	10.23	
22	2	Yuki Koike	Japan	10.28	
23	2	Emmanuel Matadi	Liberia	10.28	
24	3	Arthur Cissé	Ivory Coast	10.34	

=== Final ===
The final was started on 28 September at 22:15.
Wind: +0.6

Rank	Lane	Name	Nationality	Time	Notes
1st place, gold medalist(s)	4	Christian Coleman	United States	9.76	WL
2nd place, silver medalist(s)	3	Justin Gatlin	United States	9.89	
3rd place, bronze medalist(s)	6	Andre De Grasse	Canada	9.90	PB
4	5	Akani Simbine	South Africa	9.93	SB
5	8	Yohan Blake	Jamaica	9.97	
6	7	Zharnel Hughes	Great Britain & N.I.	10.03	
7	2	Filippo Tortu	Italy	10.07	SB
8	9	Aaron Brown	Canada	10.08	
