= Honduras at the 2013 World Championships in Athletics =

- WA code: HON

in Moscow
- Competitors: 1
- Medals: Gold 0 Silver 0 Bronze 0 Total 0

World Championships in Athletics appearances
- 1983; 1987; 1991; 1993; 1995; 1997; 1999; 2001; 2003; 2005; 2007; 2009; 2011; 2013; 2015; 2017; 2019; 2022; 2023; 2025

Honduras competed at the 2013 World Championships in Athletics in Moscow, Russia, which were held from 10 to 18 August 2013. The athlete delegation consisted of one sole competitor, sprinter Rolando Palacios, who was competing in his fourth appearance for the nation at the World Championships. There, he competed in the men's 200 metres. He placed sixth in his heat and set a season's best but did not advance further to the semifinals.

== Background ==
The 2013 World Championships in Athletics were held at Luzhniki Stadium in Moscow, Russia. Under the auspices of the International Amateur Athletic Federation, this was the fourteenth edition of the World Championships. It was held from 10 to 18 August and had 47 different events. Among the competing nations was Honduras. For this edition of the World Championships in Athletics, sprinter Rolando Palacios was the sole representative of the nation. This was Palacios' fourth appearance for Honduras at the World Championships, competing first in 2005.

== Result ==
Palacios competed in the qualifying heats of the men's 200 metres on 16 August 2013 in the fifth heat against seven other competitors, namely: James Ellington, Jason Livermore, Luguelín Santos, Wallace Spearmon, Courtney Carl Williams, Xie Zhenye, and Karol Zalewski. There, Palacios recorded a time of 21.02 seconds and placed sixth, failing to advance to the semifinals as only the top three of each heat and next three fastest sprinters would only be able to do so. Although he did not advance further, he set a season's best with his run.

Athletics summary
Athlete	Event	Heat		Semifinal		Final	
Athlete	Event	Result	Rank	Result	Rank	Result	Rank
Rolando Palacios	200 m	21.02 SB	6	Did not advance			
