= Paraguay at the 2017 World Championships in Athletics =

- Flag of Paraguay
- WA code: PAR
- National federation: Paraguayan Athletics Federation
- Website: fpa.org.py (in Spanish)

in London, United Kingdom 4–13 August 2017
- Competitors: 2 (1 man and 1 woman) in 2 events
- Medals: Gold 0 Silver 0 Bronze 0 Total 0

World Championships in Athletics appearances
- 1983; 1987; 1991; 1993; 1995; 1997; 1999; 2001; 2003; 2005; 2007; 2009; 2011; 2013; 2015; 2017; 2019; 2022; 2023; 2025

Paraguay competed at the 2017 World Championships in Athletics in London, United Kingdom, from 4–13 August 2017.

== Results ==
=== Men ===
Track and road events

Athlete	Event	Final	
Athlete	Event	Result	Rank
Derlys Ayala	Marathon	2:16.37 SB	25

=== Women ===
Track and road events

Athlete	Event	Final	
Athlete	Event	Result	Rank
Carmen Martínez	10,000 metres	33:18.22 NR	31
