= Bhutan at the 2013 World Championships in Athletics =

- WA code: BHU

in Moscow
- Competitors: 1
- Medals: Gold 0 Silver 0 Bronze 0 Total 0

World Championships in Athletics appearances
- 1999; 2001–2007; 2009; 2011; 2013; 2015; 2017; 2019; 2022; 2023–2025

Bhutan competed at the 2013 World Championships in Athletics from August 10 to August 18 in Moscow, Russia. One athlete was announced to represent the country at the championship, participating in the 1500 metres event.

== Results ==
(q – qualified, NM – no mark, SB – season best)

=== Men ===
Athlete	Event	Heats		Semifinals		Final	
Athlete	Event	Time	Rank	Time	Rank	Time	Rank
Thinley Tenzin	1500 metres	4:24.54 PB	37	did not advance			
