= Bleu Perez =

Guamanian sprinter

Bleu Michael Perez (born 29 September 1996 in Guam) is a sprinter from Guam.

In 2019, he competed in the men's 100 metres event at the 2019 World Athletics Championships in Doha, Qatar. He competed in the preliminary round and he did not advance to compete in the heats.
