= Paraguay at the 2022 World Athletics Championships =

- WA code: PAR
- National federation: FPA
- Website: fpa.org.py

in Eugene, United States 15–24 July 2022
- Competitors: 1 (1 man and 0 women)
- Medals: Gold 0 Silver 0 Bronze 0 Total 0

World Athletics Championships appearances
- 1983; 1987; 1991; 1993; 1995; 1997; 1999; 2001; 2003; 2005; 2007; 2009; 2011; 2013; 2015; 2017; 2019; 2022; 2023; 2025

Paraguay competed at the 2022 World Athletics Championships in Eugene, Oregon, United States, which were held from 15 to 24 July 2022. The athlete delegation of the country was composed of one competitor, sprinter Cesar Almiron who competed in the men's 100 metres. There, he placed first in his preliminary round and advanced up until the qualifying heats.

== Background ==
The 2022 World Athletics Championships in Eugene, Oregon, United States, were held from 15 to 24 July 2022. To qualify for the World Championships, athletes had to reach an entry standard (e.g. time and distance), place in a specific position at select competitions, be a wild card entry, or qualify through their World Athletics Ranking at the end of the qualification period.

As Paraguay did not meet any of the four standards, they could send either one male or one female athlete in one event of the Championships who has not yet qualified. The Paraguayan Athletics Federation selected sprinter Cesar Almiron who held a personal best of 10.38 seconds and a season's best of 10.43 seconds in the men's 100 metres, his entered event. At the time of the World Championships, he ranked 517 in the World Athletics Rankings.

== Results ==
=== Men ===
Almiron competed in the preliminaries of the men's 100 metres on 15 July in the first heat against six other competitors. There, he recorded a time of 10.49 seconds and placed first, advancing further to the qualifying heats. He then competed in the fifth qualifying heat held on the same day against seven other competitors. There, he recorded a time of 10.51 seconds and placed seventh, failing to advance further as only the top three of each heat and the next three fastest athletes would only be able to do so.

Key

- Q = Qualified for the next round
- q = Qualified for the next round as a fastest loser or, in field events, by position without achieving the qualifying target
- NR = National record
- PB = Personal best
- SB = Season best

Track and road events

Athlete	Event	Prelims		Heat		Semi-final		Final	
Athlete	Event	Results	Rank	Result	Rank	Result	Rank	Result	Rank
Cesar Almiron	100 metres	10.49 (+0.5)	6 Q	10.51 (+1.1)	46	did not advance			
