= 2022 World Athletics Championships – Men's 100 metres =

Men's 100 metres at the 2022 World Championships
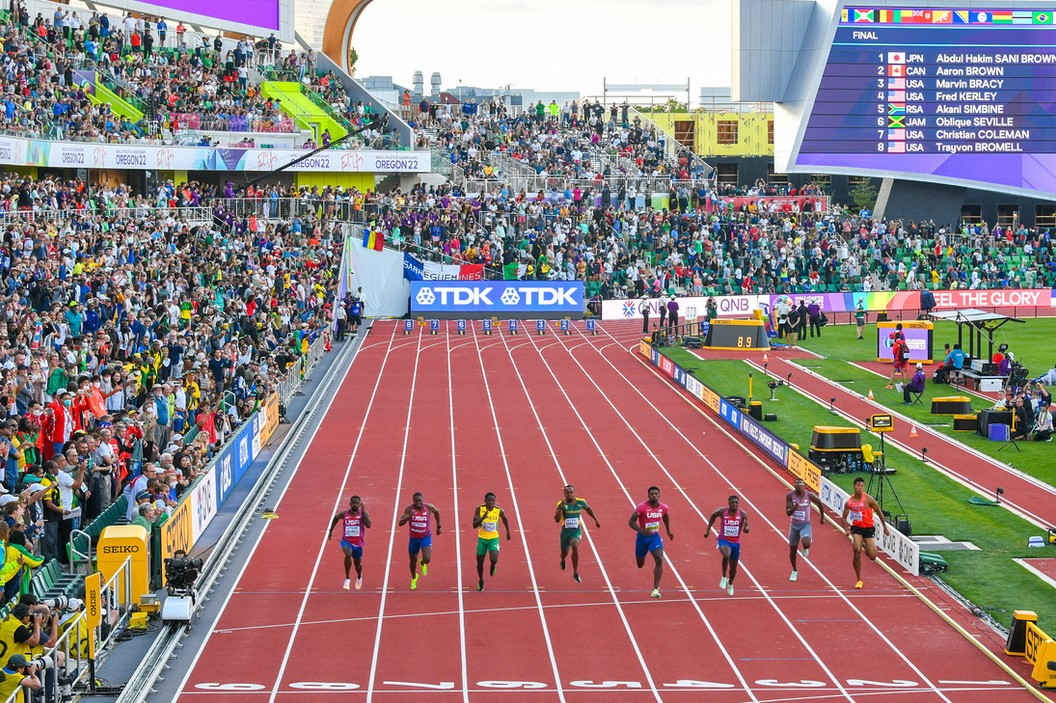
- Final of the event
- Venue: Hayward Field
- Dates: 15 July (preliminary round & heats); 16 July (semi-final & final)
- Competitors: 76 from 53 nations
- Winning time: 9.86

Medalists
gold medal	Fred Kerley	United States
silver medal	Marvin Bracy	United States
bronze medal	Trayvon Bromell	United States

Video on YouTube Official Video

The men's 100 metres at the 2022 World Athletics Championships was held at the Hayward Field in Eugene on 15 and 16 July 2022. 76 athletes from 53 nations entered to the competition.

== Summary ==
The defending champion Christian Coleman got his customary fast start, with Marvin Bracy, Abdul Hakim Sani Brown and Aaron Brown all out fast on the opposite side of the track. By 40 metres Bracy and Coleman were clear leaders with Fred Kerley just an arm's length back. Over the next 20 metres, Bracy separated to a full metre over Kerley as Coleman was straining. Next to last out of the blocks, Trayvon Bromell came back to pass Coleman with 30 metres to go as all four American sprinters occupied the top places with Bromell about even with Kerley and Bracy clearly ahead. In the three steps from 20 to 10 metres before the finish, Kerley made up the gap on Bracy and in the final 10 metres edged ahead. Bracy began to lean early straining for the finish, almost being caught by Bromell for silver, the medal decided by 2 thousandths of a second.

In the premiere event of the games, USA achieved a sweep at home. Meanwhile, defending 2021 Olympic gold medalist, Marcell Jacobs of Italy, ran a 10.02 in his opening heat and withdrew from the semi-finals, citing a thigh injury.

== Records ==
Before the competition records were as follows:

Record	Athlete & Nat.	Perf.	Location	Date
World record	Usain Bolt (JAM)	9.58	Berlin, Germany	16 August 2009
Championship record	Usain Bolt (JAM)	9.58	Berlin, Germany	16 August 2009
World Leading	Fred Kerley (USA)	9.76	Eugene, United States	24 June 2022
African Record	Ferdinand Omanyala (KEN)	9.77	Nairobi, Kenya	18 September 2021
Asian Record	Su Bingtian (CHN)	9.83	Tokyo, Japan	1 August 2021
North, Central American and Caribbean record	Usain Bolt (JAM)	9.58	Berlin, Germany	16 August 2009
South American Record	Robson da Silva (BRA)	10.00A	Mexico City, Mexico	22 July 1988
European Record	Marcell Jacobs (ITA)	9.80	Tokyo, Japan	1 August 2021
Oceanian record	Patrick Johnson (AUS)	9.93	Mito, Japan	5 May 2003

== Qualification standard ==
The standard to qualify automatically for entry was 10.05.

== Schedule ==
The event schedule, in local time (UTC−7), was as follows:

Date	Time	Round
15 July	12:30	Preliminary round
15 July	18:50	Heats
16 July	18:00	Semi-finals
16 July	19:50	Final

== Results ==
=== Preliminary round ===
The preliminary round took place on 15 July, with the 28 athletes involved being split into 4 heats of 7 athletes each. The first 2 athletes in each heat ( Q ) and the next 6 fastest ( q ) qualified for the round 1. The overall results were as follows:

Wind:
Heat 1: +0.5 m/s, Heat 2: -0.1 m/s, Heat 3: 0.0 m/s, Heat 4: +1.1 m/s

Rank	Heat	Name	Nationality	Time	Notes
1	4	Emanuel Archibald	Guyana	10.31	Q
2	2	Ebrahima Camara	Gambia	10.37	Q
3	2	Lalu Muhammad Zohri	Indonesia	10.46	Q, SB
4	2	Imranur Rahman	Bangladesh	10.47	q
5	4	Dorian Keletela	Athlete Refugee Team	10.48	Q
6	1	César Almirón	Paraguay	10.49	Q
7	3	Lionel Tshimanga Muteba	DR Congo	10.64	Q
8	3	Hussein Ali Al Khafaji	Iraq	10.65	Q
9	1	Ildar Akhmadiev	Tajikistan	10.66	Q
10	3	Francesco Sansovini	San Marino	10.67	q
11	1	Noureddine Hadid	Lebanon	10.68	q, SB
12	4	Melique García	Honduras	10.70	q, SB
13	1	Shaun Gill	Belize	10.76	q
14	1	Hassan Saaid	Maldives	10.77	q, SB
15	3	Craig Gill	Gibraltar	11.24 [.232]	SB
16	4	Omar Aburouss	Jordan	11.24 [.233]	SB
17	3	Lataisi Mwea	Kiribati	11.43 [.424]	
17	4	Said Gilani	Afghanistan	11.43 [.424]	SB
19	2	Karalo Maibuca	Tuvalu	11.46	SB
20	4	Tikove Piira	Cook Islands	11.56	SB
21	1	Scott Fiti	Federated States of Micronesia	11.61	SB
22	2	Ignacio Blaluk	Palau	11.66	PB
23	3	Nathan Crumpton	American Samoa	11.71	SB
24	1	Mipham Yoezer Gurung	Bhutan	11.86	PB
25	2	Nehumi Tuihalamaka	Tonga	12.22	PB
	4	Banuve Tabakaucoro	Fiji		DQ
	2	Ahmed Amaar	Libya (LBA)		DNS
	3	Boubacar Barry	Guinea (GUI)		DNS

=== Round 1 (heats) ===
Round 1 took place on 15 July, with the 57 athletes involved being split into 7 heats, 6 heats of 8 and 1 of 9 athletes. The first 3 athletes in each heat ( Q ) and the next 3 fastest ( q ) qualified for the semi-final. The overall results were as follows:

Wind:
Heat 1: -0.1 m/s, Heat 2: +0.1 m/s, Heat 3: +0.6 m/s, Heat 4: +0.2 m/s, Heat 5: +1.1 m/s, Heat 6: +0.5 m/s, Heat 7: -0.3 m/s

Rank	Heat	Name	Nationality	Time	Notes
1	2	Fred Kerley	United States	9.79	Q
2	3	Trayvon Bromell	United States	9.89	Q
3	4	Oblique Seville	Jamaica	9.93	Q
4	5	Letsile Tebogo	Botswana	9.94	Q, WU20R, NR
5	2	Zharnel Hughes	Great Britain & N.I.	9.97	Q, =SB
6	7	Abdul Hakim Sani Brown	Japan	9.98	Q, SB
7	2	Emmanuel Matadi	Liberia	9.99	Q
8	2	Favour Ashe	Nigeria	10.00	q
9	3	Arthur Cissé	Ivory Coast	10.02	Q, SB
10	4	Marcell Jacobs	Italy	10.04 [.032]	Q, =SB
11	5	Yohan Blake	Jamaica	10.04 [.035]	Q
12	1	Marvin Bracy	United States	10.05	Q
13	5	Aaron Brown	Canada	10.06	Q, SB
14	5	Akani Simbine	South Africa	10.07	q
15	6	Christian Coleman	United States	10.08 [.071]	Q
16	7	Edward Osei-Nketia	New Zealand	10.08 [.078]	Q, NR
17	7	Ferdinand Omanyala	Kenya	10.10	Q
18	3	Rodrigo do Nascimento	Brazil	10.11	Q
19	6	Andre de Grasse	Canada	10.12 [.111]	Q
20	4	Ryuichiro Sakai	Japan	10.12 [.114]	Q
21	2	Su Bingtian	China	10.15 [.142]	q, =SB
22	1	Ackeem Blake	Jamaica	10.15 [.144]	Q
23	4	Reece Prescod	Great Britain & N.I.	10.15 [.145]	
24	3	Jerome Blake	Canada	10.16	
25	7	Ismaël Koné	Ivory Coast	10.17 [.161]	
26	1	Raymond Ekevwo	Nigeria	10.17 [.162]	Q
27	1	Cejhae Greene	Antigua and Barbuda	10.17 [.164]	
28	6	Erik Cardoso	Brazil	10.18 [.173]	Q
29	6	Benjamin Azamati	Ghana	10.18 [.180]	
30	6	Gift Leotlela	South Africa	10.19 [.187]	
30	3	Yupun Abeykoon	Sri Lanka	10.19 [.187]	
32	4	Julian Wagner	Germany	10.21 [.201]	
33	4	Shainer Rengifo Montoya	Cuba	10.21 [.204]	
34	2	Jerod Elcock	Trinidad and Tobago	10.22 [.215]	
35	7	Felipe Bardi	Brazil	10.22 [.218]	
35	1	Rohan Browning	Australia	10.22 [.218]	
37	7	Joseph Paul Amoah	Ghana	10.22 [.220]	
38	5	Samson Colebrooke	Bahamas	10.23	
39	2	Emanuel Archibald	Guyana	10.24	
40	6	Udodi Chudi Onwuzurike	Nigeria	10.26	
41	5	Jake Doran	Australia	10.29	
42	1	Chituru Ali	Italy	10.40	
43	1	Lalu Muhammad Zohri	Indonesia	10.42	SB
44	7	Clarence Munyai	South Africa	10.47	
45	3	Ebrahima Camara	Gambia	10.48	
46	5	César Almirón	Paraguay	10.51	
47	4	Dorian Keletela	Athlete Refugee Team	10.52 [.513]	
48	3	Femi Ogunode	Qatar	10.52 [.515]	SB
49	6	Hussein Ali Al Khafaji	Iraq	10.55	
50	7	Lionel Tshimanga Muteba	DR Congo	10.60	
51	1	Francesco Sansovini	San Marino	10.71	
52	7	Noureddine Hadid	Lebanon	10.72	
53	3	Shaun Gill	Belize	10.77	
54	2	Hassan Saaid	Maldives	10.83	
55	6	Ildar Akhmadiev	Tajikistan	10.85	
56	5	Melique García	Honduras	10.88	
	4	Imranur Rahman	Bangladesh		DNS

=== Semi-final ===
The semi-final took place on 16 July, with the 24 athletes involved being split into 3 heats of 8 athletes each. The first 2 athletes in each heat ( Q ) and the next 2 fastest ( q ) qualified for the final. The overall results were as follows:

Wind:
Heat 1: +0.3 m/s, Heat 2: +0.1 m/s, Heat 3: -0.1 m/s

Rank	Heat	Name	Nationality	Time	Notes
1	3	Oblique Seville	Jamaica	9.90	Q
2	3	Marvin Bracy	United States	9.93	Q
3	1	Akani Simbine	South Africa	9.97 [.966]	Q, SB
4	1	Trayvon Bromell	United States	9.97 [.967]	Q
5	2	Fred Kerley	United States	10.02	Q
6	2	Christian Coleman	United States	10.05 [.042]	Q
7	1	Abdul Hakim Sani Brown	Japan	10.05 [.044]	q
8	3	Aaron Brown	Canada	10.06	q, SB
9	1	Yohan Blake	Jamaica	10.12 [.111]	
10	1	Emmanuel Matadi	Liberia	10.12 [.113]	
11	3	Favour Ashe	Nigeria	10.12 [.118]	
12	2	Zharnel Hughes	Great Britain & N.I.	10.13	
13	3	Ferdinand Omanyala	Kenya	10.14	
14	3	Erik Cardoso	Brazil	10.15	
15	1	Arthur Cissé	Ivory Coast	10.16	
16	3	Letsile Tebogo	Botswana	10.17	
17	1	Rodrigo do Nascimento	Brazil	10.19 [.185]	
18	2	Ackeem Blake	Jamaica	10.19 [.190]	
19	1	Raymond Ekevwo	Nigeria	10.20	
20	2	Andre de Grasse	Canada	10.21	
21	2	Ryuichiro Sakai	Japan	10.23	
22	2	Edward Osei-Nketia	New Zealand	10.29	
23	2	Su Bingtian	China	10.30	
	3	Marcell Jacobs	Italy	DNS	

=== Final ===
The final was started at 19:50 on 16 July. The results were as follows:

Wind: -0.1 m/s

Rank	Lane	Name	Nationality	Time	Notes
1st place, gold medalist(s)	4	Fred Kerley	United States	9.86	
2nd place, silver medalist(s)	3	Marvin Bracy	United States	9.88 [.874]	
3rd place, bronze medalist(s)	8	Trayvon Bromell	United States	9.88 [.876]	
4	6	Oblique Seville	Jamaica	9.97	
5	5	Akani Simbine	South Africa	10.01 [.003]	
6	7	Christian Coleman	United States	10.01 [.005]	
7	1	Abdul Hakim Sani Brown	Japan	10.06	
8	2	Aaron Brown	Canada	10.07	
