= Bob Hasan =

Indonesian businessman (1931–2020)

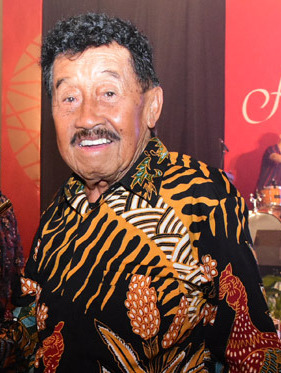

Minister of Trade and Industry
- In office 16 March 1998 – 21 May 1998
- President: Suharto
- Vice President: BJ Habibie
- Preceded by: Tungki Aribowo
- Succeeded by: Rahardi Ramelan

Personal details
- Born: The Kian Seng; 24 February 1931 Semarang, Dutch East Indies
- Died: 31 March 2020 (aged 89) Jakarta, Indonesia
- Cause of death: Lung cancer
- Spouse: Pertiwi Hasan
- Children: 2
- Occupation: Plywood tycoon
- Cabinet: Seventh Development Cabinet

Mohamad "Bob" Hasan (24 February 1931 – 31 March 2020) was an Indonesian businessman, who served briefly as trade and industry minister in 1998 and was later jailed for corruption. He was one of the most prominent ethnic Chinese cronies of long-serving Indonesian president Suharto and was nicknamed "the plywood king" because of his forestry businesses. Hasan served as the chairman of the Indonesian Athletics Association from September 1984 until his death. He was the founder and editor of the Indonesian magazine Gatra.

== Early life ==
Born The Kiang Seng (鄭建盛) in Semarang, Central Java, in February 1931 to a Chinese tobacco trader, Hasan became the adopted son of Gatot Soebroto, a general in the Indonesian Army, who commanded then-Colonel Suharto in the 1950s.

== Business career ==
After Suharto replaced Subroto as commander of the Army's Diponegoro Division, Hasan worked with Suharto to develop a wide range of side businesses, controlled by the military, that provided much of the funding for the Division as well as extra income for its officers.

After Suharto took the presidency in 1966, he initiated a massive expansion of Indonesian commercial logging, especially in the islands outside of Java. In the 1970s, Hasan served as the required Indonesian "partner" for foreign companies wanting to harvest timber in Indonesia, working most notably with the United States corporation Georgia Pacific, and also established a number of joint ventures between his and government-owned companies. In 1981 the government banned the export of unmilled timber, leading to many foreign companies selling their Indonesian operations to domestic owners interested in establishing processing operations; Hasan, already a major shareholder in Georgia Pacific's Indonesia operation, became its sole owner when the company left Indonesia in 1983. Starting from timber, he expanded his business interests into financial, insurance, automotive, and other industries, primarily through his Kalimanis holding company. Hasan's Kalimanis group was reported to control over 2 million hectares (7,700 square miles) of prime concessions in Kalimantan.

Hasan was also Chairman of the Indonesian Wood Panel Association (Apkindo). Under Hasan, Apkindo was given complete control of plywood pricing, marketing, and exports. Apkindo helped Indonesia gain about three-quarters of the worldwide plywood export market by the early 1990s, sometimes using techniques described by observers as "predatory pricing". Hasan personally profited from his chairmanship both by supporting business he owned and through control of the fees paid to the organization by other members. His prominence in the plywood industry led to him being nicknamed "the plywood king".

Hasan ran PT Nusantara Ampera Bakti (Nusamba) which is 80%-owned by foundations controlled by Suharto.

Hasan became the mediator in business disputes between Suharto's six children, after the death of Suharto's wife in 1996. He orchestrated a deal to resolve a shareholder dispute surrounding the Busang gold deposit found by Bre-X Minerals in Kalimantan before the gold find was exposed as a hoax.

== Trade and industry minister ==
Suharto appointed Hasan Minister of Trade and Industry on 14 March 1998, making him the only Indonesian of Chinese descent to join one of Suharto's cabinets. His appointment was viewed as evidence that Suharto was not serious about making substantial fiscal changes to overcome the Asian financial crisis that had begun in mid-1997. As a result of International Monetary Fund (IMF) requirements during the crisis, Apkindo was closed down in 1998. Hasan lost his cabinet post when Suharto quit on 21 May 1998 following mass protests and riots.

== Corruption convictions and imprisonment ==
Hasan was frequently the subject of corruption allegations because of his business dealings and control of much of Indonesian industry. After Suharto stepped down in 1998, a series of court judgements found evidence of crimes. Hasan was fined 50 billion rupiah (US$7 million) as a result of a lawsuit filed by several youth organizations, alleging he had ordered the burning of forests in Sumatra. In February 2001, he was convicted of causing a US$244 million loss to the Indonesian government through a fraudulent forest-mapping project in Java in the early 1990s. He was imprisoned at Cipinang prison and then at the less accessible Nusa Kambangan Island penitentiary off the coast of south-central Java, until his release on parole in February 2004. Hasan was the first and among the most prominent of Suharto's associates convicted of fraud and corruption.

Hasan was a member of the International Olympic Committee from 1994 to 2004, when the IOC expelled him due to his corruption conviction. The IOC was criticized by the Indonesian government in 2000 for arguing that Hasan should be allowed to attend the 2000 Olympic Games in Sydney, Australia, despite his being under arrest at the time.

== Death ==
On 31 March 2020, Hasan died at the age of 89 from lung cancer at Gatot Subroto Army Hospital in Central Jakarta.
