= List of Honduran records in athletics =

The following are the national records in athletics in Honduras maintained by its national athletics federation: Federación Nacional Hondureña de Atletismo (FENHATLE).

== Outdoor ==
Key to tables: Awaiting ratification Record not kept by FENHATLE Not ratified or later rescined by FENHATLE

=== Men ===
Event	Record	Athlete	Date	Meet	Place	Ref.
100 m	10.22 (+0.3 m/s)	Rolando Palacios	18 July 2008		Toluca, Mexico	
100 m	10.20 (+1.6 m/s)	Rolando Palacios	31 January 2010		San Salvador, El Salvador	
200 m	20.40 (−0.9 m/s)	Rolando Palacios	20 July 2008		Toluca, Mexico	
400 m	47.06	Yariel Matute	21 April 2018	Houston Fred Duckett Twilight Meet	Houston, United States	
800 m	1:49.50	Elvin Canales (Note: Elvin Canales became a Spanish citizen on 22 June 2021)	16 June 2021		Guadalajara, Spain	
800 m	1:47.51 (Note: Elvin Canales became a Spanish citizen on 22 June 2021)	Elvin Canales	17 July 2021	Flanders Cup Vita	Ninove, Belgium	
1500 m	3:59.2 h	Jorge Ponce	28 June 1986		Debrecen, Hungary	
3000 m	8:46.0 h	Clovis Morales	19 June 1975		Hagen, West Germany	
5000 m	14:43.87	Ramón Romero	14 April 2022	Bryan Clay Invitational	Azusa, United States	
5000 m	14:31.71	Ramón Romero	14 April 2023	UW-Platteville Invitational	Platteville, United States	
5 km (road)	15:02+	Iván Zarco	17 October 2020	World Half Marathon Championships	Gdynia, Poland	
10,000 m	30:44.8 h	Clovis Morales	3 August 1977		Ludenscheid, Germany	
10 km (road)	30:04+	Iván Zarco	17 October 2020	World Half Marathon Championships	Gdynia, Poland	
15 km (road)	45:20+	Iván Zarco	17 October 2020	World Half Marathon Championships	Gdynia, Poland	
20 km (road)	1:00:53+	Iván Zarco	17 October 2020	World Half Marathon Championships	Gdynia, Poland	
Half marathon	1:04:08	Iván Zarco	17 October 2020	World Half Marathon Championships	Gdynia, Poland	
Marathon	2:17:49	Clovis Morales	24 April 1977		Porz, West Germany	
110 m hurdles	13.72 (+1.5 m/s)	Esteban Guzmán	15 May 2011		Greensboro, United States	
400 m hurdles	51.77	Jonnie Lowe	6 March 2006		Managua, Nicaragua	
3000 m steeplechase	9:23.6 h	Hipolito López	April 1976		Mexico City, Mexico	
High jump	2.00 m	Tulio Quiroz	13 April 2002		Tegucigalpa, Honduras	
High jump	2.00 m	Tulio Quiroz	11 August 2002		San Antonio, United States	
Pole vault	4.30 m	Miguel Negrete (Note: Miguel Negrete opted for Honduras from 2020)	11 April 2021		Lewisburg, United States	
Long jump	7.67 m	Jason Castro	20 April 2012		Guatemala City, Guatemala	
Triple jump	16.04 m	Jason Castro	18 August 2015		Panama City, Panama	
Shot put	19.80 m	Zack Short	12 March 2022	LCC Open	Eugene, United States	
Discus throw	53.54 m	Zack Short	30 March 2019		Sacramento, United States	
Hammer throw	54.36 m	Enrique Reina	17 August 1996		Eeklo, Belgium	
Javelin throw	55.70 m	Ner González	28 October 1989		Tegucigalpa, Honduras	
Decathlon	6690 pts	Darwin Colón	27–28 June 2008		San Pedro Sula, Honduras	
Decathlon	100m (wind) / Long jump (wind) / Shot put / High jump / 400m / 110m H (wind) / Discus / Pole vault / Javelin / 1500m; 11.22 / 6.82 m / 12.91 m / 1.80 m / 50.54 / 14.98 / 38.18 m / 3.40 m / 49.12 m / 5:08.00					
20 km walk (road)	1:25:25	Santiago Fonseca	15 May 1988		Danli, Honduras	
35 km walk (road)	2:54:01+	Jose Romero	20 March 2021	Dudinská Päťdesiatka	Dudince, Slovakia	
50 km walk (road)	4:01:07	Santiago Fonseca	12 January 1986		Guatemala City, Guatemala	
4 × 100 m relay	40.55	Honduras; Melique García; Yariel Matute; Gerom Solis; Kenny Glenn	29 December 2020	Central American Championships	San José, Costa Rica	
4 × 400 m relay	3:19.4 h	Honduras; C.F. Idiaquez; R. Castillo; J. Guity; Geovany Flores	12 January 1990		Tegucigalpa, Honduras	

=== Women ===
Event	Record	Athlete	Date	Meet	Place	Ref.
100 m	12.10 (−0.5 m/s)	Pastora Chávez	26 July 1996	Olympic Games	Atlanta, United States	
100 m	11.93 (−0.1 m/s)	Rori Lowe	13 September 2025	World Championships	Tokyo, Japan	
200 m	25.02 (+1.5 m/s)	Heidy Palacios	16 June 2012	Central American Championships	Managua, Nicaragua	
400 m	55.24	Heidy Palacios	17 June 2012	Central American Championships	Managua, Nicaragua	
800 m	2:22.4 h	Olga Zepeda	22 July 1989		San José, Costa Rica	
1500 m	4:38.77	Magda Castillo	23 April 2004		Havana, Cuba	
3000 m	10:46.3 h	Gina Coello	9 September 1989		San José, Costa Rica	
5000 m	17:58.96	Magda Castillo	25 April 2004		Havana, Cuba	
5 km (road)	20:18+ Wo	Valeria Jazmin Amaya Meija	20 September 2026	World Road Running Championships	Copenhagen, Denmark	
10,000 m	38:56.52	Edith Ramirez	11 December 1997	Central American Games	San Pedro Sula, Honduras	
10 km (road)	40:54+ Wo	Valeria Jazmin Amaya Meija	20 September 2026	World Road Running Championships	Copenhagen, Denmark	
15 km (road)	1:03:15+ Wo	Valeria Jazmin Amaya Meija	20 September 2026	World Road Running Championships	Copenhagen, Denmark	
20 km (road)	1:25:09+ Wo	Valeria Jazmin Amaya Meija	20 September 2026	World Road Running Championships	Copenhagen, Denmark	
Half marathon	1:29:48 Wo	Valeria Jazmin Amaya Meija	20 September 2026	World Road Running Championships	Copenhagen, Denmark	
Marathon	2:57:17	Magda Castillo	12 August 2001	World Championships	Edmonton, Canada	
100 m hurdles	13.83 (−0.6 m/s)	Jeimy Bernárdez	19 July 2008		Toluca, Mexico	
400 m hurdles	1:10.70	Miriam Ávila	27 July 1989		San Juan, Puerto Rico	
3000 m steeplechase	11:28.96	Aldy González	20 June 2014		Tegucigalpa, Honduras	
High jump	1.55 m	Dennise Reyes	27 March 2021		Houston, United States	
Pole vault	2.70 m	Aimee Zelaya	1 July 2017		Tegucigalpa, Honduras	
Pole vault	2.70 m	Aimee Zelaya	28 July 2017		Managua, Nicaragua	
Pole vault	2.70 m	Aimee Zelaya	13 July 2018		Guatemala City, Guatemala	
Long jump	5.45 m	Dennise Reyes	23 March 2019		Houston, United States	
Triple jump	11.60 m	Pastora Chávez	3 December 1994		Tegucigalpa, Honduras	
Shot put	11.45 m	Gabrielle Figueroa	26 June 2021		San José, Costa Rica	
Discus throw	43.10 m	Alma Guitierrez	9 December 2017	Central American Games	Managua, Nicaragua	
Hammer throw	62.24 m	Gabriela Figueroa	30 April 2022	Ashland Alumni Open	Ashland, United States	
Javelin throw	42.95 m	Esther Padilla	15 May 2022		San Pedro Sula, Honduras	
Heptathlon	4139 pts	Dennise Reyes	4–5 April 2019	SFA Carl Kight Invitational	Nacogdoches, United States	
Heptathlon	100m H (wind) / High jump / Shot put / 200m (wind) / Long jump (wind) / Javelin / 800m; 14.99 (+0.2 m/s) / 1.47 m / 8.85 m / 26.09 (+1.2 m/s) (Note: by result source, 26.03 by World Athletics source) / 5.28 m (+1.1 m/s) / 29.27 m / 2:59.99					
20 km walk (road)	2:46:40	Rosa Estrada	30/31 January 2010		San Salvador, El Salvador	
4 × 100 m relay	49.51	Honduras; Mirta Martinez; Samantha Fernández; Jeimy Bernárdez; Jessica Lino	5 March 2006		Managua, Nicaragua	
4 × 400 m relay	4:14.3 h	Honduras; Miriam Ávila; Petrona Arriola; R. Sierra; D. Ochoa	12 January 1990		Tegucigalpa, Honduras	

== Indoor ==
=== Men ===
Event	Record	Athlete	Date	Meet	Place	Ref.
55 m	6.19	Melique Garcia	19 February 2019	Armory Sprint Night Series	New York City, United States	
60 m	6.62	Rolando Palacios	26 February 2009	Prague Indoor Meeting	Prague, Czech Republic	
200 m	21.53	Yariel Matute	23 February 2019	Western Athletic Conference Championships	Nampa, United States	
400 m	47.80	Yariel Matute	17 February 2018	Texas A&M Aggie Twilight	College Station, United States	
800 m	1:51.08	Elvin Canalés	7 March 2020		Sabadell, Spain	
800 m	1:49.27	Elvin Canales (Note: Honduran until 27 June 2024; eligible to represent Spain in National Representative Competitions from 28 June 2024)	8 February 2022	Míting Internacional de Catalunya	Sabadell, Spain	
1000 m	2:57.29	Elvin Canales	25 January 2015		Sabadell, Spain	
1500 m	3:58.56 (Note: outdoor mark ratified as absolute record)	Elvin Canales	10 January 2020	Control Meeting	Sabadell, Spain	
Mile	4:31.88	Ramón Romero	1 February 2020	Mark Schuck Open	Mankato, United States	
3000 m	8:40.79	Ramón Romero	22 January 2022	Lake Michigan Open	Kenosha, United States	
3000 m	8:35.40 OT	Ramón Romero	12 February 2022	GVSU Big Meet	Allendale, United States	
5000 m	15:15.81	Ramón Romero	29 January 2022	Mark Schuck Open and Multi	Mankato, United States	
60 m hurdles	8.04	Ronald Beneth	14 February 2009	Reunión Internacional	Valencia, Spain	
High jump	1.74 m (Note: record set during heptathlon competition)	Miguel Negrete	3 December 2021	Bison Opener	Lewisburg, United States	
Pole vault	4.72 m (Note: outdoor mark ratified as absolute record)	Miguel Negrete (Note: Miguel Negrete opted for Honduras from 2020)	7 March 2020	NYSPHSAA - New York State Championships	Staten Island, United States	
Long jump	6.84 m	Kessel Campbell	23 February 2008	Reunión Internacional	Valencia, Spain	
Triple jump						
Shot put	19.81 m A	Zack Short	22 February 2019	Big Sky Conference Championships	Bozeman, United States	
Heptathlon	4597 pts	Miguel Negrete	3–4 December 2021	Bison Opener	Lewisburg, United States	
Heptathlon	60m / Long jump / Shot put / High jump / 60m H / Pole vault / 1000m; 7.34 / 6.57 m / 11.22 m / 1.74 m / 9.27 / 4.55 m / 3:15.41					
5000 m walk						
4 × 400 m relay						

=== Women ===
Event	Record	Athlete	Date	Meet	Place	Ref.
60 m	8.18	Kendi Rosales	2 March 2018	World Championships	Birmingham, United Kingdom	
200 m	25.36	Heidy Palacios	5 December 2009		New Haven, United States	
400 m	56.31	Heidy Palacios	12 February 2011		Boston, United States	
600 m	1:56.51	Andrea Bardales	8 February 2025	UAB Green and Gold Invitational	Birmingham, United States	
800 m	3:18.72 (Note: record set during pentathlon competition)	Dennise Reyes	24 February 2019		Birmingham, United States	
1500 m						
3000 m						
60 m hurdles	8.52	Jeimy Bernárdez	21 February 2009		Seville, Spain	
High jump	1.37 m (Note: record set during pentathlon competition)	Dennise Reyes	24 February 2019		Birmingham, United States	
Pole vault						
Long jump	5.34 m	Dennise Reyes	25 January 2019		Houston, United States	
Triple jump						
Shot put	8.37 m (Note: record set during pentathlon competition)	Dennise Reyes	24 February 2019		Birmingham, United States	
Pentathlon	2569 pts	Dennise Reyes	24 February 2019		Birmingham, United States	
Pentathlon	60m H / High jump / Shot put / Long jump / 800m; 9.47 / 1.37 m / 8.37 m / 5.29 m / 3:18.72					
3000 m walk						
4 × 400 m relay						
