= Indonesia at the 1983 World Championships in Athletics =

- Flag of Indonesia
- WA code: INA

in Helsinki, Finland August 7–14, 1983
- Competitors: 1 (1 man) in 2 events

World Championships in Athletics appearances
- 1983; 1987; 1991; 1993; 1995; 1997; 1999; 2001; 2003; 2005; 2007; 2009; 2011; 2013; 2015; 2017; 2019; 2022; 2023

Indonesia competed at the 1983 World Championships in Athletics in Helsinki, Finland, from August 7 to 14, 1983.

== Men ==
Track and road events

Athlete	Event	Heat		Quarterfinal		Semifinal		Final	
Athlete	Event	Result	Rank	Result	Rank	Result	Rank	Result	Rank
Mohamed Purnomo	100 metres	10.76	39	Did not advance					
Mohamed Purnomo	200 metres	21.88	36	Did not advance					
