= San Marino at the 2023 World Athletics Championships =

- Flag of San Marino
- WA code: SMR

in Budapest, Hungary 19 August 2023 – 27 August 2023
- Competitors: 1 (1 man and 0 women)
- Medals: Gold 0 Silver 0 Bronze 0 Total 0

World Athletics Championships appearances
- 1983; 1987; 1991; 1993; 1995; 1997; 1999; 2001; 2003; 2005; 2007; 2009; 2011; 2013; 2015; 2017; 2019; 2022; 2023

San Marino competed at the 2023 World Athletics Championships in Budapest, Hungary, which were held from 19 to 27 August 2023. The athlete delegation of the country was composed of one competitor, hurdler Andrea Ercolani Volta who would compete in the men's 400 metres hurdles. He qualified upon being selected by the San Marino Athletics Federation. Alsadi placed last in his heat out of the nine competitors that competed in his heat and did not advance to the semifinals.

== Background ==
The 2023 World Athletics Championships in Budapest, Hungary, were held from 19 to 27 August 2023. The Championships were held at the National Athletics Centre. To qualify for the World Championships, athletes had to reach an entry standard (e.g. time or distance), place in a specific position at select competitions, be a wild card entry, or qualify through their World Athletics Ranking at the end of the qualification period.

As San Marino did not meet any of the four standards, they could send either one male or one female athlete in one event of the Championships who has not yet qualified. The San Marino Athletics Federation selected hurdler Andrea Ercolani Volta who previously competed for the nation at the 2019 World Championships in Athletics held in Doha.

== Results ==
Key

- Q = Qualified for the next round
- q = Qualified for the next round as a fastest loser or, in field events, by position without achieving the qualifying target
- NR = National record
- PB = Personal best
- SB = Season best
- N/A = Round not applicable for the event

=== Men ===
Volta competed in the heats of the men's 400 metres hurdles on 20 August against eight other competitors in his round. He raced in the second heat and recorded a time of 52.69 seconds. There, he placed last in the heat and did not advance further to the semifinals.

Track and road events

Athlete	Event	Heat		Semifinal		Final	
Athlete	Event	Result	Rank	Result	Rank	Result	Rank
Andrea Ercolani Volta	400 metres hurdles	52.69	9	Did not advance			
