= Iván Zarco =

Honduran long-distance runner

Iván Zarco Alvarez
Personal information
- Born: 8 February 1984 (age 42) Barcelona, Spain

Sport
- Country: Honduras
- Sport: Athletics
- Event: Long-distance running

Iván Zarco Alvarez (born 8 February 1984) is a Honduran long-distance runner. In 2020, he competed in the men's race at the 2020 World Athletics Half Marathon Championships held in Gdynia, Poland. In the 2020 Tokyo Olympic Games he represented Honduras in the marathon, and finished last, in the 76th place.

He represented Spain until the end of 2019 and, as of 1 January 2020, he represents Honduras in international competitions. In 2020, at the World Athletics Half Marathon Championships in Gdynia, he set a Honduran national record in half-marathon, finishing the race at 1:04.08. Zarco made headlines in March 2021, when he was scheduled to run a marathon in Dresden but instead gave his number to the former compatriot Camilo Santiago who ran as Zarco and finished in 2:17.46, which would have been a new record of Honduras. The switch was swiftly discovered and Santiago was disqualified for two years; the sanction was annulled in August 2021 by the Administrative Court. Zarco was not sanctioned initially, since no obvious motive was discovered in his actions. In 2023, both were suspended for six months. On May 22, 2022, Zarco became international again, competing in the Ibero-American Athletics Championships in Alicante (Spain). He placed ninth in the half marathon event with a time of 1:10:30.

On October 1, 2023, he participated in the Route World Championships in Riga, Latvia, in the half marathon event, finishing in 82nd position with a time of 1:09:07.

On March 30, 2024, he competed at the World Cross Country Championships in Belgrade, Serbia. He achieved a time of 35:01, and placed 93rd.

== Competition record ==
Representing Honduras
Year	Competition	Venue	Position	Event	Notes
2021	2020 Summer Olympics	Sapporo, Japan	76th	Marathon	2:44.36
