= Dinesh Kumar Dhakal =

Bhutanese sprinter

Personal information
- Born: 5 May 1996 (age 29)

Sport
- Country: Bhutan
- Sport: Athletics
- Event: 100 metres

Dinesh Kumar Dhakal (born 5 May 1996) is a Bhutanese male track and field athlete who competes in the 100 metres. He was his country's sole representative at the 2019 World Athletics Championships, where he competed in the preliminary round of the 100 m and recorded a Bhutanese record of 11.64 seconds.

== International competitions ==
Year	Competition	Venue	Position	Event	Notes
2019	World Championships	Doha, Qatar	24th (p)	100 metres	11.64 NR
