= Vietnam at the 2009 World Championships in Athletics =

- WA code: VIE

in Berlin
- Competitors: 2
- Medals: Gold 0 Silver 0 Bronze 0 Total 0

World Championships in Athletics appearances
- 1983; 1987; 1991; 1993; 1995; 1997; 1999; 2001; 2003; 2005–2007; 2009; 2011; 2013; 2015; 2017; 2019; 2022; 2023; 2025

Vietnam competed at the 2009 World Championships in Athletics from 15 to 23 August. A team of 2 athletes was announced in preparation for the competition.

== Results ==
Field events

Athlete	Event	Qualification		Final	
Athlete	Event	Distance	Position	Distance	Position
Bùi Thị Nhung	High Jump	NM			

Key

- Note–Ranks given for track events are within the athlete's heat only
- Q = Qualified for the next round
- q = Qualified for the next round as a fastest loser or, in field events, by position without achieving the qualifying target
- NR = National record
- PB = Personal best
- N/A = Round not applicable for the event
- Bye = Athlete not required to compete in round

== Team selection ==
Field and combined events

Event	Athletes	
Event	Men	Women
High jump		Bui Thi Nhung
Triple jump	Nguyen Van Hung	
