= Paraguay at the 2023 World Athletics Championships =

- Flag of Paraguay
- WA code: PAR

in Budapest, Hungary 19 August 2023 – 27 August 2023
- Competitors: 2 (2 men and 0 women)
- Medals: Gold 0 Silver 0 Bronze 0 Total 0

World Athletics Championships appearances
- 1983; 1987; 1991; 1993; 1995; 1997; 1999; 2001; 2003; 2005; 2007; 2009; 2011; 2013; 2015; 2017; 2019; 2022; 2023

Paraguay competed at the 2023 World Athletics Championships in Budapest, Hungary, from 19 to 27 August 2023. The athlete delegation of the country was composed of one competitor, long-distance runner Derlys Ayala who would compete in the men's marathon. He qualified through his world ranking. Sprinter César Almirón also qualified for the World Championships through his world ranking and was expected to compete in the men's 200 metres but eventually did not start in the event. In the marathon, Ayala did not finish the race and was unranked out of the 85 competitors that competed.

== Background ==
The 2023 World Athletics Championships in Budapest, Hungary, were held from 19 to 27 August 2023. The Championships were held at the National Athletics Centre. To qualify for the World Championships, athletes had to reach an entry standard (e.g. time or distance), place in a specific position at select competitions, be a wild card entry, or qualify through their World Athletics Ranking at the end of the qualification period.

Marathoner Derlys Ayala and sprinter César Almirón qualified for the World Championships after being ranked high enough within the World Athletics Rankings. This would be Almirón's second appearance at the World Championships after he competed at the 2022 World Athletics Championships while it was the third for Ayala after competing at the 2017 and 2019 World Athletics Championships, while he had to drop out of the 2022 World Athletics Championships due to a travel visa issue.

== Results ==
Key

- Q = Qualified for the next round
- q = Qualified for the next round as a fastest loser or, in field events, by position without achieving the qualifying target
- NR = National record
- PB = Personal best
- SB = Season best
- N/A = Round not applicable for the event

=== Men ===
Almirón did not compete in his entered event, the men's 200 metres. Ayala competed in the men's marathon on 27 August against 84 other competitors. He did not finish the race and was unranked.

Track and road events

Athlete	Event	Heat		Semifinal		Final	
Athlete	Event	Result	Rank	Result	Rank	Result	Rank
Derlys Ayala	Marathon	—				DNF	
