= Vietnam at the 2013 World Championships in Athletics =

- WA code: VIE
- National federation: Vietnam Athletics Federation
- Website: www.dienkinh.vn

in Moscow
- Competitors: 1
- Medals: Gold 0 Silver 0 Bronze 0 Total 0

World Championships in Athletics appearances
- 1983; 1987; 1991; 1993; 1995; 1997; 1999; 2001; 2003; 2005–2007; 2009; 2011; 2013; 2015; 2017; 2019; 2022; 2023

Vietnam competed at the 2013 World Championships in Athletics from August 10–18 in Moscow, Russia. One athlete was announced to represent the country in the event.

== Results ==
Women
Track & road events

Athlete	Event	Final	
Athlete	Event	Result	Rank
Nguyễn Thị Thanh Phúc	20 km walk	1:36:27	48
