= Sangay Wangchuk =

Bhutanese long-distance runner (born 1983)

Personal information
- Full name: Sangay Wangchuk
- Nationality: Bhutanese
- Born: Bhutan

Sport
- Sport: Track and field
- Event: long-distance running

Sangay Wangchuk (born 1983) is a Bhutanese long-distance runner who set a national record in the men's marathon at the 2009 World Championships in Athletics on August 22, 2009. Wangchuk's time of 2:47:55 broke the previous best of 3:00:17 set by Kencho Norbu on November 13, 2002, in Thimphu. Bhutan Today reported that Wangchuk, a member of Royal Bhutan Army, turned in a time of 2:52 at the Third Coronation Marathon in Wangdue Phodrang on May 23, 2010, but finished second to Pasang Pasang (2:44:21).

== See also ==
- List of Bhutanese records in athletics
- National records in the marathon
