= Indonesian Athletics Association =

Governing body of athletics in Indonesia

- Persatuan Atletik Seluruh Indonesia
- Sport: Athletics
- Jurisdiction: National
- Abbreviation: PASI
- Founded: 3 September 1950; 75 years ago
- Affiliation: World Athletics
- Regional affiliation: Asian Athletics Association
- Headquarters: Jakarta
- Location: Indonesia
- Chairman: Luhut Binsar Pandjaitan
- Secretary: Tigor Mangapul Tanjung
- Replaced: Nederlandsche Indische Athletik Unie (NIAU)
- (founded): 1917; 108 years ago

Official website
- www.pbpasi.org
- (Indonesia)

The Indonesian Athletics Association (Indonesian: Persatuan Atletik Seluruh Indonesia; abbreviated as PASI) is the World Athletics recognized national governing body for the sport of athletics in Indonesia. They are a member of the World Athletics and the Asian Athletics Association. They are also a member of the National Sports Committee of Indonesia (KONI) and the Indonesian Olympic Committee (KOI).

== History ==
=== Origin ===
==== Pre-Independence: NIAU ====
The sport of athletics first entered Indonesia before independence, during the Dutch colonialism era when Indonesia was named Dutch East Indies. In the 1910s, athletics entered school curriculum as one of the school subject. The sport began to spread throughout the country, spearheaded by the formation of many athletic clubs such as ISV, Hellas, and IAC in Jakarta, ABA in Solo, and PAS in Surabaya.

Many such clubs were members of the Nederlandsche Indische Athletik Unie, or NIAU or the Athletics Association of the Dutch East Indies (Indonesian: Perserikatan Atletik Hindia Belanda), formed in 1917. NIAU was the sole nationwide athletic organization in the country; hence, it's responsible for organizing domestic athletics competition in the Dutch East Indies.

The development of the sport gathered more momentum during the Japanese occupation.

==== Post-Independence: PORI's athletics division ====
However after independence, NIAU can no longer be maintained and was disbanded. In 1947, the Sports Association of the Republic of Indonesia (Indonesian: Persatuan Olahraga Republik Indonesia; abbreviated as PORI) was formed to be a forum for national sports activities in the newly found Republics. PORI have an athletics division which served as the foundation for PASI.

=== Founding ===
There were disputes over when PASI was first founded. The origin story remains the same, as does the date of September 3. However, there were differences over the year when PASI was founded and where the event took place. Kompas mentioned that the founding of PASI was on September 3, 1958, in Jakarta. PASI's official website, meanwhile, citing Eddy Purnomo and Dapan's Dasar-Dasar Atletik, mentioned that the founding of PASI happened on September 3, 1950, in Semarang.

Whatever the version, PASI was founded in the 1950s and remains the only umbrella for the sport of athletics in Indonesia to this very day.

== Chairmanship ==
For most of its existence, PASI was famously led by a businessman and a former minister of trade and industry named Bob Hasan, also known as Bung Hasan. First elected in 1976 to replace Sayidiman Suryohadiprojo, H. Mohammad Hassan led PASI until his death on March 31, 2020 due to cancer at the age of 89 years old. His commitment and dedication to the world of athletics began with his passion for running. This passion brought him to the chairmanship of PASI which was offered to him by President Suharto himself. He led PASI diligently. He often used his own money to bankroll PASI. For that dedication, Hasan was named 'the father of Indonesian athletics' after he was elected as PASI's chairman for the 2016–2020 period.

Currently, Luhut Binsar Pandjaitan holds the position for the 2021–2025 period.
