= List of Bhutanese records in athletics =

The following are the national records in athletics in Bhutan maintained by the Bhutan Amateur Athletic Federation (BAAF).

== Outdoor ==
Key to tables: Awaiting ratification Record not kept by BAAF

=== Men ===
Event	Record	Athlete	Date	Meet	Place	Ref.
100 m	11.64 (±0.0 m/s)	Dinesh Kumar Dhakal	27 September 2019	World Championships	Doha, Qatar	
100 m	11.30 NWI #	Dinesh Kumar	9 July 2016	13th National School Meet	Thimphu, Bhutan	
100 m	11.3 h NWI	Chencho Gyeltshen	13 July 2014		Thimphu, Bhutan	
100 m	11.4 h NWI	Kinley Tenzin	December 2011		Punakha, Bhutan	
100 m	11.4 h NWI	Naresh Ghally	December 2011		Punakha, Bhutan	
100 m	11.4 h NWI	Tshering Norbu	28 December 2000		Punakha, Bhutan	
100 m	11.4 h NWI	Pema Wangchuk	12 December 2001		Phuntsholing, Bhutan	
200 m	22.83 (+0.5 m/s)	Tshering Penjor	15 July 2023	Asian Championships	Bangkok, Thailand	
200 m	22.83 (−3.0 m/s)	Tshering Penjor	1 October 2023	Asian Games	Hangzhou, China	
200 m	22.46 #	Robin Thamang	12 December 2001		Phuntsholing, Bhutan	
400 m	57.37	Bal Bahadur Thamang	3 April 2004	South Asian Games	Islamabad, Pakistan	
400 m	53.4 h	Bal Bahadur Thamang	19 July 2002		Thimphu, Bhutan	
800 m	2:05.05	Kinzang Dorji	26 September 1999	South Asian Games	Kathmandu, Nepal	
1500 m	4:08.09	Lungten Tshering	15 June 2004		Ipoh, Malaysia	
3000 m	9:28.0	Kuenzang Norbu	12 June 2001		Punakha, Bhutan	
5000 m	15:16.84	Gawa Zangpo	6 December 2019		Kathmandu, Nepal	
5000 m	14:33.43 (Note: One lap short)	Gawa Zangpo	24 April 2019	Asian Championships	Doha, Qatar	
10,000 m	38:39.7 h	Dhoman Tenzin	22 September 1984	South Asian Games	Kathmandu, Nepal	
Half marathon	1:15:19	Sangay Wangchuk	6 October 2012	World Half Marathon Championships	Kavarna, Bulgaria	
25 km (road)	1:30:58+	Sangay Wangchuk	4 September 2011	World Championships	Daegu, South Korea	
30 km (road)	1:50:08+	Sangay Wangchuk	4 September 2011	World Championships	Daegu, South Korea	
Marathon	2:36:58	Gawa Zangpo	7 March 2020		Punakha, Bhutan	
Marathon	2:36:20	Gawa Zangpo	2 June 2024	Coronation Marathon	Paro, Bhutan	
110 m hurdles						
400 m hurdles						
3000 m steeplechase						
High jump	1.88 m	Mipham Yoezer Gurung	20 July 2019		Thimphu, Bhutan	
Pole vault						
Long jump	6.74 m NWI	Tashi Dendup	8 July 2016	13th National School Meet	Thimphu, Bhutan	
Triple jump	13.81 m NWI	Karma Rigyel	7 July 2019	16th National School Meet	Thimphu, Bhutan	
Shot put	13.11 m	Phub Gyeltshen	20 July 2019		Thimphu, Bhutan	
Shot put	16.45 m	Sonam Rinzin	July 2019	16th National School meet	Thimphu, Bhutan	
Discus throw	39.00 m	Tamyang Tashi	21 January 2003		Phuntsholing, Bhutan	
Hammer throw						
Javelin throw	50.50 m	Tashi Wangchuk	5 January 2005		Thimphu, Bhutan	
Decathlon						
Decathlon	100m / Long jump / Shot put / High jump / 400m / 110m H / Discus / Pole vault / Javelin / 1500m					
20 km walk (road)						
50 km walk (road)						
4 × 100 m relay	46.1	D. Kumar; D. Ghalley; D. Dorj; M. Tshering	9–13 July 2014		Thimphu, Bhutan	
4 × 400 m relay	4:10.1	Bhutan	1992		Thimphu, Bhutan	

=== Women ===
Event	Record	Athlete	Date	Meet	Place	Ref.
100 m	14.41 (−0.3 m/s)	Samgay Wangmo	3 June 2016	Asian Junior Championships	Ho Chi Minh City, Vietnam	
100 m	14.3 h	Namgay Wangmo	1997		Thimphu, Bhutan	
100 m	13.75 (NWI)	Samgay Wangmo	9 July 2016	13th National Schools Athletics Meet	Thimphu, Bhutan	
200 m	30.87	Sangay Wangmo	22 August 2014		Nanjing, China	
200 m	28.78 (NWI)	Sangay Wangmo	8 July 2016	13th National School Meet	Thimphu, Bhutan	
400 m	1:08.2 h	Khandu Lhamo	12 December 2001		Phuntsholing, Bhutan	
400 m	1:07.10	Pratiksha Pradhan	2019	16th National School Meet	Thimphu, Bhutan	
800 m	2:37.40	Chimi Wangmo	6 May 2018		Colombo, Sri Lanka	
1500 m	5:21.3 h	Tandin Pema	22 December 2002		Phuntsholing, Bhutan	
3000 m	12:01.1 h	Ugyen Pema	12 December 2001		Phuntsholing, Bhutan	
5000 m						
5 km (road)	21:06+	Deki Yangzom	4 November 2018	New York City Marathon	New York City, United States	
10,000 m						
10 km (road)	42:14+	Deki Yangzom	4 November 2018	New York City Marathon	New York City, United States	
15 km (road)	1:03:57+	Deki Yangzom	4 November 2018	New York City Marathon	New York City, United States	
20 km (road)	1:26:18+	Deki Yangzom	4 November 2018	New York City Marathon	New York City, United States	
Half marathon	1:31:23+	Deki Yangzom	4 November 2018	New York City Marathon	New York City, United States	
25 km (road)	1:49:57+	Deki Yangzom	4 November 2018	New York City Marathon	New York City, United States	
30 km (road)	2:13:08+	Deki Yangzom	4 November 2018	New York City Marathon	New York City, United States	
Marathon	3:15:04	Deki Yangzom	4 November 2018	New York City Marathon	New York City, United States	
100 m hurdles						
400 m hurdles						
3000 m steeplechase						
High jump	1.36 m	Dawa Palden	8 July 2016	13th National School Meet	Thimphu, Bhutan	
Pole vault						
Long jump	5.47 m	Tashi Dema	22 January 2003		Thimphu, Bhutan	
Triple jump	9.80 m NWI	Tenzin Choden	8 July 2016	13th National School Meet	Thimphu, Bhutan	
Shot put	11.74 m	Phup Lhamngmo	25-28 December 2000		Punakha, Bhutan	
Discus throw	31.18 m	Namkha Lhamo	13 December 2001		Phuntsholing, Bhutan	
Hammer throw						
Javelin throw	38.92 m	Chechay	13 December 2001		Phuntsholing, Bhutan	
Heptathlon						
Heptathlon	100m H / High jump / Shot put / 200m / Long jump / Javelin / 800m					
20 km walk (road)						
50 km walk (road)						
4 × 100 m relay	56.5 h	Samgay Wangmo; Tenzin Choden; T. Lham; P. Seldon	4–9 July 2015		Thimphu, Bhutan	
4 × 400 m relay						

== Indoor ==
=== Men ===
Event	Record	Athlete	Date	Meet	Place	Ref.
60 m	7.64	Kinley Tenzin	31 October 2009	Asian Indoor Games	Hanoi, Vietnam	
200 m						
400 m						
800 m						
1500 m	4:20.68	Kezang Dorji	30 October 2007	Asian Indoor Games	Macau	
3000 m	9:45.67	Pema Tshewang	1 November 2007	Asian Indoor Games	Macau	
60 m hurdles						
High jump						
Pole vault						
Long jump						
Triple jump						
Shot put						
Heptathlon						
Heptathlon	60m / Long jump / Shot put / High jump / 60m H / Pole vault / 1000m					
5000 m walk						
4 × 400 m relay						

=== Women ===
Event	Record	Athlete	Date	Meet	Place	Ref.
60 m						
200 m						
400 m						
800 m						
1500 m						
3000 m						
60 m hurdles						
High jump						
Pole vault						
Long jump						
Triple jump						
Shot put						
Pentathlon						
Pentathlon	60m H / High jump / Shot put / Long jump / 800m					
3000 m walk						
4 × 400 m relay						
