= Melique García =

Honduran-American sprinter

Personal information
- Nationality: Honduran / American
- Born: Melique Howland García; 18 June 1992 (age 34) New York City, New York, United States
- Height: 5 ft 7 in (170 cm)
- Weight: 160

Sport
- Sport: Athletics
- Event: Sprinting

Melique Vencent García (born 18 June 1992) is an athlete competing in the sprinting events. Born in the United States, he represents Honduras internationally.

== Family ==
Melique García was born on 18 June 1992 in New York, United States. His father, Melvin Lorenzo, is originally from Puerto Cortés, Honduras and his mother, Barbara Lynetta from South Carolina, United States.

== Career ==
=== Early years ===
He became a member of the track and field team at Watervliet High School. During his high school years he suffered an ACL tear in his right leg playing American football removing him from sports which many say is a career ending injury. He returned later that year for the outdoor Track & Field season. Between 2012 and 2015 he represented the Cortland Red Dragons. He qualified these years for multiple events at the NCAA Division III men's indoor track and field championships and finished second in the 200 metres event in 2015. He became three-time All-American in indoor and outdoor track and won six SUNYAC titles at SUNY Cortland.

=== International career ===
He joined the international scene in the men's 100 metres and 200 metres at the 2018 NACAC Championships. He competed in the Men's 100m and 200m events at the 2019 CADICA Championships in Managua, Nicaragua; where he became runner-up in the 100m. He competed in the men's 100 metres event for Honduras at the 2019 World Athletics Championships. He competed in the preliminary round and he did not advance to compete in the heats.

He qualified for the 2020 Summer Olympics, but due to a passport issue he couldn't compete.

He competed in the men's 100 metres event for Honduras at the 2022 World Athletics Championships where he finished with a time om 10.70 seconds 12th in the preliminary round and was eliminated in the next round.

He set Honduras national records in the indoor 55 metres at the Armory Sprint Night Series in 2019; 200 metres and in the 4×100 metres relay at the Central American Championships in Athletics in 2020.
