= Vietnam Athletics Federation =

Governing body of athletics in Vietnam

- Liên đoàn điền kinh Việt Nam
- Founded: 1962
- Affiliation: World Athletics
- Regional affiliation: Asian Athletics
- Headquarters: Hanoi
- President: Hoàng Vệ Dũng

Official website
- www.dienkinh.vn

The Vietnam Athletics Federation (VAF; Vietnamese: Liên đoàn điền kinh Việt Nam) is the national governing body for the sport of athletics in Vietnam.

== Presidents ==
- Tạ Quang Bửu
- Phạm Song
- Trương Mộc Lâm
- Tạ Quang Ngọc
- Lê Dương Quang (2009 - 2013)
- Hoàng Vệ Dũng (2014 - 2023)
