= Honduran National Athletics Federation =

- Federación Nacional Hondureña de Atletismo
- Sport: Athletics
- Jurisdiction: Federation
- Abbreviation: FENHATLE
- Founded: 1951
- Affiliation: World Athletics
- Regional affiliation: NACAC
- Headquarters: Tegucigalpa
- President: Calixto Sierra
- Secretary: Alex Navas
- (Honduras)

The Honduran National Athletics Federation (Spanish: Federación Nacional Hondureña de Atletismo, FENHATLE) is the governing body for the sport of athletics in Honduras. Current president is Calixto Sierra. He was re-elected for the period 2012-2014 in May 2012.

== History ==
FENHATLE was founded in 1951.

== Affiliations ==
FENHATLE is the national member federation for Honduras in the following international organisations:

- World Athletics
- North American, Central American and Caribbean Athletic Association (NACAC)
- Association of Panamerican Athletics (APA)
- Asociación Iberoamericana de Atletismo (AIA; Ibero-American Athletics Association)
- Central American and Caribbean Athletic Confederation (CACAC)
- Confederación Atlética del Istmo Centroamericano (CADICA; Central American Isthmus Athletic Confederation)

Moreover, it is part of the following national organisations:

- Honduran Olympic Committee (COH; Spanish: Comité Olímpico Hondureño)

== National records ==
FENHATLE maintains the Honduran records in athletics.
