= Tennis at the 2019 Summer Universiade – Women's doubles =

Women's doubles at the XXX Summer Universiade
- Venue: Circolo Tennis and Lungomare
- Dates: July 6, 2019 – July 12, 2019
- Competitors: 58 from 29 nations
- Teams: 29

Medalists
1st place, gold medalist(s)		Guo Hanyu; Ye Qiuyu	China
2nd place, silver medalist(s)		Lee Pei-chi; Lee Ya-hsuan	Chinese Taipei
3rd place, bronze medalist(s)		Kanako Morisaki; Naho Sato	Japan
3rd place, bronze medalist(s)		Eudice Chong; Maggie Ng	Hong Kong

Women's doubles
- Tennis at the 2019 Summer Universiade

Events
Singles	men	women
Doubles	men	women	mixed
Team	men	women
← 2017 ·	Summer Universiade	· 2021 →

The women's doubles tennis event at the 2019 Summer Universiade was held from 6 to 12 July at the Circolo Tennis and Lungomare in Naples, Italy.

China's Guo Hanyu and Ye Qiuyu won the gold medals, defeating Chinese Taipei's Lee Pei-chi and Lee Ya-hsuan in the final, 6–7^{(8–10)}, 6–2, [10–8].

Japan's Kanako Morisaki and Naho Sato, and Hong Kong's Eudice Chong and Maggie Ng won the bronze medals.

== Seeds ==
The top three seeds receive a bye into the second round.

1. Guo Hanyu / Ye Qiuyu (CHN) (champions; gold medalists)
2. Lee Pei-chi / Lee Ya-hsuan (TPE) (final; Silver Medalists)
3. Victoria Kan / Yana Sizikova (RUS) (second round)
4. Eudice Chong / Maggie Ng (HKG) (semifinals; Bronze Medalists)
5. Kanako Morisaki / Naho Sato (JPN) (semifinals; Bronze Medalists)
6. Chompoothip Jundakate / Tamachan Momkoonthod (THA) (second round)
7. Anna Kubareva / Katyarina Paulenka (BLR) (first round)
8. Dariya Detkovskaya / Zhibek Kulambayeva (KAZ) (first round)

== Draw ==
=== Key ===
- Q = Qualifier
- WC = Wild card
- LL = Lucky loser
- Alt = Alternate
- ITF = ITF entry
- PR = Protected ranking
- SR = Special ranking
- SE = Special exempt
- JE = Junior exempt
- JR = Junior Accelerator Programme entrant
- CO = College Accelerator Programme entrant
- NG = Next Gen Accelerator Program entrant
- w/o = Walkover
- r = Retired
- d = Defaulted

=== Finals ===
Semifinals
1	Guo Hanyu (CHN); Ye Qiuyu (CHN)	7^{7}	6
5	Kanako Morisaki (JPN); Naho Sato (JPN)	6^{3}	1
4	Eudice Chong (HKG); Maggie Ng (HKG)	1	6	[3]
2	Lee Pei-chi (TPE); Lee Ya-hsuan (TPE)	6	3	[10]

Final
1	Guo Hanyu (CHN); Ye Qiuyu (CHN)	6^{8}	6	[10]
2	Lee Pei-chi (TPE); Lee Ya-hsuan (TPE)	7^{10}	2	[8]

=== Top half ===
First round
V Koberlingová (SVK); K Strešnáková (SVK)	5	7^{7}	[12]
I Mesquita (POR); AF Santos (POR)	7	6^{5}	[10]
P Brglez (SLO); KT Godec (SLO)	0	4
M Orange (FRA); A Robbe (FRA)	6	6
D Šumová (CZE); A Zarycká (CZE)	3	6	[10]
8	D Detkovskaya (KAZ); Z Kulambayeva (KAZ)	6	2	[7]
L Bakhodirova (UZB); K Umarova (UZB)	4	0
F Contreras (MEX); AR Villarreal (MEX)	6	6
L Kraus (AUT); A Weiss (AUT)	6	6
EL Dela Cruz (PHI); HG Dela Cruz (PHI)	1	0
M Landmann (RSA); H-W van Zyl (RSA)	2	3
5	K Morisaki (JPN); N Sato (JPN)	6	6

Second round
1	H Guo (CHN); Q Ye (CHN)	6	6
V Koberlingová (SVK); K Strešnáková (SVK)	1	3
M Orange (FRA); A Robbe (FRA)	4	3
D Šumová (CZE); A Zarycká (CZE)	6	6
3	V Kan (RUS); Y Sizikova (RUS)	2	6	[2]
F Contreras (MEX); AR Villarreal (MEX)	6	3	[10]
L Kraus (AUT); A Weiss (AUT)	2	0
5	K Morisaki (JPN); N Sato (JPN)	6	6

Quarterfinals
1	H Guo (CHN); Q Ye (CHN)	6	3	[10]
D Šumová (CZE); A Zarycká (CZE)	3	6	[6]
F Contreras (MEX); AR Villarreal (MEX)	6^{1}	5
5	K Morisaki (JPN); N Sato (JPN)	7^{7}	7

Semifinals
1	H Guo (CHN); Q Ye (CHN)	7^{7}	6
5	K Morisaki (JPN); N Sato (JPN)	6^{3}	1

=== Bottom half ===
First round
7	A Kubareva (BLR); K Paulenka (BLR)	3	2
HA Altick (USA); S Bendetti (USA)	6	6
V Chaudhari (IND); S Tatavarthy (IND)	1	3
E Arbuthnott (GBR); H Hutchinson (GBR)	6	6
JF Nabanoba (UGA); J Nalukwago (UGA)	0	0
C Abbate (ITA); N Piludu (ITA)	6	6
Y-j Ahn (KOR); Y-w Jeong (KOR)	1	4
4	E Chong (HKG); M Ng (HKG)	6	6
6	C Jundakate (THA); T Momkoonthod (THA)	6	6
H Lokuge (SRI); M Rajendra (SRI)	0	0
A Cveticanin (AUS); K Staines (AUS)	6	6
R Gustafsson (SWE); J Herlogsson (SWE)	3	2
A Damarsari (INA); D Nur Haliza (INA)	6	6
S Alobaidan (KSA); L Ragab (KSA)	1	0

Second round
HA Altick (USA); S Bendetti (USA)	4	2
E Arbuthnott (GBR); H Hutchinson (GBR)	6	6
C Abbate (ITA); N Piludu (ITA)	2	3
4	E Chong (HKG); M Ng (HKG)	6	6
6	C Jundakate (THA); T Momkoonthod (THA)	7^{8}	2	[13]
A Cveticanin (AUS); K Staines (AUS)	6^{6}	6	[15]
A Damarsari (INA); D Nur Haliza (INA)	2	2
2	P-c Lee (TPE); Y-h Lee (TPE)	6	6

Quarterfinals
E Arbuthnott (GBR); H Hutchinson (GBR)	6^{4}	6	[7]
4	E Chong (HKG); M Ng (HKG)	7^{7}	1	[10]
A Cveticanin (AUS); K Staines (AUS)	2	2
2	P-c Lee (TPE); Y-h Lee (TPE)	6	6

Semifinals
4	E Chong (HKG); M Ng (HKG)	1	6	[3]
2	P-c Lee (TPE); Y-h Lee (TPE)	6	3	[10]
