= Tennis at the 2019 Summer Universiade – Women's singles =

Women's singles at the XXX Summer Universiade
- Venue: Circolo Tennis and Lungomare
- Dates: July 5, 2019 – July 13, 2019
- Competitors: 66 from 37 nations

Medalists
1st place, gold medalist(s)		Naho Sato	Japan
2nd place, silver medalist(s)		Emily Arbuthnott	Great Britain
3rd place, bronze medalist(s)		Eudice Chong	Hong Kong
3rd place, bronze medalist(s)		Chompoothip Jundakate	Thailand

Women's singles
- Tennis at the 2019 Summer Universiade

Events
Singles	men	women
Doubles	men	women	mixed
Team	men	women
← 2017 ·	Summer Universiade	· 2021 →

The women's singles tennis event at the 2019 Summer Universiade was held from 5 to 13 July at the Circolo Tennis and Lungomare in Naples, Italy.

Japan's Naho Sato won the gold medal, defeating Great Britain's Emily Arbuthnott in the final, 6–4, 6–4.

Hong Kong's Eudice Chong and Thailand's Chompoothip Jundakate won the bronze medals.

== Seeds ==
All seeds receive a bye into the second round.

1. Anastasia Zarycká (CZE) (fourth round)
2. Lee Ya-hsuan (TPE) (quarterfinals)
3. Victoria Kan (RUS) (quarterfinals, retired)
4. Guo Hanyu (CHN) (fourth round)
5. Yana Sizikova (RUS) (fourth round)
6. Eudice Chong (HKG) (semifinals; Bronze medalist)
7. Chompoothip Jundakate (THA) (semifinals; Bronze medalist)
8. Ye Qiuyu (CHN) (fourth round)
9. Naho Sato (JPN) (champion; gold medalist)
10. Kanako Morisaki (JPN) (quarterfinals)
11. Maggie Ng (HKG) (second round)
12. Lee Pei-chi (TPE) (third round)
13. Alice Robbe (FRA) (third round)
14. Anna Kubareva (BLR) (quarterfinals)
15. Dariya Detkovskaya (KAZ) (second round)
16. Emily Arbuthnott (GBR) (final; Silver medalist)

== Draw ==
=== Key ===
- Q = Qualifier
- WC = Wild card
- LL = Lucky loser
- Alt = Alternate
- ITF = ITF entry
- PR = Protected ranking
- SR = Special ranking
- SE = Special exempt
- JE = Junior exempt
- JR = Junior Accelerator Programme entrant
- CO = College Accelerator Programme entrant
- NG = Next Gen Accelerator Program entrant
- w/o = Walkover
- r = Retired
- d = Defaulted

=== Finals ===
Quarterfinals
14	Anna Kubareva (BLR)	6	1	3
6	Eudice Chong (HKG)	4	6	6
16	Emily Arbuthnott (GBR)	6	6
10	Kanako Morisaki (JPN)	0	2
7	Chompoothip Jundakate (THA)	6	0
3	Victoria Kan (RUS)	4	0^{r}
9	Naho Sato (JPN)	7	6
2	Lee Ya-hsuan (TPE)	5	4

Semifinals
6	Eudice Chong (HKG)	1	3
16	Emily Arbuthnott (GBR)	6	6
7	Chompoothip Jundakate (THA)	4	1
9	Naho Sato (JPN)	6	6

Final
16	Emily Arbuthnott (GBR)	4	4
9	Naho Sato (JPN)	6	6

=== Top half ===
==== Section 1 ====
First round
A Cveticanin (AUS)	4	6^{1}
AF Santos (POR)	6	7^{7}

Second round
1	A Zarycká (CZE)	6	6
AF Santos (POR)	1	3
F Contreras (MEX)	6	6
H Lokuge (SRI)	0	0
K Strešnáková (SVK)	3	6	7
L Kraus (AUT)	6	1	5
L Ragab (KSA)	0	0
14	A Kubareva (BLR)	6	6

Third round
1	A Zarycká (CZE)	7	6
F Contreras (MEX)	5	4
K Strešnáková (SVK)	4	2
14	A Kubareva (BLR)	6	6

Fourth round
1	A Zarycká (CZE)	5	3
14	A Kubareva (BLR)	7	6

==== Section 2 ====
First round

Second round
12	P-c Lee (TPE)	6	6
JF Nabanoba (UGA)	0	0
HG Dela Cruz (PHI)	0	0
M Orange (FRA)	6	6
T Ndlovu (ZIM)	0	2
A Damarsari (INA)	6	6
R Gustafsson (SWE)	0	1
6	E Chong (HKG)	6	6

Third round
12	P-c Lee (TPE)	5	6	1
M Orange (FRA)	7	3	6
A Damarsari (INA)	2	2
6	E Chong (HKG)	6	6

Fourth round
M Orange (FRA)	4	4
6	E Chong (HKG)	6	6

==== Section 3 ====
First round

Second round
4	H Guo (CHN)	6	3	6
S Tatavarthy (IND)	1	6	3
M Sakala (ZAM)	0	6	1
E Buczkó (HUN)	6	4	6
S Bendetti (USA)	5	2
P Brglez (SLO)	7	6
Z Kulambayeva (KAZ)	0	1
16	E Arbuthnott (GBR)	6	6

Third round
4	H Guo (CHN)	6	6
E Buczkó (HUN)	3	3
P Brglez (SLO)	1	1
16	E Arbuthnott (GBR)	6	6

Fourth round
4	H Guo (CHN)	4	7^{7}	6^{5}
16	E Arbuthnott (GBR)	6	6^{4}	7^{7}

==== Section 4 ====
First round

Second round
10	K Morisaki (JPN)	6	6
Y-j Ahn (KOR)	1	3
N Piludu (ITA)	7	1	6^{9}
T Momkoonthod (THA)	5	6	7^{11}
M Landmann (RSA)	6	6
HJ Raoelimalala (MAD)	2	3
L Bakhodirova (UZB)	1	2
5	Y Sizikova (RUS)	6	6

Third round
10	K Morisaki (JPN)	6	6
T Momkoonthod (THA)	4	2
M Landmann (RSA)	1	0
5	Y Sizikova (RUS)	6	6

Fourth round
10	K Morisaki (JPN)	6	3	7
5	Y Sizikova (RUS)	4	6	5

=== Bottom half ===
==== Section 5 ====
First round

Second round
7	C Jundakate (THA)	6	6
R Merlo (ARG)	1	1
N Karamoko (SUI)	7	6
KT Godec (SLO)	5	0
J Herlogsson (SWE)	2	0
Y-w Jeong (KOR)	6	6
D Nur Haliza (INA)	4	6	6
11	M Ng (HKG)	6	3	3

Third round
7	C Jundakate (THA)	6	6
N Karamoko (SUI)	1	1
Y-w Jeong (KOR)	5	6	6
D Nur Haliza (INA)	7	3	1

Fourth round
7	C Jundakate (THA)	6	6
Y-w Jeong (KOR)	4	2

==== Section 6 ====
First round

Second round
15	D Detkovskaya (KAZ)	7^{8}	3	1
D Kuczer (POL)	6^{6}	6	6
S Alobaidan (KSA)	0	0
D Šumová (CZE)	6	6
H-W van Zyl (RSA)	4	6	4
C Abbate (ITA)	6	4	6
HA Altick (USA)	1	6	3
3	V Kan (RUS)	6	3	6

Third round
D Kuczer (POL)	6	3	3
D Šumová (CZE)	1	6	6
C Abbate (ITA)	0	0
3	V Kan (RUS)	6	6

Fourth round
D Šumová (CZE)	0	1
3	V Kan (RUS)	6	6

==== Section 7 ====
First round

Second round
8	Q Ye (CHN)	6	6
J Nalukwago (UGA)	0	0
K Paulenka (BLR)	6	6
I Mesquita (POR)	1	1
K Umarova (UZB)	6	6
EL Dela Cruz (PHI)	0	0
AR Villarreal (MEX)	1	3
9	N Sato (JPN)	6	6

Third round
8	Q Ye (CHN)	1	6	6
K Paulenka (BLR)	6	1	1
K Umarova (UZB)	1	2
9	N Sato (JPN)	6	6

Fourth round
8	Q Ye (CHN)	3	3
9	N Sato (JPN)	6	6

==== Section 8 ====
First round
A Weiss (AUT)	6	6
V Koberlingová (SVK)	4	2

Second round
13	A Robbe (FRA)	7	6
V Chaudhari (IND)	5	2
K Staines (AUS)	6	6
H Hutchinson (GBR)	4	3
M Siopacha (CYP)	6	6
M Rajendra (SRI)	0	0
A Weiss (AUT)	3	6^{4}
2	Y-h Lee (TPE)	6	7^{7}

Third round
13	A Robbe (FRA)	7^{7}	2	6^{7}
K Staines (AUS)	6^{2}	6	7^{9}
M Siopacha (CYP)	1	1
2	Y-h Lee (TPE)	6	6

Fourth round
K Staines (AUS)	3	1
2	Y-h Lee (TPE)	6	6
