= Tennis at the 2019 Summer Universiade – Mixed doubles =

Mixed doubles at the XXX Summer Universiade
- Venue: Circolo Tennis and Lungomare
- Dates: July 9, 2019 – July 13, 2019
- Competitors: 62 from 31 nations
- Teams: 31

Medalists
1st place, gold medalist(s)		Yana Sizikova; Ivan Gakhov	Russia
2nd place, silver medalist(s)		Anastasia Zarycká; Dominik Kellovský	Czech Republic
3rd place, bronze medalist(s)		Ye Qiuyu; Wu Hao	China
3rd place, bronze medalist(s)		Alice Robbe; Ronan Joncour	France

Mixed doubles
- Tennis at the 2019 Summer Universiade

Events
Singles	men	women
Doubles	men	women	mixed
Team	men	women
← 2017 ·	Summer Universiade	· 2021 →

The mixed doubles tennis event at the 2019 Summer Universiade was held from 9 to 13 July at the Circolo Tennis and Lungomare in Naples, Italy.

Russia's Yana Sizikova and Ivan Gakhov won the gold medal, defeating Czech Republic's Anastasia Zarycká and Dominik Kellovský in the final, 4–6, 6–2, [10–8].

China's Ye Qiuyu and Wu Hao, and France's Alice Robbe and Ronan Joncour won the bronze medals.

== Seeds ==
The top seed received a bye into the second round.

1. Yana Sizikova / Ivan Gakhov (RUS) (champions; gold medalists)
2. Anastasia Zarycká / Dominik Kellovský (CZE) (final; Silver Medalists)
3. Lee Ya-hsuan / Wu Tung-lin (TPE) (quarterfinals)
4. Ye Qiuyu / Wu Hao (CHN) (semifinals; Bronze Medalists)
5. Dariya Detkovskaya / Timur Khabibulin (KAZ) (first round)
6. Emily Arbuthnott / Scott Duncan (GBR) (quarterfinals)
7. Anna Kubareva / Ivan Liutarevich (BLR) (second round)
8. Tamachan Momkoonthod / Palaphoom Kovapitukted (THA) (quarterfinals)

== Draw ==
=== Key ===
- Q = Qualifier
- WC = Wild card
- LL = Lucky loser
- Alt = Alternate
- ITF = ITF entry
- PR = Protected ranking
- SR = Special ranking
- SE = Special exempt
- JE = Junior exempt
- JR = Junior Accelerator Programme entrant
- CO = College Accelerator Programme entrant
- NG = Next Gen Accelerator Program entrant
- w/o = Walkover
- r = Retired
- d = Defaulted

=== Finals ===
Semifinals
1	Yana Sizikova (RUS); Ivan Gakhov (RUS)	6	2	[10]
4	Ye Qiuyu (CHN); Wu Hao (CHN)	4	6	[5]
Alice Robbe (FRA); Ronan Joncour (FRA)	6	6^{2}	[7]
2	Anastasia Zarycká (CZE); Dominik Kellovský (CZE)	3	7^{7}	[10]

Final
1	Yana Sizikova (RUS); Ivan Gakhov (RUS)	4	6	[10]
2	Anastasia Zarycká (CZE); Dominik Kellovský (CZE)	6	2	[8]

=== Top half ===
First round
H Lokuge (SRI); Y de Silva (SRI)	2	1
AR Villarreal (MEX); M Reséndiz Domínguez (MEX)	6	6
A Damarsari (INA); MR Fitriadi (INA)	6	4	[10]
AF Santos (POR); M Prata (POR)	2	6	[12]
HG Dela Cruz (PHI); A Quiza (PHI)	0	0
7	A Kubareva (BLR); I Liutarevich (BLR)	6	6
4	Q Ye (CHN); H Wu (CHN)	6	6
V Chaudhari (IND); R Rangaraju (IND)	0	2
N Sato (JPN); S Shimabukuro (JPN)	6	6
K Strešnáková (SVK); M Marko (SVK)	3	2
JF Nabanoba (UGA); JG Mugisha (UGA)	0	0
H-W van Zyl (RSA); RJ Kruger (RSA)	6	6
E Chong (HKG); AJ Tang (HKG)	3	7^{8}	[7]
6	E Arbuthnott (GBR); S Duncan (GBR)	6	6^{6}	[10]

Second round
1	Y Sizikova (RUS); I Gakhov (RUS)	6	6
AR Villarreal (MEX); M Reséndiz Domínguez (MEX)	1	2
AF Santos (POR); M Prata (POR)	3	6	[11]
7	A Kubareva (BLR); I Liutarevich (BLR)	6	3	[9]
4	Q Ye (CHN); H Wu (CHN)	7^{7}	6
N Sato (JPN); S Shimabukuro (JPN)	6^{3}	3
H-W van Zyl (RSA); RJ Kruger (RSA)	3	2
6	E Arbuthnott (GBR); S Duncan (GBR)	6	6

Quarterfinals
1	Y Sizikova (RUS); I Gakhov (RUS)	6	7
AF Santos (POR); M Prata (POR)	4	5
4	Q Ye (CHN); H Wu (CHN)	7^{8}	4	[10]
6	E Arbuthnott (GBR); S Duncan (GBR)	6^{6}	6	[3]

Semifinals
1	Y Sizikova (RUS); I Gakhov (RUS)	6	2	[10]
4	Q Ye (CHN); H Wu (CHN)	4	6	[5]

=== Bottom half ===
First round
5	D Detkovskaya (KAZ); T Khabibulin (KAZ)	6	3	[6]
A Robbe (FRA); R Joncour (FRA)	2	6	[10]
N Piludu (ITA); GM Ortenzi (ITA)	6^{1}	2
HA Altick (USA); K Smith (USA)	7^{7}	6
K Umarova (UZB); S Fayziev (UZB)	6	6
Y-w Jeong (KOR); S-c Hong (KOR)	3	4
M Sakala (ZAM); B Phiri (ZAM)	0	0
3	Y-h Lee (TPE); T-l Wu (TPE)	6	6
8	T Momkoonthod (THA); P Kovapitukted (THA)	3	6	[11]
M Siopacha (CYP); M Efstathiou (CYP)	6	3	[9]
R Merlo (ARG); L Coria (ARG)	6	3	[10]
KT Godec (SLO); T Kovačič (SLO)	2	6	[5]
D Kuczer (POL); P Matuszewski (POL)	7^{10}	7^{8}
K Staines (AUS); S Jones (AUS)	6^{8}	6^{6}
N Karamoko (SUI); L Keist (SUI)	4	1
2	A Zarycká (CZE); D Kellovský (CZE)	6	6

Second round
A Robbe (FRA); R Joncour (FRA)	w/o
HA Altick (USA); K Smith (USA)
K Umarova (UZB); S Fayziev (UZB)	4	2
3	Y-h Lee (TPE); T-l Wu (TPE)	6	6
8	T Momkoonthod (THA); P Kovapitukted (THA)	6	6
R Merlo (ARG); L Coria (ARG)	2	4
D Kuczer (POL); P Matuszewski (POL)	2	6	[6]
2	A Zarycká (CZE); D Kellovský (CZE)	6	3	[10]

Quarterfinals
A Robbe (FRA); R Joncour (FRA)	4	7^{7}	[10]
3	Y-h Lee (TPE); T-l Wu (TPE)	6	6^{2}	[2]
8	T Momkoonthod (THA); P Kovapitukted (THA)	1	3
2	A Zarycká (CZE); D Kellovský (CZE)	6	6

Semifinals
A Robbe (FRA); R Joncour (FRA)	6	6^{2}	[7]
2	A Zarycká (CZE); D Kellovský (CZE)	3	7^{7}	[10]
