= Tennis at the 2019 Summer Universiade – Women's team =

Women's team classification at the Universiade
- Venue: Circolo Tennis and Lungomare
- Dates: 5 July 2019 – 13 July 2019

Medalists
| 1st place, gold medalist(s) | | Japan (JPN) |
| 2nd place, silver medalist(s) | | China (CHN) |
| 3rd place, bronze medalist(s) | | Russia (RUS) |

Women's team
- Tennis at the 2019 Summer Universiade

Events
| Singles | men | women |
| Doubles | men | women | mixed |
| Team | men | women |
| ← 2017 · | Summer Universiade | · 2021 → |

The women's team classification tennis event at the 2019 Summer Universiade was held between 5 and 13 July 2019 at the Circolo Tennis and Lungomare in Naples, Italy.

== Ranking System ==
The chart below shows that the points earn on each ranking in each events.

| Rank | Points | |
| Rank | Singles | Doubles |
|---|---|---|
| 1st place, gold medalist(s) | 60 | |
| 2nd place, silver medalist(s) | 40 | |
| 3rd place, bronze medalist(s) | 20 | |
| 5/8 | 10 | |
| 9/16 | 5 | — |

If the results are same, the rank will be judged in the following steps:

- Medal counts
- Gold medal counts
- Best rank at the singles event.

== Results ==
=== Individual ranking ===
| Placing | WS | | WD | | XD | |
| Placing | Athlete | Points | Athlete | Points | Athlete | Points |
|---|---|---|---|---|---|---|
| 1st place, gold medalist(s) | Naho Sato (JPN) | 60 | Guo Hanyu (CHN); Ye Qiuyu (CHN) | 60 | Yana Sizikova (RUS); Ivan Gakhov (RUS) | 60 |
| 2nd place, silver medalist(s) | Emily Arbuthnott (GBR) | 40 | Lee Pei-chi (TPE); Lee Ya-hsuan (TPE) | 40 | Anastasia Zarycká (CZE); Dominik Kellovský (CZE) | 40 |
| 3rd place, bronze medalist(s) | Eudice Chong (HKG) | 20 | Kanako Morisaki (JPN); Naho Sato (JPN) | 20 | Ye Qiuyu (CHN); Wu Hao (CHN) | 20 |
| 3rd place, bronze medalist(s) | Chompoothip Jundakate (THA) | 20 | Eudice Chong (HKG); Maggie Ng (HKG) | 20 | Alice Robbe (FRA); Ronan Joncour (FRA) | 20 |
| Quarterfinals | Anna Kubareva (BLR) | 10 | Diana Šumová (CZE); Anastasia Zarycká (CZE) | 10 | Ana Filipa Santos (POR); Martim Prata (POR) | 10 |
| Quarterfinals | Kanako Morisaki (JPN) | 10 | Fernanda Contreras (MEX); Andrea Renée Villarreal (MEX) | 10 | Emily Arbuthnott (GBR); Scott Duncan (GBR) | 10 |
| Quarterfinals | Victoria Kan (RUS) | 10 | Emily Arbuthnott (GBR); Holly Hutchinson (GBR) | 10 | Lee Ya-hsuan (TPE); Wu Tung-lin (TPE) | 10 |
| Quarterfinals | Lee Ya-hsuan (TPE) | 10 | Aleksa Cveticanin (AUS); Kaitlin Staines (AUS) | 10 | Tamachan Momkoonthod (THA); Palaphoom Kovapitukted (THA) | 10 |
| Fourth round | Anastasia Zarycká (CZE) | 5 | — | | | |
| Fourth round | Margaux Orange (FRA) | 5 | — | | | |
| Fourth round | Guo Hanyu (CHN) | 5 | — | | | |
| Fourth round | Yana Sizikova (RUS) | 5 | — | | | |
| Fourth round | Jeong Yeong-won (KOR) | 5 | — | | | |
| Fourth round | Diana Šumová (CZE) | 5 | — | | | |
| Fourth round | Ye Qiuyu (CHN) | 5 | — | | | |
| Fourth round | Kaitlin Staines (AUS) | 5 | — | | | |

=== Nation ranking ===
| Rank | Team | Points | | | Total |
| Rank | Team | WS | WD | XD | Total |
|---|---|---|---|---|---|
| 1st place, gold medalist(s) | Japan (JPN) | 70 | 20 | 0 | 90 |
| 2nd place, silver medalist(s) | China (CHN) | 10 | 60 | 20 | 90 |
| 3rd place, bronze medalist(s) | Russia (RUS) | 15 | 0 | 60 | 75 |
| 4 | Great Britain (GBR) | 40 | 10 | 10 | 60 |
| 4 | Chinese Taipei (TPE) | 10 | 40 | 10 | 60 |
| 4 | Czech Republic (CZE) | 10 | 10 | 40 | 60 |
| 7 | Hong Kong (HKG) | 20 | 20 | 0 | 40 |
| 8 | Thailand (THA) | 20 | 0 | 10 | 30 |
| 9 | France (FRA) | 5 | 0 | 20 | 25 |
| 10 | Australia (AUS) | 5 | 10 | 0 | 15 |
| 11 | Belarus (BLR) | 10 | 0 | 0 | 10 |
| 12 | Mexico (MEX) | 0 | 10 | 0 | 10 |
| 13 | Portugal (POR) | 0 | 0 | 10 | 10 |
| 14 | South Korea (KOR) | 5 | 0 | 0 | 5 |
