= Tennis at the 2019 Summer Universiade – Men's team =

Men's team classification at the Universiade
- Venue: Circolo Tennis and Lungomare
- Dates: 5 July 2019– 13 July 2019

Medalists
1st place, gold medalist(s)		Uzbekistan (UZB)
2nd place, silver medalist(s)		Russia (RUS)
3rd place, bronze medalist(s)		Chinese Taipei (TPE)

Men's team
- Tennis at the 2019 Summer Universiade

Events
Singles	men	women
Doubles	men	women	mixed
Team	men	women
← 2017 ·	Summer Universiade	· 2021 →

The men's team classification tennis event at the 2019 Summer Universiade was held between 5 and 13 July 2019 at the Circolo Tennis and Lungomare in Naples, Italy.

== Ranking system ==
The following chart shows the points earned on each ranking in each event.

Rank	Points	
Rank	Singles	Doubles
1st place, gold medalist(s)	60	
2nd place, silver medalist(s)	40	
3rd place, bronze medalist(s)	20	
5/8	10	
9/16	5	—

If the results are same, the rank will be judged in the following steps:

- Medal counts
- Gold medal counts
- Best rank at the singles event.

== Results ==
=== Individual ranking ===
Placing	MS		MD		XD	
Placing	Athlete	Points	Athlete	Points	Athlete	Points
1st place, gold medalist(s)	Tseng Chun-hsin (TPE)	60	Sanjar Fayziev (UZB); Khumoyun Sultanov (UZB)	60	Yana Sizikova (RUS); Ivan Gakhov (RUS)	60
2nd place, silver medalist(s)	Khumoyun Sultanov (UZB)	40	Hong Seong-chan (KOR); Shin San-hui (KOR)	40	Anastasia Zarycká (CZE); Dominik Kellovský (CZE)	40
3rd place, bronze medalist(s)	Lucas Poullain (FRA)	20	Yuya Ito (JPN); Sho Shimabukuro (JPN)	20	Ye Qiuyu (CHN); Wu Hao (CHN)	20
3rd place, bronze medalist(s)	Ivan Gakhov (RUS)	20	Wu Hao (CHN); Xu Shuai (CHN)	20	Alice Robbe (FRA); Ronan Joncour (FRA)	20
Quarterfinals	Wu Tung-lin (TPE)	10	Timur Khabibulin (KAZ); Grigoriy Lomakin (KAZ)	10	Ana Filipa Santos (POR); Martim Prata (POR)	10
Quarterfinals	Keegan Smith (USA)	10	Ronan Joncour (FRA); Lucas Poullain (FRA)	10	Emily Arbuthnott (GBR); Scott Duncan (GBR)	10
Quarterfinals	Christoph Negritu (GER)	10	Ivan Gakhov (RUS); Timur Kiyamov (RUS)	10	Lee Ya-hsuan (TPE); Wu Tung-lin (TPE)	10
Quarterfinals	Sanjar Fayziev (UZB)	10	Tseng Chun-hsin (TPE); Wu Tung-lin (TPE)	10	Tamachan Momkoonthod (THA); Palaphoom Kovapitukted (THA)	10
Fourth round	Shin San-hui (KOR)	5	—			
Fourth round	Yuya Ito (JPN)	5	—			
Fourth round	Menelaos Efstathiou (CYP)	5	—			
Fourth round	Anthony Jackie Tang (HKG)	5	—			
Fourth round	Ryan Peniston (GBR)	5	—			
Fourth round	Ronan Joncour (FRA)	5	—			
Fourth round	Hong Seong-chan (KOR)	5	—			
Fourth round	Sho Shimabukuro (JPN)	5	—			

=== Nation ranking ===
Rank	Team	Points			Total
Rank	Team	MS	MD	XD	Total
1st place, gold medalist(s)	Uzbekistan (UZB)	50	60	0	110
2nd place, silver medalist(s)	Russia (RUS)	20	10	60	90
3rd place, bronze medalist(s)	Chinese Taipei (TPE)	70	10	10	90
4	France (FRA)	25	10	20	55
5	South Korea (KOR)	10	40	0	50
6	China (CHN)	0	20	20	40
7	Czech Republic (CZE)	0	0	40	40
8	Japan (JPN)	10	20	0	30
9	Great Britain (GBR)	5	0	10	15
10	Germany (GER)	10	0	0	10
10	United States (USA)	10	0	0	10
10	Kazakhstan (KAZ)	0	10	0	10
10	Portugal (POR)	0	0	10	10
10	Thailand (THA)	0	0	10	10
15	Cyprus (CYP)	5	0	0	5
15	Hong Kong (HKG)	5	0	0	5
