= Tennis at the 2019 Summer Universiade – Men's singles =

Men's singles at the XXX Summer Universiade
- Venue: Circolo Tennis and Lungomare
- Dates: July 5, 2019 – July 13, 2019
- Competitors: 71 from 40 nations

Medalists
1st place, gold medalist(s)		Tseng Chun-hsin	Chinese Taipei
2nd place, silver medalist(s)		Khumoyun Sultanov	Uzbekistan
3rd place, bronze medalist(s)		Lucas Poullain	France
3rd place, bronze medalist(s)		Ivan Gakhov	Russia

Men's singles
- Tennis at the 2019 Summer Universiade

Events
Singles	men	women
Doubles	men	women	mixed
Team	men	women
← 2017 ·	Summer Universiade	· 2021 →

The men's singles tennis event at the 2019 Summer Universiade was held from 5 to 13 July at the Circolo Tennis and Lungomare in Naples, Italy.

Chinese Taipei's Tseng Chun-hsin won the gold medal, defeating Uzbekistan's Khumoyun Sultanov in the final, 6–7^{(4–7)}, 6–3, 6–1.

France's Lucas Poullain and Russia's Ivan Gakhov won the bronze medals.

== Seeds ==
All seeds receive a bye into the second round.

1. Wu Tung-lin (TPE) (quarterfinals)
2. Ivan Gakhov (RUS) (semifinals; Bronze Medalist)
3. Khumoyun Sultanov (UZB) (final; Silver Medalist)
4. Tseng Chun-hsin (TPE) (champion; gold medalist)
5. Sanjar Fayziev (UZB) (quarterfinals)
6. Ryan Peniston (GBR) (fourth round)
7. Christian Seraphim (GER) (second round)
8. Matěj Vocel (CZE) (third round)
9. Hong Seong-chan (KOR) (fourth round)
10. Christoph Negritu (GER) (quarterfinals)
11. Vladyslav Orlov (UKR) (second round)
12. Sho Shimabukuro (JPN) (fourth round)
13. Ronan Joncour (FRA) (fourth round)
14. Lucas Poullain (FRA) (semifinals; Bronze Medalist)
15. Wu Hao (CHN) (third round)
16. Shin San-hui (KOR) (fourth round)

== Draw ==
=== Key ===
- Q = Qualifier
- WC = Wild card
- LL = Lucky loser
- Alt = Alternate
- ITF = ITF entry
- PR = Protected ranking
- SR = Special ranking
- SE = Special exempt
- JE = Junior exempt
- JR = Junior Accelerator Programme entrant
- CO = College Accelerator Programme entrant
- NG = Next Gen Accelerator Program entrant
- w/o = Walkover
- r = Retired
- d = Defaulted

=== Finals ===
Quarterfinals
1	Wu Tung-lin (TPE)	6^{3}	2
14	Lucas Poullain (FRA)	7^{7}	6
3	Khumoyun Sultanov (UZB)	6	6
Keegan Smith (USA)	1	2
10	Christoph Negritu (GER)	1	4
4	Tseng Chun-hsin (TPE)	6	6
5	Sanjar Fayziev (UZB)	4	6^{4}
2	Ivan Gakhov (RUS)	6	7^{7}

Semifinals
14	Lucas Poullain (FRA)	0	3
3	Khumoyun Sultanov (UZB)	6	6
4	Tseng Chun-hsin (TPE)	6	6
2	Ivan Gakhov (RUS)	0	1

Final
3	Khumoyun Sultanov (UZB)	7^{7}	3	1
4	Tseng Chun-hsin (TPE)	6^{4}	6	6

=== Top half ===
==== Section 1 ====
First round
S Duncan (GBR)	6	6
J Gammad (PHI)	0	0

Second round
1	T-l Wu (TPE)	6	6
S Duncan (GBR)	3	1
K Pearson (AUS)	6	6
C Meier (LIE)	1	0
L Coria (ARG)	1	3
T Pavlovský (SVK)	6	6
N Sitar (SLO)	2	2
16	S-h Shin (KOR)	6	6

Third round
1	T-l Wu (TPE)	6	6
K Pearson (AUS)	2	1
T Pavlovský (SVK)	2	0
16	S-h Shin (KOR)	6	6

Fourth round
1	T-l Wu (TPE)	6	7
16	S-h Shin (KOR)	4	5

==== Section 2 ====
First round

Second round
14	L Poullain (FRA)	7^{7}	6
P Matuszewski (POL)	6^{4}	4
A Ceppellini (ITA)	6	6
A Mostafa Mouhan (LBA)	3	0
PC Mutumba (UGA)	0	0
Y Ito (JPN)	6	6
T Kiyamov (RUS)	5	2
8	M Vocel (CZE)	7	6

Third round
14	L Poullain (FRA)	6	6
A Ceppellini (ITA)	1	2
Y Ito (JPN)	3	6	6
8	M Vocel (CZE)	6	3	2

Fourth round
14	L Poullain (FRA)	6	6
Y Ito (JPN)	2	2

==== Section 3 ====
First round
M Alazaam (KSA)	0	1
Y de Silva (SRI)	6	6

Second round
3	K Sultanov (UZB)	6	6
Y de Silva (SRI)	0	0
T Sutris (LAT)	0	0
D Rodrigues (POR)	6	6
M Reséndiz Domínguez (MEX)	6^{4}	0
M Efstathiou (CYP)	7^{7}	6
IA Susanto (INA)	3	6	1
15	H Wu (CHN)	6	4	6

Third round
3	K Sultanov (UZB)	6	6
D Rodrigues (POR)	1	0
M Efstathiou (CYP)	6	6
15	H Wu (CHN)	4	1

Fourth round
3	K Sultanov (UZB)	7	6
M Efstathiou (CYP)	5	2

==== Section 4 ====
First round
R Rangaraju (IND)	4	4
I Liutarevich (BLR)	6	6

Second round
11	V Orlov (UKR)	1	6	3
K Smith (USA)	6	3	6
P Kovapitukted (THA)	6^{3}	2
G Lomakin (KAZ)	7^{7}	6
AJ Tang (HKG)	6	6
RJ Kruger (RSA)	0	0
I Liutarevich (BLR)	6	4	7
7	C Seraphim (GER)	4	6	5

Third round
K Smith (USA)	6	6
G Lomakin (KAZ)	1	4
AJ Tang (HKG)	6	4	7
I Liutarevich (BLR)	4	6	5

Fourth round
K Smith (USA)	6	6
AJ Tang (HKG)	2	3

=== Bottom half ===
==== Section 5 ====
First round
T Kovačič (SLO)	6	6
B Phiri (ZAM)	0	1

Second round
6	R Peniston (GBR)	6	6
T Kovačič (SLO)	4	1
KP Koralage (SRI)	0	1
D Glinka (EST)	6	6
D Kellovský (CZE)	7	6
O Sadler (NZL)	5	2
I Ortega Enríquez (ARG)	3	0
10	C Negritu (GER)	6	6

Third round
6	R Peniston (GBR)	6	6
D Glinka (EST)	2	1
D Kellovský (CZE)	3	6^{4}
10	C Negritu (GER)	6	7^{7}

Fourth round
6	R Peniston (GBR)	2	4
10	C Negritu (GER)	6	6

==== Section 6 ====
First round
L Keist (SUI)	5	1
D Nazaruk (POL)	7	6

Second round
13	R Joncour (FRA)	6	6
A Quiza (PHI)	0	0
T Khabibulin (KAZ)	6	6
T Enkhzaya (MGL)	1	0
S Xu (CHN)	6	7
R Forster (LIE)	1	5
D Nazaruk (POL)	6^{4}	0
4	C-h Tseng (TPE)	7^{7}	6

Third round
13	R Joncour (FRA)	6	6
T Khabibulin (KAZ)	3	1
S Xu (CHN)	0	0
4	C-h Tseng (TPE)	6	6

Fourth round
13	R Joncour (FRA)	1	7^{7}	1
4	C-h Tseng (TPE)	6	6^{3}	6

==== Section 7 ====
First round
KJ Carpenter (MEX)	6	6
H Willemse (RSA)	4	2

Second round
5	S Fayziev (UZB)	6	6
KJ Carpenter (MEX)	2	1
N Kunsuwan (THA)	6	2	6
A Liaonenka (BLR)	1	6	4
MR Fitriadi (INA)	6	6
A Alazzam (KSA)	0	1
S Ponnala (IND)	1	1
9	S-c Hong (KOR)	6	6

Third round
5	S Fayziev (UZB)	6	6
N Kunsuwan (THA)	3	2
MR Fitriadi (INA)	3	3
9	S-c Hong (KOR)	6	6

Fourth round
5	S Fayziev (UZB)	6^{7}	7^{8}	6
9	S-c Hong (KOR)	7^{9}	6^{6}	1

==== Section 8 ====
First round
GM Ortenzi (ITA)	4	7	6
M Marko (SVK)	6	5	1

Second round
12	S Shimabukuro (JPN)	6	6
S Jones (AUS)	1	1
C Lam (HKG)	6	6
JG Mugisha (UGA)	0	0
M Prata (POR)	6	6
M Muraviov (UKR)	3	3
GM Ortenzi (ITA)	6	3	3
2	I Gakhov (RUS)	3	6	6

Third round
12	S Shimabukuro (JPN)	6	6
C Lam (HKG)	2	4
M Prata (POR)	4	6^{5}
2	I Gakhov (RUS)	6	7^{7}

Fourth round
12	S Shimabukuro (JPN)	3	6	0
2	I Gakhov (RUS)	6	3	6
