= Tennis at the 2019 Summer Universiade – Men's doubles =

Men's doubles at the XXX Summer Universiade
- Venue: Circolo Tennis and Lungomare
- Dates: July 6, 2019 – July 12, 2019
- Competitors: 62 from 31 nations
- Teams: 31

Medalists
1st place, gold medalist(s)		Sanjar Fayziev; Khumoyun Sultanov	Uzbekistan
2nd place, silver medalist(s)		Hong Seong-chan; Shin San-hui	South Korea
3rd place, bronze medalist(s)		Yuya Ito; Sho Shimabukuro	Japan
3rd place, bronze medalist(s)		Wu Hao; Xu Shuai	China

Men's doubles
- Tennis at the 2019 Summer Universiade

Events
Singles	men	women
Doubles	men	women	mixed
Team	men	women
← 2017 ·	Summer Universiade	· 2021 →

The men's doubles tennis event at the 2019 Summer Universiade was held from 6 to 12 July at the Circolo Tennis and Lungomare in Naples, Italy.

Uzbekistan's Sanjar Fayziev and Khumoyun Sultanov won the gold medals, defeating South Korea's Hong Seong-chan and Shin San-hui in the final, 7–5, 4–6, [10–5].

Japan's Yuya Ito and Sho Shimabukuro, and China's Wu Hao and Xu Shuai won the bronze medals.

== Seeds ==
The top seed received a bye into the second round.

1. Timur Khabibulin / Grigoriy Lomakin (KAZ) (quarterfinals)
2. Sanjar Fayziev / Khumoyun Sultanov (UZB) (champions; gold medalist)
3. Dominik Kellovský / Matěj Vocel (CZE) (second round)
4. Scott Duncan / Ryan Peniston (GBR) (second round)
5. Ivan Gakhov / Timur Kiyamov (RUS) (quarterfinals)
6. Christoph Negritu / Christian Seraphim (GER) (second round)
7. Tseng Chun-hsin / Wu Tung-lin (TPE) (quarterfinals)
8. Ronan Joncour / Lucas Poullain (FRA) (quarterfinals)

== Draw ==
=== Key ===
- Q = Qualifier
- WC = Wild card
- LL = Lucky loser
- Alt = Alternate
- ITF = ITF entry
- PR = Protected ranking
- SR = Special ranking
- SE = Special exempt
- JE = Junior exempt
- JR = Junior Accelerator Programme entrant
- CO = College Accelerator Programme entrant
- NG = Next Gen Accelerator Program entrant
- w/o = Walkover
- r = Retired
- d = Defaulted

=== Finals ===
Semifinals
Yuya Ito (JPN); Sho Shimabukuro (JPN)	4	2
Hong Seong-chan (KOR); Shin San-hui (KOR)	6	6
Wu Hao (CHN); Xu Shuai (CHN)	6^{5}	2
2	Sanjar Fayziev (UZB); Khumoyun Sultanov (UZB)	7^{7}	6

Final
Hong Seong-chan (KOR); Shin San-hui (KOR)	5	6	[5]
2	Sanjar Fayziev (UZB); Khumoyun Sultanov (UZB)	7	4	[10]

=== Top half ===
First round
A Liaonenka (BLR); I Liutarevich (BLR)	6	6
Y de Silva (SRI); K Diluka (SRI)	2	0
Y Ito (JPN); S Shimabukuro (JPN)	6	6
J Gammad (PHI); A Quiza (PHI)	0	0
L Coria (ARG); I Ortega Enríquez (ARG)	5	2
6	C Negritu (GER); C Seraphim (GER)	7	6
3	D Kellovský (CZE); M Vocel (CZE)	6	6
JG Mugisha (UGA); PC Mutumba (UGA)	0	0
S-c Hong (KOR); S-h Shin (KOR)	6	7^{7}
KJ Carpenter (MEX); M Reséndiz Domínguez (MEX)	3	6^{5}
R Forster (LIE); C Meier (LIE)	1	2
C Lam (HKG); AJ Tang (HKG)	6	6
P Matuszewski (POL); D Nazaruk (POL)	3	2
8	R Joncour (FRA); L Poullain (FRA)	6	6

Second round
1	T Khabibulin (KAZ); G Lomakin (KAZ)	6	4	[15]
A Liaonenka (BLR); I Liutarevich (BLR)	2	6	[13]
Y Ito (JPN); S Shimabukuro (JPN)	6	6
6	C Negritu (GER); C Seraphim (GER)	1	4
3	D Kellovský (CZE); M Vocel (CZE)	6	3	[11]
S-c Hong (KOR); S-h Shin (KOR)	3	6	[13]
C Lam (HKG); AJ Tang (HKG)	4	5
8	R Joncour (FRA); L Poullain (FRA)	6	7

Quarterfinals
1	T Khabibulin (KAZ); G Lomakin (KAZ)	5	2
Y Ito (JPN); S Shimabukuro (JPN)	7	6
S-c Hong (KOR); S-h Shin (KOR)	6	7^{7}
8	R Joncour (FRA); L Poullain (FRA)	3	6^{3}

Semifinals
Y Ito (JPN); S Shimabukuro (JPN)	4	2
S-c Hong (KOR); S-h Shin (KOR)	6	6

=== Bottom half ===
First round
5	I Gakhov (RUS); T Kiyamov (RUS)	6	6
M Muraviov (UKR); V Orlov (UKR)	3	3
MR Fitriadi (INA); IA Susanto (INA)	6	6
A Alazzam (KSA); M Alazzam (KSA)	1	0
H Wu (CHN); S Xu (CHN)	6	6
T Kovačič (SLO); N Sitar (SLO)	2	1
S Jones (AUS); K Pearson (AUS)	2	6	[5]
4	S Duncan (GBR); R Peniston (GBR)	6	4	[10]
7	C-h Tseng (TPE); T-l Wu (TPE)	6	6
A Ceppellini (ITA); GM Ortenzi (ITA)	3	4
M Prata (POR); D Rodrigues (POR)	6	0	[10]
M Marko (SVK); T Pavlovský (SVK)	4	6	[5]
RJ Kruger (RSA); H Willemse (RSA)	6	6
S Ponnala (IND); R Rangaraju (IND)	4	1
P Kovapitukted (THA); N Kunsuwan (THA)	4	4
2	S Fayziev (UZB); K Sultanov (UZB)	6	6

Second round
5	I Gakhov (RUS); T Kiyamov (RUS)	6	6
MR Fitriadi (INA); IA Susanto (INA)	1	4
H Wu (CHN); S Xu (CHN)	3	7^{8}	[10]
4	S Duncan (GBR); R Peniston (GBR)	6	6^{6}	[7]
7	C-h Tseng (TPE); T-l Wu (TPE)	7	6
M Prata (POR); D Rodrigues (POR)	5	3
RJ Kruger (RSA); H Willemse (RSA)	2	2
2	S Fayziev (UZB); K Sultanov (UZB)	6	6

Quarterfinals
5	I Gakhov (RUS); T Kiyamov (RUS)	6^{2}	3
H Wu (CHN); S Xu (CHN)	7^{7}	6
7	C-h Tseng (TPE); T-l Wu (TPE)	4	4
2	S Fayziev (UZB); K Sultanov (UZB)	6	6

Semifinals
H Wu (CHN); S Xu (CHN)	6^{5}	2
2	S Fayziev (UZB); K Sultanov (UZB)	7^{7}	6
