= Tennis at the 2019 Summer Universiade =

- Date: 5–13 July
- Edition: 19th
- Location: Circolo Tennis and Lungomare, Naples, Italy

Champions

Men's singles
- Tseng Chun-hsin (TPE)

Women's singles
- Naho Sato (JPN)

Men's doubles
- Sanjar Fayziev / Khumoyun Sultanov (UZB)

Women's doubles
- Guo Hanyu / Ye Qiuyu (CHN)

Mixed doubles
- Yana Sizikova / Ivan Gakhov (RUS)

Men's team
- Uzbekistan (UZB)

Women's team
- Japan (JPN) / China (CHN)
← 2017 ·	Summer Universiade	· 2021 →

Tennis was contested at the 2019 Summer Universiade from 5 to 13 July at the Circolo Tennis and Lungomare in Naples, Italy.

== Participating nations ==
A total of 138 athletes from 44 nations competed in tennis at the 2019 Summer Universiade:

- Argentina (3)
- Australia (4)
- Austria (2)
- Belarus (4)
- China (4)
- Chinese Taipei (4)
- Cyprus (2)
- Czech Republic (4)
- Estonia (1)
- France (4)
- Great Britain (4)
- Germany (2)
- Hong Kong (4)
- Hungary (1)
- India (4)
- Indonesia (4)
- Italy (4)
- Japan (4)
- Kazakhstan (4)
- Latvia (1)
- Libya (1)
- Liechtenstein (2)
- Madagascar (1)
- Mexico (4)
- Mongolia (1)
- New Zealand (1)
- Philippines (4)
- Poland (3)
- Portugal (4)
- Russia (4)
- Saudi Arabia (4)
- Slovakia (4)
- Slovenia (4)
- South Africa (4)
- South Korea (4)
- Sri Lanka (5)
- Sweden (2)
- Switzerland (2)
- Thailand (4)
- Uganda (4)
- Ukraine (2)
- United States (3)
- Uzbekistan (4)
- Zambia (2)
- Zimbabwe (1)

== Medal summary ==
=== Medal table ===
Host nation

Rank	Nation	Gold	Silver	Bronze	Total
1	Uzbekistan (UZB)	2	1	0	3
2	Japan (JPN)	2	0	2	4
3	China (CHN)	1	1	2	4
3	Russia (RUS)	1	1	2	4
5	Chinese Taipei (TPE)	1	1	1	3
6	Czech Republic (CZE)	0	1	0	1
6	Great Britain (GBR)	0	1	0	1
6	South Korea (KOR)	0	1	0	1
9	France (FRA)	0	0	2	2
9	Hong Kong (HKG)	0	0	2	2
11	Thailand (THA)	0	0	1	1
Totals (11 entries)		7	7	12	26

=== Events ===
Event	Gold	Silver	Bronze
Men's singles	Tseng Chun-hsin; Chinese Taipei	Khumoyun Sultanov; Uzbekistan	Lucas Poullain; France
Men's singles	Tseng Chun-hsin; Chinese Taipei	Khumoyun Sultanov; Uzbekistan	Ivan Gakhov; Russia
Women's singles	Naho Sato; Japan	Emily Arbuthnott; Great Britain	Eudice Chong; Hong Kong
Women's singles	Naho Sato; Japan	Emily Arbuthnott; Great Britain	Chompoothip Jundakate; Thailand
Men's doubles	Uzbekistan (UZB); Sanjar Fayziev; Khumoyun Sultanov	South Korea (KOR); Hong Seong-chan; Shin San-hui	Japan (JPN); Yuya Ito; Sho Shimabukuro
Men's doubles	Uzbekistan (UZB); Sanjar Fayziev; Khumoyun Sultanov	South Korea (KOR); Hong Seong-chan; Shin San-hui	China (CHN); Wu Hao; Xu Shuai
Women's doubles	China (CHN); Guo Hanyu; Ye Qiuyu	Chinese Taipei (TPE); Lee Pei-chi; Lee Ya-hsuan	Japan (JPN); Kanako Morisaki; Naho Sato
Women's doubles	China (CHN); Guo Hanyu; Ye Qiuyu	Chinese Taipei (TPE); Lee Pei-chi; Lee Ya-hsuan	Hong Kong (HKG); Eudice Chong; Maggie Ng
Mixed doubles	Russia (RUS); Yana Sizikova; Ivan Gakhov	Czech Republic (CZE); Anastasia Zarycká; Dominik Kellovský	China (CHN); Ye Qiuyu; Wu Hao
Mixed doubles	Russia (RUS); Yana Sizikova; Ivan Gakhov	Czech Republic (CZE); Anastasia Zarycká; Dominik Kellovský	France (FRA); Alice Robbe; Ronan Joncour
Men's team classification	Uzbekistan (UZB); Sanjar Fayziev; Khumoyun Sultanov	Russia (RUS); Ivan Gakhov; Timur Kiyamov	Chinese Taipei (TPE); Tseng Chun-hsin; Wu Tung-lin
Women's team classification	Japan (JPN); Kanako Morisaki; Naho Sato	—	Russia (RUS); Victoria Kan; Yana Sizikova
Women's team classification	China (CHN); Guo Hanyu; Ye Qiuyu	—	Russia (RUS); Victoria Kan; Yana Sizikova

== See also ==
- Tennis at the Summer Universiade
