= Japan at the 2019 Summer Universiade =

- IOC code: JPN
- NOC: Japanese Olympic Committee
- Website: www.joc.or.jp (in Japanese and English)

in Naples, Italy 3 July - 14 July
- Medals Ranked 1st: Gold 33 Silver 21 Bronze 28 Total 82

Summer Universiade appearances (overview)
- 1959; 1961; 1963; 1965; 1967; 1970; 1973; 1975; 1977; 1979; 1981; 1983; 1985; 1987; 1989; 1991; 1993; 1995; 1997; 1999; 2001; 2003; 2005; 2007; 2009; 2011; 2013; 2015; 2017; 2019; 2021; 2025; 2027

Japan competed at the 2019 Summer Universiade in Naples, Italy from 3 to 14 July 2019. This was the nation's 18th appearance at the Summer Universiade since making its debut at the 1985 edition. Japan finished the multi sport event at the top of the medal tally with 82 medals in 11 different sporting events.

== Medal summary ==
=== Medal by sports ===
Medals by sport
Sport	1st place, gold medalist(s)	2nd place, silver medalist(s)	3rd place, bronze medalist(s)	Total
Fencing	0	0	1	1
Athletics	8	6	5	19
Rugby sevens	2	0	0	2
Swimming	6	7	7	20
Gymnastics	7	2	6	15
Volleyball	0	0	1	1
Archery	0	1	1	2
Judo	7	3	1	11
Table tennis	0	1	4	5
Tennis	2	0	2	4
Football	1	1	0	2
Total	33	21	28	82

=== Medalists ===
Medal	Name	Sport	Event	Date
Gold	Keisuke Yoshida	Swimming	Men's 400 m freestyle	4 July
Gold	Kazuma Kaya; Kakeru Tanigawa; Wataru Tanigawa	Gymnastics	Men's artistic team all-around	4 July
Gold	Shiho Tanaka	Judo	Women's –70 kg	4 July
Gold	Hitomi Hatakeda; Aiko Sugihara; Asuka Teramoto	Gymnastics	Women's artistic team all-around	5 July
Gold	Hikaru Tomokiyo	Judo	Men's -81 kg	5 July
Gold	Kana Tomizawa	Judo	Women's -57 kg	5 July
Gold	Nana Kota	Judo	Women's -63 kg	5 July
Gold	Juran Mizohata	Swimming	Men's 200 m individual medley	6 July
Gold	Kazuma Kaya	Gymnastics	Men's individual all-around	6 July
Gold	Hitomi Hatakeda	Gymnastics	Women's individual all-around	6 July
Gold	Ryūko Takeda	Judo	Women's -52 kg	6 July
Gold	Maya Akiba	Judo	Women's open weight	6 July
Gold	Waka Kobori	Swimming	Women's 1500 m freestyle	7 July
Gold	Kakeru Tanigawa	Gymnastics	Men's parallel bars	7 July
Gold	Hitomi Hatakeda	Gymnastics	Women's uneven bars	7 July
Gold	Hitomi Hatakeda	Gymnastics	Women's balance beam	7 July
Gold	Maya Akiba; Nana Kota; Ryūko Takeda; Shiho Tanaka; Kana Tomizawa	Judo	Women's team	7 July
Gold	Shinnosuke Ishikawa	Swimming	Women's 100 m butterfly	9 July
Gold	Waka Kobori	Swimming	Women's 800 m freestyle	9 July
Gold	Yuki Ikari	Swimming	Men's 400 m individual medley	10 July
Gold	Koki Ikeda	Athletics	Men's 20 km walk	12 July
Gold	Koki Ikeda; Masatora Kawano; Yuta Koga	Athletics	Men's 20 km walk team	12 July
Gold	Daisuke Miyamoto; Yoshihiro Someya; Jun Yamashita; Bruno Dede	Athletics	Men's 4 × 100 m relay	13 July
Gold	Akira Aizawa	Athletics	Men's half marathon	13 July
Gold	Akira Aizawa; Taisei Nakamura; Tatsuhiko Ito	Athletics	Men's half marathon team	13 July
Gold	Yuka Suzuki	Athletics	Women's half marathon	13 July
Gold	Yuka Suzuki; Rika Kaseda; Yuki Tagawa	Athletics	Women's half marathon team	13 July
Gold	Yuki Hashioka	Athletics	Men's long jump	13 July
Gold	Naho Sato	Tennis	Women's singles	13 July
Gold	Kanako Morisaki; Naho Sato	Tennis	Women's team classification	13 July
Silver	Mayuka Yamamoto; Sachi Mochida; Kanako Watanabe; Runa Imai; Aki Nishizu	Swimming	Women's 4 x 100 m freestyle relay	4 July
Silver	Kanta Nakano	Judo	Men's +90 kg	4 July
Silver	Maya Akiba	Judo	Women's +78 kg	4 July
Silver	Yuya Tanaka	Swimming	Men's 50 m butterfly	5 July
Silver	Ai Soma	Swimming	Women's 50 m butterfly	5 July
Silver	Mai Fukasawa	Swimming	Women's 100 m breaststroke	6 July
Silver	Ranto Katsura	Judo	Men's -66 kg	6 July
Silver	Nao Horomura	Swimming	Men's 200 m butterfly	7 July
Silver	Kazuma Kaya	Gymnastics	Men's floor	7 July
Silver	Aiko Sugihara	Gymnastics	Women's floor	7 July
Silver	Minami Ando; Hatsune Maetaki; Asuka Sasao; Saki Seyama	Table tennis	Women's team	7 July
Silver	Rino Goshima	Athletics	Women's 10,000 m	8 July
Silver	Hiroki Abe	Athletics	Men's 10,000 m	9 July
Silver	Kosuke Matsui	Swimming	Men's 50 m freestyle	10 July
Silver	Marina Furubayashi; Mai Fukasawa; Ai Soma; Runa Imai; Kanako Watanabe	Swimming	Women's 4 x 100 m medley relay	10 July
Silver	Haruka Kitaguchi	Athletics	Women's javelin throw	10 July
Silver	Masatora Kawano	Athletics	Men's 20 km walk	12 July
Silver	Taisei Nakamura	Athletics	Men's half marathon	13 July
Silver	Rika Kaseda	Athletics	Women's half marathon	13 July
Silver	Risa Horiguchi; Yuta Ishii	Archery	Mixed team recurve	13 July
Bronze	Yuya Hinomoto	Swimming	Men's 100 m breaststroke	5 July
Bronze	Kanako Watanabe	Swimming	Women's 100 m breaststroke	6 July
Bronze	Yuto Ueno	Fencing	Men's individual foil	6 July
Bronze	Kanako Watanabe	Swimming	Women's 200 m breaststroke	6 July
Bronze	Yusuke Sadamatsu; Yuma Tsuboi; Fumiya Igarashi; Asuka Sakai	Table tennis	Men's team	6 July
Bronze	Takumi Terada	Swimming	Men's 200 m butterfly	7 July
Bronze	Runa Imai	Swimming	Women's 200 m individual medley	7 July
Bronze	Kakeru Tanigawa	Gymnastics	Men's floor	7 July
Bronze	Kazuma Kaya	Gymnastics	Men's pommel horse	7 July
Bronze	Asuka Teramoto	Gymnastics	Women's uneven bars	7 July
Bronze	Hideyuki Ishigooka; Ranto Katsura; Kanta Nakano; Goki Tajima; Hikaru Tomokiyo	Judo	Men's team	7 July
Bronze	Natsuki Sekiya	Athletics	Women's 10,000 m	8 July
Bronze	Chinatsu Sato	Swimming	Women's 800 m freestyle	9 July
Bronze	Sachi Mochida	Swimming	Women's 200 m butterfly	10 July
Bronze	Yusuke Sadamatsu; Yuma Tsuboi	Table tennis	Men's doubles	10 July
Bronze	Fumiya Igarashi; Asuka Sakai	Table tennis	Men's doubles	10 July
Bronze	Asuka Sasao; Minami Ando	Table tennis	Women's doubles	10 July
Bronze	Yuya Ito; Sho Shimabukuro	Tennis	Men's doubles	11 July
Bronze	Kanako Morisaki; Naho Sato	Tennis	Women's doubles	11 July
Bronze	Yuta Koga	Athletics	Men's 20 km walk	12 July
Bronze	Shunsuke Izumiya	Athletics	Men's 110 m hurdles	12 July
Bronze	Miyu Kawata; Misuzu Kishimoto; Mebae Maruyama; Aoi Tsukahara; Haruna Yamawaki	Gymnastics	Women's group all-around	12 July
Bronze	Tatsuhiko Ito	Athletics	Men's half marathon	13 July
Bronze	Yuki Tagawa	Athletics	Women's half marathon	13 July
Bronze	Miyu Kawata; Misuzu Kishimoto; Mebae Maruyama; Aoi Tsukahara; Haruna Yamawaki	Gymnastics	Women's group 5 balls	13 July
Bronze	Miyu Kawata; Misuzu Kishimoto; Mebae Maruyama; Aoi Tsukahara; Haruna Yamawaki	Gymnastics	Women's Group 3 hoops + 4 clubs	13 July
Bronze	Yuta Ishii	Archery	Men's individual recurve	13 July
