= Indonesia at the 2019 Summer Universiade =

- Flag of Indonesia
- IOC code: INA
- National federation: Indonesia University Sports Council

in Naples, Italy 3 July 2019 – 14 July 2019
- Competitors: 51 (28 men and 23 women) in 8 sports
- Medals: Gold 0 Silver 0 Bronze 1 Total 1

Summer Universiade appearances
- 1959; 1961; 1963; 1965; 1967; 1970; 1973; 1975; 1977; 1979; 1981; 1983; 1985; 1987; 1989; 1991; 1993; 1995; 1997; 1999; 2001; 2003; 2005; 2007; 2009; 2011; 2013; 2015; 2017; 2019; 2021

Indonesia competed at the 2019 Summer Universiade in Naples, Italy held from 3 to 14 July 2019. The country won one bronze medal, in taekwondo.

== Competitors ==
The following is a list of the number of competitors representing Indonesia that participated at the Games:

Sport	Men	Women	Total
Archery	4	4	8
Athletics	7	6	13
Diving	4	0	4
Gymnastics	0	2	2
Swimming	6	6	12
Taekwondo	5	3	8
Tennis	2	2	4
Total	28	23	51

== Medal summary ==
=== Medal by sports ===
Medals by sport
Taekwondo	0	0	1	1
Total	0	0	1	1

=== Medalists ===
Medal	Name	Sport	Event	Date
Bronze	Abdul Rahman Darwin; I Kadek Dwipayana; Muhammad Abdurrahman Wahyu	Taekwondo	Team Poomsae	July 10

== Archery ==
Recurve

Athlete	Event	Ranking round		1/48 Round	1/24 Round	Round of 32	Round of 16	Quarterfinals	Semifinals	Final / BM
Athlete	Event	Score	Rank	Opposition Score	Opposition Score	Opposition Score	Opposition Score	Opposition Score	Opposition Score	Rank
Hendra Purnama	Men's individual	646	14	Bye	Abdubakirov (UZB); W 6–0	Alvarez Bandala (MEX); W 6–2	Mustafin (KAZ); L 4–6	Did not advance		
Muhammad Hanif Wijaya	Men's individual	606	50	Mendoza (PHI); W 6–0	Dorjsuren (MGL); L 2–6	Did not advance				
Diananda Choirunisa	Women's individual	630	8	—	Bye	Fusek (SUI); L 1–7	Did not advance			
Ratna Humaira Khaerunnisa	Women's individual	590	35	—	Deineko (SUI); L 4–6	Did not advance				
Hendra Purnama; Muhammad Hanif Wijaya	Men's team	1252	14	—			Chinese Taipei; L 0–6	did not advance		
Diananda Choirunisa; Ratna Humaira Khaerunnisa	Women's team	1220	12	—			Ukraine; L 3–5	did not advance		
Diananda Choirunisa; Hendra Purnama	Mixed team	1276	6	—		Bye	Mexico; W 5–3	Chinese Taipei; L 2–6	Did not advance	

Compound

Athlete	Event	Ranking round		Round of 48	Round of 32	Round of 16	Quarterfinals	Semifinals	Final / BM	
Athlete	Event	Score	Rank	Opposition Score	Opposition Score	Opposition Score	Opposition Score	Opposition Score	Opposition Score	Rank
Yoke Rizaldi Akbar	Men's individual	695	16	Bye	Dufour (FRA); L 143 (T10)–143 (TX)	Did not advance				
Prima Wisnu Wardhana	Men's individual	686	31	Goh (SGP); L 139 (T8)–139 (T10)	Did not advance					
Ratih Zilizati Fadhly	Women's individual	669	27	Cox (USA); L 130–136	Did not advance					
Tiara Sakti Ramadhani	Women's individual	666	29	Nedachi (JPN); W 133–129	Becerra (MEX); L 133–143	Did not advance				
Yoke Rizaldi Akbar; Prima Wisnu Wardhana	Men's team	1381	12	—		Chinese Taipei; W 152–151	Iran; L 150–153	Did not advance		
Ratih Zilizati Fadhly; Tiara Sakti Ramadhani	Women's team	1335	12	—		Chinese Taipei; L 146 (T17)–146 (T20)	Did not advance			
Ratih Zilizati Fadhly; Yoke Rizaldi Akbar	Mixed team	1364	15	—		Malaysia; W 149 (T18*)–149 (T18)	Turkey; L 154–155	Did not advance		

== Athletics ==
Key

- Note–Ranks given for track events are within the athlete's heat only
- Q = Qualified for the next round
- q = Qualified for the next round as a fastest loser or, in field events, by position without achieving the qualifying target
- NR = National record
- N/A = Round not applicable for the event
- Bye = Athlete not required to compete in round
- DNF = Did not finish

Track & road events
Men

Athlete	Event	Preliminary		Heat		Semifinal		Final	
Athlete	Event	Result	Rank	Result	Rank	Result	Rank	Result	Rank
Eko Rimbawan	100 m	Bye		10.67	5	Did not advance			
Bayu Kertanegara	100 m	10.86	2 Q	10.79	7 PB	Did not advance			
Bilal Bilano	1500 m	3:59.02	7	Did not advance					
Mochammad Bisma D. Abina; Eko Rimbawan; Joko Kuncoro Adi; Bayu Kertanegara	4 × 100 m relay	DNS		Did not advance					

Women

Athlete	Event	Preliminary		Heat		Semifinal		Final	
Athlete	Event	Result	Rank	Result	Rank	Result	Rank	Result	Rank
Jeany Nuraini A. Agreta	100 m	12.14	2 Q	12.31	7	Did not advance			
Tyas Murtiningsih	100 m	Bye		12.27	7	Did not advance			
Emilia Nova	100 m hurdles	—		14.19	6	Did not advance			
Ken Ayuthaya Purnama	100 m hurdles	—		14.70	7	Did not advance			

Field events
Men

Athlete	Event	Qualification		Final	
Athlete	Event	Distance	Position	Distance	Position
Rizky Ghusyafa Pratama	High jump	2.10	9	Did not advance	
Abd Hafiz	Javelin throw	NM		Did not advance	

Women

Athlete	Event	Qualification		Final	
Athlete	Event	Distance	Position	Distance	Position
Nadia Anggraini	High jump	1.70	10 SB	Did not advance	
Tresna Puspita Gustiayu	Discus throw	44.55	12	Did not advance	

== Diving ==
Men

Athlete	Event	Preliminaries		Semifinals		Final	
Athlete	Event	Points	Rank	Points	Rank	Points	Rank
Tri Anggoro Priambodo	1 m springboard	223.25	26	Did not advance			
Aldinsyah Putra Rafi	1 m springboard	263.8	22	Did not advance			
Aldinsyah Putra Rafi	3 m springboard	259.7	30	Did not advance			
Adityo Restu Putra	3 m springboard	284.6	23	Did not advance			
Tri Anggoro Priambodo; Adityo Restu Putra	3 m synchronized springboard	—				305.61	9
Andriyan; Adityo Restu Putra	10 m synchronized platform	—				278.4	8

== Gymnastics ==
=== Artistic ===
Individual

Athlete	Event	Qualification					Final				
Athlete	Event	Apparatus				Rank	Apparatus				Rank
Athlete	Event	Vault (gymnastics)	Uneven bars	Balance beam	Floor (gymnastics)	Rank	Vault (gymnastics)	Uneven bars	Balance beam	Floor (gymnastics)	Rank
Armartiani	Vault	12.375	—			17	—				
Armartiani	Balance beam	—		9.000	—	44	—				
Armartiani	Floor	—			10.600	35	—				
Rifda Irfanaluthfi	Vault	13.350	—			4 Q	13.275	—			5
Rifda Irfanaluthfi	Balance beam	—		10.900	—	29	—				
Rifda Irfanaluthfi	Floor	—			12.050	9	—				

== Swimming ==
Men

Athlete	Event	Heat		Semifinal		Final	
Athlete	Event	Time	Rank	Time	Rank	Time	Rank
Putera Muhammad Randa	100 m freestyle	53.78	57	Did not advance			
Aflah Fadlan Prawira	200 m freestyle	1:53.98	39	Did not advance			
Putera Muhammad Randa	200 m freestyle	1:55.13	44	Did not advance			
Aflah Fadlan Prawira	400 m freestyle	4:00.66	31	Did not advance			
Aflah Fadlan Prawira	1500 m freestyle	15:31.59	10	Did not advance			
Ricky Anggawijaya	50 m backstroke	27.17	49	Did not advance			
I Gede Siman Sudartawa	50 m backstroke	25.91	25	Did not advance			
Ricky Anggawijaya	100 m backstroke	59.04	51	Did not advance			
I Gede Siman Sudartawa	100 m backstroke	57.06	40	Did not advance			
Muhammad Fahri	50 m breaststroke	29.12	42	Did not advance			
Gagarin Nathaniel	50 m breaststroke	28.83	34	Did not advance			
Muhammad Fahri	100 m breaststroke	1:06.22	51	Did not advance			
Gagarin Nathaniel	100 m breaststroke	1:03.37	36	Did not advance			
Aflah Fadlan Prawira	200 m butterfly	2:07.33	26	Did not advance			

Women

Athlete	Event	Heat		Semifinal		Final	
Athlete	Event	Time	Rank	Time	Rank	Time	Rank
Anak Agung Istri Kania Ratih Atmaja	50 m freestyle	26.35	26	Did not advance			
Ressa Kania Dewi	100 m freestyle	58.59	37	Did not advance			
Sagita Putri Krisdewanti	100 m freestyle	58.64	38	Did not advance			
Ressa Kania Dewi	200 m freestyle	2:06.81	26	Did not advance			
Sagita Putri Krisdewanti	200 m freestyle	2:07.95	29	Did not advance			
Ressa Kania Dewi	400 m freestyle	DNS		Did not advance			
Raina Ramdhani	800 m freestyle	9:16.85	14	Did not advance			
Anak Agung Istri Kania Ratih Atmaja	50 m backstroke	30.21	27	Did not advance			
Nurul Fajar Fitriyati	50 m backstroke	30.98	33	Did not advance			
Nurul Fajar Fitriyati	100 m backstroke	1:05.41	31	Did not advance			
Nurul Fajar Fitriyati	200 m backstroke	2:20.55	21	Did not advance			
Anandia Evato	50 m breaststroke	32.92	31	Did not advance			
Anandia Evato	100 m breaststroke	1:12.38	36	Did not advance			
Anak Agung Istri Kania Ratih Atmaja	50 m butterfly	28.29	40	Did not advance			
Ressa Kania Dewi	100 m butterfly	1:04	38	Did not advance			
Ressa Kania Dewi	200 m individual medley	2:20.12	22	Did not advance			
