= Kanako Morisaki =

Japanese tennis player (born 1996)

Kanako Morisaki 森崎 可南子
- Country (sports): Japan
- Born: 5 September 1996 (age 30) Ibaraki, Japan
- Plays: Right (two-handed backhand)
- Prize money: $67,543

Singles
- Career record: 116–112
- Career titles: 0
- Highest ranking: No. 637 (17 June 2019)

Doubles
- Career record: 227–122
- Career titles: 23 ITF
- Highest ranking: No. 167 (27 September 2021)
- Current ranking: No. 196 (3 November 2025)
Medal record
Women's tennis
Representing Japan
Summer Universiade
Bronze medal – third place	2019 Naples	Women's doubles
Gold medal – first place	2019 Naples	Team classification
- Last updated on: 12 August 2026.

Kanako Morisaki (森崎 可南子, Morisaki Kanako; born 5 September 1996) is a Japanese tennis player. She specializes in doubles, and began playing tennis professionally in 2019.

== Career ==
=== Championships ===
February 2020, she became the champion for two consecutive weeks with her partner Erika Sema at the Perth Tennis International tournament held in Australia.

August 2024, she became the champion with his partner Hikaru Sato in the W35 tournament held in Thailand. She won the championship by defeating the Japanese couple Natsumi Kawaguchi and Momoko Kobori in two sets in the final. The next week, they became champions again with their partner Hikaru Sato.

Partnering with Eri Shimizu in October 2024, she won the W35 tournament held in Makinohara, Japan.

In December 2024, partnering Naho Sato, Morisaki won her first W50 tournament in Navi Mumbai, India, defeating Riya Bhatia and Zeel Desai in the final.

=== 2025: WTA Tour debut ===
Morisaki made her WTA Tour main-draw debut at the 2025 Jiangxi Open in the doubles tournament, partnering with Mana Ayukawa.

== ITF Circuit finals ==
=== Doubles: 43 (23 titles, 20 runner-ups) ===
Legend
W60/75 tournaments
W40/50 tournaments
W25/35 tournaments
W15 tournaments

Result	W–L	Date	Tournament	Tier	Surface	Partner	Opponents	Score
Loss	0–1	Mar 2017	Yokohama Challenger, Japan	W25	Hard	(Japan) Minori Yonehara	(Japan) Ayaka Okuno (Japan) Erika Sema	4–6, 4–6
Win	1–1	May 2017	ITF Karuizawa, Japan	W25	Carpet	(Japan) Chisa Hosonuma	(Japan) Ayaka Okuno (Australia) Tammi Patterson	7–5, 6–3
Loss	1–2	Mar 2018	ITF Nishitama, Japan	W15	Hard	(Japan) Chisa Hosonuma	(South Korea) Kim Na-ri (South Korea) Lee So-ra	4–6, 5–7
Loss	1–3	May 2018	ITF Karuizawa, Japan	W25	Carpet	(Japan) Chisa Hosonuma	(Japan) Momoko Kobori (Japan) Ayano Shimizu	0–6, 3–6
Loss	1–4	Jun 2018	ITF Sangju, South Korea	W15	Hard	(Japan) Chisa Hosonuma	(Chinese Taipei) Cho I-hsuan (China) Wang Danni	5–7, 3–6
Win	2–4	Sep 2018	ITF Nanao, Japan	W25	Carpet	(Japan) Megumi Nishimoto	(Japan) Momoko Kobori (Japan) Ayano Shimizu	6–2, 6–3
Win	3–4	Oct 2018	ITF Makinohara, Japan	W25	Carpet	(Japan) Minori Yonehara	(Japan) Chinatsu Shimizu (Japan) Ramu Ueda	6–3, 6–1
Win	4–4	Jan 2019	ITF Antalya, Turkey	W15	Clay	(Japan) Ayaka Okuno	(Uzbekistan) Vlada Ekshibarova (Bulgaria) Julia Stamatova	6–2, 6–2
Win	5–4	Feb 2019	ITF Antalya, Turkey	W15	Clay	(Japan) Ayaka Okuno	(Japan) Haruna Arakawa (Turkey) Doğa Türkmen	7–5, 6–3
Win	6–4	Apr 2019	ITF Kashiwa, Japan	W25	Hard	(Japan) Minori Yonehara	(South Korea) Lee So-ra (Chinese Taipei) Lee Ya-hsuan	4–6, 6–2, [10–5]
Loss	6–5	Jun 2019	Incheon Open, South Korea	W25	Hard	(Japan) Minori Yonehara	(South Korea) Choi Ji-hee (South Korea) Han Na-lae	3–6, 3–6
Loss	6–6	Jun 2019	ITF Gimcheon, South Korea	W15	Hard	(Japan) Ayaka Okuno	(Japan) Ayumi Koshiishi (Russia) Daria Mishina	3–6, 2–6
Win	7–6	Jun 2019	ITF Gimcheon, South Korea	W15	Hard	(Japan) Ayaka Okuno	(South Korea) Jung So-hee (South Korea) Lee So-ra	6–7^{(5)}, 6–0, [10–2]
Win	8–6	Sep 2019	ITF Nanao, Japan	W25	Carpet	(Japan) Minori Yonehara	(Japan) Erina Hayashi (Japan) Miharu Imanishi	6–1, 6–3
Loss	8–7	Sep 2019	ITF Kyoto, Japan	W25	Hard	(Japan) Minori Yonehara	(Chinese Taipei) Lee Ya-hsuan (Chinese Taipei) Wu Fang-hsien	6–3, 4–6, [8–10]
Win	9–7	Feb 2020	Perth International, Australia	W25	Hard	(Japan) Erika Sema	(Australia) Jaimee Fourlis (New Zealand) Erin Routliffe	7–5, 6–4
Win	10–7	Feb 2020	Perth International, Australia	W25	Hard	(Japan) Erika Sema	(New Zealand) Paige Hourigan (Papua New Guinea) Abigail Tere-Apisah	6–1, 4–6, [10–7]
Loss	10–8	Mar 2020	Yokohama Challenger, Japan	W25	Hard	(Japan) Erina Hayashi	(Japan) Robu Kajitani (Japan) Naho Sato	6–1, 4–6, [8–10]
Loss	10–9	May 2021	ITF Naples, United States	W25	Clay	(Japan) Erina Hayashi	(Norway) Ulrikke Eikeri (United States) Catherine Harrison	2–6, 6–3, [2–10]
Loss	10–10	May 2021	Pelham Pro Classic, United States	W25	Clay	(Japan) Erina Hayashi	(Mexico) Fernanda Contreras (Mexico) Marcela Zacarías	0–6, 3–6
Win	11–10	Jun 2021	ITF Santo Domingo, Dominican Republic	W25	Hard	(Japan) Erina Hayashi	(United States) Emina Bektas (United States) Quinn Gleason	6–7^{(3)}, 6–1, [10–7]
Win	12–10	Aug 2021	ITF Oldenzaal, Netherlands	W25	Clay	(Japan) Erika Sema	(Netherlands) Eva Vedder (Netherlands) Stéphanie Visscher	5–7, 6–3, [10–7]
Loss	12–11	Sep 2021	ITF Prague Open, Czech Republic	W60	Clay	(Japan) Erika Sema	(Czech Republic) Miriam Škoch (Czech Republic) Jesika Malečková	3–6, 6–1, [2–10]
Win	13–11	Sep 2021	ITF Frýdek-Místek, Czech Republic	W25	Clay	(Japan) Erika Sema	(Czech Republic) Miriam Škoch (Czech Republic) Anna Sisková	6–3, 6–1
Loss	13–12	May 2022	ITF Villach, Austria	W25	Clay	(Japan) Miharu Imanishi	(Croatia) Lea Bošković (Slovenia) Veronika Erjavec	6–3, 3–6, [9–11]
Win	14–12	May 2022	ITF Annenheim, Austria	W15	Clay	(Japan) Miharu Imanishi	(Switzerland) Sebastianna Scilipoti (Slovakia) Ingrid Vojčináková	6–2, 6–4
Win	15–12	Aug 2022	Verbier Open, Switzerland	W25	Clay	(Japan) Erina Hayashi	(Czech Republic) Michaela Bayerlová (Italy) Nicole Fossa Huergo	6–2, 6–1
Loss	15–13	Oct 2022	ITF Hamamatsu, Japan	W25	Carpet	(Japan) Erina Hayashi	(Japan) Haruna Arakawa (Japan) Aoi Ito	1–6, 6–7^{(6)}
Win	16–13	Jun 2023	ITF Tokyo, Japan	W25	Hard	(Thailand) Luksika Kumkhum	(Australia) Talia Gibson (Japan) Natsumi Kawaguchi	1–6, 6–2, [10–3]
Loss	16–14	Jul 2023	ITF Hong Kong, China SAR	W40	Hard	(Japan) Natsumi Kawaguchi	(Hong Kong) Eudice Chong (Hong Kong) Cody Wong	5–7, 4–6
Loss	16–15	Oct 2023	ITF Nanao, Japan	W40	Carpet	(Japan) Miho Kuramochi	(Japan) Aoi Ito (Japan) Erika Sema	2–6, 5–7
Loss	16–16	Mar 2024	ITF Hinode, Japan	W15	Hard	(Japan) Erina Hayashi	(Japan) Shiori Tominaga (Japan) Hikaru Yoshikawa	3–6, 6–0, [7–10]
Win	17–16	Jun 2024	ITF Tokyo, Japan	W15	Hard	(Japan) Hiromi Abe	(Japan) Yuka Hosoki (Japan) Funa Kozaki	6–2, 6–2
Win	18–16	Aug 2024	ITF Nakhon Si Thammarat, Thailand	W35	Hard	(Japan) Hikaru Sato	(Japan) Natsumi Kawaguchi (Japan) Momoko Kobori	6–2, 6–3
Win	19–16	Sep 2024	ITF Nakhon Si Thammarat, Thailand	W35	Hard	(Japan) Hikaru Sato	(India) Shrivalli Bhamidipaty (India) Vaidehi Chaudhari	6–3, 2–6, [10–8]
Win	20–16	Oct 2024	ITF Makinohara, Japan	W35	Carpet	(Japan) Eri Shimizu	(South Korea) Jeong Bo-young (Japan) Ayumi Miyamoto	6–2, 6–1
Loss	20–17	Nov 2024	Gold Coast International, Australia	W75	Hard	(Japan) Erina Hayashi	(Japan) Hikaru Sato (Japan) Eri Shimizu	7–6^{(0)}, 3–6, [6–10]
Win	21–17	Dec 2024	ITF Navi Mumbai, India	W50	Hard	(Japan) Naho Sato	(India) Riya Bhatia (India) Zeel Desai	4–6, 6–3, [10–7]
Loss	21–18	Jun 2025	Guimarães Ladies Open, Portugal	W50	Hard	(Japan) Hiromi Abe	(India) Ankita Raina (France) Alice Robbe	6–1, 4–6, [8–10]
Win	22–18	Jun 2025	ITF Tauste, Spain	W35	Hard	(Japan) Hiromi Abe	(India) Rutuja Bhosale (India) Ankita Raina	6–3, 6–2
Loss	22–18	Aug 2025	ITF Brașov, Romania	W35	Clay	(Japan) Akiko Omae	(Romania) Ștefania Bojică (Romania) Briana Szabó	7–5, 2–6, [7–10]
Win	23–18	Sep 2025	ITF Slobozia, Romania	W50	Clay	(Japan) Mana Kawamura	(Romania) Elena Ruxandra Bertea (Russia) Daria Lodikova	7–6^{(1)}, 1–6, [10–2]
Loss	23–19	Nov 2025	ITF Hamamatsu, Japan	W35	Carpet	(Japan) Mana Ayukawa	(Japan) Hikaru Sato (Japan) Eri Shimizu	3–6, 2–6
Loss	23–20	Nov 2026	Keio Challenger, Japan	W50	Hard	(South Korea) Kim Eun-chae	(Chinese Taipei) Li Yu-yun (Japan) Sara Saito	4–6, 2–6
