= Alice Robbe =

French tennis player (born 2000)

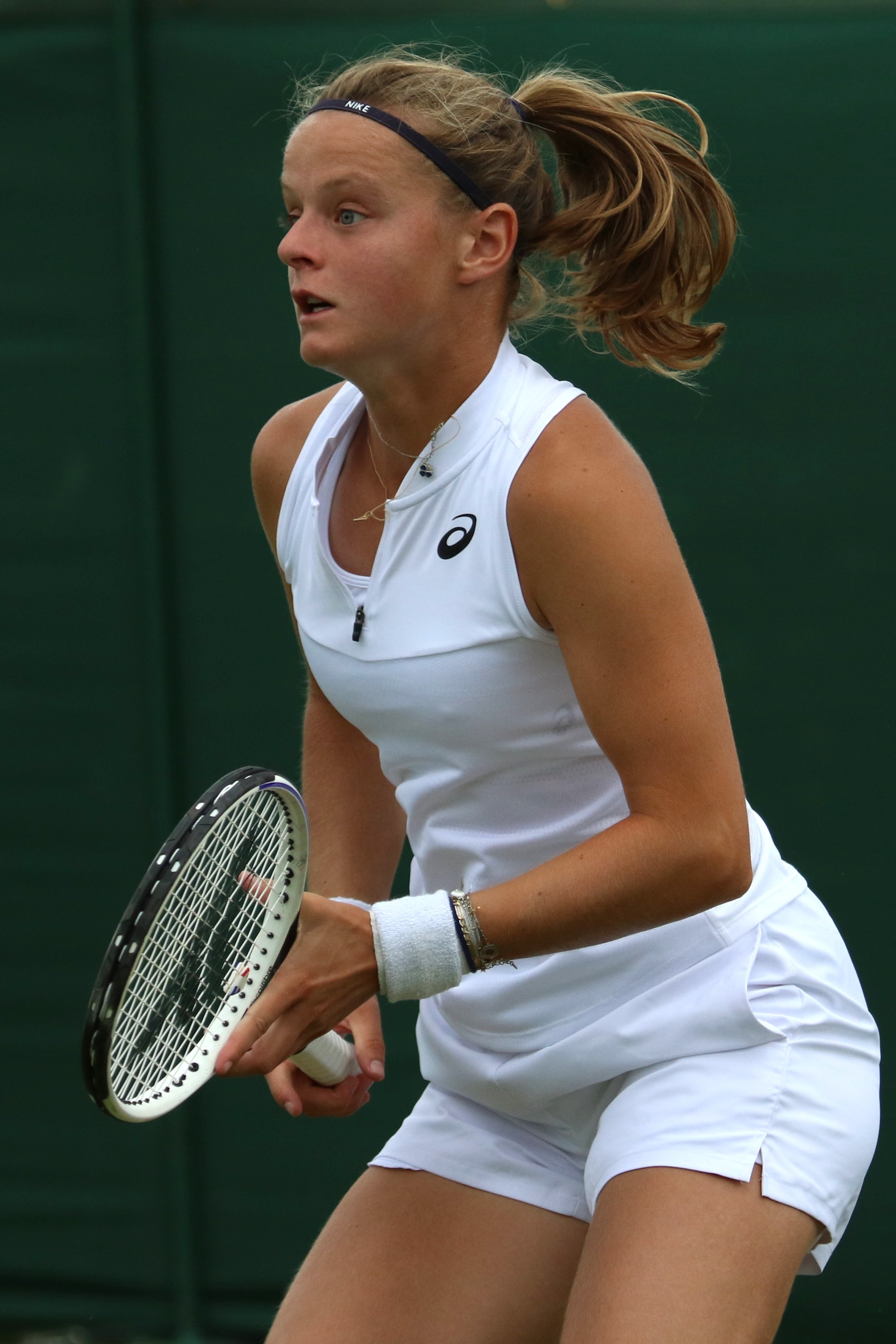
- Robbe at the 2023 Wimbledon Championships
- Country (sports): France
- Born: 10 May 2000 (age 26)
- Retired: 2026
- Prize money: US$240,179

Singles
- Career record: 226–205
- Career titles: 3 ITF
- Highest ranking: No. 190 (22 May 2023)
- Current ranking: No. 1050 (19 October 2026)

Grand Slam singles results
- Australian Open: Q1 (2024)
- French Open: Q3 (2023)
- Wimbledon: Q1 (2023)
- US Open: Q1 (2023)

Doubles
- Career record: 101–121
- Career titles: 6 ITF
- Highest ranking: No. 285 (17 July 2023)
- Current ranking: No. 981 (19 October 2026)

Grand Slam doubles results
- French Open: 1R (2023)
Medal record
Women's tennis
Representing France
Summer Universiade
Bronze medal – third place	2019 Naples	Mixed
Bronze medal – third place	2021 Chengdu	Singles
- Last updated on: 19 October 2026.

Alice Robbe (born 10 May 2000) is a French former professional tennis player.

She has career-high WTA rankings of No. 190 in singles and No. 285 in doubles. Robbe has won three singles titles and eight doubles titles on the ITF Women's Circuit.

== Career ==
At the 2019 Summer Universiade held in Naples, Italy, Robbe won the bronze medal in the mixed doubles draw, alongside Ronan Joncour.

She made her major debut at the 2023 French Open in doubles, partnering Alice Tubello.

Robbe made her WTA Tour singles debut as a wildcard entrant at the 2024 Open de Rouen, losing to top seed Anastasia Pavlyuchenkova in the first round. She announced her retirement from professional tennis in June 2026.

== Grand Slam performance timeline ==
Key
W	F	SF	QF	#R	RR	Q#	P#	DNQ	A	Z#	PO	G	S	B	NMS	NTI	P	NH

(W) winner; (F) finalist; (SF) semifinalist; (QF) quarterfinalist; (#R) rounds 4, 3, 2, 1; (RR) round-robin stage; (Q#) qualification round; (P#) preliminary round; (DNQ) did not qualify; (A) absent; (Z#) Davis/Fed Cup Zonal Group (with number indication) or (PO) play-off; (G) gold, (S) silver or (B) bronze Olympic/Paralympic medal; (NMS) not a Masters tournament; (NTI) not a Tier I tournament; (P) postponed; (NH) not held; (SR) strike rate (events won / competed); (W–L) win–loss record.
To avoid confusion and double counting, these charts are updated at the conclusion of a tournament or when the player's participation has ended.

=== Singles ===
Tournament	2023	W–L
Australian Open	A	0–0
French Open	Q3	0–0
Wimbledon	Q1	0–0
US Open	Q1	0–0
Win–loss	0–0	0–0

== ITF Circuit finals ==
=== Singles: 9 (3 titles, 6 runner-ups) ===
Legend W60 tournaments (0–1) W25 tournaments (3–2) W15 tournaments (0–3)	Finals by surface Hard (1–3) Clay (2–2) Carpet (0–1)

Result	W–L	Date	Tournament	Tier	Surface	Opponent	Score
Loss	0–1	Aug 2019	ITF Dublin, Ireland	W15	Carpet	(Republic of Ireland) Georgia Drummy	1–6, 2–6
Loss	0–2	Jul 2021	ITF Prokuplje, Serbia	W15	Clay	(Latvia) Darja Semenistaja	2–6, 6–2, 3–6
Win	1–2	May 2022	ITF Montemor-o-Novo, Portugal	W25	Hard	(Turkey) Pemra Özgen	6–1, 6–2
Loss	1–3	Dec 2022	ITF Monastir, Tunisia	W25	Hard	(Germany) Silvia Ambrosio	6–4, 0–6, 5–7
Win	2–3	Apr 2023	ITF Bujumbura, Burundi	W25	Clay	(Burundi) Sada Nahimana	6–1, 6–4
Win	3–3	Apr 2023	ITF Bujumbura, Burundi	W25	Clay	(Netherlands) Jasmijn Gimbrère	6–1, 6–2
Loss	3–4	May 2023	Open Saint-Gaudens, France	W60	Clay	(United States) Robin Montgomery	5–7, 4–6
Loss	3–5	Oct 2023	ITF Cherbourg-en-Cotentin, France	W25	Hard (i)	(Ukraine) Veronika Podrez	4–6, 6–2, 4–6
Loss	3–6	Mar 2025	ITF Hagetmau, France	W15	Hard (i)	(Ukraine) Veronika Podrez	4–6, 2–6

=== Doubles: 14 (8 titles, 6 runner-ups) ===
Legend W40/50 tournaments (1–1) W25/35 tournaments (3–2) W15 tournaments (4–3)	Finals by surface Hard (7–5) Clay (1–1)

Result	W–L	Date	Tournament	Tier	Surface	Partner	Opponents	Score
Loss	0–1	Nov 2019	ITF Monastir, Tunisia	W15	Hard	(France) Manon Arcangioli	(Serbia) Tamara Čurović (France) Carole Monnet	3–6, 4–6
Win	1–1	Mar 2021	ITF Bratislava, Slovakia	W15	Hard	(Estonia) Elena Malõgina	(Slovenia) Nina Potočnik (Croatia) Iva Primorac	7–6^{(7–2)}, 6–2
Win	2–1	Mar 2021	ITF Bratislava, Slovakia	W15	Hard	(Estonia) Elena Malõgina	(Czech Republic) Tereza Smitková (Czech Republic) Veronika Vikovska	3–6, 6–3, [10–5]
Loss	2–2	Jul 2021	ITF Prokuplje, Serbia	W15	Clay	(Serbia) Draginja Vuković	(Romania) Ioana Gașpar (Russia) Ekaterina Vishnevskaya	4–6, 3–6
Loss	2–3	Apr 2022	ITF Nottingham, UK	W25	Hard	(United Kingdom) Lauryn John-Baptiste	(Czech Republic) Gabriela Knutson (Slovakia) Katarína Strešnáková	6–7^{(5)}, 3–6
Win	3–3	Jul 2022	ITF Darmstadt, Germany	W25	Clay	(Estonia) Elena Malõgina	(Spain) Jéssica Bouzas Maneiro (Spain) Leyre Romero Gormaz	7–5, 7–5
Win	4–3	Nov 2022	Trnava Indoor, Slovakia	W25	Hard (i)	Ekaterina Makarova	(Slovakia) Katarína Kužmová (Czech Republic) Anna Sisková	6–3, 7–5
Loss	4–4	Feb 2023	ITF Porto, Portugal	W40	Hard (i)	(Croatia) Tara Würth	(Switzerland) Céline Naef (Belgium) Yanina Wickmayer	1–6, 4–6
Win	5–4	Mar 2024	ITF Montreal, Canada	W15	Hard (i)	(United States) Jessie Aney	(United States) Ashton Bowers (Poland) Zuzanna Pawlikowska	5–7, 6–3, [10–3]
Loss	5–5	Jul 2024	ITF Roehampton, United Kingdom	W35	Hard	(Australia) Gabriella Da Silva-Fick	(United Kingdom) Holly Hutchinson (United Kingdom) Ella McDonald	2–6, 6–3, [3–10]
Win	6–5	Feb 2025	ITF Manacor, Spain	W15	Hard	(Netherlands) Merel Hoedt	(China) Tian Jialin (Italy) Laura Mair	7-6^{(3)}, 6-2
Loss	6–6	Feb 2025	ITF Manacor, Spain	W15	Hard	(Netherlands) Jasmijn Gimbrère	(Netherlands) Isis Louise van den Broek (Netherlands) Sarah van Emst	4–6, 4–6
Win	7–6	May 2025	ITF Nottingham, United Kingdom	W35	Hard	(Kosovo) Arlinda Rushiti	(United Kingdom) Naiktha Bains (United Kingdom) Holly Hutchinson	3–6, 6–4, [10–5]
Win	8–6	Jun 2025	Guimarães Ladies Open, Portugal	W50	Hard	(India) Ankita Raina	(Japan) Hiromi Abe (Japan) Kanako Morisaki	1–6, 6–4, [10–8]
