= Emily Arbuthnott =

British tennis player

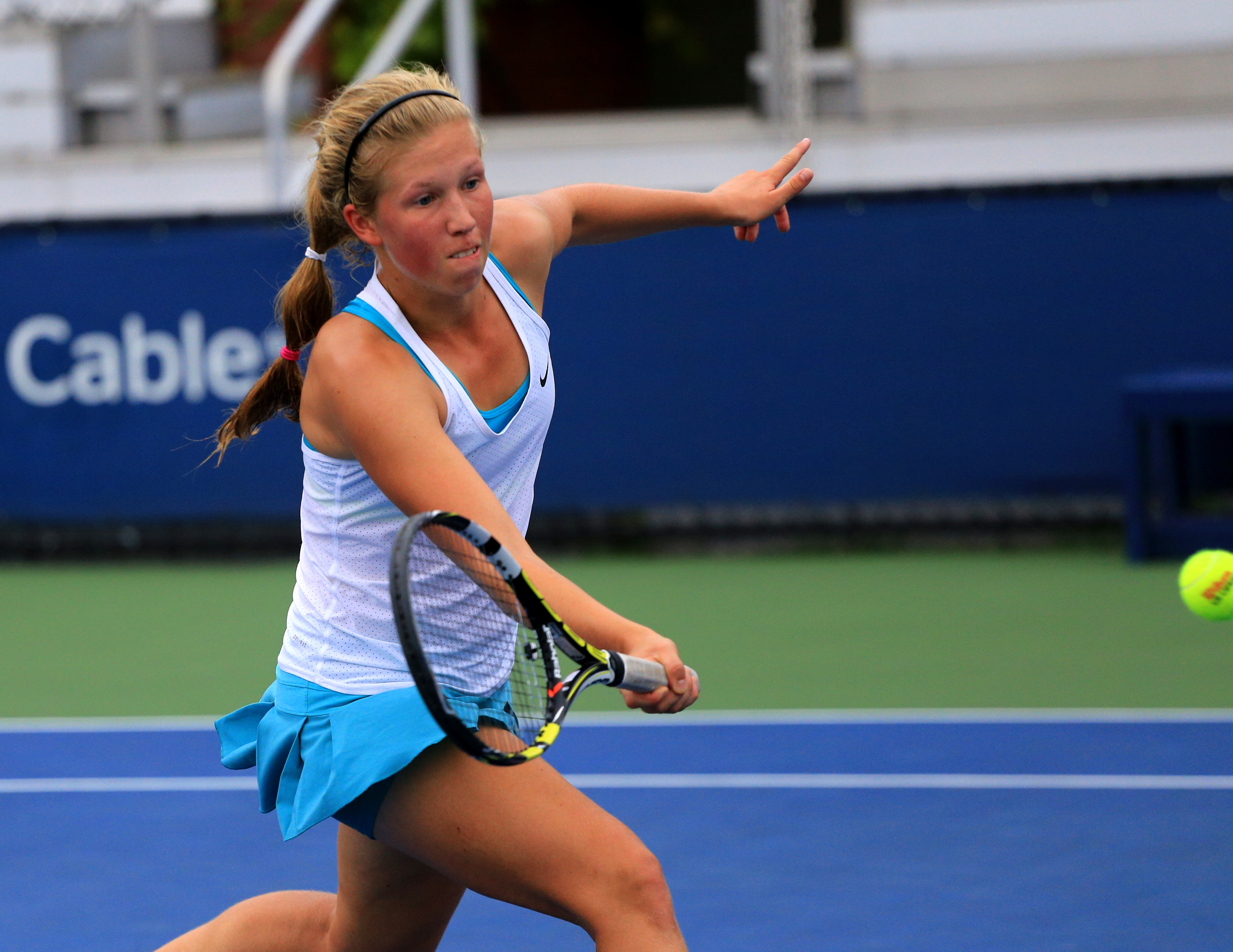
- Emily Arbuthnott, 2015
- Country (sports): United Kingdom
- Born: 3 October 1997 (age 28) Kingston upon Thames, England
- Plays: Right (two-handed backhand)
- Prize money: $30,222

Singles
- Career record: 95–55
- Career titles: 2 ITF
- Highest ranking: No. 551 (26 September 2016)

Doubles
- Career record: 93–30
- Career titles: 14 ITF
- Highest ranking: No. 319 (28 January 2019)
Medal record
Women's tennis
Representing United Kingdom
Summer Universiade
Silver medal – second place	2019 Naples	Singles
Bronze medal – third place	2017 Taipei	Doubles

Emily Frances Alice Arbuthnott (born 3 October 1997) is a British former professional tennis player.

Arbuthnott has been ranked as high as No. 551 in singles and No. 319 in doubles by the WTA.

At the 2017 Summer Universiade held in Taipei, Taiwan, she won the bronze medal in women's doubles, along with Olivia Nicholls.

At the 2019 Summer Universiade held in Naples, Italy, she won the silver medal in women's singles.

She played for the Stanford University tennis team, where she majored in economics. Born in Kingston upon Thames, England, Emily's parents are James and Sally, she has two brothers, Bertie and Freddie, and her aunt Joanna Copley played lacrosse for England.

== ITF Circuit finals ==
=== Singles: 4 (2 titles, 2 runner-ups) ===
Legend $15,000 tournaments $10,000 tournaments	Finals by surface Hard (1–1) Clay (1–1)

Result	W–L	Date	Tournament	Tier	Surface	Opponent	Score
Loss	0–1	Aug 2015	ITF Chiswick, United Kingdom	10,000	Hard	(United Kingdom) Katy Dunne	3–6, 3–6
Win	1–1	Nov 2015	ITF Sharm El Sheikh, Egypt	10,000	Hard	(United Kingdom) Lisa Whybourn	3–6, 6–1, 7–6^{(3)}
Loss	1–2	Aug 2016	ITF Las Palmas, Spain	10,000	Clay	(Venezuela) Andrea Gámiz	1–6, 1–6
Win	2–2	Sep 2017	ITF Hammamet, Tunisia	15,000	Clay	(United Kingdom) Francesca Jones	3–6, 7–5, 6–4

=== Doubles: 20 (14 titles, 6 runner-ups) ===
Legend $25,000 tournaments $15,000 tournaments $10,000 tournaments	Finals by surface Hard (4–3) Clay (10–3)

Result	W–L	Date	Tournament	Tier	Surface	Partner	Opponents	Score
Loss	0–1	Aug 2015	ITF Chiswick, UK	10,000	Hard	(United Kingdom) Freya Christie	(United Kingdom) Harriet Dart (United Kingdom) Katy Dunne	2–6, 2–6
Win	1–1	Oct 2015	ITF Sharm El Sheikh, Egypt	10,000	Hard	(United Kingdom) Lisa Whybourn	(Chinese Taipei) Hsu Chieh-yu (Russia) Anna Morgina	6–2, 6–4
Win	2–1	Oct 2015	ITF Sharm El Sheikh	10,000	Hard	(United Kingdom) Lisa Whybourn	(Belgium) Vicky Geurinckx (Slovakia) Tereza Mihalíková	6–3, 6–0
Win	3–1	Feb 2016	ITF Sunderland, UK	10,000	Hard (i)	(Denmark) Emilie Francati	(France) Manon Arcangioli (United Kingdom) Harriet Dart	6–3, 4–6, [10–5]
Win	4–1	Apr 2016	ITF Antalya, Turkey	10,000	Hard	(United Kingdom) Harriet Dart	(Russia) Anastasia Gasanova (Georgia (country)) Ana Shanidze	6–1, 6–0
Win	5–1	Jul 2016	ITF Pärnu, Estonia	10,000	Clay	(Czech Republic) Anastasia Zarycká	(Russia) Ekaterina Kazionova (Latvia) Deniza Marcinkēviča	6–4, 7–5
Win	6–1	Aug 2016	ITF Rebecq, Belgium	10,000	Clay	(Germany) Katharina Hobgarski	(Poland) Justyna Jegiołka (United States) Chiara Scholl	6–1, 6–1
Win	7–1	Sep 2016	ITF Sion, Switzerland	10,000	Clay	(Switzerland) Karin Kennel	(Switzerland) Leonie Küng (Switzerland) Simona Waltert	6–2, 6–1
Loss	7–2	Jul 2017	Amstelveen Open, Netherlands	15,000	Clay	(Australia) Belinda Woolcock	(United States) Dasha Ivanova (Netherlands) Rosalie van der Hoek	4–6, 4–6
Win	8–2	Aug 2017	ITF Porto, Portugal	15,000	Clay	(Denmark) Emilie Francati	(Italy) Gaia Sanesi (Italy) Lucrezia Stefanini	6–4, 6–3
Win	9–2	Jun 2018	ITF Ystad, Sweden	25,000	Clay	(Denmark) Emilie Francati	(Chinese Taipei) Chen Pei-hsuan (Chinese Taipei) Wu Fang-hsien	6–2, 6–1
Loss	9–3	Aug 2018	ITF Woking, UK	25,000	Hard	(Kazakhstan) Anna Danilina	(Hungary) Dalma Gálfi (Greece) Valentini Grammatikopoulou	0–6, 6–4, [9–11]
Loss	9–4	Aug 2018	ITF Las Palmas, Spain	25,000	Clay	(Sweden) Mirjam Björklund	(Netherlands) Quirine Lemoine (Netherlands) Eva Wacanno	6–7^{(6)}, 1–6
Loss	9–5	Sep 2018	ITF Pula, Italy	25,000	Clay	(Germany) Katharina Hobgarski	(Italy) Martina Colmegna (Italy) Federica di Sarra	6–7^{(0)}, 2–6
Win	10–5	Jun 2019	ITF Ystad, Sweden	25,000	Clay	(Kazakhstan) Anna Danilina	(North Macedonia) Lina Gjorcheska (Russia) Anastasiya Komardina	3–6, 6–2, [10–4]
Win	11–5	Jun 2019	ITF Alkmaar, Netherlands	15,000	Clay	(Australia) Gabriella Da Silva-Fick	(Netherlands) Eva Vedder (Netherlands) Stéphanie Visscher	6–4, 1–6, [10–8]
Win	12–5	Aug 2019	ITF Wanfercee-Baulet, Belgium	15,000	Clay	(Belgium) Chelsea Vanhoutte	(Turkey) Cemre Anıl (Sweden) Marina Yudanov	3–6, 7–5, [10–8]
Win	13–5	Aug 2019	ITF Haren, Netherlands	15,000	Clay	(United Kingdom) Ali Collins	(Turkey) Cemre Anıl (Russia) Anna Pribylova	3–6, 6–0, [10–4]
Loss	13–6	Oct 2020	ITF Sharm El Sheikh	15,000	Hard	(United Kingdom) Freya Christie	(Ukraine) Viktoriia Dema (Poland) Martyna Kubka	4–6, 3–6
Win	14–6	Aug 2021	ITF Wanfercee-Baulet	15,000	Clay	(Belgium) Chelsea Vanhoutte	(France) Flavie Brugnone (France) Lucie Wargnier	7–5, 6–4
