= Chompoothip Jundakate =

Thai tennis player (born 1995)

Chompoothip Jundakate ชมภู่ทิพย์ จันดาเขต
- Country (sports): Thailand
- Born: 3 November 1995 (age 30)
- Plays: Right (two-handed backhand)
- Prize money: $26,787

Singles
- Career record: 60–91
- Highest ranking: No. 540 (24 June 2019)

Doubles
- Career record: 68–102
- Career titles: 3 ITF
- Highest ranking: No. 612 (15 July 2019)
- Current ranking: No. 1347 (27 May 2024)

Team competitions
- Fed Cup: 5–1
Medal record
Representing Thailand
Women's Tennis
Summer Universiade
Bronze medal – third place	2019 Naples	Singles
- Last updated on: 6 June 2024.

Chompoothip Jundakate (Thai: ชมภู่ทิพย์ จันดาเขต; born 3 November 1995) is an inactive Thai tennis player.

Jundakate has a career-high singles ranking by the WTA of 540, achieved on 24 June 2019. She also has a career-high WTA doubles ranking of 612, reached on 15 July 2019. She has won two doubles titles on the ITF Women's Circuit.

Jundakate represents Thailand in the Fed Cup.

== ITF Circuit finals ==
Legend
$100,000 tournaments
$80,000 tournaments
$60,000 tournaments
$25,000 tournaments
$15,000 tournaments
$10,000 tournaments

=== Doubles: 5 (3 titles, 2 runner–ups) ===
Result	W–L	Date	Tournament	Tier	Surface	Partner	Opponents	Score
Loss	0–1	Nov 2015	ITF Bangkok, Thailand	15,000	Hard	(Thailand) Peangtarn Plipuech	(Japan) Ayaka Okuno (Ukraine) Valeriya Strakhova	2–6, 6–7^{(2)}
Loss	0–2	Oct 2016	ITF Hua Hin, Thailand	10,000	Hard	(Thailand) Tamachan Momkoonthod	(Thailand) Nudnida Luangnam (Thailand) Varunya Wongteanchai	2–6, 7–6^{(2)}, [0–10]
Win	1–2	Nov 2018	ITF Nonthaburi, Thailand	15,000	Hard	(Chinese Taipei) Lee Hua-chen	(Kazakhstan) Dariya Detkovskaya (Thailand) Supapitch Kuearum	6–1, 6–3
Win	2–2	Nov 2018	ITF Nonthaburi, Thailand	15,000	Hard	(Thailand) Tamachan Momkoonthod	(Netherlands) Suzan Lamens (Switzerland) Nina Stadler	6–3, 6–4
Win	3–2	Jun 2022	ITF Chiang Rai, Thailand	15,000	Hard	(Thailand) Tamachan Momkoonthod	(Thailand) Anchisa Chanta (Thailand) Patcharin Cheapchandej	w/o
