= Ana Filipa Santos =

Portuguese tennis player (born 1996)

- Country (sports): Portugal
- Born: 12 February 1996 (age 30)
- Plays: Right (one-handed backhand)
- Prize money: $51,552

Singles
- Career record: 71–164
- Career titles: 0
- Highest ranking: No. 814 (21 October 2024)
- Current ranking: No. 946 (10 August 2026)

Doubles
- Career record: 85–123
- Career titles: 3 ITF
- Highest ranking: No. 486 (22 June 2026)
- Current ranking: No. 503 (10 August 2026)

Team competitions
- Fed Cup: 1–4
- Last updated on: 17 August 2026.

Ana Filipa Santos (born 12 February 1996) is a Portuguese tennis player.

Santos has a career-high doubles ranking by the WTA of 486, achieved on 22 June 2026.

Santos made her Fed Cup debut for Portugal in 2019.

Alongside Jacqueline Cabaj Awad from Sweden, Santos won her first international title in doubles in Cancún, Mexico. They won the final against French-Russian pairing of Astrid Cirotte and Anastasia Sysoeva.

Outside from tennis, Santos has a master's degree in Micro and Nanotechnologies Engineering from Faculdade de Ciências e Tecnologia, part of NOVA University Lisbon. She has defended her master's thesis (available here) with a final grade of 18 out of 20 marks.

== ITF Circuit finals ==
=== Doubles: 6 (3 titles, 3 runner-ups) ===
Legend W35 tournaments W15 tournaments (3–3)	Finals by surface Hard (2–2) Clay (1–1)

Result	W–L	Date	Tournament	Tier	Surface	Partner	Opponents	Score
Loss	0–1	Nov 2019	ITF Lousada, Portugal	W15	Hard (i)	(Spain) Almudena Sanz-Llaneza Fernández	(Portugal) Francisca Jorge (Spain) Olga Parres Azcoitia	4–6, 3–6
Win	1–1	Feb 2022	ITF Cancún, Mexico	W15	Hard	(Sweden) Jacqueline Cabaj Awad	(France) Astrid Cirotte (Russia) Anastasia Sysoeva	6–4, 6–3
Loss	1-2	May 2022	ITF Curitiba, Brazil	W15	Clay	(Bolivia) Noelia Zeballos	(Argentina) Martina Capurro Taborda (Chile) Fernanda Labraña	1–6, 4–6
Win	2–2	Mar 2024	ITF São João da Boa Vista, Brazil	W15	Clay	(Argentina) Victoria Bosio	(Italy) Verena Meliss (Italy) Camilla Zanolini	6–2, 6–4
Loss	2–3	Aug 2024	ITF Valladolid, Spain	W15	Hard	(Spain) Celia Cerviño Ruiz	(Germany) Kathleen Kanev (United Kingdom) Eliz Maloney	2–6, 6–4, [4–10]
Win	3–3	Nov 2025	ITF Lousada, Portugal	W15	Hard (i)	(Portugal) Angelina Voloshchuk	(Spain) Celia Cerviño Ruiz (Italy) Valentina Losciale	6–4, 6–4
