= Naho Sato =

Japanese tennis player (born 2001)

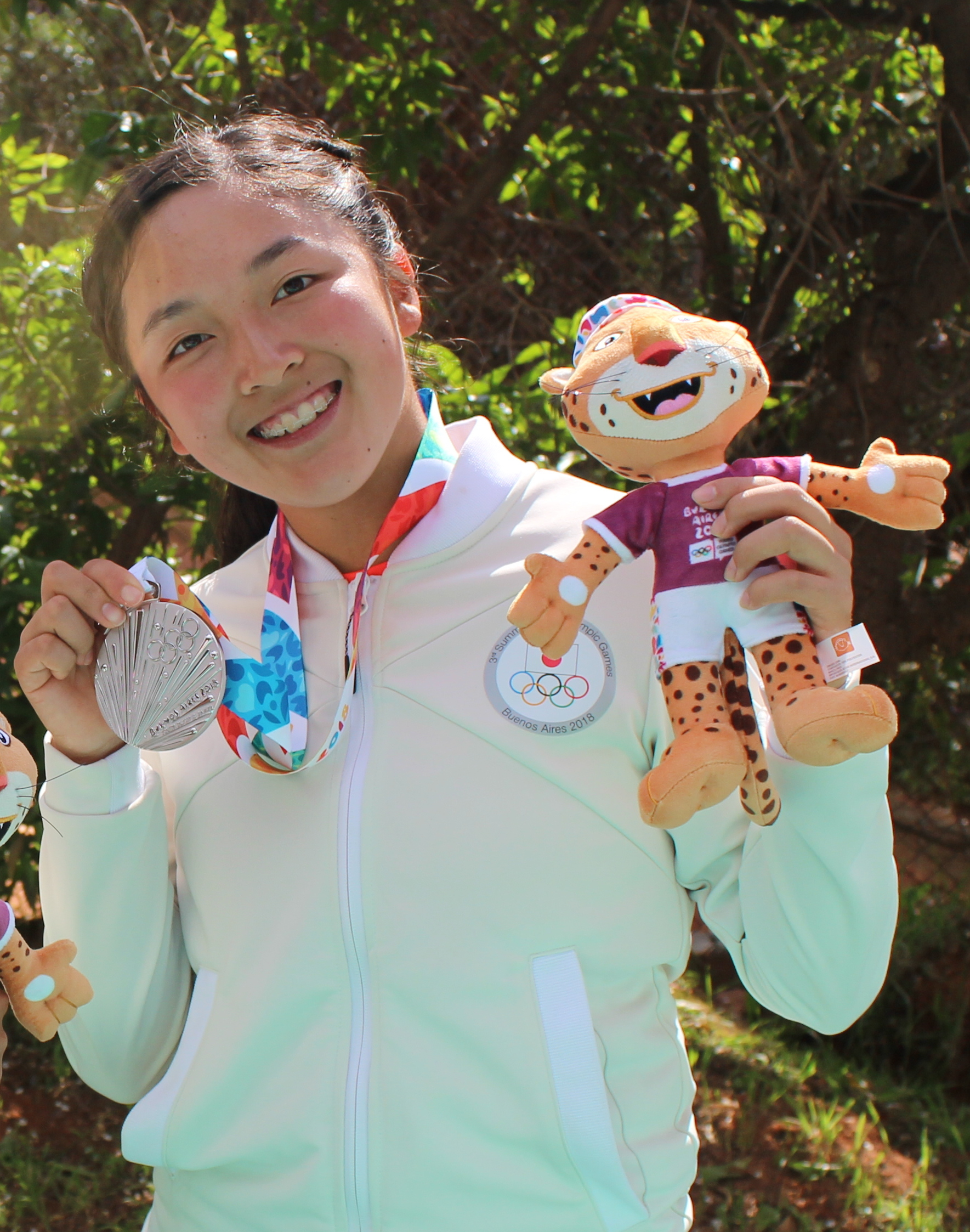
- Country (sports): Japan
- Born: 23 January 2001 (age 25) Tokyo, Japan
- Plays: Right-Handed
- Prize money: $96,751

Singles
- Career record: 177–124
- Career titles: 5 ITF
- Highest ranking: No. 319 (21 October 2024)
- Current ranking: No. 399 (9 November 2026)

Doubles
- Career record: 129–72
- Career titles: 18 ITF
- Highest ranking: No. 184 (23 December 2024)
- Current ranking: No. 428 (27 October 2025)
- Last updated on: 27 October 2025.

Naho Sato
Medal record

Representing Japan

Women's Tennis

Youth Olympic Games
Silver medal – second place	2018 Buenos Aires	Doubles

Summer Universiade
Gold medal – first place	2019 Naples	Singles
Bronze medal – third place	2019 Naples	Doubles
Gold medal – first place	2019 Naples	Team

Naho Sato (born 23 January 2001) is a Japanese tennis player.

Sato has been ranked as high as world No. 319 in singles and 195 in doubles by the Women's Tennis Association (WTA). On the ITF Junior Circuit, Sato's career-high ranking is world No. 7 (March 2018).

== Career ==
In 2018, she was runner-up in the junior women's doubles at Roland Garros, along with her compatriot Yuki Naito, after losing the final against Caty McNally and Iga Świątek.

At the 2018 Youth Olympic Games held in Buenos Aires, she won the silver medal in women's doubles, along with Naito. In the women's doubles final, Naito and Sato were defeated by the Slovenian Kaja Juvan and the Polish Iga Świątek, who competed in the mixed team modality owned by the Youth Olympians.

At the 2019 Summer Universiade held in Naples, Italy, she won the gold medal in women's singles and a bronze medal in women's doubles, along with Kanako Morisaki.

== ITF Circuit finals ==
=== Singles: 10 (7 titles, 3 runner ups) ===
Legend W25/35 tournaments (1–2) W15 tournaments (6–1)	Finals by surface Hard (6–2) Clay (1–1)

Result	W–L	Date	Tournament	Tier	Surface	Opponents	Score
Loss	0–1	Feb 2018	ITF Manacor, Spain	W15	Clay	(Moldova) Alexandra Perper	1–6, 5–7
Win	1–1	Nov 2018	ITF Antalya, Turkey	W15	Clay	(Romania) Oana Georgeta Simion	3–6, 6–4, 7–6^{(3)}
Win	2–1	Jun 2022	ITF Chiang Rai, Thailand	W15	Hard	(Thailand) Mananchaya Sawangkaew	6–4, 6–2
Win	3–1	Mar 2023	ITF Monastir, Tunisia	W15	Hard	(China) Wu Meixu	0–6, 6–4, 6–1
Win	4–1	Mar 2023	ITF Monastir, Tunisia	W15	Hard	(United States) Paris Corley	2–6, 6–4, 6–0
Loss	4–2	Feb 2024	ITF Traralgon International, Australia	W35	Hard	(United Kingdom) Amarni Banks	3–6, 3–6
Win	5–2	Mar 2024	ITF Kuala Lumpur, Malaysia	W15	Hard	(China) Yuan Chengyiyi	6–4, 6–3
Win	6–2	Aug 2026	ITF Yeongwol, South Korea	W15	Hard	(Thailand) Kamonwan Yodpetch	6–3, 6–2
Win	7–2	Sep 2026	ITF Wagga Wagga, Australia	W35	Hard	(Japan) Mio Mushika	6–3, 6–3
Loss	7–3	Oct 2026	ITF Wagga Wagga, Australia	W35	Hard	(Japan) Ena Shibahara	2–6, 3–6

=== Doubles: 27 (19 titles, 8 runner ups) ===
Legend W100 tournaments W40/50 tournaments W25/35 tournaments W15 tournaments	Finals by surface Hard (14–7) Clay (4–1) Carpet (1–0)

Result	W–L	Date	Tournament	Tier	Surface	Partner	Opponents	Score
Win	1–0	Feb 2018	ITF Manacor, Spain	W15	Clay	(Japan) Yukina Saigo	(Moldova) Alexandra Perper (Germany) Lisa Ponomar	3–6, 7–5, [10–8]
Win	2–0	Nov 2018	ITF Antalya, Turkey	W15	Clay	(Germany) Lisa Ponomar	(Romania) Ioana Gașpar (Romania) Oana Georgeta Simion	6–4, 6–2
Win	3–0	Mar 2020	Keio Challenger, Japan	W25	Hard	(Japan) Robu Kajitani	(Japan) Erina Hayashi (Japan) Kanako Morisaki	1–6, 6–4, [10–8]
Win	4–0	Aug 2021	ITF Frederiksberg, Denmark	W15	Clay	(Indonesia) Priska Madelyn Nugroho	(Ukraine) Viktoriia Dema (Bulgaria) Ani Vangelova	6–0, 6–1
Loss	4–1	Feb 2022	ITF Antalya, Turkey	W25	Clay	(Japan) Funa Kozaki	(Czech Republic) Miriam Kolodziejová (Czech Republic) Jesika Malečková	6–7^{(2)}, 6–7^{(4)}
Win	5–1	Feb 2022	ITF Antalya, Turkey	W25	Clay	(Japan) Funa Kozaki	(Belgium) Marie Benoit (Romania) Nicoleta Dascălu	6–2, 6–4
Loss	5–2	May 2022	ITF Chiang Rai, Thailand	W25	Hard	(Japan) Misaki Matsuda	(Japan) Momoko Kobori (Thailand) Luksika Kumkhum	3–6, 3–6
Win	6–2	Jun 2022	ITF Chiang Rai, Thailand	W15	Hard	(Japan) Anri Nagata	(China) Liu Fangzhou (China) Xun Fangying	6–2, 6–4
Loss	6–3	Aug 2022	ITF Monastir, Tunisia	W15	Hard	(France) Yasmine Mansouri	(Japan) Saki Imamura (Indonesia) Priska Madelyn Nugroho	1–6, 3–6
Win	7–3	Nov 2022	Keio Challenger, Japan	W25	Hard	(Japan) Saki Imamura	(South Korea) Han Na-lae (Japan) Mai Hontama	6–4, 4–6, [10–5]
Win	8–3	Feb 2023	ITF Monastir, Tunisia	W15	Hard	(Switzerland) Leonie Küng	(Greece) Eleni Christofi (United States) Paris Corley	6–2, 6–1
Win	9–3	Mar 2023	ITF Monastir, Tunisia	W15	Hard	(China) Liu Fangzhou	(Greece) Eleni Christofi (United States) Paris Corley	6–4, 6–1
Loss	9–4	Apr 2023	ITF Kashiwa, Japan	W15	Hard	(Japan) Saki Imamura	(Netherlands) Arianne Hartono (Australia) Priscilla Hon	4–6, 6–3, [7–10]
Loss	9–5	Sep 2023	ITF Nakhon Si Thammarat, Thailand	W25	Hard	(Japan) Misaki Matsuda	(Thailand) Punnin Kovapitukted (China) Tang Qianhui	6–7^{(2)}, 6–1, [3–10]
Loss	9–6	Sep 2023	Perth Tennis International, Australia	W25	Hard	(Japan) Misaki Matsuda	(Australia) Destanee Aiava (Australia) Maddison Inglis	1–6, 4–6
Win	10–6	Oct 2023	ITF Cairns Australia	W25	Hard	(Japan) Yuki Naito	(Australia) Lizette Cabrera (Australia) Maddison Inglis	4–6, 6–3, [10–2]
Win	11–6	Feb 2024	ITF Nakhon Si Thammarat, Thailand	W35	Hard	(Thailand) Peangtarn Plipuech	(China) Feng Shuo (China) Zheng Wushuang	6–1, 4–6, [10–7]
Win	12–6	Feb 2024	Traralgon International, Australia	W35	Hard	(Japan) Yuki Naito	(Australia) Destanee Aiava (Australia) Tenika McGiffin	6–1, 6–3
Win	13–6	Jul 2024	ITF Figueira da Foz, Portugal	W100	Hard	(Japan) Sayaka Ishii	(United Kingdom) Madeleine Brooks (United Kingdom) Sarah Beth Grey	7–6^{(1)}, 7–5
Win	14–6	Sep 2024	ITF Nanao, Japan	W50	Carpet	(Japan) Aoi Ito	(Japan) Momoko Kobori (Japan) Ayano Shimizu	6–1, 6–3
Win	15–6	Dec 2024	ITF Navi Mumbai, India	W50	Hard	(Japan) Kanako Morisaki	(India) Riya Bhatia (India) Zeel Desai	4–6, 6–3, [10–7]
Win	16–6	Mar 2025	ITF Kashiwa, Japan	W15	Hard	(South Korea) Ku Yeon-woo	(Japan) Eri Shimizu (Japan) Kisa Yoshioka	6–2, 6–4
Loss	16–7	Oct 2025	Brisbane QTC Tennis International, Australia	W35	Hard	(Australia) Tenika McGiffin	(Chinese Taipei) Lee Ya-hsin (Chinese Taipei) Lin Fang-an	7–6^{(6)}, 4–6, [8–10]
Loss	16–8	Oct 2025	Brisbane QTC Tennis International, Australia	W35	Hard	(Australia) Tenika McGiffin	(New Zealand) Monique Barry (Japan) Natsumi Kawaguchi	5–7, 3–6
Win	17–8	Mar 2026	Launceston Tennis International, Australia	W35	Hard	(Japan) Kyōka Okamura	(Australia) Gabriella Da Silva-Fick (Australia) Tenika McGiffin	5–7, 7–5, [14–12]
Win	18–8	Apr 2026	ITF Miyazaki, Japan	W35	Hard	(Japan) Anri Nagata	(Japan) Misaki Matsuda (Japan) Eri Shimizu	6–4, 7–6^{(7–2)}
Win	19–8	Apr 2026	ITF Miyazaki, Japan	W35	Hard	(Japan) Anri Nagata	(Japan) Ayumi Miyamoto (Japan) Kisa Yoshioka	2–6, 6–3, [10–8]

== Junior Grand Slam finals ==
=== Doubles: 1 (runner-up) ===
Result	Year	Tournament	Surface	Partner	Opponents	Score
Loss	2018	French Open	Clay	(Japan) Yuki Naito	(United States) Caty McNally (Poland) Iga Świątek	2–6, 5–7

== Notes ==
Sporting positions
Preceded by (Serbia) Olga Danilović / (Russia) Anastasia Potapova	Orange Bowl Girls' Doubles Champion; 2017; With: (Chinese Taipei) Joanna Garland	Succeeded by (Hungary) Adrienn Nagy / (South Korea) Park So-hyun
