= Thailand at the 2019 Summer Universiade =

- Flag of Thailand
- IOC code: THA

in Naples, Italy 3 July 2019 – 14 July 2019
- Medals Ranked 33rd: Gold 1 Silver 0 Bronze 4 Total 5

Summer Universiade appearances (overview)
- 1985; 1987; 1989; 1991; 1993; 1995; 1997; 1999; 2001; 2003; 2005; 2007; 2009; 2011; 2013; 2015; 2017; 2019; 2021; 2025; 2027

Thailand competed at the 2019 Summer Universiade in Naples, Italy held from 3 to 14 July 2019. The country won one gold medal and four bronze medals.

== Medal summary ==
=== Medal by sports ===
Medals by sport
Athletics	0	0	1	1
Taekwondo	1	0	2	3
Tennis	0	0	1	1

=== Medalists ===
Medal	Name	Sport	Event	Date
Gold	Panipak Wongpattanakit	Taekwondo	Women's 49 kg	?
Bronze	Sutthisak Singkhon	Athletics	Men's decathlon	July 10
Bronze	Sakuna Laosungnoen; Phenkanya Phaisankiattikun; Ornawee Srisahakit	Taekwondo	Women's Team Poomsae	?
Bronze	Ramnarong Sawekwiharee	Taekwondo	Men's 58 kg	?
Bronze	Chompoothip Jundakate	Tennis	Women's singles	July 13
