= Sri Lanka at the 2019 Summer Universiade =

- IOC code: SRI
- NOC: National Olympic Committee of Sri Lanka
- Website: www.srilankaolympic.org

in Naples July 3-14
- Competitors: 72
- Medals: Gold 0 Silver 0 Bronze 0 Total 0

Summer Universiade appearances
- 1959; 1961; 1963; 1965; 1967; 1970; 1973; 1975; 1977; 1979; 1981; 1983; 1985; 1987; 1989; 1991; 1993; 1995; 1997; 1999; 2001; 2003; 2005; 2007; 2009; 2011; 2013; 2015; 2017; 2019; 2021; 2025; 2027

Sri Lanka participated at the 2019 Summer Universiade which was held in Naples, Italy. Sri Lanka sent a delegation consisting of 72 competitors for the event including 25 track and field athletes.

Sri Lanka didn't win any medal in the multi-sport event.
