= Anastasia Zarycká =

Ukrainian-Czech tennis player (born 1998)

Anastasia Zarycká Анастасія Зарицька
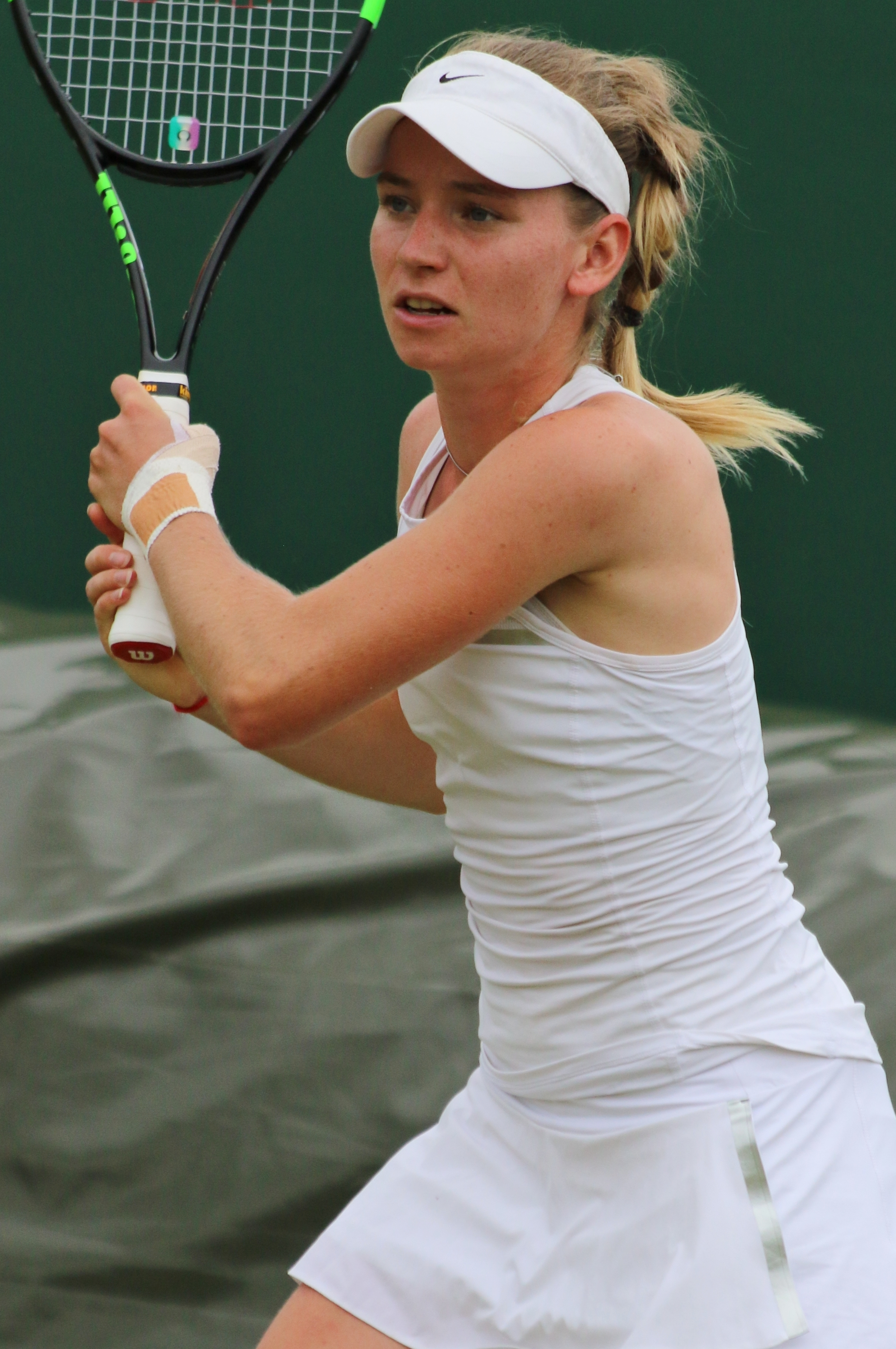
- Zarycká at the 2019 Wimbledon Championships
- Country (sports): Czech Republic (2017–present); Ukraine (2012–2017)
- Born: 8 January 1998 (age 28) Prague
- Plays: Right (two-handed backhand)
- Prize money: $105,784

Singles
- Career record: 159–86
- Career titles: 4 ITF
- Highest ranking: No. 206 (1 July 2019)

Grand Slam singles results
- Australian Open: Q1 (2019)
- Wimbledon: Q1 (2019)
- US Open: Q1 (2019)

Doubles
- Career record: 68–46
- Career titles: 9 ITF
- Highest ranking: No. 189 (25 February 2019)

Anastasia Zarycká (born 8 January 1998 in Prague) is a Ukrainian-Czech former tennis player. Since April 2017, she has been playing for the Czech Republic. Her father is Ukrainian, her mother is Czech.

== Career ==
On the junior tour, Zarycká had a career-high ranking of No. 21, achieved in March 2016. Anastasia reached the final of the 2016 Australian Open girls' doubles competition, alongside Dayana Yastremska.

On the senior tour, she achieved career-high WTA rankings of world No. 206 in singles and 189 in doubles. Zarycká won four singles titles and nine doubles titles on the ITF Circuit.

She made her main-draw debut on the WTA Tour at the 2017 Prague Open where she was handed a wildcard, partnering Tereza Smitková.

Zarycká played her latest professional match on the ITF Circuit in August 2021.

== Personal background ==
She was born in Prague to a Ukrainian father and a Russian mother. In April 2017, she received Czech citizenship. She started playing tennis at the age of nine, since then she has been a member of the TK Sparta Prague.

== ITF Circuit finals ==
=== Singles: 8 (4 titles, 4 runner-ups) ===
Legend $50,000 tournaments $25,000 tournaments $10/15,000 tournaments	Finals by surface Hard (0–1) Clay (3–3) Carpet (1–0)

Result	W–L	Date	Tournament	Tier	Surface	Opponent	Score
Loss	0–1	Jun 2016	ITF Přerov, Czech Republic	10,000	Clay	(Slovakia) Lenka Juríková	2–6, 4–6
Win	1–1	Jul 2016	ITF Pärnu, Estonia	10,000	Clay	(Ukraine) Ganna Poznikhirenko	6–4, 4–6, 6–3
Win	2–1	Oct 2016	Ismaning Open, Germany	10,000	Carpet (i)	(Switzerland) Tess Sugnaux	6–2, 7–6^{(8–6)}
Loss	2–2	Feb 2017	ITF Manacor, Spain	15,000	Clay	(Spain) María Teresa Torró Flor	4–6, 2–6
Loss	2–3	Apr 2017	ITF Dijon, France	15,000	Hard (i)	(France) Audrey Albié	4–6, 6–0, 6–7^{(5–7)}
Win	3–3	Aug 2018	ITF Braunschweig, Germany	25,000	Clay	(Germany) Jule Niemeier	6–1, 6–3
Loss	3–4	Sep 2018	ITF Pula, Italy	25,000	Clay	(Croatia) Tereza Mrdeža	6–2, 5–7, 4–6
Win	4–4	Sep 2018	ITF Pula, Italy	25,000	Clay	(Italy) Martina Caregaro	6–3, 7–6^{(7–4)}

=== Doubles: 12 (9 titles, 3 runner-ups) ===
Legend $50,000 tournaments $25,000 tournaments $10/15,000 tournaments	Finals by surface Hard (1–1) Clay (7–2) Carpet (1–0)

Result	W–L	Date	Tournament	Tier	Surface	Partnering	Opponents	Score
Win	1–0	Jul 2016	ITF Pärnu, Estonia	10,000	Clay	(United Kingdom) Emily Arbuthnott	(Russia) Ekaterina Kazionova (Latvia) Denīza Marcinkēviča	6–4, 7–5
Win	2–0	Dec 2016	ITF Cordenons, Italy	10,000	Carpet (i)	(Romania) Laura Ioana Andrei	(Switzerland) Nina Stadler (Germany) Caroline Werner	6–0, 7–6^{(3)}
Loss	2–1	Apr 2017	ITF Dijon, France	15,000	Hard (I)	(France) Victoria Muntean	(Latvia) Diāna Marcinkēviča (Switzerland) Rebeka Masarova	4–6, 3–6
Win	3–1	Jun 2017	Macha Lake Open, Czech Republic	25,000	Clay	(Romania) Laura Ioana Andrei	(Germany) Tayisiya Morderger (Germany) Yana Morderger	6–3, 6–4
Win	4–1	Jul 2017	ITF Darmstadt, Germany	25,000	Clay	(Romania) Laura Ioana Andrei	(Egypt) Sandra Samir (Liechtenstein) Kathinka von Deichmann	4–6, 7–6^{(5)}, [10–3]
Loss	4–2	Mar 2018	ITF Pula, Italy	25,000	Clay	(Italy) Anastasia Grymalska	(Russia) Valentina Ivakhnenko (Russia) Valeriya Solovyeva	3–6, 6–3, [5–10]
Win	5–2	Jun 2018	Macha Lake Open, Czech Republic (2)	25,000	Clay	(Russia) Maria Marfutina	(Czech Republic) Johana Marková (Germany) Sarah-Rebecca Sekulic	5–7, 6–1, [10–8]
Win	6–2	Jun 2018	ITF Padua, Italy	25,000	Clay	(Turkey) İpek Soylu	(Bosnia and Herzegovina) Dea Herdželaš (Croatia) Tereza Mrdeža	6–4, 6–1
Win	7–2	Aug 2018	ITF Braunschweig, Germany	25,000	Clay	(Germany) Julia Wachaczyk	(Sweden) Cornelia Lister (Latvia) Diāna Marcinkēviča	6–4, 3–6, [11–9]
Win	8–2	Oct 2018	ITF Pula, Italy	25,000	Clay	(Russia) Valentina Ivakhnenko	(Romania) Cristina Dinu (Italy) Camilla Rosatello	6–2, 6–4
Win	9–2	Feb 2019	Trnava Indoor, Slovakia	25,000	Hard (i)	(Romania) Laura Ioana Paar	(Poland) Maja Chwalińska (Czech Republic) Miriam Kolodziejová	6–4, 6–3
Loss	9–3	Jun 2019	Bredeney Ladies Open, Germany	25,000	Clay	(Ukraine) Alena Fomina	(North Macedonia) Lina Gjorcheska (Russia) Anastasiya Komardina	3–6, 3–6
