= South Korea at the 2019 Summer Universiade =

- Flag of South Korea
- IOC code: KOR

in Naples, Italy 3 July 2019 – 14 July 2019
- Medals Ranked 5th: Gold 17 Silver 17 Bronze 16 Total 50

Summer Universiade appearances (overview)
- 1959; 1961; 1963; 1965; 1967; 1970; 1973; 1975; 1977; 1979; 1981; 1983; 1985; 1987; 1989; 1991; 1993; 1995; 1997; 1999; 2001; 2003; 2005; 2007; 2009; 2011; 2013; 2015; 2017; 2019; 2021; 2025; 2027

South Korea competed at the 2019 Summer Universiade in Naples, Italy, held from 3 to 14 July 2019.

== Medal summary ==
=== Medal by sports ===
Medals by sport
Archery	4	2	2	8
Athletics	0	1	1	2
Diving	0	2	3	5
Fencing	3	1	3	7
Gymnastics	1	0	0	1
Judo	1	4	3	8
Shooting	1	3	1	5
Swimming	0	0	1	1
Taekwondo	7	3	2	12
Tennis	0	1	0	1

=== Medalists ===
Medal	Name	Sport	Event
Gold	Lee Woo-seok	Archery	Men's individual recurve
Gold	Kang Chae-young	Archery	Women's individual recurve
Gold	Choi Mi-sun; Kang Chae-young	Archery	Women's team
Gold	Kim Yun-hee; So Chae-won	Archery	Women's team compound
Gold	Oh Sang-uk	Fencing	Men's Individual sabre
Gold	Jang Hyo-min; Jang Min-hyeok; Lee Seung-hyun; Seo Jung-min	Fencing	Men's Team épée
Gold	Choi Min-seo; Jeong Han-gil; Jung Jae-seung; Oh Sang-uk	Fencing	Men's Team sabre
Gold	Kim Han-sol	Gymnastics	Men's vault
Gold	Han Mi-jin	Judo	Women's +70 kg
Gold	Park Dae-hun	Shooting	Men's 10 metre air pistol
Gold	Kang Min-woo	Taekwondo	Men's -80 kg
Gold	Park In-ho	Taekwondo	Men's -87 kg
Gold	Kang Wan-jin	Taekwondo	Men's Individual Poomsae
Gold	Kang Wan-jin; Oh Chang-hyun; Park Kwang-ho	Taekwondo	Men's Team Poomsae
Gold	Kim Yu-jin	Taekwondo	Women's -57 kg
Gold	Hwang Ye-bin; Jeong Seung-yeon; Yun Ji-hye	Taekwondo	Women's Team Poomsae
Gold	Oh Chang-hyun; Hwang Ye-bin	Taekwondo	Mixed Team Poomsae
Silver	Choi Mi-sun	Archery	Women's individual recurve
(silver) Silver	So Chae-won	Archery	Women's individual recurve
Silver	Joo Hyun-myeong; Kim Min-gyuu; Kim Nak-hyun	Athletics	Men's 20 kilometres walk team
Silver	Yi Jae-gyeong	Diving	Men's 3 metre springboard
Silver	Cho Eun-bi	Diving	Women's 10 metre platform
Silver	Jang Hyo-min; Seo Jung-min; Seo Myeong-cheol	Fencing	Men's Team foil
Silver	Lee Moon-jin	Judo	Men's -81 kg
Silver	Kang Heon-cheol; Kim Min-jong; Lee Moon-jin; Kim Tae-ho; Shin Ho	Judo	Men's team
Silver	Park Da-sol	Judo	Women's -52 kg
Silver	Han Mi-jin	Judo	Women's Open weight
Silver	Park Ha-jun	Shooting	Men's 10 metre air rifle
Silver	Nam Tae-yun; Seo Ji-woo	Shooting	Mixed metre air rifle
Silver	Park Dae-hun; Kim Min-jung	Shooting	Mixed metre air rifle
Silver	Ha Min-ah	Taekwondo	Women's -53 kg
Silver	Yoon Do-hee	Taekwondo	Women's -73 kg
Silver	Ha Min-ah; Jo Hee-kyeong; Kim Yu-jin; Yoon Do-hee	Taekwondo	Women's Team Kyorugi
Silver	Hong Seong-chan; Shin San-hui	Tennis	Men's doubles
Bronze	Kim Jong-ho	Archery	Men's individual compound
Bronze	Kim Jong-ho; So Chae-won	Archery	Mixed team compound
Bronze	Lee Gyu-hyeong; Ko Seung-hwan; Mo Il-hwan; Park Sie-young	Athletics	Men's 4 × 100 metres
Bronze	Cho Eun-bi; Moon Na-yun	Diving	Women's Synchronized 10 metre platform
Bronze	South Korea	Diving	Women's team classification
Bronze	Yi Jae-gyeong; Cho Eun-bi	Diving	Mixed team
Bronze	Jang Hyo-min	Fencing	Men's Individual épée
Bronze	Jeon Su-in	Fencing	Women's Individual sabre
Bronze	Hong Ha-eun; Jeon Su-in; Kim Jeong-mi; Ko Chae-yeong	Fencing	Women's Team sabre
Bronze	Kim Min-jong	Judo	Men's +90 kg
Bronze	Kim Ji-su	Judo	Women's -57 kg
Bronze	Han Hee-ju; Han Mi-jin; Kim Ji-su; Lee Ye-won; Park Da-sol	Judo	Women's team
Bronze	Kim Min-jung	Shooting	Women's 10 metre air pistol
Bronze	Jeong So-eun	Swimming	Women's 50 m butterfly
Bronze	Kim Kyung-deok	Taekwondo	Men's -68 kg
Bronze	Yun Ji-hye	Taekwondo	Women's Individual Poomsae
