= France at the 2019 Summer Universiade =

- Flag of France
- IOC code: FRA

in Naples, Italy 3 July 2019 – 14 July 2019
- Medals Ranked 16th: Gold 3 Silver 9 Bronze 11 Total 23

Summer Universiade appearances
- 1959; 1961; 1963; 1965; 1967; 1970; 1973; 1975; 1977; 1979; 1981; 1983; 1985; 1987; 1989; 1991; 1993; 1995; 1997; 1999; 2001; 2003; 2005; 2007; 2009; 2011; 2013; 2015; 2017; 2019; 2021; 2025; 2027

France competed at the 2019 Summer Universiade in Naples, Italy held from 3 to 14 July 2019.

== Medal summary ==
=== Medal by sports ===
Medals by sport
Athletics	0	3	2	5
Fencing	2	2	3	7
Judo	0	2	0	2
Rugby sevens	0	1	1	2
Swimming	0	1	0	1
Table tennis	0	0	1	1
Taekwondo	1	0	2	3
Tennis	0	0	2	2

=== Medalists ===
Medal	Name	Sport	Event	Date
Gold	Alexandra Louis-Marie	Fencing	Women's épée	4 July
Gold	Sara Balzer	Fencing	Women's sabre	6 July
Silver	Yohann N'Doye Brouard	Swimming	Men's 100 metre backstroke	5 July
Silver	Wilhem Belocian	Athletics	Men's 110 metres hurdles	12 July
Silver	Yann Randrianasolo	Athletics	Men's long jump	13 July
Silver	Yann Schrub	Athletics	Men's 5000 metres	13 July
Bronze	Amandine Brossier	Athletics	Women's 400 metres	10 July
Bronze	Coralie Comte	Athletics	Women's 100 metres hurdles	11 July

== Competitors ==
The following is a list of the number of competitors who participated in the Universiade.

Sport	Men	Women	Total	Ref.
Archery	4	2	6	
Athletics	8	8	16	
Diving				
Fencing				
Football		—		
Gymnastics				
Judo				
Rugby sevens				
Sailing				
Shooting				
Swimming				
Table tennis				
Taekwondo				
Tennis				
Volleyball				
Water polo				
Total				

== Archery ==
Men

Athlete	Event	Ranking round		Round of 64	Round of 32	Round of 16	Quarterfinals	Semifinals	Final / BM	
Athlete	Event	Score	Seed	Opposition Score	Opposition Score	Opposition Score	Opposition Score	Opposition Score	Opposition Score	Rank
Yann Damour	Individual compound									
Ferdinand Delille	Individual recurve									
Camille Dufour	Individual compound									
Lou Thirion	Individual recurve									
Yann Damour; Camille Dufour	Team compound									
Ferdinand Delille; Lou Thirion	Team recurve									

Women

Athlete	Event	Ranking round		Round of 64	Round of 32	Round of 16	Quarterfinals	Semifinals	Final / BM	
Athlete	Event	Score	Seed	Opposition Score	Opposition Score	Opposition Score	Opposition Score	Opposition Score	Opposition Score	Rank
Lola Grandjean	Individual compound									
Clémence Tellier	Individual recurve									

Mixed team

Athlete	Event	Ranking round		Round of 16	Quarterfinals	Semifinals	Final / BM	
Athlete	Event	Score	Seed	Opposition Score	Opposition Score	Opposition Score	Opposition Score	Rank
Camille Dufour; Lola Grandjean	Compound							
Clémence Tellier; Lou Thirion	Recurve							

== Athletics ==
France qualified 16 athletics for the Athletics events at the 2019 Summer Universiade including 8 men and 8 women.

Key

- Note–Ranks given for track events are within the athlete's heat only
- Q = Qualified for the next round
- q = Qualified for the next round as a fastest loser or, in field events, by position without achieving the qualifying target
- NR = National record
- SB = Season best
- PB = Personal best
- N/A = Round not applicable for the event
- Bye = Athlete not required to compete in round

Track & road events
Men

Athlete	Event	Heat		Semifinal		Final	
Athlete	Event	Result	Rank	Result	Rank	Result	Rank
Wilhem Belocian	110 m hurdles	13.57	1 Q	13.47	1 Q	13.30 SB	2nd place, silver medalist(s)
Krilan Le Bihan	Half marathon	N/A				1:10:28	19
Aymeric Lusine	800 m	1:49.99	2 Q	1:48.02	2 Q	DQ	—
Ludovic Payen	110 m hurdles	14.06	3 Q	13.71	3 Q	13.57	5
Yann Schrub	5000 m	14:20.42	2 Q	N/A		14:03.24	2nd place, silver medalist(s)

Women

Athlete	Event	Heat		Semifinal		Final	
Athlete	Event	Result	Rank	Result	Rank	Result	Rank
Stella Akakpo	100 m	11.60	1 Q	11.72	4	did not advance	
Amandine Brossier	400 m	53.12	2 Q	52.17	4 q	51.77 PB	3rd place, bronze medalist(s)
Coralie Comte	100 m hurdles	13.41	1 Q	13.24	2 Q	13.09 PB	3rd place, bronze medalist(s)
Charlotte Mouchet	800 m	2:08.05	3 Q	2:07.95	6	did not advance	

Field events
Men

Athlete	Event	Qualification		Final	
Athlete	Event	Distance	Position	Distance	Position
Augustin Bey	Long Jump	7.34	24	did not advance	
Mathieu Collet	Pole vault	5.25	= 1 q	5.21	= 7
Yann Randrianasolo	Long Jump	7.71	5 q	7.95	2nd place, silver medalist(s)

Women

Athlete	Event	Qualification		Final	
Athlete	Event	Distance	Position	Distance	Position
Charlotte Gaudy	Pole vault	4.00	= 9 q	4.11	10
Mallaury Sautereau	Pole vault	4.00	= 6 q	4.31	8
Rougui Sow	Long jump	6.30	6 q	6.21	10

Combined events – Women's heptathlon

Athlete	Event	100H	HJ	SP	200 m	LJ	JT	800 m	Final	Rank
Diane Marie-Hardy	Result	14.23	1.59	12.48	25.13	NM	DNS	—	DNF	—
Diane Marie-Hardy	Points	946	724	693	875	0	0	—	DNF	—

== Swimming ==
Men

Athlete	Event	Heat		Semifinal		Final	
Athlete	Event	Time	Rank	Time	Rank	Time	Rank
Théo Bussière	50 m breaststroke	27.98	15 Q	27.67	7 Q	27.60	8
Théo Bussière	100 m breaststroke	1:00.66	7 Q	1:00.18	7 Q	1:00.89	8
Alexandre Derache	100 m freestyle	50.38	21	did not advance			
Roman Fuchs	100 m freestyle	51.27	36	did not advance			
Samy Helmbacher	200 m individual medley	2:01.15	8 Q	2:00.43	5 Q	2:00.70	5
Samy Helmbacher	400 m individual medley	4:24.43	21	—N/a		did not advance	
Pierre Henry-Arrenous	100 m butterfly	53.56	15 Q	53.53	14	did not advance	
Stanislas Huille	50 m backstroke	25.54	12 Q	25.40	11	did not advance	
Stanislas Huille	100 m backstroke	55.30	13 Q	55.21	14	did not advance	
Geoffroy Mathieu	200 m backstroke	1:59.36	6 Q	1:58.81	8 Q	1:59.28	6
Remi Meresse	200 m freestyle	1:49.77	7 Q	1:49.23	9	did not advance	
Yohann N'Doye Brouard	50 m backstroke	25.55	13 Q	25.61	14	did not advance	
Yohann N'Doye Brouard	100 m backstroke	54.56	4 Q	54.38	5 Q	53.80	2nd place, silver medalist(s)
Jordan Pothain	200 m freestyle	1:50.16	13 Q	1:48.67	7 Q	1:48.79	7
Roman Fuchs; Jordan Pothain; Remi Meresse; Alexandre Derache	4 × 200 m freestyle relay	7:16.34	2 Q	—N/a		7:15.28	5
Yohann N'Doye Brouard; Théo Bussière; Pierre Henry-Arrenous; Jordan Pothain; Stanislas Huille (heat)	4 × 100 m medley relay	3:36.67	3 Q	—N/a		3:36.61	6

Women

Athlete	Event	Heat		Semifinal		Final	
Athlete	Event	Time	Rank	Time	Rank	Time	Rank
Cyrielle Duhamel	50 m butterfly	27.62	25	did not advance			
Cyrielle Duhamel	200 m individual medley	2:15.45	8 Q	2:15.62	11	did not advance	
