= Russia at the 2019 Summer Universiade =

- IOC code: RUS
- NOC: Russian Olympic Committee

in Naples, Italy 3 – 14 July 2019
- Competitors: 275 in 17 sports
- Flag bearer: Kirill Prigoda (opening)
- Medals Ranked 2nd: Gold 22 Silver 24 Bronze 36 Total 82

Summer Universiade appearances (overview)
- 1993; 1995; 1997; 1999; 2001; 2003; 2005; 2007; 2009; 2011; 2013; 2015; 2017; 2019; 2021; 2025; 2027

Russia competed at the 2019 Summer Universiade in Naples, Italy from 2 to 14 July 2019. A total of 275 sportsmen competed in 17 sports.

== Medalists ==
Medal	Name	Sport	Event	Date
Gold	Ruslan Shakhbazov	Judo	Men's light heavyweight	4 July
Gold	Grigoriy Tarasevich	Swimming	Men's 100 metre backstroke	5 July
Gold	Evgeny Prokopchuk	Judo	Men's lightweight	5 July
Gold	Kirill Prokopev	Gymnastics	Men's floor	7 July
Gold	Anna Koroleva; Daria Martynyuk; Maria Obraztsova; Evgeniya Zharkova	Fencing	Women's team épée	7 July
Gold	Abas Azizov; Ismail Chasygov; Roman Dontsov; Evgeny Prokopchuk; Ruslan Shakhbazov	Judo	Men's team	7 July
Gold	Kirill Prigoda	Swimming	Men's 200 metre breaststroke	7 July
Gold	Aleksandr Kudashev	Swimming	Men's 200 metre butterfly	7 July
Gold	Anton Nikitin	Swimming	Men's 800 metre freestyle	8 July
Gold	Egor Kuimov	Swimming	Men's 100 metre butterfly	9 July
Gold	Kirill Prigoda	Swimming	Men's 50 metre breaststroke	9 July
Gold	Anton Bulaev	Archery	Men's individual compound	12 July
Gold	Ekaterina Selezneva	Gymnastics	Women's rhythmic individual all-around	12 July
Gold	Alina Alieva; Elina Baruzdina; Marina Kozlova; Valeriia Rusina; Angelina Shkatova	Gymnastics	Women's rhythmic group all-around	12 July
Gold	Ekaterina Evdokimova; Kristina Kurnosova; Anna Lazareva; Elena Novik; Viktroriia Russu; Daria Ryseva; Kseniia Smirnova; Angelina Sperskaite; Anastasia Stalnaya; Maria Vorobyeva; Valeriya Zaytseva; Olga Zubareva	Volleyball	Women's tournament	12 July
Gold	Erdem Tsydypov; Beligto Tsynguev	Archery	Men's team recurve	13 July
Gold	Ekaterina Selezneva	Gymnastics	Women's rhythmic individual hoop	13 July
Gold	Ekaterina Selezneva	Gymnastics	Women's rhythmic individual ball	13 July
Gold	Alina Alieva; Elina Baruzdina; Marina Kozlova; Valeriia Rusina; Angelina Shkatova	Gymnastics	Women's rhythmic group 5 balls	13 July
Gold	Ekaterina Selezneva	Gymnastics	Women's rhythmic individual ribbon	13 July
Gold	Alina Alieva; Elina Baruzdina; Marina Kozlova; Valeriia Rusina; Angelina Shkatova	Gymnastics	Women's rhythmic group 3 hoops + 4 clubs	13 July
Gold	Yana Sizikova; Ivan Gakhov	Tennis	Mixed doubles	13 July
Silver	Madina Taimazova	Judo	Women's middleweight	4 July
Silver	Evgeniya Zharkova	Fencing	Women's épée	4 July
Silver	Egor Lapin; Evgeniia Selezneva	Diving	Mixed synchronized 3 metre springboard	5 July
Silver	Kirill Prigoda	Swimming	Men's 100 metre breaststroke	5 July
Silver	Dmitriy Gusev	Fencing	Men's épée	5 July
Silver	Lilia Akhaimova; Tatiana Nabieva; Ulyana Perebinosova	Gymnastics	Women's artistic team all-around	5 July
Silver	Ilia Molchanov; Nikita Nikolaev	Diving	Men's synchronized 3 metre springboard	6 July
Silver	Ivan Stretovich	Gymnastics	Men's artistic individual all-around	6 July
Silver	Nikolay Snegirev	Swimming	Men's 200 metre freestyle	6 July
Silver	Ulyana Perebinosova	Gymnastics	Women's artistic individual all-around	6 July
Silver	Lilia Akhaimova	Gymnastics	Women's vault	7 July
Silver	Tatiana Nabieva	Gymnastics	Women's uneven bars	7 July
Silver	Ivan Stretovich	Gymnastics	Men's parallel bars	7 July
Silver	Kamila Badurova; Daria Bobrikova; Natalia Golomidova; Anna Gushchina; Madina Taimazova	Judo	Women's team	7 July
Silver	Ilia Khomenko	Swimming	Men's 200 metre breaststroke	7 July
Silver	Alan Fardzinov; Dmitriy Gusev; Dmitrii Shvelidze; Artem Tselyshev	Fencing	Men's épée	8 July
Silver	Olga Batenina; Oksana Martines Hauregi; Daria Martynyuk; Maria Melnikova	Fencing	Women's foil	8 July
Silver	Irina Prikhodko	Swimming	Women's 800 metre freestyle	9 July
Silver	Grigoriy Tarasevich	Swimming	Men's 200 metre backstroke	9 July
Silver	Ilia Khomenko; Egor Kuimov; Ivan Kuzmenko; Mark Nikolaev; Kirill Prigoda; Aleksandr Sadovnikov; Grigoriy Tarasevich	Swimming	Men's 4 × 100 m medley relay	10 July
Silver	Yulia Turutina	Taekwondo	Women's 62 kg	11 July
Silver	Svetlana Gomboeva; Valeria Mylnikova	Archery	Women's team recurve	13 July
Silver	Erdem Tsydypov	Archery	Men's individual recurve	13 July
Silver	Ivan Gakhov; Timur Kiyamov	Tennis	Men's team classification	13 July
Bronze	Anton Nikitin	Swimming	Men's 400 metre freestyle	4 July
Bronze	Ilia Molchanov	Diving	Men's 3 metre springboard	4 July
Bronze	Anna Gushchina	Judo		4 July
Bronze	Ilya Kibartas; Ivan Stretovich; Kirill Prokopev	Gymnastics	Men's artistic team all-around	4 July
Bronze	Natalia Golomidova	Judo	Women's lightweight	5 July
Bronze	Kamila Badurova	Judo	Women's welterweight	5 July
Bronze	Karina Shkliar	Diving	Women's 3 metre springboard	6 July
Bronze	Evgenii Panchenko	Shooting	Men's 10 metre air rifle	6 July
Bronze	Daria Bobrikova	Judo	Women's featherweight	6 July
Bronze	Ismail Chasygov	Judo	Men's featherweight	6 July
Bronze	Lilia Akhaimova	Gymnastics	Women's artistic individual all-around	6 July
Bronze	Ekaterina Cherniavskaia; Mariia Malanina; Yana Noskova; Valeria Shcherbatykh	Table tennis	Women's team	6 July
Bronze	Tatiana Nabieva	Gymnastics	Women's vault	7 July
Bronze	Ilia Smirnov; Daria Selvanovskaia	Diving	10 m synchronized platform	7 July
Bronze	Ulyana Perebinosova	Gymnastics	Women's balance beam	7 July
Bronze	Alina Arterchuk; Alena Dammer; Iana Danilova; Diana Glushenko; Snezhanna Kulkova; Diana Loginova; Daria Lushina; Ekaterina Mikhaleva; Mariia Molokoedova; Daria Noritsina; Kseniia Pozdeeva; Evgeniia Steblinskaia	Rugby sevens	Women's tournament	7 July
Bronze	Ulyana Perebinosova	Gymnastics	Women's floor	7 July
Bronze	Ivan Stretovich	Gymnastics	Men's horizontal bar	7 July
Bronze	Grigoriy Tarasevich	Swimming	Men's 50 metre backstroke	7 July
Bronze	Mariya Baklakova; Vasilissa Buinaia; Aleksandra Denisenko; Elizaveta Klevanovich; Irina Krivonogova; Anastasiia Osipenko; Irina Prikhodko; Ksenia Vasilenok	Swimming	Women's 4 x 200 metre freestyle relay	7 July
Bronze	Evgenii Panchenko; Maria Ivanova	Shooting	Mixed team 10 metre air rifle	8 July
Bronze	Aleksandr Belevtsev; Egor Lapin; Ilia Molchanov; Nikita Nikolaev; Ilia Smirnov; German Stroev; Igor Vnukov	Diving	Men's team classification	8 July
Bronze	Sadi Ismailov; Yana Noskova	Table tennis	Mixed's doubles	8 July
Bronze	Iskander Akhmetov; Alan Fardzinov; Askar Khamzin; Grigoriy Semenyuk	Fencing	Men's foil	9 July
Bronze	Mariya Baklakova	Swimming	Women's 200 metre freestyle	9 July
Bronze	Yana Noskova; Valeria Shcherbatykh	Table tennis	Women's doubles	10 July
Bronze	Daniil Markov	Swimming	Men's 50 metre freestyle	10 July
Bronze	Maxim Stupin	Swimming	Men's 400 metre individual medley	10 July
Bronze	Sadi Ismailov	Table tennis	Men's singles	11 July
Bronze	Ivan Gakhov	Tennis	Men's singles	12 July
Bronze	Rafael Kamalov	Taekwondo	Men's 87 kg	12 July
Bronze	Iuliia Anisimova; Daniela Basaeva; Kristina Cherkasova; Anna Desiatnik; Viktoriia Dubova; Nasiba Gasanova; Kristina Khorosheva; Iana Khotyreva; Viktoriia Kozlova; Diana Kuzmina; Angelina Lazutova; Polina Organova; Ksenia Shakhova; Tatyana Shcherbak; Elena Shesterneva; Sofiia Shishkina; Viktoriya Shkoda; Anna Sinko; Natalia Sokolova; Natalia Stanovova	Football	Women's tournament	12 July
Bronze	Ekaterina Selezneva	Gymnastics	Women's rhythmic individual clubs	13 July
Bronze	Maksim Belogortsev; Denis Bogdan; Kirill Klets; Aleksei Kononov; Semen Krivitchenko; Aleksandr Melnikov; Roman Pakshin; Pavel Pankov; Roman Poroshin; Andrey Surmachevskiy; Kirill Ursov; Dmitry Yakovlev	Volleyball	Men's tournament	13 July
Bronze	Daria Chagochkina; Regina Galimzianova; Anastasiia Diachenko; Alina Inogamova; Polina Kempf; Diana Khamraeva; Anastasia Leonova; Nadezhda Lipskaia; Liubov Mekhteleva; Polina Popova; Margarita Pystina; Svetlana Stepakhina; Elizaveta Zaplatina	Water polo	Women's tournament	13 July
Bronze	Victoria Kan; Yana Sizikova	Tennis	Women's team classification	13 July

Medals by sport
Sport	1st place, gold medalist(s)	2nd place, silver medalist(s)	3rd place, bronze medalist(s)	Total
Gymnastics	8	6	7	21
Swimming	6	6	6	18
Judo	3	2	5	10
Archery	2	2	0	4
Fencing	1	4	1	6
Tennis	1	1	2	4
Volleyball	1	0	1	2
Diving	0	2	4	6
Taekwondo	0	1	1	2
Table tennis	0	0	4	4
Shooting	0	0	2	2
Football	0	0	1	1
Rugby sevens	0	0	1	1
Water polo	0	0	1	1
Total	22	24	36	82

Medals by date
Day	Date	1st place, gold medalist(s)	2nd place, silver medalist(s)	3rd place, bronze medalist(s)	Total
Day 1	4 July	1	2	4	7
Day 2	5 July	2	4	2	8
Day 3	6 July	0	4	6	10
Day 4	7 July	5	5	8	18
Day 5	8 July	1	2	3	6
Day 6	9 July	2	2	2	6
Day 7	10 July	0	1	3	4
Day 8	11 July	0	1	2	3
Day 9	12 July	4	0	2	6
Day 10	13 July	7	3	4	14
Day 11	14 July	0	0	0	0
Total		22	24	36	82

== Competitors ==
Sport	Men	Women	Total
Archery	4	4	8
Basketball	12	12	24
Diving	7	7	14
Fencing	9	9	18
Football	20	20	40
Gymnastics	3	9	12
Judo	5	5	10
Rugby sevens	12	12	24
Sailing	2	2	4
Shooting	5	5	10
Swimming	18	13	31
Table tennis	4	4	8
Taekwondo	9	9	18
Tennis	2	2	4
Volleyball	12	12	24
Water polo	13	13	26
Total	137	138	275

== Archery ==
Recurve

Athlete	Event	Ranking round		1/48 finals	1/24 finals	1/16 finals	1/8 finals	Quarterfinals	Semifinals	Final / BM	
Athlete	Event	Score	Seed	Opposition Score	Opposition Score	Opposition Score	Opposition Score	Opposition Score	Opposition Score	Opposition Score	Rank
Erdem Tsydypov	Men's individual	666	2	Bye		Kozhokar (UKR); W 7–3	Basiuras (POL); W 7–1	Qi (CHN); W 6–0	Ishii (JPN); W 6–4	Lee (KOR); L 2–6	2nd place, silver medalist(s)
Beligto Tsynguev	Men's individual	639	21	Bye	Hurban (SVK); W 6–0	Tang (TPE); W 6–2	Wei (TPE); L 0–6	Did not advance			
Erdem Tsydypov; Beligto Tsynguev	Men's team	1305	5 Q	—N/a			Croatia (CRO); W 5–3	Japan (JPN); W 5–1	Switzerland (SUI); W 5–3	Chinese Taipei (TPE); W 5–1	1st place, gold medalist(s)
Svetlana Gomboeva	Women's individual	581	7	—N/a	Bye	Yeh (TPE); L 2–6	Did not advance				
Valeria Mylnikova	Women's individual	587	6	—N/a	Bye	Martín (ESP); W 6–0	Khochyna (UKR); W 6–0	Yamauchi (JPN); W 6–0	Choi (KOR); L 0–6	Peng (TPE); L 2–6	4
Svetlana Gomboeva; Valeria Mylnikova	Women's team	1168	2 Q	—N/a			Slovenia (SLO); W 5–3	Mexico (MEX); W 5–4	Switzerland (SUI); W 6–0	South Korea (KOR); L 1–5	2nd place, silver medalist(s)
Erdem Tsydypov; Valeria Mylnikova	Mixed team	1253	4	—N/a		Bye	Spain (ESP); L 1–5	Did not advance			

Compound

Athlete	Event	Ranking round		1/24 finals	1/16 finals	1/8 finals	Quarterfinals	Semifinals	Final / BM	
Athlete	Event	Score	Seed	Opposition Score	Opposition Score	Opposition Score	Opposition Score	Opposition Score	Opposition Score	Rank
Anton Bulaev	Men's individual	695	19	Neo (SGP); W 142–137	Leonard (AUS); W 146–137	Palizban (IRI); W 147–146	Becerra (MEX); W 145–144	Przybylski (POL); W 148–146	Yetim (TUR); W 147^{10*}–147^{10}	1st place, gold medalist(s)
Asim Pavlov	Men's individual	690	25	Cerezo (ESP); W 141–138	Chen (TPE); L 143–148	Did not advance				
Anton Bulaev; Asim Pavlov	Men's team	1385	11	—N/a		United States (USA); L 147–150	Did not advance			
Elizaveta Knyazeva	Women's individual	681	11	Bye	Loh (SGP); W 140^{9*}–140^{9}	Kim (KOR); W 143–137	So (KOR); L 137–148	Did not advance		
Alexandra Savenkova	Women's individual	683	10	Bye	Grilli (ITA); L 140^{9}–140^{9*}	Did not advance				
Elizaveta Knyazeva; Alexandra Savenkova	Women's team	1364	6	—N/a		Iran (IRI); W 149–148	Mexico (MEX); W 151–149	Turkey (TUR); L 153–154	Chinese Taipei (TPE); L 149–154	4
Anton Bulaev; Alexandra Savenkova	Mixed team	1378	8	—N/a	Bye	India (IND); L 152–154	Did not advance			

== Basketball ==
Summary

Team	Event	Group stage				Quarterfinals / PM	Semifinals / PM	Final / BM / PM	
Team	Event	Opposition Score	Opposition Score	Opposition Score	Rank	Opposition Score	Opposition Score	Opposition Score	Rank
Russia men's	Men's tournament	Croatia; L 54–58	Argentina; W 84–80	Latvia; L 55–68	4	Czech Republic; L 73–91	Norway; W 63–55	China; W 91–76	13
Russia women's	Women's tournament	Romania; W 59–31	Argentina; W 70–56	Portugal; L 54–75	2 Q	Japan; L 83–89	China; W 73–64	Chinese Taipei; W 74–58	5

=== Men's tournament ===
Group stage

Pos	Team	Pld	W	L	PF	PA	PD	Pts	Qualification
1	Argentina	3	2	1	217	193	+24	5	Quarterfinals
2	Latvia	3	2	1	197	195	+2	5	Quarterfinals
3	Croatia	3	1	2	181	194	−13	4	9–16th place quarterfinals
4	Russia	3	1	2	193	206	−13	4	9–16th place quarterfinals

Source: Napoli 2019

4 July 2019
20:00 UTC+2

Boxscore

Croatia	58–54	Russia
Scoring by quarter: 15–10, 14–16, 8–16, 21–12
Pts: Škara 17; Rebs: Čolak, Jambrović 7 Asts: Rebić 4		Pts: Motovilov 13; Rebs: Doinikov 10; Asts: Motovilov, Pluzhnikov 2

PalaCercola
Referees: Paulo Marques (POR), Trevor Barss (CAN), Petr Hrůša (CZE)

5 July 2019
13:00 UTC+2

Boxscore

Argentina	80–84	Russia
Scoring by quarter: 24–30, 15–21, 21–19, 20–14
Pts: Vaulet 20; Rebs: Vaulet 8 Asts: Buemo 6		Pts: Afanasev 23; Rebs: Trubin 7 Asts: Pluzhnikov 3

Palasport Del Mauro
Referees: Grant Todey (USA), Zulfikar Oruzgani (GER), Péter Praksch (HUN)

6 July 2019
17:30 UTC+2

Boxscore

Russia	55–68	Latvia
Scoring by quarter: 21–17, 19–14, 9–22, 6–15
Pts: Aginskikh 12; Rebs: Motovilov 5 Asts: Doinikov 6		Pts: Feikners 14; Rebs: Čavars 11; Asts: Birkāns 6

PalaBarbuto
Referees: Pavel Fuska (SVK), Nir Meirson (ISR), Alberto Achutegui (MEX)

9–16th place quarterfinal

8 July 2019
10:30 UTC+2

Boxscore

Czech Republic	91–73	Russia
Scoring by quarter: 17–17, 27–23, 23–16, 24–17
Pts: Peterka 18; Rebs: Peterka 14; Asts: Peterka, Tuma 4		Pts: Doinikov, Motovilov 17; Rebs: Doinikov 9 Asts: Motovilov 6

PalaBarbuto
Referees: Leonardo Zalazar (ARG), Zulfikar Oruzgani (GER), Nikola Bejat (NOR)

13–16th place semifinal

9 July 2019
17:30 UTC+2

Boxscore

Russia	63–55	Norway
Scoring by quarter: 13–12, 16–17, 15–10, 19–16
Pts: Motovilov, Pluzhnikov 14; Rebs: Doinikov 8 Asts: five players 2		Pts: Lorange 12; Rebs: Dyb Berg 9 Asts: Frey 9

PalaBarbuto
Referees: Nir Meirson (ISR), Pavel Fuska (SVK), Mora Gaitan (MEX)

13th place game

11 July 2019
10:30 UTC+2

Boxscore

Russia	91–76	China
Scoring by quarter: 25–14, 15–25, 24–21, 27–16
Pts: Doinikov 25; Rebs: Aginskikh 7 Asts: Grekov, Sarattsev 3		Pts: Zhang 21; Rebs: Zhang 9 Asts: Yuan 5

PalaJacazzi
Referees: Jon Chapman (AUS), Alberto Achutegui (MEX), Micaela Prado (ARG)

=== Women's tournament ===
Group stage

Pos	Team	Pld	W	L	PF	PA	PD	Pts	Qualification
1	Portugal	3	3	0	208	136	+72	6	Quarterfinals
2	Russia	3	2	1	183	162	+21	5	Quarterfinals
3	Romania	3	1	2	116	165	−49	4	9–16th place quarterfinals
4	Argentina	3	0	3	143	187	−44	3	9–16th place quarterfinals

Source: Napoli 2019

3 July 2019
13:00 UTC+2

Boxscore

Romania	31–59	Russia
Scoring by quarter: 10–16, 4–20, 12–8, 5–15
Pts: Podar 10; Rebs: Virjoghe 8 Asts: Ferariu 2		Pts: Kolosovskaya 19; Rebs: Fedorova 13; Asts: Burovaya 4

PalaBarbuto
Referees: Grant Todey (USA), Valerio Grigioni (ITA), Gatis Saliņš (LAT)

4 July 2019
20:00 UTC+2

Boxscore

Argentina	56–70	Russia
Scoring by quarter: 16–19, 15–12, 16–25, 9–14
Pts: Pag 15; Rebs: Pag 6 Asts: Barzola, Sancisi 1		Pts: Kolosovskaya 19; Rebs: Fedorova, Sazonova 10; Asts: Burovaya 3

PalaJacazzi
Referees: Ge Qian (CHN), Gatis Saliņš (LAT), Veronika Vávrová (CZE)

5 July 2019
13:00 UTC+2

Boxscore

Russia	54–75	Portugal
Scoring by quarter: 18–29, 15–17, 12–20, 9–9
Pts: Kolosovskaya 14; Rebs: Kazakova 8 Asts: three players 2		Pts: Ferreira 30; Rebs: Ferreira 9 Asts: Viana 4

PalaCercola
Referees: Pualan Spurlock-Welsh (USA), Alberto Achutegui (MEX), Nikola Bejat (NOR)

Quarterfinal

7 July 2019
20:00 UTC+2

Boxscore

Japan	89–83	Russia
Scoring by quarter: 22–23, 16–19, 31–19, 20–22
Pts: Nakada 17; Rebs: Fujimoto 6 Asts: Takada 7		Pts: Matushkina 28; Rebs: Fedorova 6 Asts: Burovaya 8

Palasport Del Mauro
Referees: Leonardo Zalazar (ARG), Mora Gaytán (MEX), Péter Praksch (HUN)

5–8th place semifinal

8 July 2019
17:30 UTC+2

Boxscore

Russia	73–64	China
Scoring by quarter: 21–16, 18–14, 17–15, 17–19
Pts: Burovaya 16; Rebs: Fedorova, Kazakova 8 Asts: Fedorova 3		Pts: Ma 17; Rebs: Zhou 7 Asts: Song 3

PalaJacazzi
Referees: Pualan Spurlock-Welsh (USA), Christine Vuong (CAN), Ryoko Odanaka (JPN)

Fifth place game

10 July 2019
10:30 UTC+2

Boxscore

Russia	74–58	Chinese Taipei
Scoring by quarter: 20–16, 18–13, 13–18, 23–11
Pts: Fedorova 20; Rebs: Fedorova 17; Asts: Burovaya 6		Pts: Chen W. 20; Rebs: Hsu 7 Asts: four players 3

Palasport Del Mauro
Referees: Alexandra Stan (ROU), Paulo Marques (POR), Nikola Bejat (NOR)

== Diving ==
Men

Athlete	Event	Preliminaries		Semifinal		Final	
Athlete	Event	Points	Rank	Points	Rank	Points	Rank
Egor Lapin	1 m springboard	256.35	23	Did not advance			
Ilia Molchanov	1 m springboard	336.75	3 SB	321.55	4	Did not advance	
Nikita Nikolaev	1 m springboard	293.30	15	Did not advance			
Egor Lapin	3 m springboard	249.00	31	Did not advance			
Ilia Molchanov	3 m springboard	347.20	8 Q	386.45	5 Q	409.65	3rd place, bronze medalist(s)
Nikita Nikolaev	3 m springboard	271.25	25	Did not advance			
Aleksandr Belevtsev	10 m platform	352.90	10	Did not advance			
German Stroev	10 m platform	382.55	6 Q	381.35	6 Q	380.80	7
Igor Vnukov	10 m platform	386.85	5 Q	368.30	8 Q	396.15	5
Ilia Molchanov; Nikita Nikolaev	3 m synchronized springboard	—N/a				373.62	2nd place, silver medalist(s)
German Stroev; Igor Vnukov	10 m synchronized platform	—N/a				352.11	6

Women

Athlete	Event	Preliminaries		Semifinal		Final	
Athlete	Event	Points	Rank	Points	Rank	Points	Rank
Vera Lutovinova	1 m springboard	176.85	24	Did not advance			
Evgeniia Selezneva	1 m springboard	183.80	22	Did not advance			
Daria Selvanovskaia	1 m springboard	201.95	15	Did not advance			
Viktoriia Shirinova	3 m springboard	179.60	24	Did not advance			
Karina Shkliar	3 m springboard	241.35	11 Q	250.70	10 Q	299.10	3rd place, bronze medalist(s)
Tatiana Stepanova	3 m springboard	240.85	12 Q	249.15	11 Q	280.60	5
Olga Bykovskaia	10 m platform	169.50	22	Did not advance			
Daria Selvanovskaia	10 m platform	178.60	19 Q	217.75	14	Did not advance	
Tatiana Stepanova	10 m platform	227.75	12 Q	191.30	16	Did not advance	
Daria Selvanovskaia; Tatiana Stepanova	3 m synchronized springboard	—N/a				248.67	7
Daria Selvanovskaia; Tatiana Stepanova	10 m synchronized platform	—N/a				227.82	5

Mixed

Athlete	Event	Final	
Athlete	Event	Points	Rank
Aleksandr Belevtsev; Karina Shkliar	Mixed team event	335.10	4
Egor Lapin; Evgeniia Selezneva	3 m synchronized springboard	287.40	2nd place, silver medalist(s)
Ilia Smirnov; Daria Selvanovskaia	10 m synchronized platform	286.32	3rd place, bronze medalist(s)

Team classification

Team	Points	Rank
Men's	3198.04	3rd place, bronze medalist(s)
Women's	2205.20	4

Qualification legend: QF – Qualify to final; SA – Qualify to Semifinal Group A; SB – Qualify to Semifinal Group B

== Fencing ==
Men

Athlete	Event	Pool round		Round of 64	Round of 32	Round of 16	Quarterfinal	Semifinal	Final / BM	
Athlete	Event	Result	Seed	Opposition Score	Opposition Score	Opposition Score	Opposition Score	Opposition Score	Opposition Score	Rank
Alan Fardzinov	Épée	2–4	64	Did not advance						
Dmitriy Gusev	Épée	4–1	11	Ng (HKG); W 15–10	Jurka (CZE); W 15–9	Giannotte (LUX); W 15–9	Vismara (ITA); W 15–14	Jang (KOR); W 15–12	Rubeš (CZE); L 6–7	2nd place, silver medalist(s)
Dmitrii Shvelidze	Épée	3–3	34	Taranenko (UKR); W 15–14	Stankevych (UKR); L 11–15	Did not advance				
Alan Fardzinov; Dmitriy Gusev; Dmitrii Shvelidze; Artem Tselyshev	Team épée	—N/a			Bye	Netherlands (NED); W 44–43	France (FRA); W 45–37	Poland (POL); W 45–37	South Korea (KOR); L 31–45	2nd place, silver medalist(s)
Iskander Akhmetov	Foil	4–1	15	Dzhus (UKR); W 15–7	Rosatelli (ITA); L 12–15	Did not advance				
Askar Khamzin	Foil	6–0	2	Bye	Choi (KOR); W 15–8	Rosatelli (ITA); L 14–15	Did not advance			
Grigoriy Semenyuk	Foil	4–2	22	Haravskyi (UKR); L 13–15	Did not advance					
Iskander Akhmetov; Alan Fardzinov; Askar Khamzin; Grigoriy Semenyuk	Team foil	—N/a				Netherlands (NED); W 45–30	Belgium (BEL); W 45–31	Italy (ITA); L 30–45	Australia (AUS); W 45–23	3rd place, bronze medalist(s)
Kirill Efimov	Sabre	5–1	11	Bye	Cavaliere (ITA); L 6–15	Did not advance				
Mark Stepanov	Sabre	3–3	30	Kossuth (HUN); L 9–15	Did not advance					
Artem Tselyshev	Sabre	3–3	38	Matias (POR); W 15–9	Ursachi (ROU); L 9–15	Did not advance				
Iskander Akhmetov; Kirill Efimov; Mark Stepanov; Artem Tselyshev	Team sabre	—N/a			Bye	Japan (JPN); L 43–45	Did not advance			

Women

Athlete	Event	Pool round		Round of 64	Round of 32	Round of 16	Quarterfinal	Semifinal	Final / BM	
Athlete	Event	Result	Seed	Opposition Score	Opposition Score	Opposition Score	Opposition Score	Opposition Score	Opposition Score	Rank
Daria Martynyuk	Épée	5–0	5	Bye	Swatowska (POL); L 13–15	Did not advance				
Maria Obraztsova	Épée	4–1	18	Vuorinen (FIN); W 15–12	Linde (SWE); W 8–7	Marzani (ITA); L 11–14	Did not advance			
Evgeniya Zharkova	Épée	5–1	6	Bye	Jeon (KOR); W 15–12	Luty (FRA); W 15–12	Xu (CHN); W 15–13	Marzani (ITA); W 15–9	Louis-Marie (FRA); L 12–15	2nd place, silver medalist(s)
Anna Koroleva; Daria Martynyuk; Maria Obraztsova; Evgeniya Zharkova	Team épée	—N/a			Bye	Mexico (MEX); W 45–30	Germany (GER); W 45–30	France (FRA); W 45–43	Italy (ITA); W 45–40	1st place, gold medalist(s)
Olga Batenina	Foil	3–3	34	Ahumada (CHI); W 15–7	Mancini (ITA); L 8–15	Did not advance				
Oksana Martines Hauregi	Foil	5–1	6	Bye	Cheng (HKG); W 15–6	Pöltz (HUN); W 15–8	Patru (FRA); L 11–15	Did not advance		
Maria Melnikova	Foil	4–2	15	Bye	Catarzi (FRA); L 6–15	Did not advance				
Olga Batenina; Oksana Martines Hauregi; Daria Martynyuk; Maria Melnikova	Team foil	—N/a				India (IND); W 45–8	South Korea (KOR); W 45–37	France (FRA); W 45–31	Italy (ITA); L 38–45	2nd place, silver medalist(s)
Alexandra Klimova	Sabre	3–2	21	Harrill (USA); W 15–8	Jijieishvili (GEO); L 7–15	Did not advance				
Anna Koroleva	Sabre	4–2	17	Bye	Lucarini (ITA); L 10–15	Did not advance				
Anna Smirnova	Sabre	4–2	15	Bye	Lee (SGP); L 13–15	Did not advance				
Alexandra Klimova; Anna Koroleva; Oksana Martines Hauregi; Anna Smirnova	Team sabre	—N/a				India (IND); W 45–13	Japan (JPN); W 45–42	Italy (ITA); L 33–45	South Korea (KOR); L 29–45	4

== Football ==
Summary

Team	Event	Group stage			Quarterfinals	Semifinals / PM	Final / BM / PM	
Team	Event	Opposition Score	Opposition Score	Rank	Opposition Score	Opposition Score	Opposition Score	Rank
Russia men's	Men's tournament	Argentina; W 2–0	Japan; L 1–4	2 Q	Republic of Ireland; W 1–0	Brazil; L 1–2	Italy; L 2–2; 3–4 (p)	4
Russia women's	Women's tournament	Mexico; W 1–0	China; W 1–0	1 Q	South Korea; W 1–1; 4–1 (p)	Japan; L 1–2	Republic of Ireland; W 2–2; 4–2 (p)	3rd place, bronze medalist(s)

=== Men's tournament ===
Group stage

Pos	Team	Pld	W	D	L	GF	GA	GD	Pts	Qualification
1	Japan	2	2	0	0	7	1	+6	6	Quarterfinals
2	Russia	2	1	0	1	3	4	−1	3	Quarterfinals
3	Argentina	2	0	0	2	0	5	−5	0	Classification round

Source: Napoli 2019
2 July 2019
18:00

Argentina	0–2	Russia
	Report	Kirsanov 43'; Yusupov 69'

Stadio Simonetta Lamberti, Cava de' Tirreni
Referee: Abdel Aziz Bouh (Mauritania)

7 July 2019
18:00

Japan	4–1	Russia
Hayashi 13'; Kaneko 20', 24'; Hatate 36'	Report	Ustinov 76'

Stadio Comunale San Mauro, Casoria
Referee: Silva Freitas da Silva (Brazil)

Quarterfinal

9 July 2019
21:00

Republic of Ireland	0–1	Russia
	Report	Salamatov 7' (pen.)

Stadio Alberto Pinto, Caserta
Referee: Timotheos Christofi (Cyprus)

Semifinal

11 July 2019
17:00

Russia	1–2	Brazil
Pogorelov 52'	Report	R. dos Santos 14'; Pacheco 16'

Stadio Arechi, Salerno
Referee: Sherzod Kasimov (Uzbekistan)

Bronze medal match

13 June 2019
17:00

Russia	2–2	Italy (bronze)
Salamatov 67' (pen.); Pogorelov 90+3'	Report	Zonta 13' (pen.); Galeandro 34'
Penalties
Yusupov (penalty scored); Nasyrov (penalty scored); Kuftin (penalty missed); Kirsanov (penalty scored); Salamatov (penalty missed)	3–4	(penalty scored) Sbrissa; (penalty scored) Ruzzittu; (penalty missed) Collodel; (penalty scored) Mercadante; (penalty scored) Strada

Stadio Arechi, Salerno
Referee: Kevin Ortega (Peru)

=== Women's tournament ===
Group stage

Pos	Team	Pld	W	D	L	GF	GA	GD	Pts	Qualification
1	Russia	2	2	0	0	2	0	+2	6	Quarterfinals
2	China	2	1	0	1	3	3	0	3	Quarterfinals
3	Mexico	2	0	0	2	2	4	−2	0	Classification round

Source: Napoli 2019
2 July 2019
21:00

Mexico	0–1	Russia
	Report	Shishkina 72'

Stadio San Francesco d'Assisi, Nocera Inferiore

6 July 2019
18:00

China	0–1	Russia
	Report	Organova 48'

Stadio Marcello Torre, Pagani
Referee: Shamirah Nabadda (Uganda)

Quarterfinal

8 July 2019
18:00

Russia	1–1	South Korea
Khotyreva 22'	Report	Han Chae-rin 68'
Penalties
Organova (penalty scored); Sinko (penalty scored); Gasanova (penalty scored); Cherkasova (penalty scored)	4–1	(penalty missed) Mok Seung-yeon; (penalty scored) Lee So-hee; (penalty missed) Song Ji-yoon

Stadio Simonetta Lamberti, Cava de' Tirreni
Referee: Marta Huerta de Aza (Spain)

Semifinal

10 July 2019
21:00

Russia	1–2	Japan
Dubova 73'	Report	Ouci 14', 49'

Stadio Arechi, Salerno
Referee: Marta Huerta de Aza (Spain)

Bronze medal match

12 June 2019
17:00

Republic of Ireland	2–2	Russia (bronze)
Kelly 16'; Ryan Doyle 64'	Report	Shkoda 72'; Organova 77'
Penalties
McQuillan (penalty scored); Smith Lynch (penalty missed); Craven (penalty missed); Ryan Doyle (penalty scored)	2–4	(penalty scored) Organova; (penalty scored) Sinko; (penalty scored) Gasanova; (penalty scored) Dubova

Stadio Ciro Vigorito, Benevento
Referee: Oh Hyeon-jeong (South Korea)

== Gymnastics ==
=== Artistic gymnastics ===
Men
Team

Athlete	Event	Final							
Athlete	Event	Apparatus						Total	Rank
Athlete	Event	F	PH	R	V	PB	HB	Total	Rank
Ilya Kibartas	Team	12.750	13.150	13.600	did not start			DNF	–
Kirill Prokopev	Team	15.100 Q	13.000	13.600	14.500	13.000	13.650	82.850	5 Q
Ivan Stretovich	Team	13.850	12.350	13.450	14.400	14.400 Q	14.250 Q	82.700	6 Q
Total	Team	28.950	26.150	27.200	28.900	27.400	27.900	166.500	3rd place, bronze medalist(s)

Individual finals

Athlete	Event	Apparatus						Total	Rank
Athlete	Event	F	PH	R	V	PB	HB	Total	Rank
Kirill Prokopev	All-around	14.800	12.550	13.400	14.100	13.475	11.800	80.125	10
Kirill Prokopev	Floor	14.950	—N/a					14.950	1st place, gold medalist(s)
Ivan Stretovich	All-around	14.000	14.075	13.600	14.400	14.250	14.050	84.375	2nd place, silver medalist(s)
Ivan Stretovich	Parallel bars	—N/a				14.800	—N/a	14.800	2nd place, silver medalist(s)
Ivan Stretovich	Horizontal bar	—N/a					14.600	14.600	3rd place, bronze medalist(s)

Women
Team

Athlete	Event	Final					
Athlete	Event	Apparatus				Total	Rank
Athlete	Event	V	UB	BB	F	Total	Rank
Lilia Akhaimova	Team	14.400 Q	12.950	12.300	13.350 Q	53.000	2 Q
Tatiana Nabieva	Team	14.550 Q	13.500 Q	did not start		DNF	–
Ulyana Perebinosova	Team	13.650	13.600 Q	12.850 Q	12.900 Q	53.000	3 Q
Total	Team	28.950	27.100	25.150	26.250	107.450	2nd place, silver medalist(s)

Individual finals

Athlete	Event	Apparatus				Total	Rank
Athlete	Event	V	UB	BB	F	Total	Rank
Lilia Akhaimova	All-around	14.550	13.100	12.750	12.300	52.700	3rd place, bronze medalist(s)
Lilia Akhaimova	Vault	13.975	—N/a			13.975	2nd place, silver medalist(s)
Lilia Akhaimova	Floor	—N/a			12.250	12.250	6
Tatiana Nabieva	Vault	13.925	—N/a			13.925	3rd place, bronze medalist(s)
Tatiana Nabieva	Uneven bars	—N/a	13.900	—N/a		13.900	2nd place, silver medalist(s)
Ulyana Perebinosova	All-around	13.500	14.350	12.100	12.750	52.700	2nd place, silver medalist(s)
Ulyana Perebinosova	Uneven bars	—N/a	12.750	—N/a		12.750	7
Ulyana Perebinosova	Balance beam	—N/a		12.800	—N/a	12.800	3rd place, bronze medalist(s)
Ulyana Perebinosova	Floor	—N/a			12.700	12.700	3rd place, bronze medalist(s)

=== Rhythmic gymnastics ===
Individual

Athlete	Event	Final & Qualification					
Athlete	Event	Hoop	Ball	Clubs	Ribbon	Total	Rank
Ekaterina Selezneva	All-around	21.400 Q	21.300 Q	21.400 Q	19.500 Q	83.600	1st place, gold medalist(s)
Ekaterina Selezneva	Hoop	21.200	—N/a			21.200	1st place, gold medalist(s)
Ekaterina Selezneva	Ball	—N/a	21.550	—N/a		21.550	1st place, gold medalist(s)
Ekaterina Selezneva	Clubs	—N/a		20.000	—N/a	20.000	3rd place, bronze medalist(s)
Ekaterina Selezneva	Ribbon	—N/a			20.450	20.450	1st place, gold medalist(s)

Group

Athlete	Event	Final & Qualification			
Athlete	Event	5 balls	3 hoops + 2 clubs	Total	Rank
Alina Alieva; Elina Baruzdina; Marina Kozlova; Valeriia Rusina; Angelina Shkatova	All-round	24.200 Q	23.050 Q	47.250	1st place, gold medalist(s)
Alina Alieva; Elina Baruzdina; Marina Kozlova; Valeriia Rusina; Angelina Shkatova	5 balls	25.075	—N/a	25.075	1st place, gold medalist(s)
Alina Alieva; Elina Baruzdina; Marina Kozlova; Valeriia Rusina; Angelina Shkatova	3 hoops + 4 clubs	—N/a	25.650	25.650	1st place, gold medalist(s)

== Judo ==
Men

Athlete	Event	Round of 64	Round of 32	Round of 16	Quarterfinals	Semifinals	Repechage 1	Repechage 2	Repechage 3	Final / BM	
Athlete	Event	Opposition Result	Opposition Result	Opposition Result	Opposition Result	Opposition Result	Opposition Result	Opposition Result	Opposition Result	Opposition Result	Rank
Ismail Chasygov	–66 kg	Bye	Skouroumounis (CYP); W 10s0–0s2	Miceli (ITA); W 10s0–0h	Vieru (MDA); L 0h–10s2	Did not advance	Bye	Chambas (CHI); W 11s0–0s0	Jean (FRA); W 11s0–0h	Boros (HUN); W 10s0–0s2	3rd place, bronze medalist(s)
Evgeny Prokopchuk	–73 kg	Bye	Neves (BRA); W 11s0–0s0	Kang (KOR); W 10s1–0s0	Tarulis (LTU); W 11s0–0s0	Turaev (UZB); W 10s0–0s0	Bye			Heydarov (AZE); W 1s0–0s0	1st place, gold medalist(s)
Abas Azizov	–81 kg	Bye	Bayanmunkh (MGL); W 10s1–0s1	Heijman (NED); W 10s0–0h	Duinovs (LAT); W 10s0–0s1	Lee (KOR); L 0s0–10s0	Bye			Grigalashvili (GEO); L 0s0–10s0	5
Roman Dontsov	–90 kg	Bye	Kozłowski (POL); W 10s1–0h	Tumaev (AZE); W 1s1–0s1	Pacher (AUT); L 0s0–10s1	Did not advance	Bye	Shepel (UKR); W 10s0–0s0	Tóth (HUN); L 0h–10s0	Did not advance	
Ruslan Shakhbazov	+90 kg	—N/a	Petkus (LTU); W 1s1–0s2	Chen (TPE); W 10s0–0s0	Panko (UKR); W 10s1–0h	Kim (KOR); W 10s2–0h	Bye			Nakano (JPN); W 10s0–0s2	1st place, gold medalist(s)
Abas Azizov; Ismail Chasygov; Roman Dontsov; Evgeny Prokopchuk; Ruslan Shakhbazov	Team	—N/a	Mexico (MEX); W 3–0	Hungary (HUN); W 3–1	Kazakhstan (KAZ); W 3–1	Azerbaijan (AZE); W 3–1	Bye	—N/a		South Korea (KOR); W 3–2	1st place, gold medalist(s)

Women

Athlete	Event	Round of 64	Round of 32	Round of 16	Quarterfinals	Semifinals	Repechage 1	Repechage 2	Repechage 3	Final / BM	
Athlete	Event	Opposition Result	Opposition Result	Opposition Result	Opposition Result	Opposition Result	Opposition Result	Opposition Result	Opposition Result	Opposition Result	Rank
Daria Bobrikova	–52 kg	Bye	Beder (TUR); W 10s0–1s0	Kaleta (POL); W 10s1–0s0	Purevsuren (MGL); W 10s0–0s0	Park (KOR); L 0s2–1s2	Bye			Blanaru (MDA); W 10s0–0s1	3rd place, bronze medalist(s)
Natalia Golomidova	–57 kg	—N/a	Bye	Deberdt (FRA); L 0s2–10s0	Did not advance		Ebrahim (USA); W 11s0–0s1	Šikić (CRO); W 11s1–0s1	Hsu (TPE); W 10s0–0h	Skora (UKR); W 10s2–1s0	3rd place, bronze medalist(s)
Kamila Badurova	–63 kg	—N/a	Liao (TPE); W 1s1–0s1	Hansen (DEN); W 10s0–0s1	Van den Berg (NED); L 0s0–10s0	Did not advance	Bye	Coughlan (AUS); W 10s0–0s0	Oberan (CRO); W 11s2–0s1	Han (KOR); W 1s2–0s1	3rd place, bronze medalist(s)
Madina Taimazova	–70 kg	—N/a	Girdžiūtė (LTU); W 10s0–0s0	Matniyazova (UZB); W 10s0–0s1	Vetterli (SUI); W 10s0–0s0	Antykalo (UKR); W 10s0–0s0	Bye			Tanaka (JPN); L 0s2–10s1	2nd place, silver medalist(s)
Anna Gushchina	+70 kg	—N/a	Bye	Erdenebileg (MGL); W 10s0–0s0	Lucht (GER); W 1s0–0s2	Akiba (JPN); L 0s2–10s0	Bye			Marchand (FRA); W	3rd place, bronze medalist(s)
Kamila Badurova; Daria Bobrikova; Natalia Golomidova; Anna Gushchina; Madina Taimazova	Team	—N/a	Bye	United States (USA); W 3–0	Mongolia (MGL); W 3–0	South Korea (KOR); W 3–2	Bye	—N/a		Japan (JPN); L 0–3	2nd place, silver medalist(s)

== Rugby sevens ==
Summary

Team	Event	Group stage				Semifinals	Final / BM	
Team	Event	Opposition Score	Opposition Score	Opposition Score	Rank	Opposition Score	Opposition Score	Rank
Russia men's	Men's tournament	Romania; W 33–5	Argentina; L 14–26	South Africa; W 17–14	2 Q	Japan; L 0–14	France; L 10–12	4
Russia women's	Women's tournament	Argentina; W 41–7	Belgium; W 52–0	South Africa; L 10–14	2 Q	Japan; L 12–31	South Africa; W 12–10	3rd place, bronze medalist(s)

== Sailing ==
Athlete	Class	Qualification																		Final					
Athlete	Class	Race																Total points	Rank	Race				Total points	Rank
Athlete	Class	1	2	4	5	9	10	11	12	17	18	21	22	26	27	29	30	Total points	Rank	1	2	3	4	Total points	Rank
Daria Fedianina; Marina Taran; Dmitrii Tretiakov; Ivan Volchkov	RS21	3	6	1	5	3	2	4	5	3	8	7	2	4	3	3	2	61	6 Q	7	7	4	5	29	6

== Shooting ==
Men

Athlete	Event	Qualification		Final	
Athlete	Event	Points	Rank	Points	Rank
Mikhail Isakov	10 m air pistol	566	19	Did not advance	
Vladislav Fetisov	10 m air rifle	625.0	8 Q	206.5	4
Evgenii Panchenko	10 m air rifle	630.1	1 Q	227.2	3rd place, bronze medalist(s)
Sergey Demin	Skeet	123+?	1 Q	35	4
Viktor Veretin	Trap	120+?	5 Q	25	5

Women

Athlete	Event	Qualification		Final	
Athlete	Event	Points	Rank	Points	Rank
Iana Enina	10 m air pistol	564	17	Did not advance	
Margarita Lomova	10 m air pistol	565	13	Did not advance	
Maria Ivanova	10 m air rifle	624.2	16	Did not advance	
Veronika Pavlova	10 m air rifle	623.4	21	Did not advance	
Regina Shakirova	Skeet	106	7	Did not advance	

Mixed team

Athlete	Event	Qualification				Final / BM	
Athlete	Event	Stage 1		Stage 2		Final / BM	
Athlete	Event	Points	Rank	Points	Rank	Opposition Result	Rank
Evgenii Panchenko; Maria Ivanova	10 m air rifle	625.1	4 Q	623.5	3 q	Wang / Shi (CHN); W 17–13	3rd place, bronze medalist(s)
Mikhail Isakov; Margarita Lomova	10 m air pistol	563	9	Did not advance			

== Swimming ==
Men

Athlete	Event	Heat		Semifinal		Final	
Athlete	Event	Time	Rank	Time	Rank	Time	Rank
Maksim Ablovatskii	100 m freestyle	50.04	14 Q	50.01	14	Did not advance	
Vladimir Dubinin	100 m freestyle	50.27	17	Did not advance			
Aleksandr Fedorov	200 m freestyle	1:48.70	1 Q	1:47.97	3 Q	1:49.23	8
Aleksandr Fedorov	400 m freestyle	3:52.05	11	—N/a		Did not advance	
Ilia Khomenko	50 m breaststroke	27.82	12 Q	27.80	10	Did not advance	
Ilia Khomenko	100 m breaststroke	1:01.36	14 Q	1:00.54	9	Did not advance	
Ilia Khomenko	200 m breaststroke	2:11.14	3 Q	2:11.28	3 Q	2:09.42	2nd place, silver medalist(s)
Aleksandr Kudashev	200 m butterfly	1:57.30	1 Q	1:57.01	2 Q	1:55.63	1st place, gold medalist(s)
Vladimir Kudriashov	200 m butterfly	1:59.20	14 Q	1:58.14	8 Q	1:57.55	5
Egor Kuimov	100 m butterfly	52.76	6 Q	52.64	8 Q	52.05	1st place, gold medalist(s)
Ivan Kuzmenko	50 m freestyle	22.55	7 Q	22.40	10	Did not advance	
Roman Larin	200 m backstroke	1:59.77	10 Q	1:59.69	11	Did not advance	
Ernest Maksumov	800 m freestyle	8:00.63	4 Q	—N/a		8:00.54	6
Ernest Maksumov	1500 m freestyle	15:28.44	9	—N/a		Did not advance	
Daniil Markov	50 m freestyle	22.65	12 Q	22.39	8	22.39	3rd place, bronze medalist(s)
Daniil Markov	50 m butterfly	24.33	16 Q	23.78	6 Q	23.91	6
Anton Nikitin	400 m freestyle	3:49.40	2 Q	—N/a		3:50.41	3rd place, bronze medalist(s)
Anton Nikitin	800 m freestyle	7:59.70	1 Q	—N/a		7:56.65	1st place, gold medalist(s)
Mark Nikolaev	50 m backstroke	25.20	6 Q	25.00	4 Q	25.16	6
Mark Nikolaev	100 m backstroke	54.55	3 Q	54.56	7 Q	54.51	6
Kirill Prigoda	50 m breaststroke	1:00.53	6 Q	59.96	6 Q	59.50	2nd place, silver medalist(s)
Kirill Prigoda	100 m breaststroke	27.33	3 Q	27.28	2 Q	26.99	1st place, gold medalist(s)
Kirill Prigoda	200 m breaststroke	2:09.99	1 Q	2:09.16	1 Q	2:08.88	1st place, gold medalist(s)
Aleksandr Sadovnikov	50 m butterfly	23.90	5 Q	23.94	11	Did not advance	
Aleksandr Sadovnikov	100 m butterfly	52.21	1 Q	52.19	3 Q	52.35	6
Nikolay Snegirev	200 m freestyle	1:49.23	5 Q	1:47.42	1 Q	1:46.97	2nd place, silver medalist(s)
Maxim Stupin	200 m individual medley	2:01.11	5 Q	2:01.75	9	Did not advance	
Maxim Stupin	400 m individual medley	4:17.43	3 Q	—N/a		4:15.37	3rd place, bronze medalist(s)
Grigoriy Tarasevich	50 m backstroke	24.91	3 Q	24.64	3 Q	24.94	3rd place, bronze medalist(s)
Grigoriy Tarasevich	100 m backstroke	54.28	2 Q	53.71	2 Q	53.51	1st place, gold medalist(s)
Grigoriy Tarasevich	200 m backstroke	1:59.79	12 Q	1:58.11	4 Q	1:57.91	2nd place, silver medalist(s)
Maksim Ablovatskii; Vladimir Dubinin; Daniil Markov*; Ivan Kuzmenko; Nikolay Snegirev	4 × 100 m freestyle relay	3:18.80	5 Q	—N/a		3:18.01	5
Maksim Ablovatskii*; Vladimir Dubinin*; Aleksandr Fedorov; Aleksandr Kudashev; Roman Larin*; Ernest Maksumov*; Anton Nikitin; Nikolay Snegirev	4 × 200 m freestyle relay	7:21.34	8 Q	—N/a		7:14.94	4
Ilia Khomenko*; Egor Kuimov; Ivan Kuzmenko; Mark Nikolaev*; Kirill Prigoda; Aleksandr Sadovnikov*; Grigoriy Tarasevich	4 × 100 m medley relay	3:34.55	2 Q	—N/a		3:33.72	2nd place, silver medalist(s)

Women

Athlete	Event	Heat		Semifinal		Final	
Athlete	Event	Time	Rank	Time	Rank	Time	Rank
Mariya Baklakova	200 m freestyle	2:00.68	2 Q	1:59.22	3 Q	1:59.00	3rd place, bronze medalist(s)
Vasilissa Buinaia	100 m freestyle	57.28	26	Did not advance			
Daria Chikunova	50 m breaststroke	32.33	22	Did not advance			
Daria Chikunova	100 m breaststroke	1:08.81	7 Q	1:08.51	9	Did not advance	
Daria Chikunova	200 m breaststroke	2:26.82	3 Q	2:25.30	3 Q	2:25.14	5
Aleksandra Denisenko	200 m individual medley	2:18.75	19	Did not advance			
Aleksandra Denisenko	400 m individual medley	4:52.55	16	—N/a		Did not advance	
Polina Egorova	50 m backstroke	29.43	16 Q	did not start		Did not advance	
Polina Egorova	50 m butterfly	27.31	15 Q	27.21	13	Did not advance	
Polina Egorova	100 m butterfly	59.92	8 Q	59.38	6 Q	59.16	5
Nika Godun	50 m breaststroke	31.15	2 Q	31.60	6	Did not advance	
Nika Godun	100 m breaststroke	1:09.30	13 Q	1:08.90	13	Did not advance	
Elizaveta Klevanovich	50 m freestyle	25.82	9 Q	25.86	15	Did not advance	
Elizaveta Klevanovich	100 m freestyle	55.77	5 Q	55.63	4 Q	55.58	5
Irina Krivonogova	200 m freestyle	2:00.79	3 Q	2:00.14	6 Q	2:00.98	7
Irina Krivonogova	400 m freestyle	4:19.90	14	—N/a		Did not advance	
Irina Krivonogova	400 m individual medley	4:49.19	10	—N/a		Did not advance	
Rozaliya Nasretdinova	50 m freestyle	26.27	25	Did not advance			
Anastasiia Osipenko	100 m backstroke	1:02.74	16 Q	1:03.01	16	Did not advance	
Anastasiia Osipenko	200 m backstroke	2:14.57	13 Q	2:14.80	14	Did not advance	
Irina Prikhodko	800 m freestyle	8:43.35	5 Q	—N/a		8:37.36	2nd place, silver medalist(s)
Irina Prikhodko	200 m backstroke	2:14.23	12 Q	2:13.63	11	Did not advance	
Irina Prikhodko	200 m individual medley	2:17.73	17	Did not advance			
Sofia Spodarenko	50 m butterfly	26.91	6 Q	26.84	7 Q	26.80	6
Sofia Spodarenko	100 m butterfly	1:00.88	22	Did not advance			
Ksenia Vasilenok	50 m backstroke	29.02	11 Q	28.98	12	Did not advance	
Ksenia Vasilenok	100 m backstroke	1:02.46	14 Q	1:02.67	14	Did not advance	
Mariya Baklakova; Vasilissa Buinaia; Elizaveta Klevanovich; Rozaliya Nasretdinova; Irina Prikhodko*	4 × 100 m freestyle relay	3:45.52	4 Q	—N/a		3:44.84	4
Mariya Baklakova; Vasilissa Buinaia*; Aleksandra Denisenko*; Elizaveta Klevanovich; Irina Krivonogova; Anastasiia Osipenko*; Irina Prikhodko; Ksenia Vasilenok*	4 × 200 m freestyle relay	8:26.33	6 Q	—N/a		8:03.85	3rd place, bronze medalist(s)
Mariya Baklakova; Daria Chikunova; Polina Egorova; Elizaveta Klevanovich*; Irina Prikhodko	4 × 100 m medley relay	4:07.35	7 Q	—N/a		4:03.55	4

== Table tennis ==
Singles

Athlete	Event	Group stage			Round of 64	Round of 32	Round of 16	Quarterfinals	Semifinals	Final	
Athlete	Event	Opposition Result	Opposition Result	Rank	Opposition Result	Opposition Result	Opposition Result	Opposition Result	Opposition Result	Opposition Result	Rank
Maxim Chaplygin	Men's singles	Bruijne (NED); W 3–0	Fierro (CHI); W 3–0	1 Q	Igarashi (JPN); L 0–4	Did not advance					
Sadi Ismailov	Men's singles	Bye			Di Marino (ITA); W 4–0	Tsuboi (JPN); W 4–1	Manole (ROU); W 4–0	Kong (CHN); W 4–2	Yu (CHN); L 0–4	Did not advance	3rd place, bronze medalist(s)
Aleksandr Tiutriumov	Men's singles	Bye			Weerasinghe (GBR); W 4–2	Leung (HKG); W 4–1	Zhao (CHN); L 0–4	Did not advance			
Lev Volin	Men's singles	Qiu (GER); L 2–3	Chu (USA); W 3–0	2 Q	Percan Kindblad (SWE); L 3–4	Did not advance					
Ekaterina Cherniavskaia	Women's singles	Abdulaziz (KSA); W 3–0	Yeung (CAN); W 3–0	1 Q	Jo (KOR); L 0–4	Did not advance					
Mariia Malanina	Women's singles	Jaanimägi (EST); W 3–0	Maetaki (JPN); L 0–3	2 Q	Bajor (POL); L 2–4	Did not advance					
Yana Noskova	Women's singles	Bye			Sirisena (SRI); W 4–0	Kammerer (GER); W 4–1	Maetaki (JPN); L 3–4	Did not advance			
Valeria Shcherbatykh	Women's singles	Bye			Scholz (GER); W 4–3	Migot (FRA); W 4–3	Fan (CHN); L 0–4	Did not advance			

Doubles

Athlete	Event	Round of 64	Round of 32	Round of 16	Quarterfinals	Semifinals	Final	
Athlete	Event	Opposition Result	Opposition Result	Opposition Result	Opposition Result	Opposition Result	Opposition Result	Rank
Maxim Chaplygin; Lev Volin	Men's doubles	Unawatuna / Wickramanayake (SRI); W 3–0	Allegro / Pieraert (BEL); L 0–3	Did not advance				
Sadi Ismailov; Aleksandr Tiutriumov	Men's doubles	Bye	Yong / Nam (KOR); L 0–3	Did not advance				
Ekaterina Cherniavskaia; Mariia Malanina	Women's doubles	Bye	Liu / Sieu (CAN); W 3–1	Ando / Sasao (JPN); L 0–3	Did not advance			
Yana Noskova; Valeria Shcherbatykh	Women's doubles	Bye	Maetaki / Seyama (JPN); W 3–2	Migot / Guisnel (FRA); W 3–2	Bergström / Jonsson (SWE); W 4–1	Fan / Wang (CHN); L 0–4	Did not advance	3rd place, bronze medalist(s)
Maxim Chaplygin; Mariia Malanina	Mixed's doubles	Bye	Deng / Guan (USA); W 3–0	Liao / Su (TPE); L 1–3	Did not advance			
Sadi Ismailov; Yana Noskova	Mixed's doubles	Bye	Yong / Jeong (KOR); W 3–2	Hung / Li (HKG); W 3–1	Peng / Huang (TPE); W 4–1	Zhao / Fan (CHN); L 0–4	Did not advance	3rd place, bronze medalist(s)

Teams

Athlete	Event	Group stage				Round of 16	Quarterfinals	Semifinals	Final	
Athlete	Event	Opposition Result	Opposition Result	Opposition Result	Rank	Opposition Result	Opposition Result	Opposition Result	Opposition Result	Rank
Maxim Chaplygin; Sadi Ismailov; Aleksandr Tiutriumov; Lev Volin	Men's team	Germany (GER); W 3–0	Estonia (EST); W 3–0	—N/a	1 Q	Italy (ITA); W 3–0	Chinese Taipei (TPE); L 2–3	Did not advance		
Ekaterina Cherniavskaia; Mariia Malanina; Yana Noskova; Valeria Shcherbatykh	Women's team	Estonia (EST); W 3–0	Australia (AUS); W 3–0	Hong Kong (HKG); W 3–1	1 Q	Poland (POL); W 3–0	Chinese Taipei (TPE); W 3–2	Japan (JPN); L 0–3	Did not advance	3rd place, bronze medalist(s)

== Taekwondo ==
Kyorugi

Athlete	Event	Round of 64	Round of 32	Round of 16	Quarterfinals	Semifinals	Final	
Athlete	Event	Opposition Result	Opposition Result	Opposition Result	Opposition Result	Opposition Result	Opposition Result	Rank
Georgii Gurtsiev	Men's −58 kg	Bye	V. Dimitrov (MDA); W 26–12	Ramos (CHI); W 16–14	Sawekwiharee (THA); L 26–34	Did not advance		
Maksat Allalyev	Men's −63 kg	Bye	S. Dimitrov (MDA); L 11–16	Did not advance				
Bulat Gabdulbarov	Men's −68 kg	Bye	Ceccaroni (SMR); W 19–5	Abdelrahman (EGY); L 6–8	Did not advance			
Mikhail Shestakov	Men's −74 kg	Avanesov (ARM); W 12–9	Mutak (CRO); L 14–14 (GDP 0–2)	Did not advance				
Artur Baimatov	Men's −80 kg	—N/a	Wilson (USA); W 22–11	Tausch (GER); W 21–11	Eissa (EGY); L 2–7	Did not advance		
Rafael Kamalov	Men's −87 kg	—N/a	Bye	Szaferski (POL); W 16–12	García (ESP); W 15–13	Park (KOR); L 3–8	Did not advance	3rd place, bronze medalist(s)
	Men's team	—N/a	Bye	South Korea (KOR); L 32–42	Did not advance			
Margarita Kazanskaia	Women's −49 kg	—N/a	Bezerra (BRA); L 4–8	Did not advance				
Viktoriia Aleksandrova	Women's −53 kg	—N/a	Abdallah (EGY); W 12–7	Abakarova (AZE); L 6–11	Did not advance			
Anisiia Chelokhsaeva	Women's −57 kg	—N/a	Kim (KOR); L 4–4	Did not advance				
Yulia Turutina	Women's −62 kg	—N/a	Ziejewska (POL); W 3–3	Javadi (IRI); W 6–6 (GDP 2–0)	Félix (MEX); W 1–1	Novaes (BRA); W 10–4	Yaman (TUR); L 1–6	2nd place, silver medalist(s)
Alena Gorshkova	Women's −67 kg	—N/a	Bye	Shan (CHN); L 3–12	Did not advance			
Kristina Diubina	Women's –73 kg	—N/a	Yoon (KOR); L 5–6	Did not advance				
	Women's team	—N/a		South Korea (KOR); L 4–7	Did not advance			

Poomsae

Athlete	Event	Preliminary		Semifinal		Final	
Athlete	Event	Score	Rank	Score	Rank	Score	Rank
Dmitrii Kim	Men's individual	6.680	8	Did not advance			
Dmitrii Kim; Vitalii Pak; Konstantin Vashchenko	Men's team	—N/a		7.266	9	Did not advance	
Anna Polukhina	Women's individual	7.633	5 Q	7.170	15	Did not advance	
Daria Denisova; Valeriya Kim; Anna Polukhina	Women's team	—N/a		6.915	11	Did not advance	
Konstantin Vashchenko; Valeriya Kim	Mixed pair	—N/a				Did not advance	

== Tennis ==
Athlete	Event	Round of 128	Round of 64	Round of 32	Round of 16	Quarterfinals	Semifinals	Final	
Athlete	Event	Opposition Score	Opposition Score	Opposition Score	Opposition Score	Opposition Score	Opposition Score	Opposition Score	Rank
Ivan Gakhov	Men's singles	Bye	Ortenzi (ITA); W 3–6, 6–3, 6–3	Prata (POR); W 6–4, 7–6^{(7–5)}	Shimabukuro (JPN); W 6–3, 3–6, 6–0	Fayziev (UZB); W 6–4, 7–6^{(7–4)}	Tseng (TPE); L 0–6, 1–6	Did not advance	3rd place, bronze medalist(s)
Timur Kiyamov	Men's singles	Bye	Vocel (CZE); L 2–6, 5–7	Consolation					
Timur Kiyamov	Men's singles	Bye	Vocel (CZE); L 2–6, 5–7	Bye	Coria (ARG); W 6–4, 6–2	Rangaraju (IND); W 6–1, 6–0	Liaonenka (BLR); W 6–2, 6–4	Orlov (UKR); L 4–6, 3–6	
Ivan Gakhov; Timur Kiyamov	Men's doubles	—N/a		Muraviov / Orlov (UKR); W 6–3, 6–3	Fitriadi / Susanto (INA); W 6–1, 6–4	Wu / Xu (CHN); L 6–7^{(2–7)}, 3–6	Did not advance		
Victoria Kan	Women's singles	Bye	Altick (USA); W 6–1, 3–6, 6–3	Abbate (ITA); W 6–0, 6–0	Šumová (CZE); W 6–0, 6–1	Jundakate (THA); L 4–6, ret	Did not advance		
Yana Sizikova	Women's singles	Bye	Bakhodirova (UZB); W 6–1, 6–2	Landmann (RSA); W 6–1, 6–0	Morisaki (JPN); L 4–6, 6–3, 5–7	Did not advance			
Victoria Kan; Yana Sizikova	Women's doubles	—N/a		Bye	Contreras / Villarreal (MEX); L 2–6, 6–3, [2–10]	Did not advance			
Ivan Gakhov; Yana Sizikova	Mixed doubles	—N/a		Bye	Reséndiz / Villarreal (MEX); W 6–1, 6–2	Prata / Santos (POR); W 6–4, 7–5	Wu / Ye (CHN); W 6–4, 2–6, [10–5]	Kellovský / Zarycká (CZE); W 4–6, 6–2, [10–8]	1st place, gold medalist(s)

Team classification

Team	Points	Rank
Men's	90	2nd place, silver medalist(s)
Women's	75	3rd place, bronze medalist(s)

== Volleyball ==
Summary

Team	Event	Group stage					Quarterfinals / PM	Semifinals / PM	Final / BM / PM	
Team	Event	Opposition Score	Opposition Score	Opposition Score	Opposition Score	Rank	Opposition Score	Opposition Score	Opposition Score	Rank
Russia men's	Men's tournament	Portugal; W 3–1	South Korea; W 3–0	China; W 3–0	United States; W 3–0	1 Q	Japan; W 3–1	Poland; L 2–3	France; W 3–0	3rd place, bronze medalist(s)
Russia women's	Women's tournament	Thailand; W 3–0	Mexico; W 3–0	Canada; W 3–1	—N/a	1 Q	Czech Republic; W 3–0	Japan; W 3–1	Italy; W 3–1	1st place, gold medalist(s)

=== Men's tournament ===
Group stage

Pos	Team	Pld	W	L	Pts	SW	SL	SR	SPW	SPL	SPR	Qualification
1	Russia	4	4	0	12	12	1	12.000	324	232	1.397	Quarterfinals
2	Portugal	4	3	1	9	10	4	2.500	338	306	1.105	Quarterfinals
3	United States	4	2	2	4	6	10	0.600	329	369	0.892	9–16th place quarterfinals
4	South Korea	4	1	3	4	6	9	0.667	320	352	0.909	9–16th place quarterfinals
5	China	4	0	4	1	2	12	0.167	286	338	0.846	17–20th place semifinals

Source: Napoli 2019

5 July 2019; 20:20	Russia	3–1	Portugal	Palazzetto dello Sport, Ariano Irpino
5 July 2019; 20:20	(24–26, 25–15, 25–20, 25–17); Result Statistics			Palazzetto dello Sport, Ariano Irpino

6 July 2019; 17:30	South Korea	0–3	Russia	Palazzetto dello Sport, Ariano Irpino
6 July 2019; 17:30	(17–25, 22–25, 18–25); Result Statistics			Palazzetto dello Sport, Ariano Irpino

7 July 2019; 20:00	Russia	3–0	China	Palazzetto dello Sport, Ariano Irpino
7 July 2019; 20:00	(25–20, 25–15, 25–15); Result Statistics			Palazzetto dello Sport, Ariano Irpino

8 July 2019; 17:30	United States	0–3	Russia	PalaSele, Eboli
8 July 2019; 17:30	(13–25, 15–25, 19–25); Result Statistics			PalaSele, Eboli

Quarterfinal

11 July 2019; 12:00	Russia	3–1	Japan	PalaSele, Eboli
11 July 2019; 12:00	(25–21, 25–11, 23–25, 25–14); Result Statistics			PalaSele, Eboli

Semifinal

12 July 2019; 12:00	Poland	3–2	Russia	PalaSele, Eboli
12 July 2019; 12:00	(25–21, 25–15, 19–25, 18–25, 17–15); Result Statistics			PalaSele, Eboli

Bronze medal match

13 July 2019; 17:30	France	0–3	Russia (bronze)	PalaSele, Eboli
13 July 2019; 17:30	(18–25, 20–25, 22–25); Result Statistics			PalaSele, Eboli

=== Women's tournament ===
Group stage

Pos	Team	Pld	W	L	Pts	SW	SL	SR	SPW	SPL	SPR	Qualification
1	Russia	3	3	0	9	9	1	9.000	244	170	1.435	Quarterfinals
2	Canada	3	2	1	6	7	3	2.333	231	214	1.079	Quarterfinals
3	Thailand	3	1	2	3	3	7	0.429	210	234	0.897	9–16th place quarterfinals
4	Mexico	3	0	3	0	1	9	0.111	181	248	0.730	9–16th place quarterfinals

Source: Napoli 2019

5 July 2019; 14:35	Thailand	0–3	Russia	PalaTedeschi, Benevento
5 July 2019; 14:35	(14–25, 15–25, 19–25); Result Statistics			PalaTedeschi, Benevento

6 July 2019; 12:00	Mexico	0–3	Russia	PalaTedeschi, Benevento
6 July 2019; 12:00	(8–25, 20–25, 16–25); Result Statistics			PalaTedeschi, Benevento

7 July 2019; 14:40	Russia	3–1	Canada	PalaTedeschi, Benevento
7 July 2019; 14:40	(25–17, 19–25, 25–21, 25–15); Result Statistics			PalaTedeschi, Benevento

Quarterfinal

9 July 2019; 12:00	Russia	3–0	Czech Republic	PalaSele, Eboli
9 July 2019; 12:00	(27–25, 25–17, 25–16); Result Statistics			PalaSele, Eboli

Semifinal

10 July 2019; 17:30	Russia	3–1	Japan	PalaSele, Eboli
10 July 2019; 17:30	(21–25, 26–24, 25–19, 25–21); Result Statistics			PalaSele, Eboli

Final

12 July 2019; 20:30	(gold) Russia	3–1	Italy (silver)	PalaSele, Eboli
12 July 2019; 20:30	(25–21, 15–25, 26–24, 25–18); Result Statistics			PalaSele, Eboli

== Water polo ==
Summary

Team	Event	Group stage					Round of 16	Quarterfinals	Semifinals / PM	Final / BM / PM	
Team	Event	Opposition Score	Opposition Score	Opposition Score	Opposition Score	Rank	Opposition Score	Opposition Score	Opposition Score	Opposition Score	Rank
Russia men's	Men's tournament	Great Britain; W 25–1	France; W 12–4	South Korea; W 31–3	United States; L 8–13	2 Q	Bye	Australia; W 13–7	Italy; L 6–14	Hungary; L 22–23 (pso)	4
Russia women's	Women's tournament	United States; W 10–9	China; W 17–12	Australia; W 17–7	Italy; L 8–9	2 Q	Bye	China; W 12–8	Hungary; L 14–16 (pso)	Canada; W 22–7	3rd place, bronze medalist(s)

=== Men's tournament ===
Group stage

Pos	Team	Pld	W	D	L	GF	GA	GD	Pts	Qualification
1	United States	4	4	0	0	70	22	+48	12	Quarterfinals
2	Russia	4	3	0	1	76	21	+55	9	Quarterfinals
3	France	4	2	0	2	49	31	+18	6	Quarterfinals
4	Great Britain	4	1	0	3	30	66	−36	3	Round of 16
5	South Korea	4	0	0	4	15	100	−85	0	Round of 16

Source: Napoli 2019

2 July 2019; 13:30	Report	Russia	25–1	Great Britain	Stadio del Nuoto, Caserta; Referees: Mac Mac (CAN); Hiroaki Ogino (JPN)
2 July 2019; 13:30	Report	Score by quarters: 5–0, 7–1, 7–0, 6–0			Stadio del Nuoto, Caserta; Referees: Mac Mac (CAN); Hiroaki Ogino (JPN)
2 July 2019; 13:30	Report	Vasilev 6	Goals	Daly 1	Stadio del Nuoto, Caserta; Referees: Mac Mac (CAN); Hiroaki Ogino (JPN)

3 July 2019; 11:30	Report	Russia	12–4	France	Stadio del Nuoto, Caserta; Referees: Rajmund Fodor (HUN); Luca Bianco (ITA)
3 July 2019; 11:30	Report	Score by quarters: 3–2, 2–1, 3–0, 4–1			Stadio del Nuoto, Caserta; Referees: Rajmund Fodor (HUN); Luca Bianco (ITA)
3 July 2019; 11:30	Report	Bychkov 4	Goals	four players 1	Stadio del Nuoto, Caserta; Referees: Rajmund Fodor (HUN); Luca Bianco (ITA)

6 July 2019; 15:30	Report	South Korea	3–31	Russia	Stadio del Nuoto, Caserta; Referees: Massimo Castrilli (SUI); Natsuki Saito (JPN)
6 July 2019; 15:30	Report	Score by quarters: 0–7, 2–11, 1–5, 0–8			Stadio del Nuoto, Caserta; Referees: Massimo Castrilli (SUI); Natsuki Saito (JPN)
6 July 2019; 15:30	Report	three players 1	Goals	Krug 8	Stadio del Nuoto, Caserta; Referees: Massimo Castrilli (SUI); Natsuki Saito (JPN)

8 July 2019; 13:30	Report	United States	13–8	Russia	Stadio del Nuoto, Caserta; Referees: Rajmund Fodor (HUN); Luca Bianco (ITA)
8 July 2019; 13:30	Report	Score by quarters: 3–2, 5–0, 2–4, 3–2			Stadio del Nuoto, Caserta; Referees: Rajmund Fodor (HUN); Luca Bianco (ITA)
8 July 2019; 13:30	Report	Abramson 4	Goals	Merkulov 3	Stadio del Nuoto, Caserta; Referees: Rajmund Fodor (HUN); Luca Bianco (ITA)

Quarterfinal

10 July 2019; 13:30	Report	Russia	13–7	Australia	Stadio del Nuoto, Caserta; Referees: Massimo Calabro (ITA); Hiroaki Ogino (JPN)
10 July 2019; 13:30	Report	Score by quarters: 5–0, 1–4, 4–2, 3–1			Stadio del Nuoto, Caserta; Referees: Massimo Calabro (ITA); Hiroaki Ogino (JPN)
10 July 2019; 13:30	Report	three players 3	Goals	Townsend 3	Stadio del Nuoto, Caserta; Referees: Massimo Calabro (ITA); Hiroaki Ogino (JPN)

Semifinal

13 July 2019; 12:00	Report	Italy	14–6	Russia	Piscina Felice Scandone, Naples; Referees: Xevi Buch (ESP); Radu Matache (ROU)
13 July 2019; 12:00	Report	Score by quarters: 4–1, 3–2, 3–0, 4–3			Piscina Felice Scandone, Naples; Referees: Xevi Buch (ESP); Radu Matache (ROU)
13 July 2019; 12:00	Report	Cannella 4	Goals	Bychkov 3	Piscina Felice Scandone, Naples; Referees: Xevi Buch (ESP); Radu Matache (ROU)

Bronze medal match

14 July 2019; 11:00	Report	Russia	22–23 (PSO)	Hungary (bronze)	Piscina Felice Scandone, Naples; Referees: Joseph Peila (USA); Radu Matache (ROU)
14 July 2019; 11:00	Report	Score by quarters: 1–3, 4–2, 2–0, 3–5 PSO: 12–13			Piscina Felice Scandone, Naples; Referees: Joseph Peila (USA); Radu Matache (ROU)
14 July 2019; 11:00	Report	Merkulov 4	Goals	Burián 4	Piscina Felice Scandone, Naples; Referees: Joseph Peila (USA); Radu Matache (ROU)

=== Women's tournament ===
Group stage

Pos	Team	Pld	W	D	L	GF	GA	GD	Pts	Qualification
1	Italy (H)	4	4	0	0	37	31	+6	12	Quarterfinals
2	Russia	4	3	0	1	52	37	+15	9	Quarterfinals
3	Australia	4	2	0	2	40	39	+1	6	Quarterfinals
4	United States	4	1	0	3	38	40	−2	3	Round of 16
5	China	4	0	0	4	37	57	−20	0	Round of 16

Source: Napoli 2019
(H) Hosts

2 July 2019; 17:30	Report	United States	9–10	Russia	Alba Oriens, Casoria; Referees: Xavier Buch (ESP); Radu Matache (ROU)
2 July 2019; 17:30	Report	Score by quarters: 1–0, 1–4, 1–3, 6–3			Alba Oriens, Casoria; Referees: Xavier Buch (ESP); Radu Matache (ROU)
2 July 2019; 17:30	Report	Hill 4	Goals	three players 2	Alba Oriens, Casoria; Referees: Xavier Buch (ESP); Radu Matache (ROU)

4 July 2019; 17:30	Report	Russia	17–12	China	Alba Oriens, Casoria; Referees: Zsolt Marjay (HUN); Mike Jukes (GBR)
4 July 2019; 17:30	Report	Score by quarters: 4–1, 4–4, 5–4, 4–3			Alba Oriens, Casoria; Referees: Zsolt Marjay (HUN); Mike Jukes (GBR)
4 July 2019; 17:30	Report	three players 3	Goals	Bi, Li J. 3	Alba Oriens, Casoria; Referees: Zsolt Marjay (HUN); Mike Jukes (GBR)

5 July 2019; 17:30	Report	Russia	17–7	Australia	Alba Oriens, Casoria; Referees: Maria Daskalopoulou (GRE); Zsolt Marjay (HUN)
5 July 2019; 17:30	Report	Score by quarters: 6–3, 3–0, 5–3, 3–1			Alba Oriens, Casoria; Referees: Maria Daskalopoulou (GRE); Zsolt Marjay (HUN)
5 July 2019; 17:30	Report	Zaplatina 5	Goals	Williams 3	Alba Oriens, Casoria; Referees: Maria Daskalopoulou (GRE); Zsolt Marjay (HUN)

8 July 2019; 19:30	Report	Italy	9–8	Russia	Alba Oriens, Casoria; Referees: Mario Dalli (MLT); Radu Matache (ROU)
8 July 2019; 19:30	Report	Score by quarters: 4–2, 3–1, 1–3, 1–2			Alba Oriens, Casoria; Referees: Mario Dalli (MLT); Radu Matache (ROU)
8 July 2019; 19:30	Report	Centanni 3	Goals	three players 2	Alba Oriens, Casoria; Referees: Mario Dalli (MLT); Radu Matache (ROU)

Quarterfinal

10 July 2019; 17:30	Report	Russia	12–8	China	Alba Oriens, Casoria; Referees: Pascal Bouchez (FRA); Luca Bianco (ITA)
10 July 2019; 17:30	Report	Score by quarters: 4–2, 4–1, 3–3, 1–2			Alba Oriens, Casoria; Referees: Pascal Bouchez (FRA); Luca Bianco (ITA)
10 July 2019; 17:30	Report	Pystina 5	Goals	Bi 3	Alba Oriens, Casoria; Referees: Pascal Bouchez (FRA); Luca Bianco (ITA)

Semifinal

12 July 2019; 20:00	Report	Hungary	16–14 (PSO)	Russia	Piscina Felice Scandone, Naples; Referees: Mario Dalli (MLT); Xevi Buch (ESP)
12 July 2019; 20:00	Report	Score by quarters: 4–5, 4–3, 1–0, 3–4 PSO: 4–2			Piscina Felice Scandone, Naples; Referees: Mario Dalli (MLT); Xevi Buch (ESP)
12 July 2019; 20:00	Report	Máthé 3	Goals	Chagochkina 4	Piscina Felice Scandone, Naples; Referees: Mario Dalli (MLT); Xevi Buch (ESP)

Bronze medal match

13 July 2019; 18:00	Report	Canada	7–22	Russia (bronze)	Piscina Felice Scandone, Naples; Referees: Luca Bianco (ITA); Zsolt Marjay (HUN)
13 July 2019; 18:00	Report	Score by quarters: 1–7, 1–3, 4–7, 1–5			Piscina Felice Scandone, Naples; Referees: Luca Bianco (ITA); Zsolt Marjay (HUN)
13 July 2019; 18:00	Report	Rojas 3	Goals	Kempf 8	Piscina Felice Scandone, Naples; Referees: Luca Bianco (ITA); Zsolt Marjay (HUN)
