= Archery at the 2019 Summer Universiade – Mixed team recurve =

Mixed team recurve at the XXX Summer Universiade
- Venues: Partenio Stadium, Royal Palace
- Dates: July 8, 2019 – July 13, 2019
- Competitors: 60 from 30 nations

Medalists
1st place, gold medalist(s)		Chia-Mao Peng; Chun-Heng Wei	Chinese Taipei
2nd place, silver medalist(s)		Risa Horiguchi; Yuta Ishii	Japan
3rd place, bronze medalist(s)		Polina Rodionova; Artem Ovchynnikov	Ukraine

The mixed team recurve archery competition at the 2019 Summer Universiade was held in the Partenio Stadium, Avellino, Italy and the Royal Palace in Caserta, Italy between July 8 and 13.

== Qualification round ==
Qualified for Round of 16
Qualified for 1/12 Round

Rank	Team	Archer	Individual	Team	Notes
Rank	Team	Archer	Score	Total	Notes
1	South Korea	Chae Young Kang	676	1348	
1	South Korea	Woo Seok Lee	672	1348	
2	China	Xinyan Zhang	653	1312	
2	China	Dapeng Wang	659	1312	
3	Chinese Taipei	Chia-Mao Peng	651	1309	
3	Chinese Taipei	Chun-Heng Wei	658	1309	
4	Russia	Valeria Mylnikova	641	1307	
4	Russia	Erdem Tsydypov	666	1307	
5	Japan	Risa Horiguchi	629	1287	
5	Japan	Yuta Ishii	658	1287	
6	Indonesia	Diananda Choirunisa	630	1276	
6	Indonesia	Hendra Burnama	646	1276	
7	Switzerland	Olga Fusek	61	1270	T. 46;7
7	Switzerland	Florian Faber	659	1270	T. 46;7
8	Ukraine	Polina Rodionova	626	1270	T. 35;12
8	Ukraine	Artem Ovchynnikov	644	1270	T. 35;12
9	France	Clémence Tellier	621	1268	T. 41;8
9	France	Lou Thirion	647	1268	T. 41;8
10	United States	Amy Nicole Jung	625	1268	T. 32;9
10	United States	Matthew Joseph Zumbo	643	1268	T. 32;9
11	Mexico	Alejandra Valencia Trujillo	650	1267	
11	Mexico	Miguel Alonso Anchodo Mendoza	617	1267	
12	India	Premilaben Shankarbhai	621	1257	T. 36;10
12	India	Uttkarsh	636	1257	T. 36;10
13	Spain	Celia Castanos Bornaechea	618	1257	T. 31;8
13	Spain	KenSanchez Antoku	639	1257	T. 31;8
14	Poland	Magdalena Smialkowska	618	1247	
14	Poland	Mateusz Ogrodowczyk	629	1247	
15	Slovakia	Alexandra Longova	622	1234	
15	Slovakia	Vladimir Hurban	612	1234	
16	Mongolia	Zolzaya Munkhbat	585	1229	
16	Mongolia	Dashnamjil Dorjsuren	644	1229	
17	Kazakhstan	Anna Polyakova	590	1227	
17	Kazakhstan	Artem Kostin	637	1227	
18	Moldova	Milena Gatco	564	1220	
18	Moldova	Dan Olaru	656	1220	
19	Italy	Chiara Rebagliati	622	1216	
19	Italy	Matteo Santi	594	1216	
20	Great Britain	Hannah Grace Burnage	579	1215	
20	Great Britain	William Sydney Pike	636	1215	
21	Slovenia	Teja Slana	594	1214	
21	Slovenia	Ziga Ravnikar	620	1214	
22	Czech Republic	Klara Grapova	576	1212	
22	Czech Republic	Karel Neuwirth	636	1212	
23	Singapore	Xin Yu Keller Chai	587	1210	
23	Singapore	Sion Wei Xiang Teo	623	1210	
24	Australia	Belinda Maxworthy	620	1206	
24	Australia	James Gaze	586	1206	
25	Malaysia	Shaerra Ezzaty Saffuan	594	1202	
25	Malaysia	Muhammad Ikram Joni	608	1202	
26	Estonia	Alexandra Polliumae	592	1199	
26	Estonia	Karl Kivilo	607	1199	
27	Netherlands	Ilse Houbiers	539	1179	
27	Netherlands	Damiaan Jeurissen	640	1179	
28	Philippines	Loren Chloe Balaoing	600	1174	
28	Philippines	Allen Drei Raquipo	574	1174	
29	Uzbekistan	Gulnoza Makhamadjonova	539	1170	
29	Uzbekistan	Ynus Sarmambetov	631	1170	
30	Sweden	Cheryl Loorents	481	1033	
30	Sweden	Martin Ostman	552	1033	

== Elimination round ==
1/12 Round
1	South Korea
Bye
17	Kazakhstan	6	29	35	36	26
16	Mongolia	2	31	33	23	21
9	France	6	34	36	31
24	Australia	0	29	35	29
Bye
8	Ukraine
5	Japan
Bye
21	Slovenia	0	33	35	33
12	India	6	34	37	36
13	Spain	6	33	37	35
20	Great Britain	0	28	36	34
Bye
4	Russia
3	Chinese Taipei
Bye
19	Italy	6	36	27	35	32
14	Poland	2	35	33	34	31
11	Mexico	5	36	35	34	32
22	Czech Republic	3	33	25	35	32
Bye
6	Indonesia
7	Switzerland
Bye
23	Singapore	2	33	30	33	30
10	United States	6	32	35	34	34
15	Slovakia	2	32	37	35	35
18	Moldova	6	35	32	36	36
Bye
2	China

Round of 16
1	South Korea	6	38	37	35
17	Kazakhstan	0	36	34	37
9	France	4	34	36	32	38	T. 16
8	Ukraine	5	30	38	34	36	T. 19
5	Japan	5	36	35	35
12	India	1	33	30	35
13	Spain	5	36	36	35
4	Russia	1	36	34	34
3	Chinese Taipei	5	36	38	35
19	Italy	1	36	33	34
11	Mexico	3	37	35	36	35
6	Indonesia	5	36	37	36	35
7	Switzerland	3	36	31	33	36
10	United States	5	32	33	34	36
18	Moldova	0	34	32	35
2	China	6	38	36	38

Quarterfinals
1	South Korea	1	34	33	37
8	Ukraine	5	36	34	37
5	Japan	5	35	32	36	38
13	Spain	3	37	30	34	38
3	Chinese Taipei	6	37	36	38	34
6	Indonesia	38	31	33	33
10	United States	5	36	36	34	39
2	China	3	36	35	37	35

Quarterfinals
8	Ukraine	3	34	33	35	26
5	Japan	5	37	32	35	35
3	Chinese Taipei	6	37	40	37
10	United States	0	31	33	36

Semifinals
5	Japan	3	32	32	34	38
3	Chinese Taipei	5	36	30	34	39
Third place
8	Ukraine	6	37	33	36	37
10	United States	2	33	39	32	35
