= Archery at the 2019 Summer Universiade – Women's team recurve =

Women's team recurve at the XXX Summer Universiade
- Venues: Partenio Stadium, Royal Palace
- Dates: July 8, 2019 – July 13, 2019
- Competitors: 44 from 22 nations

Medalists
1st place, gold medalist(s)		Misun Choi; Chae Young Kang	South Korea
2nd place, silver medalist(s)		Svetlana Gomboeva; Valeria Mylnikova	Russia
3rd place, bronze medalist(s)		Iryna Khochyna; Polina Rodionova	Ukraine

The women's team recurve archery competition at the 2019 Summer Universiade was held in the Partenio Stadium, Avellino, Italy and the Royal Palace in Caserta, Italy between July 8 and July 13.

== Qualification round ==
Qualified for Round of 16

Rank	Team	Archer	Individual	Team
Rank	Team	Archer	Score	Total
1	South Korea	Misun Choi	669	1345
1	South Korea	Chae Young Kang	676	1345
2	Russia	Svetlana Gomboeva	636	1277
2	Russia	Valeria Mylnikova	641	1277
3	China	Qingning Ru	620	1273
3	China	Xinyan Zhang	653	1273
4	Chinese Taipei	Chia-Mao Peng	651	1257
4	Chinese Taipei	Yu-Chen Peng	606	1257
5	Ukraine	Iryna Khochyna	626	1252
5	Ukraine	Polina Rodionova	626	1252
6	Japan	Risa Horiguchi	629	1251
6	Japan	Azusa Yamauchi	622	1251
7	Mexico	Sandra Vanessa Garza Garcia	589	1239
7	Mexico	Alejandra Valencia Trujillo	650	1239
8	India	Premilaben Shankarbhai Baria	621	1236
8	India	Sakshi Rajendra Shitole	615	1236
9	Poland	Magdalena Smialkowska	618	1235
9	Poland	Sylwia Zyzanska	617	1235
10	United States	Eliana Vaughn Claps	601	1226
10	United States	Amu Nicole Jung	625	1226
11	Spain	Celia Castanos Bornaechea	618	1223
11	Spain	Adriana Rosa Martín Lázaro	605	1223
12	Indonesia	Diananda Choirunisa	630	1220
12	Indonesia	Ratna Humaira Kaerunnisa	590	1220
13	Italy	Tanya Giada Giaccheri	586	1208
13	Italy	Chiara Rebagliati	622	1208
14	Switzerland	Iliana Deineko	595	1206
14	Switzerland	Olga Fusek	611	1206
15	Slovenia	Urska Cavic	592	1186
15	Slovenia	Teja Slana	594	1186
16	Kazakhstan	Talshyn Kussaiyn	576	1166
16	Kazakhstan	Anna Polyakova	590	1166
17	Estonia	Triinu Lilienthal	556	1148
17	Estonia	Alexandra Pollumae	592	1148
18	Malaysia	Shaerra Ezzaty Saffuan	594	1138
18	Malaysia	Nur Aqilah Yusof	544	1138
19	Great Britain	Hannah Grace Burnage	579	1132
19	Great Britain	Phillipa Elizabeth Taylor	553	1132
20	Philippines	Loren Chloe Balaoing	600	1095
20	Philippines	Shanaya Rose Dangla	495	1095
21	Mongolia	Enkhzul Enkhbayar	484	1069
21	Mongolia	Zolzaya Munkhbat	585	1069
22	Uzbekistan	Gulnoza Makhamadjonova	539	992
22	Uzbekistan	Gulmirakhon Urinboeva	453	992

== Elimination round ==
Round of 16
1	South Korea	6	37	36	38
16	Kazakhstan	0	24	33	32
9	Poland	6	34	38	33	35
8	India	2	32	31	35	31
5	Ukraine	5	35	35	34	34
12	Indonesia	3	35	38	29	32
13	Italy	0	35	32	34
4	Chinese Taipei	6	37	34	35
3	China	4	34	34	38	32	T. 15
14	Switzerland	5	29	35	33	33	T. 19
11	Spain	5	34	34	38	34	T. 18*
6	Japan	4	38	36	36	32	T.18
7	Mexico	6	33	37	37
10	United States	0	32	36	33
15	Slovenia	3	35	35	34	32
2	Russia	5	36	35	32	39

Quarterfinals
1	South Korea	5	37	'38	39
9	Poland	1	37	34	33
5	Ukraine	5	34	34	34	34	T. 17*
4	Chinese Taipei	4	37	35	32	33	T.17
14	Switzerland	5	32	28	38	28
11	Spain	3	31	30	32	28
7	Mexico	4	32	34	36	33	T. 15
2	Russia	5	32	37	34	33	T. 18

Semifinals
1	South Korea	6	37	39	35	34
5	Ukraine	0	34	34	34
14	Switzerland	0	26	31	33
2	Russia	6	36	32	37

Final
1	South Korea	5	36	38	36
2	Russia	1	33	32	36
Third place
5	Ukraine	6	35	36	37
14	Switzerland	6	29	29	31
