= Archery at the 2019 Summer Universiade – Men's team recurve =

Men's team recurve at the XXX Summer Universiade
- Venues: Partenio Stadium, Royal Palace
- Dates: July 8, 2019 – July 13, 2019
- Competitors: 52 from 26 nations

Medalists
1st place, gold medalist(s)		Erdem Tsydypov; Beligto Tsynguev	Russia
2nd place, silver medalist(s)		Chih-Chun Tang; Chun-Heng Wei	Chinese Taipei
3rd place, bronze medalist(s)		Adam Wyatt Heidt; Matthew Joseph Zumbo	United States

The men's team recurve archery competition at the 2019 Summer Universiade was held in the Partenio Stadium, Avellino, Italy and the Royal Palace in Caserta, Italy between July 8 and 13.

== Qualification round ==
Qualified for Round of 16

Rank	Team	Archer	Individual	Team	Notes
Rank	Team	Archer	Score	Total	Notes
1	South Korea	Woo Seok Lee	672	1328	
1	South Korea	Yubin Nam	656	1328	
2	China	Xiangshuo Qi	658	1317	
2	China	Dapeng Wang	659	1317	
3	Chinese Taipei	Chih-Chun Tang	649	1307	T. 52;23
3	Chinese Taipei	Chun-Heng Wei	658	1307	T. 52;23
4	Japan	Yuta Ishii	658	1307	T. 51;17
4	Japan	Daisuke Tomatsu	649	1307	T. 51;17
5	Russia	Erdem Tsydypov	666	1305	
5	Russia	Beligto Tsynguev	639	1305	
6	Germany	Christoph Breitbach	654	1292	
6	Germany	Johannes Maier	638	1292	
7	United States	Adam Wyatt Heidt	642	1285	
7	United States	Matthew Joseph Zumbo	643	1285	
8	Spain	Daniel Castro Barcala	638	1277	
8	Spain	Ken Sanchez Antoku	639	1277	
9	Moldova	Oleg Lacutco	617	1273	T. 43;12
9	Moldova	Dan Olaru	656	1273	T. 43;12
10	Ukraine	Ivan Kozhokar	629	1273	T. 35;12
10	Ukraine	Artem Ovchynnikov	644	1273	T. 35;12
11	France	Ferdinand Delille	623	1270	
11	France	Lou Thirion	647	1270	
12	Croatia	Lovro Cerni	626	1270	T. 44;16
12	Croatia	Ivan Horvat	635	1270	T. 44;16
13	Kazakhstan	Artem Kostin	637	1261	T. 36;11
13	Kazakhstan	Alikhan Mustafin	624	1261	T. 36;11
14	Indonesia	Hendra Purnama	646	1252	T. 39;9
14	Indonesia	Muhammad Hanif Wijaya	606	1252	T. 39;9
15	Czech Republic	Michal Hlahulek	616	1252	T. 34;11
15	Czech Republic	Karel Neuwirth	636	1252	T. 34;11
16	Switzerland	Florian Faber	659	1245	
16	Switzerland	Adrian Faber	586	1245	
17	Slovenia	Rok Bizjak	618	1238	
17	Slovenia	Ziga Ravnikar	620	1238	
18	Poland	Michal Basiuras	608	1237	
18	Poland	Mateusz Ogrodowczyk	629	1237	
19	India	Yashdeep Sanjay Bhoge	600	1236	
19	India	Uttkarsh	636	1236	
20	Uzbekistan	Javlonbek Abdubakirov	604	1235	
20	Uzbekistan	Ynus Sarmambetov	631	1235	
21	Singapore	Hong Xiang Jonas Lim	603	1226	T. 31;10
21	Singapore	Sion Wei Xiang Teo	623	1226	T. 31;10
22	Mexico	Alberto Derek Alvarez Bandala	609	1226	T. 27;6
22	Mexico	Miguel Alonso Anchondo Mendoza	617	1226	T. 27;6
23	Malaysia	Alberto Derek Alvarez Bandala	608	1210	
23	Malaysia	Miguel Alonso Anchondo Mendoza	602	1210	
24	Italy	Paolo Ralli	586	1180	
24	Italy	Matteo Santi	594	1180	
25	Cyprus	Constantinos Panagi	625	1179	
25	Cyprus	Thomas Pantelides	554	1179	
26	Philippines	Jayson Mendoza	459	1033	
26	Philippines	Allen Drei Raquipo	574	1033	

== Elimination round ==
Round of 16
1	South Korea	3	38	37	36	35
16	Switzerland	5	35	38	36	36
9	Moldova	5	38	37	32	36
8	Spain	3	38	29	34	33
5	Russia	5	34	35	37	35
12	Croatia	3	33	38	33	35
13	Kazakhstan	3	35	35	37	36
4	Japan	5	37	34	37	37
3	Chinese Taipei	6	36	37	39
14	Indonesia	0	35	31	36
11	France	3	33	32	36	34
6	Germany	5	35	36	35	34
7	United States	5	33	37	38	33	T. 18
10	Ukraine	4	37	33	36	37	T. 17
15	Czech Republic	2	35	38	35	33
2	China	6	36	35	38	34

Quarterfinals
16	Switzerland	6	34	'36	35
9	Moldova	0	31	35	33
5	Russia	5	38	38	36
4	Japan	1	37	38	34
3	Chinese Taipei	6	38	39	38
6	Germany	0	35	32	35
7	United States	5	38	36	34	39
2	China	3	34	36	36	35

Semifinals
16	Switzerland	3	35	31	33	34
5	Russia	5	35	36	32	36
3	Chinese Taipei	5	36	36	34	37
7	United States	3	38	36	34	31

Final
5	Russia	5	38	36	38
3	Chinese Taipei	1	35	36	37
Third place
16	Switzerland	2	35	27	35	35
7	United States	6	33	36	36	36
