= Diving at the 2019 Summer Universiade – Men's 1 metre springboard =

Men's 1 metre springboard at the Universiade
- Venue: Mostra d'Oltremare
- Dates: 2-4 July 2019
- Competitors: 27 from 15 nations

Medalists
1st place, gold medalist(s)		Chengming Liu	China
2nd place, silver medalist(s)		Frithjof Seidel	Germany
3rd place, bronze medalist(s)		Gabriele Auber	Italy

The men's 1 metre springboard diving event at the 2019 Summer Universiade was contested between 2 and 4 July 2019 at the Mostra d'Oltremare in Naples, Italy.

== Schedule ==
All times are Central European Summer Time (UTC+02:00)

Date	Time	Event
Sunday, 2 July 2019	10:00	Preliminary
Sunday, 2 July 2019	15:00	Semifinals
Tuesday, 4 July 2019	13:30	Final

== Results ==
Qualified for the final
Qualified for the semifinal

=== Preliminary ===
Rank	Athlete	Dive						Total
Rank	Athlete	1	2	3	4	5	6	Total
1	Pingan Li (CHN)	64.50	57.00	52.80	52.80	61.50	73.10	361.70
2	Chengming Liu (CHN)	64.50	55.50	51.00	64.35	62.40	59.50	357.25
3	Ilia Molchanov (RUS)	38.75	63.00	64.00	49.50	58.50	63.00	336.75
4	Alberto Arevalo Alcon (ESP)	63.55	54.00	57.60	45.00	55.50	46.80	322.45
5	Conor Reardon Casey (USA)	55.80	54.00	54.00	55.50	54.00	46.40	319.70
6	Jacob Burton Fielding (USA)	43.50	54.00	45.00	51.15	58.50	67.20	319.35
7	Frithjof Seidel (GER)	56.55	57.00	62.40	39.00	45.90	54.45	315.30
8	Gabriele Auber (ITA)	57.35	55.90	62.40	43.50	52.50	41.40	313.05
9	Alexander Lube (GER)	40.50	60.00	42.00	60.45	46.40	55.50	304.85
10	Lyle Bowman Yost (USA)	55.90	48.00	57.00	49.50	40.50	51.15	302.05
11	Juho Junttila (FIN)	54.60	56.00	36.00	58.50	44.85	51.15	301.10
12	Jaegyeong Yi (KOR)	24.80	55.50	52.80	63.00	52.50	51.75	300.35
13	Nikita Kryvopyshyn (UKR)	46.80	53.30	47.15	46.50	53.30	50.70	297.75
14	D. Garcia De La Fuente (MEX)	55.80	49.50	42.00	52.50	54.00	40.00	293.80
15	Nikita Nikolaev (RUS)	46.50	51.00	42.00	53.30	42.00	58.50	293.30
16	Francesco Porco (ITA)	54.60	57.35	46.50	31.50	51.00	48.10	289.05
17	Andrea Cosoli (ITA)	54.60	53.30	36.00	41.40	42.00	60.45	287.75
18	Adan E. Zuniga Ornelas (MEX)	63.00	52.50	60.45	18.00	25.20	63.00	282.15
19	Max Burman (SWE)	55.90	46.50	41.40	45.00	40.30	45.00	274.10
20	Peter Mai (CAN)	46.50	50.70	31.50	46.50	33.00	63.00	271.20
21	Minjae Ryu (KOR)	53.30	45.30	45.00	33.00	49.50	43.40	267.70
22	Aldinsyah Putra Rafi (INA)	48.10	46.50	54.00	43.20	31.50	40.50	263.80
23	Egor Lapin (RUS)	60.45	49.50	18.00	33.00	52.20	43.20	256.35
24	Taekyn Lee (KOR)	57.20	46.50	42.00	30.40	49.50	28.50	254.10
25	Nicholas Jeffree (AUS)	48.00	52.00	26.45	22.50	46.50	50.70	246.15
26	Tri Anggoro Priambodo (INA)	49.60	44.20	19.50	41.40	36.00	32.55	223.25
27	Haruki Suyama (JPN)	52.50	49.50	54.00	0.00	12.80	51.00	219.80

=== Semifinals ===
==== Group A ====
Rank	Athlete	Dive						Total
Rank	Athlete	1	2	3	4	5	6	Total
1	Gabrielle Auber (ITA)	60.45	53.30	70.40	54.00	55.50	48.30	341.95
2	Jacob Burton Fielding (USA)	57.00	49.50	54.00	57.35	60.00	48.00	325.85
3	Alberto Arevalo Alcon (ESP)	66.65	49.50	57.60	42.00	54.00	50.70	320.45
4	Nikita Kryvopyshyn (UKR)	50.40	50.70	43.70	55.50	48.10	54.60	303.00
5	Juho Junttila (FIN)	54.60	56.00	49.40	54.00	31.05	49.60	294.65

==== Group B ====
Rank	Athlete	Dive						Total
Rank	Athlete	1	2	3	4	5	6	Total
1	Alexander Lube (GER)	49.50	64.50	63.00	66.65	57.60	58.50	359.75
2	Conor Reardon Casey (USA)	57.35	52.50	61.50	69.00	58.50	52.80	351.65
3	Frithjof Seidel (GER)	62.35	45.00	62.40	48.00	51.00	57.75	326.50
4	Ilia Molchanov (RUS)	32.55	36.00	64.00	58.50	63.00	67.50	321.55
5	Jaegyeong Yi (KOR)	41.85	40.50	65.60	54.00	49.50	49.45	'300.90

=== Final ===
Rank	Athlete	Dive						Total
Rank	Athlete	1	2	3	4	5	6	Total
1st place, gold medalist(s)	Chengming Liu (CHN)	63.00	75.00	66.00	59.40	60.80	74.80	399.00
2nd place, silver medalist(s)	Frithjof Seidel (GER)	59.45	51.00	59.20	54.00	71.40	62.70	357.75
3rd place, bronze medalist(s)	Gabriele Auber (ITA)	57.35	54.99	67.20	66.00	64.50	47.15	356.20
4	Alexander Lube (GER)	46.50	63.00	58.50	69.75	46.40	70.50	354.65
5	Jacob Burton Fielding (USA)	51.00	52.50	54.00	62.00	49.50	68.80	337.80
6	Pingan Li (CHN)	58.50	64.50	18.15	64.00	63.00	40.80	308.95
7	Alberto Arevalo Alcon (ESP)	65.10	36.00	14.40	60.00	43.50	52.00	271.00
8	Conor Reardon Casey (USA)	24.80	58.50	37.50	54.00	43.50	41.60	259.90
