= Archery at the 2019 Summer Universiade – Women's individual compound =

Women's individual compound at the XXX Summer Universiade
- Venues: Partenio Stadium, Royal Palace
- Dates: July 8, 2019 – July 13, 2019
- Competitors: 38 from 23 nations

Medalists
1st place, gold medalist(s)		Andrea Becerra	Mexico
2nd place, silver medalist(s)		Chaewon So	South Korea
3rd place, bronze medalist(s)		Yesim Bostan	Turkey

The women's individual compound archery competition at the 2019 Summer Universiade was held in the Partenio Stadium, Avellino, Italy and the Royal Palace in Caserta, Italy between July 8 and 13.

== Records ==
Prior to the competition, the world and Universiade records were as follows.

- 50 metres Round

Category	Athlete	Record	Date	Place	Event
World record	(Colombia) Sara López	713	29 August 2015	Medellín, Colombia	2013 Archery World Cup
Universiade record	(Mexico) Stephanie Salinas	697	04 July 2015	Gwangju, South Korea	2015 Summer Universiade

- 15 arrow Match

Category	Athlete	Record	Date	Place	Event
World record	(Mexico) Linda Ochoa-Anderson	150	12 May 2018	Newberry, USA	
Universiade record	(Slovenia) Toja Cerne	149	05 July 2015	Gwangju, South Korea	2015 Summer Universiade

== Qualification round ==
Qualified for Round of 32
Qualified for 1/24 Round

The qualification round took place on 9 July 2019 to determine the seeding for the elimination rounds. It consisted of two rounds of 36 arrows, with a maximum score of 720.

Rank	Archer	1st Half	2nd Half	10s	Xs	Score	Notes
1	Yesim Bostan (TUR)	352	349	54	27	701	UR
2	Danelle Wentzel (RSA)	349	352	54	24	701	
3	Chaewon So (KOR)	349	346	49	17	695	
4	Andrea Maya Becerra Arizaga (MEX)	350	343	49	21	693	
5	Sarah Elizabeth Moon (GBR)	346	346	45	14	692	
6	Yunhee Kim (KOR)	346	345	45	15	691	
7	Yi-Hsuan Chen (TPE)	345	345	43	17	690	
8	Brenda Merino Escudero (MEX)	346	340	42	11	686	
9	Viktoriya Lyan (KAZ)	339	346	41	15	685	
10	Alexandra Savenkova (RUS)	344	339	44	20	683	
11	Elizaveta Knyazeva (RUS)	343	338	39	21	681	
12	Gizem Elmaagacli (TUR)	337	344	37	18	681	
13	Lisell Jaatma (EST)	338	342	38	14	680	
14	Prabhjot Kaur (IND)	337	341	40	14	678	
15	Sogand Haddad (IRI)	341	337	38	14	678	
16	Lola Grandjean (FRA)	339	339	34	12	678	
17	Emily Hoim (EST)	338	337	35	13	675	
18	Diana Makarchuk (KAZ)	335	340	32	15	675	
19	Ming-Ching Lin (TPE)	335	340	30	12	675	
20	Isabelle Annie Carpenter (GBR)	336	338	33	12	674	
21	Evelien Groeneveld (NED)	340	334	33	5	674	
22	Tze Chieh Contessa Loh (SGP)	333	340	36	16	673	
23	Eleonora Grilli (ITA)	340	332	35	10	672	
24	Dahlia Haline Klimitchek (USA)	337	335	33	9	672	
25	Oleksandra Hrabik (UKR)	335	336	34	13	671	
26	Srishti Singh (IND)	338	331	33	12	669	
27	Ratih Zilizati Fadhly (INA)	344	325	33	10	669	
28	Nur Aina Yasmine Halim (MAS)	338	329	31	13	667	
29	Tiara Sakti Ramadhani (INA)	333	333	32	10	666	
30	Sara Ret (ITA)	331	333	29	7	664	
31	Melissa Regnasco (ARG)	333	330	26	10	663	
32	Niamh Merry (IRL)	327	333	24	11	660	
33	Bahareh Rezaei (IRI)	328	330	24	11	658	
34	Anastasia Krasnitska (UKR)	332	322	25	9	654	
35	Iman Aisyah Norazam (MAS)	328	326	23	6	654	
36	Ayaka Nedachi (JPN)	327	327	20	10	654	
37	Niamh Jones (AUS)	322	324	23	4	646	
38	Cassidy Louise Cox (USA)	50	336	18	7	386	

== Elimination rounds ==
=== Section 1 ===
Round of 48
33	Bahareh Rezaei (IRI)	135
32	Niamh Merry (IRL)	140

Round of 32
1	Yesim Bostan (TUR)	142
32	Niamh Merry (IRL)	134
17	Emily Hoim (EST)	137
16	Lola Grandjean (FRA)	134
9	Viktoriya Lyan (KAZ)	135
24	Dahlia Haline Klimitchek (USA)	138
25	Oleksandra Hrabik (UKR)	136
8	Brenda Merino Escudero (MEX)	140

Round of 16
1	Yesim Bostan (TUR)	147
17	Emily Hoim (ESA)	135
24	Dahila Haline Klimitchek (USA)	136
8	Brenda Merino Escudero (MEX)	143

Quarterfinal
1	Yesim Bostan (TUR)	140
8	Brenda Merino Escudero (MEX)	135

=== Section 2 ===
Round of 48
37	Niamh Jones (AUS)	132
28	Nur Aina Yasmine Halim (MAS)	141
29	Tiara Sakti Ramadhani (INA)	133
36	Ayaka Nedachi (JPN)	129

Round of 32
5	Sarah Elizabeth Moon (GBR)	139
28	Nur Aina Yasmine Halim (MAS)	141
21	Evelien Groeneveld (NED)	128
12	Gizem Elmaagacli (TUR)	136
13	Lisell Jaatma (EST)	131
20	Isabelle Annie Carpenter (GBR)	133
29	Riara Sakti Ramadhani (INA)	133
4	Andrea Maya Becerra Arizaga (MEX)	143

Round of 16
28	Nur Aina Yasmine Halim (MAS)	144
12	Gizem Elmaagacli (TUR)	141
20	Isabelle Annie Carpenter (GBR)	139
4	Andrea Maya Becerra Arizaga (MEX)	142

Quarterfinal
28	Nur Aina Yasmine Halim (MAS)	140
4	Andrea Maya Becerra Arizaga (MEX)	146

=== Section 3 ===
Round of 48
35	Iman Aisyah Norazam (MAS)	135
30	Sara Ret (ITA)	128
27	Ratih Zilizati (INA)	130
38	Cassidy Louise Cox (USA)	136

Round of 32
3	Chaewon So (KOR)	141
35	Iman Aisyah Norazam (MAS)	138
19	Ming-Ching Lin (TPE)	138
14	Prabhjot Kaur (IND)	141
11	Elizaveta Knyazeva (RUS)	140 (T9)
22	Tze Chieh Contessa Loh (SGP)	140 (T9)
38	Cassidy Louise Cox (USA)	134
6	Yunhee Kim (KOR)	138

Round of 16
3	Chaewon So (KOR)	144
14	Prabhjot Kaur (IND)	135
11	Elizaveta Knyazeva (RUS)	143
6	Yunhee Kim (KOR)	137

Quarterfinal
3	Chaewon So (KOR)	148
11	Elizaveta Knyazeva (RUS)	137

=== Section 4 ===
Round of 48
31	Melissa Regnasco (ARG)	128
34	Anastasia Krasnitska (UKR)	129

Round of 32
7	Yi-Hsuan Chen (TPE)	139
26	Srishti Singh (IND)	133
23	Eleonora Grilli (ITA)	140 (T9)
10	Alexandra Savenkova (RUS)	140 (T9)
15	Sogand Haddad (IRI)	136
18	Diana Makarchuk (KAZ)	137
34	Anastasia Krasnitska (UKR)	130
2	Danelle Wentzel (RSA)	144

Round of 16
7	Yi-Hsuan Chen (TPE)	139
23	Eleonora Grilli (ITA)	133
18	Diana Makarchuk (KAZ)	144
2	Danelle Wentzel (RSA)	138

Quarterfinal
7	Yi-Hsuan Chen (TPE)	141
18	Diana Makarchuk (KAZ)	142

=== Final Round ===
Semifinals
1	Yesim Bostan (TUR)	144
4	Andrea Maya Becerra Arizaga (MEX)	147
3	Chaewon So (KOR)	144
18	Diana Makarchuk (KAZ)	142

Final
4	Andrea Maya Becerra Arizaga (MEX)	146
3	Chaewon So (KOR)	141
Bronze Medal
1	Yesim Bostan (TUR)	145
18	Diana Makarchuk (KAZ)	142
