= 2019 World Judo Championships – Mixed team =

Judo competition

Judo Mixed team at the 2019 World Judo Championships
- Venue: Nippon Budōkan
- Location: Tokyo, Japan
- Date: 1 September 2019
- Competitors: 159 from 15 nations
- Total prize money: 200,000$

Medalists
gold medal	Chizuru Arai; Shori Hamada; Hisayoshi Harasawa; Soichi Hashimoto; Kokoro Kageura; Shoichiro Mukai; Sanshiro Murao; Shohei Ono; Yoko Ono; Akira Sone; Momo Tamaoki; Tsukasa Yoshida	Japan
silver medal	Amandine Buchard; Guillaume Chaine; Axel Clerget; Sarah Cysique; Alpha Oumar Djalo; Marie-Ève Gahié; Alexandre Iddir; Kilian Le Blouch; Anne Fatoumata M'Bairo; Madeleine Malonga; Cyrille Maret; Margaux Pinot	France
bronze medal	Kseniia Chibisova; Kirill Denisov; Lechi Ediev; Anna Gushchina; Mikhail Igolnikov; Khusen Khalmurzaev; Anastasia Konkina; Daria Mezhetskaia; Evgeniy Prokopchuk; Alena Prokopenko; Madina Taimazova; Inal Tasoev	Russia
bronze medal	Maria Suelen Altheman; Eduardo Barbosa; Tamires Crude; Rafael Macedo; David Moura; Maria Portela; Ellen Santana; Eduardo Yudy Santos; Jeferson Santos Junior; Rafael Siva; Rafaela Silva; Beatriz Souza	Brazil

Champions
- Mixed team: Japan (3rd title)

Competition at external databases
- Links: IJF • EJU • JudoInside

The mixed team competition at the 2019 World Judo Championships was held on 1 September 2019.

== Results ==
=== Finals ===
Semi-finals
Japan	4
Brazil	0
France	4
Russia	3

Final
Japan	4
France	2

=== Repechage ===
Repechage
South Korea	2
Azerbaijan	4

Third place
Azerbaijan	1
Russia	4

Repechage
Cuba	1
Mongolia	4

Third place
Mongolia	2
Brazil	4

=== Pool A ===
Second round
Netherlands	3
South Korea	4

Quarterfinals
Japan	4
South Korea	0

=== Pool B ===
Second round
Brazil	4
Germany	3
Azerbaijan	4
Portugal	3

Quarterfinals
Brazil	4
Azerbaijan	1

=== Pool C ===
Second round
France	4
Austria	2
Cuba	4
Kazakhstan	2

Quarterfinals
France	4
Cuba	3

=== Pool D ===
Second round
Russia	4
IJF	0
Mongolia	4
China	3

Quarterfinals
Russia	4
Mongolia	0

== Prize money ==
The sums listed bring the total prizes awarded to 200,000$ for the team event.

Medal	Total	Judoka	Coach
Gold	90,000$	72,000$	18,000$
Silver	60,000$	48,000$	12,000$
Bronze	25,000$	20,000$	5,000$
