= India at the 2013 Summer Universiade =

- IOC code: IND

in Kazan
- Competitors: 37
- Medals Ranked 44th: Gold 0 Silver 1 Bronze 0 Total 1

Summer Universiade appearances
- 1959; 1961; 1963; 1965; 1967; 1970; 1973; 1975; 1977; 1979; 1981; 1983; 1985; 1987; 1989; 1991; 1993; 1995; 1997; 1999; 2001; 2003; 2005; 2007; 2009; 2011; 2013; 2015; 2017; 2019; 2021

India competed at the 2013 Summer Universiade in Kazan, Russia from 6 to 17 July 2013. 37 athletes are a part of the Indian contingent.

India has won 1 silver medal.

== Medalists ==
Medal	Name	Sport	Event	Date
Silver	Inderjeet Singh	Athletics	Shot Put	7 July
