= Iana Danilova =

Russian rugby sevens player

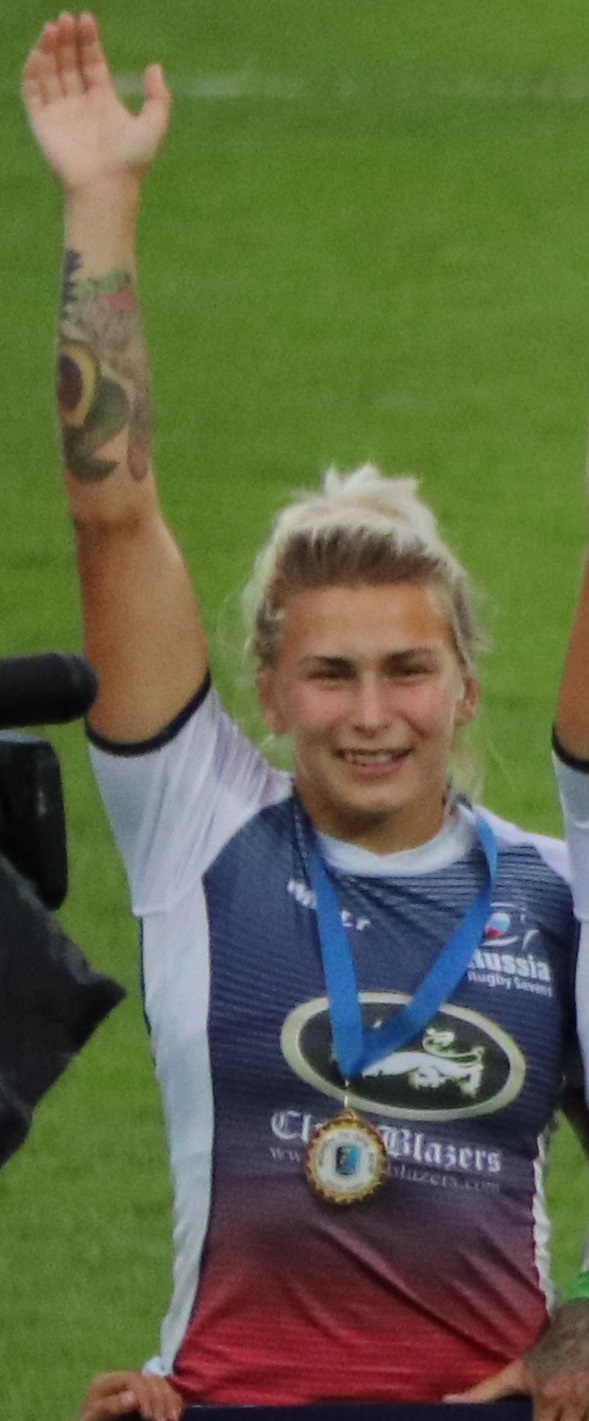
- Full name: Iana Andreyevna Danilova
- Born: 7 May 1996 (age 30) Tayga, Russia
- Height: 1.7 m (5 ft 7 in)
- Weight: 66 kg (146 lb)

Rugby union career
International career
Years	Team	Apps	(Points)
- Russia
National sevens team
Years	Team		Comps
2018–	Russia 7s		42

Iana Andreyevna Danilova (Russian: Яна Андреевна Данилова; born 7 May 1996) is a Russian rugby sevens player for VVA Podmoskovje club. She competed in the women's tournament at the 2020 Summer Olympics.
