= Anna Gushchina =

Russian judoka (born 1997)

Personal information
- Born: 5 May 1997 (age 29) Davydovo, Moscow Oblast, Russia
- Occupation: Judoka

Sport
- Country: Russia
- Sport: Judo
- Weight class: +78 kg
- Club: Arctic judo club (Noyabrsk, Yamalo-Nenets Autonomous Okrug)
Medal record
Women's judo
Representing Russia
World Championships
| Bronze medal – third place | 2019 Tokyo | Mixed team |
IJF Grand Prix
| Bronze medal – third place | 2018 Agadir | +78 kg |
| Bronze medal – third place | 2018 Antalya | +78 kg |
European Junior Championships
| Silver medal – second place | 2017 Maribor | +78 kg |
Summer Universiade
| Bronze medal – third place | 2019 Naples | +70 kg |

Profile at external databases
- IJF: 22444
- JudoInside.com: 44937
- Updated on 1 December 2022

Anna Gushchina (born 5 May 1997) is a Russian judoka.

Gushchina won a medal at the 2019 World Judo Championships, in the Mixed team event.
