= PalaSele =

Indoor sporting arena in Eboli, Italy

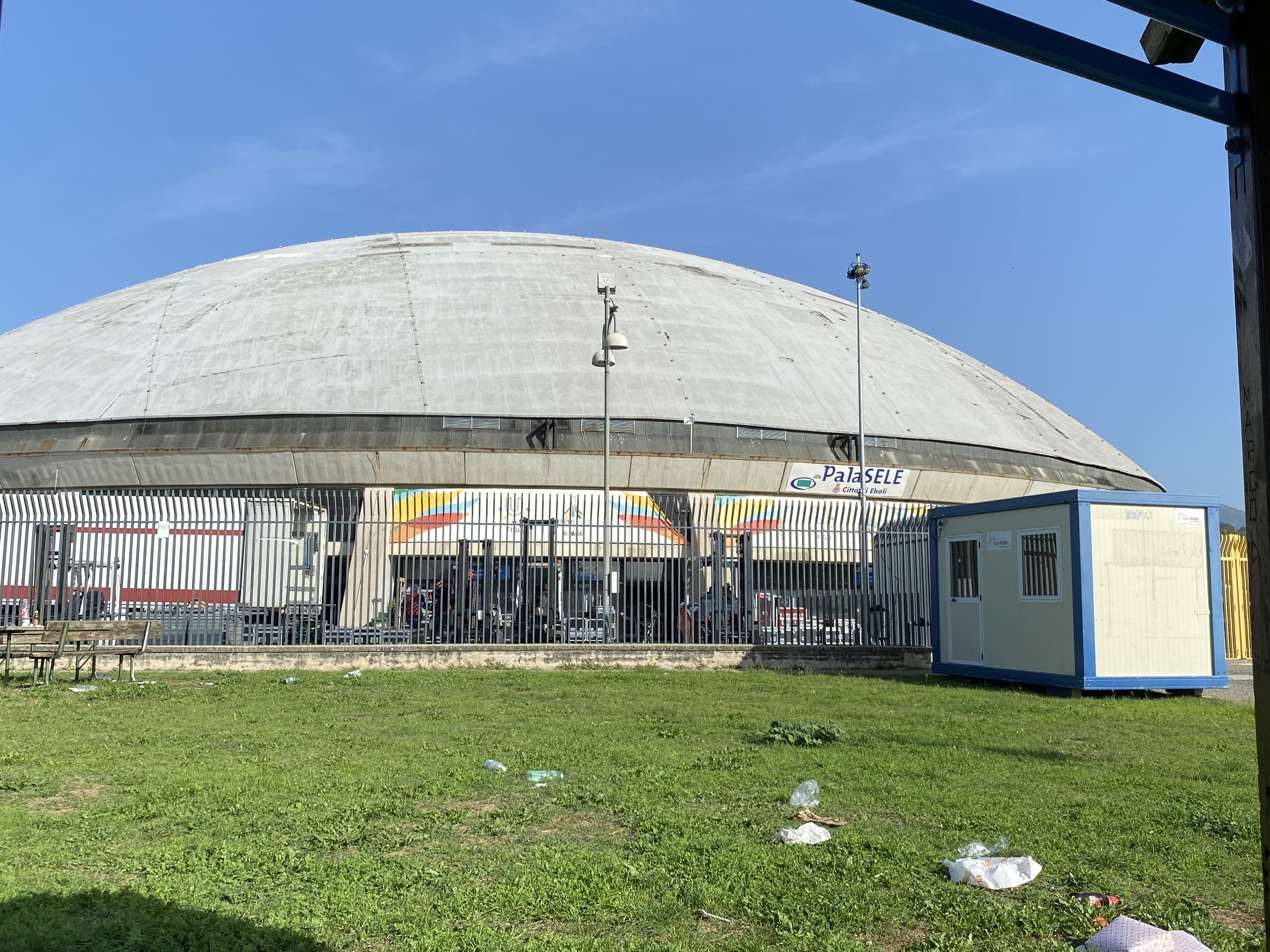
- Interactive map of PalaSele
- Location: Eboli, Italy
- Coordinates: 40.610996°N 15.058291°E
- Capacity: 8,000

PalaSele is an indoor sporting arena located in Eboli, Italy. The capacity of the arena is 8,000 spectators. It hosts indoor sporting events such as basketball and volleyball, and also hosts concerts.
