= Evgeniy Prokopchuk =

Russian judoka (born 1994)

Personal information
- Born: 24 March 1994 (age 32)
- Occupation: Judoka

Sport
- Country: Russia
- Sport: Judo
- Weight class: ‍–‍73 kg
Medal record
Men's judo
Representing Russia
World Championships
Bronze medal – third place	2019 Tokyo	Mixed team
IJF Grand Slam
Bronze medal – third place	2019 Ekaterinburg	‍–‍73 kg
Summer Universiade
Gold medal – first place	2019 Naples	‍–‍73 kg

Profile at external databases
- IJF: 34096
- JudoInside.com: 65261
- Updated on 21 November 2022

Evgeniy Prokopchuk (born 24 March 1994) is a Russian judoka.

Prokopchuk won a medal at the 2019 World Judo Championships.
