= Basketball at the 2019 Summer Universiade – Men's tournament =

Men's basketball at the XXX Summer Universiade
- Venue: various
- Dates: 3–11 July
- Teams: 16

Medalists
1st place, gold medalist(s)		United States (15th title)
2nd place, silver medalist(s)		Ukraine
3rd place, bronze medalist(s)		Australia

The men's tournament in basketball at the 2019 Summer Universiade in Naples, Italy was held from 3 to 11 July.

== Teams ==
Americas	Asia	Europe	Oceania
Argentina; Canada; Mexico; United States	China	Croatia; Czech Republic; Finland; Germany; Israel; Italy; Latvia; Norway; Russia; Ukraine	Australia

== Preliminary round ==
Qualified for the Final eight
Qualified for the Placement 9th-16th

=== Pool A ===
Team	Pld	W	L	PF	PA	PD	Pts
Israel	3	3	0	237	193	+44	6
Australia	3	2	1	257	213	+44	5
Czech Republic	3	1	2	186	212	−26	4
Mexico	3	0	3	193	255	−62	3

4 July 2019
10:30 UTC+2

Boxscore

Czech Republic	73–56	Mexico
Scoring by quarter: 20–15, 21–9, 19–14, 13–18

PalaJacazzi

4 July 2019
17:30 UTC+2

Boxscore

Israel	92–64	Australia
Scoring by quarter: 22–15, 17–14, 25–18, 28–17

PalaJacazzi

5 July 2019
10:30 UTC+2

Boxscore

Mexico	62–105	Australia
Scoring by quarter: 13–32, 16–25, 11–32, 22–16

PalaCercola

5 July 2019
20:00 UTC+2

Boxscore

Czech Republic	54–68	Israel
Scoring by quarter: 15–6, 11–19, 17–27, 11–16

PalaCercola

6 July 2019
17:30 UTC+2

Boxscore

Israel	77–75	Mexico
Scoring by quarter: 24–26, 20–11, 13–18, 20–20

Palasport Del Mauro

6 July 2019
20:00 UTC+2

Boxscore

Australia	88–59	Czech Republic
Scoring by quarter: 25–17, 21–10, 22–11, 20–21

Palasport Del Mauro

=== Pool B ===
Team	Pld	W	L	PF	PA	PD	Pts
Argentina	3	2	1	217	193	+24	5
Latvia	3	2	1	197	195	+2	5
Croatia	3	1	2	181	194	−13	4
Russia	3	1	2	193	206	−13	4

4 July 2019
10:30 UTC+2

Boxscore

Latvia	55–71	Argentina
Scoring by quarter: 18–20, 2–20, 22–15, 13–16

PalaCercola

4 July 2019
20:00 UTC+2

Boxscore

Croatia	58–54	Russia
Scoring by quarter: 15–10, 14–16, 8–16, 21–12
Pts: Škara 17; Rebs: Čolak, Jambrović 7 Asts: Rebić 4		Pts: Motovilov 13; Rebs: Doinikov 10; Asts: Motovilov, Pluzhnikov 2

PalaCercola
Referees: Paulo Marques (POR), Trevor Barss (CAN), Petr Hrůša (CZE)

5 July 2019
13:00 UTC+2

Boxscore

Argentina	80–84	Russia
Scoring by quarter: 24–30, 15–21, 21–19, 20–14
Pts: Vaulet 20; Rebs: Vaulet 8 Asts: Buemo 6		Pts: Afanasev 23; Rebs: Trubin 7 Asts: Pluzhnikov 3

Palasport Del Mauro
Referees: Grant Todey (USA), Péter Praksch (HUN), Zulfikar Oruzgani (GER)

5 July 2019
20:00 UTC+2

Boxscore

Latvia	74–69	Croatia
Scoring by quarter: 16–16, 18–19, 14–18, 26–16

Palasport Del Mauro

6 July 2019
17:30 UTC+2

Boxscore

Russia	55–68	Latvia
Scoring by quarter: 21–17, 19–14, 9–22, 6–15
Pts: Aginskikh 12; Rebs: Motovilov 5 Asts: Doinikov 6		Pts: Feikners 14; Rebs: Čavars 11; Asts: Birkāns 6

PalaBarbuto
Referees: Pavel Fuska (SVK), Nir Meirson (ISR), Alberto Achutegui (MEX)

6 July 2019
20:00 UTC+2

Boxscore

Croatia	54–66	Argentina
Scoring by quarter: 14–25, 17–14, 14–18, 9–9

PalaCercola

=== Pool C ===
Team	Pld	W	L	PF	PA	PD	Pts
United States	3	3	0	226	192	+34	6
Ukraine	3	2	1	244	187	+57	5
Finland	3	1	2	235	206	+29	4
China	3	0	3	199	319	−120	3

4 July 2019
10:30 UTC+2

Boxscore

China	64–115	Ukraine
Scoring by quarter: 24–28, 13–32, 9–28, 18–27

Palasport Del Mauro

4 July 2019
20:00 UTC+2

Boxscore

Finland	65–69	United States
Scoring by quarter: 11–21, 25–19, 11–9, 18–20

PalaBarbuto

5 July 2019
13:00 UTC+2

Boxscore

Ukraine	57–58	United States
Scoring by quarter: 16–18, 18–18, 6–15, 17–7

PalaBarbuto

5 July 2019
13:00 UTC+2

Boxscore

China	65–105	Finland
Scoring by quarter: 10–19, 23–25, 15–30, 17–31

PalaJacazzi

6 July 2019
17:30 UTC+2

Boxscore

United States	99–70	China
Scoring by quarter: 18–25, 29–19, 26–8, 26–18

PalaJacazzi

6 July 2019
20:00 UTC+2

Boxscore

Finland	65–72	Ukraine
Scoring by quarter: 18–13, 14–24, 10–13, 23–22

PalaJacazzi

=== Pool D ===
Team	Pld	W	L	PF	PA	PD	Pts
Canada	3	3	0	249	196	+53	6
Germany	3	2	1	208	190	+18	5
Italy	3	1	2	207	230	−23	4
Norway	3	0	3	161	209	−48	3

4 July 2019
10:30 UTC+2

Boxscore

Germany	66–43	Norway
Scoring by quarter: 22–12, 14–12, 18–6, 12–13

PalaBarbuto

4 July 2019
20:00 UTC+2

Boxscore

Canada	96–70	Italy
Scoring by quarter: 27–12, 25–24, 19–26, 25–8

Palasport Del Mauro

5 July 2019
20:00 UTC+2

Boxscore

Norway	53–70	Italy
Scoring by quarter: 18–21, 12–22, 13–10, 10–17

PalaBarbuto

5 July 2019
20:00 UTC+2

Boxscore

Germany	61–80	Canada
Scoring by quarter: 19–18, 14–9, 12–34, 16–19

PalaJacazzi

6 July 2019
17:30 UTC+2

Boxscore

Canada	73–65	Norway
Scoring by quarter: 14–18, 20–8, 13–18, 26–21

PalaCercola

6 July 2019
20:00 UTC+2

Boxscore

Italy	67–81	Germany
Scoring by quarter: 24–21, 14–17, 10–19, 19–24

PalaBarbuto

== 9th to 16th place classification ==
=== Bracket ===
13th place
Russia	91
China	76
15th place
Norway (OT)	79
Mexico	77

13–16th place semifinals
Russia	63
Norway	55
Mexico	70
China	75

9–16th place quarterfinals
A3	Czech Republic	91
B4	Russia	73
C3	Finland	62
D4	Norway	39
B3	Croatia	71
A4	Mexico	68
D3	Italy	95
C4	China	83

Semifinals
Czech Republic	57
Finland	74
Croatia	77
Italy	70

9th place
Finland	80
Croatia	78
11th place
Czech Republic	89
Italy	67

=== 9–16th place quarterfinals ===
8 July 2019
10:30 UTC+2

Boxscore

Czech Republic	91–73	Russia
Scoring by quarter: 17–17, 27–23, 23–16, 24–17
Pts: Peterka 18; Rebs: Peterka 14; Asts: Peterka, Tuma 4		Pts: Doinikov, Motovilov 17; Rebs: Doinikov 9 Asts: Motovilov 6

PalaBarbuto
Referees: Leonardo Zalazar (ARG), Zulfikar Oruzgani (GER), Nikola Bejat (NOR)

8 July 2019
10:30 UTC+2

Boxscore

Finland	62–39	Norway
Scoring by quarter: 21–8, 15–16, 11–11, 15–4

PalaCercola

8 July 2019
10:30 UTC+2

Boxscore

Croatia	71–68	Mexico
Scoring by quarter: 15–18, 20–14, 12–20, 24–16

PalaJacazzi

8 July 2019
10:30 UTC+2

Boxscore

Italy	95–83	China
Scoring by quarter: 23–22, 27–16, 19–28, 26–17

Palasport Del Mauro

=== 13–16th place semifinals ===
9 July 2019
17:30 UTC+2

Boxscore

Russia	63–55	Norway
Scoring by quarter: 13–12, 16–17, 15–10, 19–16
Pts: Motovilov, Pluzhnikov 14; Rebs: Doinikov 8 Asts: five players 2		Pts: Lorange 12; Rebs: Dyb Berg 9 Asts: Frey 9

PalaBarbuto
Referees: Nir Meirson (ISR), Pavel Fuska (SVK), Mora Gaitan (MEX)

9 July 2019
20:00 UTC+2

Boxscore

Mexico	70–75	China
Scoring by quarter: 23–13, 14–26, 15–14, 18–22

PalaCercola

=== 9–12th place semifinals ===
9 July 2019
20:00 UTC+2

Boxscore

Czech Republic	57–74	Finland
Scoring by quarter: 19–22, 14–8, 10–22, 14–22

PalaJacazzi

9 July 2019
20:00 UTC+2

Boxscore

Croatia	77–70	Italy
Scoring by quarter: 17–13, 18–19, 23–18, 19–20

PalaBarbuto

=== 15th place game ===
11 July 2019
10:30 UTC+2

Boxscore

Norway	79–77 (OT)	Mexico
Scoring by quarter: 18–20, 20–21, 9–17, 21–10, Overtime: 11–9

PalaCercola

=== 13th place game ===
11 July 2019
10:30 UTC+2

Boxscore

Russia	91–76	China
Scoring by quarter: 25–14, 15–25, 24–21, 27–16
Pts: Doinikov 25; Rebs: Aginskikh 7 Asts: Grekov, Sarattsev 3		Pts: Zhang 21; Rebs: Zhang 9 Asts: Yuan 5

PalaJacazzi
Referees: Jon Chapman (AUS), Alberto Achutegui (MEX), Micaela Prado (ARG)

=== 11th place game ===
11 July 2019
10:30 UTC+2

Boxscore

Czech Republic	89–67	Italy
Scoring by quarter: 30–15, 23–20, 18–12, 18–20

PalaBarbuto

=== 9th place game ===
11 July 2019
13:00 UTC+2

Boxscore

Finland	80–78	Croatia
Scoring by quarter: 16–23, 23–8, 22–23, 19–24

PalaCercola

== 1st to 8th place classification ==
=== Bracket ===
5th place
Germany	88
Canada	74
7th place
Latvia	61
Argentina	78

5–8th place semifinals
Latvia	52
Germany	74
Argentina	68
Canada	82

Quarterfinals
A1	Israel	96
B2	Latvia	57
C1	United States	76
D2	Germany	74
B1	Argentina	64
A2	Australia	73
D1	Canada	80
C2	Ukraine	82

Semifinals
Israel	73
United States	75
Australia	80
Ukraine	82

Gold medal match
United States	85
Ukraine	63
Bronze medal match
Israel	69
Australia	86

=== Quarterfinals ===
8 July 2019
17:30 UTC+2

Boxscore

Israel	96–57	Latvia
Scoring by quarter: 24–11, 24–7, 24–14, 24–25

PalaCercola

8 July 2019
17:30 UTC+2

Boxscore

United States	76–74	Germany
Scoring by quarter: 16–22, 17–20, 24–11, 19–21

Palasport Del Mauro

8 July 2019
20:00 UTC+2

Boxscore

Argentina	64–73	Australia
Scoring by quarter: 16–18, 17–17, 17–18, 19–20

PalaCercola

8 July 2019
20:00 UTC+2

Boxscore

Canada	80–82	Ukraine
Scoring by quarter: 18–13, 19–19, 13–27, 30–23

Palasport Del Mauro

=== 5–8th place semifinals ===
9 July 2019
17:30 UTC+2

Boxscore

Latvia	52–74	Germany
Scoring by quarter: 14–22, 11–16, 7–23, 20–13

PalaJacazzi

9 July 2019
17:30 UTC+2

Boxscore

Argentina	68–82	Canada
Scoring by quarter: 18–21, 24–15, 15–29, 11–17

PalaCercola

=== Semifinals ===
9 July 2019
17:30 UTC+2

Boxscore

Israel	73–75	United States
Scoring by quarter: 26–12, 15–29, 12–10, 20–24

Palasport Del Mauro

9 July 2019
20:00 UTC+2

Boxscore

Australia	80–82	Ukraine
Scoring by quarter: 21–23, 20–16, 20–21, 19–22

Palasport Del Mauro

=== 7th place game ===
11 July 2019
13:00 UTC+2

Boxscore

Latvia	61–78	Argentina
Scoring by quarter: 17–18, 18–21, 12–16, 14–23

PalaJacazzi

=== 5th place game ===
11 July 2019
13:00 UTC+2

Boxscore

Germany	88–74	Canada
Scoring by quarter: 25–13, 24–24, 21–18, 18–19

PalaBarbuto

=== Bronze medal game ===
11 July 2019
17:30 UTC+2

Boxscore

Israel	69–86	Australia (bronze)
Scoring by quarter: 9–24, 16–23, 23–15, 21–24
Pts: Carreira, Menco 16; Rebs: Menco 7 Asts: Brisker, Zalmanson 3		Pts: Vasiljevic 33; Rebs: J. White 9 Asts: Zunic 4

Palasport Del Mauro
Referees: Grant Todey (USA), Stanislav Valeev (RUS), Valerio Grigioni (ITA)

=== Gold medal game ===
11 July 2019
20:00 UTC+2

Boxscore

(gold) United States	85–63	Ukraine (silver)
Scoring by quarter: 28–15, 20–8, 16–18, 21–22
Pts: Newman 20; Rebs: Newman 7 Asts: Simms 3		Pts: Pavlov 15; Rebs: Pavlov 13; Asts: Zotov 4

Palasport Del Mauro
Referees: Zhang X. (CHN), Gatis Saliņš (LAT), Péter Praksch (HUN)

== Final standings ==
Place	Team	Record
1st place, gold medalist(s)	United States	6–0
2nd place, silver medalist(s)	Ukraine	4–2
3rd place, bronze medalist(s)	Australia	4–2
4	Israel	4–2
5	Germany	4–2
6	Canada	4–2
7	Argentina	3–3
8	Latvia	2–4
9	Finland	4–2
10	Croatia	3–3
11	Czech Republic	3–3
12	Italy	2–4
13	Russia	3–3
14	China	1–5
15	Norway	1–5
16	Mexico	0–6
