= Erdem Tsydypov =

Russian archer (born 1997)

Personal information
- Born: 30 May 1997 (age 29)

Sport
- Country: Russia
- Sport: Archery
Medal record
Men's archery
Representing Russia
European Indoor Championships
Bronze medal – third place	2022 Laško	Individual
Summer Universiade
Gold medal – first place	2019 Naples	Men's team
Silver medal – second place	2019 Naples	Individual
Military World Games
Gold medal – first place	2019 Wuhan	Mixed team
World Archery Youth Championships
Bronze medal – third place	2017 Rosario	Men's team

Erdem Tumenovych Tsydypov (Russian: Эрдэм Тумэнович Цыдыпов, born 30 May 1997) is a Russian archer. He won the bronze medal in the men's recurve event at the 2022 European Indoor Archery Championships held in Laško, Slovenia.

He represented Russia at the 2019 Summer Universiade held in Naples, Italy and he won the silver medal in the men's individual recurve event. He also won the gold medal in the mixed team event. In 2019, he also won the gold medal in the mixed team event at the Military World Games held in Wuhan, China, alongside Inna Stepanova.
