= Viktoriya Shkoda =

Russian association football player

Personal information
- Date of birth: 21 December 1999 (age 26)
- Place of birth: Krasnodar, Russia
- Height: 1.58 m (5 ft 2 in)
- Positions: Centre-back; right-back

Team information
- Current team: Kubanochka

Senior career*
Years	Team	Apps	(Gls)
2017–	Kubanochka	42	(2)

International career
2015–2016	Russia U17	11	(0)
2017–2018	Russia U19	17	(0)
2017–	Russia	3	(0)
- * Club domestic league appearances and goals as of 2:15, 28 June 2019 (UTC)

Viktoriya Shkoda (born 21 December 1999 in Krasnodar) is a Russian footballer who plays as a defender for Kubanochka Krasnodar at the Russian Women's Football Championship.

Shkoda played for Russian U17 and U19 teams. On 29 June 2017, she was included by coach Elena Fomina in the 23-players squad that represented Russia at the UEFA Women's Euro 2017, although she didn't play any of the team's matches in the competition. She played her first match for the national team on 7 July 2017, a friendly against Croatia.
