= Nasiba Gasanova =

Russian footballer (born 1994)

Personal information
- Full name: Nasiba Bakhruzovna Gasanova
- Date of birth: 15 December 1994 (age 31)
- Place of birth: Russia
- Height: 1.76 m (5 ft 9 in)
- Positions: Forward; wing-back

Team information
- Current team: Lokomotiv Moscow

Senior career*
| Years | Team | Apps | (Gls) |
| 2016–2020 | Kubanochka | 60 | (10) |
| 2020 | Krasnodar | 12 | (0) |
| 2021–2022 | Rostov | 42 | (1) |
| 2023– | Lokomotiv Moscow | 47 | (3) |

International career
| 2012–2013 | Russia U19 | 6 | (0) |
| 2017– | Russia | 9 | (0) |
- * Club domestic league appearances and goals as of 19 May 2025

Nasiba Bakhruzovna Gasanova (Russian: Насиба Бахрузовна Гасанова; born 15 December 1994) is a Russian footballer who plays as a wing-back and as a forward for Lokomotiv Moscow at the Russian Women's Football Championship.

Gasanova played for Russia U19 team. She was included by coach Elena Fomina in the 23-players squad that represented Russia at the UEFA Women's Euro 2017, although she didn't play any of the team's matches in the competition. After the tournament, Gasanova became an important part of the Russian team, featuring in several matches for the team.
