= Great Britain at the 2019 Summer Universiade =

- Flag of Great Britain
- IOC code: GBR

in Naples, Italy 3 July 2019 – 14 July 2019
- Medals Ranked 17th: Gold 3 Silver 3 Bronze 4 Total 10

Summer Universiade appearances
- 1959; 1961; 1963; 1965; 1967; 1970; 1973; 1975; 1977; 1979; 1981; 1983; 1985; 1987; 1989; 1991; 1993; 1995; 1997; 1999; 2001; 2003; 2005; 2007; 2009; 2011; 2013; 2015; 2017; 2019; 2021; 2025; 2027

Great Britain competed at the 2019 Summer Universiade in Naples, Italy held from 3 to 14 July 2019.

== Medal summary ==
=== Medal by sports ===
Medals by sport
Athletics	1	0	1	2
Diving	0	0	1	1
Swimming	2	2	2	6
Tennis	0	1	0	1

=== Medalists ===
Medal	Name	Sport	Event
Gold	Jessica Judd	Athletics	Women's 5000m
Gold	David Cumberlidge	Swimming	Men's 50m freestyle
Gold	Alicia Wilson	Swimming	Women's 200m individual medley
Silver	Joe Litchfield	Swimming	Men's 200m individual medley
Silver	Sarah Vasey	Swimming	Women's 50m breaststroke
Silver	Emily Arbuthnott	Tennis	Women's singles
Bronze	Taylor Campbell	Athletics	Men's hammer throw
Bronze	Gemma McArthur	Diving	Women's 10m platform
Bronze	Emily Barclay	Swimming	Women's 50m freestyle
Bronze	Chloe Golding	Swimming	Women's 200m backstroke
