= Poland at the 2019 Summer Universiade =

- IOC code: POL
- NOC: Polish Olympic Committee
- Website: http://www.pkol.pl/

in Naples, Italy 3 – 14 July 2019
- Competitors: 112 in 10 sports
- Flag bearer: Paweł Halaba
- Medals Ranked 15th: Gold 4 Silver 2 Bronze 9 Total 15

Summer Universiade appearances
- 1959; 1961; 1963; 1965; 1967; 1970; 1973; 1975; 1977; 1979; 1981; 1983; 1985; 1987; 1989; 1991; 1993; 1995; 1997; 1999; 2001; 2003; 2005; 2007; 2009; 2011; 2013; 2015; 2017; 2019; 2021; 2025; 2027

Poland participated at the 2019 Summer Universiade in Naples, Italy.
