= Switzerland at the 2019 Summer Universiade =

- Flag of Switzerland
- IOC code: SUI

in Naples, Italy 3 July 2019 – 14 July 2019
- Medals Ranked 22nd: Gold 2 Silver 1 Bronze 1 Total 4

Summer Universiade appearances
- 1959; 1961; 1963; 1965; 1967; 1970; 1973; 1975; 1977; 1979; 1981; 1983; 1985; 1987; 1989; 1991; 1993; 1995; 1997; 1999; 2001; 2003; 2005; 2007; 2009; 2011; 2013; 2015; 2017; 2019; 2021; 2025; 2027

Switzerland competed at the 2019 Summer Universiade in Naples, Italy held from 3 to 14 July 2019. The country won two gold medals, one silver medal and one bronze medal, all in athletics.

== Medal summary ==
=== Medal by sports ===
Medals by sport
Athletics	2	1	1	4
Total	2	1	1	4

=== Medalists ===
Medal	Name	Sport	Event	Date
Gold	Jonas Raess	Athletics	Men's 5000 metres	July 13
Gold	Salomé Kora; Sarah Atcho; Ajla Del Ponte; Samantha Dagry; Riccarda Dietsche	Athletics	Women's 4 × 100 metres relay	July 13
Silver	Ajla Del Ponte	Athletics	Women's 100 metres	July 9
Bronze	Caroline Agnou	Athletics	Women's heptathlon	July 12
