= Australia at the 2019 Summer Universiade =

- IOC code: AUS
- NOC: Australian Olympic Committee
- Website: corporate.olympics.com.au (in English)

in Naples, Italy 3 – 14 July 2019
- Competitors: 167 in 14 sports
- Medals Ranked 12th: Gold 6 Silver 5 Bronze 6 Total 17

Summer Universiade appearances (overview)
- 1967; 1970; 1973; 1975; 1977; 1979; 1981; 1983; 1985; 1987; 1989; 1991; 1993; 1995; 1997; 1999; 2001; 2003; 2005; 2007; 2009; 2011; 2013; 2015; 2017; 2019; 2021; 2025; 2027

Australia participated at the 2019 Summer Universiade, in Naples, Italy with 167 competitors in 14 sports.
