= India at the 2019 Summer Universiade =

- IOC code: IND
- National federation: Association of Indian Universities
- Website: http://www.pkol.pl/

in Naples, Italy 3 – 14 July 2019
- Competitors: 112 in 10 sports
- Flag bearer: Dutee Chand
- Medals Ranked 22nd: Gold 1 Silver 1 Bronze 2 Total 4

Summer Universiade appearances
- 1959; 1961; 1963; 1965; 1967; 1970; 1973; 1975; 1977; 1979; 1981; 1983; 1985; 1987; 1989; 1991; 1993; 1995; 1997; 1999; 2001; 2003; 2005; 2007; 2009; 2011; 2013; 2015; 2017; 2019; 2021

India has participated at the 2019 Summer Universiade in Naples, Italy.

Dutee Chand became the first Indian women sprinter to win gold at the Summer Universiade, clocking 11.32 seconds in the 100m race.
