= China at the 2019 Summer Universiade =

- Flag of China
- IOC code: CHN

in Naples, Italy 3 July 2019 – 14 July 2019
- Medals Ranked 3rd: Gold 22 Silver 13 Bronze 9 Total 44

Summer Universiade appearances (overview)
- 1979; 1981; 1983; 1985; 1987; 1989; 1991; 1993; 1995; 1997; 1999; 2001; 2003; 2005; 2007; 2009; 2011; 2013; 2015; 2017; 2019; 2021; 2025; 2027

China competed at the 2019 Summer Universiade in Naples, Italy held from 3 to 14 July 2019.

== Medal summary ==
=== Medal by sports ===
Medals by sport
Athletics	1	2	3	6
Diving	11	4	0	15
Shooting	1	1	0	2
Table tennis	7	5	3	15
Taekwondo	0	1	1	2
Tennis	2	0	2	4

=== Medalists ===
Medal	Name	Sport	Event	Date
Silver	Shan Yunyun	Taekwondo	Men's –67 kg (welterweight)	
Bronze	Ma Qun	Athletics	Men's javelin throw	July 11
Bronze	Wu Yichao	Taekwondo	Men's –63 kg (bantamweight)	
