= Archery at the 2019 Summer Universiade – Men's individual recurve =

Men's individual recurve at the XXX Summer Universiade
- Venues: Partenio Stadium, Royal Palace
- Dates: July 8, 2019 – July 13, 2019
- Competitors: 63 from 40 nations

Medalists
1st place, gold medalist(s)		Lee Woo-seok	South Korea
2nd place, silver medalist(s)		Erdem Tsydypov	Russia
3rd place, bronze medalist(s)		Yuta Ishii	Japan

The men's individual recurve archery competition at the 2019 Summer Universiade was held in the Partenio Stadium, Avellino, Italy and the Royal Palace in Caserta, Italy between July 8 and 13.

== Records ==
Prior to the competition, the world and Universiade records were as follows.

- 72 arrows ranking round

Category	Athlete	Record	Date	Place	Event
World record	(South Korea) Kim Woo-jin	700	5 August 2016	Rio de Janeiro, Brazil	2016 Summer Olympics
Universiade record	(South Korea) Lee Seung-yun	693	4 July 2015	Gwangju, South Korea	2015 Summer Universiade

== Ranking round ==
Qualified for Round of 32
Qualified for 1/24 Round
Qualified for 1/48 Round

The ranking round took place on 9 July 2019 to determine the seeding for the elimination rounds. It consisted of two rounds of 36 arrows, with a maximum score of 720.

Rank	Archer	1st Half	2nd Half	10s	Xs	Score	Notes
1	Woo Seok Lee (KOR)	340	332	31	10	672	
2	Erdem Tsydypov (RUS)	323	343	32	8	666	
3	Florian Faber (SUI)	323	336	26	5	659	
4	Dapeng Wang (CHN)	336	323	35	6	659	
5	Chun-Heng Wei (TPE)	337	321	32	12	658	
6	Yuta Ishii (JPN)	334	324	26	8	658	
7	Qi Xiangshuo (CHN)	326	332	35	10	658	
8	Dan Olaru (MDA)	326	330	26	9	656	
9	Yubin Nam (KOR)	327	329	23	7	656	
10	Christoph Breitbach (GER)	327	327	28	7	654	
11	Daisuke Tomatsu (JPN)	331	318	25	9	649	
12	Chih-Chun Tang (TPE)	327	322	20	11	649	
13	Lou Thirion (FRA)	322	325	23	4	647	
14	Hendra Purnama (INA)	325	321	25	7	646	
15	Dashnamjil Dorjsuren (MGL)	320	324	23	3	644	
16	Artem Ovchynnikov (UKR)	325	319	19	7	644	
17	Matthew Joseph Zumbo (USA)	321	322	19	4	643	
18	Adam Wyatt Heidt (USA)	325	317	19	6	642	
19	Damiaan Jeurissen (NED)	314	326	16	6	640	
20	Ken Sanchez Antoku (ESP)	319	320	19	4	639	
21	Beligto Tsynguev (RUS)	320	319	16	6	639	
22	Johannes Maier (GER)	322	316	24	10	638	
23	Daniel Castro Barcala (ESP)	316	322	22	9	638	
24	Artem Kostin (KAZ)	322	315	21	5	637	
25	Karel Neuwirth (CZE)	317	319	22	7	636	
26	Uttkarsh (IND)	312	324	19	4	636	
27	William Sydney Pike (GBR)	322	314	9	2	636	
28	Ivan Horvat (CRO)	325	310	25	9	635	
29	Arpad Banda (HUN)	318	315	18	4	633	
30	Ynus Sarmambetov (UZB)	318	313	16	7	631	
31	Ivan Kozhokar (UKR)	320	309	16	5	629	
32	Mateusz Ogrodowczyk (POL)	322	307	15	4	629	
33	Lovro Cerni (CRO)	320	306	19	7	626	
34	Constantinos Panagi (CYP)	315	310	19	9	625	
35	Alikhan Mustafin (KAZ)	318	306	15	6	624	
36	Ferdinand Delille (FRA)	319	304	19	9	623	
37	Sion Wei Xiang Teo (SGP)	318	305	13	5	623	
38	Ziga Ravnikar (SLO)	315	305	13	4	620	
39	Rok Bizjak (SLO)	318	200	16	3	618	
40	Oleg Lacutco (MDA)	320	297	17	3	617	
41	Miguel Alonso Achondo Mendoza (MEX)	309	308	14	2	617	
42	Michal Hlahulek (CZE)	309	307	12	4	616	
43	Chayse Martin (NZL)	325	290	12	4	615	
44	Vladimir Hurban (SVK)	307	305	12	2	612	
45	Nicholas D'Amour (ISV)	303	306	13	6	609	
46	Alberto Derek Alvarez Bandala (MEX)	306	303	13	4	608	
47	Michal Basiuras (POL)	299	309	18	7	608	
48	Muhammad Ikram Joni (MAS)	305	303	13	4	608	
49	Karl Kivilo (EST)	307	300	10	4	607	
50	Muhammad Hanif Wijaya (INA)	305	301	14	2	606	
51	Javlonbek Abdubakirov (UZB)	303	301	14	3	604	
52	Hong Xiang Jonas Lim (SGP)	306	297	18	5	603	
53	Muhammad Shaiffuddin Mood Kamro (MAS)	300	302	12	2	602	
54	Yashdeep Sanjay Bhoge (IND)	287	313	10	3	600	
55	Tinas Tisocco (ARG)	294	303	9	2	597	
56	Matteo Santi (ITA)	292	302	4	1	594	
57	James Gaze (AUS)	299	287	12	3	586	
58	Adrian Faber (SUI)	295	291	10	4	586	
59	Paolo Ralli (ITA)	287	299	7	3	586	
60	Allen Drei Raquipo (PHI)	284	290	6	0	574	
61	Thomas Pantelides (CYP)	278	276	10	5	554	
62	Martin Ostman (SWE)	279	273	6	2	552	
63	Jayson Mendoza (PHI)	218	241	1	0	459	

== Elimination round ==
=== Section 1 ===
1/48 Round
1	Woo Seok Lee (KOR)
Bye
33	Lovro Cerni (CRO)
Bye
Bye
32	Mateusz Ogrodowczyk (POL)
17	Matthew Joseph Zumbo (USA)
Bye
Bye
48	Muhammad Ikram Joni (MAS)
49	Karl Kivilo (EST)
Bye
Bye
16	Artem Ovchynnikov (UKR)

1/24 Round
1	Woo Seok Lee (KOR)
Bye
33	Lovro Cerni (CRO)	27	26	21	26	26	W
32	Mateusz Ogrodowczyk (POL)	22	26	25	28	25	L
17	Matthew Joseph Zumbo (USA)	27	27	28	29
48	Muhammad Ikram Joni (MAS)	24	27	27	23
49	Karl Kivilo (EST)	24	25	25	28	22
16	Artem Ovchynnikov (UKR)	26	24	28	27	26

Round of 32
1	Woo Seok Lee (KOR)	28	28	29
33	Lovro Cerni (CRO)	27	25	25
17	Matthew Joseph Zumbo (USA)	26	24	29	29	26
16	Artem Ovchynnikov (UKR)	28	25	26	29	26

Round of 16
1	Woo Seok Lee (KOR)	27	29	27	25	29
16	Artem Ovchynnikov (UKR)	28	28	26	27	27

=== Section 2 ===
1/48 Round
9	Yubin Nam (KOR)
Bye
57	James Gaze (AUS)	25	23	24
56	Matteo Santi (ITA)	27	25	29
41	Miguel Alonso Anchodndo Mendoza (MEX)
Bye
Bye
24	Artem Kostin (KAZ)
25	Karel Neuwirth (CZE)
Bye
Bye
40	Oleg Lacutco (MDA)
Bye
8	Dan Olaru (MDA)

1/24 Round
9	Yubin Nam (KOR)	28	28	26	28
56	Matteo Santi (ITA)	26	28	26	25
41	Miguel Alonso Anchondo Mendoza (MEX)	28	27	18	28
24	Artem Kostin (KAZ)	25	26	28	26
25	Karel Neuwirth (CZE)	26	28	25	26
40	Oleg Lacutco (MDA)	29	27	26	27
Bye
8	Dan Olaru (MDA)

Round of 32
9	Yubin Nam (KOR)	29	29	30	30
41	Miguel Alonso Anchondo Mendoza (MEX)	29	25	27	25
40	Oleg Lacutco (MDA)	25	27	24
8	Dan Olaru (MDA)	28	28	28

Round of 16
9	Yubin Nam (KOR)	29	30	29
8	Dan Olaru (MDA)	25	29	28

=== Section 3 ===
1/48 Round
5	Chun-Heng Wei (KOR)
Bye
37	Sion Wei Xiang Teo (SGP)
Bye
Bye
28	Ivan Horvat (CRO)
21	Beligto Tsynguev (RUS)
Bye
Bye
44	Vladimir Hurban (SVK)
53	Muhammad Shaiffuddin Mohd Kamro (MAS)	20	26	29
60	Allen Drei Raquipo (PHI)	17	20	24
Bye
12	Chih-Chun Tang (TPE)

1/24 Round
5	Chung-Heng Wei (TPE)
Bye
37	Sion Wei Xiang Teo (SGP)	27	23	27	26
28	Ivan Horvat (CRO)	27	23	24	25
21	Beligto Tsynguev (RUS)	26	27	27
44	Vladimir Hurban (SVK)	25	25	26
53	Muhammad Shaiffuddin Mohd Kamro (MAS)	20	20	24
12	Chih-Chun Tang (TPE)	27	25	25

Round of 32
5	Chun-Heng Wei (TPE)	26	26	29
37	Sion Wei Xiang Teo (SGP)	21	24	26
21	Beligto Tsynguev (RUS)	28	26	27	27
12	Chih-Chun Tang (TPE)	27	26	25	27

Round of 16
5	Chun-Heng Wei (TPE)	29	28	30
8	Beligto Tsynguev (RUS)	27	26	27

=== Section 4 ===
1/48 Round
13	Lou Thirion (FRA)
Bye
61	Thomas Pantelides (CYP)	23	24	23
52	Hong Xiang Jonas Lim (SGP)	28	27	24
45	Nicholas D'Amour (ISV)
Bye
Bye
20	Ken Sanchez Antoku (ESP)
29	Arpad Banda (HUN)
Bye
Bye
36	Ferdiand Delille (FRA)
Bye
4	Dapeng Wang (CHN)

1/24 Round
13	Lou Thirion (FRA)	27	27	28
52	Hong Xiang Jonas Lim (SGP)	24	23	22
45	Nicholas D'Amour (ISV)	23	25	23
20	Ken Sanchez Antoku (ESP)	29	26	26
29	Arpad Banda (HUN)	24	26	30	27
36	Ferdinand Delille (FRA)	28	24	26	26
Bye
4	Dapeng Wang (CHN)

Round of 32
13	Lou Thirion (FRA)	26	29	25	26
20	Ken Sanchez Antoku (ESP)	28	29	27	28
29	Arpad Banda (HUN)	26	27	25	28	28
4	Dapend Wang (CHN)	28	23	28	27	23

Round of 16
20	Ken Sanchez Antoku (ESP)	28	27	30	28
29	Arpad Banda (HUN)	24	26	30	27

=== Section 5 ===
1/48 Round
3	Florian Faber (SUI)
Bye
35	Alikhan Mustafin (KAZ)
Bye
Bye
30	Ynus Sarmambetov (UZB)
19	Damiaan Jeurissen (NED)
Bye
Bye
46	Alberto Derek Alvarez Bandala (MEX)
51	Javlonbek Abdubakirov (UZB)	21	24	23	25	23	W
62	Martin Ostman (SWE)	26	24	26	23	17	L
Bye
14	Hendra Purnama (INA)

1/24 Round
3	Florian Faber (SUI)
Bye
35	Alikhan Mustafin (KAZ)	23	22	27	27	27
30	Ynus Sarmambetov (UZB)	26	25	26	24	25
19	Damiaan Jeurissen (NED)	24	24	26	27
46	Alberto Derek Alvarez Bandala (MEX)	27	26	23	28
51	Javlonbek Abdubakirov (UZB)	26	22	24
14	Hendra Purnama (INA)	29	25	27

Round of 32
3	Florian Faber (SUI)	24	26	25	25
35	Alikhan Mustafin (KAZ)	25	24	26	27
46	Alberto Derek Alvarez Bandala (MEX)	27	25	24	24
14	Hendra Purnama (INA)	30	23	28	28

Round of 16
35	Alikhan Mustafin (KAZ)	25	27	29	26	29
14	Hendra Purnama (INA)	28	26	28	27	26

=== Section 6 ===
1/48 Round
11	Daisuke Tomatsu (JPN)
Bye
59	Paolo Ralli (ITA)	26	23	26	24	23
54	Yashdeep Sanjay Bhoge (IND)	23	24	25	28	26
43	Chayse Martin (NZL)
Bye
Bye
22	Johannes Maier (GER)
27	William Sydney Pike (GBR)
Bye
Bye
38	Ziga Ravnikar (SLO)
Bye
6	Yuta Ishii (JPN)

1/24 Round
11	Daisuke Tomatsu (JPN)	30	28	26	29
54	Yashdeep Sanjay Bhoge (IND)	22	24	28	28
43	Chayse Martin (NZL)	28	25	27	24	20
22	Johannes Maier (GER)	26	29	25	26	30
27	William Sydney Pike (GBR)	27	23	29	27	28
38	Ziga Ravnikar (FRA)	27	25	26	27	24
Bye
6	Yuta Ishii (JPN)

Round of 32
11	Daisuke Tomatsu (JPN)	27	26	24	24
22	Johannes Maier (GER)	26	28	26	28
27	William Sydney Pike (GBR)	29	26	29	26	26
6	Yuta Ishii (JPN)	29	28	28	28	29

Round of 16
22	Johannes Maier (GER)	25	26	29	26	27	L
6	Yuta Ishii (JPN)	26	26	38	26	27	W

=== Section 5 ===
1/48 Round
7	Xiangshuo Qi (CHN)
Bye
39	Rok Bizjak (SLO)
Bye
Bye
26	Uttkarsh (IND)
23	Daniel Castro Barcala (ESP)
Bye
Bye
42	Michal Hlahulek (CZE)
55	Tomas Tisocco (ARG)	21	27	20	26	22	W
58	Adrian Faber (SUI)	27	27	27	22	21	L
Bye
10	Christoph Breitbach (GER)

1/24 Round
7	Xiangshuo Qi (CHN)
Bye
39	Rok Bizjak (SLO)	25	25	27	25	28
26	Uttkarsh (IND)	26	24	27	25	26
23	Daniel Castro Barcala (ESP)	25	27	27	25	28
46	Michal Hlahulek (CZE)	25	25	24	27	27
55	Thomas Tisocco (ARG)	23	26	23	26	20
10	Christoph Breitbach (GER)	28	26	28	25	29

Round of 32
3	Xiangshuo Qi (CHN)	30	28	26	28
39	Rok Bizjak (SLO)	27	28	19	25
23	Daniel Castro Barcala (ESP)	26	27	28	26	28
10	Christoph Breitbach (INA)	26	25	29	27	24

Round of 16
7	Xiangshuo Qi (CHN)	29	23	25	26	28	W
10	Christoph Breitbach (INA)	26	26	26	25	28

=== Section 8 ===
1/48 Round
15	Dashnamjil Dorjsuren (MGL)
Bye
63	Jayson Mendoza (PHI)	19	21	16
50	Muhammad Hanif Wijaya (INA)	26	27	21
47	Michal Basiuras (POL)
Bye
Bye
18	Adam Wyatt Heidt (USA)
31	Ivan Kozhokar (UKR)
Bye
Bye
34	Constantinos Panagi (CYP)
Bye
2	Erdem Tsydypov (RUS)

1/24 Round
15	Dashnamjil Dorjsuren (MGL)	26	26	24	27
50	Muhammad Hanif Wijaya (INA)	21	27	26	28
47	Michal Basiuras (POL)	27	24	26	27	24
18	Adam Wyatt Heidt (USA)	27	28	24	24	22
31	Ivan Kozhokar (UKR)	27	27	27	28	27
34	Constantinos Panagi (CYP)	24	28	27	24	27
Bye
2	Erdem Tsydypov (RUS)

Round of 32
50	Muhammad Hanif Wijaya (INA)	28	28	23	22	28
47	Michal Basiuras (POL)	28	22	24	29	28
31	Ivan Kozhokar (UKR)	26	26	23	27	26
6	Erdem Tsydypov (RUS)	25	26	27	28	29

Round of 16
47	Michal Basiuras (POL)	25	27	21	16
2	Erdem Tsydypov (RUS)	27	27	27	27

=== Final Rounds ===
Quarterfinals
1	Woo Seok Lee (KOR)	28	30	29	26	24	W
9	Yubin Nam (KOR)	28	28	27	28	27	L
5	Chun-Heng Wei (TPE)	29	29	27	29	25
20	Ken Sanchez Antoku (ESP)	28	29	28	27	16
35	Alikhan Mustafin (KAZ)	26	30	27	26
6	Yuta Ishii (JPN)	29	26	28	29
7	Xiangshuo Qi (CHN)	26	28	26
2	Erdem Tsydypov (RUS)	28	30	29

Semifinals
1	Woo Seok Lee (KOR)	28	27	26	29
5	Chun-Heng Wei (TPE)	27	25	29	28
6	Yuta Ishii (JPN)	26	29	27	29	27
2	Erdem Tsydypov (RUS)	27	26	28	26	28

Final
1	Woo Seok Lee (KOR)	27	29	28	28
2	Erdem Tsydypov (RUS)	26	27	30	27
Bronze Medal
5	Chun-Heng Wei (TPE)	29	24	26	28	25
6	Yuta Ishii (JPN)	29	27	28	24	25
