= Gymnastics at the 2019 Summer Universiade =

Gymnastics at the XXX Summer Universiade
- Venues: PalaVesuvio
- Dates: 3–7 July (artistic); 11–13 July (rhythmic)

Artistic gymnastics was contested at the 2019 Summer Universiade from July 3 to 7, and rhythmic gymnastics was contested from July 11 to 13. Both events were held at the PalaVesuvio in Naples, Italy.

== Combinated Medal table ==
* Host nation (Italy)

Rank	Nation	Gold	Silver	Bronze	Total
1	Russia	8	6	7	21
2	Japan	7	2	6	15
3	Chinese Taipei	2	1	1	4
4	Ukraine	1	3	2	6
5	Italy*	1	2	1	4
6	Azerbaijan	1	2	0	3
7	Armenia	1	0	0	1
7	South Korea	1	0	0	1
9	Belarus	0	3	0	3
10	Kazakhstan	0	2	0	2
11	Turkey	0	1	1	2
12	Austria	0	1	0	1
13	Brazil	0	0	1	1
13	Estonia	0	0	1	1
13	United States	0	0	1	1
Totals (15 entries)		22	23	21	66

== Artistic gymnastics ==
=== Men's events ===
Event	Gold	Silver	Bronze
Team all-around	Japan (JPN); Kazuma Kaya; Kakeru Tanigawa; Wataru Tanigawa	Chinese Taipei (TPE); Hsu Ping-chien; Lee Chih-kai; Tang Chia-hung	Russia (RUS); Ilya Kibartas; Kirill Prokopev; Ivan Stretovich
Individual all-around	Kazuma Kaya; Japan	Ivan Stretovich; Russia	Lee Chih-kai; Chinese Taipei
Floor	Kirill Prokopev; Russia	Kazuma Kaya; Japan	Kakeru Tanigawa; Japan
Pommel horse	Lee Chih-kai; Chinese Taipei	Nariman Kurbanov; Kazakhstan	Kazuma Kaya; Japan
Rings	Artur Avetisyan; Armenia	Vinzenz Höck; Austria İbrahim Çolak; Turkey	—
Vault	Kim Han-sol; South Korea	Yahor Sharamkou; Belarus	Luís Guilherme Porto; Brazil
Parallel bars	Kakeru Tanigawa; Japan	Ivan Stretovich; Russia	Ahmet Önder; Turkey
Horizontal bar	Tang Chia-hung; Chinese Taipei	Milad Karimi; Kazakhstan	Ivan Stretovich; Russia

=== Women's events ===
Event	Gold	Silver	Bronze
Team all-around	Japan (JPN); Hitomi Hatakeda; Aiko Sugihara; Asuka Teramoto	Russia (RUS); Lilia Akhaimova; Tatiana Nabieva; Ulyana Perebinosova	Italy (ITA); Carlotta Ferlito; Lara Mori; Martina Rizzelli
Individual all-around	Hitomi Hatakeda; Japan	Ulyana Perebinosova; Russia	Lilia Akhaimova; Russia
Vault	Marina Nekrasova; Azerbaijan	Lilia Akhaimova; Russia	Tatiana Nabieva; Russia
Uneven bars	Hitomi Hatakeda; Japan	Tatiana Nabieva; Russia	Asuka Teramoto; Japan
Balance beam	Hitomi Hatakeda; Japan	Lara Mori; Italy	Ulyana Perebinosova; Russia
Floor	Carlotta Ferlito; Italy	Aiko Sugihara; Japan	Ulyana Perebinosova; Russia

== Medalists ==
=== Medal table ===
* Host nation (Italy)

Rank	Nation	Gold	Silver	Bronze	Total
1	Japan	7	2	3	12
2	Chinese Taipei	2	1	1	4
3	Russia	1	6	6	13
4	Italy*	1	1	1	3
5	Armenia	1	0	0	1
5	Azerbaijan	1	0	0	1
5	South Korea	1	0	0	1
8	Kazakhstan	0	2	0	2
9	Turkey	0	1	1	2
10	Austria	0	1	0	1
10	Belarus	0	1	0	1
12	Brazil	0	0	1	1
Totals (12 entries)		14	15	13	42

=== Rhythmic gymnastics ===
==== Individual ====
Event	Gold	Silver	Bronze
Individual all-around	Ekaterina Selezneva; Russia	Zohra Aghamirova; Azerbaijan	Laura Zeng; United States
Individual hoop	Ekaterina Selezneva; Russia	Julia Evchik; Belarus	Yeva Meleshchuk; Ukraine
Individual ball	Ekaterina Selezneva; Russia	Julia Evchik; Belarus	Viktoria Bogdanova; Estonia
Individual clubs	Yeva Meleshchuk; Ukraine	Zohra Aghamirova; Azerbaijan	Ekaterina Selezneva; Russia
Individual ribbon	Ekaterina Selezneva; Russia	Alessia Russo; Italy	Yeva Meleshchuk; Ukraine

==== Group ====
Event	Gold	Silver	Bronze
Group all-around	Russia (RUS); Alina Alieva; Elina Baruzdina; Marina Kozlova; Valeriia Rusina; Angelina Shkatova	Ukraine (UKR); Olena Diachenko; Viktoriia Fotiieva; Valeriya Khanina; Daria Murai; Anastasiya Voznyak	Japan (JPN); Miyu Kawata; Misuzu Kishimoto; Mebae Maruyama; Aoi Tsukahara; Haruna Yamawaki
Group 5 balls	Russia (RUS); Alina Alieva; Elina Baruzdina; Marina Kozlova; Valeriia Rusina; Angelina Shkatova	Ukraine (UKR); Olena Diachenko; Viktoriia Fotiieva; Valeriya Khanina; Daria Murai; Anastasiya Voznyak	Japan (JPN); Miyu Kawata; Misuzu Kishimoto; Mebae Maruyama; Aoi Tsukahara; Haruna Yamawaki
Group 3 hoops + 4 clubs	Russia (RUS); Alina Alieva; Elina Baruzdina; Marina Kozlova; Valeriia Rusina; Angelina Shkatova	Ukraine (UKR); Olena Diachenko; Viktoriia Fotiieva; Valeriya Khanina; Daria Murai; Anastasiya Voznyak	Japan (JPN); Miyu Kawata; Misuzu Kishimoto; Mebae Maruyama; Aoi Tsukahara; Haruna Yamawaki

=== Medal table ===
* Host nation (Italy)

Rank	Nation	Gold	Silver	Bronze	Total
1	Russia	7	0	1	8
2	Ukraine	1	3	2	6
3	Azerbaijan	0	2	0	2
3	Belarus	0	2	0	2
5	Italy*	0	1	0	1
6	Japan	0	0	3	3
7	Estonia	0	0	1	1
7	United States	0	0	1	1
Totals (8 entries)		8	8	8	24

== Men's Artistic Events ==
=== Team ===
Team	Floor (gymnastics)		Pommel horse		Rings (gymnastics)		Vault (gymnastics)		Parallel bars		Horizontal bar		Total (All-around)	
Team	Score	Rank	Score	Rank	Score	Rank	Score	Rank	Score	Rank	Score	Rank	Score	Rank
Japan	29.525	1	27.850	2	28.750	1	28.400	3	29.400	1	28.925	1	172.850	1st place, gold medalist(s)
Kazuma Kaya (JPN)	14.800	2	14.800	2	14.300	6	14.000	16	14.450	3	14.250	5	86.600	1
Kakeru Tanigawa (JPN)	14.725	3	13.050	19	13.950	11	13.600	28	14.950	1	14.625	2	84.900	2
Wataru Tanigawa (JPN)	14.350	5	12.450	29	14.450	4	14.400	6	14.450	4	14.300	3	84.400	3
Chinese Taipei	26.650	7	28.300	1	27.550	3	28.000	4	28.050	3	28.050	2	167.400	2nd place, silver medalist(s)
Hsu Ping-chien (TPE)	12.800	35	12.300	31	13.050	34	14.100	13	12.850	33	13.350	15	78.450	23
Lee Chih-kai (TPE)	13.850	10	15.150	1	13.300	25	14.700	2	14.400	5	12.400	36	83.800	4
Tang Chia-hung (TPE)			13.150	14	14.250	7			13.650	16	14.700	1		
Russia	28.950	2	26.150	6	27.200	5	28.900	2	27.400	6	27.900	3	166.500	3rd place, bronze medalist(s)
Ilya Kibartas (RUS)	12.750	37	13.150	16	13.600	18								
Kirill Prokopev (RUS)	15.100	1	13.000	21	13.600	16	14.500	3	13.000	30	13.600	11	82.850	5
Ivan Stretovich (RUS)	13.850	11	12.350	30	13.450	20	14.400	5	14.400	6	14.250	4	82.700	6
Italy	27.450	4	26.700	5	28.025	2	27.600	5	28.150	2	27.000	4	164.925	4
Stefano Patron (ITA)	13.400	22	13.650	6	13.200	28	13.950	17	14.050	9	13.300	18	81.550	10
Andrea Russo (ITA)	14.050	8	13.050	18	13.975	10	13.650	27	14.000	11	13.700	9	82.425	7
Marco Sarrugerio (ITA)	13.200	25	11.700	40	14.050	9	12.450	48	14.100	8	13.150	25	78.650	21
South Korea	27.950	3	26.850	3	27.450	4	28.950	1	27.500	5	25.900	6	164.600	5
Kim Han-sol (KOR)	14.250	7	12.450	28	13.600	17	14.750	1	13.250	26	12.850	30	81.150	11
Lee Jung-hyo (KOR)	13.700	14	13.650	7	13.850	14	14.200	10	13.900	13	12.350	38	81.650	9
Lee Seung-min (KOR)	13.350	24	13.200	12	12.800	40	12.800	42	13.600	17	13.050	27	78.800	19
France	27.300	5	25.500	7	26.100	7	27.100	8	27.700	4	26.925	5	159.625	6
Antoine Borello (FRA)	13.800	13	12.250	32	12.950	36	12.500	46	14.000	10	13.850	7	79.350	16
Killian Mermet (FRA)	13.500	17	12.800	23	12.450	47	13.900	19	13.700	15	13.000	28	79.350	17
Antoine Pochon (FRA)			12.700	25	13.150	29	13.200	35	12.800	35	13.075	26		
Canada	26.900	6	26.750	4	25.950	8	27.350	6	23.875	8	25.425	7	156.250	7
Jeremy Bartholomeusz (CAN)	13.050	27	13.350	9	12.800	38	13.900	19	10.900	49	13.125	24	77.125	29
Jacob Bonnay (CAN)	13.450	20	13.400	8			13.450	31	12.975	31	12.300	40		
Damien Cachia (CAN)	13.450	19			13.150	31								
Australia	25.700	8	25.400	8	26.650	6	27.200	7	25.400	7	25.350	8	154.700	8
Hudson Irwin (AUS)	12.300	41	11.450	43	12.200	51	12.150	49	12.400	38	12.500	35	73.000	36
Heath Thorpe (AUS)	12.850	33	11.400	44	11.500	55	14.100	13	12.100	39	12.850	31	74.800	33
Michael Tone (AUS)	12.850	31	13.950	5	13.450	21	13.100	37	13.000	29	12.350	37	78.700	20
Individual
Ivo Chiapponi (ARG)	12.900	29	10.550	51	12.200	50	12.450	47	11.850	43	12.300	39	72.250	37
Julian Jato (ARG)	12.800	34	11.600	42	12.800	39	12.900	40	13.500	20	12.650	33	76.250	31
Artur Avertisyan (ARM)					14.750	2								
Alexander Benda (AUT)	12.900	30	12.000	35	12.200	49	13.650	26	13.250	24	13.300	19	77.300	27
Vinzenz Höck (AUT)	12.500	38	11.700	40	14.450	3	13.900	19	13.000	28	13.100	25	78.650	22
Ivan Tikhonov (AZE)	13.850	11	13.150	15	13.400	23	13.750	23	13.900	12	12.050	45	80.100	14
Maxime Gentges (BEL)	13.550	16	10.425	53	13.400	22	13.200	36	13.550	18	13.350	17	77.475	25
Justin Pesesse (BEL)	12.850	32	11.000	49	13.150	30	14.250	9	12.850	34	13.150	23	77.250	28
Sviataslau Dranitski (BLR)	11.450	47	11.300	47	12.700	41	13.550	30	10.400	50	11.950	47	71.350	38
Yahor Sharamkou (BLR)	12.800	36	11.350	46			14.300	8						
Fellipe Ferreira (BRA)			11.850	38	13.250	27			12.075	40	13.700	9		
Luís Guilherme Porto (BRA)	13.500	17	13.000	20	13.500	19	14.350	7	13.400	21	12.600	34	80.350	13
Marko Jovicic (CRO)	12.275	43												
Leonardo Kusan (CRO)			12.850	23										
Neofytos Kyriakou (CYP)	11.850	44					12.800	17			9.950	50		
Tom Nicolaou (CYP)	13.400	22	12.200	34	13.100	33	14.100	15	11.900	41	11.900	48	76.600	30
Jacob Buus (DEN)											13.350	16		
Luca La Pia (DEN)	11.700	45					13.850	16						
Franz Card (FIN)	11.500	46	11.050	48	12.550	44	12.800	41	12.900	32	13.200	20	74.000	35
Joonas Kukkonen (FIN)					13.400	24								
Milad Karimi (KAZ)	14.550	4	13.100	17	13.050	35	13.100	37	14.150	7	14.250	6	82.200	8
Nariman Kurbanov (KAZ)			14.400	3										
Fabián de Luna (MEX)	12.350	40	11.350	45	13.900	12	14.200	11	13.300	23	12.250	41	77.350	26
Nikolai Nilsen Roenbeck (NOR)	12.950	28	11.775	39	12.000	53	13.300	15	11.650	44				
Harvey Humber (NZL)			8.400	54			12.700	20			12.700	32		
Batuhan Yazici (NZL)			8.250	55	11.800	54			11.000	47	12.050	44		
Bernardo Almeida (POR)	13.150	35	12.500	27	12.600	43	13.300	34	13.150	27	13.200	21	77.900	24
Guilherme Campos (POR)	10.200	50	10.500	52	12.650	42	13.700	24	11.550	45	12.150	43	70.750	39
Robert Ghiuzan (ROU)	10.600	49			12.100	52	13.600	7	11.000	48	10.650	49		
Roland Modoianu (ROU)	12.350	39	12.200	33	12.300	48	13.300	33	12.650	37	12.250	42	75.050	32
Luka Bojanc (SLO)					12.500	46								
Martino Morosi (SUI)	13.600	15	11.975	37	13.100	32	13.900	18	12.750	36	13.550	13	78.875	18
Marco Walter (SUI)	14.250	6	12.750	24	13.250	26	14.500	3	13.500	19	12.875	29	81.125	12
İbrahim Çolak (TUR)					14.850	1			13.800	14				
Ahmet Onder (TUR)			13.350	10	14.250	8			14.800	2	13.825	8		
Vladyslav Hryko (UKR)	12.275	42	13.250	11	13.800	15	13.700	25	13.250	25	13.450	14	79.725	15
Eduard Yermakov (UKR)	11.300	48	10.950	50	13.875	13	12.700	44	13.350	22	12.000	46	74.175	34
Alexander Diab (USA)	13.925	9			14.350	5	14.150	12			13.600	12		
Stephen Nedoroscik (USA)			13.200	13										
Rasuljon Abdurakhimov (UZB)			12.600	26	12.500	45			11.850	43				
Abdulla Azimov (UZB)	13.400	21	14.150	4	12.900	37			11.550	46				

=== All-around ===
Rank	Athlete	Floor (gymnastics)	Pommel horse	Rings (gymnastics)	Vault (gymnastics)	Parallel bars	Horizontal bar	Total
1st place, gold medalist(s)	Kazuma Kaya (JPN)	14.450	14.600	14.600	14.300	15.050	14.000	87.000
2nd place, silver medalist(s)	Ivan Stretovich (RUS)	14.000	14.075	13.600	14.400	14.250	14.050	84.375
3rd place, bronze medalist(s)	Lee Chih-kai (TPE)	14.250	15.225	13.150	14.225	13.850	13.250	83.950
4	Kakeru Tanigawa (JPN)	14.200	13.425	14.050	14.350	14.850	12.850	83.725
5	Milad Karimi (KAZ)	14.250	12.900	13.150	14.500	14.350	14.000	83.150
6	Lee Jung-hyo (KOR)	12.400	14.350	14.050	14.200	14.150	13.300	82.450
7	Andrea Russo (ITA)	14.050	12.750	14.000	13.750	13.600	13.650	81.800
8	Vladyslav Hryko (UKR)	12.600	13.750	13.600	13.800	14.200	13.300	81.250
9	Stefano Patron (ITA)	13.050	13.100	13.200	13.850	14.000	13.250	80.450
10	Kirill Prokopev (RUS)	14.800	12.550	13.400	14.100	13.475	11.800	80.125
11	Ivan Tikhonov (AZE)	14.200	13.400	12.700	13.750	12.300	13.250	79.600
12	Killian Mermet (FRA)	13.550	12.600	12.250	14.050	13.850	12.800	79.100
13	Michael Tone (AUS)	13.100	12.800	13.525	13.600	12.900	12.875	78.800
14	Hsu Ping-chien (TPE)	12.950	13.575	11.800	14.250	12.750	13.100	78.425
15	Lee Seung-min (KOR)	12.250	13.200	12.000	13.850	13.500	13.200	78.000
16	Martino Morosi (SUI)	12.650	11.100	12.900	13.850	12.000	13.400	75.900
17	Antoine Borello (FRA)	12.750	11.000	12.800	13.750	13.750	11.750	75.800
18	Luis Guilherme Porto (BRA)	12.650	11.450	12.850	14.250	12.050	12.200	75.450

=== Floor ===
Rank	Athlete	Score			Total
Rank	Athlete	D Score	E Score	Pen.	Total
1st place, gold medalist(s)	Kirill Prokopev (RUS)	6.200	8.750		14.950
2nd place, silver medalist(s)	Kazuma Kaya (JPN)	5.800	8.800		14.600
3rd place, bronze medalist(s)	Kakeru Tanigawa (JPN)	5.900	8.650		14.550
4	Kim Han-sol (KOR)	6.000	8.550		14.550
5	Marco Walter (SUI)	5.700	8.450		14.150
6	Alexander Diab (USA)	5.600	8.050		13.650
7	Milad Karimi (KAZ)	6.200	7.550	0.100	13.650
8	Andrea Russo (ITA)	5.400	6.250	0.100	11.550

=== Pommel horse ===
Rank	Athlete	Score			Total
Rank	Athlete	D Score	E Score	Pen.	Total
1st place, gold medalist(s)	Lee Chih-kai (TPE)	6.200	9.200		15.400
2nd place, silver medalist(s)	Nariman Kurbanov (KAZ)	5.900	8.800		14.700
3rd place, bronze medalist(s)	Kazuma Kaya (JPN)	6.600	7.900		14.500
4	Abdulla Azimov (UZB)	5.900	8.450		14.350
5	Lee Jung-hyo (KOR)	5.800	8.375		14.175
6	Michael Tone (AUS)	5.800	8.050		13.850
7	Stefano Patron (ITA)	5.200	8.350		13.550
8	Jacob Bonnay (CAN)	4.400	8.500		12.900

=== Rings ===
Rank	Athlete	Score			Total
Rank	Athlete	D Score	E Score	Pen.	Total
1st place, gold medalist(s)	Artur Avetisyan (ARM)	5.900	9.000		14.900
2nd place, silver medalist(s)	İbrahim Çolak (TUR)	6.200	8.600		14.800
2nd place, silver medalist(s)	Vinzenz Höck (AUT)	6.200	8.600		14.800
4	Wataru Tanigawa (JPN)	6.000	8.650		14.650
5	Ahmet Önder (TUR)	6.000	8.450		14.450
6	Kazuma Kaya (JPN)	6.100	8.350		14.450
7	Alexander Diab (USA)	5.800	8.500		14.300
8	Tang Chia-hung (TPE)	5.500	8.625		14.125

=== Vault ===
Rank	Athlete	Vault	Score				Total
Rank	Athlete	Vault	D Score	E Score	Pen.	Score	Total
1st place, gold medalist(s)	Kim Han-sol (KOR)	1	5.600	9.200		14.800	14.650
1st place, gold medalist(s)	Kim Han-sol (KOR)	2	5.200	9.300		14.500	14.650
2nd place, silver medalist(s)	Yahor Sharamkou (BLR)	1	5.200	9.250		14.450	14.350
2nd place, silver medalist(s)	Yahor Sharamkou (BLR)	2	5.200	9.250	0.100	14.250	14.350
3rd place, bronze medalist(s)	Luís Guilherme Porto (BRA)	1	5.200	9.200		14.400	14.350
3rd place, bronze medalist(s)	Luís Guilherme Porto (BRA)	2	4.800	9.500		14.300	14.350
4	Wataru Tanigawa (JPN)	1	6.000	7.900		14.275	14.275
4	Wataru Tanigawa (JPN)	2	5.600	9.050		14.650	14.275
5	Fabián de Luna (MEX)	1	5.200	9.100		14.300	14.175
5	Fabián de Luna (MEX)	2	5.200	8.950	0.100	14.050	14.175
6	Heath Thorpe (AUS)	1	4.800	9.350		14.150	13.800
6	Heath Thorpe (AUS)	2	4.600	8.950	0.100	13.450	13.800
7	Robert Ghiuzan (ROU)	1	5.200	7.800	0.300	12.700	13.300
7	Robert Ghiuzan (ROU)	2	5.200	9.000	0.3	13.900	13.300
8	Marco Walter (SUI)	1	5.200	9.200		14.400	13.250
8	Marco Walter (SUI)	2	4.800	7.600	0.300	12.100	13.250

=== Parallel bars ===
Rank	Athlete	Score			Total
Rank	Athlete	D Score	E Score	Pen.	Total
1st place, gold medalist(s)	Kakeru Tanigawa (JPN)	6.200	8.650		14.850
2nd place, silver medalist(s)	Ivan Stretovich (RUS)	5.900	8.900		14.800
3rd place, bronze medalist(s)	Ahmet Önder (TUR)	5.700	8.750		14.450
4	Milad Karimi (KAZ)	5.700	8.550		14.250
5	Marco Sarrugerio (ITA)	5.500	8.650		14.150
6	Stefano Patron (ITA)	5.500	8.550		14.050
7	Kazuma Kaya (JPN)	6.300	7.450		13.750
8	Lee Chih-kai (TPE)	5.800	7.900		13.700

=== Horizontal bar ===
Rank	Athlete	Score			Total
Rank	Athlete	D Score	E Score	Pen.	Total
1st place, gold medalist(s)	Tang Chia-hung (TPE)	6.300	8.400		14.700
2nd place, silver medalist(s)	Milad Karimi (KAZ)	6.100	8.575		14.675
3rd place, bronze medalist(s)	Ivan Stretovich (RUS)	6.100	8.500		14.600
4	Ahmet Önder (TUR)	5.700	8.550		14.250
5	Antoine Borello (FRA)	5.900	7.850		13.750
6	Fellipe Ferreira (BRA)	5.500	7.850		13.350
7	Kakeru Tanigawa (JPN)	5.500	7.800		13.300
8	Wataru Tanigawa (JPN)	5.300	7.650		12.950
9	Andrea Russo (ITA)	5.200	7.500		12.700

== Women's Artistic Events ==
=== Team ===
Team	Vault (gymnastics)		Uneven bars		Balance beam		Floor (gymnastics)		Total (All-around)	
Team	Score	Rank	Score	Rank	Score	Rank	Score	Rank	Score	Rank
Japan	28.650	2	27.600	1	25.950	1	26.250	=1	108.450	1st place, gold medalist(s)
Hitomi Hatakeda (JPN)	13.850	5	13.850	1	13.100	1	13.000	4	53.800	1
Aiko Sugihara (JPN)	14.100	4	12.450	14	12.850	5	13.250	2	52.650	4
Asuka Teramoto (JPN)	14.550	2	13.750	2	12.600	7	11.650	17	52.550	5
Russia	28.950	1	27.100	2	25.150	3	26.250	=1	107.450	2nd place, silver medalist(s)
Lilia Akhaimova (RUS)	14.400	3	12.950	9	12.300	11	13.350	1	53.000	2
Tatiana Nabieva (RUS)	14.550	1	13.500	4						
Uliana Perebinosova (RUS)	13.650	8	13.600	3	12.850	2	12.900	5	53.000	3
Italy	26.900	4	26.000	3	25.700	2	24.900	3	103.500	3rd place, bronze medalist(s)
Carlotta Ferlito (ITA)	13.600	10			12.850	3	13.200	3		
Lara Mori (ITA)	13.200	20	12.550	11	12.850	4	11.700	15	50.300	7
Martina Rizzelli (ITA)	13.300	16	13.450	5						
Canada	25.500	7	24.650	4	24.050	4	23.500	=4	97.700	4
Jessica Dowling (CAN)	13.000	22	12.950	8	12.450	8	12.300	7	50.700	6
Alana Fischer (CAN)	11.900	48	8.950	39	9.050	43	9.350	42	39.250	39
Denelle Pedrick (CAN)	12.500	36	11.700	21	11.600	19	11.200	25	47.000	17
Chinese Taipei	27.075	3	22.800	5	22.850	=6	23.500	=4	96.225	5
Chen Feng-Chih (TPE)	12.400	38	11.350	30	11.100	24	11.350	23	46.200	22
Fang Ko-Ching (TPE)	13.575	11	11.450	28	11.750	17	12.150	8	48.925	13
Wu Sing-Fen (TPE)	13.500	12	10.350	35	10.950	27	11.150	27	45.950	24
South Korea	25.850	5	22.750	6	23.350	5	21.700	7	93.650	6
Goo Lae-won (KOR)	12.450	37	8.550	41	11.350	21	10.050	39	42.400	36
Kim Chae-yeon (KOR)	12.500	34	11.200	31	10.500	35	10.950	29	45.150	28
Yang Se-mi (KOR)	13.350	14	11.550	23	12.000	14	10.750	33	47.650	15
Finland	25.750	6	22.450	7	22.850	=6	21.300	6	92.350	7
Maija Leinonen (FIN)	12.900	23	10.500	34	12.050	13	11.500	19	46.950	18
Rosanna Ojala (FIN)	12.850	24	11.950	18	10.800	30	9.800	40	45.400	27
Individual
Felicitas Palmou (ARG)	12.300	39	12.000	17	9.400	41	12.000	11	45.700	26
Romina Pietrantuono (ARG)	12.200	41	11.600	22	11.100	25	11.150	26	46.050	23
Bianca Frysak (AUT)	12.650	27	10.650	33	9.400	42	10.650	34	43.350	30
Marlies Männersdorfer (AUT)	12.600	30	12.200	15	12.400	10	12.000	10	11	49.200
Marina Nekrasova (AZE)	12.650	6			11.850	16				
Mariangeles Murillo (CRC)	12.800	25	11.900	19	10.700	34	11.550	18	46.950	19
Heika Del Sol Salas (CRC)	11.950	47	11.500	27	9.775	40	9.450	41	42.675	34
Ema Kajic (CRO)	12.100	15								
Janine Berger (GER)	13.700	14	13.250	6						
Elizabeth Chan Tsz Sum (HKG)	13.250	11								
Ng Yan Yin (HKG)					12.800	6				
Dalia Al-Salty (HUN)	12.200	41	11.550	24	10.050	38	10.750	32	44.550	29
Armartiani (INA)	12.550	17			9.000	44	10.600	35		
Rifda Irfanaluthfi (INA)	13.200	4			10.900	29	12.050	9		
Aida Bauyrzhanova (KAZ)	12.200	41	9.875	37	11.850	15	11.900	13	45.825	25
Yekaterina Chuikina (KAZ)	11.700	49	8.950	38	10.750	33	11.150	28	42.550	35
Anastasija Dubova (LAT)	12.200	41	8.550	42	11.250	23	10.900	30	42.900	32
Farah Ann Abdul Hadi (MAS)	13.450	13	11.550	25	11.450	20	12.550	6	49.000	12
Tan Ing Yueh (MAS)	13.350	5								
Elze Geurts (NED)	13.850	5	12.450	12	12.050	12	11.900	12	50.250	8
Thea Nygaard (NOR)	12.750	26	11.500	26	10.750	31	11.400	21	46.400	21
Caitlin Todd (NZL)	12.550	16			10.750	32	11.500	20		
Mariana Pitrez (POR)	12.550	31	11.800	20	10.950	28	11.800	14	47.100	16
Andreea Ciurusniuc (ROU)	13.100	21	11.450	29	11.300	22	10.600	36	46.450	20
Patricija Jug (SLO)	12.150	45	8.200	43	10.200	37	10.550	37	41.100	37
Sara King (SLO)	12.300	39	10.250	36	9.950	39	10.400	38	42.900	33
Barbora Mokosova (SVK)	12.650	27	13.000	7	12.400	9	11.200	24	49.250	10
Ekin Morova (TUR)	12.500	34	10.850	32						
Demet Mutlu (TUR)	13.300	16	12.200	15	11.000	26	11.400	22	47.900	14
Yana Fedorova (UKR)	13.650	8	12.800	10	11.650	18	11.650	16	49.750	9
Valeriia Osipova (UKR)			12.450	13						

=== All-around ===
Rank	Athlete	Vault (gymnastics)	Uneven bars	Balance beam	Floor (gymnastics)	Total
1st place, gold medalist(s)	Hitomi Hatakeda (JPN)	14.075	13.800	13.000	13.050	53.925
2nd place, silver medalist(s)	Uliana Perebinosova (RUS)	13.500	14.350	12.100	12.750	52.700
3rd place, bronze medalist(s)	Lilia Akhaimova (RUS)	14.550	13.100	12.750	12.300	52.700
4	Aiko Sugihara (JPN)	14.000	12.650	12.600	13.200	52.450
5	Lara Mori (ITA)	13.250	12.700	12.550	13.200	51.700
6	Yana Fedorova (UKR)	13.500	12.700	12.000	11.850	50.050
7	Denelle Pedrick (CAN)	14.250	11.250	12.000	12.300	49.800
8	Farah Ann Abdul Hadi (MAS)	13.400	12.650	11.250	12.450	49.750
9	Elze Geurts (NED)	13.900	12.050	11.800	11.800	49.550
10	Marlies Männersdorfer (AUT)	12.650	12.450	11.300	12.050	48.450
11	Maija Leinonen (FIN)	13.050	11.950	11.450	11.900	48.350
12	Jessica Dowling (CAN)	13.200	12.150	12.050	10.650	48.050
13	Fang Ko-Ching (TPE)	13.500	11.750	10.900	11.200	47.350
14	Andreea Ciurusniuc (ROU)	13.200	11.150	11.200	11.750	47.300
15	Demet Mutlu (TUR)	12.900	11.200	11.275	11.550	46.925
16	Yang Se-mi (KOR)	13.350	10.400	12.050	11.100	46.900
17	Mariangeles Murillo (CRC)	13.000	11.850	9.550	11.250	45.650
18	Mariana Pitrez (POR)	11.700	11.500	9.700	12.050	44.950

=== Vault ===
Rank	Athlete	Vault	Score				Total
Rank	Athlete	Vault	D Score	E Score	Pen.	Score	Total
1st place, gold medalist(s)	Marina Nekrasova (AZE)	1	5.400	8.700		14.100	14.000
1st place, gold medalist(s)	Marina Nekrasova (AZE)	2	5.200	8.800	0.100	13.900	14.000
2nd place, silver medalist(s)	Lilia Akhaimova (RUS)	1	5.800	8.550		14.350	13.975
2nd place, silver medalist(s)	Lilia Akhaimova (RUS)	2	4.800	8.800		13.600	13.975
3rd place, bronze medalist(s)	Tatiana Nabieva (RUS)	1	5.400	9.100		14.500	13.925
3rd place, bronze medalist(s)	Tatiana Nabieva (RUS)	2	4.800	8.650	0.100	13.350	13.925
4	Yana Fedorova (UKR)	1	4.600	9.100		13.700	13.350
4	Yana Fedorova (UKR)	2	4.000	9.000		13.000	13.350
5	Rifda Irfanaluthfi (INA)	1	4.400	8.700		13.100	13.275
5	Rifda Irfanaluthfi (INA)	2	4.600	8.850		13.450	13.275
6	Elze Geurts (NED)	1	5.000	8.750		13.750	13.200
6	Elze Geurts (NED)	2	4.200	8.450		12.650	13.200
7	Tan Ing Yueh (MAS)	1	4.600	8.500		13.275	13.037
7	Tan Ing Yueh (MAS)	2	4.600	8.500	0.300	12.800	13.037
8	Fang Ko-ching (TPE)	1	4.600	8.650		13.250	13.025
8	Fang Ko-ching (TPE)	2	4.200	8.600		12.800	13.025

=== Uneven bars ===
Rank	Athlete	Score			Total
Rank	Athlete	D Score	E Score	Pen.	Total
1st place, gold medalist(s)	Hitomi Hatakeda (JPN)	5.700	8.300		14.000
2nd place, silver medalist(s)	Tatiana Nabieva (RUS)	5.500	8.400		13.900
3rd place, bronze medalist(s)	Asuka Teramoto (JPN)	5.600	8.200		13.800
4	Janine Berger (GER)	5.600	7.850		13.450
5	Martina Rizzelli (ITA)	5.300	7.900		13.200
6	Jessica Dowling (CAN)	5.600	7.550		13.150
7	Uliana Perebinosova (RUS)	5.700	7.050		12.750
8	Barbora Mokosova (SVK)	5.100	7.000		12.100

=== Balance beam ===
Rank	Athlete	Score			Total
Rank	Athlete	D Score	E Score	Pen.	Total
1st place, gold medalist(s)	Hitomi Hatakeda (JPN)	5.300	7.700		13.000
2nd place, silver medalist(s)	Lara Mori (ITA)	5.600	7.250		12.850
3rd place, bronze medalist(s)	Uliana Perebinosova (RUS)	4.800	8.000		12.800
4	Aiko Sugihara (JPN)	5.600	6.950		12.550
5	Carlotta Ferlito (ITA)	4.800	7.600		12.400
6	Ng Yan Yin (HKG)	5.000	7.100		12.100
7	Jessica Dowling (CAN)	4.900	7.150		12.050
8	Barbora Mokosova (SVK)	4.600	6.950		11.550

=== Floor ===
Rank	Athlete	Score			Total
Rank	Athlete	D Score	E Score	Pen.	Total
1st place, gold medalist(s)	Carlotta Ferlito (ITA)	5.300	7.900		13.200
2nd place, silver medalist(s)	Aiko Sugihara (JPN)	5.300	7.700		13.000
3rd place, bronze medalist(s)	Uliana Perebinosova (RUS)	4.700	8.000		12.700
4	Farah Ann Abdul Hadi (MAS)	4.600	7.950		12.550
5	Hitomi Hatakeda (JPN)	4.700	7.850		12.550
6	Lilia Akhaimova (RUS)	5.500	6.750		12.250
7	Jessica Dowling (CAN)	4.600	7.450	0.100	11.950
8	Barbora Mokosova (SVK)	4.700	7.100		11.800

== Individual Rhythmic Events ==
=== All-around ===
Rank	Athletic	Hoop (rhythmic gymnastics)		Ball (rhythmic gymnastics)		Clubs (rhythmic gymnastics)		Ribbon (rhythmic gymnastics)		Total (All-around)
Rank	Athletic	Score	Rank	Score	Rank	Score	Rank	Score	Rank	Score
1st place, gold medalist(s)	Ekaterina Selezneva (RUS)	21.400	1	21.300	1	21.400	1	19.500	1	83.600
2nd place, silver medalist(s)	Zohra Aghamirova (AZE)	20.200	2	19.350	3	19.850	2	16.025	8	75.425
3rd place, bronze medalist(s)	Laura Zeng (USA)	19.950	3	19.100	4	18.300	7	15.250	14	72.600
4	Yeva Meleshchuk (UKR)	19.600	4	16.400	15	19.750	3	16.650	5	72.400
5	Kim Chae-woon (KOR)	18.150	11	19.700	2	18.800	5	15.500	12	72.150
6	Alessia Russo (ITA)	18.750	6	17.600	11	17.950	10	17.450	3	71.750
7	Salome Pazhava (GEO)	16.800	17	18.950	6	19.300	4	16.050	7	71.100
8	Julia Evchik (BLR)	18.600	8	19.050	5	17.500	12	15.850	10	71.000
9	Fanni Pigniczki (HUN)	18.750	7	17.400	12	18.050	9	16.700	4	70.900
10	Viktoria Bogdanova (EST)	18.050	12	18.800	8	16.850	14	16.000	9	69.700
11	Ruriko Shibayama (JPN)	18.200	10	16.800	14	18.400	6	16.300	6	69.700
12	Sara Llana Garcia (ESP)	18.750	5	17.700	10	18.050	8	15.050	16	69.550
13	Aidana Shakenova (KAZ)	17.600	13	18.950	7	16.600	15	15.150	15	68.300
14	Kseniya Moustafaeva (FRA)	18.450	9	15.100	20	16.900	13	17.450	2	67.900
15	Rebecca Gergalo (FIN)	17.600	14	16.300	17	17.850	11	15.400	13	67.150
16	Brigita Budginas (LTU)	16.950	16	16.350	16	16.150	17	15.550	11	65.000
17	Koi Sie Yan (MAS)	15.000	19	15.350	19	16.500	16	15.000	17	61.850
18	Dildora Rakhmatova (UZB)	17.150	15	18.750	9	12.450	25	13.000	21	61.350
19	Karla Diaz Arnal (MEX)	14.200	23	17.000	13	15.750	18	14.100	19	61.050
20	Xenia Kilianova (SVK)	14.650	20	15.750	18	12.300	27	14.200	18	56.900
21	Aja Jerman Bukavec (SLO)	15.250	18	14.200	21	14.650	20	11.850	23	55.950
22	Karoline Wennberg (NOR)	14.600	21	13.250	25	14.800	19	10.900	30	53.550
23	Alexandra Chtrevenskii (CAN)	14.400	22	12.400	29	12.750	24	13.550	20	53.100
24	Petra Ribaric (CRO)	14.150	24	14.150	22	13.300	23	11.150	25	52.750
25	Elizabeth Inaba-Hill (AUS)	13.600	27	12.850	28	13.750	21	11.500	24	51.700
26	Julia Meder (AUT)	13.900	25	13.100	27	13.600	22	10.950	29	51.550
27	Cassandra Pettersson (SWE)	13.700	26	13.450	24	11.750	29	12.200	22	51.100
28	Beatriz Santos (POR)	12.800	29	14.150	23	12.300	26	10.400	31	49.650
29	Licia Castiglioni (SMR)	12.950	28	13.250	26	11.900	28	11.150	26	49.250
30	Vanina Van Puyvelde (BEL)	11.450	30	11.000	30	10.900	31	11.150	27	44.500
31	Nicoline Sachmann (DEN)	9.550	32	9.900	31	11.450	30	10.950	28	41.850
32	Agustina Belaustegui (ARG)	9.850	31	9.650	32	10.500	32	8.250	32	38.250

=== Hoop ===
Rank	Athlete	Score			Total
Rank	Athlete	D Score	E Score	Pen.	Total
1st place, gold medalist(s)	Ekaterina Selezneva (RUS)	12.300	8.900		21.200
2nd place, silver medalist(s)	Julia Evchik (BLR)	12.200	8.150		20.350
3rd place, bronze medalist(s)	Yeva Meleshchuk (UKR)	12.000	8.150		20.150
4	Laura Zeng (USA)	11.800	8.300		20.100
5	Alessia Russo (ITA)	11.500	7.900		19.400
6	Sara Llana Garcia (ESP)	11.000	7.900		18.900
7	Zohra Aghamirova (AZE)	10.900	7.275		18.175
8	Fanni Pigniczki (HUN)	10.500	7.550		18.050

=== Ball ===
Rank	Athlete	Score			Total
Rank	Athlete	D Score	E Score	Pen.	Total
1st place, gold medalist(s)	Ekaterina Selezneva (RUS)	12.600	8.950		21.550
2nd place, silver medalist(s)	Julia Evchik (BLR)	11.000	8.150		19.150
3rd place, bronze medalist(s)	Viktoria Bogdanova (EST)	11.000	7.850		18.850
4	Laura Zeng (USA)	10.900	7.800		18.700
5	Zohra Aghamirova (AZE)	11.100	6.800		17.900
6	Salome Pazhava (GEO)	10.400	7.250		17.650
7	Aidana Shakenova (KAZ)	10.400	6.900		17.300
8	Kim Chae-woon (KOR)	10.200	6.750	0.300	16.650

=== Clubs ===
Rank	Athlete	Score			Total
Rank	Athlete	D Score	E Score	Pen.	Total
1st place, gold medalist(s)	Yeva Meleshchuk (UKR)	12.600	8.450		21.050
2nd place, silver medalist(s)	Zohra Aghamirova (AZE)	11.900	8.300		20.200
3rd place, bronze medalist(s)	Ekaterina Selezneva (RUS)	11.500	8.500		20.000
4	Laura Zeng (USA)	11.500	7.900		19.400
5	Salome Pazhava (GEO)	10.500	7.700		18.200
6	Sara Llana Garcia (ESP)	9.700	8.000		17.700
7	Kim Chae-woon (KOR)	10.400	7.150		17.550
8	Ruriko Shibayama (JPN)	9.400	7.400		16.800

=== Ribbon ===
Rank	Athlete	Score			Total
Rank	Athlete	D Score	E Score	Pen.	Total
1st place, gold medalist(s)	Ekaterina Selezneva (RUS)	11.700	8.750		20.450
2nd place, silver medalist(s)	Alessia Russo (ITA)	10.500	8.200		18.700
3rd place, bronze medalist(s)	Yeva Meleshchuk (UKR)	10.600	8.100		18.700
4	Salome Pazhava (GEO)	10.300	7.900	0.300	17.900
5	Ruriko Shibayama (JPN)	9.400	8.150		17.550
6	Kseniya Moustafaeva (FRA)	9.600	7.900		17.500
7	Zohra Aghamirova (AZE)	9.600	7.800		17.400
8	Fanni Pigniczki (HUN)	8.800	7.100		15.900

== Group Rhythmic Events ==
=== Squads ===
Team	Australia (AUS)	Japan (JPN)	South Korea (KOR)	Norway (NOR)
Members	Emily Abbot; Alexandra Eedle; Alannah Mathews; Himeka Onoda; Alexandra Teixeira	Miyu Kawata; Misuzu Kishimoto; Mebae Maruyama; Aoi Tsukahara; Haruna Yamawaki	Lee Yeon-jeong; Lim Se-eun; Nam Jin-seul; Song Hye-rin; Yook Hye-min	Emilie Holte; Fanny Lunde; Margit Øverås; Emilie Swensen; Karoline Wennberg
Team	Russia (RUS)	Slovenia (SLO)	Chinese Taipei (TPE)	Ukraine (UKR)
Members	Alina Alieva; Elina Baruzdina; Marina Kozlova; Valeriia Rusina; Angelina Shkatova	Zala Dornig; Zoja Ivančič; Sara Kragulj; Kaja Purič; Tamia Villca Šeme	Chan Ting-chen; Lai Hsin-ya; Lo Yu-ching; Peng Man-ling; Tsai Jui-shan	Olena Diachenko; Viktoriia Fotiieva; Valeriya Khanina; Daria Murai; Anastasiya Voznyak

=== All-around ===
Rank	Team	5		3 & 4		Total (All-around)
Rank	Team	Score	Rank	Score	Rank	Score
1st place, gold medalist(s)	Russia (RUS)	24.200	1	23.050	2	47.250
2nd place, silver medalist(s)	Ukraine (UKR)	21.675	2	24.350	1	46.025
3rd place, bronze medalist(s)	Japan (JPN)	20.750	3	21.450	3	42.200
4	Chinese Taipei (TPE)	20.100	4	19.400	4	39.500
5	South Korea (KOR)	17.950	5	18.575	5	36.525
6	Slovenia (SLO)	17.050	6	18.000	6	35.050
7	Australia (AUS)	15.600	8	16.150	7	31.750
8	Norway (NOR)	15.600	7	14.900	8	30.500

=== 5 balls ===
Rank	Team	Score			Total
Rank	Team	D Score	E Score	Pen.	Total
1st place, gold medalist(s)	Russia (RUS)	16.800	8.275		25.075
2nd place, silver medalist(s)	Ukraine (UKR)	15.300	7.600		22.900
3rd place, bronze medalist(s)	Japan (JPN)	14.600	7.050		21.650
4	Chinese Taipei (TPE)	15.000	6.550		21.550
5	Slovenia (SLO)	12.800	6.300		19.100
6	Australia (AUS)	13.300	5.500		18.800
7	South Korea (KOR)	11.000	5.600		16.600
8	Norway (NOR)	10.700	5.750		16.450

=== 3 hoops + 4 clubs ===
Rank	Team	Score			Total
Rank	Team	D Score	E Score	Pen.	Total
1st place, gold medalist(s)	Russia (RUS)	17.000	8.650		25.650
2nd place, silver medalist(s)	Ukraine (UKR)	16.500	7.950		24.450
3rd place, bronze medalist(s)	Japan (JPN)	13.700	7.450		21.150
4	Chinese Taipei (TPE)	13.900	6.500		20.400
5	Australia (AUS)	13.100	5.700		18.800
6	Slovenia (SLO)	11.900	5.700		17.600
7	Norway (NOR)	10.200	4.900		15.100
8	South Korea (KOR)	11.000	4.000		15.000
