= Archery at the 2019 Summer Universiade – Women's individual recurve =

Women's individual recurve at the XXX Summer Universiade
- Venues: Partenio Stadium, Royal Palace
- Dates: 8–13 July
- Competitors: 56 from 34 nations

Medalists
1st place, gold medalist(s)		Kang Chae-young	South Korea
2nd place, silver medalist(s)		Choi Mi-sun	South Korea
3rd place, bronze medalist(s)		Peng Chia-mao	Chinese Taipei

The women's individual recurve archery competition at the 2019 Summer Universiade was held in the Partenio Stadium, Avellino, Italy and the Royal Palace in Caserta, Italy between July 8 and 13.

== Records ==
Prior to the competition, the world and Universiade records were as follows.

- 72 arrows ranking round

Category	Athlete	Record	Date	Place	Event
World record	(South Korea) Kang Chae-young	692	10 June 2019	's-Hertogenbosch, Netherlands	2019 World Archery Championships
Universiade record	(South Korea) Choi Mi-sun	687	21 August 2017	Taipei, Taiwan	2017 Summer Universiade

== Ranking round ==
Qualified for Round of 32
Qualified for 1/24 Round

The ranking round took place on 9 July 2019 to determine the seeding for the elimination rounds. It consisted of two rounds of 36 arrows, with a maximum score of 720.

Rank	Archer	1st Half	2nd Half	10s	Xs	Score	Notes
1	Kang Chae-young (KOR)	334	342	33	16	676	
2	Choi Mi-sun (KOR)	339	330	38	17	669	
3	Zhang Xinyan (CHN)	325	328	28	15	653	
4	Peng Chia-mao (TPE)	323	328	26	7	651	
5	Alejandra Valencia (MEX)	323	327	22	7	650	
6	Valeria Mylnikova (RUS)	323	318	16	5	641	
7	Svetlana Gomboeva (RUS)	319	317	22	7	636	
8	Diananda Choirunisa (INA)	316	314	17	8	630	
9	Risa Horiguchi (JPN)	320	309	17	6	629	
10	Polina Rodionova (UKR)	310	316	16	5	626	
11	Iryna Khochyna (UKR)	307	319	14	6	626	
12	Amy Jung (USA)	315	310	13	5	625	
13	Chiara Rebagliati (ITA)	303	319	21	4	622	
14	Azusa Yamauchi (JPN)	306	316	17	3	622	
15	Alexandra Longová (SVK)	316	306	10	1	622	
16	Clémence Tellier (FRA)	297	324	18	4	621	
17	Premilaben Shankarbhai Baria (IND)	306	315	17	6	621	
18	Ru Qingning (CHN)	303	317	14	7	620	
19	Wu Sze Yan (HKG)	305	315	13	1	620	
20	Belinda Maxworthy (AUS)	306	314	12	4	620	
21	Magdalena Śmiałkowska (POL)	310	308	15	5	618	
22	Celia Castaños (ESP)	312	306	12	4	618	
23	Sylwia Zyzańska (POL)	305	312	12	6	617	
24	Sakshi Rajendra Shitole (IND)	309	306	10	2	615	
25	Olga Fusek (SUI)	303	308	20	2	611	
26	Yeh Yu-chen (TPE)	296	310	10	2	606	
27	Adriana Martín (ESP)	303	302	13	6	605	
28	Eliana Claps (USA)	299	302	15	5	601	
29	Loren Chloe Balaoing (PHI)	298	302	10	4	600	
30	Iliana Deineko (SUI)	295	300	5	1	595	
31	Shaerra Ezzaty Saffuan (MAS)	298	296	15	6	594	
32	Teja Slana (SLO)	293	301	7	3	594	
33	Alexandra Põllumäe (EST)	305	287	13	4	592	
34	Urška Čavič (SLO)	298	294	7	1	592	
35	Ratna Hamaira Khaerunnisa (INA)	291	299	16	5	590	
36	Anna Polyakova (KAZ)	311	279	14	3	590	
37	Sandra Garza (MEX)	283	306	10	5	589	
38	Keller Chai (SGP)	299	288	12	1	587	
39	Tanya Giada Giaccheri (ITA)	296	290	12	5	586	
40	Zolzaya Munkhbat (MGL)	312	273	9	3	585	
41	Hannah Grace Burnage (GBR)	290	289	7	2	579	
42	Talshyn Kussaiyn (KAZ)	274	302	10	1	576	
43	Klára Grapová (CZE)	283	293	6	2	576	
44	Milena Gatco (MDA)	270	294	11	1	164	
45	Roisin Mooney (IRL)	275	289	9	2	564	
46	Triinu Lilienthal (EST)	280	276	5	4	556	
47	Phillipa Elizabeth Taylor (GBR)	279	274	7	2	553	
48	Nur Aqliah Yusof (MAS)	258	286	6	2	544	
49	Gulnoza Makhamadjonova (UZB)	269	270	6	4	539	
50	Ilse Houbiers (NED)	278	261	4	1	539	
51	Giulia Tilio (SMR)	249	255	5	1	504	
52	Shanaya Rose Dangla (PHI)	254	241	1	1	495	
53	Enkhzul Enkhbayar (MGL)	245	239	6	2	484	
54	Cheryl Loorents (SWE)	233	248	4	0	481	
55	Gulmirakhon Urinboeva (UZB)	231	222	2	1	453	
56	Fatima Al Dabbagh (KSA)	49	61	1	0	110	

== Elimination round ==
=== Section 1 ===
1/24 Round
33	Alexandra Põllumäe (EST)	24	21	24
32	Teja Slana (SLO)	26	26	26
17	Premilaben Shankarbhai Baria (IND)	26	25	23	27	25
48	Nur Aqilah Yusof (MAS)	27	24	27	24	22
49	Gulnoza Makhamadjonova (UZB)	23	18	16
16	Clémence Tellier (FRA)	27	23	28

Round of 32
1	Kang Chae-young (KOR)	29	29	28	25
32	Teja Slana (SLO)	27	23	29	20
17	Premilaben Shankarbhai Baria (IND)	27	21	28	19	24
16	Clémence Tellier (FRA)	25	23	25	21	21

Round of 16
1	Kang Chae-young (KOR)	26	26	28	30	26
17	Premilaben Shankarbhai (IND)	28	23	28	27	24

=== Section 2 ===
1/24 Round
9	Risa Horiguchi (JPN)	24	26	29
56	Fatima Al Dabbagh (KSA)	9	14	9
41	Hannah Grace Burnage (GBR)	27	26	27
24	Sakshi Rajendra Shitole (IND)	25	24	25
25	Olga Fusek (SUI)	21	25	25	24	28
40	Zolzaya Munkhbat (MGL)	22	21	21	24	24

Round of 32
9	Risa Horiguchi (JPN)	25	25	28	26	29
41	Hannah Grace Burnage (GBR)	26	25	24	22	25
25	Olga Fusek (SUI)	28	26	26	28
8	Diananda Choirunisa (INA)	26	24	26	25

Round of 16
9	Risa Horiguchi (JPN)	26	20	23	26
25	Olga Fusek (SUI)	23	24	22	18

=== Section 3 ===
1/24 Round
37	Sandra Garza (MEX)	24	26	25	26	26
28	Eliana Claps (USA)	25	23	25	28	26
21	Magdalena Śmiałkowska (POL)	25	26	25	29
44	Milena Gatco (MDA)	21	24	27	21
53	Enkhzul Enkhbayar (MGL)	27	25	26
12	Amy Jung (USA)	28	28	27

Round of 32
5	Alejandra Valencia (MEX)	29	27	28	27
28	Eliana Claps (USA)	29	25	25	27
21	Magdalena Śmiałkowska (POL)	25	28	25	24
12	Amy Jung (USA)	29	25	27	27

Round of 16
5	Alejandra Valencia (MEX)	25	29	29	26
12	Amy Jung (USA)	27	24	27	24

=== Section 4 ===
1/24 Round
13	Chiara Rebagliati (ITA)	27	24	19	24	24
52	Shanaya Rose Dangla (PHI)	17	24	27	22	16
45	Roisin Mooney (IRL)	25	19	25
20	Belinda Maxworthy (AUS)	28	26	26
29	Loren Chloe Balaoing (PHI)	22	26	25
36	Anna Polyakova (KAZ)	27	27	26

Round of 32
13	Chiara Rebagliati (ITA)	25	23	25	25
20	Belinda Maxworthy (AUS)	26	25	24	26
36	Anna Polyakova (KAZ)	24	13	26	19
4	Peng Chia-mao (TPE)	30	26	26	25

Round of 16
20	Belinda Maxworthy (AUS)	24	27	24	24
4	Peng Chia-mao (TPE)	24	27	29	27

=== Section 5 ===
1/24 Round
35	Ratna Humaira Khaerunnisa (INA)	26	27	24	23	25
30	Iliana Deineko (SUI)	23	28	18	26	27
19	Wu Sze Yan (HKG)	26	26	25	24	25
46	Triinu Lilienthal (EST)	24	25	25	25	25
51	Giulia Tilio (SMR)	18	21	22
14	Azusa Yamauchi (JPN)	28	28	30

Round of 32
3	Zhang Xinyan (CHN)	27	27	26
30	Iliana Deineko (SUI)	25	22	23
19	Wu Sze Yan (HKG)	27	28	21	27	25
14	Azusa Yamauchi (JPN)	27	24	26	27	27

Round of 16
3	Zhang Xinyan (CHN)	25	22	30	27	26
14	Azusa Yamauchi (JPN)	27	26	27	27	26

=== Section 6 ===
1/24 Round
11	Iryna Khochyna (UKR)	19	24	25
54	Cheryl Loorents (SWE)	18	23	24
43	Klára Grapová (CZE)	17	21	22
20	Celia Castaños (ESP)	29	26	23
27	Adriana Martín (ESP)	25	26	24	26
38	Keller Chai (SGP)	24	23	27	22

Round of 32
11	Iryna Khochyna (UKR)	27	27	24	27	26
20	Celia Castaños (ESP)	30	25	29	23	23
27	Adriana Martín (ESP)	24	21	21
6	Valeria Mylinikova (RUS)	25	26	26

Round of 16
11	Iryna Khochyna (UKR)	23	25	26
6	Valeria Mylinikova (RUS)	26	28	28

=== Section 7 ===
1/24 Round
39	Tanya Giada Giaccheri (ITA)	27	29	26	20
26	Yeh Yu-chen (TPE)	25	30	29	27
23	Sylwia Zyzańska (POL)	25	25	25
42	Talshyn Kussaiyn (KAZ)	23	24	21
55	Gulmirakhon Urinboeva (UZB)	22	27	21	18
10	Polina Rodionova (UKR)	289	27	27	28

Round of 32
7	Svetlana Gomboeva (RUS)	26	26	26	23
26	Yeh Yu-chen (TPE)	28	25	29	24
23	Sylwia Zyzańska (POL)	24	24	27	30
10	Polina Rodionova (UKR)	25	23	26	24

Round of 16
26	Yeh Yu-chen (TPE)	24	21	28	19
23	Sylwia Zyzańska (POL)	25	24	27	25

=== Section 8 ===
1/24 Round
15	Alexandra Longová (SVK)	25	27	23	24
50	Ilse Houbiers (NED)	25	26	18	21
47	Phillipa Elizabeth Taylor (GBR)	22	25	24	22	21
18	Ru Qingning (CHN)	19	20	25	28	25
31	Shaerra Ezzaty Saffuan (ESP)	25	22	25	23
34	Urška Čavič (SLO)	28	25	23	24

Round of 32
15	Alexandra Longová (SVK)	23	26	18
18	Ru Qingning (CHN)	28	28	23
34	Urška Čavič (SLO)	27	24	26	13
2	Choi Mi-sun (KOR)	27	26	26	27

Round of 16
18	Ru Qingning (SLO)	29	22	26	24
2	Choi Mi-sun (KOR)	25	27	27	28

=== Final Rounds ===
Quarterfinals
1	Kang Chae-young (KOR)	28	39	29	28
9	Risa Horiguchi (JPN)	24	24	29	28
5	Alejandra Valencia (MEX)	30	26	28	27	24
4	Peng Chia-mao (TPE)	28	29	28	30	25
14	Azusa Yamauchi (JPN)	24	26	23
6	Valeria Mylnikova (RUS)	27	28	26
23	Sylwia Zyzańska (POL)	27	27	25	29	22
2	Choi Mi-sun (KOR)	26	27	26	29	26

Semifinals
1	Kang Chae-young (KOR)	29	30	27	28
4	Peng Chia-mao (TPE)	27	25	28	24
6	Valeria Mylnikova (RUS)	21	25	28
2	Choi Mi-sun (KOR)	27	29	29

Final
1	Kang Chae-young (KOR)	29	27	26	27	28	W
2	Choi Mi-sun (KOR)	27	27	28	28	26	L
Bronze Medal
4	Peng Chia-mao (TPE)	28	24	30	29
6	Valeria Mylnikova (RUS)	26	29	27	26
