= Archery at the 2019 Summer Universiade – Mixed team compound =

Mixed team compound at the XXX Summer Universiade
- Venues: Partenio Stadium, Royal Palace
- Dates: July 8, 2019 – July 13, 2019
- Competitors: 42 from 21 nations

Medalists
1st place, gold medalist(s)		Lisell Jäätma; Robin Jäätma	Estonia
2nd place, silver medalist(s)		Yi-Hsuan Chen; Chieh-Lun Chen	Chinese Taipei
3rd place, bronze medalist(s)		So Chae-won; Kim Jong-ho	South Korea

The mixed team compound archery competition at the 2019 Summer Universiade was held in the Partenio Stadium, Avellino, Italy and the Royal Palace in Caserta, Italy between July 8 and 13.

== Qualification round ==
Rank	Team	Archer	Individual	Team	Notes
Rank	Team	Archer	Score	Total	Notes
1	South Korea	Chaewon So	695	1411	GR
1	South Korea	Jongho Kim	716	1411	GR
2	Turkey	Yesim Bostan	701	1405	
2	Turkey	Suleyman Araz	704	1405	
3	South Africa	Danelle Wentzel	701	1402	
3	South Africa	Christian Beyers de Klerk	701	1402	
4	Mexico	Andrea Maya Becerra Arizaga	693	1400	
4	Mexico	Rodolfo Gonzalez de Alba	707	1400	
5	Chinese Taipei	Yi-Hsuan Chen	690	1391	
5	Chinese Taipei	Chieh-Lun Chen	701	1391	
6	Great Britain	Sarah Elizabeth Moon	692	1390	
6	Great Britain	Kai Leon Thomas-Prause	698	1390	
7	Iran	Sogand Haddad	678	1384	
7	Iran	Mohammadsaleh Palizban	706	1384	
8	Russia	Alexandra Savenkova	683	1378	
8	Russia	Anton Bulaev	695	1378	
9	India	Prabhjot Kaur	678	1377	
9	India	Rajat Chauhan	699	1377	
10	Estonia	Lisell Jäätma	680	1376	
10	Estonia	Robin Jäätma	696	1376	
11	France	Lola Grandjean	678	1373	
11	France	Camille Dufour	695	1373	
12	United States	Dahila Haline Klimtchek	672	1371	
12	United States	Josh Barry Isenhoff	699	1371	
13	Italy	Eleonara Grilli	672	1369	
13	Italy	Alex Boggiatto	697	1369	
14	Kazakhstan	Viktoriya Lyan	685	1365	
14	Kazakhstan	Vladimir Sorokin	680	1365	
15	Indonesia	Ratih Zilizati Fadhly	669	1364	
15	Indonesia	Yoke Rizaldi Akbar	695	1364	
16	Singapore	Tze Chieh Contessa Loh	673	1356	
16	Singapore	Jun Hui Goh	683	1356	
17	Ukraine	Oleksandra Hrabik	671	1353	
17	Ukraine	Oleg Piven	682	1353	
18	Malaysia	Nur Aina Tasmine Halim	667	1350	
18	Malaysia	Muhammad Fahur Rosi Choiril Anuar	683	1350	
19	Australia	Niamh Jones	646	1343	
19	Australia	Remy Leonard	697	1343	
20	Ireland	Niamh Merry	660	1337	
20	Ireland	Daniel Foley	677	1337	
21	Japan	Ayaka Nedachi	654	1335	
21	Japan	Ryosuke Kishi	681	1335	

== Elimination rounds ==
1/12 Round
17	Ukraine	149
16	Singapore	146
21	Japan	150
12	United States	155
13	Italy	154
20	Ireland	152
19	Australia	151 T.19
14	Kazakhstan	151 T.19*
15	Indonesia	149 T.18*
18	Malaysia	149 T.18

Round of 16
1	South Korea	159 GR
17	Ukraine	147
9	India	154
8	Russia	152
5	Chinese Taipei	156
12	United States	153
13	Italy	150
4	Mexico	154
3	South Africa	152
14	Kazakhstan	153
11	France	152
6	Great Britain	153
7	Iran	151
10	Estonia	156
18	Indonesia	154
2	Turkey	155

Quarterfinals
1	South Korea	157
9	India	146
5	Chinese Taipei	156
4	Mexico	155
14	Kazakhstan	152
6	Great Britain	149
15	Indonesia	154
2	Turkey	155

Semifinals
1	South Korea	156 T.20
5	Chinese Taipei	156 T.20*
14	Kazakhstan	148
10	Estonia	152

Final
5	Chinese Taipei	155 T.18
10	Estonia	155 T.20
Third place
1	South Korea	149
14	Kazakhstan	140
