= Taekwondo at the 2019 Summer Universiade =

Taekwondo at the XXX Summer Universiade
- Venue: Palazzetto Sport Casoria
- Dates: 7–13 July

Taekwondo was contested at the 2019 Summer Universiade from 7 to 13 July 2019 at the Palazzetto Sport Casoria in Naples.

== Medal summary ==
=== Medal table ===
| Rank | Nation | Gold | Silver | Bronze | Total |
|---|---|---|---|---|---|
| 1 | South Korea | 7 | 3 | 2 | 12 |
| 2 | Iran | 5 | 0 | 6 | 11 |
| 3 | Chinese Taipei | 2 | 6 | 3 | 11 |
| 4 | Turkey | 2 | 0 | 0 | 2 |
| 5 | United States | 1 | 1 | 1 | 3 |
| 6 | France | 1 | 0 | 2 | 3 |
| 6 | Thailand | 1 | 0 | 2 | 3 |
| 8 | Egypt | 0 | 2 | 0 | 2 |
| 9 | China | 0 | 1 | 1 | 2 |
| 9 | Russia | 0 | 1 | 1 | 2 |
| 11 | Belgium | 0 | 1 | 0 | 1 |
| 11 | Kazakhstan | 0 | 1 | 0 | 1 |
| 11 | Mongolia | 0 | 1 | 0 | 1 |
| 11 | Norway | 0 | 1 | 0 | 1 |
| 11 | Uzbekistan | 0 | 1 | 0 | 1 |
| 16 | Mexico | 0 | 0 | 3 | 3 |
| 17 | Poland | 0 | 0 | 2 | 2 |
| 17 | Ukraine | 0 | 0 | 2 | 2 |
| 19 | Armenia | 0 | 0 | 1 | 1 |
| 19 | Azerbaijan | 0 | 0 | 1 | 1 |
| 19 | Brazil | 0 | 0 | 1 | 1 |
| 19 | Chile | 0 | 0 | 1 | 1 |
| 19 | Croatia | 0 | 0 | 1 | 1 |
| 19 | Cyprus | 0 | 0 | 1 | 1 |
| 19 | Indonesia | 0 | 0 | 1 | 1 |
| 19 | Italy* | 0 | 0 | 1 | 1 |
| 19 | Latvia | 0 | 0 | 1 | 1 |
| 19 | Malaysia | 0 | 0 | 1 | 1 |
| 19 | Moldova | 0 | 0 | 1 | 1 |
| 19 | Morocco | 0 | 0 | 1 | 1 |
| 19 | Portugal | 0 | 0 | 1 | 1 |
| Totals (31 entries) | | 19 | 19 | 38 | 76 |

=== Men's events ===
| Event | Gold | Silver | Bronze |
|---|---|---|---|
| –58 kg (flyweight) | Armin Hadipour; Iran | Molomyn Tümenbayar; Mongolia | Ramnarong Sawekwiharee; Thailand |
| –58 kg (flyweight) | Armin Hadipour; Iran | Molomyn Tümenbayar; Mongolia | Antonio Flecca; Italy |
| –63 kg (bantamweight) | Soroush Ahmadi; Iran | Niyaz Pulatov; Uzbekistan | Wu Yichao; China |
| –63 kg (bantamweight) | Soroush Ahmadi; Iran | Niyaz Pulatov; Uzbekistan | Dylan Chellamootoo; France |
| –68 kg (featherweight) | Mirhashem Hosseini; Iran | Si Mohamed Ketbi; Belgium | Kim Kyung-deok; South Korea |
| –68 kg (featherweight) | Mirhashem Hosseini; Iran | Si Mohamed Ketbi; Belgium | Sergey Vardazaryan; Armenia |
| –74 kg (lightweight) | Amir Mohammad Bakhshi; Iran | Victor Asp; Norway | Soufiane Elasbi; Morocco |
| –74 kg (lightweight) | Amir Mohammad Bakhshi; Iran | Victor Asp; Norway | Júlio Ferreira; Portugal |
| –80 kg (welterweight) | Kang Min-woo; South Korea | Seif Eissa; Egypt | Liu Wei-ting; Chinese Taipei |
| –80 kg (welterweight) | Kang Min-woo; South Korea | Seif Eissa; Egypt | Denys Voronovskyi; Ukraine |
| –87 kg (middleweight) | Park In-ho; South Korea | Smaiyl Duisebay; Kazakhstan | Andrés Beceiro; Mexico |
| –87 kg (middleweight) | Park In-ho; South Korea | Smaiyl Duisebay; Kazakhstan | Rafael Kamalov; Russia |
| Individual Poomsae | Kang Wan-jin; South Korea | Edward Jeong; United States | Leonardo Juárez; Mexico |
| Individual Poomsae | Kang Wan-jin; South Korea | Edward Jeong; United States | Kourosh Bakhtiar; Iran |
| Team Poomsae | South Korea (KOR); Kang Wan-jin; Oh Chang-hyun; Park Kwang-ho | Chinese Taipei (TPE); Chen Po-kai; Huang Sheng-peng; Li Cheng-gan | Iran (IRI); Kourosh Bakhtiar; Amir Reza Mehraban; Ali Sohrabi |
| Team Poomsae | South Korea (KOR); Kang Wan-jin; Oh Chang-hyun; Park Kwang-ho | Chinese Taipei (TPE); Chen Po-kai; Huang Sheng-peng; Li Cheng-gan | Indonesia (INA); Abdul Rahman Darwin; I Kadek Dwipayana; Muhammad Abdurrahman Wahyu |
| Team Kyorugi | Iran (IRI); Soroush Ahmadi; Amir Mohammad Bakhshi; Mirhashem Hosseini; Erfan Nazemi | Egypt (EGY); Abdelrahman Wael; Mohamed Ahmed; Omar Ghonim; Salaheldin Khairy | Chinese Taipei (TPE); Ho Chia-hsin; Hou Kuang-wu; Lee Meng-en; Liu Wei-ting |
| Team Kyorugi | Iran (IRI); Soroush Ahmadi; Amir Mohammad Bakhshi; Mirhashem Hosseini; Erfan Nazemi | Egypt (EGY); Abdelrahman Wael; Mohamed Ahmed; Omar Ghonim; Salaheldin Khairy | Malaysia (MAS); Ahmad Nor Iman Hakim Rakib; Hamdanwahid Rinaldi; Muhammed Syafiq Zuber; Rozali Rozaimi |

=== Women's events ===
| Event | Gold | Silver | Bronze |
|---|---|---|---|
| –49 kg (flyweight) | Panipak Wongpattanakit; Thailand | Jhuang Tien-yu; Chinese Taipei | Iryna Romoldanova; Ukraine |
| –49 kg (flyweight) | Panipak Wongpattanakit; Thailand | Jhuang Tien-yu; Chinese Taipei | Kyriaki Kouttouki; Cyprus |
| –53 kg (bantamweight) | Su Po-ya; Chinese Taipei | Ha Min-ah; South Korea | Inese Tarvida; Latvia |
| –53 kg (bantamweight) | Su Po-ya; Chinese Taipei | Ha Min-ah; South Korea | Patimat Abakarova; Azerbaijan |
| –57 kg (featherweight) | Kim Yu-jin; South Korea | Chen Yu-chuang; Chinese Taipei | Patrycja Adamkiewicz; Poland |
| –57 kg (featherweight) | Kim Yu-jin; South Korea | Chen Yu-chuang; Chinese Taipei | Fernanda Aguirre; Chile |
| –62 kg (lightweight) | İrem Yaman; Turkey | Yulia Turutina; Russia | Bárbara Novaes; Brazil |
| –62 kg (lightweight) | İrem Yaman; Turkey | Yulia Turutina; Russia | Bruna Vuletić; Croatia |
| –67 kg (welterweight) | Magda Wiet-Henin; France | Shan Yunyun; China | Chuang Kuan-yu; Chinese Taipei |
| –67 kg (welterweight) | Magda Wiet-Henin; France | Shan Yunyun; China | Ana Ciuchitu; Moldova |
| –73 kg (middleweight) | Nafia Kuş; Turkey | Yoon Do-hee; South Korea | Marie-Paule Blé; France |
| –73 kg (middleweight) | Nafia Kuş; Turkey | Yoon Do-hee; South Korea | Melika Mirhosseini; Iran |
| Individual Poomsae | Adalis Munoz; United States | Su Chia-en; Chinese Taipei | Yun Ji-hye; South Korea |
| Individual Poomsae | Adalis Munoz; United States | Su Chia-en; Chinese Taipei | Fatemeh Hesam; Iran |
| Team Poomsae | South Korea (KOR); Hwang Ye-bin; Jeong Seung-yeon; Yun Ji-hye | Chinese Taipei (TPE); Chen Yi-hsuan; Li Chieh-yu; Su Chia-en | Thailand (THA); Sakuna Laosungnoen; Phenkanya Phaisankiattikun; Ornawee Srisahakit |
| Team Poomsae | South Korea (KOR); Hwang Ye-bin; Jeong Seung-yeon; Yun Ji-hye | Chinese Taipei (TPE); Chen Yi-hsuan; Li Chieh-yu; Su Chia-en | Iran (IRI); Fatemeh Hesam; Marjan Salahshouri; Marjan Taji |
| Team Kyorugi | Chinese Taipei (TPE); Su Po-ya; Chen Yu-chuang; Chuang Kuan-yu; Ma Ting-hsia | South Korea (KOR); Ha Min-ah; Jo Heekyeong; Kim Yu-jin; Yoon Do-hee | United States (USA); Makayla Christine Gorka; Cheyenne Marie Lewis; Liyette Salas; Logan Avery Weber |
| Team Kyorugi | Chinese Taipei (TPE); Su Po-ya; Chen Yu-chuang; Chuang Kuan-yu; Ma Ting-hsia | South Korea (KOR); Ha Min-ah; Jo Heekyeong; Kim Yu-jin; Yoon Do-hee | Poland (POL); Patrycja Adamkiewicz; Gabriela Dajnowicz; Magdalena Leporowska; Karolina Ziejewska |

=== Mixed events ===
| Event | Gold | Silver | Bronze |
|---|---|---|---|
| Team Poomsae | South Korea (KOR); Oh Chang-hyun; Hwang Ye-bin | Chinese Taipei (TPE); Chen Po-kai; Li Chieh-yu | Mexico (MEX); Leonardo Juárez; Ana Ibáñez |
| Team Poomsae | South Korea (KOR); Oh Chang-hyun; Hwang Ye-bin | Chinese Taipei (TPE); Chen Po-kai; Li Chieh-yu | Iran (IRI); Amir Reza Mehraban; Marjan Salahshouri |
