= Brazil at the 2019 Summer Universiade =

- Flag of Brazil
- IOC code: BRA

in Naples, Italy 3 July 2019 – 14 July 2019
- Medals Ranked 13th: Gold 5 Silver 3 Bronze 9 Total 17

Summer Universiade appearances (overview)
- 1959; 1961; 1963; 1965; 1967; 1970; 1973; 1975; 1977; 1979; 1981; 1983; 1985; 1987; 1989; 1991; 1993; 1995; 1997; 1999; 2001; 2003; 2005; 2007; 2009; 2011; 2013; 2015; 2017; 2019; 2021; 2025; 2027

Brazil competed at the 2019 Summer Universiade in Naples, Italy held from 3 to 14 July 2019.

== Medal summary ==
=== Medal by sports ===
Medals by sport
Athletics	4	1	2	7
Football	0	1	0	1
Gymnastics	0	0	1	1
Judo	0	0	3	3
Swimming	1	1	2	4
Taekwondo	0	0	1	1

=== Medalists ===
Medal	Name	Sport	Event	Date
Gold	Paulo André de Oliveira	Athletics	Men's 100 metres	July 9
Gold	Paulo André de Oliveira	Athletics	Men's 200 metres	July 11
Gold	Alison Santos	Athletics	Men's 400 metres hurdles	July 11
Gold	Gabriel Constantino	Athletics	Men's 110 metres hurdles	July 12
Gold	Jhennifer Alves	Swimming	Women's 50 metre breaststroke	July 10
Silver	Mateus de Sá	Athletics	Men's triple jump	July 10
Silver	Men's team	Football	Men's tournament	July 13
Silver	Luiz Gustavo Borges; Marco Antônio Ferreira; Gabriel Ogawa; Felipe de Souza	Swimming	Men's 4 × 100 metre freestyle relay	July 4
Bronze	Luís Guilherme Porto	Gymnastics	Men's vault	July 7
Bronze	Rodrigo do Nascimento	Athletics	Men's 100 metres	July 9
Bronze	Alexsandro Melo	Athletics	Men's triple jump	July 10
Bronze	Sibilla Faccholli	Judo	Women's open weight	July 6
Bronze	Willian Lima	Judo	Men's featherweight	July 6
Bronze	Gustavo Assis	Judo	Men's middleweight	July 4
Bronze	Marco Antônio Ferreira	Swimming	Men's 100 metre freestyle	July 8
Bronze	Gabriel Fantoni; Pedro Cardona; Iago Moussalem; Marco Antônio Ferreira; Guilherme Basseto; Felipe de Souza	Swimming	Men's 4 × 100 metre medley relay	July 10
Bronze	Bárbara Novaes	Taekwondo	Women's 62 kg	July 11
