= Judo at the 2019 Summer Universiade =

Judo competition

Judo Judo at the 2019 Summer Universiade
- Venue: Mostra d'Oltremare
- Location: Naples, Italy
- Dates: 4–7 July 2019
- Competitors: 367 from 55 nations

Medalists
gold medal	Japan (8th title)
silver medal	Russia
bronze medal	South Korea

Champions
- Men's team: Russia (2nd title)
- Women's team: Japan (7th title)

Competition at external databases
- Links: IJF • EJU • JudoInside

Judo was contested at the 2019 Summer Universiade at the Mostra d'Oltremare Pav. 6 in Naples, Italy from 4 to 7 July 2019.

== Medal summary ==
=== Medal table ===
Rank	Nation	Gold	Silver	Bronze	Total
1	Japan	7	3	1	11
2	Russia	3	2	5	10
3	South Korea	1	4	3	8
4	Moldova	1	0	1	2
5	Austria	1	0	0	1
5	Kazakhstan	1	0	0	1
7	France	0	2	0	2
8	Azerbaijan	0	1	1	2
8	Georgia	0	1	1	2
8	Netherlands	0	1	1	2
11	Uzbekistan	0	0	4	4
12	Brazil	0	0	3	3
13	Germany	0	0	2	2
13	Turkey	0	0	2	2
15	Hungary	0	0	1	1
15	Mongolia	0	0	1	1
15	North Korea	0	0	1	1
15	Ukraine	0	0	1	1
Totals (18 entries)		14	14	28	56

=== Men's events ===
Event	Gold	Silver	Bronze
Featherweight –66 kg	Denis Vieru; Moldova	Ranto Katsura; Japan	Willian Lima; Brazil
Featherweight –66 kg	Denis Vieru; Moldova	Ranto Katsura; Japan	Ismail Chasygov; Russia
Lightweight –73 kg	Evgenii Prokopchuk; Russia	Hidayat Heydarov; Azerbaijan	Kim Chol-gwang; North Korea
Lightweight –73 kg	Evgenii Prokopchuk; Russia	Hidayat Heydarov; Azerbaijan	Khikmatillokh Turaev; Uzbekistan
Welterweight –81 kg	Hikaru Tomokiyo; Japan	Lee Moon-jin; South Korea	Dorin Gotonoaga; Moldova
Welterweight –81 kg	Hikaru Tomokiyo; Japan	Lee Moon-jin; South Korea	Tato Grigalashvili; Georgia
Middleweight –90 kg	Johannes Pacher; Austria	Lasha Bekauri; Georgia	Gustavo Assis; Brazil
Middleweight –90 kg	Johannes Pacher; Austria	Lasha Bekauri; Georgia	Krisztián Tóth; Hungary
Light heavyweight +90 kg	Ruslan Shakhbazov; Russia	Kanta Nakano; Japan	Kim Min-jong; South Korea
Light heavyweight +90 kg	Ruslan Shakhbazov; Russia	Kanta Nakano; Japan	Mukhammadkarim Khurramov; Uzbekistan
Open weight	Galymzhan Krikbay; Kazakhstan	Hadrian Livolsi; France	Jur Spijkers; Netherlands
Open weight	Galymzhan Krikbay; Kazakhstan	Hadrian Livolsi; France	Davlat Bobonov; Uzbekistan
Team	Russia (RUS); Abas Azizov; Ismail Chasygov; Roman Dontsov; Evgeny Prokopchuk; Ruslan Shakhbazov	South Korea (KOR); Kang Heon-cheol; Kim Min-jong; Kim Tae-ho; Lee Moon-jin; Shin Ho	Azerbaijan (AZE); Ibrahim Aliyev; Murad Fatiyev; Hidayat Heydarov; Rustam Kotsoiev; Aliumar Tumaev
Team	Russia (RUS); Abas Azizov; Ismail Chasygov; Roman Dontsov; Evgeny Prokopchuk; Ruslan Shakhbazov	South Korea (KOR); Kang Heon-cheol; Kim Min-jong; Kim Tae-ho; Lee Moon-jin; Shin Ho	Japan (JPN); Hideyuki Ishigooka; Ranto Katsura; Kanta Nakano; Goki Tajima; Hikaru Tomokiyo

=== Women's events ===
Event	Gold	Silver	Bronze
Featherweight –52 kg	Ryūko Takeda; Japan	Park Da-sol; South Korea	Diyora Keldiyorova; Uzbekistan
Featherweight –52 kg	Ryūko Takeda; Japan	Park Da-sol; South Korea	Daria Bobrikova; Russia
Lightweight –57 kg	Kana Tomizawa; Japan	Gaëtane Deberdt; France	Natalia Golomidova; Russia
Lightweight –57 kg	Kana Tomizawa; Japan	Gaëtane Deberdt; France	Kim Ji-su; South Korea
Welterweight –63 kg	Nana Kota; Japan	Geke van den Berg; Netherlands	Kamila Badurova; Russia
Welterweight –63 kg	Nana Kota; Japan	Geke van den Berg; Netherlands	Bayarbatyn Baasanjargal; Mongolia
Middleweight –70 kg	Shiho Tanaka; Japan	Madina Taimazova; Russia	Hanna Antykalo; Ukraine
Middleweight –70 kg	Shiho Tanaka; Japan	Madina Taimazova; Russia	Sarah Makelburg; Germany
Light heavyweight +70 kg	Han Mi-jin; South Korea	Maya Akiba; Japan	Anna Gushchina; Russia
Light heavyweight +70 kg	Han Mi-jin; South Korea	Maya Akiba; Japan	Sebile Akbulut; Turkey
Open weight	Maya Akiba; Japan	Han Mi-jin; South Korea	Sebile Akbulut; Turkey
Open weight	Maya Akiba; Japan	Han Mi-jin; South Korea	Sibilla Faccholli; Brazil
Team	Japan (JPN); Maya Akiba; Nana Kota; Ryūko Takeda; Shiho Tanaka; Kana Tomizawa	Russia (RUS); Kamila Badurova; Daria Bobrikova; Natalia Golomidova; Anna Gushchina; Madina Taimazova	Germany (GER); Renée Lucht; Sarah Mäkelburg; Lara Reimann; Pauline Starke; Annika Würfel
Team	Japan (JPN); Maya Akiba; Nana Kota; Ryūko Takeda; Shiho Tanaka; Kana Tomizawa	Russia (RUS); Kamila Badurova; Daria Bobrikova; Natalia Golomidova; Anna Gushchina; Madina Taimazova	South Korea (KOR); Han Hee-ju; Han Mi-jin; Kim Ji-su; Lee Ye-won; Park Da-sol
