= Mariola Bodnarchuk =

Ukrainian rhythmic gymnast (born 2002)

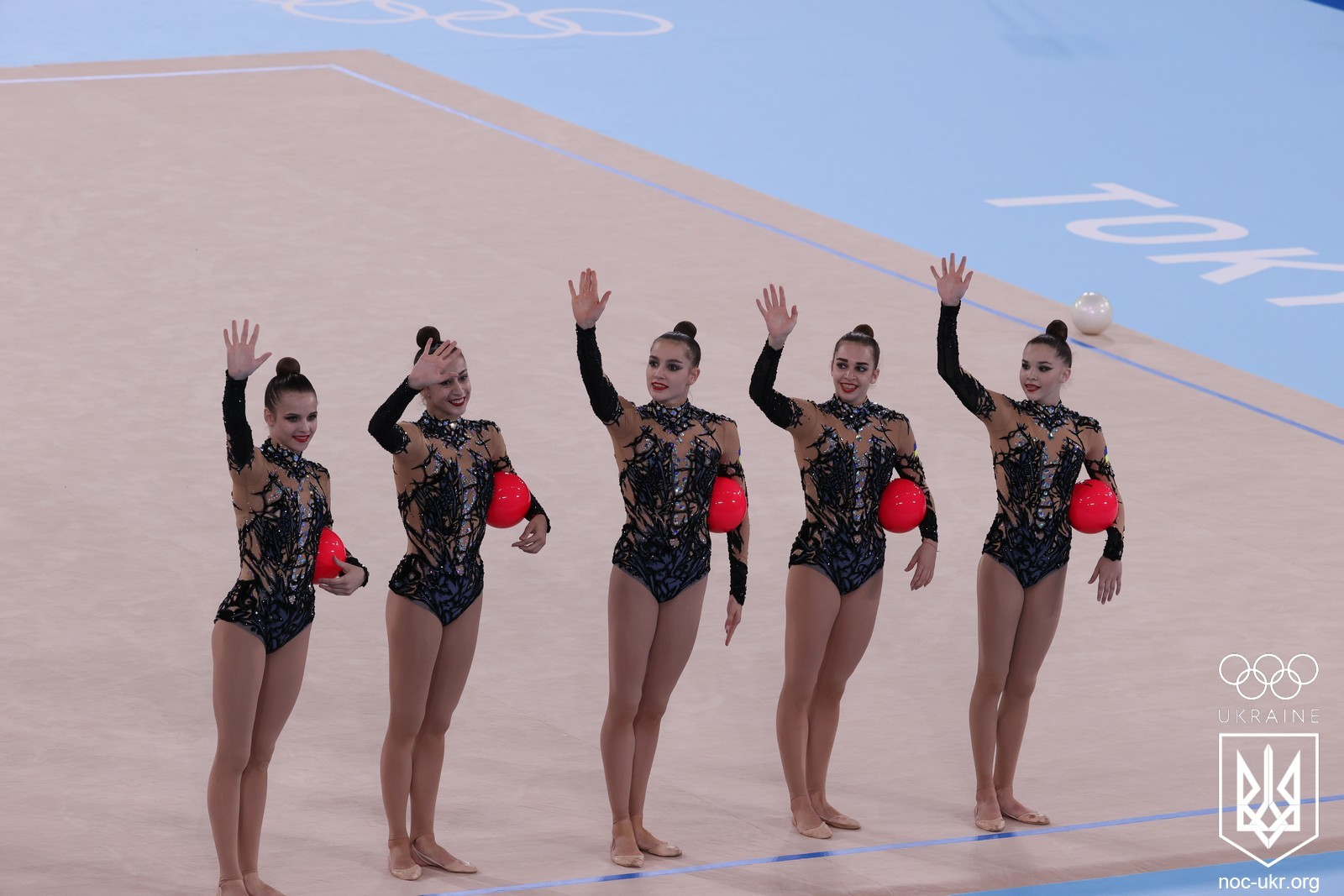
- Bodnarchuk (centre) with her teammates at the 2020 Summer Olympics

Personal information
- Full name: Mariola Pavlivna Bodnarchuk
- Born: 23 March 2002 (age 24) Lviv, Ukraine
- Height: 165 cm (5 ft 5 in)

Gymnastics career
- Discipline: Rhythmic gymnastics
- Country represented: Ukraine
Medal record
European Championships
Gold medal – first place	2020 Kyiv	Team
Gold medal – first place	2020 Kyiv	5 Balls
Silver medal – second place	2020 Kyiv	3 Hoops + 4 Clubs
Bronze medal – third place	2020 Kyiv	Group All-Around

Mariola Pavlivna Bodnarchuk (Ukrainian: Маріола Павлівна Боднарчук; born on 23 March 2002) is a Ukrainian former rhythmic gymnast. She won two gold, one silver, and one bronze medal at the 2020 European Championship. She went on to represent Ukraine at the 2020 Summer Olympics and finished seventh in the group all-around final.

== Gymnastics career ==
Bodnarchuk was part of the junior group that finished eighth in the 10 clubs final at the 2017 European Championships in Budapest. Additionally, Ukraine finished sixth in the team event.

Bodnarchuk became age-eligible for senior competitions in 2018. She competed as an individual at the 2018 Portimao World Challenge Cup and finished 20th in the all-around. She did not advance into any of the apparatus finals.

Bodnarchuk competed at the 2020 European Championships in Kyiv as part of Ukraine's senior group after spending time as the group's substitute. The senior group won a team gold medal alongside the junior individuals. In the group finals, Ukraine won the bronze medal in the all-around behind Israel and Azerbaijan. They then won gold in the 5 balls final and silver behind Turkey in 3 hoops and 4 clubs.

Bodnarchuk helped Ukraine win the silver medal in the all-around at the 2021 Tel Aviv Grand Prix. At the 2021 European Championships, Bodnarchuk and the group finished sixth in the all-around and earned the continental berth for the Olympic Games. Additionally, they finished seventh in the 5 balls final and sixth in the 3 hoops and 4 clubs final. Bodnarchuk represented Ukraine at the 2020 Summer Olympics alongside Anastasiya Voznyak, Yeva Meleshchuk, Daryna Duda, Mariia Vysochanska. The group finished seventh in the all-around final.
