= Ukraine at the 2019 Summer Universiade =

- Flag of Ukraine
- IOC code: UKR

in Naples, Italy 3 July 2019 – 14 July 2019
- Competitors: 160 in 12 sports
- Medals Ranked 11th: Gold 6 Silver 7 Bronze 7 Total 20

Summer Universiade appearances (overview)
- 1993; 1995; 1997; 1999; 2001; 2003; 2005; 2007; 2009; 2011; 2013; 2015; 2017; 2019; 2021; 2025; 2027

Ukraine competed at the 2019 Summer Universiade in Naples, Italy, that was held from 3 to 14 July 2019. 160 Ukrainian athletes competed in archery, athletics, basketball, diving, fencing, football, gymnastics, judo, swimming, taekwondo, tennis, and volleyball. Ukraine was not represented in rugby sevens, sailing, shooting, table tennis and water polo. The team won 20 medals, 6 of which were gold, and for the first time finished outside Top-10.

== Medal summary ==
=== Medal by sports ===
Medals by sport
Sport	1st place, gold medalist(s)	2nd place, silver medalist(s)	3rd place, bronze medalist(s)	Total
Athletics	5	3	0	8
Rhythmic gymnastics	1	3	2	6
Basketball	0	1	0	1
Archery	0	0	2	2
Taekwondo	0	0	2	2
Judo	0	0	1	1
Total	6	7	7	20

=== Medalists ===
Medal	Name	Sport	Event	Date
Gold	Yuliya Chumachenko	Athletics	Women's high jump	July 13
Gold	Maryna Bekh-Romanchuk	Athletics	Women's long jump	July 9
Gold	Olha Korsun	Athletics	Women's triple jump	July 12
Gold	Iryna Klymets	Athletics	Women's hammer throw	July 12
Gold	Mariia Mykolenko; Anastasiia Holienieva; Kateryna Klymiuk; Tetiana Melnyk	Athletics	Women's 4 × 400 metres relay	July 13
Gold	Yeva Meleshchuk	Gymnastics	Clubs	
Silver	Serhiy Reheda	Athletics	Men's hammer throw	July 8
Silver	Iryna Herashchenko	Athletics	Women's high jump	July 13
Silver	Olena Sobchuk; Mariya Filiuk; Valentyna Myronchuk	Athletics	Women's 20 kilometres walk team	July 12
Silver	Ukraine men's national basketball team: Vadym Prokopenko; Kyrylo Marchenko; Yurii Kondrakov; Ivan Tkachenko; Serhii Pavlov; Viacheslav Petrov; Artem Kovalov; Mykhailo Horobchenko; Andriy Myronenko; Vitaliy Zotov; Illia Sydorov	Basketball	Men's	July 11
Silver	Olena Diachenko; Viktoriia Fotiieva; Valeriya Khanina; Daria Murai; Anastasiya Voznyak	Gymnastics	Group all-around	
Silver	Olena Diachenko; Viktoriia Fotiieva; Valeriya Khanina; Daria Murai; Anastasiya Voznyak	Gymnastics	Group 5 balls	
Silver	Olena Diachenko; Viktoriia Fotiieva; Valeriya Khanina; Daria Murai; Anastasiya Voznyak	Gymnastics	Group 3 hoops + 4 clubs	
Bronze	Iryna Khochyna; Polina Rodionova	Archery	Women's recurve team	
Bronze	Polina Rodionova; Artem Ovchynnikov	Archery	Mixed recurve team	
Bronze	Yeva Meleshchuk	Gymnastics	Hoop	
Bronze	Yeva Meleshchuk	Gymnastics	Ribbon	
Bronze	Hanna Antykalo	Judo	Women's middleweight –70 kg	
Bronze	Denys Voronovskyi	Taekwondo	Men's welterweight –80 kg	
Bronze	Iryna Romoldanova	Taekwondo	Women's flyweight –49 kg	
