= Heath Thorpe =

Australian artistic gymnast

- Full name: Heath Thorpe
- Born: 3 September 2000 (age 26) Werribee, Victoria, Australia

Gymnastics career
- Country represented: Australia (2017–present)
- Club: New South Wales High Performance Centre
Medal record
Representing Australia
Men's artistic gymnastics
Oceania Championships
Gold medal – first place	2022 Gold Coast	Team
Gold medal – first place	2022 Gold Coast	Floor Exercise
Gold medal – first place	2023 Carrara	Team
Gold medal – first place	2023 Carrara	Floor Exercise
Silver medal – second place	2022 Gold Coast	Vault
Silver medal – second place	2023 Carrara	Horizontal Bar
Bronze medal – third place	2022 Gold Coast	Horizontal Bar

Heath Thorpe (born 3 September 2000) is an Australian artistic gymnast. He represented Australia at the 2022 World Championships and at the 2019 Summer Universiade.

== Early life and education ==
Thorpe was born 3 September 2000 in Werribee, Victoria, Australia. He grew up in rural Australia and started gymnastics at 7 years old. He moved to Brisbane at the age of 16 to train at the Gymnastics Queensland High Performance Centre. He later studied communication at the Queensland Institute of Technology.

== Gymnastics career ==
=== 2018 ===
Thorpe made his international debut as a junior at the 2018 RD761 Junior International Team Cup, where he placed third in the vault final. Thorpe then went on to make his senior international debut at the 2018 Pacific Rim Gymnastics Championships in April and qualified to the vault final, to finish fourth.

Thorpe competed at the 2018 Australian Gymnastics Championships and placed first on floor.

In October, Gymnastics Australia announced Thorpe to the 2018 World Artistic Gymnastics Championships team. While in Doha, Thorpe was announced as the alternate for the team and did not compete in the event.

=== 2019 ===
In February, Thorpe was announced to compete at the Individual Apparatus Artistic Gymnastics World Cup taking place in Melbourne, despite having had surgery to remove screws from his elbow just eight weeks before the event.

Thorpe competed at the 2019 Australian Gymnastics Championships, finishing sixth in the all-around, second on floor and third on vault in the senior international competition.

Thorpe was announced to represent his country at the 2019 Summer Universiade in Naples, Italy. Thorpe went on to qualify to the event finals, placing sixth in the vault final.

=== 2020–2021 ===
Thorpe missed out on qualifying for the Oceania quota spot for the Tokyo Olympic Games following a subpar performance at a National Team Camp in April. Despite this, Thorpe competed and finished third all around at the 2021 Australian Gymnastics Championships, hosted on the Gold Coast, in May. His success in the all around was accompanied by a first place in the team event and a second place finish on horizontal bar. Due to a hamstring injury, he could not compete in floor and vault finals, where he finished first place on both apparatus during the all around competition on day 1.

Thorpe competed in the Bundesliga for TG Allgäu in Germany throughout September and October 2021. This was his first professional competitive season. Thorpe also went on to compete in the Wase GymCup in Belgium under the Australian flag, where he placed first on floor, horizontal bar, and second on vault.

=== 2022 ===
In 2022, Thorpe submitted a request to the International Gymnastics Federation (FIG) to allow leaps to be added to the Code of Points for Men's Artistic Gymnastics. The request was denied by the FIG.

=== 2023 ===
In May, Thorpe won his first all-around title at the 2023 Australian Gymnastics Championships at the Gold Coast Sports and Leisure Centre in Carrara, Queensland. Despite this, he was not named to the Australian team for the 2023 World Artistic Gymnastics Championships in Antwerp, Belgium.

== Personal life ==
Thorpe is openly gay.

== Competitive history ==
Competitive history of Health Thorpe
Year	Event	Team	AA	FX	PH	SR	VT	PB	HB
2018	RD761 Junior International Team Cup	7					3rd place, bronze medalist(s)		
2018	Pacific Rim Championships	4					4		
2018	Australian Championships	2nd place, silver medalist(s)		1st place, gold medalist(s)					
2019	Australian Championships	1st place, gold medalist(s)	6	2nd place, silver medalist(s)		5	3rd place, bronze medalist(s)		
2019	Summer Universiade	8					6		
2021	Australian Championships	1st place, gold medalist(s)	3rd place, bronze medalist(s)						2nd place, silver medalist(s)
2021	Wase Gym Cup			1st place, gold medalist(s)			1st place, gold medalist(s)		1st place, gold medalist(s)
2022	Australian Championships	1st place, gold medalist(s)	5	2nd place, silver medalist(s)		3rd place, bronze medalist(s)	2nd place, silver medalist(s)		
2022	Oceania Championships	1st place, gold medalist(s)	4	1st place, gold medalist(s)	8	6	2nd place, silver medalist(s)	7	3rd place, bronze medalist(s)
2022	Szombathely Challenge Cup								5
2022	World Championships	22	50						
2023	DTB Pokal Team Challenge	14							
2023	Oceania Championships	1st place, gold medalist(s)		1st place, gold medalist(s)	6	8			2nd place, silver medalist(s)
2023	Australian Championships		1st place, gold medalist(s)						
2024	DTB Pokal Team Challenge	10							
2024	Luxembourg Open			2nd place, silver medalist(s)		6			3rd place, bronze medalist(s)
2024	Australian Championships		3rd place, bronze medalist(s)		9	5		17	1st place, gold medalist(s)
2024	Oceania Championships		3rd place, bronze medalist(s)						
2024	Wase Gymcup								1st place, gold medalist(s)
2025	Osijek World Cup								5
2025	World University Games	6							7
2025	World Championships								58
