= Belgium at the 2019 Summer Universiade =

- IOC code: BEL
- NOC: Belgian Olympic and Interfederal Committee

in Naples, Italy 3 – 14 July 2019
- Competitors: 41
- Medals: Gold 0 Silver 0 Bronze 0 Total 0

Summer Universiade appearances
- 1959; 1961; 1963; 1965; 1967; 1970; 1973; 1975; 1977; 1979; 1981; 1983; 1985; 1987; 1989; 1991; 1993; 1995; 1997; 1999; 2001; 2003; 2005; 2007; 2009; 2011; 2013; 2015; 2017; 2019; 2021; 2025; 2027

Belgium competed at the 2019 Summer Universiade in Naples, Italy from 3 to 14 July 2019. A total of 41 athletes competed.

== Athletics ==
Athlete	Event	Heat		Semifinal		Final	
Athlete	Event	Result	Rank	Result	Rank	Result	Rank
Stijn Baeten	Men's 1500m	3:43.49	3 Q	—N/a		3:54.26	4
Robin Hendrix	Men's 5000m	14:08.98	1 Q	—N/a		14:04.06	3rd place, bronze medalist(s)
Michael Somers	Men's 5000m	14:23.03	14 q	—N/a		14:22.78	10
Dieter Kersten	Men's 10,000m	—N/a				30:53.15	12
Frederik Ausloos	Men's pole vault	5m10	13	—N/a		Did not advance	
Ben Broeders	Men's pole vault	5m25	1 q	—N/a		5m51	3rd place, bronze medalist(s)
Sarah Missinne	Women's 100m hurdles	13.70	14 q	13.69	15	Did not advance	
Renée Eykens	Women's 800m	2:06.29	7 Q	2:02.55	3 Q	2:02.71	6
Lisa Rooms	Women's 3000m steeplechase	—N/a				10:15.76	9

== Fencing ==
Athlete	Event	Pool round		Round of 64	Round of 32	Round of 16	Quarterfinal	Semifinal	Final / BM	
Athlete	Event	Result	Seed	Opposition Score	Opposition Score	Opposition Score	Opposition Score	Opposition Score	Opposition Score	Rank
Stef De Greef	Men's foil	3-2	27	Mayakan (THA); W 15-4	Levin (USA); W 15-7	Abe (JPN); L 14-15	Did not advance			
Lucas Mottiat	Men's foil	3-3	41	Galuashvili (GEO); L 4–15	Did not advance					
Stef Van Campenhout	Men's foil	2-5	out	Did not advance						
Stef De Greef; Lucas Mottiat; Stef Van Campenhout	Men's team foil	—N/a				United States (USA); W 45-39	Russia (RUS); L 31-45	Did not advance		

== Gymnastics ==
=== Artistic gymnastics ===
Athlete	Event	Apparatus						Total	Rank	Apparatus						Total	Rank
Athlete	Event	F	PH	R	V	PB	HB	Total	Rank	F	PH	R	V	PB	HB	Total	Rank
Maxime Gentges	Men's all-around	13.550	10.425	13.400	13.200	13.550	13.350	77.475	25	Did not advance							
Justin Pesesse	Men's all-around	12.850	11.000	13.150	14.250	12.850	13.150	77.250	28	Did not advance							

=== Rhythmic Gymnastics ===
Athlete	Event	Final & Qualification					
Athlete	Event	Hoop	Ball	Clubs	Ribbon	Total	Rank
Vanina Van Puyvelde	All-around	11.450	11.000	10.900	11.150	44.500	30

== Judo ==
Athlete	Event	Round of 32	Round of 16	Quarterfinals	Semifinals	Repechage 1	Repechage 2	Repechage 3	Final / BM	
Athlete	Event	Opposition Result	Opposition Result	Opposition Result	Opposition Result	Opposition Result	Opposition Result	Opposition Result	Opposition Result	Rank
Charly Nys	Men's –73 kg	Fernando (POR); L 0-1	Did not advance							
Myriam Blavier	Women's –57 kg	Theodorakis (AUT); W 1–0	Nascimento (BRA); L 0-1	Did not advance		Ionita (ROU); W 1–0	Hsu (TPE); L 0-1	Did not advance		

== Rugby sevens ==
Team	Event	Group stage				Semifinals	Final / BM	
Team	Event	Opposition Score	Opposition Score	Opposition Score	Rank	Opposition Score	Opposition Score	Rank
Belgium women's	Women's tournament	South Africa; L 0-33	Russia; L 0-52	Argentina; L 7-19	4	Did not advance		

== Shooting ==
Athlete	Event	Qualification		Final	
Athlete	Event	Points	Rank	Points	Rank
Lieselotte Janssen	Women's 10 m air pistol	563-15x	20	Did not advance	
Jessie Kaps	Women's 10 m air rifle	614.6	55	Did not advance	
Emma Vandevyvere	Women's 10 m air rifle	619.2	36	Did not advance	

== Swimming ==
Athlete	Event	Heat		Semifinal		Final	
Athlete	Event	Time	Rank	Time	Rank	Time	Rank
Thomas Dal	Men's 200 m breaststroke	2:20.82	41	Did not advance			
Thomas Dal	Men's 200 m individual medley	2:06.90	40	Did not advance			
Thomas Dal	Men's 400 m individual medley	4:26.71	24	—N/a		Did not advance	
Juliette Dumont	Women's 50 m freestyle	26.22	24	Did not advance			
Juliette Dumont	Women's 100 m freestyle	56.52	15 Q	56.33	13	Did not advance	
Juliette Dumont	Women's 200 m freestyle	2:03.34	15 Q	2:03.89	16	Did not advance	
Juliette Dumont	Women's 50 m butterfly	28.04	35	Did not advance			
Florine Gaspard	Women's 50 m freestyle	26.76	32	Did not advance			
Florine Gaspard	Women's 50 m breaststroke	32.02	18	Did not advance			
Florine Gaspard	Women's 100 m breaststroke	1:11.79	32	Did not advance			
Florine Gaspard	Women's 200 m breaststroke	2:35.84	23	Did not advance			
Lise Michels	Women's 100 m breaststroke	1:10.93	25	Did not advance			
Lise Michels	Women's 200 m breaststroke	2:30.79	15 Q	2:30.99	15	Did not advance	

== Table tennis ==
Athlete	Event	Group stage			Round of 64	Round of 32	Round of 16	Quarterfinals	Semifinals	Final / BM	
Athlete	Event	Opposition Result	Opposition Result	Rank	Opposition Result	Opposition Result	Opposition Result	Opposition Result	Opposition Result	Opposition Result	Rank
Martin Allegro	Men's singles	Bye			Kang (KOR); W 4–1	Bluhm (GER); L 1-4	Did not advance				
Florian Cnudde	Men's singles	Bye			Garcia (CHI); W 4-0	Ho (CAN); W 4-0	Yu (CHN); L 0-4	Did not advance			
Thibaut Darcis	Men's singles	Wiecek (POL); L 1-3	Efstathiou (CYP); W 3–1	2	Manole (ROU); L 0-4	Did not advance					
Valentin Pieraert	Men's singles	Dorr (FRA); W 3–1	Hung (HKG); L 2-3	1	Warusawithana (SRI); W 4–2	Wang (TPE); L 2-4	Did not advance				
Florian Cnudde; Thibaut Darcis	Men's doubles	—N/a			Bye	Finschi / Roman (CHI); W 3–0	De Nodrest / Rembert (FRA); L 1-3	Did not advance			
Martin Allegro; Valentin Pieraert	Men's doubles	—N/a			Bye	Chaplygin / Volin (RUS); W 3–0	Lee / Kang (KOR); W 3–0	Sadamatsu / Tsuboi (JPN); L 2-4	Did not advance		
Martin Allegro; Florian Cnudde; Thibaut Darcis; Valentin Pieraert	Men's team	France (FRA); L 0-3	Saudi Arabia (KSA); W 3-0	2 Q	—N/a		Chinese Taipei (TPE); L 1-3	Did not advance			

== Taekwondo ==
Athlete	Event	Round of 32	Round of 16	Quarterfinals	Semifinals	Final	
Athlete	Event	Opposition Result	Opposition Result	Opposition Result	Opposition Result	Opposition Result	Rank
Si Mohamed Ketbi	Men's −68 kg	Suzuki (JPN); W 31–11	Kurmangazy (KAZ); W 22–2	Shukakidze (GEO); W 14–8	Vardazaryan (ARM); W 16–8	Hosseini (IRI); L 3–20	2nd place, silver medalist(s)
