= Yeva Meleshchuk =

Ukrainian rhythmic gymnast

- Full name: Yeva Yaroslavivna Meleshchuk
- Nickname: Eva
- Born: September 29, 2001 (age 24) Kyiv, Ukraine
- Height: 170 cm (5 ft 7 in)

Gymnastics career
- Discipline: Rhythmic gymnastics
- Country represented: Ukraine; (2016-present)
- Head coach: Irina Deriugina
- Assistant coaches: Anna Bessonova, Viktoria Bessonova
Medal record
Representing Ukraine
Rhythmic Gymnastics
Summer Universiade
Gold medal – first place	2019 Naples	Clubs
Bronze medal – third place	2019 Naples	Hoop
Bronze medal – third place	2019 Naples	Ribbon
European Championships
Silver medal – second place	2023 Baku	Team

Yeva Yaroslavivna Meleshchuk (Ukrainian: Єва Ярославівна Мелещук, born 29 September 2001 in Kyiv, Ukraine) is a Ukrainian group and former individual rhythmic gymnast. She is the 2019 Summer Universiade Clubs gold medalist. On national level, she is the 2018 Ukrainian National All-around champion and the 2020 Ukrainian National All-around silver medalist.

== Career ==
=== Junior ===
She competed at the 2016 Junior European Championships in Holon, Israel and placed 6th in Team competition together with Olena Diachenko and Khrystyna Pohranychna. She placed 26th in Rope and 16th in Clubs Qualifications.

=== Senior ===
In 2017, she became senior. She won bronze medal with Ribbon at the 2017 Ukrainian Championships. She competed with Ribbon at the 2017 European Championships in Budapest, Hungary and placed 6th in Team competition. In 2018, she qualified to Hoop final at World Challenge Cup Guadalajara and finished on 8th place. This was her first World Cup final. She won bronze medal in Ribbon final at Grand Prix in Holon, Israel. Yeva also competed at the 2018 European Championships and placed 12th in All-around. Same year, she won gold medal in All-around at Ukrainian Championships and earned a spot at the 2018 World Championships in Sofia, Bulgaria. She placed 28th in All-around and 5th in Team competition.

In 2019, she won bronze medal in All-around at Ukrainian Championships. She also won gold in Clubs final and silver medals in all other apparatus finals. She won silver medal in Ribbon final at Grand Prix Kyiv. At the 2019 World Challenge Cup Guadalajara she won her first World Cup medal - silver in Ball final, and placed 5th in All-around. She finished on 5th place again at the 2019 World Challenge Cup Portimao and took silver medal in Ribbon final. She competed at the 2019 Summer Universiade in Naples, Italy and won gold medal in Clubs final and bronze medal in Hoop and Ribbon finals. Her second World Championships participation was at the 2019 World Championships in Baku, Azerbaijan where she competed with Clubs and Ribbon, and helped her teammates Vlada Nikolchenko and Khrystyna Pohranychna place 5th in Team competition.

In 2020, she competed at Grand Prix Kyiv and won bronze medal in Ball final behind Alina Harnasko and Anastasiia Salos. She also took part in 2020 European Championships in Kyiv, Ukraine and finished on 6th place in All-around Final.

In 2021, she started the competition season at the 2021 World Cup Sofia and finished on 18th place in All-around and 6th place in Clubs final. Two weeks after competing as an individual in Sofia, Yeva competed in the Two weeks after competing as an individual in Sofia, competed in the 2021 World Cup Tashkent with the Ukrainian group. Also appeared in Baku and Pesaro. They also competed at the 2021 European Championships in Varna, and prior to the Olympic Games, at the Tel Aviv Grand Prix . She was selected to represent Ukraine at the 2020 Summer Olympic Games in Tokyo, Japan, where Yeva and her group (integrated to Anastasiya Voznyak, Mariia Vysochanska, Daryna Duda, Mariola Bodnarchuk and Meleshchuk) took 7th place in Group All-around final.

Yeva had announced her retirement from gymnastics in October 2021 through her social networks, while the Ukrainian team competed in the World Championship in Kitakyushu.

At the end of 2022, it was also seen through social networks that Meleshchuk had returned to the Ukrainian group along with some of her colleagues who were at the Olympic Games, such as Anastasiya Voznyak and Mariia Vysochanska Where it appears again at the Tartu Grand Prix in February 2023, where Ukraine won gold in the All-Around. They also competed in the Marbella Grand Prix, and in some of the FIG World Cup events (Palaio Faliro (Athens) and Baku), and in the 2023 Rhythmic Gymnastics European Championships in Baku, the Ukrainian team made up of Yelyzaveta Azza, Daryna Duda, Mariia Vysochanska, Diana Baieva, Anastasiya Voznyak and Meleshchuk were fourth in the all-around. Soon in the following competitions Meleshchuk and Voznyak were not selected to compete again.
