= Valeriya Khanina =

Ukrainian rhythmic gymnast

- Full name: Valeriya Dmitrievna Khanina
- Born: 13 April 1999 (age 27) Donetsk, Ukraine

Gymnastics career
- Discipline: Rhythmic gymnastics
- Country represented: Ukraine; (2014-2019)
- Club: Deriugins School
- Head coach: Albina Deriugina
- Assistant coach: Irina Deriugina
- Choreographer: Irina Blokhina
- Retired: 2019
Medal record
World Championships
Bronze medal – third place	2018 Sofia	3 Balls + 2 Ropes
European Championships
Silver medal – second place	2018 Guadalajara	Team
Silver medal – second place	2018 Guadalajara	5 Hoops
Summer Universiade
Silver medal – second place	2019 Naples	Group All-around
Silver medal – second place	2019 Naples	5 Balls
Silver medal – second place	2019 Naples	3 Hoops + 4 Clubs

Valeriya Dmitrievna Khanina (Ukrainian: Валерія Дмитрівна Ханіна; Russian: Валерия Дмитриевна Ханина; born 13 April 1999) is a Ukrainian former rhythmic gymnast. She is the 2014 Junior European ribbon silver medalist. She represented Ukraine at the 2014 Summer Youth Olympics and finished sixth in the individual all-around.

== Personal life ==
Khanina moved to Kyiv in 2013. She trained at the famous Deriugins School under Albina and Irina Deriugina. Alina Maksymenko is her sports hero, and her goal was to become a World Champion. In September 2022, she moved to Paris.

== Gymnastics career ==
=== Junior ===
Khanina competed ball and ribbon at the 2014 Junior European Championships. The Ukrainian team finished fifth with Khanina scoring 14.858 in ball and 14.983 in ribbon. Her score in ribbon was enough for her to qualify for the final. She scored 15.750 in the final and won a silver medal behind Russia's Irina Annenkova.

Khanina was then selected to compete at the 2014 Summer Youth Olympics. She finished sixth all-around in the qualification round with a total of 54.100. In the all-around finals, Khanina once again finished sixth with a total of 53.750.

=== Senior ===
In 2016 she switched from individual to group and became a member of Ukrainian national team. She was only the reserve gymnast, so she didn't get to compete at the 2016 Olympic Games in Rio.

In 2017 season, she won bronze Group All-around medal and bronze medal in 3 Balls + 2 Ropes Final at the World Cup Pesaro. In September, she competed at the 2017 World Championships and ended on 6th place in Group All-Around Final.

In 2018, she continues to competes with the Ukrainian group. They made a sweep of golds medals at Miss Valentine Cup And Irina Deriugina cup. Then they competes at Thiais GP winning gold with hoops, silver in all-around and bronze with balls and ropes. Then they participated to FIG Worlds Cup Series. They won bronze with balls and ropes at Baku, silver and bronze with hoops and balls and ropes in Tashkent. They participated to the 2018 European Championships in Guadalajara. They finished 4th in AA, winning an amazing silver medal with hoops. They competed at the World Cup Challenge Minsk before the Worlds Championships in Sofia. Then, at the Worlds, they finished 4th in the All-Around competition and winning a bronze medal with balls and ropes.

After retirement, she moved to Paris and started working as a coach in Antony GR club. She returned to competition in 2023. She won gold medal as part of a senior group at French National Championships in 2024.

== See also ==
- List of medalists at the Rhythmic Gymnastics Junior European Championships
