= Anastasiya Voznyak =

Ukrainian rhythmic gymnast (born 1998)

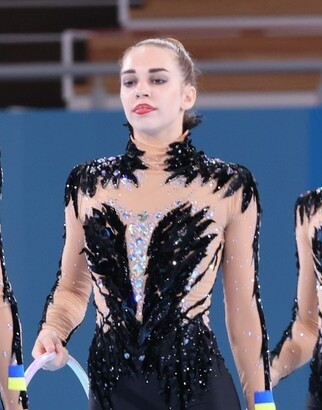
- Voznyak at the 2020 Summer Olympics

Personal information
- Full name: Anastasiya Romanivna Voznyak
- Nicknames: Nastya, Vozya
- Born: 9 December 1998 (age 27) Lviv, Ukraine
- Height: 1.70 m (5 ft 7 in)

Gymnastics career
- Discipline: Rhythmic gymnastics
- Country represented: Ukraine (2014-2021)
- Club: Deriugins School
- Head coach: Irina Deriugina
Medal record
World Championships
Bronze medal – third place	2018 Sofia	3 Balls + 2 Ropes
European Games
Silver medal – second place	2015 Baku	5 Ribbons
Silver medal – second place	2019 Minsk	3 Hoops + 4 Clubs
Bronze medal – third place	2015 Baku	6 Clubs + 2 Hoops
European Championships
Gold medal – first place	2020 Kyiv	Team
Gold medal – first place	2020 Kyiv	5 Balls
Silver medal – second place	2023 Baku	Team
Silver medal – second place	2018 Guadalajara	Team
Silver medal – second place	2018 Guadalajara	5 Hoops
Silver medal – second place	2020 Kyiv	3 Hoops + 4 Clubs
Bronze medal – third place	2020 Kyiv	Group All-around
Summer Universiade
Silver medal – second place	2019 Naples	Group All-around
Silver medal – second place	2019 Naples	5 Balls
Silver medal – second place	2019 Naples	3 Hoops + 4 Clubs

Anastasiya Romanivna Voznyak (Ukrainian: Анастасія Романівна Возняк; born 9 December 1998) is a Ukrainian former group rhythmic gymnast. She represented Ukraine at the 2016 and 2020 Summer Olympics. She won a bronze medal at the 2018 World Championships in 3 balls and 2 ropes and is a three-time European Games medalist. She won two gold medals at the 2020 European Championships and won three silver medals at the 2019 Summer Universiade.

== Gymnastics career ==
Voznyak began rhythmic gymnastics when she was five years old and moved to Kyiv in 2012 to train at the Deriugins School.

=== 2014–2016 ===
Voznyak joined the Ukrainian senior group in 2014. At the 2014 World Championships, she helped Ukraine finish seventh in the group all-around. She represented Ukraine at the 2015 European Games and won a silver medal in 5 ribbons and a bronze medal in 6 clubs and 2 hoops.

Voznyak competed alongside Olena Dmytrash, Yevgeniya Gomon, Valeriia Gudym, and Oleksandra Gridasova at the 2016 Summer Olympics in Rio de Janeiro, where she and her Ukrainian team placed seventh in the group all-around final with a total score of 34.282.

=== 2018–2019 ===
At the 2018 European Championships, Voznyak helped Ukraine win a silver medal in the team event and in the 5 hoops final. Then at the 2018 World Championships, she helped Ukraine win the bronze medal in the 3 balls and 2 ropes final. At the 2019 European Games, she helped Ukraine win the silver medal in the 3 hoops and 4 clubs final. Then at the 2019 Summer Universiade, she helped Ukraine sweep the silver medals in all the group events behind Russia. She won a gold medal with the Ukrainian group in the 3 hoops and 4 clubs final at the 2019 Sofia World Cup. They then finished ninth in the group all-around at the 2019 World Championships and qualified for the 2020 Summer Olympics.

=== 2020–2021 ===
Voznyak competed at the 2020 European Championships in Kyiv. She helped Ukraine win the bronze medal in the group all-around behind Israel and Azerbaijan. They then won gold in the 5 balls final and silver behind Turkey in 3 hoops and 4 clubs. Ukraine also won the gold medal in the team competition.

In 2021, Voznyak competed alongside Mariola Bodnarchuk, Daryna Duda, Yeva Meleshchuk, and Mariia Vysochanska at the delayed 2020 Olympic Games in Tokyo. They finished in seventh place in the group all-around final with a total score of 77.600. She announced her retirement from rhythmic gymnastics after the Olympic Games.

=== 2022–2023 ===
Voznyak came out of retirement in 2022. She competed at the 2022 World Championships and helped Ukraine finish 12th in the group all-around. At the 2023 European Championships, the Ukrainian group won a silver medal in the team event alongside the individual gymnasts. Voznyak and the Ukrainian group finished fourth in the all-around and qualified for both event finals. They finished sixth in 5 hoops and fourth in 3 ribbons and 2 balls. She left the national team again after the European Championships.
