= Luís Guilherme Porto =

Brazilian artistic gymnast (born 1997)

Luís Porto
- Full name: Luís Guilherme Cavalleri Porto
- Born: 4 June 1997 (age 29) Guaporé, Brazil
- Height: 165 cm (5 ft 5 in)

Gymnastics career
- Discipline: Men's artistic gymnastics
- Country represented: Brazil (2017–present)
- Club: Grêmio Náutico União
- Head coach: Leonardo Finco
Medal record
Representing Brazil
Men's artistic gymnastics
Pan American Games
Gold medal – first place	2019 Lima	Team
Pan American Championships
Bronze medal – third place	2018 Lima	Team
South American Games
Gold medal – first place	2018 Cochabamba	Team
South American Championships
Gold medal – first place	2017 Cochabamba	Team
Gold medal – first place	2017 Cochabamba	Floor exercise
Gold medal – first place	2017 Cochabamba	Vault
Gold medal – first place	2023 Cali	Team
Silver medal – second place	2023 Cali	Vault
Silver medal – second place	2025 Medellín	Team
Silver medal – second place	2025 Medellín	Floor exercise
Bronze medal – third place	2017 Cochabamba	Pommel horse
Summer Universiade
Bronze medal – third place	2019 Napoli	Vault
Military World Games
Silver medal – second place	2019 Wuhan	Team
Junior Pan American Championships
Gold medal – first place	2014 Aracaju	Vault
Silver medal – second place	2014 Aracaju	Team

Luís Guilherme Cavalleri Porto (born 4 June 1997) is a Brazilian artistic gymnast and a member of the national team. He participated in the 2019 Summer Universiade, placing third in vault and 18th all-around.
