= Chinese Taipei at the 2019 Summer Universiade =

- IOC code: TPE
- NOC: Chinese Taipei University Sports Federation (中華民國大專院校體育總會)
- Website: web2.ctusf.org.tw/index.php

in Naples
- Competitors: 131
- Medals Ranked 7th: Gold 9 Silver 13 Bronze 10 Total 32

Summer Universiade appearances (overview)
- 1989; 1991; 1993; 1995; 1997; 1999; 2001; 2003; 2005; 2007; 2009; 2011; 2013; 2015; 2017; 2019; 2021; 2025; 2027

Chinese Taipei competed at the 2019 Summer Universiade in Naples, Italy held from 3 to 14 July 2019.

== Medal summary ==
=== Medal by sports ===
Medals by sport
Archery	1	2	2	5
Gymnastics	2	1	1	4
Shooting	3	2	1	6
Swimming	0	0	1	1
Table tennis	0	1	1	2
Taekwondo	2	6	3	11
Tennis	1	1	1	3

=== Medalists ===
Medal	Name	Sport	Event	Date
Gold	Peng Chia-mao; Wei Chun-heng	Archery	Mixed team recurve	
Gold	Liu Wan-yu	Shooting	Women's Trap	
Gold	Lee Chih-kai	Gymnastics	Men's Pommel horse	
Gold	Tang Chia-hung	Gymnastics	Horizontal bar	
Gold	Yang Kun-pi	Shooting	Men's Trap	
Gold	Kuo Kuan-ting; Yu Ai-wen	Shooting	Mixed 10 metre air pistol	
Gold	Su Po-ya	Taekwondo	Women's –53 kg	
Gold	Su Po-ya; Chen Yu-chuang; Chuang Kuan-yu; Ma Ting-hsia	Taekwondo	Women's Team Kyorugi	
Gold	Tseng Chun-hsin	Tennis	Men's singles	
Silver	Tang Chih-chun; Wei Chun-heng	Archery	Men's team recurve	
Silver	Chen Yi-hsuan; Chen Chieh-lun	Archery	Mixed team compound	
Silver	Hsu Ping-chien; Lee Chih-kai; Tang Chia-hung	Gymnastics	Men's Team all-around	
Silver	Chen Po-kai; Huang Sheng-peng; Li Cheng-gan	Taekwondo	Men's Team Poomsae	
Silver	Jhuang Tien-yu	Taekwondo	Women's -49 kg	
Silver	Chen Yu-chuang	Taekwondo	Women's -57 kg	
Silver	Su Chia-en	Taekwondo	Women's Individual Poomsae	
Silver	Chen Yi-hsuan; Li Chieh-yu; Su Chia-en	Taekwondo	Women's team Poomsae	
Silver	Chen Po-kai; Li Chieh-yu	Taekwondo	Mixed team Poomsae	
Silver	Lee Pei-chi; Lee Ya-hsuan	Tennis	Women's doubles	
Silver	Chen Yun-yun; Lin Ying-shin; Tsai Yi-ting	Shooting	Women's 10 metre air rifle team	
Silver	Liao Cheng-ting; Peng Wang-wei; Wang Tai-wei; Yang Heng-wei	Table tennis	Men's team	
Bronze	Peng Chia-mao	Archery	Women's individual recurve	
Bronze	Chen Yi-hsuan; Lin Ming-ching	Archery	Women's team recurve	
Bronze	Lee Chih-kai	Gymnastics	Men's Individual all-around	
Bronze	Wang Hsing-hao	Swimming	Men's 200 m individual medley	
Bronze	Liu Wei-ting	Taekwondo	Men's -80 kg	
Bronze	Ho Chia-hsin; Hou Kuang-wu; Lee Meng-en; Liu Wei-ting	Taekwondo	Men's team Kyorugi	
Bronze	Chuang Kuan-yu	Taekwondo	Women's -67 kg	
Bronze	Chinese Taipei	Tennis	Men's team classification	
Bronze	Lin Ying-shin	Shooting	Women's 10 metre air rifle	
Bronze	Wang Hsing-hao	Swimming	Men's 200 m individual medley	
Bronze	Su Pei-ling; Liao Cheng-ting	Table tennis	Mixed doubles	
