= Uzbekistan at the 2019 Summer Universiade =

- Flag of Uzbekistan
- IOC code: UZB

in Naples, Italy 3 July 2019 – 14 July 2019
- Medals Ranked 19th: Gold 2 Silver 2 Bronze 4 Total 8

Summer Universiade appearances
- 1959; 1961; 1963; 1965; 1967; 1970; 1973; 1975; 1977; 1979; 1981; 1983; 1985; 1987; 1989; 1991; 1993; 1995; 1997; 1999; 2001; 2003; 2005; 2007; 2009; 2011; 2013; 2015; 2017; 2019; 2021

Uzbekistan competed at the 2019 Summer Universiade in Naples, Italy held from 3 to 14 July 2019.

== Medal summary ==
=== Medal by sports ===
Medals by sport
Judo	0	0	4	4
Taekwondo	0	1	0	1
Tennis	2	1	0	3

=== Medalists ===
Medal	Name	Sport	Event	Date
Gold	Sanjar Fayziev; Khumoyun Sultanov	Tennis	Men's doubles	July 12
Gold	Sanjar Fayziev; Khumoyun Sultanov	Tennis	Men's team classification	July 13
Silver	Khumoyun Sultanov	Tennis	Men's singles	July 13
Silver	Niyaz Pulatov	Taekwondo	Men's bantamweight (–63kg)	July 12
Bronze	Khikmatillokh Turaev	Judo	Men's lightweight (–73 kg)	July 5
Bronze	Mukhammadkarim Khurramov	Judo	Men's light heavyweight (+90 kg)	July 4
Bronze	Davlat Bobonov	Judo	Open weight	July 6
Bronze	Diyora Keldiyorova	Judo	Women's featherweight (–52 kg)	July 6
