= Malaysia at the 2019 Summer Universiade =

- Flag of Malaysia
- IOC code: MAS
- National federation: Malaysian University Sports Council
- Website: www.masum.org.my

in Naples, Italy 3 July 2019 – 14 July 2019
- Competitors: 35 in 7 sports
- Flag bearer: Farah Ann Abdul Hadi
- Medals Ranked 57th: Gold 0 Silver 0 Bronze 1 Total 1

Summer Universiade appearances (overview)
- 1985; 1987; 1989; 1991; 1993; 1995; 1997; 1999; 2001; 2003; 2005; 2007; 2009; 2011; 2013; 2015; 2017; 2019; 2021; 2025; 2027

Malaysia competed at the 2019 Summer Universiade in Naples, Italy held from 3 to 14 July 2019. The country won one bronze medal, in taekwondo.

== Medal summary ==
=== Medal by sports ===
Medals by sport
Taekwondo	0	0	1	1
Total	0	0	1	1

=== Medalists ===
Medal	Name	Sport	Event	Date
Bronze	Ahmad Nor Iman Hakim Rakib; Hamdanwahid Rinaldi; Muhammed Syafiq Zuber; Rozali Rozaimi	Taekwondo	Team Kyorugi	July 13
