= United States at the 2019 Summer Universiade =

- Flag of the United States
- IOC code: USA

in Naples, Italy 3 July 2019 – 14 July 2019
- Medals Ranked 4th: Gold 21 Silver 17 Bronze 15 Total 53

Summer Universiade appearances (overview)
- 1965; 1967; 1970; 1973; 1975; 1977; 1979; 1981; 1983; 1985; 1987; 1989; 1991; 1993; 1995; 1997; 1999; 2001; 2003; 2005; 2007; 2009; 2011; 2013; 2015; 2017; 2019; 2021; 2025; 2027

The United States competed at the 2019 Summer Universiade in Naples, Italy held from 3 to 14 July 2019.

== Medal summary ==
=== Medal by sports ===
Medals by sport
| Archery | 0 | 0 | 1 | 1 |
| Athletics | 0 | 2 | 1 | 3 |
| Basketball | 1 | 1 | 0 | 2 |
| Diving | 0 | 0 | 2 | 2 |
| Gymnastics | 0 | 0 | 1 | 1 |
| Swimming | 19 | 12 | 9 | 40 |
| Taekwondo | 1 | 1 | 1 | 3 |
| Water polo | 0 | 1 | 0 | 1 |

=== Medalists ===
| Medal | Name | Sport | Event | Date |
|---|---|---|---|---|
| Gold | Adam Heidt; Matthew Zumbo | Archery | Men's team recurve | |
| Gold | Clemson | Basketball | Men's tournament | July 11 |
| Gold | Zach Apple | Swimming | Men's 100 metre freestyle | |
| Gold | Zach Apple | Swimming | Men's 200 metre freestyle | |
| Gold | Justin Ress | Swimming | Men's 50 metre backstroke | |
| Gold | Austin Katz | Swimming | Men's 200 metre backstroke | |
| Gold | Ian Finnerty | Swimming | Men's 100 metre breaststroke | |
| Gold | Zach Apple; Dean Farris; Robert Howard; Tate Jackson; Michael Jensen | Swimming | Men's 4 × 100 metre freestyle relay | |
| Gold | Zach Apple; Justin Ress; Ian Finnerty; John Shebat; Coleman Stewart; Jonathan Tybur; Jack Saunderson; Tate Jackson | Swimming | Men's 4 × 200 metre freestyle relay | |
| Gold | Zach Apple; Dean Farris; Robert Howard; Tate Jackson; Michael Jensen | Swimming | Men's 4 × 100 metre medley relay | |
| Gold | Ky-lee Perry | Swimming | Women's 50 metre freestyle | |
| Gold | Gabby DeLoof | Swimming | Women's 100 metre freestyle | |
| Gold | Gabby DeLoof | Swimming | Women's 200 metre freestyle | |
| Gold | Kaersten Meitz | Swimming | Women's 400 metre freestyle | |
| Gold | Katharine Berkoff | Swimming | Women's 100 metre backstroke | |
| Gold | Lisa Bratton | Swimming | Women's 200 metre backstroke | |
| Gold | Dakota Luther | Swimming | Women's 200 metre butterfly | |
| Gold | Makayla Sargent | Swimming | Women's 400 metre individual medley | |
| Gold | Kaersten Meitz; Claire Rasmus; Paige Madden; Catherine DeLoof; Gabby DeLoof; Sierra Schmidt | Swimming | Women's 4 × 100 metre freestyle relay | |
| Gold | Katharine Berkoff; Emily Escobedo; Dakota Luther; Gabby DeLoof; Elise Haan; Veronica Burchill; Catherine DeLoof | Swimming | Women's 4 × 100 metre medley relay | |
| Gold | Veronica Burchill; Claire Rasmus; Catherine DeLoof; Gabby DeLoof; Claire Adams | Swimming | Women's 4 × 200 metre freestyle relay | |
| Gold | Adalis Munoz | Taekwondo | Women's individual poomsae | |
| Silver | Men's team | Water polo | Men's tournament | |
| Silver | Andrew Liskowitz | Athletics | Men's shot put | July 8 |
| Silver | Rachel Baxter | Athletics | Women's pole vault | July 11 |
| Silver | Mississippi State | Basketball | Women's tournament | July 11 |
| Silver | Tate Jackson | Swimming | Men's 100 metre freestyle | |
| Silver | Nicholas Norman | Swimming | Men's 800 metre freestyle | |
| Silver | Sean Grieshop | Swimming | Men's 400 metre individual medley | |
| Silver | Paige Madden | Swimming | Women's 200 metre freestyle | |
| Silver | Elise Haan | Swimming | Women's 50 metre backstroke | |
| Silver | Elise Haan | Swimming | Women's 100 metre backstroke | |
| Silver | Asia Seidt | Swimming | Women's 200 metre backstroke | |
| Silver | Emily Escobedo | Swimming | Women's 200 metre breaststroke | |
| Silver | Dakota Luther | Swimming | Women's 100 metre butterfly | |
| Silver | Olivia Carter | Swimming | Women's 200 metre butterfly | |
| Silver | Ella Eastin | Swimming | Women's 200 metre individual medley | |
| Silver | Genevieve Pfeifer | Swimming | Women's 400 metre individual medley | |
| Silver | Edward Jeong | Taekwondo | Men's individual poomsae | |
| Bronze | Bridget Guy | Athletics | Women's pole vault | July 11 |
| Bronze | Daria Lenz | Diving | Women's 1 metre springboard | |
| Bronze | Daria Lenz; Carolina Sculti | Diving | Women's synchronized 3 metre springboard | |
| Bronze | Laura Zeng | Gymnastics | Rhythmic individual all-around | July 13 |
| Bronze | Nicholas Norman | Swimming | Men's 1500 metre freestyle | |
| Bronze | Justin Ress | Swimming | Men's 100 metre backstroke | |
| Bronze | Clark Beach | Swimming | Men's 200 metre backstroke | |
| Bronze | Ian Finnerty | Swimming | Men's 50 metre breaststroke | |
| Bronze | Daniel Roy | Swimming | Men's 200 metre breaststroke | |
| Bronze | Coleman Stewart | Swimming | Men's 100 metre butterfly | |
| Bronze | Veronica Burchill | Swimming | Women's 100 metre freestyle | |
| Bronze | Sierra Schmidt | Swimming | Women's 400 metre freestyle | |
| Bronze | Molly Kowal | Swimming | Women's 1500 metre freestyle | |
| Bronze | Makayla Gorka; Cheyenne Lewis; Liyette Salas; Logan Weber | Taekwondo | Women's team Kyorugi | |
