= 2019 International Swimming League =

- League: International Swimming League
- Sport: Swimming
- Duration: 5 October – 21 December 2019
- Number of teams: 8

Regular season
- Season champions: (France) Energy Standard
- Season MVP: (Sweden) Sarah Sjöström (Energy Standard)

Final Match
- Champions: (France) Energy Standard
- Finals MVP: (United States) Caeleb Dressel (Cali Condors)

Seasons
- 2020 →

The 2019 International Swimming League was the inaugural edition of the International Swimming League, a professional swimming league, established in 2019. It comprised eight teams composed of both women and men. The league consisted of seven short course swimming meets which took place in seven cities around the world.

The budget for this first edition was $20 million. The France-based team Energy Standard won the inaugural ISL title in the Final Match hosted at Mandalay Bay Resort and Casino in Las Vegas.

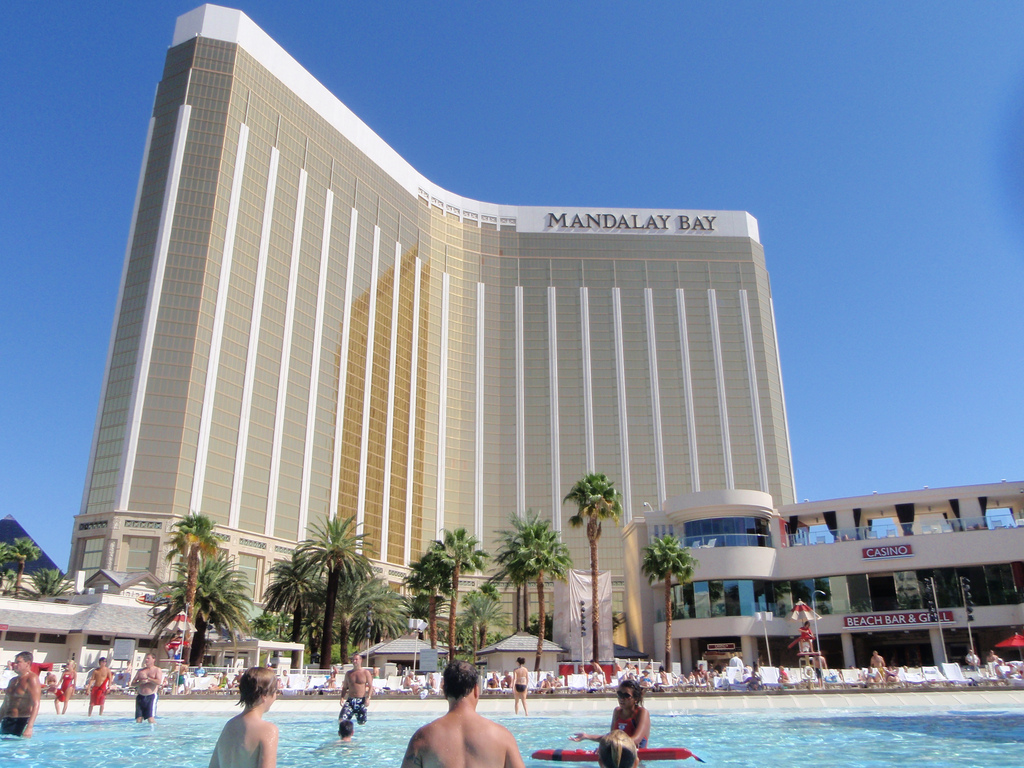
Mandalay Bay Resort and Casino hosted the first Final Match ever.

== Schedule ==
The schedule consists of six regular-season meets, followed by a Final Match in Las Vegas. At each meet four of the eight teams compete (two from American conference and two from European conference). Two of the meets are 'derby' meet, one for all four American teams and one for all four European teams.

Dates	Location	Venue	Teams	Results	MVP
Regular season
5–6 October	(United States) Indianapolis	Indiana University Natatorium	(Italy) Aqua Centurions (United States) Cali Condors (United States) DC Trident (France) Energy Standard		(Sweden) Sarah Sjöström ( (France) Energy Standard); 55.5 pts
12–13 October	(Italy) Naples	Piscina Felice Scandone	(Italy) Aqua Centurions (United States) Cali Condors (United States) DC Trident (France) Energy Standard		(United States) Caeleb Dressel ( (United States) Cali Condors); 57.5 pts
19–20 October	(United States) Lewisville	The LISD Westside Aquatic Center	(Hungary) Iron (United States) LA Current (United Kingdom) London Roar (United States) New York Breakers		(Russia) Vladimir Morozov ( (Hungary) Iron); 43.5 pts
26–27 October	(Hungary) Budapest	Danube Arena	(Hungary) Iron (United States) LA Current (United Kingdom) London Roar (United States) New York Breakers		(Hungary) Katinka Hosszú ( (Hungary) Iron); 47 pts
15–16 November	(United States) College Park	Geary F. Eppley Recreation Center	(United States) Cali Condors (United States) DC Trident (United States) LA Current (United States) New York Breakers		(United States) Caeleb Dressel ( (United States) Cali Condors); 61.5 pts
23–24 November	(United Kingdom) London	London Aquatics Centre	(Italy) Aqua Centurions (France) Energy Standard (Hungary) Iron (United Kingdom) London Roar		(South Africa) Chad le Clos ( (France) Energy Standard); 44.5 pts
Final Match
20–21 December	(United States) Las Vegas	Mandalay Bay Resort and Casino	(France) Energy Standard (United Kingdom) London Roar (United States) Cali Condors (United States) LA Current		(United States) Caeleb Dressel ( (United States) Cali Condors); 121 pts

=== Events schedule ===
A total of 37 races were held in each match (the 4x50m mixed medley relay acted as a tie breaker).

Day 1					Day 2				
No.	Event	F	M	X	No.	Event	F	M	X
1	100m Butterfly	●			20	100m Freestyle	●		
2	100m Butterfly		●		21	100m Freestyle		●	
3	50m Breaststroke	●			22	100m Breaststroke	●		
4	50m Breaststroke		●		23	100m Breaststroke		●	
5	400m Individual Medley	●			24	400m Freestyle	●		
6	400m Individual Medley		●		25	400m Freestyle		●	
7	4 × 100 m Freestyle Relay	●			26	4 × 100 m Medley Relay	●		
19	4 × 100 m Freestyle Relay		●		27	200m Individual Medley		●	
8	200m Backstroke	●			28	200m Individual Medley	●		
9	200m Backstroke		●		29	50m Butterfly		●	
10	50m Freestyle	●			30	50m Butterfly	●		
11	50m Freestyle		●		31	100m Backstroke		●	
12	4 × 100 m Medley Relay		●		32	100m Backstroke	●		
13	200m Freestyle		●		33	4x100 Freestyle Relay			●
14	200m Freestyle	●			34	200m Butterfly	●		
15	50m Backstroke		●		35	200m Butterfly		●	
16	50m Backstroke	●			36	Freestyle Skins	●		
17	200m Breaststroke		●		37	Freestyle Skins		●	
18	200m Breaststroke	●			38	4x50m Freestyle relay			●

== Teams ==
ISL teams can have a maximum roster of 32 athletes for 2019 season, with a suggested size of each club's traveling roster of 28 (14 men and 14 women). Each club will have a captain and a vice-captain of different gender.

Group A
(United States) Cali Condors		(United States) DC Trident	
Men	Women	Men	Women
(United States) Bowe Becker	(Denmark) Signe Bro	(United States) Zach Apple	(Czech Republic) Anika Apostalon
(United States) Caeleb Dressel	(United States) Mallory Comerford	(United States) Kevin Cordes	(United States) Emma Barksdale
(United States) Nic Fink	(United States) Kelsi Dahlia	(United States) Abrahm DeVine	(United States) Lisa Bratton
(United States) Townley Haas	(United States) Hali Flickinger	(United States) Ian Finnerty	(Germany) Annika Bruhn
(Denmark) Anton Ipsen	(United States) Molly Hannis	(United States) Zane Grothe	(United States) Natalie Coughlin (C)
(United States) Tate Jackson	(United States) Natalie Hinds	(United States) Zach Harting	(United States) Bethany Galat
(Poland) Radosław Kawęcki	(United States) Lilly King	(Australia) Tristan Hollard	(United States) Sarah Gibson
(Australia) Mitch Larkin (vice-captain)	(United States) Melanie Margalis	(United States) Robert Howard	(Hong Kong) Siobhán Haughey
(Poland) Kacper Majchrzak	(Canada) Kylie Masse	(United States) Jay Litherland	(Czech Republic) Simona Kubová
(United States) Justin Ress	(United States) Olivia Smoliga (C)	(United States) Cody Miller (vice-captain)	(United States) Madison Kennedy
(United States) John Shebat	(Australia) Ariarne Titmus	(United States) Giles Smith	(United States) Katie Ledecky
(Poland) Jan Świtkowski	(Poland) Katarzyna Wasick	(Serbia) Velimir Stjepanović	(Australia) Leiston Pickett
(United Kingdom) Mark Szaranek	(United States) Amanda Weir	(France) Jérémy Stravius	(Australia) Leah Neale
(United States) Andrew Wilson	(Canada) Kelsey Wog	(Greece) Andreas Vazaios	(Australia) Brianna Throssell
(France) Energy Standard		(Italy) Aqua Centurions	
Men	Women	Men	Women
(Lithuania) Simonas Bilis	(France) Charlotte Bonnet	(Greece) Apostolos Christou	(United Kingdom) Freya Anderson
(Russia) Anton Chupkov	(United Kingdom) Imogen Clark	(Italy) Santo Condorelli	(Italy) Ilaria Bianchi
(Russia) Ivan Girev	(United Kingdom) Georgia Davies	(Brazil) Breno Correia	(Australia) Georgia Bohl
(Russia) Kliment Kolesnikov	(Turkey) Viktoriya Zeynep Güneş	(Hungary) László Cseh	(Italy) Martina Carraro
(South Africa) Chad le Clos (C)	(Canada) Mary-Sophie Harvey	(Italy) Luca Dotto	(Italy) Elena Di Liddo
(United Kingdom) Max Litchfield	(Netherlands) Femke Heemskerk	(Greece) Kristian Golomeev	(Italy) Silvia Di Pietro
(France) Florent Manaudou	(France) Fantine Lesaffre	(Germany) Philip Heintz	(Germany) Franziska Hentke
(United Kingdom) Ben Proud	(Canada) Penny Oleksiak	(Australia) Travis Mahoney	(United Kingdom) Hannah Miley
(Ukraine) Mykhailo Romanchuk	(Canada) Kayla Sanchez	(Italy) Nicolò Martinenghi	(Spain) Lidón Muñoz
(Russia) Evgeny Rylov	(Australia) Emily Seebohm	(Italy) Alessandro Miressi	(Germany) Sarah Köhler
(Japan) Daiya Seto	(Belarus) Anastasiya Shkurdai	(Italy) Matteo Rivolta	(Brazil) Larissa Oliveira
(Ukraine) Sergey Shevtsov	(Sweden) Sarah Sjöström (vice-captain)	(Italy) Simone Sabbioni	(Italy) Margherita Panziera
(Belarus) Ilya Shymanovich	(Canada) Kierra Smith	(Italy) Fabio Scozzoli (vice-captain)	(Italy) Federica Pellegrini (C)
(Russia) Maxim Stupin	(Canada) Rebecca Smith	(Germany) Poul Zellmann	(Italy) Silvia Scalia
(Estonia) Kregor Zirk	(United Kingdom) Jocelyn Ulyett		(Spain) Alba Vázquez
	(United Kingdom) Kayla van der Merwe		

Group B
(United States) New York Breakers		(United States) LA Current	
Men	Women	Men	Women
(United States) Michael Andrew (vice-captain)	(Canada) Haley Black	(United States) Nathan Adrian (C)	(United States) Bailey Andison
(Brazil) Marcelo Chierighini	(Denmark) Pernille Blume	(Trinidad and Tobago) Dylan Carter	(United States) Kathleen Baker
(Brazil) João de Lucca	(United States) Ali DeLoof	(United States) Michael Chadwick	(United States) Maddie Banic
(Canada) Mack Darragh	(United States) Catie DeLoof	(United States) Jack Conger	(United States) Amy Bilquist
(Colombia) Jonathan Gómez	(United States) Gabby DeLoof	(United States) Matt Grevers	(Brazil) Jhennifer Conceição
(Germany) Marius Kusch	(United States) Emily Escobedo	(United States) Ryan Held	(United States) Ella Eastin
(Germany) Marco Koch	(Germany) Reva Foos	(United States) Chase Kalisz	(France) Béryl Gastaldello
(Australia) Clyde Lewis	(United States) Breeja Larson	(United States) Will Licon	(United States) Annie Lazor (vice-captain)
(Australia) Jack McLoughlin	(South Africa) Tayla Lovemore	(Brazil) Felipe Lima	(United States) Linnea Mack
(Ecuador) Tomas Peribonio	(United States) Lia Neal (C)	(United States) Ryan Murphy	(United States) Katie McLaughlin
(South Africa) Chris Reid	(Canada) Emily Overholt	(United States) Blake Pieroni	(Egypt) Farida Osman
(South Africa) Brad Tandy	(United Kingdom) Alys Thomas	(United States) Josh Prenot	(United States) Leah Smith
(Russia) Grigory Tarasevich	(Australia) Madison Wilson	(United States) Andrew Seliskar	(United States) Kendyl Stewart
(Canada) Markus Thormeyer	(United Kingdom) Abbie Wood	(United States) Tom Shields	(United States) Aly Tetzloff
(Hungary) Iron		(United Kingdom) London Roar	
Men	Women	Men	Women
(United States) Gunnar Bentz	(Russia) Veronika Andrusenko	(Australia) Kyle Chalmers	(Australia) Minna Atherton
(Hungary) Richárd Bohus	(Jamaica) Alia Atkinson	(Germany) Christian Diener	(Australia) Holly Barratt
(Norway) Henrik Christiansen	(Hungary) Katalin Burián	(Australia) Alexander Graham	(Spain) Mireia Belmonte
(Switzerland) Jérémy Desplanches	(Netherlands) Kim Busch	(Brazil) Guilherme Guido	(Australia) Bronte Campbell
(Romania) Robert Glință	(Belgium) Kimberly Buys	(United Kingdom) James Guy	(Australia) Cate Campbell
(Hungary) Gergely Gyurta	(Hungary) Katinka Hosszú (C)	(Canada) Yuri Kisil	(Australia) Jessica Hansen
(Hungary) Dominik Kozma	(Hungary) Zsuzsanna Jakabos	(Canada) Finlay Knox	(United Kingdom) Holly Hibbott
(Hungary) Kristof Milak	(Hungary) Ajna Késely	(Brazil) Vini Lanza	(Hungary) Boglárka Kapás
(Russia) Vladimir Morozov	(Netherlands) Ranomi Kromowidjojo	(Australia) Cameron McEvoy	(Australia) Emma McKeon
(United Kingdom) Ross Murdoch	(Finland) Jenna Laukkanen	(United Kingdom) Adam Peaty (C)	(United Kingdom) Siobhan-Marie O'Connor
(Sweden) Erik Persson	(Belgium) Fanny Lecluyse	(Russia) Kirill Prigoda	(Denmark) Jeanette Ottesen
(Slovenia) Peter John Stevens	(Denmark) Mie Nielsen	(United Kingdom) Duncan Scott	(Canada) Sydney Pickrem
(Hungary) Szebasztián Szabó	(Netherlands) Kira Toussaint	(Australia) Matt Wilson	(United Kingdom) Sarah Vasey
(Hungary) Ádám Telegdy	(Spain) Jessica Vall	(Australia) Elijah Winnington	(France) Marie Wattel
(Belgium) Pieter Timmers	(Switzerland) Maria Ugolkova		
(Hungary) Dávid Verrasztó			

== Standings ==
2019 ISL Final Match

Pos.	Team	Total score
1	(France) Energy Standard	453.5
2	(United Kingdom) London Roar	444
3	(United States) Cali Condors	415.5
4	(United States) LA Current	318

2019 ISL Regular season

Pos.	Team	IND (United States)	NAP (Italy)	LEW (United States)	BUD (Hungary)	COP (United States)	LON (United Kingdom)	Total score	Points
1	(France) Energy Standard	539	493				467.5	1499.5	12
2	(United Kingdom) London Roar			484.5	505.5		458.5	1448.5	11
3	(United States) Cali Condors	457	490.5			489.5		1437	9
4	(United States) LA Current			457	408	495		1360	9
5	(Hungary) Iron			402	425		369.5	1196.5	7
6	(United States) DC Trident	330.5	322			322.5		975	6
7	(Italy) Aqua Centurions	300.5	321.5				335.5	957.5	3
8	(United States) NY Breakers			278.5	292.5	315		886	3

Key
Colour	Result
Gold	Winner
Purple	Did not finish (DNF)
Black	Disqualified (DSQ)
White	Did not start (DNS)
Blank	Withdrew entry from the event (WD)

American Conference

Pos.	Team	IND (United States)	NAP (Italy)	LEW (United States)	BUD (Hungary)	COP (United States)	Total score	Points
1	(United States) Cali Condors	457	490.5			489.5	1437	9
2	(United States) LA Current			457	408	495	1360	9
3	(United States) DC Trident	330.5	322			322.5	975	6
4	(United States) NY Breakers			278.5	292.5	315	886	3

European Conference

Pos.	Team	IND (United States)	NAP (Italy)	LEW (United States)	BUD (Hungary)	LON (United Kingdom)	Total score	Points
1	(France) Energy Standard	539	493			467.5	1499.5	12
2	(United Kingdom) London Roar			484.5	505.5	458.5	1448.5	11
3	(Hungary) Iron			402	425	369.5	1196.5	7
4	(Italy) Aqua Centurions	300.5	321.5			335.5	957.5	3

== Event winners ==
=== 50 m freestyle ===
Meet	Men			Women		
Meet	Winner	Team	Time	Winner	Team	Time
Indianapolis	(France) Florent Manaudou	(France) Energy Standard	20.77	(Sweden) Sarah Sjöström	(France) Energy Standard	23.58
Naples	(United States) Caeleb Dressel	(United States) Cali Condors	20.64	(Sweden) Sarah Sjöström	(France) Energy Standard	23.63
Lewisville	(Russia) Vladimir Morozov	(Hungary) Iron	20.93	(Australia) Cate Campbell	(United Kingdom) London Roar	23.33
Budapest	(Russia) Vladimir Morozov	(Hungary) Iron	20.68	(Netherlands) Ranomi Kromowidjojo	(Hungary) Iron	23.29
College Park	(United States) Caeleb Dressel	(United States) Cali Condors	20.81	(France) Béryl Gastaldello	(United States) LA Current	23.81
London	(France) Florent Manaudou	(France) Energy Standard	20.57	(Australia) Cate Campbell	(United Kingdom) London Roar	23.48
Las Vegas	(United States) Caeleb Dressel	(United States) Cali Condors	20.24 WR	(Sweden) Sarah Sjöström	(France) Energy Standard	23.43

=== 100 m freestyle ===
Meet	Men			Women		
Meet	Winner	Team	Time	Winner	Team	Time
Indianapolis	(South Africa) Chad le Clos	(France) Energy Standard	46.96	(Sweden) Sarah Sjöström	(France) Energy Standard	51.76
Naples	(United States) Caeleb Dressel	(United States) Cali Condors	45.77	(Sweden) Sarah Sjöström	(France) Energy Standard	51.66
Lewisville	(Australia) Kyle Chalmers	(United Kingdom) London Roar	46.22	(Australia) Cate Campbell	(United Kingdom) London Roar	51.34
Budapest	(Australia) Kyle Chalmers	(United Kingdom) London Roar	45.77	(Australia) Emma McKeon	(United Kingdom) London Roar	51.02
Budapest	(Australia) Kyle Chalmers	(United Kingdom) London Roar	45.77	(Australia) Cate Campbell	(United Kingdom) London Roar	51.02
College Park	(United States) Caeleb Dressel	(United States) Cali Condors	45.69	(Hong Kong) Siobhán Haughey	(United States) DC Trident	51.81
College Park	(United States) Caeleb Dressel	(United States) Cali Condors	45.69	(France) Béryl Gastaldello	(United States) LA Current	51.81
London	(Russia) Vladimir Morozov	(Hungary) Iron	46.14	(Australia) Cate Campbell	(United Kingdom) London Roar	51.20
Las Vegas	(United States) Caeleb Dressel	(United States) Cali Condors	45.22	(Australia) Emma McKeon	(United Kingdom) London Roar	51.38

=== 200 m freestyle ===
Meet	Men			Women		
Meet	Winner	Team	Time	Winner	Team	Time
Indianapolis	(Brazil) Breno Correia	(Italy) Aqua Centurions	1:44.21	(Hong Kong) Siobhán Haughey	(United States) DC Trident	1:52.88
Naples	(Brazil) Breno Correia	(Italy) Aqua Centurions	1:43.56	(Hong Kong) Siobhán Haughey	(United States) DC Trident	1:52.01
Lewisville	(Australia) Alexander Graham	(United Kingdom) London Roar	1:41.58	(Australia) Emma McKeon	(United Kingdom) London Roar	1:53.58
Budapest	(Australia) Alexander Graham	(United Kingdom) London Roar	1:42.37	(Australia) Emma McKeon	(United Kingdom) London Roar	1:53.18
College Park	(United States) Blake Pieroni	(United States) LA Current	1:43.48	(Hong Kong) Siobhán Haughey	(United States) DC Trident	1:51.99
London	(Australia) Alexander Graham	(United Kingdom) London Roar	1:42.55	(Canada) Kayla Sanchez	(France) Energy Standard	1:52.72
Las Vegas	(Australia) Alexander Graham	(United Kingdom) London Roar	1:41.74	(France) Charlotte Bonnet	(France) Energy Standard	1:52.88

=== 400 m freestyle ===
Meet	Men			Women		
Meet	Winner	Team	Time	Winner	Team	Time
Indianapolis	(United States) Zane Grothe	(United States) DC Trident	3:41.64	(United States) Katie Ledecky	(United States) DC Trident	3:54.06
Naples	(United States) Zane Grothe	(United States) DC Trident	3:41.03	(Australia) Ariarne Titmus	(United States) Cali Condors	3:58.34
Lewisville	(Australia) Elijah Winnington	(United Kingdom) London Roar	3:38.84	(United Kingdom) Holly Hibbott	(United Kingdom) London Roar	4:02.28
Budapest	(Australia) Elijah Winnington	(United Kingdom) London Roar	3:38.30	(Hungary) Ajna Késely	(Hungary) Iron	4:01.27
College Park	(United States) Zane Grothe	(United States) DC Trident	3:40.73	(United States) Hali Flickinger	(United States) Cali Condors	3:58.95
London	(Norway) Henrik Christiansen	(Hungary) Iron	3:40.14	(United Kingdom) Holly Hibbott	(United Kingdom) London Roar	3:57.96
Las Vegas	(United Kingdom) James Guy	(United Kingdom) London Roar	3:39.99	(Australia) Ariarne Titmus	(United States) Cali Condors	3:56.21

=== 50 m backstroke ===
Meet	Men			Women		
Meet	Winner	Team	Time	Winner	Team	Time
Indianapolis	(Russia) Kliment Kolesnikov	(France) Energy Standard	23.29	(United States) Olivia Smoliga	(United States) Cali Condors	26.41
Naples	(France) Jérémy Stravius	(United States) DC Trident	23.13	(United States) Olivia Smoliga	(United States) Cali Condors	26.26
Lewisville	(Brazil) Guilherme Guido	(United Kingdom) London Roar	23.06	(Australia) Minna Atherton	(United Kingdom) London Roar	25.99
Budapest	(Brazil) Guilherme Guido	(United Kingdom) London Roar	22.55	(Australia) Minna Atherton	(United Kingdom) London Roar	25.81
College Park	(United States) Matthew Grevers	(United States) LA Current	23.38	(France) Béryl Gastaldello	(United States) LA Current	26.18
College Park	(United States) Michael Andrew	(United States) NY Breakers	23.38	(France) Béryl Gastaldello	(United States) LA Current	26.18
London	(Brazil) Guilherme Guido	(United Kingdom) London Roar	22.82	(Australia) Minna Atherton	(United Kingdom) London Roar	26.05
Las Vegas	(Brazil) Guilherme Guido	(United Kingdom) London Roar	22.77	(United States) Olivia Smoliga	(United States) Cali Condors	25.89

=== 100 m backstroke ===
Meet	Men			Women		
Meet	Winner	Team	Time	Winner	Team	Time
Indianapolis	(Russia) Kliment Kolesnikov	(France) Energy Standard	50.16	(United States) Olivia Smoliga	(United States) Cali Condors	56.38
Naples	(Russia) Evgeny Rylov	(France) Energy Standard	50.25	(United States) Olivia Smoliga	(United States) Cali Condors	56.24
Lewisville	(Brazil) Guilherme Guido	(United Kingdom) London Roar	50.16	(Australia) Minna Atherton	(United Kingdom) London Roar	55.43
Budapest	(Brazil) Guilherme Guido	(United Kingdom) London Roar	49.61	(Australia) Minna Atherton	(United Kingdom) London Roar	54.89 WR
College Park	(United States) Matthew Grevers	(United States) LA Current	50.67	(United States) Olivia Smoliga	(United States) Cali Condors	55.97
London	(Russia) Evgeny Rylov	(France) Energy Standard	49.75	(Australia) Minna Atherton	(United Kingdom) London Roar	55.29
Las Vegas	(Brazil) Guilherme Guido	(United Kingdom) London Roar	49.50	(Australia) Minna Atherton	(United Kingdom) London Roar	55.09

=== 200 m backstroke ===
Meet	Men			Women		
Meet	Winner	Team	Time	Winner	Team	Time
Indianapolis	(Russia) Evgeny Rylov	(France) Energy Standard	1:49.68	(Canada) Kylie Masse	(United States) Cali Condors	2:01.89
Naples	(Russia) Evgeny Rylov	(France) Energy Standard	1:49.24	(Canada) Kylie Masse	(United States) Cali Condors	2:01.90
Lewisville	(United States) Ryan Murphy	(United States) LA Current	1:49.87	(Australia) Minna Atherton	(United Kingdom) London Roar	2:00.58
Budapest	(United States) Ryan Murphy	(United States) LA Current	1:49:40	(Australia) Minna Atherton	(United Kingdom) London Roar	1:59.48
College Park	(Poland) Radosław Kawęcki	(United States) Cali Condors	1:51:68	(United States) Kathleen Baker	(United States) LA Current	2:01.57
London	(Russia) Evgeny Rylov	(France) Energy Standard	1:49.67	(Australia) Minna Atherton	(United Kingdom) London Roar	1:59.25
Las Vegas	(United States) Ryan Murphy	(United States) LA Current	1:48.81	(United States) Kathleen Baker	(United States) LA Current	2:01.22

=== 50 m breaststroke ===
Meet	Men			Women		
Meet	Winner	Team	Time	Winner	Team	Time
Indianapolis	(Italy) Nicolò Martinenghi	(Italy) Aqua Centurions	26.03	(United States) Lilly King	(United States) Cali Condors	29.23
Naples	(Italy) Nicolò Martinenghi	(Italy) Aqua Centurions	25.98	(United States) Lilly King	(United States) Cali Condors	29.12
Lewisville	(Russia) Vladimir Morozov	(Hungary) Iron	26.15	(Jamaica) Alia Atkinson	(Hungary) Iron	29.31
Budapest	(United Kingdom) Adam Peaty	(United Kingdom) London Roar	25.85	(Jamaica) Alia Atkinson	(Hungary) Iron	29.27
College Park	(Brazil) Felipe Lima	(United States) LA Current	25.92	(United States) Lilly King	(United States) Cali Condors	29.00
London	(Italy) Fabio Scozzoli	(Italy) Aqua Centurions	25.62	(Jamaica) Alia Atkinson	(Hungary) Iron	29.32
Las Vegas	(United States) Nic Fink	(United States) Cali Condors	25.75	(United States) Lilly King	(United States) Cali Condors	28.90

=== 100 m breaststroke ===
Meet	Men			Women		
Meet	Winner	Team	Time	Winner	Team	Time
Indianapolis	(Belarus) Ilya Shymanovich	(France) Energy Standard	56.71	(United States) Lilly King	(United States) Cali Condors	1:04.43
Naples	(Belarus) Ilya Shymanovich	(France) Energy Standard	56.35	(United States) Lilly King	(United States) Cali Condors	1:04.21
Lewisville	(Brazil) Felipe Lima	(United States) LA Current	57.17	(United States) Breeja Larson	(United States) New York Breakers	1:03.80
Budapest	(United Kingdom) Adam Peaty	(United Kingdom) London Roar	56.19	(Jamaica) Alia Atkinson	(Hungary) Iron	1:03.84
College Park	(United States) Ian Finnerty	(United States) DC Trident	56.29	(United States) Lilly King	(United States) Cali Condors	1:03.00
London	(United Kingdom) Adam Peaty	(United Kingdom) London Roar	56.18	(Jamaica) Alia Atkinson	(Hungary) Iron	1:03.94
Las Vegas	(United Kingdom) Adam Peaty	(United Kingdom) London Roar	55.92	(United States) Lilly King	(United States) Cali Condors	1:03.71

=== 200 m breaststroke ===
Meet	Men			Women		
Meet	Winner	Team	Time	Winner	Team	Time
Indianapolis	(Russia) Anton Chupkov	(France) Energy Standard	2:04.03	(United States) Lilly King	(United States) Cali Condors	2:18.25
Naples	(Belarus) Ilya Shymanovich	(France) Energy Standard	2:04.60	(United States) Lilly King	(United States) Cali Condors	2:19.48
Lewisville	(Australia) Matthew Wilson	(United Kingdom) London Roar	2:03.93	(United States) Annie Lazor	(United States) LA Current	2:20.05
Budapest	(Germany) Marco Koch	(Hungary) Iron	2:04.27	(United States) Emily Escobedo	(United States) NY Breakers	2:18.73
College Park	(United States) Ian Finnerty	(United States) DC Trident	2:02.76	(United States) Lilly King	(United States) Cali Condors	2:17.78
London	(Russia) Anton Chupkov	(France) Energy Standard	2:02.98	(Canada) Sydney Pickrem	(United Kingdom) London Roar	2:19.21
Las Vegas	(United States) Nic Fink	(United States) Cali Condors	2:02.34	(United States) Lilly King	(United States) Cali Condors	2:17.03

=== 50 m butterfly ===
Meet	Men			Women		
Meet	Winner	Team	Time	Winner	Team	Time
Indianapolis	(France) Florent Manaudou	(France) Energy Standard	22.66	(Sweden) Sarah Sjöström	(France) Energy Standard	25.16
Naples	(United States) Caeleb Dressel	(United States) Cali Condors	22.34	(Sweden) Sarah Sjöström	(France) Energy Standard	24.98
Lewisville	(Hungary) Szebasztián Szabó	(Hungary) Iron	22.47	(France) Béryl Gastaldello	(United States) LA Current	25.15
Budapest	(Hungary) Szebasztián Szabó	(Hungary) Iron	22.20	(France) Béryl Gastaldello	(United States) LA Current	24.92
Budapest	(Hungary) Szebasztián Szabó	(Hungary) Iron	22.20	(Australia) Holly Barratt	(United Kingdom) London Roar	24.92
College Park	(United States) Caeleb Dressel	(United States) Cali Condors	22.21	(France) Béryl Gastaldello	(United States) LA Current	24.81
London	(Hungary) Szebasztián Szabó	(Hungary) Iron	22.13	(Sweden) Sarah Sjöström	(France) Energy Standard	24.83
Las Vegas	(United States) Caeleb Dressel	(United States) Cali Condors	22.06	(France) Béryl Gastaldello	(United States) LA Current	24.88

=== 100 m butterfly ===
Meet	Men			Women		
Meet	Winner	Team	Time	Winner	Team	Time
Indianapolis	(South Africa) Chad le Clos	(France) Energy Standard	49.65	(Sweden) Sarah Sjöström	(France) Energy Standard	55.65
Naples	(South Africa) Chad le Clos	(France) Energy Standard	49.35	(United States) Kelsi Dahlia	(United States) Cali Condors	55.91
Lewisville	(United States) Tom Shields	(United States) LA Current	49.50	(Australia) Emma McKeon	(United Kingdom) London Roar	55.91
Budapest	(United States) Tom Shields	(United States) LA Current	49.39	(Australia) Emma McKeon	(United Kingdom) London Roar	55.39
College Park	(United States) Caeleb Dressel	(United States) Cali Condors	49.16	(United States) Kelsi Dahlia	(United States) Cali Condors	55.78
London	(South Africa) Chad le Clos	(France) Energy Standard	49.34	(Australia) Emma McKeon	(United Kingdom) London Roar	55.95
Las Vegas	(United States) Caeleb Dressel	(United States) Cali Condors	49.10	(United States) Kelsi Dahlia	(United States) Cali Condors	55.35

=== 200 m butterfly ===
Meet	Men			Women		
Meet	Winner	Team	Time	Winner	Team	Time
Indianapolis	(South Africa) Chad le Clos	(France) Energy Standard	1:52.66	(United States) Hali Flickinger	(United States) Cali Condors	2:05.42
Naples	(South Africa) Chad le Clos	(France) Energy Standard	1:50.60	(United States) Megan Kingsley	(United States) Cali Condors	2:05.45
Lewisville	(Hungary) Kristof Milak	(Hungary) Iron	1:50.94	(Hungary) Katinka Hosszú	(Hungary) Iron	2:05.52
Budapest	(Hungary) Kristof Milak	(Hungary) Iron	1:49.98	(Hungary) Katinka Hosszú	(Hungary) Iron	2:05.37
College Park	(United States) Tom Shields	(United States) LA Current	1:51.51	(United States) Hali Flickinger	(United States) Cali Condors	2:03.81
London	(South Africa) Chad le Clos	(France) Energy Standard	1:51.97	(Hungary) Katinka Hosszú	(Hungary) Iron	2:03.94
Las Vegas	(Japan) Daiya Seto	(France) Energy Standard	1:48.77	(United States) Hali Flickinger	(United States) Cali Condors	2:05.12

=== 200 m individual medley ===
Meet	Men			Women		
Meet	Winner	Team	Time	Winner	Team	Time
Indianapolis	(Australia) Mitch Larkin	(United States) Cali Condors	1:52.93	(United States) Melanie Margalis	(United States) Cali Condors	2:04.18
Naples	(Greece) Andreas Vazaios	(United States) DC Trident	1:53.44	(United States) Melanie Margalis	(United States) Cali Condors	2:05.17
Naples	(Australia) Mitch Larkin	(United States) Cali Condors	1:53.44	(United States) Melanie Margalis	(United States) Cali Condors	2:05.17
Lewisville	(United States) Andrew Seliskar	(United States) LA Current	1:54.17	(Hungary) Katinka Hosszú	(Hungary) Iron	2:06.22
Budapest	(United States) Andrew Seliskar	(United States) LA Current	1:53.11	(Hungary) Katinka Hosszú	(Hungary) Iron	2:05.11
College Park	(Greece) Andreas Vazaios	(United States) DC Trident	1:52.95	(United States) Melanie Margalis	(United States) Cali Condors	2:05.18
London	(United Kingdom) Duncan Scott	(United Kingdom) London Roar	1:53.97	(Hungary) Katinka Hosszú	(Hungary) Iron	2:04.16
Las Vegas	(Japan) Daiya Seto	(France) Energy Standard	1:50.76	(Canada) Sydney Pickrem	(United Kingdom) London Roar	2:04.85

=== 400 m individual medley ===
Meet	Men			Women		
Meet	Winner	Team	Time	Winner	Team	Time
Indianapolis	(United States) Jay Litherland	(United States) DC Trident	4:06.29	(United States) Melanie Margalis	(United States) Cali Condors	4:25.77
Naples	(United States) Jay Litherland	(United States) DC Trident	4:06.35	(United States) Melanie Margalis	(United States) Cali Condors	4:24.95
Lewisville	(United States) Andrew Seliskar	(United States) LA Current	4:06.30	(Hungary) Katinka Hosszú	(Hungary) Iron	4:26.32
Budapest	(United States) Andrew Seliskar	(United States) LA Current	4:03.28	(Hungary) Katinka Hosszú	(Hungary) Iron	4:27.27
College Park	(United States) Andrew Seliskar	(United States) LA Current	4:02.88	(United States) Melanie Margalis	(United States) Cali Condors	4:24.46
London	(Russia) Maxim Stupin	(France) Energy Standard	4:04.39	(Hungary) Katinka Hosszú	(Hungary) Iron	4:25.24
Las Vegas	(Japan) Daiya Seto	(France) Energy Standard	3:54.81 WR	(United States) Melanie Margalis	(United States) Cali Condors	4:24.15

=== 4 × 100 m freestyle relay ===
Meet	Men		Women	
Meet	Winner	Time	Winner	Time
Indianapolis	(France) Energy Standard	3:08.77	(France) Energy Standard	3:28.63
Naples	(France) Energy Standard	3:07.58	(France) Energy Standard	3:28.77
Lewisville	(United States) LA Current	3:08.00	(United Kingdom) London Roar	3:27.90
Budapest	(Hungary) Iron	3:06.50	(United Kingdom) London Roar	3:28.11
College Park	(United States) Cali Condors	3:08.52	(United States) Cali Condors	3:29.38
London	(Italy) Aqua Centurions	3:07.51	(France) Energy Standard	3:26.55
Las Vegas	(United Kingdom) London Roar	3:05.11	(France) Energy Standard	3:26.48

=== 4 × 100 m medley relay ===
Meet	Men		Women	
Meet	Winner	Time	Winner	Time
Indianapolis	(France) Energy Standard	3:23.11	(United States) Cali Condors	3:49.06
Naples	(Italy) Aqua Centurions	3:24.13	(United States) Cali Condors	3:47.46
Lewisville	(United Kingdom) London Roar	3:23.65	(United Kingdom) London Roar	3:47.91
Budapest	(United Kingdom) London Roar	3:21.64	(United Kingdom) London Roar	3:47.39
College Park	(United States) LA Current	3:23.63	(United States) Cali Condors	3:47.45
London	(France) Energy Standard	3:23.14	(United Kingdom) London Roar	3:46.99
Las Vegas	(France) Energy Standard	3:21.42	(United States) Cali Condors	3:46.82

=== 4 × 100 m mixed freestyle relay ===
Meet	Winner	Time
Indianapolis	(France) Energy Standard	3:18.45
Naples	(France) Energy Standard	3:17.09
Lewisville	(United Kingdom) London Roar	3:17.54
Budapest	(United Kingdom) London Roar	3:17.05
College Park	(United States) Cali Condors	3:18.56
London	(United Kingdom) London Roar	3:16.04
Las Vegas	(France) Energy Standard	3:15.97

=== 50 m freestyle skins ===
Meet	Men			Women		
Meet	Winner	Team	Time	Winner	Team	Time
Indianapolis	(France) Florent Manaudou	(France) Energy Standard	22.97	(Sweden) Sarah Sjöström	(France) Energy Standard	25.11
Naples	(United States) Caeleb Dressel	(United States) Cali Condors	21.33	(Sweden) Sarah Sjöström	(France) Energy Standard	25.03
Lewisville	(Russia) Vladimir Morozov	(Hungary) Iron	22.21	(Netherlands) Ranomi Kromowidjojo	(Hungary) Iron	24.46
Budapest	(Australia) Kyle Chalmers	(United Kingdom) London Roar	21.76	(Netherlands) Ranomi Kromowidjojo	(Hungary) Iron	24.28
College Park	(United States) Caeleb Dressel	(United States) Cali Condors	21.25	(France) Béryl Gastaldello	(United States) LA Current	24.46
London	(Russia) Vladimir Morozov	(Hungary) Iron	21.78	(Netherlands) Ranomi Kromowidjojo	(Hungary) Iron	24.19
Las Vegas	(United States) Caeleb Dressel	(United States) Cali Condors	21.46	(Sweden) Sarah Sjöström	(France) Energy Standard	24.32

== Statistics ==
Rank	Player	Team	Points	Races won
1	(Sweden) Sarah Sjöström	(France) Energy Standard	243.5	12
2	(United States) Caeleb Dressel	(United States) Cali Condors	240	14
3	(Australia) Emma McKeon	(United Kingdom) London Roar	192	7
4	(South Africa) Chad le Clos	(France) Energy Standard	190.5	8
5	(United States) Olivia Smoliga	(United States) Cali Condors	174.5	6
6	(France) Florent Manaudou	(France) Energy Standard	169.5	6
7	(Australia) Cate Campbell	(United Kingdom) London Roar	165.5	5
8	(United States) Lilly King	(United States) Cali Condors	157.5	12
9	(Australia) Minna Atherton	(United Kingdom) London Roar	157	10
10	(France) Béryl Gastaldello	(United States) LA Current	156	7
