= Swimming at the 2019 Summer Universiade =

Swimming at the XXX Summer Universiade
- Venue: Scandone Swimming Pool
- Dates: 4–10 July 2019

Swimming was contested at the 2019 Summer Universiade from 4 to 10 July 2019 at the Scandone Swimming Pool in Naples.

== Medal summary ==
=== Medal table ===
* Host nation (Italy)

Rank	Nation	Gold	Silver	Bronze	Total
1	United States	19	12	9	40
2	Japan	6	7	7	20
3	Russia	6	6	6	18
4	South Africa	5	1	0	6
5	Great Britain	2	2	2	6
6	Italy*	1	5	5	11
7	Australia	1	1	3	5
8	Brazil	1	1	2	4
9	Sweden	1	0	0	1
10	Germany	0	2	1	3
11	France	0	1	0	1
12	Belarus	0	0	1	1
12	Canada	0	0	1	1
12	Chinese Taipei	0	0	1	1
12	Poland	0	0	1	1
12	South Korea	0	0	1	1
Totals (16 entries)		42	38	40	120

=== Men's events ===
Event	Gold		Silver		Bronze	
50 m freestyle	David Cumberlidge; Great Britain	21.97	Kosuke Matsui; Japan	22.26	Daniil Markov; Russia	22.39
100 m freestyle	Zach Apple; United States	48.01	Tate Jackson; United States	48.29	Marco Antônio Ferreira; Brazil	48.57
200 m freestyle	Zach Apple; United States	1:46.80	Nikolay Snegirev; Russia	1:46.97	Stefano Di Cola; Italy	1:47.86
400 m freestyle	Keisuke Yoshida; Japan	3:49.48	Matteo Ciampi; Italy	3:50.04	Anton Nikitin; Russia	3:50.41
800 m freestyle	Anton Nikitin; Russia	7:56.65	Nicholas Norman; United States	7:57.95	Filip Zaborowski; Poland	7:58.27
1500 m freestyle	Victor Johansson; Sweden	15:01.76	Alessio Occhipinti; Italy	15:07.36	Nicholas Norman; United States	15:09.29
50 m backstroke	Justin Ress; United States Zane Waddell; South Africa	24.48	None awarded		Grigoriy Tarasevich; Russia	24.94
100 m backstroke	Grigoriy Tarasevich; Russia	53.51	Yohann Ndoye-Brouard; France	53.80	Justin Ress; United States	53.81
200 m backstroke	Austin Katz; United States	1:55.65	Grigoriy Tarasevich; Russia	1:57.91	Clark Beach; United States	1:57.96
50 m breaststroke	Kirill Prigoda; Russia	26.99	Michael Houlie; South Africa	27.19	Ian Finnerty; United States	27.25
100 m breaststroke	Ian Finnerty; United States	59.49; UR	Kirill Prigoda; Russia	59.50	Yuya Hinomoto; Japan	59.72
200 m breaststroke	Kirill Prigoda; Russia	2:08.88	Ilia Khomenko; Russia	2:09.42	Daniel Roy; United States	2:09.63
50 m butterfly	William Yang; Australia	23.32	Yuuya Tanaka; Japan	23.35	Grigori Pekarski; Belarus	23.47
100 m butterfly	Shinnosuke Ishikawa; Japan Egor Kuimov; Russia	52.05	None awarded		Coleman Stewart; United States	52.11
200 m butterfly	Aleksandr Kudashev; Russia	1:55.63	Nao Horomura; Japan	1:55.94	Takumi Terada; Japan	1:55.99
200 m individual medley	Juran Mizohata; Japan	1:58.88	Joe Litchfield; Great Britain	1:59.28	Wang Hsing-hao; Chinese Taipei	1:59.87
400 m individual medley	Yuki Ikari; Japan	4:12.54	Sean Grieshop; United States	4:13.90	Maxim Stupin; Russia	4:15.37
4 × 100 m freestyle relay	United States (USA); Zach Apple (47.79); Dean Farris (47.48); Robert Howard (47.74); Tate Jackson (48.02); Michael Jensen^{[a]}	3:11.03	Brazil (BRA); Luiz Gustavo Borges (49.57); Marco Antônio Ferreira (48.00); Gabriel Ogawa (49.57); Felipe de Souza (48.13)	3:15.27	Italy (ITA); Ivano Vendrame (48.91); Alessandro Bori (48.87); Davide Nardini (49.10); Giovanni Izzo (49.03)	3:15.91
4 × 200 m freestyle relay	United States (USA); Dean Farris (1:48.73); Grant House (1:47.89); Trenton Julian (1:46.99); Zach Apple (1:46.16); Sean Grieshop^{[a]} Zachary Yeadon^{[a]}	7:09.77	Italy (ITA); Mattia Zuin (1:48.36); Matteo Ciampi (1:47.03); Alessio Proietti Colonna (1:48.72); Stefano Di Cola (1:46.32)	7:10.43	Australia (AUS); Maxwell Carleton (1:49.43); Ashton Brinkworth (1:48.21); Brendon Smith (1:49.18); Jacob Hansford (1:47.93); Cameron Tysoe^{[a]}	7:14.75
4 × 100 m medley relay	United States (USA); Justin Ress (53.31); Ian Finnerty (1:00.36); John Shebat (51.80); Zach Apple (47.55); Coleman Stewart^{[a]} Jonathan Tybur^{[a]} Jack Saunderson^{[a]} Tate Jackson^{[a]}	3:33.02	Russia (RUS); Grigoriy Tarasevich (53.94); Kirill Prigoda (59.14); Egor Kuimov (51.86); Ivan Kuzmenko (48.78); Mark Nikolaev^{[a]} Ilia Khomenko^{[a]} Aleksandr Sadovnikov^{[a]}	3:33.72	Brazil (BRA); Gabriel Fantoni (54.15); Pedro Cardona (1:00.98); Iago Moussalem (52.08); Marco Antônio Ferreira (48.12); Guilherme Basseto^{[a]} Felipe de Souza^{[a]}	3:33.72
AF African record | AM Americas record | AS Asian record | ER European record | OC Oceania record | UR Universiade record | WR World record | NR National record

^{a} Swimmers who participated in the heats only and received medals.

=== Women's events ===
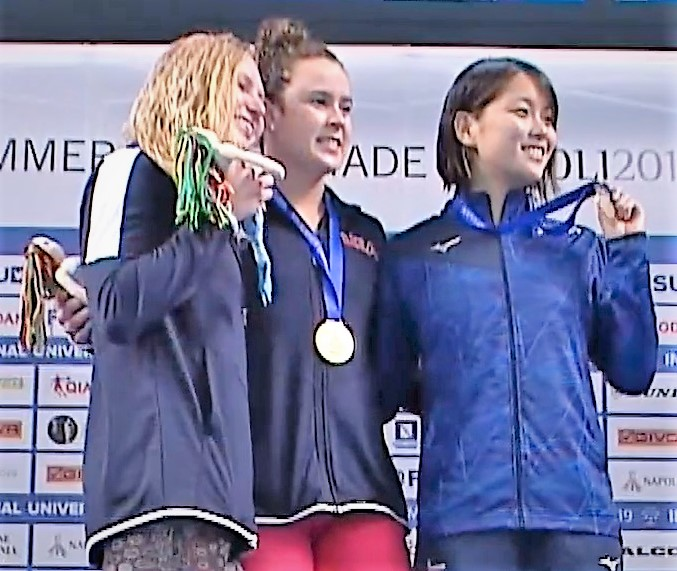
LtR: Olivia Carter, Dakota Luther, Sachi Mochida at 2019 Summer Universiade with their medals for the Women's 200m Butterfly

Event	Gold		Silver		Bronze	
50 m freestyle	Ky-lee Perry; United States	25.08	Jessica Felsner; Germany	25.12	Emily Barclay; Great Britain	25.15
100 m freestyle	Gabby DeLoof; United States	54.76	Lisa Höpink; Germany	55.04	Veronica Burchill; United States	55.05
200 m freestyle	Gabby DeLoof; United States	1:57.62	Paige Madden; United States	1:58.31	Mariya Baklakova; Russia	1:59.00
400 m freestyle	Kaersten Meitz; United States	4:05.80	Linda Caponi; Italy	4:10.53	Sierra Schmidt; United States	4:11.37
800 m freestyle	Waka Kobori; Japan	8:34.30	Irina Prikhodko; Russia	8:37.36	Chinatsu Sato; Japan	8:38.19
1500 m freestyle	Waka Kobori; Japan	16:16.33	Moesha Johnson; Australia	16:20.00	Molly Kowal; United States	16:20.94
50 m backstroke	Silvia Scalia; Italy	27.92	Elise Haan; United States	28.02	Calypso McDonnell; Australia	28.25
100 m backstroke	Katharine Berkoff; United States	59.29; UR	Elise Haan; United States	59.62	Silvia Scalia; Italy	1:00.43
200 m backstroke	Lisa Bratton; United States	2:07.91; UR	Asia Seidt; United States	2:08.56	Chloe Golding; Great Britain	2:09.57
50 m breaststroke	Jhennifer Alves; Brazil	30.73	Sarah Vasey; Great Britain	30.81	Chelsea Hodges; Australia	31.13
100 m breaststroke	Tatjana Schoenmaker; South Africa	1:06.42	Mai Fukasawa; Japan	1:07.22	Kanako Watanabe; Japan	1:07.28
200 m breaststroke	Tatjana Schoenmaker; South Africa	2:22.92	Emily Escobedo; United States	2:23.65	Kanako Watanabe; Japan	2:24.18
50 m butterfly	Tayla Lovemore; South Africa	26.25	Ai Soma; Japan	26.38	Jeong So-eun; South Korea	26.41
100 m butterfly	Tayla Lovemore; South Africa	58.74	Dakota Luther; United States	58.82	Lisa Höpink; Germany	58.87
200 m butterfly	Dakota Luther; United States	2:07.92	Olivia Carter; United States	2:09.05	Sachi Mochida; Japan	2:09.38
200 m individual medley	Alicia Wilson; Great Britain	2:11.35	Ella Eastin; United States	2:12.24	Runa Imai; Japan	2:12.25
400 m individual medley	Makayla Sargent; United States	4:37.95	Genevieve Pfeifer; United States	4:40.16	Ilaria Cusinato; Italy	4:40.18
4 × 100 m freestyle relay	United States (USA); Veronica Burchill (55.39); Claire Rasmus (54.63); Catherine DeLoof (54.10); Gabby DeLoof (53.87); Claire Adams^{[b]}	3:37.99; UR	Japan (JPN); Mayuka Yamamoto (56.15); Sachi Mochida (55.60); Kanako Watanabe (55.55); Runa Imai (54.44); Aki Nishizu^{[b]}	3:41.74	Italy (ITA); Paola Biagioli (55.75); Gioelemaria Origlia (55.72); Giulia Verona (55.52); Aglaia Pezzato (54.85)	3:41.84
4 × 200 m freestyle relay	United States (USA); Kaersten Meitz (1:58.23); Paige Madden (1:59.33); Claire Rasmus (1:58.81); Gabby DeLoof (1:57.53); Catherine DeLoof^{[b]} Sierra Schmidt^{[b]}	7:53.90	Italy (ITA); Linda Caponi (1:58.97); Paola Biagioli (2:00.48); Alice Scarabelli (1:58.83); Sara Ongaro (2:01.40); Gioelemaria Origlia^{[b]}	7:59.68	Russia (RUS); Mariya Baklakova (1:59.47); Irina Krivonogova (1:59.40); Irina Prikhodko (1:59.98); Elizaveta Klevanovich (2:05.00); Anastasiia Osipenko^{[b]} Vasilissa Buinaia^{[b]} Ksenia Vasilenok^{[b]} Aleksandra Denisenko^{[b]}	8:03.85
4 × 100 m medley relay	United States (USA); Katharine Berkoff (1:00.03); Emily Escobedo (1:06.72); Dakota Luther (59.01); Gabby DeLoof (54.01); Elise Haan^{[b]} Veronica Burchill^{[b]} Catherine DeLoof^{[b]}	3:59.77	Japan (JPN); Marina Furubayashi (1:00.97); Mai Fukasawa (1:07.01); Ai Soma (58.22); Runa Imai (53.87); Kanako Watanabe^{[b]}	4:00.07	Canada (CAN); Ingrid Wilm (1:01.04); Nina Kucheran (1:08.03); Hannah Genich (59.47); Ainsley McMurray (54.78); Sophie Angus^{[b]} Sarah Watson^{[b]}	4:03.32
AF African record | AM Americas record | AS Asian record | ER European record | OC Oceania record | UR Universiade record | WR World record | NR National record

^{b} Swimmers who participated in the heats only and received medals.
