= South Africa at the 2019 Summer Universiade =

- Flag of South Africa
- IOC code: RSA

in Naples, Italy 3 July 2019 – 14 July 2019
- Medals Ranked 10th: Gold 6 Silver 8 Bronze 4 Total 18

Summer Universiade appearances
- 1959; 1961; 1963; 1965; 1967; 1970; 1973; 1975; 1977; 1979; 1981; 1983; 1985; 1987; 1989; 1991; 1993; 1995; 1997; 1999; 2001; 2003; 2005; 2007; 2009; 2011; 2013; 2015; 2017; 2019; 2021; 2025; 2027

South Africa competed at the 2019 Summer Universiade in Naples, Italy held from 3 to 14 July 2019.

== Medal summary ==
=== Medal by sports ===
Medals by sport
Athletics	1	6	4	11
Swimming	5	1	0	6
Rugby sevens	0	1	0	1

=== Medalists ===
Medal	Name	Sport	Event	Date
Gold	Mokofane Kekana	Athletics	Men's 10,000 metres	July 9
Gold	Zane Waddell	Swimming	Men's 50 m backstroke	July 7
Gold	Tatjana Schoenmaker	Swimming	Women's 100 m breaststroke	July 6
Gold	Tatjana Schoenmaker	Swimming	Women's 200 m breaststroke	July 8
Gold	Tayla Lovemore	Swimming	Women's 50 m butterfly	July 5
Gold	Tayla Lovemore	Swimming	Women's 100 m butterfly	July 8
Silver	Men's team	Rugby sevens	Men's tournament	July 7
Silver	Chederick van Wyk	Athletics	Men's 100 metres	July 9
Silver	Chederick van Wyk	Athletics	Men's 200 metres	July 11
Silver	Michael Houlie	Swimming	Men's 50 m breaststroke	July 9
Silver	Zeney van der Walt	Athletics	Women's 400 metres hurdles	July 10
Silver	Sokwakhana Zazini	Athletics	Men's 400 metres hurdles	July 11
Silver	Rantso Mokopane	Athletics	Men's 3000 metres steeplechase	July 12
Silver	Gardeo Isaacs; Zakhithi Nene; Kefilwe Mogawane; Sokwakhana Zazini; Jon Seeliger	Athletics	Men's 4 × 400 metres relay	July 13
Bronze	Adriaan Wildschutt	Athletics	Men's 10,000 metres	July 9
Bronze	Gardeo Isaacs	Athletics	Men's 400 metres	July 10
Bronze	Ashley Smith	Athletics	Men's 3000 metres steeplechase	July 12
Bronze	Tyler Beling; Lesego Msphe; Rachel Leistra	Athletics	Women's half marathon team	July 13
