= Swimming at the 2023 Pan American Games – Women's 200 metre butterfly =

Women's 200 metre butterfly at the 2023 Pan American Games
- Venue: Aquatic Centre
- Date: October 21, 2023
- Competitors: 18 from 13 nations

Medalists
Gold medal	Dakota Luther	United States
Silver medal	María José Mata	Mexico
Bronze medal	Kelly Pash	United States

The women's 200 metre butterfly competition of the swimming events at the 2023 Pan American Games were held on October 21, 2023, at the Aquatic Center in Santiago, Chile.

== Records ==
Prior to this competition, the existing world and Pan American Games records were as follows:

World record	Zige Liu (CHN)	2:01.81	Shandong, China	October 21, 2009
Pan American Games record	Kathleen Hersey (USA)	2:07.64	Rio de Janeiro, Brazil	July 21, 2007

== Results ==
KEY:	QA	Qualified for A final	QB	Qualified for B final	GR	Games record	NR	National record	PB	Personal best	SB	Seasonal best	WD	Withdrew

=== Heats ===
The first round was held on October 21.

Rank	Heat	Lane	Name	Nationality	Time	Notes
1	2	4	Kelly Pash	United States	2:10.68	QA
2	3	4	Dakota Luther	United States	2:10.78	QA
3	1	4	María José Mata	Mexico	2:11.32	QA
4	2	5	Katie Forrester	Canada	2:!4.09	QA
5	3	5	Karen Durango	Colombia	2:14.39	QA
6	3	6	Laura Arroyo	Mexico	2:14.82	QA
7	1	3	Alondra Ortiz	Costa Rica	2:15.50	QA
8	1	6	Yasmín Silva	Peru	2:15.51	QA
9	2	6	Samantha Baños	Colombia	2:15.65	QB
10	1	5	Giovanna Diamante	Brazil	2:16.60	WD
11	3	3	Jade Foelske	Ecuador	2:18.47	QB
12	2	3	Maria Fernanda Costa	Brazil	2:18.84	WD
13	1	2	Monstserrat Spielmann	Chile	2:20.69	QB
14	2	7	Sierrah Broadbelt	Cayman Islands	2:20.90	QB
15	2	2	Michell Ramírez	Honduras	2:22.68	QB
16	3	2	Luana Alonso	Paraguay	2:24.24	QB
17	3	7	Fatima Portillo	El Salvador	2:28.44	QB
18	1	7	Arantza Salazar	Chile	2:29.99	QB

=== Final B ===
The B final was held on October 21.

Rank	Lane	Name	Nationality	Time	Notes
9	4	Samantha Baños	Colombia	2:15.24	
10	5	Jade Foelske	Ecuador	2:16.77	
11	6	Sierrah Broadbelt	Cayman Islands	2:20.10	
12	3	Monstserrat Spielmann	Chile	2:20.49	
13	1	Fatima Portillo	El Salvador	2:22.28	NR
14	2	Michell Ramírez	Honduras	2:22.42	
15	7	Luana Alonso	Paraguay	2:23.79	
16	8	Arantza Salazar	Chile	2:28.71	

=== Final A ===
The A final was held on October 21.

Rank	Lane	Name	Nationality	Time	Notes
1st place, gold medalist(s)	5	Dakota Luther	United States	2:09.97	
2nd place, silver medalist(s)	3	María José Mata	Mexico	2:10.25	
3rd place, bronze medalist(s)	4	Kelly Pash	United States	2:10.30	
4	6	Katie Forrester	Canada	2:12.90	
5	2	Karen Durango	Colombia	2:15.18	
6	1	Alondra Ortiz	Costa Rica	2:15.18	
7	8	Yasmín Silva	Peru	2:15.90	
8	7	Laura Arroyo	Mexico	2:16.31	
