= Swimming at the 2023 Pan American Games – Women's 4 × 100 metre medley relay =

Women's 4 × 100 metre medley relay at the 2023 Pan American Games
- Venue: Aquatic Centre
- Date: October 25
- Competitors: 85 from 15 nations

Medalists
Gold medal	Danielle Hanus; Rachel Nicol; Maggie MacNeil; Mary-Sophie Harvey; Madelyn Gatrall; Sophie Angus; Katerine Savard; Brooklyn Douthwright	Canada
Silver medal	Josephine Fuller; Emma Webber; Kelly Pash; Catie Deloof; Reilly Tiltmann; Anna Keating; Olivia Bray; Gabi Albiero	United States
Bronze medal	Miranda Grana; Melissa Rodríguez; María José Mata; Sofía Revilak; Andrea Sansores; Fernanda Jimenez; Miriam Guevara; Athena Meneses	Mexico

The women's 4 × 100 metre medley relay competition of the swimming events at the 2023 Pan American Games were held on October 25, 2023, at the Aquatic Center in Santiago, Chile.

== Records ==
Prior to this competition, the existing world and Pan American Games records were as follows:

World record	Regan Smith (57.57); Lilly King (1:04.81); Kelsi Dahlia (56.16); Simone Manuel (51.86) (USA)	3:50.40	Gwangju, South Korea	July 28 2019
Pan American Games record	Natalie Coughlin (59.05); Katie Meili (1:06.06); Kelsi Worrell (57.34); Allison Schmitt (54.08) (USA)	3:56.53	Toronto, Canada	July 18, 2015

== Results ==
KEY:	QA	Qualified for A final	QB	Qualified for B final	GR	Games record	NR	National record	PB	Personal best	SB	Seasonal best

=== Heats ===
The highest eight scores advance to the final.

Rank	Heat	Lane	Name	Nationality	Time	Notes
1	1	4	Madelyn Gatrall (1:02.11); Sophie Angus (1:06.77); Katerine Savard (1:09.49); Brooklyn Douthwright (46.82)	Canada	4:05.19	Q
2	2	4	Reilly Tiltmann (1:01.80); Anna Keating (1:10.82); Olivia Bray (59.21); Gabi Albiero (54.60)	United States	4:06.43	Q
3	2	6	Isabella Arcila (1:02.68); Stefanía Gómez (1:09.54); Valentina Becerra; Karen Durango	Colombia	4:10.54	Q
4	2	5	Julia Góes (1:04.71); Nichelly Lysy (1:11.28); Giovanna Diamante (1:01.17); Ana Carolina Vieira (54.22)	Brazil	4:11.38	Q
5	1	5	Andrea Sansores (1:02.40); Fernanda Jimenez (1:12.03); Miriam Guevara; Athena Meneses	Mexico	4:13.11	Q
6	1	3	Carla González (1:03.04); Mercedes Toledo (1:10.16); María Yegres (1:02.46); Lismar Lyon (57.99)	Venezuela	4:13.65	Q
7	2	3	Candela Raviola (1:05.06); Martina Barbeito (1:10.22); Macarena Ceballos (1:02.05); Guillermina Ruggiero (56.64)	Argentina	4:13.97	Q
8	1	6	Laurent Estrada (1:03.89); Daysi Ramírez (1:13.93); Lorena González (1:04.44); Elisbet Gámez (56.31)	Cuba	4:18.57	Q
9	2	7	Sarah Szklaruk (1:05.52); Antonia Cubillos (1:13.83); Monstserrat Spielmann (1:02.52); Inés Marín (56.94)	Chile	4:18.81	R
10	2	2	Abril Aunchayna (1:05.36); Nicole Frank (1:12.53); María Solari (1:06.45); Luna Chabat (58.03)	Uruguay	4:22.37	R
11	1	7	Leanna Wainwright (1:07.03); Sabrina Lyn (1:13.99); Morgan Cogle (1:08.44); Emily MacDonald (58.20)	Jamaica	4:27.66	
12	2	1	Melissa Diego (1:05.58); Nicole Mack (1:18.12); María Morales (1:06.88); María Santis (1:00.74)	Independent Athletes Team	4:31.32	
13	1	1	Zaylie Thompson (1:09.78); Victoria Russell (1:17.91); Katelyn Cabral (1:05.44); Ariel Weech (1:00.90)	Bahamas	4:34.03	
	1	2		Peru	DNS	

=== Final ===
The final was held on October 25.

Rank	Lane	Name	Nationality	Time	Notes
1st place, gold medalist(s)	4	Danielle Hanus (1:00.97); Rachel Nicol (1:07.14); Maggie MacNeil (56.83); Mary-Sophie Harvey (53.82)	Canada	3:58.76	
2nd place, silver medalist(s)	5	Josephine Fuller (1:00.47); Emma Webber (1:07.39); Kelly Pash (57.62); Catie Deloof (53.91)	United States	3:59.39	
3rd place, bronze medalist(s)	2	Miranda Grana (1:01.86); Melissa Rodríguez (1:07.44); María José Mata (59.40); Sofía Revilak (56.03)	Mexico	4:04.73	
4	3	Isabella Arcila (1:02.15); Stefanía Gómez (1:08.45); Valentina Becerra (58.63); Sirena Rowe (55.56)	Colombia	4:04.79	NR
5	6	Maria Luiza Pessanha (1:02.88); Jhennifer Conceição (1:08.52); Clarissa Rodriguez (59.85); Stephanie Balduccini (53.70)	Brazil	4:04.95	
6	1	Andrea Berrino (1:01.88); Macarena Ceballos (1:07.80); Agostina Hein; Lucía Gauna	Argentina	4:07.70	
7	7	Carla González (1:02.68); Mercedes Toledo (1:09.32); Lismar Lyon (1:01.02); María Yegres (58.13)	Venezuela	4:11.15	
8	8	Laurent Estrada (1:04.02); Daysi Ramírez (1:13.22); Lorena González (1:03.66); Elisbet Gámez (55.69)	Cuba	4:16.59	
