= Iliass Aouani =

Italian middle-distance runner

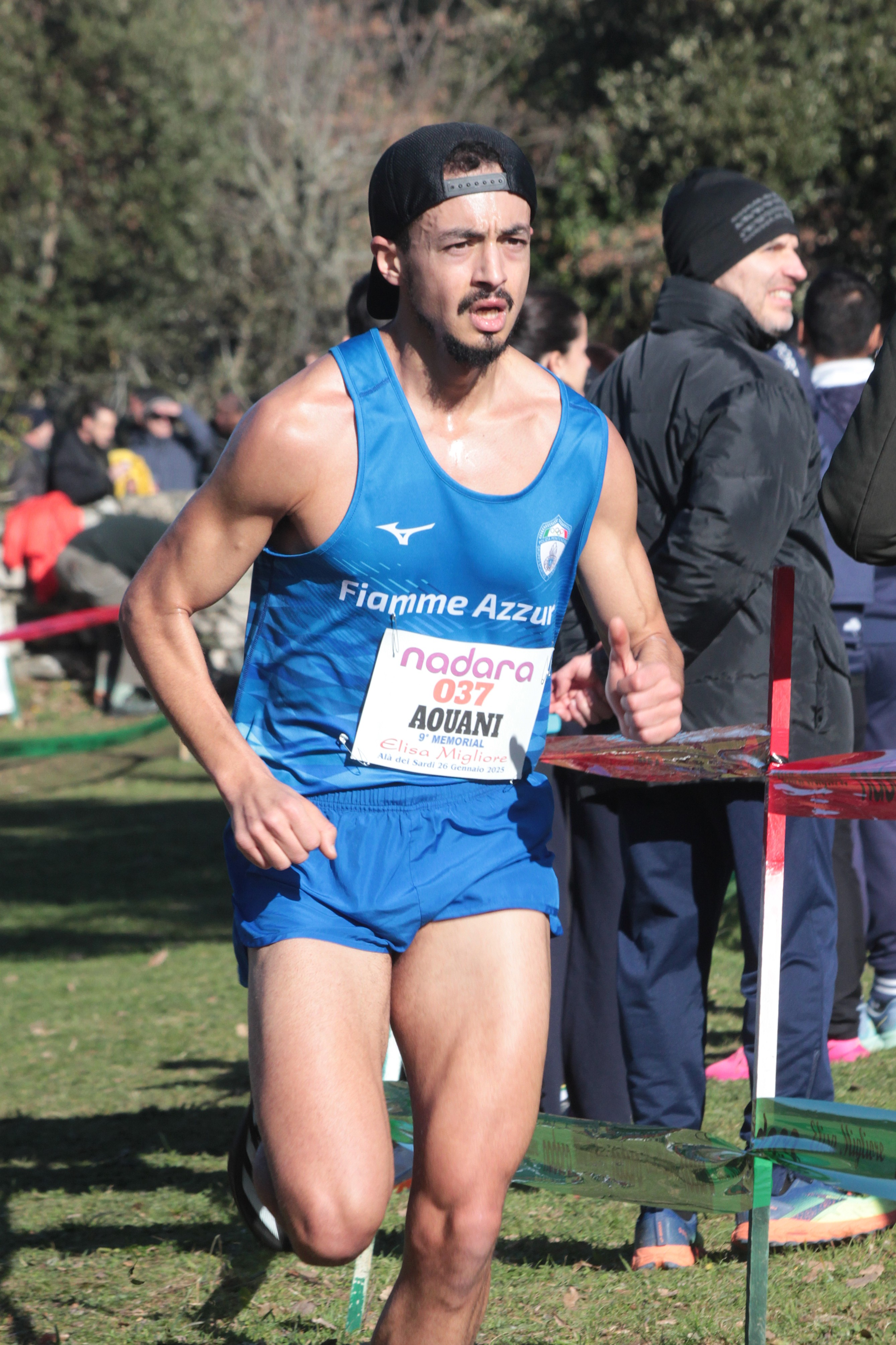
- Aouani in a cross country race

Personal information
- National team: Italy
- Born: 29 September 1995 (age 31) Fquih Ben Salah, Morocco

Sport
- Sport: Athletics
- Events: Middle-distance running Long-distance running
- College team: Syracuse Orange
- Club: Atletica Riccardi

Achievements and titles
- Personal bests: 800 m: 1:56.08 (2013); 1500 m: 3:45.61 (2019); 3000 m: 8:03.49 (2019); 5000 m: 13:28.09 (2021); 10,000 m: 27:45.81 (2021); Half Marathon: 1:01:32 (2024); Marathon: 2:04:26 (2026) NR
Medal record
Men's athletics
Representing Italy
World Championships
Bronze medal – third place	2025 Tokyo	Marathon
European Running Championships
Gold medal – first place	2025 Brussels‑Leuven	Marathon

Iliass Aouani (born 29 September 1995) is an Italian middle and long-distance runner who set a new Italian national marathon record of 2:04:26 at the 2026 Tokyo Marathon.

== Life and career ==
Born in Fquih Ben Salah, Morocco, Aouani moved to Italy when he was 2, and grew up in the Province of Milan between Sesto San Giovanni and Ponte Lambro. He started running when he was 16, and in 2014, under the guidance of the former coach of Gennaro Di Napoli Claudio Valisa, he got the national junior 5000 metres title. He studied at Lamar University and later at Syracuse University, earning a bachelor's degree in civil engineering and a master's degree in structural engineering.

In 2021, Aouani moved to Ferrara to focus on his athletic career, training under Massimo Magnani; the same year, he won 4 national titles. In 2024, he achieved the second-fastest Italian time ever at the Valencia Marathon. In 2025, he won the gold in the men's marathon at the European Running Championships, and the bronze in the same discipline at the World Athletics Championships, 22 years after the latest Italian medallist Stefano Baldini.

== Achievements ==
Year	Competition	Venue	Rank	Event	Time	Notes
2019	Universiade	(Italy) Naples	4th	10,000 m	29:41.97	
2019	Universiade	(Italy) Naples	5th	Half marathon	1:06:52	SB
2021	European 10,000m Cup	(United Kingdom) Birmingham	29th	10,000 m	29:24.42	

== National titles ==
Aouani won five national championships at individual senior level.

- Italian Athletics Championships
  - 10,000 m: 2021
  - Half marathon: 2021
- Italian Cross Country Championships
  - Long course: 2021, 2022
- Italian 10 km road Championship
  - 10 km road: 2021
