= Pedro Cardona =

Brazilian swimmer

Personal information
- Full name: Pedro Henrique Brasil Cardona
- Nationality: Brazil
- Born: August 15, 1995 (age 30) São Paulo, São Paulo, Brazil
- Height: 1.79 kg
- Weight: 64 kg (141 lb)

Sport
- Sport: Swimming
- Strokes: Breaststroke
- Club: Esporte Clube Pinheiros
Medal record
Representing Brazil
Summer Universiade
Bronze medal – third place	2019 Naples	4x100m medley relay

Pedro Henrique Brasil Cardona (born August 15, 1995 in São Paulo) is a Brazilian swimmer.
