= Athletics at the 2019 Summer Universiade – Women's pole vault =

The women's pole vault event at the 2019 Summer Universiade was held on 9 and 11 July at the Stadio San Paolo in Naples.

== Medalists ==
Gold	Silver	Bronze
Roberta Bruni; Italy	Rachel Baxter; United States	Bridget Guy; United States

== Results ==
=== Qualification ===
Qualification: 4.35 m (Q) or at least 12 best (q) qualified for the final.

Rank	Group	Name	Nationality	3.30	3.45	3.60	3.75	3.90	4.00	4.10	Result	Notes
1	A	Juliana Campos	Brazil	–	–	–	–	–	o	o	4.10	q
1	A	Sonia Malavisi	Italy	–	–	–	–	–	–	o	4.10	q
1	B	Roberta Bruni	Italy	–	–	–	–	–	–	o	4.10	q
4	A	Imogen Ayris	New Zealand	–	–	–	–	xo	xo	o	4.10	q
5	A	Lea Bachmann	Switzerland	–	–	–	–	–	–	xo	4.10	q
6	A	Mallaury Sautereau	France	–	–	–	–	–	o	–	4.00	q
6	B	Buse Arıkazan	Turkey	–	–	–	–	–	o	x	4.00	q
8	B	Olivia McTaggart	New Zealand	–	–	–	–	xo	o	x	4.00	q
9	B	Charlotte Gaudy	France	–	–	–	–	o	xo	–	4.00	q
9	B	Rachel Baxter	United States	–	–	–	–	o	xo	x	4.00	q
11	A	Bridget Guy	United States	–	–	–	–	xxo	xo	x	4.00	q
12	B	Rachel Wolfs	Canada	–	–	–	xo	o	xxx		3.90	q
13	B	Shen Yi-ju	Chinese Taipei	–	–	–	o	xxo	xxx		3.90	
14	A	Getter Lemberg	Estonia	–	–	xo	o	xxx			3.75	
14	A	Wu Chia-ju	Chinese Taipei	–	–	xo	o	xxx			3.75	
16	A	Shin Soo-young	South Korea	–	–	o	xxo	xxx			3.75	
17	B	Hanna Jansson	Sweden	–	–	o	xxx				3.60	
18	A	Anne Sofie Olsen	Denmark	xxo	o	o	xxx				3.60	PB
19	A	Annika Jonsson	Sweden	o	o	xo	xxx				3.60	
19	B	Caroline Ranners	Denmark	–	o	xo	xxx				3.60	
19	B	Leda Krošelj	Slovenia	o	o	xo	xxx				3.60	
22	A	Mariya Jaison	India	–	xxo	xxx					3.45	
	A	Makiah Hunt	Canada	–	–	xxx					NM	
	B	Marleen Mulla	Estonia	–	–	xxx					NM	
	B	Stine Grong Ruud	Norway	xxx							NM	

=== Final ===
Official Video

Rank	Name	Nationality	3.81	3.91	4.01	4.11	4.21	4.31	4.41	4.46	4.56	Result	Notes
1st place, gold medalist(s)	Roberta Bruni	Italy	–	–	–	xo	xo	xo	o	xxo	xxx	4.46	SB
2nd place, silver medalist(s)	Rachel Baxter	United States	–	o	o	o	xo	o	o	xxx		4.41	
3rd place, bronze medalist(s)	Bridget Guy	United States	–	–	–	o	o	xo	xxx			4.31	
4	Olivia McTaggart	New Zealand	–	–	o	xo	o	xo	xxx			4.31	
5	Juliana Campos	Brazil	–	–	o	o	xxo	xo	xxx			4.31	
6	Buse Arıkazan	Turkey	–	–	o	–	o	xxo	xxx			4.31	
7	Sonia Malavisi	Italy	–	–	–	o	xo	xxo	xxx			4.31	
8	Mallaury Sautereau	France	–	–	–	xo	xo	xxo	xxx			4.31	
9	Lea Bachmann	Switzerland	–	–	–	o	o	xxx				4.21	
10	Charlotte Gaudy	France	–	–	o	o	xxx					4.11	
11	Imogen Ayris	New Zealand	–	o	o	o	xxx					4.11	
12	Rachel Wolfs	Canada	o	o	xxx							3.91	
