= Athletics at the 2023 Pan American Games – Women's pole vault =

Women's pole vault at the 2023 Pan American Games
- Venue: Julio Martínez National Stadium
- Dates: November 2
- Competitors: 12 from 8 nations
- Winning height: 4.55

Medalists
Gold medal	Bridget Williams	United States
Silver medal	Robeilys Peinado	Venezuela
Bronze medal	Aslin Quiala	Cuba

The women's pole vault competition of the athletics events at the 2023 Pan American Games took place on November 2 at the Julio Martínez National Stadium.

== Records ==
Prior to this competition, the existing world and Pan American Games records were as follows:

World record	Elena Isinbaeva (RUS)	5.06	Zürich, Switzerland	August 28, 2009
Pan American Games record	Yarisley Silva (CUB)	4.85	Toronto, Canada	July 23, 2015

== Schedule ==
Date	Time	Round
November 2, 2023	17:30	Final

== Results ==
All times shown are in meters.

KEY:	q	Fastest non-qualifiers	Q	Qualified	NR	National record	PB	Personal best	SB	Seasonal best	DQ	Disqualified

=== Final ===
The results were as follows:

Rank	Name	Nationality	3.80	4.00	4.10	4.20	4.30	4.35	4.40	4.45	4.50	4.55	4.60	4.65	Mark	Notes
1st place, gold medalist(s)	Bridget Williams	United States	–	–	–	o	o	–	xo	o	xxo	x––	o	xxx	4.60	
2nd place, silver medalist(s)	Robeilys Peinado	Venezuela	–	–	xo	–	o	–	xo	–	o	xo	xx–	x	4.55	
3rd place, bronze medalist(s)	Aslin Quiala	Cuba	–	–	xo	o	xxo	o	o	xxx					4.40	
4	Juliana Campos	Brazil	–	–	o	o	–	xo	–	xxx					4.35	
5	Rachel Hyink	Canada	–	o	o	o	xxx								4.20	
6	Katherine Castillo	Colombia	–	xo	xxo	o	xxx								4.20	
7	Nastassja Campbell	United States	–	–	xo	xxx									4.10	
8	Viviana Quintana	Puerto Rico	–	o	xxx										4.00	
9	Isabel Demarco	Brazil	xo	o	xxx										4.00	
10	Beatriz Chagas	Brazil	xo	xxx											3.80	
	Alisandra Negrete	Mexico	–	xxx											NH	
	Rosaidi Robles	Cuba													DNS	
