= 2021 FINA World Swimming Championships (25 m) – Women's 200 metre breaststroke =

Swimming competition

Women's 200 metre breaststroke at the 2021 FINA World Swimming Championships (25 m)
- Venue: Etihad Arena
- Location: Abu Dhabi, United Arab Emirates
- Dates: 21 December (heats and final)
- Competitors: 34 from 30 nations
- Winning time: 2:17.85

Medalists
gold medal	Emily Escobedo	United States
silver medal	Evgeniia Chikunova
bronze medal	Molly Renshaw	Great Britain

The Women's 200 metre breaststroke competition of the 2021 FINA World Swimming Championships (25 m) was held on 21 December 2021.

== Records ==
Prior to the competition, the existing world and championship records were as follows.

World record	Rebecca Soni (USA)	2:14.57	Manchester, Great Britain	18 December 2009
Competition record	Rikke Møller Pedersen (DEN)	2:16.08	Istanbul, Turkey	16 December 2012

== Results ==
=== Heats ===
The heats were started at 09:52.

Rank	Heat	Lane	Name	Nationality	Time	Notes
1	3	4	Evgeniia Chikunova	Russian Swimming Federation	2:19.56	Q
2	3	6	Sophie Hansson	Sweden	2:20.31	Q
3	2	4	Molly Renshaw	Great Britain	2:20.33	Q
4	2	5	Francesca Fangio	Italy	2:20.53	Q
5	4	4	Emily Escobedo	United States	2:21.30	Q
6	4	2	Tessa Cieplucha	Canada	2:21.35	Q
7	3	9	Mona McSharry	Ireland	2:21.59	Q, NR
7	4	3	Kristýna Horská	Czech Republic	2:21.59	Q
9	4	5	Maria Temnikova	Russian Swimming Federation	2:21.88	
10	3	2	Emelie Fast	Sweden	2:22.02	
11	2	3	Kotryna Teterevkova	Lithuania	2:22.11	
12	2	0	Tang Qianting	China	2:22.15	
13	4	9	Melanie Margalis	United States	2:22.57	
14	2	7	Niamh Coyne	Ireland	2:23.03	
15	2	8	Eszter Békési	Hungary	2:23.06	
16	2	6	Lisa Mamie	Switzerland	2:23.38	
17	3	5	Anastasia Gorbenko	Israel	2:23.44	
18	3	0	Martina Barbeito	Argentina	2:24.70	
19	2	9	Justine Delmas	France	2:25.06	
20	3	8	Lena Kreundl	Austria	2:25.22	
21	4	0	Ana Blažević	Croatia	2:25.30	
22	2	2	Eneli Jefimova	Estonia	2:25.32	
23	4	7	Pamela Alencar	Brazil	2:25.98	
24	4	6	Tjasa Vozel	Slovenia	2:26.02	
25	1	4	Melissa Rodríguez	Mexico	2:26.22	
26	1	5	Anastasia Basisto	Moldova	2:26.41	NR
27	2	1	Back Su-yeon	South Korea	2:26.46	
28	4	8	Victoria Kaminskaya	Portugal	2:27.89	
29	1	3	Phiangkhwan Pawapotako	Thailand	2:28.19	
30	3	7	Laura Lahtinen	Finland	2:28.20	
31	1	2	Nàdia Tudó	Andorra	2:30.40	
32	1	6	Lam Hoi Kiu	Hong Kong	2:31.43	
33	1	7	Krista Jurado	Guatemala	2:36.40	NR
34	1	8	Tessa Ip Hen Cheung	Mauritius	2:43.81	
	1	1	Emilie Grand'Pierre	Haiti	DNS	
	3	1	Andrea Podmaníková	Slovakia	DNS	
	3	3	Jessica Vall	Spain	DNS	
	4	1	Nikoleta Trníková	Slovakia	DNS	

=== Final ===
The final was held at 18:41.

Rank	Lane	Name	Nationality	Time	Notes
1st place, gold medalist(s)	2	Emily Escobedo	United States	2:17.85	
2nd place, silver medalist(s)	4	Evgeniia Chikunova	Russian Swimming Federation	2:17.88	
3rd place, bronze medalist(s)	3	Molly Renshaw	Great Britain	2:17.96	
4	5	Sophie Hansson	Sweden	2:18.13	NR
5	6	Francesca Fangio	Italy	2:19.77	
6	7	Tessa Cieplucha	Canada	2:19.99	
7	1	Mona McSharry	Ireland	2:20.19	NR
8	8	Kristýna Horská	Czech Republic	2:20.70	
