= Juliana Campos =

Brazilian pole vaulter (born 1996)

Personal information
- Full name: Juliana de Menis Campos
- Born: 17 October 1996 (age 29) São Caetano do Sul, SP

Sport
- Sport: Athletics
- Event: Pole vault
- Club: Orcampi Unimed-SP

Juliana de Menis Campos (born 17 October 1996) is a Brazilian olympic athlete specialising in the pole vault. She has won multiple medals at regional level.

She participated in her first world championships in Budapest 2023, where she made the 4.50m mark. Unable to have her own poles, the Brazilian borrowed material from Fabiana Murer, a former athlete and world champion in the sport.

Campos put Brazil back in the women's pole vault final at the World Championships after ten years. She had a perfect performance in the 2025 World Championship qualification, landing three vaults and placing first with a mark of 4.60m.

== Personal bests ==
Event	Height (m)	Location	Date
Pole vault, indoor	4.41	Osijek, Croatia	20 February 2024
Pole vault, outdoor	4.76	Schlanders, Italy	18 July 2025

- All information taken from IAAF Profile.

== International competitions ==
Year	Competition	Venue	Position	Notes
Representing Brazil
2012	South American Youth Championships	Mendoza, Argentina	3rd	3.45 m
2013	World Youth Championships	Donetsk, Ukraine	19th (q)	3.55 m
2013	South American Junior Championships	Resistencia, Argentina	3rd	3.60 m
2014	South American U23 Championships	Montevideo, Uruguay	2nd	3.70 m
2015	South American Junior Championships	Cuenca, Ecuador	3rd	3.90 m
2015	Pan American Junior Championships	Edmonton, Canada	3rd	4.00 m
2016	South American U23 Championships	Lima, Peru	1st	3.90 m
2018	South American Games	Cochabamba, Bolivia	2nd	4.20 m
2018	Ibero-American Championships	Trujillo, Peru	1st	4.40 m
2018	South American U23 Championships	Cuenca, Ecuador	1st	4.40 m
2019	South American Championships	Lima, Peru	3rd	3.91 m
2019	Universiade	Naples, Italy	5th	4.31 m
2019	Pan American Games	Lima, Peru	8th	4.10 m
2020	South American Indoor Championships	Cochabamba, Bolivia	2nd	3.80 m
2021	South American Championships	Guayaquil, Ecuador	8th	3.70 m
2022	South American Indoor Championships	Cochabamba, Bolivia	3rd	3.80 m
2022	Ibero-American Championships	La Nucía, Spain	2nd	4.30 m
2022	South American Games	Asunción, Paraguay	2nd	4.20 m
2023	South American Championships	São Paulo, Brazil	1st	4.60 m
2023	World Championships	Budapest, Hungary	22nd (q)	4.50 m
2023	Pan American Games	Santiago, Chile	4th	4.35 m
2024	Olympic Games	Paris, France	21st (q)	4.40 m
2025	South American Championships	Mar del Plata, Argentina	1st	4.30 m
2025	World Championships	Tokyo, Japan	1st (q)	4.60 m^{1}
2026	World Indoor Championships	Toruń, Poland	7th	4.70 m
2026	Pan American Championships	Medellín, Colombia	1st	4.45 m
2026	South American Games	Santa Fe, Argentina	1st	4.40 m

^{1}No mark in the final
