= Swimming at the 2023 Pan American Games – Women's 100 metre freestyle =

Women's 100 metre freestyle at the 2023 Pan American Games
- Venue: Aquatic Centre
- Date: October 23, 2023
- Competitors: 39 from 29 nations

Medalists
Gold medal	Maggie MacNeil	Canada
Silver medal	Stephanie Balduccini	Brazil
Bronze medal	Catie De Loof	United States

The women's 100 metre freestyle competition of the swimming events at the 2023 Pan American Games were held on October 24, 2023, at the Aquatic Center in Santiago, Chile.

== Records ==
Prior to this competition, the existing world and Pan American Games records were as follows:

World record	Haiyang Qin (CHN)	51.71	Budapest, Hungary	July 23, 2017
Pan American Games record	Arianna Vanderpoo-Wallace (BAH)	53.83	Toronto, Canada	July 14, 2015

== Results ==
KEY:	QA	Qualified for A final	QB	Qualified for B final	GR	Games record	NR	National record	PB	Personal best	SB	Seasonal best

=== Heats ===
The first round was held on October 24.

Rank	Heat	Lane	Name	Nationality	Time	Notes
1	5	5	Amy Fulmer	United States	54.78	QA
2	4	5	Ana Vieira	Brazil	54.89	QA
3	3	4	Stephanie Balduccini	Brazil	54.96	QA
4	5	4	Catie De Loof	United States	55.52	QA
5	4	2	Anicka Delgado	Ecuador	55.73	QA
6	4	4	Maggie MacNeil	Canada	55.76	QA
7	3	5	Mary-Sophie Harvey	Canada	55.77	QA
8	5	7	Andrea Becali	Cuba	56.28	QA
9	5	1	Sofía Revilak	Mexico	56.49	QB
10	5	3	Elisbet Gámez	Cuba	56.26	QB
11	3	2	Marina Spadoni	El Salvador	57.13	QB
12	4	3	Celine Bispo	Brazil	57.15	QB
13	3	3	Karen Durango	Colombia	57.42	QB
14	5	2	Athena Meneses	Mexico	57.44	QB
15	4	1	Inés Marín	Chile	57.45	QB
16	4	7	María Yegres	Venezuela	57.57	WD
17	3	7	Rafaela Fernandini	Peru	57.61	QB
18	4	8	Elisabeth Timmer	Aruba	57.86	
19	4	6	Lucía Gauna	Argentina	57.89	
20	2	6	Sabrina Lyn	Jamaica	57.99	
21	3	6	Guillermina Ruggiero	Argentina	58.08	
22	5	6	Isabella Bedoya	Colombia	58.16	
22	2	4	Luna María Chabat	Uruguay	58.16	
24	3	1	Madelyn Moore	Bermuda	58.37	
25	2	5	Julimar Ávila	Honduras	58.56	
26	5	8	Beatriz Padrón	Costa Rica	58.67	
27	3	8	María Schutzmeier	Nicaragua	58.78	
28	2	7	Monstserrat Spielmann	Chile	59.08	
29	2	1	Zaylie Thompson	Bahamas	59.34	
30	2	3	María Santis	Independent Athletes Team	59.36	
31	2	2	María Castillo	Panama	59.39	
32	2	8	Kyra Rabess	Cayman Islands	59.81	
33	1	4	Tilly Collymore	Grenada	59.87	
34	1	6	Aleka Persaud	Guyana	1:00.96	
35	1	3	Stefania Piccardo	Paraguay	1:01.31	
36	1	7	Natalia Kuipers	Virgin Islands	1:01.89	
37	1	5	Harper Barrowman	Cayman Islands	1:02.28	
38	1	2	Kennice Greene	Saint Vincent and the Grenadines	1:02.41	
39	1	1	Kaeylin Djoparto	Suriname	1:08.74	

=== Final B ===
The B final was held on October 23.

Rank	Lane	Name	Nationality	Time	Notes
9	5	Elisbet Gámez	Cuba	56.48	
10	3	Marina Spadoni	El Salvador	56.72	NR
11	1	Inés Marín	Chile	57.03	
12	4	Sofía Revilak	Mexico	57.31	
13	8	Rafaela Fernandini	Peru	57.34	
14	2	Karen Durango	Colombia	57.75	
14	7	Athena Meneses	Mexico	57.75	
16	6	Celine Bispo	Brazil	57.82	

=== Final A ===
The A final was held on October 23.

Rank	Lane	Name	Nationality	Time	Notes
1st place, gold medalist(s)	7	Maggie MacNeil	Canada	53.64	GR
2nd place, silver medalist(s)	3	Stephanie Balduccini	Brazil	54.13	
3rd place, bronze medalist(s)	6	Catie De Loof	United States	54.50	
4	1	Mary-Sophie Harvey	Canada	54.64	
5	4	Amy Fulmer	United States	54.90	
6	5	Ana Vieira	Brazil	55.07	
7	2	Anicka Delgado	Ecuador	55.95	
8	8	Andrea Becali	Cuba	56.12	
