= Athletics at the 2019 Summer Universiade – Men's 10,000 metres =

The men's 10,000 metres event at the 2019 Summer Universiade was held on 9 July at the Stadio San Paolo in Naples.

== Results ==
Rank	Name	Nationality	Time	Notes
1st place, gold medalist(s)	Mokofane Kekana	South Africa	29:29.43	
2nd place, silver medalist(s)	Hiroki Abe	Japan	29:30.01	
3rd place, bronze medalist(s)	Adriaan Wildschutt	South Africa	29:36.39	
4	Iliass Aouani	Italy	29:41.97	
5	Farah Abdulkarim	Canada	29:43.51	
6	Ashenafi Tadesse	Ethiopia	29:47.83	PB
7	Wang Hao	China	30:08.59	
8	Kazuya Nishiyama	Japan	30:10.65	
9	Benjamin Preisner	Canada	30:27.37	
10	Riley Cocks	Australia	30:36.67	
11	Frederik Ernst	Denmark	30:52.23	
12	Dieter Kersten	Belgium	30:53.15	
13	Lachlan Cook	Australia	30:56.66	
14	Bipin Kumar Patel	India	31:33.09	
15	Bernardo Maldonado	Argentina	31:48.53	
16	Gonzalo Parra	Mexico	31:51.92	
	Xie Chao	China	DNF	
	Eero Saleva	Finland	DNF	
	Moses Mithi Longwe	Malawi	DNF	
	Manuel de Backer	Netherlands	DNF	
	Brian Wangwe	Uganda	DNF	

Official Video
