= Dakota Luther =

American swimmer (born 1999)

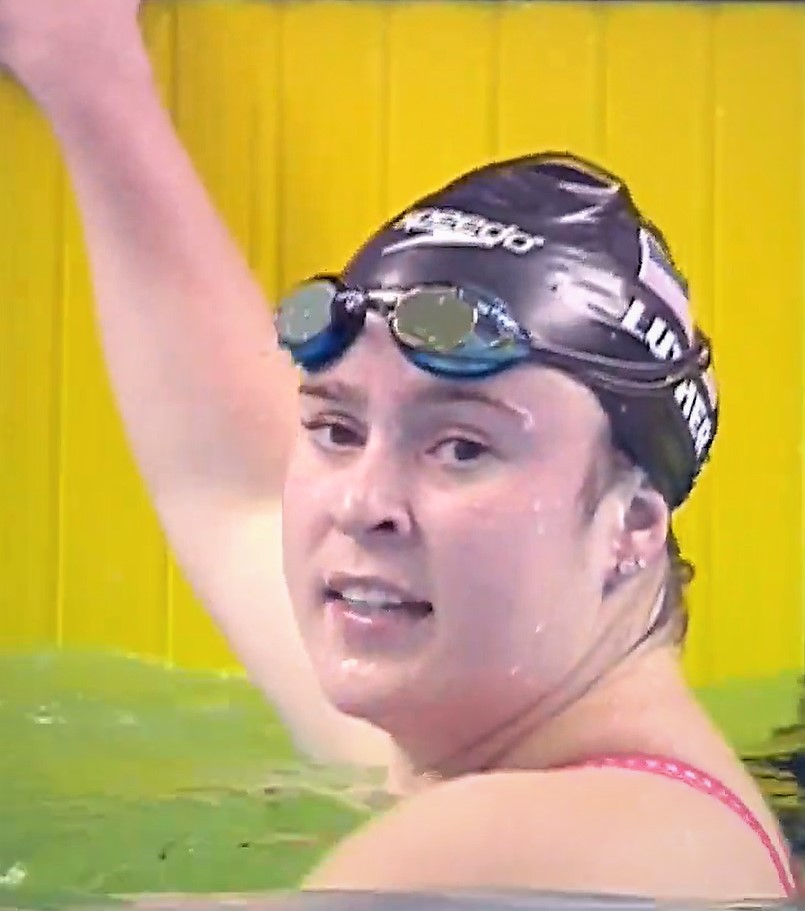
- Luther after winning the 2019 Summer Universiade 200 metre event

Personal information
- Nationality: American
- Born: November 7, 1999 (age 27)
- Height: 5 ft 5 in (165.1 cm)
- Relatives: Whitney Hedgepeth, (Mother)

Sport
- Sport: Swimming
- Strokes: Butterfly
- Club: Austin Swim Club
- College team: University of Georgia (2018–22); University Texas at Austin (2022–23)
- Coach: Brendan Hansen (Austin Swim Club); Jack Bauerle (U. Georgia); Carol Capitani (U. Texas)
Medal record
Women's swimming
Representing the United States
World Championships (SC)
Gold medal – first place	2022 Melbourne	200 m butterfly
World University Games
Gold medal – first place	2019 Naples	200 m butterfly
Gold medal – first place	2019 Naples	4×100 m medley
Silver medal – second place	2019 Naples	100 m butterfly
Pan American Games
Gold medal – first place	2023 Santiago	200 m butterfly

Dakota Luther (born November 7, 1999) is an American swimmer who competed for the University of Georgia and the University of Texas between 208-2023. She competed in the women's 200 metre butterfly event at the 2017 World Aquatics Championships where she placed 15th. In international competition at the 2022 FINA World Swimming Championships, in Melbourne, Australia, she won a gold medal in the women's 200 meter butterfly.

Dakota Luther was born November 7, 1999, likely in greater Austin to father Mark Luther and Whitney Hedgepeth. Growing up in Austin, she attended Austin Westlake High School and competed for the Austin Swim Club where she was trained and managed by Brendan Hansen an Olympic breaststroker, skill in stroke technique. Her mother Whitney Hedgepeth, was an Olympic gold medalist at the 1996 Atlanta Games.

== College ==
She swam for the University of Georgia from 2018-2022, where she was coached by Jack Bauerle, who began coaching the women's team in 1979 and retired as coach in 2022. Bauerle coached both the men's and women's teams at Georgia from 2018-2022. At Georgia, Luther earned All-American honors by the College Swimming Coaching Association in the 200 Butterfly, and was a Second Team All-American in the 200 medley relay, 100 Butterfly, and the 400 medley relay in the 2021-2 season. She transferred to the University of Texas for the 2022-2023 season, where she trained and competed for Carol Capitani. Capitani started coaching at Texas around 2011, and during her tenure led Texas to six consecutive finishes in the top three team in the NCAA Championships. Luther earned All American honors at Texas, and in 2023 was on the University of Texas team that placed second in the National championship. She received her All American honors in the 200 butterfly, in 2023, and her Texas team won the Big 12 Conference Championship in 2023 as well.

== Competition highlights ==
At the 2019 Summer Universiade in Naples, she won a gold medal in the 200 butterfly, another gold in the 4x100 meter medley, and a silver in the 100 meter butterfly competition.

As previously noted, on December 15, 2022, she won the women's 200 meter butterfly gold medal at the 2022 FINA World Swimming Championships (25 m) held in Melbourne, Australia.
