= Catie DeLoof =

American swimmer (born 1997)

Personal information
- Full name: Catherine Elizabeth DeLoof
- Nickname: "Catie"
- Nationality: United States
- Born: February 12, 1997 (age 29) Grosse Pointe, Michigan, U.S.
- Occupation: Early career swim coach

Sport
- Sport: Swimming
- Events: 100, 200 Freestyle, Freestyle relays
- Strokes: Freestyle
- Club: Pointe Aquatics (Grosse Pointe) 2005-15; Cavalier Aquatics (Charlottesville, VA) 2020
- College team: University of Michigan
- Coach: Michael J. O'Connor (Pointe Aquatics); Mike Bottom (U. Michigan) 2015-2019; Todd DeSorbo (Cavalier) 2020
Medal record
Women's swimming
Representing the United States
Event	1st	2nd	3rd
Olympic Games	0	0	1
Pan American Games	0	3	2
Universiade	3	0	0
Total	3	3	3
Olympic Games
Bronze medal – third place	2020 Tokyo	4×100 m freestyle
Pan American Games
Silver medal – second place	2023 Santiago	4×100 m medley
Silver medal – second place	2023 Santiago	4×100 freestyle mixed
Silver medal – second place	2023 Santiago	4×100 m freestyle
Bronze medal – third place	2023 Santiago	50 m freestyle
Bronze medal – third place	2023 Santiago	100 m freestyle
Universiade
Gold medal – first place	2019 Naples	4×100 m freestyle
Gold medal – first place	2019 Naples	4×200 m freestyle
Gold medal – first place	2019 Naples	4×100 m medley
Representing the Michigan Wolverines
Event	1st	2nd	3rd
NCAA Championships	0	3	0
Total	0	3	0
By race
Event	1st	2nd	3rd
4×50 y freestyle	0	1	0
4×100 y freestyle	0	1	0
4×200 y freestyle	0	1	0
Total	0	3	0
NCAA Championships
Silver medal – second place	2018 Columbus	4×200 y freestyle
Silver medal – second place	2019 Austin	4×50 y freestyle
Silver medal – second place	2019 Austin	4×100 y freestyle

Catherine Elizabeth DeLoof (born February 12, 1997), frequently known as Catie in press coverage, is an American swimmer, who competed for the University of Michigan, and won a bronze medal in the 2020 Tokyo Olympics in the 4x100-meter freestyle relay.

== Early life and swimming ==
DeLoof was born February 12, 1997 in Grosse Pointe, Michigan, East of Detroit. She attended Grosse Pointe South High School, graduating in 2015 and swam for Pointe Aquatics from a young age and into her High School Years from 2005-2015. At Pointe Aquatics, a strong program in greater Grosse Pointe, she was managed by Head Coach Michael John O'Connor, a 1968 All-American University of Michigan swimmer who swam for Hall of Fame Michigan Coach Gus Stager. O'Connor began coaching Pointe Aquatics around 1985, remaining through around 2015. Catie also received coaching at Pointe Aquatics in High School from Kevin Haffner, who began coaching in 2012. O'Connor was known to have stressed fundamentals and to instill discipline in his age group swimmers that included several Olympic trial qualifiers including Catie's sisters Gabby and Ali.

As a High School Freshman in November, 2011, Catie captured the Ohio State Championship in Division 2, in the 100-yard freestyle with a time of 50.80 seconds. Her sister Alexandra, known as Ali, placed third in the event. A consistent performer throughout her career at Grosse Pointe High, Catie earned varsity letters all four years, twice received most valuable swimmer honors, and earned All-State honors in each of her High School years. In 2012, Catie was rated first in Ohio in the 50 freestyle with a 23.61, and in the 100 free with a 50.97.

== 2016 Olympic trials ==
She and her two sisters, Ali and Gabby, qualified for the 2016 United States Olympic Trials. At the 2016 trials in Omaha, Nebraska, Catie placed 85th overall in the 50-meter freestyle, with a time of 26.24, though she would continue to improve her times with the strong coaching she received at the University of Michigan.

== University of Michigan ==
Catie attended and competed in swimming for the University of Michigan] in Ann Arbor from 2015-2019, where she was managed by Head Coach Mike Bottom and Associate Coach Aaron Bell and majored in Sociology in the College of Literature, Science, and the Arts. Each of her three sisters, Jackie, Gabbie, and Ali also swam for Michigan. A strong regional team under a strong coach, during Catie's tenure with the Wolverine women's swim team from 2016-2018, Coach Bottom led Michigan's women's swim team to three successive Big Ten Conference titles.

Catie earned All-American honors at Michigan nine times from the College Swimming Coaches Association of America (CSCAA), beginning as a Freshman in 2019 in the 100-yard Freestyle, 200-yard Freestyle, and 200-yard Medley Relay. Catie received All American honors from 2018-19 from the CSCAA in the 200-yard Freestyle Relay, 400-yard Freestyle Relay, and the 800-yard Freestyle Relay. She was a Champion in the Big Ten conference five times in 2018-2019, in the 200-yard Freestyle Relay in 2019, and in the 800-yard freestyle relay and 400-yard Freestyle Relay, in 2018-2019.

After graduating from the University of Michigan, to remain competitive, DeLoof relocated for a period to California and trained with Team Elite coached by Hall of Famer David Marsh. In preparation for the 2020 Olympics, DeLoof moved to greater Charlottesville, Virginia to train with Todd DeSorbo, the University of Virginia coach, a 2021 Olympic team Assistant Coach, the future 2024 Head Olympic coach, and the coach of the Cavalier Swim Club.

== 2020 Tokyo Olympics ==
At the 2020 United States Olympic Trials, DeLoof finished fifth in the 100 freestyle with a 53.87, qualifying her for the 4x100-meter women's relay team at the 2020 Olympics, held in 2021. In preparation for the 2020 Olympics, the U.S. Women's Swim team trained for two weeks in Honolulu Hawaii under Women's Head Coach Greg Meehan to improve their conditioning and fitness and adjust to the Tokyo time zones. The team wore masks as a result of the COVID 19 epidemic regulations.

In late July, 2021, DeLoof swam in preliminary Heat 1 at the postponed 2020 Olympics in Tokyo in the women's 4 × 100 m freestyle relay event. Her preliminary relay team included Olivia Smoliga as lead-off swimmer, Catie swimming the second leg with a split of 53.42, with Allison Schmitt swimming third, and Natalie Hinds swimming anchor. Her preliminary team placed second with a combined time of 3:34.80, helping the women's relay team advance to the final. Later, the Women's 4x100 freestyle relay finals team won the bronze medal with a combined time of 3:29.69, whereby Catie was awarded the bronze for helping the American team advance to the finals. In the finals, the Australian team took the gold medal and the Canadian team took the silver.

On Thanksgiving morning on November 25, 2021, Catie rode on a float in the annual Thanksgiving parade staged on Detroit, Michigan's Woodward Avenue as a recent Olympian. The parade was televised on local channel 4 WDIV.

=== International competition ===
At the 2019 Universiade, in Naples, Italy, Catie won three gold medals in freestyle and medley relays.

In international competition, DeLoof performed well at the 2023 Pan American Games in Santiago. In relay events, Catie won a silver medal in the 4×100 m medley, a silver medal in the 4×100 freestyle mixed relay, a silver in the 4×100 m Women's freestyle relay. In individual events, Catie won a bronze in the Women's 50 m freestyle, and a second bronze in the Women's 100 m freestyle.

In professional swimming after 2019, at the TYR Pro Championship titles in 2023, DeLoof earned a first place in both the 50 and 100 meter freestyle events, and placed second in the 100m backstroke. At the Scottish National Championships in short course competition, she earned another first place in the 50-meter freestyle.

Deloof is a member of the International Swimming League.

=== Engagement ===
Catie was engaged to 2021 Tokyo Olympian Felix Auboeck in December 2023, with an announcement on January 1, 2024. A native of Vienna, Auboeck swam for Michigan with Catie from 2016-2020, and competed for Austria in the 2020 Olympics.

=== Coaching ===
In August, 2024, the University of Alabama announced they would hire Catie as an Assistant swimming coach beginning in the Fall swim season. As of June 2025, she was still coaching at Alabama. She was scheduled to attend the American Swimming Coaches Association Reno, Nevada World Clinic in September, 2025 one of the largest meetings for the members of the global swimming community. Catie had formerly coached age group swimming for the University of Michigan's summer swim camps from 2016-2019.
