= Bridget Williams (pole vaulter) =

American pole vaulter (born 1996)

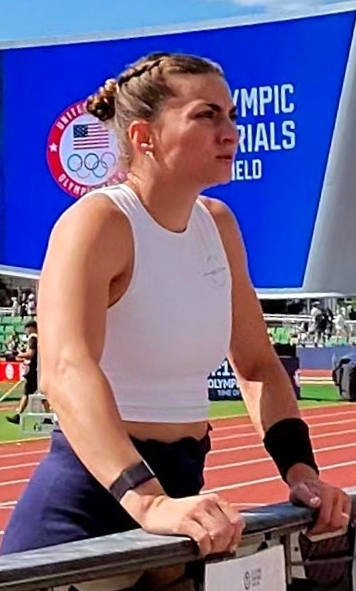
- Williams in 2024

Personal information
- Born: March 18, 1996 (age 30) Greensburg, Pennsylvania, U.S.
- Employer: UST ESSX VAULTING POLES
- Height: 5 ft 6 in (168 cm)

Sport
- Country: United States
- Sport: Athletics; Track and field
- Event: Pole Vault
- Turned pro: 2019

Achievements and titles
- Personal best(s): Pole Vault: Outdoor: 4.71 m (15 ft 5 in) (Knoxville, 2021); Indoor: 4.83 m (15 ft 10 in) (Clermont-Ferrand, 2024)
Medal record
Women's athletics
Representing United States
Pan American Games
Gold medal – first place	2023 Santiago	Pole vault

Bridget Williams (née Guy born March 18, 1996) is an American track and field athlete who competes in the pole vault. Williams grew up training and competing in Artistic Gymnastics, but started competing pole vaulting at her Junior High school, with some success in high school she earned an athletic scholarship to the University of Virginia. Williams finished fourth at the US national championships in Eugene, Oregon in July 2023. She was selected for the 2023 World Athletics Championships in Budapest in August 2023. She qualified for the final with a clearance of 4.65 metres. She won the gold medal in the pole vault at the 2023 Pan American Games in Santiago, Chile. She won the 2024 US Olympic trials with a clearance of 4.73 metres. At the 2024 Paris Olympics games, Williams finished 12th in her heat, resulting in a 22nd place overall, which resulted in her not qualifying to the finals.

== Professional career ==
Representing the United States
Year	Competition	Venue	Position	Event	Result
2024	Olympic Games	Paris, France	22nd (q)	Pole vault	4.60 m (15 ft 1 in)
2023	Pan American Games	Santiago, Chile	1st	Pole Vault	4.60 m (15 ft 1 in)
2023	World Championships	Budapest, Hungary	12th	Pole Vault	4.50 m (14 ft 9 in)
2023	World Athletics Indoor Tour	Birmingham, England	6th	Pole Vault	4.51 m (14 ft 10 in)
2019	World Universities Games	Naples, Italy	3rd	Pole Vault	4.31 m (14 ft 2 in)

== National championships ==
Year	Competition	Venue	Position	Event	Notes
2015	USATF U20 Outdoor Championships	Eugene, Oregon	9th	Pole vault	3.95 m (12 ft 11 1/2 in)
2019	USATF Championships	Des Moines, Iowa	10th	pole vault	NH @ 4.40 m (14 ft 5 in)
2020	USATF Championships	Albuquerque, New Mexico	11th	pole vault	4.35 m (14 ft 3 1/4 in)
2021	US Olympic Trials	Eugene, Oregon	9th	pole vault	4.50 m (14 ft 9 in)
2022	USATF Championships	Spokane, Washington	3rd	pole vault	4.70 m (15 ft 5 in)
2022	USATF Championships	Eugene, Oregon	7th	pole vault	4.50 m (14 ft 9 in)
2023	USATF Championships	Albuquerque, New Mexico	3rd	pole vault	4.61 m (15 ft 1 1/4 in)
2023	USATF Championships	Eugene, Oregon	4th	pole vault	4.61 m (15 ft 1 1/4 in)
2024	US Olympic Trials	Eugene, Oregon	1st	pole vault	4.73 m (15 ft 6 in)

== NCAA Vaulting ==
Bridget is a 3-time NCAA Division I All-American as a Virginia Cavaliers track and field student-athlete. As a 6-time all conference performer in the Atlantic Coast Conference, Bridget won 2 ACC crowns.

Bridget Williams improved from 3.81 m (12 ft 6 in) to 4.50 m (14 ft 9 in) while at UVA. Williams attended the University of Virginia between 2015 and 2019.

Bridget Williams left University of Virginia as a school record holder pole vaulter.

== High School ==
Bridget Williams won 2014 Penn high school AAA state final clearing a Hempfield Area High School pole vault record 3.81 m (12 ft 6 in).

== Media ==
- December 2023 - Just A Cup - Bridget Williams - Justa Cup is an organic conversation with some of the world’s greatest athletes and the coaches who coach them hosted by Coach Bryan Fetzer over a cup of coffee
