= Gabby DeLoof =

American swimmer (born 1996)

Personal information
- Full name: Gabrielle Marie DeLoof
- Born: March 13, 1996 (age 30) Grosse Pointe, Michigan, U.S.

Sport
- Sport: Swimming
- Strokes: Freestyle
Medal record
Women's swimming
Representing the United States
World Championships (LC)
Silver medal – second place	2019 Gwangju	4×200 m freestyle
World University Games
Gold medal – first place	2019 Naples	100 m freestyle
Gold medal – first place	2019 Naples	200 m freestyle
Gold medal – first place	2019 Naples	4×100 m freestyle
Gold medal – first place	2019 Naples	4×200 m freestyle
Gold medal – first place	2019 Naples	4×100 m medley

Gabrielle Marie DeLoof (born March 13, 1996) is an American swimmer.

She participated at the 2019 World Aquatics Championships, winning a silver medal for her participation in the team that came second in the heats.

She is the sister of 2020 Olympian Catie Deloof.

For the 2021 International Swimming League, the team Tokyo Frog Kings signed DeLoof to their roster.
