= Ian Finnerty =

American swimmer (born 1996)

Personal information
- Nationality: American
- Born: August 2, 1996 (age 29) Bloomington, Indiana, United States
- Height: 1.93 m (6 ft 4 in)
- Weight: 86 kg (190 lb)

Sport
- Sport: Swimming
- Strokes: Breaststroke, Individual Medley
- Club: DC Trident; Indiana Swim Club
- College team: Indiana University

Ian Finnerty (born August 2, 1996) is a retired American competitive swimmer who specialized in the breaststroke and individual medley events. He represented the DC Trident which is part of the International Swimming League.

Finnerty is the current holder of the American record in the 100 yard breaststroke and a former American record holder in the short course 50 meter breaststroke and 100 meter breaststroke events.

== Early life ==
Ian Finnerty was born August 2, 1996, in Bloomington, Indiana, as the son of Stephen Finnerty and Dina Adkins. Finnerty attended Bloomington High School South and was an All-American in the 100-yard breaststroke, 100-yard butterfly, 200-yard medley and the 400 freestyle relays. He was also the school record holder in the 100-yard butterfly and breaststroke. Finnerty swam collegiately at Indiana University Bloomington from 2015 to 2019.

== College career ==
As a freshman for the Indiana Hoosiers, he won his first Big Ten Conference Championship title in the 100-yard breaststroke with a 51.75. Finnerty also placed fourth in the 200-yard IM and sixth in the 200-yard breaststroke. At the 2016 Men's NCAA Division I Championships, he qualified for the B-final in the 100-yard breaststroke and finished 13th with a time of 52.60.

The following year as a sophomore, Finnerty defended his B1G Championships title and took the first place in the 100-yard breaststroke with a 51.38. He bettered his placement in the 200 IM and moved up to second place. At the 2016 Men's NCAA Division I Championships, Finnerty finished 17th in the 100-yard breaststroke. He was also a member of both medley relays, helping the Hoosiers place sixth in the 400-yard medley relay.

Finnerty won the 100-yard breaststroke at the B1G Championships for the third year in a row with a 50.72. He also won the 200 breaststroke with a best time of 1:50.78. At the 2018 NCAA Division I Championships, Finnerty became the first swimmer to break the 50 second mark in the 100-yard breaststroke by going a 49.69. Finnerty's time of 49.69 seconds set a new American record in the event and broke the freshly minted record Caeleb Dressel set not two months earlier at 50.03 seconds. This was his first individual NCAA title. He also won the 200-yard breaststroke with a time of 1:50.17, a new Big Ten record for the event, contributed to the first-place finish in the 400-yard medley relay, and became the first male swimmer from Indiana University to sweep the breaststroke events at a single NCAA championships.

As a senior, Finnerty successfully defended his B1G title in the 100-yard breaststroke, making it a clean sweep of all 4 years. He placed third in the 200 IM, and successfully defended his B1G title in the 200 breaststroke, with a new meet record of 1:50.30. At the 2019 NCAA Division I Championships, Finnerty defended his NCAA title in the 100-yard breaststroke going under 50 for the second year straight. He placed seventh overall in the 200-yard IM and third in the 200-yard breaststroke. He was also a member of the 400-yard medley relay that finished first once again.

== International career ==
At the 2016 U.S. Olympic Trials, Finnerty placed 11th in the 100m breaststroke.

=== 2019 World University Games ===
At the 2018 National Swimming Championships in Irvine, California, Finnerty finished third in the 50m Breaststroke (27.19) and tied for 10th in the 100m breaststroke (1:00.93), which gave him a spot on the 2019 World University Games roster. At the meet he won gold in the 100m and bronze in the 50m breaststroke.

=== International Swimming League ===
Finnerty was a member of the inaugural International Swimming League (ISL) representing DC Trident. He competed at the first two matches held in Indianapolis, Indiana and Naples, Italy, as well as on the American Derby held in College Park, Maryland. In the American Derby, Finnerty broke two American short course meters records in the 50m and 100m breaststroke with 25.99 and 56.29. His time of 25.99 seconds marked the first time an American swimmer finished the short course 50 meter breaststroke in less than 26 seconds and was over a tenth of a second faster than the record he broke of 26.10 seconds set by Michael Andrew in 2018. For the 100 meter breaststroke, his time of 56.29 seconds was also over one tenth of a second faster than the former American record set by Cody Miller at 56.43 seconds.

== National records ==
=== Short course meters (25 m pool) ===
| Event | Time | Meet | Location | Date | Age | Type | Status | Ref |
|---|---|---|---|---|---|---|---|---|
| 50 m breaststroke | 25.99 | 2019 International Swimming League | College Park, Maryland | November 16, 2019 | 23 | NR, US | Former | |
| 100 m breaststroke | 56.29 | 2019 International Swimming League | College Park, Maryland | November 17, 2019 | 23 | NR, US | Former | |

Legend: NR – American record; US – US Open record

=== Shorts course yards (25 yd pool) ===
| Event | Time | Meet | Location | Date | Age | Type | Status | Ref |
|---|---|---|---|---|---|---|---|---|
| 100 yd breaststroke | 49.69 | 2018 NCAA Championships | Minneapolis, Minnesota | March 23, 2018 | 21 | NR, US | Former | |

Legend: NR – American record; US – US Open record
