= Tayla Lovemore =

South African swimmer (born 1995)

Personal information
- Nationality: South African
- Born: 20 March 1995 (age 31)

Sport
- Sport: Swimming
- Strokes: Butterfly, freestyle
Medal record
Representing South Africa
Summer Universiade
Gold medal – first place	2019 Naples	50m butterfly
Gold medal – first place	2019 Naples	100m butterfly

Tayla Lovemore (born 20 March 1995), is a South African swimmer who specializes in women's butterfly events and freestyle relay. She competed in the women's 4 × 100 metre freestyle relay at the 2019 World Aquatics Championships.

Recruited to swim at Indian River State College, Lovemore received the 2016 NJCAA Women's Swimmer of the Year award during her graduating year. In March 2022, Lovemore was named as a NJCAA Hall of Fame inductee.

She continued her collegiate swimming career at Florida State University, where she was named ACC Swimmer of the Week by collegeswimming.com. Becoming a Graduate Assistant afterward, Lovemore worked while receiving her master's degree. She then joined the International Swimming League, signing with the New York Breakers for Season 1 and the Toronto Titans for Season 2. As of September 2023, she ranked #68 for the top 100 all-time on a 50m butterfly short course performance and #84 for the top 100 all-time on a 100m butterfly short course performance.
