= María José Mata Cocco =

Mexican swimmer (born 1994)

Personal information
- Born: 3 December 1994 (age 31) San Luis Potosí City, Mexico

Sport
- Sport: Swimming
Medal record
Representing Mexico
Pan American Games
| Silver medal – second place | 2023 Santiago | 200m butterfly |
Central American and Caribbean Games
| Gold medal – first place | 2023 Santa Tecla | 100m butterfly |
| Gold medal – first place | 2023 Santa Tecla | 200m butterfly |
| Gold medal – first place | 2023 Santa Tecla | 4x100m medley relay |
| Silver medal – second place | 2014 Veracruz | 200m butterfly |
| Bronze medal – third place | 2018 Barranquilla | 200m butterfly |

María José Mata Cocco (born 3 December 1994) is a Mexican swimmer. She competed in the women's 200 metre butterfly event at the 2017 World Aquatics Championships.
