= Emily Escobedo =

American swimmer (born 1995)

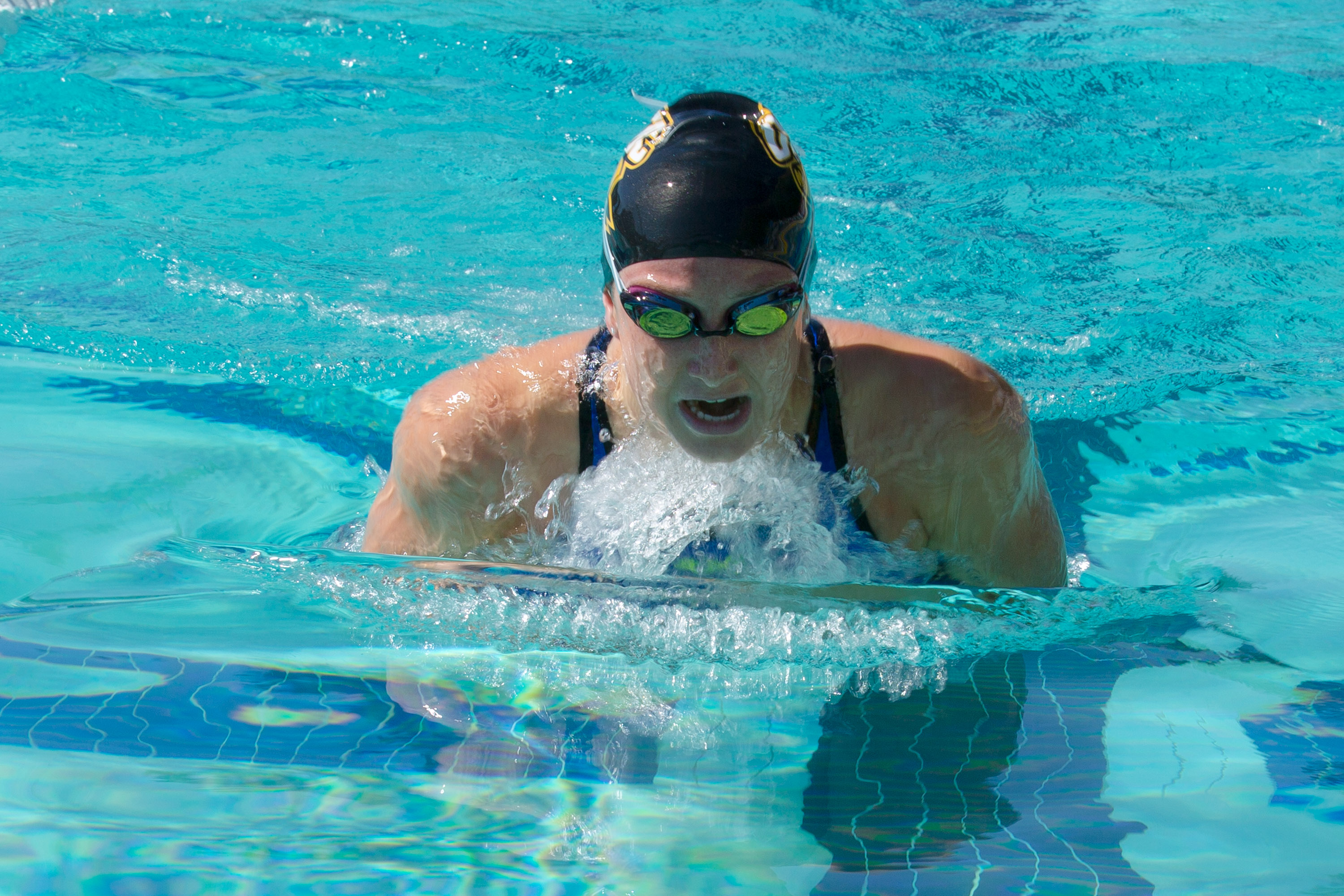
- Escobedo, swimming the 200m breaststroke in 2017 while competing for University of Maryland

Personal information
- Born: December 17, 1995 (age 30) New Rochelle, New York, U.S.
- Education: University of Maryland BC ('17); Lehman College (MA Special Ed.)
- Height: 5 ft 8 in (173 cm)

Sport
- Sport: Swimming
- Event: 200 breaststroke
- Strokes: Breaststroke
- Club: White Plains YMCA's Riptides; Condor Swim Club; New York Breakers (Pro)
- College team: U. Maryland, Baltimore County
- Coach: Chad Cradock (U. Maryland, BC)
Medal record
Women's swimming
Representing the United States
World Championships (SC)
Gold medal – first place	2021 Abu Dhabi	200 m breaststroke
Silver medal – second place	2021 Abu Dhabi	4×50 m medley
World University Games
Gold medal – first place	2019 Naples	4×100 m medley
Silver medal – second place	2019 Naples	200 m breaststroke

Emily Escobedo (born December 17, 1995) is an American swimmer who competed for the University of Maryland, Baltimore County. She competed in the women's 200 metre breaststroke event at the 2021 FINA World Swimming Championships (25 m) in Abu Dhabi, winning the gold medal. She won a second gold medal at the 2019 World University games in Naples, Italy, in the 4x100 meter medley and a silver in the 200 meter breaststroke, her signature event.

== Biography ==
=== Early life ===
Escobedo was born the older of two siblings to Peter and Ginny Escobedo in New Rochelle, New York. She had a younger sister, Katie. Graduating in 2013, she attended Maria Regina High School, a Catholic college-prep school in Hartsdale, Westchester County, where in her Senior year she was President of the Student Council. Though her High School had a strong academic program, it had no swim team, so she swam for progressively more demanding club programs from an early age. Beginning competitive swimming at 5, Escobedo swam for New Rochelle's Davenport Beach Club. By six, she represented the White Plains YMCA's Riptides team. She moved to the Condor Swim Club around age 12.

=== 2012 Olympic trials ===
As a High School upperclassman, Escobedo qualified and attended the late June U.S. 2012 Olympic trials in Omaha, Nebraska, where she competed in the 200 breaststroke, having qualified at the 2011 Long Course Nationals. Though she advanced to the semi-final round, she did not make the finals.

=== University of Maryland, Baltimore County ===
Escobedo attended the University of Maryland from 2013-2017, where she excelled and swam each of her four collegiate years in the NCAA Championships. She graduated with a Psychology degree with Cum Laude Honors around 2017. At U. Maryland Baltimore County, she was coached by Chad Cradock, who coached the women's team from 2001-2020. Cradock's program helped drop her times, by improving her technique, and comitting to a well-focused weight training program. In both 2016 and 2017, during Escobedo's tenure, Coach Cradock let Maryland to American East Conference Championships. In both 2016 and 2017, she placed third nationally in the 200 breaststroke. In the 200 IM, she was a recipient of Honorable Mention All American honors.

She was the first America East swimming competitor to receive the Swimmer of the Year award on four separate occasions and led Maryland to league titles in three successive years. She has held five U. Maryland Baltimore County individual school records, and contributed to top times in four University of Maryland relay teams. An able scholar, she was a College Swimming & Diving Coaches Association of America (CSCAA) Scholar twice. She was the first University of Maryland Baltimore County swimmer to compete for the USA Swimming national team, and at the Abu Dhabi FINA World Swimming Championships, placed first in the 200-meter breaststroke.

=== Professional swimming ===
In 2020, Escobedo had a third placed global ranking in the 200-meter breaststroke, and had swum for the professional International Swimming League's New York Breakers in Budapest, Hungary for two years. She had plans to train for the 2024 Paris Olympics, and make the U.S. team in the 200 meter breaststroke, though her chances were limited by American rivals Lilly King and Annie Lazor, who both had faster times in the event.

=== Education and career goals ===
In 2020, having graduated the University of Maryland Baltimore County around 2017, she took graduate courses at Lehman College, working towards a Masters Degree in Special Education and Early Childhood Education.

== International Achievements ==
Short Course Swimming World Championships
Year	Location	Medal	Event
2021	Abu Dhabi	Gold	200m Breaststroke
