= 2001–02 Australian Athletics Championships =

- Dates: 11–14 April 2002
- Host city: Brisbane, Australia
- Venue: Queensland Sport and Athletics Centre
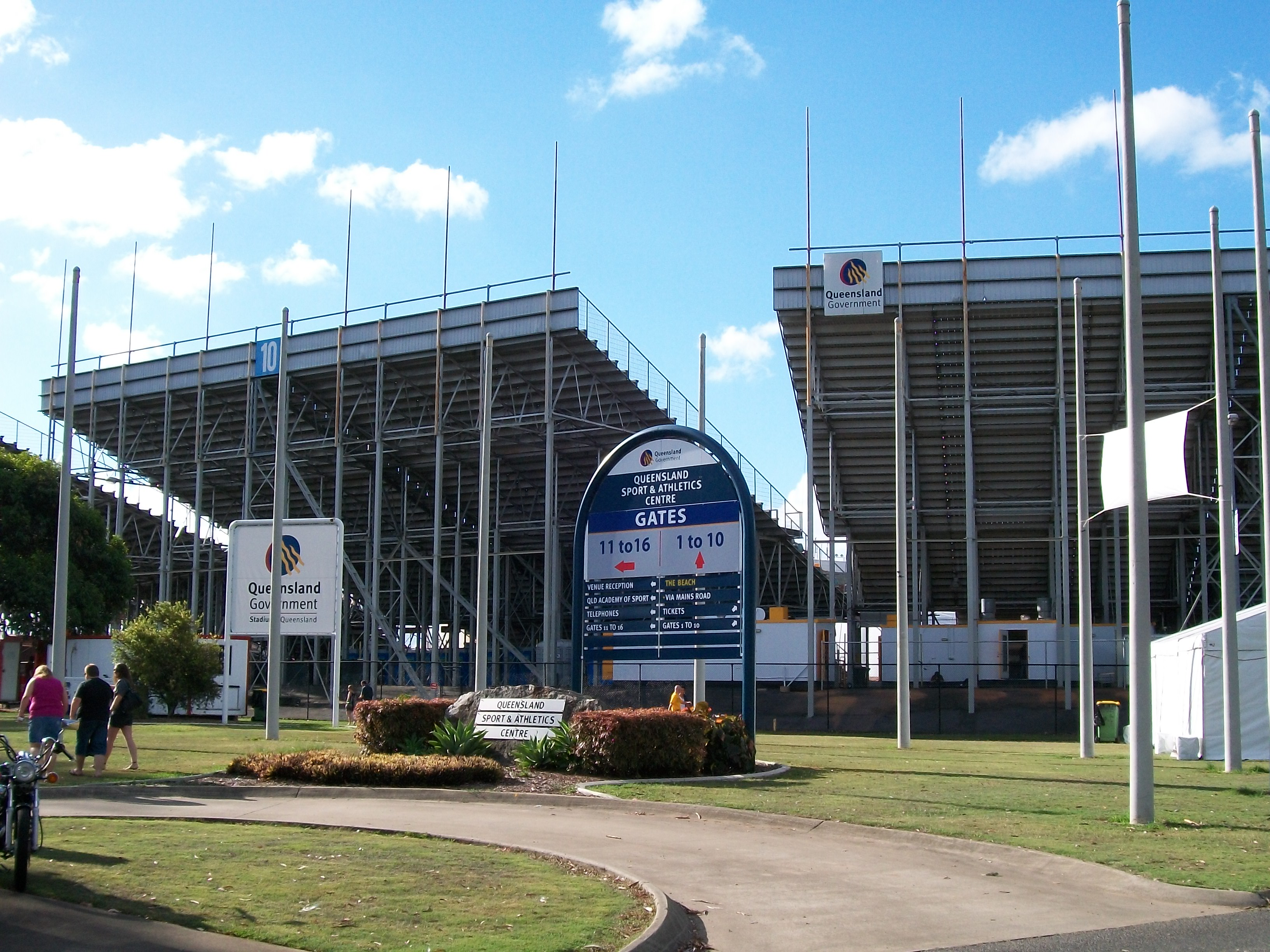

The 2001–02 Australian Athletics Championships was the 80th edition of the national championship in outdoor track and field for Australia. It was held from 11–14 April 2002 at the Queensland Sport and Athletics Centre in Brisbane. It served as a selection meeting for Australia at the 2002 Commonwealth Games. The 5000 metres events were held separately in Melbourne on 7 March 2002.

== Medal summary ==
=== Men ===
Event	Gold		Silver		Bronze	
100 metres (Wind: -0.3 m/s)	Matt Shirvington; New South Wales	10.31	Paul Di Bella; Queensland	10.32	Darren Campbell; Great Britain (GBR)	10.38
200 metres (Wind: +1.0 m/s)	David Geddes; New South Wales	20.62	Dallas Roberts; New Zealand (NZL)	20.85	Darren Campbell; Great Britain (GBR)	20.87
400 metres	Clinton Hill; New South Wales	45.98	Michael Rehardt; Queensland	46.00	Paul Pearce; Victoria	46.07
800 metres	Nicholas Hudson; Queensland	1:49.51	Todd MacDonald; New South Wales	1:49.75	Marcus Katter; New South Wales	1:50.31
1500 metres	Craig Mottram; Victoria	3:41.19	Youcef Abdi; New South Wales	3:42.64	Clinton Mackevicius; Victoria	3:43.12
5000 metres	Stephen Cherono; Kenya (KEN)	13:11.55	Craig Mottram; Victoria	13:12.04	Michael Power; Victoria	13:39.94
10,000 metres	Shaun Creighton; Australian Capital Territory	28:45.44	Sisay Bezabeh; Australian Capital Territory	28:48.15	Michael Power; Victoria	28:49.73
110 metres hurdles (Wind: -1.1 m/s)	Colin Jackson; Great Britain (GBR)	13.71	Timothy Ewen; Victoria	14.05	Kyle Vander-Kuyp; Victoria	14.14
400 metres hurdles	Olivier Jean-Theodore; France (FRA)	49.27	Matthew Elias; Great Britain (GBR)	49.77	Michael Hazel; Victoria	49.85
3000 metres steeplechase	Peter Nowill; Queensland	8:48.66	Martin Dent; New South Wales	8:54.81	Ryan Taylor; Victoria	8:55.86
4 × 100 m relay	New South Wales (NSW); Brad McNicol; Nathan Anderson; Ross Smith; Ambrose Ezenwa	40.50	Victoria (VIC); Justin Lewis; Michael Budlender; Lane Harrison; David Baxter	41.34	South Australia (SA); Damien Byrne; Brad Jamieson; Mark Ormrod; David Rose	41.55
4 × 400 m relay	Victoria (VIC); Lee Wiseman; Marty Duke; Michael Hazel; Peter Ladd	3:14.68	Queensland (QLD); Michael Rehardt; Eugene Farrell; Garth Silva; William Caswell	3:15.67	New South Wales (NSW); Clinton Hill; Patrick Dwyer; Nathan Anderson; Elliot Wood	3:16.89
High jump	Nicholas Moroney; New South Wales	2.22 m	Joshua Lodge; New South Wales	2.22 m	Jarrad Pozzi; Western Australia	2.18 m
Pole vault	Paul Burgess; Western Australia	5.55 m	Alex Miroshnichenko; Queensland Luke Vedelago; Queensland	5.15 m	Not awarded	
Long jump	Timothy Parravicini; Queensland	7.94 m (-1.2 m/s)	Shane Hair; Western Australia	7.72 m (+0.4 m/s)	Peter Parsons; New South Wales	7.55 m (+0.0 m/s)
Triple jump	Andrew Murphy; New South Wales	16.53 m (+0.2 m/s)	Jacob McReynolds; New South Wales	16.46 m (+0.4 m/s)	Joshua Ferguson; Queensland	16.19 m (+0.0 m/s)
Shot put	Justin Anlezark; Queensland	19.22 m	Clay Cross; New South Wales	18.96 m	Rhys Jones; Queensland	18.02 m
Discus throw	Peter Elvy; New South Wales	57.75 m	Christopher Gaviglio; Queensland	56.23 m	Benn Harradine; New South Wales	56.17 m
Hammer throw	Stuart Rendell; Australian Capital Territory	78.80 m	Aaron Fish; Queensland	70.72 m	Justin McDonald; Victoria	64.06 m
Javelin throw	Andrew Currey; New South Wales	81.46 m	William Hamlyn-Harris; New South Wales	78.72 m	Andrew Hall; Western Australia	75.02 m
Decathlon	Scott Ferrier; Victoria	7888 pts	Matthew McEwen; Queensland	7724 pts	Darrel Muzyczka; New South Wales	7210 pts

=== Women ===
Event	Gold		Silver		Bronze	
100 metres (Wind: +0.9 m/s)	Lauren Hewitt; Victoria	11.40	Gloria Kemasoude; Nigeria (NGR)	11.45	Joice Maduaka; Great Britain (GBR)	11.50
200 metres (Wind: +1.2 m/s)	Lauren Hewitt; Victoria	22.91	Vernicha James; Great Britain (GBR)	23.13	Sharon Cripps; Queensland	23.36
400 metres	Catherine Murphy; Great Britain (GBR)	52.18	Jane Arnott; New Zealand (NZL)	52.73	Katerina Dressler; Victoria	52.97
800 metres	Tamsyn Lewis; Victoria	2:00.88	Susan Andrews; Western Australia	2:02.40	Adrienne McIvor; Queensland	2:03.25
1500 metres	Georgie Clarke; Victoria	4:14.17	Sarah Jamieson; Victoria	4:15.47	Benita Johnson; Queensland	4:15.83
5000 metres	Haley McGregor; Victoria	15:32.17	Benita Johnson; Queensland	15:35.73	Anna Thompson; Victoria	15:44.29
10,000 metres	Kerryn McCann; New South Wales	33:20.72	Serena Gibbs; Victoria	34:57.80	Susan Michelsson; Victoria	35:56.04
100 metres hurdles (Wind: -1.3 m/s)	Jacquie Munro; New South Wales	13.31	Fiona Cullen; Queensland	13.40	Georgina Power; Victoria	13.88
400 metres hurdles	Jana Pittman; New South Wales	55.34	Sonia Brito; Victoria	55.50	Tracey Duncan; Great Britain (GBR)	56.76
3000 metres steeplechase	Melissa Rollison; Queensland	9:56.92	Victoria Mitchell; Victoria	10:36.98	Kate Seibold; Victoria	11:26.13
4 × 100 m relay	Queensland (QLD); Amy Harris; Sharon Cripps; Melanie Kleeberg; Fiona Cullen	45.58	New South Wales (NSW); Nicole Apps; Merryn Aldridge; Mindy Slomka; Prue Robertson	46.12	South Australia (SA); Meagan Rentsch; Michelle Apostolou; Paula Lodge; Lauren Foote	48.52
4 × 400 m relay	New South Wales (NSW); Stephanie Price; Amber Donnelley; Rosemary Hayward; Jana Pittman	3:33.16	Victoria (VIC); Anne Deller; Renee Robson; Georgina Power; Tamsyn Lewis	3:44.51	Queensland (QLD); Katrina Sendall; Elizabeth Beston; Amy Wright; Rebecca Sadler	3:56.31
High jump	Petrina Price; New South Wales	1.82 m	Alexandra Church; New South Wales Vicki Collins; Queensland Casey Narrier; Western Australia Peta Mason; Queensland	1.78 m	Not awarded	
Pole vault	Tatiana Grigorieva; South Australia	4.44 m	Kym Howe; Western Australia	4.32 m	Bridgid Isworth; Victoria	4.20 m
Long jump	Bronwyn Thompson; Queensland	6.77 m (+0.2 m/s)	Kerrie Perkins; Queensland	6.36 m (+0.2 m/s)	Nicole Boegman; New South Wales	6.31 m (+0.4 m/s)
Triple jump	Nicole Mladenis; Western Australia	13.62 m (-0.4 m/s)	Michelle Apostolou; South Australia	12.83 m (+0.0 m/s)	Frith Maunder; New Zealand (NZL)	12.67 m (-0.2 m/s)
Shot put	Michelle Haage; New South Wales	15.51 m	Anna Pouhila; New Zealand (NZL)	14.95 m	Alifatou Djibril; South Australia	14.91 m
Discus throw	Beatrice Faumuina; New Zealand (NZL)	63.41 m	Alison Lever; Queensland	60.29 m	Monique Nacsa; Queensland	57.24 m
Hammer throw	Bronwyn Eagles; New South Wales	69.65 m	Brooke Krueger; South Australia	66.11 m	Karyne Di Marco; New South Wales	65.71 m
Javelin throw	Bina Ramesh; France (FRA)	56.93 m	Takako Miyake; Japan (JPN)	56.61 m	Cecilia McIntosh; Victoria	53.87 m
Heptathlon	Clare Thompson; Victoria	5804 pts	Kylie Wheeler; Western Australia	5698 pts	Mandy Heath; New South Wales	5555 pts
