= 2019–20 Australian Athletics Championships =

The main national championships for the 2019–20 season of outdoor track and field in Australia were not held due to impacts of the COVID-19 pandemic, but eight events were completed prior to the cancellation. The 10,000 metres took place at the Zatopek 10K on 14 December 2019 at Lakeside Stadium in Melbourne, the mile run took place at the Albie Thomas meet at the Crest Athletic Centre in Bankstown on 21 December 2019, and the 5000 metres took place at the Melbourne Track Classic on 6 February 2020. The decathlon and heptathlon championships were held in Brisbane on 15 and 16 February 2020.

== Medal summary ==
=== Men ===
| Event | Gold | | Silver | | Bronze | |
|---|---|---|---|---|---|---|
| Mile run | Sam Ellis; United States (USA) | 4:14.49 | Rorey Hunter; New South Wales | 4:14.60 | James Hansen; Tasmania | 4:14.60 |
| 5000 metres | Stewart McSweyn; Tasmania | 13:38.77 | Matthew Ramsden; Western Australia | 13:48.67 | Sam McEntee; Victoria | 3:49.28 |
| 10,000 metres | Stewart McSweyn; Tasmania | 27:23.80 | Patrick Tiernan; Queensland | 27:31.20 | Jack Bruce; Queensland | 28:15.94 |
| Decathlon | Cedric Dubler; Queensland | 7900 pts | David Brock; Victoria | 7276 pts | Alec Diamond; New South Wales | 7083 pts |

=== Women ===
| Event | Gold | | Silver | | Bronze | |
|---|---|---|---|---|---|---|
| Mile run | Georgia Griffith; Victoria | 4:36.29 | Chloe Tighe; New South Wales | 4:37.34 | Jenny Blundell; New South Wales | 4:37.71 |
| 5000 metres | Jessica Hull; New South Wales | 15:06.12 | Hitomi Niiya; Japan (JPN) | 15:15.41 | Genevieve Gregson; Queensland | 15:20.60 |
| 10,000 metres | Genevieve Gregson; Queensland | 2:47.83 | Andrea Seccafien; Canada (CAN) | 32:48.30 | Emily Brichacek; New South Wales | 32:57.58 |
| Heptathlon | Tori West; Queensland | 6028 pts | Rachel Limburg; Victoria | 5471 pts | Andrea Thompson; Australian Capital Territory | 5343 pts |
