= Nicholas Hudson (athlete) =

Australian middle-distance runner

Nicholas Hudson (born 9 November 1972) is an Australian former middle-distance runner who was the national champion over 800 metres at the Australian Athletics Championships in 2001–02.
