= 1998–99 Australian Athletics Championships =

- Dates: 18–20 February 1999
- Host city: Melbourne, Australia
- Venue: Olympic Park Stadium
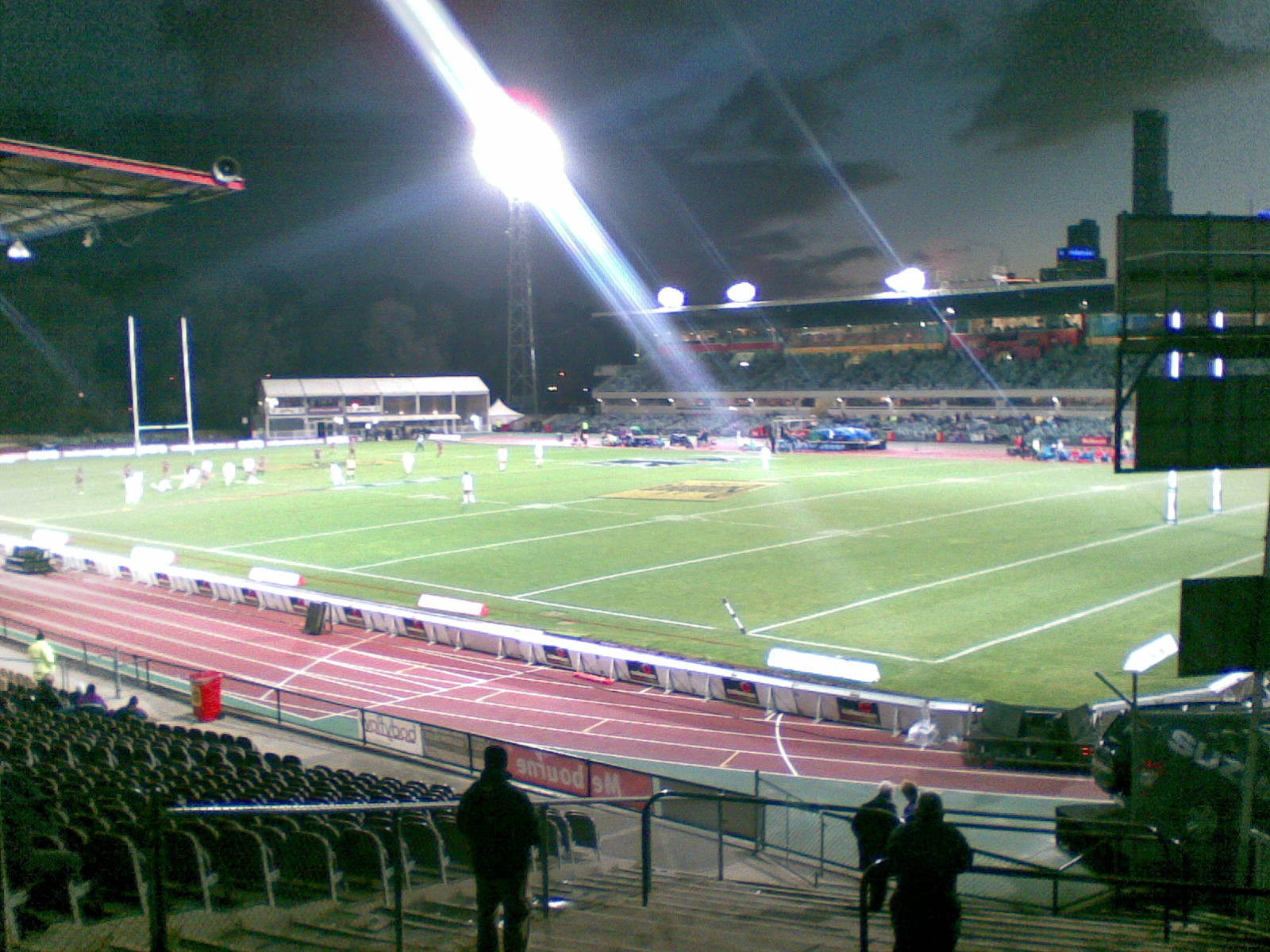

The 1998–99 Australian Athletics Championships was the 77th edition of the national championship in outdoor track and field for Australia. It was held from 18–20 February 1999 at the Olympic Park Stadium in Melbourne. It served as a selection meeting for Australia at the 1999 World Championships in Athletics. The 10,000 metres event took place separately at the Zatopek 10K on 5 December 1998 at Lakeside Stadium in Melbourne. The combined events were also held separately at the Hobart Grand Prix on 25–26 February 1999.

== Medal summary ==
=== Men ===
Event	Gold		Silver		Bronze	
100 metres (Wind: -0.8 m/s)	Matt Shirvington; New South Wales	10.24	Adam Basil; Victoria	10.34	Chris Donaldson; New Zealand (NZL)	10.37
200 metres (Wind: -0.4 m/s)	Chris Donaldson; New Zealand (NZL)	20.71	Matt Shirvington; New South Wales	20.77	Marc Foucan; France (FRA)	20.86
400 metres	Brad Jamieson; South Australia	45.59	Ibrahima Wade; Senegal (SEN)	46.03	Casey Vincent; Victoria	46.16
800 metres	Noah Ngeny; Kenya (KEN)	1:47.70	Grant Cremer; New South Wales	1:48.10	Brendan Hanigan; Tasmania	1:48.72
1500 metres	Paul Cleary; Victoria	3:43.59	Scott Petersen; Victoria	3:43.99	Justin Rinaldi; Victoria	3:44.25
5000 metres	Benjamin Maiyo; Kenya (KEN)	13:26.09	Mizan Mehari; Australian Capital Territory	13:31.02	Martin Keino; Kenya (KEN)	13:35.09
10,000 metres	Luke Kipkosgei; Kenya (KEN)	27:22.54	Benjamin Maiyo; Kenya (KEN)	27:40.34	Lee Troop; Victoria	28:04.64
110 metres hurdles (Wind: -0.6 m/s)	Kyle Vander-Kuyp; Victoria	13.73	Rodney Zuyderwyk; Queensland	14.05	David Rose; South Australia	14.17
400 metres hurdles	Dai Tamesue; Japan (JPN)	49.39	Zid Abou Hamed; New South Wales	49.47	Rohan Robinson; Victoria	49.57
400 metres hurdles	Martin Dent; New South Wales	8:39.33	Stephen Thurston; South Australia	8:41.50	Hiromitsu Sakakieda; Japan (JPN)	8:54.97
4 × 100 m relay	Homebush Track Club; New South Wales (NSW); Dean Capobianco; Andrew McManus; Shem Hollands; Rodney Buchanan	40.00	Wellington; New Zealand (NZL); Donald MacDonald; Mathew Coad; Robert Bruce; James Panton	40.16	University of Western Australia; Western Australia (WA); Craig Duncan; Andrew Murray; Michael Bogdanis; Declan Stack	44.98
4 × 400 m relay	Western Athletics; Victoria (VIC); Peter Walsh; Robbie Lynch; Paul Tobin; Justin Clark	3:09.31	North Harbour Bays Cougar; New Zealand (NZL); Mark Wilson; Mark Keddell; Nick Cowan; Callum Taylor	3:09.93	University of Queensland; Queensland (QLD); Eugene Farrell; Nicholas Lorenz; Mark Abercromby; Peter Wall	3:12.28
High jump	Ronald Garlett; South Australia	2.18 m	Christopher Anderson; Western Australia	2.14 m	Nick Moroney; New South Wales	2.14 m
Pole vault	Viktor Chistiakov; South Australia	5.40 m	Paul Burgess; Western Australia	5.30 m	David Cardone; South Australia	5.10 m
Long jump	Shane Hair; New South Wales	8.01 m (+0.3 m/s)	Jai Taurima; Queensland	7.99 m (+0.2 m/s)	Leigh Stuart; Victoria	7.72 m (+0.3 m/s)
Triple jump	Andrew Murphy; New South Wales	17.04 m (+0.6 m/s)	Jacob McReynolds; Queensland	15.92 m (+0.9 m/s)	Takashi Komatsu; Japan (JPN)	15.89 m (+0.7 m/s)
Shot put	Clay Cross; New South Wales	18.89 m	Aaron Neighbour; Victoria	18.26 m	Rhys Jones; Queensland	16.81 m
Discus throw	Gerard Duffy; Queensland	53.32 m	Peter Elvy; New South Wales	52.71 m	Yohan Amerasekera; Victoria	51.81 m
Hammer throw	Stuart Rendell; Australian Capital Territory	70.79 m	Justin McDonald; Tasmania	64.25 m	Russell Devine; Victoria	62.04 m
Javelin throw	Andrew Currey; New South Wales	76.67 m	Richard Brockett; Queensland	72.46 m	Victor Tipotio; France (FRA)	71.51 m
Decathlon	Scott Ferrier; Victoria	8056 pts	Jagan Hames; South Australia	7488 pts	Warren Evans; Queensland	6869 pts

=== Women ===
Event	Gold		Silver		Bronze	
100 metres (Wind: -0.9 m/s)	Lauren Hewitt; Victoria	11.48	Jodi Lambert; Western Australia	11.65	Sharon Cripps; Queensland	11.68
200 metres (Wind: -0.4 m/s)	Lauren Hewitt; Victoria	23.08	Jodi Lambert; Western Australia	23.48	Sharon Cripps; Queensland	23.74
400 metres	Cathy Freeman; Victoria	50.94	Tania Van Heer; South Australia	51.28	Susan Andrews; Western Australia	52.01
800 metres	Tamsyn Lewis; Victoria	2:02.29	Georgie Clarke; Victoria	2:02.49	Faith Macharia; Kenya (KEN)	2:03.65
1500 metres	Sarah Jamieson; Victoria	4:18.75	Mandy Giblin; Tasmania	4:22.67	Christine Pfitzinger; New Zealand (NZL)	4:24.27
5000 metres	Natalie Harvey; Victoria	15:34.07	Kylie Risk; Tasmania	15:38.42	Susie Power; Victoria	15:41.69
10,000 metres	Natalie Harvey; Victoria	32:20.58	Kerryn McCann; New South Wales	32:23.79	Kylie Risk; Tasmania	32:33.18
100 metres hurdles (Wind: +0.5 m/s)	Eunice Barber; France (FRA)	13.36	Nicole Ramalalanirina; France (FRA)	13.36	Jacquie Munro; New South Wales	13.51
400 metres hurdles	Lauren Poetschka; Western Australia	57.05	Evette Cordy; Victoria	57.09	Nicola Kidd; New Zealand (NZL)	57.14
400 metres hurdles	Melissa Rollison; Queensland	10:15.77	Mary Fien; New South Wales	10:28.68	Karen Murphy; New Zealand (NZL)	10:34.24
4 × 100 m relay	University of Western Australia; Western Australia (WA); Gillian Ragus; Kylie Wheeler; Susan Andrews; Jodi Lambert	46.24	Sutherland; New South Wales (NSW); Belinda Chapman; Kelly Brunton; Lauren Pearson; Sarah Mullan	48.39	Ringwood; Victoria (VIC); Janina Sliwinski; Katie Moore; Kylee Ziino; Anne Fearnley	48.95
4 × 400 m relay	University of Western Australia; Western Australia (WA); Kylie Wheeler; Hanna Ozturk; Jodi Lambert; Susan Andrews	3:42.84	Bankstown Sports; New South Wales (NSW); Lauren Poetschka; Robyn Pearson; Natalie Kolodziej; Amber Menzies	3:44.26	University of Queensland; Queensland (QLD); Katrina Sendall; Rebecca Sadler; Melissa Moss; Alice Barrett	3:45.37
High jump	Alison Inverarity; Western Australia	1.88 m	Leah Alexander; Victoria	1.84 m	Sherryl Morrow; Victoria	1.84 m
Pole vault	Tatiana Grigorieva; South Australia	4.25 m	Kym Howe; Western Australia	4.15 m	Bridgid Isworth; Victoria	4.00 m
Long jump	Eunice Barber; France (FRA)	6.74 m (+0.7 m/s)	Nicole Boegman; New South Wales	6.53 m (+1.2 m/s)	Chantal Brunner; New Zealand (NZL)	6.48 m (+0.2 m/s)
Triple jump	Carmen Miller; Tasmania	13.26 m (+0.5 m/s)	Nicole Mladenis; Western Australia	13.21 m (+0.8 m/s)	Paula Lodge; South Australia	12.91 m (-0.2 m/s)
Shot put	Tressa Thompson; United States (USA)	17.86 m	Amy Palmer; United States (USA)	16.55 m	Tania Senior; New Zealand (NZL)	15.44 m
Discus throw	Lisa-Marie Vizaniari; Queensland	61.72 m	Alison Lever; Queensland	60.92 m	Aretha Hill; United States (USA)	57.75 m
Hammer throw	Deborah Sosimenko; New South Wales	62.77 m	Karyne Perkins; New South Wales	62.59 m	Amy Palmer; United States (USA)	61.89 m
Javelin throw	Hayley Wilson; New Zealand (NZL)	47.48 m	Linda Polelei; France (FRA)	46.75 m	Jane Jamieson; New South Wales	45.10 m
Heptathlon	Sherryl Morrow; Victoria	5722 pts	Clare Thompson; Queensland	5464 pts	Virginia Young; New South Wales	5090 pts
