= 2006–07 Australian Athletics Championships =

- Dates: 9–11 March 2007
- Host city: Brisbane, Australia
- Venue: Queensland Sport and Athletics Centre
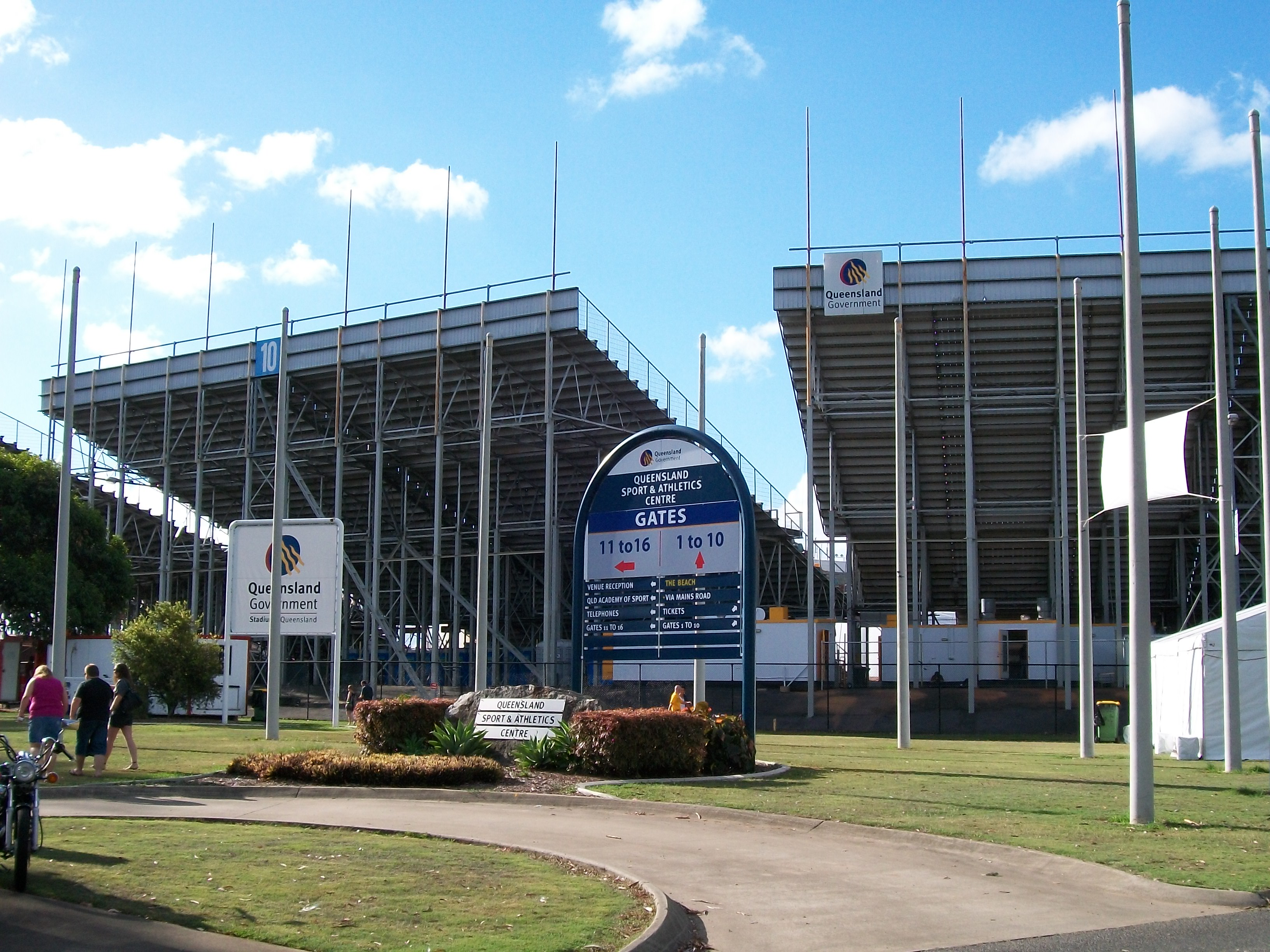

The 2006–07 Australian Athletics Championships was the 85th edition of the national championship in outdoor track and field for Australia. It was held from 9–11 March 2007 at the Queensland Sport and Athletics Centre in Brisbane. It served as a selection meeting for Australia at the 2007 World Championships in Athletics. Long-distance events took place separately: the 10,000 metres events was held at the Zatopek 10K on 14 December 2006 at Lakeside Stadium in Melbourne while the 5000 metres events were held at the Melbourne Track Classic on 2 March 2007.

== Medal summary ==
=== Men ===
Event	Gold		Silver		Bronze	
100 metres (Wind: 1.9 m/s)	Josh Ross; New South Wales	10.08	Patrick Johnson; Australian Capital Territory	10.27	Adam Miller; New South Wales	10.29
200 metres (Wind: 4.7 m/s)	Josh Ross; New South Wales	20.51	Patrick Johnson; Australian Capital Territory	20.53	James Dolphin; New Zealand (NZL)	20.71
400 metres	Sean Wroe; Victoria	45.80	Kurt Mulcahy; New South Wales	46.36	Joel Milburn; New South Wales	46.79
800 metres	Nick Bromley; New South Wales	1:48.42	Jeff Riseley; Victoria	1:48.55	Matthew Hammond; New South Wales	1:49.02
1500 metres	Mark Fountain; Victoria	3:42.31	Paul Hoffman; New South Wales	3:42.87	Jeremy Roff; New South Wales	3:42.88
3000 metres	Dickson Marwa Mkami; Tanzania (TAN)	8:00.11	Mark Tucker; New South Wales	8:01.19	Patrick Nyangelo; Tanzania (TAN)	8:01.92
5000 metres	Craig Mottram; Victoria	13:32.67	Boniface Songok; Kenya (KEN)	13:36.77	Dickson Marwa Mkami; Tanzania (TAN)	13:38.30
10,000 metres	Galen Rupp; United States (USA)	28:28.18	Bret Schoolmeester; United States (USA)	28:46.26	Lee Troop; Victoria	28:53.31
110 metres hurdles (Wind: 1.5 m/s)	Justin Merlino; New South Wales	13.55	James Mortimer; New Zealand (NZL)	13.71	Greg Eyears; New South Wales	13.72
400 metres hurdles	LaBronze Garrett; United States (USA)	50.15	Brendan Cole; Australian Capital Territory	50.78	Mowen Boino; Papua New Guinea (PNG)	51.03
3000 metres steeplechase	Peter Nowill; Queensland	8:34.95	Martin Dent; Australian Capital Territory	8:40.07	Michael Hosking; Australian Capital Territory	9:16.92
High jump	Liam Zamel-Paez; Queensland	2.21 m	Nick Moroney; New South Wales	2.18 m	Kane Brigg; Queensland	2.15 m
Pole vault	Brad Walker; United States (USA)	5.95 m	Steve Hooker; Western Australia Toby Stevenson; United States (USA)	5.50 m	Not awarded	
Long jump	Tim Parracivini; Queensland	8.01 m (+1.2 m/s)	Chris Noffke; Queensland	7.97 m (+1.3 m/s)	Frédéric Erin; France (FRA)	7.89 m (+1.0 m/s)
Triple jump	Alwyn Jones; South Australia	16.80 m (+3.8 m/s)	Michael Perry; New South Wales	16.40 m (+1.5 m/s)	Alexander Stewart; New South Wales	15.79 m (+2.3 m/s)
Shot put	Christian Cantwell; United States (USA)	19.92 m	Justin Anlezark; Queensland	18.55 m	Clay Cross; New South Wales	18.21 m
Discus throw	Benn Harradine; Victoria	60.89 m	Aaron Neighbour; Victoria	58.82 m	Graham Hicks; Tasmania	56.87 m
Hammer throw	Hiroaki Doi; Japan (JPN)	69.89 m	Pavlo Milinevskyy; Victoria	66.57 m	Darren Billett; South Australia	66.09 m
Javelin throw	Jarrod Bannister; Queensland	83.70 m	Joshua Robinson; Queensland	78.71 m	Stuart Farquhar; New Zealand (NZL)	77.33 m
Decathlon	Erik Surjan; Western Australia	7706 pts	Jarrod Sims; South Australia	7556 pts	Kyle McCarthy; Queensland	7317 pts

=== Women ===
Event	Gold		Silver		Bronze	
100 metres (Wind: 1.8 m/s)	Sally McLellan; Queensland	11.23	Mae Koime; Papua New Guinea (PNG)	11.37	Crystal Attenborough; Northern Territory	11.49
200 metres (Wind: 2.6 m/s)	Monique Williams; New Zealand (NZL)	23.28	Mae Koime; Papua New Guinea (PNG)	23.38	Melanie Kleeberg; Queensland	23.46
400 metres	Tamsyn Lewis; Victoria	51.71	Monique Williams; New Zealand (NZL)	52.74	Trisha Holz; New South Wales	53.71
800 metres	Tamsyn Lewis; Victoria	2:00.71	Madeleine Pape; Victoria	2:01.50	Zoe Buckman; Australian Capital Territory	2:03.94
1500 metres	Lisa Corrigan; Australian Capital Territory	4:15.25	Sarah Jamieson; Victoria	4:15.91	Georgie Clarke; Victoria	4:22.70
3000 metres	Lauren Fleshman; United States (USA)	9:28.53	Sonia O'Sullivan; Victoria	9:32.31	Eloise Wellings; New South Wales	9:35.88
5000 metres	Lauren Fleshman; United States (USA)	15:27.61	Benita Johnson; Victoria	15:36.45	Sonia O'Sullivan; Victoria	16:04.39
10,000 metres	Jessica Ruthe; New Zealand (NZL)	33:04.52	Lisa Jane Weightman; Victoria	33:25.90	Lauren Shelley; Western Australia	33:59.61
100 metres hurdles (Wind: 0.7 m/s)	Sally McLellan; Queensland	12.92	Fiona Cullen; Queensland	13.23	Andrea Miller; New Zealand (NZL)	13.29
400 metres hurdles	Lauren Boden; Australian Capital Territory	58.40	Lyndsay Pekin; Western Australia	59.50	Jessie Couch; Victoria	60.28
3000 metres steeplechase	Donna MacFarlane; Tasmania	9:34.21	Marnie Ponton; Australian Capital Territory	10:16.39	Sarah Grahame; Victoria	10:54.25
High jump	Ellen Pettitt; Western Australia	1.83 m	Vicki Collins; Queensland	1.80 m	Catherine Drummond; Queensland	1.80 m
Pole vault	Kym Howe; Western Australia	4.55 m	Alana Boyd; Queensland	4.35 m	Rosanna Ditton; Victoria	4.20 m
Long jump	Bronwyn Thompson; Queensland	6.63 m (+2.9 m/s)	Lauren Boden; Australian Capital Territory	6.39 m (+4.1 m/s)	Jacinta Boyd; Queensland	6.36 m (+1.8 m/s)
Triple jump	Jeanette Bowles; Victoria	13.08 m (+0.0 m/s)	Lisa Morrison; New South Wales	13.03 m (-1.2 m/s)	Emma Knight; Victoria	12.74 m (-0.7 m/s)
Shot put	Ana Po'uhila; Tonga (TGA)	16.17 m	Dani Samuels; New South Wales	16.17 m	Alifatou Djibril; South Australia	13.87 m
Discus throw	Dani Samuels; New South Wales	60.40 m	Beatrice Faumuina; New Zealand (NZL)	58.02 m	Monique Nacsa; Queensland	53.97 m
Hammer throw	Karyne Di Marco; New South Wales	61.53 m	Gabrielle Neighbour; Victoria	59.87 m	Sharyn Angel; Queensland	58.58 m
Javelin throw	Kim Mickle; Western Australia	57.24 m	Laura Cornford; New South Wales	55.64 m	Kathryn Mitchell; Victoria	53.41 m
Heptathlon	Kylie Wheeler; Western Australia	6044 pts	Sarah Cowley; New Zealand (NZL)	5547 pts	Lauren Foote; South Australia	5345 pts
