= 2009–10 Australian Athletics Championships =

- Dates: 16–18 April 2010
- Host city: Perth, Western Australia
- Venue: Western Australian Athletics Stadium
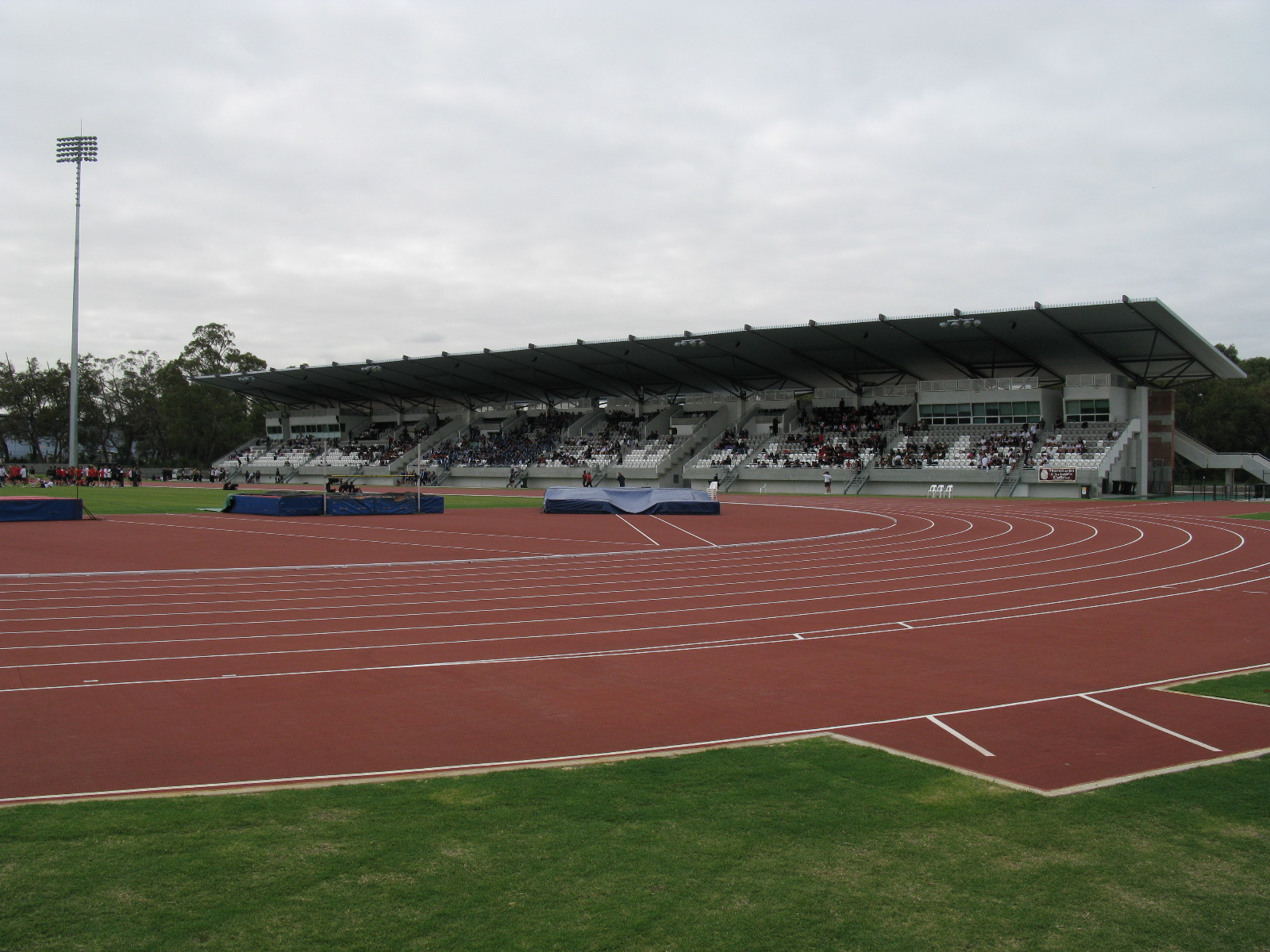

The 2009–10 Australian Athletics Championships was the 88th edition of the national championship in outdoor track and field for Australia. It was held from 16–18 April 2010 at the Western Australian Athletics Stadium in Perth. It served as a selection meeting for Australia at the 2010 Commonwealth Games. The 10,000 metres event took place separately at the Zatopek 10K on 10 December 2009 at Lakeside Stadium in Melbourne. The decathlon and heptathlon competitions were held in Hobart on 13 and 14 February 2010.

== Medal summary ==
=== Men ===
| Event | Gold | | Silver | | Bronze | |
|---|---|---|---|---|---|---|
| 100 metres (Wind: +0.4 m/s) | Aaron Rouge-Serret; Victoria | 10.32 | Matt Davies; Queensland | 10.44 | Jacob Groth; New South Wales | 10.45 |
| 200 metres (Wind: +1.4 m/s) | Patrick Johnson; Queensland | 20.78 | Aaron Rouge-Serret; Victoria | 20.82 | James Dolphin; New Zealand (NZL) | 20.83 |
| 400 metres | Ben Offereins; Western Australia | 45.17 | John Steffensen; New South Wales | 45.72 | Joel Milburn; New South Wales | 45.75 |
| 800 metres | Lachlan Renshaw; New South Wales | 1:46.66 | James Kaan; New South Wales | 1:47.04 | James Gurr; New South Wales | 1:47.16 |
| 1500 metres | Ryan Gregson; New South Wales | 3:44.99 | Jeff Riseley; Victoria | 3:45.15 | Jeremy Roff; New South Wales | 3:45.37 |
| 5000 metres | Ben St Lawrence; New South Wales | 13:40.54 | Collis Birmingham; Victoria | 13:42.61 | David McNeill; Victoria | 14:00.80 |
| 10,000 metres | Collis Birmingham; Victoria | 28:04.14 | Ben St Lawrence; New South Wales | 28:05.73 | Michael Shelley; Queensland | 28:13.13 |
| 110 metres hurdles (Wind: +2.1 m/s) | Greg Eyears; New South Wales | 13.82 w | Daniel Small; New South Wales | 13.90 w | Daniel Martin; Victoria | 13.91 w |
| 400 metres hurdles | Brendan Cole; Australian Capital Territory | 50.64 | Tristan Thomas; Tasmania | 50.69 | Danny Brandwood; New South Wales | 51.29 |
| 3000 metres steeplechase | Youcef Abdi; New South Wales | 8:36.63 | Richard Everest; South Australia | 8:41.86 | Daryl Crook; Queensland | 9:09.93 |
| High jump | Liam Zamel-Paez; Queensland | 2.22 m | Josh Hall; Queensland | 2.22 m | Hikaru Tsuchiya; Japan (JPN) | 2.19 m |
| Pole vault | Steve Hooker; Western Australia | 5.80 m | Blake Lucas; Victoria | 5.05 m | James Filshie; Victoria | 5.05 m |
| Long jump | Fabrice Lapierre; New South Wales | 8.78 m w (+3.1 m/s) | Chris Noffke; Queensland | 8.33 m (+1.2 m/s) | Robert Crowther; Queensland | 7.91 m (+1.6 m/s) |
| Triple jump | Henry Frayne; Victoria | 16.63 m (+0.2 m/s) | Kane Brigg; Queensland | 16.53 m (+0.0 m/s) | Alwyn Jones; Victoria | 15.99 m (+0.0 m/s) |
| Shot put | Scott Martin; Victoria | 19.83 m | Dale Stevenson; Victoria | 19.67 m | Chris Gaviglio; Queensland | 18.80 m |
| Discus throw | Benn Harradine; Victoria | 62.26 m | Scott Martin; Victoria | 60.25 m | Julian Wruck; Queensland | 57.48 m |
| Hammer throw | Hiroaki Doi; Japan (JPN) | 69.80 m | Hiroshi Noguchi; Japan (JPN) | 69.46 m | Simon Wardhaugh; Queensland | 69.37 m |
| Javelin throw | Jarrod Bannister; Victoria | 83.17 m | Stuart Farquhar; New Zealand (NZL) | 81.01 m | Matthew Outzen; New South Wales | 76.81 m |
| Decathlon | Stephen Cain; Victoria | 7427 pts | Kyle McCarthy; Queensland | 7331 pts | Cameron Crowley; Queensland | 6658 pts |

=== Women ===
| Event | Gold | | Silver | | Bronze | |
|---|---|---|---|---|---|---|
| 100 metres (Wind: +0.2 m/s) | Melissa Breen; Australian Capital Territory | 11.50 | Anna Smythe; New Zealand (NZL) | 11.72 | Laura Whaler; New South Wales | 11.72 |
| 200 metres (Wind: +1.3 m/s) | Jody Henry; Western Australia | 23.29 | Joanne Cuddihy; Ireland (IRL) | 23.38 | Andrea Koenen; New Zealand (NZL) | 23.67 |
| 400 metres | Joanne Cuddihy; Ireland (IRL) | 51.94 | Jody Henry; Western Australia | 52.20 | Pirrenee Steinert; New South Wales | 52.78 |
| 800 metres | Katherine Katsanevakis; Victoria | 2:04.58 | Madeleine Pape; Victoria | 2:04.82 | Trychelle Kingdom; Victoria | 2:05.50 |
| 1500 metres | Kaila McKnight; Victoria | 4:17.99 | Bridey Delaney; New South Wales | 4:18.33 | Zoe Buckman; Australian Capital Territory | 4:18.58 |
| 5000 metres | Eloise Wellings; New South Wales | 15:23.53 | Lara Tamsett; New South Wales | 15:43.57 | Tara Palm; South Australia | 15:52.36 |
| 10,000 metres | Eloise Wellings; New South Wales | 32:19.08 | Lisa Jane Weightman; Victoria | 32:20.14 | Lara Tamsett; New South Wales | 32:20.39 |
| 100 metres hurdles (Wind: +2.0 m/s) | Hayley Butler; New South Wales | 13.25 | Shannon McCann; Western Australia | 13.43 | Mami Ishino; Japan (JPN) | 13.54 |
| 400 metres hurdles | Lauren Boden; Australian Capital Territory | 55.86 | Tamsyn Lewis; Victoria | 58.08 | Lisa Spencer; New South Wales | 58.81 |
| 3000 metres steeplechase | Melissa Rollison; Queensland | 10:17.51 | Lara Nicod; New South Wales | 10:33.43 | Charlotte Wilson; New South Wales | 10:41.95 |
| High jump | Petrina Price; New South Wales | 1.90 m | Janelle O'Sullivan; Victoria | 1.80 m | Hannah Alderton; Victoria | 1.80 m |
| Pole vault | Liz Parnov; Western Australia | 4.40 m | Alana Boyd; Western Australia | 4.40 m | Amanda Bisk; Western Australia | 4.20 m |
| Long jump | Jessica Penney; Australian Capital Territory | 6.18 m (+0.0 m/s) | Kerrie Perkins; Australian Capital Territory | 6.14 m (-0.5 m/s) | Corinna Minko; Victoria | 6.07 m (+1.4 m/s) |
| Triple jump | Meggan O'Riley; Victoria | 13.26 m (+0.0 m/s) | Emma Knight; Victoria | 13.22 m (+0.0 m/s) | Lisa Morrison; New South Wales | 13.12 m (+0.0 m/s) |
| Shot put | Joanne Mirtschin; Australian Capital Territory | 15.64 m | Kim Mulhall; Victoria | 15.08 m | Margaret Satupai; Victoria | 14.90 m |
| Discus throw | Dani Samuels; New South Wales | 63.61 m | Calista Lyon; Victoria | 54.25 m | Kim Mulhall; Victoria | 52.51 m |
| Hammer throw | Gabrielle Neighbour; Victoria | 64.80 m | Bronwyn Eagles; New South Wales | 63.74 m | Karyne Di Marco; New South Wales | 63.13 m |
| Javelin throw | Kim Mickle; Western Australia | 60.66 m | Kathryn Mitchell; Victoria | 56.15 m | Karen Clarke; New South Wales | 51.80 m |
| Heptathlon | Rebecca Robinson; Queensland | 5234 pts | Shayleigh Gould; Queensland | 5026 pts | Larna Dieckmann; Queensland | 4843 pts |
