= Australian Athletics Championships =

Annual track and field event in Australia

The Australian Athletics Championships or Australian Open Track and Field Championships are held annually to determine Australia's champion athletes in a range of athletics events. The championships are the primary qualification trial for athletes wishing to compete at the Olympic Games, Commonwealth Games or World Championships. The event is conducted by Australian Athletics.

The 2023 Australian Championships were the 100th edition of the event, which dates back to 1890 for men, and 1931 for women. The championships have been held in all states of Australia, with the Queensland Sport & Athletics Centre being the venue that has held the most editions of the event (12).

Initially, men’s and women’s events were held separately, in different places, until the Olympic selections of 1972 and 1976, and as a single event since 1978.

The championships are considered open: athletes from other countries such as New Zealand and the USA have competed in and won events.

== History ==
The championships were first held on 31 May 1890 under the name Inter Colonial Meet at Moore Park in Sydney.

In 1893, teams from the Australasian colonies of New South Wales, Victoria, Tasmania, Queensland and New Zealand competed in the first formalised Australasian Athletics Championships meeting.

A New Zealand team continued to compete in this event until the 1927/28 event. At the next championships in 1929/30, women's events were included for the first time.

In 1933, the women began conducting their own championships, with a wider range of events. Except for occasional combined championships in 1936, 1972 and 1976, the separation of men's and women's championships continued until the 1977/78 event.

== Championship events ==
The full range of Olympic events is not usually conducted at the national championships. For example, during the 2007/08 season the following championship events were held separately:

- Men's and Women's 10,000 metres – Zatopek Classic – 13 December 2007
- Men's 50 kilometres race walk – Melbourne – 16 December 2007
- Women's 5000 metres – Sydney Grand Prix – 16 February 2008
- Men's 5000 metres – IAAF World Athletics Tour, Melbourne meet – 21 February 2008
- Men's and Women's 20 kilometres race walk – Melbourne – 23 February 2008

== Most successful athletes ==
The most successful athletes at the Championships have been throwers Gael Martin and Warwick Selvey who won 20 and 19 championships events, respectively.

== List of championships ==
Year	Venue	Place
1890–91	Moore Park	Sydney
1893–94	Melbourne Cricket Ground	Melbourne
1895–96	Lancaster Park (Note: held in New Zealand as part of the Australasian Athletics Championships)	Christchurch
1897–98	Sydney Cricket Ground	Sydney
1899–00	Bowen Park	Brisbane
1901–02	Auckland Domain	Auckland
1903–04	Melbourne Cricket Ground	Melbourne
1905–06	Sydney Cricket Ground	Sydney
1907–08	TCA Ground	Hobart
1909–10	Bowen Park	Brisbane
1911–12	Basin Reserve	Wellington
1913–14	Amateur Sports Ground	Melbourne
1919–20	Sydney Sports Ground	Sydney
1921–22	Adelaide Oval	Adelaide
1923–24	North Hobart Oval	Hobart
1925–26	Bowen Park	Brisbane
1927–28	Basin Reserve	Wellington
1929–30	Melbourne Cricket Ground	Melbourne
1931–32	Sydney Cricket Ground	Sydney
1932–33	Amateur Sports Ground (Note: women's championship only)	Melbourne
1933–34	Adelaide Oval (Note: men's championship only)	Adelaide
1934–35	Lang Park	Brisbane
1935–36	North Hobart Oval	Hobart
1935–36	Rushcutters Bay Oval	Sydney
1937–38	Bowen Park	Brisbane
1937–38	Royal Park	Melbourne
1939–40	Leederville Oval	Perth
1946–47	Leederville Oval	Perth
1947–48	St. Kilda Cricket Ground	Melbourne
1947–48	University Oval	Sydney
1948–49	Sydney Cricket Ground	Sydney
1949–50	Adelaide Oval	Adelaide
1949–50	Norwood Oval	Adelaide
1950–51	North Hobart Oval	Hobart
1951–52	Exhibition Grounds	Brisbane
1951–52	Olympic Park	Melbourne
1952–53	Leederville Oval	Perth
1953–54	Sydney Cricket Ground	Sydney
1953–54	Leederville Oval	Perth
1954–55	Kensington Oval	Adelaide
1955–56	Olympic Park	Melbourne
1955–56	Brisbane Cricket Ground	Brisbane
1956–57	Olympic Park	Melbourne
1957–58	Exhibition Grounds	Brisbane
1957–58	Sydney Sports Ground	Sydney
1958–59	North Hobart Oval	Hobart
1959–60	Leederville Oval	Perth
1959–60	North Hobart Oval	Hobart
1960–61	Lang Park	Brisbane
1961–62	ES Marks Athletics Field	Sydney
1961–62	West Parkland Field	Adelaide
1962–63	Thebarton Oval	Adelaide
1962–63	Lang Park	Brisbane
1963–64	Olympic Park	Melbourne
1963–64	Royal Park	Melbourne
1964–65	North Hobart Oval	Hobart
1964–65	Perry Lakes Stadium	Perth
1965–66	Perry Lakes Stadium	Perth
1965–66	Sydney Sports Ground	Sydney
1966–67	Olympic Sports Field	Adelaide
1966–67	North Hobart Oval	Hobart
1967–68	ES Marks Athletics Field	Sydney
1967–68	Olympic Sports Field	Adelaide
1968–69	Olympic Park	Melbourne
1968–69	Lang Park	Brisbane
1969–70	Olympic Sports Field	Adelaide
1969–70	Royal Park	Melbourne
1970–71	Lang Park	Brisbane
1970–71	Sydney Sports Ground	Sydney
1971–72	Perry Lakes Stadium	Perth
1972–73	ES Marks Athletics Field	Sydney
1972–73	North Hobart Oval	Hobart
1973–74	Olympic Park	Melbourne
1973–74	Olympic Sports Field	Adelaide
1974–75	Olympic Sports Field	Adelaide
1974–75	Lang Park	Brisbane
1975–76	Olympic Park	Melbourne
1976–77	The Domain	Sydney
1976–77	Sydney Sports Ground	Sydney
1977–78	QE II Stadium	Brisbane
1978–79	Perry Lakes Stadium	Perth
1979–80	ES Marks Athletics Field	Sydney
1980–81	Olympic Sports Field	Adelaide
1981–82	QE II Stadium	Brisbane
1982–83	Olympic Park	Melbourne
1983–84	Olympic Park	Melbourne
1984–85	Bruce Stadium	Canberra
1985–86	Olympic Sports Field	Adelaide
1986–87	ES Marks Athletics Field	Sydney
1987–88	Perry Lakes Stadium	Perth
1988–89	QE II Stadium	Brisbane
1989–90	Olympic Park	Melbourne
1990–91	ES Marks Athletics Field	Sydney
1991–92	Olympic Sports Field	Adelaide
1992–93	QE II Stadium	Brisbane
1993–94	ES Marks Athletics Field	Sydney
1994–95	ES Marks Athletics Field	Sydney
1995–96	ES Marks Athletics Field	Sydney
1996–97	Olympic Park	Melbourne
1997–98	Olympic Park	Melbourne
1998–99	Olympic Park	Melbourne
1999–00	Stadium Australia	Sydney
2000–01	QE II Stadium	Brisbane
2001–02	ANZ Stadium	Brisbane
2002–03	ANZ Stadium	Brisbane
2003–04	Sydney Olympic Park	Sydney
2004–05	Sydney Olympic Park	Sydney
2005–06	Sydney Olympic Park	Sydney
2006–07	Queensland Sport and Athletics Centre	Brisbane
2007–08	Queensland Sport and Athletics Centre	Brisbane
2008–09	Queensland Sport and Athletics Centre	Brisbane
2009–10	Western Australian Athletics Stadium	Perth
2010–11	Olympic Park	Melbourne
2011–12	Lakeside Stadium	Melbourne
2012–13	Sydney Olympic Park	Sydney
2013–14	Albert Park	Melbourne
2014–15	Queensland Sport and Athletics Centre	Brisbane
2015–16	Sydney Olympic Park	Sydney
2016–17	Sydney Olympic Park	Sydney
2017–18	Carrara Stadium	Gold Coast
2018–19	Sydney Olympic Park	Sydney
2019–20	Main championships not held (Note: The main championships were not held but eight events were completed prior to the cancellation.)	
2020–21	Sydney Olympic Park	Sydney
2021–22	Sydney Olympic Park	Sydney
2022–23	Queensland Sport and Athletics Centre	Brisbane
2023–24	SA Athletics Stadium	Adelaide
2024–25	Western Australian Athletics Stadium	Perth
2025–26	Sydney Olympic Park Athletic Centre	Sydney

== Championships records ==
=== Men ===
Event	Record	Athlete/Team	Date	Meet	Place	Ref.
100 m	9.96 (+0.2 m/s)	Lachlan Kennedy	10 April 2026	2025–26 Championships	Sydney	
100 m	9.96 (+0.5 m/s)	Lachlan Kennedy	11 April 2026	2025–26 Championships	Sydney	
200 m	19.67 (+1.7 m/s) AR	Gout Gout	12 April 2026	2025–26 Championships	Sydney	
800 m	1:43.79 NR	Peter Bol	13 April 2025	2024–25 Championships	Perth	
Discus throw	69.35 m NR	Matthew Denny	13 April 2024	2023–24 Championships	Adelaide	

=== Women ===
Event	Record	Athlete/Team	Date	Meet	Place	Ref.
800 m	1:58.32	Catriona Bisset	30 March 2023	2022–23 Championships	Brisbane	
1500 m	4:04.19	Jessica Hull	1 April 2023	2022–23 Championships	Brisbane	
5000 m	15:05.87	Jessica Hull	2 April 2023	2022–23 Championships	Brisbane	
High jump	2.00 m NR	Nicola McDermott	18 April 2021	2020–21 Championships	Sydney	
Pole vault	4.75 m	Eliza McCartney	1 April 2023	2022–23 Championships	Brisbane	
