= 2008–09 Australian Athletics Championships =

- Dates: 19–21 March 2009
- Host city: Brisbane, Australia
- Venue: Queensland Sport and Athletics Centre
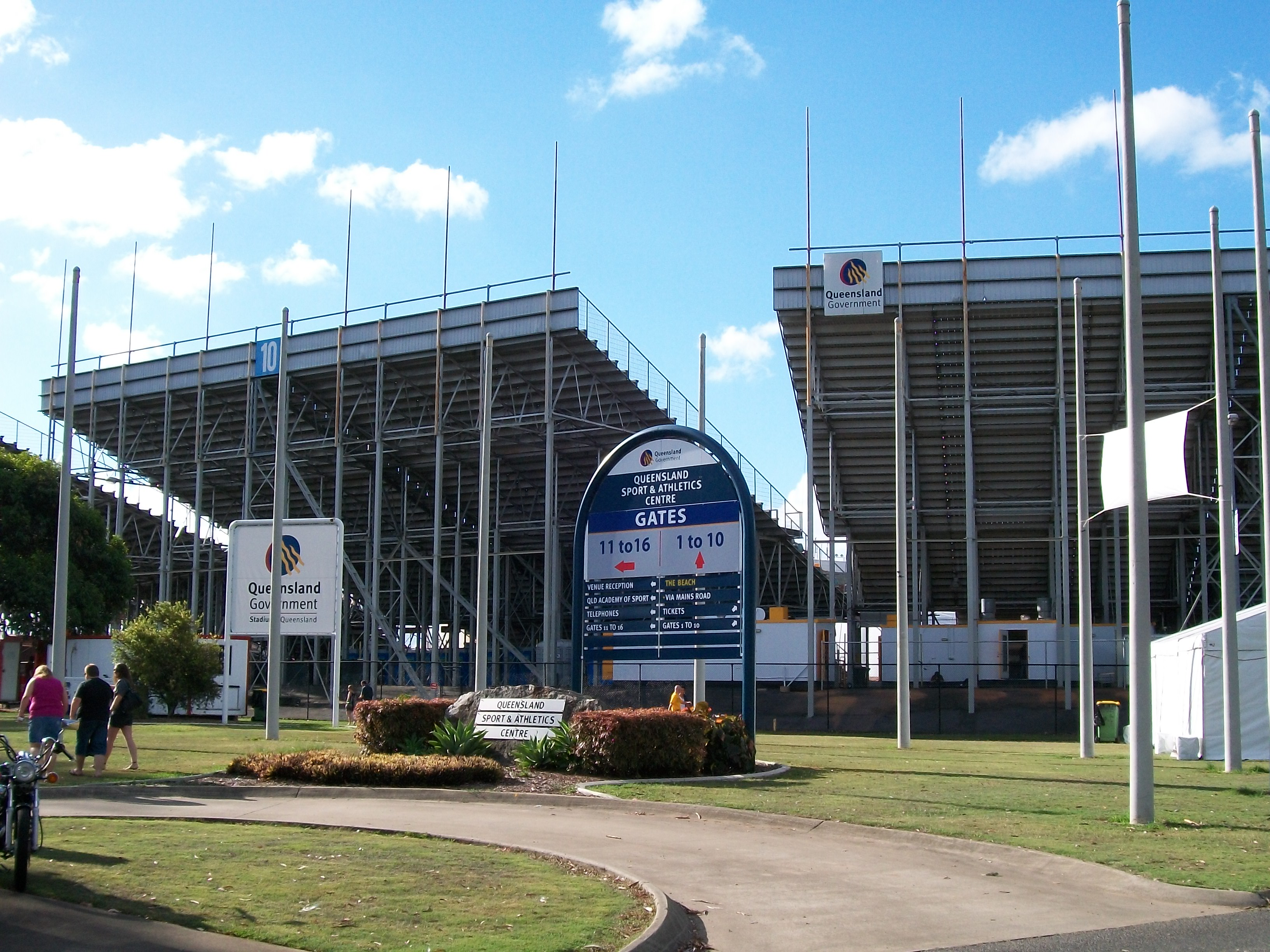

The 2008–09 Australian Athletics Championships was the 87th edition of the national championship in outdoor track and field for Australia. It was held from 19–21 March 2009 at the Queensland Sport and Athletics Centre in Brisbane. It served as a selection meeting for Australia at the 2009 World Championships in Athletics.

Some long-distance events were staged separately. The 10,000 metres event took place at the Zatopek 10K on 11 December 2008 at Lakeside Stadium in Melbourne, the men's 5000 metres was contested at the Melbourne Track Classic on 5 March 2009 at the Olympic Park Stadium in Melbourne and the women's 5000 metres was held at the Sydney Track Classic on 28 February 2009 at the Sydney Olympic Park Athletic Centre in Sydney.

== Medal summary ==
=== Men ===
Event	Gold		Silver		Bronze	
100 metres (Wind: -0.4 m/s)	Josh Ross; Victoria	10.34	Aaron Rouge-Serret; Victoria	10.36	David Ambler; New Zealand (NZL)	10.41
200 metres (Wind: -2.0 m/s)	Aaron Rouge-Serret; Victoria	20.95	Matt Davies; Queensland	21.17	Josh Ross; Victoria	21.17
400 metres	Sean Wroe; Victoria	45.07	John Steffensen; New South Wales	45.51	Kurt Mulcahy; New South Wales	46.33
800 metres	Nicholas Bromley; New South Wales	1:47.76	Lachlan Renshaw; New South Wales	1:48.17	Werner Botha; Queensland	1:48.24
1500 metres	Jeff Riseley; Victoria	3:35.71	Jeremy Roff; New South Wales	3:37.62	Craig Huffer; Victoria	3:41.67
5000 metres	Collis Birmingham; Australia (AUS)	13:16.26	Andrew Baddeley; Great Britain (GBR)	13:20.99	Bernard Kiplagat; Kenya (KEN)	13:25.64
10,000 metres	David McNeill; Victoria	28:03.02	Bobby Curtis; United States (USA)	28:06.74	Michael Shelley; Queensland	28:08.96
110 metres hurdles (Wind: -0.6 m/s)	Tasuku Tanonaka; Japan (JPN)	13.92	Justin Merlino; New South Wales	13.95	John Burstow; Queensland	14.15
400 metres hurdles	Tristan Thomas; Tasmania	49.26	Brendan Cole; Australian Capital Territory	50.11	Dane Richter; Western Australia	51.35
3000 metres steeplechase	Youcef Abdi; New South Wales	8:38.65	Peter Nowill; Queensland	8:40.91	Matthew Johnsen; Victoria	9:00.98
High jump	Liam Zamel-Paez; Queensland	2.23 m	Chris Armet; Victoria	2.20 m	Naoyuki Daigo; Japan (JPN)	2.20 m
Pole vault	Blake Lucas; Victoria	5.45 m	Joel Pocklington; Victoria	5.20 m	Matt Boyd; Queensland	4.90 m
Long jump	Fabrice Lapierre; New South Wales	8.29 m (+0.8 m/s)	Mitchell Watt; Queensland	8.10 m (+3.6 m/s)	Chris Noffke; Queensland	8.00 m (+1.3 m/s)
Triple jump	Alwyn Jones; Victoria	16.83 m (+0.8 m/s)	Joshua Lumley; Queensland	15.84 m (+0.1 m/s)	Tomas Cholensky; New South Wales	15.67 m (+1.1 m/s)
Shot put	Justin Anlezark; Queensland	20.03 m	Dale Stevenson; Victoria	17.59 m	Stuart Gyngell; New South Wales	17.29 m
Discus throw	Bertrand Vili; France (FRA)	61.81 m	Scott Martin; Victoria	59.10 m	Aaron Neighbour; Victoria	55.98 m
Hammer throw	Mark Dickson; New South Wales	64.71 m	Tim Driesen; Victoria	64.63 m	Darren Billett; South Australia	64.35 m
Javelin throw	Stuart Farquhar; New Zealand (NZL)	80.16 m	Park Jae-Myung; South Korea (KOR)	78.34 m	Benjamin Baker; New South Wales	77.13 m
Decathlon	Brent Newdick; New Zealand (NZL)	7618 pts	Stephen Cain; Victoria	7137 pts	Aaron Page; Victoria	6415 pts

=== Women ===
Event	Gold		Silver		Bronze	
100 metres (Wind: -0.1 m/s)	Sally McLellan; Queensland	11.32	Melissa Breen; Australian Capital Territory	11.61	Alicia Wrench-Doody; South Australia	11.77
200 metres (Wind: +0.0 m/s)	Monique Williams; New Zealand (NZL)	23.74	Melissa Breen; Australian Capital Territory	23.96	Alicia Wrench-Doody; South Australia	24.33
400 metres	Tamsyn Lewis; Victoria	51.42	Monique Williams; New Zealand (NZL)	51.88	Madeleine Pape; Victoria	53.08
800 metres	Madeleine Pape; Victoria	2:02.57	Nikki Hamblin; New Zealand (NZL)	2:03.23	Katherine Katsanevakis; Victoria	2:05.91
1500 metres	Sarah Jamieson; Victoria	4:16.15	Kaila McKnight; Victoria	4:16.27	Bridey Delaney; New South Wales	4:16.58
1500 metres	Melanie Daniels; Tasmania	9:34.76	Lauren McKillop; New South Wales	9:40.99	Narelle Coady; Victoria	9:46.85
5000 metres	Sarah Jamieson; Victoria	15:54.64	Lisa Jane Weightman; Victoria	15:58.92	Donna MacFarlane; Tasmania	16:00.43
10,000 metres	Lara Tamsett; New South Wales	32:56.19	Cassie Fien; Queensland	34:34.16	Belinda Wimmer; New Zealand (NZL)	35:17.16
100 metres hurdles (Wind: -1.3 m/s)	Sally McLellan; Queensland	12.74	Mami Ishino; Japan (JPN)	13.73	Veronica Torr; New Zealand (NZL)	13.99
400 metres hurdles	Tamsyn Lewis; Victoria	56.27	Lauren Boden; Australian Capital Territory	56.33	Lyndsay Pekin; Western Australia	59.70
3000 metres steeplechase	Donna MacFarlane; Tasmania	9:57.14	Ashlea Gilfillan; Queensland	10:33.50	Andrea Ilakovac; Australian Capital Territory	11:00.60
High jump	Petrina Price; New South Wales	1.87 m	Ellen Pettitt; Western Australia	1.84 m	Catherine Drummond; Queensland	1.78 m
Pole vault	Alana Boyd; Queensland	4.35 m	Amanda Bisk; Western Australia	4.20 m	Vicky Parnov; Western Australia	4.05 m
Long jump	Jacinta Boyd; Queensland	6.40 m (+0.7 m/s)	Larissa Perry; Western Australia	6.12 m (+0.1 m/s)	Stephanie Lockhart; Victoria	5.98 m (+0.9 m/s)
Triple jump	Linda Allen; Queensland	13.48 m (+2.5 m/s)	Fumiyo Yoshida; Japan (JPN)	13.02 m (+1.3 m/s)	Marissa Pritchard; New Zealand (NZL)	12.79 m (+1.7 m/s)
Shot put	Valerie Vili; New Zealand (NZL)	20.22 m	Ana Pouhila; Tonga (TGA)	16.94 m	Dani Samuels; New South Wales	16.30 m
Discus throw	Dani Samuels; New South Wales	60.05 m	Kim Mulhall; Victoria	52.18 m	Alifatou Djibril; South Australia	49.63 m
Hammer throw	Bronwyn Eagles; New South Wales	61.75 m	Karyne Di Marco; New South Wales	61.70 m	Gabrielle Neighbour; Victoria	60.89 m
Javelin throw	Kim Mickle; Western Australia	60.69 m	Laura Cornford; New South Wales	55.88 m	Gim Gyeong-ae; South Korea (KOR)	53.02 m
Heptathlon	Lauren Foote; South Australia	5697 pts	Sarah Cowley; New Zealand (NZL)	5609 pts	Rebecca Robinson; Queensland	5136 pts
