= 2004–05 Australian Athletics Championships =

- Dates: 4–6 March 2005
- Host city: Sydney, Australia
- Venue: Sydney Olympic Park Athletic Centre
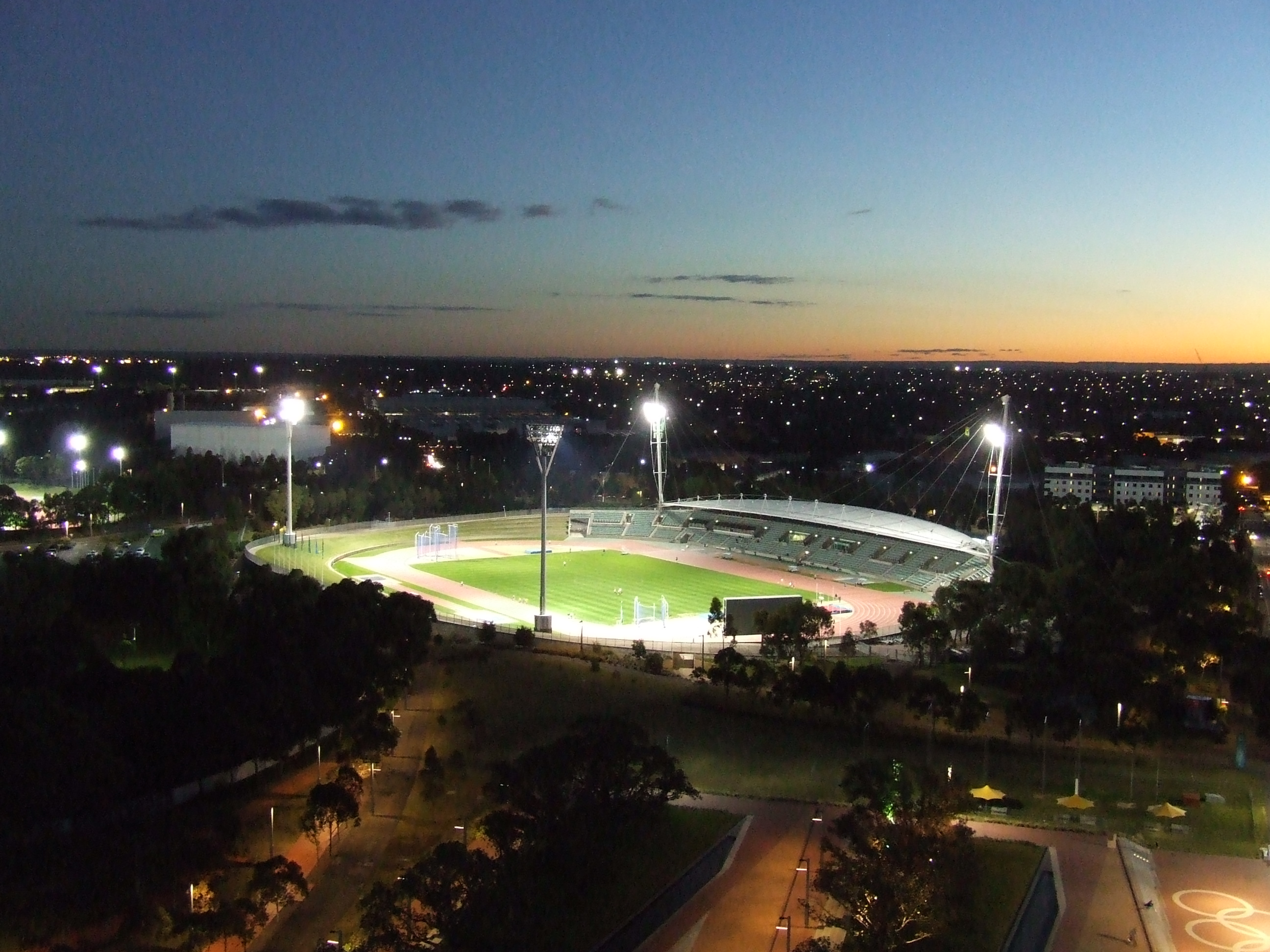

The 2004–05 Australian Athletics Championships was the 83rd edition of the national championship in outdoor track and field for Australia. It was held from 4–6 March 2005 at the Sydney Olympic Park Athletic Centre in Sydney. It served as a selection meeting for Australia at the 2005 World Championships in Athletics. The 10,000 metres event took place separately at the Zatopek 10K on 4 December 2004 at Lakeside Stadium in Melbourne. Relay events were contested in Canberra on 6 February 2005.

== Medal summary ==
=== Men ===
Event	Gold		Silver		Bronze	
100 metres (Wind: +0.5 m/s)	Josh Ross; New South Wales	10.22	Patrick Johnson; Australian Capital Territory	10.44	Ambrose Ezenwa; New South Wales	10.45
200 metres (Wind: -0.2 m/s)	Daniel Batman; New South Wales	20.76	Ambrose Ezenwa; New South Wales	20.84	Josh Ross; New South Wales	21.00
400 metres	Ben Offereins; Western Australia	46.37	John Steffensen; Western Australia	46.51	David Geddes; New South Wales	46.57
800 metres	Nick Bromley; New South Wales	1:48.09	Michael Barwick; New South Wales	1:48.91	Werner Botha; Queensland	1:49.49
1500 metres	Lachlan Chisholm; New South Wales	3:45.18	Mark Tucker; Victoria	3:45.55	Jeremy Roff; New South Wales	3:45.68
5000 metres	Craig Mottram; Victoria	14:01.38	Richard Jeremiah; Victoria	14:09.48	David Ruschena; Victoria	14:11.41
10,000 metres	David Ruschena; Victoria	28:59.55	Mark Tucker; Victoria	29:01.79	Scott Westcott; Australian Capital Territory	29:05.78
110 metres hurdles (Wind: -0.3 m/s)	James Mortimer; New Zealand (NZL)	14.04	Gregory Eyears; New South Wales	14.39	Mohamad Zeed; Victoria	14.47
400 metres hurdles	Nic O'Brien; New Zealand (NZL)	50.64	Brendan Cole; New South Wales	51.29	Tristan Thomas; Tasmania	51.94
3000 metres steeplechase	Peter Nowill; Queensland	8:30.16	Richard Jeremiah; Victoria	8:35.73	Youcef Abdi; New South Wales	8:37.42
High jump	Nicholas Moroney; New South Wales	2.20 m	Dan O'Connell; Queensland	2.12 m	Kane Brigg; Queensland	2.09 m
Pole vault	Paul Burgess; Western Australia	5.60 m	Steve Hooker; Victoria	5.50 m	Dmitri Markov; South Australia	5.50 m
Long jump	Chris Noffke; Queensland	8.00 m (+2.2 m/s)	John Thornell; New South Wales	7.93 m (-0.3 m/s)	Timothy Parravicini; Queensland	7.92 m (+0.1 m/s)
Triple jump	Michael Perry; New South Wales	16.60 m (+2.7 m/s)	Andrew Murphy; New South Wales	16.43 m (-0.1 m/s)	Alwyn Jones; South Australia	16.17 m (-0.8 m/s)
Shot put	Clay Cross; New South Wales	18.78 m	Scott Martin; Victoria	18.65 m	Rhys Jones; Queensland	18.43 m
Discus throw	Scott Martin; Victoria	59.20 m	Graham Hicks; Tasmania	57.99 m	Tim Driesen; Victoria	57.55 m
Hammer throw	Stuart Rendell; Australian Capital Territory	74.35 m	Hiroaki Doi; Japan (JPN)	67.58 m	Darren Billett; South Australia	64.21 m
Javelin throw	Oliver Dziubak; Western Australia	77.39 m	Benjamin Baker; New South Wales	68.47 m	Daniel Kratzmann; Queensland	67.57 m
Decathlon	Erik Surjan; Western Australia	7621 pts	Matthew McEwen; Queensland	7363 pts	Richard Allan; Queensland	7214 pts
4 × 100 m relay	North Launceston Athletic Club A Tasmania (TAS); Thomas Pfundt; Luke Vaessen; Joe Edgley; Patrick Coleman	45.83	Veterans Athletic Club; Australian Capital Territory (ACT); Leo Kennedy; Ken Gordon; Kevin Matthews; Michael Rutter	47.20	North Launceston Athletic Club B Tasmania (TAS); Josh Shepherd; Callam James; Steven Goldfinch; Alex Stewart	DQ
4 × 200 m relay	Box Hill Athletic Club; Victoria (VIC); Dave Featherston; Lane Harrison; Mohamad Zeed; Marty Duke	1:26.52	North Launceston Athletic Club A Tasmania (TAS); Joe Edgley; Patrick Coleman; Thomas Pfundt; Alex Stewart	1:35.95	Veterans Athletic Club; Australian Capital Territory (ACT); Leo Kennedy; Ken Gordon; Kevin Matthews; Michael Rutter	1:37.22
4 × 400 m relay	Box Hill Athletic Club; Victoria (VIC); Lane Harrison; Lachlan Aspinall; Liam Rourke; Marty Duke	3:21.26	Tea Tree Gully Athletics Club; South Australia (SA); Kostia Khudoshin; Ashley Duncan; Phillip Hargans; Russel Church	3:45.99	Veterans Athletic Club; Australian Capital Territory (ACT); Ken Gordon; Kevin Matthews; Michael Rutter; Colin Farlow	DQ
4 × 800 m relay	Sydney University; New South Wales (NSW); Mark Abercromby; Nic Bromley; Tom Richardson; Frazer Dowling	7:32.62	Eureka Athletics Club; Victoria (VIC); Cory Prout; Matthew Griffin; Collis Birmingham; Mark Cornish	7:35.16	Only two teams	
1600 medley relay (200 m, 200 m, 400 m, 800 m)	North Launceston Athletic Club A Tasmania (TAS); Thomas Pfundt; Patrick Coleman; Joe Edgley; Will Clarke	3:38.37	Tea Tree Gully Athletics Club; South Australia (SA); Robbie James; Matt Northway; Kostia Khudoshin; James Boden	3:41.76	North Launceston Athletic Club B Tasmania (TAS); Josh Shepherd; Alex Stewart; Callam James; Steven Goldfinch	4:22.67

=== Women ===
Event	Gold		Silver		Bronze	
100 metres (Wind: +0.0 m/s)	Sally McLellan; Queensland	11.77	Fiona Cullen; Queensland	11.78	Melissa Kay; Tasmania	11.80
200 metres (Wind: -1.3 m/s)	Lauren Hewitt; Victoria	23.55	Gemma Bright; Queensland	24.19	Melissa Kay; Tasmania	24.31
400 metres	Tamsyn Lewis; Victoria	52.44	Caitlin Willis; Queensland	53.00	Renee Robson; Victoria	53.86
800 metres	Katherine Katsanevakis; Victoria	2:04.72	Libby Allen; Victoria	2:05.61	Meike Flore; New South Wales	2:05.94
1500 metres	Sarah Jamieson; Victoria	4:09.42	Georgie Clarke; Victoria	4:10.57	Suzy Walsham; New South Wales	4:13.19
5000 metres	Benita Johnson; Victoria	15:46.53	Sarah Salmon; Australian Capital Territory	15:54.99	Jessica Ruthe; New Zealand (NZL)	16:06.66
10,000 metres	Haley McGregor; Victoria	32:41.10	Anna Thompson; Victoria	32:48.07	Tiffany Levette; New South Wales	33:39.87
100 metres hurdles (Wind: +0.7 m/s)	Sally McLellan; Queensland	13.41	Fiona Cullen; Queensland	13.41	Hayley Cameron; New South Wales	13.77
400 metres hurdles	Lauren Boden; Australian Capital Territory	58.59	Lauren Jauncey; Victoria	58.92	Emily Allen; Victoria	60.23
3000 metres steeplechase	Kristy Villis; South Australia	10:27.23	Marnie Ponton; Australian Capital Territory	10:38.71	Rebecca Forlong; Victoria	10:39.67
High jump	Sophia Begg; New South Wales	1.86 m	Angela McKee; New Zealand (NZL)	1.83 m	Miyuki Aoyama; Japan (JPN)	1.80 m
Pole vault	Melina Hamilton; New Zealand (NZL)	4.25 m	Katrina Miroshnichenko; Queensland	4.10 m	Irie Hill; Victoria	4.05 m
Long jump	Kerrie Taurima; Australian Capital Territory	6.59 m (+3.1 m/s)	Chantal Brunner; New Zealand (NZL)	6.52 m (+2.5 m/s)	Lisa Morrison; Victoria	6.23 m (+1.6 m/s)
Triple jump	Jeanette Bowles; Victoria	12.81 m (-4.3 m/s)	Fumiyo Yoshida; Japan (JPN)	12.53 m (-1.0 m/s)	Paula Lodge; South Australia	12.41 m (+0.3 m/s)
Shot put	Valerie Vili; New Zealand (NZL)	19.00 m	ʻAna Poʻuhila; Tonga (TGA)	16.21 m	Alifatou Djibril; South Australia	15.72 m
Discus throw	Beatrice Faumuina; New Zealand (NZL)	60.79 m	Dani Samuels; New South Wales	55.78 m	Alifatou Djibril; South Australia	54.03 m
Hammer throw	Bronwyn Eagles; New South Wales	65.43 m	Karyne Di Marco; New South Wales	64.35 m	Gabrielle Neighbour; Victoria	59.76 m
Javelin throw	Kim Mickle; Western Australia	55.91 m	Kathryn Mitchell; Victoria	52.10 m	Annabel Thomson; New South Wales	51.83 m
Heptathlon	Kylie Wheeler; Western Australia	5974 pts	Gillian Ragus; New South Wales	5531 pts	Rebecca Wardell; New Zealand (NZL)	5383 pts
4 × 100 m relay	North West Athletic Club; Tasmania (TAS); Tamika Johnston; Melissa Kay; Morgan Whiley; Madelin Poke	46.50	Hills Districts Athletics Club; New South Wales (NSW); Caitlin Stanley; Lynette Viney; Michelle Apostolou; Andrea Sparrow	48.66	UTS Northern Suburbs; New South Wales (NSW); Min Jenkins; Elizabeth Jenkins; Sandra Gabrael; Melissa Medlicott	49.45
4 × 200 m relay	North West Athletic Club; Tasmania (TAS); Tamika Johnston; Melissa Kay; Morgan Whiley; Madelin Poke	1:38.24	UTS Northern Suburbs; New South Wales (NSW); Min Jenkins; Melissa Medlicott; Elizabeth Jenkins; Sandra Gabrael	1:44.89	North Launceston Athletic Club A Tasmania (TAS); Lauren Harper; Francis Cameron; Olivia Cameron; Olivia Scott	1:51.29
4 × 400 m relay	Hills Districts Athletics Club A New South Wales (NSW); Caitlin Stanley; Holly Noack; Lynette Viney; Nikki Donnelly	3:57.13	Hills Districts Athletics Club B New South Wales (NSW); Nicolette Smith; Ruth Vogelsang; Jessica Trengove; Cherie Rothery	4:09.52	Queanbeyan Cooma; Australian Capital Territory (ACT); Hayley Wortley; Emily Glover; Andrea Ilakovac; Zoe Buckman	DQ
1600 medley relay (200 m, 200 m, 400 m, 800 m)	Hills Districts Athletics Club; New South Wales (NSW); Andrea Sparrow; Caitlin Stanley; Lisa Davis; Jane Mudge	4:14.74	North Launceston Athletic Club A Tasmania (TAS); Megan Dunn; Olivia Scott; Rebecca Roach; Madeline Oldfield	4:27.94	North Launceston Athletic Club B Tasmania (TAS); Leah Cooper; Lauren Vaessen; Laura Bennett; Madeline Weedon	5:00.06
