= 2010–11 Australian Athletics Championships =

- Dates: 15–17 April 2011
- Host city: Melbourne, Australia
- Venue: Olympic Park Stadium
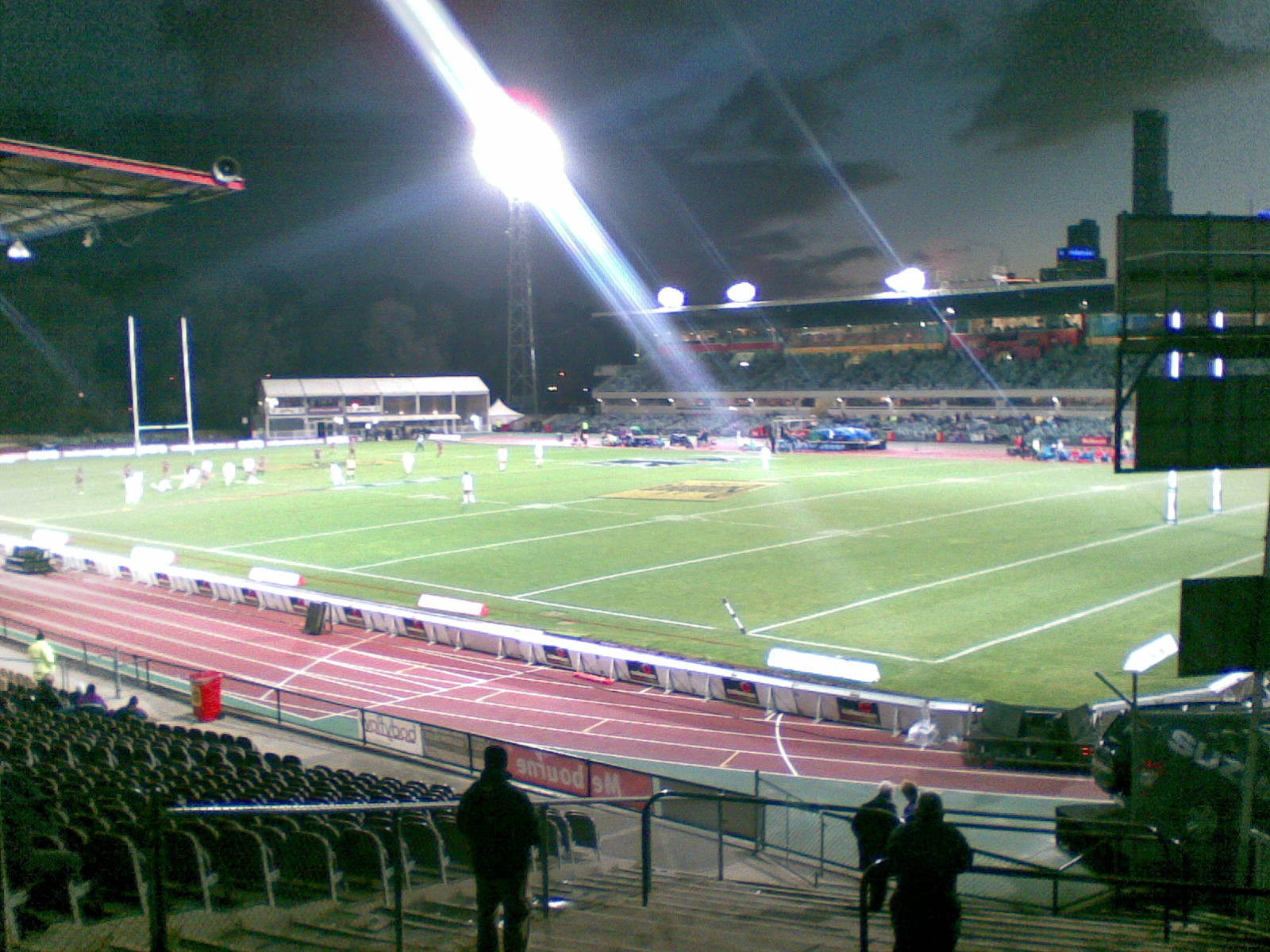

The 2010–11 Australian Athletics Championships was the 89th edition of the national championship in outdoor track and field for Australia. It was held from 15–17 April 2011 at the Olympic Park Stadium in Melbourne. It served as a selection meeting for Australia at the 2011 World Championships in Athletics. This was the last competition to be held at the stadium before its demolition.

Several events were contested at different times and venues. The 10,000 metres event took place at the Zatopek 10K on 9 December 2010 at Lakeside Stadium in Melbourne, the decathlon and heptathlon were held in Perth on 31 March and 1 April 2011, the men's 5000 metres took place at the Melbourne Track Classic on 3 March 2011 and the women's 5000 metres was held as part of the Victorian Championships on 5 March 2011.

== Medal summary ==
=== Men ===
Event	Gold		Silver		Bronze	
100 metres (Wind: -0.6 m/s)	Aaron Rouge-Serret; Victoria	10.39	Anthony Alozie; New South Wales	10.58	Isaac Ntiamoah; New South Wales	10.63
200 metres (Wind: -1.2 m/s)	Aaron Rouge-Serret; Victoria	20.88	Matt Davies; Queensland	21.08	Mangar Chuot; Western Australia	21.39
400 metres	Steven Solomon; New South Wales	45.58	Ben Offereins; Western Australia	45.88	John Steffensen; New South Wales	46.41
800 metres	James Kaan; New South Wales	1:47.48	Lachlan Renshaw; New South Wales	1:47.88	Johnny Rayner; Victoria	1:47.98
1500 metres	Jeff Riseley; Victoria	3:39.21	Jeremy Roff; New South Wales	3:40.21	Brenton Rowe; Victoria	3:40.85
5000 metres	Bernard Lagat; United States (USA)	13:08.43	Ben St Lawrence; New South Wales	13:10.08	Chris Solinsky; United States (USA)	13:10.22
10,000 metres	Josphat Kiprono Menjo; Kenya (KEN)	27:39.80	Ben St Lawrence; New South Wales	28:05.25	Bobby Curtis; United States (USA)	28:08.78
110 metres hurdles (Wind: -1.3 m/s)	Siddhanth Thingalaya; India (IND)	14.14	Rayzam Shah Wan Sofian; Malaysia (MAS)	14.17	Greg Eyears; New South Wales	14.47
400 metres hurdles	Brendan Cole; Australian Capital Territory	50.46	Ian Dewhurst; New South Wales	51.05	Sasha Alexeenko; Queensland	51.22
3000 metres steeplechase	Youcef Abdi; New South Wales	8:38.13	Brett Robinson; Australian Capital Territory	8:52.47	Daryl Crook; Queensland	8:56.90
High jump	Chris Armet; Victoria	2.16 m	Joshua Lodge; New South Wales	2.12 m	Brandon Starc; New South Wales	2.08 m
Pole vault	Sergey Kucheryanu; Russia (RUS)	5.40 m	Joel Pocklington; Victoria	5.10 m	Stephen Cain; Victoria	4.95 m
Long jump	Mitchell Watt; Queensland	8.44 m (+1.6 m/s)	Robert Crowther; Australian Capital Territory	8.05 m (+2.5 m/s)	Fabrice Lapierre; New South Wales	7.83 m (+1.6 m/s)
Triple jump	Adam Rabone; Victoria	15.67 m (+0.8 m/s)	Ben King; Victoria	15.31 m (+1.2 m/s)	Joshua Lumley; Queensland	15.26 m (+1.1 m/s)
Shot put	Dale Stevenson; Victoria	19.24 m	Tom Walsh; New Zealand (NZL)	17.58 m	Stuart Gyngell; New South Wales	17.11 m
Discus throw	Benn Harradine; Victoria	63.15 m	Robert Melin; South Australia	52.96 m	Graham Hicks; Victoria	52.51 m
Hammer throw	Timothy Driesen; Australian Capital Territory	68.63 m	Simon Wardhaugh; Queensland	68.59 m	Mark Dickson; New South Wales	62.67 m
Javelin throw	Jarrod Bannister; Victoria	80.17 m	Leslie Copeland; Fiji (FIJ)	76.50 m	Benjamin Baker; New South Wales	71.79 m
Decathlon	Jarrod Sims; South Australia	7500 pts	Stephen Cain; Victoria	6863 pts	Matthew Harris; New South Wales	6722 pts

=== Women ===
Event	Gold		Silver		Bronze	
100 metres (Wind: -0.6 m/s)	Sally Pearson; Queensland	11.38	Charlotte van Veenendaal; Queensland Melissa Breen; Australian Capital Territory	11.67	Not awarded	
200 metres (Wind: -1.4 m/s)	Sally Pearson; Queensland	23.20	Charlotte van Veenendaal; Queensland	24.01	Crystal Attenborough; Northern Territory	24.17
400 metres	Tamsyn Lewis; Victoria	52.31	Caitlin Sargent; Queensland	53.18	Anneliese Rubie; New South Wales	53.31
800 metres	Tamsyn Lewis; Victoria	2:00.80	Kelly Hetherington; Victoria	2:03.58	Sianne Toemoe; New South Wales	2:03.59
1500 metres	Zoe Buckman; Australian Capital Territory	4:12.85	Kaila McKnight; Victoria	4:12.92	Georgie Clarke; Victoria	4:13.82
5000 metres	Belinda Martin; New South Wales	16:12.12	Abigail Bayley; Great Britain (GBR)	16:12.71	Danielle Trevis; New Zealand (NZL)	16:13.90
10,000 metres	Eloise Wellings; New South Wales	32:08.32	Lara Tamsett; New South Wales	32:32.02	Jessica Trengove; South Australia	34:21.14
100 metres hurdles (Wind: -1.1 m/s)	Sally Pearson; Queensland	12.83	Shannon McCann; Western Australia	13.55	Michelle Jenneke; New South Wales	14.25
400 metres hurdles	Lauren Boden; Australian Capital Territory	57.47	Lyndsay Pekin; Western Australia	59.37	Jess Gulli; Victoria	59.99
3000 metres steeplechase	Victoria Mitchell; Victoria	10:10.66	Caroline Mellsop; New Zealand (NZL)	10:14.17	Eleanor Wardleworth; South Australia	10:20.18
High jump	Ellen Pettitt; Victoria	1.83 m	Zoe Timmers; Western Australia	1.80 m	Emily Crutcher; New South Wales	1.80 m
Pole vault	Charmaine Lucock; Queensland	4.15 m	Rebecca Marchant; Victoria	3.90 m	Catherine MacRae; Victoria	3.70 m
Long jump	Kerrie Perkins; Australian Capital Territory	6.42 m (+1.2 m/s)	Brooke Stratton; Victoria	6.37 m	Jessica Penney; Australian Capital Territory	6.02 m (+0.5 m/s)
Triple jump	Emma Knight; Victoria	13.23 m (+0.8 m/s)	Linda Allen; Victoria	12.99 m (+0.1 m/s)	Nneka Okpala; New Zealand (NZL)	12.72 m (+0.5 m/s)
Shot put	Margaret Satupai; Victoria	15.86 m	Kim Mulhall; Victoria	14.31 m	Lomana Fagatuai; New South Wales	14.05 m
Discus throw	Dani Samuels; New South Wales	61.79 m	Kim Mulhall; Victoria	53.61 m	Margaret Satupai; Victoria	49.20 m
Hammer throw	Gabrielle Neighbour; Victoria	64.26 m	Bronwyn Eagles; New South Wales	59.99 m	Natalie Debeljuh; Victoria	58.02 m
Javelin throw	Kim Mickle; Western Australia	59.39 m	Kathryn Mitchell; Victoria	57.72 m	Laura Cornford; New South Wales	57.00 m
Heptathlon	Lauren Foote; South Australia	5539 pts	Ashleigh Hamilton; Victoria	5061 pts	Lauren Bale; Queensland	4967 pts
