= 2005–06 Australian Athletics Championships =

- Dates: 2–5 February 2006
- Host city: Sydney, Australia
- Venue: Sydney Olympic Park Athletic Centre
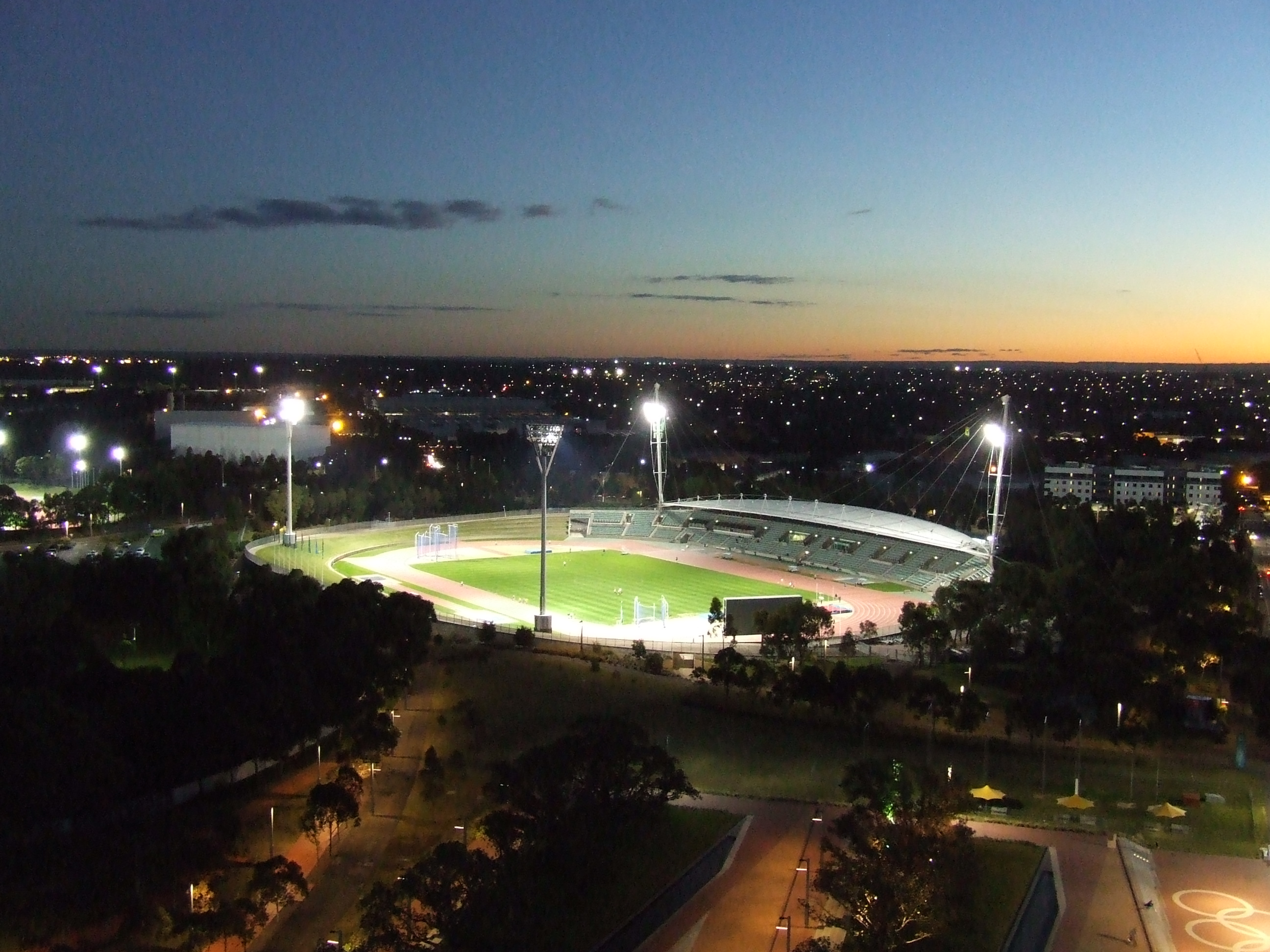

The 2005–06 Australian Athletics Championships was the 84th edition of the national championship in outdoor track and field for Australia. It was held from 2–5 February 2006 at the Sydney Olympic Park Athletic Centre in Sydney. It served as a selection meeting for Australia at the 2006 Commonwealth Games.

== Medal summary ==
=== Men ===
Event	Gold		Silver		Bronze	
100 metres (Wind: -1.2 m/s)	Josh Ross; New South Wales	10.35	Ambrose Ezenwa; New South Wales	10.37	Patrick Johnson; Australian Capital Territory	10.39
200 metres (Wind: -1.5 m/s)	Patrick Johnson; Australian Capital Territory	20.49	Daniel Batman; New South Wales	20.65	Ambrose Ezenwa; New South Wales	20.78
400 metres	John Steffensen; Western Australia	45.14	Clinton Hill; New South Wales	45.54	Sean Wroe; Victoria	46.19
800 metres	Nick Bromley; New South Wales	1:48.96	Werner Botha; Queensland	1:49.38	Lachlan Renshaw; New South Wales	1:49.60
1500 metres	Lachlan Chisholm; New South Wales	3:40.87	Collis Birmingham; Victoria	3:41.03	Paul Hoffman; New South Wales	3:41.05
5000 metres	Craig Mottram; Victoria	13:47.44	Louis Rowan; Victoria	13:57.92	Collis Birmingham; Victoria	13:58.15
10,000 metres	Andrew Letherby; Victoria	29:33.31	David Ruschena; Victoria	30:05.09	Dale Warrander; New Zealand (NZL)	30:13.66
110 metres hurdles (Wind: -1.5 m/s)	James Mortimer; New Zealand (NZL)	14.09	Kyle Vander-Kuyp; Victoria	14.23	Warwick Cregan; Western Australia	14.27
400 metres hurdles	Brendan Cole; Australian Capital Territory	50.07	Tristan Thomas; Tasmania	50.25	Elliott Wood; New South Wales	50.30
3000 metres steeplechase	Youcef Abdi; New South Wales	8:27.60	Martin Dent; Australian Capital Territory	8:29.98	Peter Nowill; Queensland	8:39.50
High jump	Nick Moroney; New South Wales	2.21 m	Kane Brigg; Queensland	2.17 m	Mark Taylor; New South Wales	2.14 m
Pole vault	Paul Burgess; Western Australia	5.80 m	Steve Hooker; Victoria	5.75 m	Dmitri Markov; South Australia	5.70 m
Long jump	Fabrice Lapierre; New South Wales	8.12 m (+1.7 m/s)	Tim Parravicini; Queensland	7.99 m (+3.7 m/s)	John Thornell; New South Wales	7.97 m (+1.4 m/s)
Triple jump	Andrew Murphy; New South Wales	16.66 m (+1.6 m/s)	Michael Perry; New South Wales	16.44 m (+1.2 m/s)	Jacob McReynolds; New South Wales	16.43 m (+0.2 m/s)
Shot put	Scott Martin; Victoria	19.64 m	Clay Cross; New South Wales	18.77 m	Chris Gaviglio; Queensland	18.55 m
Discus throw	Scott Martin; Victoria	62.08 m	Benn Harradine; Victoria	60.12 m	Aaron Neighbour; Victoria	59.14 m
Hammer throw	Stuart Rendell; Australian Capital Territory	76.33 m	Darren Billett; South Australia	66.32 m	Mark Dickson; New South Wales	65.85 m
Javelin throw	Stuart Farquhar; New Zealand (NZL)	81.70 m	Oliver Dziubak; Western Australia	81.57 m	William Hamlyn-Harris; New South Wales	79.19 m
Decathlon	Jason Dudley; Queensland	7895 pts	Richard Allan; Queensland	7549 pts	Matthew McEwen; Queensland	7490 pts

=== Women ===
Event	Gold		Silver		Bronze	
100 metres (Wind: -0.4 m/s)	Sally McLellan; Queensland	11.66	Crystal Attenborough; Northern Territory	11.81	Melanie Kleeberg; Queensland	11.82
200 metres (Wind: -0.5 m/s)	Melanie Kleeberg; Queensland	23.38	Crystal Attenborough; Northern Territory	23.47	Lauren Hewitt; Victoria	23.48
400 metres	Jane Arnott; New Zealand (NZL)	51.98	Tamsyn Lewis; Victoria	52.36	Rosemary Hayward; New South Wales	52.79
800 metres	Suzy Walsham; New South Wales	2:01.85	Rikke Roenholt; Australian Capital Territory	2:02.30	Libby Allen; Victoria	2:02.71
1500 metres	Sarah Jamieson; Victoria	4:05.52	Suzy Walsham; New South Wales	4:08.72	Lisa Corrigan; Australian Capital Territory	4:14.74
5000 metres	Eloise Wellings; New South Wales	15:28.72	Sonia O'Sullivan; Victoria	15:44.24	Emma Rilen; New South Wales	15:51.70
10,000 metres	Benita Johnson; Victoria	32:33.09	Kerryn McCann; New South Wales	33:01.19	Anna Thompson; Victoria	33:03.27
100 metres hurdles (Wind: -1.7 m/s)	Sally McLellan; Queensland	13.35	Andrea Miller; New Zealand (NZL)	13.70	Hayley Cameron; New South Wales	14.10
400 metres hurdles	Sonia Brito; Victoria	56.94	Lauren Boden; Australian Capital Territory	58.81	Lyndsay Pekin; Western Australia	60.26
3000 metres steeplechase	Melissa Rollison; Queensland	9:35.46	Donna MacFarlane; Tasmania	9:40.06	Kate McIlroy; New Zealand (NZL)	9:40.20
High jump	Ellen Pettitt; Western Australia	1.90 m	Claire Mallett; New South Wales	1.86 m	Petrina Price; New South Wales	1.83 m
Pole vault	Tatiana Grigorieva; Queensland	4.45 m	Vicky Parnov; Western Australia	4.30 m	Melina Hamilton; New Zealand (NZL)	4.25 m
Long jump	Bronwyn Thompson; Queensland	6.67 m (+1.5 m/s)	Kerrie Taurima; Australian Capital Territory	6.49 m (+2.5 m/s)	Chantal Brunner; New Zealand (NZL)	6.47 m (+0.2 m/s)
Triple jump	Linda Allen; Queensland	13.28 m (+1.6 m/s)	Jeanette Bowles; Victoria	12.96 m (+1.3 m/s)	Lisa Morrison; New South Wales	12.94 m (-0.4 m/s)
Shot put	ʻAna Poʻuhila; Tonga (TGA)	16.43 m	Dani Samuels; New South Wales	15.98 m	Gail Miller; Victoria	14.42 m
Discus throw	Beatrice Faumuina; New Zealand (NZL)	60.30 m	Dani Samuels; New South Wales	56.67 m	Monique Nacsa; Queensland	52.71 m
Hammer throw	Brooke Krueger-Billett; South Australia	70.72 m	Karyne Di Marco; New South Wales	64.86 m	Gabrielle Neighbour; Victoria	63.48 m
Javelin throw	Kim Mickle; Western Australia	58.56 m	Rosie Hooper; Victoria	56.09 m	Joanna Nixon; Queensland	53.97 m
Heptathlon	Kylie Wheeler; Western Australia	6031 pts	Jane Jamieson; New South Wales	5863 pts	Gillian Ragus; New South Wales	5595 pts
