= 2002–03 Australian Athletics Championships =

- Dates: 3–6 April 2003
- Host city: Brisbane, Australia
- Venue: Queensland Sport and Athletics Centre
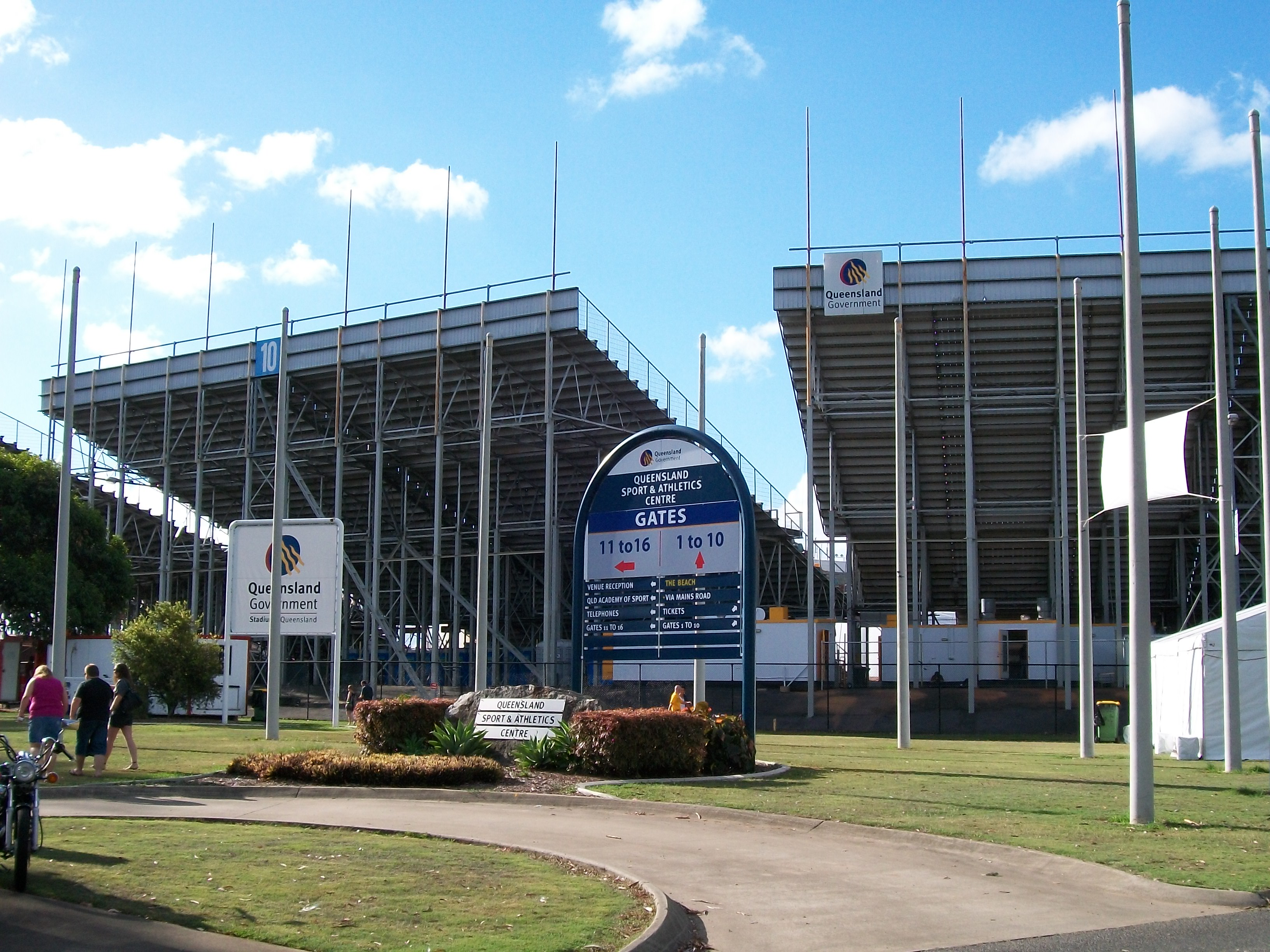

The 2002–03 Australian Athletics Championships was the 81st edition of the national championship in outdoor track and field for Australia. It was held from 3–6 April 2003 at the Queensland Sport and Athletics Centre in Brisbane. It served as a selection meeting for Australia at the 2003 World Championships in Athletics. Long-distance events were held separately: the 5000 metres took place at the Melbourne Track Classic on 1 March 2003 while the 10,000 metres was contested at 12 April 2003 in Runaway Bay, Queensland.

== Medal summary ==
=== Men ===
Event	Gold		Silver		Bronze	
100 metres (Wind: -1.4 m/s)	Patrick Johnson; Australian Capital Territory	10.25	Matt Shirvington; New South Wales	10.34	Adam Basil; Victoria	10.43
200 metres (Wind: -1.4 m/s)	Patrick Johnson; Australian Capital Territory	20.50	Ambrose Ezenwa; New South Wales	20.99	David Flowers; Victoria	21.33
400 metres	Clinton Hill; New South Wales	45.50	Daniel Batman; New South Wales	46.19	Casey Vincent; New South Wales	46.39
800 metres	Kris McCarthy; Victoria	1:48.20	Mark Rodgers; New Zealand (NZL)	1:48.56	Lachlan Chisholm; New South Wales	1:49.43
1500 metres	Alastair Stevenson; Queensland	3:42.99	David Byrne; New South Wales	3:43.03	Mark Fountain; Victoria	3:44.02
3000 metres	Michael Power; Victoria	8:00.45	Mark Tucker; Victoria	8:03.65	Shawn Forrest; Victoria	8:05.38
5000 metres	Daniel Komen; Kenya (KEN)	13:54.48	Michael Power; Victoria	13:55.99	Sean Keely; Canada (CAN)	13:58.19
10,000 metres	Shaun Creighton; Australian Capital Territory	29:27.56	Dean Cavuoto; Australian Capital Territory	29:28.67	Brett Cartwright; South Australia	29:30.74
110 metres hurdles (Wind: -1.9 m/s)	Kyle Vander-Kuyp; Victoria	14.14	Stuart Anderson; Queensland	14.15	Gregory Eyears; New South Wales	14.28
400 metres hurdles	Michael Hazel; Victoria	50.50	Tobby Sutherland; Victoria	51.43	Elliott Wood; New South Wales	52.04
3000 metres steeplechase	Peter Nowill; Queensland	8:41.61	Richard Jeremiah; Victoria	8:43.80	Mark Tucker; Victoria	8:55.12
4 × 100 m relay	New Zealand (NZL); James Dolphin; James Mortimer; Don MacDonald; Dallas Roberts	40.59	New South Wales (NSW); Shem Hollands; Isaac Ntiamoah; Andrew Jhavery; John Thornell	41.22	Queensland (QLD); Gavin Hunter; Damien Bock; Wagui Anau; Justin Smith	41.30
4 × 400 m relay	Victoria (VIC); Peter Ladd; Sean Avery; Tobby Sutherland; David Flowers	3:13.33	South Australia (SA); Timothy Johnson; Tom Hassell; Craig Fountain; Keith Sheehy	3:13.90	Western Australia (WA); John Steffensen; Chris De Boer; Tarn Brereton; Steven Tucker	3:15.68
High jump	Joshua Lodge; New South Wales	2.21 m	Nicholas Moroney; New South Wales	2.11 m	Phillip Nelson; Western Australia	2.11 m
Pole vault	Dmitri Markov; Western Australia	5.50 m	Viktor Chistiakov; South Australia	5.40 m	Paul Burgess; Western Australia	5.20 m
Long jump	Peter Burge; New South Wales	7.82 m (+2.1 m/s)	Shane Hair; Western Australia	7.79 m (+0.6 m/s)	John Thornell; New South Wales	7.78 m (+1.2 m/s)
Triple jump	Andrew Murphy; New South Wales	16.73 m (+1.0 m/s)	Michael Perry; New South Wales	16.25 m (+1.0 m/s)	Joshua Ferguson; Queensland	15.91 m (+1.7 m/s)
Shot put	Justin Anlezark; Queensland	20.96 m	Clay Cross; Queensland	19.00 m	Scott Martin; Victoria	18.72 m
Discus throw	Peter Elvy; New South Wales	58.42 m	Scott Martin; Victoria	56.99 m	Benn Harradine; New South Wales	55.25 m
Hammer throw	Stuart Rendell; Australian Capital Territory	76.61 m	Darren Billett; South Australia	65.09 m	Michael Gusbeth; Victoria	63.64 m
Javelin throw	Andrew Currey; New South Wales	80.56 m	William Hamlyn-Harris; New South Wales	79.44 m	Stuart Farquhar; New Zealand (NZL)	74.17 m
Decathlon	Matthew McEwen; Queensland	7724 pts	Darrel Muzyczka; New South Wales	6952 pts	Scott McLaren; New Zealand (NZL)	6700 pts

=== Women ===
Event	Gold		Silver		Bronze	
100 metres (Wind: -0.6 m/s)	Sharon Cripps; Queensland	11.50	Gloria Kemasuode; New South Wales	11.74	Amy Harris; Queensland	11.92
200 metres (Wind: -1.1 m/s)	Sharon Cripps; Queensland	23.39	Makelesi Bulikiobo; Fiji (FIJ)	23.64	Katerina Dressler; Victoria	24.05
400 metres	Cathy Freeman; Victoria	51.66	Rosemary Hayward; New South Wales	52.24	Makelesi Bulikiobo; Fiji (FIJ)	53.18
800 metres	Tamsyn Lewis; Victoria	2:00.13	Susan Andrews; Western Australia	2:01.30	Debbie Savage; New South Wales	2:03.66
1500 metres	Suzy Walsham; New South Wales	4:12.96	Emily Morris; New South Wales	4:15.56	Anna Thompson; Victoria	4:18.88
3000 metres	Anna Thompson; Victoria	9:21.79	Sarah Salmon; Australian Capital Territory	9:29.63	Kandy Grant; Australian Capital Territory	9:36.37
5000 metres	Benita Johnson; Australian Capital Territory	15:21.55	Eloise Poppett; New South Wales	15:56.73	Haley McGregor; Victoria	16:01.11
10,000 metres	Anna Thompson; Victoria	33:55.75	Jenny Philp-Young; Queensland	35:31.92	Serena Gibbs; Victoria	35:46.22
100 metres hurdles (Wind: -0.3 m/s)	Jacquie Munro; New South Wales	13.37	Fiona Cullen; Queensland	13.43	Rachel Rogers; Fiji (FIJ)	13.96
400 metres hurdles	Jana Pittman; Victoria	53.95	Rebecca Wardell; New Zealand (NZL)	56.50	Sonja Bowe; New Zealand (NZL)	59.94
3000 metres steeplechase	Victoria Mitchell; Victoria	10:20.60	Lee-Ann Turner; South Australia	10:42.58	Tiah Simmons; Tasmania	11:14.09
4 × 100 m relay	New Zealand (NZL); April Brough; Jane Arnott; Caro Hunt; Annmarie Spragg	46.04	Western Australia (WA); Kylie Bent; Lindsey McDonnell; Claire Cochrane; Kylie Wheeler	46.83	South Australia (SA); Lynette Viney; Andrea Sparrow; Kate Fenech; Erin Hewitt	47.57
4 × 400 m relay	Victoria (VIC); Jennifer Marshall; Renee Robson; Katerina Dressler; Cathy Freeman	3:39.65	New South Wales (NSW); Lynda Pagett; Merryn Aldridge; Annabelle Smith; Rosemary Hayward	3:42.48	Western Australia (WA); Lisa Hughes; Katherine Hancock; Kylie Wheeler; Susan Andrews	3:48.71
High jump	Miyuki Aoyama; Japan (JPN)	1.84 m	Petrina Price; New South Wales	1.81 m	Alexandra Church; New South Wales	1.78 m
Pole vault	Melina Hamilton; New Zealand (NZL)	4.20 m	Rosanna Ditton; Victoria	4.20 m	Tatiana Grigorieva; South Australia	4.10 m
Long jump	Bronwyn Thompson; Queensland	6.55 m (+1.8 m/s)	Kerrie Perkins; Australian Capital Territory	6.50 m (+2.0 m/s)	Sharon Sutherland; Western Australia	6.41 m (+1.5 m/s)
Triple jump	Jeanette Bowles; Victoria	12.72 m (+0.6 m/s)	Carmen Miller; Tasmania	12.66 m (+1.3 m/s)	Kelera Nacewa; New Zealand (NZL)	12.65 m (+1.0 m/s)
Shot put	Toshimi Ichioka; Japan (JPN)	16.61 m	ʻAna Poʻuhila; New Zealand (NZL)	15.80 m	Alifatou Djibril; South Australia	14.65 m
Discus throw	Beatrice Faumuina; New Zealand (NZL)	63.36 m	Debbie Pickersgill; Queensland	58.92 m	Monique Nacsa; Queensland	53.70 m
Hammer throw	Brooke Krueger; South Australia	66.41 m	Bronwyn Eagles; New South Wales	65.85 m	Deborah Sosimenko; New South Wales	62.87 m
Javelin throw	Bina Ramesh; France (FRA)	52.29 m	Rebecca Noy; New South Wales	52.26 m	Kathryn Mitchell; Victoria	50.98 m
Heptathlon	Kylie Wheeler; Western Australia	5838 pts	Mandy Heath; New South Wales	4991 pts	Danielle Senior; New South Wales	4903 pts
