= 2000–01 Australian Athletics Championships =

- Dates: 23–25 March 2001
- Host city: Brisbane, Australia
- Venue: Queensland Sport and Athletics Centre
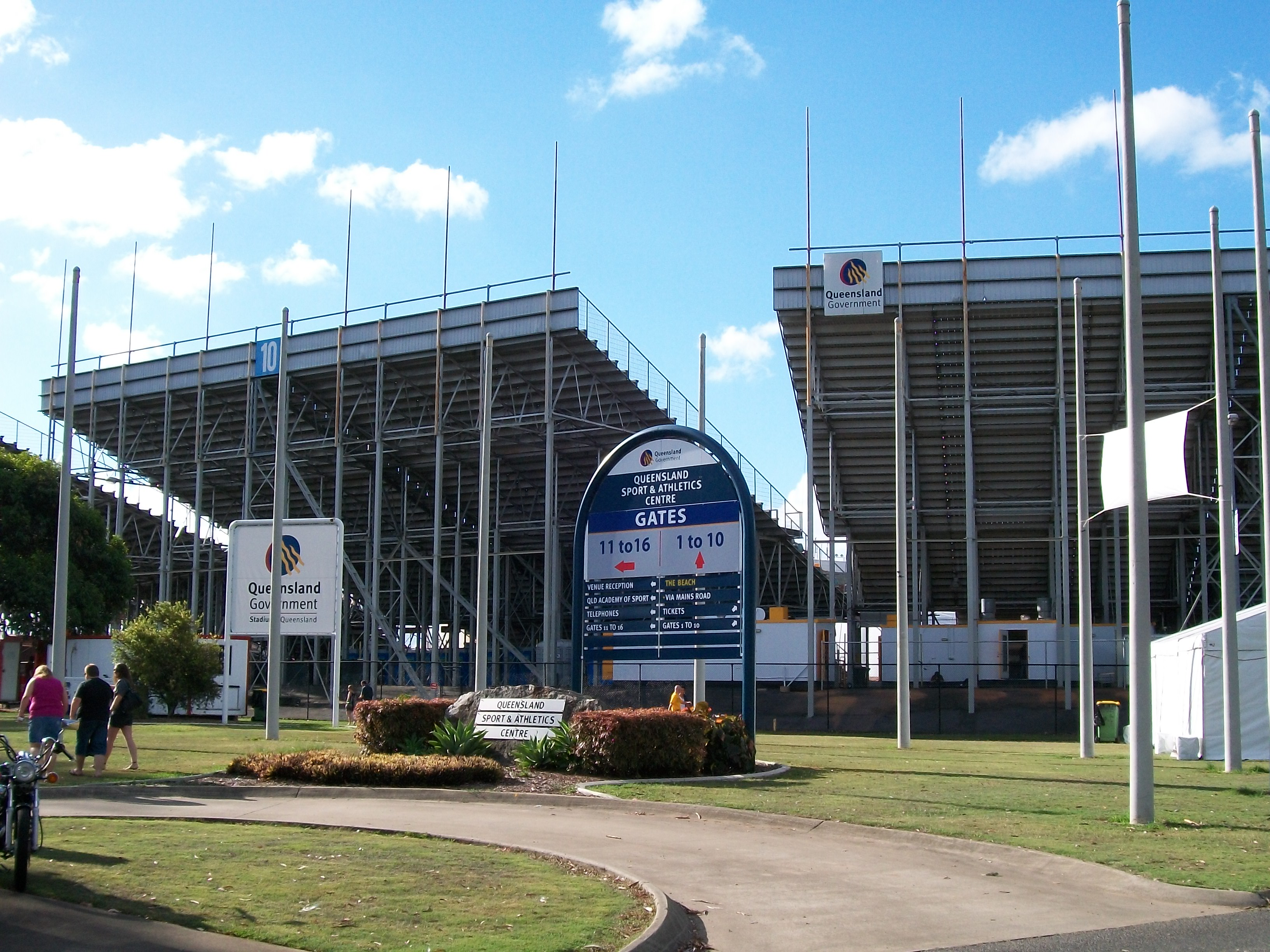

The 2000–01 Australian Athletics Championships was the 79th edition of the national championship in outdoor track and field for Australia. It was held from 23–25 March 2001 at the Queensland Sport and Athletics Centre in Brisbane. It served as a selection meeting for Australia at the 2001 World Championships in Athletics.

Long-distance events took place separately: the 10,000 metres event took place at the Zatopek 10K on 4 December 2000 at Lakeside Stadium in Melbourne and the 5000 metres events were held at the Hobart Grand Prix on 11 March 2001 in Hobart.

== Medal summary ==
=== Men ===
Event	Gold		Silver		Bronze	
100 metres (Wind: +0.9 m/s)	Matt Shirvington; New South Wales	10.19	Patrick Johnson; Australian Capital Territory	10.26	Paul Di Bella; Queensland	10.27
200 metres (Wind: +1.1 m/s)	Patrick Johnson; Australian Capital Territory	20.59	Paul Di Bella; Queensland	20.66	Paul Pearce; Victoria	20.75
400 metres	Paul Pearce; Victoria	45.87	Daniel Batman; New South Wales	45.93	Tomas Coman; Ireland (IRL)	46.18
800 metres	Kristopher McCarthy; Victoria	1:47.08	Mark Rodgers; New Zealand (NZL)	1:47.54	Frazer Dowling; New South Wales	1:47.60
1500 metres	Clinton Mackevicius; Victoria	3:41.74	Zac Ashkanasy; Queensland	3:43.94	Lachlan Chisholm; New South Wales	3:44.06
5000 metres	James Getanda; Kenya (KEN)	13:29.53	Michael Power; Victoria	13:30.50	Nigel Adkin; Victoria	13:44.86
10,000 metres	Luke Kipkosgei; Kenya (KEN)	27:57.11	Abraham Chebii; Kenya (KEN)	28:23.95	Sisay Bezabeh; Australian Capital Territory	28:40.09
110 metres hurdles (Wind: +1.8 m/s)	Kyle Vander-Kuyp; Victoria	13.55	Stuart Anderson; Queensland	13.73	Kimihiro Asami; Japan (JPN)	13.95
400 metres hurdles	Blair Young; Queensland	49.89	Yoshihiro Chiba; Japan (JPN)	50.12	Mathew Woodhouse; New South Wales	50.81
3000 metres steeplechase	Peter Nowill; Queensland	8:46.52	Yoshitaka Iwamizu; Japan (JPN)	8:49.10	Scott McTaggart; Australian Capital Territory	8:54.86
4 × 100 m relay	Otago; New Zealand (NZL); Jeremy Dixon; Lachlan McLellan; Josh Martin; Dallas Roberts	40.75	Pacific; Queensland (QLD); Travis Venema; Matthew Gardiner; Darryl Wohlsen; Mario La Rosa	40.81	Sydney Pacific; New South Wales (NSW); Tristan Conn; Brett McPherson; Stephen Hatch; Brad McNicol	41.29
4 × 400 m relay	Pacific; Queensland (QLD); Adam McClure; Blair Young; Darryl Wohlsen; Anton Booth	3:14.25	Otago; New Zealand (NZL); Jeremy Dixon; Lachlan McLellan; Dallas Roberts; Josh Martin	3:18.90	University of Queensland; Queensland (QLD); Eugene Farrell; Mark Abercromby; Chris Hughes; Jon Williams	3:20.20
High jump	Nick Moroney; New South Wales	2.22 m	Mark Taylor; New South Wales	2.14 m	Keith Elliott; New South Wales	2.14 m
Pole vault	Dmitri Markov; Western Australia	5.65 m	Paul Burgess; Western Australia	5.55 m	Viktor Chistiakov; South Australia	5.30 m
Long jump	Peter Burge; New South Wales	7.97 m (+0.8 m/s)	Tim Parravicini; Queensland	7.94 m (+0.7 m/s)	Leigh Stuart; Victoria	7.93 m (+0.9 m/s)
Triple jump	Andrew Murphy; New South Wales	16.96 m (+0.9 m/s)	Jacob McReynolds; New South Wales	16.47 m (+3.1 m/s)	Tim Barnes; New South Wales	16.33 m (+3.4 m/s)
Shot put	Justin Anlezark; Queensland	18.48 m	Scott Martin; Victoria	17.76 m	Aaron Neighbour; Victoria	17.65 m
Discus throw	Aaron Neighbour; Victoria	55.71 m	Graham Hicks; Tasmania	55.10 m	Peter Elvy; New South Wales	54.38 m
Hammer throw	Stuart Rendell; Australian Capital Territory	77.76 m	Aaron Fish; Queensland	67.72 m	Russell Devine; Victoria	63.56 m
Javelin throw	William Hamlyn-Harris; New South Wales	74.76 m	Andrew Currey; New South Wales	73.99 m	Joachim Kiteau; France (FRA)	73.02 m
Decathlon	Matthew McEwen; Queensland	7825 pts	Ashley Howlett; Tasmania	7054 pts	Matthew McDowall; Western Australia	6840 pts

=== Women ===
Event	Gold		Silver		Bronze	
100 metres (Wind: +1.2 m/s)	Lauren Hewitt; Victoria	11.31	Sharon Cripps; Queensland	11.51	Rachael Jackson; New South Wales	11.62
200 metres (Wind: +1.3 m/s)	Lauren Hewitt; Victoria	22.90	Sharon Cripps; Queensland	23.04	Nova Peris; Northern Territory	23.12
400 metres	Nova Peris; Northern Territory	52.49	Jane Arnott; New Zealand (NZL)	52.59	Rebecca Wardell; New Zealand (NZL)	52.67
800 metres	Tamsyn Lewis; Victoria	2:02.95	Libby Allen; Victoria	2:05.09	Rikke Rønholt; Denmark (DEN)	2:05.12
1500 metres	Suzy Walsham; New South Wales	4:14.61	Emily Morris; New South Wales	4:17.18	Anna Thompson; Tasmania	4:17.44
5000 metres	Liz Miller; New South Wales	15:52.66	Samukeliso Moyo; Zimbabwe (ZIM)	16:04.17	Anna Thompson; Tasmania	16:08.36
10,000 metres	Sonia O'Sullivan; Ireland (IRL)	33:17.58	Liz Miller; New South Wales	33:26.80	Susan Michelsson; Victoria	33:56.68
100 metres hurdles (Wind: +0.7 m/s)	Jacquie Munro; New South Wales	13.15	Debbi Edwards; New South Wales	13.37	Georgina Power; Victoria	13.51
400 metres hurdles	Jana Pittman; New South Wales	57.19	Stephanie Price; New South Wales	58.30	Nicola Kidd; New Zealand (NZL)	59.38
3000 metres steeplechase	Rachel Penney; New Zealand (NZL)	10:30.04	Leah Hirschfeld; New Zealand (NZL)	11:09.14	Jane Mudge; South Australia	11:17.03
4 × 100 m relay	University of Queensland; Queensland (QLD); Bindee Goon Chew; Melissa Moss; Amy Harris; Fiona Cullen	46.71	Melbourne University; Victoria (VIC); Rosina Dick; Jennifer Marshall; Nadia Smith; Rebecca O'Loughlin	48.51	Southern Suburbs; Queensland (QLD); Gemma Bright; Anna Petrie; Josephine Ngaluafe; Kathleen Norman	52.71
4 × 400 m relay	Melbourne University; Victoria (VIC); Rosina Dick; Carolyn Fox; Jennifer Marshall; Nova Peris	3:42.13	University of Queensland; Queensland (QLD); Katrina Sendall; Caitlin Willis; Rebecca Sadler; Ann Mooney	3:47.52	Grand Central; New Zealand (NZL); Anna Spriggens; Rachel Spriggens; Sarah Johnston; Sophie Chiet	3:56.93
High jump	Carmen Hunter; Queensland	1.82 m	Petrina Price; New South Wales	1.78 m	Peta Mason; Queensland	1.78 m
Pole vault	Jenni Dryburgh; New Zealand (NZL)	4.35 m	Tatiana Grigorieva; South Australia	4.25 m	Rachael Dacy; Victoria	4.15 m
Long jump	Chantal Brunner; New Zealand (NZL)	6.68 m (+0.7 m/s)	Shermin Oksuz; Western Australia	6.65 m (+3.0 m/s)	Bronwyn Thompson; Queensland	6.60 m (+2.1 m/s)
Triple jump	Nicole Mladenis; Western Australia	13.74 m (+1.1 m/s)	Kelera Nacewa; New Zealand (NZL)	13.17 m (+1.0 m/s)	Shelly Avery; New Zealand (NZL)	12.94 m (0.0 m/s)
Shot put	Yoko Toyonaga; Japan (JPN)	15.97 m	Michelle Haage; New South Wales	15.68 m	Alifaton Djibril; South Australia	14.04 m
Discus throw	Alison Lever; Queensland	59.74 m	Monique Nacsa; Queensland	55.00 m	Christy Thiel; New South Wales	53.68 m
Hammer throw	Bronwyn Eagles; New South Wales	66.58 m	Tasha Williams; New Zealand (NZL)	63.92 m	Karyne DI Marco; New South Wales	61.74 m
Javelin throw	Bina Ramesh; France (FRA)	54.54 m	Rosie Hooper; Victoria	53.88 m	Yayoi Shibano; Japan (JPN)	52.04 m
Heptathlon	Jane Jamieson; New South Wales	6070 pts	Mandy Heath; South Australia	5672 pts	Clare Thompson; Victoria	5570 pts
