= 2007–08 Australian Athletics Championships =

- Dates: 28 February – 1 March 2008
- Host city: Brisbane, Australia
- Venue: Queensland Sport and Athletics Centre
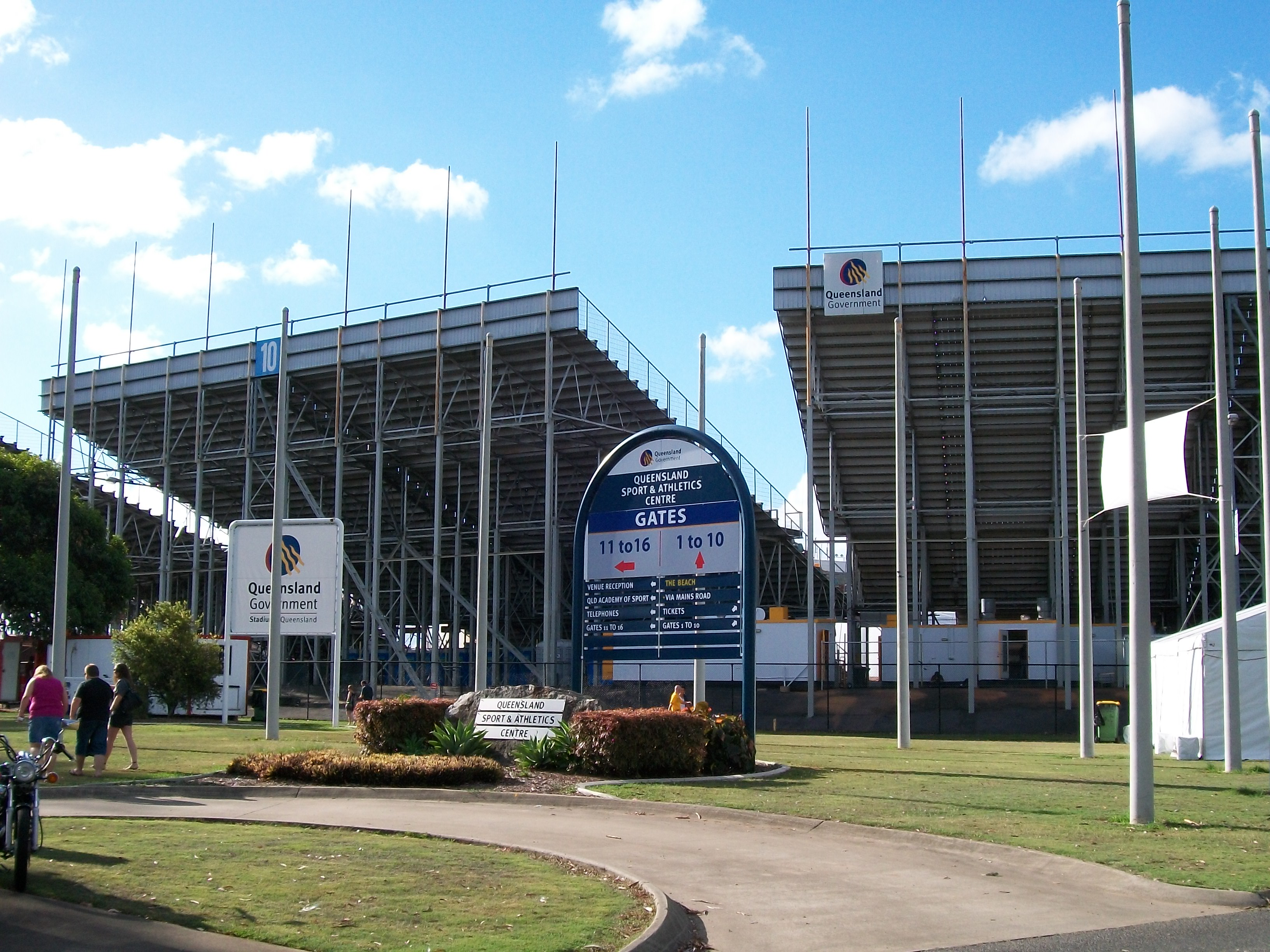

The 2007–08 Australian Athletics Championships was the 86th edition of the national championship in outdoor track and field for Australia. It was held from 28 February to 1 March 2008 at the Queensland Sport and Athletics Centre in Brisbane. It served as a selection meeting for Australia at the 2008 Summer Olympics.

Some distance events were held separately. The 10,000 metres event took place at the Zatopek 10K on 13 December 2007 at Lakeside Stadium in Melbourne, the men's 5000 metres was held at the Melbourne Track Classic on 21 February 2008 at the Olympic Park Stadium, and the women's 5000 metres was held at the Sydney Track Classic on 16 February 2008 at the Sydney Olympic Park Athletic Centre in Sydney.

== Medal summary ==
=== Men ===
| Event | Gold | | Silver | | Bronze | |
|---|---|---|---|---|---|---|
| 100 metres (Wind: -1.7 m/s) | Otis Gowa; Queensland | 10.63 | Jacob Groth; New South Wales | 10.67 | Isaac Ntiamoah; New South Wales | 10.68 |
| 200 metres (Wind: -1.2 m/s) | Daniel Batman; Australian Capital Territory | 20.89 | James Dolphin; New Zealand (NZL) | 21.12 | Matt Brown; New Zealand (NZL) | 21.42 |
| 400 metres | Joel Milburn; New South Wales | 45.90 | John Steffensen; Western Australia | 46.17 | Sean Wroe; Victoria | 46.23 |
| 800 metres | Lachlan Renshaw; New South Wales | 1:47.57 | Nick Bromley; New South Wales | 1:48.48 | Toby Sutherland; Australian Capital Territory | 1:48.63 |
| 1500 metres | Mitchell Kealey; Queensland | 3:40.62 | Bradley Woods; New South Wales | 3:40.91 | Jeremy Roff; New South Wales | 3:42.66 |
| 3000 metres | Craig Mottram; Victoria | 7:48.26 | Shadrack Kosgei; Kenya (KEN) | 7:53.72 | Collis Birmingham; Victoria | 7:55.47 |
| 5000 metres | Craig Mottram; Victoria | 13:11.99 | Shadrack Kosgei; Kenya (KEN) | 13:13.51 | Abreham Cherkos; Ethiopia (ETH) | 13:18.47 |
| 10,000 metres | Collis Birmingham; Victoria | 28:39.91 | Martin Dent; Australian Capital Territory | 28:49.73 | Rees Buck; New Zealand (NZL) | 29:12.42 |
| 110 metres hurdles (Wind: -0.2 m/s) | Justin Merlino; New South Wales | 13.72 | James Mortimer; New Zealand (NZL) | 14.00 | Warwick Cregan; Western Australia | 14.09 |
| 400 metres hurdles | Tristan Thomas; Tasmania | 51.41 | Dane Richter; Western Australia | 51.50 | Mowen Boino; Papua New Guinea (PNG) | 52.39 |
| 3000 metres steeplechase | Martin Dent; Australian Capital Territory | 8:34.34 | Collins Kosgei; Kenya (KEN) | 8:35.42 | Youcef Abdi; New South Wales | 8:37.69 |
| High jump | Cal Pearce; Queensland | 2.22 m | Liam Zamel-Paez; Queensland | 2.19 m | Nick Moroney; New South Wales | 2.19 m |
| Pole vault | Steve Hooker; Western Australia | 5.55 m | Matt Boyd; Queensland | 5.35 m | James Filshie; Victoria | 5.25 m |
| Long jump | Robert Crowther; Queensland | 7.86 m (+0.3 m/s) | Tim Parravicini; Queensland | 7.71 m (+0.2 m/s) | Daisuke Arakawa; Japan (JPN) | 7.71 m (+1.2 m/s) |
| Triple jump | Alwyn Jones; South Australia | 16.42 m (+0.8 m/s) | Michael Perry; New South Wales | 16.05 m (+1.4 m/s) | Alexander Stewart; New South Wales | 15.74 m (+0.8 m/s) |
| Shot put | Justin Anlezark; Queensland | 20.21 m | Scott Martin; Victoria | 20.19 m | Chris Gaviglio; Queensland | 18.92 m |
| Discus throw | Benn Harradine; Victoria | 62.37 m | Peter Elvy; New South Wales | 58.92 m | Aaron Neighbour; Victoria | 57.35 m |
| Hammer throw | Hiroaki Doi; Japan (JPN) | 68.70 m | Darren Billett; South Australia | 65.45 m | Mark Dickson; New South Wales | 64.55 m |
| Javelin throw | Jarrod Bannister; Queensland | 89.02 m | Mike Hazle; United States (USA) | 81.89 m | Stuart Farquhar; New Zealand (NZL) | 78.92 m |
| Decathlon | Jason Dudley; Queensland | 7783 pts | Kyle Rasti; Western Australia | 7444 pts | Kyle McCarthy; Queensland | 7404 pts |

=== Women ===
| Event | Gold | | Silver | | Bronze | |
|---|---|---|---|---|---|---|
| 100 metres (Wind: -0.9 m/s) | Fiona Cullen; Queensland | 11.80 | Jody Henry; Western Australia | 11.84 | Laura Verlinden; New South Wales | 11.85 |
| 200 metres (Wind: -0.4 m/s) | Makelesi Batimala; Fiji (FIJ) | 23.76 | Monique Williams; New Zealand (NZL) | 23.79 | Olivia Tauro; New South Wales | 23.86 |
| 400 metres | Tamsyn Lewis; Victoria | 51.44 | Makelesi Batimala; Fiji (FIJ) | 52.76 | Monique Williams; New Zealand (NZL) | 52.86 |
| 800 metres | Tamsyn Lewis; Victoria | 2:02.12 | Madeleine Pape; Victoria | 2:03.52 | Rikke Albertsen; Australian Capital Territory | 2:03.91 |
| 1500 metres | Veronique Molan; New South Wales | 4:20.85 | Nikki Hamblin; New Zealand (NZL) | 4:21.04 | Georgie Clarke; Victoria | 4:21.55 |
| 3000 metres | Chloe Tighe; New South Wales | 9:27.63 | Rowan Baird; New Zealand (NZL) | 9:32.58 | Catherine Bryson; Australian Capital Territory | 9:43.95 |
| 5000 metres | Georgie Clarke; Victoria | 15:24.03 | René Kalmer; South Africa (RSA) | 15:48.33 | Emma Rilen; New South Wales | 16:00.59 |
| 10,000 metres | Melinda Vernon; New South Wales | 34:28.85 | Josie Carberry; Victoria | 35:19.59 | Tara Palm; South Australia | 35:49.40 |
| 100 metres hurdles (Wind: -2.7 m/s) | Andrea Miller; New Zealand (NZL) | 13.56 | Dedeh Erawati; Indonesia (INA) | 13.72 | Mami Ishino; Japan (JPN) | 13.91 |
| 400 metres hurdles | Lauren Boden; Australian Capital Territory | 58.06 | Lyndsay Pekin; Western Australia | 59.90 | Brittney McGlone; Australian Capital Territory | 60.04 |
| 3000 metres steeplechase | Donna MacFarlane; Tasmania | 9:36.09 | Melissa Rollison; Queensland | 9:50.59 | Victoria Mitchell; Victoria | 10:03.35 |
| High jump | Catherine Drummond; Queensland | 1.84 m | Vicki Collins; Queensland | 1.81 m | Ellen Pettitt; Western Australia | 1.81 m |
| Pole vault | Alana Boyd; Queensland | 4.45 m | Vicky Parnov; Western Australia | 4.20 m | Rosanna Ditton; Victoria | 4.20 m |
| Long jump | Bronwyn Thompson; Queensland | 6.67 m (+0.5 m/s) | Kerrie Taurima; Australian Capital Territory | 6.25 m (+0.3 m/s) | Jacinta Boyd; Queensland | 6.17 m (+1.8 m/s) |
| Triple jump | Emma Knight; Western Australia | 13.18 m (+0.8 m/s) | Linda Allen; Queensland | 13.00 m (-0.7 m/s) | Lisa Morrison; New South Wales | 12.96 m (-0.4 m/s) |
| Shot put | Valerie Vili; New Zealand (NZL) | 19.54 m | Ana Po'uhila; Tonga (TGA) | 17.06 m | Kimberley Mulhall; Victoria | 14.94 m |
| Discus throw | Dani Samuels; New South Wales | 62.95 m | Beatrice Faumuina; New Zealand (NZL) | 59.27 m | Alifatou Djibril; South Australia | 51.60 m |
| Hammer throw | Bronwyn Eagles; New South Wales | 63.65 m | Karyne Di Marco; New South Wales | 60.08 m | Gabrielle Neighbour; Victoria | 58.37 m |
| Javelin throw | Kathryn Mitchell; Victoria | 58.77 m | Kim Mickle; Western Australia | 55.78 m | Rosie Hooper; Victoria | 51.99 m |
| Heptathlon | Kylie Wheeler; Western Australia | 6087 pts | Rebecca Wardell; New Zealand (NZL) | 5700 pts | Sarah Cowley; New Zealand (NZL) | 5483 pts |
