= Royal Park Golf Club =

Golf park in Royal Park, Melbourne, Victoria, Australia

Coordinates: 37.779237°S 144.953721°E

Club information
- Established: 1903
- Type: Public
- Tota holes: 9
- Website: royalparkgolfcourse.ymca.org.au

Situated on the northern boundary of Royal Park, Melbourne, Victoria, Australia, the Royal Park Golf Course is a 9-hole golf course located only 3 km from the city. It has the honour of being possibly the only golf course with both tram and trains running through it: the route 58 tram and Upfield railway line (Royal Adelaide Golf Club only has a railway line running through it).

The Royal Park Golf Club, formed in 1903, has been the nursery for many golfers who went on to make a mark in the golfing world, including Peter Thomson (club champion at the age of 16, in 1945) who won the Open Championship (sometimes known as the British Open) 5 times, as well as Gus Jackson and Mick Ryan.

== History ==
Between the years of 1890 and 1903 golf was played in Royal Park, Melbourne, but without a proper golf course. It wasn't until 1903 that a group of golf enthusiasts met at the Parkville Hotel to discuss forming a club. For a nominal rent, sufficient land for an 18-hole course was obtained from the Royal Park Trustees and the Royal Park Golf Course was built and maintained by volunteers and club members.

Membership numbers had fallen so low by 1911 that members could not afford the upkeep on the 18-hole course and it was reduced to 9 holes. But that didn't stop the junior pennant team winning all its matches 8 years later in 1919 to win the flag.

The members made small improvements to the course, with approval from the Royal Park Trustees. In 1934 control of Royal Park changed from the Trustees to the Melbourne City Council (City of Melbourne). Immediate improvements to the golf course included mowing of the fairways and bunkers and mounds being added to the course layout.

Royal Park has been the mother club for many notable golfers who went on to make their mark in the golfing world. These include:

- Gus Jackson (1926 and 1933 Victorian Amateur Championship, amongst other titles),
- Mick Ryan (1930 and 1932 Victorian Amateur Championship, 1929 Australian Amateur, 1932 Australian Open, amongst other titles)
- Peter Thomson (1948 Victorian Amateur Championship, 1951 Australian Open, and 5 Open Championships amongst other titles).

The clubhouse, built on land leased from the Victorian Railways Department from 1906 onwards, was renovated and maintained by club members until 1970 when it was destroyed by fire. Permission to rebuild the clubhouse proved difficult with the condition of occupancy offered by the Council being rejected by club members, so after talks with the Keilor Golf Club the club disbanded and the two clubs merged into the Tullamarine Country Club.

The council took over the running of the course from March 1971, and in the mid-1980s hired Peter Thomson's firm of Golf Course Architects to improve the course layout.

The club re-formed in 1974 with an 18-hole competition played on Saturdays and a 9-hole competition on Sundays. This was reversed in 1976 and by 1989 competitions days were Sundays only. Members were allowed to use part of the restaurant built by council, to be used as a clubhouse. By 2002 a Saturday 9-hole competition was reintroduced and renovations to pro-shop and clubhouse were undertaken by council, including the addition of a verandah. Membership numbers at the end of 2002 were close to 80, including juniors and 3 women, one being the first committee member in the hundred-year history of the club.

The club celebrated its 100th year in 2003 with a Centenary Weekend of Golf tournament, with Peter Thomson returning to the Club to present prizes to Club winners. Peter also wrote the foreword to the book of the club's history, written by Club member and first female committee member.

== Citations ==
Hilton, Denise (2003). A centenary in the park: the history of the Royal Park Golf Club. Parkville, Vic.: Royal Park Golf Club. ISBN 0-646-42676-1.

Hoy, L.A. (1950). The history of Royal Park Golf Club. Parkville, Vic.: Royal Park Golf Club.
