= List of Australian athletics champions (men) =

The Australian Athletics Championships have been conducted since 1890. The most successful athlete at the Championships has been thrower Warwick Selvey who won 19 championships events. Below is a list of Australian champions in athletics by event. Through 1965, the distances run were in Imperial units (yards). 1966 saw a wholesale conversion to metric units.

== 100 metres ==
Note: 100 yards until 1966

- 1890: Not held
- 1891: Not held
- 1892: Not held
- 1893: Not held
- 1894: Billy MacPherson
- 1895: Not held
- 1896: Bill Cartwright
- 1897: Not held
- 1898: Stan Rowley
- 1899: Not held
- 1900: Stan Rowley
- 1901: Not held
- 1902: George Moir
- 1903: Not held
- 1904: Herb Hunter
- 1905: Not held
- 1906: Nigel Barker
- 1907: Not held
- 1908: Nigel Barker
- 1909: Not held
- 1910: William Woodger (NZL)
- 1911: Not held
- 1912: Ron Opie (NZL)
- 1913: Not held
- 1914: George Parker (USA)
- 1915: Not held
- 1916: Not held
- 1917: Not held
- 1918: Not held
- 1919: Not held
- 1920: William Hunt
- 1921: Not held
- 1922: Slip Carr
- 1923: Not held
- 1924: Les Parker
- 1925: Not held
- 1926: Les Parker
- 1927: Not held
- 1928: Jimmy Carlton
- 1929: Not held

- 1930: Jim Carlton
- 1931: Not held
- 1932: Jim Carlton
- 1933: Not held
- 1934: Noel Dempsey
- 1935: Not held
- 1936: Ted Hampson
- 1937: Not held
- 1938: Howard Yates
- 1939: Not held
- 1940: Not held
- 1941: Not held
- 1942: Not held
- 1943: Not held
- 1944: Not held
- 1945: Not held
- 1946: Not held
- 1947: John Treloar
- 1948: John Treloar
- 1949: Lloyd LaBeach (PAN)
- 1950: John Treloar
- 1951: Bill de Gruchy
- 1952: Hec Hogan
- 1953: Hec Hogan
- 1954: Hec Hogan
- 1955: Hec Hogan
- 1956: Hec Hogan
- 1957: Hec Hogan
- 1958: Hec Hogan
- 1959: Brian Waters
- 1960: Dennis Tipping
- 1961: Gary Holdsworth
- 1962: Gary Holdsworth
- 1963: Bob Lay
- 1964: Bob Lay
- 1965: Bob Lay
- 1966: Gary Holdsworth
- 1967: Gary Holdsworth
- 1968: Mel Pender (USA)
- 1969: Greg Lewis

- 1970: Eric Bigby
- 1971: Eric Bigby
- 1972: Laurie d'Arcy (NZL)
- 1973: David Stokes
- 1974: Graham Haskell
- 1975: Graham Haskell
- 1976: Greg Lewis
- 1977: Paul Narracott
- 1978: Paul Narracott
- 1979: Paul Narracott
- 1980: Richard James
- 1981: Peter Gandy
- 1982: Paul Narracott
- 1983: Paul Narracott
- 1984: Paul Narracott
- 1985: Fred Martin
- 1986: Gerrard Keating
- 1987: Shane Naylor
- 1988: Shane Naylor
- 1989: David Dworjanyn
- 1990: Tim Jackson
- 1991: Dean Capobianco
- 1992: Shane Naylor
- 1993: Dean Capobianco
- 1994: Damien Marsh
- 1995: Shane Naylor
- 1996: Damien Marsh
- 1997: Steve Brimacombe
- 1998: Matt Shirvington
- 1999: Matt Shirvington
- 2000: Matt Shirvington
- 2001: Matt Shirvington
- 2002: Matt Shirvington
- 2003: Patrick Johnson
- 2004: Josh Ross
- 2005: Josh Ross
- 2006: Josh Ross
- 2007: Josh Ross
- 2008: Otis Gowa
- 2009: Josh Ross

- 2010: Aaron Rouge-Serret
- 2011: Aaron Rouge-Serret
- 2012: Josh Ross
- 2013: Josh Ross
- 2014: Tim Leathart
- 2015: Joshua Clarke
- 2016: Alex Hartmann
- 2017: Joseph Millar (NZL)
- 2018: Trae Williams
- 2019: Edward Osei-Nketia (NZL)
- 2020: Not held
- 2021: Rohan Browning
- 2022: Jake Doran
- 2023: Rohan Browning
- 2024: Sebastian Sultana
- 2025: Rohan Browning
- 2026: Lachlan Kennedy

== 200 metres ==
Note: 220 yards until 1966

- 1890: Not held
- 1891: Not held
- 1892: Not held
- 1893: Not held
- 1894: Billy MacPherson
- 1895: Not held
- 1896: Bill Cartwright
- 1897: Not held
- 1898: Stan Rowley
- 1899: Not held
- 1900: Stan Rowley
- 1901: Not held
- 1902: George Moir
- 1903: Not held
- 1904: Nigel Barker
- 1905: Not held
- 1906: Nigel Barker
- 1907: Not held
- 1908: Nigel Barker
- 1909: Not held
- 1910: William Woodger (NZL)
- 1911: Not held
- 1912: Ron Opie (NZL)
- 1913: Not held
- 1914: George Parker (USA)
- 1915: Not held
- 1916: Not held
- 1917: Not held
- 1918: Not held
- 1919: Not held
- 1920: William Hunt
- 1921: Not held
- 1922: Slip Carr
- 1923: Not held
- 1924: Norm Grehan
- 1925: Not held
- 1926: Norm Grehan
- 1927: Not held
- 1928: Jimmy Carlton
- 1929: Not held

- 1930: Jim Carlton
- 1931: Not held
- 1932: Jim Carlton
- 1933: Not held
- 1934: Howard Yates
- 1935: Not held
- 1936: Ray Moffat
- 1937: Not held
- 1938: Howard Yates
- 1939: Not held
- 1940: Not held
- 1941: Not held
- 1942: Not held
- 1943: Not held
- 1944: Not held
- 1945: Not held
- 1946: Not held
- 1947: John Bartram
- 1948: John Treloar
- 1949: Herb McKenley (JAM)
- 1950: John Treloar
- 1951: John Bartram
- 1952: John Treloar
- 1953: Brian Butterfield
- 1954: Hec Hogan
- 1955: Douglas Winston
- 1956: Hec Hogan
- 1957: Kevan Gosper
- 1958: Terry Gale
- 1959: Don Bursill
- 1960: Dennis Tipping
- 1961: Gary Holdsworth
- 1962: Peter Vassella
- 1963: Gary Holdsworth
- 1964: Gary Holdsworth
- 1965: Gary Eddy
- 1966: Peter Norman
- 1967: Peter Norman
- 1968: Peter Norman
- 1969: Peter Norman

- 1970: Peter Norman
- 1971: Bruce Weatherlake
- 1972: Greg Lewis
- 1973: Greg Lewis
- 1974: Richard Hopkins
- 1975: Peter Fitzgerald
- 1976: Greg Lewis
- 1977: Colin McQueen
- 1978: Colin McQueen
- 1979: Colin McQueen
- 1980: Bruce Frayne
- 1981: Bruce Frayne
- 1982: Peter Gandy
- 1983: Bruce Frayne
- 1984: Peter Van Miltenburg
- 1985: Clayton Kearney
- 1986: Robert Stone
- 1987: John Dinan
- 1988: Kieran Finn (IRE)
- 1989: Darren Clark
- 1990: Robert Stone
- 1991: Dean Capobianco
- 1992: Dean Capobianco
- 1993: Damien Marsh
- 1994: Steve Brimacombe
- 1995: Steve Brimacombe
- 1996: Dean Capobianco
- 1997: Steve Brimacombe
- 1998: Chris Donaldson (NZL)
- 1999: Chris Donaldson (NZL)
- 2000: Darryl Wohlsen
- 2001: Patrick Johnson
- 2002: David Geddes
- 2003: Patrick Johnson
- 2004: Ambrose Ezenwa (NGR)
- 2005: Daniel Batman
- 2006: Patrick Johnson
- 2007: Joshua Ross
- 2008: Daniel Batman
- 2009: Aaron Rouge-Serret

- 2010: Patrick Johnson
- 2011: Aaron Rouge-Serret
- 2012: Joseph Millar (NZL)
- 2013: Josh Ross
- 2014: Mangar Chuot
- 2015: Banuve Tabakaucoro (FIJ)
- 2016: Alex Hartmann
- 2017: Joseph Millar (NZL)
- 2018: Alex Hartmann
- 2019: Alex Hartmann
- 2020: Not held
- 2021: Alexander Beck
- 2022: Aidan Murphy
- 2023: Jake Doran
- 2024: Calab Law
- 2025: Gout Gout
- 2026: Gout Gout

== 400 metres ==
Note: 440 yards until 1966

- 1890: Not held
- 1891: Not held
- 1892: Not held
- 1893: Not held
- 1894: Billy MacPherson
- 1895: Not held
- 1896: W. Low (NZL)
- 1897: Not held
- 1898: Charles Campbell
- 1899: Not held
- 1900: William Shea
- 1901: Not held
- 1902: A. Oxlade
- 1903: Not held
- 1904: Nigel Barker
- 1905: Not held
- 1906: Nigel Barker
- 1907: Not held
- 1908: Nigel Barker
- 1909: Not held
- 1910: Nigel Barker
- 1911: Not held
- 1912: Ron Opie (NZL)
- 1913: Not held
- 1914: George Parker (USA)
- 1915: Not held
- 1916: Not held
- 1917: Not held
- 1918: Not held
- 1919: Not held
- 1920: Bart Linehan
- 1921: Not held
- 1922: William Hutton
- 1923: Not held
- 1924: Les Tracey (NZL)
- 1925: Not held
- 1926: Roy Norman
- 1927: Not held
- 1928: Charles Stuart
- 1929: Not held

- 1930: Herbert Bascombe
- 1931: Not held
- 1932: Francis O'Brien
- 1933: Not held
- 1934: George Golding
- 1935: Not held
- 1936: Howard Yates
- 1937: John Mumford
- 1938: Not held
- 1939: Not held
- 1940: Not held
- 1941: Not held
- 1942: Not held
- 1943: Not held
- 1944: Not held
- 1945: Not held
- 1946: Not held
- 1947: John Bartram
- 1948: John Bartram
- 1949: Edwin Carr
- 1950: Edwin Carr
- 1951: Leon Gregory
- 1952: Edwin Carr
- 1953: Graham Gipson
- 1954: Bill Job
- 1955: Leon Gregory
- 1956: Kevan Gosper
- 1957: Kevan Gosper
- 1958: Kevan Gosper
- 1959: Kevan Gosper
- 1960: Kevan Gosper
- 1961: Brian Waters
- 1962: Ken Roche
- 1963: Ken Roche
- 1964: Ken Roche
- 1965: Paul Bowman
- 1966: Gary Eddy
- 1967: Gary Eddy
- 1968: Jim Kemp (USA)
- 1969: Bill Hooker

- 1970: Ross Wilson
- 1971: Ross Wilson
- 1972: Wayne Collett (USA)
- 1973: Graeme Wright
- 1974: Steve Gee
- 1975: Steve Gee
- 1976: Rick Mitchell
- 1977: Rick Mitchell
- 1978: John Higham
- 1979: Colin McQueen
- 1980: Rick Mitchell
- 1981: Mike Willis
- 1982: Gary Minihan
- 1983: Gary Minihan
- 1984: Bruce Frayne
- 1985: Miles Murphy
- 1986: Darren Clark
- 1987: Miles Murphy
- 1988: Miles Murphy
- 1989: Darren Clark
- 1990: Darren Clark
- 1991: Paul Greene
- 1992: Mark Garner
- 1993: Darren Clark
- 1994: Brett Callaghan
- 1995: Paul Greene
- 1996: Jamie Baulch (GBR)
- 1997: Brad Jamieson
- 1998: Declan Stack
- 1999: Brad Jamieson
- 2000: Patrick Dwyer
- 2001: Paul Pearce
- 2002: Clinton Hill
- 2003: Clinton Hill
- 2004: Clinton Hill
- 2005: Ben Offereins
- 2006: John Steffensen
- 2007: Sean Wroe
- 2008: Joel Milburn
- 2009: Sean Wroe

- 2010: Ben Offereins
- 2011: Steven Solomon
- 2012: Steven Solomon
- 2013: Alex Beck
- 2014: Steven Solomon
- 2015: Craig Burns
- 2016: Steven Solomon
- 2017: Steven Solomon
- 2018: Murray Goodwin
- 2019: Steven Solomon
- 2020: Not held
- 2021: Alex Beck
- 2022: Alex Beck
- 2023: Luke van Ratingen
- 2024: Cooper Sherman
- 2025: Cooper Sherman
- 2026: Reece Holder

== 800 metres ==
Note: 880 yards until 1966

- 1890: Not held
- 1891: Not held
- 1892: Not held
- 1893: Not held
- 1894: Ken McRae
- 1895: Not held
- 1896: Ern Corner
- 1897: Not held
- 1898: Charles Campbell
- 1899: Not held
- 1900: D'Arcy Wentworth
- 1901: Not held
- 1902: D'Arcy Wentworth
- 1903: Not held
- 1904: Harvey Sutton
- 1905: Not held
- 1906: Greg Wheatley
- 1907: Not held
- 1908: W. Trembath (NZL)
- 1909: Not held
- 1910: Greg Wheatley
- 1911: Not held
- 1912: Guy Harding (NZL)
- 1913: Not held
- 1914: Russell Watson
- 1915: Not held
- 1916: Not held
- 1917: Not held
- 1918: Not held
- 1919: Not held
- 1920: Reg Piggott
- 1921: Not held
- 1922: Charles Taylor (NZL)
- 1923: Not held
- 1924: Tickle Whyte
- 1925: Not held
- 1926: Tickle Whyte
- 1927: Not held
- 1928: Charles Stuart
- 1929: Not held

- 1930: Otto Peltzer (GER)
- 1931: Not held
- 1932: Ray Triado
- 1933: Not held
- 1934: Thorold Irwin
- 1935: Not held
- 1936: Gerald Backhouse
- 1937: Not held
- 1938: Gerald Backhouse
- 1939: Not held
- 1940: Not held
- 1941: Not held
- 1942: Not held
- 1943: Not held
- 1944: Not held
- 1945: Not held
- 1946: Not held
- 1947: Jack Stevens
- 1948: Bill Ramsay
- 1949: David White
- 1950: Don MacMillan
- 1951: Jim Bailey
- 1952: Don MacMillan
- 1953: John Landy
- 1954: Jim Bailey
- 1955: Don MacMillan
- 1956: Frank O'Connell
- 1957: Herb Elliott
- 1958: Herb Elliott
- 1959: Tony Blue
- 1960: Herb Elliott
- 1961: Russell Oakley
- 1962: Tony Blue
- 1963: Tony Blue
- 1964: John Davies (NZL) Chris Woods (Aus)
- 1965: Ralph Doubell
- 1966: Ralph Doubell
- 1967: Ralph Doubell
- 1968: Preston Davis (USA)
- 1969: Ralph Doubell

- 1970: Ralph Doubell
- 1971: Graeme Rootham
- 1972: Graeme Rootham
- 1973: Graeme Rootham
- 1974: Peter Watson
- 1975: Colin McCurry
- 1976: Jamie Botten
- 1977: John Higham
- 1978: John Higham
- 1979: John Higham
- 1980: Peter Bourke
- 1981: Michael Hillardt
- 1982: Peter Bourke
- 1983: Michael Hillardt
- 1984: Peter Bourke
- 1985: Alan Ozolins
- 1986: Alan Ozolins
- 1987: Ian Gaudry
- 1988: Ian Gaudry
- 1989: Simon Doyle
- 1990: Dean Kenneally
- 1991: Simon Doyle
- 1992: Barry Acres
- 1993: Simon Lewin
- 1994: Brendan Hanigan
- 1995: Sammy Langat (KEN)
- 1996: Sammy Langat (KEN)
- 1997: Elijah Maru (KEN)
- 1998: Noah Ngeny (KEN)
- 1999: Noah Ngeny (KEN)
- 2000: Djabir Saïd-Guerni (ALG)
- 2001: Kris McCarthy
- 2002: Nicholas Hudson
- 2003: Kris McCarthy
- 2004: Samwel Mwera (KEN)
- 2005: Nick Bromley
- 2006: Nick Bromley
- 2007: Nick Bromley
- 2008: Lachlan Renshaw
- 2009: Nick Bromley

- 2010: Lachlan Renshaw
- 2011: James Kaan
- 2012: Johnny Rayner
- 2013: Alexander Rowe
- 2014: Josh Ralph
- 2015: Jeff Riseley
- 2016: Luke Mathews
- 2017: Luke Mathews
- 2018: Luke Mathews
- 2019: Peter Bol
- 2020: Not held
- 2021: Peter Bol
- 2023: Riley McGown

== 1500 metres ==
Note: The mile run was held from 1930 until 1965, then was replaced by 1500. An additional mile championship returned between 1987 and 1993 (except 1990).

Mile run

- 1930: William Whyte
- 1932: Alex Hillhouse
- 1934: Fred Colman
- 1936: Gerald Backhouse
- 1937: Gerald Backhouse
- 1947: George Campbell
- 1948: John Marks
- 1949: John Marks
- 1950: Don MacMillan
- 1951: Don MacMillan
- 1952: Don MacMillan
- 1953: John Landy
- 1954: John Landy
- 1955: Don MacMillan
- 1956: John Landy
- 1957: Herb Elliott
- 1958: Herb Elliott
- 1959: Merv Lincoln
- 1960: Herb Elliott
- 1961: Trevor Vincent
- 1962: Albie Thomas
- 1963: Albie Thomas
- 1964: Albie Thomas
- 1965: Albie Thomas
- 1987: Glenn Ritchie
- 1988: Simon Doyle
- 1989: Simon Doyle
- 1991: Dean Paulin
- 1992: Andrew Lloyd
- 1993: Glenn Stojanovic

1500 metres

- 1966: Jim Grelle (USA)
- 1967: Laurie Toogood
- 1968: Peter Watson
- 1969: Graham Crouch

- 1970: Chris Fisher
- 1971: Chris Fisher
- 1972: Chris Fisher
- 1973: Peter Watson
- 1974: Randal Markey
- 1975: Ken Hall
- 1976: Peter Fuller
- 1977: Ken Hall
- 1978: Graham Crouch
- 1979: Steve Foley
- 1980: Michael Hillardt
- 1981: Steve Foley
- 1982: Michael Hillardt
- 1983: Michael Hillardt
- 1984: Michael Hillardt
- 1985: Michael Hillardt
- 1986: Michael Hillardt
- 1987: Michael Hillardt
- 1988: Michael Hillardt
- 1989: Dean Paulin
- 1990: Andrew Lloyd
- 1991: Simon Doyle
- 1992: Pat Scammell
- 1993: Simon Doyle
- 1994: Simon Doyle
- 1995: Darren Lynch
- 1996: Paul Bitok (KEN)
- 1997: Paul Bitok (KEN)
- 1998: Martin Keino (KEN)
- 1999: Paul Cleary
- 2000: William Chirchir (KEN)
- 2001: Clinton Mackevicius
- 2002: Craig Mottram
- 2003: Alastair Stevenson
- 2004: Youcef Abdi
- 2005: Lachlan Chisholm
- 2006: Mark Fountain
- 2007: Mitchell Kealey
- 2008: Mitchell Kealey
- 2009: Jeff Riseley

- 2010: Ryan Gregson
- 2011: Jeff Riseley
- 2012: Jeff Riseley
- 2013: James Kaan
- 2014: Jeff Riseley
- 2015: Jeff Riseley
- 2016: Ryan Gregson
- 2017: Ryan Gregson
- 2018: Ryan Gregson
- 2019: Luke Mathews

== 5000 metres ==
Note: 3 miles until 1966

- 1890: Not held
- 1891: Not held
- 1892: Not held
- 1893: Not held
- 1894: Charles Herbert
- 1895: Not held
- 1896: A. Bell (NZL)
- 1897: Not held
- 1898: William Cumming
- 1899: Not held
- 1900: P. Malthus (NZL)
- 1901: Not held
- 1902: William Simpson (NZL)
- 1903: Not held
- 1904: Rufus Ferguson
- 1905: Not held
- 1906: William Steele
- 1907: Not held
- 1908: G. Sharpe (NZL)
- 1909: Not held
- 1910: Miles Dickson (NZL)
- 1911: Not held
- 1912: George Hill (NZL)
- 1913: Not held
- 1914: James Beatson (NZL)
- 1915: Not held
- 1916: Not held
- 1917: Not held
- 1918: Not held
- 1919: Not held
- 1920: Harry Grandemange
- 1921: Not held
- 1922: Reg Webber (NZL)
- 1923: Not held
- 1924: Randolph Rose (NZL)
- 1925: Not held
- 1926: George Hyde
- 1927: Not held
- 1928: Randolph Rose (NZL)
- 1929: Not held

- 1930: George Hyde
- 1931: Not held
- 1932: Alex Hillhouse
- 1933: Not held
- 1934: Fred Colman
- 1935: Not held
- 1936: Jack Sheaves
- 1937: Not held
- 1938: Walter Weightman
- 1939: Not held
- 1940: Not held
- 1941: Not held
- 1942: Not held
- 1943: Not held
- 1944: Not held
- 1945: Not held
- 1946: Not held
- 1947: George Campbell
- 1948: Neville McDonald
- 1949: Neville McDonald
- 1950: Les Perry
- 1951: Les Perry
- 1952: Les Perry
- 1953: Les Perry
- 1954: Geoff Warren
- 1955: David Stephens
- 1956: John Landy
- 1957: Albie Thomas
- 1958: Albie Thomas
- 1959: Albie Thomas
- 1960: Dave Power
- 1961: Dave Power
- 1962: Dave Power
- 1963: Trevor Vincent
- 1964: Bill Baillie (NZL)
- 1965: Ron Clarke
- 1966: Ron Clarke
- 1967: Ron Clarke
- 1968: Ron Clarke
- 1969: Ron Clarke

- 1970: Tony Manning
- 1971: Kerry O'Brien
- 1972: Tony Benson
- 1973: Tony Williams
- 1974: David Fitzsimons
- 1975: Andrew Hill
- 1976: Graham Crouch
- 1977: David Fitzsimons
- 1978: David Fitzsimons
- 1979: David Fitzsimons
- 1980: Steve Austin
- 1981: Steve Austin
- 1982: Steve Austin
- 1983: Steve Austin
- 1984: Steve Foley
- 1985: Andrew Lloyd
- 1986: Malcolm Norwood
- 1987: Gerard Barrett
- 1988: Andrew Lloyd
- 1989: Phil Clode NZ
- 1990: Simon Doyle
- 1991: Rodney Higgins
- 1992: Andrew Lloyd
- 1993: Peter O'Donoghue
- 1994: Julian Paynter
- 1995: Shaun Creighton
- 1996: Shaun Creighton
- 1997: Julian Paynter
- 1998: Shaun Creighton
- 1999: Mizan Mehari
- 2000: Michael Power
- 2001: Michael Power
- 2002: Craig Mottram
- 2003: Michael Power
- 2004: Craig Mottram
- 2005: Craig Mottram
- 2006: Craig Mottram
- 2007: Craig Mottram
- 2008: Craig Mottram
- 2009: Collis Birmingham

- 2010: Ben St. Lawrence
- 2011: Bernard Lagat (USA)
- 2012: Harry Summers
- 2013: Cameron Page
- 2014: Collis Birmingham
- 2015: Brett Robinson
- 2016: Sam McEntee
- 2017: David McNeill
- 2018: Morgan McDonald

== 10,000 metres ==
Note: 6 miles until 1966

- 1950: Not held
- 1951: Not held
- 1952: Not held
- 1953: Geoff Warren
- 1954: Al Lawrence
- 1955: David Stephens
- 1956: Al Lawrence
- 1957: Geoff Warren
- 1958: Dave Power
- 1959: Dave Power
- 1960: Dave Power
- 1961: Bob Vagg
- 1962: Dave Power
- 1963: Tony Cook
- 1964: Tony Cook
- 1965: Geoff Walker
- 1966: Ron Clarke
- 1967: John Farrington
- 1968: Derek Clayton
- 1969: Ron Clarke
- 1970: Ron Clarke
- 1971: John Farrington
- 1972: Terry Harrison
- 1973: Brendan Layh
- 1974: Bill Scott
- 1975: Chris Wardlaw
- 1976: David Fitzsimons
- 1977: David Fitzsimons
- 1978: David Fitzsimons
- 1979: David Fitzsimons
- 1980: Steve Austin
- 1981: Lawrie Whitty
- 1982: Gerard Barrett
- 1983: Steve Austin
- 1984: Zeph Ncube (ZIM)
- 1985: Andrew Lloyd
- 1986: Robert de Castella
- 1987: Andrew Lloyd
- 1988: Steve Moneghetti
- 1989: Andrew Lloyd

- 1990: Jamie Harrison
- 1991: Jamie Harrison
- 1992: Jamie Harrison
- 1993: Rod Higgins
- 1994: Jamie Harrison
- 1995: Robbie Johnston (NZL)
- 1996: Not held
- 1997: Julian Paynter
- 1998: Luke Kipkosgei (KEN)
- 1999: Luke Kipkosgei (KEN)
- 2000: Joseph Kimani (KEN)
- 2001: Luke Kipkosgei (KEN)
- 2002: Shaun Creighton
- 2003: Shaun Creighton
- 2004: Lee Troop
- 2005: David Ruschena
- 2006: Andrew Letherby
- 2007: Galen Rupp (USA)
- 2008: Collis Birmingham
- 2009: David McNeill
- 2010: Collis Birmingham
- 2011: Josphat Menjo (KEN)
- 2012: Emmanuel Bett (KEN)
- 2013: Emmanuel Bett (KEN)
- 2014: Sam Chelanga (USA)
- 2015: Brett Robinson
- 2016: David McNeill
- 2017: Patrick Tiernan
- 2018: Stewart McSweyn

== Marathon ==
- 1900: Not held
- 1901: Not held
- 1902: Not held
- 1903: Not held
- 1904: Not held
- 1905: Not held
- 1906: Not held
- 1907: Not held
- 1908: Not held
- 1909: Andrew Wood
- 1910: Not held
- 1911: Not held
- 1912: Not held
- 1913: Not held
- 1914: Not held
- 1915: Not held
- 1916: Not held
- 1917: Not held
- 1918: Not held
- 1919: Not held
- 1920: Not held
- 1921: Not held
- 1922: Not held
- 1923: Not held
- 1924: Not held
- 1925: Not held
- 1926: Not held
- 1927: Bob McMurdo
- 1928: Not held
- 1929: Not held
- 1930: Not held
- 1931: Not held
- 1932: Not held
- 1933: Not held
- 1934: Not held
- 1935: Not held
- 1936: Not held
- 1937: Not held
- 1938: Not held
- 1939: Not held

- 1940: Not held
- 1941: Not held
- 1942: Not held
- 1943: Not held
- 1944: Not held
- 1945: Not held
- 1946: Not held
- 1947: Not held
- 1948: Not held
- 1949: Robert Prentice
- 1950: Not held
- 1951: Gordon Stanley
- 1952: Robert Prentice
- 1953: Roly Guy
- 1954: Not held
- 1955: Not held
- 1956: John Russell
- 1957: Not held
- 1958: John Russell
- 1959: Not held
- 1960: Ian Sinfield
- 1961: Not held
- 1962: Keith Ollerenshaw
- 1963: Not held
- 1964: Bob Vagg
- 1965: Not held
- 1966: Tony Cook
- 1967: Derek Clayton
- 1968: Derek Clayton
- 1969: John Farrington
- 1970: John Farrington
- 1971: Derek Clayton
- 1972: Bernard Vine
- 1973: Derek Clayton
- 1974: John Farrington
- 1975: John Farrington
- 1976: Vic Anderson
- 1977: Rob Wallace
- 1978: Jim Langford
- 1979: Robert de Castella

- 1980: Lawrie Whitty
- 1981: Garry Bentley
- 1982: Rob Wallace
- 1983: John Stanley
- 1984: Andrew Lloyd
- 1985: Grenville Wood
- 1986: Steve Austin
- 1987: Daniel Böltz
- 1988: Pat Carroll
- 1989: Brad Camp
- 1990: Allan Carman
- 1991: Sean Quilty
- 1992: Gerard Barrett
- 1993: Sean Quilty
- 1994: Michael Dalton
- 1995: Roderic deHighden
- 1996: Magnus Michelsson
- 1997: Pat Carroll
- 1998: Greg Lyons
- 1999: Shaun Creighton
- 2000: Roderic deHighden
- 2001: Damon Harris
- 2002: Jeremy Horne
- 2003: Paul Arthur
- 2004: Daniel Green
- 2005: Brett Cartwright
- 2006: Lee Troop
- 2007: Damon Harris
- 2008: Jeremy Horne
- 2009: Dale Engler
- 2010: Rowan Walker
- 2011: Peter Nowill
- 2012: Scott Westcott
- 2013: Alexander Matthews
- 2014: Rowan Walker
- 2015: Robert Pope
- 2016: Thomas Do Canto

== 110 metres hurdles ==
Note: 120 yard hurdles until 1966

- 1890: Not held
- 1891: Not held
- 1892: Not held
- 1893: Not held
- 1894: Harry Davis
- 1895: Not held
- 1896: W. Martin (NZL)
- 1897: Not held
- 1898: J. Laidlaw
- 1899: Not held
- 1900: Corrie Gardner
- 1901: Not held
- 1902: George William Smith (NZL)
- 1903: Not held
- 1904: George William Smith (NZL)
- 1905: Not held
- 1906: Colin Stewart
- 1907: Not held
- 1908: John Davis and Colin Stewart (tie)
- 1909: Not held
- 1910: Gerald Keddell (NZL)
- 1911: Not held
- 1912: Gerald Keddell (NZL)
- 1913: Not held
- 1914: Les Wallman
- 1915: Not held
- 1916: Not held
- 1917: Not held
- 1918: Not held
- 1919: Not held
- 1920: Harry Wilson (NZL)
- 1921: Not held
- 1922: Leslie Edmunds
- 1923: Not held
- 1924: Robert Almond
- 1925: Not held
- 1926: Ernest Scott
- 1927: Not held
- 1928: Roger Lander (NZL)
- 1929: Not held

- 1930: Alf Watson
- 1931: Not held
- 1932: Alf Watson
- 1933: Not held
- 1934: Don McLardy
- 1935: Not held
- 1936: Sid Stenner
- 1937: Not held
- 1938: Sid Stenner
- 1939: Not held
- 1940: Not held
- 1941: Not held
- 1942: Not held
- 1943: Not held
- 1944: Not held
- 1945: Not held
- 1946: Not held
- 1947: Charles Green
- 1948: Ray Weinberg
- 1949: Peter Gardner
- 1950: Ray Weinberg
- 1951: Ray Weinberg
- 1952: Ray Weinberg
- 1953: Ray Weinberg
- 1954: Ken Doubleday
- 1955: Ken Doubleday
- 1956: Ken Doubleday
- 1957: John Chittick
- 1958: John Chittick
- 1959: John Chittick
- 1960: John Chittick
- 1961: Dave Prince
- 1962: Dave Prince
- 1963: Dave Prince
- 1964: Dave Prince
- 1965: Gary Knoke
- 1966: Richmond Flowers (USA)
- 1967: Gary Knoke
- 1968: David James
- 1969: Mal Baird

- 1970: Mal Baird
- 1971: Mal Baird
- 1972: Mal Baird
- 1973: Warren Parr
- 1974: Warren Parr
- 1975: Max Binnington
- 1976: Warren Parr
- 1977: Vin Plant
- 1978: Vin Plant
- 1979: Max Binnington
- 1980: Warren Parr
- 1981: Max Binnington
- 1982: Max Binnington
- 1983: Don Wright
- 1984: Don Wright
- 1985: Don Wright
- 1986: Don Wright
- 1987: Don Wright
- 1988: Don Wright
- 1989: Don Wright
- 1990: John Caliguri
- 1991: John Caliguri
- 1992: Kyle Vander Kuyp
- 1993: Kyle Vander Kuyp
- 1994: Kyle Vander Kuyp
- 1995: Colin Jackson (GBR)
- 1996: Kyle Vander Kuyp
- 1997: Kyle Vander Kuyp
- 1998: Kyle Vander Kuyp
- 1999: Kyle Vander Kuyp
- 2000: Tim Ewan
- 2001: Kyle Vander Kuyp
- 2002: Colin Jackson (GBR)
- 2003: Kyle Vander Kuyp
- 2004: Kyle Vander Kuyp
- 2005: James Mortimer (NZL)
- 2006: James Mortimer (NZL)
- 2007: Justin Merlino
- 2008: Justin Merlino
- 2009: Tasuku Tanonaka (JPN)

- 2010: Greg Eyears
- 2011: Siddhanth Thingalaya (IND)
- 2012: Siddhanth Thingalaya (IND)
- 2013: Siddhanth Thingalaya (IND)
- 2014: Nicholas Hough
- 2015: Nicholas Hough
- 2016: Justin Merlino
- 2017: Nicholas Hough
- 2018: Nicholas Hough
- 2023: Mitchell Lightfoot

== 400 metres hurdles ==
Note: 440 yard hurdles until 1966

- 1890: Not held
- 1891: Not held
- 1892: Not held
- 1893: Not held
- 1894: David Matson (NZL)
- 1895: Not held
- 1896: W. Martin (NZL)
- 1897: Not held
- 1898: Arthur Holder (NZL)
- 1899: Not held
- 1900: George William Smith (NZL)
- 1901: Not held
- 1902: George William Smith (NZL)
- 1903: Not held
- 1904: George William Smith (NZL)
- 1905: Not held
- 1906: Frank Brown
- 1907: Not held
- 1908: Henry St Aubyn Murray (NZL)
- 1909: Not held
- 1910: Gerald Keddell (NZL)
- 1911: Not held
- 1912: Gerald Keddell (NZL)
- 1913: Not held
- 1914: Russell Watson
- 1915: Not held
- 1916: Not held
- 1917: Not held
- 1918: Not held
- 1919: Not held
- 1920: Leslie Edmunds
- 1921: Not held
- 1922: Francis Edwards
- 1923: Not held
- 1924: Richard Honner
- 1925: Not held
- 1926: Alf Watson
- 1927: Not held
- 1928: Stan Ramson (NZL)
- 1929: Not held

- 1930: Alf Watson
- 1931: Not held
- 1932: George Golding
- 1933: Not held
- 1934: George Golding
- 1935: Not held
- 1936: Alf Watson
- 1937: Not held
- 1938: Paul Magee
- 1939: Not held
- 1940: Not held
- 1941: Not held
- 1942: Not held
- 1943: Not held
- 1944: Not held
- 1945: Not held
- 1946: Not held
- 1947: Charles Green
- 1948: Geoff Goodacre
- 1949: Geoff Goodacre
- 1950: Geoff Goodacre
- 1951: Geoff Goodacre
- 1952: Ken Doubleday
- 1953: Ken Doubleday
- 1954: David Lean
- 1955: Geoff Goodacre
- 1956: Geoff Goodacre
- 1957: Geoff Goodacre
- 1958: Ron Carter
- 1959: Barry Stanton
- 1960: Barry Stanton
- 1961: Barry Stanton
- 1962: Ken Roche
- 1963: Ken Roche
- 1964: Michael Ryan
- 1965: Gary Knoke
- 1966: Gary Knoke
- 1967: Gary Knoke
- 1968: Geoff McNamara
- 1969: Bill Hooker

- 1970: Gary Knoke
- 1971: Gary Knoke
- 1972: Gary Knoke
- 1973: Gary Knoke
- 1974: Bruce Field
- 1975: Max Binnington
- 1976: Don Hanly
- 1977: Peter Grant
- 1978: Gary Cox
- 1979: Peter Grant
- 1980: Garry Brown
- 1981: Garry Brown
- 1982: Garry Brown
- 1983: Peter Rwamuhanda (UGA)
- 1984: Dale Horrobin
- 1985: Ken Gordon
- 1986: Ken Gordon
- 1987: Ken Gordon
- 1988: Leigh Miller
- 1989: Leigh Miller
- 1990: Leigh Miller
- 1991: Rohan Robinson
- 1992: Rohan Robinson
- 1993: Syunji Karube (JPN)
- 1994: Nick Ward
- 1995: Rohan Robinson
- 1996: Rohan Robinson
- 1997: Rohan Robinson
- 1998: Rohan Robinson
- 1999: Dai Tamesue (JPN)
- 2000: Rohan Robinson
- 2001: Blair Young
- 2002: Oliver Jean-Theodore (FRA)
- 2003: Michael Hazel
- 2004: Elliott Wood
- 2005: Nicholas O'Brien (NZL)
- 2006: Brendan Cole
- 2007: LaBronze Garrett (USA)
- 2008: Tristan Thomas
- 2009: Tristan Thomas

- 2010: Brendan Cole
- 2011: Brendan Cole
- 2012: Tristan Thomas
- 2013: Tristan Thomas
- 2014: Ian Dewhurst
- 2015: Cameron French (NZL)
- 2016: Keisuke Nozawa (JPN)
- 2017: Ian Dewhurst
- 2018: Ian Dewhurst

== 3000 metres steeplechase ==
- 1950: Not held
- 1951: Not held
- 1952: Not held
- 1953: Not held
- 1954: Not held
- 1955: Not held
- 1956: Not held
- 1957: Not held
- 1958: Graham Thomas
- 1959: Graham Thomas
- 1960: Robert Morgan-Morris
- 1961: Trevor Vincent
- 1962: Trevor Vincent
- 1963: Ron Blackney
- 1964: Trevor Vincent
- 1965: Trevor Vincent
- 1966: Kerry O'Brien
- 1967: Kerry O'Brien
- 1968: Peter Welsh (NZL)
- 1969: Kerry O'Brien
- 1970: Kerry O'Brien
- 1971: Kerry O'Brien
- 1972: Kerry O'Brien
- 1973: Kerry O'Brien
- 1974: Fred Langford
- 1975: Bob Walczak
- 1976: Peter Larkins
- 1977: Peter Larkins
- 1978: Peter Larkins
- 1979: Peter Larkins
- 1980: Peter Larkins
- 1981: Peter Larkins
- 1982: Gary Zeuner
- 1983: Peter Larkins
- 1984: Gary Zeuner
- 1985: Wayne Dyer
- 1986: Gary Zeuner
- 1987: Mike Inwood
- 1988: Brendan Hewitt
- 1989: Mike Inwood

- 1990: Patrick Woods
- 1991: Shaun Creighton
- 1992: Shaun Creighton
- 1993: Shaun Creighton
- 1994: Shaun Creighton
- 1995: Chris Unthank
- 1996: Chris Unthank
- 1997: Chris Unthank
- 1998: Chris Unthank
- 1999: Martin Dent
- 2000: Chris Unthank
- 2001: Peter Nowill
- 2002: Peter Nowill
- 2003: Peter Nowill
- 2004: Peter Nowill
- 2005: Peter Nowill
- 2006: Youcef Abdi
- 2007: Peter Nowill
- 2008: Martin Dent
- 2009: Youcef Abdi
- 2010: Youcef Abdi
- 2011: Youcef Abdi
- 2012: Peter Nowill
- 2013: James Nipperess
- 2014: James Nipperess
- 2015: Craig Appleby
- 2016: James Nipperess
- 2017: Hashim Salah Abbas (QAT)
- 2018: James Nipperess

== 20 kilometre road walk ==
- 1960: Not held
- 1961: Not held
- 1962: Not held
- 1963: Noel Freeman
- 1964: Not held
- 1965: Bob Gardiner
- 1966: Not held
- 1967: Frank Clark
- 1968: Not held
- 1969: Frank Clark
- 1970: Noel Freeman
- 1971: Not held
- 1972: Peter Fullager
- 1973: Not held
- 1974: Peter Fullager
- 1975: Not held
- 1976: Willi Sawall
- 1977: Not held
- 1978: Willi Sawall
- 1979: Not held
- 1980: Peter Fullager
- 1981: Not held
- 1982: Willi Sawall
- 1983: Dave Smith
- 1984: Dave Smith
- 1985: Simon Baker
- 1986: Not held
- 1987: Dave Smith
- 1988: Simon Baker
- 1989: Rod Huxley
- 1990: Andrew Jachno
- 1991: Dave Smith
- 1992: Robert McFadden
- 1993: Paul Copeland
- 1994: Not held
- 1995: Nick A'hern
- 1996: Nick A'hern
- 1997: Nick A'hern
- 1998: Nick A'hern
- 1999: Dion Russell

- 2000: Nathan Deakes
- 2001: Nathan Deakes
- 2002: Nathan Deakes
- 2003: Luke Adams
- 2004: Nathan Deakes
- 2005: Nathan Deakes
- 2006: Nathan Deakes
- 2007: Luke Adams
- 2008: Jared Tallent
- 2009: Jared Tallent
- 2010: Jared Tallent
- 2011: Jared Tallent
- 2012: Jared Tallent
- 2013: Jared Tallent
- 2014: Dane Bird-Smith
- 2015: Jared Tallent
- 2016: Dane Bird-Smith
- 2017: Dane Bird-Smith

== 50 kilometres race walk ==
- 1950: Not held
- 1951: Not held
- 1952: Len Chadwick
- 1953: Not held
- 1954: Les Hellyer
- 1955: Not held
- 1956: Norman Read (NZL)
- 1957: Not held
- 1958: Ted Allsopp
- 1959: Not held
- 1960: Noel Freeman
- 1961: Not held
- 1962: Ted Allsopp
- 1963: Not held
- 1964: Bob Gardiner
- 1965: Not held
- 1966: Bob Gardiner
- 1967: Not held
- 1968: Bob Gardiner
- 1969: Not held
- 1970: Ted Allsopp
- 1971: Bob Gardiner
- 1972: Not held
- 1973: Robin Whyte
- 1974: Not held
- 1975: Tim Erickson
- 1976: Not held
- 1977: Willi Sawall
- 1978: Not held
- 1979: Bruce Cook
- 1980: Not held
- 1981: Willi Sawall
- 1982: Not held
- 1983: Keith Knox
- 1984: Andrew Jachno
- 1985: Mark Dossetor
- 1986: Willi Sawall
- 1987: Steve Hausfeld
- 1988: Michael Harvey
- 1989: Simon Baker

- 1990: Michael Harvey
- 1991: Darius Wojcik
- 1992: Willi Sawall
- 1993: Michael Harvey
- 1994: Michael Harvey
- 1995: Duane Cousins
- 1996: Michael Harvey
- 1997: Dion Russell
- 1998: Dion Russell
- 1999: Dion Russell
- Dead-heat with Nathan Deakes
- 2000: Not held
- 2001: Liam Murphy
- 2002: Liam Murphy
- 2003: Duane Cousins
- 2004: Chris Erickson
- 2005: Nathan Deakes
- 2006: Nathan Deakes
- 2007: Jared Tallent
- 2008: Chris Erickson
- 2009: Jared Tallent
- 2010: Luke Adams
- 2011: Jared Tallent
- 2012: Luke Adams
- 2013: No finishers
- 2014: Chris Erickson
- 2015: Evan Dunfee (CAN)
- 2016: Matthew Griggs

== Pole vault ==
- 1890: Not held
- 1891: Not held
- 1892: Not held
- 1893: Not held
- 1894: J. Gleeson
- 1895: Not held
- 1896: H. Kinglsey (NZL)
- 1897: Not held
- 1898: Hori Eruera (NZL)
- 1899: Not held
- 1900: James Te Paa (NZL)
- 1901: Not held
- 1902: Charles Laurie (NZL)
- 1903: Not held
- 1904: Charles Laurie (NZL)
- 1905: Not held
- 1906: R. Adams
- 1907: Not held
- 1908: Len McKay (NZL)
- 1909: Not held
- 1910: Leo Walker and Len McKay (NZL)
- 1911: Not held
- 1912: Jack Brake
- 1913: Not held
- 1914: Jack Brake and Richard Templeton (USA)
- 1915: Not held
- 1916: Not held
- 1917: Not held
- 1918: Not held
- 1919: Not held
- 1920: George Harvey (NZL)
- 1921: Not held
- 1922: Roy Harbison
- 1923: Not held
- 1924: Roy Harbison
- 1925: Not held
- 1926: Norman Shaddock
- 1927: Not held
- 1928: Eino Keskinen
- 1929: Not held

- 1930: Gordon Harper
- 1931: Not held
- 1932: Fred Woodhouse
- 1933: Not held
- 1934: Fred Woodhouse
- 1935: Not held
- 1936: Fred Woodhouse
- 1937: Not held
- 1938: Les Fletcher
- 1939: Not held
- 1940: Not held
- 1941: Not held
- 1942: Not held
- 1943: Not held
- 1944: Not held
- 1945: Not held
- 1946: Not held
- 1947: Ted Winter
- 1948: Ted Winter
- 1949: Peter Denton
- 1950: Peter Denton
- 1951: Bruce Peever
- 1952: Peter Denton
- 1953: Peter Denton
- 1954: Bruce Peever
- 1955: Bruce Peever
- 1956: Bruce Peever
- 1957: Max Gee
- 1958: Bruce Peever
- 1959: John Pfitzner
- 1960: Ross Filshie
- 1961: John Pfitzner
- 1962: Ross Filshie
- 1963: Trevor Bickle
- 1964: Ross Filshie
- 1965: Ross Filshie
- 1966: Trevor Bickle
- 1967: Trevor Bickle
- 1968: Mike Sullivan
- 1969: Ed Johnson

- 1970: Ray Boyd
- 1971: Ed Johnson
- 1972: Ray Boyd
- 1973: Ray Boyd
- 1974: Ray Boyd
- 1975: Ray Boyd
- 1976: Ray Boyd
- 1977: Rob Huddle
- 1978: Ray Boyd
- 1979: Ray Boyd
- 1980: Ray Boyd
- 1981: Ray Boyd
- 1982: Ray Boyd
- 1983: Ray Boyd
- 1984: Rob Chisholm
- 1985: Neil Honey
- 1986: Larry Jessee (USA)
- 1987: Neil Honey
- 1988: Neil Honey
- 1989: Simon Arkell
- 1990: Tim Foster
- 1991: Simon Arkell
- 1992: Simon Arkell
- 1993: Jimmy Miller
- 1994: Jimmy Miller
- Tie with Scott Huffman (USA)
- 1995: Jimmy Miller
- 1996: Jimmy Miller
- 1997: Jimmy Miller
- 1998: Dmitri Markov
- 1999: Viktor Chistiakov
- 2000: Paul Burgess
- 2001: Dmitri Markov
- 2002: Paul Burgess
- 2003: Dmitri Markov
- 2004: Dmitri Markov
- 2005: Paul Burgess
- 2006: Paul Burgess
- 2007: Brad Walker (USA)
- 2008: Steve Hooker
- 2009: Blake Lucas

- 2010: Steven Hooker
- 2011: Sergey Kucheryanu (RUS)
- 2012: Joel Pocklington
- 2013: Joel Pocklington
- 2014: Joel Pocklington
- 2015: Angus Armstrong
- 2016: Kurtis Marschall
- 2017: Kurtis Marschall
- 2018: Kurtis Marschall

== High jump ==
- 1890: Not held
- 1891: Not held
- 1892: Not held
- 1893: Not held
- 1894: William Cole
- 1895: Not held
- 1896: James Doyle
- 1897: Not held
- 1898: Patrick English
- 1899: Not held
- 1900: Patrick English
- 1901: Not held
- 1902: Charles Laurie (NZL)
- 1903: Not held
- 1904: Patrick English
- 1905: Not held
- 1906: Tim Frawley
- 1907: Not held
- 1908: Charles Orbell (NZL)
- 1909: Not held
- 1910: Jock Smith
- 1911: Not held
- 1912: Lester Kelly
- 1913: Not held
- 1914: Lester Kelly
- 1915: Not held
- 1916: Not held
- 1917: Not held
- 1918: Not held
- 1919: Not held
- 1920: Harold Harbison
- 1921: Not held
- 1922: Roy Harbison
- 1923: Not held
- 1924: Laurence Mason
- 1925: Not held
- 1926: Laurence Mason
- 1927: Not held
- 1928: Ewen Davidson
- 1929: Not held

- 1930: Charles Spicer
- 1931: Not held
- 1932: Jim Watson
- 1933: Not held
- 1934: Douglas Shetliffe
- 1935: Not held
- 1936: Douglas Shetliffe
- 1937: Not held
- 1938: Douglas Shetliffe
- 1939: Not held
- 1940: Not held
- 1941: Not held
- 1942: Not held
- 1943: Not held
- 1944: Not held
- 1945: Not held
- 1946: Not held
- 1947: John Winter
- 1948: John Winter
- 1949: Peter Mullins
- 1950: John Winter
- 1951: Georges Damitio (FRA)
- 1952: Mervyn Peter
- 1953: John Vernon
- 1954: John Vernon
- 1955: Chilla Porter
- 1956: Chilla Porter
- 1957: Chilla Porter
- 1958: Chilla Porter
- 1959: Chilla Porter
- 1960: Chilla Porter
- 1961: Chilla Porter
- 1962: Percy Hobson
- 1963: Tony Sneazwell
- 1964: Tony Sneazwell
- 1965: Lawrie Peckham
- 1966: Lawrie Peckham
- 1967: Lawrie Peckham
- 1968: Tony Sneazwell
- 1969: Lawrie Peckham

- 1970: Lawrie Peckham
- 1971: Lawrie Peckham
- 1972: Lawrie Peckham
- 1973: Lawrie Peckham
- 1974: Lawrie Peckham
- 1975: Lawrie Peckham
- 1976: Gordon Windeyer
- 1977: Gordon Windeyer
- 1978: Gordon Windeyer
- 1979: Michael Dick
- 1980: David Morrow
- 1981: David Hoyle
- 1982: Larry Sayers
- 1983: Mark Barratt
- 1984: John Atkinson
- 1985: Michael Allen
- 1986: Lee Balkin (USA)
- 1987: Marc Howard
- 1988: David Anderson
- 1989: Ian Garrett
- 1990: David Anderson
- 1991: Tim Forsyth
- 1992: Tim Forsyth
- 1993: Tim Forsyth
- 1994: Tim Forsyth
- 1995: Simon Wojcik
- 1996: Chris Anderson
- 1997: Tim Forsyth
- 1998: Tim Forsyth
- 1999: Ron Garlett
- 2000: Nick Moroney
- 2001: Nick Moroney
- 2002: Nick Moroney
- 2003: Joshua Lodge
- 2004: Nick Moroney
- 2005: Nick Moroney
- 2006: Nick Moroney
- 2007: Liam Zamel-Paez
- 2008: Cal Pearce
- 2009: Liam Zamel-Paez

- 2010: Liam Zamel-Paez
- 2011: Chris Armet
- 2012: Nick Moroney
- 2013: Brandon Starc
- 2014: Nik Bojic
- 2015: Brandon Starc
- 2016: Nauraj Singh Randhawa (MAS)
- 2017: Lee Hup Wei (MAS)
- 2018: Brandon Starc
- 2022: Yual Reath

== Long jump ==
- 1890: Not held
- 1891: Not held
- 1892: Not held
- 1893: Not held
- 1894: William Cole
- 1895: Not held
- 1896: J. Ryan (NZL)
- 1897: Not held
- 1898: David Bevan
- 1899: Not held
- 1900: Patrick English
- 1901: Not held
- 1902: Herb Hunter
- 1903: Not held
- 1904: Harry Duigan
- 1905: Not held
- 1906: Nigel Barker
- 1907: Not held
- 1908: John Davis
- 1909: Not held
- 1910: Jock Smith
- 1911: Not held
- 1912: Ethelbert Southee
- 1913: Not held
- 1914: Jock Smith
- 1915: Not held
- 1916: Not held
- 1917: Not held
- 1918: Not held
- 1919: Not held
- 1920: Richard Honner
- 1921: Not held
- 1922: Richard Honner
- 1923: Not held
- 1924: Richard Honner
- 1925: Not held
- 1926: Hubert Day
- 1927: Not held
- 1928: Charles Ebert
- 1929: Not held

- 1930: Carl Mahon
- 1931: Not held
- 1932: Hubert Day
- 1933: Not held
- 1934: Adrian Button
- 1935: Not held
- 1936: Jack Lobban
- 1937: Not held
- 1938: Basil Dickinson
- 1939: Not held
- 1940: Not held
- 1941: Not held
- 1942: Not held
- 1943: Not held
- 1944: Not held
- 1945: Not held
- 1946: Not held
- 1947: Bill Bruce
- 1948: Bill Bruce
- 1949: Bill Bruce
- 1950: Bill Bruce
- 1951: Hugh Jack
- 1952: Peter Cox
- 1953: Brian Oliver
- 1954: Hector Hogan
- 1955: Ian Bruce
- 1956: Brian Oliver
- 1957: Hugh Jack
- 1958: Jim McCann
- 1959: Maurice Rich
- 1960: Bevyn Baker
- 1961: Allen Crawley
- 1962: John Baguley
- 1963: Ian Tomlinson
- 1964: Murray Tolbert
- 1965: Phil May
- 1966: Leonid Barkovskyy (URS)
- 1967: Allen Crawley
- 1968: Gayle Hopkins (USA)
- 1969: Phil May

- 1970: Phil May
- 1971: Phil May
- 1972: Murray Tolbert
- 1973: Chris Commons
- 1974: Chris Commons
- 1975: Chris Commons
- 1976: Chris Commons
- 1977: Fred Holpen
- 1978: Steven Knott
- 1979: Gary Honey
- 1980: Ian Campbell
- 1981: Gary Honey
- 1982: Gary Honey
- 1983: Gary Honey
- 1984: Gary Honey
- 1985: Gary Honey
- 1986: Gary Honey
- 1987: Gary Honey
- 1988: Gary Honey
- 1989: Gary Honey
- 1990: David Culbert
- 1991: Jonathon Moyle (NZL)
- 1992: David Culbert
- 1993: Mike Powell (USA)
- 1994: Jai Taurima
- 1995: Craig Furber
- 1996: Jai Taurima
- 1997: Shane Hair
- 1998: Shane Hair
- 1999: Shane Hair
- 2000: Peter Burge
- 2001: Peter Burge
- 2002: Tim Parravicini
- 2003: Peter Burge
- 2004: Shane Hai
- 2005: Chris Noffke
- 2006: Fabrice Lapierre
- 2007: Tim Parravicini
- 2008: Robert Crowther
- 2009: Fabrice Lapierre

- 2010: Fabrice Lapierre
- 2011: Mitchell Watt
- 2012: Frederic Erin (FRA)
- 2013: Fabrice Lapierre
- 2014: Robert Crowther
- 2015: Robert Crowther
- 2016: Fabrice Lapierre
- 2017: Christopher Mitrevski
- 2018: Christopher Mitrevski

== Triple jump ==
- 1920: Not held
- 1921: Not held
- 1922: Not held
- 1923: Not held
- 1924: Not held
- 1925: Not held
- 1926: Not held
- 1927: Not held
- 1928: John Shirley (NZL)
- 1929: Not held
- 1930: Nick Winter
- 1931: Not held
- 1932: Frank Campbell
- 1933: Not held
- 1934: Basil Dickinson
- 1935: Not held
- 1936: Basil Dickinson
- 1937: Not held
- 1938: Jack Metcalfe
- 1939: Not held
- 1940: Not held
- 1941: Not held
- 1942: Not held
- 1943: Not held
- 1944: Not held
- 1945: Not held
- 1946: Not held
- 1947: Ken Doubleday
- 1948: George Avery
- 1949: Frank Day
- 1950: Les McKeand
- 1951: Peter Cox
- 1952: Kevin Miller
- 1953: Brian Oliver
- 1954: Brian Oliver
- 1955: Kevin Salt
- 1956: Brian Oliver
- 1957: Ian Tomlinson
- 1958: Ian Tomlinson
- 1959: Ian Tomlinson

- 1960: John Baguley
- 1961: John Baguley
- 1962: Ian Tomlinson
- 1963: Graham Boase
- 1964: Ian Tomlinson
- 1965: Ian Tomlinson
- 1966: Phil May
- 1967: Phil May
- 1968: Phil May
- 1969: Phil May
- 1970: Mick McGrath
- 1971: Phil May
- 1972: Mick McGrath
- 1973: Phil May
- 1974: Mick McGrath
- 1975: Mick McGrath
- 1976: Don Commons
- 1977: Don Commons
- 1978: Mick McGrath
- 1979: Ian Campbell
- 1980: Ken Lorraway
- 1981: Ken Lorraway
- 1982: Ken Lorraway
- 1983: Ken Lorraway
- 1984: Ken Lorraway
- 1985: Peter Beames
- 1986: Peter Beames
- 1987: Peter Beames
- 1988: Peter Beames
- 1989: Matt Sweeney
- 1990: Andrew Murphy
- 1991: Matt Sweeney
- 1992: Matt Sweeney
- 1993: Peter Burge
- 1994: Andrew Murphy
- 1995: Andrew Murphy
- 1996: Andrew Murphy
- 1997: Andrew Murphy
- 1998: Larry Achike (GBR)
- 1999: Andrew Murphy

- 2000: Rogel Nachum (ISR)
- 2001: Andrew Murphy
- 2002: Andrew Murphy
- 2003: Andrew Murphy
- 2004: Andrew Murphy
- 2005: Michael Perry
- 2006: Andrew Murphy
- 2007: Alwyn Jones
- 2008: Alwyn Jones
- 2009: Alwyn Jones
- 2010: Henry Frayne
- 2011: Adam Rabone
- 2012: Alwyn Jones
- 2013: Alwyn Jones
- 2014: Phillips Idowu (GBR)
- 2015: Alwyn Jones
- 2016: Alwyn Jones
- 2017: Ryoma Yamamoto (JPN)
- 2018: Emmanuel Fakiye

== Shot put ==
- 1890: Not held
- 1891: Not held
- 1892: Not held
- 1893: Not held
- 1894: Timothy O'Connor (NZL)
- 1895: Not held
- 1896: W. Rhodes (NZL)
- 1897: Not held
- 1898: Patrick English
- 1899: Not held
- 1900: George Hawkes
- 1901: Not held
- 1902: Bill O'Reilly
- 1903: Not held
- 1904: Bill O'Reilly
- 1905: Not held
- 1906: Bill O'Reilly
- 1907: Not held
- 1908: Bill O'Reilly
- 1909: Not held
- 1910: Bill O'Reilly
- 1911: Not held
- 1912: Dan McGrath
- 1913: Not held
- 1914: Edgar Caughey (USA)
- 1915: Not held
- 1916: Not held
- 1917: Not held
- 1918: Not held
- 1919: Not held
- 1920: Patrick Munro (NZL)
- 1921: Not held
- 1922: Leslie Rouse
- 1923: Not held
- 1924: Patrick Munro (NZL)
- 1925: Not held
- 1926: Alex McIntosh
- 1927: Not held
- 1928: Patrick Munro (NZL)
- 1929: Not held

- 1930: Alex McIntosh
- 1931: Not held
- 1932: Alex McIntosh
- 1933: Not held
- 1934: William Mackenzie
- 1935: Not held
- 1936: Harry Wilson
- 1937: Not held
- 1938: William Mackenzie
- 1939: Not held
- 1940: Not held
- 1941: Not held
- 1942: Not held
- 1943: Not held
- 1944: Not held
- 1945: Not held
- 1946: Not held
- 1947: Arch Howie
- 1948: Trevor Evans
- 1949: Trevor Evans
- 1950: Peter Mullins
- 1951: Trevor Evans
- 1952: Peter Hanlin
- 1953: Peter Hanlin
- 1954: Peter Hanlin
- 1955: Peter Hanlin
- 1956: Peter Hanlin
- 1957: Peter Hanlin
- 1958: Peter Hanlin
- 1959: James Penfold
- 1960: Warwick Selvey
- 1961: Warwick Selvey
- 1962: Warwick Selvey
- 1963: Warwick Selvey
- 1964: Warwick Selvey
- 1965: Merv Kemp
- 1966: Warwick Selvey
- 1967: Warwick Selvey
- 1968: Jay Silvester (USA)
- 1969: Ray Rigby

- 1970: Peter Phillips
- 1971: Peter Phillips
- 1972: Ray Rigby
- 1973: Ray Rigby
- 1974: Mike Barry
- 1975: Merv Kemp
- 1976: Alex Brown
- 1977: Peter Taylor
- 1978: Wayne Martin
- 1979: Ray Rigby
- 1980: Matt Barber
- 1981: Phil Nettle
- 1982: Matt Barber
- 1983: Ray Rigby
- 1984: Ray Rigby
- 1985: Stuart Gyngell
- 1986: Stuart Gyngell
- 1987: John Minns
- 1988: John Minns
- 1989: John Minns
- 1990: Craig Watson
- 1991: Werner Reiterer
- 1992: Craig Watson
- 1993: John Minns
- 1994: John Minns
- 1995: John Minns
- 1996: Pavol Pankuch (SVK)
- 1997: Clay Cross
- 1998: Justin Anlezark
- 1999: Clay Cross
- 2000: Justin Anlezark
- 2001: Justin Anlezark
- 2002: Justin Anlezark
- 2003: Justin Anlezark
- 2004: Justin Anlezark
- 2005: Clay Cross
- 2006: Scott Martin
- 2007: Christian Cantwell (USA)
- 2008: Justin Anlezark
- 2009: Justin Anlezark

- 2010: Scott Martin
- 2011: Dale Stevenson
- 2012: Emanuele Fuamatu
- 2013: Damien Birkinhead
- 2014: Damien Birkinhead
- 2015: Jacko Gill (NZL)
- 2016: Matthew Cowie
- 2017: Damien Birkinhead
- 2018: Damien Birkinhead

== Discus ==
- 1920: Not held
- 1921: Not held
- 1922: A. West
- 1923: Not held
- 1924: Patrick Munro (NZL)
- 1925: Not held
- 1926: Roy Thomson
- 1927: Not held
- 1928: Patrick Munro (NZL)
- 1929: Not held
- 1930: Joe Watson
- 1931: Not held
- 1932: John Wallace
- 1933: Not held
- 1934: William Mackenzie
- 1935: Not held
- 1936: Harry Wilson
- 1937: Not held
- 1938: Keith Pardon
- 1939: Not held
- 1940: Not held
- 1941: Not held
- 1942: Not held
- 1943: Not held
- 1944: Not held
- 1945: Not held
- 1946: Not held
- 1947: Keith Pardon
- 1948: Ian Reed
- 1949: Ian Reed
- 1950: Ian Reed
- 1951: Keith Pardon
- 1952: Keith Pardon
- 1953: Keith Pardon
- 1954: Ian Reed
- 1955: Anthony Kenk
- 1956: Charles Rann
- 1957: Ves Balodis
- 1958: Ves Balodis
- 1959: Ves Balodis

- 1960: Warwick Selvey
- 1961: Harry Mitsilias
- 1962: Warwick Selvey
- 1963: Warwick Selvey
- 1964: Warwick Selvey
- 1965: Warwick Selvey
- 1966: Warwick Selvey
- 1967: Warwick Selvey
- 1968: Jay Silvester (USA)
- 1969: Len Vlahov
- 1970: Warwick Selvey
- 1971: Warwick Selvey
- 1972: Warwick Selvey
- 1973: Warwick Selvey
- 1974: Dick Priman
- 1975: Len Vlahov
- 1976: Merv Kemp
- 1977: Dick Priman
- 1978: Wayne Martin
- 1979: James Howard (USA)
- 1980: Phil Nettle
- 1981: Phil Nettle
- 1982: Vlad Slavnic
- 1983: Paul Nandapi
- 1984: Paul Nandapi
- 1985: Paul Nandapi
- 1986: Paul Nandapi
- 1987: Paul Nandapi
- 1988: Werner Reiterer
- 1989: Werner Reiterer
- 1990: Werner Reiterer
- 1991: Werner Reiterer
- 1992: Werner Reiterer
- 1993: Werner Reiterer
- 1994: Werner Reiterer
- 1995: Werner Reiterer
- 1996: Justin Anlezark
- 1997: Gerard Duffy
- 1998: Ian Winchester (NZL)
- 1999: Gerard Duffy

- 2000: Ian Winchester (NZL)
- 2001: Aaron Neighbour
- 2002: Peter Elvy
- 2003: Peter Elvy
- 2004: Scott Martin
- 2005: Scott Martin
- 2006: Scott Martin
- 2007: Benn Harradine
- 2008: Benn Harradine
- 2009: Bertrand Vili (FRA)
- 2010: Benn Harradine
- 2011: Benn Harradine
- 2012: Benn Harradine
- 2013: Julian Wruck
- 2014: Benn Harradine
- 2015: Julian Wruck
- 2016: Matthew Denny
- 2017: Julian Wruck
- 2018: Matthew Denny

== Hammer throw ==
- 1890: Not held
- 1891: Not held
- 1892: Not held
- 1893: Not held
- 1894: Timothy O'Connor
- 1895: Not held
- 1896: R. Martin (NZL)
- 1897: Not held
- 1898: J. Milward
- 1899: Not held
- 1900: W. Madill (NZL)
- 1901: Not held
- 1902: Bill O'Reilly
- 1903: Not held
- 1904: Bill O'Reilly
- 1905: Not held
- 1906: Bill O'Reilly
- 1907: Not held
- 1908: Jack Kearney
- 1909: Not held
- 1910: Bill O'Reilly
- 1911: Not held
- 1912: Dan McGrath
- 1913: Not held
- 1914: Jack McHolm (NZL)
- 1915: Not held
- 1916: Not held
- 1917: Not held
- 1918: Not held
- 1919: Not held
- 1920: Jack McHolm (NZL)
- 1921: Not held
- 1922: Leslie Rouse
- 1923: Not held
- 1924: Jack McHolm (NZL)
- 1925: Not held
- 1926: William Harvey (NZL)
- 1927: Not held
- 1928: William Harvey (NZL)
- 1929: Not held

- 1930: Not held
- 1931: Not held
- 1932: Not held
- 1933: Not held
- 1934: Myer Rosenblum
- 1935: Not held
- 1936: Myer Rosenblum
- 1937: Not held
- 1938: Keith Pardon
- 1939: Not held
- 1940: Not held
- 1941: Not held
- 1942: Not held
- 1943: Not held
- 1944: Not held
- 1945: Not held
- 1946: Not held
- 1947: Keith Allen
- 1948: Keith Allen
- 1949: Keith Allen
- 1950: Keith Pardon
- 1951: Keith Pardon
- 1952: Keith Pardon
- 1953: Keith Pardon
- 1954: Tom Mullins
- 1955: Keith Pardon
- 1956: Herb Barker
- 1957: Charlie Morris
- 1958: Charlie Morris
- 1959: Dick Leffler
- 1960: Dick Leffler
- 1961: Dick Leffler
- 1962: Dick Leffler
- 1963: Dick Leffler
- 1964: Dick Leffler
- 1965: Dick Leffler
- 1966: Dick Leffler
- 1967: Dick Leffler
- 1968: Walter Grob
- 1969: Dick Leffler

- 1970: Dick Leffler
- 1971: Ron Frawley
- 1972: Ron Frawley
- 1973: Dick Leffler
- 1974: Gus Puopolo
- 1975: Gus Puopolo
- 1976: Gus Puopolo
- 1977: Gus Puopolo
- 1978: Gus Puopolo
- 1979: Gus Puopolo
- 1980: Loris Bertolacci
- 1981: Hans Lotz
- 1982: Hans Lotz
- 1983: Hans Lotz
- 1984: Hans Lotz
- 1985: Hans Lotz
- 1986: Joe Quigley
- 1987: Sean Carlin
- 1988: Sean Carlin
- 1989: Joe Quigley
- 1990: Sean Carlin
- 1991: Yuriy Sedykh (URS)
- 1992: Sean Carlin
- 1993: Sean Carlin
- 1994: Sean Carlin
- 1995: Sean Carlin
- 1996: Sean Carlin
- 1997: Stuart Rendell
- 1998: Stuart Rendell
- 1999: Stuart Rendell
- 2000: Stuart Rendell
- 2001: Stuart Rendell
- 2002: Stuart Rendell
- 2003: Stuart Rendell
- 2004: Stuart Rendell
- 2005: Stuart Rendell
- 2006: Stuart Rendell
- 2007: Hiroaki Doi (JPN)
- 2008: Hiroaki Doi (JPN)
- 2009: Mark Dickson

- 2010: Hiroaki Doi (JPN)
- 2011: Timothy Driesen
- 2012: Timothy Driesen
- 2014: Timothy Driesen
- 2015: Matthew Denny
- 2016: Matthew Denny
- 2017: Matthew Denny
- 2018: Matthew Denny

== Javelin ==
- 1920: Not held
- 1921: Not held
- 1922: Alfred Reid
- 1923: Not held
- 1924: Denis Duigan
- 1925: Not held
- 1926: Stan Lay (NZL)
- 1927: Not held
- 1928: Stan Lay (NZL)
- 1929: Not held
- 1930: George Bronder
- 1931: Not held
- 1932: George Bronder
- 1933: Not held
- 1934: Bert Sheiles
- 1935: Not held
- 1936: Bert Sheiles
- 1937: Not held
- 1938: Jack Metcalfe
- 1939: Not held
- 1940: Not held
- 1941: Not held
- 1942: Not held
- 1943: Not held
- 1944: Not held
- 1945: Not held
- 1946: Not held
- 1947: Bert Sheiles
- 1948: Trevor Evans
- 1949: Trevor Evans
- 1950: Les McKeand
- 1951: Alex Hakelis
- 1952: Alex Hakelis
- 1953: James Achurch
- 1954: James Achurch
- 1955: Bob Grant
- 1956: Bob Grant
- 1957: Bob Grant
- 1958: Nick Birks
- 1959: Nick Birks

- 1960: Nick Birks
- 1961: Nick Birks
- 1962: Alf Mitchell
- 1963: Nick Birks
- 1964: Nick Birks
- 1965: Nick Birks
- 1966: Nick Birks
- 1967: Reg Spiers
- 1968: Ronald Carlton
- 1969: Sig Koscik
- 1970: Sig Koscik
- 1971: Peter Lawler
- 1972: Sig Koscik
- 1973: Sig Koscik
- 1974: Nick Birks
- 1975: Sig Koscik
- 1976: Manfred Rohkamper
- 1977: Reg Spiers
- 1978: Manfred Rohkamper
- 1979: Garry Calvert
- 1980: Manfred Rohkämper
- 1981: Mike O'Rourke (NZL)
- 1982: Garry Calvert
- 1983: Dave Dixon
- 1984: Dave Dixon
- 1985: John Stapylton-Smith (NZL)
- 1986: Murray Keen
- 1987: Gavin Lovegrove (NZL)
- 1988: Ben Hodgson
- 1989: Gavin Lovegrove (NZL)
- 1990: Jean-Paul Lakafia (FRA)
- 1991: Yki Laine (FIN)
- 1992: Cameron Graham
- 1993: Andrew Currey
- 1994: Andrew Currey
- 1995: Andrew Currey
- 1996: Andrew Currey
- 1997: Adrian Hatcher
- 1998: Andrew Currey
- 1999: Andrew Currey

- 2000: Andrew Currey
- 2001: William Hamlyn-Harris
- 2002: Andrew Currey
- 2003: Andrew Currey
- 2004: William Hamlyn-Harris
- 2005: Oliver Dziubak
- 2006: Stuart Farquhar (NZL)
- 2007: Jarrod Bannister
- 2008: Jarrod Bannister
- 2009: Stuart Farquhar (NZL)
- 2010: Jarrod Bannister
- 2011: Jarrod Bannister
- 2012: Joshua Robinson
- 2013: Jarrod Bannister
- 2014: Joshua Robinson
- 2015: Matthew Outzen
- 2016: Stuart Farquhar (NZL)
- 2017: Hamish Peacock
- 2018: Hamish Peacock

== Decathlon ==
- 1920: Not held
- 1921: Not held
- 1922: Not held
- 1923: Not held
- 1924: Denis Duigan
- 1925: Not held
- 1926: Max Kroger
- 1927: Not held
- 1928: Eino Keskinen
- 1929: Not held
- 1930: Not held
- 1931: Not held
- 1932: Not held
- 1933: Not held
- 1934: Not held
- 1935: Not held
- 1936: Not held
- 1937: Not held
- 1938: Not held
- 1939: Not held
- 1940: Not held
- 1941: Not held
- 1942: Not held
- 1943: Not held
- 1944: Not held
- 1945: Not held
- 1946: Not held
- 1947: Not held
- 1948: Not held
- 1949: Not held
- 1950: Not held
- 1951: Not held
- 1952: Not held
- 1953: Not held
- 1954: Not held
- 1955: Not held
- 1956: Not held
- 1957: Not held
- 1958: Not held
- 1959: Not held

- 1960: Pat Leane
- 1961: Nick Birks
- 1962: Nick Birks
- 1963: Roy Williams (NZL*)
- 1964: Nick Birks
- 1965: John O'Neill
- 1966: Wayne Athorne
- 1967: John Hamann
- 1968: Geoff Smith
- 1969: Geoff Smith
- 1970: Geoff Smith
- 1971: Terry Beaton
- 1972: Sam Caruthers (USA), Robbie Goff (1st Aust.)
- 1973: Robbie Goff
- 1974: Sanitesi Latu (TGA), Terry Beaton (1st Aust.)
- 1975: Rob Lethbridge
- 1976: Peter Hadfield
- 1977: Peter Hadfield
- 1978: Sanitesi Latu
- 1979: Peter Hadfield
- 1980: Peter Hadfield
- 1981: Peter Hadfield
- 1982: Peter Hadfield
- 1983: Peter Hadfield
- 1984: Peter Hadfield
- 1985: Peter Hadfield
- 1986: Simon Shirley
- 1987: Stuart Andrews
- 1988: Simon Shirley
- 1989: Chris Bradshaw
- 1990: Paul Scott
- 1991: Paul Scott
- 1992: Dean Smith
- 1993: Peter Winter
- 1994: Dean Smith
- 1995: Leslie Kuorikoski
- 1996: Peter Winter
- 1997: Peter Banks
- 1998: Jagan Hames
- 1999: Scott Ferrier

- 2000: Klaus Ambrosch (AUT), Jagan Hames (1st Aust.)
- 2001: Matthew McEwen
- 2002: Scott Ferrier
- 2003: Matthew McEwen
- 2004: Matthew McEwen
- 2005: Eric Surjan
- 2006: Jason Dudley
- 2007: Eric Surjan
- 2008: Jason Dudley
- 2009: Brent Newdick (NZL), Stephen Cain (1st Aust.)
- 2010: Stephen Cain
- 2011: Jarrod Sims
- 2012: Brent Newdick (NZL), Jarrod Sims (1st Aust.)
- 2013: Scott McLaren (NZL), Kyle McCarthy (1st Aust.)
- 2014: Jake Stein
- 2015: David Brock
- 2016: Cedric Dubler
- 2017: Cedric Dubler
- 2018: Cedric Dubler
- 2019: Daniel Golubovic (USA), Kyle Cranston (1st Aust.)
- 2020: Cedric Dubler
- 2021: Ashley Moloney
- 2022: Cedric Dubler

== See also ==
- Athletics Australia
- List of Australian athletics champions (women)
- Australian Championships in Athletics
