= Neville Sillitoe =

Australian athletics coach (1925–2021)

Neville John Sillitoe OAM (24 April 1925 – 20 June 2021) was an Australian athletics coach.

Sillitoe competed for the Coburg Athletic Club. Upon his retirement, he took up athletics coaching and helped lay the foundations for one of the most successful eras of Australian sprinting with the East Melbourne Harriers Athletic Club. Australian representatives that Sillitoe coached include Peter Norman, Gary Holdsworth, Greg Lewis, Aaron Rouge-Serret, Colin McQueen, Denise Boyd, Richard James, Bruce Frayne, Tamsyn Lewis and Ken Hall. He was the coach of the 1982 Commonwealth Games Team and held a long serving athletics coaching post with Caulfield Grammar School in Melbourne from 1983 to 2014.

Sillitoe was awarded a Medal of the Order of Australia in 2018 for services to athletics.

Sillitoe died on 20 June 2021. He is buried at the Fawkner Cemetery.

== See also ==
- Australian athletics champions
- List of Caulfield Grammar School people
