= Athletics at the 1950 British Empire Games – Men's 440 yards hurdles =

Men's 440 yards hurdles at the Commonwealth Games

The men's 440 yards hurdles event at the 1950 British Empire Games was held on 5 and 7 February at the Eden Park in Auckland, New Zealand.

== Medalists ==
Gold	Silver	Bronze
Duncan White; Ceylon	John Holland; New Zealand	Geoff Goodacre; Australia

== Results ==
=== Heats ===
Held on 5 February

Qualification: First 3 in each heat (Q) qualify directly for the semifinals.

Rank	Heat	Name	Nationality	Time	Notes
1	1	Duncan White	Ceylon	52.8	Q, GR
2	1	Geoff Goodacre	Australia	54.3	Q
3	1	Robert Woodward	Australia	54.3	Q
4	1	Alan Hill	New Zealand	??.?	
5	1	John Hart	Scotland	??.?	
1	2	John Holland	New Zealand	53.0	Q
2	2	Ken Doubleday	Australia	55.4	Q
3	2	George Lubbe	South Africa	??.?	Q
4	2	Terence Higgins	England	?	
	2	Vivian Blaze	Ceylon	DNS	
1	3	Derek Steward	New Zealand	54.4	Q
2	3	Harold Whittle	England	??.?	Q
3	3	George Gedge	Australia	56.4	Q
4	3	Bill LaRochelle	Canada	??.?	
5	3	Ng Liang Chiang	Malaya	??.?	

=== Semifinals ===
Held on 7 February

Qualification: First 3 in each heat (Q) qualify directly for the final.

Rank	Heat	Name	Nationality	Time	Notes
1	1	Geoff Goodacre	Australia	53.2	Q
2	1	George Lubbe	South Africa	53.4	Q
3	1	Duncan White	Ceylon	53.4	Q
4	1	Derek Steward	New Zealand	??.?	
4	1	Ken Doubleday	Australia	??.?	
1	2	John Holland	New Zealand	53.4	Q
2	2	George Gedge	Australia	53.9	Q
3	2	Harold Whittle	England	53.9	Q
4	2	Robert Woodward	Australia	??.?	

=== Final ===
Held on 7 February

Rank	Lane	Name	Nationality	Time	Notes
1st place, gold medalist(s)	2	Duncan White	Ceylon	52.5	GR
2nd place, silver medalist(s)	5	John Holland	New Zealand	52.7	
3rd place, bronze medalist(s)	1	Geoff Goodacre	Australia	53.1	
4	6	George Lubbe	South Africa	??.?	
5	4	Harold Whittle	England	??.?	
6	3	George Gedge	Australia	??.?	Fell
