= Gordon Windeyer =

Australian high jumper

Medal record

Men's athletics

Representing Australia

British Commonwealth Games
Gold medal – first place	1974 Christchurch	High jump

Gordon Phillip Windeyer (born 20 February 1954) is an Australian former track and field athlete who competed in the high jump. He was the gold medallist in the event at the 1974 British Commonwealth Games, setting a games record mark. A three-time winner at the Australian Athletics Championships in the 1970s, he is a former Australian record holder with a best of 2.21 m (7 ft 3 in).

== Career ==
Windeyer was born in New South Wales. Using the Fosbury Flop method of high jumping, Windeyer rose to national level as a young athlete and was a repeat winner of the Australian junior title from 1971 to 1972. He jumped over two metres to win in 1972.

Lawrie Peckham was the top Australian jumper of the period and Windeyer finished as runner-up behind him at the senior Australian Athletics Championships in 1974, clearing a new best of 2.13 m (6 ft 11 3/4 in) and losing only on countback. Both were selected to represent Australia at the 1974 British Commonwealth Games held in Christchurch. Windeyer caused an upset by beating Peckham – the two-time defending champion – and clearing a new games record height of 2.16 m (7 ft 1 in).

In the 1975 season Windeyer and Peckham were again tied at the national championships, with Peckham winning on countback. Windeyer ended that winning streak (stretching back to 1969) with a win at the 1976 Australian Championships, and managed a meeting record of 2.18 m (7 ft 1 3/4 in) to establish himself among the nation's best. A 1977 win in 2.05 m (6 ft 8 1/2 in) was more modest but he was Australian champion for a third consecutive in 1978 with a championship record of 2.20 m (7 ft 2 1/2 in). That mark went unbeaten until 1984, when it was improved by John Atkinson.

Windeyer aimed to defend his high jump title at the 1978 Commonwealth Games and proved to be in good form that year after a national title win and a new personal best and Australian record-equalling clearance of 2.21 m (7 ft 3 in) immediately before the competition. At the event in Edmonton, Alberta, Canada, Windeyer was one centimetre short of his previous games record, but this was not sufficient to reach the podium – Canadians, led by Claude Ferragne, took the top three positions and Windeyer missed out on a bronze medal on countback alone.

Windeyer subsequently retired from competitive athletics, but remained involved in the sport and later became a board member for the regional Athletics New South Wales organisation.

== National titles ==
- Australian Athletics Championships
  - High jump: 1976, 1977, 1978

== International competitions ==
Year	Competition	Venue	Position	Notes
1974	British Commonwealth Games	Christchurch, New Zealand	1st	2.16 GR
1978	Commonwealth Games	Edmonton, Canada	5th	2.15
