= Athletics at the 1962 British Empire and Commonwealth Games – Men's javelin throw =

Men's javelin throw at the 1962 British Empire and Commonwealth Games
- Venue: Perry Lakes Stadium
- Date: 24 November 1962
- Competitors: 12 from 6 nations
- Winning distance: 256 ft 3 in (78.11 m) GR

Medalists
gold medal	Alf Mitchell	Australia
silver medal	Colin Smith	England
bronze medal	Nick Birks	Australia

The men's javelin throw at the 1962 British Empire and Commonwealth Games as part of the athletics programme was held at the Perry Lakes Stadium in Western Australia on Saturday 24 November 1962.

The winning margin was 17 cm which as of 2024 remains the only time the men's javelin throw was won by less than 20 cm at these games.

The event was won by Australian Alf Mitchell with a throw of 256 ft 3 in (78.11 m), breaking his personal best by over a foot. Mitchell won by 6 1/2 in (17 cm) ahead of the defending champion, Englishmen Colin Smith and fellow countryman Nick Birks who won the bronze medal. Mitchell throw also set a new Games record, eclipsing the mark that Smith had set in Cardiff four years earlier. The previous distance of 233 ft 10 1/2 in (71.29 m) was also bettered by Smith, Birks and Pakistan's Mohamad Nawaz who finished in fourth position.

== Records ==
World record	Carlo Lievore (ITA)	284 ft 7 in (86.74 m)	Milan, Italy	1 June 1961
Commonwealth record				
Games record	Colin Smith (ENG)	233 ft 10 1/2 in (71.29 m)	Cardiff, Wales	20 July 1958

== Final ==
Rank	Name	Nationality	Result	Notes
1st place, gold medalist(s)	Alf Mitchell	Australia	256 ft 3 in (78.11 m)	GR
2nd place, silver medalist(s)	Colin Smith	England	255 ft 8 1/2 in (77.94 m)	
3rd place, bronze medalist(s)	Nick Birks	Australia	246 ft 3 1/2 in (75.07 m)	
4	Mohamad Nawaz	Pakistan	241 ft 8 in (73.66 m)	
5	Reg Spiers	Australia	228 ft 8 in (69.70 m)	
6	William Liga	Fiji	211 ft 5 in (64.44 m)	
7	Dick Miller	Northern Ireland	208 ft 5 1/2 in (63.54 m)	
8	Ivaharia Oe	Papua New Guinea	200 ft 6 1/2 in (61.13 m)	
9	John McSorley	England	190 ft 2 1/2 in (57.98 m)	
10	Joseph Hart	Australia	189 ft 8 1/2 in (57.82 m)	
11	George Heriot	Papua New Guinea	175 ft 11 1/2 in (53.63 m)	
	Roy Hollingsworth	England		DNS
