= Jarrod Bannister =

Australian javelin thrower (1984–2018)

Personal information
- Born: 3 October 1984 Townsville, Queensland, Australia
- Died: 7 February 2018 (aged 33) Eindhoven, Netherlands
- Height: 1.9 m (6 ft 3 in)
- Weight: 100 kg (220 lb)

Sport
- Country: Australia
- Sport: Track and field
- Event: Javelin throw

Achievements and titles
- Personal bests: NR 89.02 m (2008)
Medal record
Men's athletics
Representing Australia
Commonwealth Games
Gold medal – first place	2010 Delhi	Javelin
- Updated on 16 April 2013

Jarrod Bannister (3 October 1984 – 8 February 2018) was an Australian track and field athlete who competed in the javelin throw. His personal best throw of 89.02 metres, achieved in 2008, is the Australian and Oceanian record.

== Career ==
Bannister was born in Townsville, Queensland on 3 October 1984. He won the youth javelin title at the Australian Athletics Championships in 2001. He later won five senior javelin national titles: in 2006, 2007, 2009, 2010, and 2012. He competed twice at the World Championships in Athletics, placing eleventh in qualifying in 2007 and finishing seventh in the final in 2011. He represented his country at the Olympic Games in 2008 and 2012, finishing sixth at the former and placing twenty-seventh in the qualifying stage of the latter. He won gold at the 2010 Commonwealth Games – the first and only international senior medal of his career. This made him the first Australian winner in that event for nearly fifty years, following in the footsteps of 1962 champion Alf Mitchell.

In June 2013, he controversially received a 20-month doping ban after missing three tests in the previous 18 months, which is equivalent to a failed test. Originally facing two years, he took the case to the Court of Arbitration for Sport, where it was agreed that he was at the hotel he had listed, but due to confusion between the hotel and Athletics Australia, they believed that he had already checked out, leading to a missed third test. Despite this, his ban was only reduced to 20 months.

He returned to competition in 2015. He also competed in 2016 but did not participate in the 2017 season.

== Death ==
On 8 February 2018, Bannister was found dead in his home in Eindhoven, Netherlands, where he was living with his girlfriend while training. Fairfax Media reported there were no suspicious circumstances surrounding his death. Athletics commentator and ex-Olympian David Culbert said Bannister was "a super athlete who sadly had many demons".

== International competitions ==
Representing Australia
Year	Competition	Venue	Position	Event	Notes
2000	Oceania Youth Championships	Adelaide, Australia	1st	Javelin	66.15 m
2002	World Junior Championships	Kingston, Jamaica	4th	Javelin	73.31 m
2006	Commonwealth Games	Melbourne, Australia	6th	Javelin	78.06 m
2007	World Championships	Osaka, Japan	11th (q)	Javelin	77.57 m
2008	Olympic Games	Beijing, PR China	6th	Javelin	83.45 m
2010	Commonwealth Games	Delhi, India	1st	Javelin	81.71m
2010	Continental Cup	Split, Croatia	4th	Javelin	79.99 m
2011	World Championships	Daegu, South Korea	7th	Javelin	82.25 m
2012	Olympic Games	London, United Kingdom	27th (q)	Javelin	77.38 m

== Seasonal bests ==
- 2002 – 73.31
- 2006 – 78.06
- 2007 – 83.70
- 2008 – 89.02
- 2010 – 83.17
- 2011 – 82.25
- 2012 – 83.70
- 2013 – 79.99
- 2015 – 76.09
- 2016 – 78.29

== See also ==
- List of Commonwealth Games medallists in athletics (men)
- List of javelin throw national champions (men)
- List of Australian athletics champions (men)
- List of doping cases in athletics
