= Ray Boyd =

Australian pole vaulter (born 1951)

Personal information
- Nationality: Australian
- Born: 28 June 1951 (age 75)
- Height: 181 cm (5 ft 11 in)
- Weight: 70 kg (154 lb)

Sport
- Sport: Athletics
- Event: Pole vault
- Club: Collingwood Harriers
Medal record
Men's athletics
Representing Australia
Commonwealth Games
| Gold medal – first place | 1982 Brisbane | Pole Vault |

Raymond Boyd (born 28 June 1951) is a former athlete from Australia, who competed in the Pole vault at the 1972 Summer Olympics and the 1976 Summer Olympics.

== Biography ==
Boyd won twelve Australian Championships in the pole vault, ending his career on a high note when winning the gold medal at the 1982 Commonwealth Games in Brisbane. He competed in two Olympics and three Commonwealth Games from 1970 to 1982. He was coached by Wal Chisholm.

Boyd's best vault of 5.30 metres was achieved in Melbourne on 15 March 1976. Boyd also won the British AAA Championships title at the 1975 AAA Championships.

His wife, Denise Boyd (née Robertson) was also a Commonwealth Games champion and double-Olympic finalist at 200 metres. The Boyds have three children, all of whom are successful athletes:

- Alana (born 10 May 1984) - 4.81 m Pole Vaulter
- Jacinta (born 10 February 1986) - 6.64 m Long Jumper
- Matthew (Matt) (born 29 April 1988) - 5.35 m Pole Vaulter

Ray is Alana, Jacinta and Matthew 's coach for training.

== See also ==
- Australian athletics champions
