= Robert Pope (runner) =

British distance runner and philanthropist

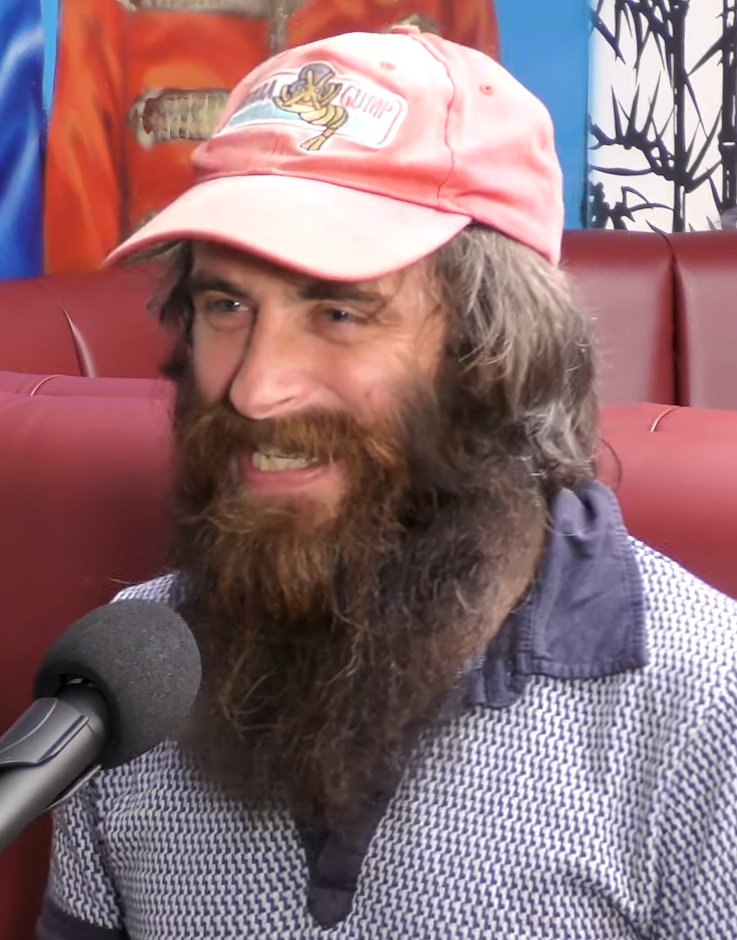

Personal information
- Full name: Robert Pope
- Nationality: British
- Born: October 29, 1978 (age 47) Liverpool, England
- Education: University of Liverpool
- Occupation(s): Veterinian, athlete
- Years active: 2016–present

Sport
- Sport: Long-distance running
- Event(s): Marathon, Ultramarathon
- Retired: no

Robert Pope (born 1978) is a British veterinarian, athlete, author and charity fundraiser. He is an elite distance runner, with a number of successes at the marathon and ultramarathon distances. In 2016 he began a 422-day, 15,700-mile run comprising more than 4 complete crossings of the United States, and became the first person to trace the route run by Tom Hanks' fictional character in the film Forrest Gump. He has raised approaching £100,000 for the charities Peace Direct and the World Wildlife Fund.

== Early life and education ==
Pope was born and grew up in Croxteth, Liverpool. He attended St. Edward's College, Liverpool. From 1996 to 2010, he attended the Royal Veterinary College, London, gaining a BVetMed(Hons.), a BScVetPath(Hons.) and finally a PhD in Veterinary Medicine. He has since worked as an emergency veterinarian.

== Competitive running career ==
At age 37, Pope became the Australian Marathon Champion at the 2015 Australian Athletics Championships with a time of 2:29:59. He subsequently won the Liverpool Rock'n'Roll Marathon in both 2015 and 2016, the latter with a personal best time of 2:27:13. Pope holds the Guinness World Record for the fastest marathon dressed as a film character, set for running the 2018 London Marathon in a time of 2:36:28 (finishing 82 overall) while dressed as Forrest Gump.

In 2019, Pope competed in the 6-day Marathon des Sables ultramarathon, covering 156 miles (250 km) across the Sahara Desert while carrying all food. He finished 14th overall.

== "Forrest Gump" run and charity fundraising ==
In 2016, Pope quit his job as an emergency veterinarian and began his Forrest Gump run which would see him run across the United States of America more than four complete times, in a bid to recreate the 15,300-mile route run by Tom Hanks' fictional character. On May 11, 2018, after 422 days of running, he became the first person to complete this route, as well as the first person to cross the US four times on foot. Pope is estimated to have run 15,607 miles (approximately 600 marathons), made more than 24 million total steps and averaged 37 miles a day. Included in these totals are the New York, Boston, Manchester, Brighton and London marathons, completed during various breaks within the 422-day period. His first act on completion of his run was to propose to his girlfriend, Nadine Strawbridge, who was waiting with their newborn daughter, Bee.

Pope sought sponsorship for the Forrest Gump run, raising nearly £38,000 for the charities Peace Direct and the World Wildlife Fund. In recognition of his charitable efforts, Pope attended Prince Charles' 70th birthday celebrations.

Pope's self-penned book recounting of his American run, "Becoming Forrest: One Man's Epic Run Across America", was published by Harper Collins in 2021.
