= David Fitzsimons =

Australian middle- and long-distance runner (1950–2008)

Personal information
- Full name: David Thomas Fitzsimons
- Nationality: Australian
- Born: 23 April 1950 Victor Harbor, South Australia
- Died: 7 September 2008 (aged 58) North Adelaide, South Australia
- Education: University of Adelaide
- Occupation: Civil engineer
- Employer: Department of Transport, Energy and Infrastructure
- Spouse: Marjorie Dee (m. 1977)

Sport
- Sport: athletics
- Event: running
- University team: Adelaide University Athletics Club
- Retired: 1980

Achievements and titles
- Olympic finals: 1976 Montreal 10,000 m 14th; 1980 Moscow 5000 m 10th in first semifinal
- World finals: 1977 Dusseldorf World Cup 5000 m – Bronze
- Regional finals: 1977 Pacific Conference Games 5000 m – gold
- Commonwealth finals: Competed at 1974 Christchurch and 1978 Edmonton
Medal record
Men's Athletics
Representing Australia
IAAF World Cup
Bronze medal – third place	1977 Düsseldorf	5000 metres

David Fitzsimons (23 April 1950 – 7 September 2008) was a former Australian Olympic athlete who competed in middle distance events and civil engineer.

A member of the Adelaide University Athletics Club, he represented Australia at two Olympic Games and two Commonwealth Games during his career. Inducted into the South Australian Athletics Hall of Fame in 2000. Fitzsimons won eight Australian Championships in Athletics over 5000 metres and 10000 metres including the 5k/10k double on three occasions.

== Engineering ==
Fitzsimons worked for 30 years at the Transport Department of the South Australian Government. He was the supervising engineer of a road bridge which replaced a level crossing on Park Terrace on what became the city ring route of Adelaide. The Park Terrace bridge over the Gawler railway line and interstate freight line is 120 metres long and was constructed in 1990. It was named after Fitzsimons in 2017.

== Athletics career record ==
During his athletics career, Fitzsimons represented Australia at two Olympic Games, two Commonwealth Games and two World Cups.

Fitzsimons's greatest international achievement was placing third over 5000 metres at the inaugural IAAF World Cup in 1977.

== Statistics ==
Personal Bests

Event	Performance	Place	Date
1500m	3-39.92	Christchurch, New Zealand	31 January 1974
2000m	5-06.6	Edmonton, Canada	2 August 1978
3000m	7-48.74	Gothenburg, Sweden	16 July 1978
2 miles	8-28.0	Melbourne, Australia	11 January 1979
5000m	13–17.42	Düsseldorf, Germany	4 September 1977
10000m	28–04.64	London, Great Britain	9 September 1977

== See also ==
- Australian athletics champions
