= Colin Smith (athlete) =

British javelin thrower (1935–2014)

Personal information
- Nationality: British (English)
- Born: 2 August 1935 Harlesden, London
- Died: 21 December 2014 (aged 79)

Sport
- Sport: Athletics
- Event: javelin throw
- Club: Thames Valley Harriers
Medal record
Men's Athletics
Representing England
British Empire and Commonwealth Games
Gold medal – first place	1958 Cardiff	Javelin throw
Silver medal – second place	1962 Perth	Javelin throw

Colin George Smith (2 August 1935 – 21 December 2014) was a British former track and field athlete who specialised in the javelin throw. He was the gold medallist for the England athletics team in the event at the 1958 British Empire and Commonwealth Games, setting a games record mark of 71.29 m (233 ft 10 1/2 in) to win the title. He returned to defend his title in 1962 and was much improved with a lifetime best throw of 77.94 m (255 ft 8 1/2 in), but he was beaten into the silver medal position by Australia's Alf Mitchell.

== Biography ==
Born in Harlesden, London, he took up throwing events while a young teenager at school. Trained by Bill Plumridge he went on to compete in over forty internationals for England and Great Britain. Smith competed twice at the European Athletics Championships, taking part in 1958 and again 1962, but did not perform well and failed to make the final round in either attempt.

He was a three-time winner at the AAA Championships, winning in 1958, 1959 and 1963. Prior to that he won the AAA Junior title in 1953. He was a member of Thames Valley Harriers during his career.

Smith served as a coach even in his younger years and assembled a training group comprising the majority of Britain's best throwers, including Dave Travis and John FitzSimons (both Commonwealth champions in their own right), John McSorley (a British record breaker), and John Kitching

In 1972, Smith and his family emigrated to Australia. After retirement in the New South Wales country, Smith, along with his wife and daughter, remained involved in athletics and coached regional level athletes around Sydney. Colin Smith died 21 December 2014.

== International competitions ==
Year	Competition	Venue	Position	Notes
1958	British Empire and Commonwealth Games	Cardiff, United Kingdom	1st	71.29 m GR
1958	European Championships	Stockholm, Sweden	18th	65.35 m
1962	British Empire and Commonwealth Games	Perth, Western Australia	2nd	77.94 m
1962	European Championships	Belgrade, Yugoslavia	25th	63.85 m

== National titles ==
- AAA Championships
  - Javelin throw: 1958, 1959, 1963
