= Simon Shirley =

Australian decathlete

Personal information
- Nationality: English/Australian
- Born: 3 August 1966 (age 59) Nottingham, Nottinghamshire

Sport
- Sport: Athletics
Medal record
Athletics
Representing England
Commonwealth Games
Bronze medal – third place	1994 Victoria	decathlon

Simon Shirley (born 3 August 1966 in Nottingham, United Kingdom) is a retired decathlete who competed for Australia at the 1986 Commonwealth Games in Edinburgh, Scotland, and at the 1988 Summer Olympics in Seoul, South Korea, and for England at the 1994 Commonwealth Games in Victoria, Canada.

== Junior career ==
Shirley was born in Nottingham but began school in New Zealand. He then moved to Brisbane where he attended Mount Gravatt State High School. In December 1983, he won the Boys Under 19 Multiple Event at the Australian All Schools Track and Field Championships in Adelaide with a total of 6708 points. In 1984, his application to attend the Australian Institute of Sport was rejected. The following day in Brisbane, he again won the Boys Under 19 Multiple Event at the Australian All Schools Track and Field Championships, this time scoring 7504 points.

== Senior career ==
Shirley first competed in the Decathlon at the Australian Track and Field Championships in Brisbane in April 1985. He scored 7321 points and finished fourth, 293 points behind Peter Hadfield. In March 1986 at the now separate Australian Multiple Events Championships in Hobart, Shirley won his first Australian decathlon title with a score of 7438 points.

Shirley was selected to represent Australia at the Commonwealth Games in Edinburgh. He scored 7290 points and finished eighth in the decathlon, 1373 points behind gold medalist Daley Thompson.

In 1987, Shirley attended Washington State University in Pullman, Washington under coach John Chaplin. In February 1988, he returned to Australia to compete in two decathlons. At the first in Brisbane, he set a new personal best score of 7911 points. In March at the Australian Multiple Events Championships in Canberra, he wore his WSU jersey throughout the championships, which enraged some of his fellow countrymen, and regained his national decathlon title with a score of 7814 points.

Shirley's career personal best score of 8036 points was achieved at the 1988 Olympic Games in Seoul, where he finished 15th behind gold medalist Christian Schenk of East Germany.

Shirley continued to compete for Australia throughout 1989 but thereafter stated his intention to return to his birth nation of England and compete for Great Britain. His first significant performance as a British athlete was in June 1993 when he won the decathlon at the Azusa Pacific University track meet with a score of 7944 points.

Shirley represented England at the 1994 Commonwealth Games in Victoria, Canada. His score of 7980 points, his best as a British athlete and second best overall, won him a bronze medal behind winner Mike Smith of Canada. He almost withdrew after seven events, having injured an ankle three weeks earlier, but was persuaded to continue by the England team manager.

Shirley competed in five more competitive decathlons, twice failing to finish but twice scoring over 7800 points. At the 1995 Hypo-Bank combined events track meet in Götzis, Austria, Shirley wore a Superman costume while competing and set a personal best of 14.59m in the shot put.

== Achievements ==
Year	Competition	Venue	Position	Event	Result
1985	Australian Track and Field Championships	Brisbane	4th	Decathlon	7321
1986	Australian Multiple Event Championships	Hobart	1st	Decathlon	7438
1986	Commonwealth Games	Edinburgh, Scotland	8th	Decathlon	7290
1988	Australian Multiple Event Championships	Canberra	1st	Decathlon	7814
1988	Summer Olympics	Seoul, South Korea	15th	Decathlon	8036
1994	Commonwealth Games	Victoria, Canada	3rd	Decathlon	7980

== Notes ==
- Profile
- 1988 Year List
