= Patrick Woods =

Australian long-distance runner

Personal information
- Born: 1967 (age 58–59)

Sport
- Sport: Track and field

Patrick Woods (born 1967) is a former Australian track and field athlete, winner of the 1990 Australian Athletics Championships senior 3000 metres steeplechase title, as well as several Australian junior titles in the 1980s. He also represented Australia in the 2000 metre steeple chase at the 1986 World Junior Championships in Athletics.

== See also ==
- List of Australian athletics champions (men)
