= Athletics at the 1966 British Empire and Commonwealth Games – Men's javelin throw =

Men's javelin throw at the 1966 British Empire and Commonwealth Games
- Venue: Independence Park, Kingston
- Dates: August 6, 1966

Medalists
gold medal	John FitzSimons	England
silver medal	Nick Birks	Australia
bronze medal	Muhammad Nawaz	Pakistan

The men's javelin throw event at the 1966 British Empire and Commonwealth Games was held on 6 August at the Independence Park in Kingston, Jamaica.

== Results ==
Final results
Rank	Name	Nationality	Distance	Notes
1st place, gold medalist(s)	John FitzSimons	England	261 ft 9 in (79.78 m)	
2nd place, silver medalist(s)	Nick Birks	Australia	249 ft 10 in (76.16 m)	
3rd place, bronze medalist(s)	Muhammad Nawaz	Pakistan	229 ft 5 in (69.94 m)	
4	Nashathar Singh	Malaysia	227 ft 6 in (69.35 m)	
5	Ainsley Roost	Canada	218 ft 7 in (66.63 m)	
6	Dave Travis	England	215 ft 4 in (65.64 m)	
7	Zenon Andrusyshyn	Canada	210 ft 7 in (64.19 m)	
8	Cheruon Kiptalam	Kenya	199 ft 1 in (60.69 m)	
9	Noel Simons	Bermuda	164 ft 2 in (50.05 m)	
10	Cecil Usher	British Honduras	156 ft 8 in (47.76 m)	
11	Hartley Saunders	Bahamas	152 ft 8 in (46.54 m)	
12	Ayrton Clouden	Saint Vincent and the Grenadines	147 ft 4 in (44.91 m)	
