= Don Commons =

Australian triple jumper

Personal information
- Nationality: Australian
- Born: 5 May 1952 (age 74)

Sport
- Sport: Athletics
- Event: triple jump

Donald James Commons (born 5 May 1952) is a retired triple jumper from Australia, who represented his country in the 1974 British Commonwealth Games in Christchurch, New Zealand.

He also represented Australia in the 1977 Summer Universiade, the 1977 Pacific Conference Games and the 1977 IAAF World Cup. He won the Australian triple jump championship in 1976 and 1977.

Commons finished third behind fellow Australian Mick McGrath in the triple jump event at the British 1975 AAA Championships.

His brothers, Chris Commons and David Commons, were also notable athletes.
