= Picnic Point High School =

Location
- 61 Kennedy Street; Picnic Point, New South Wales, 2213; Australia; 33.9648°S 151.0095°E

Information
- School type: High school
- Motto: Knowledge is Life
- Established: 1962
- Educational authority: New South Wales Education Standards Authority
- Oversight: New South Wales Department of Education
- Principal: Sharon Byron
- Staff: Approximately 85
- Enrolment: Approximately 1000
- Colours: Green and gold
- Website: picnicpt-h.schools.nsw.gov.au

Picnic Point High School is a government high school located in the suburb of Picnic Point, in Sydney, Australia.

The school has approximately 1000 students in Years 7 to 12. It prepares students for the Higher School Certificate (HSC) in Year 12, and the Record of School Achievement for those students who leave school before attaining the HSC. The school celebrated its 60th anniversary on Saturday, 24 November 2022.

== Notable alumni ==
- Rod Bower – cricketer; represented NSW and Tasmania
- Lachlan Burr – rugby league player; played with the Australia Schoolboy rugby league team
- Matt Dopierala – principal of James Ruse Agricultural High School
- Ashleigh Gardner – cricketer; member of the national women's team
- Jarrad Hickey – rugby league player; played with the Canterbury-Bankstown Bulldogs
- Peter Jones – Australian naval officer; Vice-Admiral
- Cameron Phelps – rugby league player with Canterbury-Bankstown Bulldogs and Wigan Warriors
- Peter Smith – rugby league player with Canterbury-Bankstown, South Sydney and Gold Coast

== Notable staff ==
- Alan Ashton – member of the New South Wales Legislative Assembly (1999–2011)
- Ted Glossop – coach of the Canterbury-Bankstown Bulldogs rugby league team
- John Murray – Speaker of the New South Wales Legislative Assembly
- Geoff Smith – Australian decathlon champion
