= Warwick Selvey =

Australian athlete (1939–2018)

Personal information
- Born: Warwick Perrins Selvey . 3 December 1939
- Died: 16 August 2018 (aged 78) Sakon Nakhon, Thailand
Medal record
Men's Athletics
Representing Australia
Commonwealth Games
Gold medal – first place	1962 Perth	Discus

Warwick Perrins Selvey (3 December 1939 – 16 August 2018) was an Australian Olympic athlete who competed in the shot put and discus events.

Selvey won a total of 18 Australian Championships in Athletics between 1960 and 1973 which is a record for male athletes.

He represented Australia at two Olympic Games, making the final of the shot and discus in the 1960 Rome Games. At his only Commonwealth Games, in 1962, he won the discus and finished fourth in the shot put.

He died in Sakhon Nakhon Hospital in Thailand of Cardiac Arrest, following Hip Replacement Surgery.

== Statistics ==
Personal Bests

Event	Performance	Place	Date
Shot	17.35m	Melbourne, Australia	22 April 1962
Discus	58.90m	Adelaide, Australia	26 February 1967

== See also ==
- Australian athletics champions
