= Noel Freeman =

Australian racewalker

Olympic medal record

Men's Athletics

Representing Australia

Olympic Games
Silver medal – second place	1960 Rome	20 kilometre walk

Commonwealth Games
Gold medal – first place	1970 Edinburgh	20 mile walk

Noel Frederick Freeman (born 24 December 1938) is an Australian former athlete who competed mainly in the 20 kilometre walk.

== Biography ==
Born in Preston, Victoria, Frederick competed for Australia in the 1960 Summer Olympics held in Rome in the 20-kilometer walk, where he won the silver medal. He was disqualified in the longer 50 km event whilst in the leading group.

Four years later, he took fourth in the 20 km event in Tokyo.

In the 1970 Commonwealth Games in Edinburgh, he was the winner of the 20-mile walk, ahead of fellow Australian Bob Gardiner and Scot Bill Sutherland.
