= Frank Clark (race walker) =

Australian racewalker

Frank Allan Clark (born 11 September 1943) is an Australian former racewalker who competed in the 1968 Summer Olympics and the 1966 British Empire and Commonwealth Games.
