= John Chittick (athlete) =

Australian hurdler (1937–2026)

Personal information
- Nationality: Australian
- Born: 29 October 1937 Warrnambool, Victoria, Australia
- Died: 18 July 2026 (aged 88) Port Fairy, Victoria, Australia

Sport
- Sport: Track and field
- Event: 110 metres hurdles

John Chittick (29 October 1937 – 18 July 2026) was an Australian hurdler. He competed in the 110 metres hurdles at the 1956 Summer Olympics and the 1960 Summer Olympics.

Chittick died at Port Fairy in Victoria, on 18 July 2026, at the age of 88.
