= Peter Hadfield (athlete) =

Australian decathlete

Medal record

Men's Athletics

Representing Australia

Commonwealth Games
Silver medal – second place	1978 Edmonton	Decathlon

Peter Robert Hadfield (born 21 January 1955) is an Australian Olympic athlete who competed in the decathlon.

Hadfield won a total of nine Australian Championships in Athletics between 1976 and 1985. He didn't compete in the National Championships in 1978 as he was living in Paris at the time, training there for the Edmonton Commonwealth Games. He was the best decathlete in Australia for ten years from his first nationals win in 1976, when he broke the Australian record, until he retired after the National Championships in 1985. Although he was the National Champion and record holder for the decathlon he was not selected to compete in the Montreal Olympics that year. He competed at the two following Olympic Games in Moscow (1980), (finishing 4th behind Thompson) and Los Angeles (1984) and two Commonwealth Games in Edmonton (1978) and Brisbane (1982), winning the silver medal, behind Daley Thompson in the 1978 Commonwealth Games in Edmonton.

== Statistics ==
Personal Bests

Event	Performance	Place	Date
Decathlon	8019	Adelaide, Australia	March 1984
Long Jump	7.68m	Sydney, Australia	17 December 1977

== See also ==
- Australian athletics champions
