= Les Perry =

Australian long-distance runner

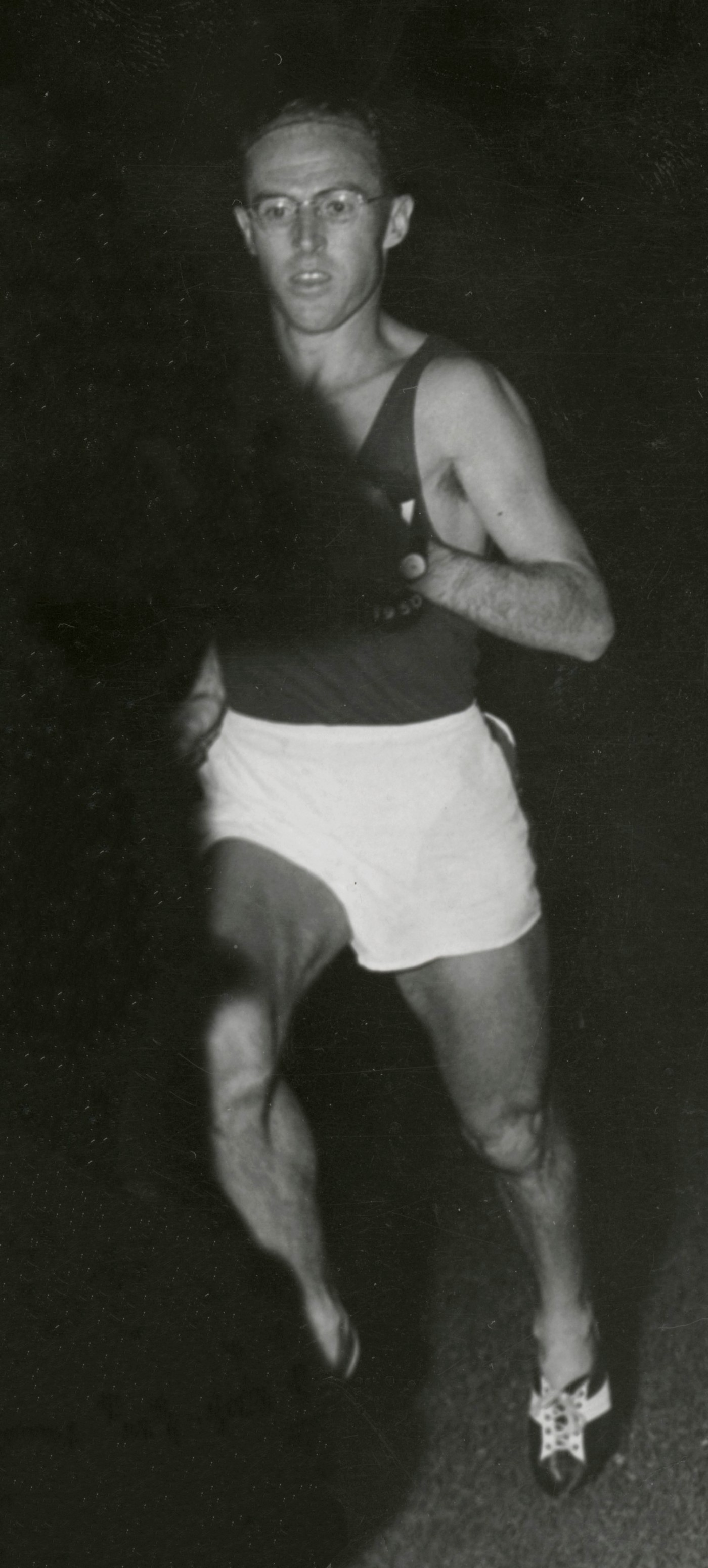
- Perry in 1953

Personal information
- Full name: Leslie John Perry
- Nationality: Australian
- Born: 29 January 1923 Stawell, Victoria, Australia
- Died: 17 September 2005 (aged 82)

Sport
- Sport: Athletics
- Event(s): 5000 m, 10,000 m, marathon
- Club: Williamstown Athletic Club

Achievements and titles
- Personal best(s): 5000 m – 14:23.16 (1952); 10,000 m – 30:23.0 (1953)

Leslie John Perry (29 January 1923 – 17 September 2005) was an Australian long-distance runner.

Perry finished sixth in the 5000 m event at the 1952 Summer Olympics. He also ran the marathon at the 1956 Summer Olympics and 10,000 m in 1952, but did not complete both races. He was the national champion in the 3 miles in 1949–1953, and placed seventh in this event at the 1950 British Empire Games. After the completion of his international career, Perry was instrumental in the establishment and success of the Ringwood Athletics Club.
