= Ray Rigby (weightlifter) =

Australian weightlifter (1949–1998)

Personal information
- Nationality: Australian
- Born: 11 June 1949
- Died: 1 August 1998 (aged 49)

Sport
- Sport: Weightlifting coached by Paul Coffa
Medal record
Weightlifting
CommonwealthGames
Gold medal – first place	1970 Edinburgh	Men's Super Heavyweight

Ray Rigby (11 June 1949 – 1 August 1998) was an Australian shot putter and weightlifter who competed in the 1968 Summer Olympics.
