= Peter Denton (pole vaulter) =

Australian pole vaulter (1926–2000)

Peter Denton (10 June 1926 – 1 December 2000) was an Australian pole vaulter who competed in the 1956 Summer Olympics. He was third in the 1950 British Empire Games pole vault. In the 1954 British Empire and Commonwealth Games pole vault he finished eighth. He attended Sydney Boys High School from 1938 to 1943.
