= John Russell (runner) =

Australian long-distance runner (1932–2025)

Personal information
- Nationality: Australian
- Born: John Frederick Russell; 4 February 1932
- Died: 10 April 2025 (aged 93)

Sport
- Sport: Long-distance running
- Event: Marathon

John Frederick Russell (4 February 1932 – 10 April 2025) was an Australian long-distance runner who competed in the marathon at the 1956 Summer Olympics. He finished eleventh in the 1958 British Empire and Commonwealth Games marathon.

Russell died on 10 April 2025, at the age of 93.
