= Charlie Morris (hammer thrower) =

Australian hammer thrower

Charles "Charlie" James Morris (7 June 1926 – 4 June 2015) was an Australian hammer thrower who competed in the 1956 Summer Olympics as well as the 1958 and the 1962 British Empire and Commonwealth Games.
