= Ves Balodis =

Australian discus thrower (1933–2020)

Vesmonis "Ves" Balodis (24 October 1933 – 29 October 2020) was an Australian discus thrower who competed in the 1956 Summer Olympics. He was born in Auce, Latvia.

Balodis died the 29 October 2020, aged 87.
