= Dion Russell =

Australian racewalker

Personal information
- Born: 8 May 1975 (age 51) Melbourne, Australia

Sport
- Sport: Race walking

Dion Russell (born 8 May 1975) is an Australian former racewalker, born in Melbourne, who competed in the 1996 Summer Olympics and in the 2000 Summer Olympics.
