= Andrew Lloyd (runner) =

Australian long-distance runner

Personal information
- Full name: Andrew Lloyd
- Nationality: Australia
- Born: 14 February 1959 (age 67) Colchester, Essex, England

Sport
- Sport: Running
- Event(s): 5000 m 10,000 m Marathon
Medal record
Commonwealth Games
Gold medal – first place	1990 Auckland	5000m

Andrew Lloyd (born 14 February 1959) is an Australian former runner best known for coming from behind in the last lap to take the 5000m gold medal in the 1990 Auckland Commonwealth Games.

Lloyd was born in Colchester, Essex, England. He represented Australia at the 1988 Summer Olympics and 1985 and 1989 IAAF World Cross Country Championships. He won many prestigious Australian road races in the 1980s and 1990s including the 1983, 1984, 1986 and 1993 City to Surfs, the 1979, 1980 and 1981 Melbourne Marathons (2:26:44, 2:17:37 and 2:19:03 respectively) and the 1980 Gold Coast Marathon (2:23:02).

Lloyd, whose performances in big events had come under question, won a dramatic 5000 metres final at the Commonwealth Games in Auckland's Mount Smart Stadium in 1990. Running third coming into the final bend, Lloyd passed Welshman Ian Hamer and set out after the leader, the reigning Olympic Games 5000 metres champion John Ngugi from Kenya. Ngugi was tiring and with about 5 metres to go Lloyd powered past to win in a time of 13:24.86, just 0.08 in front of the Olympic champion.

He also won in cross country races such as the Chiba International Cross Country in 1988.
