= Bob Wallace (runner) =

Australian long-distance runner (1951–2020)

Bob Wallace (June 21, 1951 – July 21, 2020) was a runner from Croydon, Victoria, Australia. He was best known for running the marathon, with a PR of 2:13:14 in 1981.

== Running career ==
Wallace went to the University of Texas-El Paso where he was a distance runner for the track team under coach Ted Banks, and was the Western Athletic Conference Champion in the 3 mile and steeplechase in 1974. That same year he was an NCAA All-American in the 6 mile. After college, he moved back to Australia. He continued his career, running second in the Australian Olympic marathon trials in 1976, was the Australian national marathon champion in 1977 (2:20:11), and Victorian Marathon Club champion in 1978 (2:21:17). He moved to Omaha, Nebraska in August 1978 with his wife, Gayle, who was to be a student there at the University of Nebraska–Lincoln School of Nursing. In Omaha, he worked as an accountant and computer programmer. In 1980, he won the White Rock Lake Marathon in Dallas (2:15:19) and the Lincoln Marathon (2:20:34). In June 1981 he missed the Boston Marathon due to injury but he finished third in the Grandma's Marathon in Duluth, Minnesota to Dick Beardsley and Garry Bjorklund, where he ran his lifetime personal best of 2:13:14. In April 1982, Wallace came in ninth in the Boston Marathon (2:17:18), a race famously known as the Duel in the Sun. Later that year he moved back to Australia and in July he again won the Australian Marathon Championship (2:16:02) in Brisbane, being the first Australian across the finish line although he finished second to Fumiaki Abe. In October of that year he came in 10th in the Commonwealth Games in Brisbane (2:15:24). For much of his career he was sponsored by Adidas.

== Later career ==
He later moved to Dallas, Texas, where he owned a running store, Run On. He also wrote a book, "Running Your Bucket List Marathon". He also later remarried, to Rebecca.
