= Peter Larkins =

Australian doctor and media personality (born 1954)

- Born: 22 June 1954 (age 72)
- Occupations: Sport and exercise physician
- Employer(s): 3AW, Seven Network

Peter Anthony Larkins (born 22 June 1954 in Geelong, Victoria) is an Australian doctor and media personality as well as a former athlete.

== Early life and athletics career ==
Larkins was educated at St Joseph's College in Geelong, where he was highly regarded and respected as a cheerful and down to earth person. He was very good at sport at school as well as being prominent in the school cadet unit. He later became a prominent track and field athlete who represented Australia in the steeplechase at the 1976 Summer Olympics 1982 Commonwealth Games and the 1981 World Cup. He won the national 3000 m steeplechase championships every year from 1976 to 1983, except for 1982 when he came second.

== Medicine career ==
Among Larkins' education include an honours degree in medical science as well as Bachelor of Medicine and Bachelor of Surgery degrees. He travelled the world studying sports medicine and set up a private practice in the 1980s. He was one of the inaugural Fellows of the Australasian College of Sport and Exercise Physicians

== Media career ==
In 1997, Larkins became the boundary rider for Triple M's Australian Football League coverage, with his prognoses on players' injuries becoming a popular and unique aspect of Triple M's coverage.

Larkins later joined the Nine Network as a boundary rider for AFL games. Later he served providing the latest player injury updates on The Sunday Footy Show.

In 2012, Larkins quit Triple M and joined rival 3AW in an identical role. He also joined the Seven Network to provide injury updates on AFL Game Day and during the network's Saturday night football coverage.

== Publications ==
- Larkins, Dr Peter A. The Healthy Hundred. Melbourne: John Wiley & Sons Australia, 2024. ISBN 978-1-394-21608-6
