= Aaron Rouge-Serret =

Australian sprinter (born 1988)

Personal information
- Born: 28 January 1988 (age 38) Melbourne, Australia
- Height: 1.78 m (5 ft 10 in) (2010)
- Weight: 80 kg (176 lb) (2010)

Sport
- Country: Australia
- Sport: Athletics
- Event: Sprinting

Aaron Rouge-Serret (born January 1988) is an Australian former athlete who competed as a sprinter.

Raised in Melbourne, Rouge-Serret is the son of a Mauritian-born butcher and attended Caulfield Grammar School. In 2005 he was the Australian All Schools Champion in both the 100 and 200 metre sprints.

Rouge-Serret, who had a personal best in the 100 metres of 10.17 seconds, was coached by Neville Sillitoe.

In 2010, Rouge-Serret came fifth in the 100 metres final at the Commonwealth Games in Delhi and was seventh in the 100 metres at the IAAF Continental Cup in Split, Croatia.

Rouge-Serret represented Australia in three editions of the World Athletics Championships.
