= Ted Allsopp =

Australian racewalker (1926–2024)

Edward James Allsopp (15 August 1926 – 18 January 2024) was an Australian racewalker. One of the country's leading male race walkers in the 1950s, he set his personal best (4:20.00) in the men's 50 km in 1966. He was born in Edenhope, Victoria on 15 August 1926, and died in Williamstown, Victoria on 18 January 2024, at the age of 97.

== Achievements ==
Year	Tournament	Venue	Result	Event
1956	Olympic Games	Melbourne, Australia	10th	20 km
1956	Olympic Games	Melbourne, Australia	DSQ	50 km
1964	Olympic Games	Tokyo, Japan	17th	50 km

== Sources ==
- Ted Allsopp's profile at Sports Reference.com
- Profile
