= Lawrie Peckham =

Australian high jumper

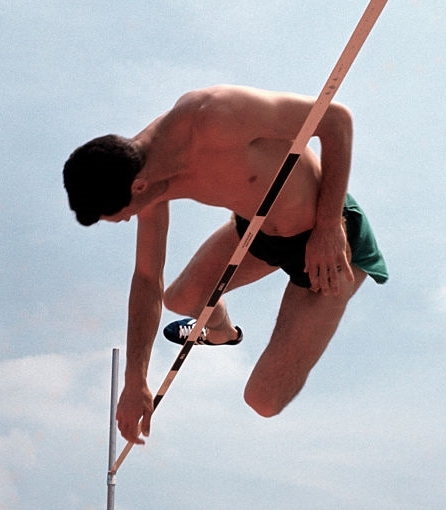
- Lawrie Peckham at the 1968 Olympics

Personal information
- Born: 4 December 1944 (age 81) Melbourne, Australia
- Height: 190 cm (6 ft 3 in)
- Weight: 84 kg (185 lb)

Sport
- Sport: Athletics
- Event: High jump
- Club: Glenhuntly Athletics Club

Achievements and titles
- Personal best: 2.19 m (1965)
Medal record
Representing Australia
Commonwealth Games
Gold medal – first place	1966 Kingston	High jump
Gold medal – first place	1970 Edinburgh	High jump
Silver medal – second place	1974 Christchurch	High jump

Lawrence William "Lawrie" Peckham (born 4 December 1944) is a retired Australian high jumper. A ten-time national champion, he won two gold and one silver medal at the Commonwealth Games in 1966–1974. He competed at the 1968, 1972 and 1976 Olympics and placed 10th, 8th and 18th, respectively. In 1977, Peckham married fellow Olympian, Judy Canty, the 1978 Commonwealth Games champion in the 800 metres. In retirement he worked as a physical education coach.

== International competitions ==
Year	Competition	Venue	Position	Event
1962	British Empire and Commonwealth Games	Perth, Western Australia	6th	High jump
1964	Olympic Games	Tokyo, Japan	10th	High jump
1966	British Empire and Commonwealth Games	Kingston, Jamaica	1st	High jump
1968	Olympic Games	Mexico City, Mexico	8th	High jump
1969	Pacific Conference Games	Tokyo, Japan	1st	High jump
1970	Commonwealth Games	Edinburgh, Scotland	1st	High jump
1972	Olympic Games	Munich, West Germany	18th	High jump
1973	Pacific Conference Games	Toronto, Canada	3rd	High jump
1974	British Commonwealth Games	Christchurch, New Zealand	2nd	High jump

== See also ==
- Australian athletics champions
