= Peter Hanlin =

Australian shot putter

Robert Peter Hanlin (6 October 1931 – 21 August 2000) was an Australian field athlete who competed in the men's shot put event at the 1956 Summer Olympics. He won seven consecutive Australian shot put national championship titles.
