= John Farrington (athlete) =

Australian long-distance runner (1942–2025)

John Allan Farrington (2 July 1942 – 15 June 2025) was an Australian long-distance runner, who represented his native country in the men's marathon at the 1968 Summer Olympics. There he finished in 43rd position, clocking 2:50:16.8. He came in fifth in the same event at the 1974 Commonwealth Games. Farrington claimed four national titles in the marathon (1969, 1970, 1974, and 1975).

His PR in the marathon came at the 1973 New South Wales Championships in which he ran 2:11:12.6, which was the fastest marathon in the world that year. In the 1972 Fukuoka Marathon, he finished in second place behind Frank Shorter with a 2:12:00.4 performance. He placed second behind Derek Clayton at the 1971 Australian Championship, running 2:12:14.

Excluding the 1977 Choysa Marathon in New Zealand which was a short course, Farrington ran 14 marathons in under 2 hours, 20 minutes, the world-class standard of that time. He won 11 marathons overall in his career.

Farrington died on 15 June 2025, at the age of 82.

== Achievements ==
Year	Competition	Venue	Position	Event	Notes
Representing Australia
1968	Australian Championship	Hobart, Australia	2nd	Marathon	2:16:41.4
1970	Australian Championship	Werribee, Australia	1st	Marathon	2:15:27
1970	Hamilton Marathon	Hamilton, New Zealand	1st	Marathon	2:18:18
1970	Fukuoka Marathon	Fukuoka, Japan	6th	Marathon	2:12:58.4
1971	Australian Championship	Hobart, Australia	2nd	Marathon	2:12:14
1971	Winstone Marathon	Hamilton, New Zealand	1st	Marathon	2:15:46
1971	Fukuoka Marathon	Fukuoka, Japan	6th	Marathon	2:17:41
1972	Košice Peace Marathon	Košice, Czechoslovakia	1st	Marathon	2:17:34
1972	Fukuoka Marathon	Fukuoka, Japan	2nd	Marathon	2:12:00.4
1973	New South Wales Championships	Richmond, Australia	1st	Marathon	2:11:12.6 PR
1974	Commonwealth Games	Christchurch, New Zealand	5th	Marathon	2:14:04
1974	New South Wales Championship	Richmond, Australia	1st	Marathon	2:17:31
1974	Australian Championship	Roseworthy, Australia	1st	Marathon	2:17:23
1975	Australian Championship	Point Cook, Australia	1st	Marathon	2:17:20

== Sources ==
- Evans, Hilary; Gjerde, Arild; Heijmans, Jeroen; Mallon, Bill; et al. "John Farrington". Olympics at Sports-Reference.com. Sports Reference LLC. Archived from the original on 4 November 2012.
