= Robert Prentice =

Australian long-distance runner

Robert Archibald Prentice (4 July 1917 – 19 May 1987) was an Australian long-distance runner who competed in the 1952 Summer Olympics.
