= Geoff Smith (decathlete) =

Australian decathlete

Medal record

Men's athletics

Representing Australia

Commonwealth Games
Gold medal – first place	1970 Edinburgh	Decathlon

Geoffrey "Geoff" John Smith (born 6 March 1945) is a former Australian track and field athlete who competed in the decathlon.

A schoolteacher at Picnic Point High School in New South Wales, in January 1970 he broke the British, Commonwealth and Australian records when he won the New South Wales decathlon. He won the gold medal in the decathlon at the 1970 Commonwealth Games in Edinburgh.
