= Bob Grant (athlete) =

Australian athlete

Personal information
- Nationality: Australian
- Born: 26 April 1934 Shepparton, Victoria, Australia
- Died: 25 June 2007 (aged 73)

Sport
- Sport: Athletics
- Event: Javelin throw

Bob Grant (26 April 1934 – 25 June 2007) was an Australian athlete. He competed in the men's javelin throw at the 1956 Summer Olympics.
