= Don MacMillan =

Australian middle-distance runner

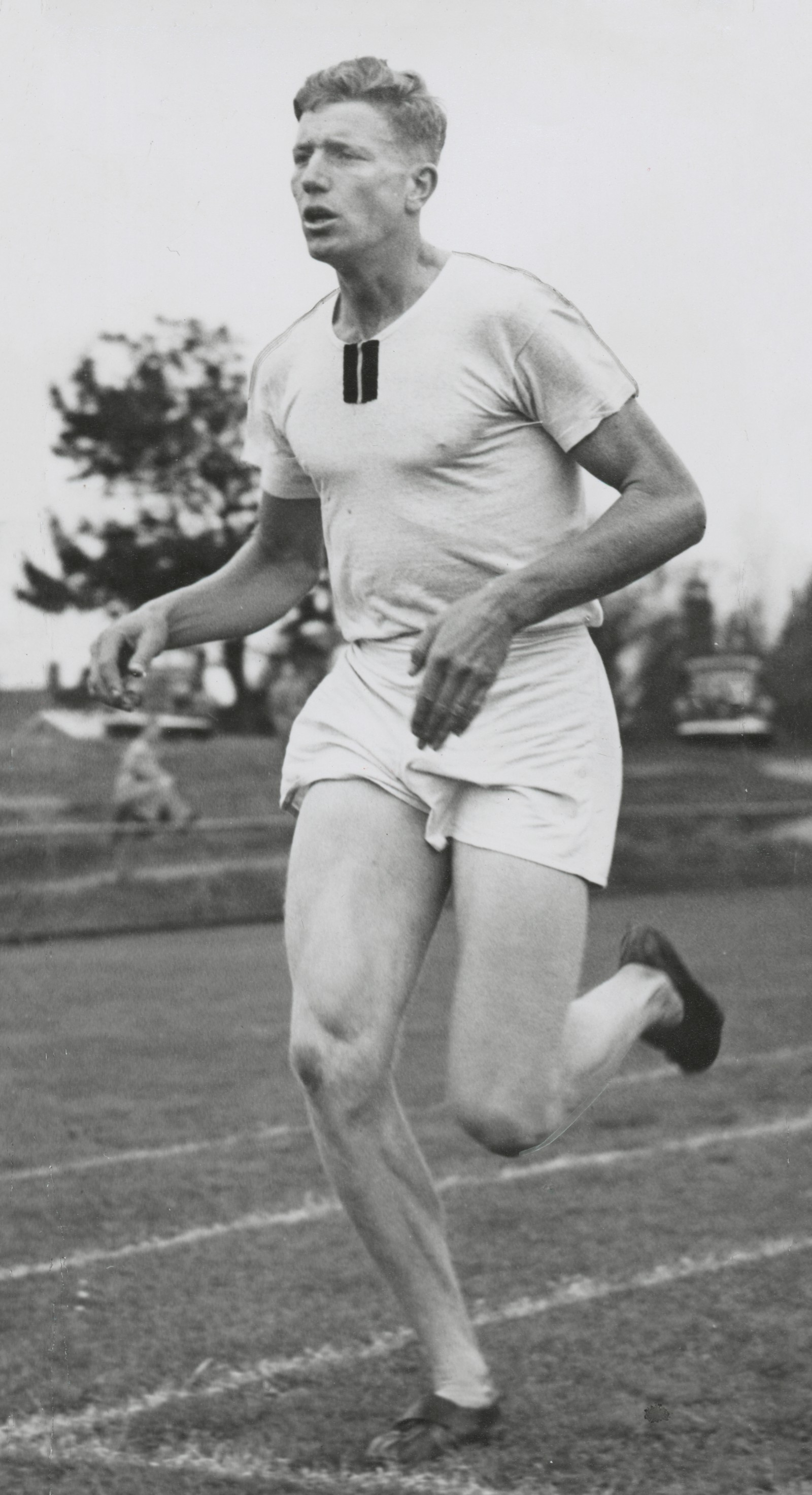
- MacMillan in 1948

Personal information
- Nationality: Australian
- Born: 5 January 1928
- Died: 19 November 2004 (aged 76)
- Height: 190 cm (6 ft 3 in)
- Weight: 85 kg (187 lb)

Sport
- Sport: Middle-distance running
- Events: 800 m, 1500 m, mile
- Club: Geelong Guild Athletics Club

Achievements and titles
- Personal bests: 800 m – 1:50.3 (1954); 1500 m – 3:49.8 (1952); Mile – 4:05.8 (1955)
Medal record
Representing Australia
British Empire and Commonwealth Games
Bronze medal – third place	1954 Vancouver	4×440 yd

Donald Robertson Thomson MacMillan (5 January 1928 – 19 November 2004) was an Australian middle-distance runner. He competed in the 800 metres at the 1952 and 1956 Summer Olympics, but failed to reach the finals. In 1952, he placed ninth in the final of the 1500 m event. At the British Empire and Commonwealth Games, MacMillan finished seventh over 1 mile in 1950, and won a bronze medal in the 4×440 yd relay in 1954.
