= John Vernon (athlete) =

Australian high jumper (1929–2019)

John Ballantyne Vernon (3 September 1929 – 21 June 2019) was an Australian high jumper who competed in the 1956 Summer Olympics.

Personal Best: High Jump – 2.019 (1954).

He was married to Jenifer ford and has three sons, Peter, David, and Timothy. He has 6 grandchildren, Ella, Flynn, Archie, Freya, Sam and Nellie.

He attended Ballarat grammar where he first picked up high jump. He later went on to become an architect.
