= Dave Stephens (runner) =

Australian long-distance runner (1928–2024)

Dave Stephens (11 November 1928 – 5 November 2024) was an Australian long-distance runner and local identity in Carlton, Victoria who competed in the 1956 Summer Olympics. Stephens was known during his career as The Flying Milkman for his milk delivery round in West Footscray.

== Early career ==
Stephens attended Williamstown High School, and while in first form in 1941 he failed to qualify for his house sports team. After dedicating himself to track events, he became school champion in four years. Still largely unknown in 1953, Stephens competed in the athletics competition of the 4th World Festival of Youth and Students in Bucharest, Romania, aiming to meet and learn the training regime of Emil Zatopek. The two formed a friendship, and Stephens trained with Zatopek for several days in Prague, Czechoslovakia before returning to Melbourne. He continued implementing these training lessons at home, and began achieving world-class times over distances of 3 and 6 miles.

== Championship performance ==
Stephens was further trained by coach Percy Cerutty, though Stephens was too 'free spirited' for the arrangement to last for long. Stephens won the 3 and 6 mile events at the 1955 Australian Athletics Championships in Adelaide. The temperature during the 6 mile race was 46 °C (115 F), and Stephens yelled abuse at race officials as he passed them each lap for scheduling the event during the peak heat of the day. An official enquiry was convened to consider disqualification, to which Stephens apologised, telling the panel that the "heat must have got to me ... and I went troppo!" He was awarded the gold medal.

Stephens set the 6 mile world record on 25 January 1956 at Olympic Park Stadium with a time of 27 minutes and 54.0 seconds. This was the first time an Australian had set a middle-distance world record at an Australian event. Ron Clarke, then 17-years old, witnessed this performance and was later quoted as saying "I was pretty young, and those races showed me for the first time that athletics could be exciting" and "Subconsciously, watching Stephens' races helped me come to the decision to compete as a club athlete instead of continuing to play cricket."

Prior to the Olympics, however, he suffered a heel spur injury and as a result finished 20th in that event.

== Personal life and death ==
After his running career, Stephens became a teacher at Williamstown South School. He died in Melbourne on 5 November 2024, at the age of 95.
