= Bruce Peever =

Australian pole vaulter

Bruce Peever (4 September 1931 – 4 May 1998) was an Australian pole vaulter who competed in the 1956 Summer Olympics. He finished seventh in the 1954 British Empire and Commonwealth Games pole vault.
