= Albie Thomas =

Australian runner

Personal information
- Full name: Albert George Thomas
- Born: 8 February 1935 Hurstville, New South Wales, Australia
- Died: 27 October 2013 (aged 78) Unconfirmed
Medal record
Men's athletics
Representing Australia
Commonwealth Games
Silver medal – second place	1958 Cardiff	3 miles
Bronze medal – third place	1958 Cardiff	One mile

Albert George Thomas OAM (8 February 1935 – 27 October 2013) was an Australian middle- and long-distance runner who set world records at two miles and three miles. He was born in Hurstville, New South Wales.

== Career ==
Thomas set a new world record (13:10.6) for three miles at Santry, Ireland, on 9 July 1958. He returned to Santry later that summer. On 6 August, he was the pacemaker in Herb Elliott's mile world record of 3:54.5; he had enough strength left to finish the race in 3:58.6, his first four-minute mile. The following day, he ran two miles in 8:32.0, also a world record.

Thomas competed in the Olympics in 1956, 1960 and 1964, running 5000 metres on all three occasions and also participating in the 1500 metres the latter two times. His best Olympic finish was a 5th place in 1956. He also competed in the British Empire and Commonwealth Games in 1958 and 1962; in the 1958 Games in Cardiff he won a bronze medal in the mile run and a silver in the 3 mile race.

Albie was awarded a Medal of the Order of Australia, Australian Sports Medal, Centenary Medal, and has been admitted to the New South Wales Government Hall of Champions. He was awarded a Merit Award and conferred with Life Membership of St. George District Athletics Club.

Thomas died, aged 78, on 27 October 2013.
