= Graeme Rootham =

Australian middle-distance runner

Personal information
- Nationality: Australian
- Born: 7 March 1948 (age 78)

Sport
- Sport: Middle-distance running
- Event: 800 metres

Graeme Lindsay Rootham (born 7 March 1948) is an Australian middle-distance runner. He competed in the men's 800 metres at the 1972 Summer Olympics.
