= Graham Thomas (athlete) =

Australian middle-distance runner

Personal information
- Full name: Graham Edward Thomas
- Nationality: Australian
- Born: 1 February 1931
- Died: 1998 (aged 66–67)

Sport
- Sport: Middle-distance running
- Event: Steeplechase

Graham Edward Thomas (1 February 1931 – 1998) was an Australian middle-distance runner. He competed in the men's 3000 metres steeplechase at the 1956 Summer Olympics.
