= Charles Green (athlete) =

Australian hurdler (1921–2009)

Personal information
- Nationality: Australian
- Born: 15 August 1921 Albany, Western Australia
- Died: 6 May 2009 (aged 87)

Sport
- Sport: Track & Field
- Event: 110m hurdles
- Club: University of Melbourne; St. Stephens Harriers

Charles Richard Green (21 August 1921 – 6 May 2009) was an Australian athlete. He competed in the 110m hurdles at the 1948 Summer Olympics but he failed to advance past the first round in either event. He retired from competitive athletics after the Olympics to begin a long and distinguished career in medicine.

Green finished second behind Joe Birrell in the 120 yards hurdles event at the British 1948 AAA Championships.
