= Kerry O'Brien (athlete) =

Australian runner (1946–2025)

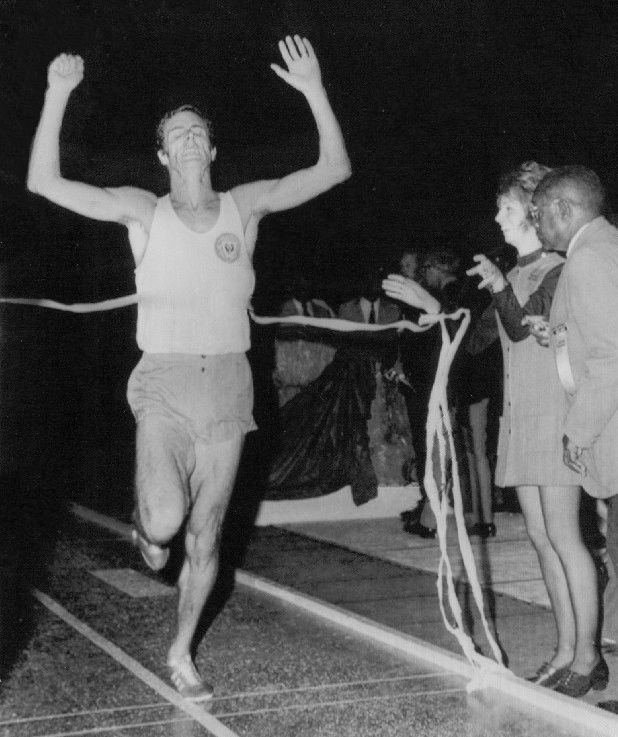
- O'Brien in 1971

Personal information
- Born: 17 April 1946 Port Augusta, South Australia, Australia
- Died: 13 December 2025 (aged 79)
- Height: 180 cm (5 ft 11 in)
- Weight: 70 kg (154 lb)

Sport
- Sport: Athletics
- Event(s): Mile-10,000 m, steeplechase
- Club: UTEP Miners, El Paso

Achievements and titles
- Personal best(s): 5000 m – 13:37.2 (1970); 10,000 m – 28:43.6 (1969); 3000 mS – 8:21.98 (1970)
Medal record
Representing Australia
Commonwealth Games
Silver medal – second place	1966 Kingston	Steeplechase

Kerry Dennis O'Brien (17 April 1946 – 13 December 2025) was an Australian runner. Competing in the steeplechase he won a silver medal at the 1966 British Empire and Commonwealth Games and finished fourth at the 1968 Summer Olympics. He held the world record in this event between 1970 and 1972. At the 1970 Commonwealth Games, O'Brien fell at the penultimate water-jump, while leading, and failed to finish the race. He also fell during the 1972 Olympics. He retired in 1973 having won nine Australian titles in the steeplechase, 5000 m and cross-country running. O'Brien died on 13 December 2025, at the age of 79.

== International competitions ==
Year	Competition	Venue	Position	Notes
1966	British Empire and Commonwealth Games	Kingston, Jamaica	8th	1 mile
1966	British Empire and Commonwealth Games	Kingston, Jamaica	2nd	3000 m steeplechase
1968	Olympic Games	Mexico City, Mexico	4th	3000 m steeplechase
1969	Pacific Conference Games	Tokyo, Japan	1st	3000 m steeplechase
1970	British Commonwealth Games	Edinburgh, Scotland	8th	10,000 m
1970	British Commonwealth Games	Edinburgh, Scotland	DNF	3000 m steeplechase
1972	Olympic Games	Munich, West Germany	DNF	3000 m steeplechase
1973	Pacific Conference Games	Toronto, Canada	1st	3000 m steeplechase

Records
Preceded by Vladimir Dudin	Men's 3000 m steeplechase world record holder 4 July 1970 – 14 September 1972	Succeeded by Anders Gärderud
Sporting positions
Preceded by Jouko Kuha	Men's 3000 m steeplechase best year performance 1970–1971	Succeeded by Anders Gärderud
