= Hugh Jack =

Australian long jumper (1929–2018)

Hugh Reid Jack (19 December 1929 – 19 December 2018) was an Australian long jumper who competed in the 1956 Summer Olympics. Jack competed for Williamstown Athletics Club for 15 years and coached for more than 40 years.
