= Nick Bromley =

Australian middle-distance runner

Nicholas ("Bromdog") Bromley (born 28 March 1983 in Terrigal, New South Wales) is an Australian middle-distance athlete and four-time national 800m champion.

== Career ==
Bromley started Little Athletics when he was 6 and received a scholarship to attend Knox Grammar School in Sydney, where he graduated in 2003 after setting a Combined Associated Schools 3000m record. He competed for the UTS Northern Suburbs Athletic Club, having previously competed for Sydney University and Sydney Pacific Athletics clubs. Bromley won the national 800m title in 2005, 2006, 2007 and 2009. His personal best time over 800 metres is 1:47.05, set in 2008 in Melbourne.
