= Alf Mitchell (javelin thrower) =

Australian javelin thrower

Medal record

Men's athletics

Representing Australia

British Empire and Commonwealth Games
| Gold medal – first place | 1962 Perth | Javelin throw |

Alfred Edward Mitchell (born 18 May 1941) is an Australian former track and field athlete who competed in the javelin throw. He was just 21 when he won the gold medal at the 1962 British Empire and Commonwealth Games in Perth, Western Australia. His throw of 78.11m (256 ft 3in) was a new games record. Incumbent champion Colin Smith won the silver medal & another Australian, Nick Birks took the bronze. He was the second Australian champion in the event, after James Achurch.

Mitchell was champion at the Australian Athletics Championships in 1962. He was runner-up in 1960, 1961, 1963 and 1964. He was a former Australian junior record holder.

This promising career was cut short by injury. He later took up coaching, training regional thrower Mary Thomas, among others.
