= Gary Honey =

Australian long jumper

Personal information
- Nationality: Australian
- Born: 26 July 1959 (age 66) Melbourne, Australia
- Height: 183 cm (6 ft 0 in)
- Weight: 70 kg (154 lb)

Sport
- Sport: Athletics
- Event: Long Jump
- Club: Ivanhoe Harriers AC / Keon Park
Medal record
Men's Athletics
Representing Australia
Olympic Games
Silver medal – second place	1984 Los Angeles	Long Jump
Commonwealth Games
Gold medal – first place	1982 Brisbane	Long Jump
Gold medal – first place	1986 Edinburgh	Long Jump

Gary Ronald Honey (born 26 July 1959) is a retired long jumper from Australia. He won a silver medal at the 1984 Olympics with a jump of 8.24 metres.

== Career ==
In addition, Honey won gold medals at the 1982 and 1986 Commonwealth Games. He participated in three Summer Olympics, starting in 1980. He was ranked number 2 in the World from 1984 to 1986. He was also ranked in the top 6 in the world from 1981 to 1988. He was 10 times Australian Champion, and 11 times Victorian Champion. In 1988, Gary was the Team Captain for the Seoul Olympic Games.

Honey finished second behind Stewart Faulkner at the British 1988 AAA Championships.

Honey was inducted into the Sport Australia Hall of Fame in 2000.
