= James Achurch =

Australian javelin thrower (1928–2015)

Personal information
- Full name: James Dudley Achurch
- Nationality: Australian
- Born: 21 January 1928 Epping, New South Wales
- Died: 5 November 2015 (aged 87) Nambour, Queensland

Sport
- Country: Australia
- Sport: Athletics
- Event: Javelin throw
- Club: Thompson Estate and Eastern Suburbs Athletics
Medal record
Men's athletics
Representing Australia
British Empire and Commonwealth Games
Gold medal – first place	1954 Vancouver	Javelin
- Updated on 23 November 2015

James Dudley Achurch (21 January 1928 – 5 November 2015) was an Australian javelin thrower who competed in the 1956 Summer Olympics. He won the gold medal in the men's javelin throw event at the 1954 British Empire and Commonwealth Games in Vancouver, Canada.

Achurch discovered his talent while growing up on a farm in New South Wales and throwing rocks and rabbits. His father later sold the farm and purchased a tennis center, where James learned to play the game as well.

Over the years, Achurch worked in multiple professions, including running a passionfruit and pineapple farm, as well as a carriage builder, a house painter, and a wardsman, plus running maintenance contracts for Nambour General Hospital.
