= Ken Doubleday =

Australian athletics competitor

Personal information
- Nationality: Australian
- Born: 14 February 1926
- Died: 8 June 2014 (aged 88) Geelong, Australia
- Height: 188 cm (6 ft 2 in)
- Weight: 75 kg (165 lb)

Sport
- Sport: Athletics
- Event: hurdles/triple jump
- Club: Sandringham AC

Kenneth Leslie Doubleday (14 February 1926 – 8 June 2014) was an Australian hurdler and triple jumper who competed in the 1952 Summer Olympics and in the 1956 Summer Olympics.

Doubleday finished third behind fellow Australian Ray Weinberg in the 120 yards hurdles event at the British 1952 AAA Championships.
