= Colin McQueen =

Australian sprinter

Colin McQueen (born 12 February 1956) is an Australian retired sprinter that specialised in the 200 and 400 metres.

He won the Australian 200 metre championships in 1977, 1978, and 1979. He also won the 400 metre title in 1979. In 1977, he represented Australia/Oceania in the IAAF World Cup 200 metres where he finished 8th, then 7th in the sprint relay.
