= Bob Gardiner (race walker) =

Australian racewalker

Personal information
- Born: 22 March 1936 (age 90)
Medal record
Men's Athletics
Representing Australia
Commonwealth Games
Silver medal – second place	1970 Edinburgh	20 mile walk

Robert Charles Gardiner (born 22 March 1936) is an Australian former racewalker who competed in the 1964 Summer Olympics and in the 1968 Summer Olympics.
