= Nick Birks =

Australian athlete (born 1938)

Personal information
- Nationality: Australian
- Born: Nicholas Napier Birks; 4 June 1938 (age 88)

Sport
- Country: Australia
- Sport: Athletics
- Event: Javelin / Decathlon
Medal record
Commonwealth Games
Silver medal – second place	1966 Kingston	Javelin
Bronze medal – third place	1962 Perth	Javelin

Nicholas Napier Birks (born 4 June 1938) is an Australian former athlete active in the 1950s and 1960s.

An old boy of St Peter's College in Adelaide, Birks is the great-grandson of the founder of Charles Birks & Co, a former department store on Rundle Street. He was a nine-time national champion in the javelin and won three national titles in the decathlon. In 1961 he set a British Empire record in the javelin with a throw of 252 ft 4 inches in Sydney.

Birks featured in three editions of the British Empire and Commonwealth Games, the first in Cardiff in 1958, where he was ninth in the javelin. He won bronze in the javelin in 1962 and silver at the same event in 1966.
