= John Atkinson (athlete) =

Australian high jumper

John Atkinson (born 29 October 1963) is an Australian former high jumper who competed in the 1984 Summer Olympics. He also competed in the commonwealth games in 1986 in Edinburgh and Worlds in 1985.
