= Geoff Goodacre =

Australian hurdler (1927–2004)

Personal information
- Full name: Geoffrey Charles Goodacre
- Nationality: Australian
- Born: 18 June 1927 Blayney, New South Wales, Australia
- Died: 30 June 2004 (aged 77) Long Jetty, New South Wales, Australia

Sport
- Sport: Track and field
- Event: 400 metres hurdles
Medal record
Representing Australia
British Empire Games
| Bronze medal – third place | 1950 Auckland | 440-yard hurdles |

Geoffrey Charles Goodacre (18 June 1927 – 30 June 2004) was an Australian hurdler. He competed in the men's 400 metres hurdles at the 1956 Summer Olympics.
