= Mick McGrath (triple jumper) =

Australian triple jumper (born 1947)

Personal information
- Nationality: Australian
- Born: 28 November 1947 (age 78)
- Height: 175 cm (5 ft 9 in)
- Weight: 70 kg (154 lb)

Sport
- Sport: Athletics
- Event: Triple jump
- Club: Randwick Botany Harriers
Medal record
Men's Athletics
Representing Australia
Commonwealth Games
Silver medal – second place	1970 Edinburgh	Triple Jump

Gerald Michael McGrath (born 28 November 1947) is an Australian former triple jumper who competed in the 1970 Commonwealth Games and the 1972 Summer Olympics.

== Biography ==
McGrath attended the University of Melbourne, gaining a full blue in athletics in 1969.

McGrath won the British AAA Championships title at the 1975 AAA Championships.

In 2014 he was named by Athletics Victoria in the Victorian all-time Commonwealth Games team.
