= Richard James (sprinter, born 1956) =

Australian sprinter and academic

Richard James (born 9 March 1956) is an Australian academic and former sprinter who competed mainly in the 100 metres.

He was an Australian Junior 100 metre champion, and represented Australia in 1979 in the World Cup where he finished 6th in the 100 metres and 7th in the 4 × 100 metres relay. In 1980 he won the Australian 100 metre title.

He is a prominent Australian academic in the field of higher education research. He holds a chair in higher education at the University of Melbourne and is pro vice-chancellor (academic) and director of the Melbourne Centre for the Study of Higher Education.
