= Athletics at the 2006 Commonwealth Games – Women's 800 metres =

Women's 800 metres at the Commonwealth Games

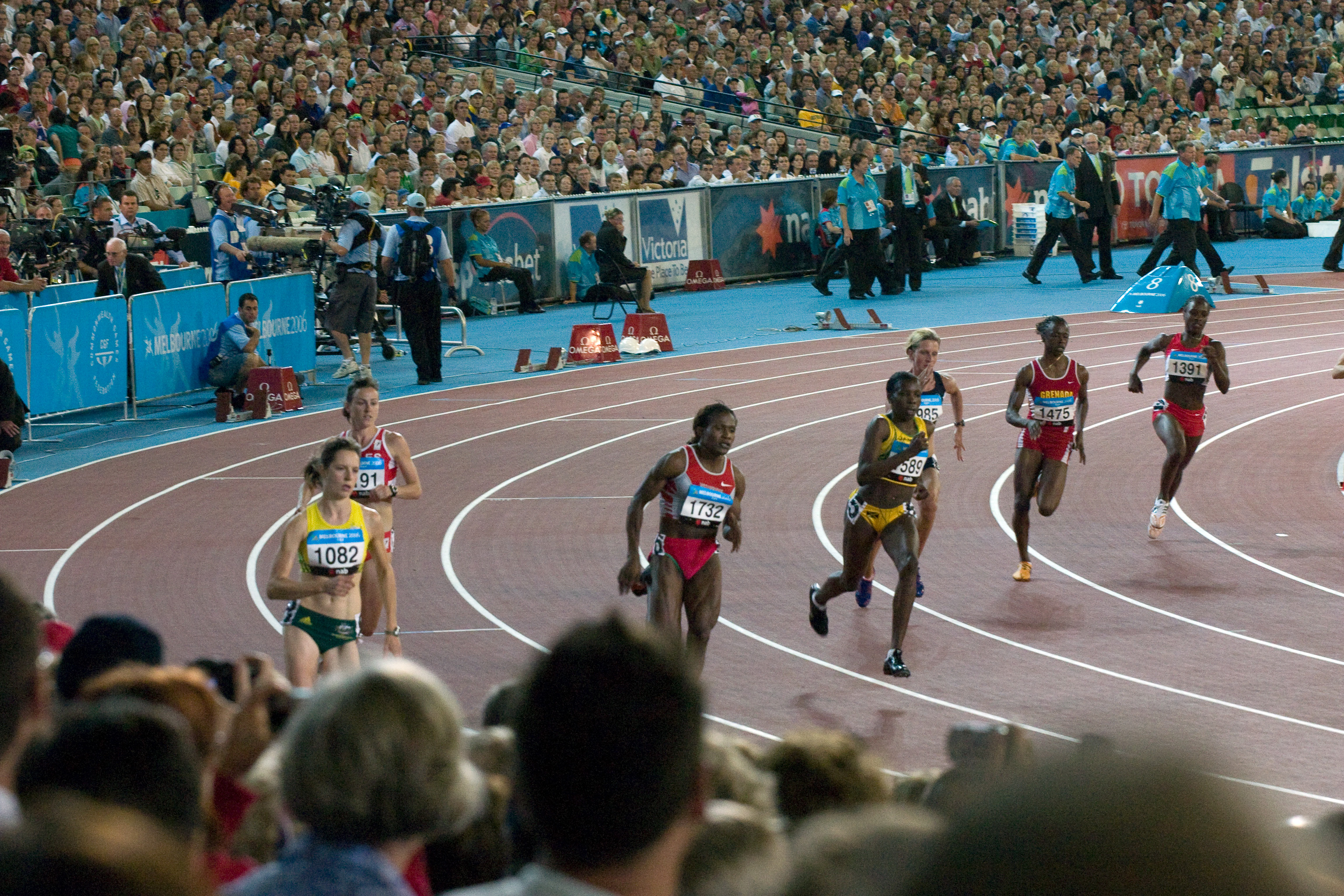
Start of the women's 800m semi-final

The women's 800 metres event at the 2006 Commonwealth Games was held on March 22–24.

== Medalists ==
| Gold | Silver | Bronze |
|---|---|---|
| Janeth Jepkosgei; Kenya | Kenia Sinclair; Jamaica | Maria Mutola; Mozambique |

== Results ==
=== Heats ===
Qualification: First 2 of each heat (Q) and the next 6 fastest (q) qualified for the semifinals.

| Rank | Heat | Name | Nationality | Time | Notes |
|---|---|---|---|---|---|
| 1 | 1 | Susan Scott | Scotland | 2:02.85 | Q |
| 2 | 5 | Maria Mutola | Mozambique | 2:03.11 | Q |
| 3 | 3 | Janeth Jepkosgei | Kenya | 2:03.24 | Q |
| 4 | 1 | Diane Cummins | Canada | 2:03.39 | Q |
| 5 | 3 | Jemma Simpson | England | 2:03.49 | Q |
| 6 | 5 | Hayley Tullett | Wales | 2:03.55 | Q, SB |
| 7 | 5 | Suzanne Walsham | Australia | 2:04.00 | q |
| 8 | 3 | Amanda Teteris | Canada | 2:04.04 | q |
| 9 | 2 | Lebogang Phalula | South Africa | 2:04.27 | Q |
| 10 | 3 | Leonor Piuza | Mozambique | 2:04.30 | q, PB |
| 11 | 4 | Kenia Sinclair | Jamaica | 2:04.44 | Q |
| 12 | 2 | Marian Burnett | Guyana | 2:04.50 | Q |
| 13 | 2 | Neisha Bernard-Thomas | Grenada | 2:04.68 | q |
| 14 | 2 | Elizabeth Allen | Australia | 2:04.97 | q |
| 15 | 4 | Marilyn Okoro | England | 2:05.01 | Q |
| 16 | 4 | Pinki Parmanik | India | 2:05.18 | q |
| 17 | 3 | Grace Ebora | Nigeria | 2:05.24 | |
| 18 | 4 | Katharine Vermeulen | Canada | 2:05.29 | |
| 19 | 1 | Erica Sigmont | Australia | 2:05.37 | |
| 20 | 2 | Caroline Chepkwony | Kenya | 2:05.70 | PB |
| 21 | 5 | Melissa de Leon | Trinidad and Tobago | 2:06.04 | |
| 22 | 4 | Lwiza John | Tanzania | 2:06.64 | SB |
| 23 | 5 | Elizet Banda | Zambia | 2:07.78 | PB |
| 24 | 1 | Dina Phalula | South Africa | 2:07.82 | |
| 25 | 2 | Salome Dell | Papua New Guinea | 2:08.13 | PB |
| 26 | 1 | Moleboheng Mafata | Lesotho | 2:12.20 | PB |
| 27 | 1 | Bushra Parveen | Pakistan | 2:12.54 | |

=== Semifinals ===
Qualification: First 3 of each semifinal (Q) and the next 2 fastest (q) qualified for the final.

| Rank | Heat | Name | Nationality | Time | Notes |
|---|---|---|---|---|---|
| 1 | 1 | Maria Mutola | Mozambique | 1:59.03 | Q |
| 2 | 1 | Kenia Sinclair | Jamaica | 1:59.62 | Q |
| 3 | 1 | Susan Scott | Scotland | 2:00.31 | Q, SB |
| 4 | 1 | Marilyn Okoro | England | 2:00.84 | q, PB |
| 5 | 1 | Neisha Bernard-Thomas | Grenada | 2:01.02 | q, PB |
| 6 | 2 | Janeth Jepkosgei | Kenya | 2:01.34 | Q |
| 7 | 2 | Diane Cummins | Canada | 2:01.58 | Q |
| 8 | 2 | Jemma Simpson | England | 2:01.78 | Q, PB |
| 9 | 2 | Leonor Piuza | Mozambique | 2:01.84 | PB |
| 10 | 1 | Hayley Tullett | Wales | 2:02.44 | SB |
| 11 | 2 | Pinki Parmanik | India | 2:03.83 | PB |
| 12 | 2 | Suzanne Walsham | Australia | 2:04.02 | |
| 13 | 1 | Amanda Teteris | Canada | 2:04.77 | |
| 14 | 1 | Elizabeth Allen | Australia | 2:05.43 | |
| 15 | 2 | Marian Burnett | Guyana | 2:07.13 | |
| 16 | 2 | Lebogang Phalula | South Africa | 2:08.20 | |

=== Final ===
| Rank | Name | Nationality | Time | Notes |
|---|---|---|---|---|
| 1st place, gold medalist(s) | Janeth Jepkosgei | Kenya | 1:57.88 | |
| 2nd place, silver medalist(s) | Kenia Sinclair | Jamaica | 1:58.16 | PB |
| 3rd place, bronze medalist(s) | Maria Mutola | Mozambique | 1:58.77 | SB |
| 4 | Susan Scott | Scotland | 1:59.02 | PB |
| 5 | Diane Cummins | Canada | 1:59.31 | SB |
| 6 | Jemma Simpson | England | 2:01.11 | PB |
| 7 | Marilyn Okoro | England | 2:01.65 | |
| 8 | Neisha Bernard-Thomas | Grenada | 2:01.96 | |
