= 2011–12 Australian Athletics Championships =

- Dates: 13–15 April 2012
- Host city: Melbourne, Australia
- Venue: Lakeside Stadium
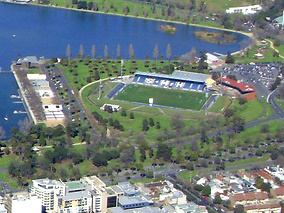

The 2011–12 Australian Athletics Championships was the 90th edition of the national championship in outdoor track and field for Australia. It was held from 13–15 April 2012 at the Lakeside Stadium in Melbourne. It served as a selection meeting for Australia at the 2012 Summer Olympics. The 10,000 metres event took place separately at the Zatopek 10K on 10 December 2011 at the same venue.

== Medal summary ==
=== Men ===
Event	Gold		Silver		Bronze	
100 metres (Wind: -0.4 m/s)	Josh Ross; Victoria	10.23	Tim Leathart; New South Wales	10.48	Joseph Millar; New Zealand (NZL)	10.49
200 metres (Wind: +0.2 m/s)	Joseph Millar; New Zealand (NZL)	21.27	Tama Toki; New Zealand (NZL)	21.43	Sean Wroe; Victoria	21.44
400 metres	Steven Solomon; New South Wales	45.54	Alex Beck; Queensland	46.30	Ben Offereins; Western Australia	46.30
800 metres	Johnny Rayner; Victoria	1:48.10	Alexander Rowe; Victoria	1:48.49	James Gurr; New South Wales	1:48.51
1500 metres	Jeff Riseley; Victoria	3:47.78	James Kaan; New South Wales	3:48.00	Jeremy Roff; New South Wales	3:49.40
5000 metres	Harry Summers; New South Wales	14:03.84	Liam Adams; Victoria	14:08.62	Stephen Dinneen; Victoria	14:39.84
10,000 metres	Emmanuel Bett; Kenya (KEN)	27:39.33	Bitan Karoki; Kenya (KEN)	27:40.11	Micah Kogo; Kenya (KEN)	27:50.50
110 metres hurdles (Wind: +0.2 m/s)	Siddhanth Thingalaya; India (IND)	13.66	Rayzam Shah Wan Sofian; Malaysia (MAS)	13.81	Masayuki Iida; Japan (JPN)	14.01
400 metres hurdles	Tristan Thomas; Tasmania	51.37	Mowen Boino; Papua New Guinea (PNG)	51.59	Cameron French; New Zealand (NZL)	52.66
3000 metres steeplechase	Peter Nowill; Queensland	8:44.47	James Nipperess; New South Wales	8:48.45	Chris Discombe; Victoria	8:52.47
High jump	Nick Moroney; New South Wales	2.15 m	Thomas Brennan; Western Australia	2.10 m	Chris Armet; Victoria	2.10 m
Pole vault	Joel Pocklington; Victoria	5.15 m	James Filshie; Victoria	4.90 m	Max Mishchenko; Victoria	4.75 m
Long jump	Frederic Erin; France (FRA)	7.70 m (-0.3 m/s)	Scott Crowe; Victoria	7.69 m (+0.2 m/s)	Shaun Fletcher; Queensland	7.42 m (+1.3 m/s)
Triple jump	Alwyn Jones; Victoria	16.32 m (0.0 m/s)	Adam Rabone; Victoria	15.94 m (+1.4 m/s)	Alex Lorraway; Victoria	15.74 m (+1.5 m/s)
Shot put	Emanuele Fuamatu; New South Wales	18.62 m	Damien Birkinhead; Victoria	18.14 m	Chris Gaviglio; Queensland	17.56 m
Discus throw	Benn Harradine; Victoria	63.58 m	Scott Martin; Victoria	59.41 m	Aaron Neighbour; Victoria	56.64 m
Hammer throw	Tim Driesen; Victoria	70.55 m	Hiroshi Noguchi; Japan (JPN)	66.25 m	Huw Peacock; Tasmania	61.85 m
Javelin throw	Joshua Robinson; Queensland	78.31 m	Hamish Peacock; Tasmania	75.62 m	Benjamin Baker; New South Wales	74.66 m
Decathlon	Brent Newdick; New Zealand (NZL)	8057 pts	Franck Logel; France (FRA)	7655 pts	Jarrod Sims; South Australia	7456 pts

=== Women ===
Event	Gold		Silver		Bronze	
100 metres (Wind: +0.5 m/s)	Melissa Breen; Australian Capital Territory	11.41	Charlotte van Veenendaal; Victoria	11.79	Hayley Butler; New South Wales	11.80
200 metres (Wind: -0.3 m/s)	Melissa Breen; Australian Capital Territory	23.30	Toea Wisil; Papua New Guinea (PNG)	23.69	Monica Brennan; Victoria	23.72
400 metres	Joanne Cuddihy; Ireland (IRL)	51.69	Caitlin Sargent; Queensland	53.21	Kristie Baillie; New Zealand (NZL)	53.26
800 metres	Tamsyn Manou; Victoria	2:02.00	Zoe Buckman; Victoria	2:04.47	Rosie Kelly; South Australia	2:05.03
1500 metres	Kaila McKnight; Victoria	4:18.02	Bridey Delaney; New South Wales	4:18.26	Camille Buscomb; New Zealand (NZL)	4:22.98
5000 metres	Kaila McKnight; Victoria	16:24.56	Melanie Daniels; Tasmania	16:32.95	Belinda Martin; New South Wales	16:50.55
10,000 metres	Joyce Chepkirui; Kenya (KEN)	31:26.10	Emily Chebet; Kenya (KEN)	31:30.22	Emily Brichacek; Australian Capital Territory	33:02.55
100 metres hurdles	Shannon McCann; Western Australia	13.48	Yuka Nomura; Japan (JPN)	13.61	Brianna Beahan; Western Australia	13.78
400 metres hurdles	Jess Gulli; Victoria	57.96	Lyndsay Pekin; Western Australia	58.08	Tessa Consedine; Victoria	59.35
3000 metres steeplechase	Milly Clark; New South Wales	10:05.60	Victoria Mitchell; Victoria	10:08.91	Eleanor Wardleworth; South Australia	10:47.21
High jump	Miyuki Fukumoto; Japan (JPN)	1.86 m	Ashleigh Reid; Queensland	1.80 m	Lauren Foote; South Australia	1.75 m
Pole vault	Vicky Parnov; Western Australia	4.20 m	Nina Kennedy; Western Australia	4.00 m	Pascale Gacon; France (FRA)	3.90 m
Long jump	Kerrie Perkins; Australian Capital Territory	6.70 m (+3.1 m/s)	Brooke Stratton; Victoria	6.56 m (+0.8 m/s)	Jessica Penney; Australian Capital Territory	6.43 m (+1.6 m/s)
Triple jump	Ellen Pettitt; Victoria	13.66 m (+2.4 m/s)	Linda Allen; Victoria	13.24 m (+1.7 m/s)	Nneka Okpala; New Zealand (NZL)	12.97 m (+0.6 m/s)
Shot put	Dani Samuels; New South Wales	16.65 m	Ana Pouhila; Tonga (TGA)	15.97 m	Margaret Satupai; Samoa (SAM)	15.92 m
Discus throw	Dani Samuels; New South Wales	62.34 m	Kim Mulhall; Victoria	56.02 m	Alifatou Djibril; South Australia	52.74 m
Hammer throw	Gabrielle Neighbour; Victoria	66.20 m	Odette LaFourcade; Chile (CHI)	57.73 m	Natalie Debeljuh; Victoria	57.52 m
Javelin throw	Kim Mickle; Western Australia	61.70 m	Kathryn Mitchell; Victoria	59.23 m	Risa Miyashita; Japan (JPN)	54.16 m
Heptathlon	Megan Wheatley; Western Australia	5832 pts	Ellinore Hallin; Sweden (SWE)	5756 pts	Veronica Torr; Queensland	5590 pts
