= Burnie Ten =

Road Race

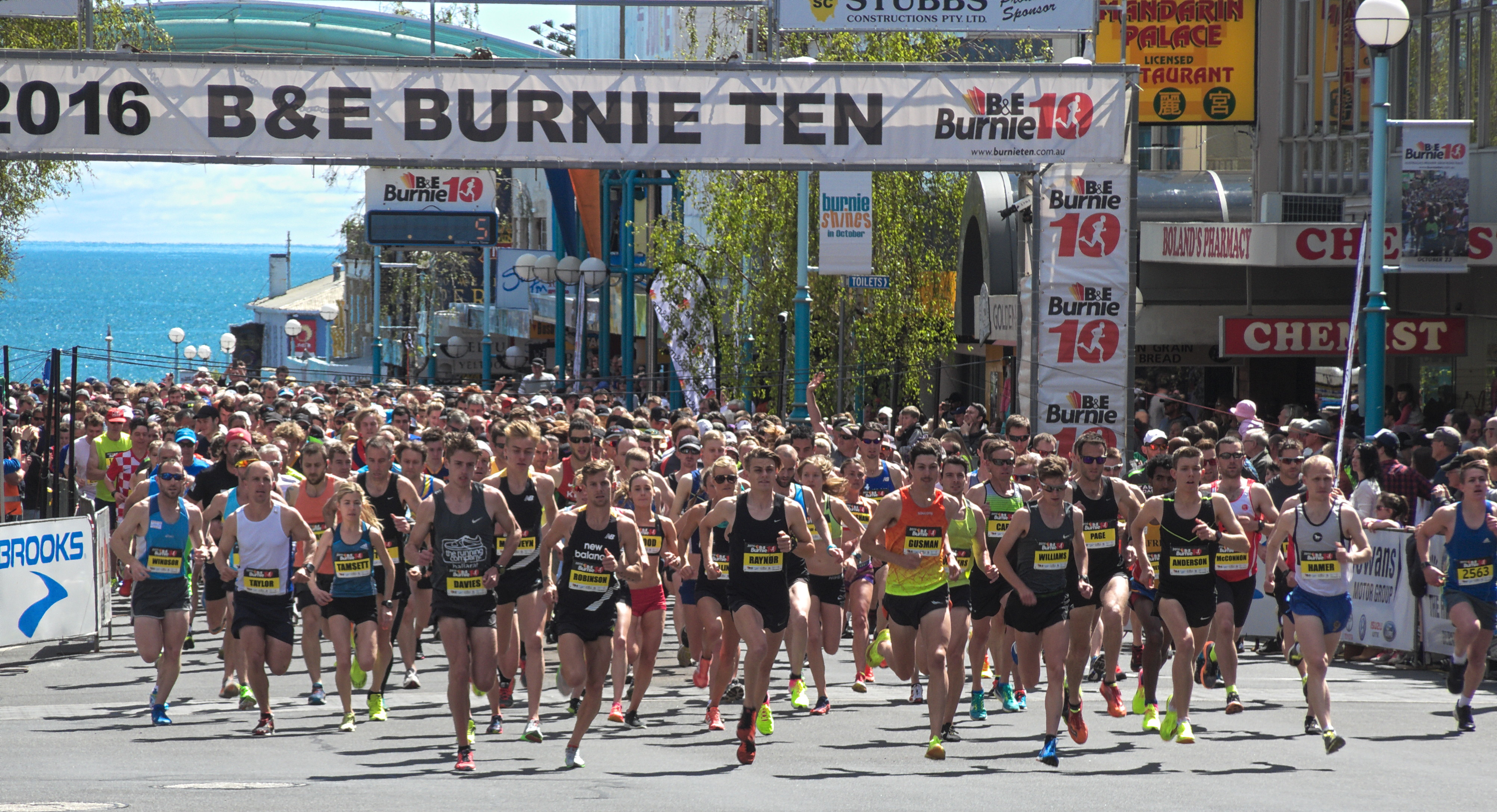
- The start in 2016
- Date: A Sunday in October
- Location: Burnie
- Event type: road
- Distance: 10 km (also 5 km, Wheelchair 10 km)
- Established: 1985
- Course records: 27:43 (M; 2022, Jack Rayner); 31:21 (F; 2026, Georgie Grgec)
- Website: https://www.burnieten.com.au/

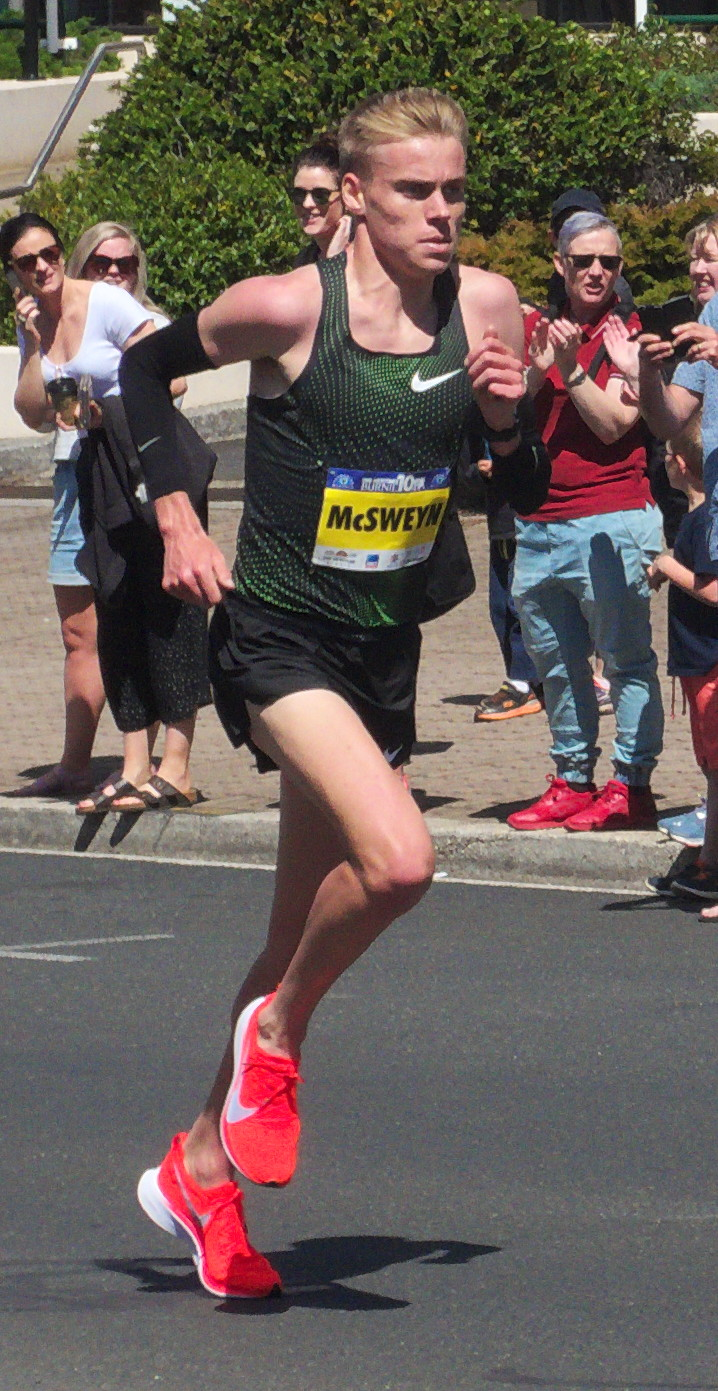
Stewart McSweyn winning the 2018 event

The Burnie Ten is an Australian 10 km road race held on a Sunday in October every year in Burnie in North West Tasmania along Emu Bay.

== Route ==
The race starts north of Wilson/Cattley Street intersection and proceeds south along Wilson Street to the Bass Highway. It follows the highway east, past the Burnie Yacht Club and Wivenhoe to the five kilometer turning point, then returns along the same route to the start-finish line.

In 2015, a 5km event was added with 489 participating in the five kilometre event with the half way point near the Emu River.

In 2020, in response to the COVID-19 pandemic the event was held virtually, with entrants able to complete the race in their own time on either 17 or 18 October.

== Selected results ==
Year	Male Winner	Female Winner
2026	Edward Marks	Georgie Grgec
2025	Adam Goddard	Leanne Pompeani
2024	Sam Clifford	Leanne Pompeani
2023	Jack Rayner	Sinead Diver
2022	Jack Rayner	Leanne Pompeani
2021	Isaac Heyne	Caitlin Adams
2020	Held "virtually" due to the COVID-19 pandemic	
2019	Jordan Williamsz	Genevieve Gregson
2018	Stewart McSweyn	Emily Brichacek
2017	Stewart McSweyn	Eloise Wellings
2016	Brett Robinson	Eloise Wellings
2015	Brett Robinson	Victoria Mitchell
2014	David McNeill	Susan Kuijken
2013	Cameron Page	Nikki Chapple
2012	Collis Birmingham	Nikki Chapple
2011	James Nipperess	Emily Brichacek
2010	Liam Adams	Lara Tamsett
2009	Mark Tucker	Lara Tamsett
2008	Ryan Gregson	Lara Tamsett
2007	Martin Dent	Lisa Jane Weightman
2006	Collis Birmingham	Anna Thompson
2005	Martin Dent	Kerryn McCann
2004	Mark Tucker	Haley McGregor
2003	Craig Mottram	Haley McGregor
2002	Craig Mottram	Benita Johnson
2001	Stephen Moneghetti	Susie Power
2000	Shaun Creighton	Susie Michellson
1999	Joseph Waweru	Kylie Risk
1998	Mizan Mehari	Kylie Risk
1997	Darren Wilson	Kate Anderson
1996	Darren Wilson	Susan Hobson
1995	Shaun Creighton	Kerryn McCann
1994	Darren Wilson	Carolyn Schuwalow
1993	Stephen Moneghetti	Jackie Hallam
1992	Pat Carroll	Jenny Lund
1991	Andrew Lloyd	Krishna Stanton
1990	Andrew Lloyd	Jenny Lund
1989	John Andrews	Susan Hobson
1988	Stephen Moneghetti	Maree McDonagh
1987	Pat Carroll	Tani Ruckle
1986	Andrew Loyd	Anne Lord
1985	Stephen Moneghetti	Kerith Duncanson

All information from The ‘Burnie Ten Honour Board’
