= 2009 IAAF World Cross Country Championships – Senior women's race =

Senior women's race at the 2009 IAAF World Cross Country Championships
- Organisers: IAAF
- Edition: 37th
- Date: March 28
- Host city: Amman, Jordan
- Venue: Al Bisharat Golf Course
- Events: 1
- Distances: 8 km – Senior women
- Participation: 96 athletes from 34 nations

The Senior Women Race at the 2009 IAAF World Cross Country Championships was held at the Al Bisharat Golf Course in Amman, Jordan, on March 28, 2009. Reports of the event were given in The New York Times and for the IAAF.

Complete results for individuals, and for teams were published.

== Race results ==
=== Senior women's race (8 km) ===
==== Individual ====
Rank	Athlete	Country	Time
1st place, gold medalist(s)	Florence Jebet Kiplagat	Kenya	26:13
2nd place, silver medalist(s)	Linet Chepkwemoi Masai	Kenya	26:16
3rd place, bronze medalist(s)	Meselech Melkamu	Ethiopia	26:19
4	Lineth Chepkurui	Kenya	26:23
5	Wude Ayalew	Ethiopia	26:23
6	Hilda Kibet	Netherlands	26:43
7	Ann Karindi Mwangi	Kenya	26:49
8	Gelete Burka	Ethiopia	26:58
9	Maryam Yusuf Jamal	Bahrain	27:00
10	Iness Chepkesis Chenonge	Kenya	27:00
11	Pauline Chemning Korikwiang	Kenya	27:03
12	Mamitu Deska	Ethiopia	27:04
13	Kim Smith	New Zealand	27:05
14	Sentayehu Ejigu	Ethiopia	27:40
15	Ana Dulce Félix	Portugal	27:42
16	Sara Moreira	Portugal	27:54
17	Lisa Jane Weightman	Australia	27:59
18	Yuko Shimizu	Japan	28:02
19	Ana Dias	Portugal	28:05
20	Judith Plá	Spain	28:08
21	Julie Culley	United States	28:08
22	Anália Rosa	Portugal	28:10
23	Siham Hilali	Morocco	28:14
24	Alessandra Aguilar	Spain	28:18
25	Sarah Ramadhan	Tanzania	28:18
26	Lara Tamsett	Australia	28:19
27	Bouchra Chaâbi	Morocco	28:19
28	Mimi Belete	Bahrain	28:21
29	Lebogang Phalula	South Africa	28:23
30	Koren Jelela	Ethiopia	28:29
31	Diana Martín	Spain	28:31
32	Kenza Dahmani	Algeria	28:33
33	Delilah DiCrescenzo	United States	28:34
34	Salima El Ouali Alami	Morocco	28:35
35	Élodie Olivarès	France	28:37
36	Rebecca Donaghue	United States	28:37
37	Catherine Cormier	Canada	28:41
38	Stephanie Twell	United Kingdom	28:46
39	Dina Lebo Phalula	South Africa	28:46
40	Kathy Newberry	United States	28:50
41	Habiba Ghribi	Tunisia	28:50
42	Jacqueline Martín	Spain	28:51
43	Yeisy Álvarez	Venezuela	28:51
44	Zhu Yingying	China	28:53
45	Kazuka Wakatsuki	Japan	28:54
46	Maria Laghrissi	Morocco	28:55
47	Federica Dal Ri	Italy	28:55
48	Korei Omata	Japan	28:56
49	Hatti Dean	United Kingdom	29:00
50	Agnes Chikwakwa	Malawi	29:03
51	Jane Potter	United Kingdom	29:04
52	Melinda Vernon	Australia	29:04
53	Claudette Mukasakindi	Rwanda	29:05
54	Chisa Nishio	Japan	29:05
55	Sarah Tunstall	United Kingdom	29:07
56	Johanna Hermiena Van Schalkwyk	South Africa	29:07
57	Victoria Poludina	Kyrgyzstan	29:16
58	Hannah Whitmore	United Kingdom	29:19
59	Erin Densham	Australia	29:23
60	Dong Xiaoqin	China	29:23
61	Konstadína Kefalá	Greece	29:29
62	Elsa Medhane	Eritrea	29:30
63	Letekidan Gebreyohannes	Eritrea	29:33
64	Elisabete Lopes	Portugal	29:36
65	Linda Byrne	Ireland	29:36
66	Sueli Silva	Brazil	29:38
67	Chantell Widney	Canada	29:45
68	Yuki Numata	Japan	29:48
69	Samia Akbar	United States	29:51
70	Eden Tesfalem	Eritrea	29:55
71	Ezgamen Kahsay	Eritrea	30:04
72	Tomoka Inadomi	Japan	30:07
73	Rosângela Faria	Brazil	30:18
74	Tebogo Masehla	South Africa	30:24
75	Lindsey Scherf	United States	30:27
76	Chantelle Wilder	Canada	30:42
77	Jackline Sakilu	Tanzania	30:44
78	Myrette Filmalter	South Africa	30:57
79	Yirgalem Gebrekidan Beraki	Eritrea	31:10
80	Tara Palm	Australia	31:23
81	Marilyn Arsenault	Canada	31:37
82	Adriana Aparecida da Silva	Brazil	31:40
83	Mariola Konowalska	Poland	32:00
84	Asha Abdalla Khatib	Tanzania	33:17
85	Giuli Dekanadze	Georgia	33:18
86	Rehab Mohammad Ahmad	Egypt	36:14
87	Nadima Mirzoeva	Tajikistan	38:00
88	Nagah Zenatni	Libya	38:50
—	Sonia Thomas	United Kingdom	DNF
—	Cristina Jordán	Spain	DNF
—	Annemari Sandell-Hyvärinen	Finland	DNF
—	Safa Aissaoui	Tunisia	DNF
—	Laila Hmatou	Morocco	DNF
—	Hanane Ouhaddou	Morocco	DNF
—	Inês Monteiro	Portugal	DNF
—	Rachelle Malette	Canada	DNF
—	Zakia Mrisho Mohamed	Tanzania	DNS

==== Teams ====
Rank	Team	Points
1st place, gold medalist(s)	Kenya: Florence Jebet Kiplagat / 1; Linet Chepkwemoi Masai / 2; Lineth Chepkurui / 4; Ann Karindi Mwangi / 7; (Iness Chepkesis Chenonge) / (10); (Pauline Chemning Korikwiang) / (11)	14
2nd place, silver medalist(s)	Ethiopia: Meselech Melkamu / 3; Wude Ayalew / 5; Gelete Burka / 8; Mamitu Deska / 12; (Sentayehu Ejigu) / (14); (Koren Jelela) / (30)	28
3rd place, bronze medalist(s)	Portugal: Ana Dulce Félix / 15; Sara Moreira / 16; Ana Dias / 19; Anália Rosa / 22; (Elisabete Lopes) / (64); (Inês Monteiro) / (DNF)	72
4	Spain: Judith Plá / 20; Alessandra Aguilar / 24; Diana Martín / 31; Jacqueline Martín / 42; (Cristina Jordán) / (DNF)	117
5	United States: Julie Culley / 21; Delilah DiCrescenzo / 33; Rebecca Donaghue / 36; Kathy Newberry / 40; (Samia Akbar) / (69); (Lindsey Scherf) / (75)	130
6	Morocco: Siham Hilali / 23; Bouchra Chaâbi / 27; Salima El Ouali Alami / 34; Maria Laghrissi / 46; (Hanane Ouhaddou) / (DNF); (Laila Hmatou) / (DNF)	130
7	Australia: Lisa Jane Weightman / 17; Lara Tamsett / 26; Melinda Vernon / 52; Erin Densham / 59; (Tara Palm) / (80)	154
8	Japan: Yuko Shimizu / 18; Kazuka Wakatsuki / 45; Korei Omata / 48; Chisa Nishio / 54; (Yuki Numata) / (68); (Tomoka Inadomi) / (72)	165
9	United Kingdom: Stephanie Twell / 38; Hatti Dean / 49; Jane Potter / 51; Sarah Tunstall / 55; (Hannah Whitmore) / (58); (Sonia Thomas) / (DNF)	193
10	South Africa: Lebogang Phalula / 29; Dina Lebo Phalula / 39; Johanna Hermiena Van Schalkwyk / 56; Tebogo Masehla / 74; (Myrette Filmalter) / (78)	198
11	Canada: Catherine Cormier / 37; Chantell Widney / 67; Chantelle Wilder / 76; Marilyn Arsenault / 81; (Rachelle Malette) / (DNF)	261
12	Eritrea: Elsa Medhane / 62; Letekidan Gebreyohannes / 63; Eden Tesfalem / 70; Ezgamen Kahsay / 71; (Yirgalem Gebrekidan Beraki) / (79)	266

- Note: Athletes in parentheses did not score for the team result.

== Participation ==
According to an unofficial count, 96 athletes from 34 countries participated in the Senior women's race, two athletes less than the official number published.

- Algeria (1)
- Australia (5)
- Bahrain (2)
- Brazil (3)
- Canada (5)
- China (2)
- Egypt (1)
- Eritrea (5)
- Ethiopia (6)
- Finland (1)
- France (1)
- Georgia (1)
- Greece (1)
- Ireland (1)
- Italy (1)
- Japan (6)
- Kenya (6)
- Kyrgyzstan (1)
- Libya (1)
- Malawi (1)
- Morocco (6)
- Netherlands (1)
- New Zealand (1)
- Poland (1)
- Portugal (6)
- Rwanda (1)
- South Africa (5)
- Spain (5)
- Tajikistan (1)
- Tanzania (3)
- Tunisia (2)
- United Kingdom (6)
- United States (6)
- Venezuela (1)

== See also ==
- 2009 IAAF World Cross Country Championships – Senior men's race
- 2009 IAAF World Cross Country Championships – Junior men's race
- 2009 IAAF World Cross Country Championships – Junior women's race
