= 2012–13 Australian Athletics Championships =

- Dates: 11–14 April 2013
- Host city: Sydney, Australia
- Venue: Sydney Olympic Park Athletic Centre
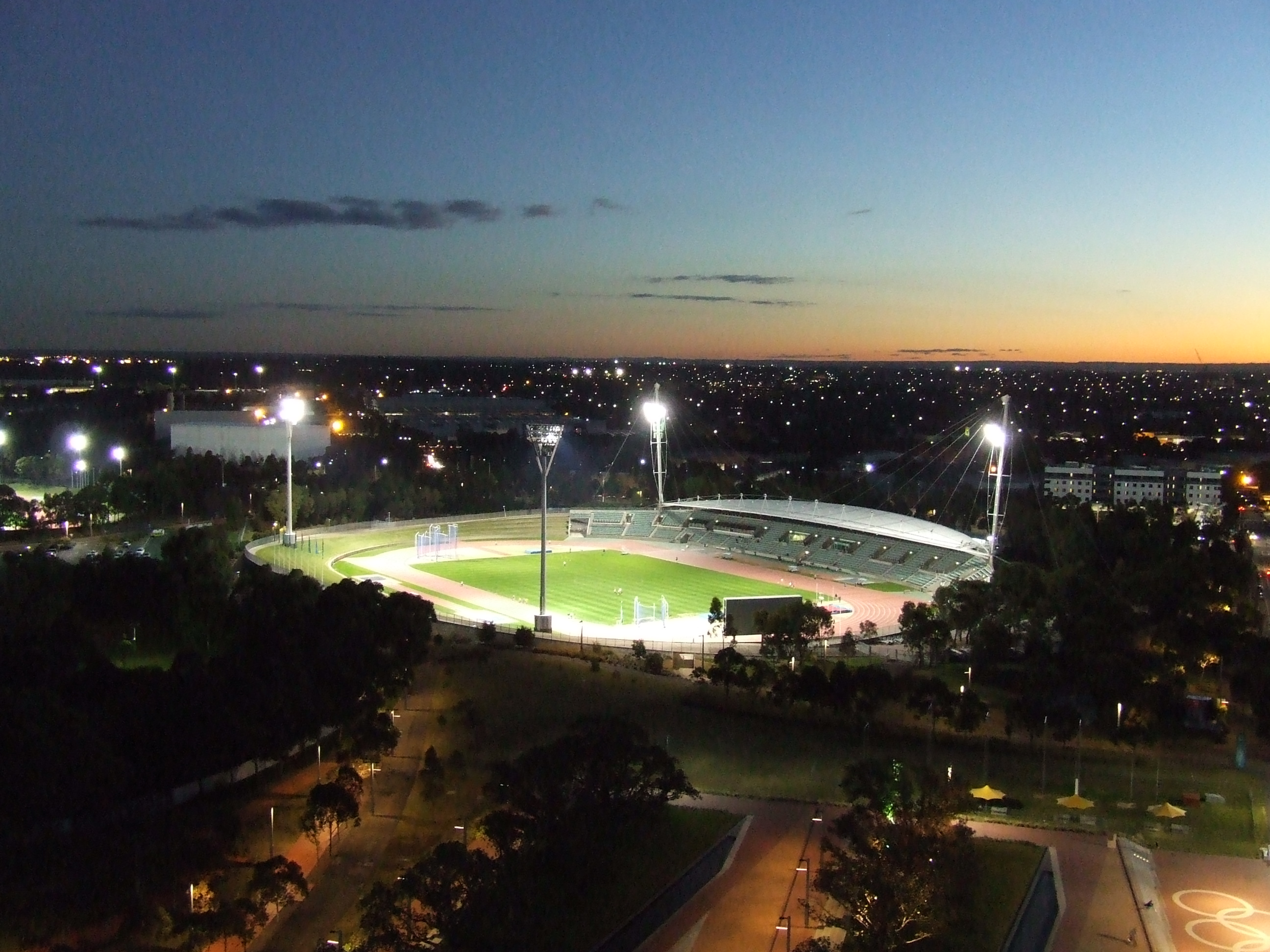

The 2012–13 Australian Athletics Championships was the 91st edition of the national championship in outdoor track and field for Australia. It was held from 11–14 April 2013 at the Sydney Olympic Park Athletic Centre in Sydney. It served as a selection meeting for Australia at the 2013 World Championships in Athletics. The 10,000 metres event took place separately at the Zatopek 10K on 8 December 2012 at Lakeside Stadium in Melbourne.

== Medal summary ==
=== Men ===
Event	Gold		Silver		Bronze	
100 metres (Wind: -1.3 m/s)	Josh Ross; Victoria	10.34	Tim Leathart; New South Wales	10.40	Joseph Millar; New Zealand (NZL)	10.42
200 metres (Wind: +1.5 m/s)	Josh Ross; Victoria	20.57	Nicholas Hough; New South Wales	20.66	Nicholas Boylett; Queensland	20.67
400 metres	Alex Beck; Queensland	46.18	Andrew Whyte; New Zealand (NZL)	46.25	Ben Offereins; Western Australia	46.33
800 metres	Alexander Rowe; Victoria	1:50.25	Jeff Riseley; Victoria	1:50.51	Jared West; New South Wales	1:50.83
1500 metres	James Kaan; New South Wales	3:46.29	Jeremy Roff; New South Wales	3:46.99	Joshua Wright; New South Wales	3:47.03
5000 metres	Cameron Page; New South Wales	13:29.45	Ben St Lawrence; New South Wales	13:30.37	Harry Summers; New South Wales	13:57.04
10,000 metres	Emmanuel Bett; Kenya (KEN)	27:59.23	Ben St Lawrence; New South Wales	28:35.92	Ben Moreau; Great Britain (GBR)	28:40.83
110 metres hurdles (Wind: +2.2 m/s)	Siddhanth Thingalaya; Queensland	13.72	Justin Merlino; New South Wales	13.76	Rayzam Shah Wan Sofian; Malaysia (MAS)	13.99
400 metres hurdles	Tristan Thomas; Tasmania	49.68	Ian Dewhurst; New South Wales	49.93	Daniel O'Shea; New Zealand (NZL)	50.16
3000 metres steeplechase	James Nipperess; New South Wales	8:49.39	Jack Colreavy; New South Wales	8:59.70	Chris Discombe; Victoria	9:04.84
High jump	Brandon Starc; New South Wales	2.28 m	Liam Zamel-Paez; Queensland	2.25 m	Hiromi Takahari; Japan (JPN)	2.22 m
Pole vault	Joel Pocklington; Victoria	5.20 m	Maxim Mishchenko; Victoria	5.10 m	Nick Southgate; New Zealand (NZL)	5.10 m
Long jump	Fabrice Lapierre; New South Wales	8.00 m (0.0 m/s)	Kurt Jenner; New South Wales	7.38 m (+0.7 m/s)	Tim McGuire; South Australia	7.32 m (+1.5 m/s)
Triple jump	Alwyn Jones; Victoria	16.37 m (0.3 m/s)	Tetteh Anang; Queensland	15.50 m (0.0 m/s)	Phillip Wyatt; New Zealand (NZL)	15.42 m (0.0 m/s)
Shot put	Damien Birkinhead; Victoria	19.27 m	Matthew Cowie; Western Australia	17.11 m	Adi Alifuddin Hussin; Malaysia (MAS)	16.48 m
Discus throw	Julian Wruck; Queensland	66.32 m	Matthew Denny; Queensland	56.91 m	Robert Melin; Victoria	55.58 m
Hammer throw	Tim Driesen; Victoria	69.68 m	Huw Peacock; Tasmania	64.13 m	Matthew Denny; Queensland	62.50 m
Javelin throw	Jarrod Bannister; Queensland	79.62 m	Hamish Peacock; Tasmania	77.01 m	Matthew Outzen; New South Wales	76.36 m
Decathlon	Scott McLaren; New Zealand (NZL)	7650 pts	Roger Skedd; Great Britain (GBR)	7457 pts	Kyle McCarthy; Queensland	7391 pts

=== Women ===
Event	Gold		Silver		Bronze	
100 metres (Wind: +1.1 m/s)	Toea Wisil; Queensland	11.49	Ashleigh Whittaker; Victoria	11.53	Margaret Gayen; South Australia	11.82
200 metres (Wind: 0.0 m/s)	Monica Brennan; Victoria	23.41	Toea Wisil; Queensland	23.70	Kendra Hubbard; Victoria	23.81
400 metres	Caitlin Sargent; Queensland	52.66	Anneliese Rubie; New South Wales	52.80	Monique Williams; New Zealand (NZL)	53.23
800 metres	Kelly Hetherington; Victoria	2:01.22	Angela Smit; New Zealand (NZL)	2:02.09	Georgia Wassall; New South Wales	2:03.37
1500 metres	Zoe Buckman; Victoria	4:09.79	Eliza Curnow; Victoria	4:11.79	Kaila McKnight; Victoria	4:14.04
5000 metres	Kaila McKnight; Victoria	15:53.91	Jessica Trengove; South Australia	15:58.33	Emma Rilen; New South Wales	16:36.40
100 metres hurdles (Wind: -1.0 m/s)	Shannon McCann; Western Australia	13.41	Brianna Beahan; Western Australia	13.53	Louise Wood; Great Britain (GBR)	13.83
400 metres hurdles	Lauren Boden; Australian Capital Territory	56.47	Jess Gulli; Victoria	57.68	Sara Klein; New South Wales	59.89
3000 metres steeplechase	Genevieve Lacaze; Queensland	10:01.20	Kate Spencer; New South Wales	10:20.72	Sarah McSweeney; Victoria	10:38.00
High jump	Miyuki Fukumoto; Japan (JPN)	1.92 m	Eleanor Patterson; Victoria	1.85 m	Sarah Cowley; New Zealand (NZL)	1.85 m
Pole vault	Alana Boyd; Queensland	4.30 m	Liz Parnov; Western Australia	4.20 m	Nina Kennedy; Western Australia	4.00 m
Long jump	Kerrie Perkins; Australian Capital Territory	6.43 m (0.0 m/s)	Brooke Stratton; Victoria	6.40 m (0.0 m/s)	Jessica Penney; Australian Capital Territory	6.19 m (0.0 m/s)
Triple jump	Linda Leverton; Queensland	13.68 m (-0.4 m/s)	Ellen Pettitt; Victoria	13.41 m (+0.7 m/s)	Mei Yamane; Japan (JPN)	12.91 m (+0.2 m/s)
Shot put	Te Rina Keenan; New Zealand (NZL)	15.75 m	Yukiko Shirai; Japan (JPN)	15.17 m	Kim Mulhall; Victoria	14.99 m
Discus throw	Te Rina Keenan; New Zealand (NZL)	55.97 m	Alix Kennedy; New South Wales	55.76 m	Siositina Hakeai; New Zealand (NZL)	55.06 m
Hammer throw	Lara Nielsen; Queensland	58.25 m	Danielle McConnell; Tasmania	57.00 m	Natalie Debeljuh; Victoria	56.30 m
Javelin throw	Kim Mickle; Western Australia	62.26 m	Kelsey-Lee Roberts; Australian Capital Territory	58.58 m	Karen Clarke; New South Wales	48.55 m
Heptathlon	Portia Bing; New Zealand (NZL)	5591 pts	Ashleigh Hamilton; Victoria	5369 pts	Theodora Spathis; Victoria	5240 pts
