= Mozambique at the 2007 All-Africa Games =

- Flag of Mozambique
- IOC code: MOZ
- NOC: Comité Olímpico Nacional de Moçambique

in Algiers, Algeria 11 July 2007 – 23 July 2007
- Medals: Gold 1 Silver 0 Bronze 0 Total 1

All-Africa Games appearances
- 1987; 1991; 1995; 1999; 2003; 2007; 2011; 2015; 2019; 2023

Mozambique competed at the 2007 All-Africa Games held in Algiers, Algeria. The country won one gold medal.

== Medal summary ==
=== Medal table ===
Medal	Name	Sport	Event	Date
Gold	Leonor Piuza	Athletics	Women's 800 metres	19 July

== Athletics ==
Mozambique won one gold medal in athletics. Leonor Piuza won the gold medal in the women's 800 metres event.

== Basketball ==
Mozambique competed in the women's tournament.

== Judo ==
Edson Madeira competed in the men's 66 kg event.
