= Athletics at the 2007 All-Africa Games – Women's 800 metres =

The women's 800 metres at the 2007 All-Africa Games were held on July 18–19.

== Medalists ==
| Gold | Silver | Bronze |
|---|---|---|
| Leonor Piuza; Mozambique | Agnes Samaria; Namibia | Nahida Touhami; Algeria |

== Results ==
=== Heats ===
Qualification: First 2 of each heat (Q) and the next 2 fastest (q) qualified for the final.

| Rank | Heat | Name | Nationality | Time | Notes |
|---|---|---|---|---|---|
| 1 | 3 | Agnes Samaria | Namibia | 2:04.80 | Q |
| 2 | 3 | Leonor Piuza | Mozambique | 2:04.97 | Q |
| 3 | 1 | Lebogang Phalula | South Africa | 2:05.58 | Q |
| 4 | 1 | Charity Wandia | Kenya | 2:05.89 | Q |
| 5 | 3 | Caroline Chepkwony | Kenya | 2:06.43 | q |
| 6 | 2 | Nahida Touhami | Algeria | 2:07.52 | Q |
| 7 | 2 | Fatimoh Muhammed | Liberia | 2:07.69 | Q |
| 8 | 1 | Elizet Banda | Zambia | 2:07.80 | q |
| 9 | 1 | Eliane Saholinirina | Madagascar | 2:08.03 | |
| 10 | 2 | Josephine Nyarunda | Kenya | 2:08.15 | |
| 11 | 3 | Aman Beshanork | Ethiopia | 2:08.27 | |
| 12 | 1 | Lilian Silva | Angola | 2:09.23 | |
| 13 | 1 | Seynabou Paye | Senegal | 2:09.98 | |
| 14 | 2 | Sandrine Thiebaud | Togo | 2:10.57 | |
| 15 | 3 | Kokob Berhe | Eritrea | 2:12.29 | |
| 16 | 2 | Noelie Yarigo | Benin | 2:13.29 | |
| 17 | 2 | Jeanne d'Arc Uwamahoro | Rwanda | 2:16.20 | |
| 18 | 3 | Dina Lebo Phalula | South Africa | 2:16.49 | |
| 19 | 2 | Emilia Mikue | Equatorial Guinea | 2:17.25 | NR |
| 20 | 3 | Jeannette Niyonsaba | Burundi | 2:18.29 | |
| | 1 | Cynthia Bee | Liberia | DNF | |
| | 1 | Nazret Gebrehiwet | Eritrea | DNF | |
| | 3 | Marlyse Nsourou | Gabon | DNF | |
| | 1 | Nouria Benida Merrah | Algeria | DNS | |
| | 2 | Mestawot Tadesse | Ethiopia | DNS | |

=== Final ===
| Rank | Name | Nationality | Time | Notes |
|---|---|---|---|---|
| 1st place, gold medalist(s) | Leonor Piuza | Mozambique | 2:02.83 | |
| 2nd place, silver medalist(s) | Agnes Samaria | Namibia | 2:03.17 | |
| 3rd place, bronze medalist(s) | Nahida Touhami | Algeria | 2:03.79 | |
| 4 | Lebogang Phalula | South Africa | 2:06.27 | |
| 5 | Caroline Chepkwony | Kenya | 2:06.36 | |
| 6 | Charity Wandia | Kenya | 2:06.42 | |
| 7 | Elizet Banda | Zambia | 2:07.20 | |
| 8 | Fatimmoh Muhammed | Liberia | 2:07.43 | |
