= Jarrod Geddes =

Australian sprinter

Personal information
- Nationality: Australian
- Born: 24 February 1994

Sport
- Country: Australia
- Sport: Athletics
- Event: 100 M

Achievements and titles
- Personal best: 100 M: 10.30 (2014)

Jarrod Geddes (born 24 February 1994) is an Australian track and field athlete specialising in the 100 metres who has competed in the World Championships.

== Records and rankings ==
Geddes is a one-time bronze medalist in the 100 metres in the Australian National Track & Field Championships. He is also a one-time gold medalist, also in the 100 metres, in the Australian National Junior Track & Field Championships. Geddes's current Australian all-time rankings are listed below.

Event	Ranking
100 M	38th

== Competitions ==
=== Youth World Championships ===
Geddes competed at the 2011 World Youth Championships in Athletics in Lille, France. He was selected and competed in the 100 metres. Geddes competed in heat two and finished 1st in a time of 10.66. This performance qualified him for the semi-final where he competed in semi-final two. In the semi-final Geddes, again, finished 1st in a time of 10.76. He drew lane three in the final and finished 6th.

=== Senior World Championships ===
Geddes was selected for the World Championships in the 4 x 100 metres relay along with Tim Leathart, Joshua Ross and Andrew McCabe. The team competed in heat 3 but did not finish.

=== World Relay Championships ===
Geddes competed in the 2014 World Relay Championships. He was selected in the 4 x 100 metres relay with Joel Bee, Jin Su Jung, Tom Gamble, Jake Hammond and Alexander Hartmann. Geddes, Hartmann, Su Jung and Hammond were chosen as the four to compete in the actual event. They finished 6th in heat one in a time of 39.21. This didn't qualify them for the final but they competed in final B, where they did not finish.

== Statistics ==
=== Personal bests ===
Event	Performance	Venue	Date
60 M	6.89	Wollongong, Australia	30 October 2010
100 M	10.28	Oordegem, Belgium	22 February 2014
200 M	20.59	Perth, Australia	22 February 2014
Long Jump	6.91	Sydney, Australia	16 October 2011

== Achievements ==
Year	Competition	Venue	Position	Event	Notes
Representing Australia
2011	World Youth Championships	Lille, France	6th	100 metres	10.63
2013	World Championships	Moscow, Russia	DNF	4 x 100 metres	With Tim Leathart, Joshua Ross and Andrew McCabe
2014	World Relay Championships	Bydgoszcz, Poland	DNF	4 x 100 metres	With Alexander Hartmann, Jin Su Jung and Jake Hammond
