= Delilah DiCrescenzo =

American runner (born 1983)

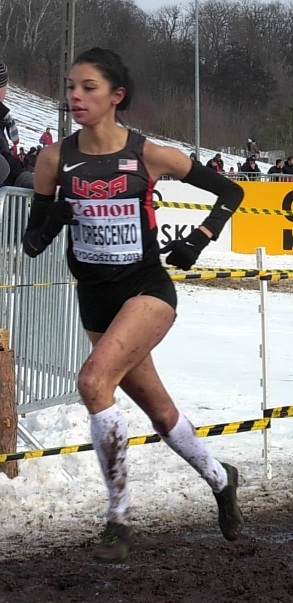
- Delilah DiCrescenzo at the 2013 IAAF World Cross Country Championships

Personal information
- Born: February 9, 1983 (age 43) Chicago, Illinois, U.S.
- Height: 5 ft 6 in (168 cm)
- Weight: 105 lb (48 kg)

Sport
- Sport: Track, Long-distance running
- Events: 1500 meters, 3000 meters, 5000 meters, Marathon
- College team: Columbia
- Club: NYAC
- Turned pro: 2003
- Coached by: Frank Gagliano (NJ-NY TC)

Achievements and titles
- Personal bests: 800 meters: 2:08.01; 1500 meters: 4:11.70; Mile: 4:32.11; 3000 meters: 8:52.43; 5000 meters: 15:36.45; Marathon: 2:53:40

Delilah DiCrescenzo (/ˌdɪkrəˈʃɛnzoʊ/; born February 9, 1983) is an American distance runner. She competes in the women's 3000 metres steeplechase. She is a 2001 graduate of Queen of Peace High School in Burbank, Illinois and a 2005 graduate of Columbia University, where she majored in sociology. In May 2011, DiCrescenzo received her master's degree in Sports Management, also from Columbia University. She then competed for the New York Athletic Club and trained with the NJ-NY Track Club under the guidance of Coach Frank Gagliano. As of 2013 she was sponsored by Puma and continued to compete on a worldwide level.

She is also well known as the subject of the Plain White T's platinum hit "Hey There Delilah".

== Running career ==
She finished 3rd in the steeple chase at the 2006 US Nationals, and won the 6K title at the USATF National Club Cross Country Championships in the fall of 2007. She competed at the 2008 U.S. Olympic trials where she made the finals, but did not qualify for the Olympic team.

She fared better in cross country running the following year: at the USA Cross Country Championships she finished in fourth place, and qualified to compete at the 2009 IAAF World Cross Country Championships, finishing in 33rd (which was the second-best performance by a North American athlete after Julie Culley). She headed Team USA to the gold with a win at the Americas Cross Country Championships – she won the NACAC-endorsed competition over a 6 km course at the Mt. Irvine Resort in Tobago, beating several other Americans who had previously beaten her in qualifying at the USA Cross Country National Championships.

DiCrescenzo qualified for the 2011 IAAF World Track and Field Championships in the 3000m steeplechase by finishing third at the US Championships in a time of 9:46.31. However, she did not compete due to injury.

DiCrescenzo failed to qualify for the 2012 London Olympics, finishing 13th at the USA 10 km Championships (33:36) and 7th in steeplechase at the US Olympic Trials (9:46.30).

On February 2, 2013, she again qualified for the 2013 IAAF World Cross Country Championship with a 6th place finish in a time of 26:57.2 at the USA Cross Country Championships in St. Louis, Missouri. At the world championships, she finished 47th.

On May 7, 2017, DiCrescenzo won the women's division of Southwest Half Marathon held in Palos Heights, Illinois, with a time of 1:21:31, which was nearly seven minutes ahead of the second-place finisher.

== "Hey There Delilah" ==
She is the subject of the Plain White T's 2006 song "Hey There Delilah", which reached number 1 on the Billboard Hot 100 in 2007. She had met Plain White T's singer Tom Higgenson through a mutual friend. Higgenson was inspired to write the song after meeting her. Though the two were never in a relationship, DiCrescenzo did attend the 50th Grammy Awards in February 2008 as the guest of Higgenson, where her namesake song was nominated for 2008 Song of the Year.
