= List of Women's Track & Field/Cross Country Academic All-America Team Members of the Year =

Student athlete award

Women's Track & Field/Cross Country Academic All-America Team Members of the Year
- Awarded for: The yearly outstanding track & field/cross country Academic All-America team member
- Country: United States & Canada
- Presented by: College Sports Communicators

History
- First award: 2002
- Most recent: Doris Lemngole, Alabama, Blessing Akintoye, West Texas A&M, Charlotte Frere, Augustana (IL), Jaynie Halterman, Taylor
- Next ceremony: July 2027

The Women's Track & Field/Cross Country Academic All-America Team Member of the Year is the annual most outstanding singular athletics competitor of the set of female athletes selected for the Academic All-America Teams in a given year.

== Two-division era (2002–2011) ==
Two-time Winners

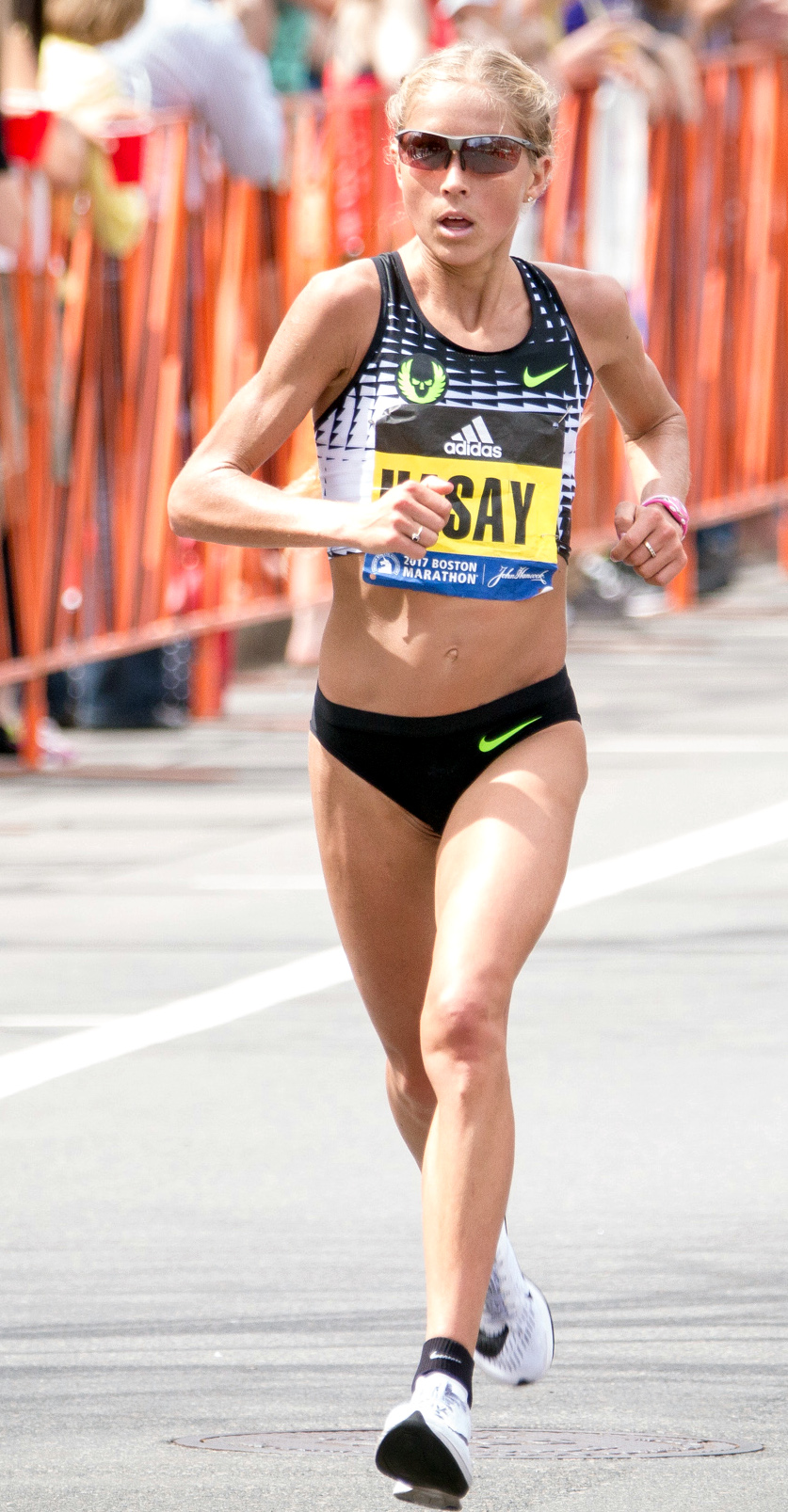
Jordan Hasay (pictured in 2017), 2011 and 2013 winner

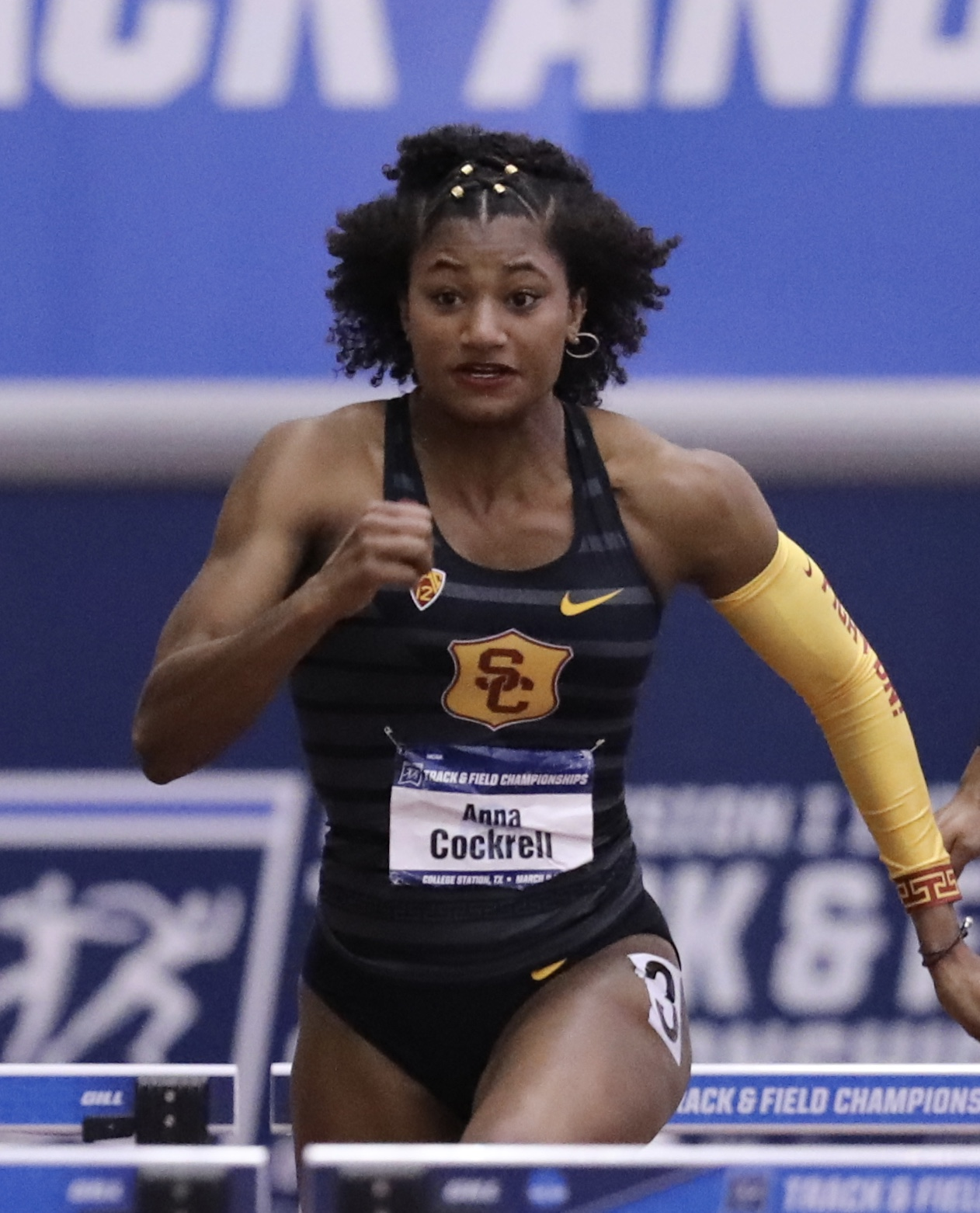
Anna Cockrell (pictured in 2018), 2020 and 2021 winner

Other Winners

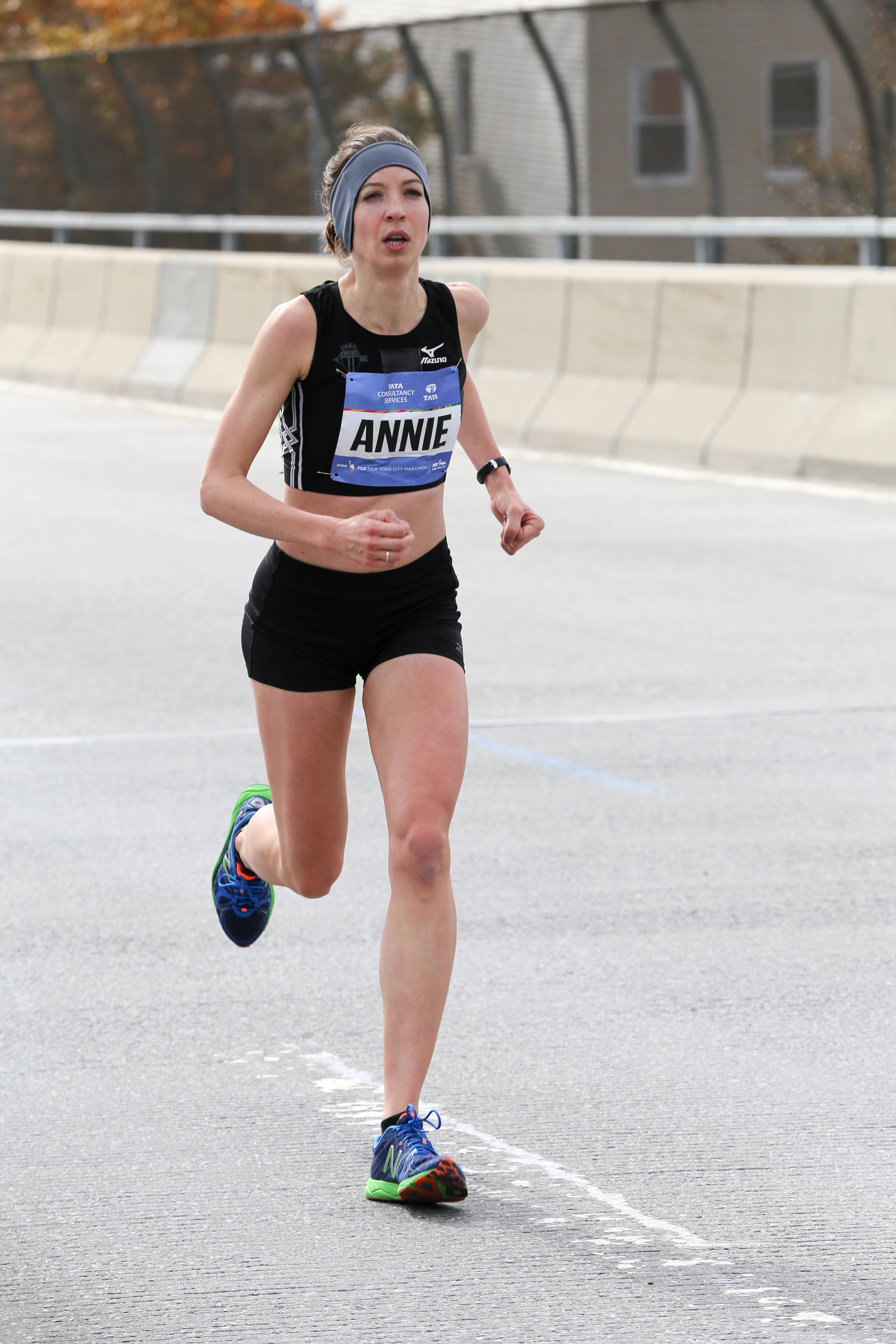
Annie Bersagel (pictured in 2014), 2006 winner

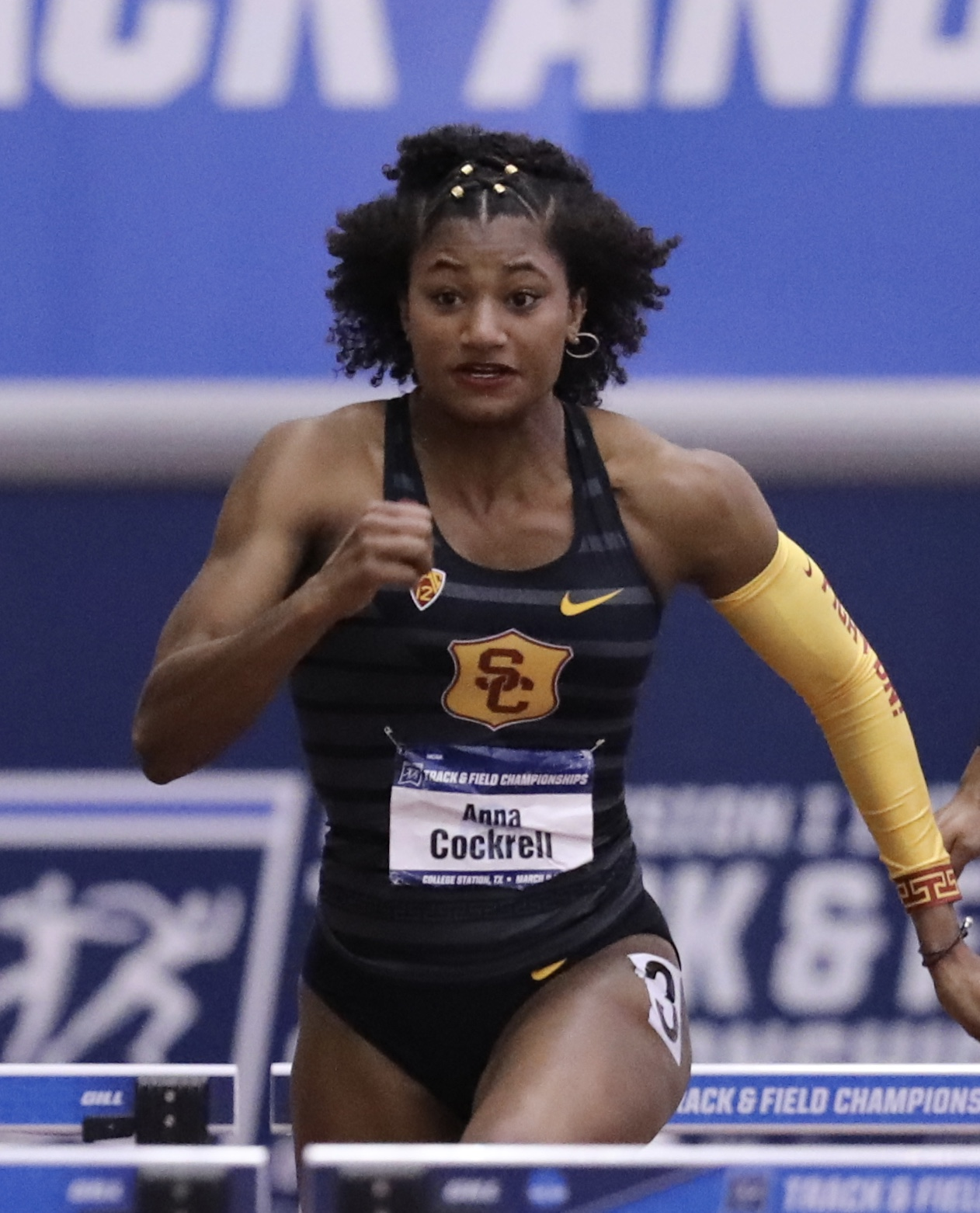
Lisa Uhl (pictured in 2010), 2009 winner

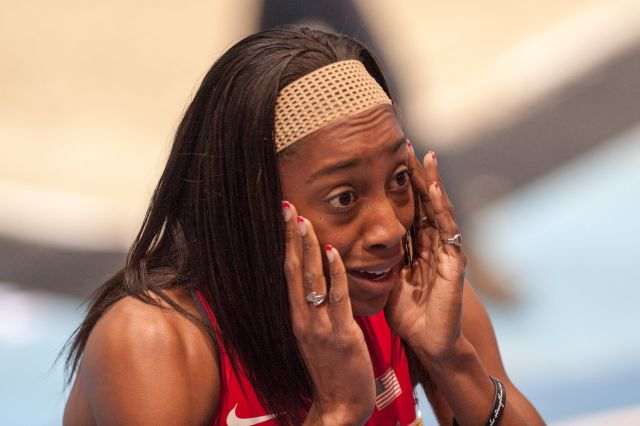
Chanelle Price (pictured in 2014), 2012 winner

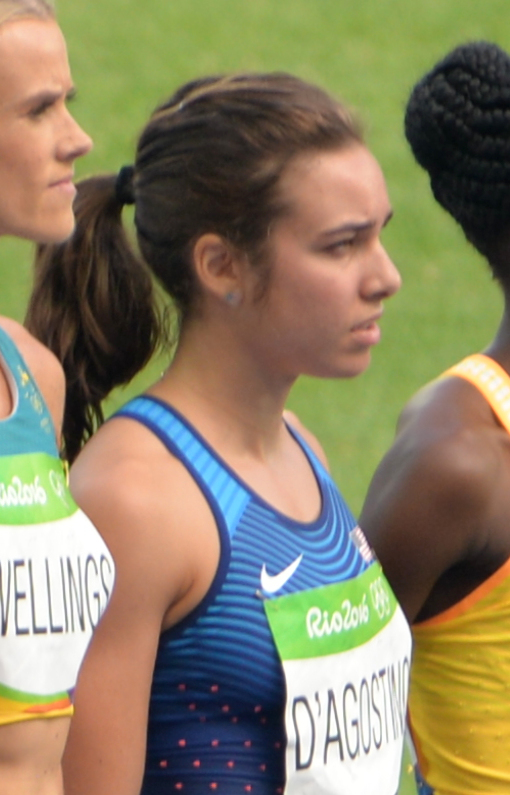
Abbey Cooper (pictured in 2016), 2014 winner

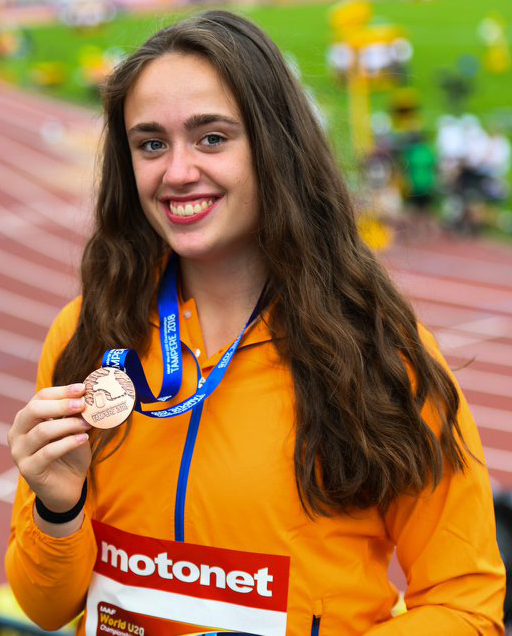
Jorinde van Klinken (pictured in 2018), 2022 winner

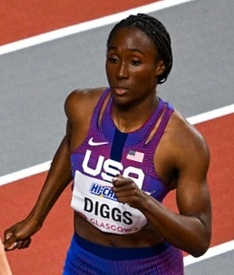
Talitha Diggs (pictured in 2024), 2023 winner

Key
†	Indicates winners of the all-sports Academic All-America award.

All winners are American unless indicated otherwise.

Women's Track & Field/Cross Country Academic All-America Team Members of the Year (2002–2011)
Year	University Division		College Division	
Year	Winner	School	Winner	School
2002	Andriena Byrd	Arkansas	Jill Theeler	North Dakota State
2003	Shani Marks	Minnesota	Kathy Darling	Johns Hopkins
2004	Lindsey Gallo	Michigan	Kristen Shields†	Whitworth
2005	Lindsey Gallo	Michigan	Kristin Anderson	Central Missouri
2006	Annie Bersagel	Wake Forest	Erin Powell	Nebraska Wesleyan
2007	Arianna Lambie	Stanford	Elaine Binkley	Denison
2008	April Kubishta	Arizona State	Rachel Anderson	Illinois Wesleyan
2009	Lisa Koll	Iowa State	Nora Kuiper	Hope
2010	Phoebe Wright	Tennessee	Jessica Pixler†	Seattle Pacific
2011	Jordan Hasay	Oregon	Shannon Gagne†	New Haven

=== Four-division era (2012–present) ===
Women's Track & Field/Cross Country Academic All-America Team Members of the Year (2012–present)
Year	Division I		Division II		Division III		College/NAIA (Note: College Division, 2011–19; NAIA, 2018–present)	
Year	Winner	School	Winner	School	Winner	School	Winner	School
2012	Chanelle Price	Tennessee	Betsy Graney	Grand Valley State	Elizabeth Phillips	Washington (MO)	(Fiji) Milika Tuivanuavou	Fresno Pacific
2013	Jordan Hasay	Oregon	Kristen Hixson	Grand Valley State	Mary Mahoney	Mount Union	Breanna Mathes	Morningside
2014	Abbey D’Agostino	Dartmouth	Kristen Hixson	Grand Valley State	Christy Cazzola†	Wisconsin–Oshkosh	Hannah Helker	Oklahoma Baptist
2015	Rebecca Esselstein	Air Force	Ewa Zaborowska	Harding	Lucy Cheadle	Washington (MO)	Ellie Staker	Embry–Riddle
2016	Christina Hillman	Iowa State	Emily Oren	Hillsdale	Maryann Gong†	MIT	Leah Esposito†	Carroll
2017	Erin Finn	Michigan	Natalie O’Keefe	Southwest Baptist	Maryann Gong†	MIT	Leah Esposito†	Carroll
2018	Lynne Mooradian	Army	(Poland) Alicja Konieczek†	Western Colorado	Taryn Cordani	Ithaca	Samantha Liermann	Concordia (NE)
2019	Lexi Jacobus†	Arkansas	(Poland) Alicja Konieczek	Western Colorado	Elizabeth Jones	Nebraska Wesleyan	Samantha Liermann	Concordia (NE)
2020	Anna Cockrell	USC	Haven Lander	Pittsburg State	Katie Bacher	MIT	Danielle De Castro	Oregon Tech
2021	Anna Cockrell	USC	(Norway) Ida Narbuvoll	Mary	Katie Bacher	MIT	(United Kingdom) Emily Kearney	Midland
2022	Jorinde van Klinken	Arizona State	Zoe Baker	Colorado Mines	Esther Seeland†	Messiah	Josie Puelz	Concordia (NE)
2023	Talitha Diggs	Florida	Zoe Baker	Colorado Mines	Kenadee Wayt†	Mount Union	Rachel Battershell	Concordia (NE)
2024	(Jamaica) Lamara Distin	Texas A&M	Zoe Baker	Colorado Mines	(Saudi Arabia) Fiona Smith	Saint Benedict	Ellyse Tingelstad	College of Idaho
2025	(Kenya) Doris Lemngole	Alabama	Brynn King	Roberts Wesleyan	(Netherlands) Nikki Boon	Emory	(Ukraine) Alina Boshchuk	Cumberlands
2026	(Kenya) Doris Lemngole	Alabama	(Nigeria) Blessing Akintoye	West Texas A&M	Charlotte Frere	Augustana (IL)	Jaynie Halterman	Taylor
