= Tim Leathart =

Australian sprinter

Personal information
- Full name: Timothy Leathart
- Born: 22 September 1989 (age 36) Darlinghurst, New South Wales
- Height: 6 ft 1 in (185 cm)
- Weight: 176 lb (80 kg)

Sport
- Country: Australia
- Sport: Athletics
- Event(s): 100 M 4 × 100 meters relay
- Coached by: John Patchett

Achievements and titles
- National finals: 2012 Athletics Championships: Men's 100 m – Silver; 2013 Athletics Championships: Men's 100 m – Silver; 2014 Athletics Championships: Men's 100 m – Gold
- Personal best: 100 M: 10.24 (2013)

Tim Leathart (born 22 September 1989) is an Australian track and field athlete specialising in the 100 meters who has competed in the World Championships.

== Records and rankings ==
Leathart is a one-time gold medalist and two-time silver medalist in the 100 meters in the Australian National Track & Field Championships. Leathart's current Australian all-time rankings are listed below.

Event	Ranking
100 M	14th
200 M	34th

== Competitions ==
=== Olympic Games ===
Leathart was selected in the five-member team for the 4 × 100 meters at the 2012 Summer Olympics in London, United Kingdom. However, he was not one of the four athletes to run in the actual race.

=== Senior World Championships ===
Leathart was selected for the World Championships in the 4 × 100 meters relay along with Jarrod Geddes, Joshua Ross and Andrew McCabe. The team competed in heat three, but did not finish.

== Statistics ==
=== Personal bests ===
Event	Performance	Venue	Date
60 M	6.85	Sydney	13 February 2016
100 M	10.24	Sydney	9 March 2013
200 M	20.71	Sydney	9 March 2013

== Achievements ==
Year	Competition	Venue	Position	Event	Notes
Representing Australia
2013	World Championships	Moscow, Russia	DNF	4 × 100 meters	With Jarrod Geddes, Joshua Ross and Andrew McCabe (sprinter)Andrew McCabe
