= City2Surf (Sydney) =

Annual 14km road running event in Sydney, Australia

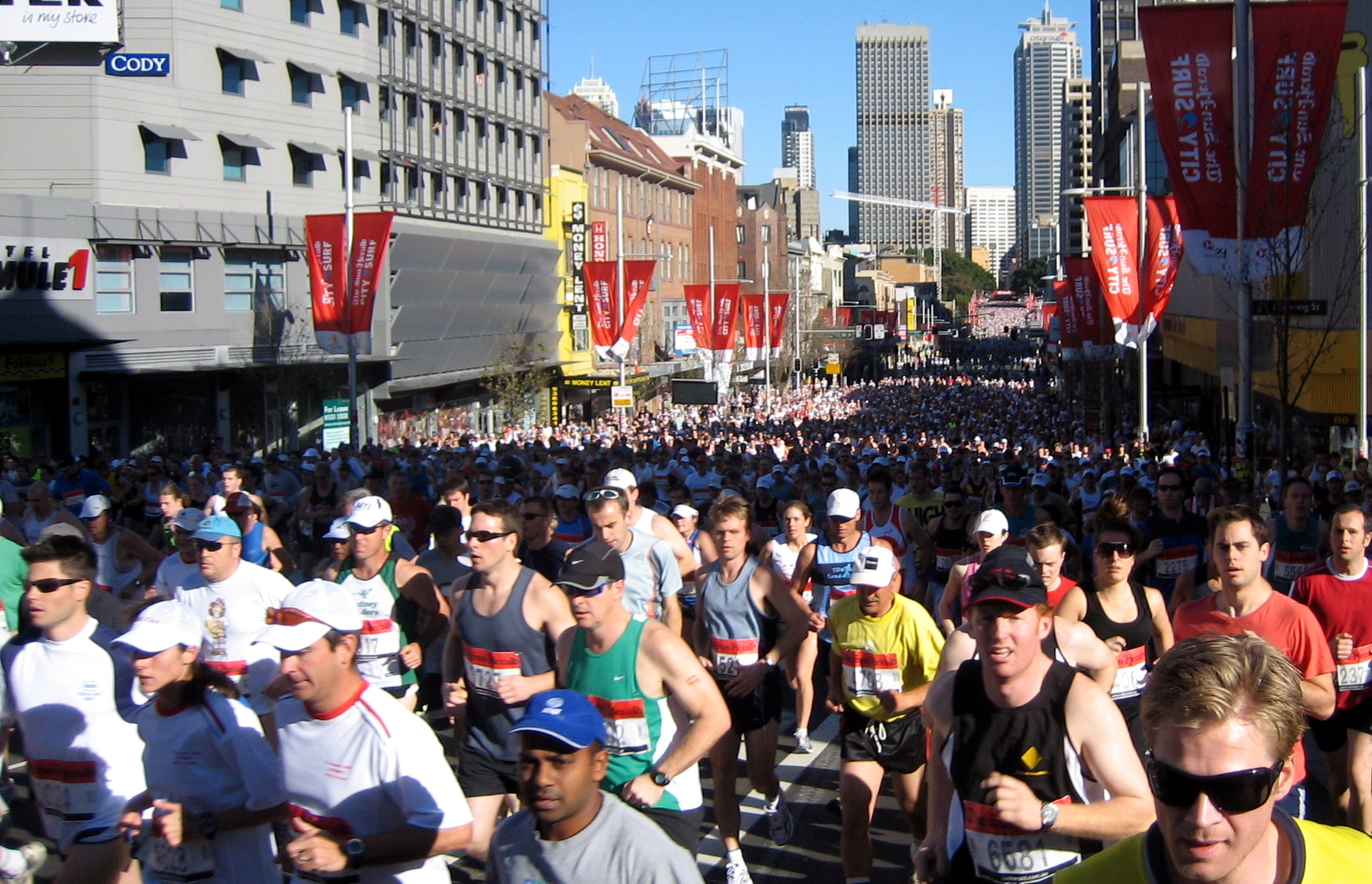
- Competitors in the 2007 event run through Kings Cross
- Date: Annual event. Most recently Sunday, 10 August 2025
- Location: Sydney CBD to Bondi Beach
- Event type: Road race and fun run
- Distance: 13.907 kilometres (8.641 mi)
- Established: 5 September 1971; 55 years ago
- Course records: Men: 40:02.46 (1991) by Steve Moneghetti; Women: 45:08 (2001) by Susie Power
- Website: city2surf.com.au
- Participants: ca. 80,000

City2Surf (or City to Surf) is a popular road running event held annually in Sydney covering a 14-kilometre (8.7 mi) course. The event is a "fun run" as well as a race, attracting both competitive runners and community participants who can choose to run or to walk. The event attracts more than 80,000 entrants who start in staggered groups based on previous running times and early entry.

== History ==
The City2Surf has been held as an annual event since the first run on 5 September 1971, initially as a 9.4-mile-long (15.1 km) run that commenced in George Street, adjacent to Sydney Town Hall. It was conceived by the staff of The Sun newspaper and was inspired by the Bay to Breakers event in San Francisco. The first event was jointly organised by the Amateur Athletic Association of NSW and the NSW Women's Amateur Athletic Association and attracted 1,576 starters, 1,509 of whom completed the event within the 100 minutes time limit. Many of the entrants were registered athletes belonging to the Registered Athletic Clubs that were part of these two bodies. To date, 24 of those entrants, now known as the City2Surf Legends, have run in every City2Surf.

Since 1973 it has been held on the second Sunday in August, except for the race held in 2000, moved to July due to the Sydney Olympics in August.

When The Sun ceased publication in 1988, the sponsorship of the event passed to the new Sunday tabloid The Sun-Herald. Voltaren, an Australian brand of the anti-inflammatory drug diclofenac, took over sponsorship in 2025.

In 2010, on the event's 40th anniversary, a record 80,000 participants ran, making it the largest run of its kind in the world. That level of participation has continued.

The course record is 40:03, set by Steve Moneghetti in 1991. The women's record is 45:08 minutes, set by Susie Power in 2001. Non-Australian athletes typically won the race from 1995 to 2007, including repeat winners Laban Chege (1999–2000), Patrick Nyangelo Lusato (2003–2005), and Dickson Marwa (2006–2007). In 2008, Martin Dent became the first Australian winner since Lee Troop in 1997. Marwa was competing in the 2008 Olympics.

Since 2010 the course has started in several groups to give preference to faster runners. The first group to start are elite wheelchair athletes, followed by invitation-only seeded and preferred runner groups, followed by runners with previous race times under 70 minutes, runners with previous race times under 90 minutes, an open entry running group, an open entry jogging group, and finally an open entry "Back of the Pack" group for walking, using a wheelchair or pushing child strollers. Entry to all groups is limited to a certain number of competitors and, except for the invitation-only groups, allocated on a first-come first-served basis.

Due to the COVID-19 pandemic the 2020 event, the 50th anniversary, was pushed back from 9 August until 18 October and the live event cancelled for the first time in its history. Instead, the event was run as a virtual event where participants were requested to run the length of the course on local streets using the City2Surf Virtual Run app. In 2021, Sydney had been in another lockdown since June, the physical race was cancelled again and another virtual event scheduled for October.

14 August 2022 saw the return of the live running of the event for the first time since 2019.

== Route ==
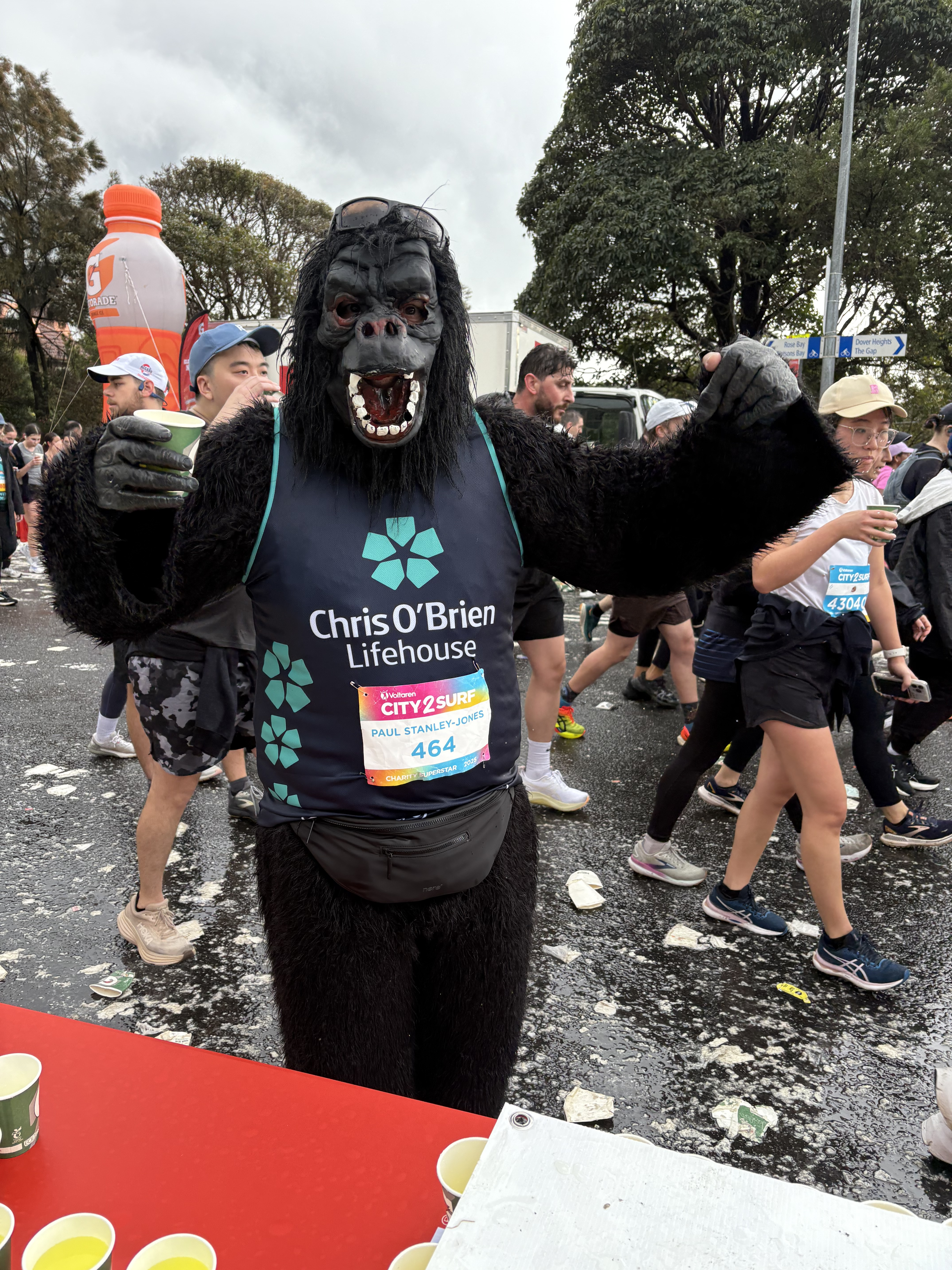
A runner at the 2025 City2Surf in a Gorilla suit

The route taken by the participants commences in the city centre of Sydney and passes through the suburbs of East Sydney, Kings Cross, Rushcutters Bay, Double Bay, Rose Bay, Vaucluse, Dover Heights and Bondi Beach. The most difficult part of the course is "Heartbreak Hill" at the halfway mark, a 2-kilometre-long (1.2 mi) steep ascent from Rose Bay to Vaucluse along New South Head Road.

Features en route include many amateur bands performing along the suburban roads, and many City2Surf participants dressed in novelty themed costumes.

== Winners ==
Year	Male winner	Country	Time	Female winner	Country	Time
2025	Isaac Heyne	Australia	40' 33"	Bronte Oates	Australia	45' 51"
2024	Isaac Heyne	Australia	40' 50"	Leanne Pompeani	Australia	45' 38"
2023	Ed Goddard	Australia	41' 30"	Niamh Allen	Australia	47' 29"
2022	Liam Adams	Australia	41' 14"	Leanne Pompeani	Australia	45' 49"
2019	Harry Summers	Australia	40' 05"	Tara Palm	Australia	47' 11"
2018	Ben St Lawrence	Australia	41' 42"	Ellie Pashley	Australia	46' 21"
2017	Harry Summers	Australia	42' 09"	Celia Sullohern	Australia	47' 03"
2016	Harry Summers	Australia	42' 00"	Cassandra Fien	Australia	47' 29"
2015	Brad Milosevic	Australia	42' 15"	Cassandra Fien	Australia	46' 39"
2014	Craig Mottram	Australia	41' 56"	Casey Wood	Australia	47' 59"
2013	Ben Moreau	England	41' 47"	Linda Spencer	Australia	48' 28"
2012	Liam Adams	Australia	41' 31"	Lara Tamsett	Australia	46' 55"
2011	Liam Adams	Australia	41' 11"	Jessica Trengove	Australia	47' 29"
2010	Ben St Lawrence	Australia	41' 05"	Lara Tamsett	Australia	46' 54"
2009	Michael Shelley	Australia	41' 02"	Melinda Vernon	Australia	47' 46"
2008	Martin Dent	Australia	41' 12"	Rebecca Lowe	Australia	47' 18"
2007	Dickson Marwa	Tanzania	41' 10"	Jessica Ruthe	New Zealand	46' 33"
2006	Dickson Marwa	Tanzania	40' 49"	Anna Thompson	Australia	47' 15"
2005	Patrick Nyangelo Lusato	Tanzania	41' 12"	Kerryn McCann	Australia	46' 27"
2004	Patrick Nyangelo Lusato	Tanzania	41' 04"	Hayley McGregor	Australia	46' 22"
2003	Patrick Nyangelo Lusato	Tanzania	41' 55"	Hayley McGregor	Australia	47' 28"
2002	Jussi Utriainen	Finland	41' 37"	Susie Power	Australia	45' 50"
2001	John Msuri	Tanzania	40' 24"	Susie Power	Australia	45' 08"
2000	Laban Chege	Kenya	40' 25"	Susan Hobson	Australia	48' 24"
1999	Laban Chege	Kenya	40' 27"	Kylie Risk	Australia	46' 25"
1998	Daniel Browne	United States	41' 35"	Kerryn McCann	Australia	48' 10"
1997	Lee Troop	Australia	40' 55"	Elizabeth Miller	Australia	47' 30"
1996	John Morapedi	South Africa	40' 19"	Heather Turland	Australia	46' 43"
1995	John Morapedi	South Africa	41' 05"	Elizabeth Wilson	United States	47' 05"
1994	Paul Arthur	Australia	42' 08"	Heather Turland	Australia	46' 59"
1993	Andrew Lloyd	Australia	40' 29"	Carolyn Schuwalow	Australia	47' 41"
1992	Julian Paynter	Australia	41' 28"	Krishna Stanton	Australia	48' 25"
1991	Steve Moneghetti	Australia	40' 03"	Lisa Ondieki	Australia	46' 41"
1990	Steve Moneghetti	Australia	40' 15"	Nancy Ditz	United States	47' 13"
1989	Steve Moneghetti	Australia	40' 34"	Tani Ruckle	Australia	49' 02"
1988	Steve Moneghetti	Australia	40' 16"	Lisa Martin	Australia	45' 47"
1987	Brad Camp	Australia	40' 15"	Robyn Root	United States	48' 05"
1986	Andrew Lloyd	Australia	41' 37"	Nancy Ditz	United States	47' 41"
1985	Hugh Jones	England	41' 48"	Nancy Ditz	United States	49' 30"
1984	Andrew Lloyd	Australia	41' 54"	Sharon Dalton	Australia	50' 08"
1983	Andrew Lloyd	Australia	42' 00"	Rhonda Malliner	Australia	49' 31"
1982	Steve Austin	Australia	41' 42"	Wendy Hancock	New Zealand	48' 48"
1981	Rob de Castella	Australia	40' 08"	Allison Roe	New Zealand	47' 36"
1980	Tim O'Shaughnessy	Australia	41' 50"	Lawrie Binder	United States	48' 16"
1979	Bill Scott	Australia	41' 54"	Lawrie Binder	United States	49' 40"
1978	Chris Wardlaw	Australia	42' 42"	Elizabeth Richards-Hassall	Australia	51' 52"
1977	Rob de Castella	Australia	41' 12"	Georgina Moore	Australia	50' 54"
1976	Tim O'Shaughnessy	Australia	42' 04"	Elizabeth Richards-Hassall	Australia	52' 44"
1975	Dennis Nee	Australia	43' 44"	Angela Cook	Australia	54' 58"
1974	John Farrington	Australia	43' 21"	Angela Cook	Australia	56' 02"
1973	John Farrington	Australia	43' 11"	Therese Bell-McKillop	Australia	56' 44"
1972	John Farrington	Australia	45' 15"	Elizabeth Stanford	Australia	60' 41"
1971	Ken Moore	United States	44' 28"	Elizabeth Stanford	Australia	58' 20"

== Notable events ==
Deaths during the race have occurred several times. In years 2000, 2008 and 2014, a competitor died of a heart attack close to the finish line of the race. After the 2008 death, medical academic Michael O'Rourke noted that a runner developing arrhythmia and cardiac arrest happens most years but that the sufferer is usually revived.

The 2016 event was featured in the first season on Ambulance Australia in 2018. 300 participants required medical attention, a majority of which needing help after they finished the race. Recent studies have tried to predict injury and/or other health issues based on geographic location on the course and meteorological conditions.

== See also ==
- Real Insurance Sydney Harbour 10k
- City to Surf (Perth)
