= Caroline Chepkwony =

Kenyan long-distance runner (born 1985)

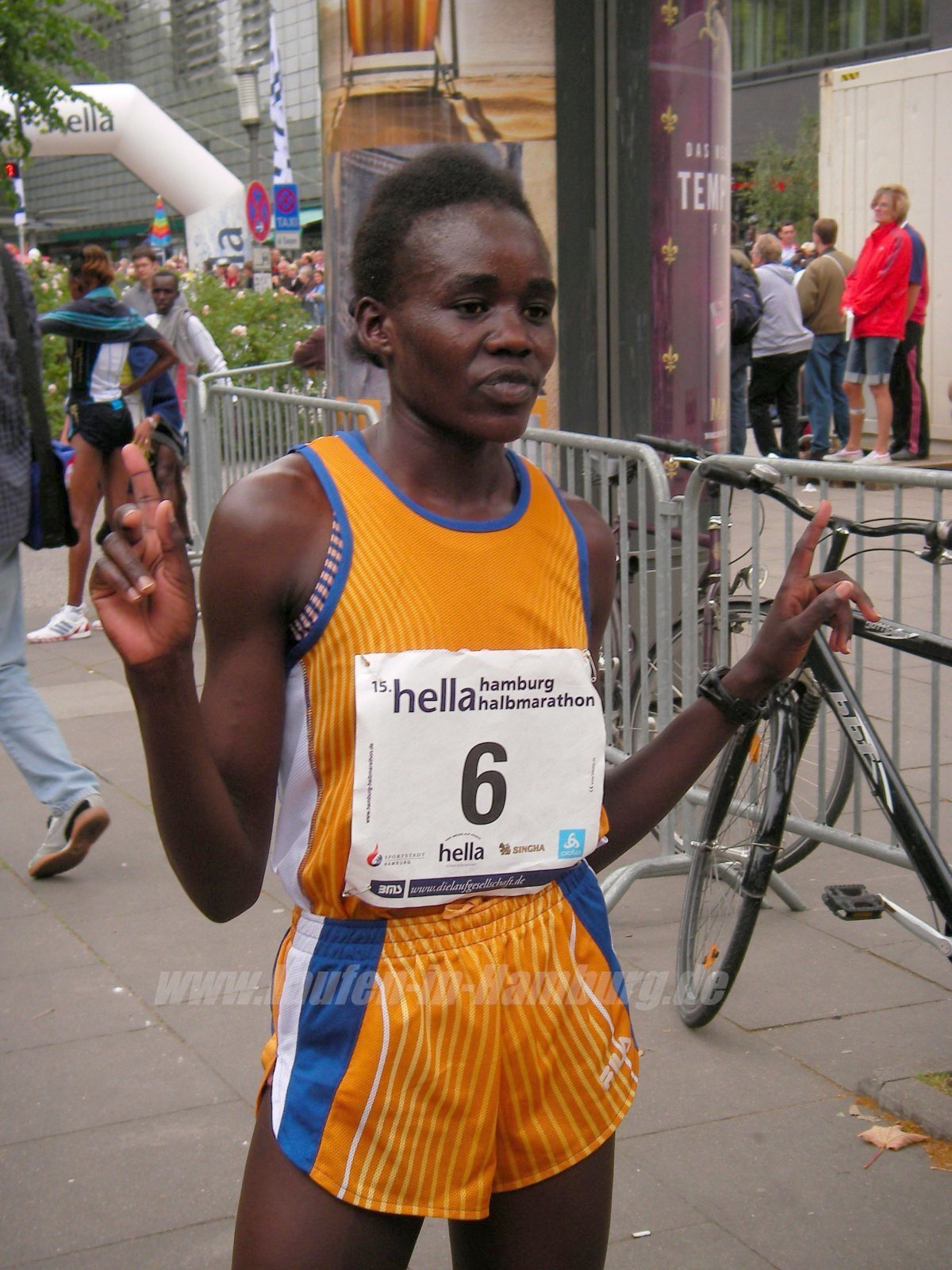
- Chepkwony after winning the 2009 Hamburg Half Marathon

Medal record

Women's athletics

Representing Kenya

African Championships
Bronze medal – third place	2004 Brazzaville	800 metres

Caroline Jepchirchir Chepkwony (born 27 April 1985)^{nb} is a Kenyan long-distance runner who competes in road running competitions.

She started her career as a track runner and she was the runner-up at the African Junior Athletics Championships in 2001 and won the 800 metres bronze medal at the 2004 African Championships in Athletics. She represented Kenya at the 2006 Commonwealth Games and the 2007 All-Africa Games.

From 2007 onwards she focused more on German and French road races. She is a two-time winner of the Hamburg Half Marathon and was the 2012 winner of the BIG 25 Berlin. She has a 10K best of 32:32, a half marathon best of 1:08:36 and a marathon best of 2:30:34.

== Career ==
Born in Kapsigoria Village in Kenya's Elgeyo Marakwet county, Chepkwony's first success came at the 2001 African Junior Athletics Championships, where she was the silver medallist in the 5000 metres behind Vivian Cheruiyot. In 2004, she was second in the 5000 metres at both the Kenyan Athletics Championships and the Olympic trial race. She did not have the qualifying time to attend the 2004 Athens Olympics, but was selected for the 2004 African Championships in Athletics and won the bronze medal at that competition.

She won her first national title in 2005 and set an 800 m best of 2:03.6, but again did not have the standard for the major championship (the 2005 World Championships). She competed at the 2006 Commonwealth Games but did not make it past the first round. It was that year that she first began to compete in European road races and she won the Spiridon Silvesterlauf, Basler Stadtlauf, Course de l'Escalade, Course du Noël and set a course record at La Corrida Bulloise. She continued to mix road races and track running in 2007 and ran for Kenya in both the 800 m and the 1500 metres at the 2007 All-Africa Games.

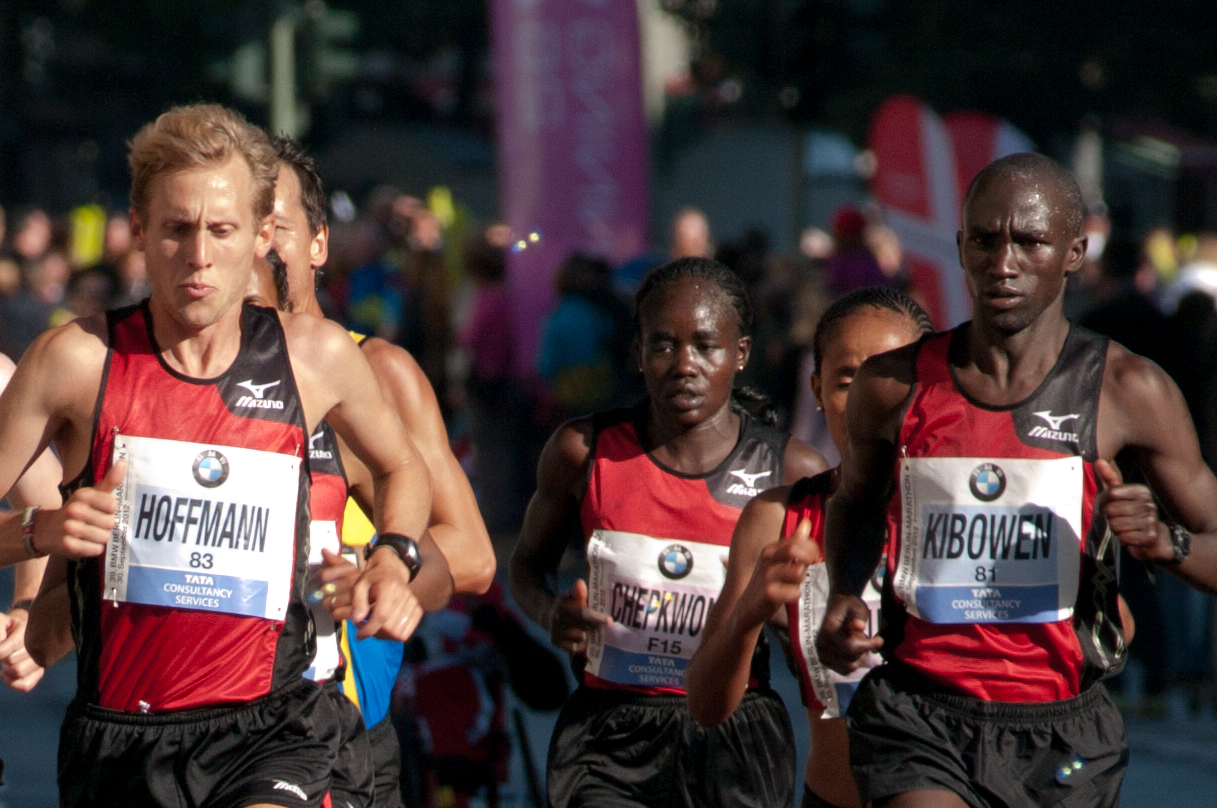
Chepkwony (centre) competing at the 2012 Berlin Marathon

Chepkwony missed the 2008 season but successfully returned in 2009 with a focus on road events, winning the Course de l'Escalade for a second time and taking the Hamburg Half Marathon title with a time of 1:15:22 for her debut over the distance. She competed in smaller scale events in 2010 but was rewarded with numerous victories, including the Lotto Cross Cup Brussels, the Kö-Lauf and Alsterlauf Hamburg 10K runs, half marathons in Hamburg and Altötting, and the Zürcher Silvesterlauf. In 2011, she retained her titles in Brussels, Hamburg and Zürich, as well winning the Course du Noël for a second time. In addition, she won the Murtenlauf and Kerzerslauf races for the first time.

The 2012 saw Chepkwony begin to participate in higher standard road competitions. She ran a personal best of 68:36 minutes for third place at the Berlin Half Marathon, then won the BIG 25 Berlin race. This earned her a place in the elite selection for the 2012 Berlin Marathon and in her first attempt at the classic distance she managed to finish in 2:30:34 hours, coming in seventh place. Aside from her exploits in Berlin she repeated her win at the Kerzerslauf (setting a course record), won the Grand Prix von Bern 10-miler, and had another win at the Course du Noël.

She made three half marathon outings in 2013 and finished in the top three each time, coming third at the Paris Half Marathon and runner-up at the Göteborgsvarvet and Ústí nad Labem Half Marathon. The Ljubljana Marathon saw her make her best ever run for the distance, as she won the race in a time of 2:27:27.

== Competition record ==
Year	Competition	Venue	Position	Event	Notes
2001	African Junior Championships	Réduit, Mauritius	2nd	5000 metres	
2004	African Championships	Brazzaville, Republic of Congo	3rd	800 metres	
2006	Commonwealth Games	Melbourne, Australia	20th (heats)	800 metres	
2007	All-Africa Games	Algiers, Algeria	5th	800 metres	
2007	All-Africa Games	Algiers, Algeria	13th (heats)	1500 metres	

== Notes ==
- ^{[nb]} The official IAAF birth date for Chepkwony is 27 April 1985. Other sources list her date of birth as 18 April 1984.
