= Natalya Orlova =

Russian politician

Natalya Orlova MP
- Наталья Орлова
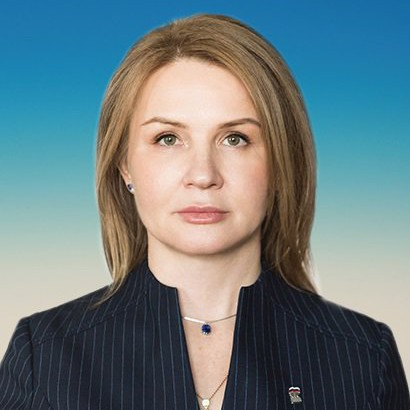
- official portrait, circa 2021

Member of the State Duma (Party List Seat)
- Incumbent
- Assumed office 12 October 2021

Personal details
- Born: 29 August 1969 (age 56) Rubtsovsk, Altai Krai, Russian SFSR, Soviet Union
- Party: United Russia
- Education: Kustanai Agricultural Institute; RANEPA

Natalya Alexeyevna Orlova (Russian: Наталья Алексеевна Орлова; born 29 August 1969, Rubtsovsk, Altai Krai) is a Russian political figure and a deputy of the 8th State Duma.

In 2004, Orlova was appointed Deputy Head of the Department for Financial and Economic Support of the Central Executive Committee of the All-Russian Political Party United Russia. From 2012 to 2021, she served as the First Deputy Head of the Central Executive Committee of the United Russia Party. She was an authorized representative for financial matters of the candidate for the post of President of the Russian Federation Vladimir Putin in the elections of 2004, 2008, 2012, 2018. Since September 2021, she has served as a deputy of the 8th State Dumas where she joined the Committee for Transport and Development of Transport Infrastructure.

== Sanctions ==
She is one of the members of the State Duma the United States Treasury sanctioned on 24 March 2022 in response to the 2022 Russian invasion of Ukraine.

She was sanctioned by the UK government in 2022 in relation to the Russo-Ukrainian War.
