= Furtuna Zegergish =

Eritrean long-distance runner

Furtuna Zegergish (born 1989) is an Eritrean long-distance runner who specializes in the half marathon.

== Achievements ==
Year	Tournament	Venue	Result	Event
2006	World Cross Country Championships	Fukuoka, Japan	24th	Junior race
2006	African Championships	Bambous, Mauritius	6th	10,000 m
2007	World Cross Country Championships	Mombasa, Kenya	8th	Junior race
2007	World Cross Country Championships	Mombasa, Kenya	2nd	Junior team
2007	World Road Running Championships	Udine, Italy	21st	20 km
2007	All-Africa Games	Algiers, Algeria	6th	10,000 m
2008	World Cross Country Championships	Edinburgh, Scotland	31st	Senior race
2008	World Half Marathon Championships	Rio de Janeiro, Brazil	12th	Half marathon
2009	World Half Marathon Championships	Birmingham, England	23rd	Half marathon

=== Personal bests ===
- 5000 metres : 15:37.14 min (2009)
- 10,000 metres : 33:24.87 min (2007)
- Half marathon : 1:09:41 hrs (2009)
