= Athletics at the 2007 All-Africa Games – Women's 10,000 metres =

The women's 10,000 metres at the 2007 All-Africa Games were held on July 21.

== Results ==
Rank	Name	Nationality	Time	Notes
1st place, gold medalist(s)	Mestawet Tufa	Ethiopia	31:26.05	
2nd place, silver medalist(s)	Edith Masai	Kenya	31:31.18	
3rd place, bronze medalist(s)	Irene Kwambai	Kenya	31:36.78	
4	Ashu Kasim	Ethiopia	32:09.67	
5	Teyiba Erkesso	Ethiopia	32:47.25	
6	Furtuna Zegergish	Eritrea	33:24.87	NR
7	Angeline Nyiransabimana	Rwanda	33:51.27	
8	Francine Nizigiyimana	Burundi	34:25.78	
	Esther Maina	Kenya	DNF	
