= 2004 African Championships in Athletics – Women's 800 metres =

The women's 800 metres event at the 2004 African Championships in Athletics was held in Brazzaville, Republic of the Congo on July 16.

== Results ==
Rank	Name	Nationality	Time	Notes
1st place, gold medalist(s)	Saïda El Mehdi	Morocco	2:03.52	
2nd place, silver medalist(s)	Charity Wandia	Kenya	2:04.08	
3rd place, bronze medalist(s)	Caroline Chepkwony	Kenya	2:04.58	
4	Léontine Tsiba	Republic of the Congo	2:05.34	
5	Aminata Sylla	Senegal	2:11.72	
6	Marieme Niang Ndeye	Senegal	2:12.07	
7	Dipa Traoré	Mali	2:17.39	
