= Laban Chege =

Kenyan athlete

Laban Chege (born 10 September 1969) is a Kenyan athlete who specialises in middle and long distance running. He finished tenth at the 1997 IAAF World Half Marathon Championships, and a seventh-place finish at the 1999 edition helped him win a bronze medal with Kenya in the team competition.

He won the Marseille-Cassis Classique Internationale race on consecutive occasions in 1995 and 1996. He won the City to Surf race in Sydney twice in 1999 and 2000. He has also competed in cross country running, having won the 1998 Belfast International Cross Country meeting.
