= Tara Palm =

Australian long-distance runner

Personal information
- Born: 28 July 1985 (age 40)

Sport
- Country: Australia
- Event: Long-distance running
Medal record
Women's athletics
Representing Australia
Oceania Athletics Championships
Bronze medal – third place	2019 Townsville	5000 m

Tara Palm (born 28 July 1985) is an Australian long-distance runner.

In 2009, she competed in the senior women's race at the 2009 IAAF World Cross Country Championships held in Amman, Jordan. She finished in 80th place.

In 2013, she competed in the senior women's race at the 2013 IAAF World Cross Country Championships held in Bydgoszcz, Poland. She finished in 94th place.

In 2019, she won the bronze medal in the women's 5000 metres event at the 2019 Oceania Athletics Championships held in Townsville, Australia. In 2019, she also won the City2Surf event held in Sydney, Australia.
