= Leanne Pompeani =

Australian long-distance runner

Personal information
- Born: 25 June 1996 (age 29)

Sport
- Country: Australia
- Sport: Long-distance running

Leanne Pompeani (born 25 June 1996) is an Australian long-distance runner. She competed in the senior women's race at the 2019 IAAF World Cross Country Championships held in Aarhus, Denmark. She finished in 45th place.

In 2022 and 2024, she won the City2Surf and Burnie Ten road races, setting a Burnie Ten course record in 2024. She also won the Burnie Ten in 2025.
