= Haley McGregor =

Australian athletics competitor

Haley McGregor or Hayley McGregor is a retired Australian runner.

== 2002 Commonwealth Games ==
At the 2002 Commonwealth Games, she finished 11th in the Women's 5000 metres. She was the national champion in 2002 at that distance to secure her Commonwealth Games spot.

== 2004 Olympics ==
At the 2004 Olympics, she finished 25th in the Women's 10,000 metres. She was national runner-up in 2004 at that distance, but since she was defeated by someone with the A-Standard she was also selected to compete.

== Other running achievements ==
She has competed multiple times at the IAAF World Cross Country Championships.

She was a multiple-time winner of the Zatopek Classic. In the 2004 race she earned her Olympic qualifying time.

In 2003 and 2004, she won both the City to Surf in Sydney and the Burnie Ten.

In addition, she was runner-up in the 2005 Rock 'n' Roll Arizona Marathon.

== Kayak career ==
McGregor was an accomplished kayak athlete. She earned a scholarship to the Victorian Institute of Sport and won multiple Victoria championships.
