= Real Insurance Sydney Harbour 10k =

Running race in Sydney, Australia

The Real Insurance Harbour 10 is an Australian 10 km road race, held annually in Sydney, Australia. The event is certified accurate and is approved by the Association of International Marathons and Distance Races (AIMS).

The Real Insurance Sydney Harbour 10 has been running since 2012 and can be used as a test event before the winter classics. The Real Insurance Sydney Harbour 10 also has an additional 5k course which will be running for the first time in 2014.

In 2025 the Real Insurance Sydney Harbour 10k rebranded to become the Real Insurance Harbour 10.

== Course route ==
The event starts and finishes in the historic area of The Rocks with the course hugging Sydney Harbour around Barangaroo and Darling Harbour. Features en route include the Overseas Passenger Terminal, the Opera House, the Harbour Bridge, Cockle Bay, Tumbalong Park and Pyrmont Bay.

== Winners 10km ==
Year	Male Winner	! Country	Time
2014	Liam Adams	Australia	00:29:06
2013	Liam Adams	Australia	00:29:43
2012	Martin Dent	Australia	00.28:37*

- Fastest time ran in Australia in 2012

Year	Female Winner	! Country	Time
2014	Lauren Hamilton	Australia	00:34:12
2013	Lisa Weightman	Australia	00:32:12
2012	Lara Tamsett	Australia	00:32:39

== Winners 5km ==
Year	Male Winner	! Country	Time
2014	Hayden O'Neill	Australia	00:16:51

Year	Female Winner	! Country	Time
2014	Melinda Witchard	Australia	00:18:20

== See also ==
- City2Surf (Sydney)
