= Saïda El Mehdi =

Moroccan middle-distance runner

Medal record

Women's athletics

Representing Morocco

African Championships
Gold medal – first place	2004 Brazzaville	800 m
Silver medal – second place	2004 Brazzaville	1500 m

Saïda El Mehdi (born 21 September 1981) is a Moroccan middle-distance runner who specializes in the 800 and 1500 metres.

In 2004, she won an 800 m gold medal and a 1500 m silver medal at the 2004 African Championships in Athletics and she was the 1500 m bronze medallist at the 2004 Pan Arab Games. The following year she won medals in both events at the 2005 Jeux de la Francophonie.

She was suspended for two years after she failed a doping test at the Meeting SEAT in Paris in February 2009. Having tested positive for the steroid stanozolol, she was banned from competition until 29 April 2011.

== Achievements ==
Year	Competition	Venue	Position	Notes
2004	African Championships	Brazzaville, Republic of the Congo	1st	800 m
2004	African Championships	Brazzaville, Republic of the Congo	2nd	1500 m
2005	Jeux de la Francophonie	Niamey, Niger	3rd	800 m
2005	Jeux de la Francophonie	Niamey, Niger	2nd	1500 m
2006	African Championships	Bambous, Mauritius	4th	1500 m

=== Personal bests ===
- 800 metres – 2:01.85 (2006)
- 1500 metres – 4:08.60 (2004)
- 3000 metres – 9:04.69 (2006)

== See also ==
- List of doping cases in athletics
