= Julie Culley =

American track and field athlete

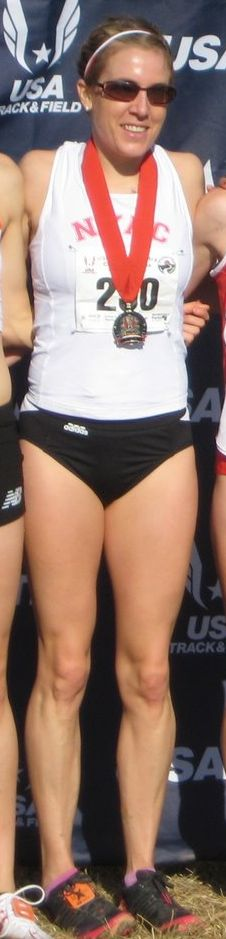
- Julie Culley at the 2009; U.S. Cross Country Championships

Personal information
- Born: September 10, 1981 (age 44)

Sport
- Country: United States
- Event(s): 1500 m, 5000 m, Cross Country
- College team: Rutgers University
- Club: New York Athletic Club
- Coached by: Matt Centrowitz

Achievements and titles
- Olympic finals: 2012 Finalist 5000m
- World finals: 2009, 5000 m
- Personal best(s): 1500 m: 4:12.61 Mile: 4:34:80 5000 m: 15:05.38

Julie Culley (born September 10, 1981) is an American track and field athlete, who competes in middle distance track events. Culley represented the United States at the 2012 Olympic Games in London in the 5000 m.

While competing for Rutgers University, Culley was an All-American in Cross Country her senior year. Despite often battling injuries, she set school records in the 3000 m, 5000 m, and Distance Medley Relay, and was a Big East Scholar Athlete of the Year.

Culley went on to coach at Loyola College in Baltimore from 2004 - 2007, before deciding to focus on running professionally.

Culley went on to coach at Georgetown University in September 2014.

At the 2008 U.S. Olympic Trials, Culley finished 7th in the 5000 m, with a time of 15:34.43. She was the first American finisher at the 2009 World Cross Country Championships, finishing 21st with a time of 28:08.

Culley finished fourth at the 2009 USA Championships in the 5000 m. She earned a spot on the U.S. 2009 World Championship team by attaining the "B" standard with a time of 15:20.53 at the 5000 m in Liège, Belgium.

At the 2009 World Championships, Culley finished seventh in the first heat of the 5000 m in 15:32.33 and did not advance.

Raised in Lebanon Township, New Jersey, Culley graduated from North Hunterdon High School in 1999. She lived in Arlington, Virginia and trained under Olympic runner and current American University coach Matt Centrowitz, training with fellow American middle distance runner Lindsey Gallo. She returned to New Jersey in 2010, where she trains with coach Frank Gagliano.

On June 28, 2012, Culley qualified for the 2012 Summer Olympics with a first-place finish in the women's 5000 m at the 2012 United States Olympic Trials. She ran a personal best in the heats, and finished in 14th in the final.

On April 28, 2013, Culley ran 15:41.41 at Payton Jordan 5,000 m.

== Personal bests ==
Track	Event	Time (min)	Venue	Date
Outdoor
Outdoor	1500 m	4:12.61	West Chester, PA, USA	June 9, 2012
Outdoor	One mile	4:34.80	Falmouth, MA, USA	August 8, 2008
Outdoor	3000 m	8:45.57	Monaco	July 20, 2012
Outdoor	5000 m	15:05.38	London, England	August 7, 2012
Indoor
Indoor	1500 m	4:17.68	New York, NY, USA	February 9, 2008
Indoor	3000 m	8:55.62	Boston, MA, USA	February 28, 2009

- All information taken from IAAF profile.
