= Leonor Piuza =

Mozambican runner (born 1978)

Leonor Odete Piuza (born 14 April 1978) is a Mozambican runner, who specializes in the 800 metres.

Piuza won the gold medal at the 2007 All-Africa Games and finished sixth at the 2008 African Championships. She also competed at the 2006 Commonwealth Games.

Piuza's personal best time is 2:01.71 minutes, achieved in June 2007 in Villefranche-sur-Saône.

== Competition record ==
Year	Competition	Venue	Position	Event	Notes
Representing Mozambique
2003	All-Africa Games	Abuja, Nigeria	11th (h)	800 m	2:05.19
2006	Commonwealth Games	Melbourne, Australia	9th (sf)	800 m	2:01.84
2006	African Championships	Bambous, Mauritius	13th (h)	800 m	2:10.50
2006	Lusophony Games	Macau	1st	800 m	2:07.34
2007	All-Africa Games	Algiers, Algeria	1st	800 m	2:02.83
2008	African Championships	Addis Ababa, Ethiopia	6th	800 m	2:05.95
2009	Lusophony Games	Lisbon, Portugal	4th	800 m	2:07.48
2009	World Championships	Berlin, Germany	36th (h)	800 m	2:06.72
2010	African Championships	Nairobi, Kenya	7th	800 m	2:08.45
2010	Commonwealth Games	Delhi, India	–	800 m	DNF
2011	All-Africa Games	Maputo, Mozambique	12th (h)	800 m	2:06.72
