= Susie Power-Reeves =

Australian runner

Personal information
- Nationality: Australian
- Born: 26 March 1975 (age 51)
- Height: 175 cm (5 ft 9 in)

Sport
- Sport: Running
- Event: 10000m
Medal record
Women's Athletics
Representing Australia
World Junior Championships in Athletics
Silver medal – second place	1994 Lisbon	3000m
Commonwealth Games
Bronze medal – third place	2002 Manchester	10000 m

Susie Power-Reeves (born 26 March 1975) is an Australian middle- and long-distance runner.

As of 2008, Power-Reeves holds the current women's record for the Sydney City to Surf course, set in 2001. She also holds the Australian women's 1000m time (2:39.4, set in 1993) and several Australian women's under 20 records:

- her above 1000m time
- Mile run (4:32.73, set in 1992)
- 2000m (5:50.47, set in 1994)

Power-Reeves won the women's event in the Sydney City to Surf in 2001 and 2002, and the Sydney Half Marathon in 2003. Her Sydney Half Marathon time is currently the third fastest women's time in the history of the event.
