= Lebogang Phalula =

South African long-distance runner

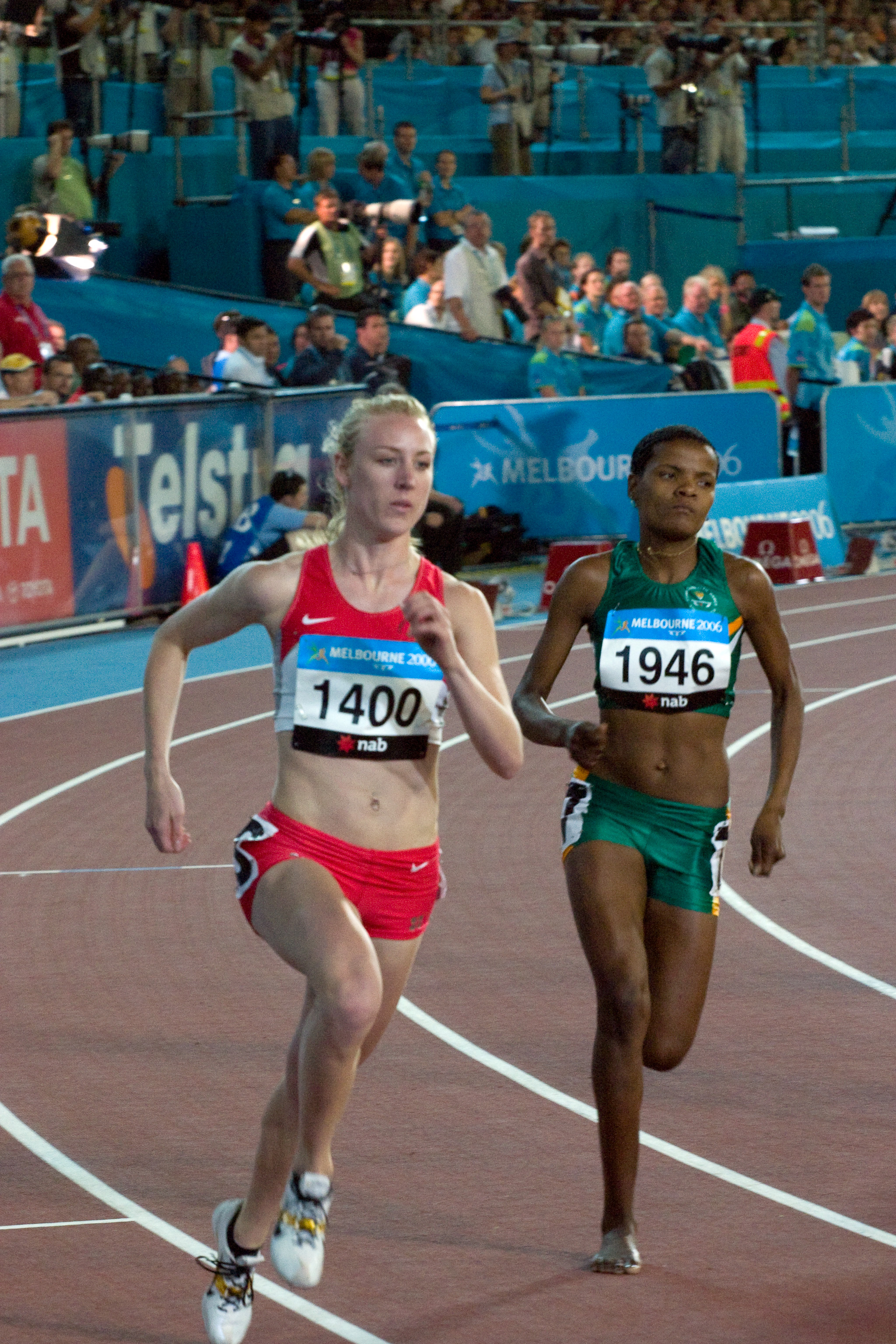
- Phalula (right) 2006 Commonwealth Games semi-final

Personal information
- Born: 9 December 1983 (age 42)

Sport
- Country: South Africa
- Sport: Long-distance running

Lebogang Phalula (born 9 December 1983) is a South African long-distance runner.

In 2009, she competed in the senior women's race at the 2009 IAAF World Cross Country Championships held in Amman, Jordan. She finished in 29th place.

In 2018, she competed in the women's half marathon at the 2018 IAAF World Half Marathon Championships held in Valencia, Spain. She finished in 97th place.

In 2011, she received a six-month ban from the sport after giving a positive test for the banned stimulant methylhexaneamine.

She won the 800 metres title at the 2005 South African Athletics Championships.

She has a twin sister who is also an athlete, the similarly named Dina Lebo Phalula.

== See also ==
- List of doping cases in athletics
