= Lara Tamsett =

Former Long Distance Runner

Lara Ellen Rowe
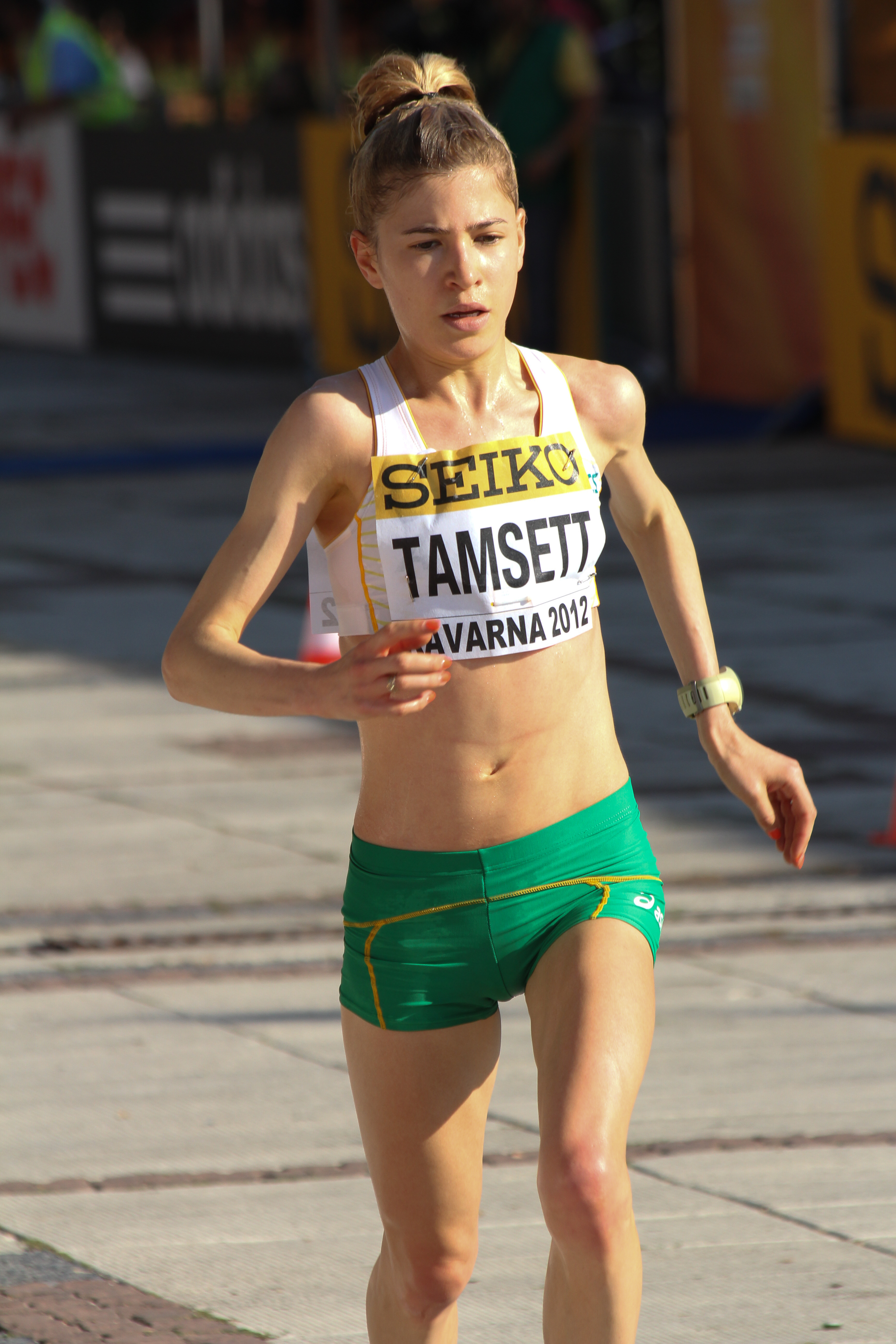
- at the 2012 World Half Marathon Championships
- Born: Lara Ellen Tamsett; October 12, 1988 (age 37); Sydney, New South Wales, Australia
- Citizenship: Australian
- Occupation: Runner
- Years active: 1995 - 2015

Lara Tamsett (born 12 October 1988) is an Australian long-distance runner.

In 2009, she competed in the senior women's race at the 2009 IAAF World Cross Country Championships held in Amman, Jordan. She finished in 26th place.

In 2012, she competed at the 2012 IAAF World Half Marathon Championships held in Kavarna, Bulgaria. In 2013, she competed in the women's 10,000 metres at the 2013 World Championships in Athletics held in Moscow, Russia. She did not finish her race.
