= Lindsey Gallo =

American track and field athlete

Personal information
- Born: November 29, 1981 (age 44) Freehold Township, New Jersey, United States
- Education: Ross School of Business

Sport
- Sport: Track and field

Lindsey Gallo (born November 29, 1981) is a University of Michigan accounting professor and former American track and field athlete who competed in middle-distance events.

== High school ==
Gallo grew up in Freehold Township, New Jersey and attended Howell High School in Howell Township, New Jersey from 1996 to 2000. During this time, she competed in both cross country and track. In track, she was the Group IV state champion of New Jersey in the 3200-meter run during both her sophomore (1998) and senior (2000) outdoor track seasons, running times of 11:11.38 and 10:57.44, respectively. During these same two seasons, she was also a state champion in the 1600-meter run with times of 5:07.28 and 4:52.65, respectively. During her sophomore season, she won the 1600-meter run at the New Jersey Meet of Champions with a time of 5:04.38. She was runner-up in both the 1600-meter and 3200-meter runs at this meet during her senior year.

== College ==
Gallo continued running as a student-athlete at the University of Michigan in the fall of 2000, majoring in business and competing in both cross country and track. During her final three seasons of cross country, Gallo earned All-Big Ten first team honors, finishing in seventh place each year at the conference meet.

== Post-collegiate/professional ==
Following college, Gallo began running professionally with sponsorship from Reebok. Her first professional competition was in the 1500-meter run at the USATF Outdoor Championships in June 2005, where she took fifth place with a time of 4:08.60. As the summer progressed, she improved her time in this event to 4:05.75. The following summer, she finished runner-up to Treniere Clement at outdoor nationals with a time of 4:10.72.

She then moved from Michigan to Arlington, Virginia, where she was coached by American University running coach Matt Centrowitz.

In May 2014, she received a Ph.D. in business administration from the University of Maryland and shortly thereafter began her professorship at the University of Michigan.

== Achievements ==
- 2004 Big Ten Outdoor Track & Field Champion (800-meter run, 1500-meter run)
- 2004 NCAA Mideast Regional Champion (1500-meter run)
- 2005 Big Ten Medal of Honor
- 2005 Big Ten Indoor Track & Field Champion (Mile, 3000-meter run, 5000-meter run)
- 2005 NCAA Indoor Track & Field Champion (Distance Medley Relay)
- 2008 US Olympic Trials, 6th-place (1500-meter run)
- 2009 Boston Indoor Games, 1st place (mile)
