= Harry Summers (runner) =

Australian long-distance runner

Personal information
- Born: 19 May 1990 (age 35) Sydney, Australia

Sport
- Country: Australia
- Event: Long-distance running

Harry Summers (born 19 May 1990) is an Australian long-distance runner.

In 2012, he competed in the men's half marathon at the 2012 IAAF World Half Marathon Championships held in Kavarna, Bulgaria. He finished in 24th place.

In 2014, he competed in the men's 10,000 metres at the 2014 Commonwealth Games held in Glasgow, Scotland. He finished in 18th place.

In 2019, he competed in the senior men's race at the 2019 IAAF World Cross Country Championships held in Aarhus, Denmark. He finished in 56th place. In 2019, he won the City2Surf event held in Sydney, Australia for the third time, having previously won in 2016 and 2017.
