= Dina Lebo Phalula =

South African long-distance runner

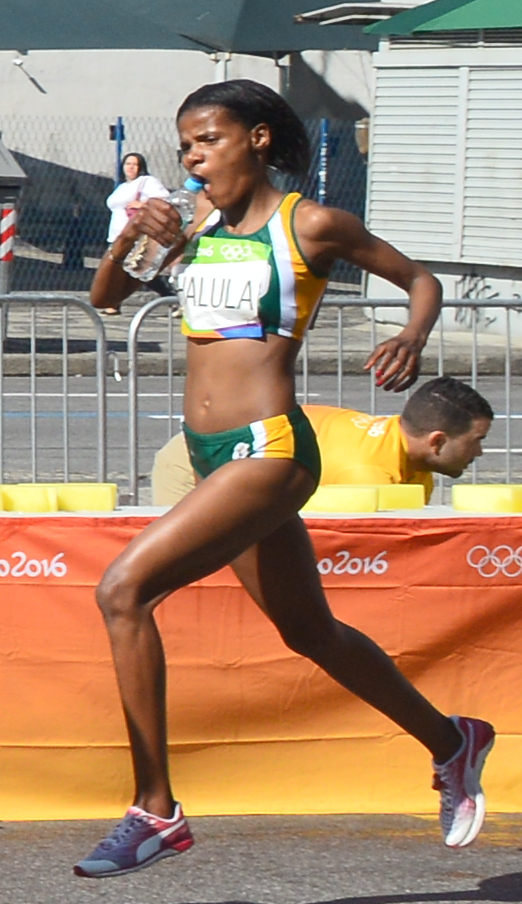
- Dina Lebo Phalula at the 2016 Summer Olympics

Personal information
- Born: 9 December 1983 (age 41)
- Height: 165 cm (5 ft 5 in)
- Weight: 46 kg (101 lb)

Sport
- Country: South Africa
- Sport: Track and field
- Event: Marathon

Dina Lebo Phalula (born 9 December 1983) is a South African long-distance runner who specialises in the marathon. She competed in the women's marathon event at the 2016 Summer Olympics. She finished in 63rd place with a time of 2:41:46.

She has a twin sister who is also an athlete, the similarly named Lebogang Phalula.

She won the 1500 metres title at the 2005 South African Athletics Championships.
