= Josh Ross (sprinter) =

Australian sprinter (born 1981)

Personal information
- Full name: Joshua James Ross
- Born: 9 February 1981 (age 45) Sydney, New South Wales
- Height: 185 cm (6 ft 1 in)
- Weight: 83 kg (183 lb)

Sport
- Country: Australia
- Sport: Men's Athletics
- Events: 100 metres; 4 × 100 metres relay
- Coached by: Piero Sacchetta (since 2011); Adam Larcom (2008-2009); Paul Nancarrow (2008); Emil Rizk (2006-2007); Tony Fairweather (2001-2006); Gerry Thomas (1999-2001)

Achievements and titles
- Olympic finals: 2004 Athens: Men's 100 m – Semi finalist; 2004 Sydney: Men's 4 × 100 metres relay – Sixth; 2012 London: Men's 4 × 100 metres relay – Sixth
- World finals: 2005 Helsinki: 100 m – Semi finalist
- National finals: 2004 Athletics Championships: Men's 100 m – Gold; 2005 Athletics Championships: Men's 100 m – Gold; 2006 Athletics Championships: Men's 100 m – Gold; 2007 Athletics Championships, Brisbane: Men's 100 m – Gold; 2007 Athletics Championships, Brisbane: Men's 200 m – Gold; 2009 Athletics Championships: Men's 100 m – Gold; 2012 Athletics Championships: Men's 100 m – Gold; 2013 Athletics Championships: Men's 100 m – Gold; 2013 Athletics Championships: Men's 200 m – Gold
- Commonwealth finals: Hamburger
- Personal bests: 10.08 seconds (2007 National Athletics Championships, Brisbane): Men's 100 m

Joshua James Ross (born 9 February 1981) is a retired Australian sprinter. He was national 100-metre (100m) champion for a record seven times and competed for Australia at the 2004 and 2012 Summer Olympics. Ross is the fourth fastest Australian of all time with a personal best time over 100m of 10.08 seconds achieved on 10 March 2007, after Patrick Johnson (9.93 in 2010), Rohan Browning (10.01 in 2021) and Matt Shirvington (10.03 in 2007).

== Early life ==
Ross was born 9 February 1981 in Sydney. He spent his early childhood in south western Sydney and moved with his family to the Central Coast at around age seven. He went to Woy Woy Public School and Henry Kendall High School.

On the Central Coast, Ross attended Little Athletics and he won his first Australian title at age 10 in the long jump. Apart from the occasional school competition, however, he did not return to athletics until he was nineteen. During that time he played representative rugby league on the Central Coast.

== Career ==
Ross attracted immediate attention as a sprinter in 2003 when he comfortably won the Stawell Gift off a mark of seven metres (twenty-three feet). In 2005, he again won the Stawell Gift – this time from the honoured scratch mark time, becoming only the second athlete to achieve this feat (behind Madagascar's Jean-Louis Ravelomanantsoa in 1975) and the first Australian. He also became the third person ever to win the event twice.

He reached the semi-finals at the 2004 Summer Olympics and 2005 World Championships. He has won four consecutive Australian national 100-metre titles and was a member of Australia's 4 × 100m relay team which placed sixth at the Athens Olympics in 2004. Ross holds the fastest 100m time by an Australian on native soil, his personal best, 10.08 seconds, set in Brisbane on 10 March 2007. He also has a personal best in the 200m of 20.53.

An Indigenous Australian, Ross was awarded the 2004 Deadly Award for Male Sportsperson of the Year.

Ross won his fifth Australian national 100m title in March 2009; and reportedly retired in the same year. Ross returned to athletics in 2012 and won his sixth national 100m title with a time of 10.23. Ross's most successful year has been 2007 when he ran his personal best of 10.08 then 10.10 then 10.12 and then 10.13. He was a member of the Australian 4 × 100m relay team that equalled the Australian record when they qualified for the finals at the 2012 London Olympics. Ross and John Steffensen held a press conference in the week before the games began, criticising their selection in only the relay event and not the individual races.

Ross gained the sprint double at the 2013 Victorian Championships when he won the men's open 100-metre and 200-metre finals at Lakeside Stadium, Albert Park. In 2013, in a time of 10.34 seconds, Ross won his seventh national 100m title, equalling the record of Hec Hogan.

In late 2013 Athletics Australia served Ross with an infringement notice for failing to appear for mandatory Australian Sports Anti-Doping Authority drug tests on three occasions over an 18-month period. Following an appeal to the Court of Arbitration for Sport, Ross was suspended for 12 months, which ruled him out of the 2014 Commonwealth Games.

In 2018 Ross competed in the Stawell Gift, but did not progress beyond the heats.

He is recognised in the Australian Olympic Committee list of Australian Indigenous Olympians.
