= Canberra Marathon =

Annual race in Australia held since 1976

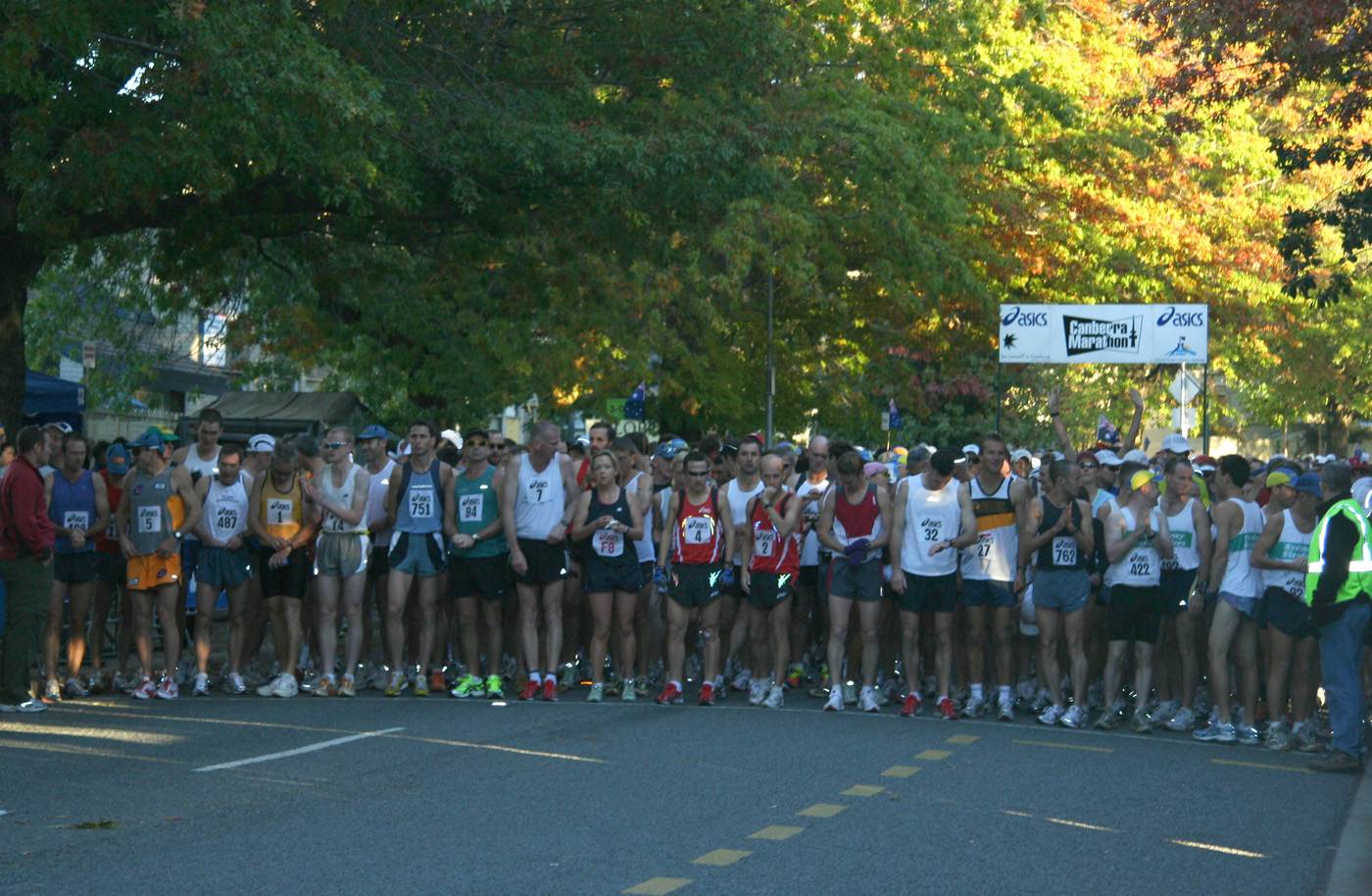
- Start line in 2006
- Date: Mid-April
- Location: Canberra, Australia
- Event type: Road
- Distance: Marathon, Half marathon, 10K run, 5K run, Ultramarathon
- Primary sponsor: Canberra Times
- Established: 1976 (50 years ago)
- Course records: Men's: 2:15:02 (1995) (Australia) John Andrews; Women's: 2:32:57 (1994) (Australia) Sue Hobson
- Website: Canberra Times Marathon Festival
- Participants: 1,600 (2021)

The Canberra Times Marathon Festival is an annual marathon held in the city of Canberra, Australian Capital Territory. The marathon was established in 1976 and is the oldest city marathon in Australia. The marathon was initially held on November before being moved to April in 1979.

== History ==
The marathon was first held in November 1976 and had 30 people start. It was founded by John Harding, who also was the race director and inaugural winner, with a finish time of 2:36:39. The whole purpose of the event was to allow John Harding to get a qualifying time in order to enter the Australian Marathon. In total 17 people completed the course of which 14 finished in under 3 hours.

In November 1977, the race was known as the "Pre-Pacific Conference Games Marathon" with a total of 85 finishers. The 1978 race had 260 participants and was known as the "Canberra International Marathon" after which it was decided to run the marathon in April to avoid clashing with other races with the 1979 race restricted to 300 runners. The number of runners peaked in 1984 with almost 2,400 starters but dropped in the late 1980s to around 500 runners each year.

The event was sponsored by Nike from 1979 to 1989 before sponsorship was taken over by the ACT Academy of Sport for the 1990 race with a $7,000 sponsorship package. Sponsorship for the race was then provided by Mobil starting in 1991.

The 1995 race was the Australian trial for the IAAF World Marathon Cup after being nominated by Athletics Australia.

From 2003 a memorandum of understanding was undertaken with ACT Cross Country Club to give Cundy Sports Marketing responsibility to manage the event.

In 2010 a dispute between the two groups both claiming to own the event (Cundy Sports Marketing and ACT Cross Country Club) went to court to resolve. As a result of this, government approvals for the event were not granted and the race was not held. As a result of this the ACT Cross Country Club disbanded. The 2011 event was organised by Fairfax Events as part of the Australian Running Festival.

The 2020 in-person edition of the race was postponed to 2021 due to the COVID-19 pandemic, with all entries automatically transferred to 2021 and all registrants given the option of also running the race virtually and receiving a medal for free. The 2021 race attracted 1,600 entries.

== Course ==
In 2014 the race course moved from being a 3-lap race starting and finishing at Telopea Park School in Manuka to a new, single lap, route starting and finishing at Old Parliament House after passing landmarks such as the National Zoo & Aquarium, Government House and Telstra Tower.

The marathon starts at Telopea Park School in the suburb of Manuka, within sight of Parliament House. The route starts with a 10 km (6.2 mi) lap around the old and new Parliament buildings and other major government buildings. This is followed by a double lap crossing Lake Burley Griffin (over the Kings Avenue and Commonwealth Avenue bridges) and along Parkes Way out towards the Glenloch interchange near the Telstra Tower landmark.

== Other awards ==
Runners who complete ten Canberra marathons are given the honorary title of 'Griffin', after Walter Burley Griffin, the designer of the city of Canberra. 20 or more finishes receives the title of 'Burley Griffin' and 30 or more finishes the title of 'Walter Burley Griffin'.

== Other races ==
The event has five races: 5 km race on a Saturday, and the 10 km, half marathon, marathon and ultramarathon on the following day.

The ultramarathon allows those registered for the marathon to "go beyond the marathon" and compete in a 50 km (31 mi) event. At the time, once participants completed the marathon, they were recorded as marathon finishers and were eligible to run a few extra kilometres to also complete the 50 km race. The ultramarathon and marathon were later split into separate races with separate start times.

== Community impact ==
Under the Australian Running Festival, the event worked to fundraise approximately $200,000 for over 250 charities in 2018. Individuals or teams may participate in the event and work towards fundraising money for their charity of choice; with some teams, such as 'Team Beyond Blue' raising $25,099. Individuals or teams that are participating in the event contribute a donation as part of their entry and may also work towards accumulating sponsors.

== Winners ==
Key: Course record

Ed.	Year	Men's winner	Time	Women's winner	Time	Ref.
1	1976	John Harding (AUS)	2:36:39	—	—	
2	1977	Chris Wardlaw (AUS)	2:27:42	—	—	
3	1978	Geoffrey Moore (AUS)	2:26:58	Susan Hill (AUS)	2:59:28	
4	1979	John Stanley (AUS)	2:18:45	Mary Murison (AUS)	3:10:00	
5	1980	Chris Pilone (NZL)	2:17:51	Susan Hill (AUS)	2:55:17	
6	1981	Graeme Kennedy (AUS)	2:15:16	Judith Hine (NZL)	2:44:08	
7	1982	Derek Froude (NZL)	2:17:45	Shane Barrett (AUS)	2:45:12	
8	1983	Colin Neave (AUS)	2:16:57	Ngaire Drake (NZL)	2:44:11	
9	1984	Grenville Wood (AUS)	2:15:50	Lisa Martin (AUS)	2:35:05	
10	1985	Colin Neave (AUS)	2:21:27	Iris Cook (AUS)	2:54:45	
11	1986	Graham Macky (NZL)	2:21:21	Rhonda Mallinder (AUS)	2:46:29	
12	1987	Garrick Hand (AUS)	2:19:00	Annette McNeil (AUS)	2:49:43	
13	1988	Gerard Barrett (AUS)	2:15:07	Annette McNeil (AUS)	2:48:18	
14	1989	Gerard Ryan (AUS)	2:26:55	Trudy Fenton (AUS)	2:41:39	
15	1990	Derek Froude (NZL)	2:22:24	Mary Silver (AUS)	2:58:00	
16	1991	Colin Neave (AUS)	2:23:23	Joanne Cowan (AUS)	2:46:18	
17	1992	Gerard Barrett (AUS)	2:19:46	Joanne Cowan (AUS)	2:42:31	
18	1993	Gerard Barrett (AUS)	2:22:20	Joanne Cowan (AUS)	2:42:00	
19	1994	Allan Carman (AUS)	2:19:39	Sue Hobson (AUS)	2:32:57	
20	1995	John Andrews (AUS)	2:15:02	Joanne Cowan (AUS)	2:41:48	
21	1996	Vin McCarthy (AUS)	2:25:39	Birgit Schuckmann (GER)	2:42:43	
22	1997	Edward Nabunone (INA)	2:23:38	Gabrielle O'Rourke (NZL)	2:42:45	
23	1998	Paul Wilson (AUS)	2:23:25	Robin Roocke (AUS)	2:51:05	
24	1999	Raymond Boyd (AUS)	2:18:01	Melissa Bulloch (AUS)	2:47:30	
—	2000	not held due to Host City Marathon in Sydney				
25	2001	Gemechu Woyecha (QAT)	2:16:23	Susan Michelsson (AUS)	2:41:59	
26	2002	Gemechu Woyecha (QAT)	2:20:20	Elizabeth Miller (AUS)	2:49:09	
27	2003	Gemechu Woyecha (AUS)	2:22:35	Nyla Carroll (NZL)	2:38:56	
28	2004	Martin Dent (AUS)	2:15:12	Shireen Crumpton (NZL)	2:43:21	
29	2005	Magnus Michelsson (AUS)	2:21:01	Belinda Schipp (AUS)	2:43:52	
30	2006	Barry Keem (AUS)	2:24:10	Shireen Crumpton (NZL)	2:42:55	
31	2007	Magnus Michelsson (AUS)	2:20:55	Magdaliní Karímali (GRE)	2:43:40	
32	2008	Mark Tucker (AUS)	2:24:13	Jackie Fairweather (AUS)	2:46:01	
33	2009	David Criniti (AUS)	2:26:09	Magdaliní Karímali (GRE)	2:43:19	
—	2010	cancelled due to ownership dispute				
34	2011	Rowan Walker (AUS)	2:24:14	Magdaliní Karímali (GRE)	2:50:49	
35	2012	Anthony Farrugia (AUS)	2:28:23	Magdaliní Karímali (GRE)	2:47:45	
36	2013	Rowan Walker (AUS)	2:24:23	Magdaliní Karímali (GRE)	2:52:46	
37	2014	Samuel Woldeamanuel (ETH)	2:21:38	Kirsten Molloy (AUS)	2:49:57	
38	2015	Rowan Walker (AUS)	2:26:27	Fleur Flanery (AUS)	2:53:54	
39	2016	Rowan Walker (AUS)	2:28:43	Ruth Wilson (AUS)	2:46:55	
40	2017	Matthew Cox (AUS)	2:21:38	Leah Fitzgerald (AUS)	2:58:41	
41	2018	Dion Finocchiaro (AUS)	2:25:38	Kirsten Molloy (AUS)	3:00:57	
42	2019	Nick Earl (GBR)	2:20:25	Stephanie Auston (AUS)	2:43:33	
	2020	not held due to coronavirus pandemic				
43	2021	Myles Gough (AUS)	2:25:18	Riine Ringi (AUS)	2:42:29	
44	2022	Jamie Lacey (AUS)	2:31:28	Marnie Ponton (AUS)	2:43:28	
45	2023	Harry Smithers (AUS)	2:28:24	Cassie Little (AUS)	2:45:00	
