= Gerard Barrett =

Gerard Barrett may refer to:

- Gerard Barrett (runner) (born 1956), Australian long-distance runner
- Gerard Barrett (director) (born 1987), Irish director
- Gerard Barrett (footballer) (1925–2000), Australian rules football player
