= 2003–04 Australian Athletics Championships =

- Dates: 26–29 February 2004
- Host city: Sydney, Australia
- Venue: Sydney Olympic Park Athletic Centre
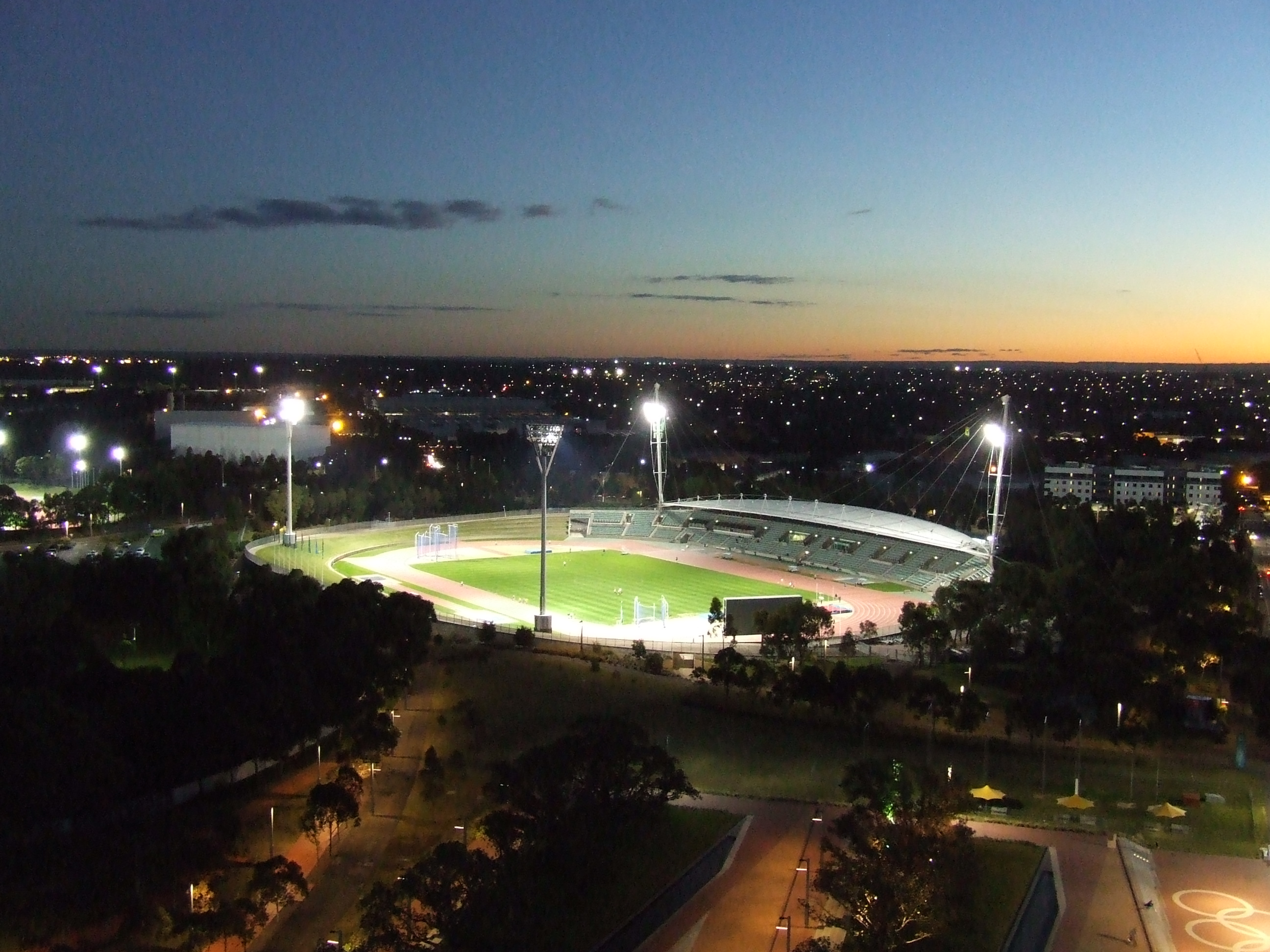

The 2003–04 Australian Athletics Championships was the 82nd edition of the national championship in outdoor track and field for Australia. It was held from 26–29 February 2004 at the Sydney Olympic Park Athletic Centre in Sydney. It served as a selection meeting for Australia at the 2004 Summer Olympics.

== Medal summary ==
=== Men ===
Event	Gold		Silver		Bronze	
100 metres (Wind: +1.5 m/s)	Josh Ross; New South Wales	10.27	Ambrose Ezenwa; New South Wales	10.39	Paul Di Bella; Queensland	10.43
200 metres (Wind: -1.8 m/s)	Ambrose Ezenwa; New South Wales	21.12	Adam Miller; New South Wales	21.19	David Geddes; New South Wales	21.36
200 metres (Wind: -3.7 m/s)	Darryl Wohlsen; Queensland	21.87	Gene Pateman; New Zealand (NZL)	21.89	Andrew McManus; Western Australia	22.26
400 metres	Clinton Hill; New South Wales	45.46	Casey Vincent; Victoria	45.46	John Steffensen; Western Australia	45.63
800 metres	Samwel Mwera; Tanzania (TAN)	1:47.34	Kris McCarthy; Victoria	1:47.99	Todd MacDonald; New South Wales	1:48.37
1500 metres	Youcef Abdi; New South Wales	3:38.43	Alastair Stevenson; Queensland	3:38.78	Michael Shelley; Queensland	3:39.90
5000 metres	Craig Mottram; Victoria	13:31.74	Peter Nowill; Queensland	13:43.03	Michael Power; Victoria	13:43.09
10,000 metres	Lee Troop; Victoria	28:32.43	Andrew Letherby; Victoria	28:39.80	Brett Cartwright; South Australia	28:41.44
110 metres hurdles (Wind: +1.5 m/s)	Kyle Vander-Kuyp; Victoria	13.65	Ryan Purcell; Western Australia	14.11	Duncan Harvey; Queensland	14.14
400 metres hurdles	Elliott Wood; New South Wales	50.05	Nic O'Brien; New Zealand (NZL)	50.62	Matthew Beckenham; Australian Capital Territory	50.83
3000 metres steeplechase	Peter Nowill; Queensland	8:33.21	Richard Jeremiah; Victoria	8:45.68	Scott McTaggart; Australian Capital Territory	8:50.91
4 × 100 m relay	Australia (AUS); Kristopher Neofytou; Adam Basil; Paul Di Bella; Josh Ross	39.60	Victoria (VIC); Tim Williams; David Baxter; Lane Harrison; Justin Lewis	40.29	Queensland (QLD); Damien Bock; Wagui Anau; Adam Dart; Otis Gowa	40.81
4 × 400 m relay	Australia (AUS); Casey Vincent; John Steffensen; Clinton Hill; Patrick Dwyer	3:04.14	Australia (AUS); Mark Ormrod; Paul Pearce; Elliott Wood; James Gurr	3:07.47	New Zealand (NZL); Sam Rapson; Tim Hawkes; Hayden Fisher; Nic O'Brien	3:12.25
High jump	Nicholas Moroney; New South Wales	2.18 m	Joshua Lodge; New South Wales	2.18 m	Jarrad Pozzi; Victoria	2.18 m
Pole vault	Dmitri Markov; Western Australia	5.65 m	Steve Hooker; Victoria	5.65 m	Viktor Chistiakov; South Australia	5.55 m
Long jump	Shane Hair; Western Australia	7.96 m (+4.6 m/s)	Kazushige Inadomi; Japan (JPN)	7.95 m (+3.9 m/s)	Scott Crowe; Australian Capital Territory	7.66 m (+3.4 m/s)
Triple jump	Andrew Murphy; New South Wales	16.87 m (+3.0 m/s)	Kajtek Kielich; New South Wales	15.96 m (-1.3 m/s)	Gavin Manoharan; Queensland	15.87 m (+2.0 m/s)
Shot put	Justin Anlezark; Queensland	20.72 m	Scott Martin; Victoria	19.53 m	Rhys Jones; Queensland	19.16 m
Discus throw	Scott Martin; Victoria	59.40 m	Graham Hicks; Tasmania	58.68 m	Bertrand Vili; France (FRA)	57.62 m
Hammer throw	Stuart Rendell; Australian Capital Territory	77.40 m	Hiroaki Doi; Japan (JPN)	68.12 m	Darren Billett; South Australia	63.29 m
Javelin throw	William Hamlyn-Harris; New South Wales	78.27 m	Oliver Dziubak; Western Australia	75.92 m	Stuart Farquhar; New Zealand (NZL)	72.58 m
Decathlon	Matthew McEwen; Queensland	7600 pts	Jason Dudley; Queensland	7253 pts	Richard Allan; Queensland	7030 pts

=== Women ===
Event	Gold		Silver		Bronze	
100 metres (Wind: +2.8 m/s)	Gloria Kemasuode; New South Wales	11.31	Lauren Hewitt; Victoria	11.45	Sally McLellan; Queensland	11.51
200 metres (Wind: -2.3 m/s)	Lauren Hewitt; Victoria	23.09	Makelesi Bulikiobo; Queensland	23.46	Bindee Goon Chew; Queensland	23.89
400 metres	Annabelle Smith; New South Wales	51.80	Makelesi Bulikiobo; Queensland	52.91	Katerina Dressler; Victoria	53.03
800 metres	Rikke Ronholt; Denmark (DEN)	2:01.68	Tamsyn Lewis; Victoria	2:02.24	Libby Allen; Victoria	2:03.33
1500 metres	Sarah Jamieson; Victoria	4:11.22	Georgie Clarke; Victoria	4:11.64	Lisa Corrigan; New South Wales	4:12.55
5000 metres	Georgie Clarke; Victoria	15:53.31	Emily Morris; New South Wales	15:55.49	Melissa Rollison; New South Wales	16:00.39
10,000 metres	Benita Johnson; Victoria	31:49.97	Haley McGregor; Victoria	32:20.49	Jackie Gallagher; Australian Capital Territory	33:40.05
100 metres hurdles (Wind: -4.0 m/s)	Jacquie Munro; New South Wales	13.55	Sally McLellan; Queensland	13.78	Fiona Cullen; Queensland	13.91
400 metres hurdles	Rebecca Wardell; New Zealand (NZL)	56.97	Milena Alver-McIntosh; New South Wales	58.74 m/s)	Sonja Bowe; New Zealand (NZL)	58.77
3000 metres steeplechase	Marnie Ponton; Australian Capital Territory	10:21.21	Lee-Ann Turner; South Australia	10:57.96	Jane Mudge; South Australia	10:58.53
4 × 100 m relay	Australia (AUS); Bindee Goon Chew; Jessica Knox; Preya Carey; Sally McLellan	44.65	New Zealand (NZL); Sarah Phillips; Monique Williams; Jane Arnott; Chantal Brunner	45.37	New South Wales (NSW); Cathalina Walsh; Nicole Apps; Laura Verlinden; Merryn Aldridge	46.40
4 × 400 m relay	Australia (AUS); Katerina Dressler; Jana Pittman; Rosemary Hayward; Annabelle Smith	3:29.79	Victoria (VIC); Renee Robson; Kristy Radford; Kimberley Crow; Katrina Steward	3:42.53	Western Australia (WA); Ebony Cope; Megan Wheatley; Tricia McDonald; Katherine Hancock	3:53.27
High jump	Petrina Price; New South Wales	1.93 m	Claire Mallett; New South Wales	1.82 m	Angela McKee; New Zealand (NZL)	1.82 m
Pole vault	Kym Howe; Western Australia	4.40 m	Rosanna Ditton; Victoria	4.30 m	Melina Hamilton; New Zealand (NZL)	4.15 m
Long jump	Kerrie Taurima; Australian Capital Territory	6.58 m (+2.0 m/s)	Bronwyn Thompson; Queensland	6.39 m (+1.0 m/s)	Chantal Brunner; New Zealand (NZL)	6.21 m (+0.7 m/s)
Triple jump	Nicole Mladenis; Western Australia	13.49 m (+0.2 m/s)	Carmen Miller; Victoria	12.64 m (+0.3 m/s)	Jeanette Bowles; Victoria	12.62 m (+0.6 m/s)
Shot put	Valerie Adams; New Zealand (NZL)	18.96 m	Alifatou Djibril; South Australia	15.42 m	Michelle Haage; New South Wales	14.71 m
Discus throw	Beatrice Faumuina; New Zealand (NZL)	63.44 m	Debbie Pickersgill; Queensland	56.37 m	Alifatou Djibril; South Australia	56.16 m
Hammer throw	Bronwyn Eagles; New South Wales	67.92 m	Karyne Di Marco; New South Wales	65.17 m	Brooke Krueger; South Australia	63.07 m
Javelin throw	Bina Ramesh; France (FRA)	53.14 m	Rosemary Hooper; Victoria	53.04 m	Serafina Akeli; Samoa (SAM)	OA 53.02 m
Heptathlon	Kylie Wheeler; Western Australia	5790 pts	Gillian Ragus; New South Wales	5502 pts	Lauren Foote; South Australia	5093 pts
