= Oceania Marathon and Half Marathon Championships =

Annual road running competition

- Sport: Marathon running
- Founded: 2008
- Continent: Oceania (OAA)

The Oceania Marathon and Half Marathon Championships are an annual Road running competition organized by the Oceania Athletics Association (OAA) for athletes representing the countries of its member associations. They were established in 2008. Races are featured for male and female athletes. The event is held together with the Gold Coast Marathon. The first three open men and women Oceania athletes to finish the Marathon and Half Marathon will be presented with the Oceania Championship medals.

== Editions ==
	Year	City	Country	Date
I	2008	Gold Coast, Queensland	Australia	July 6
II	2009	Gold Coast, Queensland	Australia	July 5
III	2010	Gold Coast, Queensland	Australia	July 3-4
IV	2011	Gold Coast, Queensland	Australia	July 2-3
V	2012	Gold Coast, Queensland	Australia	June 30-July 1
VI	2013	Gold Coast, Queensland	Australia	July 6-7
VII	2014	Gold Coast, Queensland	Australia	July 5-6
VIII	2015	Gold Coast, Queensland	Australia	July 4-5
IX	2016	Gold Coast, Queensland	Australia	July 2-3
X	2017	Gold Coast, Queensland	Australia	July 1-2

== Results ==
Complete results (beginning in 2009) can be found on the Gold Coast Marathon website. The results for 2008 were extracted from different websites.

=== Men's Marathon ===
Year	Gold		Silver		Bronze	
2008	Rowan Walker (AUS)	2:19:36	Jay Phillpotts (AUS)	2:29:04	Anthony Farrugia (AUS)	2:31:29
2009	Shane Nankervis (AUS)	2:16:46	Matt Smith (NZL)	2:16:51	Rowan Walker (AUS)	2:21:04
2010	Rowan Walker (AUS)	2:20:18	Rowan Hooper (NZL)	2:22:05	Nathan Hartigan (AUS)	2:23:27
2011	Lee Troop (AUS)	2:15:45	Rowan Walker (AUS)	2:20:25	David Criniti (AUS)	2:20:55
2012	Jonathan Peters (AUS)	2:20:05	Rowan Walker (AUS)	2:21:19	Wondwosen Geleta (AUS)	2:26:17
2013	Rowan Walker (AUS)	2:23:50	Tony Payne (NZL)	2:27:25	John Dutton (AUS)	2:27:40
2014	Rowan Walker (AUS)	2:21:47	Alastair Stevenson (AUS)	2:23:48	Vladimir Shatrov (AUS)	2:24:45
2015	Jonathan Peters (AUS)	02:21:14	Rowan Walker (AUS)	2:25:32	Nic Van Raaphorst (AUS)	2:26:59
2016	Paul Martelletti (NZL)	2:18:57	Dave Ridley (NZL)	2:26:21	Dion Finocchiaro (AUS)	2:27:30
2017	Dave Ridley (NZL)	2:24:59	Charlie Boyle (AUS)	2:25:23	Ben MacCroan (AUS)	2:26:19

=== Men's Half Marathon ===
Year	Gold		Silver		Bronze	
2008	Michael Shelley (AUS)	1:02:41	Lee Troop (AUS)	1:02:57	Martin Dent (AUS)	1:03:49
2009	Michael Shelley (AUS)	1:02:10	Martin Dent (AUS)	1:02:16	Jeffrey Hunt (AUS)	1:02:44
2010	Jeffrey Hunt (AUS)	1:03:18	Martin Dent (AUS)	1:03:21	Anthony Haber (AUS)	1:04:35
2011	Jeffrey Hunt (AUS)	1:04:04	Peter Nowill (AUS)	1:06:24	Vlad Shatrov (AUS)	1:08:39
2012	Liam Adams (AUS)	1:03:28	Harry Summers (AUS)	1:03:34	Lee Troop (AUS)	1:05:34
2013	Martin Dent (AUS)	1:03:56	Benjamin Ashkettle (AUS)	1:04:12	Liam Adams (AUS)	1:04:49
2014	Brad Milosevic (AUS)	1:05:33	Josh Harris (AUS)	1:05:51	Aaron Pulford (NZL)	1:05:52

=== Women's Marathon ===
Year	Gold		Silver		Bronze	
2008	Shireen Crumpton (NZL)	2:38:16	Rina Hill (AUS)	2:45:59	Roxie Schmidt (AUS)	2:47:56
2009	Lauren Shelley (AUS)	2:42:22	Roxie Schmidt (AUS)	2:42:22	Rina Hill (AUS)	2:48:56
2010	Sarah McRae (AUS)	2:39:41	Shireen Crumpton (NZL)	2:41:21	Anita Keem (AUS)	2:48:06
2011	Roxie Fraser (AUS)	2:41:17	Michelle McAdam (AUS)	2:44:44	Kirsten Molloy (AUS)	2:46:32
2012	Sally Gibbs (NZL)	2:41:15	Anita Keem (AUS)	2:42:43	Alexandra Williams (NZL)	2:45:19
2013	Alexandra Williams (NZL)	2:41:30	Sally Gibbs (NZL)	2:42:59	Anita Keem (AUS)	2:45:39
2014	Tarli Bird (AUS)	2:43:58	Alexandra Williams (NZL)	2:45:21	Aarthi Venkatesan (AUS)	2:47:30

=== Women's Half Marathon ===
Year	Gold		Silver		Bronze	
2008	Rowan Marie Baird (NZL)	1:14:01	Eliza Stewart (AUS)	1:17:04	Susan Michelsson (AUS)	1:17:06
2009	Lisa Weightman (AUS)	1:10:42	Cassie Fien (AUS)	1:12:24	Shireen Crumpton (NZL)	1:14:05
2010	Lisa Weightman (AUS)	1:09:00	Cassie Fien (AUS)	1:11:45	Jessica Trengove (AUS)	1:12:48
2011	Lara Tamsett (AUS)	1:12:19	Jessica Trengove (AUS)	1:12:28	Abigail Bayley (AUS)	1:13:40
2012	Lisa Robertson (NZL)	1:14:22	Belinda Martin (AUS)	1:16:11	Tracey Austin (AUS)	1:17:59
2013	Nikki Chapple (AUS)	1:11:00	Jessica Trengove (AUS)	1:11:51	Nicki McFadzien (NZL)	1:15:13
2014	Milly Clark (AUS)	1:14:04	Sinead Diver (AUS)	1:14:25	Karinna Fyfe (AUS)	1:14:49
