= Gemechu =

Gemechu is a male given name of Ethiopian origin that may refer to:

- Gemechu Dida (born 1999), Ethiopian long-distance runner
- Gemechu Woyecha (born 1979), Ethiopian marathon runner formerly of Qatar
- Gemechu Kebede (born 1973), Ethiopian marathon runner who finished twelfth at the 1999 World Championships
- Shitaye Gemechu (born 1980), Ethiopian female marathon runner
- Lishan Dula Gemechu (born 1987), Ethiopian female marathon runner competing for Bahrain
