= Melbourne Marathon =

Annual race held in Melbourne, Australia

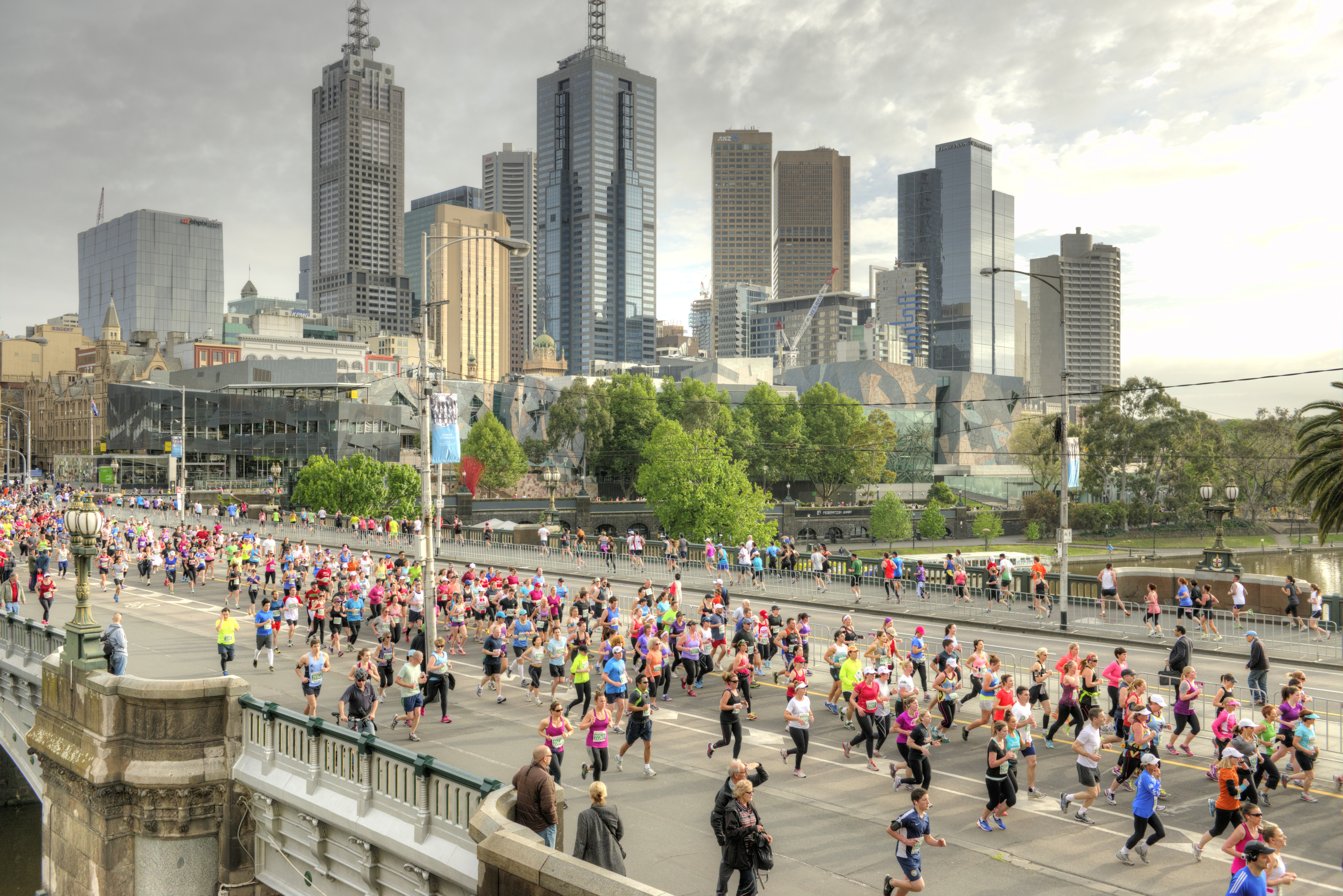
- Melbourne Marathon in 2013 at Princes Bridge
- Date: October
- Location: Melbourne, Australia
- Event type: Road
- Distance: Marathon
- Primary sponsor: Nike
- Established: 1978 (48 years ago)
- Course records: Men's: 2:09:10 (2026) (Kenya) Eliud Kipchoge; Women's: 2:25:19 (2018) (Australia) Sinead Diver
- Website: Melbourne Marathon
- Participants: 17717 (2026)

The Melbourne Marathon is an annual marathon that has taken place in Melbourne, Australia since 1978. It is the main race within the Melbourne Marathon Festival. The race starts at Batman Avenue and ends at the Melbourne Cricket Ground, going through the South of Melbourne over the traditional 42.195 km marathon distance. A total of 3328 competitors completed the 2008 race. Another 17,000 people participated in Half Marathon (21.1 km), 10 km and 5.5 km events.

The 2019 running of the marathon saw an Australian record of 7037 finishers, 1880 of whom were female (27%). In 1978 approximately 4% of the 1947 finishers were female.

The 2020 event was cancelled on 9 September due to the COVID-19 crisis. A virtual marathon was run for the period 5 to 13 December.

In September 2021 it was decided to postpone the 2021 event until 11 and 12 December. The marathon and half marathon were run on Sunday the 12th, starting an hour earlier to escape the heat. The shorter events were held on the afternoon of Saturday the 11th.

The 2022 event returned to October with all events being run on Sunday. There were 6215 finishers in the marathon.

The marathon was owned by IMG from 2006 until 2025, when ownership was transferred to MARI.

== Course ==
A variety of different courses have been used for the Melbourne Marathon. Since 2007 the event has started near the MCG and finished with a lap of the ground. The predominantly flat marathon course goes through scenic areas of Melbourne.

The 2026 course started at Batman Avenue, travelling South through St Kilda Road, going through St Kilda and around Albert Park Lake, before looping back to finish close to the start at the Melbourne Cricket Ground. It is normally run on the second Sunday in October.

== Past winners ==
Key: Course record Country's championship race

Edition	Year	Men's winner	Time (h:m:s)	Women's winner	Time (h:m:s)
1st	1978	Bill Scott (AUS)	2:21:04	Elizabeth Richards-Hassall (AUS)	2:53:38
2nd	1979	Andrew Lloyd (AUS)	2:26:44	Jane Kuchins (AUS)	3:12:35
3rd	1980	Andrew Lloyd (AUS)	2:17:37	Rosemary Longstaff (AUS)	2:46:16
4th	1981	Andrew Lloyd (AUS)	2:19:03	Jackie Turney-Cook (AUS)	2:42:12
5th	1982	Bill Rodgers (USA)	2:11:08	Sue King (USA)	2:37:57
6th	1983	Juma Ikangaa (TAN)	2:13:15	Rhonda Mallinder (AUS)	2:37:56
7th	1984	Juma Ikangaa (TAN)	2:15:31	Margaret Reddan (AUS)	2:43:40
8th	1985	Fred van der Vennet (BEL)	2:12:35	Margaret Reddan (AUS)	2:44:56
9th	1986	Richard Umberg (SUI)	2:17:21	Tani Ruckle (AUS)	2:36:06
10th	1987	Ric Sayre (USA)	2:14:16	Jackie Turney-Cook (AUS)	2:44:18
11th	1988	Thomas Hughes (IRL)	2:18:14	Coral Farr (AUS)	2:47:38
12th	1989	Takeshi So (JPN)	2:18:13	Colleen Stephens (AUS)	2:49:18
13th	1990	Russell Foley (AUS)	2:20:35	Alevtina Chasova (URS)	2:39:00
14th	1991	Victor Muzgovoi (URS)	2:17:02	Irina Petrova (URS)	2:39:57
15th	1992	Sławomir Gurny (POL)	2:16:04^{†}	Alena Peterková (TCH)	2:33:02^{†}
16th	1993	Jerry Modiga (RSA)	2:15:07	Dominique Rembert (FRA)	2:44:22
17th	1994	Manabu Kawagoe (JPN)	2:19:02	Winnie Ng (HKG)	2:47:37
18th	1995	Osamu Monoe (JPN)	2:17:19	Lynn Clayton (AUS)	2:38:50
19th	1996	Zerhun Gizaw (ETH)	2:22:40	Sylvia Rose (AUS)	2:41:53
20th	1997	Greg Lyons (AUS)	2:15:49	Tracey Newton (AUS)	2:48:32
21st	1998	Daniel Radebe (RSA)	2:12:48	Sherryn Rhodes (AUS)	2:37:56
22nd	1999	Michael McIntyre (AUS)	2:25:04	Susan Hobson (AUS)	2:33:27
23rd	2000	Jamie Harrison (AUS)	2:25:53	Nelly Marmy-Conus (AUS)	2:49:22
24th	2001	Todd Ingraham (AUS)	2:23:58	Samantha Hughes (AUS)	2:39:44
25th	2002	Phillip Sly (AUS)	2:22:28	Sherryn Rhodes (AUS)	2:47:08
26th	2003	Magnus Michelsson (AUS)	2:14:00	Loretta McGrath (AUS)	2:49:01
27th	2004	Magnus Michelsson (AUS)	2:26:51	Billinda Schipp (AUS)	2:54:01
28th	2005	Nick Harrison (AUS)	2:23:30	Sherryn Rhodes (AUS)	2:50:35
29th	2006	Kazunari Suzuki (JPN)	2:23:43	Karen Natoli-Barlow (AUS)	2:53:06
30th	2007	Rowan Walker (AUS)	2:19:16	Hanny Allston (AUS)	2:40:34
31st	2008	Asnake Fikadu (ETH)	2:17:43	Mai Tagami (JPN)	2:38:16
32nd	2009	Asnake Fikadu (ETH)	2:17:32	Lisa Flint (AUS)	2:34:08
33rd	2010	Japhet Kipkorir (KEN)	2:11:04	Mulu Seboka (ETH)	2:32:20
34th	2011	Japhet Kipkorir (KEN)	2:11:12	Irene Mogaka (KEN)	2:35:12
35th	2012	Jonathan Chesoo (KEN)	2:12:35	Lauren Shelley (AUS)	2:36:29
36th	2013	Dominic Ondoro (KEN)	2:10:47	Lisa Weightman (AUS)	2:26:05
37th	2014	Dominic Ondoro (KEN)	2:11:30	Nikki Chapple (AUS)	2:31:05
38th	2015	Brad Milosevic (AUS)	2:16:00	Jessica Trengove (AUS)	2:27:45
39th	2016	Thomas Do Canto (AUS)	2:20:53	Virginia Moloney (AUS)	2:34:27
40th	2017	Isaac Birir (KEN)	2:14:08	Celia Sullohern (AUS)	2:29:27
41st	2018	Liam Adams (AUS)	2:15:13	Sinead Diver (AUS)	2:25:19
42nd	2019	Isaac Birir (KEN)	2:16:31	Naomi Maiyo (KEN)	2:35:34
	2020	postponed due to coronavirus pandemic			
43rd	2021	Brett Robinson (AUS)	2:14:33	Milly Clark (AUS)	2:26:59
44th	2022	Timothy Kiplagat Ronoh (KEN)	2:09:12	Beatrice Cheptoo (KEN)	2:27:58
45th	2023	Reece Edwards (AUS)	2:14:35	Gemma Maini (AUS)	2:35:26
46th	2024	Jack Rayner (AUS)	2:11:49	Genevieve Gregson (AUS)	2:28:13
47th	2025	Jack Rayner (AUS)	2:15:02	Caitlin Adams (AUS)	2:30.26
48th	2026	Eliud Kipchoge (KEN)	2:09:10	Camille French (NZL)	2:28.25

- ^{†} = short course

== Spartans ==
=== Qualification ===
Spartans are runners who have completed 10 or more Melbourne Marathons and are recognised today by their distinctive green, gold, red, maroon or navy running singlets. Every Spartan has their own personalised race number. The singlet is worn with pride by all Spartans as a sign of their dedication to marathon running and the Melbourne Marathon in particular. Club records reflect over 1400 males and 150 females who have qualified as Spartans. Most come from Victoria but there are many from other states with at least two from Japan.

=== Legends and Hall of Fame members ===
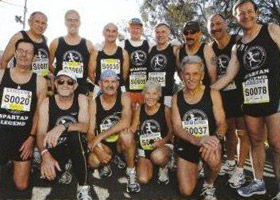
Spartan Legends prior to the 2007 Melbourne Marathon

Spartan Legends are a select group of runners who have completed every Melbourne Marathon since the beginning. After the 45th running there were three remaining Spartan Legends. Runners who have completed at least 30 marathons are eligible for the Melbourne Marathon Hall of Fame. The runners marked with an asterisk in the following list completed the first 30 marathons.

Name	Completed runs
Jim Hopkins	46
Peter Battrick *	37
Frank Biviano *	40
John Dobson	45
David Foskey	45
Neville Gardner *	41
Bruce Hargreaves	43
Manuel Karageorgiou * (deceased)	39
Peter Ryan *	37
Wayne Thompson	45
Roger Weinstein	43
Ian Campbell	42
Bryan Flegg	41
Chas Harcoan	44
Antony Martin	37
Dennis Nish	41
Richard Tann	37
Ken Bowes	40
Laurie Glover (deceased)	34
Conor McNeice	34
John Burt	35
John Dean *	33
Brian Gawne	32
Grayson Summers	42
Carlo Iovenitti (deceased)	37
Steven Lightowler	40
Jack Gubbins (deceased) *	30
Keith Hunter	30
Brian Walsh	34
Clarke Whitehand	30
Shirley Young (deceased) *	30
Hugh Creamer	33
Russell Harris	34
Con Zanetidis	36
Stephen Barker	36
John Kaparelis	34
Brett Thiele	32
Jim Yatomi-Clarke	34
Andy Moore	36
Peter Moore (deceased)	31
Duncan Bartley	34
Lorraine Allen	34
Eric Heine	34
Francis Kaszmarek	31
Trevor Marsh	31
Greg Payne	31
Jay Fleming	31
Ken Watt	31
Clarke Whitehand	31
Greg Moore	32

=== Wheelchair Spartans ===
The Melbourne Marathon has always included wheelchair entrants. Two have attained Spartan status: Dean Callow who has completed 12 and Ian Gainey who has now completed 31 races and was inducted into the Hall of Fame at the 2022 Annual General Meeting.
