= Bruce Hargreaves =

Australian marathon runner

Bruce "Digger" Hargreaves (born 1953) is an Australian amateur athlete, corporate speaker and businessperson. As of December 2021, he had completed 154 marathons and 45 ultramarathons.

Hargreaves is a Melbourne Marathon Spartan Legend, meaning that, along with four other runners, he has completed it every year since it began in 1978. He was the Australian Ambassador for the Comrades Marathon-A 90 km road race in South Africa, the world's largest Ultra Marathon from 2008 until 2018, and in 2018 he was appointed as one of the only two "Comrades Marathons Ambassadors at Large", and also in 2018 he was given the "Spirit of Comrades" award. Hargreaves has also completed the event seven times.

He has race directed, coordinated and advised numerous races and is currently the Race Director of both the Port Morseby and Tamborine Mountain Marathon and was a regular pacer in various marathons around both Australia and the world. A serious illness in 2018 slowed him down, so he volunteered as a "sweeper" at the Gold Coast Marathon and still regularly runs marathons.

Hargreaves has a personal best in the marathon of 2:47:02. He has run a sub-3 hour marathon nine times.
