= Nyla Carroll =

New Zealand long-distance runner

Nyla Jane Carroll (born 24 November 1965 in New Plymouth, Taranaki) is a retired long-distance runner from New Zealand, who represented her native country in the women's 10,000 metres at the 1996 Summer Olympics in Atlanta, United States. Carroll was also a member of the Kiwi team at the 1994 Commonwealth Games in Victoria, British Columbia, Canada, where she ended up in fifth place in the women's marathon race.

== Achievements ==
- All results regarding marathon, unless stated otherwise

Year	Competition	Venue	Position	Notes
Representing New Zealand
1994	Commonwealth Games	Victoria, British Columbia, Canada	5th	2:34:03
1995	World Championships	Gothenburg, Sweden	29th	2:50:25
2003	Canberra Marathon	Canberra, Australia	1st	2:38:56
