= Thomas Do Canto =

Australian long-distance runner

Personal information
- Born: 30 May 1986 (age 39)

Sport
- Country: Australia
- Sport: Long-distance running

Thomas Do Canto (born 30 May 1986) is an Australian long-distance runner and two-time national marathon champion.

In 2016, Do Canto made his marathon debut at the Melbourne Marathon, winning the race in a time of 2:20:53 and claiming the Australian national marathon title.

In 2024, he won his second national title at the Sydney Marathon, finishing as the first Australian in 2:17:53.

In 2017, Do Canto recorded a personal best of 2:14:59 at the Fukuoka Marathon, meeting the A-qualifying standard for the Commonwealth Games but narrowly missing selection.

In 2018, Do Canto represented Australia at the 2018 IAAF World Half Marathon Championships in Valencia, Spain, finishing 71st in the men's race.

Affectionately known as the "King of the Bay Run", Do Canto has a prolific record at the annual fun run held around Sydney’s Iron Cove. He has competed in at least six editions of the event, winning five times. He won his first official Bay Run at age 20 and began training around the course while attending Trinity Grammar School.
