= Melbourne Marathon Festival =

The Melbourne Marathon Festival has been held every year from 1978, except 2020. The festival is composed of the marathon, half-marathon, 10 km, 5.7 km, 4 km walk, and Kids 2.5 km races. Because of Covid-19 related restrictions, it was decided in September that the 2021 event would be postponed to December and split over two days. The shorter events will be held on the afternoon of Saturday 11 December and the marathon and half marathons will be held on Sunday the 12th, starting an hour earlier

The Festival celebrated its 30th birthday in 2007 with a new course which featured the Melbourne Cricket Ground (MCG) as both the starting point and finishing point. Over 20,000 competitors participated in the 2008 festival. The 2010 running of the marathon saw a record number of 5,026 finishers, and race records set for both men and women.

There was a virtual festival in 2020.

== 2009 5km and 10km run distance controversy ==
Competitors during the 2009 Melbourne Marathon

The event was marred and its reputation considerably tarnished in 2009 by the 5k and 10k events being considerably short, with runners calculating the distance for the 5 km run at about 4 km. On 14 October 2009, the organisers sent out an email to participants, acknowledging the error and stating that the distances for the 5 km and 10 km run were approximately 4.5 and 9.25 km respectively.

== The course ==
A variety of different courses have been used for the Melbourne Marathon Festival although the most common course has begun at Frankston and concluded at either Albert Park or at The Arts Centre on St. Kilda Rd. It is normally run on the second Sunday in October.

Since 2007 the event has started near the MCG and finished with a lap of the ground. The predominantly flat course goes through some of the most scenic areas of Melbourne. The marathon course skirts the Botanic Gardens and Albert park Lake with several kilometres on the road parallel to the beaches of Port Phillip Bay.

== Spartans and Spartan Legends ==
Spartans are runners who have completed 10 or more Melbourne Marathons. Spartans are recognized today by their distinctive green, gold, red, black, maroon or navy running singlets. Every Spartan has their own personalized race number. Club records reflect more than 1100 who have qualified as Spartans. Most come from Victoria but there are many from other states and one from Japan.

Spartan Legends are a select group of runners who have completed every Melbourne Marathon since the beginning. After the 42nd running there were only five remaining Spartan Legends.

The Melbourne Marathon has always included wheelchair entrants. Two have attained Spartan status: Ian Gainey who has completed 29 races and Dean Callow who has completed 11.

== See also ==
Melbourne Marathon
