= Rowan Walker =

Australian long-distance runner

Rowan Walker (born 12 January 1970 in Hobart, Australia) is an Australian distance athlete, twice holding the title of Australian Marathon Champion.

== Race career ==
Walker's first marathon was in 2000 when he entered Sydney’s Host City Marathon, a trial event prior to the 2000 Summer Olympics.

In 2007, he claimed his first marathon title by winning the Melbourne Marathon in a time of 2:19:16. During this period he was coached by Lee Troop.

In 2010, the Gold Coast Marathon simultaneously decided the men's and women's Australian Marathon Champions. As the first Australian athlete to finish, Walker thus claimed the title of Australian Marathon Champion. In 2014, the Gold Coast Marathon again served as the Australian Marathon Championship, and Walker was once more the first Australian home, in 11th place overall, to take the title. From 2008 to 2017, the Oceania Marathon and Half Marathon Championships were also decided at the Gold Coast Marathon, with Walker claiming a top three position in the Oceania marathon championship for eight consecutive years from 2008.

At the 2010 Melbourne Marathon, Walker completed a personal best marathon time of 2:18:01, at the age of 40. This set a race record for the men's 40–44 age group.

Walker has also placed first in the Auckland Marathon (2012) and Canberra Marathon (2011, 2013, 2015 and 2016).

Walker has participated in a number of ultramarathon events, including the Kepler Challenge. In 2012, Walker was the first solo runner home in the inaugural Surf Coast Century, a 100 km ultramarathon set around Anglesea, Victoria. He has also competed in the Duathlon World Championships and the Ironman Australia event in Port Macquarie.
