= Marnie Ponton =

Australian long-distance runner

Personal information
- Born: 16 March 1984 (age 42)

Sport
- Country: Australia
- Sport: Long-distance running
Medal record
Australian Athletics Championships
Gold medal – first place	2004 Sydney	3000 m steeplechase

Marnie Ponton (born 16 March 1984) is an Australian long-distance runner. She competed in the senior women's race at the 2019 IAAF World Cross Country Championships. She finished in 44th place.

In 2004, she won the gold medal in the women's 3000 metres steeplechase event at the 2003–04 Australian Athletics Championships held in Sydney, Australia.

In 2018, she competed at the inaugural Commonwealth Half Marathon Championships.

In 2022, she won the Canberra Marathon.
