= Gerard Barrett (footballer) =

Australian rules footballer

Personal information
- Full name: Gerard Michael Barrett
- Born: 15 September 1925; Geelong West, Victoria
- Died: 15 October 2000 (aged 75)
- Height: 173 cm (5 ft 8 in)
- Weight: 71 kg (157 lb)

Playing career^{1}
Years	Club	Games (Goals)
1944	Geelong	6 (1)
- ^{1} Playing statistics correct to the end of 1944.

Gerard Michael Barrett (15 September 1925 – 15 October 2000) was an Australian rules football player who played six games for Geelong Football Club in 1944.

Barrett made six appearances for Geelong in 1944 while serving as a cook in the Royal Australian Air Force during World War II.
