= Joshua Lodge =

Australian high jumper

Joshua Lodge (born 14 September 1981), is an Australian athlete who competes in the high jump. Joshua won the 2003 Australian Championships. He has a personal best of 2.22 metres (7.3 ft).
