= Nic O'Brien =

New Zealand hurdler

Nic O'Brien (born 1 January 1980) is a former New Zealand hurdler. He held the national record over the 400m hurdles from 2003 until 2014. O'Brien studied at Villanova University.

== Personal bests ==
Distance	Time	Place	Date
400 m hurdles	49.90	Connecticut	2003
