= Brad Milosevic =

Australian long-distance runner (born 1989)

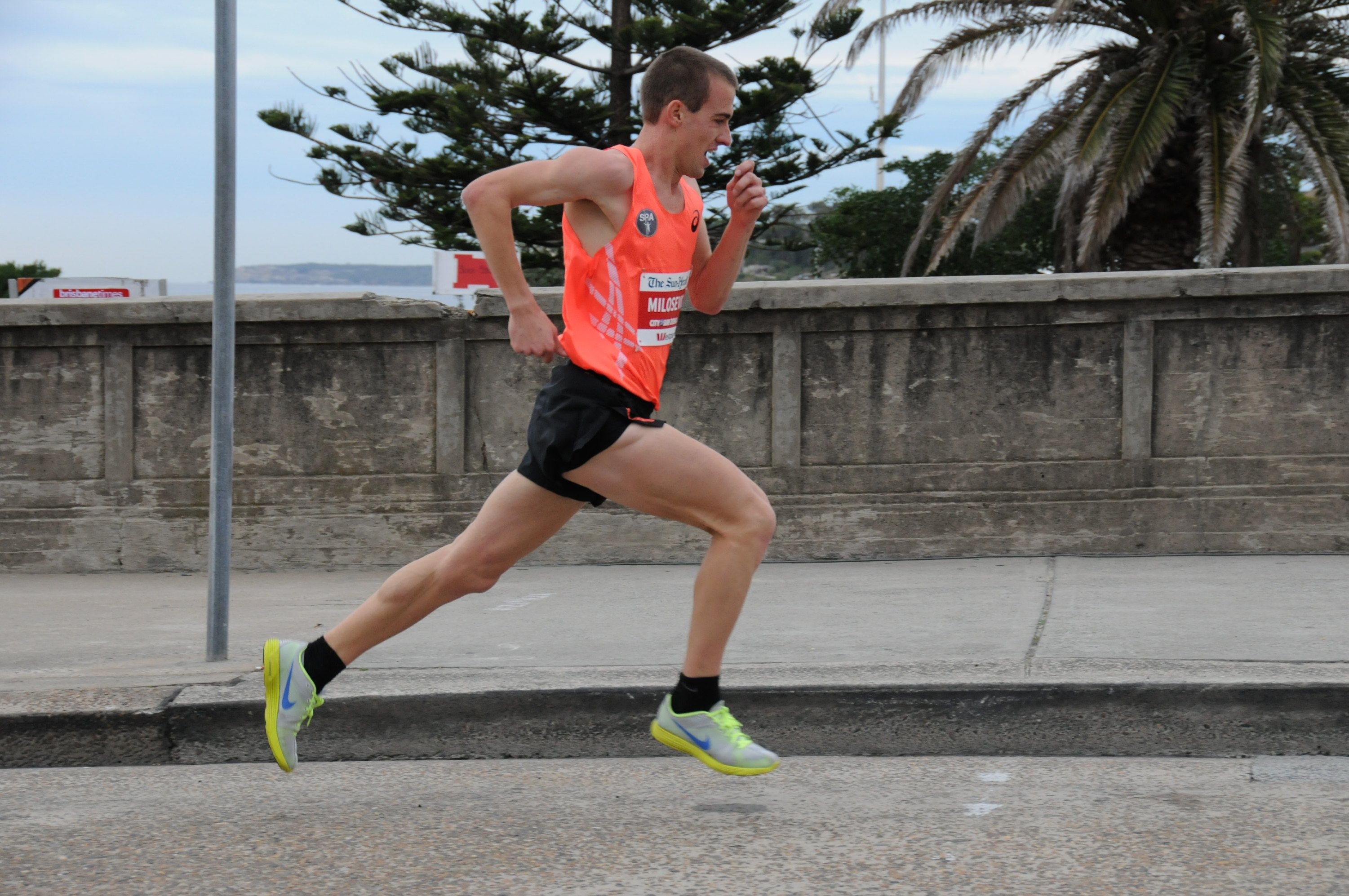
- Milosevic in "City2Surf 2014"

Personal information
- Nationality: Australian
- Born: 26 May 1989 (age 37) Sydney, Australia

Sport
- Sport: Track, long-distance running
- Events: 5000 meters, 10,000 meters, marathon, half marathon

Achievements and titles
- Personal bests: 5000 meters: 14:08.99; 10,000 meters: 29:44.84; Marathon: 2:16:00
- Updated on 26 November 2015

Brad Milosevic (born 26 May 1989) is an Australian long-distance runner. He won the half marathon at the Oceania Marathon and Half Marathon Championships (2014) in 1:05:33. and the 2014 NSW Short Course Cross Country race. Major Titles & International CV: 2017 Nagoya City Half Marathon, Japan- Champion, 2016 NSW State Open Championships, 10,000m -Champion, 2015 Melbourne Marathon- Champion, 2015 Sydney City 2 Surf - Champion 2015 NSW State long-course & short-course XC Championships -(2nd) 2015 Nagoya City half marathon, Japan- Champion, 2014 Blackmores Sydney Australian half-marathon -Champion, 2014 Gold Coast Oceania half-marathon- Champion, 2014 Sydney City 2 Surf- (2nd), 2014 NSW State 5,000m - Champion, 2014 NSW State short course Cross-Country- Champion He was born in 1989 and grew up in Kings Langley near Sydney.

== Running career ==
Milosevic rose in Australia's running scene with Girraween Athletics Club. In 2014, he came second in the City2Surf (Sydney). On 9 August 2015, he won the 2015 edition of the City2Surf race. On 18 October 2015, he fulfilled the Olympic "B" standard when he finished the 2015 Melbourne Marathon in 2:16:00.

In 2017, Milosevic competed in the men's marathon at the World Championships in Athletics held in London, placing 60th in the time of 2:25:14.
