= Magnus Michelsson =

Australian marathon runner

Medal record

Melbourne Marathon
Silver medal – second place	1997 Melbourne Marathon	
Gold medal – first place	2003 Melbourne Marathon	
Gold medal – first place	2004 Melbourne Marathon	

Canberra Marathon
Bronze medal – third place	2002 Canberra Marathon	
Silver medal – second place	2006 Canberra Marathon	
Gold medal – first place	2007 Canberra Marathon	

Canberra Half Marathon
Gold medal – first place	2005 Canberra Half Marathon	

Magnus Leif Michelsson (born 4 September 1968) is an Australian marathon runner. He won the Melbourne Marathon in 2003 and 2004.

His Melbourne Marathon winning margin in 2003 is the biggest male winning margin in the history of the race.
