= Jeff Hunt (athlete) =

Australian long-distance runner

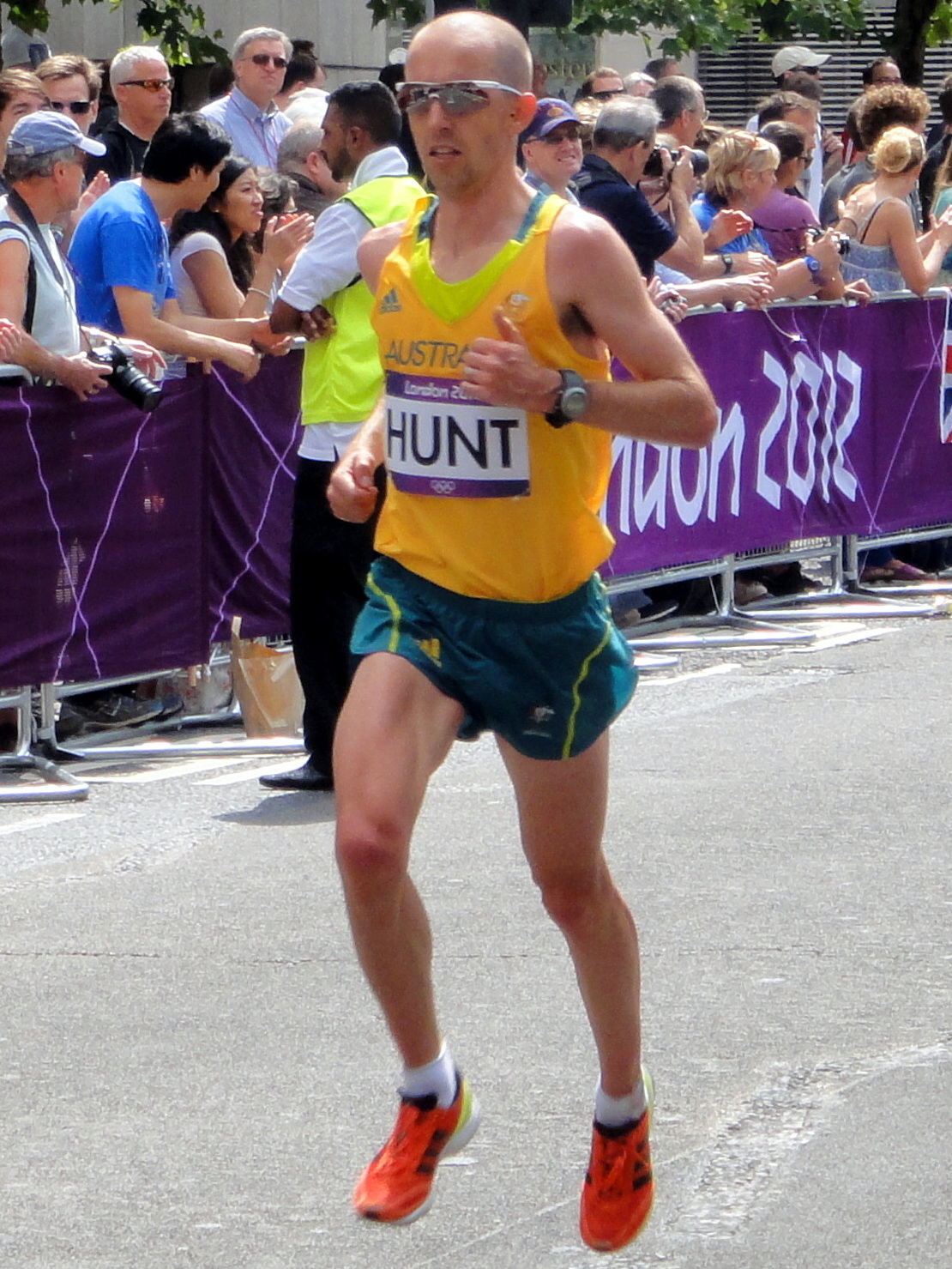
- Hunt in the marathon at the 2012 Olympics in London

Personal information
- Born: 24 July 1982 (age 43) Fairfield, New South Wales
- Height: 1.72 m (5 ft 7 1/2 in)
- Weight: 58 kg (128 lb)

Sport
- Country: Australia
- Sport: Athletics
- Event: Marathon
Medal record
Men's athletics
Representing Australia
Oceania Championships
Gold medal – first place	2010 Cairns	5000 m
- Updated on 24 April 2013

Jeff Hunt is an Australian long-distance runner. At the 2012 Summer Olympics, he competed in the Men's marathon, finishing in 63rd place.

== Achievements ==
Year	Competition	Venue	Position	Event	Notes
Representing Australia
2010	Oceania Championships	Cairns, Australia	1st	5000 m	14:41.97 min CR
