= Gemechu Woyecha =

Australian long-distance runner

Gemechu Woyecha (born 3 February 1979) is an Australian long-distance runner who specializes in the marathon.

He was born in Ethiopia, and also represented Qatar formerly, under the name Rashid Khaled Jamal. He competed in the 2000 Olympic marathon, but did not finish the race. He later defected to Australia. In his new home country he won the 2004 Gold Coast Marathon.

His personal best time is 2:14:50 hours, achieved in 2001. As an Australian citizen his best mark is 2:15.27 hours, achieved when he finished eighth at the 2008 Nagano Marathon.

== Achievements ==
- All results regarding marathon, unless stated otherwise

Year	Competition	Venue	Position	Notes
Representing Qatar
2000	Olympic Games	Sydney, Australia	—	DNF
