= Gerard Barrett (runner) =

Australian long-distance runner

Gerard Barrett (born 31 December 1956) is an Australian former long-distance runner who competed in the 1980 Summer Olympics.
