= Athletics at the 2021 Summer World University Games – Men's 100 metres =

The men's 100 metres event at the 2021 Summer World University Games was held on 1 and 2 August 2023 at the Shuangliu Sports Centre Stadium in Chengdu, China.

== Medalists ==
| Gold | Silver | Bronze |
|---|---|---|
| Kadrian Goldson; Jamaica | Shaun Maswanganyi; South Africa | Chen Guanfeng; China |

== Results ==
=== Round 1 ===
Qualification: First 2 in each heat (Q) and the next 8 fastest (q) advance to semifinal.

==== Heat 1 ====
| Rank | Lane | Athlete | Nation | Time | Notes |
|---|---|---|---|---|---|
| 1 | 3 | Chen Guanfeng | China | 10.37 | Q |
| 2 | 8 | Kayhan Özer | Turkey | 10.38 | Q |
| 3 | 6 | Lee Jae-seong | South Korea | 10.50 | q |
| 4 | 5 | Aktham Albo | Iraq | 10.97 | |
| 5 | 7 | Leonardo de Oliveira | Brazil | 10.97 | |
| 6 | 2 | Santos Okabo | Uganda | 11.08 | PB |
| 7 | 9 | Mansoor Al-Saadi | Oman | 11.39 | |
| — | 4 | Issa Maïga | Mali | DNS | |
| Source: | | | | Wind: -0.4 m/s | |

==== Heat 2 ====
| Rank | Lane | Athlete | Nation | Time | Notes |
|---|---|---|---|---|---|
| 1 | 9 | Thuto Masasa | Botswana | 10.40 | Q |
| 2 | 6 | Joshua Azzopardi | Australia | 10.50 | Q |
| 3 | 7 | Lin Yu-sian | Chinese Taipei | 10.53 | q |
| 4 | 3 | Patryk Wykrota | Poland | 10.64 | |
| 5 | 4 | Hassan Al-Absi | Saudi Arabia | 10.85 | |
| 6 | 8 | Tamer Saleh | Lebanon | 10.88 | |
| 7 | 5 | Patrick Banda | Zambia | 11.32 | |
| — | 2 | Salim Al-Jadeedi | Oman | DQ | TR16.8 |
| Source: | | | | Wind: -1.2 m/s | |

==== Heat 3 ====
| Rank | Lane | Athlete | Nation | Time | Notes |
|---|---|---|---|---|---|
| 1 | 4 | Shaun Maswanganyi | South Africa | 10.45 | Q |
| 2 | 6 | Felix Frühn | Germany | 10.57 | Q |
| 3 | 7 | James Williamson | United States | 10.64 | |
| 4 | 8 | Lalu Bhoi | India | 10.77 | |
| 5 | 2 | Rocky Ramos | Philippines | 11.14 | |
| 6 | 3 | Muhammad bin Ismail | Malaysia | 11.21 | |
| — | 5 | Carlos Morais | Cape Verde | DNS | |
| Source: | | | | Wind: -1.6 m/s | |

==== Heat 4 ====
| Rank | Lane | Athlete | Nation | Time | Notes |
|---|---|---|---|---|---|
| 1 | 9 | Deng Zhijian | China | 10.47 | Q |
| 2 | 6 | Barnabas Aggerh | Ghana | 10.49 | Q |
| 3 | 5 | Chen Wen-pu | Chinese Taipei | 10.50 | q |
| 4 | 8 | Gianno Peddy | South Africa | 10.50 | q |
| 5 | 2 | Jacob Vaula | Norway | 10.59 | q |
| 6 | 7 | Murtadha Al-Kemawee | Iraq | 10.68 | |
| 7 | 4 | Rico Adith | Indonesia | 10.75 | |
| 8 | 3 | Ian-Gheorghe Vieru | Moldova | 11.06 | |
| Source: | | | | Wind: -0.3 m/s | |

==== Heat 5 ====
| Rank | Lane | Athlete | Nation | Time | Notes |
|---|---|---|---|---|---|
| 1 | 6 | Shota Nakamura | Japan | 10.47 | Q |
| 2 | 8 | Jaylan Washington | United States | 10.57 | Q |
| 3 | 9 | Noelex Holder | Guyana | 10.57 | q |
| 4 | 7 | Wahyu Setiawan | Indonesia | 10.61 | q |
| 5 | 5 | Vitaliy Zems | Kazakhstan | 10.65 | |
| 6 | 4 | Peter Masaba | Uganda | 10.96 | |
| 7 | 3 | Amadu Kondeh | Sierra Leone | 11.62 | |
| 8 | 2 | Lee Hong Kit | Hong Kong | 11.63 | |
| Source: | | | | Wind: -0.7 m/s | |

==== Heat 6 ====
| Rank | Lane | Athlete | Nation | Time | Notes |
|---|---|---|---|---|---|
| 1 | 7 | Mateusz Siuda | Poland | 10.34 | Q |
| 2 | 3 | Aleksandar Askovic | Germany | 10.55 | Q |
| 3 | 4 | Mustafa Ay | Turkey | 10.58 | q |
| 4 | 2 | Chan Kin Wa | Macau | 10.68 (.676) | |
| 4 | 8 | Jakub Nemec | Slovakia | 10.68 (.676) | |
| 6 | 6 | Almat Tulebayev | Kazakhstan | 10.85 | |
| 7 | 9 | Narindra Rafidimalala | Madagascar | 11.07 | |
| 8 | 5 | Inoke Waisele | Fiji | 11.08 | |
| Source: | | | | Wind: +0.4 m/s | |

==== Heat 7 ====
| Rank | Lane | Athlete | Nation | Time | Notes |
|---|---|---|---|---|---|
| 1 | 2 | Lee Jun-hyeok | South Korea | 10.44 | Q |
| 2 | 7 | Even Meinseth | Norway | 10.52 | Q |
| 3 | 8 | Nurain Kola Musa | Nigeria | 10.63 | |
| 4 | 9 | Naoki Inoue | Japan | 10.66 | |
| 5 | 4 | Shak Kam Ching | Hong Kong | 10.69 | |
| 6 | 5 | Joshua Chua | Singapore | 10.82 | |
| 7 | 6 | Jules Niteka | Burundi | 11.54 | |
| — | 3 | Sittiphon Donpritee | Thailand | DNS | |
| Source: | | | | Wind: -1.2 m/s | |

==== Heat 8 ====
| Rank | Lane | Athlete | Nation | Time | Notes |
|---|---|---|---|---|---|
| 1 | 5 | Kadrian Goldson | Jamaica | 10.48 | Q |
| 2 | 7 | Christopher Ius | Australia | 10.63 | Q |
| 3 | 4 | Amlan Borgohain | India | 10.64 | |
| 4 | 2 | Andrea Federici | Italy | 10.65 | |
| 5 | 3 | Mohamed Thaqif | Malaysia | 10.84 | |
| 6 | 6 | Isaac Joseph | Haiti | 10.85 | |
| 7 | 8 | Trần Quang Toản | Vietnam | 12.10 | |
| Source: | | | | Wind: -2.0 m/s | |

=== Semi-finals ===
Qualification: First 2 in each heat (Q) and the next 2 fastest (q) advance to final.

==== Heat 1 ====
| Rank | Lane | Athlete | Nation | Time | Notes |
|---|---|---|---|---|---|
| 1 | 4 | Deng Zhijian | China | 10.29 | Q |
| 2 | 5 | Mateusz Siuda | Poland | 10.31 | Q |
| 3 | 7 | Shota Nakamura | Japan | 10.34 (.335) | |
| 4 | 3 | Gianno Peddy | South Africa | 10.34 (.339) | |
| 5 | 2 | Lee Jae-seong | South Korea | 10.39 | |
| 6 | 8 | Aleksandar Askovic | Germany | 10.43 | |
| 7 | 6 | Even Meinseth | Norway | 10.43 | |
| 8 | 9 | Wahyu Setiawan | Indonesia | 10.48 | SB |
| Source: | | | | Wind: +0.9 m/s | |

==== Heat 2 ====
| Rank | Lane | Athlete | Nation | Time | Notes |
|---|---|---|---|---|---|
| 1 | 6 | Kadrian Goldson | Jamaica | 10.04 | Q |
| 2 | 4 | Shaun Maswanganyi | South Africa | 10.12 | Q |
| 3 | 5 | Chen Guanfeng | China | 10.16 | q, SB |
| 4 | 3 | Felix Frühn | Germany | 10.30 | q, PB |
| 5 | 7 | Joshua Azzopardi | Australia | 10.31 | |
| 6 | 8 | Chen Wen-pu | Chinese Taipei | 10.32 | PB |
| 7 | 2 | Mustafa Ay | Turkey | 10.45 | |
| 8 | 9 | Noelex Holder | Guyana | 10.58 | |
| Source: | | | | Wind: +1.2 m/s | |

==== Heat 3 ====
| Rank | Lane | Athlete | Nation | Time | Notes |
|---|---|---|---|---|---|
| 1 | 9 | Lin Yu-sian | Chinese Taipei | 10.29 | Q, PB |
| 2 | 7 | Kayhan Özer | Turkey | 10.30 | Q |
| 3 | 5 | Lee Jun-hyeok | South Korea | 10.32 | SB |
| 4 | 3 | Christopher Ius | Australia | 10.39 (.384) | |
| 5 | 6 | Thuto Masasa | Botswana | 10.39 (.390) | |
| 6 | 2 | Jacob Vaula | Norway | 10.41 | |
| 7 | 4 | Barnabas Aggerh | Ghana | 10.49 | SB |
| 8 | 8 | Jaylan Washington | United States | 10.52 | |
| Source: | | | | Wind: +0.5 m/s | |

=== Final ===
| Rank | Lane | Athlete | Nation | Time | Notes |
|---|---|---|---|---|---|
| 1st place, gold medalist(s) | 4 | Kadrian Goldson | Jamaica | 10.04 | |
| 2nd place, silver medalist(s) | 5 | Shaun Maswanganyi | South Africa | 10.06 | |
| 3rd place, bronze medalist(s) | 2 | Chen Guanfeng | China | 10.17 | |
| 4 | 6 | Lin Yu-sian | Chinese Taipei | 10.24 | PB |
| 5 | 3 | Mateusz Siuda | Poland | 10.24 | PB |
| 6 | 9 | Felix Frühn | Germany | 10.25 | PB |
| 7 | 8 | Kayhan Özer | Turkey | 10.25 | SB |
| 8 | 7 | Deng Zhijian | China | 10.28 | |
| Source: | | | | Wind: +1.2 m/s | |
