= Athletics at the 2021 Summer World University Games – Men's 200 metres =

The men's 200 metres event at the 2021 Summer World University Games was held on 3 and 4 August 2023 at the Shuangliu Sports Centre Stadium in Chengdu, China.

== Medalists ==
Gold	Silver	Bronze
Tsebo Matsoso; South Africa	Yudai Nishi; Japan	Amlan Borgohain; India

== Results ==
=== Round 1 ===
Qualification: First 2 in each heat (Q) and the next 8 fastest (q) advance to semifinal.

==== Heat 1 ====
Rank	Lane	Athlete	Nation	Time	Notes
1	5	Andrea Federici	Italy	20.68	Q
2	2	Łukasz Żok	Poland	21.26	Q
3	3	Murtadha Al-Kemawee	Iraq	21.65	PB
4	6	Jonathan Nyepa	Malaysia	21.76	
5	7	Patrick Banda	Zambia	22.57	PB
—	1	Saliou Seck	Senegal	DNS	
—	4	Even Meinseth	Norway	DNS	
Source:				Wind: +0.6 m/s	

==== Heat 2 ====
Rank	Lane	Athlete	Nation	Time	Notes
1	5	Ján Volko	Slovakia	20.96	Q
2	8	Batuhan Altıntaş	Turkey	21.17	Q
3	4	Isaac Joseph	Haiti	21.61	
4	3	Son Ji-won	South Korea	21.69	
5	1	Shimar Velloza	Guyana	22.93	
6	7	Faisal Al-Saka	Saudi Arabia	23.32	
7	2	James Manamugabe	Burundi	24.18	
—	6	Joshua Azzopardi	Australia	DNS	
Source:				Wind: -0.2 m/s	

==== Heat 3 ====
Rank	Lane	Athlete	Nation	Time	Notes
1	3	Amlan Borgohain	India	21.00	Q
2	7	Song Yu-jun	Chinese Taipei	21.25	Q
3	1	Keishon Franklin	United States	21.34	q
4	4	Marizuk Shaibu	Ghana	21.84	
5	2	Ian-Gheorghe Vieru	Moldova	21.91	
6	6	Mak Chun Ho	Hong Kong	22.20	
7	5	Salim Al-Jadeedi	Oman	22.58	
Source:				Wind: +0.2 m/s	

==== Heat 4 ====
Rank	Lane	Athlete	Nation	Time	Notes
1	2	Christopher Ius	Australia	21.01	Q
2	5	Bradley Lestrade	Switzerland	21.13	Q
3	4	Mohammad Jahir Rayhan	Bangladesh	21.34	q
4	1	Wallace Aflamah	Ghana	21.45	
5	3	Vong Ka In	Macau	21.85	
6	7	Aktham Albo	Iraq	22.16	
7	6	Carlos Morais	Cape Verde	22.44	
Source:				Wind: +1.3 m/s	

==== Heat 5 ====
Rank	Lane	Athlete	Nation	Time	Notes
1	1	Tsebo Matsoso	South Africa	20.74	Q
2	2	Aoi Inage	Japan	20.84	Q
3	3	Sui Gaofei	China	20.96	q
4	7	Phenyo Majama	Botswana	21.46	
5	4	Leonardo De Oliveira	Brazil	21.75	
6	6	Ryan Praharsh	Singapore	21.97	
7	5	Sharif Olipa	Uganda	22.44	
—	8	Amadu Kondeh	Sierra Leone	DNS	
Source:				Wind: +1.1 m/s	

==== Heat 6 ====
Rank	Lane	Athlete	Nation	Time	Notes
1	2	Yan Haibin	China	21.05	Q
2	3	Felix Frühn	Germany	21.28	Q
3	1	João Falcão	Brazil	21.34	q
4	7	Muhammad Aqil Yasmin	Malaysia	21.87	
5	5	Almat Tulebayev	Kazakhstan	22.01	
6	6	Virupakshappa Shashikantha	India	22.17	
—	4	Remigio Santander	Equatorial Guinea	DNS	
Source:				Wind: +0.2 m/s	

==== Heat 7 ====
Rank	Lane	Athlete	Nation	Time	Notes
1	7	Eckhart Potgieter	South Africa	20.82	Q
2	2	Wu Yen-ming	Chinese Taipei	20.84	Q
3	1	Yudai Nishi	Japan	20.85	q
4	3	Lee Jae-seong	South Korea	21.20	q
5	6	Noelex Holder	Guyana	21.33	q
6	5	Tamer Saleh	Lebanon	21.78	
7	8	Peter Masaba	Uganda	22.44	
—	4	Trần Quang Toản	Vietnam	DNS	
Source:				Wind: -0.1 m/s	

==== Heat 8 ====
Rank	Lane	Athlete	Nation	Time	Notes
1	7	James Williamson	United States	21.06	Q
2	2	Łukasz Żak	Poland	21.07	Q
3	6	Vitaliy Zems	Kazakhstan	21.39	q
4	4	Jakub Nemec	Slovakia	21.44	
5	1	Ivan Galuşco	Moldova	21.56	
6	5	Leung San Lok	Hong Kong	22.11	
7	3	Chantivea Yatpitou	Cambodia	22.65	
—	8	Hervé Cubahiro	Burundi	DQ	TR16.8
Source:				Wind: +1.6 m/s	

=== Semifinal ===
Qualification: First 2 in each heat (Q) and the next 2 fastest (q) advance to final.

==== Heat 1 ====
Rank	Lane	Athlete	Nation	Time	Notes
1	4	Yudai Nishi	Japan	20.43	Q, PB
2	7	Yan Haibin	China	20.63	Q, SB
3	6	Andrea Federici	Italy	20.70	q
4	5	Christopher Ius	Australia	20.94	
5	2	Lee Jae-seong	South Korea	20.97	SB
6	8	Batuhan Altıntaş	Turkey	20.99	
7	3	Bradley Lestrade	Switzerland	21.12	
8	1	Vitaliy Zems	Kazakhstan	21.37	
Source:				Wind: +0.9 m/s	

==== Heat 2 ====
Rank	Lane	Athlete	Nation	Time	Notes
1	6	Tsebo Matsoso	South Africa	20.45	Q
2	7	Amlan Borgohain	India	20.57	Q, SB
3	4	Sui Gaofei	China	20.78	SB
4	8	Łukasz Żak	Poland	20.80	PB
5	1	Noelex Holder	Guyana	21.04	PB
6	3	Song Yu-jun	Chinese Taipei	21.18	
7	5	James Williamson	United States	21.40	
8	2	Mohammad Jahir Rayhan	Bangladesh	21.48	
Source:				Wind: +1.6 m/s	

==== Heat 3 ====
Rank	Lane	Athlete	Nation	Time	Notes
1	6	Wu Yen-ming	Chinese Taipei	20.58	Q, PB
2	7	Ján Volko	Slovakia	20.59	Q
3	8	Aoi Inage	Japan	20.64	q, PB
4	5	Eckhart Potgieter	South Africa	20.70	PB
5	4	Łukasz Żok	Poland	20.75	PB
6	3	Felix Frühn	Germany	20.98	
7	2	Keishon Franklin	United States	21.15	
8	1	João Falcão	Brazil	21.18	SB
Source:				Wind: +1.1 m/s	

=== Final ===
Rank	Lane	Athlete	Nation	Time	Notes
1st place, gold medalist(s)	6	Tsebo Matsoso	South Africa	20.36	
2nd place, silver medalist(s)	7	Yudai Nishi	Japan	20.46	
3rd place, bronze medalist(s)	3	Amlan Borgohain	India	20.55	SB
4	4	Ján Volko	Slovakia	20.66	
5	8	Yan Haibin	China	20.67	
6	5	Wu Yen-ming	Chinese Taipei	20.70	
7	1	Andrea Federici	Italy	20.79	
8	2	Aoi Inage	Japan	21.10	
Source:				Wind: +0.5 m/s	
