= Athletics at the 2021 Summer World University Games – Men's 400 metres =

The men's 400 metres event at the 2021 Summer World University Games was held on 1, 2 and 3 August 2023 at the Shuangliu Sports Centre Stadium in Chengdu, China.

== Medalists ==
| Gold | Silver | Bronze |
|---|---|---|
| João Coelho; Portugal | Reece Holder; Australia | Mihai Dringo; Romania |

== Results ==
=== Round 1 ===
Qualification: First 3 in each heat (Q) and the next 6 fastest (q) advance to semifinal.

==== Heat 1 ====
| Rank | Lane | Athlete | Nation | Time | Notes |
|---|---|---|---|---|---|
| 1 | 6 | Reece Holder | Australia | 46.10 | Q |
| 2 | 2 | Umar Osman | Malaysia | 46.33 | Q, PB |
| 3 | 4 | Sewekan Thovoethin | Nigeria | 46.68 | Q, PB |
| 4 | 8 | İlyas Çanakcı | Turkey | 47.40 | q |
| 5 | 3 | Calvin Quek | Singapore | 47.41 | q |
| 6 | 5 | Joseph Taylor | United States | 48.41 | |
| 7 | 7 | Shimar Velloza | Guyana | 51.45 | |

==== Heat 2 ====
| Rank | Lane | Athlete | Nation | Time | Notes |
|---|---|---|---|---|---|
| 1 | 6 | Kenki Imaizumi | Japan | 47.23 | Q |
| 2 | 8 | José Elizondo | Costa Rica | 47.58 | Q |
| 3 | 3 | Kubilay Ençü | Turkey | 47.59 | Q |
| 4 | 4 | Yefim Tarassov | Kazakhstan | 47.68 | |
| 5 | 2 | Ivan Galuşca | Moldova | 47.81 | |
| 6 | 7 | Li Xinwang | China | 50.11 | |
| — | 5 | Sujan Shrestha | Nepal | DNS | |

==== Heat 3 ====
| Rank | Lane | Athlete | Nation | Time | Notes |
|---|---|---|---|---|---|
| 1 | 5 | Mihai Dringo | Romania | 46.85 | Q |
| 2 | 7 | Mateusz Rzeźniczak | Poland | 46.98 | Q |
| 3 | 8 | Nhlanhla Maseko | South Africa | 47.21 | Q |
| 4 | 3 | Phenyo Majama | Botswana | 47.47 | q |
| 5 | 4 | Emmanuel Dukpe | Ghana | 47.66 | |
| 6 | 2 | Nitin Kumar | India | 48.31 | |
| — | 6 | Moses Chileshe | Zambia | DQ | TR17.4.3 |

==== Heat 4 ====
| Rank | Lane | Athlete | Nation | Time | Notes |
|---|---|---|---|---|---|
| 1 | 5 | João Coelho | Portugal | 46.83 | Q |
| 2 | 4 | Tjaart van der Walt | South Africa | 47.21 | Q |
| 3 | 7 | Joo Seung-kyun | South Korea | 47.26 | Q |
| 4 | 3 | El Hadji Soumaré | Senegal | 47.28 | q |
| 5 | 2 | Thiruben Thana | Singapore | 47.33 | q |
| 6 | 1 | Fredrik Øvereng | Norway | 47.46 | q |
| 7 | 8 | Justin Eyit | Uganda | 49.29 | |
| — | 6 | Hamad Alyahyaee | United Arab Emirates | DNS | |

==== Heat 5 ====
| Rank | Lane | Athlete | Nation | Time | Notes |
|---|---|---|---|---|---|
| 1 | 4 | Naohiro Jinushi | Japan | 46.43 | Q |
| 2 | 5 | Zhou Haowen | China | 47.40 | Q |
| 3 | 3 | Mikhail Litvin | Kazakhstan | 47.49 | Q |
| 4 | 6 | Theerthesh Shetty | India | 49.01 | |
| 5 | 2 | Y.K.S.T. Al-Malki | Oman | 52.22 | |
| — | 7 | Adam Łukomski | Poland | DNF | |
| — | 8 | Mouatez Sikiou | Algeria | DQ | TR17.4.3 |

==== Heat 6 ====
| Rank | Lane | Athlete | Nation | Time | Notes |
|---|---|---|---|---|---|
| 1 | 2 | Keishon Franklin | United States | 47.24 | Q |
| 2 | 6 | João Falcão | Brazil | 47.50 | Q |
| 3 | 4 | Godfrey Chanwengo | Uganda | 47.72 | Q |
| 4 | 7 | Israel Anane Domeh | Ghana | 48.35 | |
| 5 | 5 | Lee Do-ha | South Korea | 48.77 | |
| 6 | 8 | Billy Ingabire | Burundi | 51.84 | |
| 7 | 1 | James Manamugabe | Burundi | 52.09 | |
| — | 3 | Abdul Waify Roslan | Malaysia | DQ | TR17.4.3 |

=== Semifinal ===
Qualification: First 2 in each heat (Q) and the next 2 fastest (q) advance to final.

==== Heat 1 ====
| Rank | Lane | Athlete | Nation | Time | Notes |
|---|---|---|---|---|---|
| 1 | 6 | João Coelho | Portugal | 46.60 | Q |
| 2 | 4 | Mihai Dringo | Romania | 46.90 | Q |
| 3 | 5 | Tjaart van der Walt | South Africa | 47.17 | |
| 4 | 3 | Joo Seung-kyun | South Korea | 47.39 | |
| 5 | 7 | Zhou Haowen | China | 47.41 | |
| 6 | 2 | İlyas Çanakcı | Turkey | 47.42 | |
| — | 1 | Calvin Quek | Singapore | DNF | |
| — | 8 | Mikhail Litvin | Kazakhstan | DQ | TR16.8 |

==== Heat 2 ====
| Rank | Lane | Athlete | Nation | Time | Notes |
|---|---|---|---|---|---|
| 1 | 4 | Naohiro Jinushi | Japan | 45.90 | Q |
| 2 | 7 | Mateusz Rzeźniczak | Poland | 46.11 | Q, SB |
| 3 | 3 | Nhlanhla Maseko | South Africa | 46.26 | q, PB |
| 4 | 5 | Keishon Franklin | United States | 46.72 | |
| 5 | 8 | Kubilay Ençü | Turkey | 46.74 | |
| 6 | 6 | João Falcão | Brazil | 47.45 | |
| 7 | 1 | Fredrik Øvereng | Norway | 47.53 | |
| 8 | 2 | Thiruben Thana | Singapore | 48.09 | |

==== Heat 3 ====
| Rank | Lane | Athlete | Nation | Time | Notes |
|---|---|---|---|---|---|
| 1 | 7 | Reece Holder | Australia | 45.75 | Q |
| 2 | 6 | Kenki Imaizumi | Japan | 46.01 | Q |
| 3 | 4 | Umar Osman | Malaysia | 46.09 | q, PB |
| 4 | 3 | Sewekan Thovoethin | Nigeria | 46.38 | PB |
| 5 | 1 | Phenyo Majama | Botswana | 47.40 | SB |
| 6 | 5 | José Elizondo | Costa Rica | 47.92 | |
| 7 | 8 | Godfrey Chanwengo | Uganda | 48.01 | |
| — | 2 | El Hadji Soumaré | Senegal | DNF | |

=== Final ===
| Rank | Lane | Athlete | Nation | Time | Notes |
|---|---|---|---|---|---|
| 1st place, gold medalist(s) | 5 | João Coelho | Portugal | 44.79 (.782) | GR |
| 2nd place, silver medalist(s) | 6 | Reece Holder | Australia | 44.79 (.785) | GR |
| 3rd place, bronze medalist(s) | 3 | Mihai Dringo | Romania | 45.27 | PB |
| 4 | 7 | Naohiro Jinushi | Japan | 45.58 | PB |
| 5 | 8 | Mateusz Rzeźniczak | Poland | 45.82 | PB |
| 6 | 2 | Nhlanhla Maseko | South Africa | 46.12 | PB |
| 7 | 1 | Umar Osman | Malaysia | 46.41 | |
| 8 | 4 | Kenki Imaizumi | Japan | 47.18 | |
