= Athletics at the 2021 Summer World University Games – Men's 4 × 100 metres relay =

The men's 4 × 100 metres relay event at the 2021 Summer World University Games was held on 5 and 6 August 2023 at the Shuangliu Sports Centre Stadium in Chengdu, China.

== Medalists ==
Gold	Silver	Bronze
China; Chen Jiapeng; Chen Guanfeng; Yan Haibin; Deng Zhijian; Sui Gaofei	Thailand; Natawat Iamudom; Soraoat Dapbang; Chayut Khongprasit; Thawatchai Himaiad	South Africa; Thembo Monareng; Tsebo Matsoso; Eckhart Potgieter; Shaun Maswanganyi

== Results ==
=== Round 1 ===
Qualification: First 2 in each heat (Q) and the next 2 fastest (q) advance to final.

Rank	Heat	Nation	Athletes	Time	Notes
1	1	South Africa	Thembo Monareng, Tsebo Matsoso, Eckhart Potgieter, Shaun Maswanganyi	38.73	Q
2	3	Poland	Łukasz Żak, Adam Łukomski, Patryk Wykrota, Mateusz Siuda	38.74	Q
3	2	China	Deng Zhijian, Sui Gaofei, Chen Jiapeng, Chen Guanfeng	38.93	Q
4	1	Japan	Naoki Inoue, Aoi Inage, Shota Nakamura, Yuda Nishi	38.98	Q
5	1	Thailand	Natawat Iamudom, Soraoat Dapbang, Chayut Khongprasit, Thawatchai Himaiad	39.15	q
6	3	Chinese Taipei	Song Yu-jun, Chen Wen-pu, Wu Yen-ming, Lin Yu-sian	39.17	Q
7	3	Turkey	Ertan Özkan, Kayhan Özer, Batuhan Altıntaş, Mustafa Ay	39.41	q
8	1	South Korea	Lee Jun-hyeok, Joo Seung-kyun, Lee Jae-seong, Woo In-seop	39.71	
9	2	United States	James Williamson, Joseph Taylor, Keishon Franklin, Jaylan Washington	40.02	Q
10	2	Ghana	Wallace Aflamah, Barnabas Aggerh, Israel Anane Domeh, Enoch Fosuhene	40.04	
11	1	Malaysia	M.Y.D.B. Yusof, Jonathan Nyepa, Mohamed Thaqif, Muhammad Aqil Yasmin	40.04	
12	2	Brazil	João Falcão, Adrian Vieira, Alex Oliveira, Leonardo Batista de Oliveira	40.48	
13	1	Hong Kong	Cheung Ho Hin, Leung San Lok, Shak Kam Ching, Mak Chun Ho	40.58	
14	3	Singapore	Xander Ann Heng Ho, Joshua Hanwei Chua, Ryan Praharsh, Ian Koe	40.59	
–	2	India	Gurav Pranav, Lalu Bhoi, Gurindervir Singh, Virupakshappa Shashikantha	DNF	
–	3	Uganda	Santos Okabo, Peter Masaba, Godfrey Chanwengo, Sharif Olipa	DQ	TR24.7
–	3	Nigeria		DNS	

=== Final ===
Rank	Nation	Athletes	Time	Notes
1st place, gold medalist(s)	China	Chen Jiapeng, Chen Guanfeng, Yan Haibin, Deng Zhijian	38.80	
2nd place, silver medalist(s)	Thailand	Natawat Iamudom, Soraoat Dapbang, Chayut Khongprasit, Thawatchai Himaiad	38.80	
3rd place, bronze medalist(s)	South Africa	Thembo Monareng, Tsebo Matsoso, Eckhart Potgieter, Shaun Maswanganyi	38.83	
4	Chinese Taipei	Song Yu-jun, Chen Wen-pu, Wei Tai-sheng, Lin Yu-sian	38.86	
5	Japan	Takumi Miyazaki, Aoi Inage, Shota Nakamura, Yuda Nishi	38.92	
6	Poland	Łukasz Żak, Łukasz Żok, Patryk Wykrota, Mateusz Siuda	38.96	
7	Turkey	Ertan Özkan, Kayhan Özer, Batuhan Altıntaş, Mustafa Ay	39.69	
8	United States	James Williamson, Joseph Taylor, Keishon Franklin, Jaylan Washington	39.90	
