= Cambodia at the 2021 Summer World University Games =

- Flag of Cambodia
- IOC code: CAM

in Chengdu, China 28 July 2023 – 8 August 2023
- Competitors: 11 (8 men and 3 women)
- Medals: Gold 0 Silver 0 Bronze 0 Total 0

Summer World University Games appearances
- 1959; 1961; 1963; 1965; 1967; 1970; 1973; 1975; 1977; 1979; 1981; 1983; 1985; 1987; 1989; 1991; 1993; 1995; 1997; 1999; 2001; 2003; 2005; 2007; 2009; 2011; 2013; 2015; 2017; 2019; 2021; 2025; 2027

Cambodia competed at the 2021 Summer World University Games in Chengdu, China held from 28 July to 8 August 2023.

== Competitors ==
Sport	Men	Women	Total
Athletics	2	1	3
Fencing	4	0	4
Taekwondo	2	2	4
Total	8	3	11

== Athletics ==
Men
Track

Athlete	Event	Heat		Semi-finals		Final	
Athlete	Event	Result	Rank	Result	Rank	Result	Rank
Yatpitou Chantivea	200 metres	22.65	20	Did not advance			

Field

Athlete	Event	Qualification		Final	
Athlete	Event	Result	Rank	Result	Rank
Chan Yan	High jump	1.95	25	Did not advance	

Women
Field

Athlete	Event	Qualification		Final	
Athlete	Event	Result	Rank	Result	Rank
Monika Neang	Shot put	10.74	15	Did not advance	

== Fencing ==
Athlete	Event	Group stage							Round of 128	Round of 64	Round of 32	Round of 16	Quarter-finals	Semi-finals	Final / BM	
Athlete	Event	Opponent score	Opponent score	Opponent score	Opponent score	Opponent score	Opponent score	Rank	Opponent score	Opponent score	Opponent score	Opponent score	Opponent score	Opponent score	Opponent score	Rank
Tangchin Thong	Men's individual épée	Dagani (SUI); L 4–5	Opanasenko (UKR); L 1–5	Sharma (IND); W 5–2	Cheong (SGP); L 0–5	Lan (CHN); L 2–5	Altaweel (KSA); L 0–5	89	Did not advance							
Nathan Ra	Men's individual épée	Grubar (SLO); L 3–5	Alhussain (KSA); L 4–5	Bonferroni (SUI); L 2–5	Si To (SGP); L 4–5	Midelton (FRA); L 1–5	Muminov (UZB); L 4–5	92	Did not advance							
Saknuk Savoeun	Men's individual épée	Sharlaimov (KAZ); L 2–5	Gaetani (ITA); L 3–5	Pandey (IND); L 2–5	Dianza (ANG); W 5–2	Schuhmann (AUT); L 4–5	Paavolainen (FIN); W 5–3	76	Did not advance							
Horng Phon	Men's individual foil	Aher (IND); L 3–5	Frűhauf (HUN); L 0–5	Macedo (POR); L 1–5	Ito (JPN); L 0–5	Loisel (FRA); L 3–5	Kuo (TPE); L 2–5	65	Did not advance							
Tangchin Thong; Saknuk Savoeun; Nathan Ra	Men's team épée	—									Czech Republic (CZE); L 20–45	Did not advance				

== Taekwondo ==
Kyorugi

Athlete	Event	Round of 32	Round of 16	Quarter-finals	Semi-finals	Final	
Athlete	Event	Opponent score	Opponent score	Opponent score	Opponent score	Opponent score	Rank
Youdeth Sam	Men's 58 kg	Park (KOR); L 0–2	Did not advance				
Mithona Va	Men's 74 kg	—	Park (KOR); L 0–2	Did not advance			
Lyden Kry	Women's 49 kg	Haouchine (ALG); W 2–1	Wongpattanakit (THA); L 0–2	Did not advance			
Aliza Chhoeung	Women's 57 kg	Harnsujin (THA); L 0–2	Did not advance				
