= Athletics at the 2021 Summer World University Games – Women's high jump =

The women's high jump event at the 2021 Summer World University Games was held on 4 and 6 August 2023 at the Shuangliu Sports Centre Stadium in Chengdu, China.

== Medalists ==
Gold	Silver	Bronze
Rose Amoanimaa Yeboah; Ghana	Elena Kulichenko; Cyprus	Venla Pulkkanen; Finland

== Results ==
=== Qualification ===
Qualification: Qualifying performance 1.88 (Q) or at least 12 best performers (q) advance to the final.

Rank	Group	Name	Nationality	1.60	1.65	1.70	1.75	1.80	1.84	Result	Notes
1	A	Nadezhda Dubovitskaya	Kazakhstan	–	–	–	o	o	o	1.84	q
1	A	Venla Pulkkanen	Finland	–	–	o	o	o	o	1.84	q
3	A	Rose Amoanimaa Yeboah	Ghana	–	o	o	xo	xxo	o	1.84	q
4	B	Elena Kulichenko	Cyprus	–	–	–	o	o	xo	1.84	q
5	B	Ella Junnila	Finland	–	–	–	o	xo	xo	1.84	q
6	B	Blessing Enatoh	Germany	–	–	o	o	o	xxx	1.80	q
6	B	Lee Ching-ching	Chinese Taipei	–	–	o	o	o	xxx	1.80	q
6	B	Kristina Ovchinnikova	Kazakhstan	–	–	–	o	o	xxx	1.80	q
9	A	Gintarė Tirevičiūtė	Lithuania	–	–	o	xo	o	xxx	1.80	q
10	A	Fédra Fekete	Hungary	–	–	o	o	xo	xxx	1.80	q
11	A	Barnokhon Sayfullaeva	Uzbekistan	–	o	xo	o	xo	xxx	1.80	q
12	A	Monika Podlogar	Slovenia	–	–	o	xxo	xo	xxx	1.80	q
13	B	Deng Siyi	China	–	–	o	o	xxo	xxx	1.80	SB
13	A	Shao Yuqi	China	–	–	o	o	xxo	xxx	1.80	
13	B	Asia Tavernini	Italy	–	–	–	o	xxo	xxx	1.80	
16	A	Sara Aščić	Croatia	–	–	o	o	xxx		1.75	
17	B	Urtė Baikštytė	Lithuania	–	–	o	xo	xxx		1.75	
17	B	Sarah Freitas	Brazil	–	o	o	xo	xxx		1.75	
19	A	Jhang Chiau-yin	Chinese Taipei	–	–	o	xo	xxx		1.75	
20	B	Chung Wai Yan	Hong Kong	–	o	o	xxx			1.70	
20	B	Katrine Olsen	Denmark	–	o	o	xxx			1.70	
20	B	Darina Rezik	Algeria	–	–	o	xxx			1.70	
23	A	Lai Yan Hei	Hong Kong	–	xxo	o	xxx			1.70	
24	A	Khyati Mathur	India	o	o	xo	xxx			1.70	
25	B	Oh Su-jeong	South Korea	o	o	xxo	xxx			1.70	
26	A	Michelle Ngozo	South Africa	xo	o	xxo	xxx			1.70	
27	A	Maryam Abdulelah	Iraq	o	o	xxx				1.65	
28	A	Fabriliani Nabilah	Indonesia	xxo	o	xxx				1.65	
29	B	Sidney Gilliland	United States	o	xxx					1.60	
–	B	Matandoor Sinchana	India	xxx						NM	
–	B	Aliya Al-Mughairi	Oman	xxx						NM	

=== Final ===
Rank	Name	Nationality	1.70	1.75	1.80	1.84	1.88	1.91	1.94	1.97	Result	Notes
1st place, gold medalist(s)	Rose Amoanimaa Yeboah	Ghana	o	o	xo	o	xxo	xo	xxo	xxx	1.94	PB
2nd place, silver medalist(s)	Elena Kulichenko	Cyprus	–	o	o	o	xxo	xxo	xxx		1.91	PB
3rd place, bronze medalist(s)	Venla Pulkkanen	Finland	–	o	o	xxo	o	xxx			1.88	PB
4	Nadezhda Dubovitskaya	Kazakhstan	–	o	o	o	xxx				1.84	
4	Ella Junnila	Finland	–	–	o	o	xxx				1.84	
6	Kristina Ovchinnikova	Kazakhstan	–	o	xo	o	xxx				1.84	
7	Blessing Enatoh	Germany	o	o	o	xxx					1.80	
8	Monika Podlogar	Slovenia	o	xo	o	xxx					1.80	
9	Gintarė Tirevičiūtė	Lithuania	o	o	xo	xxx					1.80	
10	Fédra Fekete	Hungary	o	o	xxo	xxx					1.80	
11	Lee Ching-ching	Chinese Taipei	–	xo	xxo	xxx					1.80	
12	Barnokhon Sayfullaeva	Uzbekistan	o	o	xxx						1.75	
