= Athletics at the 2021 Summer World University Games – Men's 400 metres hurdles =

The men's 400 metres hurdles event at the 2021 Summer World University Games was held on 2, 3 and 4 August 2023 at the Shuangliu Sports Centre Stadium in Chengdu, China.

== Medalists ==
Gold	Silver	Bronze
Peng Ming-yang; Chinese Taipei	İsmail Nezir; Turkey	Xie Zhiyu; China

== Results ==
=== Round 1 ===
Qualification: First 3 in each heat (Q) and the next 4 fastest (q) advance to semifinal.

==== Heat 1 ====
Rank	Lane	Athlete	Nation	Time	Notes
1	8	Gabriele Montefalcone	Italy	49.99	Q
2	6	Peng Ming-yang	Chinese Taipei	50.16	Q
3	1	Jakub Olejniczak	Poland	50.39	Q
4	4	Calvin Quek	Singapore	50.43	q, PB
5	7	Mohammed Al-Muawi	Saudi Arabia	50.59	q
6	2	Vyacheslav Zems	Kazakhstan	51.83	
7	5	Samuel Wiik	Sweden	53.14	
8	3	Pravin Peter	India	53.73	

==== Heat 2 ====
Rank	Lane	Athlete	Nation	Time	Notes
1	1	Song Jiahui	China	50.45	Q
2	7	İsmail Nezir	Turkey	51.16	Q
3	5	Rivaldo Leacock	Barbados	51.32	Q
4	3	Wernich van Rensburg	South Africa	51.45	
5	4	Rusleen Roseli	Malaysia	52.77	
6	6	Rohith Arambam	India	53.12	
7	2	Jordan Santos	Brazil	53.46	
—	8	Jake Calucag	Philippines	DNF	

==== Heat 3 ====
Rank	Lane	Athlete	Nation	Time	Notes
1	5	Xie Zhiyu	China	50.09	Q
2	2	Lindukuhle Gora	South Africa	50.20	Q
3	6	Mehdi Pirjahan	Iran	50.22	Q
4	3	Adam Smolka	Czech Republic	50.35	q
5	8	Chen Jian-rong	Chinese Taipei	52.03	
6	4	Gustav Karlsson	Sweden	52.62	
7	1	Levente Soós	Hungary	53.12	
—	7	Busani Ndlovu	Zimbabwe	DNS	

==== Heat 4 ====
Rank	Lane	Athlete	Nation	Time	Notes
1	7	Berke Akçam	Turkey	50.57	Q
2	6	Krzysztof Hołub	Poland	50.91	Q
3	2	Matej Baluch	Slovakia	51.17	Q
4	1	Natthaphon Dansungnoen	Thailand	51.25	q
5	4	Leo Köhldorfer	Austria	51.98	
6	3	Tshotlego Frecky	Botswana	52.52	
7	5	Joshua Adhémar	Haiti	52.55	
—	8	Vincent Lopez	United States	DQ	TR16.8

=== Semifinal ===
Qualification: First 3 in each heat (Q) and the next 2 fastest (q) advance to final.

==== Heat 1 ====
Rank	Lane	Athlete	Nation	Time	Notes
1	5	Peng Ming-yang	Chinese Taipei	48.97	Q, PB
2	4	Berke Akçam	Turkey	49.08	Q
3	7	Xie Zhiyu	China	49.25	Q
4	3	Mehdi Pirjahan	Iran	49.33	q, PB
5	6	Krzysztof Hołub	Poland	49.36	q, PB
6	1	Natthaphon Dansungnoen	Thailand	50.71	PB
7	2	Adam Smolka	Czech Republic	51.41	
8	8	Rivaldo Leacock	Barbados	51.66	

==== Heat 2 ====
Rank	Lane	Athlete	Nation	Time	Notes
1	7	Gabriele Montefalcone	Italy	49.15	Q, PB
2	6	İsmail Nezir	Turkey	49.51	Q
3	5	Lindukuhle Gora	South Africa	49.57	Q, PB
4	3	Matej Baluch	Slovakia	49.59	
5	3	Song Jiahui	China	49.79	SB
6	2	Mohammed Al-Muawi	Saudi Arabia	49.92	PB
7	8	Jakub Olejniczak	Poland	50.03	PB
8	1	Calvin Quek	Singapore	51.77	

=== Final ===
Rank	Lane	Athlete	Nation	Time	Notes
1st place, gold medalist(s)	5	Peng Ming-yang	Chinese Taipei	48.62	PB
2nd place, silver medalist(s)	7	İsmail Nezir	Turkey	48.72	PB
3rd place, bronze medalist(s)	8	Xie Zhiyu	China	48.78	PB
4	4	Berke Akçam	Turkey	48.93	
5	6	Gabriele Montefalcone	Italy	49.36	
6	1	Mehdi Pirjahan	Iran	49.53	
7	2	Krzysztof Hołub	Poland	50.04	
—	3	Lindukuhle Gora	South Africa	DQ	TR22.6.1
