= Athletics at the 2021 Summer World University Games – Women's triple jump =

The women's triple jump event at the 2021 Summer World University Games was held on 3 and 5 August 2023 at the Shuangliu Sports Centre Stadium in Chengdu, China.

== Medalists ==
Gold	Silver	Bronze
Tuğba Danışmaz; Turkey	Diana Zagainova; Lithuania	Adrianna Laskowska; Poland

== Results ==
=== Qualification ===
Qualification: Qualifying performance 14.00 (Q) or at least 12 best performers (q) advance to the final.

Rank	Group	Name	Nationality	#1	#2	#3	Result	Notes
1	B	Tuğba Danışmaz	Turkey	x	14.01		14.01	Q
2	B	Diana Zagainova	Lithuania	13.76	x	–	13.76	q
3	A	Adrianna Laskowska	Poland	13.28	x	13.37	13.37	q
4	B	Karolina Młodawska	Poland	x	13.05	13.27	13.27	q
5	B	Akari Funada	Japan	x	13.26	12.29	13.26	q
6	B	Hua Shihui	China	13.22	13.25	x	13.25	q
7	A	Anastasia Senchiv	Moldova	13.06	13.02	13.25	13.25	q, SB
8	A	Jessica Kähärä	Finland	12.92	12.94	13.21	13.21	q
9	A	Jiang Nan	China	x	13.09	12.81	13.09	q
10	B	Desleigh Owusu	Australia	13.08	x	12.87	13.08	q
11	A	Parinya Chuaimaroeng	Thailand	12.99	x	x	12.99	q
12	B	Poorva Sawant	India	12.52	12.81	x	12.81	q
13	A	Khushnoza Shavkatova	Uzbekistan	12.74	x	12.67	12.74	
14	B	Vera Chan Shannon	Hong Kong	12.16	12.47	12.55	12.55	
15	B	Nurul Ashikin	Malaysia	x	12.50	12.54	12.54	
16	A	Gizem Akgöz	Turkey	x	x	12.52	12.52	
16	A	Anusha Mallala	India	x	x	12.52	12.52	
18	A	Mirieli Santos	Brazil	x	x	12.44	12.44	
19	B	Whaylla de Oliveira	Brazil	11.82	11.81	x	11.82	
20	A	Amtul Rehman	Pakistan	x	11.16	11.04	11.16	
–	A	Leoni Adams	Guyana				DNS	
–	B	Fatimata Zoungrana	Burkina Faso				DNS	

=== Final ===
Rank	Name	Nationality	#1	#2	#3	#4	#5	#6	Result	Notes
1st place, gold medalist(s)	Tuğba Danışmaz	Turkey	13.91	14.31	x	x	x	13.99	14.31	PB
2nd place, silver medalist(s)	Diana Zagainova	Lithuania	14.02	x	13.98	13.89	13.54	x	14.02	SB
3rd place, bronze medalist(s)	Adrianna Laskowska	Poland	13.67	13.83	x	x	x	x	13.83	
4	Karolina Młodawska	Poland	13.33	x	13.56	13.37	x	13.59	13.59	
5	Hua Shihui	China	13.26	13.19	13.41	x	13.29	13.53	13.53	PB
6	Desleigh Owusu	Australia	x	13.14	13.44	13.49	13.41	13.20	13.49	PB
7	Jiang Nan	China	x	13.49	11.14	x	12.88	13.30	13.49	PB
8	Akari Funada	Japan	13.23	x	x	13.05	x	13.14	13.23	
9	Anastasia Senchiv	Moldova	13.22	13.11	13.18				13.22	
10	Jessica Kähärä	Finland	x	12.88	13.05				13.05	
11	Parinya Chuaimaroeng	Thailand	12.83	x	12.85				12.85	
12	Poorva Sawant	India	12.80	x	x				12.80	
