= Athletics at the 2021 Summer World University Games =

- Dates: 1–6 August 2023
- Host city: Chengdu, China
- Venue: Shuangliu Sports Centre Stadium
- Level: Senior
- Events: 50

Athletics were held at the 2021 Summer World University Games during August 1 to 6, 2023, at the Shuangliu Sports Centre Stadium in Chengdu, China.

== Medal table ==
* Host nation (China)

Rank	Nation	Gold	Silver	Bronze	Total
1	China (CHN)*	10	8	7	25
2	Turkey (TUR)	8	7	3	18
3	Poland (POL)	6	6	4	16
4	Italy (ITA)	3	0	0	3
5	Japan (JPN)	2	4	5	11
6	France (FRA)	2	3	0	5
7	South Africa (RSA)	2	2	6	10
8	Portugal (POR)	2	2	0	4
9	Germany (GER)	2	1	2	5
10	Chinese Taipei (TPE)	1	2	2	5
11	Lithuania (LTU)	1	2	0	3
11	Slovakia (SVK)	1	2	0	3
13	Australia (AUS)	1	1	3	5
14	Czech Republic (CZE)	1	1	1	3
14	Ukraine (UKR)	1	1	1	3
16	Jamaica (JAM)	1	1	0	2
16	Luxembourg (LUX)	1	1	0	2
16	Uganda (UGA)	1	1	0	2
19	Finland (FIN)	1	0	2	3
19	Switzerland (SUI)	1	0	2	3
21	Austria (AUT)	1	0	1	2
22	Ghana (GHA)	1	0	0	1
23	Brazil (BRA)	0	2	0	2
23	Thailand (THA)	0	2	0	2
25	Algeria (ALG)	0	1	3	4
26	Cyprus (CYP)	0	1	0	1
26	United States (USA)	0	1	0	1
28	India (IND)	0	0	4	4
29	Hungary (HUN)	0	0	2	2
30	Armenia (ARM)	0	0	1	1
30	Kyrgyzstan (KGZ)	0	0	1	1
30	Netherlands (NED)	0	0	1	1
30	Romania (ROU)	0	0	1	1
Totals (33 entries)		50	52	52	154

Source: Medal&Rank =

== Placing Table at the Team Event ==
1. China - 293 Points
2. Turkey - 189.5 Points
3. Poland - 168 Points
4. Japan - 150 Points
5. South Africa - 101 Points
6. Germany - 69.5 Points
7. France - 67 Points
8. Australia - 58 Points
9. Chinese Taipei - 54 Points
10. Italy - 48 Points

== Medal summary ==
=== Men's events ===
Event	Gold		Silver		Bronze	
100 metres	Kadrian Goldson; Jamaica	10.04	Shaun Maswanganyi; South Africa	10.06	Chen Guanfeng; China	10.17
200 metres	Tsebo Matsoso; South Africa	20.36	Yudai Nishi; Japan	20.46	Amlan Borgohain; India	20.55 SB
400 metres	João Coelho; Portugal	44.79 GR NR	Reece Holder; Australia	44.79 GR	Mihai Sorin Dringo; Romania	45.27 NR
800 metres	Maciej Wyderka; Poland	1:49.09	Corentin le Clezio; France	1:49.17	Oussama Cherrad; Algeria Zine El Abidine Laggoune; Algeria	1:49.23
1500 metres	Benoît Campion; France	3:38.61	Oussama Cherrad; Algeria	3:40.64	Yervand Mkrtchyan; Armenia	3:40.68
5000 metres	Simon Bédard; France	14:14.10	Taiyo Yasuhara; Japan	14:14.15	Nursultan Keneshbekov; Kyrgyzstan	14:15.33 SB
10,000 metres	Dismas Yeko; Uganda	28:59.25	Sezgin Ataç; Turkey	29:06.62	Yuito Yamamoto; Japan	29:22.95
110 metres hurdles	Ken Toyoda; Japan	13.40	Ning Xiaohan; China	13.44 PB	Krzysztof Kiljan; Poland	13.55
400 metres hurdles	Peng Ming-yang; Chinese Taipei	48.62 NR	İsmail Nezir; Turkey	48.72 PB	Xie Zhiyu; China	48.78 NR
3000 metres steeplechase	Jens Mergenthaler; Germany	8:38.42	Nick Jäger; Germany	8:40.53	Atsushi Shobu; Japan	8:40.84
4 × 100 metres relay	China (CHN); Chen Jiapeng; Chen Guanfeng; Yan Haibin; Deng Zhijian; Sui Gaofei	38.80 PB	Thailand (THA); Natawat Iamudom; Soraoat Dapbang; Chayut Khongprasit; Thawatchai Himaiad	38.80 PB	South Africa (RSA); Thembo Monareng; Tsebo Matsoso; Eckhart Potgieter; Shaun Maswanganyi	38.83
4 × 400 metres relay	Turkey (TUR); İlyas Çanakçı; Kubilay Ençü; Berke Akçam; İsmail Nezir	3:03.46 PB	Poland (POL); Adam Łukomski; Patryk Grzegorzewicz; Daniel Sołtysiak; Mateusz Rzeźniczak; Krzysztof Hołub; Jakub Olejniczak	3:05.10 PB	South Africa (RSA); Nhlanhla Maseko; Tjaart van der Walt; Wernich van Rensburg; Lindukuhle Gora	3:05.17 PB
Half marathon	Sezgin Ataç; Turkey	1:04:36	Ayetullah Aslanhan; Turkey	1:04:37 PB	Yang Kegu; China	1:04:48
Half marathon team	Turkey (TUR); Sezgin Ataç; Ayetullah Aslanhan; Ömer Amaçtan; Mahsum Değer	3:14:31	China (CHN); Yang Kegu; Ma Rui; Ma Yujie; Wang Congzheng; Chen Tianyu	3:17:12	Japan (JPN); Reishi Yoshida; Kotaro Shinohara; Rei Matsunaga	3:17:18
20 kilometres walk	Salih Korkmaz; Turkey	1:23:40	Qian Haifeng; China	1:24:40	Haruki Manju; Japan	1:25:32
20 kilometres walk team	China (CHN); Qian Haifeng; Cui Lihong; Li Yandong; Zhang Hongliang; Li Xiaobin	4:18:54	Japan (JPN); Haruki Manju; Kazuhiro Tateiwa; Kento Yoshikawa	4:21:18	Australia (AUS); William Thompson; Mitchell Baker; Dylan Richardson; Timothy Fraser	4:32:52
High jump	Vladyslav Lavskyy; Ukraine	2.25 m PB	Fu Chao-hsuan; Chinese Taipei	2.20 m	Roman Petruk; Ukraine; Gergely Török; Hungary; Tsai Wei-chih; Chinese Taipei	2.20 m
Pole vault	Urho Kujanpää; Finland	5.55 m	Patsapong Amsam-ang; Thailand	5.55 m	Koen van der Wijst; Netherlands	5.45 m
Long jump	Zhang Jingqiang; China	7.93 m SB	Wen Hua-yu; Chinese Taipei	7.83 m	Lin Chia-hsing; Chinese Taipei	7.83 m
Triple jump	Su Wen; China	17.01 m	Necati Er; Turkey	16.83 m SB	Huang Huafeng; China	16.76 SB
Shot put	Konrad Bukowiecki; Poland	20.23 m SB	Szymon Mazur; Poland	19.20 m	Xaver Hastenrath; Germany	18.69 m
Discus throw	Oskar Stachnik; Poland	63.00 m SB	Kai Chang; Jamaica	61.82 m SB	Oussama Khennousi; Algeria	61.33 m NR
Hammer throw	Wang Qi; China	73.63 m	Décio Andrade; Portugal	73.43 m	Dawid Piłat; Poland	72.27 m
Javelin throw	Edis Matusevičius; Lithuania	80.37 m	Cyprian Mrzygłód; Poland	80.02 m	Topias Laine; Finland	78.42 m
Decathlon	Vilém Stráský; Czech Republic	7925 pts PB	Edgaras Benkunskas; Lithuania	7879 pts	Alec Diamond; Australia	7812 pts SB

=== Women's events ===
Event	Gold		Silver		Bronze	
100 metres	Patrizia van der Weken; Luxembourg	11.22	Viktória Forster; Slovakia	11.34	Magdalena Lindner; Austria	11.44
200 metres	Nikola Horowska; Poland	23.00 SB	Marlena Granaszewska; Poland	23.20 PB	Banele Shabangu; South Africa	23.29
400 metres	Marlie Viljoen; South Africa	52.38	Corrssia Perry; United States	52.62 PB	Barbora Malíková; Czech Republic	52.66
800 metres	Laura Pellicoro; Italy	2:04.20	Knight Aciru; Uganda	2:04.34 SB	Charne Swart; South Africa	2:04.73
1500 metres	Laura Pellicoro; Italy	4:15.82	Vera Hoffmann; Luxembourg	4:16.47	Şilan Ayyıldız; Turkey	4:17.26
5000 metres	Mariana Machado; Portugal	16:02.58	Xia Yuyu; China	16:04.00	Risa Yamazaki; Japan	16:08.86
10,000 metres	Xia Yuyu; China	33:48.35	Yayla Gönen; Turkey	34:05.03	Fatma Karasu; Turkey	34:10.97
100 metres hurdles	Viktória Forster; Slovakia	12.72 NR	Yanni Wu; China	12.76 PB	Jyothi Yarraji; India	12.78 NR
400 metres hurdles	Alice Muraro; Italy	55.48 PB	Marlene dos Santos; Brazil	56.45 PB	Sára Mátó; Hungary	56.58 PB
3000 metres steeplechase	Cara Feain-Ryan; Australia	9:46.02	Semra Karaslan; Turkey	9:50.42	Georgia Winkcup; Australia	9:51.22
4 × 100 metres relay	China (CHN); Liang Xiaojing; Ge Manqi; Cai Yanting; Li Yuting; Li He	43.70 PB	Poland (POL); Marlena Granaszewska; Monika Romaszko; Paulina Paluch; Nikola Horowska; Weronika Bartnowska	44.20	South Africa (RSA); Antoinette van der Merwe; Banele Shabangu; Joviale Mbisha; Tamzin Thomas	44.36 PB
4 × 400 metres relay	Poland (POL); Weronika Bartnowska; Karolina Łozowska; Margarita Koczanowa; Aleksandra Formella; Natalia Wosztyl; Marlena Granaszewska	3:32.81 PB	Brazil (BRA); Marlene dos Santos; Letícia Lima; Giovana dos Santos; Anny de Bassi	3:34.31 PB	Switzerland (SUI); Noémie Salamin; Veronica Vancardo; Oksana Aeschbacher; Karin Disch	3:34.57 PB
Half marathon	Hikaru Kitagawa; Japan	1:13:17	Yayla Gönen; Turkey	1:13:31	Fatma Karasu; Turkey	1:14:28
Half marathon team	Turkey (TUR); Yayla Gönen; Fatma Karasu; Derya Kunur; Burcu Subatan	3:43:14	Japan (JPN); Hikaru Kitagawa; Rio Einaga; Saki Harada	3:45:27	China (CHN); Luo Xia; Niu Lihua; Xia Yuyu; Wang Jiali	3:48:44
20 kilometres walk	Meryem Bekmez; Turkey	1:33:53	Eliška Martínková; Czech Republic	1:33:58	Gao Lan; China	1:35:28
20 kilometres walk team	China (CHN); Gao Lan; Ji Jie; Liu Roumei; Yin Lamei	4:52:02	Slovakia (SVK); Hana Burzalová; Ema Hačundová; Alžbeta Ragasová	5:05:36	India (IND); Pooja Kumawat; Nikita Lamba; Mansi Negi; Priyanka Goswami	5:12:13
High jump	Rose Amoanimaa Yeboah; Ghana	1.94 m PB	Elena Kulichenko; Cyprus	1.91 m =PB	Venla Pulkkanen; Finland	1.88 m PB
Pole vault	Angelica Moser; Switzerland	4.62 m SB	Chen Qiaoling; China; Albane Dordain; France; Berenice Petit; France	4.30 m	No medal awarded	
Long jump	Nikola Horowska; Poland	6.60 m PB	Magdalena Bokun; Poland	6.41 m	Bhavani Bhagavathi; India	6.32 m
Triple jump	Tuğba Danışmaz; Turkey	14.31 m PB	Diana Zagainova; Lithuania	14.02 m SB	Adrianna Laskowska; Poland	13.83 m
Shot put	Song Jiayuan; China	18.56 m	Eliana Bandeira; Portugal	17.47 m	Lea Riedel; Germany	17.32 m
Discus throw	Antonia Kinzel; Germany	59.18 m	Yolandi Stander; South Africa	57.89 m	Xie Yuchen; China	57.62 m SB
Hammer throw	Li Jiangyan; China	71.20 m	Xu Xinying; China	69.45 m	Aleksandra Śmiech; Poland	68.65 m
Javelin throw	Eda Tuğsuz; Turkey	59.05 m	Su Lingdan; China	57.87 m	Jana van Schalkwyk; South Africa	57.45 m PB
Heptathlon	Isabel Posch; Austria	6107 pts PB	Yuliya Loban; Ukraine	6063 pts	Lydia Boll; Switzerland	5923 pts PB

== Participating nations ==
1037 Athletes + 97 Nations:

1. Algeria (15)
2. Argentina (1)
3. Armenia (2)
4. Australia (33)
5. Austria (7)
6. Azerbaijan (3)
7. Bangladesh (2)
8. Barbados (2)
9. Botswana (10)
10. Brazil (30)
11. Bulgaria (2)
12. Burkina Faso (1)
13. Burundi (6)
14. Cambodia (3)
15. Cape Verde (2)
16. China (87)
17. Colombia (2)
18. Comoros (1)
19. Costa Rica (2)
20. Croatia (5)
21. Cyprus (5)
22. Czech Republic (9)
23. Denmark (9)
24. Equatorial Guinea (1)
25. Estonia (2)
26. Fiji (1)
27. Finland (14)
28. France (20)
29. The Gambia (2)
30. Germany (26)
31. Ghana (13)
32. Greece (4)
33. Guyana (4)
34. Haiti (2)
35. Hong Kong (24)
36. Hungary (24)
37. India (82)
38. Indonesia (9)
39. Iran (3)
40. Iraq (3)
41. Israel (1)
42. Italy (14)
43. Jamaica (3)
44. Japan (41)
45. Kazakhstan (15)
46. Kenya (2)
47. Kyrgyzstan (3)
48. Kuwait (3)
49. Lebanon (1)
50. Lithuania (9)
51. Luxembourg (3)
52. Macau (8)
53. Madagascar (1)
54. Malaysia (25)
55. Mali (2)
56. Moldova (3)
57. Morocco (10)
58. Nepal (1)
59. Netherlands (5)
60. Nigeria (8)
61. Northern Mariana Islands (2)
62. Norway (20)
63. Oman (13)
64. Pakistan (2)
65. Palestine (1)
66. Peru (2)
67. Philippines (12)
68. Poland (44)
69. Portugal (7)
70. Qatar (2)
71. Romania (3)
72. Saudi Arabia (6)
73. Senegal (6)
74. Sierra Leone (2)
75. Singapore (8)
76. Slovakia (12)
77. Slovenia (11)
78. Somalia (2)
79. South Africa (49)
80. South Korea (24)
81. Sri Lanka (6)
82. Sweden (7)
83. Switzerland (19)
84. Chinese Taipei (28)
85. Tajikistan (1)
86. Tanzania (1)
87. Thailand (13)
88. Turkey (39)
89. Turkmenistan (3)
90. Uganda (21)
91. Ukraine (7)
92. United Arab Emirates (1)
93. United States (15)
94. Uzbekistan (7)
95. Vietnam (1)
96. Zambia (7)
97. Zimbabwe (2)

== See also ==
- 2021 in the sport of athletics
- FISU World University Games
- University and college sport
