= Nigeria at the 2021 Summer World University Games =

- Flag of Nigeria
- IOC code: NGR

in Chengdu, China 28 July 2023 – 8 August 2023
- Competitors: 32 (16 men and 16 women)
- Medals: Gold 0 Silver 0 Bronze 0 Total 0

Summer World University Games appearances
- 1959; 1961; 1963; 1965; 1967; 1970; 1973; 1975; 1977; 1979; 1981; 1983; 1985; 1987; 1989; 1991; 1993; 1995; 1997; 1999; 2001; 2003; 2005; 2007; 2009; 2011; 2013; 2015; 2017; 2019; 2021; 2025; 2027

Nigeria competed at the 2021 Summer World University Games in Chengdu, China held from 28 July to 8 August 2023.

== Competitors ==
Sport	Men	Women	Total
Athletics	4	4	8
Badminton	3	2	5
Judo	1	3	4
Table tennis	2	3	5
Taekwondo	6	3	9
Tennis	0	1	1
Total	16	16	32

== Athletics ==
Men
Track

Athlete	Event	Heat		Semi-finals		Final	
Athlete	Event	Result	Rank	Result	Rank	Result	Rank
Adedigba Oluwakorede	110 metres hurdles	16.01	21	—		Did not advance	
Nurain Musa	100 metres	10.63	25	Did not advance			
Sewekan Thovoethin	400 metres	46.68 PB	4 Q	46.38 PB	7	Did not advance	

Field

Athlete	Event	Qualification		Final	
Athlete	Event	Result	Rank	Result	Rank
King Ahonkhai	Long jump	NM		Did not advance	

Women
Track

Athlete	Event	Heat		Semi-finals		Final	
Athlete	Event	Result	Rank	Result	Rank	Result	Rank
Tinuade Adekola	100 metres	13.03	44	Did not advance			
Tinuade Adekola	100 metres hurdles	19.17	27	Did not advance			
Blessing Akintoye	200 metres	Did not start					
Blessing Akintoye	400 metres	Did not start					
Victoria Aransiola	100 metres	12.21	34	Did not advance			
Victoria Aransiola	200 metres	24.98	35	Did not advance			

Field

Athlete	Event	Qualification		Final	
Athlete	Event	Result	Rank	Result	Rank
Blessing Gideon	Long jump	5.54 PB	26	Did not advance	

== Badminton ==
Men

Athlete	Event	Round of 64	Round of 32	Round of 16	Quarterfinal	Semifinal	Final / BM	
Athlete	Event	Opposition Score	Opposition Score	Opposition Score	Opposition Score	Opposition Score	Opposition Score	Rank
Simeon Akinsola	Singles	Lam (HKG); L 0–2	Did not advance					
Oluwasegun Idowu	Singles	Öztürk (TUR); L 1–2	Did not advance					
Mujittapha Umar	Singles	Ko (HKG); L 0–2	Did not advance					
Simeon Akinsola; Oluwasegun Idowu	Doubles	Bye	Zhou / He (CHN); L 0–2	Did not advance				

Women

Athlete	Event	Round of 64	Round of 32	Round of 16	Quarterfinal	Semifinal	Final / BM	
Athlete	Event	Opposition Score	Opposition Score	Opposition Score	Opposition Score	Opposition Score	Opposition Score	Rank
Motunrayo Abiola	Singles	Aoki (JPN); L 0–2	Did not advance					
Aminat Oluwafunke Ilori	Singles	Owomugisha (UGA); W w/o	Mehta (HKG); L 0–2	Did not advance				
Motunrayo Abiola; Aminat Oluwafunke Ilori	Doubles	Khomich / Hankiewicz (POL); L 0–2	Did not advance					

== Judo ==
Athlete	Event	Round of 32	Round of 16	Quarter-finals	Semi-finals	Repechage	Final / BM	
Athlete	Event	Opponent score	Opponent score	Opponent score	Opponent score	Opponent score	Opponent score	Rank
Oluwatosin Ihaza	Men's 81 kg	Murtozoev (UZB); L DNS	Did not advance					
Uforoemem Effiong	Women's 48 kg	Bye	Vieu (FRA); L DNS	Did not advance				
Enku Ekuta	Women's 63 kg	Feng (CHN); L 01–02	Did not advance					
Immaculata Ufot	Women's 57 kg	Kechout (ALG); L DNS	Did not advance					

== Table tennis ==
Singles

Athlete	Event	Group round				Round of 64	Round of 32	Round of 16	Quarterfinal	Semifinal	Final / BM	
Athlete	Event	Opposition Result	Opposition Result	Opposition Result	Rank	Opposition Result	Opposition Result	Opposition Result	Opposition Result	Opposition Result	Opposition Result	Rank
Daniel Ayuba	Men's singles	Koh (SGP); L w/o	Leong (MAC); L 1–3	Jeho (IND); L 0–3	3	Did not advance						
Prosper Obasuyi	Men's singles	Cheong (MAC); L 1–3	Georgiou (CYP); L 1–3	Bluhm (GER); L 0–3	4	Did not advance						
Oluchi Amah	Women's singles	Zulu (ZAM); D 0–0 w/o	Soo (HKG); L 0–3 w/o	Rexhaj (ALB); L 0–3 w/o	3	Did not advance						
Vivian Oku	Women's singles	Lee (KOR); L 0–3 w/o	Batmönkhiin (MGL); L 0–3 w/o	Özkaya (TUR); L 0–3 w/o	4	Did not advance						
Kehinde Oyeniyi	Women's singles	Hildebrandt (GER); L 0–3	Lima (BRA); L 0–3	Bat-Erdene (MGL); W 3–2	3	Did not advance						

Doubles

Athlete	Event	Round of 64	Round of 32	Round of 16	Quarterfinal	Semifinal	Final / BM	
Athlete	Event	Opposition Result	Opposition Result	Opposition Result	Opposition Result	Opposition Result	Opposition Result	Rank
Daniel Ayuba; Prosper Obasuyi	Men's doubles	Bye	Han / Yun (KOR); L 0–3	Did not advance				
Daniel Ayuba; Kehinde Oyeniyi	Mixed doubles	Bye	Hippler / Lemmer (GER); L 0–3	Did not advance				

== Taekwondo ==
Kyorugi
Men

Athlete	Event	Round of 32	Round of 16	Quarter-finals	Semi-finals	Final	
Athlete	Event	Opponent score	Opponent score	Opponent score	Opponent score	Opponent score	Rank
Joel Daodu	Men's 58 kg	Bye	Park (KOR); L 0–2	Did not advance			
Oluwatobi Daramola	Men's 87 kg	Bye	Tukhtasinboev (UZB); L 0–2	Did not advance			
Malachi Eze	Men's +87 kg	—	Choi (USA); L 1–2	Did not advance			
Abdulrahmon Fehintola	Men's 80 kg	Cheny (TPE); L 0–2	Did not advance				
Abdulrazak Musa	Men's 74 kg	de Moura (BRA); L 0–2	Did not advance				
Yiazibe Torukuru	Men's 54 kg	Bye	Kitade (JPN); L 0–2	Did not advance			

Women

Athlete	Event	Round of 32	Round of 16	Quarter-finals	Semi-finals	Final	
Athlete	Event	Opponent score	Opponent score	Opponent score	Opponent score	Opponent score	Rank
Joy Aiyegbeni	Women's 62 kg	Bye	Sereda (POL); L 0–2	Did not advance			
Gabey Ogbemudia	Women's 49 kg	Bye	Fonseca (USA); L 0–2	Did not advance			
Olajumoke Olateju	Women's +73 kg	—	Rivadulla (ESP); L 1–2	Did not advance			

== Tennis ==
Athlete	Event	Round of 64	Round of 32	Round of 16	Quarter-finals	Semi-finals	Final	
Athlete	Event	Opponent score	Opponent score	Opponent score	Opponent score	Opponent score	Opponent score	Rank
Blessing Danjuma	Women's singles	Bye	Johnson (USA); L 0–2	Did not advance				
