= Athletics at the 2021 Summer World University Games – Men's discus throw =

The men's discus throw event at the 2021 Summer World University Games was held on 2 August 2023 at the Shuangliu Sports Centre Stadium in Chengdu, China.

== Medalists ==
Gold	Silver	Bronze
Oskar Stachnik; Poland	Kai Chang; Jamaica	Oussama Khennoussi; Algeria

== Results ==
Rank	Name	Nationality	#1	#2	#3	#4	#5	#6	Result	Notes
1st place, gold medalist(s)	Oskar Stachnik	Poland	62.53	62.22	62.02	60.68	63.00	62.57	63.00	SB
2nd place, silver medalist(s)	Kai Chang	Jamaica	61.66	61.82	59.94	x	x	x	61.82	SB
3rd place, bronze medalist(s)	Oussama Khennoussi	Algeria	56.86	56.25	58.79	57.60	61.33	59.82	61.33	PB
4	Alessio Mannucci	Italy	56.51	61.03	59.69	60.33	x	59.50	61.03	
5	Michal Forejt	Czech Republic	x	57.77	x	58.56	57.75	58.84	58.84	
6	Sun Shichen	China	58.14	x	57.06	57.01	57.91	x	58.14	
7	Giorgos Koniarakis	Cyprus	54.17	x	55.75	54.69	55.58	53.33	55.75	
8	Nirbhay Singh	India	53.17	x	52.83	53.91	53.35	53.87	53.91	
9	Xing Jiadong	China	x	52.24	52.74				52.74	
10	Zalán Strigencz	Hungary	45.78	x	49.75				49.75	
11	Mubanga Chishimba	Zambia	34.04	30.71	29.63				34.04	
–	Francois Prinsloo	South Africa	x	x	x				NM	
–	Hari Behera	India	x	x	x				NM	
–	Abdullah Al-Zankawi	Kuwait	x	x	x				NM	
