= United Arab Emirates at the 2021 Summer World University Games =

- Flag of the United Arab Emirates
- IOC code: UAE

in Chengdu, China 28 July 2023 – 8 August 2023
- Competitors: 3 (2 men and 1 woman)
- Medals: Gold 0 Silver 0 Bronze 0 Total 0

Summer World University Games appearances
- 1959; 1961; 1963; 1965; 1967; 1970; 1973; 1975; 1977; 1979; 1981; 1983; 1985; 1987; 1989; 1991; 1993; 1995; 1997; 1999; 2001; 2003; 2005; 2007; 2009; 2011; 2013; 2015; 2017; 2019; 2021; 2025; 2027

United Arab Emirates competed at the 2021 Summer World University Games in Chengdu, China held from 28 July to 8 August 2023.

== Competitors ==
Sport	Men	Women	Total
Athletics	1	0	1
Fencing	1	1	2

== Athletics ==
Men

Athlete	Event	Heat		Semi-finals		Final	
Athlete	Event	Result	Rank	Result	Rank	Result	Rank
Hamad Alyahyaee	400 metres	Did not start					
Hamad Alyahyaee	800 metres	1:58.04	34	Did not advance			

== Fencing ==
Athlete	Event	Group stage							Round of 128	Round of 64	Round of 32	Round of 16	Quarter-finals	Semi-finals	Final / BM	
Athlete	Event	Opponent score	Opponent score	Opponent score	Opponent score	Opponent score	Opponent score	Rank	Opponent score	Opponent score	Opponent score	Opponent score	Opponent score	Opponent score	Opponent score	Rank
Khalifa Alzarooni	Men's individual épée	M. Sidikov (UZB); W 5–1	Talib (LBA); W 5–1	Michalak (POL); L 4–5	Tauriainen (FIN); W 5–2	Eskov (EST); L 0–5	Matsumoto (JPN); L 2–5	49 Q	Z. Sidikov (UZB); L 8–15	Did not advance						
Noora Albreiki	Women's individual foil	Poltz (HUN); L 0–5	Jeglińska (POL); L 1–5	Mirzaeva (UZB); W 5–3	Huang (CHN); L 0–5	Marechal (FRA); L 0–5	—	41	Did not advance							
