= Saudi Arabia at the 2021 Summer World University Games =

- Flag of Saudi Arabia
- IOC code: KSA

in Chengdu, China 28 July 2023 – 8 August 2023
- Competitors: 9 (6 men and 3 women)
- Medals: Gold 0 Silver 0 Bronze 0 Total 0

Summer World University Games appearances
- 1959; 1961; 1963; 1965; 1967; 1970; 1973; 1975; 1977; 1979; 1981; 1983; 1985; 1987; 1989; 1991; 1993; 1995; 1997; 1999; 2001; 2003; 2005; 2007; 2009; 2011; 2013; 2015; 2017; 2019; 2021; 2025; 2027

Saudi Arabia competed at the 2021 Summer World University Games in Chengdu, China held from 28 July to 8 August 2023.

== Competitors ==
Sport	Men	Women	Total
Athletics	4	2	6
Fencing	2	1	3

== Athletics ==
Men
Track

Athlete	Event	Heat		Semi-finals		Final	
Athlete	Event	Result	Rank	Result	Rank	Result	Rank
Hassan Al-Absi	100 metres	10.85	41	Did not advance			
Mohammed Al-Muawi	400 metres hurdles	50.59	11 q	49.92 PB	11	Did not advance	
Faisal Al-Saka	200 metres	23.32	52	Did not advance			

Field

Athlete	Event	Qualification		Final	
Athlete	Event	Result	Rank	Result	Rank
Mohamed Al Zayer	Hammer throw	59.08	18	Did not advance	

Women
Track

Athlete	Event	Heat		Semi-finals		Final	
Athlete	Event	Result	Rank	Result	Rank	Result	Rank
Lujain Al-Humaid	100 metres	13.13 PB	46	Did not advance			

Field

Athlete	Event	Qualification		Final	
Athlete	Event	Result	Rank	Result	Rank
Raghad Habib Bu Arish	Long jump	4.58	32	Did not advance	

== Fencing ==
Athlete	Event	Group stage							Round of 128	Round of 64	Round of 32	Round of 16	Quarter-finals	Semi-finals	Final / BM	
Athlete	Event	Opponent score	Opponent score	Opponent score	Opponent score	Opponent score	Opponent score	Rank	Opponent score	Opponent score	Opponent score	Opponent score	Opponent score	Opponent score	Opponent score	Rank
Hussain Altaweel	Men's individual épée	Dagani (SUI); W 5–3	Opanasenko (UKR); L 3–5	Sharma (IND); W 5–2	Cheong (SGP); W 5–3	Lan (CHN); W 3–2	Thong (CAM); W 5–0	13 Q	Bye	Cheong (SGP); W 15–9	Johanides (SVK); L 11–15	Did not advance				
Ahmed Alhussain	Men's individual épée	Grubar (SLO); W 5–4	Bonferroni (SUI); W 5–4	Ra (CAM); W 5–4	Si To (SGP); L 3–5	Midelton (FRA); L 1–5	Muminov (UZB); W 5–3	42	Bye	Erbetta (SUI); L 11–15	Did not advance					
Ruba Al-Masri	Women's individual sabre	Malgrem (POL); W 5–2	Arpino (ITA); L 1–5	Buitenhuis (NED); L 0–5	Shao (CHN); L 0–5	Chu (HKG); L 1–5	Anglade (USA); L 0–5	41	Did not advance							
