= Lebanon at the 2021 Summer World University Games =

- Flag of Lebanon
- IOC code: LBN

in Chengdu, China 28 July 2023 – 8 August 2023
- Competitors: 7 (1 man and 6 women)
- Medals: Gold 0 Silver 0 Bronze 0 Total 0

Summer World University Games appearances
- 1959; 1961; 1963; 1965; 1967; 1970; 1973; 1975; 1977; 1979; 1981; 1983; 1985; 1987; 1989; 1991; 1993; 1995; 1997; 1999; 2001; 2003; 2005; 2007; 2009; 2011; 2013; 2015; 2017; 2019; 2021; 2025; 2027

Lebanon competed at the 2021 Summer World University Games in Chengdu, China held from 28 July to 8 August 2023.

== Competitors ==
Sport	Men	Women	Total
Athletics	1	0	1
Swimming	0	4	4
Table tennis	0	2	2

== Athletics ==
Men

Athlete	Event	Heat		Semi-finals		Final	
Athlete	Event	Result	Rank	Result	Rank	Result	Rank
Tamer Saleh	100 metres	10.88	43	Did not advance			
Tamer Saleh	200 metres	21.78	34	Did not advance			

== Swimming ==
Women

Athlete	Event	Heat		Semi-finals		Final	
Athlete	Event	Time	Rank	Time	Rank	Time	Rank
Lara Chehayeb	50 metre butterfly	32.62	41	Did not advance			
Lara Chehayeb	100 metre butterfly	Did not start					
Lara Chehayeb	200 metre individual medley	2:56.25	27	Did not advance			
Rea Maalouf	50 metre freestyle	29.83	37	Did not advance			
Rea Maalouf	50 metre backstroke	34.35	31	Did not advance			
Rea Maalouf	50 metre breaststroke	40.51	30	Did not advance			
Rea Maalouf	100 metre breaststroke	1:29.52	32	Did not advance			
Rebecca Najem Mezher	50 metre freestyle	27.63	30	Did not advance			
Rebecca Najem Mezher	100 metre freestyle	1:00.10	38	Did not advance			
Rebecca Najem Mezher	200 metre freestyle	2:14.77	28	Did not advance			
Rebecca Najem Mezher	50 metre butterfly	29.56	33	Did not advance			
Rebecca Najem Mezher	100 metre butterfly	1:06.47	31	Did not advance			
Christelle Rouhana	100 metre freestyle	1:06.37	42	Did not advance			
Christelle Rouhana	200 metre freestyle	2:27.52	31	Did not advance			
Christelle Rouhana	200 metre individual medley	2:44.13	26	Did not advance			
Lara Chehayeb; Rea Maalouf; Rebecca Najem Mezher; Christelle Rouhana	4 x 100 metre freestyle relay	4:23.01	12	—		Did not advance	

== Table tennis ==
Athlete	Event	Group round				Round of 64	Round of 32	Round of 16	Quarterfinal	Semifinal	Final / BM	
Athlete	Event	Opposition Result	Opposition Result	Opposition Result	Rank	Opposition Result	Opposition Result	Opposition Result	Opposition Result	Opposition Result	Opposition Result	Rank
Laetitia Azar	Women's singles	Horváthová (SVK); L 0–3	Mammadova (AZE); W 3–0	Tao (MAC); W 3–2	3	Did not advance						
Mireille Boyajian	Women's singles	Farei (IRI); L 0–3	Khetkhuan (THA); L 0–3	Ji (KOR); L 0–3	4	Did not advance						
Laetitia Azar; Mireille Boyajian	Women's doubles	—				Bye	Aueawiriyayothin / Paranang (THA); L 0–3	Did not advance				
