= Guyana at the 2021 Summer World University Games =

- Flag of Guyana
- IOC code: GUY

in Chengdu, China 28 July 2023 – 8 August 2023
- Competitors: 6 (4 men and 2 women)
- Medals: Gold 0 Silver 0 Bronze 0 Total 0

Summer World University Games appearances
- 1959; 1961; 1963; 1965; 1967; 1970; 1973; 1975; 1977; 1979; 1981; 1983; 1985; 1987; 1989; 1991; 1993; 1995; 1997; 1999; 2001; 2003; 2005; 2007; 2009; 2011; 2013; 2015; 2017; 2019; 2021; 2025; 2027

Guyana competed at the 2021 Summer World University Games in Chengdu, China held from 28 July to 8 August 2023.

== Competitors ==
Sport	Men	Women	Total
Athletics	2	2	4
Table tennis	2	0	2

== Athletics ==
Men

Athlete	Event	Heat		Semi-finals		Final	
Athlete	Event	Result	Rank	Result	Rank	Result	Rank
Noelex Holder	100 metres	10.57	20 q	10.58	24	Did not advance	
Noelex Holder	200 metres	21.33	20 q	21.04 PB	17	Did not advance	
Shimar Velloza	200 metres	22.93	51	Did not advance			
Shimar Velloza	400 metres	51.45	35	Did not advance			

Women
Track

Athlete	Event	Heat		Semi-finals		Final	
Athlete	Event	Result	Rank	Result	Rank	Result	Rank
Leoni Adams	100 metres	12.80	42	Did not advance			

Field

Athlete	Event	Qualification		Final	
Athlete	Event	Result	Rank	Result	Rank
Leoni Adams	Long jump	Did not start			
Leoni Adams	Triple jump	Did not start			
Malinda Williams	Shot put	Did not start			

== Table tennis ==
Athlete	Event	Group round				Round of 64	Round of 32	Round of 16	Quarterfinal	Semifinal	Final / BM	
Athlete	Event	Opposition Result	Opposition Result	Opposition Result	Rank	Opposition Result	Opposition Result	Opposition Result	Opposition Result	Opposition Result	Opposition Result	Rank
Niran Bissu	Men's singles	Huzsvar (HUN); L 0–3	Panahov (AZE); W 3–0	Tanigaki (JPN); L 0–3	3	Did not advance						
Elishaba Johnso	Men's singles	Couri Rolim (BRA); L 0–3	Mahammad (AZE); L 0–3	Ryu (KOR); L 0–3	4	Did not advance						
Niran Bissu; Elishaba Johnso	Men's doubles	—				Bye	Gankhuyag / Myandal (MGL); L 0–3	Did not advance				
