= Laura Pellicoro =

Italian middle-distance runner

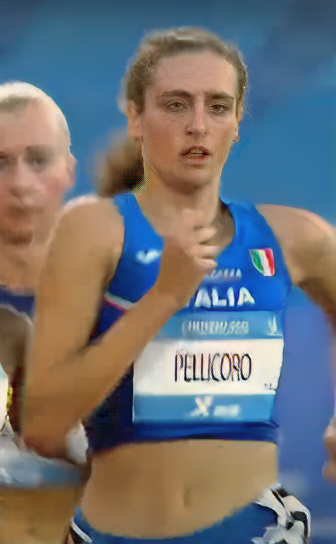
- Pellicoro in 2023.

Personal information
- National team: Italy
- Born: 24 December 2000 (age 25) Vimercate, Italy
- Height: 1.80 m (5 ft 11 in)
- Weight: 65 kg (143 lb)

Sport
- Sport: Athletics
- Event: Middle-distance running

Achievements and titles
- Personal best: 800 m: 2:03.17 (2022)
Medal record
Summer Universiade
Gold medal – first place	2021 Chengdu	800 m
Gold medal – first place	2021 Chengdu	1500 m

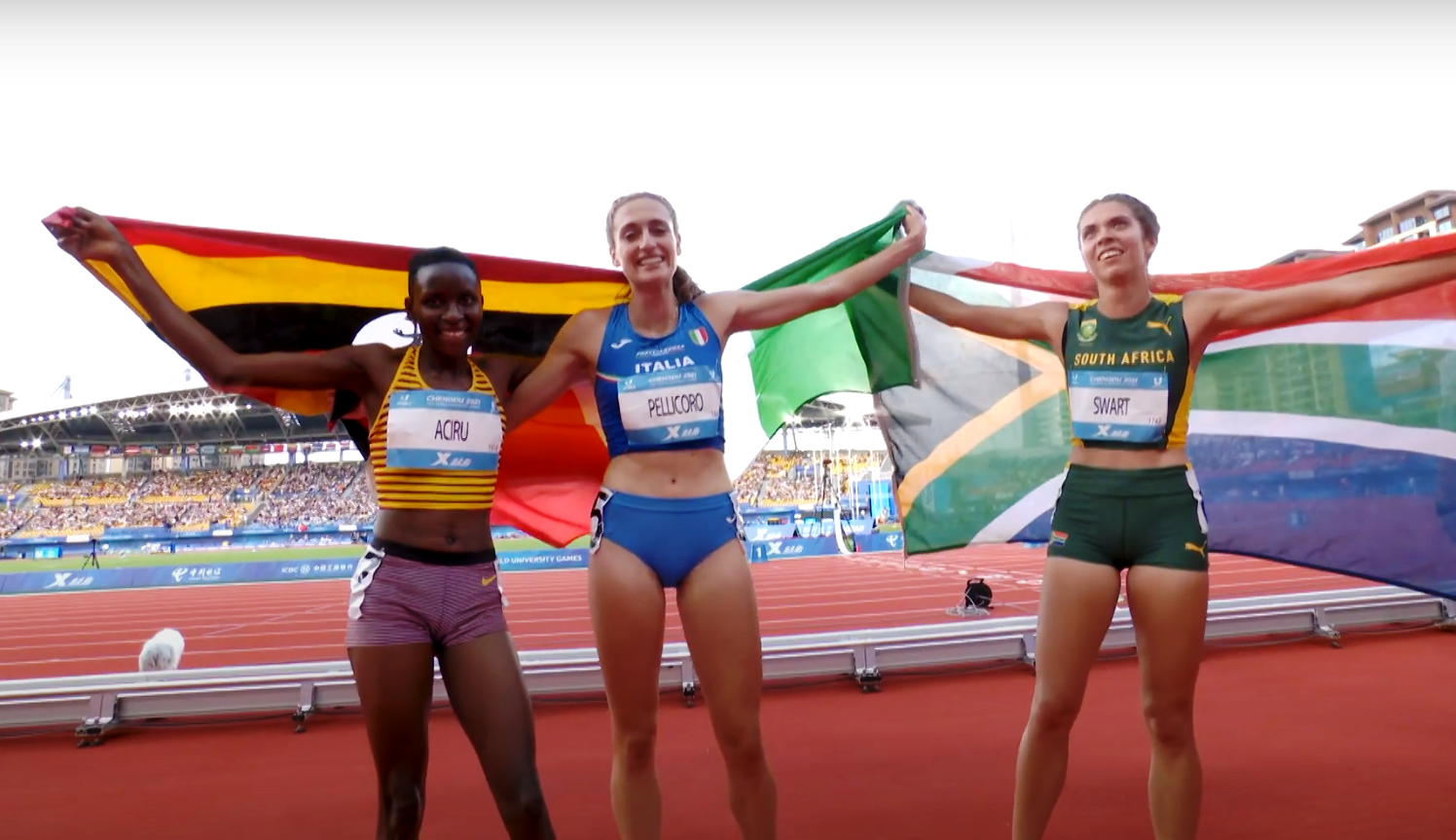
Pellicoro (center) after her victory at Chengdu 2023.

Laura Pellicoro (born 24 December 2000) is an Italian middle-distance runner gold medal at the 2021 Summer World University Games in the 800 m.

== Career ==
Pellicoro in 2019 reached the semifinal on the 800 m at the 2019 European Athletics U20 Championships.

Pellicoro competed for the Portland Pilots track and field team in the NCAA.

== Achievements ==
Year	Competition	Venue	Rank	Event	Time	Notes
2023	World University Games	(China) Chengdu	1st	800 m	2:04.20	

== National titles ==
Pellicoro has won a national championship at individual senior level.

- Italian Athletics Indoor Championships
  - 800 m: 2026
