= Iraq at the 2021 Summer World University Games =

- Flag of Iraq
- IOC code: IRQ

in Chengdu, China 28 July 2023 – 8 August 2023
- Competitors: 4 (3 men and 1 woman)
- Medals: Gold 0 Silver 0 Bronze 0 Total 0

Summer World University Games appearances
- 1959; 1961; 1963; 1965; 1967; 1970; 1973; 1975; 1977; 1979; 1981; 1983; 1985; 1987; 1989; 1991; 1993; 1995; 1997; 1999; 2001; 2003; 2005; 2007; 2009; 2011; 2013; 2015; 2017; 2019; 2021; 2025; 2027

Iraq competed at the 2021 Summer World University Games in Chengdu, China held from 28 July to 8 August 2023.

== Competitors ==
Sport	Men	Women	Total
Athletics	2	1	3
Fencing	1	0	1

== Athletics ==
Men

Athlete	Event	Heat		Semi-finals		Final	
Athlete	Event	Result	Rank	Result	Rank	Result	Rank
Murtadha Al-Kemawee	100 metres	10.68	32	Did not advance			
Murtadha Al-Kemawee	200 metres	21.65 PB	30	Did not advance			
Aktham Albo Jasim	100 metres	10.97	45	Did not advance			
Aktham Albo Jasim	200 metres	22.16	42	Did not advance			

Women

Athlete	Event	Qualification		Final	
Athlete	Event	Result	Rank	Result	Rank
Maryam Abdulelah	High jump	1.65	27	Did not advance	

== Fencing ==
Athlete	Event	Group stage							Round of 128	Round of 64	Round of 32	Round of 16	Quarter-finals	Semi-finals	Final / BM	
Athlete	Event	Opponent score	Opponent score	Opponent score	Opponent score	Opponent score	Opponent score	Rank	Opponent score	Opponent score	Opponent score	Opponent score	Opponent score	Opponent score	Opponent score	Rank
Mohammed AL-Hilfi	Men's individual sabre	Abedini (IRI); L 3–5	Sharma (IND); L 2–5	Kaczkowski (POL); L 3–5	Chang (HKG); W 5–2	Hwang (KOR); L 0–5	Horváth (HUN); L 1–5	59	Did not advance							
