= Botswana at the 2021 Summer World University Games =

- Flag of Botswana
- IOC code: BOT

in Chengdu, China 28 July 2023 – 8 August 2023
- Competitors: 10 (5 men and 5 women)
- Medals: Gold 0 Silver 0 Bronze 0 Total 0

Summer World University Games appearances
- 1959; 1961; 1963; 1965; 1967; 1970; 1973; 1975; 1977; 1979; 1981; 1983; 1985; 1987; 1989; 1991; 1993; 1995; 1997; 1999; 2001; 2003; 2005; 2007; 2009; 2011; 2013; 2015; 2017; 2019; 2021; 2025; 2027

Botswana competed at the 2021 Summer World University Games in Chengdu, China held from 28 July to 8 August 2023.

== Competitors ==
Sport	Men	Women	Total
Athletics	5	5	10

== Athletics ==
Men
Track

Athlete	Event	Heat		Semi-finals		Final	
Athlete	Event	Result	Rank	Result	Rank	Result	Rank
Tshotlego Freaky	400 metres hurdles	52.52	21	Did not advance			
Itumeleng James	800 metres	1:51.68 SB	15 q	Did not start		Did not advance	
Phenyo Majama	200 metres	21.46	27	Did not advance			
Phenyo Majama	400 metres	47.47	19 q	47.40 SB	14	Did not advance	
Thuto Masasa	100 metres	10.40	4 Q	10.39	16	Did not advance	

Field

Athlete	Event	Qualification		Final	
Athlete	Event	Result	Rank	Result	Rank
Tebogo Moepeng	Long jump	7.35	19	Did not advance	

Women
Track

Athlete	Event	Heat		Semi-finals		Final	
Athlete	Event	Result	Rank	Result	Rank	Result	Rank
Golekanye Chikani	200 metres	24.73	29	Did not advance			
Golekanye Chikani	400 metres	55.79	15 q	54.86	15	Did not advance	
Tshepang Manyika	100 metres	12.59	39	Did not advance			
Boitshepo Moloi	100 metres	12.22	35	Did not advance			
Boitshepo Moloi	200 metres	25.47	39	Did not advance			
Motlatsi Rante	400 metres	56.07	17	Did not advance			
Lone Madzimule; Motlatsi Rante; Golekanye Chikani; Boitshepo Moloi	4 × 100 metres relay	Disqualified		—		Did not advance	
—	4 × 400 metres relay	Did not start					
