= Sierra Leone at the 2021 Summer World University Games =

- Flag of Sierra Leone
- IOC code: SLE

in Chengdu, China 28 July 2023 – 8 August 2023
- Competitors: 3 (1 man and 2 women)
- Medals: Gold 0 Silver 0 Bronze 0 Total 0

Summer World University Games appearances
- 1959; 1961; 1963; 1965; 1967; 1970; 1973; 1975; 1977; 1979; 1981; 1983; 1985; 1987; 1989; 1991; 1993; 1995; 1997; 1999; 2001; 2003; 2005; 2007; 2009; 2011; 2013; 2015; 2017; 2019; 2021; 2025; 2027

Sierra Leone competed at the 2021 Summer World University Games in Chengdu, China held from 28 July to 8 August 2023.

== Competitors ==
Sport	Men	Women	Total
Athletics	1	1	2
Swimming	0	1	1

== Athletics ==
Men

Athlete	Event	Heat		Semi-finals		Final	
Athlete	Event	Result	Rank	Result	Rank	Result	Rank
Amadu Kondeh	100 metres	11.62	56	Did not advance			
Amadu Kondeh	200 metres	Did not start					

Women

Athlete	Event	Heat		Semi-finals		Final	
Athlete	Event	Result	Rank	Result	Rank	Result	Rank
Sonita Kamara	100 metres	12.49	38	Did not advance			
Sonita Kamara	200 metres	25.70	40	Did not advance			

== Swimming ==
Women

Athlete	Event	Heat		Semi-finals		Final	
Athlete	Event	Time	Rank	Time	Rank	Time	Rank
Ruth Turay	50 metre backstroke	Did not start					
