= Haiti at the 2021 Summer World University Games =

- Flag of Haiti
- IOC code: HAI

in Chengdu, China 28 July 2023 – 8 August 2023
- Competitors: 3 (3 men)
- Medals: Gold 0 Silver 0 Bronze 0 Total 0

Summer World University Games appearances
- 1959; 1961; 1963; 1965; 1967; 1970; 1973; 1975; 1977; 1979; 1981; 1983; 1985; 1987; 1989; 1991; 1993; 1995; 1997; 1999; 2001; 2003; 2005; 2007; 2009; 2011; 2013; 2015; 2017; 2019; 2021; 2025; 2027

Haiti competed at the 2021 Summer World University Games in Chengdu, China held from 28 July to 8 August 2023.

== Competitors ==
| Sport | Men | Women | Total |
|---|---|---|---|
| Athletics | 2 | 0 | 2 |
| Judo | 1 | 0 | 1 |

== Athletics ==
| Athlete | Event | Heat | | Semi-finals | | Final | |
| Athlete | Event | Result | Rank | Result | Rank | Result | Rank |
|---|---|---|---|---|---|---|---|
| Joshua Adhemar | 400 metres hurdles | 52.55 | 22 | Did not advance | | | |
| Isaac Benjamin Joseph | 100 metres | 10.85 | 40 | Did not advance | | | |
| Isaac Benjamin Joseph | 200 metres | 21.61 | 29 | Did not advance | | | |

== Judo ==
Men

| Athlete | Event | Round of 32 | Round of 16 | Quarter-finals | Semi-finals | Repechage | Final / BM | |
| Athlete | Event | Opponent score | Opponent score | Opponent score | Opponent score | Opponent score | Opponent score | Rank |
|---|---|---|---|---|---|---|---|---|
| Peterson Examar | Men's 100 kg | Mansurov (UZB); L 00–10 | Did not advance | | | | | |
