= Madagascar at the 2021 Summer World University Games =

- Flag of Madagascar
- IOC code: MAD

in Chengdu, China 28 July 2023 – 8 August 2023
- Competitors: 3 (2 men and 1 woman)
- Medals: Gold 0 Silver 0 Bronze 0 Total 0

Summer World University Games appearances
- 1959; 1961; 1963; 1965; 1967; 1970; 1973; 1975; 1977; 1979; 1981; 1983; 1985; 1987; 1989; 1991; 1993; 1995; 1997; 1999; 2001; 2003; 2005; 2007; 2009; 2011; 2013; 2015; 2017; 2019; 2021; 2025; 2027

Madagascar competed at the 2021 Summer World University Games in Chengdu, China held from 28 July to 8 August 2023.

== Competitors ==
Sport	Men	Women	Total
Athletics	1	0	1
Taekwondo	1	1	2

== Athletics ==
Track

Athlete	Event	Heat		Semi-finals		Final	
Athlete	Event	Result	Rank	Result	Rank	Result	Rank
Narindra Rafidimalala	100 metres	11.07	48	Did not advance			

Field

Athlete	Event	Qualification		Final	
Athlete	Event	Result	Rank	Result	Rank
Narindra Rafidimalala	Long jump	7.01	27	Did not advance	

== Taekwondo ==
Kyorugi

Athlete	Event	Round of 32	Round of 16	Quarter-finals	Semi-finals	Final	
Athlete	Event	Opponent score	Opponent score	Opponent score	Opponent score	Opponent score	Rank
Steve Rakotobe	Men's 68 kg	Dehghanisaloomahalleh (IRI); L 0–2	Did not advance				
Campbell Rafanomezantsoa	Women's 46 kg	—	Qabaha (PLE); L 0–2	Did not advance			
