= Lithuania at the 2021 Summer World University Games =

- Flag of Lithuania
- IOC code: LTU

in Chengdu, China 28 July 2023 – 8 August 2023
- Competitors: 36 (24 men and 12 women) in 6 sports
- Medals Ranked 9th: Gold 6 Silver 4 Bronze 2 Total 12

Summer World University Games appearances
- 1959; 1961; 1963; 1965; 1967; 1970; 1973; 1975; 1977; 1979; 1981; 1983; 1985; 1987; 1989; 1991; 1993; 1995; 1997; 1999; 2001; 2003; 2005; 2007; 2009; 2011; 2013; 2015; 2017; 2019; 2021; 2025; 2027

Lithuania competed at the 2021 Summer World University Games in Chengdu, China held from 28 July to 8 August 2023.

== Competitors ==
The following is the list of competitors in the Games.

Sport	Men	Women	Total
Athletics	4	5	9
Basketball	12	0	12
Fencing	0	1	1
Judo	1	2	3
Rowing	3	3	6
Swimming	4	1	5
Total	24	12	36

== Medal summary ==
=== Medal by sports ===
Rank	Sports	Gold	Silver	Bronze	Total
1	Swimming	3	1	2	6
2	Rowing	2	1	0	3
3	Athletics	1	2	0	3
Totals (3 entries)		6	4	2	12

=== Medalists ===
Medal	Name	Sport	Event	Day
Gold	Kotryna Teterevkova	Swimming	Women's 100 metre breaststroke	3 August
Gold	Kotryna Teterevkova	Swimming	Women's 200 metre breaststroke	5 August
Gold	Edis Matusevičius	Athletics	Men's javelin throw	6 August
Gold	Povilas Stankūnas	Rowing	Men's single sculls	6 August
Gold	Martyna Kazlauskaitė; Ugnė Juzėnaitė	Rowing	Women's double sculls	6 August
Gold	Kotryna Teterevkova	Swimming	Women's 50 metre breaststroke	7 August
Silver	Tomas Navikonis	Swimming	Men's 200 metre freestyle	3 August
Silver	Edgaras Benkunskas	Athletics	Men's decathlon	3 August
Silver	Diana Zagainova	Athletics	Women's triple jump	5 August
Silver	Mantas Juškevičius; Domantas Maročka	Rowing	Women's double sculls	6 August
Bronze	Andrius Šidlauskas	Swimming	Men's 100 metre breaststroke	2 August
Bronze	Jokūbas Keblys	Swimming	Men's 50 metre freestyle	7 August
