= Burundi at the 2021 Summer World University Games =

- Flag of Burundi
- IOC code: BDI

in Chengdu, China 28 July 2023 – 8 August 2023
- Competitors: 6 (5 men and 1 woman)
- Medals: Gold 0 Silver 0 Bronze 0 Total 0

Summer World University Games appearances
- 1959; 1961; 1963; 1965; 1967; 1970; 1973; 1975; 1977; 1979; 1981; 1983; 1985; 1987; 1989; 1991; 1993; 1995; 1997; 1999; 2001; 2003; 2005; 2007; 2009; 2011; 2013; 2015; 2017; 2019; 2021; 2025; 2027

Burundi competed at the 2021 Summer World University Games in Chengdu, China held from 28 July to 8 August 2023.

== Competitors ==
Sport	Men	Women	Total
Athletics	5	1	6

== Athletics ==
Men
Track

Athlete	Event	Heat		Semi-finals		Final	
Athlete	Event	Result	Rank	Result	Rank	Result	Rank
Hervé Orly Cubahiro	200 metres	Disqualified		Did not advance			
Billy Carl Ingabire	400 metres	51.84	36	Did not advance			
Billy Carl Ingabire	800 metres	1:54.42 PB	30	Did not advance			
Léandre Hamenyimana	800 metres	1:54.16	29	Did not advance			
Léandre Hamenyimana	1500 metres	3:56.59	19	—		Did not advance	
Léandre Hamenyimana	5000 metres	Did not start		—		Did not advance	
James Manamugabe	200 metres	24.18	35	Did not advance			
James Manamugabe	400 metres	52.09	37	Did not advance			
Jules Niteka	100 metres	11.54	55	Did not advance			
Hervé Orly Cubahiro; Léandre Hamenyimana; James Manamugabe; Billy Carl Ingabire	4 × 400 metres relay	3:28.40	7 Q	—		Disqualified	

Field

Athlete	Event	Qualification		Final	
Athlete	Event	Result	Rank	Result	Rank
Hervé Orly Cubahiro	High jump	Did not start		Did not advance	

Women
Track

Athlete	Event	Heat		Semi-finals		Final	
Athlete	Event	Result	Rank	Result	Rank	Result	Rank
Violette Ndayikengurukiye	5000 metres	16:54.49 PB	5 Q	—		17:11.92	13
