= Cape Verde at the 2021 Summer World University Games =

- Flag of Cape Verde
- IOC code: CPV

in Chengdu, China 28 July 2023 – 8 August 2023
- Competitors: 2 (1 man and 1 woman)
- Medals: Gold 0 Silver 0 Bronze 0 Total 0

Summer World University Games appearances
- 1959; 1961; 1963; 1965; 1967; 1970; 1973; 1975; 1977; 1979; 1981; 1983; 1985; 1987; 1989; 1991; 1993; 1995; 1997; 1999; 2001; 2003; 2005; 2007; 2009; 2011; 2013; 2015; 2017; 2019; 2021; 2025; 2027

Cape Verde competed at the 2021 Summer World University Games in Chengdu, China held from 28 July to 8 August 2023.

== Competitors ==
Sport	Men	Women	Total
Athletics	1	1	2

== Athletics ==
Men

Athlete	Event	Heat		Semi-finals		Final	
Athlete	Event	Result	Rank	Result	Rank	Result	Rank
Carlos Morais	100 metres	Did not start					
Carlos Morais	200 metres	22.44	47	Did not advance			

Women
Track

Athlete	Event	Heat		Semi-finals		Final	
Athlete	Event	Result	Rank	Result	Rank	Result	Rank
Ivanesia Djedjo	200 metres	26.92	44	Did not advance			

Field

Athlete	Event	Qualification		Final	
Athlete	Event	Result	Rank	Result	Rank
Ivanesia Djedjo	Long jump	5.29 SB	28	Did not advance	
