= Senegal at the 2021 Summer World University Games =

- Flag of Senegal
- IOC code: SEN

in Chengdu, China 28 July 2023 – 8 August 2023
- Competitors: 5 (3 men and 2 women)
- Medals: Gold 0 Silver 0 Bronze 0 Total 0

Summer World University Games appearances
- 1959; 1961; 1963; 1965; 1967; 1970; 1973; 1975; 1977; 1979; 1981; 1983; 1985; 1987; 1989; 1991; 1993; 1995; 1997; 1999; 2001; 2003; 2005; 2007; 2009; 2011; 2013; 2015; 2017; 2019; 2021; 2025; 2027

Senegal competed at the 2021 Summer World University Games in Chengdu, China held from 28 July to 8 August 2023.

== Competitors ==
Sport	Men	Women	Total
Athletics	2	1	3
Swimming	1	1	2

== Athletics ==
Men

Athlete	Event	Heat		Semi-finals		Final	
Athlete	Event	Result	Rank	Result	Rank	Result	Rank
El Hadji Malick Soumaré	400 metres	47.28	13 q	Did not finish		Did not advance	
Saliou Seck	200 metres	Did not start					

Women

Athlete	Event	Heat		Semi-finals		Final	
Athlete	Event	Result	Rank	Result	Rank	Result	Rank
Fatoumata Baldé	400 metres	57.02	21	Did not advance			
Fatoumata Baldé	400 metres hurdles	Did not start					

== Swimming ==
Men

Athlete	Event	Heat		Semi-finals		Final	
Athlete	Event	Time	Rank	Time	Rank	Time	Rank
Matthieu Seye	100 metre freestyle	Did not start					
Matthieu Seye	50 metre butterfly	Did not start					

Women

Athlete	Event	Heat		Semi-finals		Final	
Athlete	Event	Time	Rank	Time	Rank	Time	Rank
Oumy Diop	100 metre freestyle	Did not start					
Oumy Diop	50 metre backstroke	Did not start					
Oumy Diop	100 metre butterfly	Did not start					
