= Portugal at the 2021 Summer World University Games =

- Flag of Portugal
- IOC code: POR

in Chengdu, China 28 July 2023 – 8 August 2023
- Competitors: 44 (23 men and 21 women)
- Medals Ranked 18th: Gold 3 Silver 4 Bronze 0 Total 7

Summer World University Games appearances
- 1959; 1961; 1963; 1965; 1967; 1970; 1973; 1975; 1977; 1979; 1981; 1983; 1985; 1987; 1989; 1991; 1993; 1995; 1997; 1999; 2001; 2003; 2005; 2007; 2009; 2011; 2013; 2015; 2017; 2019; 2021; 2025; 2027

Portugal competed at the 2021 Summer World University Games in Chengdu, China held from 28 July to 8 August 2023.

== Medal summary ==
=== Medal by sports ===
Rank	Sports	Gold	Silver	Bronze	Total
1	Athletics	2	2	0	4
2	Swimming	1	2	0	3
Totals (2 entries)		3	4	0	7

=== Medalists ===
Medal	Name	Sport	Event	Day
Gold	João Coelho	Athletics	Men's 400 metres	3 August
Gold	Gabriel Lopes	Swimming	Men's 200 metre individual medley	3 August
Gold	Mariana Machado	Athletics	Women's 5000 metres	5 August
Silver	Eliana Bandeira	Athletics	Women's shot put	1 August
Silver	Camila Rebelo	Swimming	Women's 200 metre backstroke	2 August
Silver	Decio Andrade	Athletics	Men's hammer throw	4 August
Silver	Camila Rebelo	Swimming	Women's 100 metre backstroke	4 August
