= Chen Guanfeng =

Chinese sprinter (born 2000)

Personal information
- Nationality: Chinese
- Born: 5 February 2000 (age 26) Guangzhou, Guangdong, China
- Education: Shanghai University of Sport
- Height: 1.80 m (5 ft 11 in)
- Weight: 70 kg (154 lb)

Sport
- Country: China
- Sport: Track and field
- Event(s): 60 m, 100 m, 200 m, 4×100 m relay, 4×200 m relay

Achievements and titles
- Personal bests: 60 m: 6.63 (2021); 100 m: 10.06 (2021); 200 m: 21.60 (2022)
Medal record
Men's athletics
Representing China
Asian Games
Gold medal – first place	2022 Hangzhou	4×100 m relay
Asian Championships
Silver medal – second place	2023 Bangkok	4×100 m relay
Summer World University Games
Gold medal – first place	2021 Chengdu	4×100 m relay
Bronze medal – third place	2021 Chengdu	100 m

Chen Guanfeng (Chinese: 陈冠锋; pinyin: Chénguānfēng; born 5 February 2000) is a Chinese track and field sprinter. He represented his country at the 2022 World Athletics Championships where he competed in the Men's 4 × 100 metres relay event.

== Background ==
Chen was born in Guangzhou, Guangdong, China. In 2017 he joined Guangzhou Sports Polytechnic to train as a full-time athlete.

He obtained a bronze medal at the 100m event in athletics of the 2021 Summer World University Games.

His idol is Su Bingtian.

== Statistics ==
Information from World Athletics profile unless otherwise noted.

=== Personal bests ===
Event	Time (s)	Wind (m/s)	Competition	Venue	Date	Notes
60 m	6.63	-0.8	CAA Sprints Permit	Shenzhen, China	20 March 2021	
100 m	10.06	+0.1	Chinese National Games Trials	Chongqing, China	24 June 2021	
200 m	21.60	-0.3	Athletics Division Invitational Competition	Huangshi, China	10 June 2022	
4×100 m relay	38.39	—N/a	Exciting Hangzhou Athletics Invitational Tournament	Hangzhou, China	10 July 2021	
4x200 m relay	1:24.15	—N/a	Athletics Division Invitational Tournament	Fuzhou, China	23 May 2021	

=== International competition results ===
Representing China
Year	Competition	Venue	Position	Event	Time	Wind (m/s)	Notes
2022	World Championships	Eugene, USA	5th (heat 1)	4×100 m relay	38.16	—N/a	
2022	Meeting Internazionale di Atletica Leggera	Lignano Sabbiadoro, Italy	3rd	100 m	10.37	+0.3	
2022	Meeting Internazionale di Atletica Leggera	Lignano Sabbiadoro, Italy	1st	4×100 m relay	39.74	—N/a	
2022	Meeting serale di Lugano	Lugano, Switzerland	1st	100 m	10.18	+3.4	
2022	Meeting serale di Lugano	Lugano, Switzerland	1st	4×100 m relay	39.19	—N/a	

=== National competition results ===
Year	Competition	Venue	Position	Event	Time	Wind (m/s)	Notes
2019	Chinese Indoor Championships	Nanjing	2nd	60 m	6.72	—N/a	
2019	Chinese Indoor Championships	Nanjing	2nd	200 m	22.53	—N/a	
2019	Chinese Athletics Championships	Shenyang	4th	100 m	10.54	+0.4	
2019	Chinese Athletics Championships	Shenyang	2nd	4×100 m relay	39.29	—N/a	
2020	Chinese Athletics Championships	Shaoxing	3rd	100 m	10.36	-0.2	
2020	Chinese Athletics Championships	Shaoxing	1st	4×100 m relay	39.00	—N/a	
2021	Chinese National Games	Xi'an	5th	100 m	10.23	+0.1	
2021	Chinese National Games	Xi'an	4th	4×100 m relay	38.98	—N/a	
2023	Chinese Indoor Championships	Tianjin	1st	60 m	6.55	—N/a	
2023	Chinese Athletics Championships	Shenyang	3rd	100 m	10.21	+0.7	
