= Deng Zhijian =

Chinese sprinter (born 2002)

Personal information
- Nationality: Chinese
- Born: 5 March 2002 (age 24) Jiangyou, Mianyang, Sichuan, China
- Education: Chengdu Sport University
- Height: 185 cm (6 ft 1 in)

Sport
- Country: China
- Sport: Athletics
- Event: Sprints

Achievements and titles
- Personal bests: 60 m: 6.83 (2021); 100 m: 10.24 (2021); 200 m: 21.04 (2022)
Medal record
Men's athletics
Representing China
Summer World University Games
| Gold medal – first place | 2021 Chengdu | 4×100 m relay |
National Games of China
| Bronze medal – third place | 2021 Shaanxi | 4×100 m relay |

Deng Zhijian (Chinese: 邓智舰; pinyin: Dèng Zhìjiàn; born March 5, 2002) is a Chinese sprinter.

== Background ==
Deng was born in Jiangyou, Mianyang, Sichuan, China.

In October 2015, Deng was chosen to selected to join the provincial track and field team.

Deng won a bronze medal as part of the Sichuan provincial team in the 4 × 100 metres relay event of the 2021 National Games of China. He also participated in the 100 m event where he ran a personal best of 10.24 seconds in the semifinals. He came sixth overall in the event.

He currently studies at Chengdu Sport University. In 2023, he won a gold medal representing China in the 4 × 100 metres relay event of the 2021 Summer World University Games. Deng was the anchor leg of his team and his performance allowed China to beat Thailand by a fraction of a second. In 2024, he competed in the 4 × 100 metres relay event of the 2024 Olympic Games.
