= Andrea Federici =

Italian sprinter (born 1997)

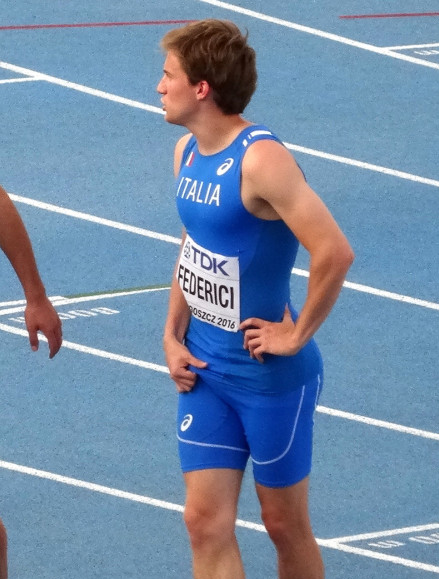
- Federici in 2016

Personal information
- National team: Italy: 1 caps (2021-)
- Born: 24 February 1997 (age 29) Brescia, Italy
- Height: 1.78 m (5 ft 10 in)
- Weight: 69 kg (152 lb)

Sport
- Sport: Athletics
- Event: Sprinting
- Club: Atletica Biotekna Marcon
- Coached by: Marinella Signori

Achievements and titles
- Personal bests: 100 m: 10.24 (2022); 200 m: 20.35 (2024)
Medal record
Mediterranean Games
Gold medal – first place	2022 Oran	4×100 m relay

Andrea Federici (born 24 February 1997) is an Italian sprinter. He won the gold medal at the 2022 Mediterranean Games.

== Achievements ==
Year	Competition	Venue	Rank	Event	Time	Notes
2022	Mediterranean Games	(Algeria) Oran	1st	4 × 100 m relay	38.95	SB

== See also ==
- Italian national track relay team
