= Tsebo Matsoso =

South African athlete

Personal information
- Born: 27 May 1999 (age 27)

Sport
- Country: South Africa
- Sport: Athletics
- Events: 100 metres, 200 metres

Achievements and titles
- Personal bests: 60 m: 6.66 (2020); 100 m: 10.03 (2025); 200 m: 20.33 (2023)
Medal record
Summer World University Games
Gold medal – first place	2021 Chengdu	200 m
Bronze medal – third place	2021 Chengdu	4 × 100 m relay

Isadore Tsebo Matsoso (born 27 May 1999) is a South African track and field athlete.

He won a gold medal in the 200 metres and a bronze medal in 4 × 100 metres relay at the 2021 Summer World University Games.
