= Diana Zagainova =

Lithuanian triple jumper

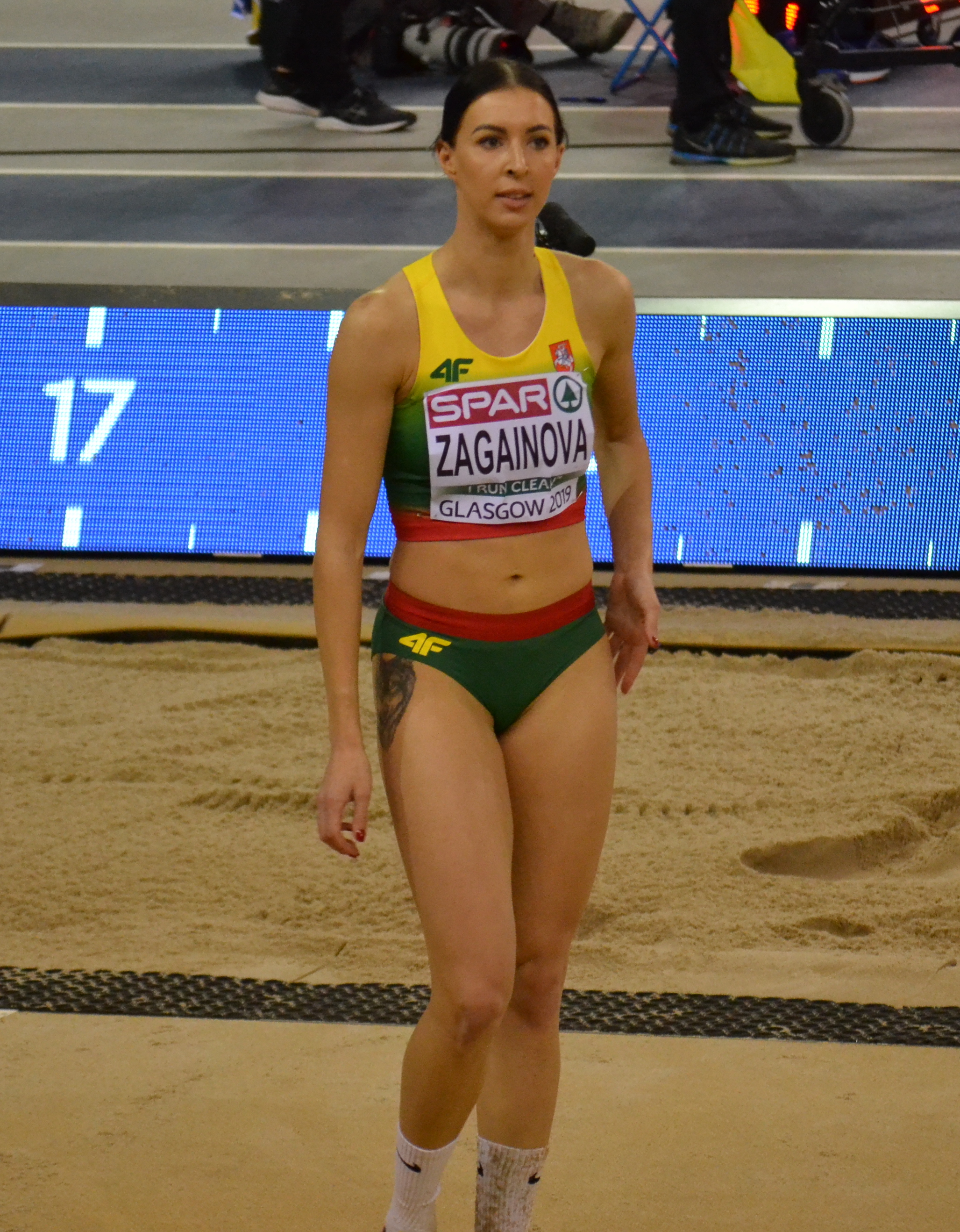

Personal information
- Born: June 20, 1997 (age 29) Vilnius, Lithuania
- Height: 1.79 m (5 ft 10 1/2 in)
- Weight: 61 kg (134 lb)

Sport
- Country: Lithuania
- Sport: Athletics
- Event: Triple Jump

Achievements and titles
- Personal bests: 14.43 (NR)
Medal record
Summer World University Games
Silver medal – second place	2021 Chengdu	Triple jump
- Updated on 30 June 2019

Diana Zagainova (born 20 June 1997 in Vilnius, Lithuania) is a Lithuanian triple jumper. She has competed at multiple major championships, including the 2020 Tokyo and 2024 Paris Olympic Games.

== Career ==
She won the Lithuanian Indoor Athletics Championships triple jump competition in 2019 with a mark of 13.97 metres. She subsequent competed at the 2019 European Athletics Indoor Championships in Glasgow, Scotland, but did not qualify for the final.

On 30 June 2019 in La Chaux-de-Fonds, Diana Zagainova broke the Lithuanian record with a mark of 14.43 m (+ 1,8 m/s). In doing so, she improved her personal best by 30 centimetres and added 17 centimetres to the previous national record set by Dovilė Dzindzaletaitė just 12 days prior. In July 2019, she jumped 13.82 metres to win the gold medal at the 2019 European Athletics U23 Championships in Gävle, Sweden.

She competed in the triple jump at the 2021 Tokyo Olympic Games.

At the 2023 European Athletics Indoor Championships in Istanbul, Turkey, she finished in fourteenth place in the qualifying of the triple jump with a best jump of 13.37 metres which was not sufficient to make the final. She won the silver medal in the triple jump at the delayed 2021 Summer World University Games held in Chengdu, China in August 2023 with a best jump of 14.02 metres.

She competed in the triple jump at the 2024 Paris Olympics, jumping 12.86 metres but did not qualify for the final.

She was selected for the 2025 European Athletics Indoor Championships in Appeldoorn, Netherlands finishing fourteenth in the qualifying round with a best jump of 13.42 metres, which was not enough to qualify for the final.

== Achievements ==
Year	Competition	Venue	Position	Notes
2016	IAAF World U20 Championships	Bydgoszcz, Poland	16th	12.41
2017	Lithuanian Championships	Palanga, Lithuania	1st	13.53
2017	Summer Universiade	Taipe, Taiwan	15th	12.56
2017	European U23 Championships	Bydgoszcz, Poland	7th	13.44
2019	European Indoor Championships	Glasgow, United Kingdom	15th	13.36
2019	European U23 Championships	Gavle, Sweden	1st	13.89
2023	Summer Universiade	Chengdu, China	2nd	14.02
