= Kadrian Goldson =

Jamaican athlete

Personal information
- Born: 8 November 1997 (age 28)

Sport
- Country: Jamaica
- Sport: Athletics
- Events: 100 metres, 200 metres
- Club: Sprintec
- Coached by: Maurice Wilson

Achievements and titles
- Personal bests: 60 m: 6.50 (2023); 100 m: 9.89 (2026); 200 m: 20.32 (2025)
Medal record
Men's athletics
Representing Jamaica
World Ultimate Championship
Second place	2026 Budapest	Mixed 4 × 100 m relay
World Relays
Gold medal – first place	2026 Gaborone	Mixed 4 × 100 m relay
NACAC Championships
Silver medal – second place	2025 Freeport	4 × 100 m relay
Bronze medal – third place	2022 Freeport	4 × 100 m relay
Summer World University Games
Gold medal – first place	2021 Chengdu	100 m

Kadrian Goldson (born 8 November 1997) is a Jamaican track and field athlete.

== Career ==
He won a bronze medal in the 4 × 100 m relay at the 2022 NACAC Championships and gold medal in the 100 metres at the 2021 Summer World University Games.

Most recently, he was part of the quartet that won gold in a World record 39.62 in the mixed 4 × 100 metres relay at the 2026 World Athletics Relays in Gaborone, Botswana.

On September 11, 2026, he help his team take silver in a time of 39.72 running the third leg at the inaugural 2026 World Athletics Ultimate Championship in Budapest, Hungary on the first day of competition.
