= Amlan Borgohain =

Indian sprinter (born 1998)

Personal information
- Born: 25 April 1998 (age 28) Jorhat, Assam, India

Sport
- Sport: Track and field
- Event(s): 100 m, 200 m
Medal record
Men's athletics
Representing India
World University Games
Bronze medal – third place	2021 Chengdu	200m

Amlan Borgohain (born 25 April 1998) is an Indian sprinter who specializes in 100 m and 200 m events.
