= Yan Haibin =

Chinese sprinter (born 2003)

Personal information
- Nationality: Chinese
- Born: January 8, 2003 (age 23) Wuzhou, Guangxi, China
- Education: Jinan University
- Height: 181 cm (5 ft 11 in)

Sport
- Country: China
- Sport: Track and field
- Event(s): 60 m, 100 m, 200 m, 4×100 m relay, 4×200 m relay

Achievements and titles
- Personal bests: 60 m: 6.75 (2024); 100 m: 10.22 (2021); 200 m: 20.56 (2021)
Medal record
Men's athletics
Representing China
Asian Games
Gold medal – first place	2022 Hangzhou	4×100 m relay
Summer World University Games
Gold medal – first place	2021 Chengdu	4×100 m relay

Yan Haibin (Chinese: 嚴海濱; born 8 January 2003) is a Chinese sprinter.

== International rankings ==
=== International ===
Haibin is the current Asian record holder of the 4 × 200 m relay.

Event	Highest ranking	Score
Men's 100m	131	1142
Men's 200m	96	1141

== 2020 Summer Olympics ==
Haibin was one of 406 Chinese athletes to compete at the 2020 Tokyo Summer Olympics. He finished fourth place in the Men's 4 × 100 m Relay.
