= Sui Gaofei =

Chinese sprinter

Personal information
- Nationality: Chinese
- Born: April 19, 2001 (age 25) Dandong, Liaoning, China
- Education: Nanjing University
- Height: 179 cm (5 ft 10 in)

Sport
- Country: China
- Sport: Track and field
- Event(s): 60 m, 100 m, 200 m, 4×100 m relay, 4×200 m relay

Achievements and titles
- Personal bests: 60 m: 6.79 (2021); 100 m: 10.27 (2023); 200 m: 20.59 (2021)
Medal record
Men's athletics
Representing China
Summer World University Games
Gold medal – first place	2021 Chengdu	4×100 m relay

Sui Gaofei (Chinese: 隋高飞; pinyin: Suí Gāofēi; born April 19, 2002) is a Chinese sprinter.

== Background ==
Sui was born in Dandong in China's Liaoning province.

Sui moved to Jiangsu province to train and in October 2018, joined the provincial track and field team. He had been training for the pole vault, but a sprinting coach noticed his potential and recruited him to sprint in the relay instead.

He currently studies at Nanjing University.
