= Shaun Maswanganyi =

South African sprinter (born 2001)

- Maswanganyi at the 2024 Penn Relays

Personal information
- Full name: Phathutshedzo Maswanganyi
- Born: 1 February 2001 (age 25) Soweto, Johannesburg, South Africa
- Height: 185 cm (6 ft 1 in)
- Weight: 77 kg (170 lb)

Sport
- Country: South Africa
- Sport: Athletics
- Events: 100 m, 200 m
- College team: Houston Cougars
- Coached by: Carl Lewis

Achievements and titles
- Personal bests: 60 m: 6.56 (2023); 100 m: 9.91 (2023); 200 m: 19.99 (2023)
Medal record
Men's athletics
Representing South Africa
Olympic Games
Silver medal – second place	2024 Paris	4×100 m relay
Summer World University Games
Silver medal – second place	2021 Chengdu	100 m
Bronze medal – third place	2021 Chengdu	4×100 m relay
African U20 Championships
Gold medal – first place	2019 Abidjan	200 m
Silver medal – second place	2019 Abidjan	100 m

Phatutshedzo “Shaun” Maswanganyi (born 1 February 2001) is a South African track and field athlete. He won silver at the 2024 Paris Olympics as part of South Africa's 4 x 100 metres relay team.

== Personal life ==
Born in Soweto, he attended St Alban’s College in Pretoria and Crawford International Pretoria. He started a finance degree at the University of Houston in 2019.

== Career ==
At the 2019 African U18 and U20 Championships in Athletics held in Abidjan, Ivory Coast, he won the silver medal in the 100 metres and the gold medal in the 200 metres. He's the current South African 60m Indoor U20 National Record holder (6.65) and current South African U20 National 100m record holder (10.06). In The American Outdoor Track & Field Championships, Maswanganyi ran the 100m in 9.87 seconds which would have been a new South African senior record had it not been wind assisted. He won gold in the 200m running a wind assisted 19.93 seconds. On 31 May 2021 he secured a double qualification for both the 100m and 200m events for the delayed 2020 Tokyo Olympics.

Maswanganyi ran a new 100m personal best time of 9.91s to finish third at the NCAA Championship final in June 2023 in Austin, Texas.

Competing in the 200 metres at the World Athletics Championships in Budapest in 2023 he qualified for the semi finals.

In February 2024, he set a new South African indoors 200m record in Texas, running 20.41 to better the mark of 20.45 by Ncincilili Titi which had stood since 2018.

He competed in the 100m and 200m at the 2024 Olympic Games, where he reached the semi-finals of both events. He also competed in the men's 4 × 100 m relay at the Games, winning silver with the South African relay team.

He finished seventh over 200 metres in May 2025 at the 2025 Doha Diamond League. He finished sixth over 100 metres at the 2025 Meeting International Mohammed VI d'Athlétisme de Rabat, also part of the 2025 Diamond League, in May 2025. He placed seventh in the 100 metres at the Diamond League Final in Zurich on 28 August. In September 2025, he competed in the men's 4 x 100 metres at the 2025 World Championships in Tokyo, Japan.
