= South Africa at the 2021 Summer World University Games =

- Flag of South Africa
- IOC code: RSA

in Chengdu, China 28 July 2023 – 8 August 2023
- Competitors: 135 (70 men and 65 women)
- Medals Ranked 19th: Gold 2 Silver 11 Bronze 7 Total 20

Summer World University Games appearances
- 1959; 1961; 1963; 1965; 1967; 1970; 1973; 1975; 1977; 1979; 1981; 1983; 1985; 1987; 1989; 1991; 1993; 1995; 1997; 1999; 2001; 2003; 2005; 2007; 2009; 2011; 2013; 2015; 2017; 2019; 2021; 2025; 2027

South Africa competed at the 2021 Summer World University Games in Chengdu, China held from 28 July to 8 August 2023.

== Medal summary ==
=== Medal by sports ===
Rank	Sports	Gold	Silver	Bronze	Total
1	Athletics	2	2	6	10
2	Swimming	0	7	0	7
3	Rowing	0	1	1	2
4	Archery	0	1	0	1
Totals (4 entries)		2	11	7	20

=== Medalists ===
Medal	Name	Sport	Event	Day
Gold	Marlie Viljoen	Athletics	Women's 400 metres	3 August
Gold	Tsebo Matsoso	Athletics	Men's 200 metres	4 August
Silver	Christian Beyers de Klerk	Archery	Men's individual compound	31 July
Silver	Shaun Maswanganyi	Athletics	Men's 100 metres	2 August
Silver	Erin Gallagher	Swimming	Women's 50 metre butterfly	2 August
Silver	Kaylene Corbett	Swimming	Women's 100 metre breaststroke	3 August
Silver	Erin Gallagher	Swimming	Women's 100 metre freestyle	3 August
Silver	Yolandi Stander	Athletics	Women's discus throw	5 August
Silver	Kaylene Corbett	Swimming	Women's 200 metre breaststroke	5 August
Silver	Erin Gallagher	Swimming	Women's 100 metre butterfly	5 August
Silver	Nadia Gaspari; Chloe Cresswell	Rowing	Lightweight women's double sculls	6 August
Silver	Duné Coetzee	Swimming	Women's 800 metre freestyle	6 August
Silver	Erin Gallagher	Swimming	Women's 50 metre freestyle	7August
Bronze	Charne Swart	Athletics	Women's 800 metres	3 August
Bronze	Jana van Schalkwyk	Athletics	Women's javelin throw	3 August
Bronze	Banele Shabangu	Athletics	Women's 200 metres	4 August
Bronze	Courtney Westley	Rowing	Women's single sculls	6 August
Bronze	Antoinette van der Merwe; Banele Shabangu; Joviale Mbisha; Tamzin Thomas	Athletics	Women's 4 × 100 metres relay	6 August
Bronze	Thembo Monareng; Tsebo Matsoso; Eckhart Potgieter; Shaun Maswanganyi	Athletics	Men's 4 × 100 metres relay	6 August
Bronze	Nhlanhla Maseko; Tjaart van der Walt; Wernich van Rensburg; Lindukuhle Gora	Athletics	Men's 4 × 400 metres relay	6 August
