= Algeria at the 2021 Summer World University Games =

- Flag of Algeria
- IOC code: ALG

in Chengdu, China 28 July 2023 – 8 August 2023
- Medals Ranked 39th: Gold 0 Silver 1 Bronze 3 Total 4

Summer World University Games appearances
- 1959; 1961; 1963; 1965; 1967; 1970; 1973; 1975; 1977; 1979; 1981; 1983; 1985; 1987; 1989; 1991; 1993; 1995; 1997; 1999; 2001; 2003; 2005; 2007; 2009; 2011; 2013; 2015; 2017; 2019; 2021; 2025; 2027

Algeria competed at the 2021 Summer World University Games in Chengdu, China held from 28 July to 8 August 2023.

Since 1963, Algeria has taken part at every Summer World University Games with the exception of 1977 Summer Universiade in Sofia and the 1987 Summer Universiade in Zagreb because of the African boycott.

== Medal summary ==
=== Medal by sports ===
Rank	Sports	Gold	Silver	Bronze	Total
1	Athletics	0	1	3	4
Totals (1 entries)		0	1	3	4

=== Medalists ===
Medal	Name	Sport	Event	Day
Silver	Oussama Cherrad	Athletics	Men's 1500 metres	3 August
Bronze	Oussama Khennousi	Athletics	Men's discus throw	2 August
Bronze	Oussama Cherrad	Athletics	Men's 800 metres	6 August
Bronze	Zine El Abidine Laggoune	Athletics	Men's 800 metres	6 August

== Judo ==
=== Men ===
Athlete	Event	Round of 32	Round of 16	Quarterfinal	Semifinal	Repechage	Final / BM	
Athlete	Event	Opposition Score	Opposition Score	Opposition Score	Opposition Score	Opposition Score	Opposition Score	Rank
Othmane Arbaoui	-100 kg	Hamed Rashidi (IRI); W 1S2-0S2	Ruslan Nasirli (AZE); L 0S2-10S2	Did not advance				N/A
Younes Ben Laribi	-60 kg	Arnal Borbashev (KGZ); W 10-0S1	Emiel Otto Jaring (NED); W 10-0S1	Yung-wei Yang (TPE); L 0-10	Emirhan Karahan (TUN); L 0s1-10	Did not advance		N/A
Chakib Khalil Boubertakh	-66 kg	Kevin Vazikakis Loforte (MOZ); W 11-0	Radu Izvoreanu (MDA); L 0s2-10s2	Did not advance				N/A
Aymen Guellil	+100 kg	Guilherme Oliveira Cabral (BRA); L 0S1-10	Did not advance					N/A
Nour Elislam Larabi	-73 kg	Eduard Zdenovec (CZE); W 10-0s2	Adil Osmanov (MDA); L 0-10	Did not advance				N/A
Mahdi Taleb	-90 kg	Mamedaly Achyldyyev (TKM); L 0-10	Did not advance					N/A
Chakib Khalil Boubertakh; Aymen Guellil; Nour Elislam Larabi; Mahdi Taleb	Men's Team	Turkey (TUR); W 0-DNS	Italy (ITA); L 3-0	Did not advance				N/A

=== Women ===
Athlete	Event	Round of 32	Round of 16	Quarterfinal	Repechage	Semifinal	Final / BM	
Athlete	Event	Opposition Score	Opposition Score	Opposition Score	Opposition Score	Opposition Score	Opposition Score	Rank
Lysa Aissaoui	-78 kg	Laura Volo Machin (ESP); L 0-10	Did not advance					
Djihene Boubidi	-48 kg	Bye	Geronay Michaela Whitebooi (RSA); L 0-10	Did not advance				N/A
Melissa Kechout	-57 kg	Immaculata Nelson Ufot (NGR); D DNS-DNS	Did not advance					N/A
Nardjis Khacir	-70 kg	Kai Iong Kuok (MAC); W 10s1-0s2 Samira Bock (GER); L 0-10	Did not advance				N/A	
Yousra Mechebbek	+78 kg	—	Erica Simonetti (ITA); L 0H-0	Did not advance				N/A
Amina Douniazed Rezoug	-63 kg	Farangiz Khojieva (UZB); L 0s2-1s1	Did not advance					N/A
Hadjet Zaidi	-52 kg	Sayara Rozyyeva (TKM); L 0-10	Did not advance					N/A
Nardjis Khacir; Yousra Mechebbek; Amina Douniazed Rezoug; Hadjer Zaidi	Women's Team	—	Netherlands (NED); L 0-3	Did not advance				N/A
