= Finland at the 2021 Summer World University Games =

- Flag of Finland
- IOC code: FIN

in Chengdu, China 28 July 2023 – 8 August 2023
- Competitors: 75 (38 men and 37 women)
- Medals Ranked 32nd: Gold 1 Silver 0 Bronze 3 Total 4

Summer World University Games appearances
- 1959; 1961; 1963; 1965; 1967; 1970; 1973; 1975; 1977; 1979; 1981; 1983; 1985; 1987; 1989; 1991; 1993; 1995; 1997; 1999; 2001; 2003; 2005; 2007; 2009; 2011; 2013; 2015; 2017; 2019; 2021; 2025; 2027

Finland competed at the 2021 Summer World University Games in Chengdu, China, held from 28 July to 8 August 2023.

== Medal summary ==
=== Medal by sports ===
Rank	Sports	Gold	Silver	Bronze	Total
1	Athletics	1	0	2	3
2	Basketball	0	0	1	1
Totals (2 entries)		1	0	3	4

=== Medalists ===
Medal	Name	Sport	Event	Day
Gold	Urho Kujanpää	Athletics	Men's pole vault	5 August
Bronze	Ebba Pekonen; Sara Bejedi; Veera Pirttinen; Elina Koskimies; Roosa Lehtoranta; Lotta Lahtinen / Lotta Vehka-Aho; Roosa Kosonen; Teresa Seppälä; Helmi Tulonen; Janette Aarnio; Saana Kujala	Basketball	Women's tournament	5 August
Bronze	Topias Laine	Athletics	Men's javelin throw	6 August
Bronze	Venla Pulkkanen	Athletics	Women's high jump	6 August
