= Uganda at the 2021 Summer World University Games =

- Flag of Uganda
- IOC code: UGA

in Chengdu, China 28 July 2023 – 8 August 2023
- Competitors: 34 (21 men and 13 women)
- Medals Ranked 29th: Gold 1 Silver 1 Bronze 0 Total 2

Summer World University Games appearances
- 1959; 1961; 1963; 1965; 1967; 1970; 1973; 1975; 1977; 1979; 1981; 1983; 1985; 1987; 1989; 1991; 1993; 1995; 1997; 1999; 2001; 2003; 2005; 2007; 2009; 2011; 2013; 2015; 2017; 2019; 2021; 2025; 2027

Uganda competed at the 2021 Summer World University Games in Chengdu, China held from 28 July to 8 August 2023.

== Medal summary ==
=== Medal by sports ===
| Rank | Sports | Gold | Silver | Bronze | Total |
|---|---|---|---|---|---|
| 1 | Athletics | 1 | 1 | 0 | 2 |
| Totals (1 entries) | | 1 | 1 | 0 | 2 |

=== Medalists ===
| Medal | Name | Sport | Event | Day |
|---|---|---|---|---|
| Gold | Dismas Yeko | Athletics | Men's 10,000 metres | 2 August |
| Silver | Knight Aciru | Athletics | Women's 800 metres | 3 August |
