= Colombia at the 2021 Summer World University Games =

- Flag of Colombia
- IOC code: COL

in Chengdu, China 28 July 2023 – 8 August 2023
- Competitors: 2 (8 men and 17 women)
- Medals: Gold 0 Silver 0 Bronze 0 Total 0

Summer World University Games appearances
- 1959; 1961; 1963; 1965; 1967; 1970; 1973; 1975; 1977; 1979; 1981; 1983; 1985; 1987; 1989; 1991; 1993; 1995; 1997; 1999; 2001; 2003; 2005; 2007; 2009; 2011; 2013; 2015; 2017; 2019; 2021; 2025; 2027

Colombia competed at the 2021 Summer World University Games in Chengdu, China held from 28 July to 8 August 2023.

== Competitors ==
Sport	Men	Women	Total
Athletics	1	1	2
Swimming	2	0	2
Table tennis	0	1	1
Taekwondo	2	4	6
Tennis	3	1	4
Volleyball	0	10	10
Total	8	17	25

== Athletics ==
Men

Athlete	Event	Heat		Semi-finals		Final	
Athlete	Event	Result	Rank	Result	Rank	Result	Rank
Daniel Lara	800 metres	2:03.10	36	Did not advance			
Daniel Lara	1500 metres	4:14.004	26	—		Did not advance	

Women

Athlete	Event	Heat		Semi-finals		Final	
Athlete	Event	Result	Rank	Result	Rank	Result	Rank
Estefania Aristizabal	5000 metre	18:16.22	17 Q	—		18:08.03	15
Estefania Aristizabal	10,000 metres	—				Did not finish	

== Swimming ==
Men

Athlete	Event	Heat		Semi-finals		Final	
Athlete	Event	Time	Rank	Time	Rank	Time	Rank
Andrés Muñoz	50 metre breaststroke	30.19	40	Did not advance			
Andrés Muñoz	100 metre breaststroke	1:05.89	35	Did not advance			
Andrés Muñoz	200 metre breaststroke	2:21.79	24	Did not advance			
Andrés Muñoz	400 metre individual medley	Did not start					
Sebastián Ospina	100 metre freestyle	54.06	47	Did not advance			
Sebastián Ospina	200 metre freestyle	1:57.65	34	Did not advance			
Sebastián Ospina	50 metre butterfly	25.57	34	Did not advance			
Sebastián Ospina	100 metre butterfly	56.84	32	Did not advance			
Sebastián Ospina	200 metre butterfly	2:03.60	15 Q	2:03.97	15	Did not advance	

== Table tennis ==
Athlete	Event	Group round				Round of 64	Round of 32	Round of 16	Quarterfinal	Semifinal	Final / BM	
Athlete	Event	Opposition Result	Opposition Result	Opposition Result	Rank	Opposition Result	Opposition Result	Opposition Result	Opposition Result	Opposition Result	Opposition Result	Rank
Alejandra Alzate	Women's singles	Saidmuratkhanova (KAZ); L 2–3	Hessenthaler (GER); L 1–3	Kahraman (TUR); L 0–3	4	Did not advance						

== Taekwondo ==
Kyorugi

Athlete	Event	Round of 32	Round of 16	Quarter-finals	Semi-finals	Final	
Athlete	Event	Opponent score	Opponent score	Opponent score	Opponent score	Opponent score	Rank
Jorge Domínguez	Men's 58 kg	Bye	Sainbileg (MGL); L 0–2	Did not advance			
Camila Flórez	Women's 49 kg	Bye	Murakami (JPN); L 0–2	Did not advance			
Melissa Echeverri	Women's 53 kg	Bye	Park (KOR); L 0–2	Did not advance			
Melissa Gualdron	Women's 67 kg	Bye	Mirhosseini (IRI); L 0–2	Did not advance			

Poomsae

Athlete	Event	Preliminary		Semi-finals		Final	
Athlete	Event	Score	Rank	Score	Rank	Score	Rank
Alexander Colorado	Men's individual	6.910	5 Q	6.880	12	Did not advance	
Paulina Arango	Women's individual	5.900	12	Did not advance			
Paulina Arango; Melissa Gualdron; Melissa Echeverri	Women's team	5.960	14	Did not advance			
Alexander Colorado; Paulina Arango	Mixed pairs	6.390	8	Did not advance			

== Tennis ==
Athlete	Event	Round of 64	Round of 32	Round of 16	Quarter-finals	Semi-finals	Final	
Athlete	Event	Opponent score	Opponent score	Opponent score	Opponent score	Opponent score	Opponent score	Rank
Camilo González	Men's singles	Bye	Charoenphon (THA); L 0–2	Did not advance				
Alejandro Moncada	Men's singles	Reis (POR); L 0–2	Did not advance					
Maria Padilla	Women's singles	Ingale (IND); W 2–1	Chanta (THA); L 0–2	Did not advance				
Alejandro Moncada; Manuel Montoya	Men's doubles	—	Gue /Zhao (CHN); L 0–2	Did not advance				
Camilo González; Maria Padilla	Men's doubles	—	Mirzaganiev /Musabekova (UZB); L 1–2	Did not advance				
Camilo González	Men's consolation	—	Bye	Desvianto (INA); L 1–2	Did not advance			
Alejandro Moncada	Men's consolation	—	Bye	Hamayangwe (ZAM); W 2–0	Hans (IND); L 0–2	Did not advance		

== Volleyball ==
Summary

Team	Event	Group stage				Quarter-finals	Semi-finals	Final / BM	
Team	Event	Opponent score	Opponent score	Opponent score	Rank	Opponent score	Opponent score	Opponent score	Rank
(Colombia) Women's team	Women's tournament	Czech Republic (CZE); L 0–3	Japan (JPN); L 0–3	—	3	—	Argentina (ARG); L 0–3	India (IND); W 3–0	11
