= China at the 2021 Summer World University Games =

- Flag of China
- IOC code: CHN

in Chengdu, China 28 July 2023 – 8 August 2023
- Flag bearers: Guo Hanyu (Tennis); Hu Zhenzhuo (Volleyball)
- Medals Ranked 1st: Gold 103 Silver 40 Bronze 35 Total 178

Summer World University Games appearances
- 1979; 1981; 1983; 1985; 1987; 1989; 1991; 1993; 1995; 1997; 1999; 2001; 2003; 2005; 2007; 2009; 2011; 2013; 2015; 2017; 2019; 2021; 2025; 2027

China competed at the 2021 Summer World University Games in Chengdu, China held from 28 July to 8 August 2023.

== Medal summary ==
=== Medal by sports ===
Rank	Sports	Gold	Silver	Bronze	Total
1	Swimming	18	0	2	20
2	Diving	15	5	1	21
3	Wushu	11	0	1	12
4	Athletics	10	8	7	25
5	Artistic gymnastics	9	5	1	15
6	Taekwondo	7	5	7	19
7	Table tennis	7	3	3	13
8	Shooting	6	4	5	15
9	Badminton	4	3	1	8
10	Rowing	4	2	4	10
11	Fencing	3	1	2	6
12	Rhythmic gymnastics	2	1	0	3
13	Archery	2	0	0	2
14	Tennis	1	3	0	4
15	Volleyball	1	0	1	2
16	Basketball	1	0	0	1
16	Judo	1	0	0	1
16	Water polo	1	0	0	1
Totals (18 entries)		103	40	35	178

=== Medalists ===
Medal	Name	Sport	Event	Day
Gold	Jin Zhedian	Wushu	Men's changquan	29 July
Gold	Cao Maoyuan	Wushu	Men's nangun	29 July
Gold	Song Cuifang	Wushu	Women's nandao	29 July
Gold	Chen Xiaoli	Wushu	Women's taijiquan	29 July
Gold	Duan Zhicheng; Xia Qi; Liu Shuai	Shooting	Men's team 25 metre rapid fire pistol	30 July
Gold	Lin Xinmiao; Liu Yukun; Wang Yuefeng	Shooting	Men's team 50 metre rifle three positions	30 July
Gold	Du Meiyu; Chen Yansong; Wang Shikun	Archery	Men's team compound	30 July
Gold	Zhou Danyan; Wang Limin; Li Xinxin	Archery	Women's team recurve	30 July
Gold	Chen Jiaqi; Chen Minshan; Li Xuerui; Xiao Mingxin; Yan Zhiting; Zhao Hongyu	Rhythmic gymnastics	Women's group all-around	30 July
Gold	Liang Jie; Liu Siyue	Taekwondo	Mixed team poomsae	30 July
Gold	Jin Zhedian	Wushu	Men's daoshu	30 July
Gold	Cao Maoyuan	Wushu	Men's nanquan	30 July
Gold	Chen Xiaoli	Wushu	Women's taijijian	30 July
Gold	Chen Jiaqi; Chen Minshan; Xiao Mingxin; Yan Zhiting; Zhao Hongyu	Rhythmic gymnastics	Women's group 5 hoops	31 July
Gold	Huang Bowen; Liang Chaohui	Diving	Men's synchronized 3 metre springboard	31 July
Gold	Zhang Jiaqi; Zhang Minjie	Diving	Women's synchronized 10 metre platform	31 July
Gold	Jia Chundi	Judo	Women's +78 kg	31 July
Gold	Hu Kai	Shooting	Men's 10 metre air pistol	1 August
Gold	Xiong Yaxuan; Wang Keyi; Lin Yaxi	Shooting	Women's team 25 metre pistol	1 August
Gold	Chen Jia	Diving	Women's 1 metre springboard	1 August
Gold	Xia Yuyu	Athletics	Women's 10,000 metres	1 August
Gold	Song Jiayuan	Athletics	Women's shot put	1 August
Gold	Li Bingjie; Liu Yaxin; Luo Youyang; Zhang Yufei; Zhang Yifan	Swimming	Women's 4 x 100 metre freestyle relay	1 August
Gold	He Zhuojia; Qian Tianyi; Wang Xiaotong; Yang Shilu; Zhao Shang	Table tennis	Women's team	1 August
Gold	Liu Dingshuo; Man Pai; Xue Fei; Xu Yingbin; Zhou Kai	Table tennis	Men's team	1 August
Gold	Song Jie	Taekwondo	Women's 67 kg	1 August
Gold	Zhang Kai	Taekwondo	Men's 80 kg	1 August
Gold	Zhang Yu; Song Buhan	Shooting	Mixed team 10 metre air rifle	2 August
Gold	Zhang Qi; Hu Kai	Shooting	Mixed team 10 metre air pistol	2 August
Gold	Zhang Wenao	Diving	Men's 3 metre springboard	2 August
Gold	Zou Jingyuan; Shi Cong; Su Weide; Lan Xingyu; Zhang Boheng	Artistic gymnastics	Men's team all-around	2 August
Gold	Zhang Yufei	Swimming	Women's 50 metre butterfly	2 August
Gold	Qin Haiyang	Swimming	Men's 100 metre breaststroke	2 August
Gold	Liu Yaxin	Swimming	Women's 200 metre backstroke	2 August
Gold	Wang Gukailai; Qin Haiyang; Zhang Yufei; Li Bingjie / Song Jiale; Lin Tao; Jing Shangbeihua; Liu Yaxin	Swimming	Mixed 4 x 100 metre medley relay	2 August
Gold	Xu Lei	Taekwondo	Women's +73 kg	2 August
Gold	Wang Weiying	Diving	Women's 10 metre platform	3 August
Gold	Wang Weiying; Yang Ling	Diving	Mixed synchronized 3 metre springboard	3 August
Gold	Huang Zigan; Yang Ling	Diving	Men's synchronized 10 metre platform	3 August
Gold	Ou Yushan; Wei Xiaoyuan; Du Siyu; Zhang Jin; Luo Huan	Artistic gymnastics	Women's team all-around	3 August
Gold	Su Wen	Athletics	Men's triple jump	3 August
Gold	Zhang Yufei	Swimming	Women's 100 metre freestyle	3 August
Gold	Liu Dingshuo; Qian Tianyi	Table tennis	Mixed doubles	3 August
Gold	Zhou Zeqi	Taekwondo	Women's 73 kg	3 August
Gold	Meng Mingkuan	Taekwondo	Men's 87 kg	3 August
Gold	Ma Yigu	Wushu	Men's 60 kg	3 August
Gold	He Feng	Wushu	Men's 70 kg	3 August
Gold	Liu Wenlong	Wushu	Men's 80 kg	3 August
Gold	Li Zhiqin	Wushu	Women's 60 kg	3 August
Gold	Chen Jia; Yang Ruilin	Diving	Women's synchronized 3 metre springboard	4 August
Gold	Wang Weiying; Wang Binhan	Diving	Mixed synchronized 10 metre platform	4 August
Gold	Chao Yaqi	Fencing	Women's individual sabre	4 August
Gold	Zhang Boheng	Artistic gymnastics	Men's individual all-around	4 August
Gold	Ou Yushan	Artistic gymnastics	Women's individual all-around	4 August
Gold	Wang Qi	Athletics	Men's hammer throw	4 August
Gold	Li Bingjie	Swimming	Women's 1500 metre freestyle	4 August
Gold	Qin Haiyang	Swimming	Men's 200 metre breaststroke	4 August
Gold	Liu Yaxin; Jing Shangbeihua; Zhang Yufei; Li Bingjie / Gao Xing; Zhang Yifan; Chen Keyi	Swimming	Women's 4 x 200 metre freestyle relay	4 August
Gold	Qian Tianyi; Zhao Shang	Table tennis	Women's doubles	4 August
Gold	Xu Yingbin; Xue Fei	Table tennis	Men's doubles	4 August
Gold	Liu Junhong; Song Jie; Yang Junli; Zhou Zeqi	Taekwondo	Women's team kyorugi	4 August
Gold	Gao Lan; Ji Jie; Liu Roumei; Yin Lamei	Athletics	Women's 20 kilometres walk team	5 August
Gold	Qian Haifeng; Cui Lihong; Li Yandong; Zhang Hongliang; Li Xiaobin	Athletics	Men's 20 kilometres walk team	5 August
Gold	Qian Tianyi	Table tennis	Women's singles	5 August
Gold	Zhou Kai	Table tennis	Men's singles	5 August
Gold	Du Siyu	Artistic gymnastics	Women's uneven bars	5 August
Gold	Lan Xingyu	Artistic gymnastics	Men'srings	5 August
Gold	Tai Xiaohu	Diving	Men's 1 metre springboard	5 August
Gold	Li Jiangyan	Athletics	Women's hammer throw	5 August
Gold	Li Shuangfei; Zhang Jingyi; Li Yifan; Su Yuanyuan; Zhang Tao; Tang Ziting / Cao Boyi; Zhang Mao; Han Xu; Liu Yutong; Jia Saiqi; Song Kexin	Basketball	Women's tournament	5 August
Gold	Ou Yushan	Artistic gymnastics	Women's balance beam	5 August
Gold	Zou Jingyuan	Artistic gymnastics	Men's parallel bars	5 August
Gold	Ou Yushan	Artistic gymnastics	Women's floor	5 August
Gold	Li Shanshan; Shi Yuexin; Tang Junyao; Xu Nuo	Fencing	Women's team épée	5 August
Gold	Zhang Yufei	Swimming	Women's 100 metre butterfly	5 August
Gold	Chen Juner; Lin Tao; Li Bingjie; Zhang Yufei / Zhao Xinchen; Luo Youyang; Chen Mingjie; Ma Yiyi	Swimming	Mixed 4 x 100 metre freestyle relay	5 August
Gold	Zhou Yuxiu; Zhang Peixin	Rowing	Women's coxless pair	6 August
Gold	Song Chunxiao; Zong Zhaoshan; Liu Jiangyu; Xiao Yang	Rowing	Men's coxless four	6 August
Gold	Zhang Shuxian; Liu Xiaoxin; Wang Zifeng; Xu Xingye	Rowing	Women's coxless four	6 August
Gold	Ju Wenjun; Xia Keke; Zhao Xuanyi; Wen Jiayi; Zhang Shuxian / Zhao Xingyue; Wang Zifeng; Wu Yihui; Song Jiayi	Rowing	Women's eight	6 August
Gold	Guo Hanyu	Tennis	Women's singles	6 August
Gold	Yang Ruilin	Diving	Women's 3 metre springboard	6 August
Gold	Chen Qingyuan; Fu Yiting; Huang Qianqian	Fencing	Women's team foil	6 August
Gold	Liang Xiaojing; Ge Manqi; Cai Yanting; Li Yuting; Li He	Athletics	Women's 4 × 100 metres relay	6 August
Gold	Zhang Jingqiang	Athletics	Men's long jump	6 August
Gold	Chen Jiapeng; Chen Guanfeng; Yan Haibin; Deng Zhijian; Sui Gaofei	Athletics	Men's 4 × 100 metres relay	6 August
Gold	Li Bingjie	Swimming	Women's 800 metre freestyle	6 August
Gold	Liu Yaxin	Swimming	Women's 200 metre freestyle	6 August
Gold	Qin Haiyang	Swimming	Men's 50 metre breaststroke	6 August
Gold	Zhang Shiqi; Ma Wanyue; Xie Shengyu; Xu Jianan; Wu Mengjie; Gao Yi / Zhong Hui; Xu Xiaoting; Zhuang Yushan; Wang Wenhan; Zhou Yetong; Miao Yiwen	Volleyball	Women's tournament	6 August
Gold	Huang Zigan	Diving	Men's 10 metre platform	7 August
Gold	Huang Zigan; Wang Weiying	Diving	Mixed team	7 August
Gold	Chen Jia; Ouyang Yu; Wang Weiying; Yang Ruilin / Zhang Jiaqi; Zhang Minjie; Zhang Rui	Diving	Women's team	7 August
Gold	Han Yue	Badminton	Women's singles	7 August
Gold	Chen Jia; Huang Bowen; Huang Zigan; Liang Chaohui; Shi Zhenyu / Tai Xiaohu; Wang Binhan; Yang Ling; Zhang Wenao	Diving	Men's team	7 August
Gold	Li Wenmei; Liu Xuanxuan	Badminton	Women's doubles	7 August
Gold	Ren Xiangyu; Tan Qiang	Badminton	Men's doubles	7 August
Gold	Wang Zhengxing	Badminton	Men's singles	7 August
Gold	Zhang Yufei	Swimming	Women's 50 metre freestyle	7 August
Gold	Li Bingjie	Swimming	Women's 400 metre freestyle	7 August
Gold	Liu Yaxin; Zhu Leiju; Zhang Yufei; Li Bingjie / Zheng Muyan; Luo Youyang; Jing Shangbeihua; Gao Xing	Swimming	Women's 4 x 100 metre medley relay	7 August
Gold	Wang Gukailai; Qin Haiyang; Chen Juner; Lin Tao / Zhang Zhoujian; Yu Zongda; Wang Yi	Swimming	Men's 4 x 100 metre medley relay	7 August
Gold	Dong Wenxin; Yan Siya; Pan Xiuhua; Xiong Dunhan; Zhai Ying; Wang Shiyun; Lu Yiwen / Wang Huan; Zhong Qiyun; Nong Sanfeng; Chen Xiao; Zhang Jing; Du Xinyue	Water polo	Women's tournament	7 August
Silver	Lin Yaxi; Zhang Qi; Wang Keyi	Shooting	Women's team 10 metre air pistol	29 July
Silver	Hu Mingda	Taekwondo	Men's individual poomsae	29 July
Silver	Hu Mingda; Yang Lei; Liu Siyue	Taekwondo	Men's team poomsae	30 July
Silver	Liu Yuqing; Liang Jie; Li Wan	Taekwondo	Women's team poomsae	30 July
Silver	Li Xinmiao; Song Buhan; Zhu Xiaozhong	Shooting	Men's team 10 metre air rifle	31 July
Silver	Chen Jiaqi; Chen Minshan; Li Xuerui; Xiao Mingxin; Zhao Hongyu	Rhythmic gymnastics	Women's group 3 ribbons + 2 balls	31 July
Silver	Hu Kai; Xu Zhanyi; Zhang Bingchen	Shooting	Men's team 10 metre air pistol	1 August
Silver	Shi Mengyao; Wang Zeru; Xing Hang	Shooting	Women's team 50 metre rifle three position	1 August
Silver	Wang Yi	Diving	Women's 1 metre springboard	1 August
Silver	Liang Chaohui	Diving	Men's 3 metre springboard	2 August
Silver	Dong Tianyao; Du Yue; Han Yue; He Jiting; Li Wenmei; Liu Xuanxuan / Ren Xiangyu; Tan Qiang; Wang Zhengxing; Xia Yuting; Zhang Yiman; Zhou Haodong	Badminton	Mixed team	2 August
Silver	Cui Yang	Taekwondo	Men's 74 kg	2 August
Silver	Zhang Rui	Diving	Women's 10 metre platform	3 August
Silver	Su Lingdan	Athletics	Women's javelin throw	3 August
Silver	Xue Fei; Wang Xiaotong	Table tennis	Mixed doubles	3 August
Silver	Liang Yushuai	Taekwondo	Men's 63 kg	3 August
Silver	Shi Cong	Artistic gymnastics	Men's individual all-around	4 August
Silver	Luo Huan	Artistic gymnastics	Women's individual all-around	4 August
Silver	Yanni Wu	Athletics	Women's 100 metres hurdles	4 August
Silver	Chen Qiaoling	Athletics	Women's pole vault	4 August
Silver	He Zhuojia; Wang Xiaotong	Table tennis	Women's doubles	4 August
Silver	Qian Haifeng	Athletics	Men's 20 kilometres walk	5 August
Silver	Guo Hanyu; Jiang Xinyu	Tennis	Women's doubles	5 August
Silver	Xu Yingbin	Table tennis	Men's singles	5 August
Silver	Zou Jingyuan	Artistic gymnastics	Men'srings	5 August
Silver	Luo Huan	Artistic gymnastics	Women's balance beam	5 August
Silver	Shi Cong	Artistic gymnastics	Men's horizontal bar	5 August
Silver	Xu Xinying	Athletics	Women's hammer throw	5 August
Silver	Xia Yuyu	Athletics	Women's 5000 metres	5 August
Silver	Ning Xiaohan	Athletics	Men's 110 metres hurdles	5 August
Silver	Chen Weichun	Rowing	Men's single sculls	6 August
Silver	Ni Xulin; Zhang Songhu	Rowing	Men's coxless pair	6 August
Silver	Yang Kegu; Ma Rui; Ma Yujie; Wang Congzheng; Chen Tianyu	Athletics	Men's half marathon team	6 August
Silver	Jin Yuquan; Tang Qianhui	Tennis	Mixed doubles	6 August
Silver	Guo Hanyu; Jiang Xinyu; Tang Qianhui; Zheng Wushuang	Tennis	Women's team classification	6 August
Silver	Ouyang Yu	Diving	Women's 3 metre springboard	6 August
Silver	Lan Minghao; Wang Zijie; Xiu Yuhan; Yu Lefan	Fencing	Men's team épée	6 August
Silver	Yang Ling	Diving	Men's 10 metre platform	7 August
Silver	Du Yue; Xia Yuting	Badminton	Women's doubles	7 August
Silver	He Jiting; Zhou Haodong	Badminton	Men's doubles	7 August
Bronze	Xing Hang	Shooting	Women's 10 metre air rifle	29 July
Bronze	Xing Hang; Zhang Yu; Gu Xinyu	Shooting	Women's team 10 metre air rifle	29 July
Bronze	Song Cuifang	Wushu	Women's nanquan	30 July
Bronze	Song Buhan	Shooting	Men's 10 metre air rifle	31 July
Bronze	Xie Xueting	Taekwondo	Women's 46 kg	31 July
Bronze	Yang Junli	Taekwondo	Women's 57 kg	31 July
Bronze	Xiao Chenming	Taekwondo	Men's 68 kg	31 July
Bronze	Xiong Yaxuan	Shooting	Women's 25 metre pistol	1 August
Bronze	Wang Zeru	Shooting	Women's 50 metre rifle three positions	1 August
Bronze	Miaoyi Lua	Taekwondo	Women's 49 kg	1 August
Bronze	Chen Guanfeng	Athletics	Men's 100 metres	2 August
Bronze	Liu Guicheng	Taekwondo	Men's +87 kg	2 August
Bronze	Xiu Yuhan	Fencing	Men's individual épée	3 August
Bronze	Chen Qingyuan	Fencing	Women's individual foil	3 August
Bronze	Huang Huafeng	Athletics	Men's triple jump	3 August
Bronze	Guo Qing	Taekwondo	Women's 53 kg	3 August
Bronze	Xie Zhiyu	Athletics	Men's 400 metres hurdles	4 August
Bronze	Chen Juner	Swimming	Men's 200 metre butterfly	4 August
Bronze	Liu Dingshuo; Zhou Kai	Table tennis	Men's doubles	4 August
Bronze	Cui Yang; Liang Yushuai; Meng Mingkuan; Xiao Chenming	Taekwondo	Men's team kyorugi	4 August
Bronze	Gao Lan	Athletics	Women's 20 kilometres walk	5 August
Bronze	Zhao Shang	Table tennis	Women's singles	5 August
Bronze	Xue Fei	Table tennis	Men's singles	5 August
Bronze	Luo Huan	Artistic gymnastics	Women's uneven bars	5 August
Bronze	Shi Zhenyu	Diving	Men's 1 metre springboard	5 August
Bronze	Xie Yuchen	Athletics	Women's discus throw	5 August
Bronze	Zhu Leiju	Swimming	Women's 200 metre breaststroke	5 August
Bronze	Sun Hongjing	Rowing	Women's single sculls	6 August
Bronze	Tang Haiqi	Rowing	Lightweight men's single sculls	6 August
Bronze	Ni Xulin; Chen Weichun	Rowing	Men's double sculls	6 August
Bronze	Su Yuheng; Chen Xingrong; Bai Han; Zong Zhaoshan; Shan Hongji / Sun Simiao; Ge Jiali; Meng Yincen; Sheng Zixin	Rowing	Men's eight	6 August
Bronze	Yang Kegu	Athletics	Men's half marathon	6 August
Bronze	Luo Xia; Niu Lihua; Xia Yuyu; Wang Jiali	Athletics	Women's half marathon team	6 August
Bronze	Zhang Yiman	Badminton	Women's singles	7 August
Bronze	Chen Leiyang; Wang Hebin; Zhang Jingyin; Yu Yuantai; Wang Bin; Deng Xinpeng / Peng Shikun; Li Yongzhen; Wang Dongchen; Zhang Guanhua; Yang Yiming; Hu Zhenzhuo	Volleyball	Men's tournament	7 August
