= Tajikistan at the 2021 Summer World University Games =

- Flag of Tajikistan
- IOC code: TJK

in Chengdu, China 28 July 2023 – 8 August 2023
- Competitors: 5 (4 men and 1 woman)
- Medals: Gold 0 Silver 0 Bronze 0 Total 0

Summer World University Games appearances
- 1959; 1961; 1963; 1965; 1967; 1970; 1973; 1975; 1977; 1979; 1981; 1983; 1985; 1987; 1989; 1991; 1993; 1995; 1997; 1999; 2001; 2003; 2005; 2007; 2009; 2011; 2013; 2015; 2017; 2019; 2021; 2025; 2027

Tajikistan competed at the 2021 Summer World University Games in Chengdu, China held from 28 July to 8 August 2023.

== Competitors ==
Sport	Men	Women	Total
Athletics	0	1	1
Judo	4	0	4
Total	4	1	5

== Athletics ==
Women

Athlete	Event	Heat		Semi-finals		Final	
Athlete	Event	Result	Rank	Result	Rank	Result	Rank
Rajabmo Abdulloeva	5000 metres	20:21.77	18 Q	—		19:50.51	16

== Judo ==
Athlete	Event	Round of 32	Round of 16	Quarter-finals	Semi-finals	Repechage	Final / BM	
Athlete	Event	Opponent score	Opponent score	Opponent score	Opponent score	Opponent score	Opponent score	Rank
Ulugbek Rakhimov	Men's +100 kg	Ghangas (IND); W 10–00	Kim (KOR); L 00–10	Did not advance				
Mansur Rahmon	Men's 100 kg	Turansky (SVK); W 01–00	Green (JPN); L 00–10	Did not advance				
Shodmon Rizoev	Men's 81 kg	Bye	Qing (CHN); W 01–00	Imamverdiev (AZE); W 10–00	Hojo (JPN); L 00–10	—	Dvalashvili (GEO); L 01–10	5
Shahboz Saidaburorov	Men's 66 kg	Ndlondlo (RSA); W 10–00	Monteagudo (ARG); W 10–00	Nutfulloev (UZB); W 01–00	Izvoreanu (MDA); L 00–01	—	Najafov (AZE); L 00–01	5
