= Japan at the 2021 Summer World University Games =

- Flag of Japan
- IOC code: JPN

in Chengdu, China 28 July 2023 – 8 August 2023
- Medals Ranked 2nd: Gold 21 Silver 29 Bronze 43 Total 93

Summer World University Games appearances
- 1959; 1961; 1963; 1965; 1967; 1970; 1973; 1975; 1977; 1979; 1981; 1983; 1985; 1987; 1989; 1991; 1993; 1995; 1997; 1999; 2001; 2003; 2005; 2007; 2009; 2011; 2013; 2015; 2017; 2019; 2021; 2025; 2027

Japan competed at the 2021 Summer World University Games in Chengdu, China held from 28 July to 8 August 2023.

== Medal summary ==
=== Medal by sports ===
Rank	Sports	Gold	Silver	Bronze	Total
1	Judo	11	3	1	15
2	Swimming	4	5	8	17
3	Artistic gymnastics	2	5	6	13
4	Athletics	2	4	5	11
5	Rhythmic gymnastics	1	1	3	5
6	Archery	1	1	0	2
7	Table tennis	0	3	3	6
8	Diving	0	2	3	5
8	Wushu	0	2	3	5
10	Basketball	0	1	0	1
10	Rowing	0	1	0	1
10	Volleyball	0	1	0	1
13	Tennis	0	0	5	5
14	Badminton	0	0	3	3
14	Fencing	0	0	3	3
Totals (15 entries)		21	29	43	93

=== Medalists ===
Medal	Name	Sport	Event	Date
Gold	Hikari Yoshioka	Judo	Women's 48 kg	July 29
Gold	Taiki Nakamura	Judo	Men's 60 kg	July 29
Gold	Hibiki Shiraishi	Judo	Women's 52 kg	July 29
Gold	Shinsei Hattori	Judo	Men's 66 kg	July 29
Gold	Kirari Yamaguchi	Judo	Women's 63 kg	July 30
Gold	Tatsuki Ishihara	Judo	Men's 73 kg	July 30
Gold	Tetsuya Aoshima; Waka Sonoda	Archery	Mixed team recurve	July 30
Gold	Mayu Honda	Judo	Women's 70 kg	July 30
Gold	Yoshito Hojo	Judo	Men's 81 kg	July 30
Gold	Kyoka Hayashi; Yuka Ishii; Saya Nishiyama; Yuri Shimada; Mio Takii	Rhythmic gymnastics	Women's group 3 ribbons + 2 balls	July 31
Gold	Mizuki Sugimura	Judo	Women's 78 kg	July 31
Gold	Hikari Yoshioka; Hibiki Shiraishi; Akari Omori; Kirari Yamaguchi; Mayu Honda; Mizuki Sugimura; Mao Arai	Judo	Women's team	August 1
Gold	Taiki Nakamura; Shinsei Hattori; Tatsuki Ishihara; Yoshito Hojo; Kazuki Nakanishi; Kalanikaito Green; Yuta Nakamura	Judo	Men's team	August 1
Gold	Ichika Kajimoto	Swimming	Women's 400 m individual medley	August 1
Gold	Takumi Terada	Swimming	Men's 200 m butterfly	August 4
Gold	Kazuma Kaya	Artistic gymnastics	Men's floor	August 5
Gold	Shoko Miyata	Artistic gymnastics	Women's vault	August 5
Gold	Ken Toyoda	Athletics	Men's 110 m hurdles	August 5
Gold	Hikaru Kitagawa	Athletics	Women's half marathon	August 6
Gold	Konosuke Yanagimoto; Ikki Imoto; Shui Kurokawa; Genki Terakado; Temma Watanabe	Swimming	Men's 4 x 200 m freestyle relay	August 6
Gold	Kaito Tabuchi	Swimming	Men's 400 mindividual medley	August 7
Silver	Moka Furukawa	Wushu	Women's changquan	July 29
Silver	Rise Shoji	Wushu	Women's taijiquan	July 29
Silver	Akari Omori	Judo	Women's 57 kg	July 29
Silver	Kyoka Hayashi; Yuka Ishii; Saya Nishiyama; Yuri Shimada; Mio Takii	Rhythmic gymnastics	Women's group 5 hoops	July 31
Silver	Yuki Kawata	Archery	Men's individual recurve	July 31
Silver	Kalanikaito Green	Judo	Men's 100 kg	July 31
Silver	Yuta Nakamura	Judo	Men's +100 kg	July 31
Silver	Korono Aoi; Funaba Sayaka; Idesawa Kyoka; Motoyi Akari; Kimura Kasumi	Table tennis	Women's team	August 1
Silver	Daiki Hashimoto; Shohei Kawakami; Kazuma Kaya; Kazuki Minami; Kaito Sugimoto	Artistic gymnastics	Men's team all-around	August 2
Silver	Ayaka Sakaguchi; Shoko Miyata; Kokoro Fukasawa; Kohane Ushioku; Chiaki Hatakeda	Artistic gymnastics	Women's team all-around	August 3
Silver	Kaito Tabuchi	Swimming	Men's 1500 m freestyle	August 3
Silver	Kazuki Hamada; Yuma Tanigaki	Table tennis	Men's doubles	August 4
Silver	Karen Yamasaki; Reo Nishida	Diving	Mixed synchronized 10 m platform	August 4
Silver	Ichika Kajimoto	Swimming	Women's 1500 m freestyle	August 4
Silver	Yu Hanaguruma	Swimming	Men's 200 m breaststroke	August 4
Silver	Yudai Nishi	Athletics	Men's 200 m	August 4
Silver	Haruki Manju; Kazuhiro Tateiwa; Kento Yoshikawa	Athletics	Men's 20 km walk team	August 5
Silver	Kyoka Idesawa	Table tennis	Women's singles	August 5
Silver	Ayaka Sakaguchi	Artistic gymnastics	Women's vault	August 5
Silver	Kaito Tabuchi	Swimming	Men's 800 m freestyle	August 5
Silver	Yua Emura; Maho Hayashi; Mona Tateyama; Azusa Asahina; Saori Yasue; Maika Miura; Ufuoma Tanaka; Minami Ikematsu; Maho Awatani; Sayaka Suzuoki; Miyu Okamoto; Nanami Morioka	Basketball	Women's tournament	August 5
Silver	Kaito Sugimoto	Artistic gymnastics	Men's parallel bars	August 5
Silver	Ayaka Sakaguchi	Artistic gymnastics	Women's floor	August 5
Silver	Hikaru Kitagawa; Rio Einaga; Saki Harada	Athletics	Women's half marathon team	August 6
Silver	Mao Kadoya; Chika Yonezawa	Rowing	Lightweight women's double sculls	August 6
Silver	Taiyo Yasuhara	Athletics	Men's 5000 m	August 6
Silver	Kodai Nishiono	Swimming	Men's 200 m backstroke	August 6
Silver	Sayaka Yokota; Sae Nakajima; Saki Ishikura; Angelina Kobayashi; Kurumi Takama; Hiroyo Yamanaka; Haruna Kawabata; Tsukasa Nakagawa; Yoshino Sato; Haruka Oyama; Furi Kosa; Ameze Miyabe	Volleyball	Women's tournament	August 6
Silver	Reo Nishida; Karen Yamasaki	Diving	Mixed team	August 7
Bronze	Tohma Ebina	Wushu	Men's taijijian	July 29
Bronze	Moka Furukawa	Wushu	Women's jianshu	July 30
Bronze	Rise Shoji	Wushu	Women's taijijian	July 30
Bronze	Reina Matsusaka	Rhythmic gymnastics	Women's individual all-around	July 30
Bronze	Kyoka Hayashi; Yuka Ishii; Saya Nishiyama; Yuri Shimada; Mio Takii	Rhythmic gymnastics	Women's group all-around	July 30
Bronze	Kazuki Nakanishi	Judo	Men's 90 kg	July 31
Bronze	Reina Matsusaka	Rhythmic gymnastics	Women's individual clubs	July 31
Bronze	Yuta Tanaka; Shodai Miyagawa; Yuma Tanigaki; Jo Yokotani; Kazuki Hamada	Table tennis	Men's team	August 1
Bronze	Ikki Imoto	Swimming	Men's 400 m freestyle	August 1
Bronze	Momoka Yoshii; Hazuki Yamamoto; Riru Kubota; Shiho Matsumoto	Swimming	Women's 4 × 100 m freestyle relay	August 1
Bronze	Yuito Yamamoto	Athletics	Men's 10,000 m	August 2
Bronze	Tamaki Terayama	Fencing	Women's individual épée	August 2
Bronze	Tamon Yoshida	Fencing	Men's individual sabre	August 2
Bronze	Hana Kondo; Shuta Yamada	Diving	Mixed synchronized 3 m springboard	August 3
Bronze	Shuta Yamada; Reo Nishida	Diving	Men's synchronized 10 m platform	August 3
Bronze	Shodai Miyagawa; Kyoka Idesawa	Table tennis	Mixed doubles	August 3
Bronze	Atsushi Shobu	Athletics	Men's 3000 m steeplechase	August 3
Bronze	Kazuma Kaya	Artistic gymnastics	Men's individual all-around	August 4
Bronze	Aoi Kurono; Akari Motoi	Table tennis	Women's doubles	August 4
Bronze	Ayaka Sakaguchi	Artistic gymnastics	Women's individual all-around	August 4
Bronze	Yamato Fukasawa	Swimming	Men's 200 m breaststroke	August 4
Bronze	Momoka Yoshii; Shiho Matsumoto; Kanon Nagao; Ichika Kajimoto	Swimming	Women's 4 × 200 m freestyle relay	August 4
Bronze	Haruki Manju	Athletics	Men's 20 km walk	August 5
Bronze	Misaki Matsuda; Ikumi Yamazaki	Tennis	Women's doubles	August 5
Bronze	Shinji Hazawa; Ryotaro Taguchi	Tennis	Men's doubles	August 5
Bronze	Ayaka Sakaguchi	Artistic gymnastics	Women's balance beam	August 5
Bronze	Kazuma Kaya	Artistic gymnastics	Men's parallel bars	August 5
Bronze	Risa Yamazaki	Athletics	Women's 5000 m	August 5
Bronze	Shoko Miyata	Artistic gymnastics	Women's floor	August 5
Bronze	Kaito Sugimoto	Artistic gymnastics	Men's horizontal bar	August 5
Bronze	Reishi Yoshida; Kotaro Shinohara; Rei Matsunaga	Athletics	Men's half marathon team	August 6
Bronze	Tomoya Fujiwara; Lisa-Marie Rioux	Tennis	Mixed doubles	August 6
Bronze	Anri Nagata; Lisa-Marie Rioux; Ikumi Yamazaki; Misaki Matsuda	Tennis	Women's team	August 6
Bronze	Tomoya Fujiwara; Hikaru Shiraishi; Shinji Hazawa; Shotaro Taguchi	Tennis	Men's team	August 6
Bronze	Reina Iwamoto; Arisa Kano; Haruka Umetsu	Fencing	Women's team foil	August 6
Bronze	Kai Kaneto; Reo Nishida; Shuta Yamada	Diving	Men's team	August 7
Bronze	Yuto Takiguchi; Rio Uemura	Badminton	Mixed doubles	August 7
Bronze	Moe Aoki; Machi Nagasako	Badminton	Women's doubles	August 7
Bronze	Toma Noda	Badminton	Men's singles	August 7
Bronze	Chiho Mizuguchi	Swimming	Women's 200 m butterfly	August 7
Bronze	Ei Kamikawabata	Swimming	Men's 400 m individual medley	August 7
Bronze	Natsuki Hiroshita; Haruna Ogata; Yumi Shuno; Shiho Matsumoto; Hazuki Yamamoto	Swimming	Women's 4 x 100 m medley relay	August 7
Bronze	Juran Mizohata; Riku Matsuyama; Genki Terakado; Yamato Fukasawa; Konosuke Yanagimoto; Yu Hanaguruma; Takumi Terada; Reo Miura	Swimming	Men's 4 x 100 m medley relay	August 7
