= Athletics at the 2021 Summer World University Games – Women's 20 kilometres walk =

The women's 20 kilometres race walk event at the 2021 Summer World University Games was held on 5 August 2023 at the Shuangliu Sports Centre Stadium in Chengdu, China.

== Medalists ==
Gold	Silver	Bronze
Meryem Bekmez; Turkey	Eliška Martínková; Czech Republic	Gao Lan; China
China; Gao Lan; Yin Lamei; Liu Roumei; Ji Jie	Slovakia; Hana Burzalová; Alžbeta Ragasová; Ema Hačundová	India; Priyanka Goswami; Kumawat Pooja; Mansi Negi; Nikita Lamba

== Results ==
=== Individual ===
Rank	Name	Nationality	Time	Notes
1st place, gold medalist(s)	Meryem Bekmez	Turkey	1:33:53	
2nd place, silver medalist(s)	Eliška Martínková	Czech Republic	1:33:58	
3rd place, bronze medalist(s)	Gao Lan	China	1:35:28	
4	Yin Lamei	China	1:35:52	
5	Alexandrina Mihai	Italy	1:38:08	
6	Ayane Yanai	Japan	1:38:51	
7	Priyanka Goswami	India	1:40:39	
8	Liu Roumei	China	1:40:42	
9	Ji Jie	China	1:41:35	
10	Hana Burzalová	Slovakia	1:41:38	
11	Alžbeta Ragasová	Slovakia	1:41:55	
12	Ema Hačundová	Slovakia	1:42:04	
13	Tiziana Spiller	Hungary	1:44:00	
14	Kristina Morozova	Kazakhstan	1:45:05	
15	Kumawat Pooja	India	1:45:30	
16	Mansi Negi	India	1:46:04	
17	Inês Mendes	Portugal	1:46:27	
18	Elizabeth McMillen	Australia	1:48:38	
19	Samantha Findlay	Australia	1:49:37	
20	Monika Vaiciukevičiūtė	Lithuania	1:49:51	
21	Nikita Lamba	India	1:50:11	
22	Juliana Talaro	Philippines	2:06:54	
23	Alana Halaguena	Philippines	2:13:44	

=== Team ===
Rank	Nation	Athletes	Time	Notes
1st place, gold medalist(s)	China	Gao Lan; Yin Lamei; Liu Roumei; Ji Jie	4:52:02	
2nd place, silver medalist(s)	Slovakia	Hana Burzalová; Alžbeta Ragasová; Ema Hačundová	5:05:36	
3rd place, bronze medalist(s)	India	Priyanka Goswami; Kumawat Pooja; Mansi Negi; Nikita Lamba	5:12:13	
