= Tennis at the 2021 Summer World University Games – Men's team =

Men's team at the 2021 Summer World University Games
- Venue: Sichuan International Tennis Centre
- Location: Chengdu, China
- Dates: 29 July 2023 – 6 August 2023

Medalists
gold medal	Chinese Taipei (TPE)
silver medal	Switzerland (SUI)
bronze medal	Japan (JPN)

Men's team
- Tennis at the 2021 Summer World University Games

Events
Singles	men	women
Doubles	men	women	mixed
Team	men	women
← 2019 ·	Summer World University Games	· 2023 →

The men's team classification tennis event at the 2021 Summer World University Games was held between 29 July and 6 August 2021 at the Sichuan International Tennis Centre in Chengdu, China.

== Ranking system ==
The following chart shows the points earned on each ranking in each event.

Rank	Points	
Rank	Singles	Doubles
1st place, gold medalist(s)	60	
2nd place, silver medalist(s)	40	
3rd place, bronze medalist(s)	20	
5/8	10	
9/16	5	—

If the results are same, the rank will be judged in the following steps:

- Medal counts
- Gold medal counts
- Best rank at the singles event.

== Results ==
=== Individual ranking ===
Placing	MS		MD		XD	
Placing	Athlete	Points	Athlete	Points	Athlete	Points
1st place, gold medalist(s)	Henry von der Schulenburg (SUI)	60	Hsu Yu-hsiou (TPE); Huang Tsung-hao (TPE)	60	Hsu Yu-hsiou (TPE); Wu Fang-hsien (TPE)	60
2nd place, silver medalist(s)	Kasidit Samrej (THA)	40	Jan Jermar (CZE); Victor Sklenka (CZE)	40	Jin Yuquan (CHN); Tang Qianhui (CHN)	40
3rd place, bronze medalist(s)	Sergey Fomin (UZB)	20	Shinji Hazawa (JPN); Ryotaro Taguchi (JPN)	20	Tomoya Fujiwara (JPN); Lisa Marie Rioux (JPN)	20
3rd place, bronze medalist(s)	Jang Yun-seok (KOR)	20	Jonas Schär (SUI); Jeffery von der Schulenburg (SUI)	20	Wong Chak Lam (HKG); Wong Hong Yi (HKG)	20
5/8	Liam Krall (USA)	10	Francisco de Amorim Rocha (POR); Torres Reis (POR)	10	Warren Clark (USA); Elise Wagle (USA)	10
5/8	Francisco de Amorim Rocha (POR)	10	Louis Dussin (FRA); Adrien Gobat (FRA)	10	Congsup Congcar (THA); Yatawee Chimcham (THA)	10
5/8	Hikaru Shiraishi (JPN)	10	Ann Suk (KOR); Jang Yun-seok (KOR)	10	Adrien Gobat (FRA); Alice Robbe (FRA)	10
5/8	Huang Tsung-hao (TPE)	10	Sergey Fomin (UZB); Maksim Shin (UZB)	10	Joshua Charlton (AUS); Amy Stevens (AUS)	10
9/16	Yuttana Charoenphon (THA)	5	—			
9/16	Ryotaro Taguchi (JPN)	5	—			
9/16	Lleyton Cronje (RSA)	5	—			
9/16	Ray Ho (TPE)	5	—			
9/16	Jeffery von der Schulenburg (SUI)	5	—			
9/16	Louis Dussin (FRA)	5	—			
9/16	Liu Hanyi (CHN)	5	—			
9/16	Jan Jermar (CZE)	5	—			

=== Rankings by nation ===
Rank	Nation	Men's singles				Men's doubles		Mixed doubles		Total	Medal		
Rank	Nation	Athlete	Points	Athlete	Points	Athlete	Points	Athlete	Points	Total	1st place, gold medalist(s)	2nd place, silver medalist(s)	3rd place, bronze medalist(s)
1st place, gold medalist(s)	Chinese Taipei (TPE)	Huang Tsung-hao	10	Ray Ho	5	Hsu Yu-hsiou; Huang Tsung-hao	60	Hsu Yu-hsiou; Wu Fang-hsien	60	135	2		
2nd place, silver medalist(s)	Switzerland (SUI)	Jeffery von der Schulenburg	5	Henry von der Schulenburg	60	Jonas Schär; Jeffery von der Schulenburg	20			85	1		1
3rd place, bronze medalist(s)	Japan (JPN)	Hikaru Shiraishi	10	Ryotaro Taguchi	5	Shinji Hazawa; Ryotaro Taguchi	20	Tomoya Fujiwara; Lisa Marie Rioux	20	55			2
4	Thailand (THA)	Kasidit Samrej	40	Yuttana Charoenphon	5			Congsup Congcar; Yatawee Chimcham	10	55		1	
5	Czech Republic (CZE)	Jan Jermar	5			Jan Jermar; Victor Sklenka	40			45		1	
5	China (CHN)	Liu Hanyi	5					Jin Yuquan; Tang Qianhui	40	45		1	
7	South Korea (KOR)	Jang Yun-seok	20			Ann Suk; Jang Yun-seok	10			30			1
7	Uzbekistan (UZB)	Sergey Fomin	20			Sergey Fomin; Maksim Shin	10			30			1
9	France (FRA)	Louis Dussin	5			Louis Dussin; Adrien Gobat	10	Adrien Gobat; Alice Robbe	10	25			
10	Hong Kong (HKG)							Wong Chak Lam; Wong Hong Yi	20	20			1
11	Portugal (POR)	Francisco de Amorim Rocha	10			Francisco de Amorim Rocha; Torres Reis	10			20			
11	United States (USA)	Liam Krall	10					Warren Clark; Elise Wagle	10	20			
13	Australia (AUS)							Joshua Charlton; Amy Stevens	10	10			
14	South Africa (RSA)	Lleyton Cronje	5							5			
