= Tennis at the 2021 Summer World University Games – Men's doubles =

Men's doubles at the 2021 Summer World University Games
- Venue: Sichuan International Tennis Centre
- Location: Chengdu, China
- Dates: 30 July 2023 – 5 August 2023
- Competitors: 40 from 20 nations

Medalists
gold medal	Hsu Yu-hsiou; Huang Tsung-hao	Chinese Taipei
silver medal	Jan Jermar; Victor Sklenka	Czech Republic
bronze medal	Shinji Hazawa; Ryotaro Taguchi	Japan
bronze medal	Jonas Schär; Jeffery von der Schulenburg	Switzerland

Men's doubles
- Tennis at the 2021 Summer World University Games

Events
Singles	men	women
Doubles	men	women	mixed
Team	men	women
← 2019 ·	Summer World University Games	· 2023 →

The men's doubles tennis event at the 2021 Summer World University Games was held from 30 July to 5 August at the Sichuan International Tennis Centre in Chengdu, China.

Chinese Taipei's Hsu Yu-hsiou / Huang Tsung-hao won the gold medal, defeating Czech Republic's Jan Jermar / Victor Sklenka in the final, 6–3, 6–3.

Japan's Shinji Hazawa / Ryotaro Taguchi and Switzerland's Jonas Schär / Jeffery von der Schulenburg won the bronze medals.

== Seeds ==
All seeds receive a bye into the second round.

1. Hsu Yu-hsiou / Huang Tsung-hao (TPE) (champion; gold medalist)
2. Sergey Fomin / Maksim Shin (UZB) (quarter-finals)
3. Shinji Hazawa / Ryotaro Taguchi (JPN) (semi-finals; bronze medalist)
4. Kasidit Samrej / Thantub Suksumran (THA) (second round)
5. Louis Dussin / Adrien Gobat (FRA) (quarter-finals)
6. Jan Jermar / Victor Sklenka (CZE) (final; silver medalist)
7. Francisco de Amorim Rocha / Torres Reis (POR) (quarter-finals)
8. Jonas Schär / Jeffrey von der Schulenburg (SUI) (semi-finals; bronze medalist)

== Draw ==
Key

- Q = Qualifier
- WC = Wild card
- LL = Lucky loser
- Alt = Alternate
- ITF = ITF entry
- PR = Protected ranking
- SR = Special ranking
- SE = Special exempt
- JE = Junior exempt
- JR = Junior Accelerator Programme entrant
- CO = College Accelerator Programme entrant
- NG = Next Gen Accelerator Program entrant
- w/o = Walkover
- r = Retired
- d = Defaulted

=== Finals ===
Semi-finals
1	Hsu Yu-hsiou (TPE); Huang Tsung-hao (TPE)	6	6
3	Shinji Hazawa (JPN); Ryotaro Taguchi (JPN)	3	2
8	Jonas Schär (SUI); Jeffery von der Schulenburg (SUI)	6	3	4
6	Jan Jermar (CZE); Victor Sklenka (CZE)	4	6	10

Final
1	Hsu Yu-hsiou (TPE); Huang Tsung-hao (TPE)	6	6
6	Jan Jermar (CZE); Victor Sklenka (CZE)	3	3

=== Top half ===
==== Section 1 ====
First round
L Cronje (RSA); J Fogle (RSA)	7	6
T Azizov (AZE); H Garayev (AZE)	5	0

Second round
1	Hsu Y-h (TPE); Huang T-h (TPE)	6	6
L Cronje (RSA); J Fogle (RSA)	2	3
Lee M H (HKG); Leung Y H (HKG)	6^{5}	7	10
7	F de Amorim Rocha (POR); T Reis (POR)	7^{7}	5	12

Quarter-finals
1	Hsu Y-h (TPE); Huang T-h (TPE)	6	7
7	F de Amorim Rocha (POR); T Reis (POR)	4	5

==== Section 2 ====
First round
M Moncada (COL); Z Montoya (COL)	3	1
Gu J (CHN); Zhao Z (CHN)	6	6

Second round
3	S Hazawa (JPN); R Taguchi (JPN)	6^{4}	6	10
Gu J (CHN); Zhao Z (CHN)	7^{7}	2	4
W Clark (USA); L Krall (USA)	4	6	5
5	L Dussin (FRA); A Gobat (FRA)	6	3	10

Quarter-finals
3	S Hazawa (JPN); R Taguchi (JPN)	6	6
5	L Dussin (FRA); A Gobat (FRA)	4	2

=== Bottom half ===
==== Section 3 ====
First round
Ann S (KOR); Jang Y-s (KOR)	6	6
E Birungi (UGA); J Mwisuke (UGA)	0	1

Second round
8	J Schär (SUI); J von der Schulenburg (SUI)	6	6
A Marinho (BRA); X Pereira (BRA)	0	0
Ann S (KOR); Jang Y-s (KOR)	6	6
4	K Samrej (THA); T Suksumran (THA)	3	4

Quarter-finals
8	J Schär (SUI); J von der Schulenburg (SUI)	6	6
Ann S (KOR); Jang Y-s (KOR)	4	4

==== Section 4 ====
First round
V Aguiard (AUS); J Charlton (AUS)	7^{7}	6
P Jaya (IND); S Karunanjayan (IND)	6^{4}	3

Second round
6	J Jermar (CZE); V Sklenka (CZE)	7^{8}	2	10
A Desvianto (INA); L Kurniawan (INA)	6^{6}	6	7
V Aguiard (AUS); J Charlton (AUS)	6^{3}	6	8
2	S Fomin (UZB); M Shin (UZB)	7^{7}	1	10

Quarter-finals
6	J Jermar (CZE); V Sklenka (CZE)	0	7^{7}	10
2	S Fomin (UZB); M Shin (UZB)	6	6^{5}	8
