= Guatemala at the 2021 Summer World University Games =

- Flag of Guatemala
- IOC code: GUA

in Chengdu, China 28 July 2023 – 8 August 2023
- Competitors: 2 (1 man and 1 woman)
- Medals: Gold 0 Silver 0 Bronze 0 Total 0

Summer World University Games appearances
- 1959; 1961; 1963; 1965; 1967; 1970; 1973; 1975; 1977; 1979; 1981; 1983; 1985; 1987; 1989; 1991; 1993; 1995; 1997; 1999; 2001; 2003; 2005; 2007; 2009; 2011; 2013; 2015; 2017; 2019; 2021; 2025; 2027

Guatemala competed at the 2021 Summer World University Games in Chengdu, China held from 28 July to 8 August 2023.

== Competitors ==
Sport	Men	Women	Total
Swimming	1	1	2

== Swimming ==
Men

Athlete	Event	Heat		Semi-finals		Final	
Athlete	Event	Time	Rank	Time	Rank	Time	Rank
Jacob Itzep	50 metre freestyle	25.22	51	Did not advance			
Jacob Itzep	100 metre freestyle	55.61	49	Did not advance			
Jacob Itzep	200 metre freestyle	2:04.60	39	Did not advance			
Jacob Itzep	50 metre butterfly	27.97	43	Did not advance			
Jacob Itzep	100 metre butterfly	1:01.94	40	Did not advance			
Jacob Itzep	200 metre butterfly	2:23.61	24	Did not advance			

Women

Athlete	Event	Heat		Semi-finals		Final	
Athlete	Event	Time	Rank	Time	Rank	Time	Rank
Asly Pelico	100 metre freestyle	1:07.02	43	Did not advance			
Asly Pelico	50 metre butterfly	33.45	42	Did not advance			
Asly Pelico	100 metre butterfly	1:12.87	35	Did not advance			
Asly Pelico	200 metre butterfly	2:47.28	22	Did not advance			
