= Athletics at the 2021 Summer World University Games – Women's half marathon =

The women's half marathon event at the 2021 Summer World University Games was held on 6 August 2023 at the Shuangliu Sports Centre Stadium in Chengdu, China.

== Medalists ==
Gold	Silver	Bronze
Hikaru Kitagawa; Japan	Yayla Gönen; Turkey	Fatma Karasu; Turkey
Turkey; Yayla Gönen; Fatma Karasu; Derya Kunur; Burcu Subatan	Japan; Hikaru Kitagawa; Rio Einaga; Saki Harada	China; Luo Xia; Niu Lihua; Xia Yuyu; Wang Jiali

== Results ==
=== Individual ===
Rank	Name	Nationality	Time	Notes
1st place, gold medalist(s)	Hikaru Kitagawa	Japan	1:13:17	
2nd place, silver medalist(s)	Yayla Gönen	Turkey	1:13:31	
3rd place, bronze medalist(s)	Fatma Karasu	Turkey	1:14:28	
4	Tereza Hrochová	Czech Republic	1:14:48	
5	Derya Kunur	Turkey	1:15:15	
6	Luo Xia	China	1:15:30	
7	Mélody Julien	France	1:15:33	
8	Rio Einaga	Japan	1:15:34	
9	Michelle Schaub	Switzerland	1:15:36	
10	Niu Lihua	China	1:15:59	
11	Mathilde Sénéchal	France	1:16:16	
12	Esther Jacobitz	Germany	1:16:28	
13	Anja Fink	Slovenia	1:16:34	
14	Saki Harada	Japan	1:16:36	
15	Maria Mailula	South Africa	1:16:37	PB
16	Jasmina Stahl	Germany	1:17:11	
17	Xia Yuyu	China	1:17:15	
18	Burcu Subatan	Turkey	1:18:03	
19	Kevate Reshma	India	1:18:50	
20	Wang Jiali	China	1:19:57	
21	Sophie Kretschmer	Germany	1:20:37	
22	Nirmaben Thakor	India	1:20:52	
23	Lo Ying Chiu	Hong Kong	1:21:01	
24	Barbora Macurová	Czech Republic	1:22:03	
25	Azizakhon Mirzakbarova	Uzbekistan	1:22:54	
26	Rani Muchandi	India	1:23:20	
27	Poonam Sonune	India	1:24:23	
28	Lesego Mpshe	South Africa	1:26:14	PB
29	Wong Cheuk Ning	Hong Kong	1:28:04	
30	Tsholofelo Masigo	South Africa	1:30:14	

=== Team ===
Rank	Nation	Athletes	Time	Notes
1st place, gold medalist(s)	Turkey	Yayla Gönen; Fatma Karasu; Derya Kunur; Burcu Subatan	3:43:14	
2nd place, silver medalist(s)	Japan	Hikaru Kitagawa; Rio Einaga; Saki Harada	3:45:27	
3rd place, bronze medalist(s)	China	Luo Xia; Niu Lihua; Xia Yuyu; Wang Jiali	3:48:44	
4	Germany	Esther Jacobitz; Jasmina Stahl; Sophie Kretschmer	3:54:16	
5	India	Kevate Reshma; Nirmaben Thakor; Rani Muchandi; Poonam Sonune	4:03:02	
6	South Africa	Maria Mailula; Lesego Mpshe; Tsholofelo Masigo	4:13:05	
