= Swimming at the 2018 Summer Youth Olympics – Boys' 200 metre breaststroke =

Boys' 200 metre breaststroke at the 2018 Summer Youth Olympics
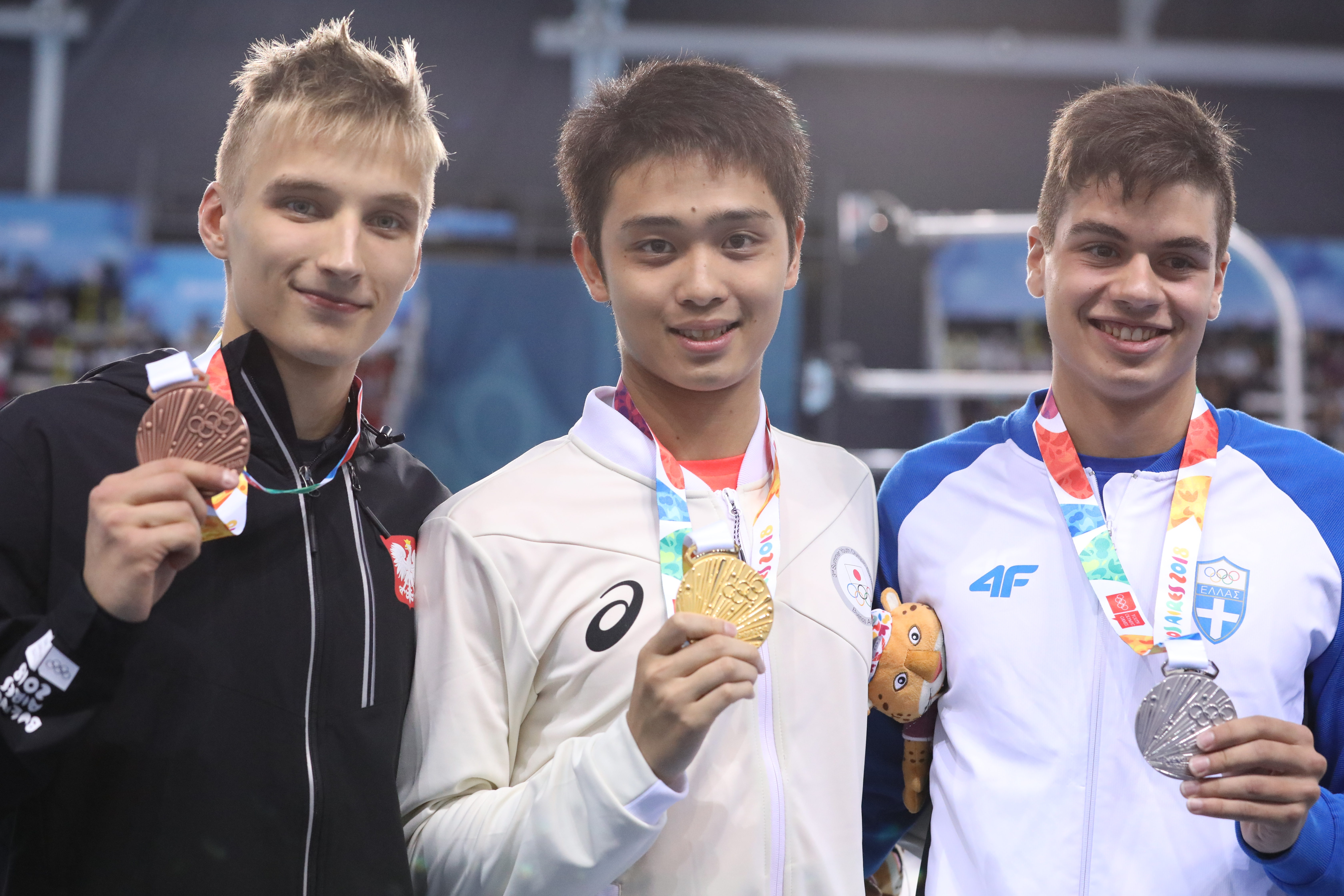
- The podium.
- Venue: Natatorium
- Dates: 10 October
- Competitors: 26 from 25 nations
- Winning time: 2:11.63

Medalists
gold medal	Yu Hanaguruma	Japan
silver medal	Savvas Thomoglou	Greece
bronze medal	Jan Kałusowski	Poland

The boys' 200 metre breaststroke event at the 2018 Summer Youth Olympics took place on 10 October at the Natatorium in Buenos Aires, Argentina.

== Results ==
=== Heats ===
The heats were started at 10:25.

Rank	Heat	Lane	Name	Nationality	Time	Notes
1	4	4	Yu Hanaguruma	Japan	2:13.58	Q
2	4	3	Savvas Thomoglou	Greece	2:14.94	Q
3	4	6	Phạm Thanh Bảo	Vietnam	2:15.29	Q
4	3	5	Caspar Corbeau	Netherlands	2:15.38	Q
5	4	5	Jan Kałusowski	Poland	2:15.51	Q
6	4	7	Maximillian Ang	Singapore	2:16.09	Q
7	2	3	Matija Može	Slovenia	2:16.28	Q
8	2	5	Taku Taniguchi	Japan	2:16.67	Q
9	2	4	Denis Petrashov	Kyrgyzstan	2:16.70	
10	3	4	Sun Jiajun	China	2:16.77	
11	3	3	Ethan Dang	United States	2:18.69	
12	1	3	Vitor de Souza	Brazil	2:18.83	
13	3	6	Marcus Mok	Hong Kong	2:19.18	
14	3	2	André Klippenberg Grindheim	Norway	2:19.61	
15	2	1	Jānis Vitauts Siliņš	Latvia	2:19.64	
16	2	6	Amro Al-Wir	Jordan	2:20.65	
17	3	7	Demirkan Demir	Turkey	2:21.01	
18	4	1	Finlay Knox	Canada	2:21.46	
19	2	7	Jarod Arroyo	Puerto Rico	2:21.49	
20	1	4	Liam Davis	Zimbabwe	2:21.59	
21	4	2	Sebestyén Böhm	Hungary	2:21.75	
22	2	2	Andrés Puente	Mexico	2:21.76	
23	3	1	Izaak Bastian	Bahamas	2:22.37	
24	3	8	Moncef Aymen Balamane	Algeria	2:22.61	
25	1	5	David Solis	Costa Rica	2:24.37	
26	4	8	Michael Houlie	South Africa	2:26.21	

=== Final ===
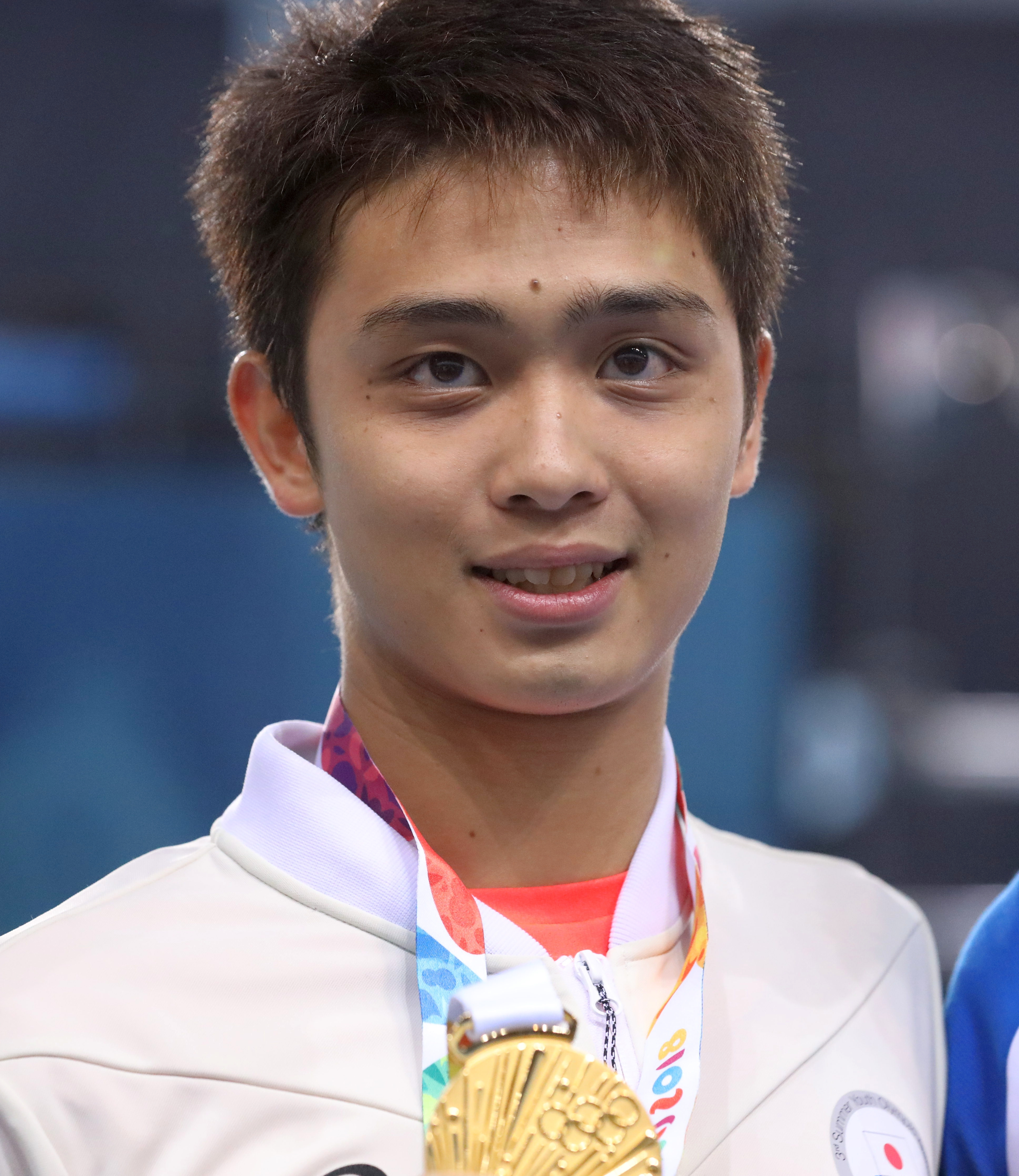
Yu Hanaguruma, Youth Olympic Champion

The final was held at 18:15.

Rank	Lane	Name	Nationality	Time	Notes
1st place, gold medalist(s)	4	Yu Hanaguruma	Japan	2:11.63	
2nd place, silver medalist(s)	5	Savvas Thomoglou	Greece	2:13.62	
3rd place, bronze medalist(s)	2	Jan Kałusowski	Poland	2:13.72	
4	6	Caspar Corbeau	Netherlands	2:14.28	
5	8	Taku Taniguchi	Japan	2:15.21	
6	1	Matija Može	Slovenia	2:16.58	
7	7	Maximillian Ang	Singapore	2:18.85	
	3	Phạm Thanh Bảo	Vietnam	DSQ	
