= Athletics at the 2021 Summer World University Games – Men's 20 kilometres walk =

The men's 20 kilometres race walk event at the 2021 Summer World University Games was held on 5 August 2023 at the Shuangliu Sports Centre Stadium in Chengdu, China.

== Medalists ==
Gold	Silver	Bronze
Salih Korkmaz; Turkey	Qian Haifeng; China	Haruki Manju; Japan
China; Qian Haifeng; Cui Lihong; Li Yandong; Zhang Hongliang; Li Xiaobin	Japan; Haruki Manju; Kazuhiro Tateiwa; Kento Yoshikawa	Australia; William Thompson; Mitchell Baker; Dylan Richardson; Tim Fraser

== Results ==
=== Individual ===
Rank	Name	Nationality	Time	Notes
1st place, gold medalist(s)	Salih Korkmaz	Turkey	1:23:40	
2nd place, silver medalist(s)	Qian Haifeng	China	1:24:40	
3rd place, bronze medalist(s)	Haruki Manju	Japan	1:25:32	
4	Cui Lihong	China	1:26:16	
5	Kazuhiro Tateiwa	Japan	1:26:40	
6	Li Yandong	China	1:27:58	
7	Dominik Černý	Slovakia	1:28:38	
8	Kento Yoshikawa	Japan	1:29:06	
9	William Thompson	Australia	1:29:24	
10	Zhang Hongliang	China	1:29:39	
11	Leo Köpp	Germany	1:30:08	
12	Mitchell Baker	Australia	1:30:10	
13	Johannes Frenzl	Germany	1:30:37	
14	Kim Ming-yu	South Korea	1:31:16	
15	Joo Hyun-myeong	South Korea	1:31:35	
16	Gabriele Gamba	Italy	1:32:19	
17	Dylan Richardson	Australia	1:33:19	
18	Sahil Dodda	India	1:33:53	
19	Li Xiaobin	China	1:33:59	
20	Neeraj Chaurasiya	India	1:35:40	
21	Paulo Ribeiro	Brazil	1:35:51	
22	Jason Cherng	United States	1:41:20	
23	Tim Fraser	Australia	1:50:36	
–	Matheus Corrêa	Brazil	DNF	
–	Hardeep Singh	India	DQ	

=== Team ===
Rank	Nation	Athletes	Time	Notes
1st place, gold medalist(s)	China	Qian Haifeng; Cui Lihong; Li Yandong; Zhang Hongliang; Li Xiaobin	4:18:54	
2nd place, silver medalist(s)	Japan	Haruki Manju; Kazuhiro Tateiwa; Kento Yoshikawa	4:21:18	
3rd place, bronze medalist(s)	Australia	William Thompson; Mitchell Baker; Dylan Richardson; Tim Fraser	4:32:52	
–	India	Sahil Dodda; Neeraj Chaurasiya; Hardeep Singh	DQ	
