= Mariana Machado =

Portuguese middle-distance runner

Personal information
- Full name: Mariana Machado Carvalho
- Nationality: Portuguese
- Born: 12 November 2000 (age 25) Braga, Portugal
- Education: Medicine at University of Minho

Sport
- Sport: Athletics
- Events: Middle-distance running, Cross country running
- University team: University of Minho
- Club: Braga
- Coached by: Sameiro Araújo
Medal record
Representing Portugal
European Team Championships
Silver medal – second place	2019 Sandnes (FL)	5000 m
Bronze medal – third place	2019 Sandnes (FL)	3000 m
European Cross Country Championships
Bronze medal – third place	2021 Dublin	U23
Bronze medal – third place	2019 Lisbon	U20
European U20 Championships
Silver medal – second place	2019 Borås	3000 m
Summer World University Games
Gold medal – first place	2021 Chengdu	5000 m
Mediterranean Games
Silver medal – second place	2026 Taranto	10000 m

Mariana Machado Carvalho (born 12 November 2000) is a Portuguese middle-distance and cross country runner. She competed in the women's 3000 metres event at the 2021 European Athletics Indoor Championships. She is the daughter of Portuguese Olympic runner Albertina Machado.

== Awards ==
Year	Award	Category	Result
2020	CDP Awards	Young Promise	Won
2021	CDP Awards	Young Promise	Won
