= Honduras at the 2021 Summer World University Games =

- Flag of Honduras
- IOC code: HON

in Chengdu, China 28 July 2023 – 8 August 2023
- Competitors: 2 (1 man and 1 woman)
- Medals: Gold 0 Silver 0 Bronze 0 Total 0

Summer World University Games appearances
- 1959; 1961; 1963; 1965; 1967; 1970; 1973; 1975; 1977; 1979; 1981; 1983; 1985; 1987; 1989; 1991; 1993; 1995; 1997; 1999; 2001; 2003; 2005; 2007; 2009; 2011; 2013; 2015; 2017; 2019; 2021; 2025; 2027

Honduras competed at the 2021 Summer World University Games in Chengdu, China held from 28 July to 8 August 2023.

== Competitors ==
Sport	Men	Women	Total
Swimming	1	1	2

== Swimming ==
Men

Athlete	Event	Heat		Semi-finals		Final	
Athlete	Event	Time	Rank	Time	Rank	Time	Rank
Alfonso Duran	100 metre backstroke	1:05.81	35	Did not advance			
Alfonso Duran	100 metre butterfly	1:01.13	37	Did not advance			

Women

Athlete	Event	Heat		Semi-finals		Final	
Athlete	Event	Time	Rank	Time	Rank	Time	Rank
Giselle Pérez	50 metre butterfly	32.47	40	Did not advance			
Giselle Pérez	100 metre butterfly	1:12.65	34	Did not advance			
Giselle Pérez	200 metre butterfly	Did not start					
