= Athletics at the 2021 Summer World University Games – Women's 5000 metres =

The women's 5000 metres event at the 2021 Summer World University Games was held on 3 and 5 August 2023 at the Shuangliu Sports Centre Stadium in Chengdu, China.

== Medalists ==
Gold	Silver	Bronze
Mariana Machado; Portugal	Xia Yuyu; China	Risa Yamazaki; Japan

== Results ==
=== Round 1 ===
Qualification: First 8 in each heat (Q) advance to final.

Rank	Heat	Name	Nationality	Time	Notes
1	1	Ma Xiuzhen	China	16:30.08	Q
2	1	Nicola Jansen	South Africa	16:39.48	Q
3	2	Holly Campbell	Australia	16:42.45	Q
4	2	Xia Yuyu	China	16:54.09	Q
5	2	Violette Ndayikengurukiye	Burundi	16:54.49	Q, PB
6	1	Ainuska Kalil kyzy	Kyrgyzstan	16:55.89	Q
7	1	Risa Yamazaki	Japan	16:58.97	Q
8	2	Tomo Muramatsu	Japan	17:10.66	Q
9	2	Mariana Machado	Portugal	17:11.20	Q
10	2	Amalie Sæten	Norway	17:11.33	Q
11	2	Line Schulz	Denmark	17:11.67	Q
12	2	Derya Kunur	Turkey	17:16.55	Q
13	2	Rinkee Pawara	India	17:21.43	
14	1	Burcu Subatan	Turkey	17:23.22	Q
15	1	Leila Hadji	France	17:29.84	Q
16	2	Novia Nur Nirwani	Indonesia	17:56.73	
17	1	Estefanía Aristizábal	Colombia	18:16.22	Q
18	1	Rajabmo Abdulloeva	Tajikistan	20:21.77	Q
–	1	Poonam Sonune	India	DNF	
–	1	Maria Kassou	Greece	DNS	
–	1	Abir Reffas	Algeria	DNS	

=== Final ===
Rank	Name	Nationality	Time	Notes
1st place, gold medalist(s)	Mariana Machado	Portugal	16:02.58	
2nd place, silver medalist(s)	Xia Yuyu	China	16:04.00	
3rd place, bronze medalist(s)	Risa Yamazaki	Japan	16:08.86	
4	Amalie Sæten	Norway	16:08.90	
5	Ma Xiuzhen	China	16:13.98	
6	Burcu Subatan	Turkey	16:19.92	
7	Leila Hadji	France	16:22.48	
8	Derya Kunur	Turkey	16:32.99	PB
9	Holly Campbell	Australia	16:34.39	
10	Nicola Jansen	South Africa	16:38.72	
11	Tomo Muramatsu	Japan	16:51.22	
12	Ainuska Kalil kyzy	Kyrgyzstan	16:57.16	
13	Violette Ndayikengurukiye	Burundi	17:11.92	
14	Line Schulz	Denmark	17:37.24	
15	Estefanía Aristizábal	Colombia	18:08.03	
16	Rajabmo Abdulloeva	Tajikistan	19:50.51	
