= Rowing at the 2021 Summer World University Games =

Rowing competition

- Venue: Sichuan Water Sports School
- Date: 4–6 August

Rowing was contested at the 2021 Summer World University Games at the Sichuan Water Sports School in Chengdu, Sichuan, China from 4 to 6 August 2023.

== Summary ==
Source:

== Medal table ==
* Host nation (China)

| Rank | Nation | Gold | Silver | Bronze | Total |
|---|---|---|---|---|---|
| 1 | China* | 4 | 2 | 4 | 10 |
| 2 | Poland | 3 | 2 | 0 | 5 |
| 3 | Italy | 2 | 3 | 2 | 7 |
| 4 | Netherlands | 2 | 2 | 1 | 5 |
| 5 | Lithuania | 2 | 1 | 0 | 3 |
| 6 | Turkey | 1 | 0 | 1 | 2 |
| 7 | Czech Republic | 1 | 0 | 0 | 1 |
| 8 | Germany | 0 | 2 | 3 | 5 |
| 9 | South Africa | 0 | 1 | 1 | 2 |
| 10 | Iran | 0 | 1 | 0 | 1 |
| 10 | Japan | 0 | 1 | 0 | 1 |
| 12 | Azerbaijan | 0 | 0 | 1 | 1 |
| 12 | Hungary | 0 | 0 | 1 | 1 |
| 12 | Moldova | 0 | 0 | 1 | 1 |
| Totals (14 entries) | | 15 | 15 | 15 | 45 |

== Medal summary ==
=== Men's events ===
| Event | Gold | | Silver | | Bronze | |
Openweight events
| M1x | Povilas Stankūnas; Lithuania | 6:57.40 | Chen Weichun; China | 6:58.53 | Bahman Nasiri; Azerbaijan | 6:58.97 |
| M2x | Poland (POL); Bartosz Bartkowski; Krzysztof Kasparek | 6:26.11 | Lithuania (LTU); Mantas Juskevicius; Domantas Maročka | 6:27.27 | China (CHN); Ni Xulin; Chen Weichun | 6:28.11 |
| M2− | Netherlands (NED); Pieter van Veen; Eli Brouwer | 6:30.93 | China (CHN); Ni Xulin; Zhang Songhu | 6:31.74 | Moldova (MDA); Alexandr Bulat; Alexandru Maşnic | 6:34.81 |
| M4− | China (CHN); Song Chunxiao; Zong Zhaoshan; Liu Jiangyu; Xiao Yang | 6:09.46 | Italy (ITA); Alessandro Timpanaro; Aleksander Gergolet; Gustavo Ferrio; Riccardo Mattana | 6:12.46 | Turkey (TUR); Ahmet Ali Kabadayi; Kaan Yılmaz Aydın; Aydın İnanç Şahin; Ulaş Kurt | 6:18.14 |
| M8+ | Netherlands (NED); Robert Tiemeijer; Vosse Meijssen; Wessel Hesselink; Kevin-Lee Bieshaar; Sander Hazelaar; Martijn Bos; Mats van Sabben; Dolf Rutten; Aniek van Veenen | 5:35.60 | Germany (GER); Leon Schandl; Tom Tewes; Lukas Fobinger; David Keefer; Henning Köncke; Henry Hopmann; Friedrich Dunkel; René Schmela; Till Martini | 5:39.55 | China (CHN); Su Yuheng; Chen Xingrong; Bai Han; Zong Zhaoshan; Shan Hongji; Sun Simiao; Ge Jiali; Meng Yincen; Sheng Zixin | 5:42.27 |
Lightweight events
| LM1x | Enes Gök; Turkey | 7:11.96 | Amirhossein Mahmoodpour; Iran | 7:13.01 | Tang Haiqi; China | 7:17.31 |
| LM2x | Italy (ITA); Giovanni Borgonovo; Matteo Tonelli | 6:16.86 | Germany (GER); Richard Mohr; Finn Wolter | 6:18.28 | Hungary (HUN); Bence Szabó; Kálmán Furkó | 6:30.18 |

=== Women's events ===
| Event | Gold | | Silver | | Bronze | |
Openweight events
| W1x | Anna Šantrůčková; Czech Republic | 7:41.04 | Courtney Westley; South Africa | 7:42.05 | Sun Hongjing; China | 7:43.02 |
| W2x | Lithuania (LTU); Ugnė Juzėnaitė; Martyna Kazlauskaitė | 7:13.12 | Poland (POL); Paulina Chrzanowska; Izabela Gałek | 7:16.49 | Italy (ITA); Khadija Alajdi El Idrissi; Gaia Colasante | 7:16.57 |
| W2− | China (CHN); Zhou Yuxiu; Zhang Peixin | 7:31.86 | Netherlands (NED); Sanne Muggen; Wia Ruiter | 7:34.03 | Germany (GER); Alissa Buhrmann; Paula Rossen | 7:35.74 |
| W4− | China (CHN); Zhang Shuxian; Liu Xiaoxin; Wang Zifeng; Xu Xingye | 6:41.05 | Poland (POL); Katarzyna Boruch; Martyna Jankowska; Izabela Pawlak; Anna Potrzuska | 6:50.05 | Netherlands (NED); Anne Leerink; Annelouk van Mierlo; Nienke von Hebel; Floor van Ameijde | 6:52.00 |
| W8+ | China (CHN); Ju Wenjun; Xia Keke; Zhao Xuanyi; Wen Jiayi; Zhang Shuxian; Zhao Xingyue; Wang Zifeng; Wu Yihui; Song Jiayi | 6:25.03 | Netherlands (NED); Anne Leerink; Annelouk van Mierlo; Marije Ijpma; Wia Ruiter; Nienke von Hebel; Lisanne Van Der Lelij; Maartje Damen; Floor van Ameijde; Ashraf Morra | 6:29.00 | Italy (ITA); Arianna Noseda; Maria Elena Zerboni; Sofia Ascalone; Susanna Pedrola; Chiara Benvenuti; Gaia Colasante; Khadija Alajdi El Idrissi; Giorgia Borriello; Giulia Clerici | 6:44.86 |
Lightweight events
| LW1x | Zuzanna Jasińska; Poland | 7:43.31 | Elena Sali; Italy | 7:47.84 | Julia Tertünte; Germany | 7:50.42 |
| LW2x | Italy (ITA); Sara Borghi; Ilaria Corazza | 7:01.87 | Japan (JPN); Mao Kadoya; Chika Yonezawa | 7:03.28 | South Africa (RSA); Nadia Gaspari; Chloe Cresswell | 7:07.57 |

=== Mixed events ===
| Event | Gold | | Silver | | Bronze | |
Openweight events
| Mix4X | Poland (POL); Barbara Streng; Katarzyna Duda; Jakub Wozniak; Kajetan Szewczyk | 6:18.25 | Italy (ITA); Sara Borghi; Ilaria Corazza; Giovanni Borgonovo; Matteo Tonelli | 6:19.91 | Germany (GER); Janka Kirstein; Elrond Kullmann; Felix Heinrich; Helena Brenke | 6:22.28 |
