= Diving at the 2021 Summer World University Games =

- Venue: Jianyang Cultural and Sports Centre
- Date: 31 July–7 August 2023
- Competitors: 80 from 18 nations

Diving was contested at the 2021 Summer World University Games from 31 July to 7 August 2023 at the Jianyang Cultural and Sports Centre diving pool in Jianyang, Chengdu, China.

== Participant nations ==
80 athletes from 18 nations participated at the 2021 Summer World University Games.

- Australia (4)
- Brazil (4)
- China (18)
- Finland (1)
- Georgia (3)
- Germany (3)
- Hong Kong (7)
- Italy (3)
- Japan (5)
- South Korea (12)
- Malaysia (2)
- Norway (1)
- South Africa (4)
- Singapore (3)
- Switzerland (1)
- Slovakia (1)
- Sweden (1)
- United States (7)

== Medal table ==
* Host nation (China)

Rank	Nation	Gold	Silver	Bronze	Total
1	China	15	5	1	21
2	South Korea	0	4	4	8
3	Japan	0	2	3	5
4	Germany	0	2	0	2
5	Brazil	0	1	0	1
5	Malaysia	0	1	0	1
7	United States	0	0	4	4
8	Georgia	0	0	1	1
8	Italy	0	0	1	1
Totals (9 entries)		15	15	14	44

== Medal summary ==
=== Men's events ===
Event	Gold	Silver	Bronze
1 metre springboard	Tai Xiaohu; China	Kim Yeong-nam; South Korea	Shi Zhenyu; China
3 metre springboard	Zhang Wenao; China	Liang Chaohui; China	Joung Dong-min; South Korea
10 metre platform	Huang Zigan; China	Yang Ling; China	Shin Jung-whi; South Korea
Synchronized 3 metre springboard	China; Huang Bowen; Liang Chaohui	Germany; Lou Massenberg; Alexander Lube	Georgia; Tornike Onikashvili; Sandro Melikidze
Synchronized 10 metre platform	China; Huang Zigan; Yang Ling	Germany; Lou Massenberg; Tom Waldsteiner	Japan; Shuta Yamada; Reo Nishida
Team	China; Huang Bowen; Huang Zigan; Liang Chaohui; Shi Zhenyu; Tai Xiaohu; Wang Binhan; Yang Ling; Zhang Wenao	South Korea; Joung Dong-min; Kang Min-hyuk; Kim Seo-kyoung; Kim Yeong-nam; Shin Jung-whi	Japan; Kai Kaneto; Reo Nishida; Shuta Yamada

=== Women's events ===
Event	Gold	Silver	Bronze
1 metre springboard	Chen Jia; China	Wang Yi; China	Sophia Verzyl; United States
3 metre springboard	Yang Ruilin; China	Ouyang Yu; China	Sophia Verzyl; United States
10 metre platform	Wang Weiying; China	Zhang Rui; China	Sophia McAfee; United States
Synchronized 3 metre springboard	China; Chen Jia; Yang Ruilin	Malaysia; Kimberly Bong; Ong Ker Ying	Italy; Elettra Neroni; Matilde Borello
Synchronized 10 metre platform	China; Zhang Jiaqi; Zhang Minjie	South Korea; Ko Hyeon-ju; Kim Seo-yeon	Bronze not awarded as only two teams entered in the event
Team	China; Chen Jia; Ouyang Yu; Wang Weiying; Yang Ruilin; Zhang Jiaqi; Zhang Minjie; Zhang Rui	South Korea; Jung Da-yeon; Kim Na-hyun; Kim Seo-yeon; Ko Hyeon-ju; Kwon Ha-lim	United States; Gabrielle Filzen; Jaclynn Fowler; Sophia McAfee; Sophia Verzyl

=== Mixed ===
Event	Gold	Silver	Bronze
Synchronized 3 metre springboard	China; Wang Weiying; Yang Ling	Brazil; Anna Lúcia Santos; Rafael Silva	Japan; Hana Kondo; Shuta Yamada
Synchronized 10 metre platform	China; Wang Weiying; Wang Binhan	Japan; Karen Yamasaki; Reo Nishida	South Korea; Kim Na-hyun; Shin Jung-whi
Mixed team	China; Huang Zigan; Wang Weiying	Japan; Reo Nishida; Karen Yamasaki	South Korea; Shin Jung-whi; Kim Na-hyun
