= Swimming at the 2021 Summer World University Games =

Swimming at the Chengdu 2021 FISU World University Games
- Venue: Dong'an Lake Sports Park Aquatics Centre
- Dates: 1–7 August 2023
- Competitors: 465 from 55 nations

Swimming was contested at the 2021 Summer Universiade from 1 to 7 August 2023 at the Dong'an Lake Sports Park Aquatics Centre, in Chengdu.

== Medal summary ==
=== Medal table ===
* Host nation (China)

Rank	Nation	Gold	Silver	Bronze	Total
1	China	18	0	2	20
2	Italy	8	10	13	31
3	Poland	6	7	2	15
4	Japan	4	5	8	17
5	Lithuania	3	1	2	6
6	United States	1	3	3	7
7	Portugal	1	2	0	3
8	Germany	1	0	1	2
9	South Africa	0	7	0	7
10	Brazil	0	3	4	7
11	Hungary	0	3	1	4
12	Chinese Taipei	0	2	0	2
13	Romania	0	1	1	2
14	Cyprus	0	0	2	2
15	France	0	0	1	1
15	Kazakhstan	0	0	1	1
15	South Korea	0	0	1	1
Totals (17 entries)		42	44	42	128

Source: Medal Standings

=== Men's events ===
Event	Gold		Silver		Bronze	
50 m freestyle	Giovanni Izzo; Italy	22.17	Lucas Peixoto; Brazil	22.38	Jokūbas Keblys; Lithuania	22.39
100 m freestyle	Kamil Sieradzki; Poland	49.08	Giovanni Carraro; Italy	49.18	Lucas Peixoto; Brazil Mateusz Chowaniec; Poland	49.34
200 m freestyle	Kamil Sieradzki; Poland	1:47.60	Tomas Navikonis; Lithuania	1:47.73	Giovanni Caserta; Italy	1:48.01
400 m freestyle	Matteo Lamberti; Italy	3:48.65	Eduardo de Moraes; Brazil	3:49.10	Ikki Imoto; Japan	3:49.66
800 m freestyle	Matteo Lamberti; Italy	7:54.12	Kaito Tabuchi; Japan	7:57.37	Ivan Giovannoni; Italy	8:00.00
1500 m freestyle	Ivan Giovannoni; Italy	15:11.81	Kaito Tabuchi; Japan	15:14.60	Christopher Nagy; United States	15:19.23
50 m backstroke	Simone Stefanì; Italy	24.98	Andrei Anghel; Romania	25.06	Michele Lamberti; Italy	25.09
100 m backstroke	Simone Stefanì; Italy	53.95	Michele Lamberti; Italy	54.02	Denis Popescu; Romania	54.21
200 m backstroke	Jackson Jones; United States	1:57.66	Kodai Nishiono; Japan	1:58.08	Kim Seong-ju; South Korea	1:59.99
50 m breaststroke	Qin Haiyang; China	26.53	Ludovico Viberti; Italy	27.32	Alessandro Pinzuti; Italy	27.53
100 m breaststroke	Qin Haiyang; China	58.92	Jan Kałusowski; Poland	59.86 NR	Andrius Šidlauskas; Lithuania	59.89
200 m breaststroke	Qin Haiyang; China	2:08.09 GR	Yu Hanaguruma; Japan	2:10.31	Yamato Fukasawa; Japan	2:10.39
50 m butterfly	Luca Armbruster; Germany	23.22	Jakub Majerski; Poland Lorenzo Gargani; Italy	23.39	No medal awarded	
100 m butterfly	Jakub Majerski; Poland	51.41	Adrian Jaśkiewicz; Poland	51.93	Adilbek Mussin; Kazakhstan	52.03
200 m butterfly	Takumi Terada; Japan	1:55.66	Wang Kuan-hung; Chinese Taipei	1:55.69	Chen Juner; China	1:56.16
200 m individual medley	Gabriel Lopes; Portugal	1:59.12	Wang Hsing-hao; Chinese Taipei	2:00.00	Marius Zobel; Germany	2:00.56
400 m individual medley	Kaito Tabuchi; Japan	4:15.12	Pier Andrea Matteazzi; Italy	4:15.64	Ei Kamikawabata; Japan	4:17.87
4 × 100 m freestyle relay	Poland; Kamil Sieradzki; Dominik Dudys; Mateusz Chowaniec; Jakub Kraska; Piotr Ludwiczak; Marcel Wągrowski	3:14.60	Brazil; Pedro Spajari; Lucas Peixoto; Breno Correia; Vinícius Assunção	3:15.30	Italy; Paolo Conte Bonin; Giovanni Carraro; Nicolò Franceschi; Giovanni Izzo	3:15.62
4 × 200 m freestyle relay	Japan; Konosuke Yanagimoto; Ikki Imoto; Genki Terakado; Shui Kurokawa; Temma Watanabe	7:14.86	Italy; Alessio Proietti Colonna; Giovanni Caserta; Matteo Lamberti; Davide Marchello	7:15.34	Brazil; Breno Correia; Vinícius Assunção; Eduardo de Moraes; Kaique Alves; Matheus Gonche	7:15.39
4 × 100 m medley relay	China; Wang Gukailai; Qin Haiyang; Chen Juner; Lin Tao; Zhang Zhoujian; Yu Zongda; Wang Yi	3:32.58 GR	Italy; Simone Stefanì; Alessandro Pinzuti; Christian Ferraro; Giovanni Izzo; Michele Lamberti; Ludovico Viberti; Michele Busa; Giovanni Carraro	3:33.14	Japan; Riku Matsuyama; Yamato Fukasawa; Genki Terakado; Juran Mizohata; Konosuke Yanagimoto; Yu Hanaguruma; Takumi Terada; Reo Miura	3:35.04
AF African record | AM Americas record | AS Asian record | ER European record | OC Oceania record | UR Universiade record | WR World record | NR National record

^{a} Swimmers who participated in the heats only and received medals.

=== Women's events ===
Event	Gold		Silver		Bronze	
50 m freestyle	Zhang Yufei; China	24.29 GR	Erin Gallagher; South Africa	25.05	Kalia Antoniou; Cyprus	25.14
100 m freestyle	Zhang Yufei; China	53.34 GR	Erin Gallagher; South Africa	54.39	Kalia Antoniou; Cyprus	54.82
200 m freestyle	Liu Yaxin; China	1:56.84	Giulia D'Innocenzo; Italy	1:58.69	Océane Carnez; France	1:59.73
400 m freestyle	Li Bingjie; China	4:08.38	Ajna Késely; Hungary	4:09.50	Antonietta Cesarano; Italy	4:10.49
800 m freestyle	Li Bingjie; China	8:30.74	Duné Coetzee; South Africa	8:32.88	Noemi Cesarano; Italy	8:33.12
1500 m freestyle	Li Bingjie; China	16:18.48	Ichika Kajimoto; Japan	16:23.02	Noemi Cesarano; Italy	16:23.16
50 m backstroke	Adela Piskorska; Poland	27.84 GR	Paulina Peda; Poland Anya Mostek; United States	28.48	No medal awarded	
100 m backstroke	Adela Piskorska; Poland	1:00.20	Camila Rebelo; Portugal	1:00.52 NR	Federica Toma; Italy	1:00.65
200 m backstroke	Liu Yaxin; China	2:08.18	Camila Rebelo; Portugal	2:10.47	Eszter Szabó-Feltóthy; Hungary	2:10.77
50 m breaststroke	Kotryna Teterevkova; Lithuania	30.58	Dominika Sztandera; Poland	31.02	Jhennifer Conceição; Brazil	31.11
100 m breaststroke	Kotryna Teterevkova; Lithuania	1:06.74	Kaylene Corbett; South Africa	1:06.98	Dominika Sztandera; Poland	1:07.19
200 m breaststroke	Kotryna Teterevkova; Lithuania	2:22.86 NR	Kaylene Corbett; South Africa	2:22.99	Zhu Leiju; China	2:28.71
50 m butterfly	Zhang Yufei; China	25.20 GR	Erin Gallagher; South Africa	25.66	Viola Scotto di Carlo; Italy	26.01
100 m butterfly	Zhang Yufei; China	56.57 GR	Erin Gallagher; South Africa	57.64	Giulia D'Innocenzo; Italy	58.33
200 m butterfly	Antonella Crispino; Italy	2:09.10	Dalma Sebestyén; Hungary	2:09.12	Chiho Mizuguchi; Japan	2:09.65
200 m individual medley	Anita Gastaldi; Italy	2:12.74	Dalma Sebestyén; Hungary	2:13.44	Caroline Theil; United States	2:14.28
400 m individual medley	Ichika Kajimoto; Japan	4:41.65	Megan van Berkom; United States	4:42.47	Paige MacEachern; United States	4:45.81
4 × 100 m freestyle relay	China; Li Bingjie; Liu Yaxin; Luo Youyang; Zhang Yufei; Zhang Yifan	3:37.51 GR	Italy; Anita Gastaldi; Viola Scotto di Carlo; Paola Biagioli; Giulia D'Innocenzo; Antonietta Cesarano	3:38.81	Japan; Momoka Yoshii; Hazuki Yamamoto; Riru Kubota; Shiho Matsumoto	3:41.83
4 × 200 m freestyle relay	China; Liu Yaxin; Jing Shangbeihua; Zhang Yufei; Li Bingjie; Gao Xing; Zhang Yifan; Chen Keyi	7:58.77	United States; Amy Tang; Megan van Berkom; Mackenzie Hodges; Paige MacEachern; Noelle Harvey; Sabrina Johnston	8:02.28	Japan; Momoka Yoshii; Shiho Matsumoto; Kanon Nagao; Ichika Kajimoto; Hazuki Yamamoto	8:04.29
4 × 100 m medley relay	China; Liu Yaxin; Zhu Leiju; Zhang Yufei; Li Bingjie; Zheng Muyan; Luo Youyang; Jing Shangbeihua; Gao Xing	3:59.67	Poland; Adela Piskorska; Dominika Sztandera; Paulina Peda; Kornelia Fiedkiewicz; Wiktoria Piotrowska; Aleksandra Knop	4:00.67	Japan; Yumi Shuno; Haruna Ogata; Natsuki Hiroshita; Shiho Matsumoto; Hazuki Yamamoto Italy; Federica Toma; Anita Gastaldi; Giulia D'Innocenzo; Viola Scotto di Carlo; Francesca Pasquino; Alessia Ferraguti; Anna Pirovano; Paola Biagioli	4:02.82 4:04.82
AF African record | AM Americas record | AS Asian record | ER European record | OC Oceania record | UR Universiade record | WR World record | NR National record

^{a} Swimmers who participated in the heats only and received medals.

=== Mixed events ===
Event	Gold		Silver		Bronze	
4 × 100 m freestyle relay	China; Chen Juner; Lin Tao; Li Bingjie; Zhang Yufei; Zhao Xinchen; Luo Youyang; Chen Mingjie; Ma Yiyi	3:25.38 NR	Italy; Giovanni Izzo; Giovanni Carraro; Paola Biagioli; Anita Gastaldi; Nicolò Franceschi; Paolo Conte Bonin; Linda Caponi; Sonia Laquintana	3:26.75	Brazil; Vinícius Assunção; Breno Correia; Luanna Oliveira; Fernanda Celidônio; Marco Júnior	3:27.82
4 × 100 m medley relay	China; Wang Gukailai; Qin Haiyang; Zhang Yufei; Li Bingjie; Song Jiale; Lin Tao; Jing Shangbeihua; Liu Yaxin	3:44.02	Poland; Kacper Stokowski; Dominika Sztandera; Jakub Majerski; Kornelia Fiedkiewicz; Wiktoria Piotrowska; Marcin Goraj; Wiktoria Guść; Dawid Wiekiera	3:46.07	Italy; Simone Stefanì; Alessandro Pinzuti; Giulia D'Innocenzo; Viola Scotto di Carlo; Lorenzo Glessi; Alessandro Fusco; Antonella Crispino; Antonietta Cesarano	3:47.25
AF African record | AM Americas record | AS Asian record | ER European record | OC Oceania record | UR Universiade record | WR World record | NR National record

^{a} Swimmers who participated in the heats only and received medals.

== Participating nations ==
465 swimmers from 55 nations:

- Argentina (1)
- Armenia (2)
- Austria (5)
- Azerbaijan (2)
- Brazil (27)
- China (35)
- Chinese Taipei (13)
- Colombia (2)
- Comoros (1)
- Cyprus (4)
- Czech Republic (5)
- Denmark (1)
- Estonia (4)
- Finland (4)
- France (6)
- Georgia (4)
- Germany (6)
- Greece (4)
- Guatemala (2)
- Hong Kong (15)
- Honduras (2)
- Hungary (7)
- India (24)
- Indonesia (9)
- Italy (36)
- Japan (32)
- Kazakhstan (5)
- Kuwait (2)
- Lebanon (4)
- Liechtenstein (1)
- Lithuania (5)
- Macau (6)
- Malaysia (2)
- Moldova (2)
- Mongolia (9)
- Netherlands (3)
- Oman (4)
- Poland (21)
- Portugal (4)
- Romania (6)
- Senegal (2)
- Sierra Leone (1)
- Singapore (13)
- Slovakia (4)
- South Africa (23)
- South Korea (22)
- Sri Lanka (3)
- Sweden (5)
- Switzerland (16)
- Tanzania (1)
- Turkmenistan (3)
- Uganda (3)
- United States (37)
- Uruguay (2)
- Zimbabwe (2)
