= Table tennis at the 2021 Summer World University Games =

Table tennis at the Chengdu 2021 FISU World University Games
- Venue: High-tech Zone Sports Centre Gymnasium
- Dates: 29 July – 5 August 2023

Table tennis was contested at the 2021 Summer World University Games from 29 July – 5 August 2023 at the High-tech Zone Sports Centre Gymnasium in Chengdu.

== Medal summary ==
=== Medal table ===
Rank	Nation	Gold	Silver	Bronze	Total
1	China (CHN)	7	3	3	13
2	Japan (JPN)	0	3	3	6
3	Chinese Taipei (TPE)	0	1	2	3
4	Hong Kong (HKG)	0	0	2	2
5	Germany (GER)	0	0	1	1
5	Thailand (THA)	0	0	1	1
5	Turkey (TUR)	0	0	1	1
5	United States (USA)	0	0	1	1
Totals (8 entries)		7	7	14	28

Source: Medal&Rank

=== Events ===
Event	Gold	Silver	Bronze
Men's singles	Zhou Kai; China	Xu Yingbin; China	Xue Fei; China
Men's singles	Zhou Kai; China	Xu Yingbin; China	Yang Chia-an; Chinese Taipei
Women's singles	Qian Tianyi; China	Kyoka Idesawa; Japan	Zhao Shang; China
Women's singles	Qian Tianyi; China	Kyoka Idesawa; Japan	Orawan Paranang; Thailand
Men's doubles	China (CHN); Xu Yingbin; Xue Fei	Japan (JPN); Kazuki Hamada; Yuma Tanigaki	Turkey (TUR); İbrahim Gündüz; Abdullah Yigenler
Men's doubles	China (CHN); Xu Yingbin; Xue Fei	Japan (JPN); Kazuki Hamada; Yuma Tanigaki	China (CHN); Liu Dingshuo; Zhou Kai
Women's doubles	China (CHN); Qian Tianyi; Zhao Shang	China (CHN); He Zhuojia; Wang Xiaotong	United States (USA); Rachel Sung; Amy Wang
Women's doubles	China (CHN); Qian Tianyi; Zhao Shang	China (CHN); He Zhuojia; Wang Xiaotong	Japan (JPN); Aoi Kurono; Akari Motoi
Mixed doubles	China (CHN); Liu Dingshuo; Qian Tianyi	China (CHN); Xue Fei; Wang Xiaotong	Hong Kong (HKG); Ho Kwan Kit; Doo Hoi Kem
Mixed doubles	China (CHN); Liu Dingshuo; Qian Tianyi	China (CHN); Xue Fei; Wang Xiaotong	Japan (JPN); Shodai Miyagawa; Kyoka Idesawa
Men's team	China (CHN); Liu Dingshuo; Man Pai; Xue Fei; Xu Yingbin; Zhou Kai	Chinese Taipei (TPE); Yang Tzu-yi; Li Hsin-yang; Huang Yan-cheng; Yang Chia-an; Wang Chen-you	Germany (GER); Nils Hohmeier; Kirill Fadeev; Florian Bluhm; Tobias Hippler; Pekka Pelz
Men's team	China (CHN); Liu Dingshuo; Man Pai; Xue Fei; Xu Yingbin; Zhou Kai	Chinese Taipei (TPE); Yang Tzu-yi; Li Hsin-yang; Huang Yan-cheng; Yang Chia-an; Wang Chen-you	Japan (JPN); Yuta Tanaka; Shodai Miyagawa; Yuma Tanigaki; Jo Yokotani; Kazuki Hamada
Women's team	China (CHN); He Zhuojia; Qian Tianyi; Wang Xiaotong; Yang Shilu; Zhao Shang	Japan (JPN); Korono Aoi; Funaba Sayaka; Idesawa Kyoka; Motoyi Akari; Kimura Kasumi	Hong Kong (HKG); Lam Yee Lok; Ng Wing Lam; Lee Hoi Man; Doo Hoi Kem; Soo Wai Yam
Women's team	China (CHN); He Zhuojia; Qian Tianyi; Wang Xiaotong; Yang Shilu; Zhao Shang	Japan (JPN); Korono Aoi; Funaba Sayaka; Idesawa Kyoka; Motoyi Akari; Kimura Kasumi	Chinese Taipei (TPE); Huang Yu-jie; Chien Tung-chuan; Huang Yu-wen; Huang Yu-chiao; Lin Yu-jhun
