= He Zhuojia =

Chinese table tennis player

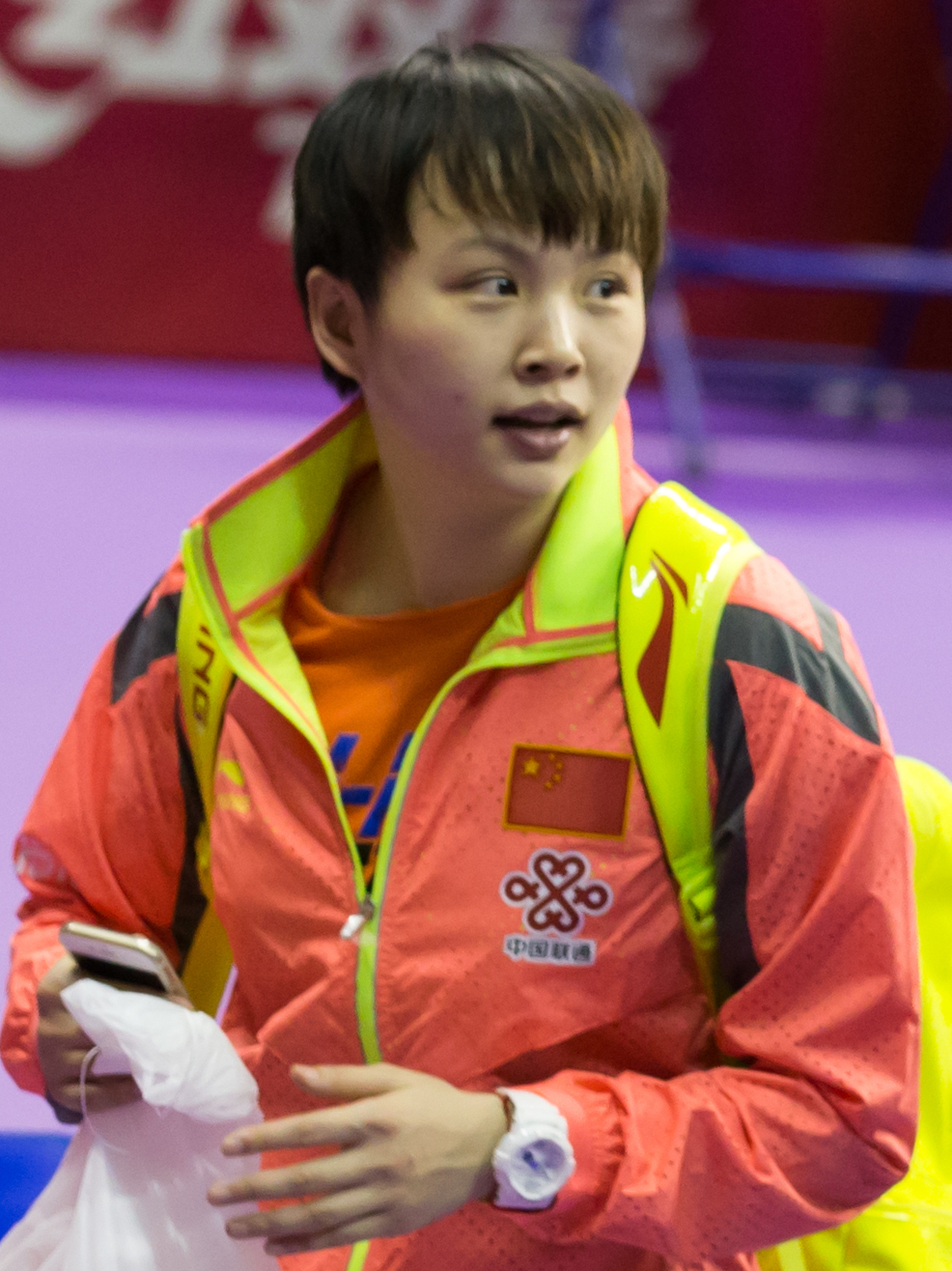
- He Zhuojia at the 2016 World Championships

Personal information
- Born: 25 October 1998 (age 27) Shijiazhuang, Hebei, China

Sport
- Sport: Table tennis
- Playing style: Right-handed shakehand grip
- Highest ranking: 13 (November 2019)
- Current ranking: 23 (15 July 2025)
Medal record
Women's table tennis
Representing China
World University Games
Gold medal – first place	2021 Chengdu	Team
Silver medal – second place	2021 Chengdu	Doubles

He Zhuojia (Chinese: 何卓佳; pinyin: Hé Zhuójiā, born 25 October 1998) is a Chinese table tennis player. She is one of the few top players utilizing long pips.

She won the 2014 Argentina Open when she was 15 years old. She also had a memorable run at the 2018 ITTF World Tour Grand Finals, where she knocked out three higher-seeded players before losing to Chen Meng in the final.

== Singles titles ==
Year	Tournament	Final opponent	Score	Ref
2014	ITTF World Tour, Argentina Open	(China) Fan Siqi	4–2	
2019	ITTF Challenge, Polish Open	(China) Chen Yi	4–1	
2022	WTT Feeder European Summer Series	(Japan) Honoka Hashimoto	4–2	
2023	WTT Feeder Doha	(China) Kuai Man	3–1	
2023	WTT Feeder Panagyurishte	(China) Han Feier	3–0	
2023	WTT Feeder Düsseldorf III	(Germany) Shan Xiaona	3–2	
