= Reo Nishida =

Japanese diver (born 2000)

Personal information
- Nationality: Japan
- Born: 16 July 2000 (age 26)

Sport
- Sport: Diving
- Event: 10 metre springboard
Medal record
World Championships
| Bronze medal – third place | 2025 Singapore | Team |
World University Games
| Silver medal – second place | 2021 Chengdu | 10 m mixed synchro |
| Silver medal – second place | 2021 Chengdu | Mixed team |
| Bronze medal – third place | 2021 Chengdu | 10 m synchro |
| Bronze medal – third place | 2021 Chengdu | Team |

Reo Nishida (西田 玲雄, Nishida Reo, born 16 July 2000) is a Japanese diver. He competed in the 2020 Summer Olympics.
