= Zhang Minjie =

Chinese diver (born 2004)

Personal information
- Nationality: Chinese
- Born: 28 August 2004 (age 21)

Sport
- Country: China
- Sport: Diving
- Event: 10 metre synchronized platform
Medal record
Women's diving
Representing China
World Championships
Gold medal – first place	2023 Fukuoka	Team
Gold medal – first place	2025 Singapore	10 m synchro
Asian Games
Gold medal – first place	2018 Jakarta-Palembang	10 m synchro
World University Games
Gold medal – first place	2021 Chengdu	10 m synchro
Gold medal – first place	2021 Chengdu	Team

Zhang Minjie (born 28 August 2004) is a Chinese diver.

== Career ==
Zhang competed the 2018 Asian Games and won a gold medal in the 10 metre synchro platform event, along with Zhang Jiaqi. She competed in diving at the 2021 Summer World University Games, which was postponed until 2023, and won gold medals in the 10 metre synchro platform and team events.

She made her World Aquatics Championships debut in 2023 and won a gold medal in the team event with a score of 489.65. She again competed at the 2025 World Aquatics Championships and won a gold medal in the 10 metre synchro platform event, along with Chen Yuxi, with a score of 349.26. This was China's 14th consecutive win in the event at the World Championships.
