= Shiho Matsumoto =

Japanese swimmer

Personal information
- Nationality: Japanese
- Born: 3 April 2002 (age 24) Tokyo, Japan
- Education: Waseda University

Sport
- Sport: Swimming
- Strokes: Individual medley, freestyle
- Club: Tokyo Dome Sports
Medal record
Women's swimming
Representing Japan
Asian Games
Silver medal – second place	2026 Aichi–Nagoya	4×100 m mixed medley
Bronze medal – third place	2026 Aichi–Nagoya	4×100 m freestyle
World University Games
Bronze medal – third place	2021 Chengdu	4×100 m freestyle
Bronze medal – third place	2021 Chengdu	4×100 m medley
Bronze medal – third place	2021 Chengdu	4×200 m freestyle

Shiho Matsumoto (Japanese: 松本信歩; born 3 April 2002) is a Japanese competitive swimmer who specialises in the individual medley and freestyle events. She represented Japan at the 2024 Summer Olympics in Paris and the 2026 Asian Games in Aichi–Nagoya. At the 2026 Asian Games, she won a silver medal in the mixed 4 × 100 metre medley relay and a bronze medal in the women's 4 × 100 metre freestyle relay.

== Career ==
Matsumoto began swimming at the age of five and developed as an individual medley specialist. She attended Waseda University, where she studied sports sciences and competed for the university's swimming team. During her university career, she won the women's 200 metre individual medley at the Japan Intercollegiate Swimming Championships four consecutive times.

In 2023, Matsumoto represented Japan at the Summer World University Games in Chengdu, China, which were held in 2023. She competed in individual medley and relay events, winning three bronze medals in relay competitions according to her competition record.

At the 2024 Japanese Olympic swimming trials, Matsumoto finished second in the women's 200 metre individual medley in 2:09.90, securing selection for the 2024 Summer Olympics.

At the Paris Olympics, Matsumoto competed in the women's 200 metre individual medley. She advanced to the semifinals and finished 14th overall with a time of 2:11.85, missing qualification for the final.

Matsumoto continued to compete internationally after graduating from Waseda University. She represented Japan at the 2025 World Aquatics Championships in the women's 200 metre individual medley. At the 2026 Japan Swimming Championships, she won the women's 200 metre individual medley title and finished second in the 100 metre freestyle, helping secure her selection for international competitions that year.

At the 2026 Asian Games in Aichi–Nagoya, Matsumoto finished seventh in the women's 100 metre freestyle and fourth in the women's 200 metre individual medley. She also contributed to Japan's relay results, winning bronze in the women's 4 × 100 metre freestyle relay and silver in the mixed 4 × 100 metre medley relay.
