= Tai Xiaohu =

Chinese diver (born 1998)

Personal information
- Native name: 台晓虎
- Nationality: Chinese
- Born: March 1, 1998 (age 28) Gaomi, Shandong

Sport
- Country: China
- Sport: Diving
- Events: 10 metres & 10 metres sync
Medal record
Mixed diving
Representing China
World Championships
Gold medal – first place	2015 Kazan	10 m sync mixed
Asian Championships
Gold medal – first place	2025 Ahmedabad	1 m springboard
Silver medal – second place	2025 Ahmedabad	3 m springboard
World University Games
Gold medal – first place	2021 Chengdu	1 m springboard
Gold medal – first place	2021 Chengdu	Team

Tai Xiaohu (simplified Chinese: 台晓虎; traditional Chinese: 台曉虎; pinyin: Tái Xiǎohǔ; born 1 March 1998 in Gaomi) is a male Chinese diver specializing in 10 metre synchronized event. He four times won the champions at FINA Diving World Series, twice the goldlists for men's 10 metre platform synchro events in 2014 and 2015, twice the first for men's 10 metre platform synchro mixed events in 2015 and 2016.
