= Yu Hanaguruma =

Japanese swimmer (born 2000)

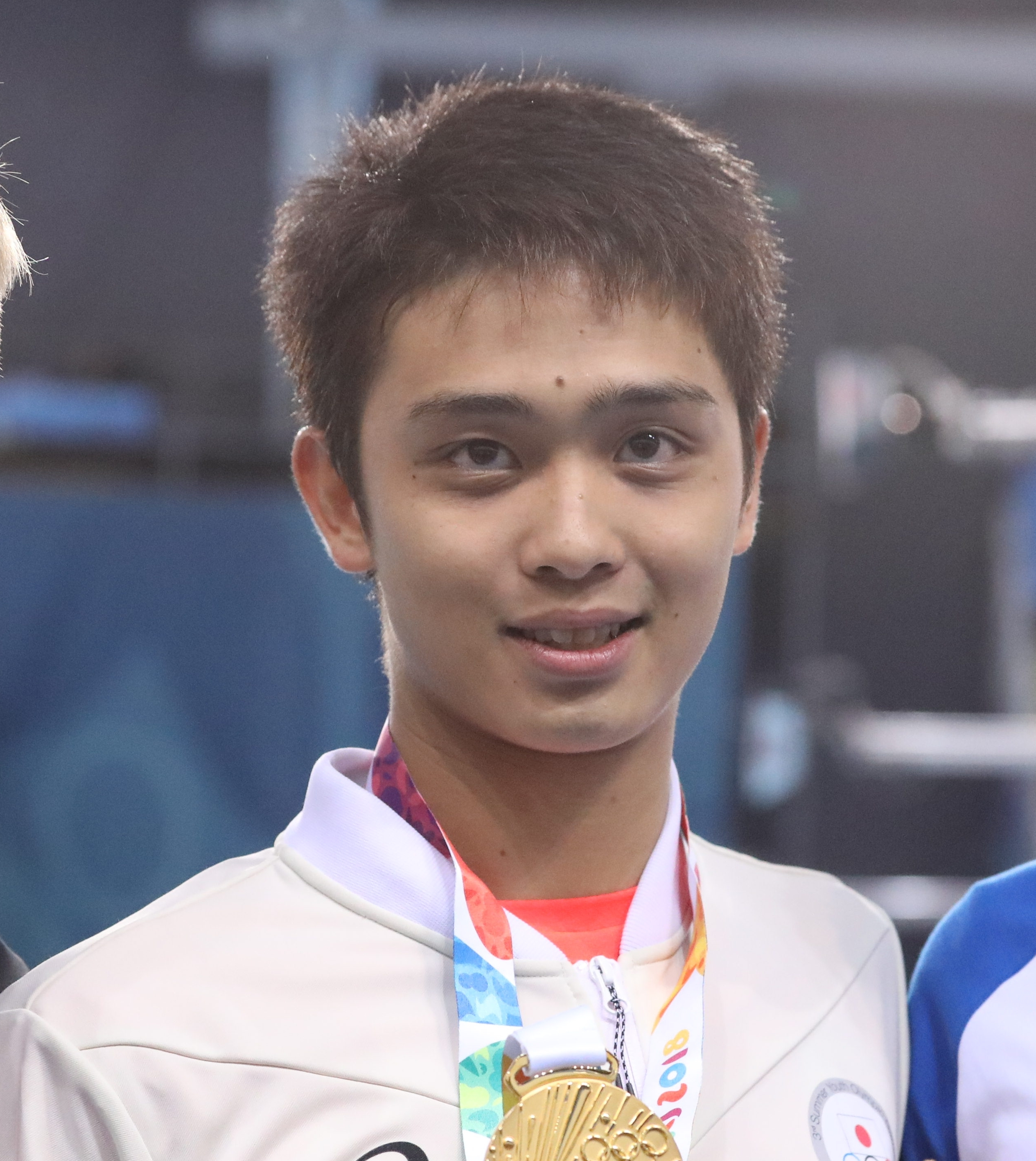
- Hanaguruma in 2018

Personal information
- Born: 28 January 2000 (age 26) Sakaide, Japan
- Height: 1.81 m (5 ft 11 in)

Sport
- Country: Japan
- Sport: Swimming
Medal record
Swimming
Representing Japan
World Championships (LC)
Silver medal – second place	2022 Budapest	200 m breaststroke
Youth Olympic Games
Gold medal – first place	2018 Buenos Aires	200 m breaststroke
Bronze medal – third place	2018 Buenos Aires	4×100 m mixed medley
World University Games
Silver medal – second place	2021 Chengdu	200 m breaststroke
Bronze medal – third place	2021 Chengdu	4×100 m medley

Yu Hanaguruma (Japanese: 花車 優, Hepburn: Hanaguruma Yū; born 28 January 2000) is a Japanese swimmer. He participated at the 2018 Summer Youth Olympics in the swimming competition, being awarded the bronze and gold medal in the boys' 200 metre breaststroke and mixed 4 × 100 metre medley relay events. Hanaguruma also participated at the 2022 World Aquatics Championships in the swimming competition, being awarded the silver medal in the men's 200 metre breaststroke event.
