= Chen Jia =

Chinese diver (born 2004)

Personal information
- Nationality: Chinese
- Born: 12 September 2004 (age 22)

Sport
- Country: China
- Sport: Diving
- Events: 3 m springboard, 3 m synchro
Medal record
Women's diving
Representing China
World Championships
Gold medal – first place	2025 Singapore	3 m synchro
Silver medal – second place	2025 Singapore	3 m springboard
Asian Games
Gold medal – first place	2026 Aichi-Nagoya	3 m synchro
Silver medal – second place	2026 Aichi-Nagoya	3 m springboard
World University Games
Gold medal – first place	2021 Chengdu	1 m springboard
Gold medal – first place	2021 Chengdu	3 m synchro
Gold medal – first place	2021 Chengdu	Team

Chen Jia (born 12 September 2004) is a Chinese diver.

== Career ==
Chen competed at 2021 Summer World University Games, which was postponed until 2023, and won gold medals in the 1 metre springboard, 3 metre synchro platform and team events.

She made her World Aquatics Championships debut in 2025 and won a gold medal in the 3 metre synchro event, along with Chen Yiwen, and a silver medal in the 3 metre springboard event with a score of 356.40.
