= Water polo at the 2021 Summer World University Games – Women's tournament =

Water polo tournament

Women's water polo at the Chengdu 2021 FISU World University Games
- Venue: Xindu Xiangcheng Sports Centre Natatorium
- Dates: 30 July–7 August 2023
- Teams: 6

Medalists
1st place, gold medalist(s)		China
2nd place, silver medalist(s)		Italy
3rd place, bronze medalist(s)		Australia

Women's water polo at the 2021 Summer World University Games was held in Chengdu, China. Games were in the Xindu Xiangcheng Sports Centre Natatorium and Modern Pentathlon Centre Swimming & Fencing Hall from 30 July to 7 August 2023. The dates for all events were changed due to the COVID pandemic.

== Results ==
All times are local (UTC+08:00).

=== Preliminary round ===
Team	Pts	Pld	W	D	L	GF	GA	GD
China	15	5	5	0	0	108	25	83
Italy	12	5	4	0	1	98	32	66
Japan	9	5	3	0	2	61	55	6
Australia	6	5	2	0	3	38	67	−29
South Africa	3	5	1	0	4	37	93	−56
Singapore	0	5	0	0	5	18	112	−94

30 July 2023; 10:00	South Africa	4–7	Australia	XinduXiangcheng Sports Centre Natatorium
30 July 2023; 10:00	Score by quarters: 0–2, 1–1, 2–3, 1–1			XinduXiangcheng Sports Centre Natatorium

30 July 2023; 11:45	Italy	18–6	Japan	XinduXiangcheng Sports Centre Natatorium
30 July 2023; 11:45	Score by quarters: 4–1, 2–0, 7–1, 5–4			XinduXiangcheng Sports Centre Natatorium

30 July 2023; 13:30	China	26–1	Singapore	XinduXiangcheng Sports Centre Natatorium
30 July 2023; 13:30	Score by quarters: 8–0, 7–0, 7–1, 4–0			XinduXiangcheng Sports Centre Natatorium

31 July 2023; 10:00	Japan	15–9	South Africa	XinduXiangcheng Sports Centre Natatorium
31 July 2023; 10:00	Score by quarters: 6–2, 5–2, 2–2, 2–3			XinduXiangcheng Sports Centre Natatorium

31 July 2023; 11:45	Australia	17–6	Singapore	XinduXiangcheng Sports Centre Natatorium
31 July 2023; 11:45	Score by quarters: 5–2, 5–1, 4–1, 3–2			XinduXiangcheng Sports Centre Natatorium

31 July 2023; 13:30	Italy	8–17	China	XinduXiangcheng Sports Centre Natatorium
31 July 2023; 13:30	Score by quarters: 4–7, 1–3, 0–4, 3–3			XinduXiangcheng Sports Centre Natatorium

2 August 2023; 10:00	Japan	5–19	China	XinduXiangcheng Sports Centre Natatorium
2 August 2023; 10:00	Score by quarters: 0–5, 2–5, 3–3, 0–6			XinduXiangcheng Sports Centre Natatorium

2 August 2023; 11:45	Australia	3–19	Italy	XinduXiangcheng Sports Centre Natatorium
2 August 2023; 11:45	Score by quarters: 2–3, 1–5, 0–5, 0–6			XinduXiangcheng Sports Centre Natatorium

2 August 2023; 13:30	Singapore	4–17	South Africa	XinduXiangcheng Sports Centre Natatorium
2 August 2023; 13:30	Score by quarters: 1–4, 2–3, 0–3, 1–7			XinduXiangcheng Sports Centre Natatorium

3 August 2023; 10:00	Italy	33–2	Singapore	XinduXiangcheng Sports Centre Natatorium
3 August 2023; 10:00	Score by quarters: 9–0, 8–1, 8–0, 8–1			XinduXiangcheng Sports Centre Natatorium

3 August 2023; 11:45	South Africa	4–24	China	XinduXiangcheng Sports Centre Natatorium
3 August 2023; 11:45	Score by quarters: 0–4, 3–5, 0–6, 1–9			XinduXiangcheng Sports Centre Natatorium

3 August 2023; 13:30	Japan	16–4	Australia	XinduXiangcheng Sports Centre Natatorium
3 August 2023; 13:30	Score by quarters: 3–1, 2–1, 9–0, 2–2			XinduXiangcheng Sports Centre Natatorium

4 August 2023; 10:00	South Africa	4–20	Italy	XinduXiangcheng Sports Centre Natatorium
4 August 2023; 10:00	Score by quarters: 0-7, 0-6, 3-5, 1-2			XinduXiangcheng Sports Centre Natatorium

4 August 2023; 11:45	China	22–7	Australia	XinduXiangcheng Sports Centre Natatorium
4 August 2023; 11:45	Score by quarters: 7-1, 6-2, 5-3, 4-1			XinduXiangcheng Sports Centre Natatorium

4 August 2023; 13:30	Singapore	5–19	Japan	XinduXiangcheng Sports Centre Natatorium
4 August 2023; 13:30	Score by quarters: 2-6, 0-6, 0-3, 3-4			XinduXiangcheng Sports Centre Natatorium

=== Knock-out stage ===
==== Brackets ====
- Main bracket

Semifinals
1	China	20
4	Australia	6
3	Japan	2
2	Italy	21

Gold medal final
China	12
Italy	7
Bronze medal final
Australia	7
Japan	6

==== Semifinals ====
6 August 2023; 19:00	China	20–6	Australia	XinduXiangcheng Sports Centre Natatorium
6 August 2023; 19:00	Score by quarters: 6-0, 3-0, 4-3, 7-3			XinduXiangcheng Sports Centre Natatorium

6 August 2023; 20:30	Italy	21–2	Japan	XinduXiangcheng Sports Centre Natatorium
6 August 2023; 20:30	Score by quarters: 8-2, 3-0, 6-0, 4-0			XinduXiangcheng Sports Centre Natatorium

==== Finals ====
- 5-6th final

6 August 2023; 10:00	Singapore	5–14	South Africa	XinduXiangcheng Sports Centre Natatorium
6 August 2023; 10:00	Score by quarters: 1-4, 1-5, 2-1, 1-4			XinduXiangcheng Sports Centre Natatorium

- Bronze medal match

7 August 2023; 16:30	Australia	7–6	Japan	Modern Pentathlon Centre Swimming & Fencing Hall
7 August 2023; 16:30	Score by quarters: 3-1, 0-2, 2-1, 2-2			Modern Pentathlon Centre Swimming & Fencing Hall

- Gold medal match

7 August 2023; 18:30	China	12–7	Italy	Modern Pentathlon Centre Swimming & Fencing Hall
7 August 2023; 18:30	Score by quarters: 5-2, 3-2, 3-2, 1-1			Modern Pentathlon Centre Swimming & Fencing Hall

== Final standing ==
Rank	Team
1st place, gold medalist(s)	China
2nd place, silver medalist(s)	Italy
3rd place, bronze medalist(s)	Australia
4	Japan
5	South Africa
6	Singapore
