= Basketball at the 2021 Summer World University Games – Women's tournament =

Women's basketball at the Chengdu 2021 FISU World University Games
- Venue: various
- Dates: 28 July – 5 August
- Teams: 12

Medalists
| 1st place, gold medalist(s) | | China |
| 2nd place, silver medalist(s) | | Japan |
| 3rd place, bronze medalist(s) | | Finland |

The women's tournament in basketball at the 2021 Summer World University Games in Chengdu, China was held from 28 July to 5 August.

== Preliminary round ==
| Qualified for the Final eight |
| Qualified for the Placement 9th–12th |

=== Pool A ===
| Team | Pld | W | L | PF | PA | PD | Pts |
|---|---|---|---|---|---|---|---|
| Japan | 2 | 2 | 0 | 164 | 115 | +49 | 4 |
| Hungary | 2 | 1 | 1 | 122 | 113 | +9 | 3 |
| Argentina | 2 | 0 | 2 | 105 | 163 | −58 | 2 |

28 July 2023
10:00 UTC+8

Boxscore

| Argentina | 49–63 | Hungary |
Scoring by quarter: 12–20, 21–9, 5–16, 11–18

Sichuan Gymnasium

29 July 2023
19:30 UTC+8

Boxscore

| Japan | 100–56 | Argentina |
Scoring by quarter: 27–12, 17–23, 25–12, 31–9

Qingbaijiang Sports Centre Gymnasium

30 July 2023
15:00 UTC+8

Boxscore

| Hungary | 59–64 | Japan |
Scoring by quarter: 15–17, 18–17, 16–20, 10–10

Qingbaijiang Sports Centre Gymnasium

=== Pool B ===
| Team | Pld | W | L | PF | PA | PD | Pts |
|---|---|---|---|---|---|---|---|
| Chinese Taipei | 2 | 2 | 0 | 150 | 136 | +14 | 4 |
| Czech Republic | 2 | 1 | 1 | 148 | 147 | +1 | 3 |
| Slovakia | 2 | 0 | 2 | 127 | 142 | −15 | 2 |

28 July 2023
10:00 UTC+8

Boxscore

| Chinese Taipei | 81–75 | Czech Republic |
Scoring by quarter: 12–20, 27–13, 19–21, 23–21

Qingbaijiang Sports Centre Gymnasium

29 July 2023
15:00 UTC+8

Boxscore

| Slovakia | 61–69 | Chinese Taipei |
Scoring by quarter: 15–15, 21–19, 12–24, 13–11

Fenghuangshan Sports Park Gymnasium

30 July 2023
19:30 UTC+8

Boxscore

| Czech Republic | 73–66 | Slovakia |
Scoring by quarter: 21–16, 17–13, 16–15, 19–22

Sichuan Gymnasium

=== Pool C ===
| Team | Pld | W | L | PF | PA | PD | Pts |
|---|---|---|---|---|---|---|---|
| Finland | 2 | 2 | 0 | 191 | 118 | +73 | 4 |
| Brazil | 2 | 1 | 1 | 140 | 148 | −8 | 3 |
| Romania | 2 | 0 | 2 | 114 | 179 | −65 | 2 |

28 July 2023
10:00 UTC+8

Boxscore

| Romania | 59–77 | Brazil |
Scoring by quarter: 6–24, 18–18, 22–17, 13–18

Qingshuihe Campus Gymnasium

29 July 2023
15:00 UTC+8

Boxscore

| Finland | 102–55 | Romania |
Scoring by quarter: 24–12, 33–18, 16–16, 29–9

Sichuan Gymnasium

30 July 2023
15:00 UTC+8

Boxscore

| Brazil | 63–89 | Finland |
Scoring by quarter: 11–27, 12–23, 18–27, 22–12

Qingshuihe Campus Gymnasium

=== Pool D ===
| Team | Pld | W | L | PF | PA | PD | Pts |
|---|---|---|---|---|---|---|---|
| China | 2 | 2 | 0 | 155 | 112 | +43 | 4 |
| Poland | 2 | 1 | 1 | 108 | 122 | −14 | 3 |
| Portugal | 2 | 0 | 2 | 113 | 142 | −29 | 2 |

28 July 2023
10:00 UTC+8

Boxscore

| Portugal | 63–83 | China |
Scoring by quarter: 27–24, 11–24, 11–19, 14–16

Fenghuangshan Sports Park Gymnasium

29 July 2023
19:30 UTC+8

Boxscore

| Poland | 59–50 | Portugal |
Scoring by quarter: 17–8, 10–18, 21–19, 11–5

Qingshuihe Campus Gymnasium

30 July 2023
15:00 UTC+8

Boxscore

| China | 72–49 | Poland |
Scoring by quarter: 19–11, 18–18, 19–13, 16–7

Fenghuangshan Sports Park Gymnasium

== 9th to 12th place classification ==
| Team | Pld | W | L | PF | PA | PD | Pts |
|---|---|---|---|---|---|---|---|
| Portugal | 3 | 3 | 0 | 235 | 175 | +60 | 6 |
| Argentina | 3 | 2 | 1 | 207 | 188 | +19 | 5 |
| Romania | 3 | 1 | 2 | 172 | 205 | −33 | 4 |
| Slovakia | 3 | 0 | 3 | 199 | 245 | −46 | 3 |

1 August 2023
15:00 UTC+8

Boxscore

| Slovakia | 63–67 | Romania |
Scoring by quarter: 14–24, 18–16, 16–22, 15–5

Qingbaijiang Sports Centre Gymnasium

1 August 2023
15:00 UTC+8

Boxscore

| Argentina | 54–68 | Portugal |
Scoring by quarter: 14–9, 10–19, 8–19, 22–21

Qingshuihe Campus Gymnasium

3 August 2023
15:00 UTC+8

Boxscore

| Argentina | 86–80 (OT) | Slovakia |
Scoring by quarter: 9–19, 33–16, 18–20, 15–20, Overtime: 11–5

Qingbaijiang Sports Centre Gymnasium

3 August 2023
19:30 UTC+8

Boxscore

| Portugal | 75–65 | Romania |
Scoring by quarter: 12–18, 23–15, 13–18, 27–14

Qingshuihe Campus Gymnasium

5 August 2023
11:00 UTC+8

Boxscore

| Slovakia | 56–92 | Portugal |
Scoring by quarter: 18–13, 8–26, 20–26, 10–27

Qingbaijiang Sports Centre Gymnasium

5 August 2023
11:00 UTC+8

Boxscore

| Romania | 40–67 | Argentina |
Scoring by quarter: 12–17, 7–10, 11–14, 10–26

Qingshuihe Campus Gymnasium

== 1st to 8th place classification ==
=== Bracket ===
5th place
Poland | 52
Hungary | 64
7th place
Czech Republic | 79
Brazil | 74

5–8th place semifinals
Czech Republic | 52
Poland | 71
Hungary | 66
Brazil | 61

Quarterfinals
A1 | Japan | 88
B2 | Czech Republic | 63
C1 | Finland | 80
D2 | Poland | 69
B1 | Chinese Taipei | 75
A2 | Hungary | 72
D1 | China | 84
C2 | Brazil | 64

Semifinals
Japan | 69
Finland | 56
Chinese Taipei | 61
China | 83

Gold medal match
Japan | 91
China | 99
Bronze medal match
Finland | 56
Chinese Taipei | 49

=== Quarterfinals ===
1 August 2023
19:30 UTC+8

Boxscore

| Brazil | 64–84 | China |
Scoring by quarter: 21–24, 11–23, 19–20, 13–17

Fenghuangshan Sports Park Gymnasium

1 August 2023
19:30 UTC+8

Boxscore

| Hungary | 72–75 | Chinese Taipei |
Scoring by quarter: 16–15, 23–17, 16–27, 17–16

Sichuan Gymnasium

1 August 2023
19:30 UTC+8

Boxscore

| Finland | 80–69 | Poland |
Scoring by quarter: 13–23, 29–19, 19–17, 19–10

Qingshuihe Campus Gymnasium

1 August 2023
19:30 UTC+8

Boxscore

| Japan | 88–63 | Czech Republic |
Scoring by quarter: 20–11, 28–25, 22–11, 18–16

Qingbaijiang Sports Centre Gymnasium

=== 5–8th place semifinals ===
3 August 2023
19:30 UTC+8

Boxscore

| Brazil | 61–66 | Hungary |
Scoring by quarter: 16–12, 14–19, 12–22, 19–13

Qingbaijiang Sports Centre Gymnasium

3 August 2023
19:30 UTC+8

Boxscore

| Poland | 71–52 | Czech Republic |
Scoring by quarter: 17–3, 26–10, 15–17, 13–22

Sichuan Gymnasium

=== Semifinals ===
3 August 2023
15:00 UTC+8

Boxscore

| Finland | 56–69 | Japan |
Scoring by quarter: 12–17, 14–22, 16–20, 14–10

Fenghuangshan Sports Park Gymnasium

3 August 2023
19:30 UTC+8

Boxscore

| China | 83–61 | Chinese Taipei |
Scoring by quarter: 17–18, 26–17, 20–13, 20–13

Fenghuangshan Sports Park Gymnasium

=== 7th place game ===
5 August 2023
11:00 UTC+8

Boxscore

| Czech Republic | 79–74 | Brazil |
Scoring by quarter: 22–11, 23–22, 15–14, 19–27

Fenghuangshan Sports Park Gymnasium

=== 5th place game ===
5 August 2023
11:00 UTC+8

Boxscore

| Poland | 52–64 | Hungary |
Scoring by quarter: 12–19, 14–12, 19–15, 7–18

Sichuan Gymnasium

=== Bronze medal game ===
5 August 2023
15:00 UTC+8

Boxscore

| Finland | 56–49 | Chinese Taipei |
Scoring by quarter: 8–3, 15–16, 16–13, 17–17

Fenghuangshan Sports Park Gymnasium

=== Gold medal game ===
5 August 2023
11:00 UTC+8

Boxscore

| Japan | 91–99 | China |
Scoring by quarter: 25–28, 19–25, 29–23, 18–23
| Pts: Hayashi 14; Rebs: Tateyama, Ikematsu 4 Asts: Ikematsu 5 | | Pts: Zhang Jingyi 21; Rebs: Li Shuangfei, Han Xu 10; Asts: Han Xu 9 |

Fenghuangshan Sports Park Gymnasium

== Final standings ==
| Place | Team | Record |
|---|---|---|
| 1st place, gold medalist(s) | China | 5–0 |
| 2nd place, silver medalist(s) | Japan | 4–1 |
| 3rd place, bronze medalist(s) | Finland | 4–1 |
| 4 | Chinese Taipei | 3–2 |
| 5 | Hungary | 3–2 |
| 6 | Poland | 2–3 |
| 7 | Czech Republic | 2–3 |
| 8 | Brazil | 1–4 |
| 9 | Portugal | 3–2 |
| 10 | Argentina | 2–3 |
| 11 | Romania | 1–4 |
| 12 | Slovakia | 0–5 |
