= Volleyball at the 2021 Summer World University Games – Women's tournament =

Women's volleyball at the Chengdu 2021 FISU World University Games
- Venue: various
- Dates: 30 July – 6 August
- Teams: 12

The women's volleyball at the 2021 Summer World University Games in Chengdu was played between July 30 and August 6. 12 volleyball teams will participate in the tournament. The indoor volleyball competition was taken place in Guanghua Campus Gymnasium, Xipu Campus Gymnasium, Xihua University Gymnasium and Chengdu University Gymnasium .

== Pool standing procedure ==
1. Number of matches won
2. Match points
3. Sets ratio
4. Points ratio
5. If the tie continues as per the point ratio between two teams, the priority will be given to the team which won the last match between them. When the tie in points ratio is between three or more teams, a new classification of these teams in the terms of points 1, 2 and 3 will be made taking into consideration only the matches in which they were opposed to each other.

Match won 3–0 or 3–1: 3 match points for the winner, 0 match points for the loser
Match won 3–2: 2 match points for the winner, 1 match point for the loser

== Preliminary round ==
- All times are China Standard Time (UTC+08:00)

=== Pool A ===
Pos	Team	Pld	W	L	Pts	SW	SL	SR	SPW	SPL	SPR	Qualification
1	Brazil	2	2	0	5	6	2	3.000	184	164	1.122	Quarterfinals
2	Poland	2	1	1	4	5	4	1.250	197	195	1.010	Quarterfinals
3	Chinese Taipei	2	0	2	0	1	6	0.167	149	166	0.898	9–12th place semifinals

Source: Chengdu 2021

Date	Time		Score		Set 1	Set 2	Set 3	Set 4	Set 5	Total	Report
30 Jul	20:00	Poland	2–3	Brazil	25–21	25–22	23–25	19–25	14–16	106–109	
31 Jul	17:30	Chinese Taipei	1–3	Poland	20–25	25–16	21–25	20–25		86–91	
1 Aug	20:00	Brazil	3–0	Chinese Taipei	25–23	25–20	25–20			75–63	

=== Pool B ===
Pos	Team	Pld	W	L	Pts	SW	SL	SR	SPW	SPL	SPR	Qualification
1	China	2	2	0	6	6	1	6.000	162	131	1.237	Quarterfinals
2	Germany	2	1	1	3	4	3	1.333	136	149	0.913	Quarterfinals
3	Argentina	2	0	2	0	0	6	0.000	127	151	0.841	9–12th place semifinals

Source: Chengdu 2021

Date	Time		Score		Set 1	Set 2	Set 3	Set 4	Set 5	Total	Report
30 Jul	20:00	China	3–1	Germany	11–25	25–11	25–15	25–13		86–64	
31 Jul	20:00	Argentina	0–3	China	22–25	21–25	24–26			67–76	
1 Aug	20:00	Germany	3–0	Argentina	25–22	25–22	25–16			75–60	

=== Pool C ===
Pos	Team	Pld	W	L	Pts	SW	SL	SR	SPW	SPL	SPR	Qualification
1	Italy	2	2	0	6	6	0	MAX	150	70	2.143	Quarterfinals
2	Hong Kong	2	1	1	3	3	3	1.000	116	117	0.991	Quarterfinals
3	India	2	0	2	0	0	6	0.000	71	150	0.473	9–12th place semifinals

Source: Chengdu 2021

Date	Time		Score		Set 1	Set 2	Set 3	Set 4	Set 5	Total	Report
30 Jul	20:00	India	0–3	Hong Kong	13–25	12–25	17–25			42–75	
31 Jul	20:15	Italy	3–0	India	25–12	25–7	25–10			75–29	
1 Aug	20:00	Hong Kong	0–3	Italy	12–25	14–25	15–25			41–75	

=== Pool D ===
Pos	Team	Pld	W	L	Pts	SW	SL	SR	SPW	SPL	SPR	Qualification
1	Japan	2	2	0	6	6	0	MAX	150	77	1.948	Quarterfinals
2	Czech Republic	2	1	1	3	3	3	1.000	127	136	0.934	Quarterfinals
3	Colombia	2	0	2	0	0	6	0.000	86	150	0.573	9–12th place semifinals

Source: Chengdu 2021

Date	Time		Score		Set 1	Set 2	Set 3	Set 4	Set 5	Total	Report
30 Jul	20:00	Colombia	0–3	Czech Republic	19–25	20–25	22–25			61–75	
31 Jul	17:30	Japan	3–0	Colombia	25–9	25–9	25–7			75–25	
1 Aug	20:00	Czech Republic	0–3	Japan	17–25	14–25	21–25			52–75	

== Final round ==
=== 9th–12th places ===
9th–12th semifinals
3 August
Chinese Taipei	3
India	0
3 August
Argentina	3
Colombia	0

9th place match
5 August
Chinese Taipei	3
Argentina	0
11th place match
5 August
India	0
Colombia	3

==== 9–12th place semifinals ====
Date	Time		Score		Set 1	Set 2	Set 3	Set 4	Set 5	Total	Report
3 Aug	20:00	Chinese Taipei	3–0	India	25–9	25–18	25–20			75–47	
3 Aug	17:30	Argentina	3–0	Colombia	25–14	25–11	25–14			75–39	

==== 11th place match ====
Date	Time		Score		Set 1	Set 2	Set 3	Set 4	Set 5	Total	Report
5 Aug	17:30	India	0–3	Colombia	19–25	21–25	17–25			57–75	

==== 9th place match ====
Date	Time		Score		Set 1	Set 2	Set 3	Set 4	Set 5	Total	Report
5 Aug	17:30	Chinese Taipei	3–0	Argentina	25–19	25–21	25–23			75–63	

=== 1st–8th places ===
quarterfinals
3 August
Brazil	3
Hong Kong	0
3 August
Japan	3
Germany	0
3 August
China	3
Czech Republic	0
3 August
Italy	1
Poland	3

semifinals
4 August
Brazil	2
Japan	3
4 August
China	3
Poland	0

Gold Medal match
6 August
Japan	0
China	3
Bronze Medal match
6 August
Brazil	1
Poland	3

5th–8th semifinals
4 August
Hong Kong	0
Germany	3
4 August
Czech Republic	1
Italy	3

5th place match
5 August
Germany	2
Italy	3
7th place match
5 August
Hong Kong	3
Czech Republic	0

==== Quarterfinals ====
Date	Time		Score		Set 1	Set 2	Set 3	Set 4	Set 5	Total	Report
3 Aug	17:30	Brazil	3–0	Hong Kong	25–14	25–20	25–16			75–50	
3 Aug	17:30	Italy	1–3	Poland	22–25	25–27	25–16	16–25		88–93	
3 Aug	20:00	Japan	3–0	Germany	25–21	25–16	25–13			75–50	
3 Aug	20:00	China	3–0	Czech Republic	25–17	25–16	25–16			75–49	

==== 5–8th place semifinals ====
Date	Time		Score		Set 1	Set 2	Set 3	Set 4	Set 5	Total	Report
4 Aug	17:30	Hong Kong	0–3	Germany	14–25	15–25	13–25			42–75	
4 Aug	20:00	Italy	3–1	Czech Republic	24–26	28–26	25–20	25–19		102–91	

==== Semifinals ====
Date	Time		Score		Set 1	Set 2	Set 3	Set 4	Set 5	Total	Report
4 Aug	17:30	Brazil	2–3	Japan	25–27	25–20	25–19	15–25	9–15	99–106	
4 Aug	20:25	Poland	0–3	China	20–25	15–25	15–25			50–75	

==== 7th place match ====
Date	Time		Score		Set 1	Set 2	Set 3	Set 4	Set 5	Total	Report
5 Aug	20:00	Hong Kong	3–0	Czech Republic	26–24	25–20	25–22			76–66	

==== 5th place match ====
Date	Time		Score		Set 1	Set 2	Set 3	Set 4	Set 5	Total	Report
5 Aug	20:00	Germany	2–3	Italy	13–25	25–22	25–23	22–25	12–15	97–110	

==== 3rd place match ====
Date	Time		Score		Set 1	Set 2	Set 3	Set 4	Set 5	Total	Report
6 Aug	17:00	Brazil	1–3	Poland	25–12	23–25	21–25	20–25		89–87	

==== Final ====
Date	Time		Score		Set 1	Set 2	Set 3	Set 4	Set 5	Total	Report
6 Aug	20:00	Japan	0–3	China	27–29	27–29	22–25			76–83	

== Final standing ==
Rank	Team
1st place, gold medalist(s)	China
2nd place, silver medalist(s)	Japan
3rd place, bronze medalist(s)	Poland
4	Brazil
5	Italy
6	Germany
7	Hong Kong
8	Czech Republic
9	Chinese Taipei
10	Argentina
11	Colombia
12	India
