= 2025 Korea Open (badminton) =

Badminton tournament in Korea

Tournament details
- Dates: 23–28 September
- Edition: 32nd
- Level: Super 500
- Total prize money: US$475,000
- Venue: Suwon Gymnasium
- Location: Suwon, South Korea

Champions
- Men's singles: (Indonesia) Jonatan Christie
- Women's singles: (Japan) Akane Yamaguchi
- Men's doubles: (South Korea) Kim Won-ho (South Korea) Seo Seung-jae
- Women's doubles: (South Korea) Kim Hye-jeong (South Korea) Kong Hee-yong
- Mixed doubles: (China) Feng Yanzhe (China) Huang Dongping

The 2025 Korea Open was a badminton tournament which took place at Suwon Gymnasium in Suwon, South Korea, from 23 to 28 September 2025. The tournament had a total prize pool of $475,000.

== Tournament ==
The 2025 Korea Open was the twenty-fifth tournament of the 2025 BWF World Tour and was part of the Korea Open championships, which had been held since 1991. This tournament was organized by the Badminton Korea Association with sanction from the BWF.

=== Venue ===
This tournament was held at Suwon Gymnasium in Suwon, South Korea.

=== Point distribution ===
Below is the point distribution table for each phase of the tournament based on the BWF points system for the BWF World Tour Super 500 event.

Winner	Runner-up	3/4	5/8	9/16	17/32	33/64	65/128
9,200	7,800	6,420	5,040	3,600	2,220	880	430

=== Prize pool ===
The total prize money was US$475,000 with the distribution of the prize money in accordance with BWF regulations.

Event	Winner	Finalist	Semi-finals	Quarter-finals	Last 16
Singles	$35,625	$18,050	$6,887.50	$2,850	$1,662.50
Doubles	$37,525	$18,050	$6,650	$3,443.75	$1,781.25

== Men's singles ==
=== Seeds ===
1. (Denmark) Anders Antonsen (final)
2. (China) Li Shifeng (withdrew)
3. (Chinese Taipei) Chou Tien-chen (semi-finals)
4. (Indonesia) Jonatan Christie (champion)
5. (Singapore) Loh Kean Yew (quarter-finals)
6. (Japan) Kodai Naraoka (quarter-finals)
7. (Japan) Kenta Nishimoto (quarter-finals)
8. (China) Weng Hongyang (quarter-finals)

=== Finals ===
Semi-finals
1	(Denmark) Anders Antonsen	22	21	21
3	(Chinese Taipei) Chou Tien-chen	24	19	10
(Indonesia) Alwi Farhan	21	14	15
4	(Indonesia) Jonatan Christie	18	21	21

Final
1	(Denmark) Anders Antonsen	10	21	17
4	(Indonesia) Jonatan Christie	21	15	21

=== Top half ===
==== Section 1 ====
First round
1	(Denmark) A Antonsen	21	21
Q1	(South Korea) Yoo T-b	10	17
(China) Wang ZX	6	19
(Malaysia) J Hoh	21	21
6	(Japan) K Naraoka	21	22
Q3	(Hong Kong) J Gunawan	15	20
(India) A Shetty	18	18
(Chinese Taipei) Su L-y	21	21

Second round
1	(Denmark) A Antonsen	21	21
(Malaysia) J Hoh	17	11
6	(Japan) K Naraoka	21	21
(Chinese Taipei) Su L-y	10	19

Quarter-finals
1	(Denmark) A Antonsen	w	/	o
6	(Japan) K Naraoka

==== Section 2 ====
First round
3	(Chinese Taipei) Chou T-c	23	21
Q4	(Denmark) M Johannesen	21	14
Q2	(Indonesia) C A Dwi Wardoyo	16
(India) Prannoy H. S.	8^{r}
5	(Singapore) Loh K Y	21	20	21
(India) K George	14	22	14
(Chinese Taipei) Lin C-y	12	17
(Chinese Taipei) Wang T-w	21	21

Second round
3	(Chinese Taipei) Chou T-c	21	21
Q2	(Indonesia) C A Dwi Wardoyo	9	17
5	(Singapore) Loh K Y	21	18	21
(Chinese Taipei) Wang T-w	16	21	17

Quarter-finals
3	(Chinese Taipei) Chou T-c	21	21
5	(Singapore) Loh K Y	18	16

=== Bottom half ===
==== Section 3 ====
First round
(Malaysia) Leong J H	19	24
(Indonesia) A Farhan	21	26
(Hong Kong) Lee C Y	21	21	21
SWM	(China) Lu GZ	23	18	19
(Singapore) J Teh	17	19
(Japan) K Watanabe	21	21
(Republic of Ireland) N Nguyen	16	13
8	(China) Weng HY	21	21

Second round
(Indonesia) A Farhan	w	/	o
(Hong Kong) Lee C Y
(Japan) K Watanabe	16	21	17
8	(China) Weng HY	21	13	21

Quarter-finals
(Indonesia) A Farhan	4	21	21
8	(China) Weng HY	21	16	17

==== Section 4 ====
First round
(Japan) Y Tanaka	17	17
(Indonesia) A S Ginting	21	21
PFQ	(South Korea) Jeon H-j	12	21	15
7	(Japan) K Nishimoto	21	19	21
(Chinese Taipei) Chi Y-j	21	17	18
(Chinese Taipei) Lee C-h	9	21	21
(Hong Kong) Ng K L	11	17
4	(Indonesia) J Christie	21	21

Second round
(Indonesia) A S Ginting	18	19
7	(Japan) K Nishimoto	21	21
(Chinese Taipei) Lee C-h	20	21	15
4	(Indonesia) J Christie	22	15	21

Quarter-finals
7	(Japan) K Nishimoto	14	8
4	(Indonesia) J Christie	21	21

== Women's singles ==
=== Seeds ===
1. (South Korea) An Se-young (final)
2. (Japan) Akane Yamaguchi (champion)
3. (Thailand) Pornpawee Chochuwong (semi-finals)
4. (Indonesia) Putri Kusuma Wardani (semi-finals)
5. (Japan) Tomoka Miyazaki (quarter-finals)
6. (Thailand) Supanida Katethong (quarter-finals)
7. (South Korea) Sim Yu-jin (withdrew)
8. (China) Gao Fangjie (second round)

=== Finals ===
Semi-finals
1	(South Korea) An Se-young	21	8
3	(Thailand) Pornpawee Chochuwong	19	0^{r}
4	(Indonesia) Putri Kusuma Wardani	9	14
2	(Japan) Akane Yamaguchi	21	21

Final
1	(South Korea) An Se-young	18	13
2	(Japan) Akane Yamaguchi	21	21

=== Top half ===
==== Section 1 ====
First round
1	(South Korea) An S-y	21	21
(Malaysia) Letshanaa K	14	9
(Chinese Taipei) Chiu P-c	21	21
(Hong Kong) Lo S Y	13	12
5	(Japan) T Miyazaki	21	21
Q2	(South Korea) Kim S-m	13	10
(Thailand) P Opatniputh	17	19
(Japan) N Nidaira	21	21

Second round
1	(South Korea) An S-y	21	21
(Chinese Taipei) Chiu P-c	13	8
5	(Japan) T Miyazaki	21	21
(Japan) N Nidaira	10	18

Quarter-finals
1	(South Korea) An S-y	21	21
5	(Japan) T Miyazaki	7	17

==== Section 2 ====
First round
3	(Thailand) P Chochuwong	21	21
(China) Han QX	14	11
Q3	(South Korea) Kim J-e	21	20	21
(Japan) K Sugiyama	19	22	11
SWM	(Singapore) Yeo J M	21	22
(Thailand) P Choeikeewong	10	20
(Chinese Taipei) Chen S-y	w	/	o
Q4

Second round
3	(Thailand) P Chochuwong	21	21
Q3	(South Korea) Kim J-e	14	17
SWM	(Singapore) Yeo J M	18	21	24
(Chinese Taipei) Chen S-y	21	13	22

Quarter-finals
3	(Thailand) P Chochuwong	24	18
SWM	(Singapore) Yeo J M	22	12^{r}

=== Bottom half ===
==== Section 3 ====
First round
(South Korea) Kim G-e	21	21
(Malaysia) Goh J W	7	15
(Chinese Taipei) Hung Y-t	9	11
8	(China) Gao FJ	21	21
(Chinese Taipei) Pai Y-p	18	21	21
PFQ	(Czech Republic) T Švábíková	21	10	10
(India) A Upadhyaya	16	15
4	(Indonesia) P K Wardani	21	21

Second round
(South Korea) Kim G-e	21	12	21
8	(China) Gao FJ	14	21	19
(Chinese Taipei) Pai Y-p	14	15
4	(Indonesia) P K Wardani	21	21

Quarter-finals
(South Korea) Kim G-e	6	15
4	(Indonesia) P K Wardani	21	21

==== Section 4 ====
First round
(Chinese Taipei) Lin H-t	17	18
Q1	(South Korea) Park G-e	21	21
(Ukraine) P Buhrova	19	16
6	(Thailand) S Katethong	21	21
(Hong Kong) S S Mehta	21	6	14
(Chinese Taipei) Tung C-t	15	21	21
(Chinese Taipei) Sung S-y	11	15
2	(Japan) A Yamaguchi	21	21

Second round
Q1	(South Korea) Park G-e	6	12
6	(Thailand) S Katethong	21	21
(Chinese Taipei) Tung C-t	14	14
2	(Japan) A Yamaguchi	21	21

Quarter-finals
6	(Thailand) S Katethong	21	10	15
2	(Japan) A Yamaguchi	16	21	21

== Men's doubles ==
=== Seeds ===
1. (South Korea) Kim Won-ho / Seo Seung-jae (champions)
2. (China) Liang Weikeng / Wang Chang (first round)
3. (China) Chen Boyang / Liu Yi (first round)
4. (Japan) Takuro Hoki / Yugo Kobayashi (semi-finals)
5. (Chinese Taipei) Lee Jhe-huei / Yang Po-hsuan (semi-finals)
6. (South Korea) Kang Min-hyuk / Ki Dong-ju (first round)
7. (China) Huang Di / Liu Yang (first round)
8. (Indonesia) Leo Rolly Carnando / Bagas Maulana (first round)

=== Finals ===
Semi-finals
1	(South Korea) Kim Won-ho (South Korea) Seo Seung-jae	21	21
4	(Japan) Takuro Hoki (Japan) Yugo Kobayashi	16	12
5	(Chinese Taipei) Lee Jhe-huei (Chinese Taipei) Yang Po-hsuan	19	16
(Indonesia) Fajar Alfian (Indonesia) Muhammad Shohibul Fikri	21	21

Final
1	(South Korea) Kim Won-ho (South Korea) Seo Seung-jae	21	23
(Indonesia) Fajar Alfian (Indonesia) Muhammad Shohibul Fikri	16	21

=== Top half ===
==== Section 1 ====
First round
1	(South Korea) Kim W-h (South Korea) Seo S-j	21	21
(South Korea) Choi S-g (Malaysia) Goh V S	15	14
(Japan) H Midorikawa (Japan) K Yamashita	2
(Malaysia) Low H Y (Malaysia) Ng E C	2^{r}
6	(South Korea) Kang M-h (South Korea) Ki D-j	22	21	19
PFQ	(China) Sun WJ (China) Zeng WH	24	14	21
(China) Ren XY (China) Xie HN	21	21
(Chinese Taipei) Liu K-h (Chinese Taipei) Yang P-ha	8	19

Second round
1	(South Korea) Kim W-h (South Korea) Seo S-j	22	21
(Japan) H Midorikawa (Japan) K Yamashita	20	15
PFQ	(China) Sun WJ (China) Zeng WH	21	13	10
(China) Ren XY (China) Xie HN	14	21	21

Quarter-finals
1	(South Korea) Kim W-h (South Korea) Seo S-j	24	21
(China) Ren XY (China) Xie HN	22	11

==== Section 2 ====
First round
4	(Japan) T Hoki (Japan) Y Kobayashi	21	21
(Indonesia) M R Ardianto (Indonesia) Y Rambitan	19	15
(Malaysia) Choong H J (Malaysia) M Haikal	21	21
(Thailand) P Sukphun (Thailand) P Teeraratsakul	19	12
8	(Indonesia) L R Carnando (Indonesia) B Maulana	18	21	22
Q1	(South Korea) Lee J-m (South Korea) Wang C	21	17	24
Q4	(South Korea) Kim J-h (South Korea) Lee S-w	21	19	21
(United States) Chen Z-y (United States) P Smith	19	21	14

Second round
4	(Japan) T Hoki (Japan) Y Kobayashi	21	21
(Malaysia) Choong H J (Malaysia) M Haikal	17	11
Q1	(South Korea) Lee J-m (South Korea) Wang C	21	21
Q4	(South Korea) Kim J-h (South Korea) Lee S-w	13	15

Quarter-finals
4	(Japan) T Hoki (Japan) Y Kobayashi	21	21
Q1	(South Korea) Lee J-m (South Korea) Wang C	17	19

=== Bottom half ===
==== Section 3 ====
First round
(Japan) T Nomura (Japan) Y Shimogami	10	11
(Chinese Taipei) Chiu H-c (Chinese Taipei) Wang C-l	21	21
(Chinese Taipei) Lee F-c (Chinese Taipei) Lee F-j	18	10
5	(Chinese Taipei) Lee J-h (Chinese Taipei) Yang P-hs	21	21
(Chinese Taipei) Chen C-k (Chinese Taipei) Lin B-w	21	21
Q2	(Czech Republic) J Král (Czech Republic) O Král	18	17
Q3	(South Korea) Cho S-h (South Korea) Jin S-i	21	21
3	(China) Chen BY (China) Liu Yi	13	18

Second round
(Chinese Taipei) Chiu H-c (Chinese Taipei) Wang C-l	15	16
5	(Chinese Taipei) Lee J-h (Chinese Taipei) Yang P-hs	21	21
(Chinese Taipei) Chen C-k (Chinese Taipei) Lin B-w	17	12
Q3	(South Korea) Cho S-h (South Korea) Jin S-i	21	21

Quarter-finals
5	(Chinese Taipei) Lee J-h (Chinese Taipei) Yang P-hs	21	21
Q3	(South Korea) Cho S-h (South Korea) Jin S-i	15	18

==== Section 4 ====
First round
(South Korea) Jin Y (South Korea) Na S-s	21	21
(Malaysia) J Arif (Malaysia) Yap R K	18	16
(South Korea) Kim G-j (South Korea) Kim S-r	24	21
7	(China) Huang D (China) Liu Ya	22	19
(Malaysia) N M Azriyn A (Malaysia) Tan W K	18	12
(Indonesia) F Alfian (Indonesia) M S Fikri	21	21
(Japan) K Mitsuhashi (Japan) H Okamura	18	21	21
2	(China) Liang WK (China) Wang C	21	18	18

Second round
(South Korea) Jin Y (South Korea) Na S-s	21	21
(South Korea) Kim G-j (South Korea) Kim S-r	17	14
(Indonesia) F Alfian (Indonesia) M S Fikri	21	21
(Japan) K Mitsuhashi (Japan) H Okamura	19	9

Quarter-finals
(South Korea) Jin Y (South Korea) Na S-s	13	16
(Indonesia) F Alfian (Indonesia) M S Fikri	21	21

== Women's doubles ==
=== Seeds ===
1. (Japan) Rin Iwanaga / Kie Nakanishi (final)
2. (South Korea) Kim Hye-jeong / Kong Hee-yong (champions)
3. (South Korea) Baek Ha-na / Lee So-hee (semi-finals)
4. (Japan) Yuki Fukushima / Mayu Matsumoto (semi-finals)
5. (China) Chen Qingchen / Jia Yifan (quarter-finals)
6. (China) Li Yijing / Luo Xumin (withdrew)
7. (Chinese Taipei) Hsieh Pei-shan / Hung En-tzu (quarter-finals)
8. (Hong Kong) Yeung Nga Ting / Yeung Pui Lam (second round)

=== Finals ===
Semi-finals
1	(Japan) Rin Iwanaga (Japan) Kie Nakanishi	21	14	21
4	(Japan) Yuki Fukushima (Japan) Mayu Matsumoto	18	21	16
3	(South Korea) Baek Ha-na (South Korea) Lee So-hee	19	21	14
2	(South Korea) Kim Hye-jeong (South Korea) Kong Hee-yong	21	19	21

Final
1	(Japan) Rin Iwanaga (Japan) Kie Nakanishi	19	12
2	(South Korea) Kim Hye-jeong (South Korea) Kong Hee-yong	21	21

=== Top half ===
==== Section 1 ====
First round
(Japan) A Igarashi (Japan) C Shida	21	20	21
(Hong Kong) Fan K Y (Hong Kong) Yau M Y	9	22	8
(United States) F Corbett (United States) J Gai	21	17
(Chinese Taipei) Sung S-y (Chinese Taipei) Yu C-h	23	21

Second round
1	(Japan) R Iwanaga (Japan) K Nakanishi	21	21
(Japan) A Igarashi (Japan) C Shida	19	17
SWM	(Chinese Taipei) Chang C-h (Chinese Taipei) Yang C-t	21	17	21
(Chinese Taipei) Sung S-y (Chinese Taipei) Yu C-h	19	21	17

Quarter-finals
1	(Japan) R Iwanaga (Japan) K Nakanishi	21	21
SWM	(Chinese Taipei) Chang C-h (Chinese Taipei) Yang C-t	13	18

==== Section 2 ====
First round
(Ukraine) P Buhrova (Ukraine) Y Kantemyr	15	13
(South Korea) Jang E-s (South Korea) Kim S-y	21	21
5	(China) Chen QC (China) Jia YF	21	24
(Chinese Taipei) Hsu Y-c (Chinese Taipei) Sung Y-h	16	22
(Chinese Taipei) Hsu Y-h (Chinese Taipei) Lin J-y	21	21
(Malaysia) Go P K (Malaysia) Teoh M X	13	11

Second round
4	(Japan) Y Fukushima (Japan) M Matsumoto	21	26
(South Korea) Jang E-s (South Korea) Kim S-y	17	24
5	(China) Chen QC (China) Jia YF	16	21	21
(Chinese Taipei) Hsu Y-h (Chinese Taipei) Lin J-y	21	16	18

Quarter-finals
4	(Japan) Y Fukushima (Japan) M Matsumoto	21	21
5	(China) Chen QC (China) Jia YF	19	13

=== Bottom half ===
==== Section 3 ====
First round
(South Korea) Jeong N-e (South Korea) Lee Y-w	18	21	13
7	(Chinese Taipei) Hsieh P-s (Chinese Taipei) Hung E-t	21	19	21
(Hong Kong) Lui L L (Hong Kong) Tsang H Y	18	6
(Indonesia) A Rahayu (Indonesia) S F S Ramadhanti	21	21

Second round
(Chinese Taipei) Chen S-y (Chinese Taipei) Hsieh Y-e	9	21	19
7	(Chinese Taipei) Hsieh P-s (Chinese Taipei) Hung E-t	21	16	21
(Indonesia) A Rahayu (Indonesia) S F S Ramadhanti	12	16
3	(South Korea) Baek H-n (South Korea) Lee S-h	21	21

Quarter-finals
7	(Chinese Taipei) Hsieh P-s (Chinese Taipei) Hung E-t	17	17
3	(South Korea) Baek H-n (South Korea) Lee S-h	21	21

==== Section 4 ====
First round
(Japan) R Hirokami (Japan) S Hobara	23	21
(Japan) N Hara (Japan) R Kiyose	21	14
(South Korea) Kim M-j (South Korea) Lee Y-n	10	21	20
(Chinese Taipei) Hu L-f (Chinese Taipei) Jheng Y-c	21	18	22

Second round
(Japan) R Hirokami (Japan) S Hobara	21	21
8	(Hong Kong) Yeung N T (Hong Kong) Yeung P L	14	16
(Chinese Taipei) Hu L-f (Chinese Taipei) Jheng Y-c	17	13
2	(South Korea) Kim H-j (South Korea) Kong H-y	21	21

Quarter-finals
(Japan) R Hirokami (Japan) S Hobara	16	21	19
2	(South Korea) Kim H-j (South Korea) Kong H-y	21	15	21

== Mixed doubles ==
=== Seeds ===
1. (China) Feng Yanzhe / Huang Dongping (champions)
2. (China) Jiang Zhenbang / Wei Yaxin (final)
3. (Malaysia) Chen Tang Jie / Toh Ee Wei (withdrew)
4. (China) Guo Xinwa / Chen Fanghui (quarter-finals)
5. (Malaysia) Goh Soon Huat / Shevon Jemie Lai (quarter-finals)
6. (Japan) Hiroki Midorikawa / Natsu Saito (second round)
7. (China) Cheng Xing / Zhang Chi (quarter-finals)
8. (Indonesia) Jafar Hidayatullah / Felisha Pasaribu (second round)

=== Finals ===
Semi-finals
1	(China) Feng Yanzhe (China) Huang Dongping	22	21
(Indonesia) Amri Syahnawi (Indonesia) Nita Violina Marwah	20	12
Q1	(Denmark) Mathias Christiansen (Denmark) Alexandra Bøje	19	18
2	(China) Jiang Zhenbang (China) Wei Yaxin	21	21

Final
1	(China) Feng Yanzhe (China) Huang Dongping	25	21
2	(China) Jiang Zhenbang (China) Wei Yaxin	23	11

=== Top half ===
==== Section 1 ====
First round
1	(China) Feng YZ (China) Huang DP	21	21
(Thailand) P Teeraratsakul (Thailand) S Taerattanachai	12	11
(Japan) Y Shimogami (Japan) S Hobara	21	21
(India) M Jaglan (India) L Jaglan	7	14
7	(China) Cheng X (China) Zhang C	21	21
(United States) P Smith (United States) J Gai	17	13
(Chinese Taipei) Ye H-w (Chinese Taipei) N G Chan	21	13	10
(South Korea) Wang C (South Korea) Kim Y-j	19	21	21

Second round
1	(China) Feng YZ (China) Huang DP	22	21
(Japan) Y Shimogami (Japan) S Hobara	20	9
7	(China) Cheng X (China) Zhang C	21	21
(South Korea) Wang C (South Korea) Kim Y-j	19	13

Quarter-finals
1	(China) Feng YZ (China) Huang DP	21	21
7	(China) Cheng X (China) Zhang C	16	9

==== Section 2 ====
First round
4	(China) Guo XW (China) Chen FH	21	21
(Chinese Taipei) Chen C-k (Chinese Taipei) Hsu Y-h	9	12
(Malaysia) Hoo P R (Malaysia) Cheng S Y	23	17	19
(Thailand) R Oupthong (Thailand) J Sudjaipraparat	21	21	21
6	(Japan) H Midorikawa (Japan) N Saito	21	21
Q4	(Germany) C Devereux (Germany) D Toepffer	4	7
(Indonesia) A Syahnawi (Indonesia) N V Marwah	21	21
(United States) Chen Z-y (United States) F Corbett	7	9

Second round
4	(China) Guo XW (China) Chen FH	21	21
(Thailand) R Oupthong (Thailand) J Sudjaipraparat	14	17
6	(Japan) H Midorikawa (Japan) N Saito	19	14
(Indonesia) A Syahnawi (Indonesia) N V Marwah	21	21

Quarter-finals
4	(China) Guo XW (China) Chen FH	21	17	16
(Indonesia) A Syahnawi (Indonesia) N V Marwah	11	21	21

=== Bottom half ===
==== Section 3 ====
First round
(Malaysia) Wong T C (Malaysia) Lim C S	21	22
(Chinese Taipei) Liu K-h (Chinese Taipei) Jheng Y-c	13	20
(South Korea) Lee J-m (South Korea) Chae Y-j	21	21
SWM	(Chinese Taipei) Yang P-hs (Chinese Taipei) Hu L-f	16	9
Q1	(Denmark) M Christiansen (Denmark) A Bøje	21	22
(South Korea) Lee S-w (South Korea) Kim M-j	13	20
(Macau) Leong I C (Macau) Ng W C	15	8
8	(Indonesia) J Hidayatullah (Indonesia) F Pasaribu	21	21

Second round
(Malaysia) Wong T C (Malaysia) Lim C S	9	21	21
(South Korea) Lee J-m (South Korea) Chae Y-j	21	15	17
Q1	(Denmark) M Christiansen (Denmark) A Bøje	22	21	21
8	(Indonesia) J Hidayatullah (Indonesia) F Pasaribu	24	19	14

Quarter-finals
(Malaysia) Wong T C (Malaysia) Lim C S	12	8
Q1	(Denmark) M Christiansen (Denmark) A Bøje	21	21

==== Section 4 ====
First round
PFQ	(Czech Republic) O Král (Czech Republic) T Švábíková	14	12
(China) Gao JX (China) Wu MY	21	21
(Indonesia) A Maulana (Indonesia) I C S Jamil	9	20
5	(Malaysia) Goh S H (Malaysia) S J Lai	21	22
(Japan) Y Watanabe (Japan) M Taguchi	21	21
Q3	(Chinese Taipei) Lin B-w (Chinese Taipei) Lin J-y	14	8
Q2	(South Korea) Park S-m (South Korea) Lee Y-n	7	9
2	(China) Jiang ZB (China) Wei YX	21	21

Second round
(China) Gao JX (China) Wu MY	16	13
5	(Malaysia) Goh S H (Malaysia) S J Lai	21	21
(Japan) Y Watanabe (Japan) M Taguchi	14	15
2	(China) Jiang ZB (China) Wei YX	21	21

Quarter-finals
5	(Malaysia) Goh S H (Malaysia) S J Lai	9	21	8
2	(China) Jiang ZB (China) Wei YX	21	18	21

Preceded by 2025 China Masters; 2025 Indonesia Masters Super 100 I	BWF World Tour; 2025 BWF season	Succeeded by 2025 Al Ain Masters
