= Badminton at the 2021 Summer World University Games – Mixed team =

Mixed team at the 2021 Summer World University Games
- Venue: Shuangliu Sports Centre Gymnasium
- Location: Chengdu, China
- Dates: 30 July–2 August 2023
- Competitors: 159 from 17 nations

Medalists
| gold medal | Chinese Taipei (TPE) |
| silver medal | China (CHN) |
| bronze medal | Malaysia (MAS) |
| bronze medal | Thailand (THA) |

The mixed team badminton event at the 2021 Summer World University Games was held from July 30 to August 2 at the Shuangliu Sports Centre Gymnasium in Chengdu, China.

The champions of the last mixed team event, Chinese Taipei retained their title as champions of the mixed team event after beating hosts China 3−2 in the final.

== Group composition ==
| Group A | Group B | Group C | Group D |
|---|---|---|---|
| Brazil; China; France; Thailand | Malaysia; Poland; Singapore; United States | India; Japan; South Korea; Switzerland; Ukraine | Chinese Taipei; Estonia; Germany; Hong Kong |

== Group A ==
| Pos | Team | Pld | W | L | MF | MA | MD | GF | GA | GD | PF | PA | PD | Pts | Qualification | People's Republic of China | Thailand | France | Brazil |
|---|---|---|---|---|---|---|---|---|---|---|---|---|---|---|---|---|---|---|---|
| 1 | China (H) | 3 | 3 | 0 | 14 | 1 | +13 | 13 | 25 | −12 | 636 | 398 | +238 | 3 | Advance to quarter-finals | — | 4–1 | 5–0 | 5–0 |
| 2 | Thailand | 3 | 2 | 1 | 9 | 6 | +3 | 3 | 6 | −3 | 633 | 534 | +99 | 2 | Advance to quarter-finals | | — | 3–2 | 5–0 |
| 3 | France | 3 | 1 | 2 | 7 | 8 | −1 | 1 | -1 | +2 | 577 | 573 | +4 | 1 | Advance to 9th to 13th place classification round | | | — | 5–0 |
| 4 | Brazil | 3 | 0 | 3 | 16 | 15 | +1 | -15 | -30 | +15 | 289 | 630 | −341 | 0 | Advance to 9th to 13th place classification round | | | | — |

Source: results.chengdu2021.com
(H) Host

=== Thailand vs Brazil ===
Thailand
5
Shuangliu Sports Centre Gymnasium Court 3
30 July 2023, 09:00 UTC+8

Brazil
0

| | | | 1 | 2 | 3 |
|---|---|---|---|---|---|
| 1 | (Thailand) (Brazil) | Ruttanapak Oupthong / Jhenicha Sudjaipraparat; Pedro Taveira / Juliana Viana Vieira | 21; 9 | 21; 9 |
| 2 | (Thailand) (Brazil) | Panitchaphon Teeraratsakul; Welton Menezes | 21; 12 | 21; 16 |
| 3 | (Thailand) (Brazil) | Lalinrat Chaiwan; Sayane Lima | 21; 8 | 21; 6 |
| 4 | (Thailand) (Brazil) | Peeratchai Sukphun / Pakkapon Teeraratsakul; Welton Menezes / Pedro Taveira | 21; 13 | 21; 8 |
| 5 | (Thailand) (Brazil) | Chasinee Korepap / Nannapas Sukklad; Sayane Lima / Juliana Viana Vieira | 21; 10 | 21; 3 |

=== China vs France ===
China
5
Shuangliu Sports Centre Gymnasium Court 1
30 July 2023, 09:00 UTC+8

France
0

| | | | 1 | 2 | 3 |
|---|---|---|---|---|---|
| 1 | (China) (France) | Ren Xiangyu / Tan Qiang; Eloi Adam / Leo Rossi | 21; 15 | 21; 18 |
| 2 | (China) (France) | Li Wenmei / Xia Yuting; Sharone Bauer / Flavie Vallet | 21; 7 | 21; 14 |
| 3 | (China) (France) | Wang Zhengxing; Enogat Roy | 21; 18 | 21; 14 |
| 4 | (China) (France) | Zhang Yiman; Romane Cloteaux-Foucault | 21; 15 | 21; 13 |
| 5 | (China) (France) | He Jiting / Du Yue; Eloi Adam / Sharone Bauer | 21; 16 | 21; 13 |

=== Thailand vs France ===
Thailand
3
Shuangliu Sports Centre Gymnasium Court 4
30 July 2023, 17:00 UTC+8

France
2

| | | | 1 | 2 | 3 |
|---|---|---|---|---|---|
| 1 | (Thailand) (France) | Ruttanapak Oupthong / Jhenicha Sudjaipraparat; Leo Rossi / Flavie Vallet | 21; 11 | 15; 21 | 18; 21 |
| 2 | (Thailand) (France) | Panitchaphon Teeraratsakul; Roy Enogat | 21; 18 | 19; 21 | 21; 16 |
| 3 | (Thailand) (France) | Lalinrat Chaiwan; Romane Cloteaux-Foucault | 21; 15 | 21; 11 |
| 4 | (Thailand) (France) | Peeratchai Sukphun / Pakkapon Teeraratsakul; Eloi Adam / Leo Rossi | 18; 21 | 21; 23 |
| 5 | (Thailand) (France) | Chasinee Korepap / Nannapas Sukklad; Sharone Bauer / Flavie Vallet | 21; 13 | 18; 21 | 21; 12 |

=== China vs Brazil ===
China
5
Shuangliu Sports Centre Gymnasium Court 2
30 July 2023, 17:00 UTC+8

Brazil
0

| | | | 1 | 2 | 3 |
|---|---|---|---|---|---|
| 1 | (China) (Brazil) | Ren Xiangyu / Li Wenmei; Pedro Taveira / Juliana Viana Vieira | 21; 9 | 21; 9 |
| 2 | (China) (Brazil) | Dong Tianyao; Welton Menezes | 21; 18 | 21; 15 |
| 3 | (China) (Brazil) | Han Yue; Sayane Lima | 21; 7 | 21; 6 |
| 4 | (China) (Brazil) | Tan Qiang / Zhou Haodong; Welton Menezes / Pedro Taveira | 21; 6 | 21; 7 |
| 5 | (China) (Brazil) | Du Yue / Xia Yuting; Sayane Lima / Juliana Viana Vieira | 21; 9 | 21; 11 |

=== Thailand vs China ===
Thailand
1
Shuangliu Sports Centre Gymnasium Court 1
31 July 2023, 09:00 UTC+8

China
4

| | | | 1 | 2 | 3 |
|---|---|---|---|---|---|
| 1 | (Thailand) (China) | Ratchapol Makkasasithorn / Chasinee Korepap; He Jiting / Du Yue | 17; 21 | 16; 21 |
| 2 | (Thailand) (China) | Saran Jamsri; Wang Zhengxing | 21; 16 | 21; 19 |
| 3 | (Thailand) (China) | Pornpicha Choeikeewong; Zhang Yiman | 15; 21 | 15; 21 |
| 4 | (Thailand) (China) | Peeratchai Sukphun / Pakkapon Teeraratsakul; Ren Xiangyu / Tan Qiang | 6; 21 | 10; 21 |
| 5 | (Thailand) (China) | Jhenicha Sudjaipraparat / Nannapas Sukklad; Li Wenmei / Xia Yuting | 16; 21 | 21; 13 | 9; 21 |

=== France vs Brazil ===
France
5
Shuangliu Sports Centre Gymnasium Court 5
31 July 2023, 09:00 UTC+8

Brazil
0

| | | | 1 | 2 | 3 |
|---|---|---|---|---|---|
| 1 | (France) (Brazil) | Eloi Adam / Sharone Bauer; Welton Menezes / Sayane Lima | 21; 14 | 21; 18 |
| 2 | (France) (Brazil) | Grégoire Deschamp; Pedro Taveira | 21; 9 | 21; 5 |
| 3 | (France) (Brazil) | Romane Cloteaux-Foucault; Juliana Viana Vieira | 21; 7 | 21; 17 |
| 4 | (France) (Brazil) | Eloi Adam / Leo Rossi; Welton Menezes / Pedro Taveira | 21; 11 | 21; 8 |
| 5 | (France) (Brazil) | Sharone Bauer / Flavie Vallet; Sayane Lima / Juliana Viana Vieira | 21; 6 | 21; 12 |

== Group B ==
| Pos | Team | Pld | W | L | MF | MA | MD | GF | GA | GD | PF | PA | PD | Pts | Qualification | Malaysia | United States | Poland | Singapore |
|---|---|---|---|---|---|---|---|---|---|---|---|---|---|---|---|---|---|---|---|
| 1 | Malaysia | 3 | 3 | 0 | 14 | 1 | +13 | 13 | 23 | −10 | 659 | 506 | +153 | 3 | Advance to quarter-finals | — | 4–1 | 5–0 | 5–0 |
| 2 | United States | 3 | 2 | 1 | 9 | 6 | +3 | 3 | 5 | −2 | 674 | 662 | +12 | 2 | Advance to quarter-finals | | — | 4–1 | 4–1 |
| 3 | Poland | 3 | 1 | 2 | 5 | 10 | −5 | 5 | -10 | +15 | 632 | 697 | −65 | 1 | Advance to 9th to 13th place classification round | | | — | 4–1 |
| 4 | Singapore | 3 | 0 | 3 | 2 | 13 | −11 | -11 | -18 | +7 | 531 | 631 | −100 | 0 | Advance to 9th to 13th place classification round | | | | — |

Source: results.chengdu2021.com

=== Malaysia vs Singapore ===
Malaysia
5
Shuangliu Sports Centre Gymnasium Court 6
30 July 2023, 09:00 UTC+8

Singapore
0

| | | | 1 | 2 | 3 |
|---|---|---|---|---|---|
| 1 | (Malaysia) (Singapore) | Tan Kok Xian / Wong Tien Ci; Cheong Kai Jun / Ng Wee Lim | 21; 18 | 21; 14 |
| 2 | (Malaysia) (Singapore) | Ng Qi Xuan / Teoh Le Xuan; Ashley Lim / Lim Su Qi | 21; 10 | 21; 9 |
| 3 | (Malaysia) (Singapore) | Faiz Rozain; Lim Zhi Hong | 21; 11 | 21; 17 |
| 4 | (Malaysia) (Singapore) | Kisona Selvaduray; Joanna Wu | 21; 7 | 21; 13 |
| 5 | (Malaysia) (Singapore) | Wong Tien Ci / Desiree Siow; Li Zhengxi / Melissa Chua | 21; 7 | 21; 9 |

=== Poland vs United States ===
Poland
1
Shuangliu Sports Centre Gymnasium Court 7
30 July 2023, 09:00 UTC+8

United States
4

| | | | 1 | 2 | 3 |
|---|---|---|---|---|---|
| 1 | (Poland) (United States) | Robert Cybulski / Kornelia Marczak; Adrian Mar / Esther Shi | 21; 19 | 16; 21 | 18; 21 |
| 2 | (Poland) (United States) | Mikołaj Szymanowski; Enrico Asuncion | 20; 22 | 21; 10 | 21; 19 |
| 3 | (Poland) (United States) | Anastasiya Khomich; Natalie Chi | 19; 21 | 17; 21 |
| 4 | (Poland) (United States) | Robert Cybulski / Mikołaj Szymanowski; Daniel Bielin / Andre Chim | 21; 17 | 17; 21 | 19; 21 |
| 5 | (Poland) (United States) | Paulina Hankiewicz / Anastasiya Khomich; Katelin Ngo / Kalea Sheung | 13; 21 | 16; 21 |

=== Malaysia vs United States ===
Malaysia
4
Shuangliu Sports Centre Gymnasium Court 5
30 July 2023, 17:00 UTC+8

United States
1

| | | | 1 | 2 | 3 |
|---|---|---|---|---|---|---|
| 1 | (Malaysia) (United States) | Faris Zaim Abdul Khalid / Gan Jing Err; Nicholas Chiu / Nicole Ju | 21; 14 | 18; 21 | 21; 17 |
| 2 | (Malaysia) (United States) | Faiz Rozain; Victor Lai | 21; 14 | 21; 14 |
| 3 | (Malaysia) (United States) | Kisona Selvaduray; Esther Shi | 14; 18 | | | retired |
| 4 | (Malaysia) (United States) | Tan Kok Xian / Wong Tien Ci; Andre Chim / Adrian Mar | 21; 14 | 15; 21 | 21; 18 |
| 5 | (Malaysia) (United States) | Desiree Siow / Yap Rui Chen; Katelin Ngo / Kalea Sheung | 22; 20 | 21; 18 |

=== Poland vs Singapore ===
Poland
4
Shuangliu Sports Centre Gymnasium Court 3
30 July 2023, 17:00 UTC+8

Singapore
1

| | | | 1 | 2 | 3 |
|---|---|---|---|---|---|
| 1 | (Poland) (Singapore) | Robert Cybulski / Kornelia Marczak; Ng Wee Lim / Lim Su Qi | 12; 21 | 22; 20 | 21; 13 |
| 2 | (Poland) (Singapore) | Mikołaj Szymanowski; Timothy Phang | 17; 21 | 21; 19 | 21; 9 |
| 3 | (Poland) (Singapore) | Anastasiya Khomich; Grace Chua | 5; 21 | 12; 21 |
| 4 | (Poland) (Singapore) | Robert Cybulski / Mikołaj Szymanowski; Neaton Ang / Li Zhengxi | 21; 16 | 21; 19 |
| 5 | (Poland) (Singapore) | Paulina Hankiewicz / Anastasiya Khomich; Melissa Chua / Tan Zhi Yi | 21; 14 | 21; 15 |

=== Malaysia vs Poland ===
Malaysia
5
Shuangliu Sports Centre Gymnasium Court 2
31 July 2023, 09:00 UTC+8

Poland
0

| | | | 1 | 2 | 3 |
|---|---|---|---|---|---|
| 1 | (Malaysia) (Poland) | Wong Tien Ci / Desiree Siow; He Jiting / Du Yue | 21; 19 | 21; 17 |
| 2 | (Malaysia) (Poland) | Anson Cheong; Łukasz Cimosz | 21; 12 | 25; 23 |
| 3 | (Malaysia) (Poland) | Yap Rui Chen; Anastasiya Khomich | 21; 17 | 19; 21 | 21; 14 |
| 4 | (Malaysia) (Poland) | Tan Kok Xian / Wong Tien Ci; Robert Cybulski / Mikołaj Szymanowski | 21; 17 | 21; 15 |
| 5 | (Malaysia) (Poland) | Ng Qi Xuan / Teoh Le Xuan; Paulina Hankiewicz / Anastasiya Khomich | 21; 8 | 21; 15 |

=== United States vs Singapore ===
United States
4
Shuangliu Sports Centre Gymnasium Court 3
31 July 2023, 09:00 UTC+8

Singapore
1

| | | | 1 | 2 | 3 |
|---|---|---|---|---|---|---|
| 1 | (United States) (Singapore) | Adrian Mar / Esther Shi; Ng Wee Lim / Lim Su Qi | 21; 15 | 21; 13 |
| 2 | (United States) (Singapore) | Enrico Asuncion; Timothy Phang | 19; 21 | 21; 18 | 21; 15 |
| 3 | (United States) (Singapore) | Esther Shi; Grace Chua | 1; 21 | | | retired |
| 4 | (United States) (Singapore) | Andre Chim / Adrian Mar; Neaton Ang / Li Zhengxi | 21; 17 | 18; 21 | 21; 15 |
| 5 | (United States) (Singapore) | Katelin Ngo / Kalea Sheung; Grace Chua / Melissa Chua | 21; 14 | 21; 16 |

== Group C ==
| Pos | Team | Pld | W | L | MF | MA | MD | GF | GA | GD | PF | PA | PD | Pts | Qualification | South Korea | Japan | India | Switzerland | Ukraine |
|---|---|---|---|---|---|---|---|---|---|---|---|---|---|---|---|---|---|---|---|---|
| 1 | South Korea | 4 | 4 | 0 | 19 | 1 | +18 | 18 | 33 | −15 | 898 | 632 | +266 | 4 | Advance to quarter-finals | — | 5–0 | 4–1 | 5–0 | 5–0 |
| 2 | Japan | 4 | 3 | 1 | 13 | 7 | +6 | 6 | 13 | −7 | 836 | 711 | +125 | 3 | Advance to quarter-finals | | — | 4–1 | 4–1 | 5–0 |
| 3 | India | 4 | 2 | 2 | 12 | 8 | +4 | 4 | 7 | −3 | 797 | 741 | +56 | 2 | Advance to 9th to 13th place classification round | | | — | 5–0 | 5–0 |
| 4 | Switzerland | 4 | 1 | 3 | 5 | 15 | −10 | -10 | -16 | +6 | 730 | 856 | −126 | 1 | Advance to 9th to 13th place classification round | | | | — | 4–1 |
| 5 | Ukraine | 4 | 0 | 4 | 1 | 19 | −18 | -18 | -37 | +19 | 538 | 859 | −321 | 0 | 17th place | | | | | — |

Source: results.chengdu2021.com

=== South Korea vs Ukraine ===
South Korea
5
Shuangliu Sports Centre Gymnasium Court 8
30 July 2023, 09:00 UTC+8

Ukraine
0

| | | | 1 | 2 | 3 |
|---|---|---|---|---|---|
| 1 | (South Korea) (Ukraine) | Kim Young-hyuk / Lee Jung-hyun; Volodymyr Koluzaiev / Anastasiia Yerokhina | 21; 8 | 21; 10 |
| 2 | (South Korea) (Ukraine) | Jeong Min-seon; Viacheslav Yakovlev | 21; 7 | 21; 16 |
| 3 | (South Korea) (Ukraine) | Kim Ga-ram; Mariia Stoliarenko | 21; 7 | 21; 16 |
| 4 | (South Korea) (Ukraine) | In Seok-hyun / Na Gwang-min; Volodymyr Koluzaiev / Viacheslav Yakovlev | 21; 5 | 21; 13 |
| 5 | (South Korea) (Ukraine) | An Hye-won / Bahng Joo-yeong; Mariia Stoliarenko / Anastasiia Yerokhina | 21; 19 | 21; 9 |

=== Japan vs Switzerland ===
Japan
4
Shuangliu Sports Centre Gymnasium Court 5
30 July 2023, 09:00 UTC+8

Switzerland
1

| | | | 1 | 2 | 3 |
|---|---|---|---|---|---|
| 1 | (Japan) (Switzerland) | Naoya Kawashima / Yuto Takiguchi; Arthur Boudier / Minh-Quang Pham | 21; 11 | 21; 8 |
| 2 | (Japan) (Switzerland) | Moe Aoki / Machi Nagasako; Aline Müller / Caroline Racloz | 21; 12 | 21; 19 |
| 3 | (Japan) (Switzerland) | Rei Miyashita; Julien Scheiwiller | 19; 21 | 17; 21 |
| 4 | (Japan) (Switzerland) | Akari Kurihara; Milena Schnider | 21; 14 | 21; 13 |
| 5 | (Japan) (Switzerland) | Kakeru Kumagai / Akari Sato; Arthur Boudier / Caroline Racloz | 22; 20 | 20; 22 | 21; 9 |

=== South Korea vs Switzerland ===
South Korea
5
Shuangliu Sports Centre Gymnasium Court 7
30 July 2023, 17:00 UTC+8

Switzerland
0

| | | | 1 | 2 | 3 |
|---|---|---|---|---|---|
| 1 | (South Korea) (Switzerland) | Kim Young-hyuk / Lee Jung-hyun; Minh-Quang Pham / Aline Müller | 21; 9 | 21; 15 |
| 2 | (South Korea) (Switzerland) | Jeong Min-seon; Julien Scheiwiller | 21; 13 | 21; 16 |
| 3 | (South Korea) (Switzerland) | Kim Ga-ram; Milena Schnider | 21; 15 | 21; 16 |
| 4 | (South Korea) (Switzerland) | Jin Yong / Kim Young-hyuk; Arthur Boudier / Minh-Quang Pham | 21; 10 | 21; 16 |
| 5 | (South Korea) (Switzerland) | Ji Young-bin / Lee Jung-hyun; Caroline Racloz / Ronja Stern | 21; 13 | 21; 13 |

=== Japan vs India ===
Japan
4
Shuangliu Sports Centre Gymnasium Court 1
30 July 2023, 17:00 UTC+8

India
1

| | | | 1 | 2 | 3 |
|---|---|---|---|---|---|
| 1 | (Japan) (India) | Kakeru Kumagai / Akari Sato; Deep Rambhiya / Rutaparna Panda | 21; 16 | 21; 16 |
| 2 | (Japan) (India) | Rei Miyashita; Meiraba Luwang Maisnam | 21; 13 | 21; 18 |
| 3 | (Japan) (India) | Akari Kurihara; Akanksha Matte | 21; 12 | 21; 5 |
| 4 | (Japan) (India) | Naoya Kawashima / Yuto Takiguchi; Viraj Kuvale / Deep Rambhiya | 21; 17 | 21; 15 |
| 5 | (Japan) (India) | Moe Aoki / Machi Nagasako; Rutaparna Panda / Swetaparna Panda | 15; 21 | 15; 21 |

=== South Korea vs India ===
South Korea
4
Shuangliu Sports Centre Gymnasium Court 4
31 July 2023, 09:00 UTC+8

India
1

| | | | 1 | 2 | 3 |
|---|---|---|---|---|---|
| 1 | (South Korea) (India) | Kim Young-hyuk / Lee Jung-hyun; Deep Rambhiya / Rutaparna Panda | 20; 22 | 21; 9 | 21; 18 |
| 2 | (South Korea) (India) | Jeong Min-seon; Meiraba Luwang Maisnam | 15; 21 | 20; 22 |
| 3 | (South Korea) (India) | Kim Ga-ram; Taneesha Singh | 21; 17 | 21; 18 |
| 4 | (South Korea) (India) | Jin Yong / Kim Young-hyuk; Viraj Kuvale / Deep Rambhiya | 21; 11 | 21; 16 |
| 5 | (South Korea) (India) | Ji Young-bin / Lee Jung-hyun; Rutaparna Panda / Swetaparna Panda | 21; 17 | 21; 12 |

=== Switzerland vs Ukraine ===
Switzerland
4
Shuangliu Sports Centre Gymnasium Court 6
31 July 2023, 09:00 UTC+8

Ukraine
1

| | | | 1 | 2 | 3 |
|---|---|---|---|---|---|
| 1 | (Switzerland) (Ukraine) | Arthur Boudier / Caroline Racloz; Volodymyr Koluzaiev / Viacheslav Yakovlev | 21; 12 | 21; 11 |
| 2 | (Switzerland) (Ukraine) | Julien Scheiwiller; Viacheslav Yakovlev | 21; 15 | 21; 12 |
| 3 | (Switzerland) (Ukraine) | Milena Schnider; Mariia Stoliarenko | 21; 11 | 21; 15 |
| 4 | (Switzerland) (Ukraine) | Arthur Boudier / Minh-Quang Pham; Volodymyr Koluzaiev / Viacheslav Yakovlev | 21; 15 | 21; 15 |
| 5 | (Switzerland) (Ukraine) | Aline Müller / Caroline Racloz; Mariia Stoliarenko / Anastasiia Yerokhina | 21; 19 | 23; 25 | 17; 21 |

=== South Korea vs Japan ===
South Korea
5
Shuangliu Sports Centre Gymnasium Court 1
31 July 2023, 17:00 UTC+8

Japan
0

| | | | 1 | 2 | 3 |
|---|---|---|---|---|---|
| 1 | (South Korea) (Japan) | Kim Young-hyuk / Lee Jung-hyun; Kakeru Kumagai / Akari Sato | 20; 22 | 21; 15 | 21; 17 |
| 2 | (South Korea) (Japan) | Jeong Min-seon; Rei Miyashita | 21; 7 | 21; 14 |
| 3 | (South Korea) (Japan) | Kim Ga-ram; Akari Kurihara | 21; 18 | 21; 18 |
| 4 | (South Korea) (Japan) | Jin Yong / Kim Young-hyuk; Naoya Kawashima / Yuto Takiguchi | 21; 19 | 21; 15 |
| 5 | (South Korea) (Japan) | Ji Young-bin / Lee Jung-hyun; Machi Nagasako / Rio Uemura | 25; 27 | 21; 18 | 21; 13 |

=== India vs Ukraine ===
India
5
Shuangliu Sports Centre Gymnasium Court 2
31 July 2023, 17:00 UTC+8

Ukraine
0

| | | | 1 | 2 | 3 |
|---|---|---|---|---|---|
| 1 | (India) (Ukraine) | Viraj Kuvale / Swetaparna Panda; Volodymyr Koluzaiev / Mariia Stoliarenko | 21; 18 | 21; 8 |
| 2 | (India) (Ukraine) | Arya Bhivpathaki; Viacheslav Yakovlev | 21; 10 | 21; 11 |
| 3 | (India) (Ukraine) | Taneesha Singh; Mariia Stoliarenko | 21; 17 | 21; 10 |
| 4 | (India) (Ukraine) | Viraj Kuvale / Deep Rambhiya; Volodymyr Koluzaiev / Viacheslav Yakovlev | 21; 15 | 21; 16 |
| 5 | (India) (Ukraine) | Rutaparna Panda / Swetaparna Panda; Mariia Stoliarenko / Anastasiia Yerokhina | 21; 7 | 21; 13 |

=== Japan vs Ukraine ===
Japan
5
Shuangliu Sports Centre Gymnasium Court 2
1 August 2023, 09:00 UTC+8

Ukraine
0

| | | | 1 | 2 | 3 |
|---|---|---|---|---|---|
| 1 | (Japan) (Ukraine) | Naoya Kawashima / Machi Nagasako; Volodymyr Koluzaiev / Mariia Stoliarenko | 21; 13 | 21; 16 |
| 2 | (Japan) (Ukraine) | Toma Noda; Viacheslav Yakovlev | 21; 11 | 21; 15 |
| 3 | (Japan) (Ukraine) | Miu Uchida; Anastasiia Yerokhina | 21; 7 | 21; 15 |
| 4 | (Japan) (Ukraine) | Kakeru Kumagai / Shuta Machida; Volodymyr Koluzaiev / Viacheslav Yakovlev | 21; 12 | 21; 15 |
| 5 | (Japan) (Ukraine) | Moe Aoki / Rio Uemura; Mariia Stoliarenko / Anastasiia Yerokhina | 21; 10 | 21; 18 |

=== India vs Switzerland ===
India
5
Shuangliu Sports Centre Gymnasium Court 1
1 August 2023, 09:00 UTC+8

Switzerland
0

| | | | 1 | 2 | 3 |
|---|---|---|---|---|---|
| 1 | (India) (Switzerland) | Deep Rambhiya / Rutaparna Panda; Minh-Quang Pham / Aline Müller | 21; 16 | 21; 19 |
| 2 | (India) (Switzerland) | Arya Bhivpathaki; Patrick Zbinden | 21; 12 | 21; 11 |
| 3 | (India) (Switzerland) | Akanksha Matte; Ronja Stern | 21; 15 | 21; 16 |
| 4 | (India) (Switzerland) | Viraj Kuvale / Deep Rambhiya; Arthur Boudier / Minh-Quang Pham | 20; 22 | 21; 18 | 21; 18 |
| 5 | (India) (Switzerland) | Rutaparna Panda / Swetaparna Panda; Aline Müller / Caroline Racloz | 18; 21 | 23; 21 | 21; 6 |

== Group D ==
| Pos | Team | Pld | W | L | MF | MA | MD | GF | GA | GD | PF | PA | PD | Pts | Qualification | Chinese Taipei for Universiade | Hong Kong | Germany | Estonia |
|---|---|---|---|---|---|---|---|---|---|---|---|---|---|---|---|---|---|---|---|
| 1 | Chinese Taipei | 3 | 3 | 0 | 15 | 0 | +15 | 30 | 4 | +26 | 698 | 461 | +237 | 3 | Advance to quarter-finals | — | 5–0 | 5–0 | 5–0 |
| 2 | Hong Kong | 3 | 2 | 1 | 8 | 7 | +1 | 19 | 15 | +4 | 633 | 598 | +35 | 2 | Advance to quarter-finals | | — | 3–2 | 5–0 |
| 3 | Germany | 3 | 1 | 2 | 7 | 8 | −1 | 16 | 17 | −1 | 606 | 566 | +40 | 1 | Advance to 9th to 13th place classification round | | | — | 5–0 |
| 4 | Estonia | 3 | 0 | 3 | 0 | 15 | −15 | 1 | 30 | −29 | 341 | 653 | −312 | 0 | Advance to 9th to 13th place classification round | | | | — |

Source: results.chengdu2021.com

=== Chinese Taipei vs Estonia ===
Chinese Taipei
5
Shuangliu Sports Centre Gymnasium Court 4
30 July 2023, 09:00 UTC+8

Estonia
0

| | | | 1 | 2 | 3 |
|---|---|---|---|---|---|
| 1 | (Chinese Taipei) (Estonia) | Po Li-wei / Chang Ching-hui; Anton Berik / Andra Hoop | 21; 6 | 21; 7 |
| 2 | (Chinese Taipei) (Estonia) | Liao Jhuo-fu; Mikk Ounmaa | 21; 2 | 21; 8 |
| 3 | (Chinese Taipei) (Estonia) | Sung Shuo-yun; Ramona Üprus | 21; 7 | 21; 9 |
| 4 | (Chinese Taipei) (Estonia) | Lee Fang-chih / Po Li-wei; Anton Berik / Mikk Ounmaa | 21; 10 | 21; 12 |
| 5 | (Chinese Taipei) (Estonia) | Teng Chun-hsun / Tung Ciou-tong; Andra Hoop / Ramona Üprus | 21; 7 | 21; 8 |

=== Germany vs Hong Kong ===
Germany
2
Shuangliu Sports Centre Gymnasium Court 2
30 July 2023, 09:00 UTC+8

Hong Kong
3

| | | | 1 | 2 | 3 |
|---|---|---|---|---|---|
| 1 | (Germany) (Hong Kong) | Malik Bourakkadi / Leona Michalski; Yeung Shing Choi / Fu Chi Yan | 20; 22 | 17; 21 |
| 2 | (Germany) (Hong Kong) | Samuel Hsiao; Ko Shing Hei | 21; 12 | 16; 21 | 21; 23 |
| 3 | (Germany) (Hong Kong) | Miranda Wilson; Saloni Samirbhai Mehta | 21; 14 | 21; 10 |
| 4 | (Germany) (Hong Kong) | Bjarne Geiss / Jan Colin Völker; Chow Hin Long / Yeung Shing Choi | 21; 16 | 21; 17 |
| 5 | (Germany) (Hong Kong) | Leona Michalski / Miranda Wilson; Tsang Hiu Yan / Yau Mau Ying | 15; 21 | 19; 21 |

=== Chinese Taipei vs Hong Kong ===
Chinese Taipei
5
Shuangliu Sports Centre Gymnasium Court 6
30 July 2023, 17:00 UTC+8

Hong Kong
0

| | | | 1 | 2 | 3 |
|---|---|---|---|---|---|
| 1 | (Chinese Taipei) (Hong Kong) | Ye Hong-wei / Lee Chia-hsin; Ko Shing Hei / Leung Yuet Yee | 19; 21 | 21; 16 | 21; 18 |
| 2 | (Chinese Taipei) (Hong Kong) | Lee Chia-hao; Mak Pak Ngai | 21; 19 | 21; 16 |
| 3 | (Chinese Taipei) (Hong Kong) | Hsu Wen-chi; Saloni Samirbhai Mehta | 16; 21 | 21; 11 | 21; 16 |
| 4 | (Chinese Taipei) (Hong Kong) | Lee Fang-chih / Po Li-wei; Chow Hin Long / Yeung Shing Choi | 21; 13 | 17; 21 | 21; 19 |
| 5 | (Chinese Taipei) (Hong Kong) | Sung Shuo-yun / Teng Chun-hsun; Tsang Hiu Yan / Yau Mau Ying | 21; 17 | 21; 16 |

=== Germany vs Estonia ===
Germany
5
Shuangliu Sports Centre Gymnasium Court 8
30 July 2023, 17:00 UTC+8

Estonia
0

| | | | 1 | 2 | 3 |
|---|---|---|---|---|---|
| 1 | (Germany) (Estonia) | Bjarne Geiss / Leona Michalski; Mikk Ounmaa / Ramona Üprus | 24; 22 | 21; 15 |
| 2 | (Germany) (Estonia) | Samuel Hsiao; Anton Berik | 21; 8 | 21; 14 |
| 3 | (Germany) (Estonia) | Miranda Wilson; Andra Hoop | 21; 8 | 21; 7 |
| 4 | (Germany) (Estonia) | Malik Bourakkadi / Jan Colin Völker; Anton Berik / Mikk Ounmaa | 21; 11 | 21; 19 |
| 5 | (Germany) (Estonia) | Leona Michalski / Miranda Wilson; Andra Hoop / Ramona Üprus | 21; 10 | 19; 21 | 21; 7 |

=== Chinese Taipei vs Germany ===
Chinese Taipei
5
Shuangliu Sports Centre Gymnasium Court 7
31 July 2023, 09:00 UTC+8

Germany
0

| | | | 1 | 2 | 3 |
|---|---|---|---|---|---|
| 1 | (Chinese Taipei) (Germany) | Po Li-wei / Chang Ching-hui; Malik Bourakkadi / Leona Michalski | 21; 19 | 21; 13 |
| 2 | (Chinese Taipei) (Germany) | Lee Chia-hao; Samuel Hsiao | 21; 9 | 21; 19 |
| 3 | (Chinese Taipei) (Germany) | Hsu Wen-chi; Miranda Wilson | 21; 7 | 21; 12 |
| 4 | (Chinese Taipei) (Germany) | Lee Fang-chih / Ye Hong-wei; Bjarne Geiss / Jan Colin Völker | 16; 21 | 21; 16 | 21; 19 |
| 5 | (Chinese Taipei) (Germany) | Lee Chia-hsin / Teng Chun-hsun; Leona Michalski / Miranda Wilson | 21; 11 | 21; 15 |

=== Hong Kong vs Estonia ===
Hong Kong
5
Shuangliu Sports Centre Gymnasium Court 8
31 July 2023, 09:00 UTC+8

Estonia
0

| | | | 1 | 2 | 3 |
|---|---|---|---|---|---|
| 1 | (Hong Kong) (Estonia) | Yeung Shing Choi / Fu Chi Yan; Mikk Ounmaa / Ramona Üprus | 22; 20 | 21; 14 |
| 2 | (Hong Kong) (Estonia) | Mak Pak Ngai; Anton Berik | 21; 16 | 21; 17 |
| 3 | (Hong Kong) (Estonia) | Yeung Sum Yee; Andra Hoop | 21; 5 | 21; 8 |
| 4 | (Hong Kong) (Estonia) | Lam Sui Wo / Pong Lap Hang; Anton Berik / Mikk Ounmaa | 21; 14 | 21; 11 |
| 5 | (Hong Kong) (Estonia) | Tsang Hiu Yan / Yau Mau Ying; Andra Hoop / Ramona Üprus | 21; 6 | 21; 12 |

== Ranking Stage ==
=== Top 8 ===
Quarterfinals
A1 | China | 3
C2 | Japan | 0
C1 | South Korea | 1
A2 | Thailand | 3
D2 | Hong Kong | 1
B1 | Malaysia | 3
B2 | United States | 1
D1 | Chinese Taipei | 3

Semifinals
A1 | China | 3
A2 | Thailand | 0
B1 | Malaysia | 0
D1 | Chinese Taipei | 3

Final
A1 | China | 2
D1 | Chinese Taipei | 3

==== Quarterfinals ====
China
3
Shuangliu Sports Centre Gymnasium Court 1
1 August 2023 17:00 UTC+8

Japan
0

| | | | 1 | 2 | 3 |
|---|---|---|---|---|---|---|
| 1 | (China) (Japan) | Ren Xiangyu / Liu Xuanxuan; Kakeru Kumagai / Akari Sato | 18; 21 | 21; 18 | 21; 18 |
| 2 | (China) (Japan) | Wang Zhengxing; Toma Noda | 21; 16 | 21; 13 |
| 3 | (China) (Japan) | Han Yue; Akari Kurihara | 21; 9 | 21; 10 |
| 4 | (China) (Japan) | He Jiting / Zhou Haodong; Naoya Kawashima / Yuto Takiguchi | | | | not played |
| 5 | (China) (Japan) | Du Yue / Xia Yuting; Akari Sato / Rio Uemura | | | | not played |

South Korea
1
Shuangliu Sports Centre Gymnasium Court 2
1 August 2023 17:00 UTC+8

Thailand
3

| | | | 1 | 2 | 3 |
|---|---|---|---|---|---|---|
| 1 | (South Korea) (Thailand) | Kim Young-hyuk / Lee Jung-hyun; Ruttanapak Oupthong / Jhenicha Sudjaipraparat | 17; 21 | 16; 21 |
| 2 | (South Korea) (Thailand) | Jeong Min-seon; Panitchaphon Teeraratsakul | 21; 13 | 22; 20 |
| 3 | (South Korea) (Thailand) | Kim Ga-ram; Lalinrat Chaiwan | 12; 21 | 19; 21 |
| 4 | (South Korea) (Thailand) | In Seok-hyun / Jin Yong; Peeratchai Sukphun / Pakkapon Teeraratsakul | 14; 21 | 15; 21 |
| 5 | (South Korea) (Thailand) | Ji Young-bin / Lee Jung-hyun; Chasinee Korepap / Jhenicha Sudjaipraparat | | | | not played |

Hong Kong
1
Shuangliu Sports Centre Gymnasium Court 3
1 August 2023 17:00 UTC+8

Malaysia
3

| | | | 1 | 2 | 3 |
|---|---|---|---|---|---|---|
| 1 | (Hong Kong) (Malaysia) | Yeung Shing Choi / Fu Chi Yan; Wong Tien Ci / Desiree Siow | 18; 21 | 17; 21 |
| 2 | (Hong Kong) (Malaysia) | Saloni Samirbhai Mehta; Yap Rui Chen | 17; 21 | 14; 21 |
| 3 | (Hong Kong) (Malaysia) | Mak Pak Ngai; Faiz Rozain | 21; 16 | 21; 11 |
| 4 | (Hong Kong) (Malaysia) | Tsang Hiu Yan / Yau Mau Ying; Ng Qi Xuan / Teoh Le Xuan | 17; 21 | 12; 21 |
| 5 | (Hong Kong) (Malaysia) | Chow Hin Long / Yeung Shing Choi; Liew Xun / Wong Tien Ci | | | | not played |

United States
1
Shuangliu Sports Centre Gymnasium Court 4
1 August 2023 17:00 UTC+8

Chinese Taipei
3

| | | | 1 | 2 | 3 |
|---|---|---|---|---|---|---|
| 1 | (United States) (Chinese Taipei) | Adrian Mar / Katelin Ngo; Po Li-wei / Chang Ching-hui | 21; 19 | 14; 21 | 21; 16 |
| 2 | (United States) (Chinese Taipei) | Daniel Bielin; Lee Chia-hao | 6; 21 | 8; 21 |
| 3 | (United States) (Chinese Taipei) | Natalie Chi; Sung Shuo-yun | 14; 21 | 13; 21 |
| 4 | (United States) (Chinese Taipei) | Enrico Asuncion / Andre Chim; Lee Fang-chih / Ye Hong-wei | 7; 21 | 14; 21 |
| 5 | (United States) (Chinese Taipei) | Nicole Ju / Kalea Sheung; Lee Chia-hsin / Teng Chun-hsun | | | | not played |

==== Semifinals ====
China
3
Shuangliu Sports Centre Gymnasium Court 1
2 August 2023 09:00 UTC+8

Thailand
0

| | | | 1 | 2 | 3 |
|---|---|---|---|---|---|---|
| 1 | (China) (Thailand) | He Jiting / Du Yue; Ruttanapak Oupthong / Jhenicha Sudjaipraparat | 21; 13 | 19; 21 | 21; 15 |
| 2 | (China) (Thailand) | Wang Zhengxing; Saran Jamsri | 21; 16 | 21; 12 |
| 3 | (China) (Thailand) | Han Yue; Lalinrat Chaiwan | 21; 17 | 21; 13 |
| 4 | (China) (Thailand) | Ren Xiangyu / Tan Qiang; Peeratchai Sukphun / Pakkapon Teeraratsakul | | | | not played |
| 5 | (China) (Thailand) | Li Wenmei / Liu Xuanxuan; Chasinee Korepap / Jhenicha Sudjaipraparat | | | | not played |

Malaysia
0
Shuangliu Sports Centre Gymnasium Court 2
2 August 2023 09:00 UTC+8

Chinese Taipei
3

| | | | 1 | 2 | 3 |
|---|---|---|---|---|---|---|
| 1 | (Malaysia) (Chinese Taipei) | Wong Tien Ci / Desiree Siow; Ye Hong-wei / Lee Chia-hsin | 18; 21 | 16; 21 |
| 2 | (Malaysia) (Chinese Taipei) | Anson Cheong; Lin Chun-yi | 15; 21 | 16; 21 |
| 3 | (Malaysia) (Chinese Taipei) | Yap Rui Chen; Hsu Wen-chi | 21; 18 | 12; 21 | 18; 21 |
| 4 | (Malaysia) (Chinese Taipei) | Liew Xun / Wong Tien Ci; Lee Fang-chih / Ye Hong-wei | | | | not played |
| 5 | (Malaysia) (Chinese Taipei) | Ng Qi Xuan / Teoh Le Xuan; Lee Chia-hsin / Teng Chun-hsun | | | | not played |

==== Final ====
China
2
Shuangliu Sports Centre Gymnasium Court 1
2 August 2023 18:00 UTC+8

Chinese Taipei
3

| | | | 1 | 2 | 3 |
|---|---|---|---|---|---|
| 1 | (China) (Chinese Taipei) | He Jiting / Du Yue; Ye Hong-wei / Lee Chia-hsin | 21; 11 | 21; 12 |
| 2 | (China) (Chinese Taipei) | Wang Zhengxing; Lin Chun-yi | 20; 22 | 17; 21 |
| 3 | (China) (Chinese Taipei) | Han Yue; Hsu Wen-chi | 21; 17 | 21; 6 |
| 4 | (China) (Chinese Taipei) | Ren Xiangyu / Tan Qiang; Lee Fang-chih / Ye Hong-wei | 16; 21 | 21; 18 | 14; 21 |
| 5 | (China) (Chinese Taipei) | Li Wenmei / Liu Xuanxuan; Lee Chia-hsin / Teng Chun-hsun | 12; 21 | 25; 27 |

=== 9th to 13th place classification round ===
9th to 16th places
A3 | France | 3
C4 | Switzerland | 0
C3 | India | 3
A4 | Brazil | 0
D4 | Estonia | 1
B3 | Poland | 3
B4 | Singapore | 2
D3 | Germany | 3

9th to 12th places
A3 | France | 3
C3 | India | 2
B3 | Poland | 0
D3 | Germany | 3

9th place
A3 | France | 3
D3 | Germany | 2

==== 9th to 16th places ====
France
3
Shuangliu Sports Centre Gymnasium Court 7
1 August 2023 17:00 UTC+8

Switzerland
0

| | | | 1 | 2 | 3 |
|---|---|---|---|---|---|
| 1 | (France) (Switzerland) | Roy Enogat / Flavie Vallet; Arthur Boudier / Caroline Racloz | 10; 21 | 18; 21 |
| 2 | (France) (Switzerland) | Grégoire Deschamps; Julien Scheiwiller | 21; 14 | 21; 16 |
| 3 | (France) (Switzerland) | Romane Cloteaux-Foucault; Milena Schnider | 16; 21 | 8; 21 |
| 4 | (France) (Switzerland) | Eloi Adam / Leo Rossi; Arthur Boudier / Minh-Quang Pham | 21; 12 | 21; 14 |
| 5 | (France) (Switzerland) | Sharone Bauer / Flavie Vallet; Aline Müller / Caroline Racloz | 21; 13 | 14; 21 | 21; 16 |

India
3
Shuangliu Sports Centre Gymnasium Court 6
1 August 2023 17:00 UTC+8

Brazil
0

| | | | 1 | 2 | 3 |
|---|---|---|---|---|---|---|
| 1 | (India) (Brazil) | Deep Rambhiya / Rutaparna Panda; Pedro Taveira / Sayane Lima | 21; 4 | 21; 13 |
| 2 | (India) (Brazil) | Adheep Gupta; Welton Menezes | 21; 15 | 21; 12 |
| 3 | (India) (Brazil) | Akanksha Matte; Juliana Viana Vieira | 21; 8 | 21; 15 |
| 4 | (India) (Brazil) | Viraj Kuvale / Deep Rambhiya; Welton Menezes / Pedro Taveira | | | | not played |
| 5 | (India) (Brazil) | Taneesha Singh / Shreya Tiwari; Sayane Lima / Juliana Viana Vieira | | | | not played |

Estonia
1
Shuangliu Sports Centre Gymnasium Court 5
1 August 2023 17:00 UTC+8

Poland
3

| | | | 1 | 2 | 3 |
|---|---|---|---|---|---|---|
| 1 | (Estonia) (Poland) | Mikk Ounmaa / Ramona Üprus; Robert Cybulski / Kornelia Marczak | 21; 15 | 21; 10 |
| 2 | (Estonia) (Poland) | Anton Berik; Łukasz Cimosz | 21; 23 | 13; 21 |
| 3 | (Estonia) (Poland) | Andra Hoop; Anastasiya Khomich | 9; 21 | 14; 21 |
| 4 | (Estonia) (Poland) | Anton Berik / Mikk Ounmaa; Robert Cybulski / Mikołaj Szymanowski | 13; 21 | 17; 21 |
| 5 | (Estonia) (Poland) | Andra Hoop / Ramona Üprus; Paulina Hankiewicz / Anastasiya Khomich | | | | not played |

Singapore
2
Shuangliu Sports Centre Gymnasium Court 8
1 August 2023 17:00 UTC+8

Germany
3

| | | | 1 | 2 | 3 |
|---|---|---|---|---|---|
| 1 | (Singapore) (Germany) | Ng Wee Lim / Lim Su Qi; Malik Bourakkadi / Leona Michalski | 17; 21 | 21; 14 | 9; 21 |
| 2 | (Singapore) (Germany) | Timothy Phang; Samuel Hsiao | 12; 21 | 14; 21 |
| 3 | (Singapore) (Germany) | Grace Chua; Miranda Wilson | 21; 19 | 21; 17 |
| 4 | (Singapore) (Germany) | Neaton Ang / Li Zhengxi; Bjarne Geiss / Jan Colin Völker | 21; 19 | 21; 17 |
| 5 | (Singapore) (Germany) | Melissa Chua / Tan Zhi Yi; Leona Michalski / Miranda Wilson | 14; 21 | 5; 21 |

==== 9th to 12th places ====
France
3
Shuangliu Sports Centre Gymnasium Court 6
2 August 2023 09:00 UTC+8

India
2

| | | | 1 | 2 | 3 |
|---|---|---|---|---|---|
| 1 | (France) (India) | Leo Rossi / Flavie Vallet; Deep Rambhiya / Rutaparna Panda | 13; 21 | 21; 16 | 21; 10 |
| 2 | (France) (India) | Romane Cloteaux-Foucault; Taneesha Singh | 14; 21 | 13; 21 |
| 3 | (France) (India) | Grégoire Deschamps; Meiraba Luwang Maisnam | 15; 21 | 21; 18 | 13; 21 |
| 4 | (France) (India) | Sharone Bauer / Flavie Vallet; Taneesha Singh / Shreya Tiwari | 21; 15 | 21; 13 |
| 5 | (France) (India) | Eloi Adam / Leo Rossi; Viraj Kuvale / Deep Rambhiya | 21; 11 | 21; 19 |

Poland
0
Shuangliu Sports Centre Gymnasium Court 7
2 August 2023 09:00 UTC+8

Germany
3

| | | | 1 | 2 | 3 |
|---|---|---|---|---|---|---|
| 1 | (Poland) (Germany) | Robert Cybulski / Kornelia Marczak; Malik Bourakkadi / Leona Michalski | 16; 21 | 16; 21 |
| 2 | (Poland) (Germany) | Mikołaj Szymanowski; Samuel Hsiao | 19; 21 | 13; 21 |
| 3 | (Poland) (Germany) | Anastasiya Khomich; Miranda Wilson | 7; 21 | 13; 21 |
| 4 | (Poland) (Germany) | Łukasz Cimosz / Robert Cybulski; Bjarne Geiss / Jan Colin Völker | | | | not played |
| 5 | (Poland) (Germany) | Paulina Hankiewicz / Anastasiya Khomich; Leona Michalski / Miranda Wilson | | | | not played |

==== 9th place ====
France
3
Shuangliu Sports Centre Gymnasium Court 7
2 August 2023 17:30 UTC+8

Germany
2

| | | | 1 | 2 | 3 |
|---|---|---|---|---|---|---|
| 1 | (France) (Germany) | Leo Rossi / Flavie Vallet; Malik Bourakkadi / Leona Michalski | 21; 12 | 10; 4 | | retired |
| 2 | (France) (Germany) | Grégoire Deschamps; Samuel Hsiao | 21; 16 | 15; 21 | 20; 22 |
| 3 | (France) (Germany) | Romane Cloteaux-Foucault; Miranda Wilson | 18; 21 | 9; 21 |
| 4 | (France) (Germany) | Eloi Adam / Leo Rossi; Bjarne Geiss / Jan Colin Völker | 21; 18 | 19; 21 | 21; 14 |
| 5 | (France) (Germany) | Sharone Bauer / Flavie Vallet; Leona Michalski / Miranda Wilson | | | | w/o |

== Final ranking ==
| Pos | Team |
|---|---|
| 1st place, gold medalist(s) | Chinese Taipei |
| 2nd place, silver medalist(s) | China |
| 3rd place, bronze medalist(s) | Malaysia |
| 3rd place, bronze medalist(s) | Thailand |
| 5 | Hong Kong |
| 5 | Japan |
| 5 | South Korea |
| 5 | United States |
| 9 | France |
| 10 | Germany |
| 11 | India |
| 11 | Poland |
| 13 | Brazil |
| 13 | Estonia |
| 13 | Singapore |
| 13 | Switzerland |
| 17 | Ukraine |
