= Panitchaphon Teeraratsakul =

Thai badminton player (born 2004)

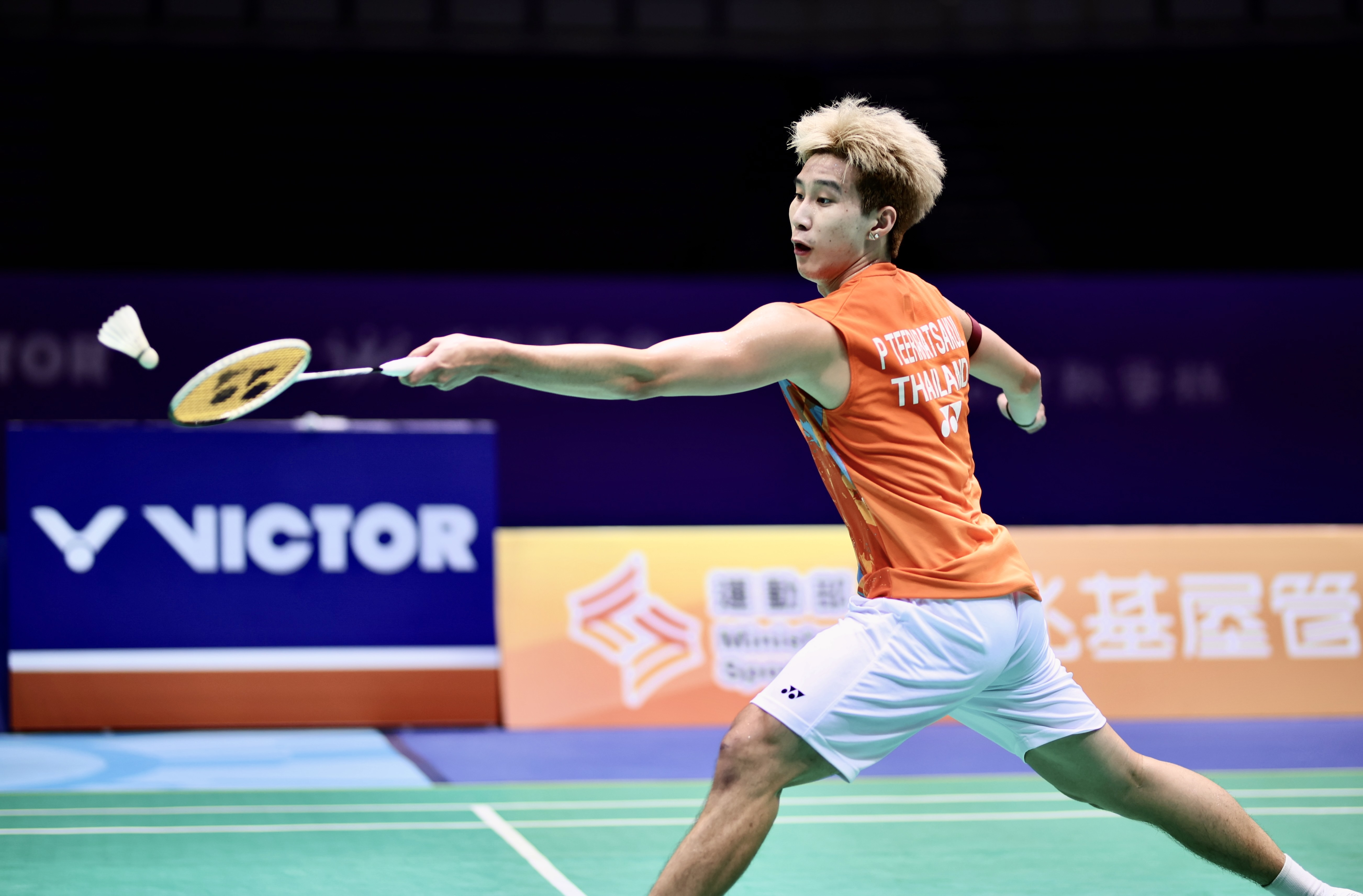
- Panitchaphon at the 2025 Kaohsiung Masters

Personal information
- Nickname: EQ
- Born: 11 November 2004 (age 22) Bangkok, Thailand
- Height: 1.82 m (6 ft 0 in)

Sport
- Country: Thailand
- Sport: Badminton
- Handedness: Left

Men's singles
- Highest ranking: 16 (25 August 2026)
- Current ranking: 18 (17 November 2026)
- BWF profile
Medal record
Men's badminton
Representing Thailand
Asian Games
Bronze medal – third place	2026 Aichi–Nagoya	Men's team
Asia Mixed Team Championships
Bronze medal – third place	2023 Dubai	Mixed team
Bronze medal – third place	2025 Qingdao	Mixed team
SEA Games
Gold medal – first place	2021 Vietnam	Men's team
Bronze medal – third place	2023 Cambodia	Men's team
Bronze medal – third place	2025 Thailand	Men's team
World University Games
Silver medal – second place	2021 Chengdu	Men's singles
Bronze medal – third place	2021 Chengdu	Mixed team
World Junior Championships
Bronze medal – third place	2022 Santander	Boys' singles

Panitchaphon Teeraratsakul (Thai: พณิชพล ธีระรัตน์สกุล; born 11 November 2004) is a Thai badminton player.

== Background ==
Panitchaphon and his twin, Pakkapon Teeraratsakul, began playing badminton at the age of 7 under the guidance of their father, who is a former national badminton player.

== Achievements ==
=== World University Games ===
Men's singles
Year	Venue	Opponent	Score	Result	Ref.
2021	Shuangliu Sports Centre Gymnasium; Chengdu, China	(China) Wang Zhengxing	16–21, 14–21	Silver	

=== World Junior Championships ===
Boys' singles
Year	Venue	Opponent	Score	Result	Ref.
2022	Palacio de Deportes de Santander; Santander, Spain	(India) Sankar Subramanian	13–21, 15–21	Bronze	

=== BWF World Tour (1 title, 4 runners-up) ===
The BWF World Tour, which was announced on 19 March 2017 and implemented in 2018, is a series of elite badminton tournaments sanctioned by the Badminton World Federation (BWF). The BWF World Tour is divided into levels of World Tour Finals, Super 1000, Super 750, Super 500, Super 300, and the BWF Tour Super 100.

Men's singles
Year	Tournament	Level	Opponent	Score	Result	Ref.
2025	Vietnam Open	Super 100	(France) Arnaud Merkle	21–16, 21–10	(gold) Winner	
2025	Kaohsiung Masters	Super 100	(Chinese Taipei) Wang Po-wei	21–12, 18–21, 12–21	(silver) Runner-up	
2026	Indonesia Masters	Super 500	(Indonesia) Alwi Farhan	5–21, 6–21	(silver) Runner-up	
2026	Thailand Masters	Super 300	(Indonesia) Zaki Ubaidillah	19–21, 22–20, 19–21	(silver) Runner-up	
2026	Malaysia Masters	Super 500	(China) Li Shifeng	16–21, 17–21	(silver) Runner-up	

=== BWF International Challenge/Series (1 title, 1 runner-up) ===
Men's singles
Year	Tournament	Opponent	Score	Result
2024	Thailand International	(Indonesia) Ikhsan Rumbay	21–19, 21–12	(gold) Winner

Men's doubles
Year	Tournament	Partner	Opponent	Score	Result
2019	Maldives Future Series	(Thailand) Pakkapon Teeraratsakul	(India) Vaibhaav (India) Prakash Raj	16–21, 15–21	(silver) Runner-up

BWF International Challenge tournament
BWF Future Series tournament
