= Teng Chun-hsun =

Taiwanese badminton player (born 2000)

Teng Chun-hsun 鄧淳薰
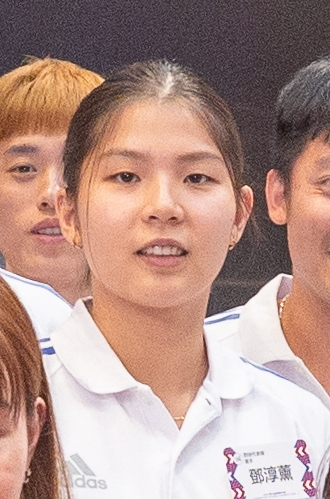
- Teng in 2023

Personal information
- Born: 27 September 2000 (age 26) Taiwan
- Height: 1.73 m (5 ft 8 in)

Sport
- Country: Republic of China (Taiwan)
- Sport: Badminton
- Handedness: Right

Women's doubles
- Highest ranking: 20 (with Lee Chia-hsin, 23 May 2023)
- Current ranking: 48 (with Yang Chu-yun, 5 May 2026)
- BWF profile
Medal record
Women's badminton
Representing Chinese Taipei
World University Games
Gold medal – first place	2021 Chengdu	Mixed team
Silver medal – second place	2021 Chengdu	Mixed doubles

Teng Chun-hsun (Chinese: 鄧淳薰; pinyin: Dèng Chúnxūn; born 27 September 2000) is a badminton player from Taiwan, representing Chinese Taipei.

== Achievements ==
=== World University Games ===
Mixed doubles
Year	Venue	Partner	Opponent	Score	Result
2021	Shuangliu Sports Centre Gymnasium; Chengdu, China	(Chinese Taipei) Lee Fang-chih	(Chinese Taipei) Ye Hong-wei (Chinese Taipei) Lee Chia-hsin	15–21, 17–21	Silver

=== BWF International Challenge/Series (7 titles, 2 runners-up) ===
Women's doubles
Year	Tournament	Partner	Opponent	Score	Result
2017	Waikato International	(Chinese Taipei) Li Zi-qing	(Chinese Taipei) Cheng Yu-pei (Chinese Taipei) Liang Chia-wei	21–16, 21–19	(gold) Winner
2018	Slovak Open	(Chinese Taipei) Li Zi-qing	(Thailand) Ruethaichanok Laisuan (Thailand) Supamart Mingchua	22–20, 19–21, 21–5	(gold) Winner
2018	Portugal International	(Chinese Taipei) Li Zi-qing	(Scotland) Julie MacPherson (Scotland) Eleanor O'Donnell	21–15, 21–13	(gold) Winner
2022	Polish Open	(Chinese Taipei) Lee Chia-hsin	(Hong Kong) Yeung Nga Ting (Hong Kong) Yeung Pui Lam	9–21, 18–21	(silver) Runner-up
2022	Austrian International	(Chinese Taipei) Lee Chia-hsin	(Scotland) Rachel Andrew (Scotland) Sarah Sidebottom	21–8, 21–11	(gold) Winner
2022	Bendigo International	(Chinese Taipei) Lee Chia-hsin	(Chinese Taipei) Chang Ching-hui (Chinese Taipei) Yang Ching-tun	19–21, 22–20, 21–14	(gold) Winner

Mixed doubles
Year	Tournament	Partner	Opponent	Score	Result
2017	Waikato International	(Chinese Taipei) Ye Hong-wei	(Indonesia) Riky Widianto (Indonesia) Richi Puspita Dili	15–21, 24–26	(silver) Runner-up
2017	Sydney International	(Chinese Taipei) Ye Hong-wei	(Australia) Sawan Serasinghe (Australia) Setyana Mapasa	Walkover	(gold) Winner
2018	Slovak Open	(Chinese Taipei) Ye Hong-wei	(Thailand) Pakin Kuna-anuvit (Thailand) Supissara Paewsampran	21–16, 21–16	(gold) Winner

BWF International Challenge tournament
BWF International Series tournament
BWF Future Series tournament
