= Badminton at the 2021 Summer World University Games – Men's singles =

Men's singles at the 2021 Summer World University Games
- Venue: Shuangliu Sports Centre Gymnasium
- Location: Chengdu, China
- Dates: 4 August 2023 – 7 August 2023
- Competitors: 61 from 29 nations

Medalists
gold medal	Wang Zhengxing	China
silver medal	Panitchaphon Teeraratsakul	Thailand
bronze medal	Ko Shing Hei	Hong Kong
bronze medal	Toma Noda	Japan

The men's singles badminton event at the 2021 Summer World University Games was held from 4 to 7 August at the Shuangliu Sports Centre Gymnasium in Chengdu, China.

== Seeds ==
1. Lin Chun-yi (TPE) (Quarter-finals)
2. Lee Chia-hao (TPE) (Second round)
3. Meiraba Luwang Maisnam (IND) (Quarter-finals)
4. Liao Jhuo-fu (TPE) (Third round)

5. Samuel Hsiao (GER) (Quarter-finals)
6. Enogat Roy (FRA) (Third round)
7. Enrico Asuncion (USA) (Second round)
8. Panitchaphon Teeraratsakul (THA) (Final)

Click on the seed number of a player to go to their draw section.

== Draw ==
The draw published on 2 August 2023.

=== Finals ===
Semi-finals
Toma Noda (JPN)	12	16
8	Panitchaphon Teeraratsakul (THA)	21	21
Ko Shing Hei (HKG)	12	16
Wang Zhengxing (CHN)	21	21

Final
8	Panitchaphon Teeraratsakul (THA)	16	14
Wang Zhengxing (CHN)	21	21

=== Top half ===
==== Section 1 ====
First Round
G Alič (SLO)	21	21
S Lohani (NEP)	4	10
N Veenstra (NED)	21	17	9
Phang L W (SGP)	18	21	21
A Cheong (MAS)	21	21
T Oliveros (PHI)	9	13
6	E Roy (FRA)	21	21
M Febriansyah (INA)	12	17
V Koluzaiev (UKR)	21	21
M Musonda (ZAM)	5	5
M Szymanowski (POL)	23	21	21
V Yakovlev (UKR)	25	16	14
Vong K W (MAC)	9	9
T Noda (JPN)	21	21

Second Round
1	Lin C-y (TPE)	21	11
G Alič (SLO)	6	7
Phang L W (SGP)	9	14
A Cheong (MAS)	21	21
6	E Roy (FRA)	21	21
V Koluzaiev (UKR)	7	16
M Szymanowski (POL)	6	13
T Noda (JPN)	21	21

Third Round
1	Lin C-y (TPE)	21	21
A Cheong (MAS)	12	6
6	E Roy (FRA)	14	16
T Noda (JPN)	21	21

Quarter-finals
1	Lin C-y (TPE)	17	17
T Noda (JPN)	21	21

==== Section 2 ====
First Round
O Öztürk (TUR)	21	19	21
O Idowu (NGR)	16	21	13
Jeong M-s (KOR)	21	21
R Miyashita (JPN)	15	12
V Lai (USA)	21	21
R Niftaliyev (AZE)	9	11
8	P Teeraratsakul (THA)	21	21
Ao F L (MAC)	14	15
D Bielin (USA)	21	21
K Mwambu (UGA)	7	7
A Bjivpathaki (IND)	21	21
W Menezes (BRA)	15	12
S Akinsola (NGR)	14	17
Lam S W (HKG)	21	21

Second Round
3	M L Maisnam (IND)	21	21
O Öztürk (TUR)	8	14
Jeong M-s (KOR)	21	21
V Lai (USA)	3	6
8	P Teeraratsakul (THA)	21	21
D Bielin (USA)	15	17
A Bjivpathaki (IND)	21	21
Lam S W (HKG)	14	12

Third Round
3	M L Maisnam (IND)	22	17	21
Jeong M-s (KOR)	20	21	12
8	P Teeraratsakul (THA)	21	21
A Bjivpathaki (IND)	15	8

Quarter-finals
3	M L Maisnam (IND)	21	14	16
8	P Teeraratsakul (THA)	16	21	21

=== Bottom half ===
==== Section 3 ====
First Round
N Ang (SGP)	12	10
A Mahmoud (NED)	21	21
Ł Cimosz (POL)	21	21
I Maata (PHI)	8	7
Ko S H (HKG)	21	21
M Umar (NGR)	7	8
M E Güzel (TUR)	8	15
7	E Asuncion (USA)	21	21
F Rozain (MAS)	21	18	21
P Zbinden (SUI)	13	21	11
Dong TY (CHN)	22	21
Mak P N (HKG)	20	16
R Summers (RSA)	17	8
J Scheiwiller (SUI)	21	21
R Corrales (PHI)	4	6
4	Liao J-f (TPE)	21	21

Second Round
A Mahmoud (NED)	21	21
Ł Cimosz (POL)	9	11
Ko S H (HKG)	21	21
7	E Asuncion (USA)	11	13
F Rozain (MAS)	11	15
Dong TY (CHN)	21	21
J Scheiwiller (SUI)	13	9
4	Liao J-f (TPE)	21	21

Third Round
A Mahmoud (NED)	14	9
Ko S H (HKG)	21	21
Dong TY (CHN)	16	21	21
4	Liao J-f (TPE)	21	17	15

Quarter-finals
Ko S H (HKG)	19	23	21
Dong TY (CHN)	21	21	16

==== Section 4 ====
First Round
S Machida (JPN)	15	13
G Deschamp (FRA)	21	21
Park H-s (KOR)	20	21	18
H Wijayanto (INA)	22	16	21
A Gabilov (AZE)	10	13
Lim Z H (SGP)	21	21
S Jamsri (THA)	18	21	13
5	S Hsiao (GER)	21	19	21
A Gupta (IND)	21	21
P Taveira (BRA)	8	13
Pui C C (MAC)	w	/	o
D Odhiambo (KEN)
A Muyanja (UGA)	3	4
Wang ZX (CHN)	21	21

Second Round
G Deschamp (FRA)	21	18	16
H Wijayanto (INA)	19	21	21
Lim Z H (SGP)	9	16
5	S Hsiao (GER)	21	21
A Gupta (IND)	21	18	21
Pui C C (MAC)	11	21	18
Wang ZX (CHN)	19	21	21
2	Lee C-h (TPE)	21	15	19

Third Round
H Wijayanto (INA)	19	16
5	S Hsiao (GER)	21	21
A Gupta (IND)	8	11
Wang ZX (CHN)	21	21

Quarter-finals
5	S Hsiao (GER)	11	16
Wang ZX (CHN)	21	21
