= Hsu Wen-chi =

Taiwanese badminton player (born 1997)

Hsu Wen-chi 許玟琪
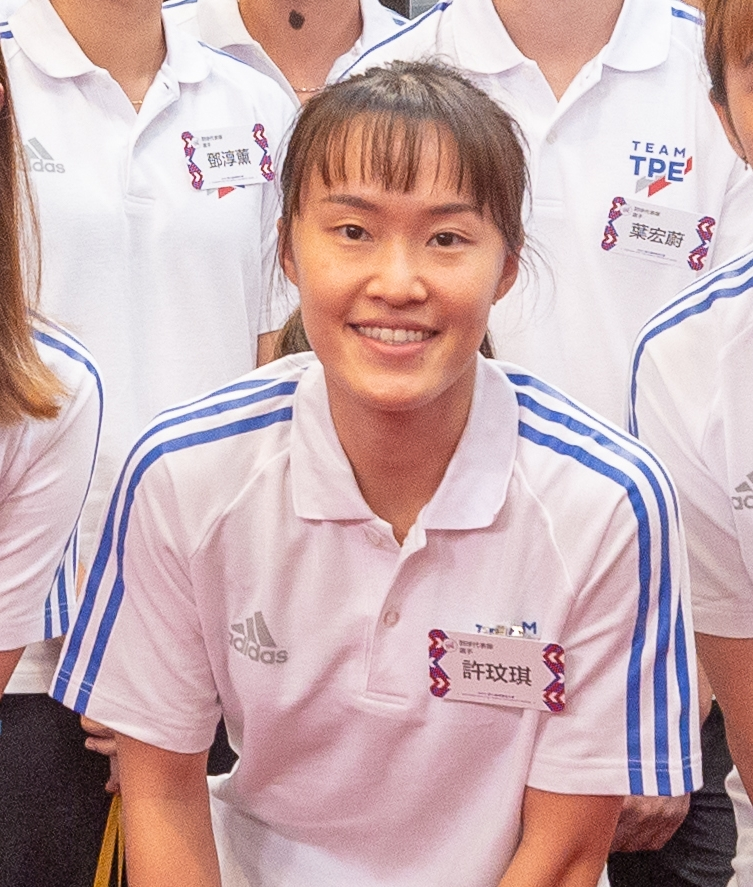

Personal information
- Born: 28 September 1997 (age 29) Taipei, Taiwan

Sport
- Country: Republic of China (Taiwan)
- Sport: Badminton
- Handedness: Right

Women's singles
- Highest ranking: 16 (17 January 2023)
- Current ranking: 57 (25 August 2026)
- BWF profile
Medal record
Women's badminton
Representing Chinese Taipei
World University Games
Gold medal – first place	2021 Chengdu	Mixed team
Bronze medal – third place	2021 Chengdu	Women's singles
Asia Team Championships
Bronze medal – third place	2026 Qingdao	Women's team
World Junior Championships
Bronze medal – third place	2015 Lima	Mixed team

Hsu Wen-chi (Chinese: 許玟琪; pinyin: Xǔ Wénqí; born 28 September 1997) is a Taiwanese badminton player. She started playing badminton at age 9, and debuted at the 2013 Maldives International. She joined the Chinese Taipei national badminton team in 2014. She is the two-time National Championships winner, and the National Games gold medalist.

== Achievements ==
=== World University Games ===
Women's singles
Year	Venue	Opponent	Score	Result
2021	Shuangliu Sports Centre Gymnasium; Chengdu, China	(China) Han Yue	15–21, 15–21	Bronze

=== BWF World Tour (1 title) ===
The BWF World Tour, which was announced on 19 March 2017 and implemented in 2018, is a series of elite badminton tournaments sanctioned by the Badminton World Federation (BWF). The BWF World Tour is divided into levels of World Tour Finals, Super 1000, Super 750, Super 500, Super 300 (part of the HSBC World Tour), and the BWF Tour Super 100.

Women's singles
Year	Tournament	Level	Opponent	Score	Result
2024	Kaohsiung Masters	Super 100	(Chinese Taipei) Pai Yu-po	22–20, 21–18	(gold) Winner

=== BWF International Challenge/Series (9 titles, 2 runners-up) ===
Women's singles
Year	Tournament	Opponent	Score	Result
2021	Belgian International	(Japan) Riko Gunji	21–12, 16–21, 21–23	(silver) Runner-up
2021	Hungarian International	(India) Aditi Bhatt	16–21, 21–11, 21–7	(gold) Winner
2021	Irish Open	(Denmark) Line Kjærsfeldt	21–9, 14–21, 21–15	(gold) Winner
2021	Scottish Open	(Denmark) Line Kjærsfeldt	21–15, 21–18	(gold) Winner
2021	Welsh International	(Canada) Wenyu Zhang	21–15, 22–20	(gold) Winner
2022	Slovak International	(India) Aditi Bhatt	21–19, 10–21, 23–25	(silver) Runner-up
2022	Portugal International	(Hong Kong) Yeung Sum Yee	21–13, 21–17	(gold) Winner
2022	Austrian International	(Chinese Taipei) Sung Shuo-yun	16–21, 21–19, 21–16	(gold) Winner
2022	Italian International	(India) Malvika Bansod	21–9, 21–11	(gold) Winner
2022	Nantes International	(Chinese Taipei) Sung Shuo-yun	20–22, 21–18, 21–11	(gold) Winner
2022	Dutch Open	(Chinese Taipei) Huang Ching-ping	21–19, 21–11	(gold) Winner

BWF International Challenge tournament
BWF International Series tournament
BWF Future Series tournament
