= Badminton at the 2021 Summer World University Games =

Badminton at the Chengdu 2021 FISU World University Games
- Venue: Shuangliu Sports Centre Gymnasium
- Dates: 30 July–7 August 2023
- Competitors: 214 from 33 nations

Badminton was contested at the 2021 Summer World University Games from July 30 to August 7 2023 in Chengdu, China, in the Shuangliu Sports Centre Gymnasium. Men's and women's singles, men's, women's, and mixed doubles, and mixed team events were contested.

== Participating nations ==
214 athletes from 33 nations participated at the 2021 Summer World University Games.

- Azerbaijan (2)
- Brazil (4)
- China (12)
- Estonia (4)
- France (7)
- Germany (6)
- Hong Kong (12)
- Indonesia (10)
- India (12)
- Iran (8)
- Japan (12)
- Kenya (1)
- South Korea (12)
- Macau (7)
- Malaysia (12)
- Netherlands (2)
- Nepal (1)
- Nigeria (4)
- Philippines (9)
- Poland (6)
- South Africa (2)
- Singapore (12)
- Slovenia (1)
- Sri Lanka (2)
- Switzerland (8)
- Slovakia (1)
- Chinese Taipei (12)
- Thailand (12)
- Turkey (4)
- Uganda (7)
- Ukraine (4)
- United States (12)
- Zambia (2)

== Medal summary ==
=== Medal table ===
* Host nation (China)

Rank	Nation	Gold	Silver	Bronze	Total
1	China*	4	3	1	8
2	Chinese Taipei	2	1	2	5
3	Thailand	0	1	2	3
4	South Korea	0	1	1	2
5	Japan	0	0	3	3
6	Malaysia	0	0	2	2
7	Hong Kong	0	0	1	1
Totals (7 entries)		6	6	12	24

=== Medal events ===
Event	Gold	Silver	Bronze
Men's singles	Wang Zhengxing; China	Panitchaphon Teeraratsakul; Thailand	Ko Shing Hei; Hong Kong
Men's singles	Wang Zhengxing; China	Panitchaphon Teeraratsakul; Thailand	Toma Noda; Japan
Women's singles	Han Yue; China	Kim Ga-ram; South Korea	Zhang Yiman; China
Women's singles	Han Yue; China	Kim Ga-ram; South Korea	Hsu Wen-chi; Chinese Taipei
Men's doubles	Ren Xiangyu; Tan Qiang; China	He Jiting; Zhou Haodong; China	Liew Xun; Wong Tien Ci; Malaysia
Men's doubles	Ren Xiangyu; Tan Qiang; China	He Jiting; Zhou Haodong; China	Lee Fang-chih; Po Li-wei; Chinese Taipei
Women's doubles	Li Wenmei; Liu Xuanxuan; China	Du Yue; Xia Yuting; China	Chasinee Korepap; Jhenicha Sudjaipraparat; Thailand
Women's doubles	Li Wenmei; Liu Xuanxuan; China	Du Yue; Xia Yuting; China	Moe Aoki; Machi Nagasako; Japan
Mixed doubles	Ye Hong-wei; Lee Chia-hsin; Chinese Taipei	Lee Fang-chih; Teng Chun-hsun; Chinese Taipei	Jin Yong; Ji Young-bin; South Korea
Mixed doubles	Ye Hong-wei; Lee Chia-hsin; Chinese Taipei	Lee Fang-chih; Teng Chun-hsun; Chinese Taipei	Yuto Takiguchi; Rio Uemura; Japan
Mixed team	Chinese Taipei (TPE); Chang Ching-hui; Hsu Wen-chi; Lee Chia-hao; Lee Chia-hsin; Lee Fang-chih; Liao Jhuo-fu; Lin Chun-yi; Po Li-wei; Sung Shuo-yun; Teng Chun-hsun; Tung Ciou-tong; Ye Hong-wei	China (CHN); Dong Tianyao; Du Yue; Han Yue; He Jiting; Li Wenmei; Liu Xuanxuan; Ren Xiangyu; Tan Qiang; Wang Zhengxing; Xia Yuting; Zhang Yiman; Zhou Haodong	Malaysia (MAS); Mohamad Faris Abdul Khalid; Cheong Anson; Gan Jing Err; Liew Xun; Ng Qi Xuan; Faiz Rozain; Kisona Selvaduray; Desiree Siow Hao Shan; Tan Kok Xian; Teoh Le Xuan; Wong Tien Ci; Yap Rui Chen
Mixed team	Chinese Taipei (TPE); Chang Ching-hui; Hsu Wen-chi; Lee Chia-hao; Lee Chia-hsin; Lee Fang-chih; Liao Jhuo-fu; Lin Chun-yi; Po Li-wei; Sung Shuo-yun; Teng Chun-hsun; Tung Ciou-tong; Ye Hong-wei	China (CHN); Dong Tianyao; Du Yue; Han Yue; He Jiting; Li Wenmei; Liu Xuanxuan; Ren Xiangyu; Tan Qiang; Wang Zhengxing; Xia Yuting; Zhang Yiman; Zhou Haodong	Thailand (THA); Lalinrat Chaiwan; Pornpicha Choeikeewong; Saran Jamsri; Chasinee Korepap; Ratchapol Makkasasithorn; Ruttanapak Oupthong; Pichamon Phatcharaphisuts; Jhenicha Sudjaipraparat; Nannapas Sukklad; Peeratchai Sukphun; Pakkapon Teeraratsakul; Panitchaphon Teeraratsakul
