= Wong Tien Ci =

Malaysian badminton player (born 1998)

Wong Tien Ci 黄天启
Personal information
- Born: 10 January 1998 (age 28) Johor, Malaysia
- Years active: 2014–present
- Height: 1.80 m (5 ft 11 in)

Sport
- Country: Malaysia
- Sport: Badminton
- Handedness: Right
- Coached by: Ong Ewe Hock

Men's & mixed doubles
- Highest ranking: 48 (MD with Boon Xin Yuan, 31 January 2023); 26 (XD with Lim Chiew Sien, 1 April 2025)
- Current ranking: 37 (XD with Lim Chiew Sien, 7 July 2026)
- BWF profile
Medal record
Men's badminton
Representing Malaysia
World University Games
Bronze medal – third place	2021 Chengdu	Men's doubles
Bronze medal – third place	2021 Chengdu	Mixed team

Wong Tien Ci (simplified Chinese: 黄天启; traditional Chinese: 黃天啟; pinyin: Huáng Tiānqǐ; born 10 January 1998) is a Malaysian badminton player who is affiliated with the Serdang Badminton Club in Selangor owned by former national player Ong Ewe Hock.

== Career ==
In 2022, Wong and his partner Boon Xin Yuan won back to back tournaments at the Uganda International and the Slovak Open. They later participated in the Malaysia Open. They were also semifinalists at the 2022 Taipei Open.

Wong also plays mixed doubles and pairs with Lim Chiew Sien. They competed in the Singapore Open and the Orléans Masters but lost in the first two rounds.

== Achievements ==
=== World University Games ===
Men's doubles
Year	Venue	Partner	Opponent	Score	Result
2021	Shuangliu Sports Centre Gymnasium; Chengdu, China	(Malaysia) Liew Xun	(China) Ren Xiangyu (China) Tan Qiang	13–21, 21–19, 14–21	Bronze

=== BWF International Challenge/Series (3 titles, 1 runner-up) ===
Men's doubles
Year	Tournament	Partner	Opponent	Score	Result
2022	Uganda International	(Malaysia) Boon Xin Yuan	(Germany) Jones Ralfy Jansen (Germany) Jan Colin Völker	21–15, 21–14	(gold) Winner
2022	Slovak Open	(Malaysia) Boon Xin Yuan	(Hong Kong) Law Cheuk Him (Hong Kong) Lee Chun Hei	21–18, 14–21, 21–19	(gold) Winner
2024	Malaysia International	(Malaysia) Lim Tze Jian	(Philippines) Solomon Padiz Jr. (Philippines) Julius Villabrille	21–14, 21–23, 16–21	(silver) Runner-up

Mixed doubles
Year	Tournament	Partner	Opponent	Score	Result
2024	Kazakhstan International	(Malaysia) Lim Chiew Sien	(India) Sanjai Srivatsa Dhanraj (India) K. Maneesha	9–21, 21–7, 21–12	(gold) Winner

BWF International Challenge tournament
BWF International Series tournament
BWF Future Series tournament
