= Wang Zhengxing =

Chinese badminton player (born 2002)

Wang Zhengxing 王正行
Personal information
- Born: 21 February 2002 (age 24) Huaihua, Hunan, China
- Height: 1.83 m (6 ft 0 in)

Sport
- Country: China
- Sport: Badminton
- Handedness: Left

Men's singles
- Highest ranking: 16 (5 August 2025)
- Current ranking: 64 (6 October 2026)
- BWF profile
Medal record
Men's badminton
Representing China
Asia Team Championships
Gold medal – first place	2024 Selangor	Men's team
Silver medal – second place	2026 Qingdao	Men's team
World University Games
Gold medal – first place	2021 Chengdu	Men's singles
Silver medal – second place	2021 Chengdu	Mixed team

Wang Zhengxing (Chinese: 王正行; pinyin: Wáng Zhèngxíng; born 21 February 2002) is a Chinese badminton player. He won the men's singles gold medal at the 2021 Summer World University Games.

== Achievements ==
=== World University Games ===
Men's singles
Year	Venue	Opponent	Score	Result	Ref.
2021	Shuangliu Sports Centre Gymnasium; Chengdu, China	(Thailand) Panitchaphon Teeraratsakul	21–16, 21–14	Gold	

=== BWF World Tour (1 title, 5 runners-up) ===
The BWF World Tour, which was announced on 19 March 2017 and implemented in 2018, is a series of elite badminton tournaments sanctioned by the Badminton World Federation (BWF). The BWF World Tours are divided into levels of World Tour Finals, Super 1000, Super 750, Super 500, Super 300, and the BWF Tour Super 100.

Men's singles
Year	Tournament	Level	Opponent	Score	Result
2024	Ruichang China Masters	Super 100	(China) Liu Liang	21–19, 17–21, 21–17	(gold) Winner
2024	Baoji China Masters	Super 100	(China) Hu Zhe'an	18–21, 21–11, 14–21	(silver) Runner-up
2024	Vietnam Open	Super 100	(Japan) Shogo Ogawa	19–21, 20–22	(silver) Runner-up
2024	Korea Masters	Super 300	(Thailand) Kunlavut Vitidsarn	18–21, 18–21	(silver) Runner-up
2025	Thailand Masters	Super 300	(Singapore) Jason Teh	18–21, 21–15, 19–21	(silver) Runner-up
2025	China Open	Super 1000	(China) Shi Yuqi	21–14, 14–21, 15–21	(silver) Runner-up

=== BWF International Challenge/Series (1 title, 1 runner-up) ===
Men's singles
Year	Tournament	Opponent	Score	Result
2023	Bahrain International	(India) Ayush Shetty	21–19, 21–14	(gold) Winner
2023	Vietnam International	(China) Liu Liang	19–21, 21–12, 12–21	(silver) Runner-up

BWF International Series tournament
