= Jhenicha Sudjaipraparat =

Thai badminton player (born 1999)

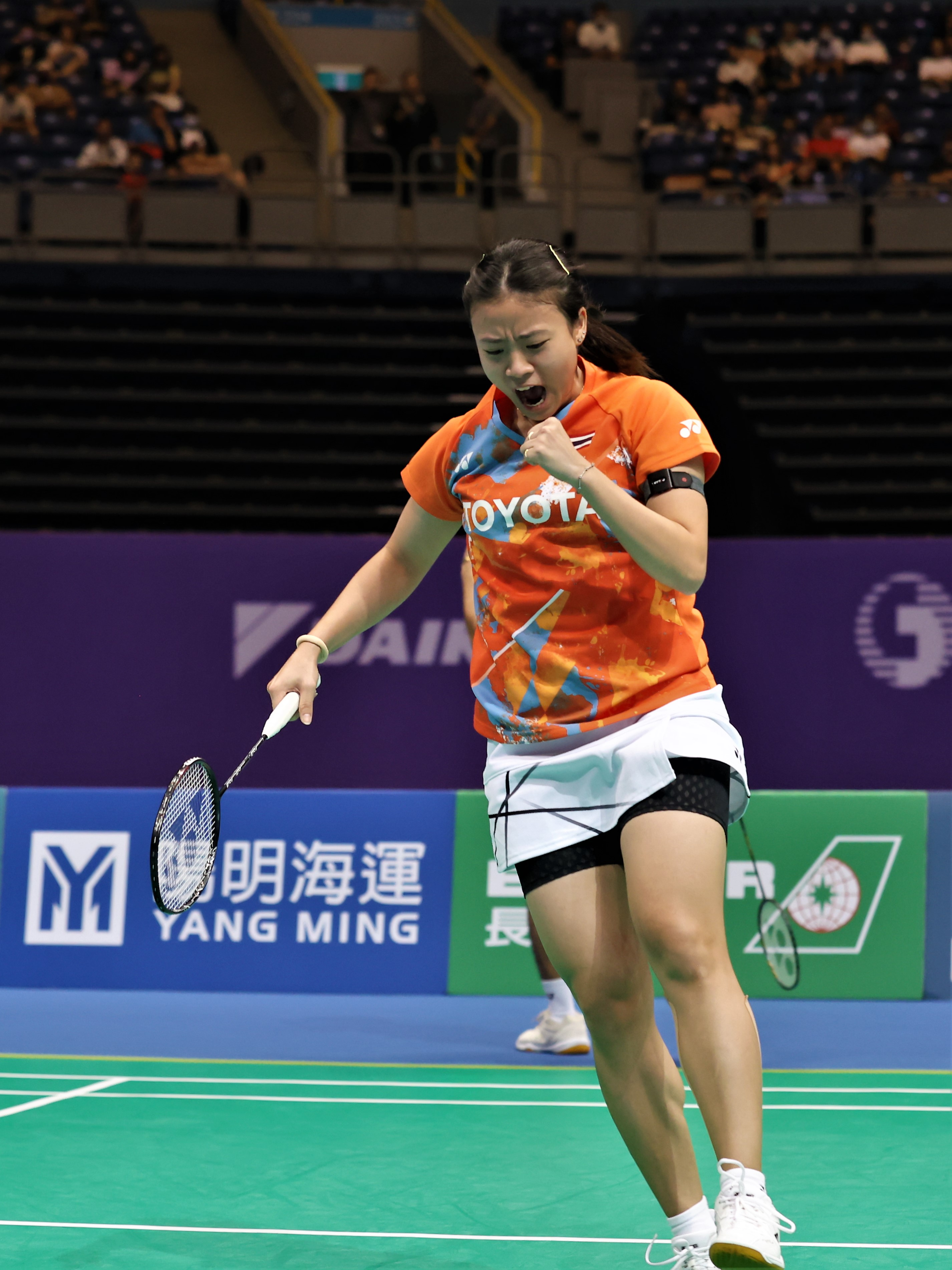
- Sudjaipraparat at the 2024 Kaohsiung Masters

Personal information
- Nickname: Jane
- Born: Kwanchanok Sudjaipraparat ขวัญชนก สุดใจประภารัตน์ 18 February 1999 (age 27) Ayutthaya, Thailand
- Height: 1.58 m (5 ft 2 in)

Sport
- Country: Thailand
- Sport: Badminton
- Handedness: Right

Women's & mixed doubles
- Highest ranking: 44 (WD with Chasinee Korepap, 2 February 2021); 12 (XD with Ruttanapak Oupthong, 11 November 2025)
- Current ranking: 28 (XD with Ruttanapak Oupthong, 10 November 2026)
- BWF profile
Medal record
Women's badminton
Representing Thailand
SEA Games
Gold medal – first place	2025 Thailand	Mixed doubles
Gold medal – first place	2025 Thailand	Women's team
World University Games
Bronze medal – third place	2021 Chengdu	Women's doubles
Bronze medal – third place	2021 Chengdu	Mixed team

Jhenicha Sudjaipraparat (Thai: เฌอย์ณิชา สุดใจประภารัตน์, RTGS: Choenicha Sutchaiprapharat; born Kwanchanok Sudjaipraparat (Thai: ขวัญชนก สุดใจประภารัตน์); 18 February 1999) is a Thai badminton player. She won the gold medals in the mixed doubles and team event at the 2025 SEA Games.

== Achievements ==
=== SEA Games ===
Mixed doubles
Year	Venue	Partner	Opponent	Score	Result	Ref.
2025	Gymnasium 4, Thammasat University Rangsit Campus; Pathum Thani, Thailand	(Thailand) Ruttanapak Oupthong	(Thailand) Dechapol Puavaranukroh (Thailand) Supissara Paewsampran	22–20, 21–19	Gold	

=== World University Games ===
Women's doubles
Year	Venue	Partner	Opponent	Score	Result
2021	Shuangliu Sports Centre Gymnasium; Chengdu, China	(Thailand) Chasinee Korepap	(China) Du Yue (China) Xia Yuting	15–21, 11–21	Bronze

=== BWF World Tour (2 titles, 3 runners-up) ===
The BWF World Tour, which was announced on 19 March 2017 and implemented in 2018, is a series of elite badminton tournaments sanctioned by the Badminton World Federation (BWF). The BWF World Tours are divided into levels of World Tour Finals, Super 1000, Super 750, Super 500, Super 300, and the BWF Tour Super 100.

Mixed doubles
Year	Tournament	Level	Partner	Opponent	Score	Result	Ref.
2023	Vietnam Open	Super 100	(Thailand) Ruttanapak Oupthong	(Japan) Hiroki Nishi (Japan) Akari Sato	21–15, 18–21, 14–21	(silver) Runner-up	
2023 (II)	Indonesia Masters	Super 100	(Thailand) Ruttanapak Oupthong	(Indonesia) Jafar Hidayatullah (Indonesia) Aisyah Pranata	17–21, 19–21	(silver) Runner-up	
2024	Kaohsiung Masters	Super 100	(Thailand) Ruttanapak Oupthong	(Chinese Taipei) Yang Po-hsuan (Chinese Taipei) Hu Ling-fang	21–18, 21–13	(gold) Winner	
2025	U.S. Open	Super 300	(Thailand) Ruttanapak Oupthong	(Denmark) Rasmus Espersen (Denmark) Amalie Cecilie Kudsk	17–21, 21–13, 10–21	(silver) Runner-up	
2025	Canada Open	Super 300	(Thailand) Ruttanapak Oupthong	(United States) Presley Smith (United States) Jennie Gai	21–14, 21–17	(gold) Winner	

=== BWF International Challenge/Series (6 titles, 4 runners-up) ===
Women's doubles
Year	Tournament	Partner	Opponent	Score	Result
2022	Estonian International	(Thailand) Chasinee Korepap	(Russia) Viktoriia Kozyreva (Russia) Mariia Sukhova	21–14, 21–15	(gold) Winner
2022	Swedish Open	(Thailand) Chasinee Korepap	(Sweden) Johanna Magnusson (Sweden) Clara Nistad	21–16, 23–21	(gold) Winner

Mixed doubles
Year	Tournament	Partner	Opponent	Score	Result
2019	Lao International	(Thailand) Mek Nanongrit	(Thailand) Weeraphat Phakjarung (Thailand) Chasinee Korepap	8–21, 28–30	(silver) Runner-up
2022	Estonian International	(Thailand) Ratchapol Makkasasithorn	(Thailand) Ruttanapak Oupthong (Thailand) Chasinee Korepap	21–15, 21–14	(gold) Winner
2022	Nantes International	(Thailand) Ratchapol Makkasasithorn	(Indonesia) Amri Syahnawi (Indonesia) Winny Oktavina Kandow	15–21, 18–21	(silver) Runner-up
2022 (I)	India International Challenge	(Thailand) Ruttanapak Oupthong	(India) Gouse Shaik (India) K. Maneesha	21–18, 21–9	(gold) Winner
2022	Egypt International	(Thailand) Ruttanapak Oupthong	(Thailand) Ratchapol Makkasasithorn (Thailand) Chasinee Korepap	16–21, 9–21	(silver) Runner-up
2022	Bahrain International Series	(Thailand) Ruttanapak Oupthong	(England) Gregory Mairs (England) Jenny Moore	17–21, 16–21	(silver) Runner-up
2022	Bahrain International Challenge	(Thailand) Ruttanapak Oupthong	(India) B. Sumeeth Reddy (India) K. Maneesha	22–20, 21–17	(gold) Winner
2023	Thailand International	(Thailand) Ruttanapak Oupthong	(Indonesia) Adnan Maulana (Indonesia) Nita Violina Marwah	21–13, 21–19	(gold) Winner

BWF International Challenge tournament
BWF International Series tournament
