= Sung Shuo-yun =

Taiwanese badminton player (born 1997)

Sung Shuo-yun 宋碩芸
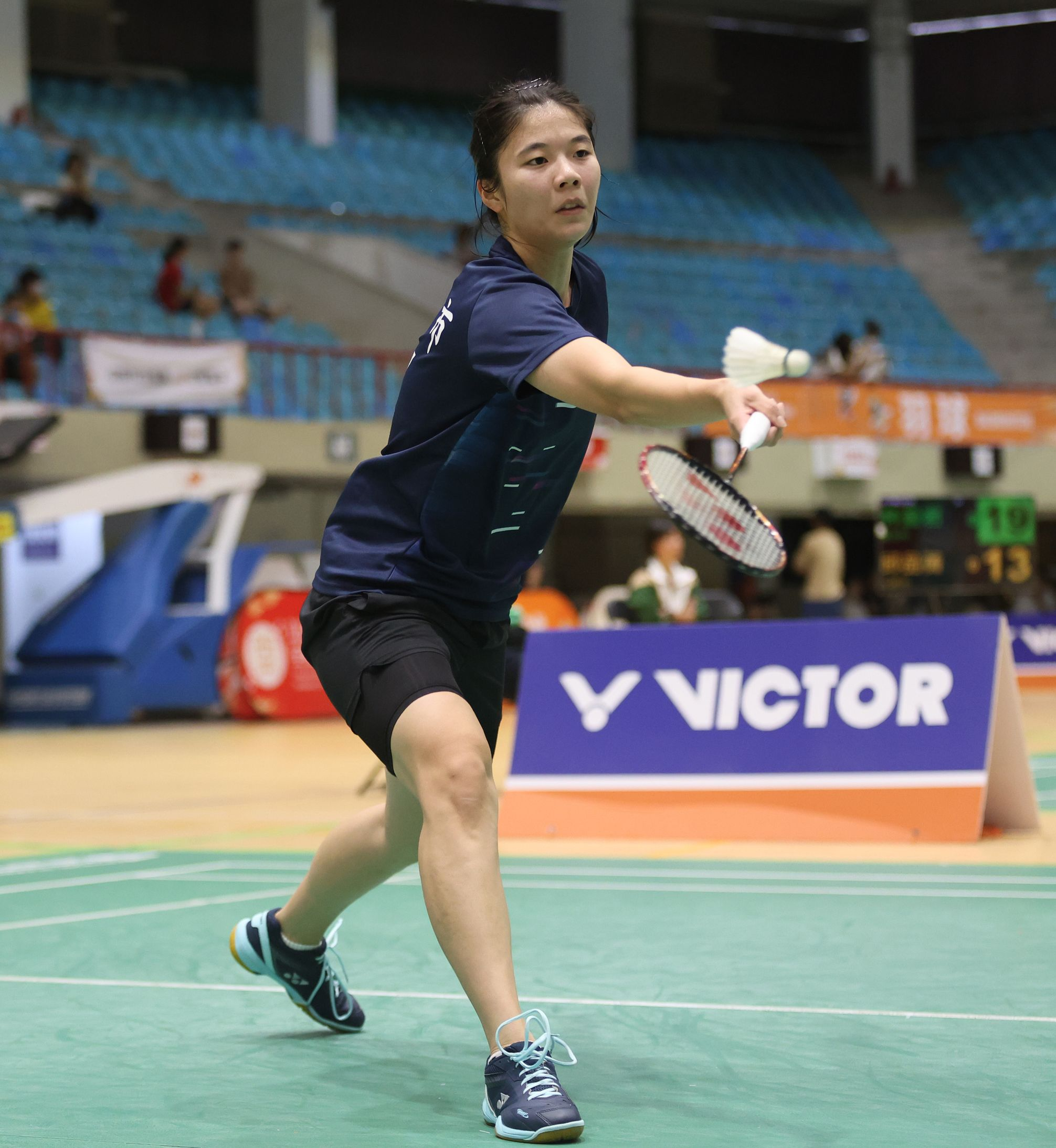
- Sung in 2023

Personal information
- Born: 15 June 1997 (age 29) Taiwan
- Height: 1.65 m (5 ft 5 in)
- Weight: 57 kg (126 lb)

Sport
- Country: Republic of China (Taiwan)
- Sport: Badminton
- Handedness: Right

Women's singles & doubles
- Highest ranking: 18 (WS, 18 March 2025); 13 (WD with Yu Chien-hui, 4 March 2025)
- Current ranking: 39 (WS); 205 (WD with Yu Chien-hui) (3 November 2026)
- BWF profile
Medal record
Women's badminton
Representing Chinese Taipei
Asia Team Championships
Bronze medal – third place	2026 Qingdao	Women's team
World University Games
Gold medal – first place	2021 Chengdu	Mixed team
World Junior Championships
Bronze medal – third place	2011 Taipei	Mixed team
Bronze medal – third place	2015 Lima	Mixed team
Asian Junior Championships
Bronze medal – third place	2014 Taipei	Mixed team

Sung Shuo-yun (Chinese: 宋碩芸; pinyin: Sòng Shuòyún; born 15 June 1997) is a Taiwanese badminton player. She won her first international title at the 2019 Norwegian International.

== Achievements ==
=== BWF World Tour (1 title, 3 runners-up) ===
The BWF World Tour, which was announced on 19 March 2017 and implemented in 2018, is a series of elite badminton tournaments sanctioned by the Badminton World Federation (BWF). The BWF World Tours are divided into levels of World Tour Finals, Super 1000, Super 750, Super 500, Super 300, and the BWF Tour Super 100.

Women's singles
Year	Tournament	Level	Opponent	Score	Result
2022	Canada Open	Super 100	(Canada) Michelle Li	16–21, 15–21	(silver) Runner-up

Women's doubles
Year	Tournament	Level	Partner	Opponent	Score	Result
2023	Guwahati Masters	Super 100	(Chinese Taipei) Yu Chien-hui	(India) Tanisha Crasto (India) Ashwini Ponnappa	13–21, 19–21	(silver) Runner-up
2024	Kaohsiung Masters	Super 100	(Chinese Taipei) Yu Chien-hui	(Indonesia) Jesita Putri Miantoro (Indonesia) Febi Setianingrum	14–21, 18–21	(silver) Runner-up
2024	Hylo Open	Super 300	(Chinese Taipei) Yu Chien-hui	(Ukraine) Polina Buhrova (Ukraine) Yevheniia Kantemyr	21–16, 21–14	(gold) Winner

=== BWF International Challenge/Series (6 titles, 9 runners-up) ===
Women's singles
Year	Tournament	Opponent	Score	Result
2015	Auckland International	(Chinese Taipei) Lee Chia-hsin	14–21, 17–21	(silver) Runner-up
2016	Welsh International	(Spain) Beatriz Corrales	16–21, 21–7, 19–21	(silver) Runner-up
2016	Irish Open	(Denmark) Line Kjærsfeldt	18–21, 18–21	(silver) Runner-up
2019	Norwegian International	(Vietnam) Nguyễn Thùy Linh	21–16, 21–18	(gold) Winner
2019	Scottish Open	(France) Qi Xuefei	21–17, 20–22, 12–21	(silver) Runner-up
2022	Austrian Open	(Chinese Taipei) Hsu Wen-chi	21–16, 19–21, 16–21	(silver) Runner-up
2022	Denmark Masters	(Thailand) Pitchamon Opatniputh	16–21, 21–15, 16–21	(silver) Runner-up
2022	Bonn International	(Indonesia) Stephanie Widjaja	18–21, 15–21	(silver) Runner-up
2022	Nantes International	(Chinese Taipei) Hsu Wen-chi	22–20, 18–21, 11–21	(silver) Runner-up
2022	Sydney International	(Chinese Taipei) Chen Su-yu	17–21, 21–16, 21–14	(gold) Winner
2022	Bendigo International	(Vietnam) Nguyễn Thùy Linh	21–19, 21–15	(gold) Winner
2026	Czech Open	(Canada) Wen Yu Zhang	11–21, 21–17, 21–19	(gold) Winner

Women's doubles
Year	Tournament	Partner	Opponent	Score	Result
2022	Polish International	(Chinese Taipei) Yu Chien-hui	(Japan) Miku Shigeta (Japan) Yui Suizu	18–21, 18–21	(silver) Runner-up
2022	Sydney International	(Chinese Taipei) Yu Chien-hui	(Chinese Taipei) Chang Ching-hui (Chinese Taipei) Yang Ching-tun	21–16, 21–11	(gold) Winner
2022	North Harbour International	(Chinese Taipei) Yu Chien-hui	(Australia) Chen Hsuan-yu (Australia) Gronya Somerville	21–19, 21–17	(gold) Winner

BWF International Challenge tournament
BWF International Series tournament
BWF Future Series tournament
