= Pakkapon Teeraratsakul =

Thai badminton player (born 2004)

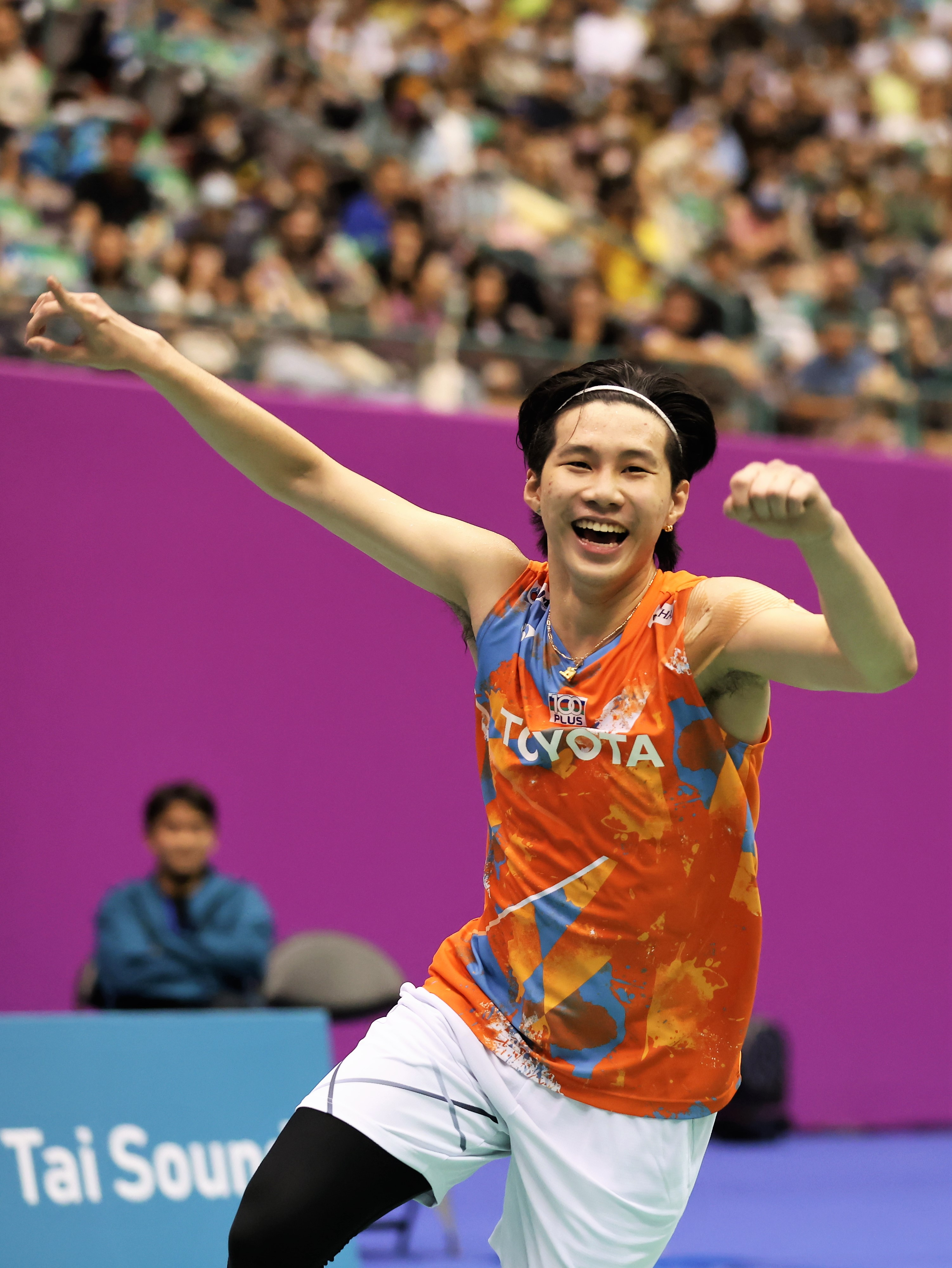
- Pakkapon at the 2024 Taipei Open

Personal information
- Nickname: Omo
- Born: 11 November 2004 (age 22) Bangkok, Thailand
- Height: 1.82 m (6 ft 0 in)

Sport
- Country: Thailand
- Sport: Badminton

Men's & mixed doubles
- Highest ranking: 25 (MD with Peeratchai Sukphun, 27 October 2026); 14 (XD with Sapsiree Taerattanachai, 9 June 2026); 19 (XD with Phataimas Muenwong, 11 March 2025)
- Current ranking: 27 (MD with Peeratchai Sukphun); 18 (XD with Sapsiree Taerattanachai) (17 November 2026)
- BWF profile
Medal record
Men's badminton
Representing Thailand
Asian Games
| Bronze medal – third place | 2026 Aichi–Nagoya | Men's team |
Asia Mixed Team Championships
| Bronze medal – third place | 2023 Dubai | Mixed team |
| Bronze medal – third place | 2025 Qingdao | Mixed team |
World University Games
| Bronze medal – third place | 2021 Chengdu | Mixed team |
| Bronze medal – third place | 2025 Rhine-Ruhr | Men's doubles |
SEA Games
| Gold medal – first place | 2021 Vietnam | Men's team |
| Silver medal – second place | 2023 Cambodia | Men's doubles |
| Bronze medal – third place | 2023 Cambodia | Mixed doubles |
| Bronze medal – third place | 2023 Cambodia | Men's team |
| Bronze medal – third place | 2025 Thailand | Men's team |

Pakkapon Teeraratsakul (Thai: พรรคพล ธีระรัตน์สกุล; born 11 November 2004) is a Thai badminton player. He won the men's and mixed doubles titles at the 2024 U.S. Open.

== Background ==
Pakkapon and his twin, Panitchaphon Teeraratsakul, began playing badminton at the age of 7 under the guidance of their father, who is a former national badminton player.

== Achievements ==
=== World University Games ===
Men's doubles
| Year | Venue | Partner | Opponent | Score | Result |
|---|---|---|---|---|---|
| 2025 | Westenergie Sporthalle; Mülheim, Germany | (Thailand) Peeratchai Sukphun | (China) Cui Hechen (China) Peng Jianqin | 13–15, 15–13, 8–15 | Bronze |

=== SEA Games ===
Men's doubles
| Year | Venue | Partner | Opponent | Score | Result |
|---|---|---|---|---|---|
| 2023 | Morodok Techo Badminton Hall; Phnom Penh, Cambodia | (Thailand) Peeratchai Sukphun | (Indonesia) Pramudya Kusumawardana (Indonesia) Yeremia Rambitan | 17–21, 19–21 | Silver |

Mixed doubles
| Year | Venue | Partner | Opponent | Score | Result |
|---|---|---|---|---|---|
| 2023 | Morodok Techo Badminton Hall; Phnom Penh, Cambodia | (Thailand) Phataimas Muenwong | (Malaysia) Yap Roy King (Malaysia) Cheng Su Yin | 22–24, 27–25, 19–21 | Bronze |

=== BWF World Tour (3 titles, 4 runners-up) ===
The BWF World Tour, which was announced on 19 March 2017 and implemented in 2018, is a series of elite badminton tournaments sanctioned by the Badminton World Federation (BWF). The BWF World Tours are divided into levels of World Tour Finals, Super 1000, Super 750, Super 500, Super 300, and the BWF Tour Super 100.

Men's doubles
| Year | Tournament | Level | Partner | Opponent | Score | Result |
|---|---|---|---|---|---|---|
| 2024 | Thailand Masters | Super 300 | (Thailand) Peeratchai Sukphun | (China) He Jiting (China) Ren Xiangyu | 21–16, 14–21, 13–21 | (silver) Runner-up |
| 2024 | U.S. Open | Super 300 | (Thailand) Peeratchai Sukphun | (Chinese Taipei) Liu Kuang-heng (Chinese Taipei) Yang Po-han | 13–21, 21–16, 21–11 | (gold) Winner |

Mixed doubles
| Year | Tournament | Level | Partner | Opponent | Score | Result |
|---|---|---|---|---|---|---|
| 2023 | Malaysia Super 100 | Super 100 | (Thailand) Phataimas Muenwong | (Malaysia) Chan Peng Soon (Malaysia) Cheah Yee See | 9–21, 21–17, 10–21 | (silver) Runner-up |
| 2024 | U.S. Open | Super 300 | (Thailand) Phataimas Muenwong | (Denmark) Jesper Toft (Denmark) Amalie Magelund | 15–21, 21–19, 21–13 | (gold) Winner |
| 2024 | Taipei Open | Super 300 | (Thailand) Phataimas Muenwong | (Chinese Taipei) Yang Po-hsuan (Chinese Taipei) Hu Ling-fang | 21–17, 21–19 | (gold) Winner |
| 2025 | Syed Modi International | Super 300 | (Thailand) Sapsiree Taerattanachai | (Indonesia) Dejan Ferdinansyah (Indonesia) Bernadine Wardana | 19–21, 16–21 | (silver) Runner-up |
| 2026 | Malaysia Masters | Super 500 | (Thailand) Sapsiree Taerattanachai | (China) Gao Jiaxuan (China) Wei Yaxin | 13–21, 21–15, 11–21 | (silver) Runner-up |

=== BWF International Challenge/Series (3 titles, 2 runners-up) ===
Men's doubles
| Year | Tournament | Partner | Opponent | Score | Result |
|---|---|---|---|---|---|
| 2019 | Maldives Future Series | (Thailand) Panitchaphon Teeraratsakul | (India) Vaibhaav (India) Prakash Raj | 16–21, 15–21 | (silver) Runner-up |
| 2022 | Future Series Nouvelle-Aquitaine | (Thailand) Peeratchai Sukphun | (Chinese Taipei) Lai Po-yu (Chinese Taipei) Tsai Fu-cheng | 21–8, 25–23 | (gold) Winner |
| 2024 | Thailand International | (Thailand) Peeratchai Sukphun | (Malaysia) Aaron Tai (Malaysia) Kang Khai Xing | 17–21, 18–21 | (silver) Runner-up |

Mixed doubles
| Year | Tournament | Partner | Opponent | Score | Result |
|---|---|---|---|---|---|
| 2024 | Vietnam International | (Thailand) Phataimas Muenwong | (Indonesia) Amri Syahnawi (Indonesia) Indah Cahya Sari Jamil | 21–19, 21–12 | (gold) Winner |
| 2024 | Thailand International | (Thailand) Phataimas Muenwong | (Indonesia) Marwan Faza (Indonesia) Felisha Pasaribu | 21–13, 21–9 | (gold) Winner |

BWF International Challenge tournament
BWF International Series tournament
BWF Future Series tournament
