= Shuangliu Sports Centre =

Sports venue in Chengdu, China

Shuangliu Sports Center
- Location in Sichuan Shuangliu Sports Center (China)
- Location: Shuangliu District, Chengdu, Sichuan, China
- Coordinates: 30°34′23.7″N 103°53′37.1″E
- Capacity: 26,000

The Shuangliu Sports Center (Chinese: 双流体育中心) is a sports venue in Shuangliu District, Chengdu, Sichuan, China. Its construction cost 600 million yuan. It has a multi-purpose stadium named Shuangliu Sports Centre Stadium with a capacity of 26,000, and an indoor stadium with a capacity of 3,400. It also has five tennis courts and two basketball courts.

Shuangliu Sports Center hosted the former China League One football team Chengdu Tiancheng F.C. until the team folded in January 2015. A year later, it became the home stadium of the China League Two team Chengdu Qbao, which relocated from Nanjing.

== Notable events ==
- Joker Xue – Skyscraper World Tour - 11 August 2018
- Jacky Cheung – A Classic Tour – 14–15 September 2018
