= Mexico at the 2019 Summer Universiade =

- Flag of Mexico
- IOC code: MEX

in Naples, Italy 3 July 2019 – 14 July 2019
- Medals Ranked 8th: Gold 8 Silver 7 Bronze 6 Total 21

Summer Universiade appearances
- 1959; 1961; 1963; 1965; 1967; 1970; 1973; 1975; 1977; 1979; 1981; 1983; 1985; 1987; 1989; 1991; 1993; 1995; 1997; 1999; 2001; 2003; 2005; 2007; 2009; 2011; 2013; 2015; 2017; 2019; 2021; 2025; 2027

Mexico competed at the 2019 Summer Universiade in Naples, Italy held from 3 to 14 July 2019.

== Medal summary ==
=== Medal by sports ===
Medals by sport
| Archery | 1 | 0 | 1 | 2 |
| Athletics | 3 | 1 | 1 | 5 |
| Diving | 4 | 6 | 1 | 11 |
| Taekwondo | 0 | 0 | 3 | 3 |

=== Medalists ===
| Medal | Name | Sport | Event | Date |
|---|---|---|---|---|
| Gold | Andrea Becerra | Archery | Women's compound individual | July 12 |
| Gold | Valente Mendoza | Athletics | Men's 400 metres | July 10 |
| Gold | Paola Morán | Athletics | Women's 400 metres | July 10 |
| Gold | Fernando Arodi Vega; José Ricardo Jiménez; Édgar Ramírez; Valente Mendoza | Athletics | Men's 4 × 400 metres relay | July 13 |
| Gold | Diego Balleza | Diving | Men's 10 metre platform | July 8 |
| Gold | Dolores Hernández; Carolina Mendoza | Diving | Women's synchronized 3 metre springboard | July 7 |
| Gold | Alejandra Estrella | Diving | Women's 10 metre platform | July 4 |
| Gold | Diego Balleza; Alejandra Estrella | Diving | Mixed synchronized 10 metre platform | July 7 |
| Silver | Frida Corona; Dania Aguillón; Rosa Cook; Paola Morán | Athletics | Women's 4 × 400 metres relay | July 13 |
| Silver | Diego Balleza; Andrés Villarreal | Diving | Men's synchronized 10 metre platform | July 5 |
| Silver | Men's team | Diving | Men's team classification | July 8 |
| Silver | Dolores Hernández | Diving | Women's 3 metre springboard | July 6 |
| Silver | Alejandra Estrella; Daniela Zambrano | Diving | Women's synchronized 10 metre platform | July 6 |
| Silver | Women's team | Diving | Women's team classification | July 8 |
| Silver | Adán Zúñiga; Alejandra Estrella | Diving | Mixed team | July 8 |
| Bronze | Miguel Becerra; Rodolfo González | Archery | Men's compound team | July 12 |
| Bronze | Uziel Muñoz | Athletics | Men's shot put | July 8 |
| Bronze | Andrés Beceiro | Taekwondo | Men's 87 kg | July 12 |
| Bronze | Leonardo Juárez | Taekwondo | Men's individual poomsae | July 7 |
| Bronze | Leonardo Juárez; Ana Ibáñez | Taekwondo | Mixed team poomsae | July 8 |
| Bronze | Adán Zúñiga; Carolina Mendoza | Diving | Mixed synchronized 10 metre platform | July 7 |
