= Italy at the 1963 Summer Universiade =

- IOC code: ITA
- NOC: Italian National Olympic Committee

in Porto Alegre
- Medals Ranked 6th: Gold 3 Silver 5 Bronze 10 Total 18

Summer Universiade appearances (overview)
- 1959; 1961; 1963; 1965; 1967; 1970; 1973; 1975; 1977; 1979; 1981; 1983; 1985; 1987; 1989; 1991; 1993; 1995; 1997; 1999; 2001; 2003; 2005; 2007; 2009; 2011; 2013; 2015; 2017; 2019; 2021; 2025; 2027

Italy competed at the 1963 Summer Universiade in Porto Alegre, Brazil and won 18 medals.

== Medals ==
Sport	1st place, gold medalist(s)	2nd place, silver medalist(s)	3rd place, bronze medalist(s)	Tot.
Athletics	2	2	4	8
Tennis	1	1	2	4
Swimming	0	2	1	3
Fencing	0	0	3	3
Total	3	5	10	18

== Details ==
Sport	1st place, gold medalist(s)	2nd place, silver medalist(s)	3rd place, bronze medalist(s)
Athletics	Roberto Frinolli (400 m hs)	Giorgio Mazza (110 m hs)	Livio Berruti (100 m)
Athletics	Gaetano Dalla Pria (discus throw)	Mauro Bogliatto (high jump)	Livio Berruti (200 m)
Athletics			Salvatore Morale (400 m hs)
Athletics			Sergio Bello; Marco Busatto; Mario Fraschini; Roberto Frinolli (Men's 4x400 metres relay)
Tennis	Maria Teresa Riedl; Giordano Maioli (mixed doubles)	Giordano Maioli (men's single)	Giordano Maioli; Stefano Gaudenzi (men's doubles)
Tennis			Maria Teresa Riedl (women's single)
Swimming		Fritz Dennerlein (200 m butterfly)	Men's 4x100 relay freestyle
Swimming		Men's 4x200 relay medley	
Fencing			Rudiger Wurtz (sabre)
Fencing			Men's Team Épée
Fencing			Men's Team Sabre
