= Italy at the 1961 Summer Universiade =

- IOC code: ITA
- NOC: Italian National Olympic Committee

in Sofia
- Medals Ranked 9th: Gold 3 Silver 0 Bronze 2 Total 5

Summer Universiade appearances (overview)
- 1959; 1961; 1963; 1965; 1967; 1970; 1973; 1975; 1977; 1979; 1981; 1983; 1985; 1987; 1989; 1991; 1993; 1995; 1997; 1999; 2001; 2003; 2005; 2007; 2009; 2011; 2013; 2015; 2017; 2019; 2021; 2025; 2027

Italy competed at the 1961 Summer Universiade in Sofia, Bulgaria and won 5 medals.

== Medals ==
Sport	1st place, gold medalist(s)	2nd place, silver medalist(s)	3rd place, bronze medalist(s)	Tot.
Athletics	1	0	1	2
Tennis	1	0	1	2
Fencing	1	0	0	1
Total	3	0	2	5

== Details ==
Sport	1st place, gold medalist(s)	2nd place, silver medalist(s)	3rd place, bronze medalist(s)
Athletics	Salvatore Morale (400 m hs)		Elio Catola (400 m hs)
Tennis	Maria Teresa Riedl; Massimo Drisaldi (mixed doubles)		Massimo Drisaldi; Stefano Gaudenzi (men's doubles)
Fencing	Team Sabre		
