= Italy at the 1967 Summer Universiade =

- IOC code: ITA
- NOC: Italian National Olympic Committee

in Tokyo
- Medals Ranked 6th: Gold 4 Silver 5 Bronze 9 Total 18

Summer Universiade appearances (overview)
- 1959; 1961; 1963; 1965; 1967; 1970; 1973; 1975; 1977; 1979; 1981; 1983; 1985; 1987; 1989; 1991; 1993; 1995; 1997; 1999; 2001; 2003; 2005; 2007; 2009; 2011; 2013; 2015; 2017; 2019; 2021; 2025; 2027

Italy competed at the 1967 Summer Universiade in Tokyo, Japan and won 18 medals.

== Medals ==
Sport	1st place, gold medalist(s)	2nd place, silver medalist(s)	3rd place, bronze medalist(s)	Tot.
Fencing	2	3	2	7
Athletics	2	0	5	7
Tennis	0	2	1	3
Swimming	0	0	1	1
Total	4	5	9	18

== Details ==
Sport	1st place, gold medalist(s)	2nd place, silver medalist(s)	3rd place, bronze medalist(s)
Fencing	Arcangelo Pinelli (foil)	Men's Team Foil	Nicola Granieri (foil)
Fencing	Men's Team Sabre	Nicola Granieri (épée)	Mario Aldo Montano (sabre)
Fencing		Cesare Salvadori (sciabola)	
Athletics	Eddy Ottoz (110 m hs)		Ippolito Giani (100 m)
Athletics	Ippolito Giani; Ennio Preatoni; Vittorio Roscio; Livio Berruti (Men's 4x100 metres relay)		Ippolito Giani (200 m)
Athletics			Sergio Bello (400 m)
Athletics			Gianni Del Buono (1500 m)
Athletics			Giuseppe Gentile (triple jump)
Tennis		Monica Giorgi; Alessandra Gobbo (women's doubles)	Stefano Gaudenzi; Giordano Maioli (men's doubles)
Tennis		Monica Giorgi; Giordano Maioli (mixed doubles)	
Swimming			Women's 4x100 metres freestyle
