= Italy at the 1983 Summer Universiade =

- IOC code: ITA
- NOC: Italian National Olympic Committee

in Edmonton
- Medals Ranked 4th: Gold 8 Silver 11 Bronze 6 Total 25

Summer Universiade appearances (overview)
- 1959; 1961; 1963; 1965; 1967; 1970; 1973; 1975; 1977; 1979; 1981; 1983; 1985; 1987; 1989; 1991; 1993; 1995; 1997; 1999; 2001; 2003; 2005; 2007; 2009; 2011; 2013; 2015; 2017; 2019; 2021; 2025; 2027

Italy competed at the 1983 Summer Universiade in Edmonton, Canada and won 25 medals.

== Medals ==
Sport	1st place, gold medalist(s)	2nd place, silver medalist(s)	3rd place, bronze medalist(s)	Tot.
Fencing	4	3	2	9
Athletics	3	3	1	7
Cycling	1	1	1	3
Swimming	0	1	3	4
Tennis	0	1	0	1
Volleyball	0	0	1	1
Total	8	11	6	25

== Details ==
Sport	1st place, gold medalist(s)	2nd place, silver medalist(s)	3rd place, bronze medalist(s)
Fencing	Stefano Bellone (epee)	Mauro Numa (foil)	Andrea Borella (foil)
Fencing	Marco Marin (sabre)	Giovanni Scalzo (sabre)	Gianfranco Dalla Barba (sabre)
Fencing	Men's Team Foil	Men's Team Sabre	
Fencing	Men's Team Epee		
Athletics	Claudio Patrignani (1500 m)	Giovanni D'Aleo (20 km walk)	Marco Bucci (discus throw)
Athletics	Alessio Faustini (marathon)	Maurizio Damilano (20 km walk)	
Athletics	Gabriella Dorio (1500 m)	Fausta Quintavalla (javelin throw)	
Cycling	Sergio Scremin (individual road)	Stefano Baudino (trial)	team Trial
Swimming		Cinzia Savi Scarponi (100 m farfalla)	Manuela Dalla Valle (100 m breatstr.)
Swimming		Cinzia Savi Scarponi (200 m medley)	
Swimming		Cinzia Savi Scarponi (400 m medley)	
Tennis		Angelo Binaghi; Raimondo Ricci Bitti (men's doubles)	
Volleyball			Men's National Team
