= Italy at the FISU World University Games =

Italy at the Summer Universiade
- IOC code: ITA
- National federation: Centro Universitario Sportivo Italiano
- Medals Ranked 7th: Gold 224 Silver 236 Bronze 301 Total 761

Summer Universiade appearances (overview)
- 1959; 1961; 1963; 1965; 1967; 1970; 1973; 1975; 1977; 1979; 1981; 1983; 1985; 1987; 1989; 1991; 1993; 1995; 1997; 1999; 2001; 2003; 2005; 2007; 2009; 2011; 2013; 2015; 2017; 2019; 2021; 2025; 2027

Italy has participated in all editions of the Summer Universiade held since the first edition of 1959 Summer Universiade.

== Medal count ==
Italy won 641 medals at the Summer Universiade.

Host nation

Edition					Rank	Notes
(Italy) Turin 1959	18	10	10	38	1	details
(Bulgaria) Sofia 1961	3	0	2	5	9	details
(Brazil) Porto Alegre 1963	3	5	10	18	6	details
(Hungary) Budapest 1965	6	2	1	9	5	details
(Japan) Tokyo 1967	4	5	10	19	6	details
(Italy) Turin 1970	4	4	7	15	4	details
(Soviet Union) Moscow 1973	2	0	6	8	9	details
(Italy) Rome 1975	5	1	1	7	3	details
(Bulgaria) Sofia 1977	1	3	3	7	12	details
Mexico City 1979	3	2	4	9	7	details
(Romania) Bucarest 1981	6	4	3	13	5	details
(Canada) Edmonton 1983	8	11	6	25	4	details
(Japan) Kobe 1985	4	6	5	15	7	details
(Socialist Federal Republic of Yugoslavia) Zagreb 1987	12	8	10	30	4	details
(West Germany) Duisburg 1989	8	3	5	16	4	details
(United Kingdom) Sheffield 1991	6	7	10	23	5	details
(United States) Buffalo 1993	5	9	11	25	9	details
(Japan) Fukuoka 1995	3	7	11	21	12	details
(Italy) Sicily 1997	7	15	10	32	6	details
(Spain) Palma de Mallorca 1999	6	11	8	25	10	details
(China) Beijing 2001	8	8	6	22	6	details
(South Korea) Daegu 2003	2	5	5	12	17	details
(Turkey) Ízmir 2005	5	6	13	24	10	details
(Thailand) Bangkok 2007	6	6	9	21	10	details
(Serbia) Belgrade 2009	6	14	11	31	8	details
(China) Shenzhen 2011	12	5	13	30	6	details
(Russia) Kazan 2013	6	17	22	44	9	details
(South Korea) Gwangju 2015	11	15	17	43	7	details
Taipei 2017	9	6	16	31	8	details
(Italy) Naples 2019	15	13	16	44	6	details
(China) Chengdu 2021	16	18	21	55	4	details
(Germany) Rhein-Ruhr 2025	14	10	19	43	5	details
Total	224	236	301	761	7	

== Athletics ==
=== Medals ===
Edizione	1st place, gold medalist(s)	2nd place, silver medalist(s)	3rd place, bronze medalist(s)	Tot
Turin 1959	7	6	1	14
Sofia 1961	1	0	1	2
Porto Alegre 1963	2	2	4	8
Budapest 1965	4	2	0	6
Tokyo 1967	2	0	5	7
Turin 1970	1	1	4	6
Moscow 1973	2	0	4	6
Rome 1975	5	1	1	7
Sofia 1977	1	2	0	3
Mexico City 1979	2	1	4	7
Bucharest 1981	3	3	2	8
Edmonton 1983	3	3	1	7
Kobe 1985	3	3	0	6
Zagreb 1987	1	1	2	4
Duisburg 1989	3	0	1	4
Sheffield 1991	1	1	4	6
Buffalo 1993	0	3	1	4
Fukuoka 1995	1	4	5	10
Sicily 1997	1	4	3	8
Palma de Mallorca 1999	2	2	2	6
Beijing 2001	2	0	1	3
Daegu 2003	0	0	1	1
Izmir 2005	1	1	2	4
Bangkok 2007	0	1	1	2
Belgrade 2009	1	2	2	5
Shenzhen 2011	0	0	2	2
Kazan 2013	0	1	2	3
Gwangju 2015	0	0	1	1
Taipei 2017	2	2	2	6
Naples 2019	4	0	0	4
Chengdu 2021	3	0	0	3
Rhine-Ruhr 2025	4	1	4	9
Total	62	47	63	172

=== Medallists ===
Italy won 47 gold medals, 45 silver and 57 bronze until 2017 Summer Universiade.

Edition	Event	1st place, gold medalist(s)	2nd place, silver medalist(s)	3rd place, bronze medalist(s)
(Serbia) 2009 Belgrade	4×100 metres relay	Audrey Alloh; Doris Tomasini; Giulia Arcioni; Maria Aurora Salvagno		
(Serbia) 2009 Belgrade	Pole vault		Giorgio Piantella	
(Serbia) 2009 Belgrade	Shot put		Chiara Rosa	
(Serbia) 2009 Belgrade	3000 metres hurdles			Emanuele Abate
(Serbia) 2009 Belgrade	Half marathon			Francesco Bona
(China) 2011 Shenzhen	1500 metres steeplechase			Stefano La Rosa
(China) 2011 Shenzhen	Hammer throw			Lorenzo Povegliano
(Russia) 2013 Kazan	Discus throw		Giovanni Faloci	
(Russia) 2013 Kazan	3000 metres steeplechase			Patrick Nasti
(Russia) 2013 Kazan	1500 metres			Margherita Magnani
(South Korea) 2015 Gwangju	Discus throw			Stefania Strumillo
Taipei 2017	Women's 100 m		Irene Siragusa	
Taipei 2017	Women's 100 m	Irene Siragusa		Anna Bongiorni
Taipei 2017	Women's 400 m hs	Ayomide Folorunso		
Taipei 2017	Men's high jump		Marco Fassinotti	
Taipei 2017	Men's pole vault			Claudio Stecchi
		47	45	57

== See also ==
- Italy at the Olympics
- Italy at the Paralympics
- Italy at the Mediterranean Games
