= Italy at the 1965 Summer Universiade =

- IOC code: ITA
- NOC: Italian National Olympic Committee

in Budapest
- Medals Ranked 5th: Gold 6 Silver 2 Bronze 1 Total 9

Summer Universiade appearances (overview)
- 1959; 1961; 1963; 1965; 1967; 1970; 1973; 1975; 1977; 1979; 1981; 1983; 1985; 1987; 1989; 1991; 1993; 1995; 1997; 1999; 2001; 2003; 2005; 2007; 2009; 2011; 2013; 2015; 2017; 2019; 2021; 2025; 2027

Italy competed at the 1965 Summer Universiade in Budapest, Hungary and won 9 medals.

== Medals ==
Sport	1st place, gold medalist(s)	2nd place, silver medalist(s)	3rd place, bronze medalist(s)	Tot.
Athletics	4	2	0	6
Tennis	2	0	1	3
Total	6	2	1	9

== Details ==
Sport	1st place, gold medalist(s)	2nd place, silver medalist(s)	3rd place, bronze medalist(s)
Athletics	Sergio Bello (400 m)	Giovanni Cornacchia (110 m hs)	
Athletics	Eddy Ottoz (110 m hs)	Vanni Rodeghiero (javelin throw)	
Athletics	Roberto Frinolli (400 m hs)		
Athletics	Sergio Bello; Gian Paolo Iraldo; Bruno Bianchi; Roberto Frinolli (Men's 4x400 metres relay)		
Tennis	Maria Teresa Riedl (single)		Maria Teresa Riedl; Giordano Maioli (mixed doubles)
Tennis	Maria Teresa Riedl; Alessandra Gobbo (women's doubles)		
