= Diving at the 2018 Central American and Caribbean Games – Women's 1 metre springboard =

Women's 1 metre springboard at the 2018 Central American and Caribbean Games
- Venue: Complejo Acuático
- Date: 19–20 July 2018
- Competitors: 10 from 6 nations
- Winning total: 282.75 points

Medalists
gold medal	Diana Pineda	Colombia
silver medal	Paola Espinosa	Mexico
bronze medal	Carolina Mendoza	Mexico

The women's 1 metre springboard diving competition at the 2018 Central American and Caribbean Games in Barranquilla was held on 19 and 20 July at the Complejo Acuático.

== Format ==
The competition was held in two rounds:

- Preliminary round: All 10 divers perform five dives; the top 8 divers advance to the final.
- Final: The 8 divers perform five dives and the top three divers win the gold, silver and bronze medals accordingly.

== Schedule ==
All times are Colombia Time (UTC−5)

Date	Time	Round
Thursday, 19 July 2018	10:00	Preliminary
Friday, 20 July 2018	16:00	Final

== Results ==
Green denotes finalists.

Rank	Diver	Preliminary		Final					
Rank	Diver	Points	Rank	Dive 1	Dive 2	Dive 3	Dive 4	Dive 5	Points
1st place, gold medalist(s)	Diana Pineda (COL)	265.75	1	51.75	56.40	54.60	57.60	62.40	282.75
2nd place, silver medalist(s)	Paola Espinosa (MEX)	263.30	2	55.90	54.05	54.00	54.60	58.80	277.35
3rd place, bronze medalist(s)	Carolina Mendoza (MEX)	257.10	3	50.40	54.60	54.00	50.60	50.70	260.30
4	Anisley Garcia (CUB)	249.20	4	50.40	48.30	50.40	58.50	41.25	248.85
5	Prisis Ruiz (CUB)	238.20	5	46.20	52.00	50.40	31.50	48.30	228.40
6	Viviana Uribe (COL)	226.30	7	48.10	45.60	44.85	43.20	43.05	224.80
7	Maria Betancourt (VEN)	235.75	6	48.00	35.10	40.25	42.00	52.00	217.35
8	Angela Hernandez (CUB)	141.65	8	34.65	33.00	24.00	27.60	27.30	146.55
9	Alexandra Mancia (ESA)	121.15	9	Did not advance					
10	Maria Mancia (ESA)	94.65	10	Did not advance					
