= Italy at the 1987 Summer Universiade =

- IOC code: ITA
- NOC: Italian National Olympic Committee

in Zagreb
- Medals Ranked 4th: Gold 12 Silver 8 Bronze 10 Total 30

Summer Universiade appearances (overview)
- 1959; 1961; 1963; 1965; 1967; 1970; 1973; 1975; 1977; 1979; 1981; 1983; 1985; 1987; 1989; 1991; 1993; 1995; 1997; 1999; 2001; 2003; 2005; 2007; 2009; 2011; 2013; 2015; 2017; 2019; 2021; 2025; 2027

Italy competed at the 1987 Summer Universiade in Zagreb, Yugoslavia and won 30 medals.

== Medals ==
Sport	1st place, gold medalist(s)	2nd place, silver medalist(s)	3rd place, bronze medalist(s)	Tot.
Fencing	4	2	3	9
Swimming	3	2	2	7
Rowing	3	2	2	7
Athletics	1	1	2	4
Water polo	1	0	0	1
Canoeing	0	1	0	1
Volleyball	0	0	1	1
Total	12	8	10	30

== Details ==
Sport	1st place, gold medalist(s)	2nd place, silver medalist(s)	3rd place, bronze medalist(s)
Fencing	Andrea Bermond (épée)	Stefano Pantano (épée)	Men's Team Sabre
Fencing	Lucia Traversa (foil)	Annapia Gandolfi (foil)	Ferdinando Meglio (sabre)
Fencing	Men's Team Épée		Men's Team Sabre
Fencing	Women's Team Foil		
Swimming	Lorenzo Carbonari (100 m backstroke)	Manuela Dalla Valle (200 m breatstroke)	Silvia Persi (200 m freestyle)
Swimming	Manuela Dalla Valle (100 m breatstroke)	Manuela Dalla Valle (100 m breatstroke)	Women's 4 × 100 m freestyle
Swimming	Ilaria Tocchini (100 m butterfly)		
Rowing	Lightweight eight	Coxed four	Marco Savino (single)
Rowing	Lightweight double sculls	Ruggero Verroca (Lightweight single)	Coxless pair
Rowing	Lightweight coxless four		
Athletics	Raffaello Ducceschi (20 km walk)	Giacomo Poggi (20 km walk)	Pierlugi Fiorella (20 km walk)
Athletics			Lucio Serrani (hammer throw)
Water polo	Men's National Team		
Canoeing		Alessandro Pieri (K1 1000 m)	
Volleyball			Men's National Team
