= Italy at the 1985 Summer Universiade =

- IOC code: ITA
- NOC: Italian National Olympic Committee

in Kobe
- Medals Ranked 7th: Gold 4 Silver 6 Bronze 5 Total 15

Summer Universiade appearances (overview)
- 1959; 1961; 1963; 1965; 1967; 1970; 1973; 1975; 1977; 1979; 1981; 1983; 1985; 1987; 1989; 1991; 1993; 1995; 1997; 1999; 2001; 2003; 2005; 2007; 2009; 2011; 2013; 2015; 2017; 2019; 2021; 2025; 2027

Italy competed at the 1985 Summer Universiade in Kobe, Japan and won 15 medals.

== Medals ==
Sport	1st place, gold medalist(s)	2nd place, silver medalist(s)	3rd place, bronze medalist(s)	Tot.
Athletics	3	3	0	6
Fencing	1	1	3	5
Swimming	0	2	1	3
Volleyball	0	0	1	1
Total	4	6	5	15

== Details ==
Sport	1st place, gold medalist(s)	2nd place, silver medalist(s)	3rd place, bronze medalist(s)
Athletics	Stefano Mei (5000 m)	Alessandro Andrei (shot put)	
Athletics	Franco Boffi (3000 m steeplechase)	Lucio Serrani (hammer throw)	
Athletics	Orlando Pizzolato (marathon)	Salvatore Nicosia (marathon)	
Fencing	Women's Team Foil	Roberto Manzi (épée)	Men's Team Foil
Fencing			Men's Team Épée
Fencing			Men's Team Sabre
Swimming		Gianni Minervini (100 m breatstroke)	Manuela Dalla Valle (100 m breatstr.)
Swimming		Carla Lasi (800 m freestyle)	
Volleyball			Men's National Team
