= Shooting at the 2019 Summer Universiade =

Shooting at the XXX Summer Universiade
- Venue: Mostra d’Oltremare Padiglione 3
- Dates: 4–9 July

Shooting was contested at the 2019 Summer Universiade from 4 to 9 July 2019 at the Mostra d’Oltremare Padiglione 3 in Naples.

== Medal summary ==
=== Men's events ===
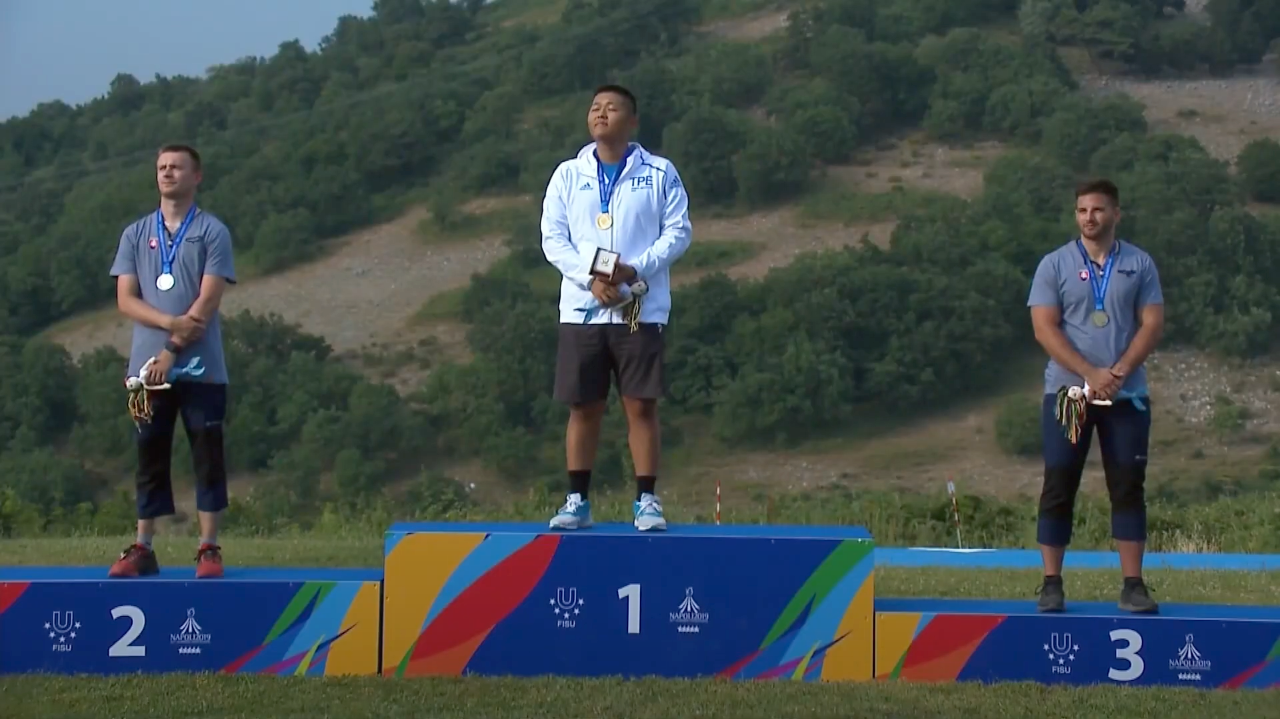
Trap event winners

| Event | Gold | Silver | Bronze |
|---|---|---|---|
| 10 metre air rifle | Patrik Jány; Slovakia | Park Ha-jun; South Korea | Evgenii Panchenko; Russia |
| 10 metre air rifle team | China (CHN); Kang Zhengguo; Wang Yuefeng; Zhang Chaoxuanzhu | Iran (IRI); Hadi Gharehbaghi; Amir Mohammad Nekounam; Mahyar Sedaghat | Slovakia (SVK); Patrik Jány; Matej Medveď; Štefan Šulek |
| 10 metre air pistol | Park Dae-hun; South Korea | Zhang Bowen; China | Sajjad Pourhosseini; Iran |
| Trap | Yang Kun-pi; Chinese Taipei | Filip Marinov; Slovakia | Adrián Drobný; Slovakia |
| Skeet | Nicolas Vasiliou; Cyprus | Timi Vallioniemi; Finland | Angad Vir Singh Bajwa; India |

=== Women's events ===
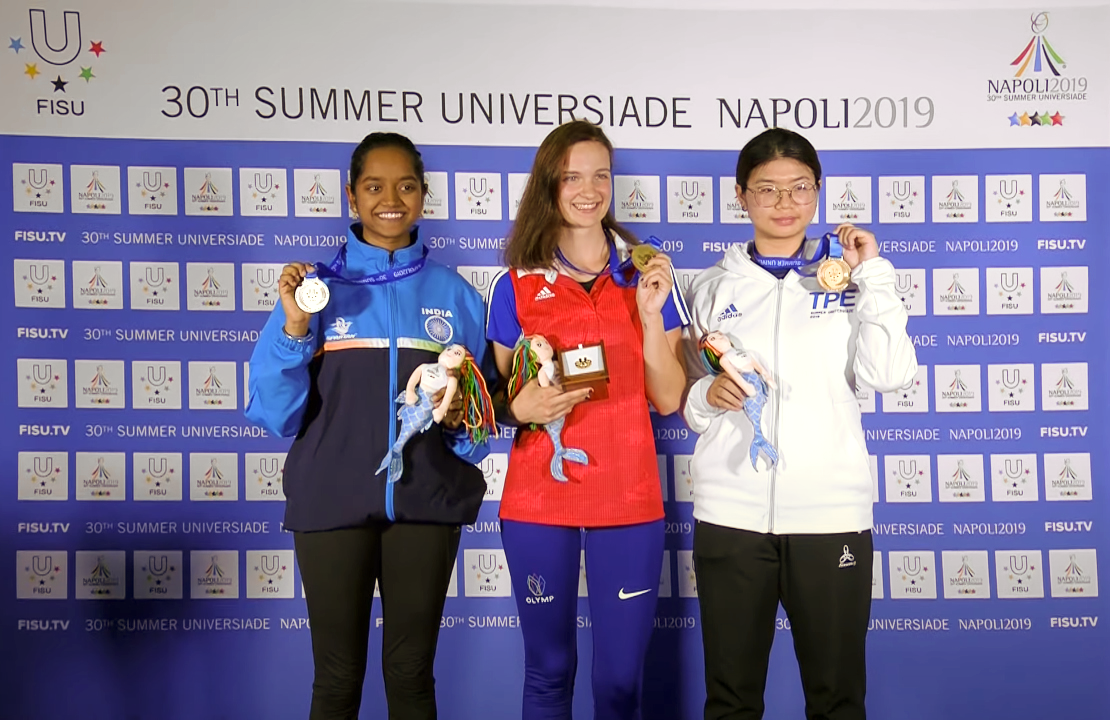
10 metre air rifle winners

| Event | Gold | Silver | Bronze |
|---|---|---|---|
| 10 metre air rifle | Lucie Brázdová; Czech Republic | Elavenil Valarivan; India | Lin Ying-shin; Chinese Taipei |
| 10 metre air rifle team | Poland (POL); Natalia Kochańska; Katarzyna Komorowska; Aneta Stankiewicz | Chinese Taipei (TPE); Chen Yun-yun; Lin Ying-shin; Tsai Yi-ting | India (IND); Nina Chandel; Aayushi Gupta; Elavenil Valarivan |
| 10 metre air pistol | Dorsa Arabshahi; Iran | Hanieh Rostamian; Iran | Kim Min-jung; South Korea |
| Trap | Liu Wan-yu; Chinese Taipei | Fiammetta Rossi; Italy | Sarsenkul Rysbekova; Kazakhstan |
| Skeet | Chiara Di Marziantonio; Italy | Zoya Kravchenko; Kazakhstan | Hana Adámková; Czech Republic |

=== Mixed events ===
| Event | Gold | Silver | Bronze |
|---|---|---|---|
| 10 metre air rifle | Iran (IRI); Mahyar Sedaghat; Najmeh Khedmati | South Korea (KOR); Nam Tae-yun; Seo Ji-woo | Russia (RUS); Evgenii Panchenko; Maria Ivanova |
| 10 metre air pistol | Chinese Taipei (TPE); Kuo Kuan-ting; Yu Ai-wen | South Korea (KOR); Park Dae-hun; Kim Min-jung | Italy (ITA); Dario Di Martino; Maria Varricchio |
| Trap | Italy (ITA); Simone D'Ambrosio; Fiammetta Rossi | Chinese Taipei (TPE); Yang Kun-pi; Liu Wan-yu | Spain (ESP); Aitor Carmona; Cristina Beltrán |

== Medal table ==
* Host nation (Italy)

| Rank | Nation | Gold | Silver | Bronze | Total |
|---|---|---|---|---|---|
| 1 | Chinese Taipei | 3 | 2 | 1 | 6 |
| 2 | Iran | 2 | 2 | 1 | 5 |
| 3 | Italy* | 2 | 1 | 1 | 4 |
| 4 | South Korea | 1 | 3 | 1 | 5 |
| 5 | Slovakia | 1 | 1 | 2 | 4 |
| 6 | China | 1 | 1 | 0 | 2 |
| 7 | Czech Republic | 1 | 0 | 1 | 2 |
| 8 | Cyprus | 1 | 0 | 0 | 1 |
| 8 | Poland | 1 | 0 | 0 | 1 |
| 10 | India | 0 | 1 | 2 | 3 |
| 11 | Kazakhstan | 0 | 1 | 1 | 2 |
| 12 | Finland | 0 | 1 | 0 | 1 |
| 13 | Russia | 0 | 0 | 2 | 2 |
| 14 | Spain | 0 | 0 | 1 | 1 |
| Totals (14 entries) | | 13 | 13 | 13 | 39 |
