= Slovakia at the 2019 Summer Universiade =

- Flag of Slovakia
- IOC code: SVK

in Naples, Italy 3 July 2019 – 14 July 2019
- Medals Ranked 29th: Gold 1 Silver 1 Bronze 2 Total 4

Summer Universiade appearances (overview)
- 1993; 1995; 1997; 1999; 2001; 2003; 2005; 2007; 2009; 2011; 2013; 2015; 2017; 2019; 2021; 2025; 2027

Slovakia competed at the 2019 Summer Universiade in Naples, Italy held from 3 to 14 July 2019. The country won one gold medal, one silver medal and two bronze medals, all in shooting.

== Medal summary ==
=== Medal by sports ===
Medals by sport
Shooting	1	1	2	4
Total	1	1	2	4

=== Medalists ===
Medal	Name	Sport	Event	Date
Gold	Patrik Jány	Shooting	Men's 10 metre air rifle	July 6
Silver	Filip Marinov	Shooting	Men's trap	July 5
Bronze	Patrik Jány; Matej Medveď; Štefan Šulek	Shooting	Men's 10 metre air rifle team	July 6
Bronze	Adrián Drobný	Shooting	Men's trap	July 5
