= Italy at the 1981 Summer Universiade =

- IOC code: ITA
- NOC: Italian National Olympic Committee

in Bucharest
- Medals Ranked 5th: Gold 6 Silver 4 Bronze 3 Total 13

Summer Universiade appearances (overview)
- 1959; 1961; 1963; 1965; 1967; 1970; 1973; 1975; 1977; 1979; 1981; 1983; 1985; 1987; 1989; 1991; 1993; 1995; 1997; 1999; 2001; 2003; 2005; 2007; 2009; 2011; 2013; 2015; 2017; 2019; 2021; 2025; 2027

Italy competed at the 1981 Summer Universiade in Bucharest, Romania and won 13 medals.

== Medals ==
Sport	1st place, gold medalist(s)	2nd place, silver medalist(s)	3rd place, bronze medalist(s)	Tot.
Athletics	3	3	2	8
Fencing	3	0	1	4
Tennis	0	1	0	1
Total	6	4	3	13

== Details ==
Sport	1st place, gold medalist(s)	2nd place, silver medalist(s)	3rd place, bronze medalist(s)
Athletics	Maurizio Damilano (20 km walk)	Carlo Mattioli (20 km walk)	Mariano Scartezzini (3000 m st)
Athletics	Gabriella Dorio (1500 m)	Marisa Masullo (200 m)	Patrizia Lombardo; Marisa Masullo; Carla Mercurio; Antonella Capriotti (Women's 4x100 metres relay)
Athletics	Sara Simeoni (high jump)	Gabriella Dorio (800 m)	
Fencing	Men's Team Foil		Federico Cervi (foil)
Fencing	Giovanni Scalzo (sabre)		Federico Cervi (foil)
Fencing	Men's Team Sabre		Federico Cervi (foil)
Tennis		Angelo Binaghi; Raimondo Ricci Bitti (men's doubles)	
