= Italy at the 1959 Summer Universiade =

- IOC code: ITA
- NOC: Italian National Olympic Committee

in Turin
- Medals Ranked 1st: Gold 18 Silver 10 Bronze 10 Total 38

Summer Universiade appearances (overview)
- 1959; 1961; 1963; 1965; 1967; 1970; 1973; 1975; 1977; 1979; 1981; 1983; 1985; 1987; 1989; 1991; 1993; 1995; 1997; 1999; 2001; 2003; 2005; 2007; 2009; 2011; 2013; 2015; 2017; 2019; 2021; 2025; 2027

Italy competed at the 1959 Summer Universiade in Turin, Italy.

The 38 medals are the highest level of all-time for the Italy at the Universiade.

== Medals ==
Sport	1st place, gold medalist(s)	2nd place, silver medalist(s)	3rd place, bronze medalist(s)	Tot.
Athletics	7	6	1	14
Swimming	7	2	5	14
Tennis	2	0	2	4
Fencing	2	1	1	4
Basketball	0	1	0	1
Water polo	0	0	1	1
Total	18	10	10	38

== Details ==
Sport	1st place, gold medalist(s)	2nd place, silver medalist(s)	3rd place, bronze medalist(s)
Athletics	Livio Berruti (100 m)	Nereo Svara (100 m hs)	Giorgio Mazza (110 m hs)
Athletics	Livio Berruti (200 m)	Germano Gimelli (400 m hs)	
Athletics	Salvatore Morale (400 m hs)	Elio Catola; Nereo Fossati; Mario Fraschini; Germano Gimelli (Men's 4x400 metres relay)	
Athletics	Guido De Murtas; Salvatore Giannone; Giorgio Mazza; Livio Berruti (Men's 4x100 metres relay)	Maurizio Terenziani (long jump)	
Athletics	Attilio Bravi (long jump)	Anna Doro; Fausta Galluzzi; Giuseppina Leone; Nadia Mecocci (Women's 4x100 metres relay)	
Athletics	Giuseppina Leone (100 m)	Elvia Ricci (discus throw)	
Athletics	Giuseppina Leone (200 m)		
Swimming	Gilberto Elsa (100 m dorso)	Roberto Lazzari (200 m backstroke)	Paolo Pucci (100 m freestyle)
Swimming	Fritz Dennerlein (200 m butterfly)	Alessandra Salvi (200 m backstroke)	Mario Liotti (400 m freestyle)
Swimming	Men's 4x200 relay freestyle		Nicoletta Sacco (400 m freestyle)
Swimming	Men's 4x200 relay medley		Cornelia Hruska (100 m butterfly)
Swimming	Rita Androsoni (100 m backstroke)		Women's 4x100 relay freestyle
Swimming	Nicoletta Sacco (100 m freestyle)		
Swimming	Men's 4x200 relay medley		
Tennis	Maria Chiara Ramorino; Maria Teresa Riedl (women's doubles)		Massimo Drisaldi (men's single)
Tennis	Maria Chiara Ramorino; Massimo Drisaldi (mixed doubles)		Maria Teresa Riedl (women's single)
Fencing	Wladimiro Calarese (sabre)	Men's Team Sabre	Women's Team Foil
Fencing	Men's Team Épée		
Basketball		Men's National Team	
Water polo			Men's National Team
