= Diving at the 2018 Central American and Caribbean Games – Women's 3 metre springboard =

Women's 3 metre springboard at the 2018 Central American and Caribbean Games
- Venue: Complejo Acuático
- Date: 25 July 2018
- Competitors: 8 from 5 nations
- Winning total: 321.60 points

Medalists
gold medal	Carolina Mendoza	Mexico
silver medal	Paola Espinosa	Mexico
bronze medal	Diana Pineda	Colombia

The women's 3 metre springboard diving competition at the 2018 Central American and Caribbean Games in Barranquilla was held on 25 July at the Complejo Acuático.

== Format ==
The competition was held in two rounds:

- Preliminary round: All 8 divers perform five dives, with all divers progressing to the final.
- Final: The 8 divers perform five dives and the top three divers win the gold, silver and bronze medals accordingly.

== Schedule ==
All times are Colombia Time (UTC−5)

Date	Time	Round
Wednesday, 25 July 2018	14:00; 16:00	Preliminary; Final

== Results ==
Green denotes finalists.

Rank	Diver	Preliminary		Final					
Rank	Diver	Points	Rank	Dive 1	Dive 2	Dive 3	Dive 4	Dive 5	Points
1st place, gold medalist(s)	Carolina Mendoza (MEX)	294.60	2	61.50	65.10	63.00	69.00	63.00	321.60
2nd place, silver medalist(s)	Paola Espinosa (MEX)	316.80	1	60.20	72.00	40.50	67.50	60.00	300.20
3rd place, bronze medalist(s)	Diana Pineda (COL)	238.85	4	52.80	66.00	56.70	57.00	62.35	294.85
4	Viviana Uribe (COL)	235.05	5	61.50	45.90	60.00	57.40	61.50	286.30
5	Anisley Garcia (CUB)	248.10	3	60.00	58.80	58.80	54.00	52.80	284.40
6	Maria Betancourt (VEN)	230.30	6	52.50	50.40	52.50	54.00	61.50	270.90
7	Arlenys Garcia (CUB)	208.85	7	43.20	42.00	42.00	36.45	43.20	206.85
8	Angela Hernandez (CUB)	157.45	8	34.00	41.85	16.50	40.80	31.05	164.20
