= Diving at the 2019 Summer Universiade – Women's team classification =

Women's team classification at the Universiade
- Venue: Mostra d'Oltremare
- Dates: 2–8 July 2019
- Teams: 18

Medalists
1st place, gold medalist(s)		China (CHN)
2nd place, silver medalist(s)		Mexico (MEX)
3rd place, bronze medalist(s)		South Korea (KOR)

The women's teams classification diving event at the 2019 Summer Universiade was contested between 2 and 8 July 2019 at the Mostra d'Oltremare in Naples, Italy.

== Results ==
Rank	Team	1M		3M		10M		3MS	10MS	M3MS	M10MS	MT	Total
1st place, gold medalist(s)	China (CHN)	262.95	252.95	282.10	260.40	318.05	247.05	288.60	305.76	150.69	154.44	190.90	2713.89
2nd place, silver medalist(s)	Mexico (MEX)	229.25	217.10	245.25	243.00	264.05	231.60	291.00	276,21	139.73	155.57	179.40	2472.16
3rd place, bronze medalist(s)	South Korea (KOR)	228.75	185.05	228.45	187.20	259.00	240.35	249.48	272.85	122.61	125.73	178.60	2278.07
4	Russia (RUS)	201.95	183.80	241.35	240.85	227.75	178.60	248.67	227.82	143.70	143.16	167.55	2205.20
5	Australia (AUS)	197.70	191.35	236.30	192.90	251.30	247.20	238.50	234.84	109.59	136.14	148.48	2184.30
6	United States (USA)	233.50	224.40	265.70	257.90	207.95	190.25	274.20		131.07	141.84	164.23	2091.04
7	Germany (GER)	229.30	219.85	235.65	223.00			258.57		96.45		142.03	1404.85
8	Great Britain (GBR)	212.15	205.75	244.75	238.50	298.15	203.10						1402.40
9	Canada (CAN)	208.25		255.60	206.70	263.10		270.84				151.83	1356.32
10	Italy (ITA)	220.55	183.05	266.25		231.40				120.41		147.00	1168.66
11	Japan (JPN)			219.15		209.30				124.50		137.83	690.78
12	Ukraine (UKR)	201.05		182.45						130.64		160.65	674.79
13	Norway (NOR)	187.50	154.30			173.20							515.00
14	France (FRA)	322.45					215.75						215.75
15	Philippines (PHI)	164.25											164.25
