= Liu Chengming =

Liu Chengming may refer to:

- Liu Chengming (athlete)
- Liu Chengming (diver)
