= Fiammetta Rossi =

Italian sport shooter

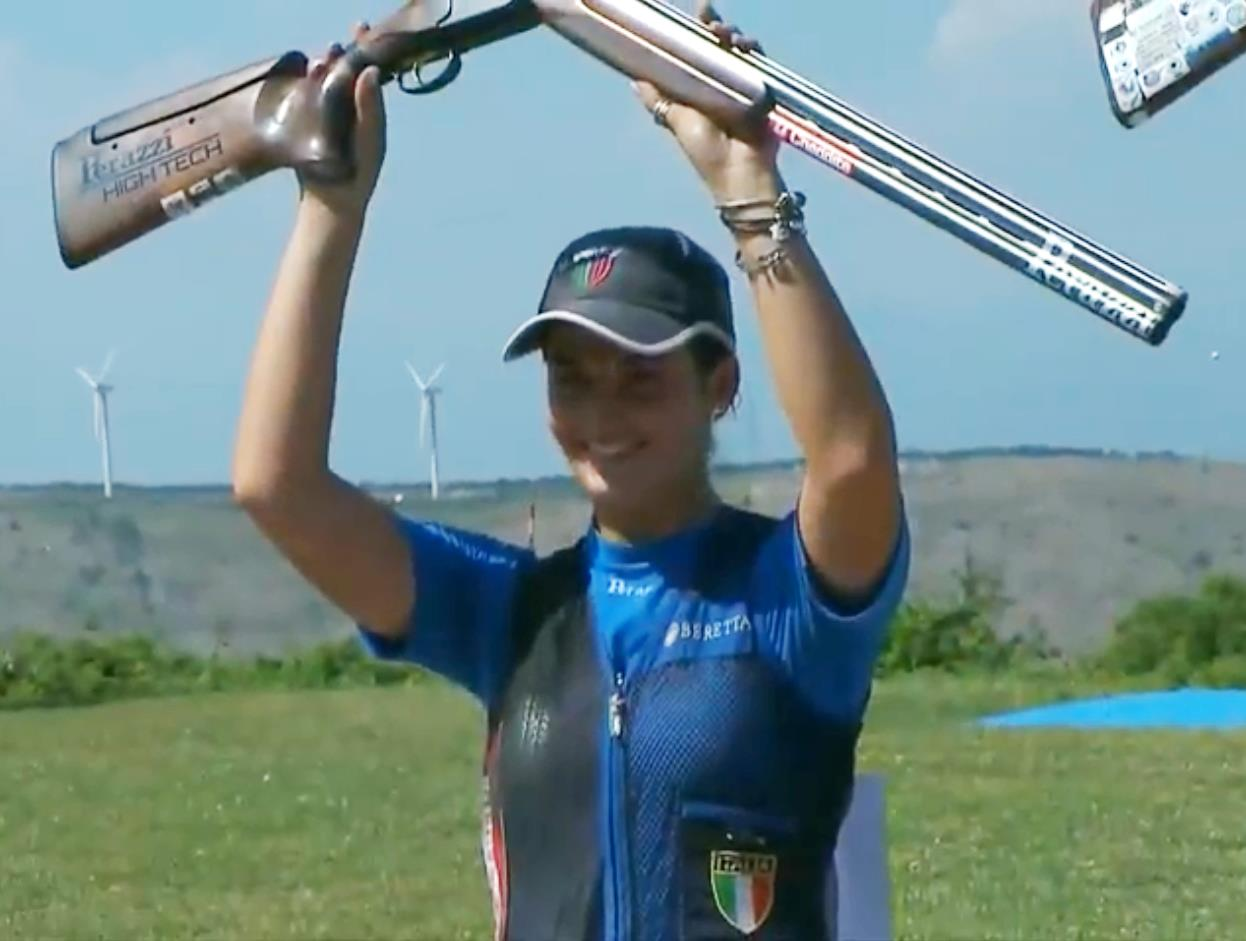
- Rossi in 2019.

Personal information
- Nationality: Italian
- Born: 2 June 1995 (age 31) Montefalco

Sport
- Country: Italy
- Sport: Shooting
- Club: G.S. Fiamme Oro
Medal record
Universiade
Gold medal – first place	2019 Naples	Mixed Trap
Silver medal – second place	2019 Naples	Trap

Fiammetta Rossi (born 2 June 1995) is an Italian shooter who won two medals at the 2019 Summer Universiade.

== Biography ==
She is the daughter of the President of the Federazione Italiana Tiro a Volo (Italian Shooting Federation) Luciano Rossi.

== See also ==
- Italy at the 2019 Summer Universiade
