= Italy at the 1991 Summer Universiade =

- IOC code: ITA
- NOC: Italian National Olympic Committee

in Sheffield
- Medals Ranked 5th: Gold 6 Silver 7 Bronze 8 Total 21

Summer Universiade appearances (overview)
- 1959; 1961; 1963; 1965; 1967; 1970; 1973; 1975; 1977; 1979; 1981; 1983; 1985; 1987; 1989; 1991; 1993; 1995; 1997; 1999; 2001; 2003; 2005; 2007; 2009; 2011; 2013; 2015; 2017; 2019; 2021; 2025; 2027

Italy competed at the 1991 Summer Universiade in Sheffield, United Kingdom and won 21 medals.

== Medals ==
Sport	1st place, gold medalist(s)	2nd place, silver medalist(s)	3rd place, bronze medalist(s)	Tot.
Fencing	3	4	2	9
Athletics	1	1	4	6
Swimming	1	1	0	2
Volleyball	1	0	1	2
Tennis	0	1	0	1
Water polo	0	0	1	1
Total	6	7	8	21

== Details ==
Sport	1st place, gold medalist(s)	2nd place, silver medalist(s)	3rd place, bronze medalist(s)
Fencing	Giovanna Trillini (foil)	Maurizio Randazzo (épée)	Margherita Zalaffi (foil)
Fencing	Men's Team Foil	Alessandro Puccini (foil)	Luca Vitalesta (foil)
Fencing	Women's Team Foil	Women's Team Épée	
Fencing		Men's Team Sabre	
Athletics	Giuseppe D'Urso (800 m)	Davide Tirelli (1500 metres)	Gianrico Boncompagni; Riccardo Cardone; Marcello Pantone; Vito Petrella (Men's 4x400 metres relay)
Athletics			Annarita Balzani; Laura Galligani; Cristina Picchi; Lara Sinico (Women's 4x100 metres relay)
Athletics			Arturo Di Mezza (20 km walk)
Athletics			Annarita Sidoti (10 km walk)
Swimming	Francesca Ferrarini (800 m freestyle)	Laura Savarino (200 m backstroke)	
Volleyball	Women's National Team		Men's National Team
Tennis		Francesco Michelotti (single)	
Water polo			Men's National Team
