= Manuel Ricci =

Italian footballer

Personal information
- Date of birth: 25 April 1990 (age 36)
- Place of birth: Anzio, Italy
- Height: 1.76 m (5 ft 9 in)
- Positions: Midfielder; right winger

Team information
- Current team: Trastevere

Youth career
- 2006–2010: Lazio

Senior career*
Years	Team	Apps	(Gls)
2010–2012	Lazio	0	(0)
2010–2011	→ Monza (loan)	23	(3)
2011–2012	→ Pergocrema (loan)	14	(1)
2012	→ Avellino (loan)	6	(0)
2012–2014	Salernitana	25	(0)
2014–2015	Reggiana	10	(1)
2015–2016	Lupa Roma	15	(1)
2017–2018	Anzio	36	(8)
2018–2019	Matera	16	(5)
2019–2022	Potenza	102	(10)
2022–2023	Juve Stabia	32	(1)
2023	Reggina	8	(0)
2023–	Trastevere	4	(0)

International career
2009	Italy U-20	1	(0)
2013	Italy Universiade	4	(1)
- * Club domestic league appearances and goals as of 20 December 2023

Manuel Ricci (born 25 April 1990) is an Italian footballer who plays as a midfielder for Serie D club Trastevere.

== Club career ==
Having come through the youth system of Lazio, Ricci was sent on loan to Monza in 2010 without having played a senior game for his parent club. On 31 August 2011 he was signed by Pergocrema.

On 31 August 2012 he was farmed to Lega Pro Seconda Divisione club Salernitana in a co-ownership deal.

On 21 August 2014 Ricci was signed by Reggiana in a 1-year deal.

On 4 August 2018, he joined Serie C club Matera.

In June 2022, Ricci signed a contract with Juve Stabia.
