= Federico Masi =

Italian footballer (born 1990)

Personal information
- Date of birth: 10 October 1990 (age 36)
- Place of birth: Frascati, Italy
- Height: 1.90 m (6 ft 3 in)
- Position: Defender

Youth career
- 2005–2010: Fiorentina

Senior career*
Years	Team	Apps	(Gls)
2008–2011	Fiorentina	0	(0)
2011–2014	Bari	5	(0)
2012–2013	→ Venezia (loan)	12	(0)
2014	→ Paganese (loan)	7	(0)
2015	Lupa Roma	2	(0)

International career^{‡}
2005–2006	Italy U-16	9	(1)
2006–2007	Italy U-17	11	(1)
2007–2008	Italy U-20	1	(0)
2011–2012	Italy U-21 Serie B	2	(0)
2013, 2015	Italy Universiade	7	(1)
Medal record
Representing Italy
Summer Universiade
Gold medal – first place	2015 Gwangju
- * Club domestic league appearances and goals as of 27 January 2014 ‡ National team caps and goals as of 20 September 2015

Federico Masi (born 10 October 1990) is a former Italian professional footballer.

Masi can play as a right back or centre-back. He is a former Italy U-20 international.

== Biography ==
=== Fiorentina ===
Born in Frascati, the Province of Rome, Lazio, Masi started his career at Atletico 2000 of Rome. In 2005, he joined Tuscany club Fiorentina, at first on loan. He was the member of Allievi U16–17 team for Allievi National League.

Masi wore no.44 which vacated by Seculin (2008–09), no.48 (2009–10) and no.39 vacated by Keirrison (2010–11) in the first team and named in squad "List B" of 2008–09 and 2009–10 UEFA Champions League. Masi made his professional and European debut on 10 December 2008, replacing Riccardo Montolivo in the last minute. Before the match, Viola certainly finished as the third and the opponent Steaua as the fourth.

Masi injured in his knee (anterior cruciate ligament) in May 2010.

He was an overage player for the Primavera under-20 team in 2010–11 season. That season he played 15 times in the youth league group stage, shared the role with Andrea Bagnai. Moreover, Michele Camporese who promoted to the first team, occasionally played the big match for the youth team, squeezing the opportunity of other players including Masi. Masi finished as the runner-up of 2011 Torneo di Viareggio. He played the final as a substitute of Alessio Fatticcioni. In March, he won Coppa Italia Primavera. He played both legs of the finals as centre-back, partnered with Camporese. However, Masi did not play in the playoffs round in the youth league, to comply with overage quota (instead one of the quotas given to Andrea Seculin) and gave chance to younger players.

Masi also played once in 2010–11 Coppa Italia.

=== Bari ===
In July 2011 he left for Serie B club Bari in co-ownership deal for a peppercorn of €500. He made his Serie B debut in the first round, as a starting right-back. On 23 June 2012 he is purchased entirely by Bari.

=== Lupa Roma ===
On 15 January 2015 he was signed by Lupa Roma.

== International career ==
Masi capped for Azzurrini since under-16 level. He received his first call-up to 2005 Torneo Giovanile di Natale In December. Masi also selected to Lazio region U15 representative team in 2005.

He finished as the runner-up of a youth tournament in Montaigu, Vendée, France. He only started once in 2007 UEFA European Under-17 Football Championship qualification. However, in the elite round he started all three games. The team was eliminated by Ukraine in the third game.

He received call-up to U-18 training camp in 2007.

Masi was promoted to U-20 team directly in August 2008, a feeder team of U21, for 2008–09 Four Nations Tournament. However, he did not enter the squad for 2009 UEFA European Under-19 Football Championship qualification in Moldova. He also received another U-20 call-up in December 2009 and again in May 2010, both for 2009–10 Four Nations Tournament. After the injury, he returned to the feeder team of U-21 in March 2011, for 2010–11 Four Nations Tournament, but again did not play.

In 2011–12 season, Masi was too old for U-20 team. Instead, he received a call-up from Italy under-21 Serie B representative team, winning Serbian First League selection. He also played the next match against Russian First League Selection .

Masi was part of Italy squad at 2013 and 2015 Summer Universiade (which he played the first and last match).
