= Italy at the 2017 Summer Universiade =

- IOC code: ITA
- NOC: Italian National Olympic Committee
- Website: www.coni.it(in Italian)

in Taipei, Taiwan
- Competitors: 193 in 13 sports
- Medals Ranked 8th: Gold 9 Silver 6 Bronze 17 Total 32

Summer Universiade appearances (overview)
- 1959; 1961; 1963; 1965; 1967; 1970; 1973; 1975; 1977; 1979; 1981; 1983; 1985; 1987; 1989; 1991; 1993; 1995; 1997; 1999; 2001; 2003; 2005; 2007; 2009; 2011; 2013; 2015; 2017; 2019; 2021; 2025; 2027

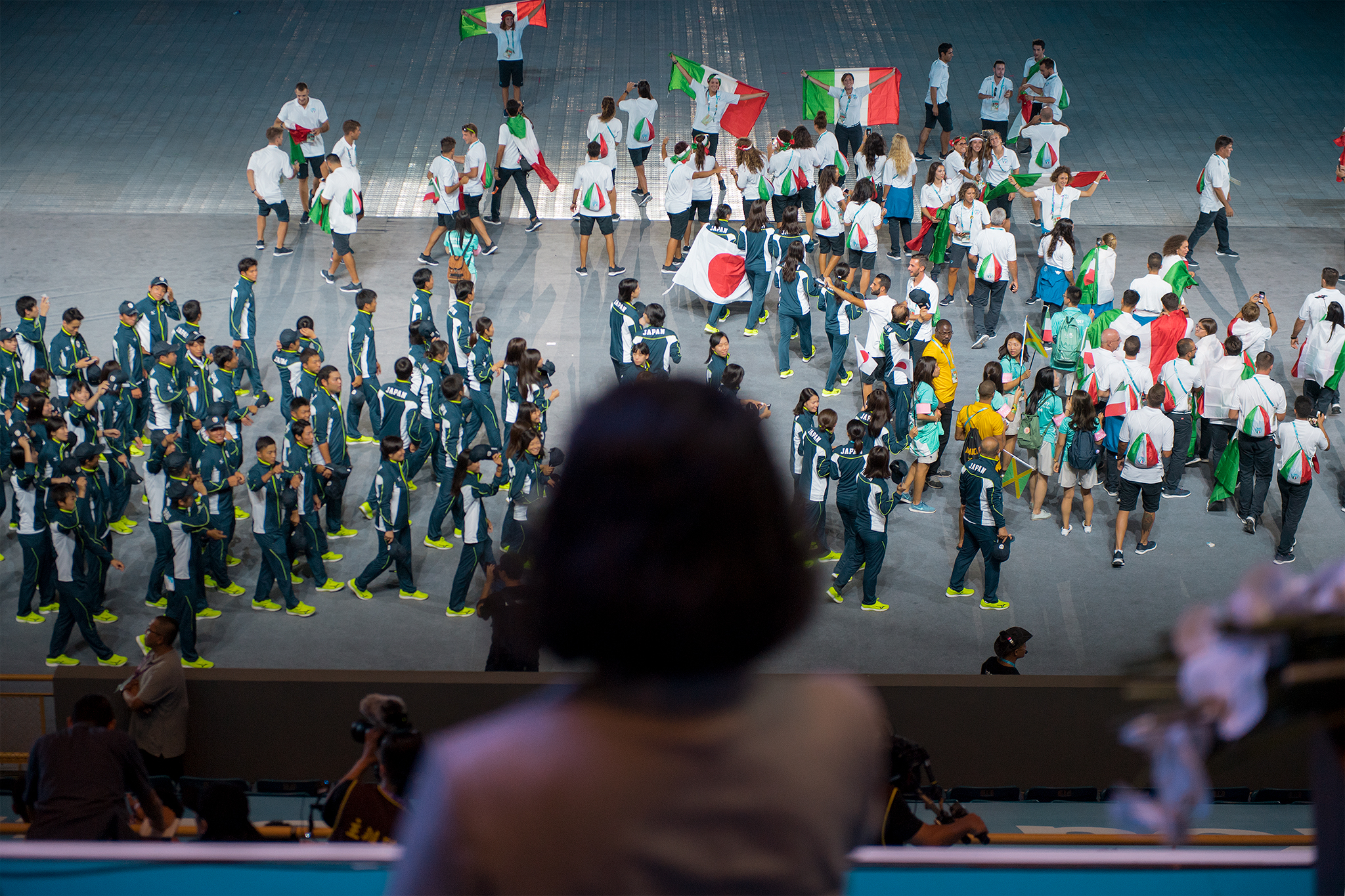
Italian athletes during Opening ceremony

Italy participated at the 2017 Summer Universiade in Taipei, Taiwan.

With Naples being the host city of the 2019 Summer Universiade, an Italian segment was performed at the closing ceremony.

== Medal summary ==
=== Medal by sports ===
Medals by sport
Sport	1st place, gold medalist(s)	2nd place, silver medalist(s)	3rd place, bronze medalist(s)	Total
Athletics	2	2	2	6
Diving	0	0	3	3
Fencing	1	0	6	7
Judo	1	0	2	3
Roller Sports	0	0	1	1
Swimming	5	4	1	10
Taekwondo	0	0	1	1
Waterpolo	0	0	1	1
Total	9	6	17	32

== Medalists ==
Athlete	Sport	Event	Medal
Ayomide Folorunso	Athletics	Women's 400m Hurdles	GOLD
Irene Siragusa	Athletics	Women's 100m	SILVER
Irene Siragusa	Athletics	Women's 200m	GOLD
Anna Bongiorni	Athletics	Women's 200m	BRONZE
Marco Fassinotti	Athletics	Men's High Jump	SILVER
Claudio Stecchi	Athletics	Men's Pole Vault	BRONZE
Giovanni Tocci	Diving	Men's 3m Springboard	BRONZE
Italy	Diving	Mixed Synchronised 3m Springboard	BRONZE
Italy	Diving	Men's Synchronised 3m Springboard	BRONZE
Italy	Fencing	Women's Team Foil	GOLD
Alessandro Paroli	Fencing	Men's Foil Individual	BRONZE
Roberta Marzani	Fencing	Women's Epee Individual	BRONZE
Beatrice Monaco	Fencing	Women's Foil Individual	BRONZE
Chiara Mormile	Fencing	Women's Sabre Individual	BRONZE
Italy	Fencing	Men's Sabre Team	BRONZE
Italy	Fencing	Men's Foil Team	BRONZE
Valeria Ferrari	Judo	Women's -78 kg	GOLD
Giulia Pierucci	Judo	Women's -52 kg	BRONZE
Carola Paissoni	Judo	Women's -70 kg	BRONZE
Gregorio Paltrinieri	Swimming	Men's 1500m Freestyle	GOLD
Gregorio Paltrinieri	Swimming	Men's 800m Freestyle	GOLD
Gregorio Paltrinieri	Swimming	Men's Marathon Swimming (10km)	GOLD
Simona Quadarella	Swimming	Women's 1500m Freestyle	GOLD
Simona Quadarella	Swimming	Women's 800m Freestylee	GOLD
Italy	Swimming	Men's 4x100m Freestyle Relay	SILVER
Elena Di Liddo	Swimming	Women's 50m Butterfly	SILVER
Elena Di Liddo	Swimming	Women's 100m Butterfly	SILVER
Giulia Gabrielleschi	Swimming	Women's Marathon Swimming (10km)	SILVER
Italy	Swimming	Women's 4x100m Medley Relay	BRONZE
Daniela Rotolo	Taekwondo	Women's -62kg	BRONZE
Giuseppe Bramante	Roller Sports	Men's Marathon	BRONZE
Italy	Waterpolo	Men's Waterpolo	BRONZE

== See also ==
- Italy at the Universiade
