= Italy at the 1993 Summer Universiade =

- IOC code: ITA
- NOC: Italian National Olympic Committee

in Buffalo
- Medals Ranked 9th: Gold 5 Silver 9 Bronze 11 Total 25

Summer Universiade appearances (overview)
- 1959; 1961; 1963; 1965; 1967; 1970; 1973; 1975; 1977; 1979; 1981; 1983; 1985; 1987; 1989; 1991; 1993; 1995; 1997; 1999; 2001; 2003; 2005; 2007; 2009; 2011; 2013; 2015; 2017; 2019; 2021; 2025; 2027

Italy competed at the 1993 Summer Universiade in Buffalo, United States of America and won 25 medals.

== Medals ==
Sport	1st place, gold medalist(s)	2nd place, silver medalist(s)	3rd place, bronze medalist(s)	Tot.
Fencing	3	2	5	10
Gymnastics	2	1	1	4
Athletics	0	3	1	4
Swimming	0	2	1	3
Rowing	0	1	2	3
Water polo	0	0	1	1
Total	5	9	11	25

== Details ==
Sport	1st place, gold medalist(s)	2nd place, silver medalist(s)	3rd place, bronze medalist(s)
Fencing	Giovanni Sirovich (sabre)	Anna Giacometti (foil)	Alessandro Puccini (foil)
Fencing	Men's Team Sabre	Men's Team Foil	Men's Team Épée
Fencing	Women's Team Foil		Diana Bianchedi (foil)
Fencing			Giovanna Trillini (foil)
Fencing			Corinne Panzeri (épée)
Gymnastics	Jury Chechi (rings)	Jury Chechi (all-around)	Ruggero Rossato (rings)
Gymnastics	Men's Team		
Athletics		Alberto Giacchetto (pole vault)	Vincenzo Modica (10000 metres)
Athletics		Paolo Dal Soglio (shot put)	
Athletics		Franca Fiacconi (marathon)	
Swimming		Marco Formentini (1500 m freestyle)	Emanuele Merisi (100 m backstroke)
Swimming		Emanuele Merisi (200 m backstroke)	
Rowing		Men's Lightweight Double Sculls	Women's Lightweight Single Sculls
Rowing			Men's Coxless Pair-Oared Shells
Water polo			Men's National Team
