= Italy at the 1973 Summer Universiade =

- IOC code: ITA
- NOC: Italian National Olympic Committee

in Moscow
- Medals Ranked 9th: Gold 2 Silver 0 Bronze 6 Total 8

Summer Universiade appearances (overview)
- 1959; 1961; 1963; 1965; 1967; 1970; 1973; 1975; 1977; 1979; 1981; 1983; 1985; 1987; 1989; 1991; 1993; 1995; 1997; 1999; 2001; 2003; 2005; 2007; 2009; 2011; 2013; 2015; 2017; 2019; 2021; 2025; 2027

Italy competed at the 1973 Summer Universiade in Moscow, Soviet Union and won 8 medals.

== Medals ==
| Sport | 1st place, gold medalist(s) | 2nd place, silver medalist(s) | 3rd place, bronze medalist(s) | Tot. |
|---|---|---|---|---|
| Athletics | 2 | 0 | 4 | 6 |
| Fencing | 0 | 0 | 2 | 2 |
| Total | 2 | 0 | 6 | 8 |

== Details ==
| Sport | 1st place, gold medalist(s) | 2nd place, silver medalist(s) | 3rd place, bronze medalist(s) |
|---|---|---|---|
| Athletics | Pietro Mennea (200 m) | | Pietro Mennea (100 m) |
| Athletics | Paola Pigni (1500 m) | | Enzo Del Forno (high jump) |
| Athletics | Paola Pigni (1500 m) | | Luigi Benedetti; Vincenzo Guerini; Sergio Morselli; Pietro Mennea (Men's 4x100 metres relay) |
| Athletics | Paola Pigni (1500 m) | | Sara Simeoni |
| Fencing | | | Tommaso Montano (sabre) |
| Fencing | | | Men's Team Sabre |
