= Diving at the 2018 Asian Games – Men's 1 metre springboard =

Diving competition

Men's 1 metre springboard at the 2018 Asian Games
- Venue: Gelora Bung Karno Aquatic Stadium
- Date: 30 August 2018
- Competitors: 12 from 8 nations

Medalists
| gold medal | Peng Jianfeng | China |
| silver medal | Liu Chengming | China |
| bronze medal | Woo Ha-ram | South Korea |

The men's 1 metre springboard competition at the 2018 Asian Games took place on 30 August 2018 at the Gelora Bung Karno Aquatic Stadium.

== Schedule ==
All times are Western Indonesia Time (UTC+07:00)

| Date | Time | Event |
|---|---|---|
| Thursday, 30 August 2018 | 14:20 | Preliminary |
| Thursday, 30 August 2018 | 20:50 | Final |

== Results ==
=== Preliminary ===
| Rank | Athlete | Dive | | | | | | Total |
| Rank | Athlete | 1 | 2 | 3 | 4 | 5 | 6 | Total |
|---|---|---|---|---|---|---|---|---|
| 1 | Liu Chengming (CHN) | 73.50 | 72.00 | 67.50 | 74.25 | 73.60 | 78.20 | 439.05 |
| 2 | Peng Jianfeng (CHN) | 76.50 | 70.50 | 79.50 | 71.40 | 62.70 | 78.40 | 439.00 |
| 3 | Woo Ha-ram (KOR) | 66.30 | 77.55 | 67.20 | 72.00 | 67.50 | 55.50 | 406.05 |
| 4 | Kim Yeong-nam (KOR) | 68.00 | 59.40 | 64.00 | 63.00 | 73.60 | 66.00 | 394.00 |
| 5 | Syafiq Puteh (MAS) | 62.40 | 57.35 | 55.50 | 58.50 | 63.00 | 64.50 | 361.25 |
| 6 | Ahmad Amsyar Azman (MAS) | 55.50 | 45.90 | 58.50 | 46.20 | 67.20 | 70.40 | 343.70 |
| 7 | Ramananda Sharma (IND) | 45.50 | 54.00 | 37.50 | 62.00 | 66.00 | 62.40 | 327.40 |
| 8 | Aldinsyah Putra Rafi (INA) | 54.60 | 63.55 | 51.00 | 59.20 | 57.00 | 36.00 | 321.35 |
| 9 | Mojtaba Valipour (IRI) | 53.30 | 42.00 | 49.50 | 54.00 | 46.50 | 57.60 | 302.90 |
| 10 | Tri Anggoro Priambodo (INA) | 59.80 | 36.00 | 49.60 | 41.60 | 34.50 | 34.50 | 256.00 |
| 11 | Abdulaziz Balghaith (QAT) | 43.20 | 19.50 | 35.65 | 43.50 | 39.00 | 37.50 | 218.35 |
| 12 | Yuen Pak Yin (HKG) | 43.20 | 33.80 | 31.05 | 21.60 | 39.90 | 35.20 | 204.75 |

=== Final ===
| Rank | Athlete | Dive | | | | | | Total |
| Rank | Athlete | 1 | 2 | 3 | 4 | 5 | 6 | Total |
|---|---|---|---|---|---|---|---|---|
| 1st place, gold medalist(s) | Peng Jianfeng (CHN) | 76.50 | 76.50 | 76.50 | 81.60 | 74.25 | 76.80 | 462.15 |
| 2nd place, silver medalist(s) | Liu Chengming (CHN) | 79.50 | 72.00 | 67.50 | 70.95 | 80.00 | 62.90 | 432.85 |
| 3rd place, bronze medalist(s) | Woo Ha-ram (KOR) | 66.30 | 59.40 | 60.80 | 67.20 | 64.50 | 64.50 | 382.70 |
| 4 | Ahmad Amsyar Azman (MAS) | 54.00 | 61.20 | 58.50 | 56.10 | 62.40 | 70.40 | 362.60 |
| 5 | Kim Yeong-nam (KOR) | 69.70 | 54.45 | 59.20 | 58.50 | 41.60 | 69.00 | 352.45 |
| 6 | Ramananda Sharma (IND) | 55.90 | 48.00 | 57.00 | 49.60 | 69.30 | 65.60 | 345.40 |
| 7 | Syafiq Puteh (MAS) | 54.60 | 65.10 | 58.50 | 52.50 | 42.00 | 61.50 | 334.20 |
| 8 | Mojtaba Valipour (IRI) | 55.90 | 51.00 | 42.00 | 49.50 | 55.80 | 54.40 | 308.60 |
| 9 | Aldinsyah Putra Rafi (INA) | 42.90 | 63.55 | 54.00 | 44.80 | 34.50 | 39.00 | 278.75 |
| 10 | Tri Anggoro Priambodo (INA) | 48.10 | 49.50 | 51.15 | 48.00 | 15.00 | 43.70 | 255.45 |
| 11 | Abdulaziz Balghaith (QAT) | 39.60 | 39.00 | 44.95 | 31.50 | 36.00 | 40.00 | 231.05 |
| 12 | Yuen Pak Yin (HKG) | 44.40 | 39.00 | 27.60 | 24.00 | 36.75 | 30.80 | 202.55 |
