= Italy at the 1970 Summer Universiade =

- IOC code: ITA
- NOC: Italian National Olympic Committee

in Turin
- Medals Ranked 4th: Gold 4 Silver 4 Bronze 6 Total 14

Summer Universiade appearances (overview)
- 1959; 1961; 1963; 1965; 1967; 1970; 1973; 1975; 1977; 1979; 1981; 1983; 1985; 1987; 1989; 1991; 1993; 1995; 1997; 1999; 2001; 2003; 2005; 2007; 2009; 2011; 2013; 2015; 2017; 2019; 2021; 2025; 2027

Italy competed at the 1970 Summer Universiade in Turin, Italy and won 14 medals.

== Medals ==
| Sport | 1st place, gold medalist(s) | 2nd place, silver medalist(s) | 3rd place, bronze medalist(s) | Tot. |
|---|---|---|---|---|
| Diving | 2 | 0 | 0 | 2 |
| Athletics | 1 | 1 | 4 | 6 |
| Volleyball | 1 | 0 | 0 | 1 |
| Fencing | 0 | 2 | 1 | 3 |
| Water polo | 1 | 0 | 0 | 1 |
| Tennis | 0 | 0 | 1 | 1 |
| Total | 4 | 4 | 6 | 14 |

== Details ==
| Sport | 1st place, gold medalist(s) | 2nd place, silver medalist(s) | 3rd place, bronze medalist(s) |
|---|---|---|---|
| Diving | Klaus Dibiasi (springboard) | | |
| Diving | Klaus Dibiasi (platform) | | |
| Athletics | Franco Arese (1500 m) | Erminio Azzaro (high jump) | Gianni Del Buono (1500 m) |
| Athletics | | | Giuseppe Cindolo (5000 m) |
| Athletics | | | Sergio Liani (100 m hs) |
| Athletics | | | Silvano Simeon (discud throw) |
| Volleyball | Men's National Team | | |
| Fencing | | Nicola Granieri (epee) | Men's Team Sabre |
| Fencing | | Michele Maffei (sabre) | |
| Water polo | | Men's National Team | |
| Tennis | | | Franco Bartoni (single) |
