= Diving at the 2019 Summer Universiade =

Diving at the XXX Summer Universiade
- Venue: Mostra d'Oltremare Swimming Pool
- Dates: 2–8 July

Diving was contested at the 2019 Summer Universiade from 2 to 8 July 2019 at the Mostra d'Oltremare diving pool in Naples.

== Medal summary ==
=== Men's events ===
Event	Gold	Silver	Bronze
1 metre springboard	Liu Chengming; China	Frithjof Seidel; Germany	Gabriele Auber; Italy
3 metre springboard	Liu Chengming; China	Yi Jae-gyeong; South Korea	Ilia Molchanov; Russia
10 metre platform	Diego Balleza; Mexico	Huang Bowen; China	Laurent Gosselin-Paradis; Canada
Synchronized 3 metre springboard	China (CHN); Hu Zijie; Li Pingan	Russia (RUS); Ilia Molchanov; Nikita Nikolaev	Italy (ITA); Andrea Cosoli; Francesco Porco
Synchronized 10 metre platform	China (CHN); Cao Lizhi; Huang Zigan	Mexico (MEX); Diego Balleza; Andrés Villarreal	Canada (CAN); Laurent Gosselin-Paradis; Ethan Pitman
Team classification	China (CHN)	Mexico (MEX)	Russia (RUS)

=== Women's events ===
Event	Gold	Silver	Bronze
1 metre springboard	Song Shoulin; China	Wu Chunting; China	Daria Lenz; United States
3 metre springboard	Wu Chunting; China	Dolores Hernández; Mexico	Karina Shkliar; Russia
10 metre platform	Alejandra Estrella; Mexico	Cho Eun-bi; South Korea	Gemma McArthur; Great Britain
Synchronized 3 metre springboard	Mexico (MEX); Dolores Hernández; Carolina Mendoza	China (CHN); Leng Minghong; Shen Yi	United States (USA); Daria Lenz; Carolina Sculti
Synchronized 10 metre platform	China (CHN); Jiao Jingjing; Wu Jiao	Mexico (MEX); Alejandra Estrella; Daniela Zambrano	South Korea (KOR); Cho Eun-bi; Moon Na-yun
Team classification	China (CHN)	Mexico (MEX)	South Korea (KOR)

=== Mixed ===
Event	Gold	Silver	Bronze
Synchronized 3 metre springboard	China (CHN); Hu Zijie; Wu Chunting	Russia (RUS); Egor Lapin; Evgeniia Selezneva	Mexico (MEX); Adán Zúñiga; Carolina Mendoza
Synchronized 10 metre platform	Mexico (MEX); Diego Balleza; Alejandra Estrella	China (CHN); Huang Zigan; Jiao Jingjing	Russia (RUS); Ilia Smirnov; Daria Selvanovskaia
Mixed team	China (CHN); Huang Bowen; Jiao Jingjing	Mexico (MEX); Adán Zúñiga; Alejandra Estrella	South Korea (KOR); Yi Jae-gyeong; Cho Eun-bi

=== Medal table ===
* Host nation (Italy)

Rank	Nation	Gold	Silver	Bronze	Total
1	China	11	4	0	15
2	Mexico	4	6	1	11
3	Russia	0	2	4	6
4	South Korea	0	2	3	5
5	Germany	0	1	0	1
6	Canada	0	0	2	2
6	Italy*	0	0	2	2
6	United States	0	0	2	2
9	Great Britain	0	0	1	1
Totals (9 entries)		15	15	15	45
