= Italy at the 1989 Summer Universiade =

- IOC code: ITA
- NOC: Italian National Olympic Committee

in Duisburg
- Medals Ranked 4th: Gold 8 Silver 3 Bronze 5 Total 16

Summer Universiade appearances (overview)
- 1959; 1961; 1963; 1965; 1967; 1970; 1973; 1975; 1977; 1979; 1981; 1983; 1985; 1987; 1989; 1991; 1993; 1995; 1997; 1999; 2001; 2003; 2005; 2007; 2009; 2011; 2013; 2015; 2017; 2019; 2021; 2025; 2027

Italy competed at the 1989 Summer Universiade in Duisburg, West Germany and won 30 medals.

== Medals ==
| Sport | 1st place, gold medalist(s) | 2nd place, silver medalist(s) | 3rd place, bronze medalist(s) | Tot. |
|---|---|---|---|---|
| Fencing | 4 | 2 | 4 | 1 |
| Athletics | 3 | 0 | 1 | 4 |
| Rowing | 1 | 1 | 0 | 2 |
| Total | 8 | 3 | 5 | 16 |

== Details ==
| Sport | 1st place, gold medalist(s) | 2nd place, silver medalist(s) | 3rd place, bronze medalist(s) |
|---|---|---|---|
| Fencing | Diana Bianchedi (foil) | Maurizio Randazzo (épée) | Stefano Cerioni (foil) |
| Fencing | Lucia Traversa (foil) | Tonhi Terenzi (sabre) | Giovanna Trillini (foil) |
| Fencing | Men's Team Épée | | Men's Team Foil |
| Fencing | Women's Team Foil | | Men's Team Sabre |
| Athletics | Walter Arena (20 km walk) | | Irmgard Trojer (400 metres hurdles) |
| Athletics | Stefano Mei (5000 m) | | |
| Athletics | Ileana Salvador (5 km walk) | | |
| Rowing | Men's Eight-Oared Shells | Men's Double Sculls | |
