= Italy at the 1997 Summer Universiade =

- IOC code: ITA
- NOC: Italian National Olympic Committee

in Sicily
- Medals Ranked 6th: Gold 7 Silver 14 Bronze 10 Total 31

Summer Universiade appearances (overview)
- 1959; 1961; 1963; 1965; 1967; 1970; 1973; 1975; 1977; 1979; 1981; 1983; 1985; 1987; 1989; 1991; 1993; 1995; 1997; 1999; 2001; 2003; 2005; 2007; 2009; 2011; 2013; 2015; 2017; 2019; 2021; 2025; 2027

Italy competed at the 1997 Summer Universiade, as host nation, in Catania and won 32 medals.

== Medals ==
Sport	1st place, gold medalist(s)	2nd place, silver medalist(s)	3rd place, bronze medalist(s)	Tot.
Fencing	2	3	1	6
Swimming	1	5	3	9
Athletics	1	4	3	8
Gymnastics	1	1	1	3
Football	1	0	0	0
Water polo	1	0	0	1
Volleyball	0	1	0	1
Tennis	0	0	2	2
Total	7	14	10	31

== Details ==
Sport	1st place, gold medalist(s)	2nd place, silver medalist(s)	3rd place, bronze medalist(s)
Fencing	Valentina Vezzali (foil)	Anna Giacometti (foil)	Alessandro Puccini (foil)
Fencing	Men's Team Sabre	Women's Team Foil	Davide Burroni (épée)
Fencing		Luigi Tarantino (sabre)	
Swimming	Emanuele Merisi (200 mbackstroke)	Marco Formentini (1500 m freestyle)	Marco Formentini (800 m freestyle)
Swimming		Lorenzo Vismara (50 m freestyle)	Stefano Battistelli (400 m medley)
Swimming		Lorenzo Vismara (100 m freestyle)	Women's 4×200 m freestyle relay
Swimming		Men's 4×100 m medley relay	
Swimming		Women's 4×100 m freestyle relay	
Athletics	Simone Zanon (5000 metres)	Paolo Dal Soglio (shot put)	Rachid Berradi (10,000 metres)
Athletics		Lucilla Andreucci (10,000 metres)	Arturo Di Mezza (20 km walk)
Athletics		Agata Balsamo (half marathon)	Annarita Sidoti (10 km walk)
Athletics		Rossella Giordano (10 km walk)	
Gymnastics	Jury Chechi (rings)	Roberto Galli (rings)	Alberto Busnari (pommell horse)
Football	Men's National Team		
Water polo	Men's National Team		
Volleyball		Men's National Team	
Tennis			Massimo Calvelli; Lorenzo Pennisi (Men's doubles)
Tennis			Germana Di Natale (Single)
