= Italy at the 1977 Summer Universiade =

- IOC code: ITA
- NOC: Italian National Olympic Committee

in Sofia
- Medals Ranked 10th: Gold 1 Silver 3 Bronze 3 Total 7

Summer Universiade appearances (overview)
- 1959; 1961; 1963; 1965; 1967; 1970; 1973; 1975; 1977; 1979; 1981; 1983; 1985; 1987; 1989; 1991; 1993; 1995; 1997; 1999; 2001; 2003; 2005; 2007; 2009; 2011; 2013; 2015; 2017; 2019; 2021; 2025; 2027

Italy competed at the 1977 Summer Universiade in Sofia, Bulgaria and won 7 medals.

== Medals ==
Sport	1st place, gold medalist(s)	2nd place, silver medalist(s)	3rd place, bronze medalist(s)	Tot.
Athletics	1	2	0	3
Fencing	0	1	1	3
Swimming	0	0	1	1
Water polo	0	0	1	1
Total	1	3	3	7

== Details ==
Sport	1st place, gold medalist(s)	2nd place, silver medalist(s)	3rd place, bronze medalist(s)
Athletics	Sara Simeoni (high jump)	Franco Fava (10000 m)	
Athletics	Sara Simeoni (high jump)	Luciano Caravani; Stefano Curini; Pietro Farina; Stefano Rasori (Men's 4×100 metres relay)	
Fencing		Angelo Arcidiacono (sabre)	Men's Team Foil
Swimming			Giorgio Lalle (100 m breaststroke)
