= Italy at the 2011 Summer Universiade =

- IOC code: ITA
- NOC: Italian National Olympic Committee

in Shenzhen
- Competitors: 56 in 3 sports
- Medals Ranked 6th: Gold 12 Silver 5 Bronze 13 Total 30

Summer Universiade appearances (overview)
- 1959; 1961; 1963; 1965; 1967; 1970; 1973; 1975; 1977; 1979; 1981; 1983; 1985; 1987; 1989; 1991; 1993; 1995; 1997; 1999; 2001; 2003; 2005; 2007; 2009; 2011; 2013; 2015; 2017; 2019; 2021; 2025; 2027

Italy competed at the 2011 Summer Universiade in Shenzhen, China, and won 30 medals.

== Medals ==
Sport	1st place, gold medalist(s)	2nd place, silver medalist(s)	3rd place, bronze medalist(s)	Tot.
Shooting	7	0	2	2
Swimming	4	2	4	10
Fencing	1	2	2	5
Golf	0	1	1	2
Athletics	0	0	2	2
Artistic Gymnastics	0	0	1	1
Archery	0	0	1	1
Totale	12	5	13	30

== Details ==
Sport	1st place, gold medalist(s)	2nd place, silver medalist(s)	3rd place, bronze medalist(s)
Shooting	Niccolò Campriani (rifle 10 m)		Simone Lorenzo Prosperi (trap)
Shooting	Niccolò Campriani (rifle 50 m)		Men's Double Trap Team
Shooting	Men's Rifle 50 m Team		
Shooting	Petra Zublasing (rifle 10 m)		
Shooting	Giancarlo Tazza (skeet)		
Shooting	Marco Panizza (trap)		
Shooting	Men's Trap Team		
Swimming	Lucio Spadaro (50 m SL)	Rocco Potenza (800 m freestyle)	Sebastiano Ranfagni (100 m SL)
Swimming	Rocco Potenza (1500 m freestyle)	Paolo Facchinelli (50 m butterfly)	Mattia Pesce (50 m backstroke)
Swimming	Simone Ruffini (10 km)		Men's 4x100 medley
Swimming	Rachele Bruni (10 km)		Alice Franco (10 km)
Fencing	Martino Minuto (foil)	Men's Team Foil	Massimiliano Murolo (sabre)
Fencing		Men's Team Sabre	Raffaello Marzani (épée)
Golf		Men's Team	Andrea Bolognesi (single)
Athletics			Stefano La Rosa (5000 m)
Athletics			Lorenzo Povegliano (hammer throw)
Gymnastics			Giulia Bianchi; Emanuele Pagliuca (aerobics)
Archery			Anastasia Anastasio; Jacopo Polidori (Compound Team)
