= Italy at the 2013 Summer Universiade =

- IOC code: ITA
- NOC: Italian National Olympic Committee

in Kazan
- Medals Ranked 9th: Gold 6 Silver 17 Bronze 21 Total 44

Summer Universiade appearances (overview)
- 1959; 1961; 1963; 1965; 1967; 1970; 1973; 1975; 1977; 1979; 1981; 1983; 1985; 1987; 1989; 1991; 1993; 1995; 1997; 1999; 2001; 2003; 2005; 2007; 2009; 2011; 2013; 2015; 2017; 2019; 2021; 2025; 2027

Italy competed at the 2013 Summer Universiade in Kazan, Russia.

The team won 44 medals (5th place after Russia, Japan, China, Ukraine) including 6 gold medals (9th place).

== Sports ==
=== Athletics ===
The FIDAL (Italian athletics federation) brought 18 athletes at the Summer Universiade in Kazan (7 men and 8 women).

=== Football ===
Head coach: (Italy) Valerio Bertotto

No.	Pos.	Player	Date of birth (age)	Club
1	GK	Nicola Modesti	9 May 1990 (aged 23)	(Italian Football Federation) Martina
2	DF	Matteo Bruscagin	3 August 1989 (aged 23)	(Italian Football Federation) Latina
3	DF	Gianmarco Carta	14 December 1991 (aged 21)	(Italian Football Federation) Aprilia
4	DF	Federico Masi	10 October 1990 (aged 22)	(Italian Football Federation) Venezia
5	DF	Andrea Brighi	29 July 1992 (aged 20)	(Italian Football Federation) Rimini
6	MF	Andrea Settembrini	10 December 1991 (aged 21)	(Italian Football Federation) Poggibonsi
7	FW	Andrea Parodi	13 August 1993 (aged 19)	(Italian Football Federation) Pavia
8	MF	Filippo Corti	20 May 1989 (aged 24)	(Italian Football Federation) Tritium
9	FW	Luca Miracoli	31 March 1992 (aged 21)	(Italian Football Federation) FeralpiSalò
10	MF	Lorenzo Degeri	13 October 1992 (aged 20)	(Italian Football Federation) Cremonese
11	FW	Manuel Ricci	25 April 1990 (aged 23)	(Italian Football Federation) Salernitana
12	GK	Marco Pavanello	11 November 1991 (aged 21)	(Italian Football Federation) Alessandria
13	DF	Paolo Rizzo	9 June 1992 (aged 21)	(Italian Football Federation) Fondi
14	DF	Alessandro Fabbri	11 March 1990 (aged 23)	(Italian Football Federation) Santarcangelo
15	FW	Manuel Muratori	18 August 1993 (aged 19)	(Italian Football Federation) Fano
16	MF	Andrea Burato	2 July 1990 (aged 23)	(Italian Football Federation) Treviso
17	MF	Fabio Marcotullio	11 June 1993 (aged 20)	(Italian Football Federation) L'Aquila
18	FW	Claudio Santini	12 February 1992 (aged 21)	(Italian Football Federation) Borgo a Buggiano
19	FW	Bernardo Masini	29 January 1992 (aged 21)	(Italian Football Federation) Giacomense
22	GK	Alberto Paleari	29 August 1992 (aged 20)	(Italian Football Federation) Tritium
