= Italy at the 1975 Summer Universiade =

- IOC code: ITA
- NOC: Italian National Olympic Committee

in Rome
- Medals Ranked 3rd: Gold 5 Silver 1 Bronze 1 Total 7

Summer Universiade appearances (overview)
- 1959; 1961; 1963; 1965; 1967; 1970; 1973; 1975; 1977; 1979; 1981; 1983; 1985; 1987; 1989; 1991; 1993; 1995; 1997; 1999; 2001; 2003; 2005; 2007; 2009; 2011; 2013; 2015; 2017; 2019; 2021; 2025; 2027

Italy competed at the 1975 Summer Universiade in Rome, Italy and won 7 medals in the only sport disputed in that edition of the Summer Universiade, the Athletics.

== Medals ==
| Sport | 1st place, gold medalist(s) | 2nd place, silver medalist(s) | 3rd place, bronze medalist(s) | Tot. |
|---|---|---|---|---|
| Athletics | 5 | 1 | 1 | 7 |
| Total | 5 | 1 | 1 | 7 |

== Details ==
| Sport | 1st place, gold medalist(s) | 2nd place, silver medalist(s) | 3rd place, bronze medalist(s) |
|---|---|---|---|
Athletics
| Athletics | Pietro Mennea (100 m) | Sara Simeoni (high jump) | Renato Dionisi (pole vault) |
| Athletics | Pietro Mennea (200 m) | Sara Simeoni (high jump) | Renato Dionisi (pole vault) |
| Athletics | Franco Fava (5000 m) | Sara Simeoni (high jump) | Renato Dionisi (pole vault) |
| Athletics | Franco Fava (10000 m) | Sara Simeoni (high jump) | Renato Dionisi (pole vault) |
| Athletics | Enzo Del Forno (high jump) | Sara Simeoni (high jump) | Renato Dionisi (pole vault) |
