= Italy at the 1979 Summer Universiade =

- IOC code: ITA
- NOC: Italian National Olympic Committee

in Mexico City
- Medals Ranked 7th: Gold 3 Silver 2 Bronze 5 Total 10

Summer Universiade appearances (overview)
- 1959; 1961; 1963; 1965; 1967; 1970; 1973; 1975; 1977; 1979; 1981; 1983; 1985; 1987; 1989; 1991; 1993; 1995; 1997; 1999; 2001; 2003; 2005; 2007; 2009; 2011; 2013; 2015; 2017; 2019; 2021; 2025; 2027

Italy competed at the 1979 Summer Universiade in Mexico City, Mexico and won 10 medals.

In this edition Pietro Mennea established the world record of the 200 metres, holder till 1996, when Michael Johnson broke it.

== Medals ==
Sport	1st place, gold medalist(s)	2nd place, silver medalist(s)	3rd place, bronze medalist(s)	Tot.
Athletics	2	1	4	7
Fencing	0	1	0	1
Swimming	1	0	1	2
Total	3	2	5	10

== Details ==
Sport	1st place, gold medalist(s)	2nd place, silver medalist(s)	3rd place, bronze medalist(s)
Athletics
Athletics	Pietro Mennea (200 m)	Mariano Scartezzini (3000 m steeplechase)	Michele Cina (3000 m steeplechase)
Athletics	Luciano Caravani; Giovanni Grazioli; Gianfranco Lazzer; Pietro Mennea (Men's 4×100 metres relay)	Mariano Scartezzini (3000 m steeplechase)	Roberto Mazzucato (triple jump)
Athletics	Luciano Caravani; Giovanni Grazioli; Gianfranco Lazzer; Pietro Mennea (Men's 4×100 metres relay)	Mariano Scartezzini (3000 m steeplechase)	Flavio Borghi; Alfonso Di Guida; Stefano Malinverni; Roberto Tozzi (Men's 4×400 metres relay)
Athletics	Luciano Caravani; Giovanni Grazioli; Gianfranco Lazzer; Pietro Mennea (Men's 4×100 metres relay)	Mariano Scartezzini (3000 m steeplechase)	Sara Simeoni (high jump)
Swimming	Marcello Guarducci (100 m freestyle)		Men's 4×200 metres freestyle
Fencing		Squadra fioretto maschile	
