= Italy at the 2015 Summer Universiade =

- IOC code: ITA
- NOC: Italian National Olympic Committee
- Website: https://www.2017.taipei

in Gwangju
- Competitors: 205 in 12 sports
- Medals Ranked 7th: Gold 11 Silver 15 Bronze 17 Total 43

Summer Universiade appearances (overview)
- 1959; 1961; 1963; 1965; 1967; 1970; 1973; 1975; 1977; 1979; 1981; 1983; 1985; 1987; 1989; 1991; 1993; 1995; 1997; 1999; 2001; 2003; 2005; 2007; 2009; 2011; 2013; 2015; 2017; 2019; 2021; 2025; 2027

Italy participated at the 2015 Summer Universiade in Gwangju, South Korea.

== Medal summary ==
=== Medal by sports ===
Medals by sport
Sport	1st place, gold medalist(s)	2nd place, silver medalist(s)	3rd place, bronze medalist(s)	Total
Archery	0	0	1	1
Athletics	0	0	1	1
Fencing	1	0	3	4
Football	1	0	0	1
Judo	0	0	1	1
Rowing	1	2	3	6
Shooting	5	3	2	10
Swimming	3	9	6	18
Water polo	0	1	0	1
Total	11	15	17	43

=== Medalists ===
Medal	Name	Sport	Event	Date
Gold	Silvana Maria Stanco	Shooting	Women's Trap	5 July
Gold	Silvana Maria Stanco; Federica Caporsucio; Valeria Raffaelli	Shooting	Women's Trap Team	5 July
Gold	Valerio Grazini	Shooting	Men's Trap	6 July
Gold	Martina Rita Caramignoli	Swimming	Women's 1500m Freestyle	6 July
Gold	Simone Molteni; Matteo Mulas	Rowing	Men's Lightweight Double Sculls	7 July
Gold	Beatrice Monaco; Camilla Mancini; Francesca Palumbo; Olga Rachele Calissi	Fencing	Women's Foil Team	8 July
Gold	Andrea Vescovi	Shooting	Men's Double Trap	10 July
Gold	Alessandro Chianese; Andrea Vescovi; Ignazio Maria Tronca	Shooting	Men's Double Trap Team	10 July
Gold	Carlotta Zofkova; Ilaria Scarcella; Elena Di Liddo; Laura Letrari	Swimming	Women's 4 × 100 m Medley Relay	10 July
Gold	Arianna Bridi	Swimming	Women's 10 km	11 July
Gold	Alberto Paleari; Daniel Cappelletti; Filippo Berra; Stefano Truzzi; Biagio Meccariello; Roberto Sabato; Luca Mora; Paolo Faragò; Tommaso Biasci; Leonardo Morosini; Jacopo Dezi; Nicolò Manfredini; Federico Masi; Paolo Regoli; Lorenzo Cerrai; Francesco Bergamini; Tommaso Maestrelli; Filippo Corti; Bernardo Masini; Luca Savelloni	Football	Men's Football	13 July
Silver	Federica Caporsucio	Shooting	Women's Trap	5 July
Silver	Christopher Ciccarese	Swimming	Men's 100m Backstroke	5 July
Silver	Simone Ferrarese; Federico Ustolin	Rowing	Men's Coxless Pairs	6 July
Silver	Valerio Grazini; Andrea Miotto; Diego Meoni	Shooting	Men's Trap Team	6 July
Silver	Simone Martini	Rowing	Men's Single Sculls	7 July
Silver	Stefano Pizzamiglio	Swimming	Men's 50m Backstroke	7 July
Silver	Elena Di Liddo	Swimming	Women's 100m Butterfly	8 July
Silver	Michael Palmieri; Giancarlo Tazza; Antonio Morandini	Shooting	Men's Skeet Team	9 July
Silver	Andrea Toniato	Swimming	Men's 50m Breaststroke	9 July
Silver	Piero Codia	Swimming	Men's 100m Butterfly	9 July
Silver	Martina Rita Caramignoli	Swimming	Women's 800m Freestyle	10 July
Silver	Alessia Polieri	Swimming	Women's 200m Butterfly	10 July
Silver	Matteo Furlan	Swimming	Men's 10 km	11 July
Silver	Ilaria Raimondi	Swimming	Women's 10 km	11 July
Silver	Paolo Oliva; Umberto Esposito; Luca Damonte; Francesco Coppoli; Luca Marziali; Gianluigi Foglio; Vincenzo Dolce; Alessandro Nora; Matteo Gitto; Cristiano Mirarchi; Lorenzo Bruni; Giacomo Lanzoni; Lorenzo Vespa	Water polo	Men	14 July
Bronze	Leonardo Affede	Fencing	Men's Sabre Individual	4 July
Bronze	Piero Codia	Swimming	Men's 50m Butterfly	5 July
Bronze	Matteo Piras	Judo	Men's -66 kg	6 July
Bronze	Guglielmo Carcano; Pietro Zileri Dal Verme; Luca Lovisolo; Matteo Borsini	Rowing	Men's Coxless Four	6 July
Bronze	Michele G. Quaranta; Federico Parma; Francesco Schisano; Vincenzo Serpico	Rowing	Men's Lightweight Coxless Four	6 July
Bronze	Eleonora Trivella; Valentina Rodini	Rowing	Women's Lightweight Double Sculls	6 July
Bronze	Luca Fanti; Andrea Leotta; Jacopo Polidori	Archery	Men's Compound Team	7 July
Bronze	Martina De Memme	Swimming	Women's 400m Freestyle	7 July
Bronze	Andrea Baroglio; Lorenzo Bruttini; Lorenzo Buzzi; Luca Ferraris	Fencing	Men's Épée Team	8 July
Bronze	Marco Belotti	Swimming	Men's 100m Freestyle	8 July
Bronze	Stefania Strumillo	Athletics	Women's Discus Throw	9 July
Bronze	Alessandro Paroli; Francesco Trani; Saverio Schiavone; Tobia Biondo	Fencing	Men's Foil Team	9 July
Bronze	Michael Palmieri	Shooting	Men's Skeet	9 July
Bronze	Martina De Memme	Swimming	Women's 200m Freestyle	9 July
Bronze	Alessandro Chianese	Shooting	Men's Double Trap	10 July
Bronze	Martina Carraro	Swimming	Women's 50m Breaststroke	10 July
Bronze	Mario Sanzullo	Swimming	Men's 10 km	11 July
