= Athletics at the 2019 Summer Universiade – Men's 400 metres =

The men's 400 metres event at the 2019 Summer Universiade was held on 8, 9 and 10 July at the Stadio San Paolo in Naples.

== Medalists ==
Gold	Silver	Bronze
Valente Mendoza; Mexico	Mikhail Litvin; Kazakhstan	Gardeo Isaacs; South Africa

== Results ==
=== Heats ===
Qualification: First 3 in each heat (Q) and next 3 fastest (q) qualified for the semifinals.

Rank	Heat	Name	Nationality	Time	Notes
1	5	Mikhail Litvin	Kazakhstan	46.39	Q, SB
1	6	Valente Mendoza	Mexico	46.39	Q
3	6	Danylo Danylenko	Ukraine	46.58	Q, PB
4	5	Mitsuki Kawauchi	Japan	46.67	Q
5	4	Cheikh Tidiane Diouf	Senegal	46.77	Q
6	5	Wiktor Suwara	Poland	46.93	Q
7	4	Mo Il-hwan	South Korea	46.94	Q
8	4	Cliffton Meshack	Botswana	47.03	Q
9	2	Gardeo Isaacs	South Africa	47.03	Q
10	2	Yang Lung-hsiang	Chinese Taipei	47.06	Q
11	4	Leon Tafirenyika	Zimbabwe	47.07	q, PB
12	7	Yu Chen-yi	Chinese Taipei	47.11	Q
13	5	Batuhan Altıntaş	Turkey	47.14	q
14	3	Šimon Bujna	Slovakia	47.24	Q, PB
15	3	Dariusz Kowaluk	Poland	47.25	Q
16	7	Isaiah Palmer	United States	47.41	Q
17	3	Frederic Mendy	Senegal	47.45	Q
18	3	Abdul Razak	Ghana	47.51	q, PB
19	1	Naoki Kitadani	Japan	47.55	Q
20	2	Mateo Ružić	Croatia	47.55	Q
21	1	Jon Seeliger	South Africa	47.81	Q
22	6	Wu Lei	China	47.82	Q
23	7	Phitchaya Sunthonthuam	Thailand	47.83	Q
24	3	Oleksiy Pozdnyakov	Ukraine	47.98	
25	1	Andrey Sokolov	Kazakhstan	48.06	Q, SB
26	7	Nattapong Kongkraphan	Thailand	48.14	
27	5	Tan Zong Yang	Singapore	48.16	
28	6	Anouar El Aoufi	Morocco	48.18	
29	1	Cristian Radu	Romania	48.21	
30	1	Rokas Pacevičius	Lithuania	48.22	SB
31	3	Caleb Kwemoi	Uganda	48.31	
32	1	Etiam Torgbenu	Ghana	48.37	
32	5	Yau Chung Cheah	Malaysia	48.37	SB
34	1	Zhu Zilong	China	48.73	
35	7	Kar Jun Kwong	Malaysia	48.89	
36	4	Williamson Oroma	Uganda	49.21	
37	7	Laknath Kavindu	Sri Lanka	49.22	
38	7	Mohammed Al-Suleimani	Oman	49.29	PB
39	4	Zhivko Stoyanov	Bulgaria	49.35	SB
40	2	Mohamad Merhe Mortada	Lebanon	49.46	
41	3	Lesedi Omondi	Botswana	49.47	
42	4	Cristin Esanu	Moldova	49.50	
43	4	Abdullah Al-Subaie	Saudi Arabia	49.59	
44	6	Sten Ütsmüts	Estonia	49.59	
45	6	Jahquez Durham	United States	49.62	
46	6	Usama Al-Gheilani	Oman	49.85	
47	2	Obrey Chabala	Zambia	50.09	
48	2	Lovrenc Valič	Slovenia	50.20	
49	3	Frederik Peschardt	Denmark	50.42	
50	1	Erick Arnold	Argentina	50.46	SB
51	6	Ishan Lahiru Olidurage	Sri Lanka	50.77	
52	2	Patrick Kahongo	Zambia	51.03	
53	5	Jean Bruno Kadda	Central African Republic	51.99	PB
54	5	Mahmoud El Daou	Lebanon	1:57.60	
	7	Roy Machingura	Zimbabwe	DNS	

=== Semifinals ===
Qualification: First 2 in each heat (Q) and next 2 fastest (q) qualified for the final.

Rank	Heat	Name	Nationality	Time	Notes
1	3	Valente Mendoza	Mexico	45.75	Q, PB
2	2	Mikhail Litvin	Kazakhstan	45.84	Q, SB
3	1	Gardeo Isaacs	South Africa	46.02	Q
4	1	Mitsuki Kawauchi	Japan	46.05	Q
5	3	Danylo Danylenko	Ukraine	46.09	Q, PB
6	1	Cheikh Tidiane Diouf	Senegal	46.31	q
7	1	Wiktor Suwara	Poland	46.40	q, PB
8	2	Naoki Kitadani	Japan	46.57	Q
9	2	Isaiah Palmer	United States	46.59	
10	2	Yang Lung-hsiang	Chinese Taipei	46.67	
11	3	Dariusz Kowaluk	Poland	46.77	
12	1	Cliffton Meshack	Botswana	46.80	SB
13	3	Yu Chen-yi	Chinese Taipei	46.86	
14	2	Šimon Bujna	Slovakia	46.94	PB
15	3	Frederic Mendy	Senegal	47.16	
16	3	Batuhan Altıntaş	Turkey	47.18	
17	2	Wu Lei	China	47.26	
18	1	Leon Tafirenyika	Zimbabwe	47.32	
19	3	Phitchaya Sunthonthuam	Thailand	47.38	
20	3	Jon Seeliger	South Africa	47.60	
21	2	Abdul Razak	Ghana	47.60	PB
22	1	Andrey Sokolov	Kazakhstan	47.97	SB
23	2	Mateo Ružić	Croatia	48.09	
	1	Mo Il-hwan	South Korea	DQ	163.3a

=== Final ===
Official Video

Rank	Lane	Name	Nationality	Time	Notes
1st place, gold medalist(s)	4	Valente Mendoza	Mexico	45.63	PB
2nd place, silver medalist(s)	3	Mikhail Litvin	Kazakhstan	45.77	SB
3rd place, bronze medalist(s)	6	Gardeo Isaacs	South Africa	45.89	PB
4	7	Danylo Danylenko	Ukraine	46.23	
5	1	Wiktor Suwara	Poland	46.36	PB
6	5	Mitsuki Kawauchi	Japan	46.62	
7	2	Cheikh Tidiane Diouf	Senegal	46.64	
8	8	Naoki Kitadani	Japan	46.69	
