= Diego Balleza =

Mexican diver (born 1994)

Personal information
- Full name: José Diego Balleza Isaias
- Born: 27 November 1994 (age 31) Monterrey, Mexico

Sport
- Country: Mexico
- Sport: Diving
- Event: 10 m platform synchro
Medal record
Men's diving
Representing Mexico
World Championships
Silver medal – second place	2023 Fukuoka	10 m mixed synchro
Bronze medal – third place	2019 Gwangju	10 m mixed synchro
Central American and Caribbean Games
Gold medal – first place	2023 San Salvador	10 m platform
Gold medal – first place	2023 San Salvador	10 m synchro mixed
Bronze medal – third place	2023 San Salvador	10 m synchro
Summer Universiade
Gold medal – first place	2019 Naples	10 m platform
Gold medal – first place	2019 Naples	10 m synchro mixed
Silver medal – second place	2019 Naples	Team
Silver medal – second place	2019 Naples	10 m synchro

José Diego Balleza Isaias (born 27 November 1994) is a Mexican diver.

He participated at the 2019 World Aquatics Championships, winning a medal.

In 2021, he competed in the men's synchronized 10 metre platform event at the 2020 Summer Olympics held in Tokyo, Japan.

Balleza began creating content for OnlyFans in 2023 in order to financially support himself and his family while he tried to qualify for the 2024 Summer Olympics. He failed to qualify.
