= Italy at the 2021 Summer World University Games =

- Flag of Italy
- IOC code: ITA

in Chengdu, China 28 July 2023 – 8 August 2023
- Competitors: 187 (94 men and 93 women)
- Medals Ranked 4th: Gold 17 Silver 18 Bronze 21 Total 56

Summer World University Games appearances
- 1959; 1961; 1963; 1965; 1967; 1970; 1973; 1975; 1977; 1979; 1981; 1983; 1985; 1987; 1989; 1991; 1993; 1995; 1997; 1999; 2001; 2003; 2005; 2007; 2009; 2011; 2013; 2015; 2017; 2019; 2021; 2025; 2027

Italy competed at the 2021 Summer World University Games in Chengdu, China held from 28 July to 8 August 2023.

== Medal summary ==
=== Medal by sports ===
| Rank | Sports | Gold | Silver | Bronze | Total |
|---|---|---|---|---|---|
| 1 | Swimming | 8 | 10 | 13 | 31 |
| 2 | Athletics | 3 | 0 | 0 | 3 |
| 3 | Fencing | 2 | 4 | 2 | 8 |
| 4 | Rowing | 2 | 3 | 2 | 7 |
| 5 | Water polo | 1 | 1 | 0 | 2 |
| 6 | Volleyball | 1 | 0 | 0 | 1 |
| 7 | Archery | 0 | 0 | 2 | 2 |
| 8 | Diving | 0 | 0 | 1 | 1 |
| 8 | Judo | 0 | 0 | 1 | 1 |
| Totals (9 entries) | | 17 | 18 | 21 | 56 |

=== Medalists ===
| Medal | Name | Sport | Event | Day |
|---|---|---|---|---|
| Gold | Matteo Lamberti | Swimming | Men's 400 m freestyle | 1 August |
| Gold | Simone Stefani | Swimming | Men's 100 m backstroke | 2 August |
| Gold | Serena Rossini | Fencing | Women's individual foi | 3 August |
| Gold | Alice Muraro | Athletics | Women's 400 metres hurdles | 3 August |
| Gold | Laura Pellicoro | Athletics | Women's 800 metres | 3 August |
| Gold | Ivan Giovannoni | Swimming | Men's 1500 m freestyle | 3 August |
| Gold | Simone Stefani | Swimming | Men's 50 m backstroke | 4 August |
| Gold | Anita Gastaldi | Swimming | Women's 200 m medley | 4 August |
| Gold | Alberto Arpino; Dario Cavaliere; Leonardo Dreossi; Giacomo Mignuzzi | Fencing | Men's team sabre | 5 August |
| Gold | Matteo Lamberti | Swimming | Men's 800 m freestyle | 5 August |
| Gold | Laura Pellicoro | Athletics | Women's 1500 metres | 6 August |
| Gold | Giovanni Borgonovo; Matteo Tonelli | Rowing | Lightweight men's double sculls | 6 August |
| Gold | Sara Borghi; Ilaria Corazza | Rowing | Lightweight women's double sculls | 6 August |
| Gold | Giovanni Izzoi | Swimming | Men's 50 m freestyle | 7 August |
| Gold | Antonella Crispino | Swimming | Women's 200 m butterfly | 7 August |
| Gold | Francesco Recine; Lorenzo Cortesia; Giulio Magalini; Damiano Catania; Nicola Salsi; Lorenzo Sala / Alberto Pol; Marco Vitelli; Paolo Porro; Tim Held; Edoardo Caneschi; Davide Gardini | Volleyball | Men's tournament | 7 August |
| Gold | Alessandro Vitale; Julien Lanfranco; Stefano Guerrato; Francesco Faraglia; Eduardo Campopiano; Federico Panerai; F. De Michelis / Pietro Faraglia; Davide Occhione; Mario Guid; Danjel Podgornik; Mario Del Basso; Nicolo' Da Rold | Water polo | Men's tournament | 8 August |
| Silver | Paola Biagioli; Giulia D'Innocenzo; Anita Gastaldi; Viola Scotto Di Carlo; Antonietta Cesarano | Swimming | Women's 4 × 100 m freestyle relay | 1 August |
| Silver | Sara Maria Kowalczyk | Fencing | Women's individual épée | 2 August |
| Silver | Michele Lamberti | Swimming | Men's 100 m backstroke | 2 August |
| Silver | Lorenzo Gargani | Swimming | Men's 50 m butterfly | 2 August |
| Silver | Elena Tangherlini | Fencing | Women's individual foi | 3 August |
| Silver | Alessandra Bozza; Sara Maria Kowalczyk; Roberta Marzani; Gaia Traditi | Fencing | Women's team épée | 5 August |
| Silver | Giovanni Carraro | Swimming | Men's 100 m freestyle | 5 August |
| Silver | Giovanni Izzo; Giovanni Carraro; Paola Biagioli; Anita Gastaldi; Nicolò Franceschi; Paolo Conte Bonin; Linda Caponi; Sonia Laquintana | Swimming | Mixed 4 × 100 m freestyle relay | 5 August |
| Silver | Giulia Amore; Anna Cristino; Serena Rossini; Elena Tangherlini | Fencing | Women's team foil | 6 August |
| Silver | Alessandro Timpanaro; Aleksander Gergolet; Gustavo Ferrio; Riccardo Mattana | Rowing | Men's four | 6 August |
| Silver | Elena Sali | Rowing | Lightweight women's single sculls | 6 August |
| Silver | Sara Borghi; Ilaria Corazza; Giovanni Borgonovo; Matteo Tonelli | Rowing | Mixed quadruple sculls | 6 August |
| Silver | Giovanni Caserta; Davide Marchello; Alessio Proietti Colonna; Matteo Lamberti | Swimming | Men's 4 × 200 m freestyle relay | 6 August |
| Silver | Ludovico Viberti | Swimming | Men's 50 m breaststroke | 6 August |
| Silver | Giulia D'Innocenzo | Swimming | Women's 200 m freestyle | 6 August |
| Silver | Pier Andrea Matteazzi | Swimming | Men's 400 m individual medley | 7 August |
| Silver | Simone Stefani; Alessandro Pinzuti; Christian Ferraro; Giovanni Izzo; Michele Lamberti; Ludovico Viberti; Michele Busa; Giovanni Carraro | Swimming | Men's 4 × 100 m medley relay | 7 August |
| Silver | Valeria Uccella; Francesca Sapienza; Anna Repetto; Sara Cordovani; Chiara Ranalli; Gaia Gagliardi; Letizia Nesti / Luna Di Claudio; Cecilia Nardini; Carlotta Meggiato; Elena Altamura; Sara Caros; Giorgia Galbani | Water polo | Women's tournament | 7 August |
| Bronze | Matteo Bilisari; Francesco Gregori; Matteo Borsani | Archery | Men's team recurve | 30 July |
| Bronze | Matteo Bilisari; Aiko Rolando | Archery | Mixed team recurve | 30 July |
| Bronze | Irene Pedrotti | Judo | Women's 70 kg | 30 July |
| Bronze | Giovanni Izzo; Nicolò Franceschi; Paolo Conte Bonin; Giovanni Carraro | Swimming | Men's 4 × 100 m freestyle relay | 1 August |
| Bronze | Viola Scotto Di Carlo | Swimming | Women's 50 m butterfly | 2 August |
| Bronze | Simone Stefani; Alessandro Pinzuti; Giulia D'Innocenzo; Viola Scotto Di Carlo; Lorenzo Glessi; Alessandro Fusco; Antonella Crispino; Antonietta Cesarano | Swimming | Mixed 4 × 100 m medley relay | 2 August |
| Bronze | Giovanni Caserta | Swimming | Men's 200 m freestyle | 3 August |
| Bronze | Elettra Neroni; Matilde Borello | Diving | Women's synchronized 3 metre springboard | 4 August |
| Bronze | Michele Lamberti | Swimming | Men's 50 m backstroke | 4 August |
| Bronze | Federica Toma | Swimming | Women's 100 m backstroke | 4 August |
| Bronze | Noemi Cesarano | Swimming | Women's 1500 m freestyle | 4 August |
| Bronze | Ivan Giovannoni | Swimming | Men's 800 m freestyle | 5 August |
| Bronze | Giulia D'Innocenzo | Swimming | Women's 100 m butterfly | 5 August |
| Bronze | Filippo Armaleo; Giulio Gaetani; Simone Mencarelli; Giacomo Paolini | Fencing | Men's team épée | 6 August |
| Bronze | Arianna Noseda; Maria Zerboni; Sofia Ascalone; Susanna Pedrola; Chiara Benvenuti; Gaia Colasante; Khadija Alajdi El Idrissi; Giorgia Borriello; Giulia Clerici | Rowing | Women's eight | 6 August |
| Bronze | Khadija Alajdi El Idrissi; Gaia Colasante | Rowing | Women's double sculls | 6 August |
| Bronze | Alessandro Pinzuti | Swimming | Men's 50 m breaststroke | 6 August |
| Bronze | Noemi Cesarano | Swimming | Women's 800 m freestyle | 6 August |
| Bronze | Davide Filippi; Francesco Ingargiola; Giulio Lombardi; Tommaso Martini | Fencing | Men's team foil | 7 August |
| Bronze | Antonietta Cesarano | Swimming | Women's 400 m freestyle | 6 August |
| Bronze | Federica Toma; Anita Gastaldi; Giulia D'Innocenzo; Viola Scotto di Carlo; Francesca Pasquino; Alessia Ferraguti; Anna Pirovano; Paola Biagioli | Swimming | Women's 4 × 100 m medley relay | 7 August |
