= Italy at the 2025 Summer World University Games =

- Flag of Italy
- IOC code: ITA
- National federation: Federazione Italiana dello Sport Universitario

in Rhine-Ruhr, Germany 16 July 2025 – 27 July 2025
- Competitors: 219 in 15 sports
- Flag bearers: Giulia Amore (fencing); Cosimo Bertini (fencing)
- Medals Ranked 5th: Gold 14 Silver 10 Bronze 19 Total 43

Summer World University Games appearances
- 1959; 1961; 1963; 1965; 1967; 1970; 1973; 1975; 1977; 1979; 1981; 1983; 1985; 1987; 1989; 1991; 1993; 1995; 1997; 1999; 2001; 2003; 2005; 2007; 2009; 2011; 2013; 2015; 2017; 2019; 2021; 2025; 2027

Italy competed at the 2025 Summer World University Games in Rhine-Ruhr, Germany held from 16–27 July 2025. Italy was represented by 219 athletes and took fifth place in the medal table. Giulia Amore and Cosimo Bertini became the flag-bearers.

== Medal summary ==
=== Medal by sports ===
Rank	Sports	Gold	Silver	Bronze	Total
1	Athletics	4	1	4	9
2	Swimming	3	4	6	13
3	Fencing	3	3	4	10
4	Rowing	2	2	1	5
5	Volleyball	1	0	1	2
5	Water polo	1	0	1	2
7	Taekwondo	0	0	1	1
7	Tennis	0	0	1	1
Totals (8 entries)		14	10	19	43

Source: rhineruhr2025.com

=== Medalists ===
Medal	Name	Sport	Event	Date
Gold	Aurora Grandis	Fencing	Women's foil individual	18 July
Gold	Simone Stefanì	Swimming	Men's 50m butterfly	18 July
Gold	Damiano Di Veroli	Fencing	Men's foil individual	19 July
Gold	Damiano Di Veroli; Giulio Lombardi; Tommaso Martini; Federico Pistorio	Fencing	Men's foil team	22 July
Gold	Gianmarco Sansone	Swimming	Men's 100m butterfly	22 July
Gold	Federico Rizzardi	Swimming	Men's 50m breaststroke	22 July
Gold	B Sartori; G Frosini; B Gardini; C Eze; O Omoruyi; M Armini / A Nardo; K Eckl; A Tanase; A Malual; R Morello; M Munarini	Volleyball	Women	23 July
Gold	Alice Muraro	Athletics	Women's 400m hurdles	24 July
Gold	Eloisa Coiro	Athletics	Women's 800m	24 July
Gold	Vittoria Fontana	Athletics	Women's 200m	24 July
Gold	R Valle; S Ballarini; P Faraglia; M Rocchino; D Occhione; L Giribaldi; A Gullotta / A Carnesecchi; A Condemi; A Balzarini; A Patchaliev; F Patti; N Da Rold	Water polo	Men	26 July
Gold	Andrea Cosi	Athletics	Men's 20km walk	27 July
Gold	Elena Sali; Sara Borghi	Rowing	Women's double sculls	27 July
Gold	Martina Fanfani; Tommaso Vianello; Lorenzo Baldo; Alice Ramella	Rowing	Mixed quadruple sculls	27 July
Silver	Elena Ferracuti; Carola Maccagno; Vittoria Siletti; Eleonora Orso	Fencing	Women's epee team	20 July
Silver	Cosimo Bertini; Edoardo Reale; Mattia Rea; Marco Mastrullo	Fencing	Men's sabre team	20 July
Silver	Ivan Giovannoni	Swimming	Men's 1500m freestyle	20 July
Silver	Irene Bertini; Aurora Grandis; Giulia Amore; Carlotta Ferrari	Fencing	Women's foil team	21 July
Silver	Tommaso Griffante	Swimming	Men's 800m freestyle	22 July
Silver	Giovanni Guatti	Swimming	Men's 50m freestyle	23 July
Silver	Pietro Ubertalli; Alessandro Fusco; Gianmarco Sansone; Lorenzo Actis Dato; Michele Busa; Giovanni Caserta; Flavio Mangiamele; Simone Stefanì	Swimming	Men's 4x100m medley relay	23 July
Silver	Asia Tavernini	Athletics	Women's high jump	26 July
Silver	Paolo Covini; Alessandro Gardino	Rowing	Men's pair	27 July
Silver	Ermanno Virgilio; Tommaso Rossi; Matteo Giorgetti; Francesco Graffione	Rowing	Men's four	27 July
Bronze	Giulia D'Innocenzo; Federica Toma; Viola Scotto Di Carlo; Agata Ambler	Swimming	Women's 4x100m freestyle relay	17 July
Bronze	Carlotta Ferrari	Fencing	Women's foil individual	18 July
Bronze	Lorenzo Gargani	Swimming	Men's 50m butterfly	18 July
Bronze	Viola Scotto Di Carlo	Swimming	Women's 50m butterfly	18 July
Bronze	Tommaso Martini	Fencing	Men's foil individual	19 July
Bronze	Elisa Bertagnin	Taekwondo	Women -46kg	19 July
Bronze	Davide Marchello	Swimming	Men's 1500m freestyle	20 July
Bronze	Fabrizio Cuomo; Simone Mencarelli; Fabrizio Di Marco; Nicolò Del Contrasto	Fencing	Men's epee team	21 July
Bronze	Michela Landi; Benedetta Fusetti; Claudia Rotili; Alessia Di Carlo	Fencing	Women's Sabre Team	22 July
Bronze	Giorgio Olivieri	Athletics	Men's hammer throw	23 July
Bronze	Alessandra Bonora	Athletics	Women's 400m	23 July
Bronze	Edoardo Scotti	Athletics	Men's 400m	23 July
Bronze	Paola Borrelli	Swimming	Women's 200m butterfly	23 July
Bronze	Federica Toma; Francesca Zucca; Viola Scotto Di Carlo; Agata Ambler; Giulia Caprai; Giulia D'innocenzo; Chiara Della Corte; Francesca Pasquino	Swimming	Women's 4x100m medley relay	23 July
Bronze	Fabio De Michele; Mariano Tammaro	Tennis	Men's doubles	23 July
Bronze	Riccardo Ferrara	Athletics	Men's shot put	24 July
Bronze	D Catania; G Magalini; T Guzzo; N Cianciotta; T Barotto; F Sani / A Fanizza; F Comparoni; M Orioli; A Truocchio; F Crosato; M Bonifante	Volleyball	Men	24 July
Bronze	G Acerbotti; G Zizza; F Morrone; M Misiti; V Sbruzzi; E De March; G Klatowski / F Colletta; L Papi; C Malluzzo; A Longo; B Cabona; L Celona	Water polo	Women	26 July
Bronze	Edoardo Rocchi; Andrea Pazzagli	Rowing	Men's double sculls	27 July
