= Andrés Villarreal =

Mexican diver

Andrés Villareal
Personal information
- Full name: Andres Isaac Villarreal Tudón
- Nationality: Mexican
- Born: 22 October 1996 (age 30) Nuevo León

Sport
- Country: Mexico
- Sport: Diving
- Events: 3m, 10 m, 10m synchro, 3 m synchro
- Club: Mexico State
Medal record
Men's diving
Representing Mexico
Summer Universiade
| Silver medal – second place | 2019 Naples | Team |
| Silver medal – second place | 2019 Naples | 10 m synchro |

Andrés Isaac Villarreal Tudón (born October 22, 1996) is a Mexican diver.
