= Liu Chengming (diver) =

Chinese diver (born 1998)

Personal information
- Born: 4 February 1998 (age 28)

Sport
- Country: China
- Sport: Diving
Medal record
Men's diving
Representing China
Asian Games
Silver medal – second place	2018 Jakarta	1 m springboard
Summer Universiade
Gold medal – first place	2019 Naples	1 m springboard
Gold medal – first place	2019 Naples	3 m springboard
Gold medal – first place	2019 Naples	Team

Liu Chengming (simplified Chinese: 刘成铭; traditional Chinese: 劉成銘; pinyin: Liú Chéngmíng; born 4 February 1998) is a Chinese diver. In 2018, he won the silver medal in the men's 1 metre springboard event at the 2018 Asian Games held in Jakarta, Indonesia. In 2019, he won the gold medal in both the men's 1 metre and 3 metre springboard events at the 2019 Summer Universiade held in Naples, Italy.
