= Valente Mendoza =

Mexican sprinter (born 1997)

Personal information
- Full name: Valente Mendoza Falcón
- Born: 17 January 1997 (age 29)

Sport
- Country: Mexico
- Sport: Athletics
- Event: 400 metres

Achievements and titles
- Personal best: 45.38 (Mexico Coty 2023)
Medal record
Men's athletics
Representing Mexico
NACAC Championships
Silver medal – second place	2025 Freeport	4 × 400 m relay
Summer Universiade
Gold medal – first place	2019 Naples	400 m
Gold medal – first place	2019 Naples	4×400 m relay
Pan American Games
Silver medal – second place	2023 Santiago	4×400 m relay

Valente Mendoza Falcón (Note: In this Spanish name, the first or paternal surname is Mendoza and the second or maternal family name is Falcón.) (born 17 January 1997) is a Mexican sprinter. In 2019, he won the gold medal in the men's 400 metres at the 2019 Summer Universiade held in Naples, Italy. He also won the gold medal in the men's 4 × 400 metres relay event.
