= Italy at the 2019 Summer Universiade =

- IOC code: ITA
- NOC: Italian National Olympic Committee
- Website: www.cusi.it(in Italian)

in Naples, Italy
- Competitors: 300 in 18 sports
- Flag bearer: Beatrice Vio
- Medals Ranked 6th: Gold 15 Silver 13 Bronze 16 Total 44

Summer Universiade appearances (overview)
- 1959; 1961; 1963; 1965; 1967; 1970; 1973; 1975; 1977; 1979; 1981; 1983; 1985; 1987; 1989; 1991; 1993; 1995; 1997; 1999; 2001; 2003; 2005; 2007; 2009; 2011; 2013; 2015; 2017; 2019; 2021; 2025; 2027

Italy participated at the 2019 Summer Universiade in Naples, Italy from 3 to 14 July 2019.

== Medal by sports ==
Medals by sport
Sport	1st place, gold medalist(s)	2nd place, silver medalist(s)	3rd place, bronze medalist(s)	Total
Fencing	5	3	5	13
Athletics	4	0	0	4
Shooting	2	1	1	4
Swimming	1	5	5	11
Gymnastics	1	2	1	4
Volleyball	1	1	0	2
Waterpolo	1	1	0	2
Diving	0	0	2	2
Taekwondo	0	0	1	1
Football	0	0	1	1
Total	15	13	16	44

== Medalists ==
Medal	Name	Sport	Event	Date
Gold	Jacopo Alesiani, Mario Guidi, Ettore Novara; Pierre Pellegrini, Francesco Massaro, Federico Panerai; Matteo Spione, Giacomo Cannella, Umberto Esposito; Eduardo Campopiano, Massimo Di Martire, Mario Del Basso; Lorenzo Bruni	Waterpolo	Men team	13 July
Gold	Fabio Ricci, Giulio Pinali, Sebastiano Milan; Giacomo Raffaelli, Alberto Polo, Yuri Romanò; Paolo Zonca, Marco Pierotti, Nicola Salsi; Alessandro Piccinelli, Gianluca Galassi, Francesco Zoppellari	Volleyball	Men team	13 July
Silver	Maddalena Fisco, Luna Di Claudio, Sara Centanni; Agnese Cocchiere, Giulia Cuzzupè, Martina Gottardo; Carolina Ioannoli, Serena Storai, Giulia Millo; Chiara Ranalli, Anna Repetto, Fabiana Sparano; Carlotta Malara	Waterpolo	Women team	13 July
Bronze	Gianluca Marcantognini, Tommaso Cucchietti, Filippo Florio; Davide Vitturini, Riccardo Gatti, Federico Giraudo; Alberto Tentardini, Cesare Pogliano, Giorgio Galli; Riccardo Serena, Riccardo Collodel, Loris Zonta; Roberto Grieco, Mario Mercadante, Giovanni Sbrissa; Giuseppe Ungaro, Alessandro Galeandro, Danilo Ruzzittu; Filippo Strada, Matteo Cericola	Football	Men team	13 July
Silver	Alessia Russo	Gymnastics	Women ribbon	13 July
Silver	Carlotta Cambi, Francesca Bosio, Beatrice Berti; Alexandra Botezat, Beatrice Molinaro, Elena Perinelli; Giulia Angelina, Francesca Villani, Sylvia Nwakalor; Anna Nicoletti, Chiara De Bortoli,Francesca Napodano	Volleyball	Women team	12 July
Gold	Luminosa Bogliolo	Athletics	Women 100 m hurdles	12 July
Gold	Roberta Bruni	Athletics	Women Pole Vault	11 July
Silver	Linda Caponi	Swimming	Women 200m Freestyle	10 July
Gold	Ayomide Folorunso	Athletics	Women 400 m hurdles	10 July
Bronze	Antonio Flecca	Taekwondo	Men 58kg	10 July
Gold	Daisy Osakue	Athletics	Women discus throw	9 July
Silver	Mattia Zuin; Matteo Ciampi; Alessio Proietti Colonna; Stefano Di Cola	Swimming	Men 4x200m freestyle	9 July
Gold	Silvia Scalia	Swimming	Women 50m Backstroke	9 July
Gold	Lucia Lucarini; Michela Battiston; Rebecca Gargano	Fencing	Women Sabre Team	9 July
Gold	Guillaume Bianchi; Francesco Ingargiola; Damiano Rosatelli	Fencing	Men Foil Team	9 July
Gold	Chiara Di Marziantonio	Shooting	Women Skeet	9 July
Bronze	Dario Di Martino; Maria Varricchio	Shooting	Mixed 10m air pistol	9 July
Bronze	Lorenzo Buzzi; Valerio Cuomo; Federico Vismara	Fencing	Men Épée Team	8 July
Gold	Erica Cipressa; Camilla Mancini; Martina Sinigalia	Fencing	Women Foil Team	8 July
Silver	Linda Caponi; Paola Biagioli; Alice Scarabelli; Sara Ongaro	Swimming	Women 4 x 200 m freestyle relay	7 July
Silver	Lara Mori	Gymnastics	Women balance beam	7 July
Bronze	Silvia Scalia	Swimming	Women 100m Backstroke	7 July
Gold	Carlotta Ferlito	Gymnastics	Women Floor	7 July
Silver	Roberta Marzani; Eleonora De Marchi; Nicol Foietta	Fencing	Women Épée Team	7 July
Silver	Lara Mori	Gymnastics	Women balance beam	7 July
Bronze	Stefano Di Cola	Swimming	Men 200m Freestyle	6 July
Bronze	Andrea Consoli; Francesco Porco	Diving	Men's synchronized 3 m springboard	6 July
Silver	Lucia Lucarini	Fencing	Women Sabre Individual	6 July
Bronze	Michela Battiston	Fencing	Women Sabre Individual	6 July
Gold	Damiano Rosatelli	Fencing	Men Foil Individual	6 July
Silver	Guillaume Bianchi	Fencing	Men Foil Individual	6 July
Gold	Simone D'Ambrosio; Fiammetta Rossi	Shooting	Mixed Trap	6 July
Gold	Erica Cipressa	Fencing	Women Foil Individual	5 July
Bronze	Camilla Mancini	Fencing	Women Foil Individual	5 July
Bronze	Carlotta Ferlito; Lara Mori; Martina Rizzelli	Gymnastics	Women Team all-around	5 July
Bronze	Roberta Marzani	Fencing	Women Épée Individual	5 July
Silver	Fiammetta Rossi	Shooting	Women Trap	5 July
Bronze	Ilaria Cusinato	Swimming	Women 400m Medley	4 July
Bronze	Paola Biagioli; Gioelemaria Origlia; Giulia Verona; Aglalia Pezzato	Swimming	Women 4x100m Freestyle	4 July
Silver	Matteo Ciampi	Swimming	Men 400m Freestyle	4 July
Bronze	Ivano Vendrame; Alessandro Bori; Davide Nardini; Giovanni Izzo	Swimming	Men 4x100m Freestyle	4 July
Bronze	Matteo Neri	Fencing	Men Sabre Individual	5 July
Bronze	Gabriele Auber	Diving	Men's 1 m springboard	4 July

Medals by date
Day	Date	1st place, gold medalist(s)	2nd place, silver medalist(s)	3rd place, bronze medalist(s)	Total
Day 1	4 July	0	1	3	4
Day 2	5 July	1	1	5	7
Day 3	6 July	2	3	3	8
Day 4	7 July	1	3	1	5
Day 5	8 July	1	0	1	2
Day 6	9 July	5	1	0	5
Day 7	10 July	1	1	1	3
Day 8	11 July	2	0	0	2
Day 9	12 July	0	1	0	1
Day 10	13 July	1	2	1	4
Day 11	14 July	1	0	0	1
Total		15	13	16	44

== See also ==
- Italy at the Universiade
