= Raimondo Ricci Bitti =

Italian tennis player

- Country (sports): Italy
- Born: 24 June 1956 (age 68)

Doubles
- Career record: 0–5
- Highest ranking: No. 791 (3 Jan 1983)
Medal record
Summer Universiade
Silver medal – second place	1981 Bucharest	Men's Doubles
Silver medal – second place	1983 Edmonton	Men's Doubles

Raimondo Ricci Bitti (born 24 June 1956) is a former professional tennis player.

Ricci Bitti, a Faenza native, won back to back Universiade silver medals for men's doubles in 1981 and 1983. During his professional career he made four doubles main draw appearances at the Bologna Indoor.

His elder brother is sports administrator Francesco Ricci Bitti.
