= Matej Medveď =

Slovak sport shooter (1996–2020)

Personal information
- Nationality: Slovak
- Born: 3 July 1996 Brezno, Slovakia
- Died: 25 July 2020 (aged 24) Košice, Slovakia
- Height: 63 kg
- Weight: 1.76 m

Sport
- Country: Slovakia
- Sport: Shooting
- Event(s): 10 m air rifle 50 m air rifle
- Club: Dukla Banská Bystrica
- Coached by: Zoltán Baláž
Medal record
Men's shooting
Representing Slovakia
Summer Universiade
Bronze medal – third place	2019 Naples	10 metre air rifle team

Matej Medveď (3 July 1996 – 25 July 2020) was a Slovak sport shooter who competed in the men's 10 metre air rifle. He competed for Slovakia at the 2019 Summer Universiade in Naples, Italy and 2019 European Games in Minsk, Belarus.

== Death ==
Medveď died unexpectedly after a shooting competition in Košice aged 24. He was buried on 30 July 2020, in his hometown Brezno.
