= Carolina Mendoza (diver) =

Mexican diver

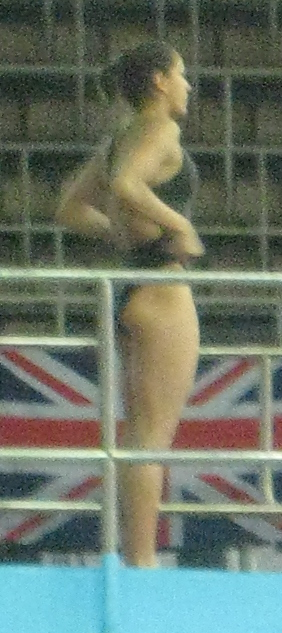

Personal information
- Born: 25 April 1997 (age 29) Naucalpan, Mexico
- Height: 1.61 m (5 ft 3 in)

Sport
- Country: Mexico
- Sport: Diving
- Event: 3 m synchro
Medal record
Women's diving
Representing Mexico
Central American and Caribbean Games
Silver medal – second place	2023 San Salvador	1 m springboard
Bronze medal – third place	2023 San Salvador	3 m synchro
Summer Universiade
Gold medal – first place	2019 Naples	3 m synchro
Silver medal – second place	2019 Naples	Team
Bronze medal – third place	2019 Naples	Mixed 3 m synchro

Carolina Mendoza Hernández (born 25 April 1997) is a Mexican diver from Naucalpan. At only 15 years of age, she achieved qualification to participate at the 2012 Summer Olympics in the individual 10 metre platform event.
