= Giordano Maioli =

Italian tennis player (born 1943)

- Country (sports): Italy
- Born: 27 September 1943 (age 82) Piacenza, Italy

Singles
- Career record: 20-20

Grand Slam singles results
- French Open: 2R (1966, 1967)
- Wimbledon: 3R (1967)

Doubles

Grand Slam doubles results
- Wimbledon: 1R (1966)

Grand Slam mixed doubles results
- Wimbledon: 1R (1966)
Medal record
Event	1st	2nd	3rd
Summer Universiade	1	2	3
Mediterranean Games	0	0	1

Giordano Maioli (born 27 September 1943), is an Italian former tennis player.

== Biography ==
He won six medals at the Summer Universiade from 1963 to 1967. In 1966 he won the Italian Tennis Championships and has played 19 times in Davis Cup. He reached the third round of the singles event at the 1967 Wimbledon Championships. He is currently General Manager of Alpina Maglierie Sportive S.p.A., a manufacturer of sportswear under the brand Australian.

== Achievements ==
Year	Competition	Venue	Event	Medal	Notes
1963	Summer Universiade	(Brazil) Porto Alegre	Mixed doubles	1st	
1963	Summer Universiade	(Brazil) Porto Alegre	Single	2nd	
1963	Summer Universiade	(Brazil) Porto Alegre	Men's doubles	3rd	
1965	Summer Universiade	(Hungary) Budapest	Mixed doubles	3rd	
1967	Summer Universiade	(Japan) Tokyo	Mixed doubles	2nd	
1967	Summer Universiade	(Japan) Tokyo	Men's doubles	3rd	
1967	Mediterranean Games	(Tunisia) Tunis	Men's doubles	3rd	
