= Stefano Gaudenzi =

Italian tennis player

- Full name: Stefano Leone Gaudenzi
- Country (sports): Italy
- Born: 27 September 1941 (age 83); Faenza, Italy

Singles
- Career record: 4–5
Medal record
Event	1st	2nd	3rd
Summer Universiade	0	0	3

Stefano Gaudenzi (born 27 September 1941) was a former tennis player, mainly specialized in doubles.

== Biography ==
He won three bronze medals in doubles at the Summer Universiade from 1961 to 1967. He is the uncle of tennis player Andrea Gaudenzi.

== Achievements ==
Year	Competition	Venue	Event	Medal	Notes
1961	Summer Universiade	(Bulgaria) Sofia	Men's doubles	3rd	
1963	Summer Universiade	(Brazil) Porto Alegre	Men's doubles	3rd	
1967	Summer Universiade	(Japan) Tokyo	Men's doubles	3rd	
