= Manuela Dalla Valle =

Italian swimmer (born 1963)

Personal information
- Full name: Manuela Dalla Valle
- Nationality: Italian
- Born: 20 January 1963 (age 63) Como
- Height: 1.61 m (5 ft 3 in)

Sport
- Sport: Swimming
- Strokes: Breaststroke and medley
- Club: DDS Milano
Medal record
European Championships
Silver medal – second place	1987 Strasbourg	100 m breaststroke
Silver medal – second place	1987 Strasbourg	4×100 m medley
Silver medal – second place	1989 Bonn	4×100 m medley
Bronze medal – third place	1989 Bonn	100 m breaststroke
Summer Universiade
Gold medal – first place	1987 Zagreb	100 m breaststroke
Silver medal – second place	1987 Zagreb	200 m breaststroke
Bronze medal – third place	1983 Edmonton	100 m breaststroke
Bronze medal – third place	1985 Kobe	100 m breaststroke
Mediterranean Games
Gold medal – first place	1979 Split	4×100 m freestyle
Gold medal – first place	1979 Split	4×100 m medley
Gold medal – first place	1987 Latakia	100 m breaststroke
Gold medal – first place	1987 Latakia	200 m breaststroke
Gold medal – first place	1987 Latakia	4×100 m freestyle
Gold medal – first place	1987 Latakia	4×100 m medley
Gold medal – first place	1991 Athens	100 m breaststroke
Gold medal – first place	1991 Athens	200 m breaststroke
Gold medal – first place	1997 Bari	100 m breaststroke
Gold medal – first place	1997 Bari	4×100 m medley
Silver medal – second place	1979 Split	100 m freestyle
Bronze medal – third place	1983 Casablanca	100 m breaststroke
Bronze medal – third place	1983 Casablanca	200 m medley
Bronze medal – third place	1991 Athens	4×100 m freestyle

Manuela Dalla Valle (born 20 January 1963 in Como) is a retired medley and breaststroke swimmer from Italy, who represented her native country in four consecutive Summer Olympics, starting in 1984. She won her first international senior medal, a silver in the women's 100 m breaststroke, at the 1987 European Championships (long course).

Awards
Preceded by Maria Canins	Italian Sportswoman of the Year; 1987	Succeeded by Laura Fogli
