= Maria Teresa Riedl =

Italian tennis player

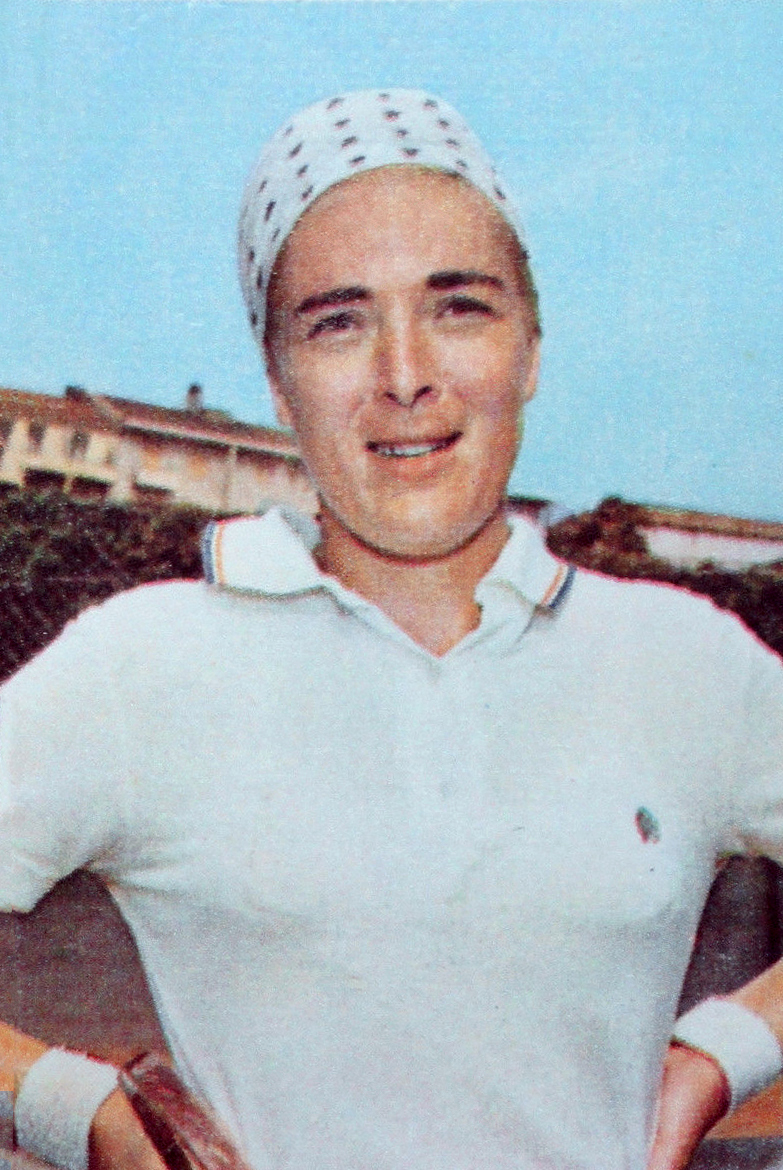
- Country (sports): Italy
- Born: 14 December 1937 Gorizia, Italy
- Died: 12 May 1995 (aged 57) Bruneck, Italy

Singles
- Career record: 5–12

Grand Slam singles results
- Wimbledon: 2R (1965, 1968)

Doubles
- Career record: 2–3
Medal record
Event	1st	2nd	3rd
Summer Universiade	5	0	3

Maria Teresa Riedl (14 December 1937 – 12 May 1995) was a tennis player from Italy.

== Biography ==
She won eight medals at the Summer Universiade from 1959 to 1965.

== Achievements ==
Year	Competition	Venue	Event	Medal	Notes
1959	Summer Universiade	(Italy) Turin	Singles	3rd	
1959	Summer Universiade	(Italy) Turin	Women's doubles	1st	
1961	Summer Universiade	(Bulgaria) Sofia	Mixed doubles	1st	
1963	Summer Universiade	(Brazil) Porto Alegre	Singles	3rd	
1963	Summer Universiade	(Brazil) Porto Alegre	Mixed doubles	1st	
1965	Summer Universiade	(Hungary) Bucharest	Singles	1st	
1965	Summer Universiade	(Hungary) Bucharest	Women's double	1st	
1965	Summer Universiade	(Hungary) Bucharest	Mixed doubles	3rd	
