= Athletics at the 2021 Summer World University Games – Women's long jump =

The women's long jump event at the 2021 Summer World University Games was held on 1 and 2 August 2023 at the Shuangliu Sports Centre Stadium in Chengdu, China.

== Medalists ==
Gold	Silver	Bronze
Nikola Horowska; Poland	Magdalena Bokun; Poland	Bhavan Bhagavathi; India

== Results ==
=== Qualification ===
Qualification: Qualifying performance 6.50 (Q) or at least 12 best performers (q) advance to the final.

Rank	Group	Name	Nationality	#1	#2	#3	Result	Notes
1	B	Merle Homeier	Germany	x	6.17	6.56	6.56	Q
2	A	Nikola Horowska	Poland	x	6.35	x	6.35	q
3	A	Guo Sijia	China	x	6.28	–	6.28	q, SB
4	B	Isabel Posch	Austria	6.23	6.07	x	6.23	q
5	A	Annie McGuire	Australia	x	6.20	5.95	6.20	q
6	B	Magdalena Bokun	Poland	6.18	6.08	x	6.18	q
7	B	Alyssa Lowe	Australia	5.93	6.15	x	6.15	q
8	B	Bhavani Bhagavathi	India	6.12	6.05	x	6.12	q
9	B	Hua Shihui	China	6.11	x	5.95	6.11	q
10	A	Lea-Jasmin Riecke	Germany	4.19	x	6.09	6.09	q
11	A	Thainá Guerino	Brazil	x	6.08	5.89	6.08	q
12	A	Karmen Fouche	South Africa	6.07	x	6.04	6.07	q
13	B	Monika Lehenová	Slovakia	x	5.99	x	5.99	
14	B	Yue Nga Yan	Hong Kong	x	x	5.98	5.98	
15	B	Nurul Ashikin	Malaysia	5.84	5.71	x	5.84	
16	A	Silvia Kaliašová	Slovakia	5.68	x	5.84	5.84	
17	B	Thea Bremset	Norway	x	x	5.82	5.82	
18	A	Manisha Merel	India	5.81	5.81	x	5.81	
19	A	Anastassiya Rypakova	Kazakhstan	x	5.77	5.79	5.79	
20	B	Fakhriyya Taghizade	Azerbaijan	5.70	x	5.78	5.78	
21	A	Ridma Nishadi Abeyrathna	Sri Lanka	x	5.56	5.77	5.77	
22	B	Annette Nielsen	Denmark	5.70	5.64	x	5.70	
23	A	Laura Tølløse	Denmark	x	x	5.70	5.70	
24	A	Khushnoza Shavkatova	Uzbekistan	x	5.66	5.46	5.66	
25	A	Barbara Štuhec	Slovenia	x	5.66	4.61	5.66	
26	A	Blessing Gideon	Nigeria	5.53	x	5.54	5.54	PB
27	A	Fanni Bacsa	Hungary	5.53	x	5.30	5.53	
28	A	Ivanesia Djedjo	Cape Verde	x	4.54	5.29	5.29	SB
29	B	Amtul Rehman	Pakistan	x	5.06	5.20	5.20	
30	B	Fatimata Zoungrana	Burkina Faso	5.03	x	5.20	5.20	
31	B	Sayina Khoshimova	Uzbekistan	x	x	5.15	5.15	
32	B	Raghad Habib Bu Arish	Saudi Arabia	4.58	x	4.03	4.58	
–	B	Maëlly Dalmat	France	x	x	x	NM	
–	A	Lee Huijin	South Korea	x	x	x	NM	
–	A	Chan Ka Sin	Hong Kong	x	x	x	NM	
–	B	Dorcas Opoku	Oman	x	x	x	NM	
–	A	Sou I Man	Macau	x	x	x	NM	
–	B	Leoni Adams	Guyana	–	–	–	DNS	
–	A	Aliya Al-Mughairi	Oman	–	–	–	DNS	

=== Final ===
Rank	Name	Nationality	#1	#2	#3	#4	#5	#6	Result	Notes
1st place, gold medalist(s)	Nikola Horowska	Poland	6.33	6.24	x	6.60	x	x	6.60	PB
2nd place, silver medalist(s)	Magdalena Bokun	Poland	6.15	x	5.89	6.25	6.41	6.25	6.41	
3rd place, bronze medalist(s)	Bhavan Bhagavathi	India	x	6.05	6.14	6.24	6.13	6.32	6.32	
4	Merle Homeier	Germany	5.88	6.19	6.19	6.29	x	x	6.29	
5	Guo Sijia	China	6.24	6.18	x	x	5.65	x	6.24	
6	Isabel Posch	Austria	6.01	6.24	5.96	6.09	x	5.90	6.24	
7	Lea-Jasmin Riecke	Germany	x	6.17	x	6.19	6.22	4.42	6.22	
8	Alyssa Lowe	Australia	5.77	6.15	x	5.89	5.98	6.05	6.15	
9	Karmen Fouche	South Africa	6.07	5.94	x				6.07	
10	Annie McGuire	Australia	x	5.74	6.05				6.05	
11	Thainá Guerino	Brazil	x	x	6.02				6.02	
12	Hua Shihui	China	5.95	x	5.84				5.95	
