= Athletics at the 2021 Summer World University Games – Women's 200 metres =

The women's 200 metres event at the 2021 Summer World University Games was held on 3 and 4 August 2023 at the Shuangliu Sports Centre Stadium in Chengdu, China.

== Medalists ==
| Gold | Silver | Bronze |
|---|---|---|
| Nikola Horowska; Poland | Marlena Granaszewska; Poland | Banele Shabangu; South Africa |

== Results ==
=== Round 1 ===
Qualification: First 3 in each heat (Q) and the next 3 fastest (q) advance to semifinal.

| Rank | Heat | Name | Nationality | Time | Notes |
|---|---|---|---|---|---|
| 1 | 5 | Marlena Granaszewska | Poland | 23.36 | Q |
| 2 | 5 | Talea Prepens | Germany | 23.46 | Q |
| 3 | 1 | Banele Shabangu | South Africa | 23.48 | Q |
| 4 | 4 | Kristie Edwards | Australia | 23.60 | Q |
| 5 | 1 | Carla Bull | Australia | 23.64 | Q |
| 6 | 7 | Louise Wieland | Germany | 23.64 | Q |
| 7 | 2 | Nikola Horowska | Poland | 23.71 | Q |
| 8 | 6 | Gabriela Mourão | Brazil | 23.89 | Q |
| 9 | 2 | Simay Özçiftçi | Turkey | 23.90 | Q |
| 10 | 7 | Magdalena Lindner | Austria | 23.91 | Q |
| 11 | 1 | Marte Pettersen | Norway | 23.92 | Q |
| 12 | 3 | Letícia Lima | Brazil | 23.93 | Q |
| 13 | 7 | Cai Yanting | China | 24.03 | Q |
| 14 | 1 | Zhang Bo-ya | Chinese Taipei | 24.03 | q, PB |
| 15 | 4 | Corrssia Perry | United States | 24.06 | Q |
| 16 | 6 | Céline Bürgi | Switzerland | 24.07 | Q |
| 17 | 7 | Mary Boakye | Ghana | 24.07 | q |
| 18 | 5 | Abigeirufuka Ido | Japan | 24.16 | Q |
| 19 | 4 | Joviale Mbisha | South Africa | 24.21 | Q |
| 20 | 6 | Elif Polat | Turkey | 24.38 | Q |
| 21 | 3 | Lovina Ewusi | Ghana | 24.42 | Q |
| 22 | 3 | Li Yuting | China | 24.43 | Q |
| 23 | 4 | Chaima Ouanis | Algeria | 24.49 | q |
| 24 | 2 | Jacent Nyamahunge | Uganda | 24.51 | Q |
| 25 | 6 | Manaka Miura | Japan | 24.54 | |
| 26 | 5 | Chang Li-ling | Chinese Taipei | 24.59 | |
| 27 | 2 | Gayane Chiloyan | Armenia | 24.61 | |
| 28 | 6 | Elizabeth-Ann Tan | Singapore | 24.66 | |
| 29 | 4 | Golekanye Chikani | Botswana | 24.73 | |
| 30 | 1 | Laura van der Veen | Norway | 24.76 | SB |
| 31 | 1 | Pratyusha Chelimi | India | 24.83 | |
| 32 | 5 | Toni Canfall | United States | 24.84 | |
| 33 | 5 | Kristina Kondrashova | Kazakhstan | 24.90 | |
| 34 | 3 | Melani Bosić | Croatia | 24.93 | |
| 35 | 2 | Victoria Aransiola | Nigeria | 24.98 | |
| 36 | 6 | Tang Pui Kwan | Hong Kong | 25.00 | |
| 37 | 3 | Alexandra Zalyubovskaya | Kazakhstan | 25.27 | |
| 38 | 4 | Simran Deep Kaur | India | 25.37 | |
| 39 | 7 | Boitshepo Moloi | Botswana | 25.47 | |
| 40 | 3 | Sonita Kamara | Sierra Leone | 25.70 | |
| 41 | 7 | Djamila Zine | Algeria | 25.72 | |
| 42 | 7 | Kim Ju-ha | South Korea | 25.78 | |
| 43 | 3 | Chao Sin Ian | Macau | 26.63 | |
| 44 | 4 | Ivanesia Djedjo | Cape Verde | 26.92 | |
| 45 | 5 | Alsu Habibulina | Turkmenistan | 26.93 | |
| 46 | 2 | Hajer Al-Habsi | Oman | 26.95 | |
| 47 | 6 | Rose Draru | Uganda | 27.33 | |
| – | 2 | Lushomo Mukakanga | Zambia | DQ | TR16.8 |
| – | 1 | Amasha De Silva | Sri Lanka | DNS | |
| –– | 3 | Blessing Akintoye | Nigeria | DNS | |
| – | 5 | Lyka Janer | Philippines | DNS | |
| – | 6 | Aisha Farage | The Gambia | DNS | |
| – | 7 | Jane Ndihuri | Kenya | DNS | |

=== Semifinal ===
Qualification: First 2 in each heat (Q) and the next 2 fastest (q) advance to final.

| Rank | Heat | Name | Nationality | Time | Notes |
|---|---|---|---|---|---|
| 1 | 2 | Banele Shabangu | South Africa | 23.09 | Q, PB |
| 2 | 3 | Nikola Horowska | Poland | 23.19 | Q, SB |
| 3 | 1 | Marlena Granaszewska | Poland | 23.30 | Q |
| 4 | 2 | Louise Wieland | Germany | 23.36 | Q |
| 5 | 3 | Magdalena Lindner | Austria | 23.45 | Q, PB |
| 6 | 1 | Talea Prepens | Germany | 23.46 | Q |
| 7 | 3 | Kristie Edwards | Australia | 23.48 | q |
| 8 | 3 | Li Yuting | China | 23.51 | q |
| 9 | 2 | Carla Bull | Australia | 23.73 | |
| 9 | 2 | Simay Özçiftçi | Turkey | 23.73 | PB |
| 11 | 2 | Zhang Bo-ya | Chinese Taipei | 23.77 | PB |
| 12 | 3 | Marte Pettersen | Norway | 23.87 | |
| 13 | 1 | Gabriela Mourão | Brazil | 23.95 | |
| 14 | 1 | Céline Bürgi | Switzerland | 24.01 | |
| 15 | 1 | Joviale Mbisha | South Africa | 24.17 | |
| 16 | 3 | Abigeirufuka Ido | Japan | 24.17 | |
| 17 | 2 | Jacent Nyamahunge | Uganda | 24.26 | |
| 18 | 1 | Corrssia Perry | United States | 24.28 | |
| 19 | 2 | Lovina Ewusi | Ghana | 24.46 | |
| 20 | 1 | Elif Polat | Turkey | 24.50 | |
| 21 | 1 | Chaima Ouanis | Algeria | 24.62 | |
| 22 | 3 | Letícia Lima | Brazil | 24.68 | |
| 23 | 2 | Cai Yanting | China | 26.13 | |
| – | 3 | Mary Boakye | Ghana | DNS | |

=== Final ===
| Rank | Name | Nationality | Time | Notes |
|---|---|---|---|---|
| 1st place, gold medalist(s) | Nikola Horowska | Poland | 23.00 | SB |
| 2nd place, silver medalist(s) | Marlena Granaszewska | Poland | 23.20 | PB |
| 3rd place, bronze medalist(s) | Banele Shabangu | South Africa | 23.29 | |
| 4 | Talea Prepens | Germany | 23.46 | |
| 5 | Kristie Edwards | Australia | 23.54 | |
| 6 | Magdalena Lindner | Austria | 23.54 | |
| 7 | Louise Wieland | Germany | 23.60 | |
| 8 | Li Yuting | China | 27.63 | |
