= Athletics at the 2021 Summer World University Games – Women's shot put =

The women's shot put event at the 2021 Summer World University Games was held on 1 August 2023 at the Shuangliu Sports Centre Stadium in Chengdu, China.

== Medalists ==
Gold	Silver	Bronze
Song Jiayuan; China	Eliana Bandeira; Portugal	Lea Riedel; Germany

== Results ==
=== Qualification ===
Qualification: Qualifying performance 18.00 (Q) or at least 12 best performers (q) advance to the final.

Rank	Group	Name	Nationality	#1	#2	#3	Result	Notes
1	A	Song Jiayuan	China	18.19			18.19	Q
2	B	Eliana Bandeira	Portugal	x	17.42	x	17.42	q
3	B	Emel Dereli	Turkey	15.79	16.62	–	16.62	q
4	A	Lea Riedel	Germany	14.91	15.83	16.32	16.32	q
5	A	Malika Nasreddinova	Uzbekistan	15.22	16.29	x	16.29	q
6	B	Ye Wenqi	China	15.88	16.00	16.00	16.00	q
7	B	Miryam Mazenauer	Switzerland	15.79	15.69	x	15.79	q
8	B	Milena Sens	Brazil	15.29	15.51	15.45	15.51	q
9	A	Violetta Veiland	Hungary	14.56	14.67	15.19	15.19	q
10	A	Rafaela Maciel de Sousa	Brazil	13.54	15.18	14.89	15.18	q
11	B	Shiksha Shiksha	India	14.44	x	x	14.44	q
12	B	Shiloh Nelson	Philippines	x	13.61	12.58	13.61	q
13	A	Nidhi Pawaiya	India	x	13.40	13.21	13.40	
14	A	Wayne Nkomo	Zimbabwe	12.03	11.77	10.85	12.03	
15	A	Monika Neang	Cambodia	10.74	9.81	9.61	10.74	
16	B	Claudia Talledo	Peru	9.84	x	10.44	10.44	
–	A	Malinda Williams	Guyana				DNS	

=== Final ===
Rank	Name	Nationality	#1	#2	#3	#4	#5	#6	Result	Notes
1st place, gold medalist(s)	Song Jiayuan	China	18.24	x	17.33	17.87	18.56	–	18.56	
2nd place, silver medalist(s)	Eliana Bandeira	Portugal	x	16.73	x	17.10	17.30	17.47	17.47	
3rd place, bronze medalist(s)	Lea Riedel	Germany	16.29	x	16.53	16.78	17.32	16.92	17.32	
4	Emel Dereli	Turkey	16.65	16.21	16.23	x	16.81	16.85	16.85	SB
5	Miryam Mazenauer	Switzerland	16.78	x	16.02	16.05	16.63	16.25	16.78	PB
6	Malika Nasreddinova	Uzbekistan	16.37	15.99	16.37	16.78	x	x	16.78	
7	Ye Wenqi	China	16.18	16.70	x	16.45	x	x	16.70	
8	Rafaela Maciel de Sousa	Brazil	15.24	x	15.53	16.33	15.02	x	16.33	PB
9	Milena Sens	Brazil	15.17	x	x				15.17	
10	Violetta Veiland	Hungary	14.20	14.54	14.89				14.89	
11	Shiksha Shiksha	India	x	14.48	x				14.48	
12	Shiloh Nelson	Philippines	13.77	13.48	14.42				14.42	
