= Slovenia at the 2021 Summer World University Games =

- Flag of Slovenia
- IOC code: SLO

in Chengdu, China 28 July 2023 – 8 August 2023
- Competitors: 25 (12 men and 13 women)
- Medals: Gold 0 Silver 0 Bronze 0 Total 0

Summer World University Games appearances
- 1959; 1961; 1963; 1965; 1967; 1970; 1973; 1975; 1977; 1979; 1981; 1983; 1985; 1987; 1989; 1991; 1993; 1995; 1997; 1999; 2001; 2003; 2005; 2007; 2009; 2011; 2013; 2015; 2017; 2019; 2021; 2025; 2027

Slovenia competed at the 2021 Summer World University Games in Chengdu, China held from 28 July to 8 August 2023.

== Competitors ==
Sport	Men	Women	Total
Archery	1	0	1
Artistic gymnastics	0	3	3
Athletics	4	7	11
Badminton	1	0	1
Fencing	5	0	5
Rhythmic gymnastics	0	2	2
Shooting	1	1	2
Total	12	13	25

== Archery ==
Player	Event	Ranking round		First round	Second round	Third round	Quarter-finals	Semi-finals	Final / BM	
Player	Event	Score	Rank	Opponent score	Opponent score	Opponent score	Opponent score	Opponent score	Opponent score	Rank
Sergej Podkrajšek	Men's individual recurve	637	31	Vetter (GER); W 6–0	Kim (KOR); L 2–6	Did not advance				

== Artistic gymnastics ==
Women

Athlete	Event	Qualification						Final					
Athlete	Event	Apparatus				Total	Rank	Apparatus				Total	Rank
Athlete	Event	V	UB	F	BB	Total	Rank	V	UB	F	BB	Total	Rank
Lara Crnjac	All-around	—	11.833	—				Did not advance					
Sara King	All-around	12.033	10.333	11.633	11.766	45.765	23	Did not advance					
Meta Kunaver	All-around	12.000	9.800	10.000	10.933	42.733	33	Did not advance					

== Athletics ==
Men
Track

Athlete	Event	Heat		Semi-finals		Final	
Athlete	Event	Result	Rank	Result	Rank	Result	Rank
Filip Jakob Demšar	110 metres hurdles	13.60 PB	6 q	—		13.63	5
Tilen Šimenko Lalič	800 metres	1:54.91 PB	32	Did not advance			
Klemen Vilhar	3000 metres steeplechase	9:40.98	15 q	—		9:27.84	13

Field

Athlete	Event	Qualification		Final	
Athlete	Event	Result	Rank	Result	Rank
Nino Celec	Long jump	NM		Did not advance	

Women
Track

Athlete	Event	Heat		Semi-finals		Final	
Athlete	Event	Result	Rank	Result	Rank	Result	Rank
Izabela Eržen	400 metres hurdle	1:02.74	20	Did not advance			
Anja Fink	Half marathon	—				1:16:34	13
Ajda Kaučič	400 metres	55.15	9 q	54.45	11	Did not advance	
Eva Murn	100 metres hurdles	Did not finish		Did not advan			

Field

Athlete	Event	Qualification		Final	
Athlete	Event	Result	Rank	Result	Rank
Monika Podlogar	High jump	1.80	12 q	1.80	8
Barbara Štuhec	Long jump	5.66	25	Did not advance	

Combined events

Athlete	Event		100H	HJ	SP	200 m	LJ	JT	800 m	Final	Rank
Tara Keber	Heptathlon	Result	14.06 SB	1.53 PB	10.93 SB	25.80	5.54	32.72 PB	2:44.34	4798 SB	20
Tara Keber	Heptathlon	Points	970	655	591	815	715	528	524	4798 SB	20

== Badminton ==
Athlete	Event	Round of 64	Round of 32	Round of 16	Quarterfinal	Semifinal	Final / BM	
Athlete	Event	Opposition Score	Opposition Score	Opposition Score	Opposition Score	Opposition Score	Opposition Score	Rank
Gregor Alič	Men's singles	Lohani (NEP); W 2–0	Lin (TPE); L 0–2	Did not advance				

== Fencing ==
Athlete	Event	Group stage							Round of 128	Round of 64	Round of 32	Round of 16	Quarter-finals	Semi-finals	Final / BM	
Athlete	Event	Opponent score	Opponent score	Opponent score	Opponent score	Opponent score	Opponent score	Rank	Opponent score	Opponent score	Opponent score	Opponent score	Opponent score	Opponent score	Opponent score	Rank
Bernard Baler	Men's individual épée	Paolini (ITA); L 1–5	Kovács (HUN); L 1–5	Tinnikov (KAZ); L 3–5	Straumøy (NOR); W 5–4	An (KOR); W 5–4	Chong (SGP); W 5–2	65 Q	Veenenbos (NED); L 3–15	Did not advance						
Lan Golob	Men's individual épée	Bányai (HUN); L 3–5	Erdenebat (MGL); W 5–2	Kolańczyk (POL); L 2–5	Berktold (AUT); L 1–5	Sidikov (UZB); W 5–2	Gally (FRA); L 2–5	79 Q	Bányai (HUN); L 4–15	Did not advance						
Timon Grubar	Men's individual épée	Alhussain (KSA); L 4–5	Bonferroni (SUI); L 3–4	Ra (CAM); W 5–3	Si To (SGP); L 0–5	Midelton (FRA); L 4–5	Muminov (UZB); W 5–2	76 Q	Schuhmann (AUT); L 6–15	Did not advance						
Jakob Pogačnik Souvent	Men's individual épée	Jin (USA); L 2–5	Keszthelyi (HUN); L 4–5	Kim (KOR); L 3–5	Sertay (KAZ); L 2–5	Balcar (CZE); L 2–5	Wong (HKG); L 0–5	97	Did not advance							
Tei Zaviršek Žorž	Men's individual sabre	Dreossi (ITA); L 0–5	Sung (KOR); L 0–5	Prosse (BEL); L 2–5	Wei (CHN); L 0–5	Seefeld (GER); L 3–5	—	64	Did not advance							
Timon Grubar; Bernard Baler; Jakob Pogačnik Souvent	Men's tean épée	—									United States (USA); L 19–45	Did not advance				

== Rhythmic gymnastics ==
Athlete	Event	Apparatus				Total	Rank
Athlete	Event	Hoop (rhythmic gymnastics)	Ball (rhythmic gymnastics)	Clubs (rhythmic gymnastics)	Ribbon (rhythmic gymnastics)	Total	Rank
Brigita Krašovec	Individual All-around	28.750	28.600	26.850	24.150	108.350	13
Nastja Podvratnik	Individual All-around	19.300	23.450	21.150	18.100	82.000	29

== Shooting ==
Men

Athlete	Event	Qualification		Final	
Athlete	Event	Points	Rank	Points	Rank
Jože Čeper	10 metre air pistol	565	28	Did not advance	
Jože Čeper	25 metre rapid fire pistol	568	17	Did not advance	

Women

Athlete	Event	Qualification		Final	
Athlete	Event	Points	Rank	Points	Rank
Jagoda Tkalec	10 metre air pistol	560	29	Did not advance	
Jagoda Tkalec	25 metre pistol	565	20	Did not advance	

Mixed

Athlete	Event	Qualification		Qualification Stage2		Final	
Athlete	Event	Points	Rank	Points	Rank	Points	Rank
Jože Čeper; Jagoda Tkalec	10 metre air pistol	563	17	Did not advance			
