= Athletics at the 2021 Summer World University Games – Men's 800 metres =

The men's 800 metres event at the 2021 Summer World University Games was held on 4, 5 and 6 August 2023 at the Shuangliu Sports Centre Stadium in Chengdu, China.

== Medalists ==
Gold	Silver	Bronze
Maciej Wyderka; Poland	Corentin le Clezio; France	Oussama Cherrad; Algeria Zine Laggoune; Algeria

== Results ==
=== Round 1 ===
Qualification: First 3 in each heat (Q) and the next 6 fastest (q) advance to semifinal.

==== Heat 1 ====
Rank	Athlete	Nation	Time	Notes
1	Oussama Cherrad	Algeria	1:50.26	Q
2	Maciej Wyderka	Poland	1:50.29	Q
3	Santtu Heikkinen	Finland	1:50.36	Q
4	Deniss Salmijanov	Estonia	1:50.61	q
5	Stavros Spyrou	Cyprus	1:51.80	q
6	Wan Muhammad Fazri	Malaysia	1:51.88	

==== Heat 2 ====
Rank	Athlete	Nation	Time	Notes
1	Corentin le Clezio	France	1:52.14	Q
2	Peter Akemkwene	Uganda	1:52.21	Q
3	Jakub Augustyniak	Poland	1:52.29	Q
4	Mohammed Al-Suleimani	Oman	1:52.86	
5	Tilen Šimenko Lalič	Slovenia	1:54.91	SB
6	Mohammed Dwedar	Palestine	1:56.91	
—	Kwazi Nogcantsi	South Africa	DQ	TR17.4.4

==== Heat 3 ====
Rank	Athlete	Nation	Time	Notes
1	Luis Oberbeck	Germany	1:51.67	Q
2	Luke Boyes	Australia	1:51.73	Q
3	Ma Zhongqiang	China	1:51.80	Q
4	Matheus Aguiar	Brazil	1:51.97	
5	El-Hafez Mahadi	Qatar	1:52.73	
6	Hamad Al-Yahyaee	United Arab Emirates	1:58.04	
—	Yervand Mkrtchyan	Armenia	DQ	TR17.4.4

==== Heat 4 ====
Rank	Athlete	Nation	Time	Notes
1	Zine Laggoune	Algeria	1:49.56	Q
2	Jack Lunn	Australia	1:49.78	Q
3	José Elizondo	Costa Rica	1:49.85	Q, PB
4	Sigurd Tveit	Norway	1:49.94	q
5	Cristian Voicu	Romania	1:50.18	q
6	Li Junlin	China	1:50.31	q
—	Omid Amirian	Iran	DQ	TR17.4.4

==== Heat 5 ====
Rank	Athlete	Nation	Time	Notes
1	Robin Oester	Switzerland	1:51.84	Q
2	Guilherme Rodrigues	Brazil	1:52.01	Q
3	Mehmet Çelik	Turkey	1:52.58	Q
4	Léandre Hamenyimana	Burundi	1:54.16	
5	Omkar Kumbhar	India	1:59.12	
6	Daniel Lara	Colombia	2:03.10	
—	Ali Idow Hassan	Somalia	DQ	TR17.4.3

==== Heat 6 ====
Rank	Athlete	Nation	Time	Notes
1	Alexandre Selles	France	1:49.95	Q
2	Edmund du Plessis	South Africa	1:50.24	Q
3	Ole Solbu	Norway	1:50.81	Q
4	Itumeleng James	Botswana	1:51.68	q, SB
5	Billy Ingabire	Burundi	1:54.42	PB
6	Innocent Kanyala	Zambia	1:54.54	
—	Khalid Al-Siyabi	Oman	DQ	TR17.4.3

=== Semifinal ===
Qualification: First 2 in each heat (Q) and the next 2 fastest (q) advance to final.

==== Heat 1 ====
Rank	Athlete	Nation	Time	Notes
1	Corentin le Clezio	France	1:47.19	Q
2	Luis Oberbeck	Germany	1:47.35	Q
3	Zine Laggoune	Algeria	1:47.39	q
4	Robin Oester	Switzerland	1:47.40	q, PB
5	Ma Zhongqiang	China	1:48.03	PB
6	Edmund du Plessis	South Africa	1:48.78	
—	Sigurd Tveit	Norway	DNF	
—	Peter Akemkwene	Uganda	DQ	TR17.4.3

==== Heat 2 ====
Rank	Athlete	Nation	Time	Notes
1	Alexandre Selles	France	1:48.08	Q
2	Oussama Cherrad	Algeria	1:48.38	Q
3	Ole Solbu	Norway	1:48.41	
4	Luke Boyes	Australia	1:48.79	
5	Jakub Augustyniak	Poland	1:50.47	
6	José Elizondo	Costa Rica	1:50.74	
7	Stavros Spyrou	Cyprus	1:54.36	
—	Itumeleng James	Botswana	DNS	

==== Heat 3 ====
Rank	Athlete	Nation	Time	Notes
1	Maciej Wyderka	Poland	1:47.00	Q
2	Jack Lunn	Australia	1:47.93	Q
3	Santtu Heikkinen	Finland	1:47.97	PB
4	Deniss Salmijanov	Estonia	1:48.40	
5	Cristian Voicu	Romania	1:48.71	
6	Li Junlin	China	1:49.80	SB
—	Guilherme Rodrigues	Brazil	DNF	
—	Mehmet Çelik	Turkey	DNF	

=== Final ===
Rank	Athlete	Nation	Time	Notes
1st place, gold medalist(s)	Maciej Wyderka	Poland	1:49.09	
2nd place, silver medalist(s)	Corentin le Clezio	France	1:49.17	
3rd place, bronze medalist(s)	Oussama Cherrad	Algeria	1:49.23 (.226)	
3rd place, bronze medalist(s)	Zine Laggoune	Algeria	1:49.23 (.226)	
5	Robin Oester	Switzerland	1:49.51	
6	Alexandre Selles	France	1:49.65	
7	Luis Oberbeck	Germany	1:49.80	
8	Jack Lunn	Australia	1:49.92	
