= Athletics at the 2021 Summer World University Games – Women's heptathlon =

The women's heptathlon event at the 2021 Summer World University Games was held on 4 and 5 August 2023 at the Shuangliu Sports Centre Stadium in Chengdu, China.

== Medalists ==
Gold	Silver	Bronze
Isabel Posch; Austria	Yuliya Loban; Ukraine	Lydia Boll; Switzerland

== Results ==
=== 100 metres hurdles ===
Rank	Heat	Name	Nationality	Time	Points	Notes
1	2	Marta Giovannini	Italy	13.66	1027	PB
2	3	Isabel Posch	Austria	13.67	1026	
3	2	Mariel Brokke	Costa Rica	13.69	1023	PB
4	2	Chiara-Belinda Schuler	Austria	13.84	1001	
5	3	Tainara Mees	Brazil	13.89	994	PB
6	3	Yuliya Loban	Ukraine	13.92	990	
7	3	Célia Perron	France	14.03	974	
8	3	Ida Eikeng	Norway	14.05	971	
9	3	Camryn Newton-Smith	Australia	14.05	971	
10	2	Tara Keber	Slovenia	14.06	970	SB
11	2	Lydia Boll	Switzerland	14.06	970	
12	4	Julia Słocka	Poland	14.09	966	SB
13	2	Edyta Bielska	Poland	14.10	964	
14	4	Chen Cai-juan	Chinese Taipei	14.19	952	SB
15	3	Szabina Szűcs	Hungary	14.24	945	
16	1	Jenifer Norberto	Brazil	14.26	942	SB
17	1	Kaitlyn McColly	United States	14.36	928	PB
18	4	Nikoline Lybæk Petersen	Denmark	14.38	925	PB
19	4	Afaf Benhadja	Algeria	14.46	914	
20	4	Yuri Tanaka	Japan	14.50	909	
21	1	Yin Xinyi	China	14.55	902	SB
22	1	Mia Scerri	Australia	14.75	875	
23	4	Pooja	India	15.42	787	PB
24	1	Tanu	India	15.46	782	PB
25	1	Diana Geints	Kazakhstan	16.30	678	SB

=== High jump ===
Rank	Group	Name	Nationality	1.35	1.38	1.41	1.44	1.47	1.50	1.53	1.56	Result	Points	Notes
Rank	Group	Name	Nationality	1.59	1.62	1.65	1.68	1.71	1.74	1.77	1.80	Result	Points	Notes
1	A	Yuliya Loban	Ukraine	–	–	–	–	–	–	–	–	1.77	941	PB
1	A	Yuliya Loban	Ukraine	–	o	o	o	xo	xo	xo	xxx	1.77	941	PB
2	A	Afaf Benhadja	Algeria	–	–	–	–	–	–	–	–	1.77	941	PB
2	A	Afaf Benhadja	Algeria	–	xo	o	o	xxo	o	xxo	xxx	1.77	941	PB
3	A	Célia Perron	France	–	–	–	–	–	–	–	–	1.74	903	
3	A	Célia Perron	France	–	–	o	o	xo	o	xxx		1.74	903	
4	A	Edyta Bielska	Poland	–	–	–	–	–	–	–	–	1.74	903	
4	A	Edyta Bielska	Poland	o	o	o	xo	xo	xo	xxx		1.74	903	
5	A	Mia Scerri	Australia	–	–	–	–	–	–	–	o	1.74	903	PB
5	A	Mia Scerri	Australia	–	o	o	xo	o	xxo	xxx		1.74	903	PB
6	B	Yin Xinyi	China	–	–	–	–	–	–	–	o	1.71	867	SB
6	B	Yin Xinyi	China	o	o	o	o	xo	xxx			1.71	867	SB
7	A	Chen Cai-juan	Chinese Taipei	–	–	–	–	–	–	–	–	1.71	867	
7	A	Chen Cai-juan	Chinese Taipei	–	xo	o	xxo	xo	xxx			1.71	867	
8	A	Camryn Newton-Smith	Australia	–	–	–	–	–	–	–	–	1.68	830	
8	A	Camryn Newton-Smith	Australia	–	–	o	o	xxx				1.68	830	
9	A	Marta Giovannini	Italy	–	–	–	–	–	–	–	o	1.68	830	
9	A	Marta Giovannini	Italy	xxo	o	xxo	xo	xxx				1.68	830	
10	B	Tainara Mees	Brazil	–	–	–	o	–	o	–	o	1.68	830	PB
10	B	Tainara Mees	Brazil	o	o	xxo	xxo	xxx				1.68	830	PB
10	B	Isabel Posch	Austria	–	–	–	–	–	o	o	o	1.68	830	PB
10	B	Isabel Posch	Austria	o	xo	xo	xxo	xxx				1.68	830	PB
12	A	Julia Słocka	Poland	–	–	–	–	–	–	–	o	1.65	795	
12	A	Julia Słocka	Poland	o	o	o	xxx					1.65	795	
13	B	Lydia Boll	Switzerland	–	–	–	–	–	o	o	o	1.65	795	
13	B	Lydia Boll	Switzerland	o	xo	o	xxx					1.65	795	
13	B	Chiara-Belinda Schuler	Austria	–	–	–	–	–	–	o	xo	1.65	795	PB
13	B	Chiara-Belinda Schuler	Austria	o	o	o	xxx					1.65	795	PB
15	A	Diana Geints	Kazakhstan	–	–	–	–	–	–	–	–	1.65	795	
15	A	Diana Geints	Kazakhstan	o	o	xo	xxx					1.65	795	
15	B	Tanu	India	–	–	–	–	–	o	o	o	1.65	795	
15	B	Tanu	India	o	o	xo	xxx					1.65	795	
17	A	Szabina Szűcs	Hungary	–	–	–	–	–	–	–	–	1.65	795	
17	A	Szabina Szűcs	Hungary	o	xo	xo	xxx					1.65	795	
18	A	Ida Eikeng	Norway	–	–	–	–	–	–	o	xo	1.62	759	
18	A	Ida Eikeng	Norway	o	o	xxx						1.62	759	
19	B	Nikoline Lybæk Petersen	Denmark	–	–	–	–	–	–	xo	o	1.62	759	
19	B	Nikoline Lybæk Petersen	Denmark	–	xxo	xxx						1.62	759	
20	A	Pooja	India	–	–	–	–	–	o	–	o	1.59	724	
20	A	Pooja	India	o	xxx							1.59	724	
21	B	Kaitlyn McColly	United States	–	–	–	–	o	o	xxo	xxo	1.59	724	
21	B	Kaitlyn McColly	United States	o	xxx							1.59	724	
22	B	Yuri Tanaka	Japan	–	–	–	o	–	o	xo	xo	1.56	689	
22	B	Yuri Tanaka	Japan	xxx								1.56	689	
23	B	Tara Keber	Slovenia	o	–	o	o	xo	xo	o	xxx	1.53	655	PB
24	B	Mariel Brokke	Costa Rica	–	–	–	–	o	xo	xxo	xxx	1.53	655	
25	B	Jenifer Norberto	Brazil	–	–	–	–	o	o	xxx		1.50	621	

=== Shot put ===
Rank	Group	Name	Nationality	#1	#2	#3	Result	Points	Notes
1	B	Yuliya Loban	Ukraine	12.98	14.27	x	14.27	812	
2	B	Lydia Boll	Switzerland	13.25	13.76	12.73	13.76	778	PB
3	B	Mia Scerri	Australia	13.27	13.13	13.48	13.48	759	PB
4	B	Chiara-Belinda Schuler	Austria	12.79	13.33	13.30	13.33	749	
5	B	Chen Cai-juan	Chinese Taipei	13.05	12.27	12.83	13.05	731	
6	B	Ida Eikeng	Norway	12.63	13.05	x	13.05	731	
7	B	Julia Słocka	Poland	12.48	12.92	12.68	12.92	722	
8	B	Isabel Posch	Austria	12.87	x	11.64	12.87	719	PB
9	B	Yin Xinyi	China	12.57	12.21	11.99	12.57	699	
10	B	Camryn Newton-Smith	Australia	12.50	12.04	x	12.50	694	
11	A	Tainara Mees	Brazil	11.05	x	12.17	12.17	672	
12	A	Yuri Tanaka	Japan	11.07	x	12.05	12.05	664	
13	B	Jenifer Norberto	Brazil	11.66	11.45	11.97	11.97	659	
14	B	Célia Perron	France	11.28	11.91	11.67	11.91	655	
15	B	Marta Giovannini	Italy	9.89	11.54	x	11.54	631	
16	A	Edyta Bielska	Poland	11.30	x	11.45	11.45	625	
17	A	Szabina Szűcs	Hungary	11.25	10.76	11.43	11.43	623	
18	A	Tanu	India	10.71	11.36	11.18	11.36	619	
19	A	Pooja	India	11.23	10.78	x	11.23	610	
20	A	Nikoline Lybæk Petersen	Denmark	11.02	10.92	x	11.02	596	
21	A	Tara Keber	Slovenia	10.23	10.67	10.93	10.93	591	SB
22	A	Diana Geints	Kazakhstan	10.72	10.79	x	10.79	581	
23	A	Kaitlyn McColly	United States	9.67	10.47	9.77	10.47	560	
24	A	Afaf Benhadja	Algeria	8.76	9.88	9.51	9.88	522	
25	A	Mariel Brokke	Costa Rica	8.32	8.39	7.70	8.39	425	

=== 200 metres ===
Rank	Heat	Name	Nationality	Time	Points	Notes
1	2	Isabel Posch	Austria	23.67	1013	PB
2	2	Tainara Mees	Brazil	24.49	934	
3	2	Julia Słocka	Poland	24.66	918	
4	3	Lydia Boll	Switzerland	24.79	906	PB
5	3	Marta Giovannini	Italy	24.85	901	PB
6	2	Mariel Brokke	Costa Rica	25.04	883	
7	2	Szabina Szűcs	Hungary	25.05	882	
8	2	Yuliya Loban	Ukraine	25.12	876	
9	3	Célia Perron	France	25.13	875	
10	3	Edyta Bielska	Poland	25.18	870	
11	4	Camryn Newton-Smith	Australia	25.23	866	SB
12	3	Chiara-Belinda Schuler	Austria	25.23	866	
13	4	Chen Cai-juan	Chinese Taipei	25.38	852	SB
14	2	Ida Eikeng	Norway	25.60	833	
15	4	Yuri Tanaka	Japan	25.78	817	
16	1	Tara Keber	Slovenia	25.80	815	
17	4	Tanu	India	26.04	794	PB
18	1	Mia Scerri	Australia	26.07	791	
19	3	Afaf Benhadja	Algeria	26.14	785	
20	1	Yin Xinyi	China	26.26	775	SB
21	4	Nikoline Lybæk Petersen	Denmark	26.31	770	
22	1	Kaitlyn McColly	United States	26.45	758	
23	1	Pooja	India	26.89	721	PB
24	4	Jenifer Norberto	Brazil	26.99	713	
–	1	Diana Geints	Kazakhstan	DNS	0	

=== Long jump ===
Rank	Group	Name	Nationality	#1	#2	#3	Result	Points	Notes
1	A	Isabel Posch	Austria	6.38	6.02	–	6.38	969	
2	A	Célia Perron	France	6.20	5.40	x	6.20	912	PB
3	A	Lydia Boll	Switzerland	x	5.72	6.05	6.05	865	
4	A	Szabina Szűcs	Hungary	x	6.03	5.88	6.03	859	
5	A	Edyta Bielska	Poland	x	5.90	5.94	5.94	831	
6	A	Camryn Newton-Smith	Australia	5.84	5.87	5.93	5.93	828	
7	A	Mia Scerri	Australia	5.79	x	5.92	5.92	825	
8	A	Yuliya Loban	Ukraine	5.87	5.90	5.37	5.90	819	
9	B	Chen Cai-juan	Chinese Taipei	5.38	5.76	5.63	5.76	777	
10	B	Julia Słocka	Poland	x	5.71	x	5.71	762	
11	A	Marta Giovannini	Italy	5.66	x	5.69	5.69	756	\
12	A	Chiara-Belinda Schuler	Austria	5.69	x	x	5.69	756	
13	A	Tainara Mees	Brazil	5.06	5.50	5.65	5.65	744	
14	B	Yuri Tanaka	Japan	5.62	5.58	5.39	5.62	735	SB
15	B	Tara Keber	Slovenia	x	5.50	5.54	5.54	715	
16	B	Nikoline Lybæk Petersen	Denmark	x	5.39	5.43	5.43	680	SB
17	B	Yin Xinyi	China	x	5.40	5.31	5.40	671	SB
18	B	Afaf Benhadja	Algeria	x	5.40	4.14	5.40	671	
19	B	Tanu	India	5.30	5.31	5.08	5.31	645	
20	B	Kaitlyn McColly	United States	x	5.27	5.29	5.29	640	
21	B	Pooja	India	5.18	5.16	5.22	5.22	620	
22	B	Mariel Brokke	Costa Rica	4.88	5.03	4.92	5.03	567	
23	B	Jenifer Norberto	Brazil	x	4.78	4.80	4.80	506	
–	A	Ida Eikeng	Norway				DNS	0	

=== Javelin throw ===
Rank	Group	Name	Nationality	#1	#2	#3	Result	Points	Notes
1	A	Yuri Tanaka	Japan	49.34	46.48	49.80	49.80	856	SB
2	A	Chiara-Belinda Schuler	Austria	49.05	49.41	49.13	49.41	849	
3	A	Camryn Newton-Smith	Australia	44.27	44.71	–	44.71	758	
4	A	Lydia Boll	Switzerland	44.45	43.24	37.00	44.45	753	
5	A	Yuliya Loban	Ukraine	44.33	44.28	43.95	44.33	751	
6	A	Julia Słocka	Poland	42.61	40.82	41.56	42.61	717	
7	A	Yin Xinyi	China	42.31	41.25	41.18	42.31	712	SB
8	A	Szabina Szűcs	Hungary	41.04	–	–	41.04	687	SB
9	A	Isabel Posch	Austria	40.91	x	38.76	40.91	685	
10	A	Chen Cai-juan	Chinese Taipei	40.79	x	x	40.79	682	
11	A	Edyta Bielska	Poland	40.65	40.22	39.51	40.65	680	
12	B	Pooja	India	40.26	35.00	37.63	40.26	672	PB
13	B	Tanu	India	36.47	40.14	39.37	40.14	670	SB
14	B	Tainara Mees	Brazil	x	35.51	34.57	35.51	581	
15	B	Mia Scerri	Australia	34.97	35.43	34.94	35.43	580	
16	B	Marta Giovannini	Italy	x	34.90	x	34.90	570	SB
17	B	Nikoline Lybæk Petersen	Denmark	30.74	33.93	34.89	34.89	570	
18	B	Kaitlyn McColly	United States	x	x	34.66	34.66	565	
19	B	Célia Perron	France	x	32.09	33.67	33.67	546	
20	B	Tara Keber	Slovenia	28.88	31.28	32.72	32.72	528	PB
21	B	Afaf Benhadja	Algeria	29.40	x	30.69	30.69	490	
22	B	Jenifer Norberto	Brazil	26.28	x	x	26.28	406	
23	B	Mariel Brokke	Costa Rica	22.80	20.28	21.11	22.80	341	PB
–	A	Ida Eikeng	Norway				DNS	0	

=== 800 metres ===
Rank	Heat	Name	Nationality	Time	Points	Notes
1	3	Célia Perron	France	2:07.81	997	PB
2	3	Edyta Bielska	Poland	2:08.17	992	SB
3	3	Yuliya Loban	Ukraine	2:16.32	874	PB
4	2	Szabina Szűcs	Hungary	2:16.67	869	
5	3	Isabel Posch	Austria	2:16.99	865	PB
6	3	Lydia Boll	Switzerland	2:17.64	856	
7	1	Mariel Brokke	Costa Rica	2:19.30	833	
8	3	Julia Słocka	Poland	2:19.32	833	
9	2	Marta Giovannini	Italy	2:20.49	817	SB
10	2	Afaf Benhadja	Algeria	2:20.52	816	PB
11	2	Mia Scerri	Australia	2:21.88	798	SB
12	1	Pooja	India	2:22.10	795	
13	1	Kaitlyn McColly	United States	2:23.73	774	PB
14	3	Chiara-Belinda Schuler	Austria	2:23.82	772	
15	3	Camryn Newton-Smith	Australia	2:24.35	765	SB
16	1	Tanu	India	2:30.45	687	
17	2	Chen Cai-juan	Chinese Taipei	2:30.97	681	
18	2	Yin Xinyi	China	2:31.35	676	SB
19	1	Jenifer Norberto	Brazil	2:35.41	627	
20	2	Tainara Mees	Brazil	2:38.87	586	
21	1	Tara Keber	Slovenia	2:44.34	524	
22	1	Nikoline Lybæk Petersen	Denmark	2:45.81	508	
–	2	Yuri Tanaka	Japan	DQ	0	TR17.4.3

=== Summary ===
Rank	Name	Nationality	100H	HJ	SP	200	LJ	JT	800	Points	Notes
1st place, gold medalist(s)	Isabel Posch	Austria	1026	830	719	1013	969	685	865	6107	PB
2nd place, silver medalist(s)	Yuliya Loban	Ukraine	990	941	812	876	819	751	874	6063	
3rd place, bronze medalist(s)	Lydia Boll	Switzerland	970	795	778	906	865	753	856	5923	PB
4	Edyta Bielska	Poland	964	903	625	870	831	680	992	5865	
5	Célia Perron	France	974	903	655	875	912	546	997	5862	PB
6	Chiara-Belinda Schuler	Austria	1001	795	749	866	756	849	772	5788	
7	Julia Słocka	Poland	966	795	722	918	762	717	833	5713	
8	Camryn Newton-Smith	Australia	971	830	694	866	828	758	765	5712	
9	Szabina Szűcs	Hungary	945	795	623	882	859	687	869	5660	
10	Chen Cai-juan	Chinese Taipei	952	867	731	852	777	682	681	5542	
11	Marta Giovannini	Italy	1027	830	631	901	756	570	817	5532	
12	Mia Scerri	Australia	875	903	759	791	825	580	798	5531	
13	Tainara Mees	Brazil	994	830	672	934	744	581	586	5341	PB
14	Yin Xinyi	China	902	867	699	775	671	712	676	5302	SB
15	Afaf Benhadja	Algeria	914	941	522	785	671	490	816	5139	
16	Tanu	India	782	795	619	794	645	670	687	4992	
17	Kaitlyn McColly	United States	928	724	560	758	640	565	774	4949	PB
18	Pooja	India	787	724	610	721	620	672	795	4929	
19	Nikoline Lybæk Petersen	Denmark	925	759	596	770	680	570	508	4808	
20	Tara Keber	Slovenia	970	655	591	815	715	528	524	4798	PB
21	Mariel Brokke	Costa Rica	1023	655	425	883	567	341	833	4727	
22	Yuri Tanaka	Japan	909	689	664	817	735	856	0	4670	
23	Jenifer Norberto	Brazil	942	621	659	713	506	406	627	4474	
–	Ida Eikeng	Norway	971	759	731	833	DNS			DNF	
–	Diana Geints	Kazakhstan	678	795	581	DNS				DNF	
