= Athletics at the 2021 Summer World University Games – Men's long jump =

The men's long jump event at the 2021 Summer World University Games was held on 5 and 6 August 2023 at the Shuangliu Sports Centre Stadium in Chengdu, China.

== Medalists ==
Gold	Silver	Bronze
Zhang Jingqiang; China	Wen Hua-yu; Chinese Taipei	Lin Chia-hsing; Chinese Taipei

== Results ==
=== Qualification ===
Qualification: Qualifying performance 8.00 (Q) or at least 12 best performers (q) advance to the final.

Rank	Group	Name	Nationality	#1	#2	#3	Result	Notes
1	A	Shu Heng	China	8.00			8.00	Q
2	A	Wen Hua-yu	Chinese Taipei	7.93	–	–	7.93	q, PB
3	A	Nikithemba Hani	South Africa	x	x	7.80	7.80	q
4	B	Lin Chia-hsing	Chinese Taipei	7.80	x	x	7.80	q
5	A	Mátyás Németh	Hungary	7.79	x	7.50	7.79	q, PB
6	B	Zhang Jingqiang	China	7.76	x	–	7.76	q, SB
7	A	Ko Ho Long	Hong Kong	7.74	x	–	7.74	q
8	B	Marius Bull Hjeltnes	Norway	7.33	7.39	7.69	7.69	q, PB
9	B	Zane Branco	Australia	7.35	x	7.59	7.59	q
10	B	Yuto Toriumi	Japan	x	7.54	7.47	7.54	q
11	B	David Cairo	Netherlands	7.48	x	x	7.48	q
12	B	Romain Didelot	France	x	7.39	7.44	7.44	q
13	A	Ulisses Costa	Brazil	x	x	7.44	7.44	
14	B	Sámuel Hodossy-Takács	Hungary	7.16	7.17	7.43	7.43	PB
15	A	Ishay Ifraimov	Israel	6.87	x	7.42	7.42	
16	B	Asande Mthembu	South Africa	7.25	7.18	7.41	7.41	
17	B	Mateusz Jopek	Poland	7.32	x	7.37	7.37	
18	A	Lee Hyun-woo	South Korea	x	7.23	7.37	7.37	
19	B	Tebogo Moepeng	Botswana	7.03	4.83	7.35	7.35	
20	A	Timur Isakov	Kyrgyzstan	x	x	7.28	7.28	PB
21	B	Aleksandar Askovic	Germany	7.24	7.24	x	7.24	PB
22	B	Jo Hong-jo	South Korea	7.19	6.93	x	7.19	
23	B	Wong Pak Hang	Hong Kong	7.05	7.03	x	7.05	
24	A	Febri Prasetiyo	Indonesia	6.90	7.05	4.94	7.05	
25	B	Bagrat Gasanbekow	Turkmenistan	7.04	x	x	7.04	
26	A	William Freyer	Australia	7.01	6.73	x	7.01	
27	A	Narindra Rafidimalala	Madagascar	x	7.01	x	7.01	
28	A	Maxwell Wordui	Ghana	6.96	6.31	x	6.96	
29	B	Alex Oliveira	Brazil	x	6.87	x	6.87	
30	B	Waisele Inoke	Fiji	6.82	6.84	6.62	6.84	
31	A	Ho Chon Lam	Macau	x	x	6.63	6.63	
–	A	King Ahonkhai	Nigeria	x	x	x	NM	
–	A	Andre Anura	Malaysia	x	r		NM	
–	A	Adem Boualbani	Algeria	x	x	x	NM	
–	A	Nino Celec	Slovenia	x	x	x	NM	
–	B	Lokesh Sathyanathan	India	x	x	x	NM	
–	A	Nazim Babayev	Azerbaijan				DNS	
–	A	Renchard Pagulayan	Philippines				DNS	
–	A	Sajan Rejimon	India				DNS	
–	B	Necati Er	Turkey				DNS	
–	B	Patrick Banda	Zambia				DNS	

=== Final ===
Rank	Name	Nationality	#1	#2	#3	#4	#5	#6	Result	Notes
1st place, gold medalist(s)	Zhang Jingqiang	China	7.44	7.83	7.62	7.93	7.75	x	7.93	SB
2nd place, silver medalist(s)	Wen Hua-yu	Chinese Taipei	7.65	x	7.54	7.55	x	7.83	7.83	
3rd place, bronze medalist(s)	Lin Chia-hsing	Chinese Taipei	x	7.40	x	7.48	x	7.83	7.83	
4	Shu Heng	China	7.67	7.50	7.82	7.69	7.78	7.78	7.82	
5	Yuto Toriumi	Japan	x	7.74	x	x	x	6.75	7.74	SB
6	Ko Ho Long	Hong Kong	7.63	x	x	x	x	7.70	7.70	
7	Nikithemba Hani	South Africa	7.35	7.21	7.55	7.52	7.61	7.59	7.61	
8	Zane Branco	Australia	7.42	7.54	x	x	x	7.45	7.54	
9	Mátyás Németh	Hungary	7.10	x	7.39				7.39	
10	David Cairo	Netherlands	x	x	7.38				7.38	
11	Marius Bull Hjeltnes	Norway	7.27	7.25	7.19				7.27	
12	Romain Didelot	France	x	7.17	7.27				7.27	
