= Norway at the 2021 Summer World University Games =

- Flag of Norway
- IOC code: NOR

in Chengdu, China 28 July 2023 – 8 August 2023
- Competitors: 30 (19 men and 11 women)
- Medals: Gold 0 Silver 0 Bronze 0 Total 0

Summer World University Games appearances
- 1959; 1961; 1963; 1965; 1967; 1970; 1973; 1975; 1977; 1979; 1981; 1983; 1985; 1987; 1989; 1991; 1993; 1995; 1997; 1999; 2001; 2003; 2005; 2007; 2009; 2011; 2013; 2015; 2017; 2019; 2021; 2025; 2027

Norway competed at the 2021 Summer World University Games in Chengdu, China held from 28 July to 8 August 2023.

== Competitors ==
Sport	Men	Women	Total
Artistic gymnastics	1	0	1
Athletics	10	10	20
Diving	0	1	1
Fencing	4	0	4
Rowing	1	0	1
Table tennis	3	0	3
Total	19	11	30

== Artistic gymnastics ==
Men

Athlete	Event	Qualification								Final							
Athlete	Event	Apparatus						Total	Rank	Apparatus						Total	Rank
Athlete	Event	F	PH	R	V	PB	HB	Total	Rank	F	PH	R	V	PB	HB	Total	Rank
Fredrik Bjørnevik Aas	All-around	12.566	11.666	11.866	12.966	12.466	12.766	74.296	45	Did not advance							

== Athletics ==
Men
Track

Athlete	Event	Heat		Semi-finals		Final	
Athlete	Event	Result	Rank	Result	Rank	Result	Rank
Henrik Marius Laukli	5000 metres	15:02.63	18	—		Did not advance	
Henrik Marius Laukli	Half marathon	—				1:07:05	15
Even Meinseth	100 metres	10.52	15 Q	10.43	19	Did not advance	
Even Meinseth	200 metres	Did not start					
Fredrik Øvereng	400 metres	47.46	18 q	47.53	18	Did not advance	
Ole Jakob Solbu	800 metres	1:50.81	13 Q	1:48.41	12	Did not advance	
Sigurd Tveit	800 metres	1:49.94	4 q	Did not finish		Did not advance	
Sigurd Tveit	1500 metres	3:45.90	9	—		Did not advance	
Jacob Vaula	100 metres	10.59	22 q	10.41	17	Did not advance	

Field

Athlete	Event	Qualification		Final	
Athlete	Event	Result	Rank	Result	Rank
Viljar Helgestad Gjerde	Triple jump	14.36	20	Did not advance	
Marius Bull Hjeltnes	Long jump	7.69	8 q	7.27	11
Håkon Litland	Hammer throw	63.54	14	Did not advance	

Combined events

Athlete	Event		100 m	LJ	SP	HJ	400 m	110H	DT	PV	JT	1500 m	Final	Rank
Gjert Høie Sjursen	Decathlon	Result	11.05	7.20 PB	12.70	1.78	50.01	14.72	41.26 SB	4.00	51.51	4:51.12	7199	5
Gjert Høie Sjursen	Decathlon	Points	850	862	649	610	814	884	690	617	611	612	7199	5

Women
Track

Athlete	Event	Heat		Semi-finals		Final	
Athlete	Event	Result	Rank	Result	Rank	Result	Rank
Vilde Aasmo	100 metres	11.97	24 Q	11.96	21	Did not advance	
Malin Edland	1500 metres	4:30.23	16	—		Did not advance	
Amanda Marie Frøynes	800 metres	2:08.19	9	—		Did not advance	
Marte Lien Johnsen	10,000 metres	—				37:24.06	13
Malin Ingeborg Nyfors	800 metres	2:07.13	4 q	—		2:08.58	8
Marte Pettersen	100 metres	11.91	21	Did not advance			
Marte Pettersen	200 metres	23.92	11 Q	23.87	12	Did not advance	
Amalie Sæten	1500 metres	4:25.26	7	—		Did not advance	
Amalie Sæten	5000 metres	17:11.33	10 Q	—		16:08.90	4
Laura van der Veen	200 metres	24.76 SB	30	Did not advance			
Laura van der Veen	400 metres	55.93	16 q	55.79	16	Did not advance	

Field

Athlete	Event	Qualification		Final	
Athlete	Event	Result	Rank	Result	Rank
Thale Leirfall Bremset	Long jump	5.82	17	Did not advance	
Ida Eikeng	Javelin throw	48.06	13	Did not advance	

Combined events

Athlete	Event		100H	HJ	SP	200 m	LJ	JT	800 m	Final	Rank
Ida Eikeng	Heptathlon	Result	14.05	1.62	13.05	25.60	DNS			DNF	
Ida Eikeng	Heptathlon	Points	971	759	731	833	—			DNF	

== Diving ==
Athlete	Event	Preliminaries		Semifinals		Final	
Athlete	Event	Points	Rank	Points	Rank	Points	Rank
Elma Galaasen Lund	Women's 10 metre platform	226.95	8 Q	203.85	9 Q	216.80	8
Elma Galaasen Lund	Women's team	—				226.95	13

== Fencing ==
Athlete	Event	Group stage							Round of 128	Round of 64	Round of 32	Round of 16	Quarter-finals	Semi-finals	Final / BM	
Athlete	Event	Opponent score	Opponent score	Opponent score	Opponent score	Opponent score	Opponent score	Rank	Opponent score	Opponent score	Opponent score	Opponent score	Opponent score	Opponent score	Opponent score	Rank
Svend Markus Eeg	Men's individual épée	Pavlík (CZE); L 3–5	Tychler (RSA); L 3–4	Gorbachuk (UKR); L 1–5	Kwon (KOR); L 2–5	Wang (CHN); L 3–5	Veenenbos (NED); L 3–4	93	Did not advance							
Tomas Vincens Geitung	Men's individual épée	Joseph (USA); W 5–1	Tulen (NED); L 3–4	Neer (IND); W 5–1	Jutila (FIN); W 5–4	Mahringer (AUT); L 1–5	Jean-Joseph (FRA); W 5–4	34 Q	Bye	Paolini (ITA); L 9–15	Did not advance					
Arthur Nepomuk Grosse	Men's individual épée	Müller (SUI); W 5–4	Akhtamov (UZB); W 5–3	Masuda (JPN); L 4–5	Rubeš (CZE); W 5–3	Bielec (POL); L 1–3	Dashdamirov (AZE); W 5–1	34 Q	Bye	Berktold (AUT); W 15–11	Mencarelli (ITA); L 10–15	Did not advance				
Truls Straumøy	Men's individual épée	Paolini (ITA); W 5–1	Kovács (HUN); L 4–5	Tinnikov (KAZ); L 3–5	Baler (SLO); L 4–5	An (KOR); L 2–5	Chong (SGP); L 4–5	84	Did not advance							
Svend Markus Eeg; Tomas Vincens Geitung; Arthur Nepomuk Grosse; Truls Straumøy	Men's tean épée	—									India (IND); W 43–29	France (FRA); L 36–45	Did not advance			

== Rowing ==
Men

Athlete	Event	Heats		Repechage		Semi-finals		Finals	
Athlete	Event	Time	Rank	Time	Rank	Time	Rank	Time	Rank
Oskar Martinius Gjerland	Single sculls	7:25.25	3 R	7:25.01	2 SA	7:34.42	5 FB	7:19.80	4

== Table tennis ==
Singles

Athlete	Event	Group round				Round of 64	Round of 32	Round of 16	Quarterfinal	Semifinal	Final / BM	
Athlete	Event	Opposition Result	Opposition Result	Opposition Result	Rank	Opposition Result	Opposition Result	Opposition Result	Opposition Result	Opposition Result	Opposition Result	Rank
Sondre Berner	Men's singles	Cheong (MAC); L 1–3	Srivastava (IND); L 1–3	Tsang (HKG); L 1–3	4	Did not advance						
Fredrik Meringdal	Men's singles	Oráč (SVK); W 3–1	Mihalovity (HUN); L 1–3	Saadawi (QAT); W 3–0	2 Q	Hardmeier (SUI); L 2–4	Did not advance					
Finn Vetvik	Men's singles	Schultz (NED); W 3–0	Yaghesmat (IRI); W 3–1	Miyagawa (JPN); L 0–3	2 Q	Ho (HKG); L 1–4	Did not advance					
Sondre Berner; Finn Vetvik	Men's doubles	—				Dani / Do Rosario (IND); W 3–2	Huang / Yang (TPE); L 0–3	Did not advance				
Sondre Berner; Finn Vetvik; Fredrik Meringdal	Men's team	Hong Kong (HKG); L 0–3	Germany (GER); L 0–3	—	3	Did not advance						
