= Athletics at the 2021 Summer World University Games – Women's 100 metres =

The women's 100 metres event at the 2021 Summer World University Games was held on 1 and 2 August 2023 at the Shuangliu Sports Centre Stadium in Chengdu, China.

== Medalists ==
Gold	Silver	Bronze
Patrizia van der Weken; Luxembourg	Viktória Forster; Slovakia	Magdalena Lindner; Austria

== Results ==
=== Round 1 ===
Qualification: First 3 in each heat (Q) and the next 3 fastest (q) advance to semifinal.

Rank	Heat	Name	Nationality	Time	Notes
1	5	Liang Xiaojing	China	11.34	Q
2	7	Patrizia van der Weken	Luxembourg	11.45	Q
3	7	Talea Prepens	Germany	11.49	Q
4	4	Phindile Kubheka	South Africa	11.49	Q
5	4	Viktória Forster	Slovakia	11.50	Q
6	4	Mickaell Moodie	Jamaica	11.52	Q
7	7	Samantha Geddes	Australia	11.54	Q
8	2	Magdalena Lindner	Austria	11.58	Q
9	3	Gabriela Mourão	Brazil	11.58	Q
10	5	Yuna Miura	Japan	11.59	Q
11	1	Anny de Bassi	Brazil	11.61	Q
12	2	Avantika Narale	India	11.63	Q
13	1	Simay Özçiftçi	Turkey	11.64	Q, PB
14	1	Loi Im Lan	Macau	11.66	Q
15	1	Céline Bürgi	Switzerland	11.67	q
16	2	Mary Boakye	Ghana	11.73	Q
17	2	Monika Romaszko	Poland	11.75	q
18	6	Chan Pui Kei	Hong Kong	11.81	Q
19	1	Amasha De Silva	Sri Lanka	11.89	q
20	6	Coralie Ambrosini	Switzerland	11.90	Q
21	7	Marte Pettersen	Norway	11.91	
22	6	Paulina Paluch	Poland	11.96	Q
23	1	Toni Canfall	United States	11.97	
24	5	Vilde Aasmo	Norway	11.97	Q
25	3	Leung Kwan Yi	Hong Kong	11.98	Q
26	6	Elizabeth-Ann Tan	Singapore	12.00	
27	4	Elif Polat	Turkey	12.01	
28	3	Yu Ishikawa	Japan	12.02	Q
29	3	Sudeshna Shivankar	India	12.02	
30	2	Liu Li-lin	Chinese Taipei	12.03	
31	7	Zheng Xin-ying	Chinese Taipei	12.03	
32	4	Jacent Nyamahunge	Uganda	12.10	
33	5	Nur Aishah Rofina Aling	Malaysia	12.20	
34	2	Victoria Aransiola	Nigeria	12.21	
35	5	Boitshepo Moloi	Botswana	12.22	
36	7	Camilla Høgh Sørensen	Denmark	12.27	
37	6	Kim Ju-ha	South Korea	12.39	
38	2	Sonita Kamara	Sierra Leone	12.49	
39	7	Tshepang Manyika	Botswana	12.59	
40	1	Jane Ndihuri	Kenya	12.64	PB
41	6	Djamila Zine	Algeria	12.80	
42	6	Leoni Adams	Guyana	12.80	
43	4	Lushomo Mukakanga	Zambia	12.84	
44	5	Tinuade Adekola	Nigeria	13.03	
45	4	Azza Al-Yarubi	Oman	13.11	
46	1	Lujai Al-Humaid	Saudi Arabia	13.13	PB
47	3	Alsu Habibulina	Turkmenistan	13.15	
48	2	Pamela Anguparu	Uganda	13.61	
49	5	Aisha Farage	The Gambia	13.64	
50	3	Nasra Abukar Ali	Somalia	21.81	
–	5	Tamzin Thomas	South Africa	DQ	TR16.8
–	3	Souliatou Rabiou	Mali	DNS	

=== Semifinal ===
Qualification: First 2 in each heat (Q) and the next 2 fastest (q) advance to final.

Rank	Heat	Name	Nationality	Time	Notes
1	1	Patrizia van der Weken	Luxembourg	11.24	Q
2	2	Viktória Forster	Slovakia	11.37	Q
3	2	Magdalena Lindner	Austria	11.41	Q, SB
4	3	Liang Xiaojing	China	11.43	Q
5	1	Talea Prepens	Germany	11.47	Q
6	2	Samantha Geddes	Australia	11.49	q
7	1	Monika Romaszko	Poland	11.57	q
8	2	Mickaell Moodie	Jamaica	11.58	
9	1	Yuna Miura	Japan	11.59	SB
10	3	Anny de Bassi	Brazil	11.61	Q
11	1	Gabriela Mourão	Brazil	11.62	
12	3	Simay Özçiftçi	Turkey	11.63	PB
13	2	Céline Bürgi	Switzerland	11.67	
14	3	Mary Boakye	Ghana	11.68	SB
15	1	Loi Im Lan	Macau	11.70	
16	2	Avantika Narale	India	11.70	
17	3	Chan Pui Kei	Hong Kong	11.80	
18	3	Paulina Paluch	Poland	11.90	
19	3	Coralie Ambrosini	Switzerland	11.93	
20	2	Yu Ishikawa	Japan	11.95	
21	1	Vilde Aasmo	Norway	11.96	
22	2	Phindile Kubheka	South Africa	12.08	
23	1	Leung Kwan Yi	Hong Kong	12.51	
–	3	Amasha De Silva	Sri Lanka	DNS	

=== Final ===
Rank	Name	Nationality	Time	Notes
1st place, gold medalist(s)	Patrizia van der Weken	Luxembourg	11.22	
2nd place, silver medalist(s)	Viktória Forster	Slovakia	11.34	
3rd place, bronze medalist(s)	Magdalena Lindner	Austria	11.44	
4	Samantha Geddes	Australia	11.46	PB
5	Liang Xiaojing	China	11.48	
6	Talea Prepens	Germany	11.59	
7	Monika Romaszko	Poland	11.61	
8	Anny de Bassi	Brazil	11.66	
