= Athletics at the 2021 Summer World University Games – Men's 3000 metres steeplechase =

The men's 3000 metres steeplechase event at the 2021 Summer World University Games was held on 1 and 3 August 2023 at the Shuangliu Sports Centre Stadium in Chengdu, China.

== Medalists ==
Gold	Silver	Bronze
Jens Mergenthaler; Germany	Nick Jäger; Germany	Atsushi Shobu; Japan

== Results ==
=== Round 1 ===
Qualification: First 7 in each heat (Q) advance to final.

==== Heat 1 ====
Rank	Athlete	Nation	Time	Notes
1	Omar Seraiche	Algeria	8:58.89	Q
2	Zhang Yue	China	9:01.40	Q, PB
3	Nick Jäger	Germany	9:03.86	Q
4	Atsushi Shobu	Japan	9:04.54	Q
5	Loris Pellaz	Switzerland	9:05.37	Q
6	Park Won-been	South Korea	9:27.77	Q
7	Lovro Nedeljković	Croatia	9:45.92	Q
—	Shubham Bhandare	India	DNF	
—	Abdelhakim Abouzouhir	Morocco	DNS	

==== Heat 2 ====
Rank	Athlete	Nation	Time	Notes
1	Liam Cashin	Australia	8:59.90	Q
2	Wang Fudong	China	9:00.24	Q
3	Jens Mergenthaler	Germany	9:02.73	Q
4	Damián Vích	Czech Republic	9:04.73	Q
5	Baptiste Guyon	France	9:04.97	Q
6	Matthew Forrester	South Africa	9:07.49	Q
7	Abdullah Tuğluk	Turkey	9:10.48	Q
8	Siddhant Pujari	India	9:14.76	
9	Klemen Vihar	Slovenia	9:40.98	qJ

=== Final ===
Rank	Athlete	Nation	Time	Notes
1st place, gold medalist(s)	Jens Mergenthaler	Germany	8:38.42	
2nd place, silver medalist(s)	Nick Jäger	Germany	8:40.53	
3rd place, bronze medalist(s)	Atsushi Shobu	Japan	8:40.84	
4	Damián Vích	Czech Republic	8:41.50	
5	Omar Seraiche	Algeria	8:43.63	
6	Baptiste Guyon	France	8:47.19	
7	Loris Pellaz	Switzerland	8:49.06	PB
8	Liam Cashin	Australia	8:55.38	
9	Wang Fudong	China	9:00.98	
10	Matthew Forrester	South Africa	9:03.85	
11	Park Won-been	South Korea	9:09.68	
12	Zhang Yue	China	9:19.06	
13	Klemen Vihar	Slovenia	9:27.84	
—	Abdullah Tuğluk	Turkey	DNF	
—	Lovro Nedeljković	Croatia	DNF	
