= Athletics at the 2021 Summer World University Games – Men's 110 metres hurdles =

The men's 110 metres hurdles event at the 2021 Summer World University Games was held on 4 and 5 August 2023 at the Shuangliu Sports Centre Stadium in Chengdu, China.

== Medalists ==
Gold	Silver	Bronze
Ken Toyoda; Japan	Ning Xiaohan; China	Krzysztof Kiljan; Poland

== Results ==
=== Round 1 ===
Qualification: First 2 in each heat (Q) and the next 2 fastest (q) advance to final.

==== Heat 1 ====
Rank	Lane	Athlete	Nation	Time	Notes
1	6	Takumi Miyazaki	Japan	13.53	Q
2	3	David Yefremov	Kazakhstan	13.56	Q
3	4	Krzysztof Kiljan	Poland	13.58	q
4	7	Santeri Kuusiniemi	Finland	13.72	
5	2	Mathieu Jaquet	Switzerland	13.81	
6	5	Cheung Siu Hang	Hong Kong	13.89	
7	8	Roshan Ranatunga	Sri Lanka	14.08	
Source:				Wind: +2.4 m/s	

==== Heat 2 ====
Rank	Lane	Athlete	Nation	Time	Notes
1	5	Ken Toyoda	Japan	13.29	Q, PB
2	6	Mikdat Sevler	Turkey	13.51	Q
3	2	Filip Jakob Demšar	Slovenia	13.60	q, PB
4	7	Christos-Panagiotis Roumtsios	Greece	13.93	PB
5	3	Jason October	South Africa	14.07	
6	8	Adrian Vieira	Brazil	14.13	
7	4	Adedigba Oluwakorede	Nigeria	16.01	
Source:				Wind: +1.1 m/s	

==== Heat 3 ====
Rank	Lane	Athlete	Nation	Time	Notes
1	6	Natthaphon Dansungnoen	Thailand	13.65	Q, PB
2	4	Ning Xiaohan	China	13.68	Q
3	7	Jakub Szymański	Poland	13.70	
4	3	Mohd Rizzua Haizad Muhamad	Malaysia	13.99	
5	8	Davonte Vanterpool	United States	14.21	
6	2	Addis Wong Lok Hei	Hong Kong	14.29	
7	5	Richárd Nagy	Hungary	14.59	
Source:				Wind: -0.2 m/s	

=== Final ===
Rank	Lane	Athlete	Nation	Time	Notes
1st place, gold medalist(s)	6	Ken Toyoda	Japan	13.40	
2nd place, silver medalist(s)	8	Ning Xiaohan	China	13.44	PB
3rd place, bronze medalist(s)	2	Krzysztof Kiljan	Poland	13.55	
4	5	Mikdat Sevler	Turkey	13.62	
5	9	Filip Jakob Demšar	Slovenia	13.63	
6	3	David Yefremov	Kazakhstan	13.63	
7	7	Natthaphon Dansungnoen	Thailand	13.71	
8	4	Takumi Miyazaki	Japan	13.83	
Source:				Wind: -0.2 m/s	
