= Athletics at the 2021 Summer World University Games – Men's decathlon =

The men's decathlon event at the 2021 Summer World University Games was held on 2 and 3 August 2023 at the Shuangliu Sports Centre Stadium in Chengdu, China.

== Medalists ==
Gold	Silver	Bronze
Vilém Stráský; Czech Republic	Edgaras Benkunskas; Lithuania	Alec Diamond; Australia

== Results ==
=== 100 metres ===
Rank	Heat	Name	Nationality	Time	Points	Notes
1	1	Vilém Stráský	Czech Republic	10.80	906	PB
2	1	Jannis Wolff	Germany	10.84	897	SB
3	1	Pedro de Oliveira	Brazil	10.88	888	SB
4	2	Wang Zhipeng	China	10.94	874	PB
5	1	Chen Yesen	China	10.94	874	PB
6	3	Alec Diamond	Australia	10.99	863	SB
7	3	Henrique Motta	Brazil	10.99	863	
8	3	Stalin Joes	India	11.02	856	PB
9	1	Gjert Høie Sjursen	Norway	11.05	850	
10	1	Jesse Perez	South Africa	11.10	838	
11	3	Edgaras Benkunskas	Lithuania	11.12	834	
12	3	Sutthisak Singkhon	Thailand	11.13	832	SB
13	1	Colby Eddowes	Australia	11.21	814	
14	2	Yaman Deep	India	11.42	769	
15	2	Ting Sheng-hsuan	Chinese Taipei	11.79	693	
16	3	Wang Chen-yu	Chinese Taipei	12.07	637	
17	2	Jose Crisostomo	Philippines	12.20	612	
18	2	Hadyn Bieling	United States	12.32	589	
19	2	Jonas Bjerremand	Denmark	18.74	0	

=== Long Jump ===
Rank	Group	Name	Nationality	#1	#2	#3	Result	Points	Notes
1	A	Alec Diamond	Australia	7.17	7.27	7.54	7.54	945	
2	A	Jesse Perez	South Africa	7.31	7.33	7.39	7.39	908	
3	B	Pedro de Oliveira	Brazil	6.84	7.38	7.21	7.38	905	SB
4	A	Colby Eddowes	Australia	7.30	7.15	x	7.30	886	
5	A	Jannis Wolff	Germany	x	6.65	7.30	7.30	886	PB
6	A	Vilém Stráský	Czech Republic	x	7.26	7.26	7.26	876	SB
7	A	Chen Yesen	China	7.21	7.07	–	7.21	864	PB
8	A	Sutthisak Singkhon	Thailand	7.21	6.98	x	7.21	864	
9	A	Gjert Høie Sjursen	Norway	6.71	7.02	7.20	7.20	862	PB
10	B	Wang Zhipeng	China	7.06	x	–	7.06	828	PB
11	B	Yaman Deep	India	6.51	6.39	6.79	6.79	764	
12	B	Edgaras Benkunskas	Lithuania	6.59	6.46	6.48	6.59	718	
13	B	Ting Sheng-hsuan	Chinese Taipei	x	6.50	6.38	6.50	697	
14	B	Henrique Motta	Brazil	x	6.42	x	6.42	679	
15	A	Stalin Joes	India	x	x	6.32	6.32	657	
16	B	Jose Crisostomo	Philippines	4.96	5.65	x	5.65	512	
17	B	Hadyn Bieling	United States	x	5.63	x	5.63	508	
–	B	Jonas Bjerremand	Denmark	x	–	–	NM	0	
–	A	Wang Chen-yu	Chinese Taipei	x	–	–	NM	0	

=== Shot Put ===
Rank	Group	Name	Nationality	#1	#2	#3	Result	Points	Notes
1	A	Edgaras Benkunskas	Lithuania	13.21	13.76	14.83	14.83	779	
2	A	Sutthisak Singkhon	Thailand	14.14	x	14.33	14.33	749	
3	A	Jonas Bjerremand	Denmark	13.16	x	14.01	14.01	729	
4	A	Alec Diamond	Australia	13.61	13.67	13.39	13.67	708	
5	A	Vilém Stráský	Czech Republic	13.36	13.50	13.56	13.56	701	
6	A	Chen Yesen	China	11.17	12.57	13.37	13.37	690	PB
7	B	Jesse Perez	South Africa	12.88	x	x	12.88	660	PB
8	A	Jannis Wolff	Germany	x	x	12.79	12.79	654	
9	A	Gjert Høie Sjursen	Norway	11.44	x	12.70	12.70	649	
10	B	Ting Sheng-hsuan	Chinese Taipei	12.42	11.97	12.11	12.42	632	
11	A	Pedro de Oliveira	Brazil	11.83	12.28	x	12.28	623	
12	B	Wang Chen-yu	Chinese Taipei	9.55	12.19	r	12.19	618	
13	B	Stalin Joes	India	11.11	11.97	11.16	11.97	605	PB
14	B	Jose Crisostomo	Philippines	10.88	9.89	11.04	11.04	548	
15	B	Colby Eddowes	Australia	10.72	11.03	10.97	11.03	548	
16	B	Henrique Motta	Brazil	10.99	10.36	x	10.99	545	
17	B	Yaman Deep	India	9.24	10.64	x	10.64	524	
18	B	Hadyn Bieling	United States	10.22	9.31	9.83	10.22	499	
–	A	Wang Zhipeng	China				DNS	0	

=== High Jump ===
Rank	Group	Name	Nationality	1.60	1.63	1.66	1.69	1.72	1.75	1.78	1.81	1.84	Result	Points	Notes
Rank	Group	Name	Nationality	1.87	1.90	1.93	1.96	1.99	2.02	2.05	2.08	2.11	Result	Points	Notes
1	A	Chen Yesen	China	–	–	–	–	–	–	o	–	o	2.08	878	PB
1	A	Chen Yesen	China	–	o	–	o	o	xo	xo	xo	r	2.08	878	PB
2	A	Edgaras Benkunskas	Lithuania	–	–	–	–	–	–	–	–	–	2.08	878	
2	A	Edgaras Benkunskas	Lithuania	–	–	o	xo	o	xxo	o	xxo	xxr	2.08	878	
3	A	Vilém Stráský	Czech Republic	–	–	–	–	–	–	–	–	o	1.99	794	PB
3	A	Vilém Stráský	Czech Republic	o	o	xo	xxo	o	xxx				1.99	794	PB
4	A	Alec Diamond	Australia	–	–	–	–	–	–	–	–	o	1.96	767	SB
4	A	Alec Diamond	Australia	–	o	xo	xxo	xxx					1.96	767	SB
5	A	Yaman Deep	India	–	–	–	–	–	o	x–	o	–	1.93	740	
5	A	Yaman Deep	India	o	o	xxo	xxx						1.93	740	
6	A	Jesse Perez	South Africa	–	–	–	–	–	–	–	–	–	1.93	740	
6	A	Jesse Perez	South Africa	o	xo	xo	xxx						1.93	740	
7	B	Pedro de Oliveira	Brazil	–	–	–	–	–	xxo	–	o	o	1.87	687	SB
7	B	Pedro de Oliveira	Brazil	xo	xxx								1.87	687	SB
8	B	Sutthisak Singkhon	Thailand	–	–	–	–	–	–	–	xo	xxo	1.87	687	
8	B	Sutthisak Singkhon	Thailand	o	xxx								1.87	687	
9	B	Ting Sheng-hsuan	Chinese Taipei	–	–	–	–	–	–	o	o	o	1.84	661	
9	B	Ting Sheng-hsuan	Chinese Taipei	xxx									1.84	661	
10	A	Hadyn Bieling	United States	–	–	–	–	–	–	o	–	xo	1.84	661	
10	A	Hadyn Bieling	United States	–	–	xxx							1.84	661	
11	B	Jannis Wolff	Germany	–	–	–	–	–	–	–	xxo	–	1.81	636	
11	B	Jannis Wolff	Germany	xxx									1.81	636	
12	B	Gjert Høie Sjursen	Norway	–	–	–	o	–	o	o	xxx		1.78	610	
12	B	Stalin Joes	India	–	–	–	o	–	o	o	xxx		1.78	610	
14	B	Jose Crisostomo	Philippines	xo	xxo	xxx							1.63	488	
–	A	Jonas Bjerremand	Denmark										DNS	0	
–	A	Henrique Motta	Brazil										DNS	0	
–	A	Colby Eddowes	Australia										DNS	0	
–	B	Wang Chen-yu	Chinese Taipei										DNS	0	
–	B	Wang Zhipeng	China										DNS	0	

=== 400 metres ===
Rank	Heat	Name	Nationality	Time	Points	Notes
1	3	Alec Diamond	Australia	48.77	872	SB
2	3	Pedro de Oliveira	Brazil	48.83	869	
3	3	Jesse Perez	South Africa	48.87	867	
4	3	Vilém Stráský	Czech Republic	49.47	839	
5	2	Yaman Deep	India	49.98	816	SB
6	3	Gjert Høie Sjursen	Norway	50.01	814	
7	2	Edgaras Benkunskas	Lithuania	50.23	804	
8	1	Chen Yesen	China	50.60	787	SB
9	3	Stalin Joes	India	50.68	784	
10	1	Ting Sheng-hsuan	Chinese Taipei	53.46	662	
11	2	Sutthisak Singkhon	Thailand	54.64	613	
12	1	Jose Crisostomo	Philippines	56.46	541	
–	2	Jannis Wolff	Germany	DQ	0	TR17.4.3
–	1	Jonas Bjerremand	Denmark	DNS	0	
–	1	Colby Eddowes	Australia	DNS	0	
–	1	Hadyn Bieling	United States	DNS	0	
–	2	Henrique Motta	Brazil	DNS	0	
–	2	Wang Chen-yu	Chinese Taipei	DNS	0	
–	3	Wang Zhipeng	China	DNS	0	

=== 110 metres hurdles ===
Rank	Heat	Name	Nationality	Time	Points	Notes
1	1	Vilém Stráský	Czech Republic	14.21	948	
2	1	Chen Yesen	China	14.59	900	PB
3	1	Edgaras Benkunskas	Lithuania	14.66	891	
4	1	Gjert Høie Sjursen	Norway	14.72	884	
5	2	Pedro de Oliveira	Brazil	14.86	867	SB
6	1	Alec Diamond	Australia	14.98	852	
7	1	Sutthisak Singkhon	Thailand	15.22	823	
8	2	Ting Sheng-hsuan	Chinese Taipei	15.46	795	
9	1	Yaman Deep	India	15.49	791	
10	2	Jesse Perez	South Africa	15.53	787	
11	2	Stalin Joes	India	16.27	703	
12	2	Jose Crisostomo	Philippines	17.72	551	
–	2	Jannis Wolff	Germany	DNS	0	
–	2	Hadyn Bieling	United States	DNS	0	

=== Discus Throw ===
Rank	Name	Nationality	#1	#2	#3	Result	Points	Notes
1	Edgaras Benkunskas	Lithuania	45.95	x	x	45.95	786	
2	Sutthisak Singkhon	Thailand	45.08	x	41.81	45.08	768	SB
3	Alec Diamond	Australia	42.05	x	44.29	44.29	752	
4	Gjert Høie Sjursen	Norway	35.45	41.26	x	41.26	690	SB
5	Vilém Stráský	Czech Republic	39.25	39.68	40.59	40.59	677	
6	Pedro de Oliveira	Brazil	40.04	x	x	40.04	665	
7	Chen Yesen	China	38.80	x	36.75	38.80	640	
8	Ting Sheng-hsuan	Chinese Taipei	35.80	36.79	36.32	36.79	600	PB
9	Yaman Deep	India	35.31	35.15	35.27	35.31	570	
10	Jose Crisostomo	Philippines	x	29.89	31.80	31.80	500	
11	Stalin Joes	India	30.32	27.45	x	30.32	471	
12	Jesse Perez	South Africa	x	24.60	x	24.60	359	
–	Hadyn Bieling	United States				DNS	0	
–	Jannis Wolff	Germany				DNS	0	

=== Pole Vault ===
Rank	Group	Name	Nationality	3.20	3.30	3.40	3.50	3.60	3.70	3.80	3.90	4.00	Result	Points	Notes
Rank	Group	Name	Nationality	4.10	4.20	4.30	4.40	4.50	4.60	4.70	4.80		Result	Points	Notes
1	A	Chen Yesen	China	–	–	–	–	–	–	o	–	–	4.70	819	PB
1	A	Chen Yesen	China	o	–	o	o	xxo	o	xxo	xxx		4.70	819	PB
2	A	Vilém Stráský	Czech Republic	–	–	–	–	–	–	–	–	–	4.70	819	PB
2	A	Vilém Stráský	Czech Republic	–	–	–	o	–	o	xo	xxx		4.70	819	PB
3	A	Alec Diamond	Australia	–	–	–	–	–	–	–	–	–	4.60	790	SB
3	A	Alec Diamond	Australia	–	o	–	o	o	o	xxx			4.60	790	SB
4	A	Edgaras Benkunskas	Lithuania	–	–	–	–	–	–	–	–	–	4.50	760	
4	A	Edgaras Benkunskas	Lithuania	–	o	o	o	xo	xxx				4.50	760	
5	A	Ting Sheng-hsuan	Chinese Taipei	–	–	–	–	–	–	–	–	–	4.20	673	
5	A	Ting Sheng-hsuan	Chinese Taipei	–	o	xxx							4.20	673	
6	B	Jesse Perez	South Africa	–	–	–	–	–	–	–	–	o	4.20	673	
6	B	Jesse Perez	South Africa	–	xo	–	xxx						4.20	673	
7	A	Yaman Deep	India	–	–	–	–	–	–	–	–	–	4.20	673	
7	A	Yaman Deep	India	–	xo	xxx							4.20	673	
8	B	Gjert Høie Sjursen	Norway	–	–	–	–	o	–	o	o	o	4.00	617	
8	B	Gjert Høie Sjursen	Norway	xxx									4.00	617	
9	B	Stalin Joes	India	–	–	–	o	–	–	o	–	xo	4.00	617	
9	B	Stalin Joes	India	–	xxx								4.00	617	
10	B	Jose Crisostomo	Philippines	xo	–	o	o	xo	xxx				3.60	509	
11	B	Pedro de Oliveira	Brazil	–	–	o	xxx						3.40	457	
–	A	Jannis Wolff	Germany										DNS	0	
–	B	Sutthisak Singkhon	Thailand										DNS	0	
–	B	Hadyn Bieling	United States										DNS	0	

=== Javelin Throw ===
Rank	Name	Nationality	#1	#2	#3	Result	Points	Notes
1	Edgaras Benkunskas	Lithuania	62.10	60.87	62.43	62.43	774	
2	Vilém Stráský	Czech Republic	57.12	56.61	x	57.12	695	PB
3	Ting Sheng-hsuan	Chinese Taipei	46.94	53.90	53.32	53.90	647	PB
4	Alec Diamond	Australia	52.61	51.96	x	52.61	627	SB
5	Gjert Høie Sjursen	Norway	48.47	46.43	51.51	51.51	611	
6	Chen Yesen	China	50.15	47.16	x	50.15	591	
7	Pedro de Oliveira	Brazil	41.45	48.80	48.23	48.80	571	
8	Yaman Deep	India	43.17	45.36	47.28	47.28	548	
9	Jesse Perez	South Africa	42.68	43.47	39.91	43.47	493	
10	Jose Crisostomo	Philippines	37.07	40.12	37.40	40.12	444	
11	Stalin Joes	India	x	38.13	x	38.13	415	
–	Hadyn Bieling	United States				DNS	0	
–	Jannis Wolff	Germany				DNS	0	
–	Sutthisak Singkhon	Thailand				DNS	0	

=== 1500 metres ===
Rank	Name	Nationality	Time	Points	Notes
1	Yaman Deep	India	4:36.54	702	
2	Stalin Joes	India	4:40.84	675	
3	Vilém Stráský	Czech Republic	4:41.57	670	
4	Pedro de Oliveira	Brazil	4:43.35	659	SB
5	Edgaras Benkunskas	Lithuania	4:44.08	655	
6	Alec Diamond	Australia	4:47.15	636	SB
7	Chen Yesen	China	4:48.47	628	PB
8	Gjert Høie Sjursen	Norway	4:51.12	612	
9	Jesse Perez	South Africa	4:52.64	603	
10	Ting Sheng-hsuan	Chinese Taipei	5:19.60	452	
11	Jose Crisostomo	Philippines	5:25.60	421	

=== Summary ===
Rank	Name	Nationality	100	LJ	SP	HJ	400	110H	DT	PV	JT	1500	Points	Notes
1st place, gold medalist(s)	Vilém Stráský	Czech Republic	906	876	701	794	839	948	677	819	695	670	7925	PB
2nd place, silver medalist(s)	Edgaras Benkunskas	Lithuania	834	718	779	878	804	891	786	760	774	655	7879	
3rd place, bronze medalist(s)	Alec Diamond	Australia	863	945	708	767	872	852	752	790	627	636	7812	SB
4	Chen Yesen	China	874	864	690	878	787	900	640	819	591	628	7671	PB
5	Gjert Høie Sjursen	Norway	850	862	649	610	814	884	690	617	611	612	7199	
6	Pedro de Oliveira	Brazil	888	905	623	623	869	867	665	457	571	659	7191	SB
7	Jesse Perez	South Africa	838	908	660	740	867	787	359	673	493	603	6928	
8	Yaman Deep	India	769	764	524	740	816	791	570	673	548	702	6897	
9	Ting Sheng-hsuan	Chinese Taipei	693	697	632	661	662	795	600	673	647	452	6512	
10	Stalin Joes	India	856	657	605	610	610	703	471	617	415	675	6393	
11	Jose Crisostomo	Philippines	612	512	548	488	541	551	500	509	444	421	5126	SB
–	Sutthisak Singkhon	Thailand	832	864	749	687	613	823	768	DNS			DNF	
–	Jannis Wolff	Germany	897	886	654	636	0	DNS					DNF	
–	Hadyn Bieling	United States	589	508	499	661	DNS						DNF	
–	Colby Eddowes	Australia	814	886	548	DNS							DNF	
–	Wang Chen-yu	Chinese Taipei	637	0	618	DNS							DNF	
–	Jonas Bjerremand	Denmark	0	0	729	DNS							DNF	
–	Henrique Motta	Brazil	863	679	545	DNS							DNF	
–	Wang Zhipeng	China	874	828	DNS								DNF	
