= Philippines at the 2021 Summer World University Games =

- Flag of the Philippines
- IOC code: PHI

in Chengdu, China 28 July 2023 – 8 August 2023
- Competitors: 31 (16 men and 15 women)
- Medals: Gold 0 Silver 0 Bronze 0 Total 0

Summer World University Games appearances (overview)
- 1965; 1967; 1970–1985; 1987; 1989; 1991; 1993; 1995; 1997; 1999; 2001; 2003; 2005; 2007; 2009; 2011; 2013; 2015; 2017; 2019; 2021; 2025; 2027

Philippines competed at the 2021 Summer World University Games in Chengdu, China held from 28 July to 8 August 2023.

Kelme was the official outfitter of the delegation.

== Competitors ==
Sport	Men	Women	Total
Archery	1	0	1
Athletics	5	5	10
Badminton	5	3	8
Table tennis	1	4	5
Tennis	1	2	3
Wushu	3	1	4
Total	16	15	31

== Archery ==
Player	Event	Ranking round		First round	Second round	Third round	Quarter-finals	Semi-finals	Final / BM	
Player	Event	Score	Rank	Opponent score	Opponent score	Opponent score	Opponent score	Opponent score	Opponent score	Rank
Helbert Climaco	Men's individual recurve	549	57	Majerik (SVK); W 7–1	Bilisari (ITA); L 0–6	Did not advance				

== Athletics ==
Men
Track

Athlete	Event	Heat		Semi-finals		Final	
Athlete	Event	Result	Rank	Result	Rank	Result	Rank
Louie Agawa	1500 metres	4:29.88	28	—N/a		Did not advance	
Jake Calucag	400 metres hurdles	Did not finish				Did not advance	
Rocky Ramos	100 metres	11.14	51	Did not advance			

Field

Athlete	Event	Qualification		Final	
Athlete	Event	Result	Rank	Result	Rank
Renchard Pagulayan	Long jump	Did not start			

Combined events

Athlete	Event		100 m	LJ	SP	HJ	400 m	110H	DT	PV	JT	1500 m	Final	Rank
Jose Matteo Crisostomo	Decathlon	Result	12.20	5.65	11.04	1.63	56.46	17.72	31.80	3.60	40.12	5:25.60	5126 SB	11
Jose Matteo Crisostomo	Decathlon	Points	612	512	548	488	541	551	500	509	444	421	5126 SB	11

Women
Track

Athlete	Event	Heat		Semi-finals		Final	
Athlete	Event	Result	Rank	Result	Rank	Result	Rank
Josefina Baloloy	400 metres hurdles	Did not start					
Alana Halagueña	20 kilometres walk	—N/a				2:13:44	23
Lyka Janer	200 metres	Did not start					
Lyka Janer	400 metres	1:07.16	26	Did not advance			
Juliana Talaro	20 kilometres walk	—N/a				2:06:54	22

Field

Athlete	Event	Qualification		Final	
Athlete	Event	Result	Rank	Result	Rank
Shiloh Corrales Nelson	Shot put	13.61	12 q	14.42	12
Shiloh Corrales Nelson	Hammer throw	52.59	14	Did not advance	

== Badminton ==
Men

Athlete	Event	Round of 64	Round of 32	Round of 16	Quarterfinal	Semifinal	Final / BM	
Athlete	Event	Opposition Score	Opposition Score	Opposition Score	Opposition Score	Opposition Score	Opposition Score	Rank
Ralf Corrales	Singles	Liao (TPE); L 0–2	Did not advance					
Immanuel Maata	Singles	Cimosz (POL); L 0–2	Did not advance					
Tristan Oliveros	Singles	Cheong (MAS); L 0–2	Did not advance					
Thomas Gatdula; Kenji Tashiro	Doubles	Bye	Shuta / Kumagai (JPN); L 0–2	Did not advance				

Women

Athlete	Event	Round of 64	Round of 32	Round of 16	Quarterfinal	Semifinal	Final / BM	
Athlete	Event	Opposition Score	Opposition Score	Opposition Score	Opposition Score	Opposition Score	Opposition Score	Rank
Leonylene Legaspi	Singles	Vieira (BRA); L 0–2	Did not advance					
Michaella Lauson; Alren Joi Mercado	Doubles	Ah / Bahng (KOR); L 0–2	Did not advance					

Mixed

Athlete	Event	Round of 64	Round of 32	Round of 16	Quarterfinal	Semifinal	Final / BM	
Athlete	Event	Opposition Score	Opposition Score	Opposition Score	Opposition Score	Opposition Score	Opposition Score	Rank
Michaella Lauson; Ralf Corrales	Doubles	Güzel / İnci (TUR); L 0–2	Did not advance					

== Table tennis ==
Singles

Athlete	Event	Group round				Round of 64	Round of 32	Round of 16	Quarterfinal	Semifinal	Final / BM	
Athlete	Event	Opposition Result	Opposition Result	Opposition Result	Rank	Opposition Result	Opposition Result	Opposition Result	Opposition Result	Opposition Result	Opposition Result	Rank
Ken Andrei Memoria	Men's singles	Pelz (GER); L 0–3	Li (USA); L 0–3	Artukmetov (KAZ); L 0–3	4	Did not advance						
Gremarie Amata	Women's singles	Oh (KOR); L 0–3	Wang (USA); L 0–3	Batbayar (MGL); L 0–3	4	Did not advance						
Reshma Bagongon	Women's singles	Fukase (BRA); L 2–3	Basak (IND); L 1–3	Aghamohammadi (IRI); L 0–3	4	Did not advance						
Liezl Canada	Women's singles	Stolarski (BRA); W 3–2	Plăian (ROU); L 0–3	—N/a	2	Sung (USA); L 0–4	Did not advance					
Maricris Remo	Women's singles	Hajok (GER); L 0–3	Zhang (SGP); L 0–3	—N/a	3	Did not advance						

Doubles

Athlete	Event	Round of 64	Round of 32	Round of 16	Quarterfinal	Semifinal	Final / BM	
Athlete	Event	Opposition Result	Opposition Result	Opposition Result	Opposition Result	Opposition Result	Opposition Result	Rank
Gremarie Amata; Reshma Bagongon	Women's doubles	Fernando / Rodrigo (SRI); W 3–2	Plăian / Singeorzan (ROU); L 0–3	Did not advance				
Liezl Canada; Maricris Remo	Women's doubles	Men / van Boheemen (NED); L 0–3	Did not advance					
Ken Andrei Memoria; Reshma Bagongon	Mixed doubles	Bye	Do Rosario / Basak (IND); L 0–3	Did not advance				

== Tennis ==
Athlete	Event	Round of 64	Round of 32	Round of 16	Quarter-finals	Semi-finals	Final	
Athlete	Event	Opponent score	Opponent score	Opponent score	Opponent score	Opponent score	Opponent score	Rank
Vincent Tenorio	Men's singles	Sklenka (CZE); L 0–2	Did not advance					
Florence Rose Bayogo	Women's singles	Sazambile (ZAM); L 0–2	Did not advance					
Jeanne Barcia	Women's singles	Aussert (FRA); L 0–2	Did not advance					
Vincent Tenorio; Jeanne Barcia	Mixed doubles	—N/a	G M Ortenzi / B Ortenzi (ITA); L 0–2	Did not advance				

== Wushu ==
Men
Taolu

Athlete	Event	Result	Rank
Jose delos Trinos	Men's changquan	9.086	13
Jose delos Trinos	Men's daoshu	9.166	10
Raymund Pablo	Men's taijijian	9.026	9
Raymund Pablo	Men's taijiquan	9.253	9

Kyorugi

Athlete	Event	Round of 16	Quarter-finals	Semi-finals	Final	
Athlete	Event	Opponent score	Opponent score	Opponent score	Opponent score	Rank
Jet Dela Vega	Men's 60 kg	Bye	Panahigelehkolaei (IRI); L WPD	Did not advance		

Women
Taolu

Athlete	Event	Result	Rank
Ghiel Rhaisa Figueras	Women's nandao	Did not finish	
Ghiel Rhaisa Figueras	Women's nanquan	Did not start	
