= Athletics at the 2021 Summer World University Games – Women's 400 metres =

The women's 400 metres event at the 2021 Summer World University Games was held on 1, 2 and 3 August 2023 at the Shuangliu Sports Centre Stadium in Chengdu, China.

== Medalists ==
Gold	Silver	Bronze
Marlie Viljoen; South Africa	Corrssia Perry; United States	Barbora Malíková; Czech Republic

== Results ==
=== Round 1 ===
Qualification: First 3 in each heat (Q) and the next 4 fastest (q) advance to semifinal.

Rank	Heat	Name	Nationality	Time	Notes
1	2	Corrssia Perry	United States	53.53	Q
2	4	Marlie Viljoen	South Africa	53.53	Q
3	2	Angelique Strydom	South Africa	53.76	Q
4	4	Aleksandra Formella	Poland	53.89	Q
5	1	Letícia Lima	Brazil	54.90	Q
6	1	Barbora Malíková	Czech Republic	55.01	Q
7	3	Karolina Łozowska	Poland	55.08	Q
8	4	Anny de Bassi	Brazil	55.11	Q
9	4	Ajda Kaučič	Slovenia	55.15	q
10	3	Anna Lange	Denmark	55.31	Q
11	3	Noémie Salamin	Switzerland	55.34	Q
12	1	Farida Solieva	Uzbekistan	55.47	Q
13	2	Lamiya Valiyeva	Azerbaijan	55.48	Q
14	4	Yang Hongfei	China	55.65	q
15	2	Golekanye Chikani	Botswana	55.79	q
16	4	Laura van der Veen	Norway	55.93	q
17	3	Motlatsi Rante	Botswana	56.07	
18	3	Douaa Ferdi	Algeria	56.50	
19	2	Rashdeep Kaur	India	56.52	
20	1	Jiang Yiran	China	56.84	
21	3	Fatoumata Baldé	Senegal	57.02	
22	4	Chelsea Bopulas	Malaysia	57.05	
23	1	Gayane Chiloyan	Armenia	57.08	SB
24	1	Rose Draru	Uganda	1:01.17	
25	4	Dorothy Abeja	Uganda	1:01.82	
26	2	Lyka Janer	Philippines	1:07.16	
27	3	Soudi-Thasmy Moussa	Comoros	1:10.16	
–	1	Djamila Zine	Algeria	DQ	TR17.4.3
–	1	Neha Neha	India	DQ	TR17.4.3
–	2	Lamia Al-Masfry	Oman	DQ	CR18.5
–	2	Blessing Akintoye	Nigeria	DNS	

=== Semifinal ===
Qualification: First 3 in each heat (Q) and the next 2 fastest (q) advance to final.

Rank	Heat	Name	Nationality	Time	Notes
1	1	Marlie Viljoen	South Africa	52.98	Q
2	1	Barbora Malíková	Czech Republic	53.05	Q
3	2	Corrssia Perry	United States	53.23	Q
4	1	Aleksandra Formella	Poland	53.24	Q
5	2	Karolina Łozowska	Poland	53.26	Q, PB
6	2	Anny de Bassi	Brazil	53.29	Q
7	2	Angelique Strydom	South Africa	53.38	q
8	1	Letícia Lima	Brazil	53.97	q
9	1	Farida Solieva	Uzbekistan	53.98	
10	1	Noémie Salamin	Switzerland	54.38	
11	2	Ajda Kaučič	Slovenia	54.45	
12	2	Anna Lange	Denmark	54.81	
13	2	Lamiya Valiyeva	Azerbaijan	54.83	NR
14	1	Yang Hongfei	China	54.85	PB
15	1	Golekanye Chikani	Botswana	54.86	
16	2	Laura van der Veen	Norway	55.79	

=== Final ===
Rank	Name	Nationality	Time	Notes
1st place, gold medalist(s)	Marlie Viljoen	South Africa	52.38	
2nd place, silver medalist(s)	Corrssia Perry	United States	52.62	PB
3rd place, bronze medalist(s)	Barbora Malíková	Czech Republic	52.66	
4	Aleksandra Formella	Poland	53.01	
5	Letícia Lima	Brazil	53.04	PB
6	Anny de Bassi	Brazil	53.15	PB
7	Karolina Łozowska	Poland	53.18	PB
8	Angelique Strydom	South Africa	53.78	
