= Oman at the 2021 Summer World University Games =

- Flag of Oman
- IOC code: OMA

in Chengdu, China 28 July 2023 – 8 August 2023
- Competitors: 25 (20 men and 5 women)
- Medals: Gold 0 Silver 0 Bronze 0 Total 0

Summer World University Games appearances
- 1959; 1961; 1963; 1965; 1967; 1970; 1973; 1975; 1977; 1979; 1981; 1983; 1985; 1987; 1989; 1991; 1993; 1995; 1997; 1999; 2001; 2003; 2005; 2007; 2009; 2011; 2013; 2015; 2017; 2019; 2021; 2025; 2027

Oman competed at the 2021 Summer World University Games in Chengdu, China held from 28 July to 8 August 2023.

== Competitors ==
Sport	Men	Women	Total
Athletics	9	4	13
Swimming	4	0	4
Table tennis	4	0	4
Taekwondo	3	1	4
Total	20	5	25

== Athletics ==
Men
Track

Athlete	Event	Heat		Semi-finals		Final	
Athlete	Event	Result	Rank	Result	Rank	Result	Rank
Imad Al-Farsi	Half marathon	—N/a				Did not finish	
Salim Al-Jadeedi	100 metres	Disqualified		Did not advance			
Salim Al-Jadeedi	200 metres	22.58	49	Did not advance			
Abdul Al-Kharusi	1500 metres	Did not finish		—N/a		Did not advance	
Y. Al-Malki	400 metres	52.22	38	Did not advance			
Mansoor Al-Saadi	100 metres	11.39	54	Did not advance			
Khalid Al-Siyabi	800 metres	Disqualified		Did not advance			
Mohammed Al-Suleimani	800 metres	1:52.86	28	Did not advance			

Field

Athlete	Event	Qualification		Final	
Athlete	Event	Result	Rank	Result	Rank
Fatak Bait Jaboob	High jump	2.10	15	Did not advance	
Mubeen Al-Kindi	Hammer throw	56.13	20	Did not advance	

Women
Track

Athlete	Event	Heat		Semi-finals		Final	
Athlete	Event	Result	Rank	Result	Rank	Result	Rank
Hajer Al-Habsi	200 metres	26.95	46	Did not advance			
Lamia Al-Masfry	400 metres	Disqualified		Did not advance			
Azza Al-Yaarubi	100 metres	13.11	45	Did not advance			

Field

Athlete	Event	Qualification		Final	
Athlete	Event	Result	Rank	Result	Rank
Aliya Al-Mughairi	High jump	NM		Did not advance	
Aliya Al-Mughairi	Long jump	Did not start			

== Swimming ==
Men

Athlete	Event	Heat		Semi-finals		Final	
Athlete	Event	Time	Rank	Time	Rank	Time	Rank
Nadhim Al-Harrasi	50 metre butterfly	29.62	48	Did not advance			
Nadhim Al-Harrasi	100 metre butterfly	Did not start					
Mohamed Al-Jabri	100 metre freestyle	1:06.87	54	Did not advance			
Mohamed Al-Jabri	50 metre butterfly	32.18	49	Did not advance			
Khalid Al-Jahdhami	50 metre freestyle	Did not start					
Khalid Al-Jahdhami	50 metre breaststroke	Did not start					
Sultan Al-Kindi	50 metre breaststroke	34.19	45	Did not advance			
Sultan Al-Kindi	100 metre breaststroke	1:18.42	43	Did not advance			

== Table tennis ==
Singles

Athlete	Event	Group round				Round of 64	Round of 32	Round of 16	Quarterfinal	Semifinal	Final / BM	
Athlete	Event	Opposition Result	Opposition Result	Opposition Result	Rank	Opposition Result	Opposition Result	Opposition Result	Opposition Result	Opposition Result	Opposition Result	Rank
Muhannad Al-Balushi	Men's singles	Nuchchart (THA); L 0–3	Mladinz (ROU); L 0–3	Ojha (NEP); W 3–0	3	Did not advance						
Haitham Al-Mandhari	Men's singles	Tosuni (ALB); W 3–1	Yılmaz (TUR); L 0–3	—N/a	2 Q	Pelz (GER); L 1–4	Did not advance					
Mashal Al-Shahi	Men's singles	Yun (KOR); L 0–3	Yokotani (JPN); L 0–3	aynil Mehta (IND); L 0–3	4	Did not advance						
Moath Al-Shahi	Men's singles	Joshi (NEP); L 0–3	Feng (USA); L 0–3	Cheung (HKG); L 0–3	4	Did not advance						
Muhannad Al-Balushi; Mashal Al-Shahi	Men's doubles	—N/a				Ranchagoda / Warusawithana (SRI); L 0–3	Did not advance					
Haitham Al-Mandhari; Moath Al-Shahi	Men's doubles	—N/a				Huzsvar / Mihalovity (HUN); L 0–3	Did not advance					
Muhannad Al-Balushi; Haitham Al-Mandhari; Mashal Al-Shahi; Moath Al-Shahi	Men's team	India (IND); L 0–3	Japan (JPN); L 0–3	—N/a	3	Did not advance						

== Taekwondo ==
Kyorugi

Athlete	Event	Round of 32	Round of 16	Quarter-finals	Semi-finals	Final	
Athlete	Event	Opponent score	Opponent score	Opponent score	Opponent score	Opponent score	Rank
Salim Al-Abri	Men's 68 kg	Enkhbold (MGL); L 0–2	Did not advance				
Nasser Al-Harthy	Men's 54 kg	Mahamad (THA); L 0–2	Did not advance				
Mohammed Al-Aisri	Men's 63 kg	—N/a	Peh (SGP); W 2–0	Reçber (TUR); L 0–2	Did not advance		
Umaima Al-Hinai	Women's 46 kg	—N/a	Lee (KOR); L 0–2	Did not advance			
