= Qatar at the 2021 Summer World University Games =

- Flag of Qatar
- IOC code: QAT

in Chengdu, China 28 July 2023 – 8 August 2023
- Competitors: 6 (5 men and 1 woman)
- Medals: Gold 0 Silver 0 Bronze 0 Total 0

Summer World University Games appearances
- 1959; 1961; 1963; 1965; 1967; 1970; 1973; 1975; 1977; 1979; 1981; 1983; 1985; 1987; 1989; 1991; 1993; 1995; 1997; 1999; 2001; 2003; 2005; 2007; 2009; 2011; 2013; 2015; 2017; 2019; 2021; 2025; 2027

Qatar competed at the 2021 Summer World University Games in Chengdu, China held from 28 July to 8 August 2023.

== Competitors ==
Sport	Men	Women	Total
Athletics	2	0	2
Table tennis	1	0	1
Taekwondo	2	1	3
Total	5	1	6

== Athletics ==
Men
Track

Athlete	Event	Heat		Semi-finals		Final	
Athlete	Event	Result	Rank	Result	Rank	Result	Rank
El Hafez Mahadi	800 metres	1:52.73	27	Did not advance			

Field

Athlete	Event	Qualification		Final	
Athlete	Event	Result	Rank	Result	Rank
Hamdi Ali	High jump	2.10	15	Did not advance	

== Table tennis ==
Athlete	Event	Group round				Round of 64	Round of 32	Round of 16	Quarterfinal	Semifinal	Final / BM	
Athlete	Event	Opposition Result	Opposition Result	Opposition Result	Rank	Opposition Result	Opposition Result	Opposition Result	Opposition Result	Opposition Result	Opposition Result	Rank
Ahmed Saadawi	Men's singles	Mihalovity (HUN); L 0–3	Oráč (SVK); L 0–3	Meringdal (NOR); L 0–3	4	Did not advance						

== Taekwondo ==
Kyorugi

Athlete	Event	Round of 32	Round of 16	Quarter-finals	Semi-finals	Final	
Athlete	Event	Opponent score	Opponent score	Opponent score	Opponent score	Opponent score	Rank
Wadhah Alahmed	Men's +87 kg	—	Jung (TPE); L 0–2	Did not advance			
Mohammad Shalan	Men's 68 kg	Xiao (CHN); L WDR	Did not advance				
Maram Fatnassi	Women's 67 kg	Kadi (ALG); W 2–1	Haddad (FRA); L 0–2	Did not advance			
