= Sri Lanka at the 2021 Summer World University Games =

- Flag of Sri Lanka
- IOC code: SRI

in Chengdu, China 28 July 2023 – 8 August 2023
- Competitors: 17 (9 men and 8 women)
- Medals: Gold 0 Silver 0 Bronze 0 Total 0

Summer World University Games appearances
- 1959; 1961; 1963; 1965; 1967; 1970; 1973; 1975; 1977; 1979; 1981; 1983; 1985; 1987; 1989; 1991; 1993; 1995; 1997; 1999; 2001; 2003; 2005; 2007; 2009; 2011; 2013; 2015; 2017; 2019; 2021; 2025; 2027

Sri Lanka competed at the 2021 Summer World University Games in Chengdu, China held from 28 July to 8 August 2023.

== Competitors ==
Sport	Men	Women	Total
Artistic gymnastics	0	1	1
Athletics	3	3	6
Badminton	0	2	2
Swimming	3	0	3
Table tennis	3	2	5
Total	9	8	17

== Artistic gymnastics ==
Women

Athlete	Event	Qualification						Final					
Athlete	Event	Apparatus				Total	Rank	Apparatus				Total	Rank
Athlete	Event	V	UB	F	BB	Total	Rank	V	UB	F	BB	Total	Rank
Amaya Kalukottage	All-around	11.166	7.666	9.900	9.266	37.998	36	Did not advance					

== Athletics ==
Men
Track

Athlete	Event	Heat		Semi-finals		Final	
Athlete	Event	Result	Rank	Result	Rank	Result	Rank
Roshan Ranatunga	110 metres hurdles	14.08	16	—		Did not advance	

Field

Athlete	Event	Qualification		Final	
Athlete	Event	Result	Rank	Result	Rank
Kumarasiri Chamal	Triple jump	15.30	17	Did not advance	
Tharindu Samaraweera	High jump	2.10	19	Did not advance	

Women
Track

Athlete	Event	Heat		Semi-finals		Final	
Athlete	Event	Result	Rank	Result	Rank	Result	Rank
Amasha De Silva	100 metres	11.89	19 q	Did not start		Did not advance	
Amasha De Silva	200 metres	Did not start					

Field

Athlete	Event	Qualification		Final	
Athlete	Event	Result	Rank	Result	Rank
Weranga Loku Pattiyage	Hammer throw	41.10 SB	16	Did not advance	
Ridma Nishadi Abeyrathna	Long jump	5.77	21	Did not advance	

== Badminton ==
Athlete	Event	Round of 64	Round of 32	Round of 16	Quarterfinal	Semifinal	Final / BM	
Athlete	Event	Opposition Score	Opposition Score	Opposition Score	Opposition Score	Opposition Score	Opposition Score	Rank
Hasini Ambalangodage	Women's singles	Bye	Chua (USA); L 0–2	Did not advance				
Hasara Wijayarathne	Women's singles	Wu (SGP); W 2–0	Kurihara (JPN); L 0–2	Did not advance				
Hasini Ambalangodage; Hasara Wijayarathne	Women's doubles	Bye	Erçetin / İnci (TUR); L 0–2	Did not advance				

== Swimming ==
Men

Athlete	Event	Heat		Semi-finals		Final	
Athlete	Event	Time	Rank	Time	Rank	Time	Rank
Ishara Abeyrathne	100 metre backstroke	1:09.19	37	Did not advance			
Ishara Abeyrathne	100 metre butterfly	1:03.16	41	Did not advance			
Chathusha Dalpathadu	50 metre breaststroke	32.05	43	Did not advance			
Chathusha Dalpathadu	100 metre breaststroke	1:11.58	41	Did not advance			
Sadev Senaratna	50 metre freestyle	Did not start					
Sadev Senaratna	100 metre freestyle	54.42	48	Did not advance			
Sadev Senaratna	50 metre butterfly	25.84	36	Did not advance			

== Table tennis ==
Singles

Athlete	Event	Group round				Round of 64	Round of 32	Round of 16	Quarterfinal	Semifinal	Final / BM	
Athlete	Event	Opposition Result	Opposition Result	Opposition Result	Rank	Opposition Result	Opposition Result	Opposition Result	Opposition Result	Opposition Result	Opposition Result	Rank
Nuwantha Kahawaththa	Men's singles	Mammadov (AZE); W 3–2	Kang (KOR); L 0–3	Jargalsaikhan (MGL); W 3–2	2	Xu (CHN); L 0–4	Did not advance					
Nimesh Ranchagoda	Men's singles	Lotfollah Nasabi (IRI); L 1–3	Rodrigues (BRA); L 0–3	Nemaciuc (ROU); L 0–3	4	Did not advance						
Hiruna Warusawithana	Men's singles	Doubek (SVK); W 3–2	Toma (ROU); L 0–3	Tsissios (CYP); W 3–0	2	Koh (SGP); L 0–4	Did not advance					
Hathadura Fernando	Women's singles	Maruthapandian (USA); L 0–3	van Boheemen (NED); L 2–3	Zakrzewska (POL); L 0–3	4	Did not advance						
Thanushi Rodrigo	Women's singles	Uvgunburged (MGL); L 1–3	Sung (USA); L 9–3	—	3	Did not advance						

Doubles

Athlete	Event	Round of 64	Round of 32	Round of 16	Quarterfinal	Semifinal	Final / BM	
Athlete	Event	Opposition Result	Opposition Result	Opposition Result	Opposition Result	Opposition Result	Opposition Result	Rank
Nimesh Ranchagoda; Hiruna Warusawithana	Men's doubles	Al-Balushi / Al-Shahi (OMA); W 3–0	Gündüz / Yiğenler (TUR); L 0–3	Did not advance				
Hathadura Fernando; Thanushi Rodrigo	Women's doubles	Amata / Bagongon (PHI); L 2–3	Did not advance					
Thanushi Rodrigo; Nuwantha Kahawaththa	Mixed doubles	Mammadov / Abilzade (AZE); L 0–3	Did not advance					
Hathadura Fernando; Nimesh Ranchagoda	Mixed doubles	Pinheiro / Fukase (BRA); L 0–3	Did not advance					
