= Athletics at the 2021 Summer World University Games – Women's 400 metres hurdles =

The women's 400 metres hurdles event at the 2021 Summer World University Games was held on 1, 2 and 3 August 2023 at the Shuangliu Sports Centre Stadium in Chengdu, China.

== Medalists ==
Gold	Silver	Bronze
Alice Muraro; Italy	Marlene Santos; Brazil	Sára Mátó; Hungary

== Results ==
=== Round 1 ===
Qualification: First 3 in each heat (Q) and the next 4 fastest (q) advance to semifinal.

Rank	Heat	Name	Nationality	Time	Notes
1	1	Alice Muraro	Italy	56.97	Q
2	4	Karin Disch	Switzerland	57.52	Q
3	2	Marlene Santos	Brazil	57.61	Q
4	4	Gezelle Magerman	South Africa	57.66	Q
5	2	Oksana Aeschbacher	Switzerland	57.69	Q
6	2	Ami Yamamoto	Japan	57.82	Q
7	2	Sára Mátó	Hungary	57.83	q
8	1	Adelina Zems	Kazakhstan	58.19	Q
9	3	Natalia Wosztyl	Poland	58.44	Q
10	3	Fu Yijia	China	58.65	Q
11	3	Martha Rasmussen	Denmark	59.23	Q
12	4	Wang Hongyan	China	59.51	Q
13	1	Daniela Ledecká	Slovakia	1:00.38	Q
14	1	Dhivya Jayaram	India	1:00.51	q
15	1	Lin Yu-chieh	Chinese Taipei	1:00.88	q
16	4	Laura Dobránszky	Hungary	1:01.32	q
17	1	Ashleigh Ma Ying Wen	Hong Kong	1:01.77	SB
18	3	Nidhi Singh	India	1:02.63	
19	2	Mandy Goh Li	Malaysia	1:02.66	
20	1	Izabela Eržen	Slovenia	1:02.74	
21	4	Chaima Ouanis	Algeria	1:04.75	
22	3	Candela Belaustegui	Argentina	1:04.84	
–	4	Izabela Smolińska	Poland	DNF	
–	3	Rogail Joseph	South Africa	DQ	TR22.6.1
–	2	Josefina Baloloy	Philippines	DNS	
–	3	Fatoumata Baldé	Senegal	DNS	

=== Semifinal ===
Qualification: First 3 in each heat (Q) and the next 2 fastest (q) advance to final.

Rank	Heat	Name	Nationality	Time	Notes
1	1	Alice Muraro	Italy	56.54	Q
2	1	Marlene Santos	Brazil	56.97	Q, SB
3	1	Sára Mátó	Hungary	57.39	Q
4	2	Karin Disch	Switzerland	57.54	Q
5	2	Daniela Ledecká	Slovakia	57.54	Q
6	2	Gezelle Magerman	South Africa	57.55	Q
7	2	Ami Yamamoto	Japan	57.56	q
8	1	Oksana Aeschbacher	Switzerland	57.93	q
9	2	Natalia Wosztyl	Poland	58.02	
10	1	Adelina Zems	Kazakhstan	58.08	
11	2	Fu Yijia	China	58.98	
12	1	Wang Hongyan	China	59.07	SB
13	1	Martha Rasmussen	Denmark	59.08	
14	2	Laura Dobránszky	Hungary	1:00.54	
15	2	Dhivya Jayaram	India	1:01.24	
16	1	Lin Yu-chieh	Chinese Taipei	1:02.71	

=== Final ===
Rank	Name	Nationality	Time	Notes
1st place, gold medalist(s)	Alice Muraro	Italy	55.48	PB
2nd place, silver medalist(s)	Marlene Santos	Brazil	56.45	PB
3rd place, bronze medalist(s)	Sára Mátó	Hungary	56.58	PB
4	Daniela Ledecká	Slovakia	56.71	SB
5	Ami Yamamoto	Japan	57.19	
6	Gezelle Magerman	South Africa	57.38	
7	Karin Disch	Switzerland	57.51	PB
8	Oksana Aeschbacher	Switzerland	58.35	
