= Ken Toyoda =

Japanese athlete

Personal information
- Born: 15 October 2002 (age 24)

Sport
- Country: Japan
- Sport: Athletics
- Event: 110 metres hurdles

Achievements and titles
- Personal best: 110 m hurdles: 13.29 (2023)
Medal record
Summer World University Games
Gold medal – first place	2021 Chengdu	110 m hurdles

Ken Toyoda (Japanese: 豊田兼; born 15 October 2002) is a Japanese track and field athlete.

His father is French and mother is Japanese. He is studying in Keio University. He won a gold medal in the 110 metres hurdles at the 2021 Summer World University Games.
