= Denmark at the 2021 Summer World University Games =

- Flag of Denmark
- IOC code: DEN

in Chengdu, China 28 July 2023 – 8 August 2023
- Competitors: 13 (1 man and 12 women)
- Medals: Gold 0 Silver 0 Bronze 0 Total 0

Summer World University Games appearances
- 1959; 1961; 1963; 1965; 1967; 1970; 1973; 1975; 1977; 1979; 1981; 1983; 1985; 1987; 1989; 1991; 1993; 1995; 1997; 1999; 2001; 2003; 2005; 2007; 2009; 2011; 2013; 2015; 2017; 2019; 2021; 2025; 2027

Denmark competed at the 2021 Summer World University Games in Chengdu, China held from 28 July to 8 August 2023.

== Competitors ==
Sport	Men	Women	Total
Athletics	1	8	9
Fencing	0	1	1
Shooting	0	2	2
Swimming	0	1	1
Total	1	12	13

== Athletics ==
Men

Athlete	Event		100 m	LJ	SP	HJ	400 m	110H	DT	PV	JT	1500 m	Final	Rank
Jonas Bjerremand	Decathlon	Result	18.74	NM	14.01	NM	DNS	—						Did not finish
Jonas Bjerremand	Decathlon	Points	0	0	729	0	—	—						Did not finish

Women

Track

Athlete	Event	Heat		Semi-finals		Final	
Athlete	Event	Result	Rank	Result	Rank	Result	Rank
Anna Øbakke Lange	400 metres	55.31	10 Q	54.81	12	Did not advance	
Martha Rasmussen	400 metres hurdles	59.23	11 Q	59.08	13	Did not advance	
Line Kalstrup Schulz	1500 metres	4:36.43	20	—		Did not advance	
Line Kalstrup Schulz	5000 metres	17:11.67	11 Q	—		17:37.24	14
Camilla Høgh Sørensen	100 metres	12.27	36	Did not advance			

Field

Athlete	Event	Qualification		Final	
Athlete	Event	Result	Rank	Result	Rank
Katrine Fjerbæk Olsen	High jump	1.70	20	Did not advance	
Annette Nielsen	Long jump	5.70	22	Did not advance	
Laura Tølløse	Long jump	5.70	23	Did not advance	

Combined events

Athlete	Event		100H	HJ	SP	200 m	LJ	JT	800 m	Final	Rank
Nikoline Lybæk Petersen	Heptathlon	Result	14.38 PB	1.62	11.02	26.31	5.43 =SB	34.89	2:45.81	4808	19
Nikoline Lybæk Petersen	Heptathlon	Points	925	759	596	770	680	570	508	4808	19

== Fencing ==
Athlete	Event	Group stage							Round of 128	Round of 64	Round of 32	Round of 16	Quarter-finals	Semi-finals	Final / BM	
Athlete	Event	Opponent score	Opponent score	Opponent score	Opponent score	Opponent score	Opponent score	Rank	Opponent score	Opponent score	Opponent score	Opponent score	Opponent score	Opponent score	Opponent score	Rank
Line Baun Grubak	Women's individual épée	Vuorinen (FIN); L 4–5	Zolzaya (MGL); W 5–1	Tang (CHN); L 2–5	Ažukaitė (LTU); L 4–5	Terayama (JPN); L 1–5	—	60	Did not advance							

== Shooting ==
Women

Athlete	Event	Qualification		Final	
Athlete	Event	Points	Rank	Points	Rank
Kristine Rødsgaard Christensen	10 metres air rifle	603.2	54	Did not advance	
Kristine Rødsgaard Christensen	50 metres rifle three positions	1132	46	Did not advance	
Josephine Østergaard Larsen	10 metres air rifle	626.2	22	Did not advance	
Josephine Østergaard Larsen	50 metres rifle three positions	1167	20	Did not advance	

== Swimming ==
Women

Athlete	Event	Heat		Semi-finals		Final	
Athlete	Event	Time	Rank	Time	Rank	Time	Rank
Emilie Beckmann	50 metre butterfly	27.05	13 Q	26.60	7 Q	26.44	4
Emilie Beckmann	100 metre butterfly	1:00.44	14 Q	1:00.35	14	Did not advance	
