= Zhang Jingqiang =

Chinese track and field athlete

Personal information
- Born: 8 May 1996 (age 30) Heilongjiang, China

Sport
- Country: China
- Sport: Athletics
- Event: Long jump

Achievements and titles
- Personal best: Long jump: 8.28 (2022)
Medal record
Summer World University Games
Gold medal – first place	2021 Chengdu	Long jump

Zhang Jingqiang (Chinese: 張景強; born 8 May 1996) is a Chinese track and field athlete.

Zhang is a law graduate from Harbin Institute of Technology. He won a gold medal in the long jump at the 2021 Summer World University Games.
