= Archery at the 2015 Summer Universiade =

Archery at the 2015 Summer Universiade was held in International Archery Center, Gwangju, South Korea from July 4 to 8, 2015. Four competitions were held in men and women's recurve and in men and women's compound.

== Medalists ==
=== Recurve ===
| Event | Gold | Silver | Bronze |
|---|---|---|---|
| Men's individual | Lee Seung-yun; South Korea | Ku Bon-chan; South Korea | Kim Woo-jin; South Korea |
| Men's team | South Korea (KOR); Kim Woo-jin; Ku Bon-chan; Lee Seung-yun | Chinese Taipei; Wang Hou-chieh; Wei Chun-heng; Yu Guan-lin | Russia (RUS); Galsan Bazarzhapov; Artem Makhnenko; Bair Tsybekdorzhiev |
| Women's individual | Ki Bo-bae; South Korea | Choi Mi-sun; South Korea | Maja Jager; Denmark |
| Women's team | Chinese Taipei; Hsiung Mei-chien; Lin Shih-chia; Tan Ya-ting | South Korea (KOR); Choi Mi-sun; Kang Chae-young; Ki Bo-bae | Russia (RUS); Anna Balsukova; Tuyana Dashidorzhieva; Inna Stepanova |
| Mixed team | South Korea (KOR); Lee Seung-yun; Ki Bo-bae | Chinese Taipei; Wei Chun-heng; Tan Ya-ting | Russia (RUS); Galsan Bazarzhapov; Inna Stepanova |

=== Compound ===
| Event | Gold | Silver | Bronze |
|---|---|---|---|
| Men's individual | Kim Jong-ho; South Korea | Kim Tae-yoon; South Korea | Renaud Domanski; Belgium |
| Men's team | South Korea (KOR); Kim Jong-ho; Kim Tae-yoon; Yang Young-ho | Mexico (MEX); Mario Cardoso; Daniel del Valle; Adolfo Medina | Italy (ITA); Luca Fanti; Andrea Leotta; Jacopo Polidori |
| Women's individual | Song Yun-soo; South Korea | Toja Cerne; Slovenia | Stephanie Salinas; Mexico |
| Women's team | Russia (RUS); Natalia Avdeeva; Svetlana Cherkashneva; Maria Vinogradova | United States (USA); Carlissa Cochran; Mackenzie Kieborz; Brogan Williams | South Korea (KOR); Kim Yun-hee; Seol Da-yeong; Song Yun-soo |
| Mixed team | South Korea (KOR); Kim Jong-ho; Song Yun-soo | India (IND); Kawalpreet Singh; Jyothi Surekha Vennam | Belgium (BEL); Renaud Domanski; Sarah Prieels |

== Medal table ==
* Host nation (South Korea)

| Rank | Nation | Gold | Silver | Bronze | Total |
|---|---|---|---|---|---|
| 1 | South Korea* | 8 | 4 | 2 | 14 |
| 2 | Chinese Taipei | 1 | 2 | 0 | 3 |
| 3 | Russia | 1 | 0 | 3 | 4 |
| 4 | Mexico | 0 | 1 | 1 | 2 |
| 5 | India | 0 | 1 | 0 | 1 |
| 5 | Slovenia | 0 | 1 | 0 | 1 |
| 5 | United States | 0 | 1 | 0 | 1 |
| 8 | Belgium | 0 | 0 | 2 | 2 |
| 9 | Denmark | 0 | 0 | 1 | 1 |
| 9 | Italy | 0 | 0 | 1 | 1 |
| Totals (10 entries) | | 10 | 10 | 10 | 30 |
