= Jens Mergenthaler =

German track and field athlete (born 1997)

Personal information
- Born: 13 June 1997 (age 29) Stuttgart

Sport
- Country: Germany
- Sport: Athletics
- Event: 3000 metres steeplechase

Achievements and titles
- Personal best: 3000 m SC: 8:26.35 (2023)
Medal record
Summer World University Games
Gold medal – first place	2021 Chengdu	3000 m steeplechase

Jens Mergenthaler (born 13 June 1997) is a German track and field athlete.

He is studying mechanical engineering at the Esslingen University of Applied Sciences. He won a gold medal in the 3000 metres steeplechase at the 2021 Summer World University Games.
