= Célia Perron =

French athlete (born 1997)

Personal information
- Born: 18 April 1997 (age 29) Ploemeur, France
- Height: 177 cm (5 ft 10 in)
- Weight: 64 kg (141 lb)

Sport
- Country: France
- Sport: Athletics
- Events: Heptathlon, Pentathlon
- Club: ECLA Albi Athlétisme
- Coached by: Gaëtan Blouin

Achievements and titles
- Personal bests: Heptathlon: 6138 (2024); Pentathlon: 4471 (2025)

Célia Perron (born 18 April 1997) is a French multi-event athlete. She has won the French Indoor Athletics Championships in the pentathlon.

== Early life ==
She is from Albi, and started heptathlon at the age of 12 years-old. She studied at the Toulouse III - Paul Sabatier University and later joined the École Nationale Supérieure des Ingénieurs en Arts Chimiques et Technologiques in 2019.

== Career ==
She was the French Under-23 indoor and outdoor champion in 2019 and competed at the 2019 European Athletics U20 Championships in Sweden, placing seventeenth overall.

She won the French Indoor Athletics Championships in the pentathlon in 2021. She finished eighth in the pentathlon at the 2021 European Athletics Indoor Championships.

In January 2024, she set a new personal best tally of 4449 points for the pentathlon competing in Aubière. She won the French Indoor Athletics Championships in the pentathlon in 2025 with a personal best tally of 4471 points. She was selected for the 2025 World Athletics Indoor Championships in Nanjing, China, where she placed seventh overall in the pentathlon with 4433 points.

Perron placed third in the pentathlon at the 2026 French Indoor Athletics Championships in Aubiere, with 4367 points.
