= Isabel Posch =

Austrian athlete (born 2000)

Personal information
- Nationality: Austrian
- Born: 28 February 2000 (age 26)

Sport
- Sport: Athletics
- Event: Heptathlon

Achievements and titles
- Personal bests: Heptathlon : 6107 (Chengdu, 2023); Pentathlon: 4174 (Linz, 2024); 100 m: 11.10 (St. Pölten, 2026) NR
Medal record
Women's athletics
Representing Austria
Summer World University Games
Gold medal – first place	2021 Chengdu	Heptathlon

Isabel Posch (born 28 February 2000) is an Austrian multi-event athlete and sprinter. She has won national indoor titles in the long jump and the pentathlon and in 2026 set a national record in the 100 metres.

== Early life ==
From Vorarlberg, she is member of TS Lustenau in Lustenau.

== Career ==
She became national indoor champion in the pentathlon in Linz in 2023 setting a new Austrian national record points tally, beating the previous record set by Chiara Schuler in 2022. At the same Austrian championships she won the national indoor title in the long jump with a distance of 6.14 metres.

She went past 6000 points in the heptathlon for the first time at the Hypomeeting in Gotzis in May 2023, with her efforts including a 6.43m personal best in the long jump. In June, she was part of the Austrian women's 4 × 100 metres team which set a new national record at the 2023 European Athletics Team Championships.

In August 2023, she won the heptathlon at the delayed 2021 Summer World University Games. Separately, she also reached the final of the women's long jump at the championships.

She retained her national indoors long jump title with a distance of 6.19 meters in Linz in February 2024. She also placed second in the 60 metres final at the championships behind Magdalena Lindner.

She was selected for the 2024 European Athletics Championships in Rome.

On 4 June 2026, at the Liese Prokop Memorial in St. Pölten, Posch broke the Austrian 100 m national record running the time of 11.10 seconds, breaking the Karin Mayr-Krifka mark of 11.15 from 2003. Competing at the Sparkassen Open in Regensburg on 6 June, Posch was part of the Austria women's 4 × 100 m relay team as they set a new national record of 43.11 seconds. In August 2026, she competed at the 2026 European Athletics Championships in Birmingham, England, in the women's 100 metres. She also competed in the women's 4 × 100 metres relay at the championships.
