= Australia at the 2021 Summer World University Games =

- Flag of Australia
- IOC code: AUS

in Chengdu, China 28 July 2023 – 8 August 2023
- Competitors: 95 (45 men and 50 women)
- Medals Ranked 28th: Gold 1 Silver 1 Bronze 4 Total 6

Summer World University Games appearances
- 1967; 1970; 1973; 1975; 1977; 1979; 1981; 1983; 1985; 1987; 1989; 1991; 1993; 1995; 1997; 1999; 2001; 2003; 2005; 2007; 2009; 2011; 2013; 2015; 2017; 2019; 2021; 2025; 2027

Australia competed at the 2021 Summer World University Games in Chengdu, China held from 28 July to 8 August 2023.

== Medal summary ==
=== Medal by sports ===
Rank	Sports	Gold	Silver	Bronze	Total
1	Athletics	1	1	3	5
2	Water polo	0	0	1	1
Totals (2 entries)		1	1	4	6

=== Medalists ===
Medal	Name	Sport	Event	Day
Gold	Cara Feain-Ryan	Athletics	Women's 3000 metres steeplechase	4 August
Silver	Reece Holder	Athletics	Men's 400 metres	3 August
Bronze	Alec Diamond	Athletics	Men's decathlon	3 August
Bronze	Georgia Winkcup	Athletics	Women's 3000 metres steeplechase	4 August
Bronze	William Thompson; Mitchell Baker; Dylan Richardson; Timothy Fraser	Athletics	Men's 20 kilometres walk team	5 August
Bronze	Isobelle Pamp; Mia Glasel; Lucinda Marsh; Camilla MacKay; Emily Fitzgerald; Indigo Ditterick / Eleanor Campbell; Lucinda Gillis; Grace Coleman; Madissyn Powells; Savannah Henshaw; Victoria Ridhalgh	Water polo	Women's tournament	7 August
