= Hungary at the 2021 Summer World University Games =

- Flag of Hungary
- IOC code: HUN

in Chengdu, China 28 July 2023 – 8 August 2023
- Competitors: 113 (59 men and 54 women)
- Medals Ranked 17th: Gold 3 Silver 8 Bronze 6 Total 17

Summer World University Games appearances
- 1959; 1961; 1963; 1965; 1967; 1970; 1973; 1975; 1977; 1979; 1981; 1983; 1985; 1987; 1989; 1991; 1993; 1995; 1997; 1999; 2001; 2003; 2005; 2007; 2009; 2011; 2013; 2015; 2017; 2019; 2021; 2025; 2027

Hungary competed at the 2021 Summer World University Games in Chengdu, China held from 28 July to 8 August 2023.

== Medal summary ==
=== Medal by sports ===
Rank	Sports	Gold	Silver	Bronze	Total
1	Rhythmic gymnastics	2	0	0	2
2	Judo	1	0	1	2
3	Swimming	0	3	1	4
4	Shooting	0	3	0	3
5	Fencing	0	1	1	2
6	Water polo	0	1	0	1
7	Athletics	0	0	2	2
8	Rowing	0	0	1	1
Totals (8 entries)		3	8	6	17

=== Medalists ===
Medal	Name	Sport	Event	Day
Gold	Fanni Pigniczki	Rhythmic gymnastics	Women' individual all-around	30 July
Gold	Fanni Pigniczki	Rhythmic gymnastics	Women's individual ball	31 July
Gold	Roland Gőz	Judo	Men's -90 kg	31 July
Silver	Sára Fábián	Shooting	10 m air pistol women	29 July
Silver	Gitta Bajos; Eszter Dénes; Dorina Lovász	Shooting	10 m air rifle team women	29 July
Silver	Sára Fábián	Shooting	25 m pistol women	1 August
Silver	Gergő Horváth	Fencing	Men's individual sabre	2 August
Silver	Dalma Sebestyén	Swimming	Women's 200 m medley	4 August
Silver	Dalma Sebestyén	Swimming	Women's 200 m butterfly	7 August
Silver	Ajna Késely	Swimming	Women's 400 m freestyle	7 August
Silver	Márton Mizsei; Bendegúz Kevi; Zsombor Szeghalmi; Benedek Baksa; Botond Bóbis; György Ágh; Döme Dala / Máté Aranyi; Balázs Nyíri; Bendegúz Ekler; Péter Sugár; Benedek Batizi; Benedek Danka	Water polo	Men's tournament	8 August
Bronze	Róza Gyertyás	Judo	Women's -52 kg	29 July
Bronze	Eszter Szabó-Feltóthy	Swimming	Women's 200 m backstroke	2 August
Bronze	Sára Mátó	Athletics	Women's 400 metres hurdles	3 August
Bronze	Gergely Török	Athletics	Men's high jump	3 August
Bronze	Jázmin Tóth; Eszter Muhari; Edina Kardos; Tamara Gnám	Fencing	Women's team épée	5 August
Bronze	Bence Szabó; Kálmán Furkó	Rowing	Lightweight men's double sculls	6 August
