= Switzerland at the 2021 Summer World University Games =

- Flag of Switzerland
- IOC code: SUI

in Chengdu, China 28 July 2023 – 8 August 2023
- Competitors: 71 (39 men and 32 women)
- Medals Ranked 23rd: Gold 2 Silver 1 Bronze 4 Total 7

Summer World University Games appearances
- 1959; 1961; 1963; 1965; 1967; 1970; 1973; 1975; 1977; 1979; 1981; 1983; 1985; 1987; 1989; 1991; 1993; 1995; 1997; 1999; 2001; 2003; 2005; 2007; 2009; 2011; 2013; 2015; 2017; 2019; 2021; 2025; 2027

Switzerland competed at the 2021 Summer World University Games in Chengdu, China held from 28 July to 8 August 2023.

== Medal summary ==
=== Medal by sports ===
Rank	Sports	Gold	Silver	Bronze	Total
1	Tennis	1	1	1	3
2	Athletics	1	0	2	3
3	Judo	0	0	1	1
Totals (3 entries)		2	1	4	7

=== Medalists ===
Medal	Name	Sport	Event	Day
Gold	Angelica Moser	Athletics	Women's pole vault	4 August
Gold	Henry von der Schulenburg	Tennis	Men's singles	6 August
Silver	Jonas Schär; Henry von der Schulenburg; Jeffrey von der Schulenburg	Tennis	Men's team	6 August
Bronze	Lydia Boll	Athletics	Women's heptathlon	5 August
Bronze	Jonas Schär; Jeffrey von der Schulenburg	Tennis	Men's doubles	5 August
Bronze	Gioia Vetterli	Judo	Women's 70 kg	30 July
Bronze	Noémie Salamin; Veronica Vancardo; Oksana Aeschbacher; Karin Disch	Athletics	Women's 4 × 400 metres relay	6 August
