= Germany at the 2021 Summer World University Games =

Germany at the 2021 World University Games
- IOC code: GER
- NOC: Allgemeiner Deutscher Hochschulsportverband (ADH)
- Website: www.adh.de

in Chengdu, China 28 July 2024 – 8 August 2024
- Competitors: 160 (93 men and 67 women)
- Medals Ranked 12th: Gold 4 Silver 8 Bronze 12 Total 24

Germany is scheduled to compete at the 2021 Summer World University Games in Chengdu from 28 July to 8 August 2023.

== Medalists ==
Medal	Name	Sport	Event	Date
Gold	Falk Petersilka	Judo	Men's −100 kg	31 July
Gold	Luca Armbruster	Swimming	Men's 50 metre butterfly	2 August
Gold	Jens Mergenthaler	Athletics	Men's 3000 metres steeplechase	3 August
Gold	Antonia Kinzel	Athletics	Women's discus throw	5 August
Silver	Samira Bock	Judo	Women's −70 kg	30 July
Silver	Lou Massenberg; Alexander Lube	Diving	Men's 3 metre synchronized springboard	31 July
Silver	Annika Würfel; Laila Gobel; Agatha Schmidt; Samira Bock; Raffaella Igl	Judo	Women's team	1 August
Silver	Lou Massenberg; Tom Waldsteiner	Diving	Men's 10 metre synchronized platform	3 August
Silver	Nick Jäger	Athletics	Men's 3000 metres steeplechase	3 August
Silver	Sophie Scheder	Artistic gymnastics	Women's uneven bars	5 August
Silver	Leon Schandl; Tom Tewes; Lukas Fobinger; David Keefer; Henning Köncke; Henry Hopmann; Friedrich Dunkel; René Schmela; Till Martini	Rowing	Men's eight	6 August
Silver	Richard Mohr; Finn Wolter	Rowing	Lightweight men's double sculls	6 August
Bronze	Annika Würfel	Judo	Women's −52 kg	29 July
Bronze	Agatha Schmidt	Judo	Women's −63 kg	30 July
Bronze	Raffaella Igl	Judo	Women's −78 kg	31 July
Bronze	Lea Riedel	Athletics	Women's shot put	1 August
Bronze	Supharada Kisskalt	Taekwondo	Women's –49 kg	1 August
Bronze	Florian Bluhm; Tobias Hippler; Kirill Fadeev; Nils Hohmeier; Pekka Pelz	Table tennis	Men's team	1 August
Bronze	Xaver Hastenrath	Athletics	Men's shot put	2 August
Bronze	Marius Zobel	Swimming	Men's 200 metre medley	3 August
Bronze	Alema Hadžić	Taekwondo	Women's -73 kg	3 August
Bronze	Alissa Buhrmann; Paula Rossen	Rowing	Women's pair	6 August
Bronze	Julia Tertünte	Rowing	Lightweight women's single sculls	6 August
Bronze	Janka Kirstein; Elrond Kullmann; Felix Heinrich; Helena Brenke	Rowing	Mixed quadruple sculls	6 August

=== Medal by sports ===
Medals by sport
Athletics	2	1	2	5
Judo	1	2	3	6
Swimming	1	0	1	2
Rowing	0	2	3	5
Diving	0	2	0	2
Artistic gymnastics	0	1	0	1
Taekwondo	0	0	2	2
Table tennis	0	0	1	1
