= Brazil at the 2021 Summer World University Games =

- Flag of Brazil
- IOC code: BRA

in Chengdu, China 28 July 2023 – 8 August 2023
- Competitors: 151 (78 men and 73 women)
- Medals Ranked 37th: Gold 0 Silver 7 Bronze 6 Total 13

Summer World University Games appearances
- 1959; 1961; 1963; 1965; 1967; 1970; 1973; 1975; 1977; 1979; 1981; 1983; 1985; 1987; 1989; 1991; 1993; 1995; 1997; 1999; 2001; 2003; 2005; 2007; 2009; 2011; 2013; 2015; 2017; 2019; 2021; 2025; 2027

Brazil competed at the 2021 Summer World University Games in Chengdu, China held from 28 July to 8 August 2023.

== Medal summary ==
=== Medal by sports ===
Rank	Sports	Gold	Silver	Bronze	Total
1	Swimming	0	3	4	7
2	Athletics	0	2	0	2
3	Basketball	0	1	0	1
3	Diving	0	1	0	1
5	Judo	0	0	2	2
Totals (5 entries)		0	7	6	13

=== Medalists ===
Medal	Name	Sport	Event	Day
Silver	Eduardo Moraes	Swimming	Men's 400 metre freestyle	1 August
Silver	Pedro Spajari; Lucas Peixoto; Breno Correia; Vinícius Assunção	Swimming	Men's 4 x 100 metre freestyle relay	1 August
Silver	Anna Lúcia Santos; Rafael Silva	Diving	Mixed synchronized 3 metre springboard	3 August
Silver	Marlene dos Santos	Athletics	Women's 400 metres hurdles	3 August
Silver	Marlene dos Santos; Letícia Lima; Giovana dos Santos; Anny de Bassi	Athletics	Women's 4 × 400 metres relay	6 August
Silver	Felipe Ruivo; Paulo Junior; Lucas Siewert; Adyel Borges; Jonas Buffat; Caio Pacheco / Rafael Munford; João Pereira; Guilherme Abreu; Daniel Onwenu; Victor da Silva; Dikembe André	Basketball	Men's tournament	6 August
Silver	Lucas Peixoto	Swimming	Men's 4 x 100 metre freestyle relay	1 August
Bronze	Ágatha Silva	Judo	Women's +78 kg	31 July
Bronze	Luana da Costa; Tainná Mota; Thayná Lemos; Maria Guilherme; Shirlen Nascimento; Ágatha Silva; Millena da Silva	Judo	Women's team	1 August
Bronze	Lucas Peixoto	Swimming	Men's 50 metre freestyle	7 August
Bronze	Vinícius Assunção; Breno Correia; Luanna Oliveira; Fernanda Celidonio; Marco Júnior	Swimming	Mixed 4 x 100 metre freestyle relay	5 August
Bronze	Breno Correia; Vinícius Assunção; Eduardo de Moraes; Kaique Alves; Matheus Gonche	Swimming	Men's 4 x 200 metre freestyle relay	6 August
Bronze	Jhennifer Conceição	Swimming	Women's 50 metre breaststroke	7 August
