= Nepal at the 2021 Summer World University Games =

- Flag of Nepal
- IOC code: NEP

in Chengdu, China 28 July 2023 – 8 August 2023
- Competitors: 18 (12 men and 6 women)
- Medals: Gold 0 Silver 0 Bronze 0 Total 0

Summer World University Games appearances
- 1959; 1961; 1963; 1965; 1967; 1970; 1973; 1975; 1977; 1979; 1981; 1983; 1985; 1987; 1989; 1991; 1993; 1995; 1997; 1999; 2001; 2003; 2005; 2007; 2009; 2011; 2013; 2015; 2017; 2019; 2021; 2025; 2027

Nepal competed at the 2021 Summer World University Games in Chengdu, China held from 28 July to 8 August 2023.

== Competitors ==
Sport	Men	Women	Total
Athletics	1	0	1
Badminton	1	0	1
Fencing	2	1	3
Table tennis	3	0	3
Taekwondo	3	3	6
Wushu	2	2	4
Total	12	6	18

== Athletics ==
Men

Athlete	Event	Heat		Semi-finals		Final	
Athlete	Event	Result	Rank	Result	Rank	Result	Rank
Sujan Shrestha	400 metres	Did not start					

== Badminton ==
Athlete	Event	Round of 64	Round of 32	Round of 16	Quarterfinal	Semifinal	Final / BM	
Athlete	Event	Opposition Score	Opposition Score	Opposition Score	Opposition Score	Opposition Score	Opposition Score	Rank
Sulav Lohani	Men's singles	Alič (SLO); L 0–2	Did not advance					

== Fencing ==
Athlete	Event	Group stage							Round of 128	Round of 64	Round of 32	Round of 16	Quarter-finals	Semi-finals	Final / BM	
Athlete	Event	Opponent score	Opponent score	Opponent score	Opponent score	Opponent score	Opponent score	Rank	Opponent score	Opponent score	Opponent score	Opponent score	Opponent score	Opponent score	Opponent score	Rank
Bijay Adhikari	Men's individual épée	Yu (CHN); L 0–5	Yeung (UAE); L 1–3	Erbetta (SUI); L 0–5	Khosbayar (MGL); L 2–4	Duduc (SVK); L 0–5	Mencarelli (ITA); L 3–5	100	Did not advance							
Akchyat Sherchan	Men's individual épée	Ma (USA); L 0–5	Hasanov (AZE); L 1–5	Coufal (CZE); L 1–5	Biro (AUT); L 0–5	Fenyvesi (HUN); L 0–5	Ng (HKG); L 1–5	103	Did not advance							
Pramila Biswakarma	Women's individual épée	Vanryssel (FRA); L 0–5	Gnám (HUN); L 1–5	Conrad (SUI); L 2–5	Marzani (ITA); L 0–5	Liang (USA); L 0–5	Saligerová (CZE); L 2–5	74	Did not advance							

== Table tennis ==
Athlete	Event	Group round				Round of 64	Round of 32	Round of 16	Quarterfinal	Semifinal	Final / BM	
Athlete	Event	Opposition Result	Opposition Result	Opposition Result	Rank	Opposition Result	Opposition Result	Opposition Result	Opposition Result	Opposition Result	Opposition Result	Rank
Ritiz Joshi	Men's singles	Al-Shahi (OMA); W 3–0	Cheung (HKG); L 0–3	Feng (USA); L 0–3	3	Did not advance						
Kushal Nyachhyon	Men's singles	Man (CHN); L 0–3	Yang (TPE); L 0–3	—	3	Did not advance						
Roshan Ojha	Men's singles	Mladin (ROU); L 0–3	Nuchchart (THA); L 0–3	Al-Balushi (OMA); L 0–3	4	Did not advance						
Ritiz Joshi; Kushal Nyachhyon	Men's doubles	—				Kasymov / Nasirdinov (KGZ); W 3–2	Kang / Ryu (KOR); L 0–3	Did not advance				

== Taekwondo ==
Kyorugi

Athlete	Event	Round of 32	Round of 16	Quarter-finals	Semi-finals	Final	
Athlete	Event	Opponent score	Opponent score	Opponent score	Opponent score	Opponent score	Rank
Rohit Maharjan	Men's 68 kg	Kurmanaliev (KGZ); L 0–2	Did not advance				
Sahil Sunar	Men's 63 kg	Torosyan (ARM); L DSQ	Did not advance				
Susma Shrestha	Women's 57 kg	Zhamaubay (KAZ); L 0–2	Did not advance				
Kanchan Thapa	Women's 53 kg	Ahmad (SYR); L 0–2	Did not advance				

Poomsae

Athlete	Event	Preliminary		Semi-finals		Final	
Athlete	Event	Score	Rank	Score	Rank	Score	Rank
Ashmin Raut	Men's individual	6.470	10	Did not advance			
Nisha Darnal	Women's individual	6.270	10	Did not advance			
Nisha Darnal; Ashmin Raut	Mixed pair	6.150	10	Did not advance			

== Wushu ==
Taolu
Men

Athlete	Event	Result	Rank
Bijay Sinjali	Men's changquan	9.530	6
Bijay Sinjali	Men's nangun	Did not start	
Pasang Sherpa	Men's taijijian	8.860	11
Pasang Sherpa	Men's taijiquan	8.720	11

Women

Athlete	Event	Result	Rank
Nima Gharti Magar	Women's nandao	9.393	5
Nima Gharti Magar	Women's nanquan	9.270	6
Junu Syangbo Lama	Men's taijijian	Did not start	
Junu Syangbo Lama	Men's taijiquan	8.576	14
