= Judo at the 2021 Summer World University Games =

Judo competition

Judo Judo at the 2021 Summer World University Games
- Venue: Jianyang Cultural and Sports Centre Gymnasium
- Location: Jianyang, Sichuan, China
- Dates: 29 July–1 August 2023
- Competitors: 268 from 42 nations
- Website: Official website

Medalists
gold medal	Japan (9th title)
silver medal	South Korea
bronze medal	Germany

Champions
- Men's team: Japan (8th title)
- Women's team: Japan (8th title)

Competition at external databases
- Links: IJF • JudoInside

Judo was contested at the 2021 Summer World University Games at the Jianyang Cultural and Sports Centre Gymnasium in Jianyang, Sichuan, China from 29 July to 1 August 2023.

== Participating nations ==
354 Athletes from 46 Nations:

- Algeria (15)
- Argentina (1)
- Armenia (2)
- Austria (2)
- Azerbaijan (12)
- Brazil (16)
- China (16)
- Cyprus (3)
- Czech Republic (4)
- Spain (9)
- Estonia (1)
- Finland (3)
- France (16)
- Georgia (8)
- Germany (14)
- Haiti (1)
- Hungary (7)
- Indonesia (3)
- India (15)
- Iran (8)
- Italy (10)
- Japan (16)
- Kazakhstan (14)
- Kyrgyzstan (6)
- South Korea (16)
- Libya (2)
- Lithuania (3)
- Macau (4)
- Moldova (6)
- Mongolia (16)
- Mozambique (2)
- Netherlands (13)
- Nigeria (4)
- Peru (4)
- Poland (4)
- Portugal (2)
- South Africa (8)
- Switzerland (2)
- Slovakia (5)
- Chinese Taipei (12)
- Tajikistan (4)
- Turkmenistan (6)
- Turkey (8)
- Ukraine (5)
- United States (12)
- Uzbekistan (16)

== Medal table ==
* Host nation (China)

Rank	Nation	Gold	Silver	Bronze	Total
1	Japan	11	3	1	15
2	South Korea	2	4	4	10
3	Germany	1	2	3	6
4	Hungary	1	0	1	2
5	China*	1	0	0	1
6	Uzbekistan	0	2	1	3
7	Azerbaijan	0	1	3	4
8	France	0	1	2	3
8	Netherlands	0	1	2	3
10	Chinese Taipei	0	1	0	1
10	Moldova	0	1	0	1
12	Mongolia	0	0	4	4
13	Kazakhstan	0	0	3	3
14	Brazil	0	0	2	2
14	Georgia	0	0	2	2
16	India	0	0	1	1
16	Italy	0	0	1	1
16	Poland	0	0	1	1
16	Switzerland	0	0	1	1
Totals (19 entries)		16	16	32	64

== Medal summary ==
=== Men's events ===
Event	Gold	Silver	Bronze
Extra-lightweight (−60 kg)	Taiki Nakamura; Japan	Yang Yung-wei; Chinese Taipei	Jeon Seung-beom; South Korea
Extra-lightweight (−60 kg)	Taiki Nakamura; Japan	Yang Yung-wei; Chinese Taipei	Kamoliddin Bakhtiyorov; Uzbekistan
Half-lightweight (−66 kg)	Shinsei Hattori; Japan	Radu Izvoreanu; Moldova	Yashar Najafov; Azerbaijan
Half-lightweight (−66 kg)	Shinsei Hattori; Japan	Radu Izvoreanu; Moldova	Sunggat Zhubatkan; Kazakhstan
Lightweight (−73 kg)	Tatsuki Ishihara; Japan	Rashid Mammadaliyev; Azerbaijan	Odgereliin Uranbayar; Mongolia
Lightweight (−73 kg)	Tatsuki Ishihara; Japan	Rashid Mammadaliyev; Azerbaijan	Askar Narkulov; Kazakhstan
Half-middleweight (−81 kg)	Yoshito Hojo; Japan	Nurbek Murtozoev; Uzbekistan	Zaur Dvalashvili; Georgia
Half-middleweight (−81 kg)	Yoshito Hojo; Japan	Nurbek Murtozoev; Uzbekistan	Arnaud Aregba; France
Middleweight (−90 kg)	Roland Gőz; Hungary	Han Ju-yeop; South Korea	Kazuki Nakanishi; Japan
Middleweight (−90 kg)	Roland Gőz; Hungary	Han Ju-yeop; South Korea	Mark van Dijk; Netherlands
Half-heavyweight (−100 kg)	Falk Petersilka; Germany	Kaito Green; Japan	Bekarys Saduakas; Kazakhstan
Half-heavyweight (−100 kg)	Falk Petersilka; Germany	Kaito Green; Japan	Batkhuyagiin Gonchigsüren; Mongolia
Heavyweight (+100 kg)	Kim Min-jong; South Korea	Yuta Nakamura; Japan	Kacper Szczurowski; Poland
Heavyweight (+100 kg)	Kim Min-jong; South Korea	Yuta Nakamura; Japan	Irakli Demetrashvili; Georgia
Team	Japan; Taiki Nakamura; Shinsei Hattori; Tatsuki Ishihara; Yoshito Hojo; Kazuki Nakanishi; Kalanikaito Green; Yuta Nakamura	Uzbekistan; Kamoliddin Bakhtiyorov; Mukhammadkodir Mansurov; Nurbek Murtozoev; Abdurakhim Nutfulloev; Islombek Ravshankulov; Javokhirbek Saparov; Mukhammadali Tangriev	Azerbaijan; Eljan Hajiyev; Magerram Imamverdiev; Kanan Ismayilov; Rashid Mammadaliyev; Ruslan Nasirli; Toghrul Salmanov
Team	Japan; Taiki Nakamura; Shinsei Hattori; Tatsuki Ishihara; Yoshito Hojo; Kazuki Nakanishi; Kalanikaito Green; Yuta Nakamura	Uzbekistan; Kamoliddin Bakhtiyorov; Mukhammadkodir Mansurov; Nurbek Murtozoev; Abdurakhim Nutfulloev; Islombek Ravshankulov; Javokhirbek Saparov; Mukhammadali Tangriev	South Korea; An Jae-hong; Han Ju-yeop; Jeon Seung-beom; Kim Min-jong; Kim Se-heon; Lee Eun-kyul; Lee Joon-hwan

=== Women's events ===
Event	Gold	Silver	Bronze
Extra-lightweight (−48 kg)	Hikari Yoshioka; Japan	Amber Gersjes; Netherlands	Oh Yeon-ju; South Korea
Extra-lightweight (−48 kg)	Hikari Yoshioka; Japan	Amber Gersjes; Netherlands	Leyla Aliyeva; Azerbaijan
Half-lightweight (−52 kg)	Hibiki Shiraishi; Japan	Jang Se-yun; South Korea	Annika Würfel; Germany
Half-lightweight (−52 kg)	Hibiki Shiraishi; Japan	Jang Se-yun; South Korea	Róza Gyertyás; Hungary
Lightweight (−57 kg)	Huh Mi-mi; South Korea	Akari Omori; Japan	Martha Fawaz; France
Lightweight (−57 kg)	Huh Mi-mi; South Korea	Akari Omori; Japan	Yamini Mourya; India
Half-middleweight (−63 kg)	Kirari Yamaguchi; Japan	Agathe Devitry; France	Nadiah Krachten; Netherlands
Half-middleweight (−63 kg)	Kirari Yamaguchi; Japan	Agathe Devitry; France	Agatha Schmidt; Germany
Middleweight (−70 kg)	Mayu Honda; Japan	Samira Bock; Germany	Gioia Vetterli; Switzerland
Middleweight (−70 kg)	Mayu Honda; Japan	Samira Bock; Germany	Irene Pedrotti; Italy
Half-heavyweight (−78 kg)	Mizuki Sugimura; Japan	Lee Yun-seon; South Korea	Batbayaryn Erdenet-Od; Mongolia
Half-heavyweight (−78 kg)	Mizuki Sugimura; Japan	Lee Yun-seon; South Korea	Raffaela Igl; Germany
Heavyweight (+78 kg)	Jia Chundi; China	Park Saet-byeol; South Korea	Ágatha Silva; Brazil
Heavyweight (+78 kg)	Jia Chundi; China	Park Saet-byeol; South Korea	Dambadarjaagiin Nominzul; Mongolia
Team	Japan; Hibiki Shiraishi; Akari Omori; Kirari Yamaguchi; Mayu Honda; Mizuki Sugimura; Mao Arai	Germany; Annika Würfel; Laila Gobel; Agatha Schmidt; Samira Bock; Raffaella Igl	Brazil; Luana da Costa; Tainná Mota; Thayná Lemos; Maria Paula Lizardo; Shirlen Nascimento; Ágatha Silva; Millena da Silva
Team	Japan; Hibiki Shiraishi; Akari Omori; Kirari Yamaguchi; Mayu Honda; Mizuki Sugimura; Mao Arai	Germany; Annika Würfel; Laila Gobel; Agatha Schmidt; Samira Bock; Raffaella Igl	South Korea; Han Hee-ju; Huh Mi-mi; Jang Se-yun; Lee Yun-seon; Oh Yeon-ju; Park Saet-byeol; Shin Chae-won
