= Archery at the 2021 Summer World University Games – Women's team recurve =

Men's team recurve at the 2021 Summer World University Games
- Venue: Shuangliu Modern Pentathlon Centre
- Location: Chengdu, China
- Dates: 27 – 30 July 2023
- Competitors: 33 from 11 nations

Medalists
gold medal	Wang Limin; Zhou Danyan; Li Xinxin	China
silver medal	Lee Ga-hyun; Kim So-hee; Choi Mi-sun	South Korea
bronze medal	Sangeeta Sangeeta; Reeta Sawaiyan; Tanisha Verma	India

The women's team recurve archery competition at the 2021 Summer World University Games was held in the Shuangliu Modern Pentathlon Centre, Chengdu, China between July 27 and 30.

== Records ==
Prior to the competition, the world and Universiade records were as follows.

- 216 arrows qualification round

Category	Team	Athlete	Score	Record	Date	Place	Event
World record	South Korea	Kang Chae-young	691	2053	21 May 2018	Antalya, Turkey	2018 Archery World Cup second stage
World record	South Korea	Chang Hye-jin	683	2053	21 May 2018	Antalya, Turkey	2018 Archery World Cup second stage
World record	South Korea	Lee Eun-gyeong	679	2053	21 May 2018	Antalya, Turkey	2018 Archery World Cup second stage
Universiade record	South Korea (KOR)	Ki Bo-bae	686	2038	4 July 2015	Gwangju, South Korea	2015 Summer Universiade
Universiade record	South Korea (KOR)	Kang Chae-young	679	2038	4 July 2015	Gwangju, South Korea	2015 Summer Universiade
Universiade record	South Korea (KOR)	Choi Mi-sun	673	2038	4 July 2015	Gwangju, South Korea	2015 Summer Universiade

== Qualification round ==
The ranking round took place on 27 July 2023 to determine the seeding for the elimination rounds. It consisted of three archers' results in individual event, with a maximum score of 2160.

Rank	Team	Archer	Individual			Team		
Rank	Team	Archer	Score	10s	Xs	Total	10s	Xs
1	South Korea	Lee Ga-hyun	681	38	18	2012	98	46
1	South Korea	Kim So-hee	668	32	16	2012	98	46
1	South Korea	Choi Mi-sun	663	28	12	2012	98	46
2	China	Wang Limin	668	31	11	1963	77	27
2	China	Zhou Danyan	650	26	11	1963	77	27
2	China	Li Xinxin	645	20	5	1963	77	27
3	Chinese Taipei	Peng Chia-mao	653	24	4	1927	63	12
3	Chinese Taipei	Li Tsai-chi	649	24	6	1927	63	12
3	Chinese Taipei	Sui Yun-ching	625	15	2	1927	63	12
4	France	Mélanie Gaubil	654	29	12	1917	67	19
4	France	Aziliz Ramel	645	20	1	1917	67	19
4	France	Anaëlle Florent	618	18	6	1917	67	19
5	Japan	Waka Sonoda	665	27	11	1914	57	15
5	Japan	Kanae Sueki	632	21	4	1914	57	15
5	Japan	Rena Mayumi	617	9	0	1914	57	15
6	India	Sangeeta Sangeeta	629	19	5	1856	46	16
6	India	Reeta Sawaiyan	629	15	6	1856	46	16
6	India	Tanisha Verma	598	12	5	1856	46	16
7	United States	Judith Gottlieb	626	17	7	1844	44	13
7	United States	Katherine Wu	620	17	3	1844	44	13
7	United States	Natalie Howell	598	10	3	1844	44	13
8	Kazakhstan	Diana Tursunbek	634	21	5	1828	39	11
8	Kazakhstan	Yelizaveta Avdeyeva	598	12	5	1828	39	11
8	Kazakhstan	Madina Zaemova	596	6	1	1828	39	11
9	Italy	Aiko Rolando	636	18	2	1791	37	9
9	Italy	Nicole Degani	596	14	6	1791	37	9
9	Italy	Sara Noceti	559	5	1	1791	37	9
10	Poland	Sylwia Zyzańska	618	14	3	1779	33	8
10	Poland	Klaudia Plaza	612	12	3	1779	33	8
10	Poland	Kamila Napłoszek	549	7	2	1779	33	8
11	Malaysia	Nur Afisa Abdul Halil	614	9	3	1856	25	8
11	Malaysia	Nur Ain Ayuni Fozi	588	8	3	1856	25	8
11	Malaysia	Nuramalia Haneesha Mazlan	554	8	2	1856	25	8

== Elimination round ==
The results are as below.

Round of 16
9	Italy	3	47	52	44	49
8	Kazakhstan	5	47	50	48	50
11	Malaysia	1	47	52	47
6	India	5	54	52	48
7	United States	4	48	44	47	52	26
10	Poland	5	51	39	49	40	26+

Quarter-finals
1	South Korea	6	54	51	56	56
8	Kazakhstan	2	55	47	49	49
5	Japan	1	55	46	53
4	France	5	56	46	54
3	Chinese Taipei	4	54	50	51	55	23
6	India	5	52	53	56	52	24
10	Poland	4	47	55	56	44	24
2	China	5	57	53	54	52	27

Semi-finals
1	South Korea	6	56	57	58
4	France	0	47	51	55
6	India	4	53	56	50	53	25
2	China	5	53	55	50	57	29

Gold medal match
1	South Korea	4	46	55	55	53	27
2	China	5	54	53	52	54	28
Bronze medal match
4	France	4	49	52	49	52	19
India	5	52	50	53	35	28
