= Wushu at the 2021 Summer World University Games =

- Venue: Chengbei Gymnasium
- Date: 29 July–3 August 2023
- Competitors: 131 from 30 nations

Wushu at the 2021 Summer World University Games is being held in Chengbei Gymnasium in Jinniu District, Chengdu, Sichuan, China, from 29 July to 3 August 2023. This sport is one of the three optional sports being held at the event, in addition to rowing and shooting.

== Participant nations ==
139 athletes from 30 nations participated at the 2021 Summer World University Games.On 26 July 2023, the Indian Wushu withdraw team from the games, in order to protest against the issuance of stapled visas instead of stamped visas to three of the athletes who are from Arunachal Pradesh.

- Algeria (8)
- Armenia (2)
- Australia (1)
- Austria (1)
- Azerbaijan (2)
- Brazil (4)
- Brunei (2)
- China (8)
- Spain (3)
- France (2)
- Hong Kong (7)
- Indonesia (8)
- ~~India (8)~~
- Iran (8)
- Japan (4)
- Kazakhstan (5)
- South Korea (7)
- Macau (6)
- Malaysia (4)
- Netherlands (1)
- Nepal (4)
- Pakistan (1)
- Philippines (5)
- Singapore (4)
- Chinese Taipei (8)
- Thailand (3)
- Turkmenistan (4)
- Turkey (6)
- Ukraine (2)
- United States (6)
- Uzbekistan (5)

== Medal summary ==
=== Medal table ===
* Host nation (China)

Rank	Nation	Gold	Silver	Bronze	Total
1	China (CHN)*	11	0	1	12
2	Indonesia (INA)	4	3	0	7
3	Macau (MAC)	1	3	3	7
4	Iran (IRI)	1	2	3	6
5	Chinese Taipei (TPE)	1	1	2	4
5	Hong Kong (HKG)	1	1	2	4
7	Malaysia (MAS)	1	0	3	4
8	Japan (JPN)	0	2	3	5
9	Turkey (TUR)	0	2	2	4
10	South Korea (KOR)	0	1	1	2
10	Uzbekistan (UZB)	0	1	1	2
12	Brunei (BRU)	0	1	0	1
12	France (FRA)	0	1	0	1
12	Singapore (SIN)	0	1	0	1
12	United States (USA)	0	1	0	1
16	Kazakhstan (KAZ)	0	0	2	2
17	Armenia (ARM)	0	0	1	1
17	Thailand (THA)	0	0	1	1
17	Turkmenistan (TKM)	0	0	1	1
Totals (19 entries)		20	20	26	66

Source: Medal&Rank

=== Men's taolu ===
Event	Gold	Silver	Bronze
Changquan	Jin Zhedian; China	Edgar Xavier Marvelo; Indonesia	Chen Yue-xi; Chinese Taipei
Daoshu	Jin Zhedian; China	Edgar Xavier Marvelo; Indonesia	Ang Qi Yue; Malaysia
Gunshu	Seyed Mohammad Hosseini; Iran	Alex Zhaoyi Ni; United States	Lei Cheok Ieong; Macau
Nanquan	Cao Maoyuan; China	Lau Chi Lung; Hong Kong	Shahin Banitalebi; Iran
Nangun	Cao Maoyuan; China	Cheung Ioi Chit; Macau	Calvin Lee Wai Leong; Malaysia
Taijiquan	Sun Chia-hung; Chinese Taipei	Tay Yu Xuan; Singapore	Tak Yan Samuei Hui; Hong Kong
Taijijian	Tak Yan Samuei Hui; Hong Kong	Sun Chia-hung; Chinese Taipei	Tohma Ebina; Japan

=== Men's sanda ===
Event	Gold	Silver	Bronze
52 kg	Laksmana Pandu Pratama; Indonesia	Mehmet Demirci; Turkey	Zhirayr Petrosyan; Armenia
52 kg	Laksmana Pandu Pratama; Indonesia	Mehmet Demirci; Turkey	Armen Pangchai; Thailand
60 kg	Ma Yigu; China	Bintang Reindra Nada Guitara; Indonesia	Shoja Panahi; Iran
60 kg	Ma Yigu; China	Bintang Reindra Nada Guitara; Indonesia	Bexultan Koskenov; Kazakhstan
70 kg	He Feng; China	Hamid Reza Sahandi; Iran	Song Gi-cheol; South Korea
70 kg	He Feng; China	Hamid Reza Sahandi; Iran	Nusret Altunkaya; Turkey
80 kg	Liu Wenlong; China	Ali Khorshidi; Iran	Cai Fei Long; Macau
80 kg	Liu Wenlong; China	Ali Khorshidi; Iran	Azizbek Isroilov; Uzbekistan

=== Women's taolu ===
Event	Gold	Silver	Bronze
Changquan	Nandhira Mauriskha; Indonesia	Moka Furukawa; Japan	Lin Chien-hsi; Chinese Taipei
Jianshu	Nandhira Mauriskha; Indonesia	Wong Weng Ian; Macau	Moka Furukawa; Japan
Qiangshu	Tammy Tan Hui Ling; Malaysia	Wong Weng Ian; Macau	Hui Yu Lydia Sham; Hong Kong
Nanquan	Wong Sam In; Macau	Darya Latisheva; Uzbekistan	Song Cuifang; China
Nandao	Song Cuifang; China	Je Ga-yeong; South Korea	Wong Sam In; Macau
Taijiquan	Chen Xiaoli; China	Rise Shoji; Japan	Mandy Cebelle Chen; Malaysia
Taijijian	Chen Xiaoli; China	Basma Lachkar; Brunei	Rise Shoji; Japan

=== Women's sanda ===
Event	Gold	Silver	Bronze
52 kg	Tharisa Dea Florentina; Indonesia	Maiwen Bahija Virgillia Ruggieri; France	Aygozel Gurbangeldiyeva; Turkmenistan
52 kg	Tharisa Dea Florentina; Indonesia	Maiwen Bahija Virgillia Ruggieri; France	Hayriye Türksoy Hançer; Turkey
60 kg	Li Zhiqin; China	Berna Tut; Turkey	Mohana Rahimi; Iran
60 kg	Li Zhiqin; China	Berna Tut; Turkey	Aigerim Torekhanova; Kazakhstan

== Event results ==
=== Men's taolu ===
==== Changquan ====
Rank	Athlete	Score
1st place, gold medalist(s)	Jin Zhedian (CHN)	9.723
2nd place, silver medalist(s)	Edgar Xavier Marvelo (INA)	9.716
3rd place, bronze medalist(s)	Chen Yue-xi (TPE)	9.706
4	Rutsuki Nakada (JPN)	9.650
5	Ong Zi Meng (SGP)	9.593
6	Bijay Sinjali (NEP)	9.530
7	Ang Qi Yue (MAS)	9.523
8	Loan Évan Drouard (FRA)	9.516
9	Necmettin Erbakan Akyüz (TUR)	9.506
10	Oleksii Kolisnyk (UKR)	9.410
11	José Javier Castro Moreno (ESP)	9.400
12	Aziz Kakhramonov (UZB)	9.366
13	Jose Efren Paolo delos Trinos (PHI)	9.086
14	Haithem Kabes (ALG)	9.020
DNS	Bhanu Singh (IND)	

==== Daoshu ====
Rank	Athlete	Score
1st place, gold medalist(s)	Jin Zhedian (CHN)	9.716
2nd place, silver medalist(s)	Edgar Xavier Marvelo (INA)	9.703
3rd place, bronze medalist(s)	Ang Qi Yue (MAS)	9.660
4	Lei Cheok Ieong (MAC)	9.653
5	Ong Zi Meng (SGP)	9.630
6	Chen Yue-xi (TPE)	9.600
7	Necmettin Erbakan Akyüz (TUR)	9.570
8	Alex Zhaoyi Ni (USA)	9.566
9	José Javier Castro Moreno (ESP)	9.530
10	Jose Efren Paolo delos Trinos (PHI)	9.166
11	Seyed Mohammad Hosseini (IRI)	9.086

==== Gunshu ====
Rank	Athlete	Score
1st place, gold medalist(s)	Seyed Mohammad Hosseini (IRI)	9.660
2nd place, silver medalist(s)	Alex Zhaoyi Ni (USA)	9.610
3rd place, bronze medalist(s)	Lei Cheok Ieong (MAC)	9.600
4	Loan Évan Drouard (FRA)	9.550
5	Rutsuki Nakada (JPN)	9.543
6	Haithem Kabes (ALG)	9.416

==== Nanquan ====
Rank	Athlete	Score
1st place, gold medalist(s)	Cao Maoyuan (CHN)	9.770
2nd place, silver medalist(s)	Lau Chi Lung (HKG)	9.570
3rd place, bronze medalist(s)	Shahin Banitalebi (IRI)	9.566
4	Yun Dong-hae (KOR)	9.416
5	Daniel Hu (USA)	9.350
6	Calvin Lee Wai Leong (MAS)	9.333
7	Cheung Ioi Chit (MAC)	9.316
8	Aldán Pose Martínez (ESP)	9.133
9	Brandon Suan Heng Foo (AUS)	9.080
10	Daniel Shing Yi Chen (BRA)	9.076

==== Nangun ====
Rank	Athlete	Score
1st place, gold medalist(s)	Cao Maoyuan (CHN)	9.753
2nd place, silver medalist(s)	Cheung Ioi Chit (MAC)	9.660
3rd place, bronze medalist(s)	Calvin Lee Wai Leong (MAS)	9.653
4	Yun Dong-hae (KOR)	9.643
5	Shahin Banitalebi (IRI)	9.623
6	Lau Chi Lung (HKG)	9.593
7	Daniel Shing Yi Chen (BRA)	9.536
8	Brandon Suan Heng Foo (AUS)	9.330
9	Daniel Hu (USA)	9.330
10	Aldán Pose Martínez (ESP)	9.036
DNS	Bijay Sinjali (NEP)	

==== Taijiquan ====
Rank	Athlete	Score
1st place, gold medalist(s)	Sun Chia-hung (TPE)	9.693
2nd place, silver medalist(s)	Tay Yu Xuan (SGP)	9.676
3rd place, bronze medalist(s)	Tak Yan Samuei Hui (HKG)	9.660
4	Tohma Ebina (JPN)	9.653
5	Hosea Zheng Yu Wong (BRU)	9.606
6	Jo Saelee (THA)	9.556
7	An Hyeon-gi (KOR)	9.540
8	Nicholas Fang (INA)	9.446
9	Raymund Pablo (PHI)	9.253
10	Lahcene Ouidir (ALG)	9.250
11	Pasang Sherpa (NEP)	8.720
DNS	Sanma Brahma (IND)	

==== Taijijian ====
Rank	Athlete	Score
1st place, gold medalist(s)	Tak Yan Samuei Hui (HKG)	9.726
2nd place, silver medalist(s)	Sun Chia-hung (TPE)	9.710
3rd place, bronze medalist(s)	Tohma Ebina (JPN)	9.666
4	Tay Yu Xuan (SGP)	9.576
5	An Hyeon-gi (KOR)	9.536
6	Nicholas Fang (INA)	9.483
7	Hosea Zheng Yu Wong (BRU)	9.463
8	Jo Saelee (THA)	9.293
9	Raymund Pablo (PHI)	9.026
10	Lahcene Ouidir (ALG)	9.020
11	Pasang Sherpa (NEP)	8.860
DNS	Sanma Brahma (IND)	

=== Men's sanda ===
==== 52 kg ====
Quarterfinals
Laksmana Pandu Pratama (INA)	2
Saydullo Abdurashitov (UZB)	0
Ho Ho Wang (HKG)	0
Armen Pangchai (THA)	2
Salim Moziane (ALG)	0
Zhirayr Petrosyan (ARM)	2
Mehmet Demirci (TUR)	WPD
Hong yu-zhe (TPE)

Semifinals
Laksmana Pandu Pratama (INA)	2
Armen Pangchai (THA)	0
Zhirayr Petrosyan (ARM)	0
Mehmet Demirci (TUR)	2

Finals
Laksmana Pandu Pratama (INA)	2
Mehmet Demirci (TUR)	0

==== 60 kg ====
First round
Gabriel Pedroso de Almeida (BRA)
Parviz Abiyev (AZE)	2
Kim Min-soo (KOR)	0
Shoja Panahigelehkolaei (IRI)	2
Hou Chih-han (TPE)	0
Bintang Reindra Nada Guitara (INA)	2

Second round
Ma Yigu (CHN)	WPD
Parviz Abiyev (AZE)
Bexultan Koskenov (KAZ)	2
Agajumageldi Yazymov (TKM)	0
Jet Millard dela Vega (PHI)
Shoja Panahigelehkolaei (IRI)	WPD
Bintang Reindra Nada Guitara (INA)	2
Ausma Pengthai (THA)	0

Semifinals
Ma Yigu (CHN)	2
Bexultan Koskenov (KAZ)	0
Shoja Panahigelehkolaei (IRI)	0
Bintang Reindra Nada Guitara (INA)	2

Finals
Ma Yigu (CHN)	2
Bintang Reindra Nada Guitara (INA)	0

==== 70 kg ====
First round
Hamidreza Sahandi (IRI)	2
Vincent Fan Sheng Meng (USA)	0
Maskat Handurdyyev (TKM)	0
Song Gi-cheol (KOR)	2
Harry Brahmana (INA)	2
Zhang Huan-yi (TPE)	1
Davit Vardanyan (ARM)	2
Mahar Asadzade (AZE)	0
Nusret Kayhan Altunkaya (TUR)	2
Mukhammadali Yuldashev (UZB)	0
Sofiane Semane (ALG)	1
Cheung Yat Lam (HKG)	2

Second round
Rassul Turganzhanov (KAZ)	0
Hamidreza Sahandi (IRI)	2
Song Gi-cheol (KOR)	2
Harry Brahmana (INA)	0
Davit Vardanyan (ARM)	0
Nusret Kayhan Altunkaya (TUR)	2
Cheung Yat Lam (HKG)
He Feng (CHN)	WPD

Semifinals
Hamidreza Sahandi (IRI)	2
Song Gi-cheol (KOR)	0
Nusret Kayhan Altunkaya (TUR)
He Feng (CHN)	WPD

Finals
Hamidreza Sahandi (IRI)	0
He Feng (CHN)	2

==== 80 kg ====
Quarterfinals
Azizbek Isroilov (UZB)	2
Meylis Rahmanov (TKM)	0
Jo Sang-hun (KOR)	0
Cai Fei Long (MAC)	2
Liu Wenlong (CHN)	2
Abdurashid Abdullayev (KAZ)	0

Semifinals
Ali Khorshidirabie (IRI)	WPD
Azizbek Isroilov (UZB)
Cai Fei Long (MAC)	DI
Liu Wenlong (CHN)

Finals
Ali Khorshidirabie (IRI)	0
Liu Wenlong (CHN)	2

=== Women's taolu ===
==== Changquan ====
Rank	Athlete	Score
1st place, gold medalist(s)	Nandhira Mauriskha (INA)	9.600
2nd place, silver medalist(s)	Moka Furukawa (JPN)	9.596
3rd place, bronze medalist(s)	Lin Chien-shi (TPE)	9.453
4	Le Yin Shuen (SGP)	9.366
5	Lina Aït Messaoud (ALG)	9.040
6	Ângela Flávia Ximenes da Silva (BRA)	8.816
7	Eva Parra López de Toro (ESP)	8.000
DNS	Nyeman Wangsu (IND)	
DNS	Aidyn Abdibay (KAZ)	

==== Jianshu ====
Rank	Athlete	Score
1st place, gold medalist(s)	Nandhira Mauriskha (INA)	9.660
2nd place, silver medalist(s)	Wong Weng Ian (MAC)	9.656
3rd place, bronze medalist(s)	Moka Furukawa (JPN)	9.626
4	Tammy Tan Hui Ling (MAS)	9.623
5	Hui Yu Lydia Sham (HKG)	9.576
6	Lin Chien-shi (TPE)	9.543
7	Le Yin Shuen (SGP)	9.473
8	Monireh Panahi Dorcheh (IRI)	9.456
9	Isabelle Lee Miller (USA)	9.446
10	Lina Aït Messaoud (ALG)	8.783
11	Felicia Ziyi Liu (AUT)	8.516
12	Eva Parra López de Toro (ESP)	8.406

==== Qiangshu ====
Rank	Athlete	Score
1st place, gold medalist(s)	Tammy Tan Hui Ling (MAS)	9.613
2nd place, silver medalist(s)	Wong Weng Ian (MAC)	9.593
3rd place, bronze medalist(s)	Hui Yu Lydia Sham (HKG)	9.583
4	Monireh Panahi Dorcheh (IRI)	9.506
5	Isabelle Lee Miller (USA)	8.866

==== Nanquan ====
Rank	Athlete	Score
1st place, gold medalist(s)	Wong Sam In (MAC)	9.643
2nd place, silver medalist(s)	Darya Latisheva (UZB)	9.633
3rd place, bronze medalist(s)	Song Cuifang (CHN)	9.630
4	Fatemeh Heidari (IRI)	9.590
5	Lau Po Yan (HKG)	9.526
6	Nima Gharti Magar (NEP)	9.270
7	Louiza Aït Mouloud (ALG)	9.213
8	Je Ga-yeong (KOR)	9.210
DNS	Ghiel Rhaisa Figueras (PHI)	

==== Nandao ====
Rank	Athlete	Score
1st place, gold medalist(s)	Song Cuifang (CHN)	9.666
2nd place, silver medalist(s)	Je Ga-yeong (KOR)	9.530
3rd place, bronze medalist(s)	Wong Sam In (MAC)	9.506
4	Lau Po Yan (HKG)	9.470
5	Nima Gharti Magar (NEP)	9.393
6	Fatemeh Heidari (IRI)	9.386
7	Darya Latisheva (UZB)	9.113
8	Louiza Aït Mouloud (ALG)	8.616
DNF	Ghiel Rhaisa Figueras (PHI)	

==== Taijiquan ====
Rank	Athlete	Score
1st place, gold medalist(s)	Chen Xiaoli (CHN)	9.753
2nd place, silver medalist(s)	Rise Shoji (JPN)	9.680
3rd place, bronze medalist(s)	Mandy Cebelle Chen (MAS)	9.633
4	Liu Pei-hsun (TPE)	9.606
5	Zefanya Adelia Sidharta (INA)	9.603
6	Judy Liu (USA)	9.596
7	Basma Lachkar (BRU)	9.596
8	Teo Yu Xuan (SGP)	9.586
9	Choi Yu-jeong (KOR)	9.493
10	Oryna Ivanova (UKR)	9.303
11	Nil Hayat Özüpek (TUR)	9.176
12	Felicia Ziyi Liu (AUT)	9.066
13	Violette G.J. Husslage (NED)	8.860
14	Junu Syangbo Lama (NEP)	8.576
DNS	Mepung Lamgu (IND)	

==== Taijijian ====
Rank	Athlete	Score
1st place, gold medalist(s)	Chen Xiaoli (CHN)	9.746
2nd place, silver medalist(s)	Basma Lachkar (BRU)	9.680
3rd place, bronze medalist(s)	Rise Shoji (JPN)	9.660
4	Zefanya Adelia Sidharta (INA)	9.650
5	Mandy Cebelle Chen (MAS)	9.640
6	Oryna Ivanova (UKR)	9.630
7	Liu Pei-hsun (TPE)	9.596
8	Judy Liu (USA)	9.576
9	Choi Yu-jeong (KOR)	9.520
10	Teo Yu Xuan (SGP)	9.493
11	Nil Hayat Özüpek (TUR)	9.476
12	Violette G.J. Husslage (NED)	9.380
DNS	Junu Syangbo Lama (NEP)	
DNS	Mepung Lamgu (IND)	

=== Women's sanda ===
==== 52 kg ====
Quarterfinals
Tharisa Dea Florentina (INA)	WPD
Chen Si-yun (TPE)
Liang Xue Zhen (MAC)	0
Hayriye Türksoy Hançer (TUR)	2
Hadjer Dounia Beldi Otmane (ALG)	0
Maiwen Bahija Virgillia Ruggieri (FRA)	2
Fizza Hazara (PAK)	0
Aygozel Gurbangeldiyeva (TKM)	2

Semifinals
Tharisa Dea Florentina (INA)	2
Hayriye Türksoy Hançer (TUR)	0
Maiwen Bahija Virgillia Ruggieri (FRA)	2
Aygozel Gurbangeldiyeva (TKM)	0

Finals
Tharisa Dea Florentina (INA)	2
Maiwen Bahija Virgillia Ruggieri (FRA)	0

==== 60 kg ====
Quarterfinals
Berna Tut (TUR)	2
Lydia Guemlal (ALG)	0
Li Zhiqin (CHN)	2
Beatriz Adrião Rustice Silva (BRA)	0
Li Ka Yee (HKG)	0
Mohana Rahimi (IRI)	2

Semifinals
Aigerim Torekhanova (KAZ)	0
Berna Tut (TUR)	2
Li Zhiqin (CHN)	2
Mohana Rahimi (IRI)	0

Finals
Berna Tut (TUR)	0
Li Zhiqin (CHN)	2
