= Libya at the 2021 Summer World University Games =

- Flag of Libya
- IOC code: LBA

in Chengdu, China 28 July 2023 – 8 August 2023
- Competitors: 4 (4 men)
- Medals: Gold 0 Silver 0 Bronze 0 Total 0

Summer World University Games appearances
- 1959; 1961; 1963; 1965; 1967; 1970; 1973; 1975; 1977; 1979; 1981; 1983; 1985; 1987; 1989; 1991; 1993; 1995; 1997; 1999; 2001; 2003; 2005; 2007; 2009; 2011; 2013; 2015; 2017; 2019; 2021; 2025; 2027

Libya competed at the 2021 Summer World University Games in Chengdu, China held from 28 July to 8 August 2023.

== Competitors ==
| Sport | Men | Women | Total |
|---|---|---|---|
| Fencing | 1 | 0 | 1 |
| Judo | 2 | 0 | 2 |
| Taekwondo | 1 | 0 | 1 |

== Fencing ==
| Athlete | Event | Group stage | | | | | | | Round of 128 | Round of 64 | Round of 32 | Round of 16 | Quarter-finals | Semi-finals | Final / BM | |
| Athlete | Event | Opponent score | Opponent score | Opponent score | Opponent score | Opponent score | Opponent score | Rank | Opponent score | Opponent score | Opponent score | Opponent score | Opponent score | Opponent score | Opponent score | Rank |
|---|---|---|---|---|---|---|---|---|---|---|---|---|---|---|---|---|
| Ali Talib | Men's individual épée | Sidikov (UZB); L 0–5 | Alzarooni (UAE); L 1–5 | Michalak (POL); L 0–5 | Tauriainen (FIN); L 0–5 | Eskov (EST); L 0–5 | Matsumoto (JPN); L 3–5 | 102 | Did not advance | | | | | | | |

== Judo ==
Men

| Athlete | Event | Round of 32 | Round of 16 | Quarter-finals | Semi-finals | Repechage | Final / BM | |
| Athlete | Event | Opponent score | Opponent score | Opponent score | Opponent score | Opponent score | Opponent score | Rank |
|---|---|---|---|---|---|---|---|---|
| Mustafa Ben Issa | Men's 60 kg | Liu (CHN); L 00–10 | Did not advance | | | | | |
| Ahmed Sulayman | Men's 81 kg | Ahmadzadeh (IRI); L 00–10 | Did not advance | | | | | |

== Taekwondo ==
Kyorugi

| Athlete | Event | Round of 32 | Round of 16 | Quarter-finals | Semi-finals | Final | |
| Athlete | Event | Opponent score | Opponent score | Opponent score | Opponent score | Opponent score | Rank |
|---|---|---|---|---|---|---|---|
| Najimuldin Birzeeq | Men's 68 kg | Szczesnowski (POL); L 0–2 | Did not advance | | | | |
