= Archery at the 2021 Summer World University Games =

- Venue: Shuangliu Modern Pentathlon Centre
- Dates: 27–31 July 2023
- Competitors: 185 from 32 nations

Archery was contested at the 2021 Summer World University Games from 27 to 31 July at the Shuangliu Modern Pentathlon Centre in Shuangliu District, Chengdu China.

== Medal table ==
* Host nation (China)

Rank	Nation	Gold	Silver	Bronze	Total
1	South Korea	4	3	1	8
2	India	3	1	3	7
3	China*	2	0	0	2
4	Japan	1	1	0	2
5	Chinese Taipei	0	1	3	4
6	France	0	1	0	1
6	Kazakhstan	0	1	0	1
6	South Africa	0	1	0	1
6	United States	0	1	0	1
10	Italy	0	0	2	2
11	Iran	0	0	1	1
Totals (11 entries)		10	10	10	30

== Medalists ==
=== Recurve ===
Event	Gold	Silver	Bronze
Men's individual	Seo Min-gi; South Korea	Yuki Kawata; Japan	Reza Shabani; Iran
Men's team	South Korea; Choi Doo-hee; Kim Pil-joong; Seo Min-gi	Chinese Taipei; Chang Yi-chung; Kuo Yu-cheng; Yang Zong-han	Italy; Matteo Bilisari; Francesco Gregori; Matteo Borsani
Women's individual	Choi Mi-sun; South Korea	Diana Tursunbek; Kazakhstan	Peng Chia-mao; Chinese Taipei
Women's team	China; Zhou Danyan; Wang Limin; Li Xinxin	South Korea; Lee Ga-hyun; Kim So-hee; Choi Mi-sun	India; Sangeeta Chauhan; Tanisha Verma; Reeta Sawaiyan
Mixed team	Japan; Tetsuya Aoshima; Waka Sonoda	South Korea; Seo Min-gi; Lee Ga-hyun	Italy; Matteo Bilisari; Aiko Rolando

=== Compound ===
Event	Gold	Silver	Bronze
Men's individual	Sangampreet Singh Bisla; India	Christian de Klerk; South Africa	Aman Saini; India
Men's team	China; Du Meiyu; Chen Yansong; Wang Shikun	France; Victor Bouleau; Rémy Albanese; Nathan Cadronet	India; Aman Saini; Sangampreet Singh Bisla; Rishabh Yadav
Women's individual	Kaur Avneet; India	Alyssa Sturgill; United States	Cho Su-a; South Korea
Women's team	South Korea; Cho Su-a; Sim Soo-in; Han Seung-yeon	India; Purvasha Sudhir Shende; Pragati Choudhary; Kaur Avneet	Chinese Taipei; Hsu Yen-hua; Lin Ming-ching; Lo Yi-hsuan
Mixed team	India; Aman Saini; Pragati Choudhary	South Korea; Cho Su-a; Park Seung-hyun	Chinese Taipei; Wu Z-wei; Lin Ming-ching

== Participant NUSFs ==
185 archers from 32 National University Sporting Federations (NUSFs) participated in the 2021 Summer World University Games.

- Australia (4)
- Austria (2)
- Azerbaijan (2)
- China (12)
- Czech Republic (1)
- Finland (2)
- France (10)
- Germany (2)
- Greece (2)
- Hong Kong (8)
- Hungary (1)
- India (12)
- Iran (8)
- Italy (12)
- Japan (6)
- Kazakhstan (12)
- South Korea (12)
- Malaysia (12)
- Moldova (2)
- Mongolia (9)
- Netherlands (1)
- Philippines (1)
- Poland (7)
- Singapore (8)
- Slovakia (3)
- Slovenia (1)
- South Africa (3)
- Switzerland (3)
- Chinese Taipei (12)
- Turkey (3)
- Ukraine (4)
- United States (8)
