= Pakistan at the 2021 Summer World University Games =

- Flag of Pakistan
- IOC code: PAK

in Chengdu, China 28 July 2023 – 8 August 2023
- Competitors: 5 (5 women)
- Medals: Gold 0 Silver 0 Bronze 0 Total 0

Summer World University Games appearances
- 1959; 1961; 1963; 1965; 1967; 1970; 1973; 1975; 1977; 1979; 1981; 1983; 1985; 1987; 1989; 1991; 1993; 1995; 1997; 1999; 2001; 2003; 2005; 2007; 2009; 2011; 2013; 2015; 2017; 2019; 2021; 2025; 2027

Pakistan competed at the 2021 Summer World University Games in Chengdu, China held from 28 July to 8 August 2023.

== Competitors ==
Sport	Men	Women	Total
Athletics	0	2	2
Taekwondo	0	2	2
Wushu	0	1	1
Total	0	5	5

== Athletics ==
Women
Field

Athlete	Event	Qualification		Final	
Athlete	Event	Result	Rank	Result	Rank
Uzma Azam	Hammer throw	35.57	17	Did not advance	
Amtul Rehman	Long jump	5.20	29	Did not advance	
Amtul Rehman	Triple jump	11.16	20	Did not advance	

== Taekwondo ==
Kyorugi

Athlete	Event	Round of 32	Round of 16	Quarter-finals	Semi-finals	Final	
Athlete	Event	Opponent score	Opponent score	Opponent score	Opponent score	Opponent score	Rank
Maliha Ali	Women's 67 kg	Bye	Lin (TPE); L 0–2	Did not advance			
Manisha Ali	Women's 73 kg	—N/a	Zhou (CHN); L 0–2	Did not advance			

== Wushu ==
Sanda

Athlete	Event	Quarter-finals	Semi-finals	Final	
Athlete	Event	Opponent score	Opponent score	Opponent score	Rank
Fizza Hazara	Women's 52 kg	Gurbangeldiyeva (TKM); L 0–2	Did not advance		
