= Syria at the 2021 Summer World University Games =

Syria at the 2021 Summer Universiade
- IOC code: SYR
- NOC: Syrian Olympic Committee
- Website: http://www.syriaolymp.org/

in Chendu, China 28 July 2023 – 8 August 2023
- Competitors: 1 in 1 sport
- Medals: Gold 0 Silver 0 Bronze 0 Total 0

Summer Universiade appearances
- 1959; 1961; 1963; 1965; 1967; 1970; 1973; 1975; 1977; 1979; 1981; 1983; 1985; 1987; 1989; 1991; 1993; 1995; 1997; 1999; 2001; 2003; 2005; 2007; 2009; 2011; 2013; 2015; 2017; 2019; 2021; 2025; 2027

Syria competed at the 2021 Summer World University Games in Chengdu, China held from 28 July to 8 August 2023.

== Competitors ==
| Sport | Men | Women | Total |
|---|---|---|---|
| Taekwondo | 0 | 1 | 1 |

== Taekwondo ==
Kyorugi

| Athlete | Event | Round of 32 | Round of 16 | Quarter-finals | Semi-finals | Final | |
| Athlete | Event | Opponent score | Opponent score | Opponent score | Opponent score | Opponent score | Rank |
|---|---|---|---|---|---|---|---|
| Shams Ahmad | Women's 57 kg | Bye | Shrestha (NEP); W 2–0 | Kim (KOR); L 0–02 | Did not advance | | 7 |

Poomsae

| Athlete | Event | Preliminary | | Semi-finals | | Final | |
| Athlete | Event | Score | Rank | Score | Rank | Score | Rank |
|---|---|---|---|---|---|---|---|
| Shams Ahmad | Women's individual | Did not start | | | | | |
