= Malaysia at the 2021 Summer World University Games =

- Flag of Malaysia
- IOC code: MAS
- National federation: Malaysian University Sports Council
- Website: www.masum.org.my

in Chengdu, China 28 July 2023 – 8 August 2023
- Competitors: 66 (35 men and 31 women) in 8 sports
- Flag bearer: Muhammad Syafiq Zuber
- Officials: 30
- Medals Ranked 27th: Gold 1 Silver 1 Bronze 5 Total 7

Summer World University Games appearances (overview)
- 1985; 1987; 1989; 1991; 1993; 1995; 1997; 1999; 2001; 2003; 2005; 2007; 2009; 2011; 2013; 2015; 2017; 2019; 2021; 2025; 2027

Malaysia competed at the 2021 Summer World University Games in Chengdu, China, from 28 July to 8 August 2023 that was postponed due to the COVID-19 pandemic. Prof. Ts. Dr. Mohd. Rusllim Mohamed, Chairman of the Malaysian University Sports Council (MASUM) was the chef de mission of the Malaysian delegation.

Malaysia won its first gold medal in Universiade history in wushu sport by Tammy Tan Hui Ling in the Qiangshu event.

== Competitors ==
The following is the list of competitors in the Games.

Sport	Men	Women	Total
Archery	6	6	12
Athletics	14	11	25
Badminton	6	6	12
Diving	0	2	2
Swimming	2	0	2
Shooting	0	3	3
Taekwondo	5	1	6
Wushu	2	2	4
Total	35	31	66

== Medal summary ==
=== Medal by sports ===
Medals by sport
Sport	1st place, gold medalist(s)	2nd place, silver medalist(s)	3rd place, bronze medalist(s)	Total
Badminton	0	0	2	2
Diving	0	1	0	1
Wushu	1	0	3	4
Total	1	1	5	7

=== Medal by date ===
Medals by date
Day	Date	1st place, gold medalist(s)	2nd place, silver medalist(s)	3rd place, bronze medalist(s)	Total
1	28 July	Opening Ceremony			
2	29 July	0	0	1	1
3	30 July	1	0	2	3
4	31 July	0	0	0	0
5	1 August	0	0	0	0
6	2 August	0	0	1	1
7	3 August	0	0	0	0
8	4 August	0	1	0	1
9	5 August	0	0	0	0
10	6 August	0	0	0	0
11	7 August	0	0	1	1
12	8 August	0	0	0	0
Total		1	1	5	7

=== Medalists ===
Medal	Name	Sport	Event	Date
Gold	Tammy Tan Hui Ling	Wushu	Women's Qiangshu	July 30
Silver	Kimberly Bong Qian Ping; Ong Ker Ying	Diving	Women's Synchronised 3m Springboard	August 4
Bronze	Mandy Cebelle Chen	Wushu	Women's Taijiquan	July 29
Bronze	Calvin Lee Wai Leong	Wushu	Men's Nangun	July 30
Bronze	Ang Qi Yue	Wushu	Men's Daoshu	July 30
Bronze	Faris Zaim; Anson Cheong Yan Feng; Liew Xun; Faiz Rozain; Tan Kok Xian; Wong Tien Ci; Gan Jing Err; Ng Qi Xuan; Kisona Selvaduray; Desiree Siow Hao Shan; Teoh Le Xuan; Yap Rui Chen	Badminton	Mixed team	August 2
Bronze	Liew Xun; Wong Tien Ci	Badminton	Men's doubles	August 7

== Archery ==
Individual

Athlete	Event	Ranking round		Round of 48	Round of 24	Round of 16	Round of 8	Quarterfinals	Semifinals	Final / BM	
Athlete	Event	Score	Seed	Opposition Score	Opposition Score	Opposition Score	Opposition Score	Opposition Score	Opposition Score	Opposition Score	Rank
Mohamad Firdaus Mohd Rusmadi	Men's recurve	633	33	Bye	Saiful Islam (MAS); W 6–2	Seo Mingi (KOR); L 0–6	Did not advance				
Muhammad Saiful Islam Mohd Rizuwan	Men's recurve	636	32	Bye	Firdaus Rusmadi (MAS); L 2–6	Did not advance					
Muhammad Farhan Hakim A Rhyme	Men's recurve	601	48	Bye	Chang Yi-chung (TPE); L 3–7	Did not advance					
Eugenius Loh Foh Soon	Men's compound	625	39	—N/a	Yu-quan Lin (TPE); W 143–141	Victor Bouleau (FRA); L 140–146	Did not advance				
Nik Ahmad Danial Mohd Kamarolzaman	Men's compound	666	25	—N/a	Ngai Ho Chun Justin (HKG); L 134–145	Did not advance					
Nabil Thaqif Saharuddin	Men's compound	678	13	—N/a	Bye	Nathan Cadronet (FRA); L 142–143	Did not advance				
Nur Ain Ayuni Fozi	Women's recurve	588	40	—N/a	Sylwia Zyzańska (POL); W 6–4	Zhou Dayan (CHN); L 0–6	Did not advance				
Nuramalia Haneesha Mazlan	Women's recurve	554	45	—N/a	Judith Dabin Gottlieb (USA); L 2–6	Did not advance					
Nur Afisa Abdul Halil	Women's recurve	614	27	—N/a	Mary-Ann Tempelman (NED); W 6–2	Mélanie Gaubil (FRA); L 4–6	Did not advance				
Kayalvhily	Women's compound	592	34	—N/a	Lee Wei Kei Shannon (SGP); L 135–137	Did not advance					
Iman Aisyah Norazam	Women's compound	652	18	—N/a	Bye	Sara Ret (ITA); L 136–138	Did not advance				
Maizatul Amiera Natasha Mahadi	Women's compound	652	20	—N/a	Bye	Elisa Bazzichetto (ITA); L 131–140	Did not advance				

Team

Athlete	Event	Round of 12	Round of 8	Quarterfinals	Semifinals	Final / BM	
Athlete	Event	Opposition Score	Opposition Score	Opposition Score	Opposition Score	Opposition Score	Rank
Muhammad Farhan Hakim A Rhyme; Mohamad Firdaus Mohd Rusmadi; Muhammad Saiful Islam Mohd Rizuwan	Men's recurve	—N/a	France (FRA); W 5–1	Italy (ITA); L 4–5	Did not advance		
Eugenius Loh Foh Soon; Nik Ahmad Danial Mohd Kamarolzaman; Nabil Thaqif Saharuddin	Men's compound	—N/a	Singapore (SGP); W 231–227	South Korea (KOR); L 217–235	Did not advance		
Nur Afisa Abdul Halil; Nur Ain Ayuni Fozi; Nuramalia Haneesha Mazlan	Women's recurve	—N/a	India (IND); L 1–5	Did not advance			
Kayalvhily; Maizatul Amiera Natasha Mahadi; Iman Aisyah Norazam	Women's compound	—N/a	Singapore (SGP); W 222–216	South Korea (KOR); L 234–220	Did not advance		
Muhammad Farhan Hakim A Rhyme; Muhammad Saiful Islam Mohd Rizuwan; Mohamad Firdaus Mohd Rusmadi; Nur Afisa Abdul Halil; Nur Ain Ayuni Fozi; Nuramalia Haneesha Mazlan	Mixed recurve	Mongolia (MGL); L 4–5	Did not advance				
Eugenius Loh Foh Soon; Nik Ahmad Danial Mohd Kamarolzaman; Nabil Thaqif Saharuddin; Kayalvhily; Maizatul Amiera Natasha Mahadi; Iman Aisyah Norazam	Mixed compound	—N/a	United States (USA); L 148–151	Did not advance			

== Athletics ==
=== Track & road events ===
Men

Athlete	Event	Heat		Semifinal		Final	
Athlete	Event	Time	Rank	Time	Rank	Time	Rank
Mohammad Thaqif Mohammad Hisham	100 m	10.84	5	Did not advance			
Muhammad Zulfiqar Ismail	100 m	11.21	6	Did not advance			
Jonathan Nyepa	200 m	21.76	4	Did not advance			
Muhammad Aqil Yasmin	200 m	21.87	4	Did not advance			
Abdul Wafiy Roslan	400 m	DSQ		Did not advance			
Umar Osman	400 m	46.33	2 Q	46.09	3 Q	46.41	7
Wan Muhammad Fazri Wan Zahari	800 m	1:51.88	6	Did not advance			
Mohd Rizzua Haizad Muhamad	110 m hurdles	13.99	4	—N/a		Did not advance	
Ruslem Zikry Putra Roseli	400 m hurdles	52.77	5	—N/a		Did not advance	
Muhammad Zulfiqar Ismail; Mohammad Thaqif Mohammad Hisham; Jonathan Nyepa; Muhammad Aqil Yasmin; Muhammad Yusridzwan Danial Yusof	4 × 100 m relay	40.04	5	—N/a		Did not advance	
Muhammad Firdaus Mohamad Zemi; Mohammad Thaqif Mohammad Hisham; Umar Osman; Ruslem Zikry Putra Roseli; Abdul Wafiy Roslan; Wan Muhammad Fazri Wan Zahari	4 × 400 m relay	3:10.98	3 Q	—N/a		3:10.30	5

Women

Athlete	Event	Heat		Semifinal		Final	
Athlete	Event	Time	Rank	Time	Rank	Time	Rank
Nur Aishah Rofina Aling	100 m	12.20	4	Did not advance			
Chelsea Cassiopea Evali Bopulas	400 m	57.05	7	Did not advance			
Nor Sarah Adi; Azreen Nabila Alias; Nur Aishah Rofina Aling; Nur Afrina Batrisyia Mohamad Rizal; Chelsea Cassiopea Evali Bopulas; Teoh Kim Chyi	4 × 100 m relay	45.66	4	—N/a		Did not advance	
Nur Afrina Batrisyia Mohamad Rizal; Chelsea Cassiopea Evali Bopulas; Mandy Goh Li; Teoh Kim Chyi; Zaimah Atifah Zainuddin	4 × 400 m relay	3:44.55	3 Q	—N/a		3:46.33	6

=== Field events ===
Men

Athlete	Event	Qualification		Final	
Athlete	Event	Distance	Position	Distance	Position
Mohammad Eizlan Dahalan	High jump	2.10	7	Did not advance	
Andre Anura	Long jump	No mark	—N/a	Did not advance	
Andre Anura	Triple jump	15.84	4 q	15.83	8
Sadat Marzuqi Ajisan	Hammer throw	59.00	10	Did not advance	

Women

Athlete	Event	Qualification		Final	
Athlete	Event	Distance	Position	Distance	Position
Nor Sarah Adi	Pole vault	—N/a		No mark	—N/a
Nurul Ashikin Abas	Long jump	5.84	9	Did not advance	
Nurul Ashikin Abas	Triple jump	12.54	9	Did not advance	
Queenie Ting Kung Ni	Discus throw	—N/a		50.56	10
Grace Wong Xiu Mei	Hammer throw	57.70	5 q	57.52	11

== Badminton ==
Singles

Athlete	Event	Round of 64	Round of 32	Round of 16	Quarterfinal	Semifinal	Final	
Athlete	Event	Opposition Score	Opposition Score	Opposition Score	Opposition Score	Opposition Score	Opposition Score	Rank
Anson Cheong	Men's singles	Tristan Oliver Oliveros (PHI); W (21–9, 21–13)	Phang Li Wern (SGP); W (21–9, 21–14)	Lin Chun-yi (TPE); L (12–21, 6–21)	Did not advance			
Faiz Rozain	Men's singles	Patrick Zbinden (SUI); W (21–13, 18–21, 21–11)	Dong Tianyao (CHN); L (11–21, 15–21)	Did not advance				
Kisona Selvaduray	Women's singles	Bye	Moe Aoki (JPN); L W/O	Did not advance				
Yap Rui Chen	Women's singles	Lee Na-rin (KOR); L W/O	Did not advance					

Doubles

Athlete	Event	Round of 64	Round of 32	Round of 16	Quarterfinal	Semifinal	Final	
Athlete	Event	Opposition Score	Opposition Score	Opposition Score	Opposition Score	Opposition Score	Opposition Score	Rank
Faris Zaim / Tan Kok Xian	Men's doubles	Bye	Rei Miyashita / Toma Noda (JPN); L (15–21, 17–21)	Did not advance				
Liew Xun / Wong Tien Ci	Men's doubles	Bye	In Seok-hyun / Na Gwang-min (KOR); W (21–17, 19–21, 21–12)	Rei Miyashita / Toma Noda (JPN); W (21–13, 21–19)	Bjarne Geiss / Jan Colin Volker (GER); W (18–21, 21–17, 21–14)	Ren Xiangyu / Tan Qiang (CHN); L (13–21, 21–19, 14–21)	Did not advance	3rd place, bronze medalist(s)
Ng Qi Xuan / Teoh Le Xuan	Women's doubles	Bye	Tung Ciou-tong / Hsu Wen-chi (TPE); W (21–8, 21–15)	Akari Kurihara / Miu Uchida (JPN); W (18–21, 21–14, 21–18)	Chasinee Korepap / Jhenicha Sudjaipraparat (THA); L (21–19, 9–21, 8^{r}–11)	Did not advance		
Desiree Siow Hao Shan / Yap Rui Chen	Women's doubles	Jacqueline Zhang / Natalie Chi (USA); W W/O	Akanksha Matte / Uthsava Palit (IND); W (21–7, 21–9)	Kalea Sheung / Nicole Ju (USA); W (21–10, 21–12)	Moe Aoki / Machi Nagasako (JPN); L (21–19, 18–21, 12–21)	Did not advance		
Tan Kok Xian / Teoh Le Xuan	Mixed doubles	Bye	Ren Xiangyu / Liu Xuanxuan (CHN); L (9–21, 9–21)	Did not advance				
Wong Tien Ci / Desiree Siow Hao Shan	Mixed doubles	Nicholas Chiu / Jacqueline Zhang (USA); W (21–15, 21–16)	Ko Shing Hei / Leung Yuet Yee (HKG); W (19–21, 21–18, 21–17)	Ruttanapak Oupthong / Jhenicha Sudjaipraparat (THA); L (19–21, 13–21)	Did not advance			
Faris Zaim / Yap Rui Chen	Mixed doubles	Harshit Thakur / Shreya Tiwari (IND); W (21–9, 21–13)	He Jiting / Du Yue (CHN); L (6–21, 12–21)	Did not advance				

Team

Team	Event	Group matches				Quarterfinal	Semifinal	Final	
Team	Event	Opposition Score	Opposition Score	Opposition Score	Rank	Opposition Score	Opposition Score	Opposition Score	Rank
Faris Zaim; Anson Cheong; Liew Xun; Faiz Rozain; Tan Kok Xian; Wong Tien Ci; Gan Jing Err; Ng Qi Xuan; Kisona Selvaduray; Desiree Siow Hao Shan; Teoh Le Xuan; Yap Rui Chen	Mixed team	Singapore; W 5–0	United States; W 4–1	Poland; W 5–0	1 Q	Hong Kong; W 3–1	Chinese Taipei; L 0–3	Did not advance	3rd place, bronze medalist(s)

== Diving ==
Athlete	Event	Preliminaries		Semifinals		Final	
Athlete	Event	Points	Rank	Points	Rank	Points	Rank
Kimberly Bong	Women's 3 m springboard	224.85	14 Q	249.00	6 Q	238.60	10
Kimberly Bong; Ong Ker Ying	Women's 3 m synchro springboard	—N/a				257.82	2nd place, silver medalist(s)

== Shooting ==
Athlete	Event	Qualification		Final	
Athlete	Event	Points	Rank	Points	Rank
Dina Batrisyia Adi Azhar	Women's 10 m air pistol	564	23	Did not advance	
Nurul Syasya Nadiah Mohd Arifin	Women's 10 m air pistol	567	16	Did not advance	
Anis Ayuni Ahmad Khairi	Women's 10 m air pistol	565	20	Did not advance	
Dina Batrisyia Adi Azhar; Anis Ayuni Ahmad Khairi; Nurul Syasya Nadiah Mohd Arifin	Women's team 10 m air pistol	—N/a		1696	5

== Swimming ==
Athlete	Event	Heat		Semifinal		Final	
Athlete	Event	Time	Rank	Time	Rank	Time	Rank
Khiew Hoe Yean	Men's 100 m freestyle	51.05	8	Did not advance			
Khiew Hoe Yean	Men's 200 m freestyle	1:50.18	6 Q	1:49.08	3 Q	1:48.28	4
Khiew Hoe Yean	Men's 400 m freestyle	3:55.17	9	—N/a		Did not advance	
Khiew Hoe Yean	Men's 200 m backstroke	2:04.35	5 Q	2:05.29	7	Did not advance	
Khiew Hoe Yean	Men's 400 m medley	4:33.36	7	—N/a		Did not advance	
Bryan Leong	Men's 50 m freestyle	23.41	8	Did not advance			
Bryan Leong	Men's 50 m breaststroke	29.24	7	Did not advance			
Bryan Leong	Men's 50 m butterfly	24.39	16 Q	24.35	15	Did not advance	
Bryan Leong	Men's 100 m butterfly	53.44	7 Q	53.52	8	Did not advance	

== Taekwondo ==
Poomsae

Athlete	Event	Preliminary		Semifinal		Final	
Athlete	Event	Score	Rank	Score	Rank	Score	Rank
Jason Loo Jun Wei	Men's individual	7.120	2 Q	6.960	10	Did not advance	
Nurul Hidayah Abdul Karim	Women's individual	6.830	4 Q	6.830	3 Q	5.730	6
Jason Loo Jun Wei; Nurul Hidayah Abdul Karim	Mixed pair	6.940	1 Q	6.560	10	Did not advance	

Kyorugi

Athlete	Event	Round of 32	Round of 16	Quarterfinals	Semifinals	Final	
Athlete	Event	Opposition Result	Opposition Result	Opposition Result	Opposition Result	Opposition Result	Rank
Ahmad Nor Iman Hakim Rakib	Men's −68 kg	Lo Wai-fung (HKG); W 2–1	Mateusz Szczesnowski (POL); W 0–0 (WDR)	Chenming Xiao (CHN); L 0–2	Did not advance		
Joshua Amirul Abdullah	Men's −74 kg	Bye	Tsagaantsooj Bayanbat (MGL); L 1–2 (WDR)	Did not advance			
Muhammad Syafiq Zuber	Men's −80 kg	Kwan I-pin (SGP); W 2–0	Huseyin Kartal (TUR); L 0–2	Did not advance			
Muhammad Luqman Haqim Mohd Suhaimi	Men's −87 kg	Bye	Adrian Wojtkowiak (POL); L 0–2 (WDR)	Did not advance			
Joshua Amirul Abdullah; Muhammad Luqman Haqim Mohd Suhaimi; Ahmad Nor Iman Hakim Rakib; Muhammad Syafiq Zuber	Men's team	—N/a	Chinese Taipei (TPE); L 0–1	Did not advance			

== Wushu ==
Taolu

Athlete	Event	Final	
Athlete	Event	Score	Rank
Ang Qi Yue	Men's Changquan	9.523	7
Ang Qi Yue	Men's Daoshu	9.660	3rd place, bronze medalist(s)
Calvin Lee Wai Leong	Men's Nanquan	9.333	6
Calvin Lee Wai Leong	Men's Nangun	9.653	3rd place, bronze medalist(s)
Tammy Tan Hui Ling	Women's Jianshu	9.623	4
Tammy Tan Hui Ling	Women's Qiangshu	9.613	1st place, gold medalist(s)
Mandy Cebelle Chen	Women's Taijiquan	9.633	3rd place, bronze medalist(s)
Mandy Cebelle Chen	Women's Taijijian	9.640	5
