= Macau at the 2021 Summer World University Games =

- Flag of Macau
- IOC code: MAC

in Chengdu, China 28 July 2023 – 8 August 2023
- Competitors: 52 (30 men and 22 women)
- Medals Ranked 25th: Gold 1 Silver 3 Bronze 3 Total 7

Summer World University Games appearances
- 1959; 1961; 1963; 1965; 1967; 1970; 1973; 1975; 1977; 1979; 1981; 1983; 1985; 1987; 1989; 1991; 1993; 1995; 1997; 1999; 2001; 2003; 2005; 2007; 2009; 2011; 2013; 2015; 2017; 2019; 2021; 2025; 2027

Macau competed at the 2021 Summer World University Games in Chengdu, China held from 28 July to 8 August 2023.

== Medal summary ==
=== Medal by sports ===
Rank	Sports	Gold	Silver	Bronze	Total
1	Wushu	1	3	3	7
Totals (1 entries)		1	3	3	7

=== Medalists ===
Medal	Name	Sport	Event	Day
Gold	Wong Sam In	Wushu	Women's nanquan	30 July
Silver	Cheung Ioi Chit	Wushu	Men's nangun	30 July
Silver	Wong Weng Ian	Wushu	Women's jianshu	30 July
Silver	Wong Weng Ian	Wushu	Women's qiangshu	30 July
Bronze	Wong Sam In	Wushu	Women's Nandao	29 July
Bronze	Lei Cheok Ieong	Wushu	Men's gunshu	30 July
Bronze	Cai Fei Long	Wushu	Men's 80 kg	3 August
