= Wong Weng Ian =

Macau wushu practitioner (born 2004)

Personal information
- Born: 27 April 2004 (age 22)

Sport
- Sport: Wushu
- Events: Changquan, Jianshu, Qiangshu
- Team: Macau Wushu Team
Medal record
Representing Macau
Women's Wushu Taolu
World Cup
Gold medal – first place	2024 Yokohama	Duilian
Bronze medal – third place	2024 Yokohama	Qiangshu
World Championships
Bronze medal – third place	2023 Fort Worth	Duilian
Bronze medal – third place	2025 Brasília	Jianshu
World University Games
Silver medal – second place	2021 Chengdu	Jianshu
Silver medal – second place	2021 Chengdu	Qiangshu
Asian Championships
Bronze medal – third place	2024 Macau	Qiangshu
World Junior Championships
Gold medal – first place	2022 Tangerang	Qiangshu A
Bronze medal – third place	2018 Brasília	Qiangshu B
Bronze medal – third place	2022 Tangerang	Changquan A
Bronze medal – third place	2022 Tangerang	Jianshu A
Bronze medal – third place	2022 Tangerang	Duilian A

Wong Weng Ian (Chinese: 王泳欣; pinyin: Wángyǒngxīn; born 27 April 2004) is a professional wushu taolu athlete from Macau.

== Career ==
Wong made her international junior debut at the 2018 World Junior Wushu Championships and won a bronze medal in qiangshu. At the 2022 championships, she became the world junior champion in qiangshu and a triple bronze medalist in her other events.

At the delayed 2021 Summer World University Games, Wong won the silver medal in the jianshu and qiangshu event. A few months later, she won the bronze medal in duilian (alongside Sou Cho Man) at the 2023 World Wushu Championships. Several months later, she won the bronze medal in qiangshu at the 2024 Asian Wushu Championships. She then won the bronze medal in qiangshu and gold medal in duilian at the 2024 Taolu World Cup. A year later at the 2025 World Wushu Championships, she won the bronze medal in jianshu.
