= Tammy Tan Hui Ling =

Malaysian wushu practitioner

Personal information
- Born: July 27, 2001 (age 24) Malacca, Malaysia
- Height: 1.57 m (5 ft 2 in)
- Weight: 53 kg (117 lb)

Sport
- Sport: Wushu
- Team: Malaysia Wushu Team
Medal record
Representing Malaysia
Women's Wushu Taolu
World University Games
| Gold medal – first place | 2021 Chengdu | Qiangshu |
ASEAN University Games
| Gold medal – first place | 2022 Ubon Ratchathani | Jianshu |
| Gold medal – first place | 2022 Ubon Ratchathani | Dulian |
| Bronze medal – third place | 2022 Ubon Ratchathani | Qiangshu |

Tammy Tan Hui Ling (born July 27, 2001) is a wushu taolu athlete from Malaysia. She won a gold medal at 2021 Summer World University Games in the qiangshu event which was also first gold medal for Malaysia in the World University Games.
