= Iran at the 2021 Summer World University Games =

- Flag of Iran
- IOC code: IRI

in Chengdu, China 28 July 2023 – 8 August 2023
- Competitors: 85 (57 men and 28 women)
- Flag bearer: Najmeh Khedmati And Mirhashem Hosseini
- Medals Ranked 11th: Gold 5 Silver 6 Bronze 12 Total 23

Summer World University Games appearances
- 1973; 1975; 1977; 1979–2001; 2003; 2005; 2007; 2009; 2011; 2013; 2015; 2017; 2019; 2021; 2025; 2027

Iran competed at the 2021 Summer World University Games in Chengdu, China held from 28 July to 8 August 2023.

== Medal summary ==
=== Medal by sports ===
Rank	Sports	Gold	Silver	Bronze	Total
1	Taekwondo	4	3	6	13
2	Wushu	1	2	3	6
3	Rowing	0	1	0	1
4	Shooting	0	0	2	2
5	Archery	0	0	1	1
Totals (5 entries)		5	6	12	23

=== Medalists ===
Medal	Name	Sport	Event	Day
Gold	Mohammad Hosseini	Wushu	Men's gunshu	30 July
Gold	Mehdi Haji Mousaei	Taekwondo	Men's 54 kg	31 July
Gold	Alireza Hosseinpour	Taekwondo	Men's 58 kg	1 August
Gold	Mirhashem Hosseini	Taekwondo	Men's 74 kg	2 August
Gold	Nahid Kiani	Taekwondo	Women's 53 kg	3 August
Silver	Anahita Tavakkoli	Taekwondo	Women's +73 kg	2 August
Silver	Arian Salimi	Taekwondo	Men's 87 kg	3 August
Silver	Hamidreza Sahandi	Wushu	Men's sanda	3 August
Silver	Ali Khorshidi	Wushu	Men's sanda	3 August
Silver	Mehran Barkhordari; Mirhashem Hosseini; Alireza Hosseinpour; Arian Salimi	Taekwondo	Men's team kyorugi	4 August
Silver	Amirhossein Mahmoudpour	Rowing	Lightweight men's single sculls	6 August
Bronze	Laya Mohammadi; Hanieh Rostamian; Fatemeh Shekari	Shooting	Women's 10 m air pistol team	29 July
Bronze	Shahin Banitalebi	Wushu	Men's nanguan	29 July
Bronze	Morteza Zendehdel	Taekwondo	Men's individual poomsae	29 July
Bronze	Yasaman Limouchi	Taekwondo	Women's individual poomsae	29 July
Bronze	Yasaman Limouchi; Reihaneh Omrani; Mobina Sharifi	Taekwondo	Women's team poomsae	30 July
Bronze	Reza Jalalifar; Ali Mousania; Morteza Zendehdel	Taekwondo	Men's team poomsae	30 July
Bronze	Reza Shabani	Archery	Men's individual recurve	31 July
Bronze	Mehran Barkhordari	Taekwondo	Men's 80 kg	1 August
Bronze	Laya Mohammadi; Hanieh Rostamian; Amitis Jafari	Shooting	Women's 25 m pistol team	1 August
Bronze	Mohana Rahimi	Wushu	Women's sanda	1 August
Bronze	Narges Mirnourollahi	Taekwondo	Women's 62 kg	2 August
Bronze	Shojae Panahi	Wushu	men's sanda	2 August
