= Fencing at the 2021 Summer World University Games =

Fencing at the Chengdu 2021 FISU World University Games
- Venue: Pidu Sports Centre Gymnasium
- Dates: 2–7 August

Fencing was contested at the 2021 Summer World University Games from 2 to 7 July 2023 at Pidu Sports Centre, Chengdu.

== Medal summary ==
=== Medal table ===
* Host nation (China)

Rank	Nation	Gold	Silver	Bronze	Total
1	France	3	2	4	9
2	China*	3	1	2	6
3	Hong Kong	3	0	1	4
4	Italy	2	4	2	8
5	South Korea	1	2	1	4
6	Hungary	0	1	1	2
6	United States	0	1	1	2
8	Ukraine	0	1	0	1
9	Japan	0	0	3	3
10	Kazakhstan	0	0	1	1
10	Poland	0	0	1	1
10	Uzbekistan	0	0	1	1
Totals (12 entries)		12	12	18	42

=== Men's events ===
Event	Gold	Silver	Bronze
Individual épée	Kendrick Jean-Joseph; France	Yan Sych; Ukraine	Xiu Yuhan; China
Individual épée	Kendrick Jean-Joseph; France	Yan Sych; Ukraine	Luidgi Midelton; France
Individual sabre	Park Sang-won; South Korea	Gergő Horváth; Hungary	Samuel Jarry; France
Individual sabre	Park Sang-won; South Korea	Gergő Horváth; Hungary	Tamon Yoshida; Japan
Individual foil	Cheung Ka Long; Hong Kong	Pierre Loisel; France	Jan Jurkiewicz; Poland
Individual foil	Cheung Ka Long; Hong Kong	Pierre Loisel; France	Ryan Choi; Hong Kong
Team épée	France; Tyvan Bibard; Aymerick Gally; Kendrick Jean-Joseph; Luidgi Midelton	China; Lan Minghao; Wang Zijie; Xiu Yuhan; Yu Lefan	Italy; Filippo Armaleo; Giulio Gaetani; Simone Mencarelli; Giacomo Paolini
Team sabre	Italy; Alberto Arpino; Dario Cavaliere; Leonardo Dreossi; Giacomo Mignuzzi	South Korea; Do Gyeong-dong; Hwang Hyun-ho; Park Sang-won; Sung Hyeon-mo	Kazakhstan; Zhanat Nabiyev; Artyom Sarkissyan; Nazarbay Sattarkhan
Team foil	Hong Kong; Cheung Ka Long; Ryan Choi; Lee Yat Long Aaron; Lawrence Ng	France; Tyvan Bibard; Maximilien Chastanet; Pierre Loisel; Alexandre Sido	Italy; Davide Filippi; Francesco Ingargiola; Giulio Lombardi; Tommaso Martini

=== Women's events ===
Event	Gold	Silver	Bronze
Individual épée	Kaylin Hsieh; Hong Kong	Sara Maria Kowalczyk; Italy	Catherine Nixon; United States
Individual épée	Kaylin Hsieh; Hong Kong	Sara Maria Kowalczyk; Italy	Tamaki Terayama; Japan
Individual sabre	Chao Yaqi; China	Choi Ji-young; South Korea	Malina Vongsavady; France
Individual sabre	Chao Yaqi; China	Choi Ji-young; South Korea	Sarah Noutcha; France
Individual foil	Serena Rossini; Italy	Elena Tangherlini; Italy	Chen Qingyuan; China
Individual foil	Serena Rossini; Italy	Elena Tangherlini; Italy	Sim So-eun; South Korea
Team épée	China; Li Shanshan; Shi Yuexin; Tang Junyao; Xu Nuo	Italy; Alessandra Bozza; Sara Maria Kowalczyk; Roberta Marzani; Gaia Traditi	Hungary; Jázmin Tóth; Eszter Muhari; Edina Kardos; Tamara Gnám
Team sabre	France; Sarah Noutcha; Anne Poupinet; Cyrielle Rioux; Malina Vongsavady	United States; Alexis Anglade; Chloe Fox-Gitomer; Tatiana Nazlymov; Kaitlyn Pak	Uzbekistan; Zaynab Dayibekova; Gulistan Perdebaeva; Aysuliu Usnatdinova
Team foil	China; Chen Qingyuan; Fu Yiting; Huang Qianqian	Italy; Giulia Amore; Anna Cristino; Serena Rossini; Elena Tangherlini	Japan; Reina Iwamoto; Arisa Kano; Haruka Umetsu

== Nations ==
403 fencers from 45 nations:

- Men's individual sabre had ? fencers in ? pools; ? fencers would qualify to tables. Women's individual épée had ? fencers in ? pools; ? fencers would qualify to tables.
- Men's individual épee had ? fencers in ? pools; ? fencers would qualify to tables. Women's individual foil had ? fencers in ? pools; ? fencers would qualify to tables.
- Men's individual foil had 68 fencers in 10 pools; 50 fencers would qualify to tables. Women's individual sabre had 45 fencers in 7 pools; 34 fencers would qualify to tables.
