= Kazakhstan at the 2021 Summer World University Games =

- Flag of Kazakhstan
- IOC code: KAZ

in Chengdu, China 28 July 2023 – 8 August 2023
- Competitors: 93 (53 men and 40 women)
- Medals Ranked 20th: Gold 2 Silver 7 Bronze 11 Total 20

Summer World University Games appearances
- 1959; 1961; 1963; 1965; 1967; 1970; 1973; 1975; 1977; 1979; 1981; 1983; 1985; 1987; 1989; 1991; 1993; 1995; 1997; 1999; 2001; 2003; 2005; 2007; 2009; 2011; 2013; 2015; 2017; 2019; 2021; 2025; 2027

Kazakhstan competed at the 2021 Summer World University Games in Chengdu, China held from 28 July to 8 August 2023.

== Medal summary ==
=== Medal by sports ===
Rank	Sports	Gold	Silver	Bronze	Total
1	Artistic gymnastics	1	2	1	4
2	Taekwondo	1	0	1	2
3	Rhythmic gymnastics	0	2	1	3
3	Shooting	0	2	1	3
5	Archery	0	1	0	1
6	Judo	0	0	3	3
7	Wushu	0	0	2	2
8	Fencing	0	0	1	1
8	Swimming	0	0	1	1
Totals (9 entries)		2	7	11	20

=== Medalists ===
Medal	Name	Sport	Event	Day
Gold	Rita Bakisheva	Taekwondo	Women's 46 kg	31 July
Gold	Milad Karimi	Artistic gymnastics	Men's horizontal bar	5 August
Silver	Nikita Chiryukin	Shooting	Men's 25 metre rapid fire pistol	30 July
Silver	Konstantin Malinovskiy; Islam Satpayev; Nikita Shakhtorin	Shooting	Men's team 50 metre rifle three positions	30 July
Silver	Diana Tursunbek	Archery	Women's individual recurve	31 July
Silver	Elzhana Taniyeva	Rhythmic gymnastics	Women's individual ball	31 July
Silver	Elzhana Taniyeva	Rhythmic gymnastics	Women's individual ribbon	31 July
Silver	Milad Karimi	Artistic gymnastics	Men's floor	5 August
Silver	Nariman Kurbanov	Artistic gymnastics	Men's pommel horse	5 August
Bronze	Sunggat Zhubatkan	Judo	Men's 66 kg	29 July
Bronze	Askar Narkulov	Judo	Men's 73 kg	30 July
Bronze	Konstantin Malinovskiy; Islam Satpayev; Nikita Shakhtorin	Shooting	Men's team 10 metre air rifle	31 July
Bronze	Bekarys Saduakas	Judo	Men's 100 kg	31 July
Bronze	Elzhana Taniyeva	Rhythmic gymnastics	Women's individual hoop	31 July
Bronze	Bexultan Koskenov	Wushu	Men's 60 kg	3 August
Bronze	Aigerim Torekhanova	Wushu	Women's 60 kg	3 August
Bronze	Abdurakhmon Maripov; Beibarys Kablan; Bexultan Mussakhan; Shamsat Duisenov	Taekwondo	Men's team kyorugi	4 August
Bronze	Milad Karimi	Artistic gymnastics	Men's vault	5 August
Bronze	Zhanat Nabiyev; Artyom Sarkissyan; Nazarbay Sattarkhan	Fencing	Men's team sabre	5 August
Bronze	Adilbek Mussin	Swimming	Men's 100 metre butterfly	6 August
