= Netherlands at the 2021 Summer World University Games =

- Flag of the Netherlands
- IOC code: NED

in Chengdu, China 28 July 2023 – 8 August 2023
- Competitors: 63 (34 men and 29 women)
- Medals Ranked 22nd: Gold 2 Silver 3 Bronze 4 Total 9

Summer World University Games appearances
- 1959; 1961; 1963; 1965; 1967; 1970; 1973; 1975; 1977; 1979; 1981; 1983; 1985; 1987; 1989; 1991; 1993; 1995; 1997; 1999; 2001; 2003; 2005; 2007; 2009; 2011; 2013; 2015; 2017; 2019; 2021; 2025; 2027

Netherlands competed at the 2021 Summer World University Games in Chengdu, China held from 28 July to 8 August 2023.

== Medal summary ==
=== Medal by sports ===
Rank	Sports	Gold	Silver	Bronze	Total
1	Rowing	2	2	1	5
2	Judo	0	1	2	3
3	Athletics	0	0	1	1
Totals (3 entries)		2	3	4	9

=== Medalists ===
Medal	Name	Sport	Event	Day
Gold	Robert Tiemeijer; Vosse Meijssen; Wessel Hesselink; Kevin-Lee Bieshaar; Sander Hazelaar; Martijn Bos; Mats van Sabben; Dolf Rutten; Aniek van Veenen	Rowing	Men's eight	6 August
Gold	Pieter van Veen; Eli Brouwer	Rowing	Men's pair	6 August
Silver	Amber Gersjes	Judo	Women's 48 kg	29 July
Silver	Anna Leerink; Annelouk van Mierlo; Marije Ijpma; Wia Ruiter; Nienke von Hebel; Lisanne van der Lelij; Maartje Damen; Floor van Ameijde; Ashraf Morra	Rowing	Women's eight	6 August
Silver	Sanne Muggen; Wia Ruiter	Rowing	Women's pair	6 August
Bronze	Nadiah Krachten	Judo	Women's 63 kg	30 July
Bronze	Mark van Dijk	Judo	Men's 90 kg	31 July
Bronze	Koen van der Wijst	Athletics	Men's pole vault	5 August
Bronze	Anna Leerink; Annelouk van Mierlo; Nienke von Hebel; Floor van Ameijde	Rowing	Women's four	6 August
