= South Korea at the 2021 Summer World University Games =

- Flag of South Korea
- IOC code: KOR

in Chengdu, China 28 July 2023 – 8 August 2023
- Medals Ranked 3rd: Gold 17 Silver 18 Bronze 23 Total 58

Summer World University Games appearances
- 1959; 1961; 1963; 1965; 1967; 1970; 1973; 1975; 1977; 1979; 1981; 1983; 1985; 1987; 1989; 1991; 1993; 1995; 1997; 1999; 2001; 2003; 2005; 2007; 2009; 2011; 2013; 2015; 2017; 2019; 2021; 2025; 2027

South Korea competed at the 2021 Summer World University Games in Chengdu, China held from 28 July to 8 August 2023.

== Medal summary ==
=== Medal by sports ===
Rank	Sports	Gold	Silver	Bronze	Total
1	Taekwondo	7	1	5	13
2	Archery	4	3	1	8
3	Shooting	3	2	2	7
4	Judo	2	4	4	10
5	Fencing	1	2	1	4
6	Diving	0	4	4	8
7	Badminton	0	1	1	2
7	Wushu	0	1	1	2
9	Artistic gymnastics	0	0	2	2
10	Swimming	0	0	1	1
10	Tennis	0	0	1	1
Totals (11 entries)		17	18	23	58

=== Medalists ===
Medal	Name	Sport	Event	Day
Gold	Choi Eun-jeong; Yoo Seon-hwa; Kim Ji-eun	Shooting	Women's team 10 metre air rifle	29 July
Gold	Huh Mi-mi	Judo	Women's -57 kg	29 July
Gold	Kang Wan-jin	Taekwondo	Men's individual poomsae	29 July
Gold	Cha Yea-eun	Taekwondo	Women's individual poomsae	29 July
Gold	Cho Su-a; Sim Soo-in; Han Seung-yeon	Archery	Women's team compound	30 July
Gold	Choi Doo-hee; Kim Pil-joong; Seo Min-gi	Archery	Men's team recurve	30 July
Gold	Shin Woo-seop; Lee Jae-won; Gwon Min-seok	Taekwondo	Men's team poomsae	30 July
Gold	Jung Ha-eun; Yun Ji-hye; Song Kyeong-seon	Taekwondo	Women's team poomsae	30 July
Gold	Choi Mi-sun	Archery	Women's individual recurve	31 July
Gold	Seo Min-gi	Archery	Men's individual recurve	31 July
Gold	Kim Min-jong	Judo	Men's +100 kg	31 July
Gold	Kim Yu-jin	Taekwondo	Women's 57 kg	31 July
Gold	Lee Sang-ryeol	Taekwondo	Men's 68 kg	31 July
Gold	Yang Ji-in	Shooting	Women's 25 metre pistol	1 August
Gold	Lim Ho-jin; Choe Bo-ram; Lee Won-ho	Shooting	Men's team 10 metre air pistol	1 August
Gold	Park Sang-won	Fencing	Men's individual sabre	2 August
Gold	Seo Geon-woo; Lee Sang-ryeol; Ryoo Jin; Lee Kyeong-hak	Taekwondo	Men's team kyorugi	4 August
Silver	Jang Se-yun	Judo	Women's -52 kg	29 July
Silver	Je Ga-yeong	Wushu	Women's nandao	29 July
Silver	Cho Su-a; Park Seung-hyun	Archery	Mixed team compound	30 July
Silver	Lee Ga-hyun; Kim So-hee; Choi Mi-sun	Archery	Women's team recurve	30 July
Silver	Seo Min-gi; Lee Ga-hyun	Archery	Mixed team recurve	30 July
Silver	Kim Gyeong-gyu; Son Min-seon	Taekwondo	Mixed team poomsae	30 July
Silver	Ko Hyeon-ju; Kim Seo-yeon	Diving	Women's synchronized 10 metre platform	31 July
Silver	Lee Yun-seon	Judo	Women's -78 kg	31 July
Silver	Han Ju-yeop	Judo	Men's -90 kg	31 July
Silver	Park Saet-byeol	Judo	Women's +78 kg	31 July
Silver	Lim Ho-jin	Shooting	Men's 10 metre air pistol	1 August
Silver	Sim Eun-ji; Yang Ji-in; Kim Min-seo	Shooting	Women's team 25 metre pistol	1 August
Silver	Choi Ji-young	Fencing	Women's individual sabre	4 August
Silver	Kim Yeong-nam	Diving	Men's 1 metre springboard	5 August
Silver	Do Gyeong-dong; Hwang Hyun-ho; Park Sang-won; Sung Hyeon-mo	Fencing	Men's team sabre	5 August
Silver	Jung Da-yeon; Kim Na-hyun; Kim Seo-yeon; Ko Hyeon-ju; Kwon Ha-lim	Diving	Women's team	7 August
Silver	Joung Dong-min; Kang Min-hyuk; Kim Seo-kyoung; Kim Yeong-nam; Shin Jung-whi	Diving	Men's team	7 August
Silver	Kim Ga-ram	Badminton	Women's singles	7 August
Bronze	Oh Yeon-ju	Judo	Women's -48 kg	29 July
Bronze	Jeon Seung-beom	Judo	Men's -60 kg	29 July
Bronze	Lee Gun-hyeok; Lee Seung-hoon; Youn Jae-yeon	Shooting	Men's team 25 metre rapid fire pistol	30 July
Bronze	Cho Su-a	Archery	Women's individual compound	31 July
Bronze	Nam Yong-hyuk	Taekwondo	Men's 54 kg	31 July
Bronze	Han Hee-ju; Huh Mi-mi; Jang Se-yun; Lee Yun-seon; Oh Yeon-ju; Park Saet-byeol; Shin Chae-won	Judo	Women's team	1 August
Bronze	An Jae-hong; Han Ju-yeop; Jeon Seung-beom; Kim Min-jong; Kim Se-heon; Lee Eun-kyul; Lee Joon-hwan	Judo	Men's team	1 August
Bronze	Park Chan	Taekwondo	Men's 58 kg	1 August
Bronze	Seo Geon-woo	Taekwondo	Men's 80 kg	1 August
Bronze	Jang Ji-in; Lee Won-ho	Shooting	Mixed team 10 metre air pistol	2 August
Bronze	Joung Dong-min	Diving	Men's 3 metre springboard	2 August
Bronze	Ryu Sung-hyun; Kan Hyun-bae; Kim Jae-ho; Seo Jung-won; Lee Jung-hyo	Artistic gymnastics	Men's team all-around	2 August
Bronze	Sim So-eun	Fencing	Women's individual foil	3 August
Bronze	Lee Kyeong-hak	Taekwondo	Men's 87 kg	3 August
Bronze	Song Gi-cheol	Wushu	Men's 70 kg	3 August
Bronze	Kim Na-hyun; Shin Jung-whi	Diving	Mixed synchronized 10 metre platform	4 August
Bronze	Jang Eun-ji; Kim Yu-jin; Jo Hee-kyeong; Lim Geum-byeol	Taekwondo	Women's team kyorugi	4 August
Bronze	Ryu Sung-hyun	Artistic gymnastics	Men's floor	5 August
Bronze	Jang Yun-seok	Tennis	Men's singles	6 August
Bronze	Kim Seong-ju	Swimming	Men's 200 metre backstroke	6 August
Bronze	Shin Jung-whi	Diving	Men's 10 metre platform	7 August
Bronze	Shin Jung-whi; Kim Na-hyun	Diving	Mixed team	7 August
Bronze	Jin Yong; Ji Young-bin	Badminton	Mixed doubles	7 August
