= Azerbaijan at the 2021 Summer World University Games =

- Flag of Azerbaijan
- IOC code: AZE

in Chengdu, China 28 July 2023 – 8 August 2023
- Competitors: 86 (66 men and 20 women)
- Medals Ranked 38th: Gold 0 Silver 3 Bronze 6 Total 9

Summer World University Games appearances
- 1995; 1997; 1999; 2001; 2003; 2005; 2007; 2009; 2011; 2013; 2015; 2017; 2019; 2021; 2025; 2027

Azerbaijan competed at the 2021 Summer World University Games in Chengdu, China, held from 28 July to 8 August 2023.

== Medal summary ==
=== Medal by sports ===
| Rank | Sports | Gold | Silver | Bronze | Total |
|---|---|---|---|---|---|
| 1 | Rhythmic gymnastics | 0 | 2 | 1 | 3 |
| 2 | Judo | 0 | 1 | 3 | 4 |
| 3 | Rowing | 0 | 0 | 1 | 1 |
| 3 | Taekwondo | 0 | 0 | 1 | 1 |
| Totals (4 entries) | | 0 | 3 | 6 | 9 |

=== Medalists ===
| Medal | Name | Sport | Event | Day |
|---|---|---|---|---|
| Silver | Rashid Mammadaliyev | Judo | Men's -73 kg | 30 July |
| Silver | Zohra Aghamirova | Rhythmic gymnastics | Women's individual hoop | 31 July |
| Silver | Zohra Aghamirova | Rhythmic gymnastics | Women's individual clubs | 31 July |
| Bronze | Yashar Najafov | Judo | Men's -66 kg | 29 July |
| Bronze | Leyla Aliyeva | Judo | Women's -48 kg | 29 July |
| Bronze | Zohra Aghamirova | Rhythmic gymnastics | Women's individual ribbon | 31 July |
| Bronze | Minaya Akbarova | Taekwondo | Women's -46 kg | 31 July |
| Bronze | Eljan Hajiyev; Magerram Imamverdiev; Kanan Ismayilov; Rashid Mammadaliyev; Ruslan Nasirli; Toghrul Salmanov | Judo | Men's team | 1 August |
| Bronze | Bahman Nasiri | Rowing | Men's single sculls | 6 August |
