= 2021 Summer World University Games =

2023 multi-sport event in Chengdu, China

2021 FISU Summer World University Games 2021年夏季世界大学生运动会
- Host city: Chengdu, Sichuan, China
- Motto: Chengdu Makes Dreams Come True (Chinese: 成都成就梦想)
- Nations: 116
- Athletes: 5059
- Sport: 18
- Events: 269
- Opening: 28 July 2023
- Closing: 8 August 2023
- Opened by: Xi Jinping, CCP General Secretary and President of China
- Athlete's Oath: Tang Ziting
- Judge's Oath: Liu Jiang
- Torch lighter: Ye Guangfu and 30 other university sport athletes (representing each edition held before)
- Main venue: Dong'an Lake Sports Center (opening ceremony); Chengdu Open Air Music Park (closing ceremony)
- Website: 2021chengdu.com (archived)

The 2021 Summer World University Games (2021年夏季世界大学生运动会), also known as Chengdu 2021, was a multi-sport event sanctioned by the International University Sports Federation (FISU), held from 28 July to 8 August 2023 in Chengdu, Sichuan, China. It was the fourth time the Games was hosted in China. (Note: The 2001 Summer Universiade was held in Beijing, the 2009 Winter Universiade was held in Harbin, and the 2011 Summer Universiade was held in Shenzhen.) This is the first time the Games was referred to as the "Summer World University Games" rather than the "Summer Universiade."

The Games were originally scheduled to be held between 16 and 27 August 2021. On 2 April 2021, it was announced that the Games would be postponed to 2022 due to the COVID-19 pandemic and the postponement of the 2020 Summer Olympics to 2021 for the same reason. In May 2021, FISU rescheduled the event to 26 June – 7 July 2022. On 6 May 2022, FISU postponed the event again to 2023 due to COVID-19 concerns; the Games effectively replaced the 2023 Summer World University Games in Yekaterinburg, whose hosting rights had been stripped due to the Russian invasion of Ukraine; they would still be referred to as the 2021 Games for branding and marketing purposes.

The games marked the 15th anniversary of the 2008 Summer Olympics in Beijing, China.

== Host selection ==
On 1 September 2014, FISU opened bids for both the 2021 Winter and Summer Universiades. Bucharest, Romania and Santiago de Cali, Colombia announced intents to submit bids for the Summer Universiade. Also, a proposal was made by Ashgabat, Turkmenistan who hosted the 2017 Asian Indoor and Martial Arts Games venues, but the city declined due to the size of the event. On 14 October 2018, it was reported that the FISU had proposed a joint bid between Seoul, South Korea and Pyongyang, North Korea during a meeting between Mayor of Seoul Park Won-soon and the FISU's secretary-general Eric Saintrond.

On 13 December 2018, it was reported that representatives from China signed a "pre-attribution contract" with the FISU members at a meeting of its steering committee in Braga, Portugal and they proposed that the Games could be held in Chengdu. On 1 March 2019, prior to the Winter Universiade opening ceremonies in Krasnoyarsk, Russia Chengdu was officially announced as the host of the 2021 Summer Universiade.

== Venues ==
The following venues hosted events during the 2021 Summer World University Games:

Dong'an Lake Sports Center

- Dong'an Lake Stadium – Opening ceremony
- Dong'an Lake Arena – Gymnastics (Artistic)
- Dong'an Lake Sports Park Aquatics Centre – Swimming and Water Polo (finals)
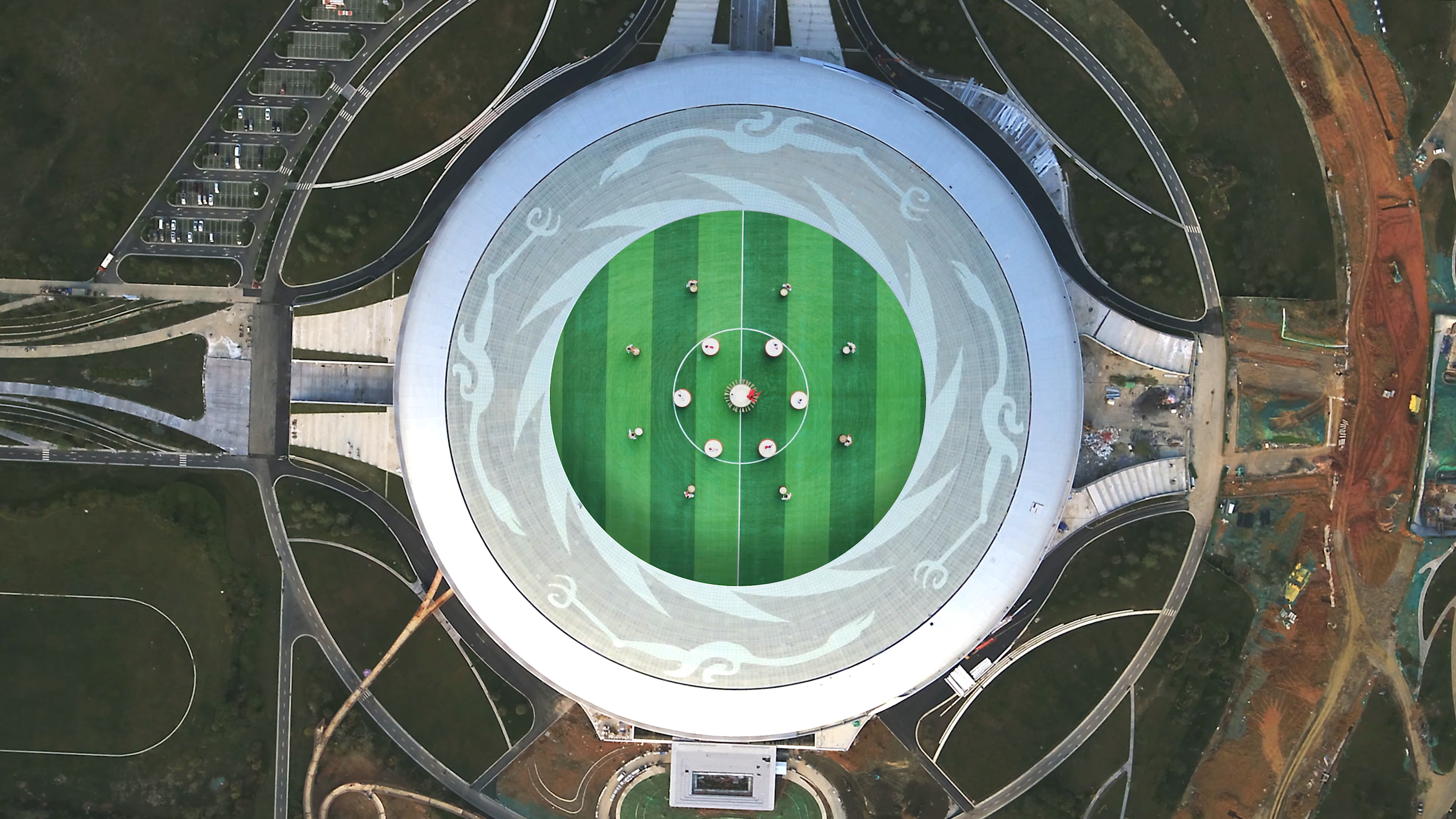
  Dong'an Lake Stadium
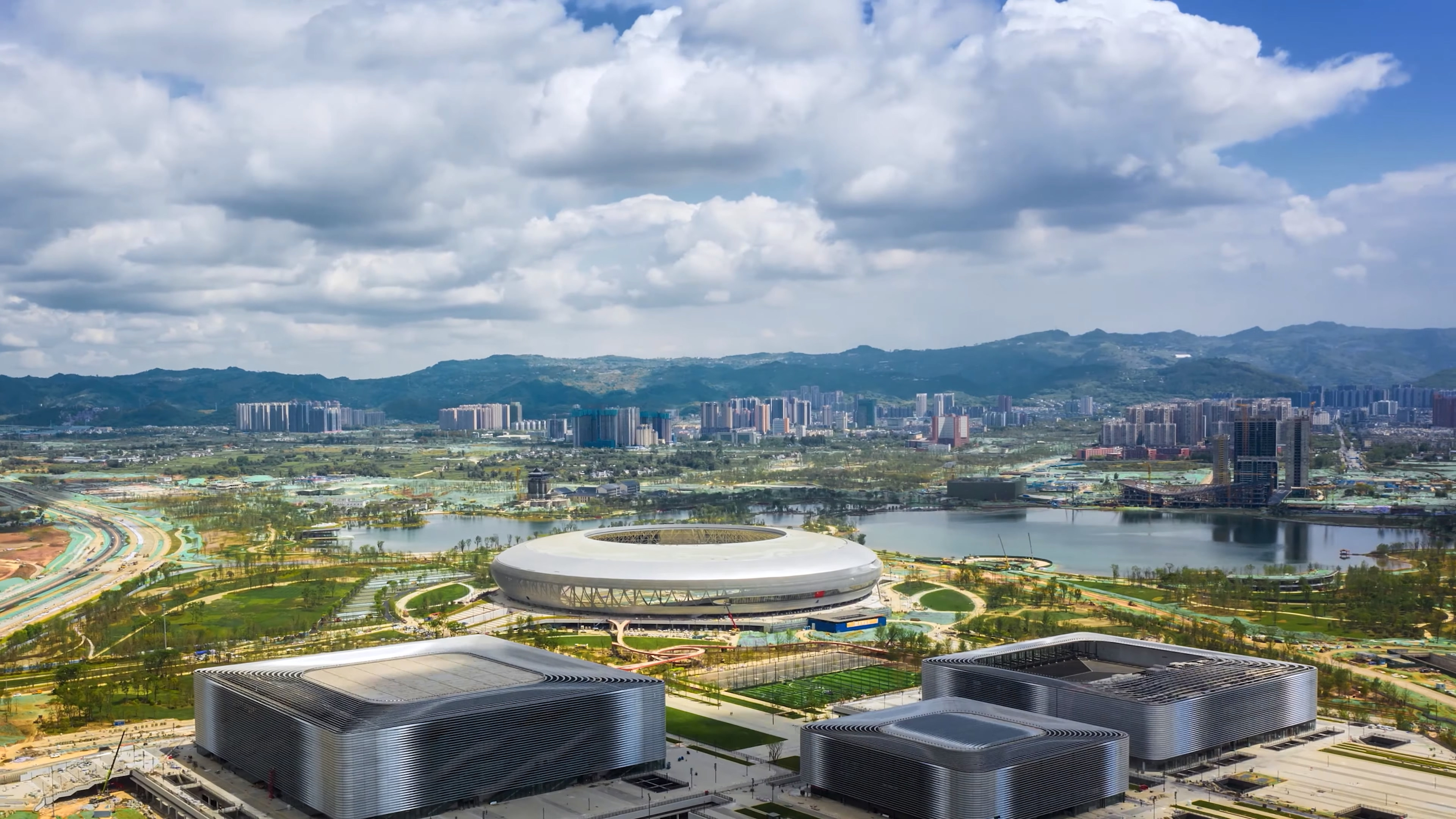
  Dong'an Lake Sports Complex

Shuangliu District

- Shuangliu Modern Pentathlon Centre – Archery and Water polo (preliminaries and finals)
- Shuangliu Sports Centre Stadium – Athletics
- Shuangliu Sports Centre Gymnasium – Badminton
- Sichuan International Tennis Centre – Tennis

Xindu District

- Xindu Xiangcheng Sports Centre Natatorium – Water polo (preliminaries and finals)

Wuhou District

- Sichuan Provincial Gymnasium – Basketball
- Sichuan University Gymnasium – Basketball

Jinniu District

- Phoenix Hill Sports Park Arena – Basketball (finals)
- Chengbei Gymnasium – Wushu
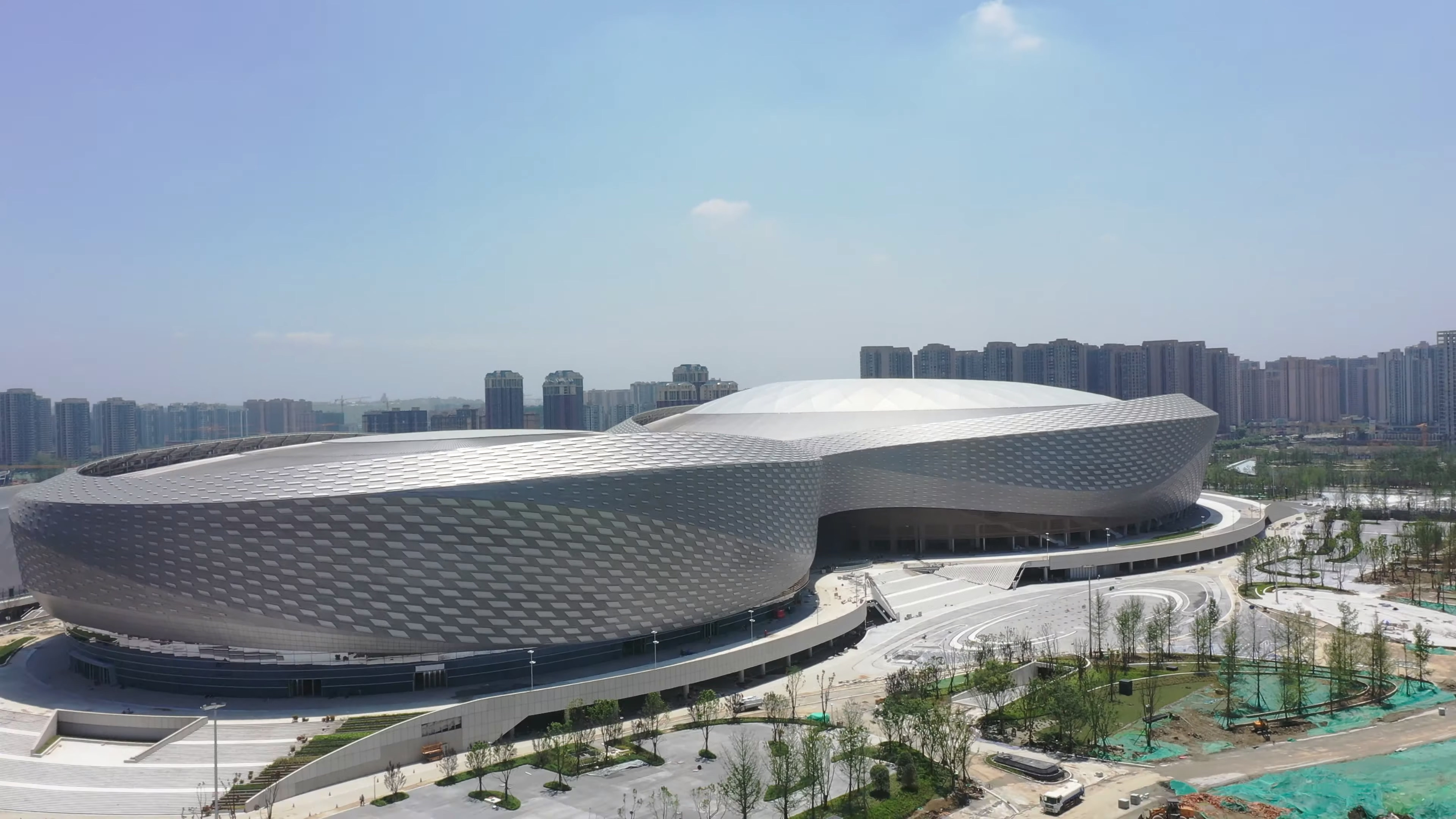
  Fenghuangshan Arena
- Chengdu Open Air Music Park – Closing ceremony

Pidu District

- Pidu Sports Centre Natatorium – Fencing
- Xihua University Gymnasium – Volleyball (finals)

Longquanyi District

- Chengdu Sport University Gymnasium – Gymnastics (Rhythmic)

Xinjin District

- Shichuan Water Sports School – Rowing

Qingbaijiang District

- Qingbaijiang Sports Centre Gymnasium – Basketball

Wenjiang District

- Chengdu University of Traditional Chinese Medicine Wenjiang Campus Gymnasium – Basketball and Volleyball
- Sichuan Vocational and Technical College of Communications Hongyi Gymnasium – Volleyball

Jinjiang District

- Sichuan Water Sports School – Rowing
- Jinjiang International Event Centre – Basketball

Chengdu Hi-Tech Industrial Development Zone

- Tianfu Software Park Sports Center – Table tennis
- Southwest Jiaotong University Xipu Campus Gymnasium – Volleyball
- University of Electronic Science and Technology of China Qingshuihe Campus Gymnasium – Basketball

Qingyang District

- Sichuan Normal University, Wanjiang Campus Gymnasium – Taekwondo
- Southwestern University of Finance and Economics Guanghua Campus Gymnasium – Volleyball

Jianyang County

- Cultural and Sports Centre Gymnasium – Judo
- Cultural and Sports Centre Natatorium – Diving

== Ceremonies ==
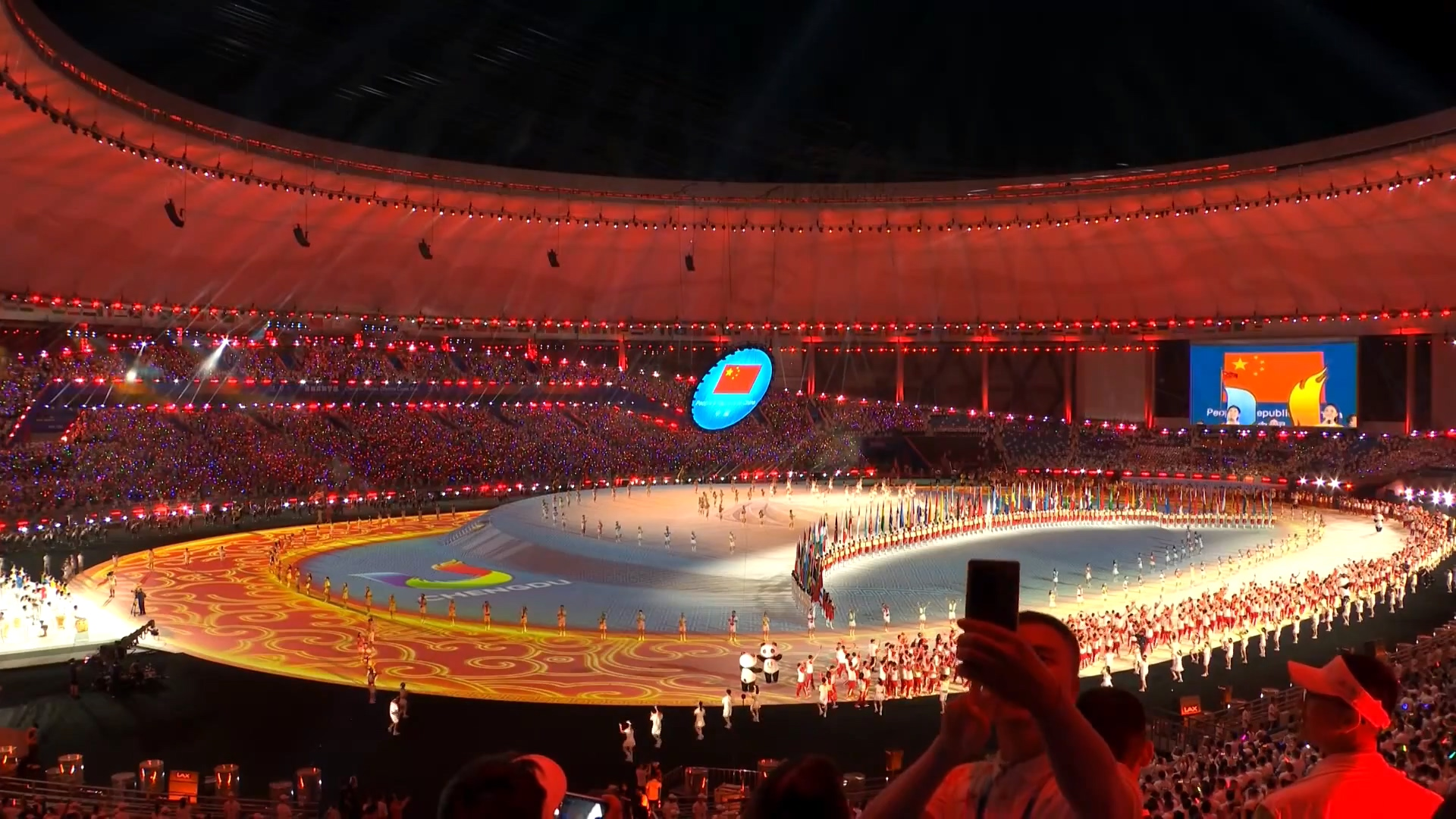
The opening ceremony

The opening ceremony was held on the evening of 28 July 2023 at the newly built Dong'an Lake Stadium, which replaced the Chengdu Stadium as the main city sports venue. The ceremony featured the parade of nations and other aspects of the traditional protocol, including the raising of the FISU flag, the opening declaration, and the athlete's, coach's and judge's oaths. The artistic portion showcased the cultural features of the host city and province and blended technology with art. The flame was lit by taikonaut Ye Guangfu (who also born in Chengdu) along with 30 university sport athletes representing each previous edition of the World University Games. The ceremony concluded with a gold-colored fireworks display, aptly titled "Golden Dreams."

The closing ceremony was held on the evening of 8 August 2023 at Chengdu Open Air Music Park. The ceremony was more modest and featured the athletes' entrance and other aspects of the traditional protocol, including the lowering of the FISU flag and the closing declaration. The artistic portion featured modern music-and-dance performances along with references to traditional Sichuan opera. The FISU flag was then handed over to Germany’s Rhine-Ruhr Region (the host of the next edition in 2025), which then presented a handover segment titled "Rhine-Ruhr 2025 - Passionately Connected by Fire and Water." The flame was then extinguished before the ensemble cast performed a rendition of the traditional farewell song "Auld Lang Syne."

== Medal table ==
* Host nation (China)

Rank	Nation	Gold	Silver	Bronze	Total
1	China*	103	40	35	178
2	Japan	21	29	43	93
3	South Korea	17	18	23	58
4	Italy	17	18	21	56
5	Poland	15	16	13	44
6	Turkey	11	12	12	35
7	India	11	5	10	26
8	Chinese Taipei	10	17	19	46
9	Lithuania	6	4	2	12
10	France	5	8	10	23
11	Iran	5	6	12	23
12	Germany	4	8	12	24
13	Ukraine	4	4	3	11
14	Czech Republic	4	3	5	12
15	Indonesia	4	3	0	7
16	Hong Kong	4	1	7	12
17	Hungary	3	8	6	17
18	Portugal	3	4	0	7
19	South Africa	2	11	7	20
20	Kazakhstan	2	7	11	20
21	Thailand	2	4	6	12
22	Netherlands	2	3	4	9
23	Switzerland	2	1	4	7
24	United States	1	9	13	23
25	Macau	1	3	3	7
26	Slovakia	1	2	0	3
27	Malaysia	1	1	5	7
28	Australia	1	1	3	5
29	Jamaica	1	1	0	2
29	Luxembourg	1	1	0	2
29	Uganda	1	1	0	2
32	Finland	1	0	3	4
33	Austria	1	0	1	2
33	Bulgaria	1	0	1	2
35	Ghana	1	0	0	1
36	Uzbekistan	0	8	6	14
37	Brazil	0	7	6	13
38	Azerbaijan	0	3	6	9
39	Algeria	0	1	3	4
40	Cyprus	0	1	2	3
40	Romania	0	1	2	3
42	Moldova	0	1	1	2
43	Brunei	0	1	0	1
43	Singapore	0	1	0	1
45	Georgia	0	0	4	4
45	Mongolia	0	0	4	4
47	Vietnam	0	0	3	3
48	Armenia	0	0	2	2
48	Spain	0	0	2	2
50	Belgium	0	0	1	1
50	Croatia	0	0	1	1
50	Kyrgyzstan	0	0	1	1
50	Turkmenistan	0	0	1	1
Totals (53 entries)		269	273	339	881

== Sports ==
Because of the establishment of the FISU University Football World Cup in 2019, football would no longer be part of the program starting from this edition. With this change, the number of compulsory sports would be kept at fifteen, and so it was decided that from this edition onwards, badminton would take its place after five editions as an optional sport The three optional sports chosen by the Organizing Committee were shooting, rowing and wushu.

- Aquatics
  - Diving (15)
  - Swimming (42)
  - Water polo (2)
- Archery (10)
- Athletics (50)
- Badminton (6)
- Basketball (2)
- Fencing (12)
- Gymnastics
  - Artistic gymnastics (14)
  - Rhythmic gymnastics (8)
- Judo (16)
- Rowing (15)
- Shooting (18)
- Table tennis (7)
- Taekwondo (23)
- Tennis (7)
- Volleyball (2)
- Wushu (19)

== Participating NUSFs ==
The following 116 National University Sporting Federations sent delegations to the 2021 Summer World University Games.

Participating National University Sports Federations
1. Albania (2)
2. Algeria (47)
3. Angola (2)
4. Argentina (56)
5. Armenia (14)
6. Australia (85)
7. Austria (29)
8. Azerbaijan (87)
9. Bangladesh (2)
10. Barbados (2)
11. Belgium (5)
12. Botswana (9)
13. Brazil (151)
14. Brunei (2)
15. Bulgaria (5)
16. Burkina Faso (2)
17. Burundi (7)
18. Cambodia (11)
19. Cape Verde (2)
20. China (411) (host)
21. Colombia (25)
22. Comoros (2)
23. Costa Rica (2)
24. Croatia (13)
25. Cyprus (19)
26. Czech Republic (94)
27. Denmark (13)
28. Ecuador (2)
29. Estonia (15)
30. Equatorial Guinea (1)
31. Fiji (1)
32. Finland (67)
33. France (102)
34. The Gambia (2)
35. Georgia (27)
36. Germany (163)
37. Ghana (12)
38. Greece (26)
39. Guatemala (2)
40. Guyana (6)
41. Haiti (5)
42. Honduras (2)
43. Hong Kong (143)
44. Hungary (105)
45. India (231)
46. Indonesia (51)
47. Israel (5)
48. Iran (83)
49. Iraq (4)
50. Italy (164)
51. Jamaica (3)
52. Japan (264)
53. Kazakhstan (87)
54. Kenya (2)
55. Kyrgyzstan (16)
56. South Korea (250)
57. Kuwait (3)
58. Latvia (3)
59. Lebanon (7)
60. Libya (6)
61. Liechtenstein (1)
62. Lithuania (36)
63. Luxembourg (3)
64. Macau (49)
65. Madagascar (3)
66. Malaysia (66)
67. Mali (2)
68. Moldova (17)
69. Mongolia (80)
70. Morocco (10)
71. Mozambique (2)
72. Netherlands (38)
73. Nepal (18)
74. Nigeria (75)
75. Northern Mariana Islands (2)
76. Norway (30)
77. Oman (26)
78. Pakistan (5)
79. Palestine (2)
80. Panama (1)
81. Peru (7)
82. Philippines (34)
83. Poland (198)
84. Portugal (44)
85. Qatar (6)
86. Romania (41)
87. Saint Kitts and Nevis (33)
88. São Tomé and Príncipe (1)
89. Saudi Arabia (10)
90. Senegal (8)
91. Sierra Leone (3)
92. Singapore (112)
93. Slovakia (79)
94. Slovenia (25)
95. Somalia (2)
96. South Africa (125)
97. Spain (36)
98. Sri Lanka (17)
99. Sweden (13)
100. Switzerland (73)
101. Syria (1)
102. Chinese Taipei (212)
103. Tajikistan (6)
104. Tanzania (2)
105. Thailand (43)
106. Turkey (97)
107. Turkmenistan (16)
108. Uganda (36)
109. Ukraine (58)
110. United Arab Emirates (4)
111. United States (189)
112. Uruguay (2)
113. Uzbekistan (66)
114. Vietnam (7)
115. Zambia (14)
116. Zimbabwe (7)

== Non-participating NUSFs ==
=== Withdrawing NUSFs ===
1. Canada: Canada withdrew from participating in the event due to monetary and logistic issues and health risks.
2. Mexico: Also withdrew from participating in the event due budgetary and logistics issues.
3. New Zealand: Withdrew from participating in the event due to COVID-19 crisis.
4. United Kingdom: BUCS (British Universities and Colleges Sport) Also withdrew from participating in the event due budgetary issues.

=== Banned NUSFs ===
Both Belarus and Russia were banned from the games due to the Russian invasion of Ukraine and Russian Olympic Committee was allowed to compete.

1. Belarus
2. Russia

== Controversies ==
=== India wushu team visas incidents ===
India withdrew its wushu team to protest against the issuance of Chinese stapled visas to athletes from Arunachal Pradesh, which China views as part of southern Tibet.

=== Somali 100-meter nepotism allegations ===
During the 100-meter race, Somali athlete Nasra Ali Abukar finished last with a time of 21.81 seconds, more than 10 seconds behind the winning runner. The video of Ali Abukar's exceptionally poor performance went viral on social media, with the Somali athletics officials drawing criticism for allowing a person with no athletic background and minimal preparation to represent the country. Allegations of nepotism were levied against the Somali Athletics Federation, as it was revealed that Ali Abukar is the niece of Somali Olympic Committee President Abdullahi Ahmed Tarabi and Somali Athletics Federation Chair Khadija Adan Dahir. Somali Minister of Youth and Sport Mohamed Barre apologized for the incident and ordered an investigation into Ali Abukar's selection. This investigation resulted in the Somali Olympic Committee suspending Dahir, who eventually resigned from her position.

== Marketing ==
=== Motto ===
The official motto of the games is "Chengdu Makes Dreams Come True" (Chinese: 成都成就梦想; pinyin: Chéngdū chéngjiù mèngxiǎng).

=== Logo ===
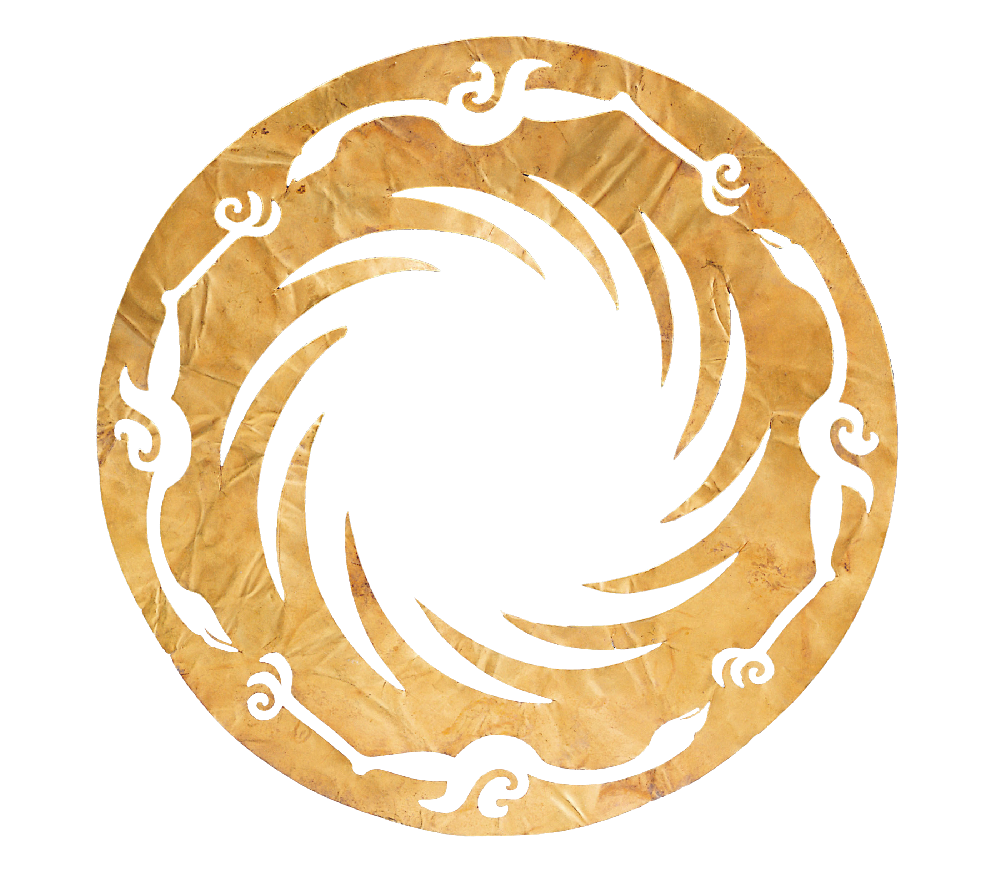
Sun and Immortal Birds Gold Ornament

The logo of the games draws inspiration from the Golden Sun Bird, a symbol of ancient Sichuan culture and also from the letter 'U' that stands for university sports.

=== Mascot ===
The mascot "Rong Bao" (Chinese: 蓉宝), a giant panda, was unveiled on 30 December 2019. "蓉" stands for Chengdu and "宝" means Treasure.

== Schedule ==
The original schedule was published on 26 August 2021. However, FISU announced on 6 May 2022 that the Games had been rescheduled for 2023 in a period between the 2023 World Aquatics Championships and the 2023 World Athletics Championships and this led to a readjustment of the calendar.

All times and dates use China Standard Time (UTC+8)

OC	Opening ceremony	●	Event competitions	1	Event finals	CC	Closing ceremony

July/August		27 Thu	28 Fri	29 Sat	30 Sun	31 Mon	1 Tue	2 Wed	3 Thu	4 Fri	5 Sat	6 Sun	7 Mon	8 Tue	Events
Ceremonies			OC											CC	
Aquatics
Aquatics	Diving					2	1	1	3	2	1	1	4		15
Aquatics	Swimming						4	5	6	7	5	7	8		42
Aquatics	Water polo	●	●	●	●	●	●	●	●	●	●	●	1	1	2
Archery		●	●	●	6	4									10
Athletics							2	6	10	7	11	14			50
Badminton					●	●	●	1		●	●	●	5		6
Basketball			●	●	●	●	●	●	●	●	1	1			2
Fencing								2	2	2	2	2	2		12
Gymnastics
Gymnastics	Artistic						●	1	1	2	10				14
Gymnastics	Rhythmic			●	2	6									8
Judo				5	4	5	2								16
Rowing										●	1	14			15
Shooting				4	4	2	6	2							18
Table tennis				●	●	●	2	●	1	2	2				7
Taekwondo				2	3	4	4	4	4	2					23
Tennis				●	●	●	●	●	●	●	2	5			7
Volleyball			●	●	●	●	●	●	●	●	●	1	1		2
Wushu				6	8	●	●	●	5						19
Daily medal events		0	0	17	27	23	21	23	32	26	35	45	21	1	269
Cumulative total		0	0	17	44	67	88	111	143	167	201	246	268	269	

== See also ==
- Previous Universiades celebrated in China
  - 2001 Summer Universiade – Beijing
  - 2009 Winter Universiade – Harbin
  - 2011 Summer Universiade – Shenzhen
- Other international multi-sport events held in China in 2023
  - 2022 Asian Games – Hangzhou
  - 2022 Asian Para Games – Hangzhou
