= Tennis at the 2021 Summer World University Games – Women's singles =

Women's singles at the 2021 Summer World University Games
- Venue: Sichuan International Tennis Centre
- Location: Chengdu, China
- Dates: 29 July 2023 – 6 August 2023
- Competitors: 44 from 25 nations

Medalists
gold medal	Gao Hanyu	China
silver medal	Yang Ya-yi	Chinese Taipei
bronze medal	Alice Robbe	France
bronze medal	Liang En-shuo	Chinese Taipei

Women's singles
- Tennis at the 2021 Summer World University Games

Events
Singles	men	women
Doubles	men	women	mixed
Team	men	women
← 2019 ·	Summer World University Games	· 2023 →

The women's singles tennis event at the 2021 Summer World University Games was held from 29 July to 6 August at the Sichuan International Tennis Centre in Chengdu, China.

China's Gao Hanyu won the gold medal, defeating Chinese Taipei's Yang Ya-yi in the final, 2–6, 6–1, 6–1.

France's Alice Robbe and Chinese Taipei's Liang En-shuo won the bronze medals.

== Seeds ==
All seeds receive a bye into the second round.

1. Alice Robbe (FRA) (semi-finals; bronze medalist)
2. Liang En-shuo (TPE) (semi-finals; bronze medalist)
3. Yang Ya-yi (TPE) (final; silver medalist)
4. Misaki Matsuda (JPN) (quarter-finals)
5. Wong Hong Yi (HKG) (third round)
6. Lanlana Tararudee (THA) (third round)
7. Adithya Karunaratne (HKG) (quarter-finals)
8. Ikumi Yamazaki (JPN) (third round)
9. Anchisa Chanta (THA) (quarter-finals)
10. Guo Hanyu (CHN) (champion; gold medalist)
11. Kim Da-bin (KOR) (quarter-finals)
12. Lee Eun-hye (KOR) (third round)
13. Zheng Wushuang (CHN) (third round)
14. Kimberly Hance (USA) (third round)
15. Sravya Chilakalapudi (IND) (third round)
16. Taylor Johnson (USA) (third round)

== Draw ==
Key

- Q = Qualifier
- WC = Wild card
- LL = Lucky loser
- Alt = Alternate
- ITF = ITF entry
- PR = Protected ranking
- SR = Special ranking
- SE = Special exempt
- JE = Junior exempt
- JR = Junior Accelerator Programme entrant
- CO = College Accelerator Programme entrant
- NG = Next Gen Accelerator Program entrant
- w/o = Walkover
- r = Retired
- d = Defaulted

=== Finals ===
Semi-finals
1	Alice Robbe (FRA)	6	1	6^{11}
3	Yang Ya-yi (TPE)	4	6	7^{13}
10	Guo Hanyu (CHN)	7	3	6
2	Liang En-shuo (TPE)	5	6	0

Final
3	Yang Ya-yi (TPE)	6	1	1
10	Guo Hanyu (CHN)	2	6	6

=== Top half ===
==== Section 1 ====
First round
T de Souza (BRA)	6	6
J Nakayenga (UGA)	2	0
P Ingale (IND)	6	4	0
J Padilla (COL)	4	6	6
A Weir (AUS)	4	3
N Espolova (UZB)	6	6

Second round
1	A Robbe (FRA)	6	6
T de Souza (BRA)	0	0
A Zarycká (CZE)	0	2
13	Zheng WS (CHN)	6	6
9	A Chanta (THA)	6	6
J Padilla (COL)	0	2
N Espolova (UZB)	0	2
8	I Yamazaki (JPN)	6	6

Third round
1	A Robbe (FRA)	5	7	1
13	Zheng WS (CHN)	7	5	1^{r}
9	A Chanta (THA)	6^{4}	6	7
8	I Yamazaki (JPN)	7^{7}	1	5

Quarter-finals
1	A Robbe (FRA)	4	6	7^{13}
9	A Chanta (THA)	6	1	6^{11}

==== Section 2 ====
First round
M Vos (RSA)	2	6	3
R Čisovská (SVK)	6	2	6
M Campino (POR)	6	6
A Erdenbileg (MGL)	1	0
F Bayogo (PHI)	2	2
P Sazambile (ZAM)	6	6

Second round
3	Yang Y-y (TPE)	6	6
R Čisovská (SVK)	3	4
F Kusumawati (INA)	4	0
14	K Hance (USA)	6	6
11	Kim D-b (KOR)	6	6
M Campino (POR)	0	1
P Sazambile (ZAM)	1	0
5	Wong H Y (HKG)	6	6

Third round
3	Yang Y-y (TPE)	6	6
14	K Hance (USA)	2	0
11	Kim D-b (KOR)	4	6	2
5	Wong H Y (HKG)	6	0	0^{r}

Quarter-finals
3	Yang Y-y (TPE)	6	6
11	Kim D-b (KOR)	4	2

=== Bottom half ===
==== Section 3 ====
First round
A Stevens (AUS)	6	6
P Athieno (UGA)	2	1
M I Fonte (POR)	4	7	6
H Narmont (EST)	6	5	4
L Stará (SVK)	6	6
L Morkel (RSA)	2	3

Second round
6	L Tararudee (THA)	6	6
A Stevens (AUS)	0	1
M I Fonte (POR)
10	Guo HY (CHN)	w	/	o
16	T Johnson (USA)	6	6
B Danjuma (NGR)	0	0
L Stará (SVK)	3	3
4	M Matsuda (JPN)	6	6

Third round
6	L Tararudee (THA)	2	6	3
10	Guo HY (CHN)	6	0	6
16	T Johnson (USA)	5	4
4	M Matsuda (JPN)	7	6

Quarter-finals
10	Guo HY (CHN)	7	3	6
4	M Matsuda (JPN)	5	6	0

==== Section 4 ====
First round
J Barcia (PHI)	2	1
C Aussert (FRA)	6	6
J Wira (INA)	1	2
N Kněžková (CZE)	6	6
Q Sakala (ZAM)	1	0
O Valikhanova (UZB)	6	6

Second round
7	A Karunaratne (HKG)	6	6
C Aussert (FRA)	3	1
N Kněžková (CZE)	4	5
12	Lee E-h (KOR)	6	7
15	S Chilakalapudi (IND)	6	6
B Ortenzi (ITA)	2	1
O Valikhanova (UZB)	0	1
2	Liang E-s (TPE)	6	6

Third round
7	A Karunaratne (HKG)	6	5	6
12	Lee E-h (KOR)	3	7	1
15	S Chilakalapudi (IND)	3	5
2	Liang E-s (TPE)	6	7

Quarter-finals
7	A Karunaratne (HKG)	3	5
2	Liang E-s (TPE)	6	7

== Consolation round ==
=== Seeds ===
All seeds receive a bye into the second round.

1. Lisa Marie Rioux (JPN) (final)
2. Anri Nagata (JPN) (champion)
3. Pooja Ingale (IND) (semi-finals)
4. Helena Narmont (EST) (semi-finals)

=== Draw ===
First round
Adithi Are (IND)	2	2
Lize Morkel (RSA)	6	6
Jessica Wira (INA)	6	6
Jovia Nakayenga (UGA)	0	0
Marine Vos (RSA)	6	7
Tayna de Souza (BRA)	2	5
Alexandra Weir (AUS)	2	6	11
4	Helena Narmont (EST)	6	3	13
Ramesh Shibasini (IND)	6	6
Patience Athieno (UGA)	1	3

Quarter-finals
1	Lisa Marie Rioux (JPN)	6	6
Lize Morkel (RSA)	2	2
3	Pooja Ingale (IND)	7	6
Jessica Wira (INA)	5	4
Marine Vos (RSA)	2	4
4	Helena Narmont (EST)	6	6
Ramesh Shibasini (IND)	1	0
2	Anri Nagata (JPN)	6	6

Semi-finals
1	Lisa Marie Rioux (JPN)	6	6
3	Pooja Ingale (IND)	2	1
4	Helena Narmont (EST)	3	6	9
2	Anri Nagata (JPN)	6	2	11

Final
1	Lisa Marie Rioux (JPN)
2	Anri Nagata (JPN)	w	/	o
