= Tennis at the 2021 Summer World University Games – Women's doubles =

Women's doubles at the 2021 Summer World University Games
- Venue: Sichuan International Tennis Centre
- Location: Chengdu, China
- Dates: 30 July 2023 – 5 August 2023
- Competitors: 38 from 19 nations

Medalists
gold medal	Liang En-shuo; Wu Fang-hsien	Chinese Taipei
silver medal	Guo Hanyu; Jiang Xinyu	China
bronze medal	Kimberly Hance; Elise Wagle	United States
bronze medal	Misaki Matsuda; Ikumi Yamazaki	Japan

Women's doubles
- Tennis at the 2021 Summer World University Games

Events
Singles	men	women
Doubles	men	women	mixed
Team	men	women
← 2019 ·	Summer World University Games	· 2023 →

The women's doubles tennis event at the 2021 Summer World University Games was held from 30 July to 5 August at the Sichuan International Tennis Centre in Chengdu, China.

Chinese Taipei's Liang En-shuo / Wu Fang-hsien won the gold medal, defeating China's Guo Hanyu / Jiang Xinyu in the final, 7–5, 6–4.

United States' Kimberly Hance / Elise Wagle and Japan's Misaki Matsuda / Ikumi Yamazaki won the bronze medals.

== Seeds ==
All seeds receive a bye into the second round.

1. Liang En-shuo / Wu Fang-hsien (TPE) (champion; gold medalist)
2. Misaki Matsuda / Ikumi Yamazaki (JPN) (semi-finals; bronze medalist)
3. Punnin Kovapitukted / Lanlana Tararudee (THA) (quarter-finals)
4. Guo Hanyu / Jiang Xinyu (CHN) (final; silver medalist)
5. Leong Kwan Tung / Wong Hong Yi (HKG) (quarter-finals)
6. Luna Dormet / Alice Robbe (FRA) (quarter-finals)
7. Romana Čisovská / Lenka Stará (SVK) (quarter-finals)
8. Kimberly Hance / Elise Wagle (USA) (semi-finals; bronze medalist)

== Draw ==
Key

- Q = Qualifier
- WC = Wild card
- LL = Lucky loser
- Alt = Alternate
- ITF = ITF entry
- PR = Protected ranking
- SR = Special ranking
- SE = Special exempt
- JE = Junior exempt
- JR = Junior Accelerator Programme entrant
- CO = College Accelerator Programme entrant
- NG = Next Gen Accelerator Program entrant
- w/o = Walkover
- r = Retired
- d = Defaulted

=== Finals ===
Semi-finals
1	Liang En-shuo (TPE); Wu Fang-hsien (TPE)	6	6
8	Kimberly Hance (USA); Elisa Wagle (USA)	2	2
4	Guo Hanyu (CHN); Jiang Xinyu (CHN)	6	6
2	Misaki Matsuda (JPN); Ikumi Yamazaki (JPN)	2	0

Final
1	Liang En-shuo (TPE); Wu Fang-hsien (TPE)	7	6
4	Guo Hanyu (CHN); Jiang Xinyu (CHN)	5	4

=== Top half ===
==== Section 1 ====
First round
P Athieno (UGA); J Nakayenga (UGA)	0	0
F Kusumawati (INA); J Wira (INA)	6	6

Second round
1	Liang E-s (TPE); Wu F-h (TPE)	6	6
F Kusumawati (INA); J Wira (INA)	0	0
A Are (IND); R Shibasini (IND)	1	1
6	L Dormet (FRA); A Robbe (FRA)	6	6

Quarter-finals
1	Liang E-s (TPE); Wu F-h (TPE)	6	6
6	L Dormet (FRA); A Robbe (FRA)	1	3

==== Section 2 ====
First round

Second round
3	P Kovapitukted (THA); L Tararudee (THA)	6	6
Q Sakala (ZAM); P Sazambile (ZAM)	1	0
A Stevens (AUS); A Weir (AUS)	3	1
8	K Hance (USA); E Wagle (USA)	6	6

Quarter-finals
3	P Kovapitukted (THA); L Tararudee (THA)	5	2
8	K Hance (USA); E Wagle (USA)	7	6

=== Bottom half ===
==== Section 3 ====
First round
Moon J (KOR); Oh E-j (KOR)	6	6
A Musabekova (UZB); O Valikhanova (UZB)	4	4

Second round
7	R Čisovská (SVK); L Stará (SVK)	6	6
E de Kock (RSA); M Langa (RSA)	2	4
Moon J (KOR); Oh E-j (KOR)	0	2
4	Guo HY (CHN); Jiang XY (CHN)	6	6

Quarter-finals
7	R Čisovská (SVK); L Stará (SVK)	3	2
4	Guo HY (CHN); Jiang XY (CHN)	6	6

==== Section 4 ====
First round
A Erdenbileg (MGL); Y Ganbaatar (MGL)	w	/	o
M Campino (POR); M I Fonte (POR)

Second round
5	Leong K T (HKG); Wong H Y (HKG)	4	6	10
N Kněžková (CZE); A Zarycká (CZE)	6	2	4
A Erdenbileg (MGL); Y Ganbaatar (MGL)	0	0
2	M Matsuda (JPN); I Yamazaki (JPN)	6	6

Quarter-finals
5	Leong K T (HKG); Wong H Y (HKG)	2	6	9
2	M Matsuda (JPN); I Yamazaki (JPN)	6	3	11
