= Tennis at the 2021 Summer World University Games – Mixed doubles =

Mixed doubles at the 2021 Summer World University Games
- Venue: Sichuan International Tennis Centre
- Location: Chengdu, China
- Dates: 1 August 2023 – 6 August 2023
- Competitors: 44 from 22 nations

Medalists
gold medal	Hsu Yu-hsiou; Wu Fang-hsien	Chinese Taipei
silver medal	Jin Yuquan; Tang Qianhui	China
bronze medal	Tomoya Fujiwara; Lisa Marie Rioux	Japan
bronze medal	Wong Chak Lam; Wong Hong Yi	Hong Kong

Mixed doubles
- Tennis at the 2021 Summer World University Games

Events
Singles	men	women
Doubles	men	women	mixed
Team	men	women
← 2019 ·	Summer World University Games	· 2023 →

The mixed doubles tennis event at the 2021 Summer World University Games was held from 1 to 6 August at the Sichuan International Tennis Centre in Chengdu, China.

Chinese Taipei's Hsu Yu-hsiou / Wu Fang-hsien won the gold medal, defeating China's Jin Yuquan / Tang Qianhui in the final, 7–6^{(7–2)}, 2–6, 10–6.

Japan's Tomoya Fujiwara / Lisa Marie Rioux and Hong Kong's Wong Chak Lam / Wong Hong Yi won the bronze medals.

== Seeds ==
All seeds receive a bye into the second round.

1. Hsu Yu-hsiou / Wu Fang-hsien (TPE) (champion; gold medalist)
2. Wong Chak Lam / Wong Hong Yi (HKG) (semi-finals; bronze medalist)
3. Tomoya Fujiwara / Lisa Marie Rioux (JPN) (semi-finals; bronze medalist)
4. Adrien Gobat / Alice Robbe (FRA) (quarter-finals)
5. Jin Yuquan / Tang Qianhui (CHN) (final; silver medalist)
6. Chu Seok-hyeon / Kim Da-bin (KOR) (second round)
7. Prakash Jaya / Sravya Chilakalapudi (IND) (second round)
8. Joshua Charlton / Amy Stevens (AUS) (quarter-finals)

== Draw ==
Key

- Q = Qualifier
- WC = Wild card
- LL = Lucky loser
- Alt = Alternate
- ITF = ITF entry
- PR = Protected ranking
- SR = Special ranking
- SE = Special exempt
- JE = Junior exempt
- JR = Junior Accelerator Programme entrant
- CO = College Accelerator Programme entrant
- NG = Next Gen Accelerator Program entrant
- w/o = Walkover
- r = Retired
- d = Defaulted

=== Finals ===
Semi-finals
1	Hsu Yu-hsiou (TPE); Wu Fang-hsien (TPE)	6	7
3	Tomoya Fujiwara (JPN); Lisa Marie Rioux (JPN)	2	5
5	Jin Yuquan (CHN); Tang Qianhui (CHN)	5	6	10
2	Wong Chak Lam (HKG); Wong Hong Yi (HKG)	7	4	5

Final
1	Hsu Yu-hsiou (TPE); Wu Fang-hsien (TPE)	7^{7}	2	10
5	Jin Yuquan (CHN); Tang Qianhui (CHN)	6^{2}	6	6

=== Top half ===
==== Section 1 ====
First round
L Kurniawan (INA); J Wira (INA)	7	6
J Fogle (RSA); E de Kock (RSA)	5	1

Second round
1	Hsu Y-h (TPE); Wu F-h (TPE)	6	6
L Kurniawan (INA); J Wira (INA)	3	3
W Clark (USA); E Wagle (USA)	6	6
7	P Jaya (IND); S Chilakalapudi (IND)	4	2

Quarter-finals
1	Hsu Y-h (TPE); Wu F-h (TPE)	6	6
W Clark (USA); E Wagle (USA)	3	2

==== Section 2 ====
First round
C Gonzalez (COL); J Padilla (COL)	7	1	3
F Mirzaganiev (UZB); A Musabekova (UZB)	5	6	10
X Pereira (BRA); T de Souza (BRA)	1	2
C Congcar (THA); Y Chimcham (THA)	6	6

Second round
3	T Fujiwara (JPN); L M Rioux (JPN)	6	6
F Mirzaganiev (UZB); A Musabekova (UZB)	1	3
C Congcar (THA); Y Chimcham (THA)	3	7	11
6	Chu S-h (KOR); Kim D-b (KOR)	6	5	9

Quarter-finals
3	T Fujiwara (JPN); L M Rioux (JPN)	6	6
C Congcar (THA); Y Chimcham (THA)	2	4

=== Bottom half ===
==== Section 3 ====
First round
E Birungi (UGA); P Athieno (UGA)	0	1
F de Amorim Rocha (POR); C Mariana (POR)	6	6
V Tenorio (PHI); J Barcia (PHI)	2	2
G Ortenzi (ITA); B Ortenzi (ITA)	6	6

Second round
5	Jin YQ (CHN); Tang QH (CHN)	6	6
F de Amorim Rocha (POR); C Mariana (POR)	2	2
G Ortenzi (ITA); B Ortenzi (ITA)	3	2
4	A Gobat (FRA); A Robbe (FRA)	6	6

Quarter-finals
5	Jin YQ (CHN); Tang QH (CHN)	3	7	10
4	A Gobat (FRA); A Robbe (FRA)	6	5	0

==== Section 4 ====
First round
J Jermar (CZE); A Zarycká (CZE)	6	6
S Puntsag (MGL); Y Ganbaatar (MGL)	1	0

Second round
8	J Charlton (AUS); A Stevens (AUS)	6	6
N Hamayangwe (ZAM); P Sazambile (ZAM)	0	0
J Jermar (CZE); A Zarycká (CZE)	1	3
2	Wong C L (HKG); Wong H Y (HKG)	6	6

Quarter-finals
8	J Charlton (AUS); A Stevens (AUS)	4	3
2	Wong C L (HKG); Wong H Y (HKG)	6	6
