= Tennis at the 2021 Summer World University Games – Men's singles =

Men's singles at the 2021 Summer World University Games
- Venue: Sichuan International Tennis Centre
- Location: Chengdu, China
- Dates: 29 July 2023 – 6 August 2023
- Competitors: 45 from 25 nations

Medalists
gold medal	Henry von der Schulenburg	Switzerland
silver medal	Kasidit Samrej	Thailand
bronze medal	Sergey Fomin	Uzbekistan
bronze medal	Jang Yun-seok	South Korea

Men's singles
- Tennis at the 2021 Summer World University Games

Events
Singles	men	women
Doubles	men	women	mixed
Team	men	women
← 2019 ·	Summer World University Games	· 2023 →

The men's singles tennis event at the 2021 Summer World University Games was held from 29 July to 6 August at the Sichuan International Tennis Centre in Chengdu, China.

Switzerland's Henry von der Schulenburg won the gold medal, defeating Thailand's Kasidit Samrej in the final, 7–6^{(7–5)}, 4–6, 6–1.

Uzbekistan's Sergey Fomin and South Korea's Jang Yun-seok won the bronze medals.

== Seeds ==
All seeds receive a bye into the second round.

1. Coleman Wong (HKG) (second round)
2. Huang Tsung-hao (TPE) (quarter-finals)
3. Adrien Gobat (FRA) (second round)
4. Kasidit Samrej (THA) (final; silver medalist)
5. Sergey Fomin (UZB) (semi-finals; bronze medalist)
6. Jang Yun-seok (KOR) (semi-finals; bronze medalist)
7. Ray Ho (TPE) (third round)
8. Hikaru Shiraishi (JPN) (quarter-finals)
9. Liu Hanyi (CHN) (third round)
10. Jeffrey von der Schulenburg (SUI) (third round)
11. Francisco de Amorim Rocha (POR) (quarter-finals)
12. Ryotaro Taguchi (JPN) (third round)
13. Louis Dussin (FRA) (third round)
14. Maksim Shin (UZB) (second round)
15. Yuttana Charoenphon (THA) (third round)
16. Joshua Charlton (AUS) (second round)

== Draw ==
Key

- Q = Qualifier
- WC = Wild card
- LL = Lucky loser
- Alt = Alternate
- ITF = ITF entry
- PR = Protected ranking
- SR = Special ranking
- SE = Special exempt
- JE = Junior exempt
- JR = Junior Accelerator Programme entrant
- CO = College Accelerator Programme entrant
- NG = Next Gen Accelerator Program entrant
- w/o = Walkover
- r = Retired
- d = Defaulted

=== Finals ===
Semi-finals
5	Sergey Fomin (UZB)	3	4
Henry von der Schulenburg (SUI)	6	6
4	Kasidit Samrej (THA)	3	6	6
6	Jang Yun-seok (KOR)	6	2	2

Final
Henry von der Schulenburg (SUI)	7^{7}	4	6
4	Kasidit Samrej (THA)	6^{5}	6	1

=== Top half ===
==== Section 1 ====
First round
H Garayev (AZE)	0	1
L Krall (USA)	6	6
V Sklenka (CZE)	6	6
V Tenorio (PHI)	0	0
G Ortenzi (ITA)	6	6
Jin YQ (CHN)	4	2

Second round
1	C Wong (HKG)	3	4
L Krall (USA)	6	6
C Gonzalez (COL)	2	3
15	Y Charoenphon (THA)	6	6
12	R Taguchi (JPN)	6	6
V Sklenka (CZE)	4	1
G Ortenzi (ITA)	4	2
5	S Fomin (UZB)	6	6

Third round
L Krall (USA)	6	6
15	Y Charoenphon (THA)	2	4
12	R Taguchi (JPN)	7	4	2
5	S Fomin (UZB)	5	6	6

Quarter-finals
L Krall (USA)	1	4
5	S Fomin (UZB)	6	6

==== Section 2 ====
First round
L Cronje (RSA)	7^{7}	6
L Bathrinath (IND)	6^{1}	4
H von der Schulenburg (SUI)	6	6
A Marinho (BRA)	0	0
H Munengwa (ZIM)	6	6
J Mwisuke (UGA)	1	3
L Kurniawan (INA)	2	1
Chu S-h (KOR)	6	6

Second round
3	A Gobat (FRA)	3	7^{7}	6^{4}
L Cronje (RSA)	6	6^{1}	7^{7}
H von der Schulenburg (SUI)	6	7^{7}
16	J Charlton (AUS)	2	6^{2}
11	F de Amorim Rocha (POR)	6	6
H Munengwa (ZIM)	0	0
Chu S-h (KOR)	5	2
7	R Ho (TPE)	7	6

Third round
L Cronje (RSA)	4	6^{0}
H von der Schulenburg (SUI)	6	7^{7}
11	F de Amorim Rocha (POR)	7^{7}	6
7	R Ho (TPE)	6^{5}	3

Quarter-finals
H von der Schulenburg (SUI)	7^{9}	7
11	F de Amorim Rocha (POR)	6^{7}	5

=== Bottom half ===
==== Section 3 ====
First round
T Reis (POR)	6	6
M Moncada (COL)	0	0
A Desvianto (INA)	2	3
Ng K L (HKG)	6	6
S Puntsag (MGL)	0	0
K Hans (IND)	6	6

Second round
8	H Shiraishi (JPN)	6	5	7^{7}
T Reis (POR)	3	7	6^{4}
Ng K L (HKG)	5	1
10	J von der Schulenburg (SUI)	7	6
13	L Dussin (FRA)	6	6
J Coetzee (RSA)	3	2
K Hans (IND)	1	6	1
4	K Samrej (THA)	6	3	6

Third round
8	H Shiraishi (JPN)	6	7^{7}
10	J von der Schulenburg (SUI)	4	6^{4}
13	L Dussin (FRA)	6	2	2
4	K Samrej (THA)	2	6	6

Quarter-finals
8	H Shiraishi (JPN)	1	4
4	K Samrej (THA)	6	6

==== Section 4 ====
First round
X Pereira (BRA)	6	6
E Birungi (UGA)	1	0
T Azizov (AZE)	1	2
V Aguiard (AUS)	6	6
L Cloud (USA)	6	6
N Hamayangwe (ZAM)	0	0

Second round
6	Jang Y-s (KOR)	6	6
X Pereira (BRA)	3	2
V Aguiard (AUS)	1	2
9	Liu HY (CHN)	6	6
14	M Shin (UZB)	6^{12}	6	2
J Jermar (CZE)	7^{14}	3	6
L Cloud (USA)	2	6^{1}
2	Huang T-h (TPE)	6	7^{7}

Third round
6	Jang Y-s (KOR)	3	6	6
9	Liu HY (CHN)	6	1	0
J Jermar (CZE)	6^{3}	3
2	Huang T-h (TPE)	7^{7}	6

Quarter-finals
6	Jang Y-s (KOR)	6	7^{7}
2	Huang T-h (TPE)	2	6^{4}

== Consolation round ==
=== Seeds ===
All seeds receive a bye into the second round.

1. Kabir Hans (IND) (semi-finals)
2. Lohithaksha Bathrinath (IND) (final)
3. Victor Sklenka (CZE) (quarter-finals)
4. Prakash Jaya (IND) (semi-finals)

=== Finals ===
Semi-finals
1	Kabir Hans (IND)
Tomoya Fujiwara (JPN)	w	/	o
4	Prakash Jaya (IND)	6^{3}	0^{r}
2	Lohithaksha Bathrinath (IND)	7^{7}	1

Final
Tomoya Fujiwara (JPN)	6	6
2	Lohithaksha Bathrinath (IND)	4	2

=== Top half ===
==== Section 1 ====
First round
L Kurniawan (INA)	6	6
A Marinho (BRA)	0	0

Second round
1	K Hans (IND)	6	7^{7}
L Kurniawan (INA)	1	6^{5}
N Hamayangwe (ZAM)	0	1
M Moncada (COL)	6	6

Quarter-finals
1	K Hans (IND)	6	7^{7}
M Moncada (COL)	1	6^{4}

==== Section 2 ====
First round

Second round
3	V Sklenka (CZE)	6	6
J Mwisuke (UGA)	0	1
T Azizov (AZE)	0	3
T Fujiwara (JPN)	6	6

Quarter-finals
3	V Sklenka (CZE)	1	2
T Fujiwara (JPN)	6	6

=== Bottom half ===
==== Section 3 ====
First round

Second round
X Pereira (BRA)	2	6	6
H Garayev (AZE)	6	3	10
E Birungi (UGA)	1	3
4	P Jaya (IND)	6	6

Quarter-finals
H Garayev (AZE)	0^{r}
4	P Jaya (IND)	5

==== Section 4 ====
First round

Second round
A Desvianto (INA)	2	6	10
C Gonzalez (COL)	6	3	2
J Coetzee (RSA)	4	3
2	L Bathrinath (IND)	6	6

Quarter-finals
A Desvianto (INA)	1	2
2	L Bathrinath (IND)	6	6
