= Chinese Taipei at the 2021 Summer World University Games =

- IOC code: TPE
- NOC: Chinese Taipei University Sports Federation (中華民國大專院校體育總會)
- Website: web2.ctusf.org.tw/index.php

in Chengdu, China 28 July – 8 August 2023
- Competitors: 212 in 15 sports
- Flag bearer: Liao Yi-jen (Volleyball)
- Medals Ranked 8th: Gold 10 Silver 17 Bronze 19 Total 46

Summer World University Games appearances
- 1989; 1991; 1993; 1995; 1997; 1999; 2001; 2003; 2005; 2007; 2009; 2011; 2013; 2015; 2017; 2019; 2021; 2025; 2027

Chinese Taipei at the 2021 Summer Universiade in Chengdu, China with 212 student-athletes participating in 16 sports.

== Medal summary ==
=== Medal table ===
Rank	Sports	Gold	Silver	Bronze	Total
1	Tennis	5	1	1	7
2	Badminton	2	1	2	5
3	Athletics	1	2	2	5
4	Wushu	1	1	2	4
5	Artistic gymnastics	1	1	1	3
6	Taekwondo	0	6	4	10
7	Swimming	0	2	0	2
8	Archery	0	1	3	4
9	Table tennis	0	1	2	3
10	Judo	0	1	0	1
11	Rhythmic gymnastics	0	0	1	1
11	Shooting	0	0	1	1
Totals (12 entries)		10	17	19	46

=== Medalists ===
Medal	Athlete	Sport	Event	Date	News
Gold	Sun Chia-hung	Wushu	Men's taijiquan	30 July	
Gold	Lee Chia-hao; Lee Fang-chih; Liao Jhuo-fu; Lin Chun-yi; Po Li-wei; Ye Hong-wei / Chang Ching-hui; Hsu Wen-chi; Lee Chia-hsin; Sung Shuo-yun; Teng Chun-hsun; Tung Ciou-tong	Badminton	Mixed team	2 August	
Gold	Peng Ming-yang	Athletics	Men's 400 metres hurdles	4 August	
Gold	Lee Chih-kai	Artistic gymnastics	Men's pommel horse	5 August	
Gold	Hsu Yu-hsiou; Huang Tsung-hao	Tennis	Men's doubles	5 August	
Gold	Liang En-shuo; Wu Fang-hsien	Tennis	Women's doubles	5 August	
Gold	Hsu Yu-hsiou; Wu Fang-hsien	Tennis	Mixed doubles	6 August	
Gold	Ho Chen-jui; Hsu Yu-hsiou; Huang Tsung-hao; Lo Chien-hsun	Tennis	Men's team classification	6 August	
Gold	Liang En-shuo; Wu Fang-hsien; Yang Ya-yi; Tsao Chia-yi	Tennis	Women's team classification	6 August	
Gold	Ye Hong-wei; Lee Chia-hsin	Badminton	Mixed doubles	7 August	
Silver	Yang Yung-wei	Judo	Men's 60 kg	29 July	
Silver	Hu Tzu-hsuan	Taekwondo	Women's individual poomsae	29 July	
Silver	Sun Chia-hung	Wushu	Men's taijijian	29 July	
Silver	Kuo Yu-cheng; Chang Yi-chung; Yang Zhong-han	Archery	Men's team recurve	30 July	
Silver	Chiu Yi-jui	Taekwondo	Men's 68 kg	31 July	
Silver	Huang Ying-hsuan	Taekwondo	Women's 46 kg	31 July	
Silver	Lo Chia-ling	Taekwondo	Women's 57 kg	31 July	
Silver	Huang Yan-cheng; Li Hsin-yang; Wang Chen-you; Yang Chia-an; Yang Tzu-yi	Table tennis	Men's team	1 August	
Silver	Jung Jiun-jie	Taekwondo	Men's +87 kg	2 August	
Silver	Fu Chao-hsuan	Athletics	Men's high jump	3 August	
Silver	Wang Hsing-hao	Swimming	Men's 200 metre medley	3 August	
Silver	Su Po-ya	Taekwondo	Women's 53 kg	3 August	
Silver	Wang Kuan-hung	Swimming	Men's 200 metre butterfly	4 August	
Silver	Tseng Wei-sheng	Artistic gymnastics	Men's vault	5 August	
Silver	Wen Hua-yu	Athletics	Men's long jump	6 August	
Silver	Yang Ya-yi	Tennis	Women's singles	6 August	
Silver	Lee Fang-chih; Teng Chun-hsun	Badminton	Mixed doubles	7 August	
Bronze	Chen Yu-ju	Shooting	Women's 10 meter air pistol	29 July	
Bronze	Chen Yue-xi	Wushu	Men's changquan	29 July	
Bronze	Lin Chien-hsi	Wushu	Women's changquan	29 July	
Bronze	Lin Ming-ching; Hsu Yen-hua; Lo Yi-hsuan	Archery	Women's team compound	30 July	
Bronze	Wu Z-wei; Lin Ming-ching	Archery	Mixed team compound	30 July	
Bronze	Hsu Yu-tse; Huang Pin-chieh	Taekwondo	Mixed pair poomsae	30 July	
Bronze	Peng Chia-mao	Archery	Women's individual recurve	31 July	
Bronze	Chan Ting-chen; Lai Hsin-ya; Lo Yu-ching; Peng Fan-xi; Tsai Jui-shan	Rhythmic gymnastics	Women's rhythmic group 3 ribbons + 2 balls	31 July	
Bronze	Chien Tung-chuan; Huang Yu-chiao; Huang Yu-jie; Huang Yu-wen; Li Yu-jhun	Table tennis	Women's team	1 August	
Bronze	Chiu Shao-hsuan	Taekwondo	Women's 62 kg	2 August	
Bronze	Ma Ting-hsia	Taekwondo	Women's +73 kg	2 August	
Bronze	Tsai Wei-chih	Athletics	Men's high jump	3 August	
Bronze	Hsu Hao-yu	Taekwondo	Men's 63 kg	3 August	
Bronze	Shiao Yu-jan	Artistic gymnastics	Men's pommel horse	5 August	
Bronze	Yang Chia-an	Table tennis	Men's singles	5 August	
Bronze	Liang En-shuo	Tennis	Women's singles	5 August	
Bronze	Lin Chia-hsing	Athletics	Men's long jump	6 August	
Bronze	Hsu Wen-chi	Badminton	Women's singles	6 August	
Bronze	Lee Fang-chih; Po Li-wei	Badminton	Men's doubles	6 August	

== Participants ==
Sport	Men	Women	Total
Archery	6	6	12
Athletics	17	11	28
Badminton	6	6	12
Basketball	12	12	24
Fencing	4	—	4
Artistic gymnastics	5	5	10
Rhythmic gymnastics	—	5	5
Judo	3	7	10
Rowing	3	3	6
Shooting	4	6	10
Swimming	6	9	15
Table tennis	5	5	10
Taekwondo	13	13	26
Tennis	4	4	8
Volleyball	12	12	24
Wushu	5	3	8
Total	105	107	212

== Archery ==
=== Recurve ===
Men

Player	Event	Ranking round		First round	Second round	Third round	Quarter-finals	Semi-finals	Final / BM	
Player	Event	Score	Rank	Opponent score	Opponent score	Opponent score	Opponent score	Opponent score	Opponent score	Rank
Kuo Yu-cheng	Individual	656	15	Choffat (SUI); W 6–2	Shabani (IRI); L 2–6	Did not advance				17
Chang Yi-chung	Individual	656	17	Hakim (MAS); W 7–3	Gregori (ITA); L 0–6	Did not advance				17
Yang Zhong-han	Individual	647	26	Möckli (SUI); L 2–6	Did not advance					33
Kuo Yu-cheng; Chang Yi-chung; Yang Zhong-han	Team	1959	7	—		Poland (POL); W 5–4	China (CHN); W 5–4	Italy (ITA); W 5–3	South Korea (KOR); L 0–6	2nd place, silver medalist(s)

Women

Player	Event	Ranking round		First round	Second round	Third round	Quarter-finals	Semi-finals	Final / BM	
Player	Event	Score	Rank	Opponent score	Opponent score	Opponent score	Opponent score	Opponent score	Opponent score	Rank
Peng Chia-mao	Individual	653	7	Bye	Mayumi (JPN); W 7–3	Li (CHN); W 6–0	Kim (KOR); W 6–2	Tursunbek (KAZ); L 5–6	Lee (KOR); W 6–2	3rd place, bronze medalist(s)
Li Tsai-chi	Individual	649	9	Bye	Florent (FRA); W 6–0	Zhou (CHN); W 6–2	Lee (KOR); L 4–6	Did not advance		9
Sui Yun-ching	Individual	625	21	Noceti (ITA); W 6–0	Fallah (IRI); W 6–0	Choi (KOR); L 3–7	Did not advance			17
Peng Chia-mao; Li Tsai-chi; Sui Yun-ching	Team	1927	3	—		India (IND); L 4–5	Did not advance			5

Mixed

Player	Event	Ranking round		First round	Second round	Third round	Quarter-finals	Semi-finals	Final / BM	
Player	Event	Score	Rank	Opponent score	Opponent score	Opponent score	Opponent score	Opponent score	Opponent score	Rank
Kuo Yu-cheng; Peng Chia-mao	Team	1309	5	—	Bye	Poland (POL); W 5–1	France (FRA); L 1–5	Did not advance		5

=== Compound ===
Men

Player	Event	Ranking round		First round	Second round	Third round	Quarter-finals	Semi-finals	Final / BM	
Player	Event	Score	Rank	Opponent score	Opponent score	Opponent score	Opponent score	Opponent score	Opponent score	Rank
Wu Z-wei	Individual	683	9	Bye	Albanese (FRA); W 145–139	Yadav (IND); L 144–145	Did not advance			9
Chang Cheng-wei	Individual	676	15	Bye	Chen (CHN); L 145–148	Did not advance				17
Lin Yu-quan	Individual	665	26	Lo (MAS); L 141–143	Did not advance					33
Wu Z-wei; Chang Cheng-wei; Lin Yu-quan	Team	2024	5	—			France (FRA); L 229–230	Did not advance		5

Women

Player	Event	Ranking round		First round	Second round	Third round	Quarter-finals	Semi-finals	Final / BM	
Player	Event	Score	Rank	Opponent score	Opponent score	Opponent score	Opponent score	Opponent score	Opponent score	Rank
Lin Ming-ching	Individual	673	8	Lo (TPE); W 147–144	Hsu (TPE); W 147–140	Cho (KOR); L 142–144	Did not advance			9
Hsu Yen-hua	Individual	673	9	Loh (SGP); W 143–139	Lin (TPE); L 140–147	Did not advance				17
Lo Yi-hsuan	Individual	648	25	Lin (TPE); L 144–147	Did not advance					33
Lin Ming-ching; Hsu Yen-hua; Lo Yi-hsuan	Team	1994	4	—		Bye	Iran (IRI); W 230–229	South Korea (KOR); L 228–232	China (CHN); W 226–224	3rd place, bronze medalist(s)

Mixed

Player	Event	Ranking round		First round	Second round	Third round	Quarter-finals	Semi-finals	Final / BM	
Player	Event	Score	Rank	Opponent score	Opponent score	Opponent score	Opponent score	Opponent score	Opponent score	Rank
Wu Z-wei; Lin Ming-ching	Team	1356	4	—		Bye	Italy (ITA); W 153^{19}–153^{18}	South Korea (KOR); L 154^{19}–154^{20}	China (CHN); W 158–155	3rd place, bronze medalist(s)

== Athletics ==
Key

- Note–Ranks given for track events are within the athlete's heat only
- Q = Qualified for the next round
- q = Qualified for the next round as a fastest loser or, in field events, by position without achieving the qualifying target
- qR = Advanced to the next round by referee
- NR = National record
- OR = Olympic record
- N/A = Round not applicable for the event
- Bye = Athlete not required to compete in round

=== Road and track event ===
Men

Athlete	Event	Heat		Semi-finals		Final	
Athlete	Event	Result	Rank	Result	Rank	Result	Rank
Lin Yu-sian	100 metres	10.53	16 q	10.29 PB	4 Q	10.24 PB	4
Chen Wen-pu	100 metres	10.50	12 q	10.32 PB	10	Did not advance	
Ke Wu Yen-ming	200 metres	20.84	4 Q	20.58	4 Q	20.70	6
Song Yu-jun	200 metres	21.25	17 Q	21.18	21	Did not advance	
Peng Ming-yang	400 metres hurdles	50.16	3 Q	48.97 PB	1 Q	48.62 PB NR	1st place, gold medalist(s)
Chen Jian-rong	400 metres hurdles	52.03	20	Did not advance			
Chen Wen-pu; Huang Zho-jyun; Lin Yu-sian; Wei Tai-sheng	4 × 100 metres relay	39.17	6 Q	—		38.86 PB	4
Chou Hsien-feng	Half marathon	—				1:12:56	30

Women

Athlete	Event	Heat		Semi-finals		Final	
Athlete	Event	Result	Rank	Result	Rank	Result	Rank
Liu Li-lin	100 metres	12.03	30	Did not advance			
Zheng Xin-ying	100 metres	12.03	31	Did not advance			
Zhang Bo-ya	200 metres	24.03 PB	14 q	23.77 PB	11	Did not advance	
Chang Li-ling	200 metres	24.59	26	Did not advance			
Hsu Le	100 metres hurdles	13.53	16 q	13.75	16	Did not advance	
Lin Shih-ting	100 metres hurdles	14.14	23	Did not advance			
Lin Yu-chieh	400 metres hurdles	1:00.88	15 q	1:02.71	16	Did not advance	
Chang Li-ling; Liu Li-lin; Zhang Bo-ya; Zheng Xin-ying	4 × 100 metres relay	44.91	5 Q	—		45.14	7

=== Field events ===
Men

Athlete	Event	Qualification		Final	
Athlete	Event	Result	Rank	Result	Rank
Fu Chao-hsuan	High jump	2.20	5 q	2.20	2nd place, silver medalist(s)
Tsai Wei-chih	High jump	2.15	=9 q	2.20	= (bronze)
Lin Tsung-hsien	Pole vault	—		5.25 PB	9
Wen Hua-yu	Long jump	7.93 PB	2 q	7.83	2nd place, silver medalist(s)
Lin Chia-hsing	Long jump	7.80	=3 q	7.83	3rd place, bronze medalist(s)
Li Yun-chen	Triple jump	15.48	14	Did not advance	

Women

Athlete	Event	Qualification		Final	
Athlete	Event	Result	Rank	Result	Rank
Lee Ching-ching	High jump	1.80	=6 q	1.80	11
Jhang Chiau-yin	High jump	1.75	=17	Did not advance	
Yu Ya-chien	Hammer throw	62.17	6 q	66.46	4

=== Combines events ===
Men's decathlon

Athlete	Event	100 m	LJ	SP	HJ	400 m	110H	DT	PV	JT	1500 m	Final	Rank
Ting Sheng-hsuan	Result	11.79	6.50	12.42	1.84	53.46	15.46	36.79 PB	4.20	53.90 PB	5:19.60	6,512	9
Ting Sheng-hsuan	Points	693	697	632	661	662	795	600	673	647	452	6,512	9
Wang Chen-yu	Result	12.07	NM	12.19	DNS	—						DNF	—
Wang Chen-yu	Points	637	0	618	–	—						DNF	—

Women's heptathlon

Athlete	Event	100H	HJ	SP	200 m	LJ	JT	800 m	Final	Rank
Chen Cai-juan	Result	14.19 SB	1.71	13.05	25.38 SB	5.76	40.79	2:30.97	5,542	10
Chen Cai-juan	Points	952	867	731	852	777	682	681	5,542	10

== Badminton ==
Singles

Player	Event	Round of 64	Round of 32	Round of 16	Quarter-finals	Semi-finals	Final / BM	
Player	Event	Opponent score	Opponent score	Opponent score	Opponent score	Opponent score	Opponent score	Rank
Lin Chun-yi	Men	Bye	Alič (SLO); W 2–0	Cheong (MAS); W 2–0	Noda (JPN); L 0–2	Did not advance		5
Liao Jhuo-fu	Men	Corrales (PHI); W 2–0	Scheiwiller (SUI); W 2–0	Dong (CHN); L 1–2	Did not advance			9
Lee Chia-hao	Men	Bye	Wang (CHN); L 1–2	Did not advance				17
Hsu Wen-chi	Women	Bye	Vieira (BRA); W 2–0	Yeung (HKG); W 2–0	Choeikeewong (THA); W 2–0	Han (CHN); L 0–2	Did not advance	3rd place, bronze medalist(s)
Sung Shuo-yun	Women	Bye	Fatmawati (INA); W 2–0	Chua (SGP); W 2–0	Kim (KOR); L 0–2	Did not advance		5
Tung Ciou-tong	Women	Bye	Kim (KOR); L 0–2	Did not advance				17

Doubles

Player	Event	Round of 64	Round of 32	Round of 16	Quarter-finals	Semi-finals	Final / BM	
Player	Event	Opponent score	Opponent score	Opponent score	Opponent score	Opponent score	Opponent score	Rank
Lee Fang-chih; Po Li-wei	Men	Bye	Muyanja / Owinyi (UGA); W 2–0	Mahmoud / Veenstra (NED); W 2–1	Teeraratsakul / Sukphun (THA); W 2–1	He / Zhou (CHN); L 1–2	Did not advance	3rd place, bronze medalist(s)
Lee Chia-hao; Ye Hong-wei	Men	Bye	Chow / Yeung (HKG); W 2–1	Adam / Rossi (FRA); L 0–2	Did not advance			9
Liao Jhuo-fu; Lin Chun-yi	Men	Makkasasithorn / Oupthong (THA); L 0–2	Did not advance					33
Lee Chia-hsin; Teng Chun-hsun	Women	Bye	Phatcharaphisuts / Sukkalad (THA); W 2–0	Ji / Lee (KOR); W 2–1	Xia / Du (CHN); L 0–2	Did not advance		5
Chang Ching-hui; Sung Shuo-yun	Women	Bye	Ngo / Shi (USA); W 2–1	Bauer / Vallet (FRA); W 2–0	Li / Liu (CHN); L 0–2	Did not advance		5
Hsu Wen-chi; Tung Ciou-tong	Women	Hoop / Uprus (EST); W 2–1	Ng / Teoh (MAS); L 0–2	Did not advance				17
Ye Hong-wei; Lee Chia-hsin	Mixed	Bye	Kawashima / Nagasako (JPN); W 2–0	Ren / Liu (CHN); W 2–1	He / Du (CHN); W 2–1	Takiguchi / Uemura (JPN); W 2–0	Lee / Teng (TPE); W 2–0	1st place, gold medalist(s)
Lee Fang-chih; Teng Chun-hsun	Mixed	Bye	Pham / Müller (SUI); W 2–0	Ulhaq / Purnama (INA); W 2–0	Cybulski / Marczak (POL); W 2–0	Jin / Ji (KOR); W 2–0	Ye / Lee (TPE); L 0–2	2nd place, silver medalist(s)
Po Li-wei; Chang Ching-hui	Mixed	Bye	Rambhiya / Panda (IND); L 1–2	Did not advance				17

Team

Player	Event	Group stage			Quarter-finals	Semi-finals	Final / BM	
Player	Event	Opponent score	Opponent score	Opponent score	Opponent score	Opponent score	Opponent score	Rank
Lee Chia-hao; Lee Fang-chih; Liao Jhuo-fu; Lin Chun-yi; Po Li-wei; Ye Hong-wei; Chang Ching-hui; Hsu Wen-chi; Lee Chia-hsin; Sung Shuo-yun; Teng Chun-hsun; Tung Ciou-tong	Team	Estonia (EST); W 5–0	Hong Kong (HKG); W 5–0	Germany (GER); W 5–0	United States (USA); W 3–1	Malaysia (MAS); W 3–0	China (CHN); W 3–2	1st place, gold medalist(s)

== Basketball ==
Summary

Team	Group stage				Quarter-finals	Semi-finals	Final / BM	
Team	Opponent score	Opponent score	Opponent score	Rank	Opponent score	Opponent score	Opponent score	Rank
(Chinese Taipei) Men's team	Lithuania (LTU); L 70–100	Brazil (BRA); L 60–118	China (CHN); W 97–84	3	South Africa (RSA); W 102–64	Poland (POL); L 82–85	Japan (JPN); W 84–82	11
(Chinese Taipei) Women's team	Czech Republic (CZE); W 81–75	Slovakia (SVK); W 69–61	—	1	Hungary (HUN); W 75–72	China (CHN); L 61–83	Finland (FIN); L 49–56	4

Men

=== Preliminary round ===
Qualified for the Final eight
Qualified for the Placement 9th–16th

==== Pool A ====
Team	Pld	W	L	PF	PA	PD	Pts
Brazil	3	3	0	291	217	+74	6
Lithuania	3	2	1	257	221	+36	5
Chinese Taipei	3	1	2	227	302	−75	4
China	3	0	3	230	265	−35	3

29 July 2023
19:30 UTC+8

Boxscore

Lithuania	100–70	Chinese Taipei
Scoring by quarter: 32–18, 19–24, 25–13, 24–15
Pts: Kozys 17; Rebs: Žemaitis 7 Danusevičius 7 Asts: Giedraitis 4		Pts: Lin C-c 20; Rebs: Lin C 6 Asts: Yu 7

Fenghuangshan Sports Park Gymnasium

30 July 2023
15:00 UTC+8

Boxscore

Brazil	118–60	Chinese Taipei
Scoring by quarter: 28–19, 22–13, 31–11, 37–17
Pts: Siewert 20; Rebs: Cardoso Pereira 10; Asts: Pacheco 6		Pts: Gao 15; Rebs: Yu 4 Asts: Yu 5

Sichuan Gymnasium

31 July 2023
19:30 UTC+8

Boxscore

Chinese Taipei	97–84	China
Scoring by quarter: 20–26, 26–22, 30–18, 21–18
Pts: Yu 26; Rebs: Chiu 9 Asts: Yu 11		Pts: Wang 16; Rebs: Wang 10; Asts: Zhang 3

Qingbaijiang Sports Centre Gymnasium

=== Classification round ===
==== Bracket ====
9–15th place quarterfinals
C3	Poland
Bye
A3	Chinese Taipei	102
B4	South Africa	64
D3	Azerbaijan	48
C4	Japan	104
B3	Mongolia	71
A4	China	75

9–12th place semifinals
Poland	85
Chinese Taipei	82
Japan	62
China	84

9th place
Poland	87
China	76
11th place
Chinese Taipei	84
Japan	82

==== 9–15th place quarterfinals ====
2 August 2023
19:30 UTC+8

Boxscore

Chinese Taipei	102–64	South Africa
Scoring by quarter: 25–14, 21–19, 18–16, 38–15
Pts: Gao 19; Rebs: Lu 11; Asts: Yu 8		Pts: Fihla 18; Rebs: Dumbu 8 Asts: Fihla 1 Mametja 1 Chibi 1

Qingshuihe Campus Gymnasium

==== 9–12th place semifinals ====
3 August 2023
15:30 UTC+8

Boxscore

Chinese Taipei	82–85	Poland
Scoring by quarter: 25–26, 19–20, 22–20, 16–19
Pts: Gao 16; Rebs: Lin 11; Asts: Yu 7		Pts: Tomczak 18; Rebs: Kłaczek, Tomczak 7 Asts: Pelczar 3

Sichuan Gymnasium

==== 11th place game ====
6 August 2023
15:00 UTC+8

Boxscore

Chinese Taipei	84–82	Japan
Scoring by quarter: 27–22, 21–17, 18–18, 18–25
Pts: Chang 26; Rebs: Lu 12; Asts: Yu 8		Pts: Tanaka 16; Rebs: Tanaka 9 Asts: Waki, Sato 2

Qingshuihe Campus Gymnasium

== Fencing ==
Men's foil

Athlete	Event	Group stage							Round of 64	Round of 32	Round of 16	Quarter-finals	Semi-finals	Final / BM	
Athlete	Event	Opponent score	Opponent score	Opponent score	Opponent score	Opponent score	Opponent score	Rank	Opponent score	Opponent score	Opponent score	Opponent score	Opponent score	Opponent score	Rank
Chen Yi-tung	Individual	Asranov (UZB); L 4–5	Podralski (POL); L 3–5	Lim (SGP); W 5–2	Snijder (NED); W 5–2	Xiao (USA); L 3–5	Saner (RSA); W 5–3	=31 Q	Lock (SGP); W 15–6	Cheung (HKG); L 8–15	Did not advance				29
Kuo Chun-you	Individual	Loisel (FRA); L 0–5	Ito (JPN); L 1–5	Macedo (POR); W 5–4	Frühauf (HUN); W 5–3	Phon (CAM); W 5–2	Aher (IND); W 5–2	28 Q	Wojtkowiak (POL); L 3–15	Did not advance					35
Chen Chih-chieh	Individual	Martini (ITA); L 4–5	Kim T-h (KOR); L 2–5	Mihályi (HUN); L 1–5	Ng (MAC); W 5–0	Bosnic (AUS); W 5–2	—	41	Frühauf (HUN); L 14–15	Did not advance					43
Yueh Che-hao	Individual	Kim G-m (KOR); L 4–5	Sido (FRA); L 3–5	Nakamura (JPN); L 3–5	Jahagirdar (IND); W 5–2	Cao (CHN); L 1–5	—	52	Did not advance						52
Chen Chih-chieh; Chen Yi-tung; Kuo Chun-you; Yueh Che-hao	Team	Total points: 107						11	—		Hungary (HUN); L 31–45	Did not advance			9

== Gymnastics ==
=== Artistic ===
Men
Team

Athlete	Event	Apparatus						Total	Rank
Athlete	Event	F	PH	R	V	PB	HB	Total	Rank
Tseng Wei-sheng	All-around	~~12.900~~			14.633			27.533	
Lin Guan-yi	All-around	13.200	12.500	13.966	~~13.666~~	~~10.866~~	12.933	77.131	29
Lee Chih-kai	All-around	13.700	14.866	13.000	14.300	13.633	13.800	83.299	8 Q
Yeh Cheng	All-around	13.533	~~12.233~~	~~12.600~~	14.233	13.166	~~10.933~~	76.698	30
Shiao Yu-jan	All-around		14.000 Q	12.633		12.533	12.833	51.999	
Total	All-around	40.433	41.366	39.599	43.166	39.332	39.566	243.462	6

Individual finals

Athlete	Event	Qualification								Final							
Athlete	Event	Apparatus						Total	Rank	Apparatus						Total	Rank
Athlete	Event	F	PH	R	V	PB	HB	Total	Rank	F	PH	R	V	PB	HB	Total	Rank
Lee Chih-kai	All-around	See team results								Withdrawn							
Lee Chih-kai	Pommel horse	—	14.866	—				14.866	2 Q	—	15.500	—				15.500	1st place, gold medalist(s)
Lee Chih-kai	Horizontal bar	—					13.800	13.800	11 Q	—					13.666	13.666	6
Shiao Yu-jan	Pommel horse	—	14.000	—				14.000	6 Q	—	14.933	—				14.933	3rd place, bronze medalist(s)
Tseng Wei-sheng	Vault	—			14.399	—		14.399	2 Q	—			14.366	—		14.366	2nd place, silver medalist(s)

Women
Team

Athlete	Event	Apparatus				Total	Rank
Athlete	Event	V	UB	F	BB	Total	Rank
Wu Sing-fen	All-around	13.033		12.666	11.266	36.965	
Lai Pin-ju	All-around	12.966	11.800	11.733	12.233	48.732	10 Q
Ting Hua-tien	All-around	~~12.000~~	11.933	~~11.666~~	12.133	47.732	13 Q
Lin Yi-chen	All-around	12.766	11.533	11.866	~~11.133~~	47.298	15
Wang Zhi-ti	All-around		~~10.133~~			10.133	
Total	All-around	38.765	35.266	36.265	35.632	74.031	4

Individual

Athlete	Event	Qualification						Final					
Athlete	Event	Apparatus				Total	Rank	Apparatus				Total	Rank
Athlete	Event	V	UB	F	BB	Total	Rank	V	UB	F	BB	Total	Rank
Lai Pin-ju	All-around	See team results						12.766	11.600	11.100	11.933	47.399	13
Lai Pin-ju	Vault	12.566	—			12.566	9 Q	12.033	—			12.033	7
Ting Hua-tien	All-around	See team results						11.966	9.966	12.766	11.900	46.598	15
Wu Sing-feng	Vault	12.716	—			12.716	7 Q	11.500	—			11.500	8
Wu Sing-feng	Balance beam	—			12.666	12.666	8 Q	—			11.400	11.400	8

=== Rhythmic ===
Athlete	Event	Apparatus		Total	Rank
Athlete	Event	5 apps	3+2 apps	Total	Rank
Chan Ting-chen; Lai Hsin-ya; Lo Yu-ching; Peng Fan-xi; Tsai Jui-shan	All-around	27.150	21.850	49.000	4
Chan Ting-chen; Lai Hsin-ya; Lo Yu-ching; Peng Fan-xi; Tsai Jui-shan	5 hoops	26.300	—	26.300	4
Chan Ting-chen; Lai Hsin-ya; Lo Yu-ching; Peng Fan-xi; Tsai Jui-shan	3 ribbons + 2 balls	—	24.750	24.750	3rd place, bronze medalist(s)

== Judo ==
Men

Athlete	Event	Round of 32	Round of 16	Quarter-finals	Semi-finals	Repechage	Final / BM	
Athlete	Event	Opponent score	Opponent score	Opponent score	Opponent score	Opponent score	Opponent score	Rank
Yang Yung-wei	60 kg	Bye	Murrone (GER); W 10–00	Laribi (ALG); W 10–00	Bakhtiyorov (UZB); W 10–00	Bye	Nakamura (JPN); L 00–10	2nd place, silver medalist(s)
Cheng Yen-ming	66 kg	Sánchez (ESP); W 10–00	An (KOR); L 10–00	Did not advance				9
Chen Guan-heng	+100 kg	Bye	Sipőcz (HUN); L 00–10	Did not advance				9

Women

Athlete	Event	Round of 32	Round of 16	Quarter-finals	Semi-finals	Repechage	Final / BM	
Athlete	Event	Opponent score	Opponent score	Opponent score	Opponent score	Opponent score	Opponent score	Rank
Lin Chen-hao	48 kg	Bye	Lei (MAC); W 10–00	Whitebooi (RSA); L 00–10	Oh (KOR); L 00–10	Did not advance		7
Lin Hsu Wan-chu	52 kg	Tanimoto (USA); W 10–00	Gyertyás (HUN); L 00–10	Did not advance				9
Yeh Ya-hui	57 kg	Bye	Kurmanbay (UZB); L 00–10	Did not advance				9
Yuan Pei-chun	63 kg	Antipina (UKR); L 00–10	Did not advance					17
Liao Yu-jung	70 kg	Bye	Gulherme (BRA); W 10–00	Garriga (USA); W 10–00	Bock (GER); L 00–10	Bye	Vetterli (SUI); L 01–10	5
Hsu Wang Shu-huei	78 kg	Heck (NED); L 00–10	Did not advance					17
Chang Ling-fang	+78 kg	Leyton (PER); W 10–00	Dambadarjaa (MGL); L 00–10	Did not advance				9
Chang Ling-fang; Hsu Wang Shu-huei; Liao Yu-jung; Lin Chen-hao; Lin Hsu Wan-chu; Yeh Ya-hui; Yuan Pei-chun	Team	—	China (CHN); L 2–3	Did not advance				9

== Rowing ==
Men

Athlete	Event	Heats		Repechage		Semi-finals		Finals	
Athlete	Event	Time	Rank	Time	Rank	Time	Rank	Time	Rank
Li Ji-hong	Lightweight singles	7:57.10	5 R	7:43.74	3 SA	8:30.81	6 FB	7:47.34	11
Lee Jui-che; Yang Jia-hao	Double	7:14.08	5 R	7:12.42	4 FB	—		7:03.80	9

Women

Athlete	Event	Heats		Repechage		Semi-finals		Finals	
Athlete	Event	Time	Rank	Time	Rank	Time	Rank	Time	Rank
Wen Ching-yang	Singles	8:28.40	2 SA/B	Bye		8:32.95	4 FB	8:26.31	10
Chang Chu; Hsu Yi-hsuan	Double	7:50.22	4 R	7:55.50	5 FB	—		7:46.78	9

== Shooting ==
Men's

Athlete	Event	Qualification		Final	
Athlete	Event	Points	Rank	Points	Rank
Lin Wei-chieh	10 m air pistol	572	17	Did not advance	
Wu Cheng-lun	10 m air pistol	569	20	Did not advance	
Huang Wei-te	10 m air pistol	563	34	Did not advance	
Lin Wei-chieh; Wu Cheng-lun; Huang Wei-te	10 metre team air pistol team	—		1704	6
Lu Shao-chuan	10 metre air rifle	622.1	26	Did not advance	

Women's

Athlete	Event	Qualification		Final	
Athlete	Event	Points	Rank	Points	Rank
Chen Yu-ju	10 m air pistol	569	8	215.0	3rd place, bronze medalist(s)
Liu Heng-yu	10 m air pistol	567	15	Did not advance	
Lin Jou-yu	10 m air pistol	566	18	Did not advance	
Chen Yu-ju; Liu Heng-yu; Lin Jou-yu	10 m air pistol team	—		1702	4
Chen Yu-ju	25 m air pistol	565	19	Did not advance	
Lin Ying-shin	10 m air rifle	628.1	14	Did not advance	
Sung Yu-ting	10 m air rifle	624.7	30	Did not advance	
Chen Chi	10 m air rifle	624.7	31	Did not advanceadvance	
Lin Ying-shin; Sung Yu-ting; Chen Chi	10 m air rifle team	—		1877.5	6
Sung Yu-ting	50 m rifle three positions	1151	38	Did not advance	

Mixed

Athlete	Event	First stage		Second stage		Final	
Athlete	Event	Points	Rank	Points	Rank	Points	Rank
Wu Cheng-lun; Liu Heng-yu	10 m air pistol	568	8 Q	372	8	Did not advance	
Lu Shao-chuan; Lin Ying-shin	10 m air rifle	626.5	9	Did not advance			

== Swimming ==
Men

Athlete	Event	Heat		Semi-finals		Final	
Athlete	Event	Time	Rank	Time	Rank	Time	Rank
Cai Bing-rong	50 metre breaststroke	29.04	33	Did not advance			
Cai Bing-rong	100 metre breaststroke	1:02.81	22	Did not advance			
Cai Bing-rong	200 metre breaststroke	2:16.60	12 Q	2:15.12	10 R	Did not advance	
Chu Chen-kai	50 metre breaststroke	29.61	38	Did not advance			
Chu Chen-kai	100 metre breaststroke	1:04.30	31	Did not advance			
Chu Chen-kai	200 metre breaststroke	2:19.75	20	Did not advance			
Chuang Mu-lun	50 metre freestyle	26.04	37	Did not advance			
Chuang Mu-lun	50 metre backstroke	25.68	17 R	Did not advance			
Chuang Mu-lun	100 metre backstroke	55.53	16 Q	55.16	11	Did not advance	
Chuang Mu-lun	50 metre butterfly	26.04	37	Did not advance			
Huang Guo-lun	800 metre freestyle	8:22.01	15	Did not advance			
Huang Guo-lun	1500 metre freestyle	16:10.78	14	Did not advance			
Wang Hsing-hao	200 metre medley	2:01.30	1 Q	2:02.17	7 Q	2:00.00	2nd place, silver medalist(s)
Wang Hsing-hao	400 metre medley	4:28.14	10 R	—		Did not advance	
Wang Kuan-hung	100 metre butterfly	53.22	9 Q	52.76	11	Did not advance	
Wang Kuan-hung	200 metre butterfly	1:59.11	6 Q	1:56.76	3 Q	1:55.69	2nd place, silver medalist(s)
Cai Bing-rong; Chuang Mu-lun; Wang Hsing-hao; Wang Kuan-hung	4 × 100 metre medley relay	3:43.43	11	—		Did not advance	

Women

Athlete	Event	Heat		Semi-finals		Final	
Athlete	Event	Time	Rank	Time	Rank	Time	Rank
Hsu An	100 metre freestyle	57.43	22	Did not advance			
Hsu An	50 metre backstroke	30.25	22	Did not advance			
Hsu An	100 metre backstroke	1:06.15	26	Did not advance			
Hsu An	100 metre butterfly	1:02.56	24	Did not advance			
Huang Mei-chien	50 metre freestyle	25.49 NR	4 Q	25.42 NR	6 Q	25.49	6
Huang Mei-chien	50 metre butterfly	26.98	11 Q	26.74	11	Did not advance	
Hung Chieh-yu	50 metre breaststroke	32.63	13 Q	32.76	13	Did not advance	
Hung Chieh-yu	100 metre breaststroke	1:11.76	16 Q	1:11.90	16	Did not advance	
Hung Chieh-yu	200 metre breaststroke	2:41.98	18 R	Did not advance			
Jhan Ting-yu	800 metre freestyle	9:51.99	16	—		Did not advance	
Jhan Ting-yu	1500 metre freestyle	18:55.51	15	Did not advance			
Lin Pei-wun	50 metre breaststroke	32.23	10 Q	32.18	10	Did not advance	
Lin Pei-wun	100 metre breaststroke	1:10.57	11 Q	1:10.05	8 Q	1:10.20	7
Yang Yu-ching	200 metre freestyle	2:10.67	26	Did not advance			
Yang Yu-ching	400 metre freestyle	4:35.95	21	—		Did not advance	
Yang Yu-ching	1500 metre freestyle	17:48.49	13	Did not advance			
Yang Yu-hsuan	800 metre freestyle	9:33.58	14	—		Did not advance	
Yang Yu-hsuan	200 metre backstroke	2:23.76	20	Did not advance			
Hsu An; Huang Mei-chien; Lin Pei-wun; Yang Yu-hsuan	4 × 100 metre medley relay	4:21.76	11	—		Did not advance	

Mixed

Athlete	Event	Heat		Final	
Athlete	Event	Time	Rank	Time	Rank
Chuang Mu-lan; Hung Chieh-yu; Wang Kuan-hung; Huang Mei-chien	4 × 100 metre medley relay	3:57.05	9 R	Did not advance	

== Table tennis ==
Men

Athlete	Event	Group stage				First round	Second round	Third round	Quarter-finals	Semi-finals	Final	
Athlete	Event	Opponent score	Opponent score	Opponent score	Rank	Opponent score	Opponent score	Opponent score	Opponent score	Opponent score	Opponent score	Rank
Yang Chia-an	Singles	Man (CHN); L 2–3	Nyachhyon (NEP); W 3–0	—	2 Q	Zelinka (SVK); W 4–3	Toma (ROU); W 4–3	Liu (CHN); W 4–2	Tanaka (JPN); W 4–2	Zhou (CHN); L 0–4	Did not advance	3rd place, bronze medalist(s)
Yang Tzu-yi	Singles	Bye				Cheung (HKG); W 4–1	Hardmeier (SUI); W 4–2	Yokotani (JPN); W 4–0	Zhou (CHN); L 0–4	Did not advance		5
Huang Yan-cheng	Singles	Bye				Do (IND); W 4–2	Tanigaki (JPN); L 1–4	Did not advance				17
Li Hsin-yang	Singles	Fadeev (GER); W 3–0	Nasirdinov (KGZ); W 3–0	Abdullayev (AZE); W 3–0	1 Q	Karin (SUI); W 4–1	Tanaka (JPN); L 2–4	Did not advance				17
Wang Chen-you	Singles	Bye				Kang (KOR); W 4–1	Man (CHN); L 1–4	Did not advance				17
Huang Yan-cheng; Yang Tzu-yi	Doubles	—				Bye	Berner / Vetvik (NOR); W 3–0	Hippler / Hohmeier (GER); L 0–3	Did not advance			9
Li Hsin-yang; Wang Chen-you	Doubles	—				Bye	Jeho / Srivastava (IND); W 3–0	Ho / Kwan (HKG); L 0–3	Did not advance			9
Huang Yan-cheng; Li Hsin-yang; Wang Chen-you; Yang Chia-an; Yang Tzu-yi	Team	Mongolia (MGL); W 3–0	United States (USA); W 3–0	—	1 Q	—		Bye	India (IND); W 3–0	Germany (GER); W 3–2	China (CHN); L 0–3	2nd place, silver medalist(s)

Women

Athlete	Event	Group stage				First round	Second round	Third round	Quarter-finals	Semi-finals	Final	
Athlete	Event	Opponent score	Opponent score	Opponent score	Rank	Opponent score	Opponent score	Opponent score	Opponent score	Opponent score	Opponent score	Rank
Huang Yu-chiao	Singles	Kurono (JPN); L 2–3	Seak (MAC); W 3–1	—	2 Q	Yılmaz (TUR); W 4–2	Rohilla (IND); W 4–1	Baek (KOR); W 4–2	Qian (CHN); L 0–4	Did not advance		5
Chien Tung-chuan	Singles	Bye				Men (NED); W 4–0	Lee (KOR); W 4–0	Plaian (ROU); L 2–4	Did not advance			9
Huang Yu-jie	Singles	Bye				Singeorzan (ROU); W 4–0	Kurono (JPN); L 1–4	Did not advance				17
Huang Yu-wen	Singles	Kammerer (GER); W 3–0	Grigelova (SVK); W 3–1	—	1 Q	Aghamohammadi (IRI); W 4–1	Qian (CHN); L 0–4	Did not advance				17
Li Yu-jhun	Singles	Bye				Goel (IND); W 4–0	Idesawa (JPN); L 0–4	Did not advance				17
Chien Tung-chuan; Huang Yu-jie	Doubles	—				Bye	Men / van Boheemen (NED); W 3–0	Diaconu / Dragoman (ROU); W 3–1	He / Wang (CHN); L 1–4	Did not advance		5
Huang Yu-wen; Li Yu-jhun	Doubles	—				Batmunkh / Munkhbat (MGL); W 3–1	Lee / Soo (HKG); L 1–3	Did not advance				17
Chien Tung-chuan; Huang Yu-chiao; Huang Yu-jie; Huang Yu-wen; Li Yu-jhun	Team	United States (USA); W 3–0	Singapore (SGP); W 3–0	Brazil (BRA); W 3–0	1 Q	—		Bye	Thailand (THA); W 3–2	China (CHN); L 0–3	Did not advance	3rd place, bronze medalist(s)

Mixed

Athlete	Event	First round	Second round	Third round	Quarter-finals	Semi-finals	Final	
Athlete	Event	Opponent score	Opponent score	Opponent score	Opponent score	Opponent score	Opponent score	Rank
Huang Yan-cheng; Li Yu-jhun	Doubles	Bye	Schultz / van Boheemen (NED); W 3–0	Do / Basak (IND); W 3–1	Miyagawa / Idesawa (JPN); L 3–4	Did not advance		5
Yang Tzu-yi; Chien Tung-chen	Doubles	Mladin / Dragoman (ROU); W 3–2	Ho / Doo (HKG); L 1–3	Did not advance				17

== Taekwondo ==
Kyorugi
Men

Athlete	Event	Round of 32	Round of 16	Quarter-finals	Semi-finals	Final	
Athlete	Event	Opponent score	Opponent score	Opponent score	Opponent score	Opponent score	Rank
Chen Chia-le	54 kg	Bye	Otajonov (UZB); L 0–2	Did not advance			9
Huang Yu-xiang	58 kg	Ayaz (AUS); W 2–0	Yodrak (THA); L 0–2	Did not advance			9
Hsu Hao-yu	63 kg	Bye	Maeda (JPN); W 2–0	Kwak (USA); W 2–0	Reçber (TUR); L 1–2	Did not advance	3rd place, bronze medalist(s)
Chiu Yi-jui	68 kg	Mussakhan (KAZ); W 2–0	Mammadli (AZE); W 2–0	Diniz (BRA); W 2–0	Kavurat (TUR); W 2–0	Lee (KOR); L 0–2	2nd place, silver medalist(s)
Chiu Yi-jui	74 kg	Polat (TUR); L 0–2	Did not advance				17
Chen Jun-wei	80 kg	Fehintola (NGR); W 2–0	Zhang (CHN); L 0–2	Did not advance			9
Jian Jun-ren	87 kg	Bye	Salimi (IRI); L 0–2	Did not advance			9
Jung Jiun-jie	68 kg	—	Alahmed (QAT); W 2–0	Nadalianjouybari (IRI); W 2–1	Harbar (UKR); W 2–0	Ateşli (TUR); L 0–2	2nd place, silver medalist(s)
Chen Jun-wei; Chiu Yi-jui; Hsu Hao-yu; Jung Jiun-jie	Team	—	Malaysia (MAS); W 1–0	Kazakhstan (KAZ); L 0–1	Did not advance		5

Women

Athlete	Event	Round of 32	Round of 16	Quarter-finals	Semi-finals	Final	
Athlete	Event	Opponent score	Opponent score	Opponent score	Opponent score	Opponent score	Rank
Huang Ying-hsuan	46 kg	Bye	Nasiridarounkola (IRI); W 2–1	Prikasih (INA); W 2–0	Akbarova (AZE); W 2–0	Bakisheva (KAZ); L 1–2	2nd place, silver medalist(s)
Shih Yun-chen	49 kg	Bye	Kong (MAC); W 2–0	Kisskalt (GER); L 0–2	Did not advance		5
Su Po-ya	53 kg	Bye	Folgmann (GER); W 2–0	Hronová (CZE); W 2–1	Pérez (ESP); W 2–0	Kiyanichandeh (IRI); L 0–2	2nd place, silver medalist(s)
Lo Chia-ling	57 kg	Bye	Harnsujin (THA); W 2–1	Asaseh (IRI); W 2–0	Yang (CHN); W 2–0	Kim (KOR); L 0–2	2nd place, silver medalist(s)
Chiu Chao-hsuan	62 kg	Montemuiño (ESP); W 2–0	Štolbová (CZE); W 2–1	Mehnana (FRA); W 2–0	Tongchan (THA); L 0–2	Did not advance	3rd place, bronze medalist(s)
Lin Chieh-yu	67 kg	Bye	Ali (PAK); W 2–0	Chaari (BEL); L 0–2	Did not advance		5
Cai Nian-en	73 kg	Bye	Kiefer (AUS); W 2–0	Zhou (CHN); L 0–2	Did not advance		5
Ma Ting-hsia	+73 kg	—	Pirola (BRA); W 2–0	Viana (USA); W 2–0	Xu (CHN); L 0–2	Did not advance	3rd place, bronze medalist(s)
Chiu Shao-hsuan; Lo Chia-ling; Ma Ting-hsia; Su Po-ya	Team	—	Bye	Kazakhstan (KAZ); L 0–1	Did not advance		5

Poomsae

Athlete	Event	Preliminary		Semi-finals		Final	
Athlete	Event	Score	Rank	Score	Rank	Score	Rank
Huang Yi-cheng	Men's individual	7.040	3 Q	6.930	11	Did not advance	
Huang Ching-tung; Lin Yu-han; Ma Yun-zhong	Men's team	—		7.100	2 Q	6.620	8
Hu Tzu-hsuan	Women's individual	6.720	5 Q	6.780	6 Q	6.380	2nd place, silver medalist(s)
Chen Hsin-ya; Chien Shiang-ling; Kuo Yen-yu	Women's team	—		7.260	3 Q	6.490	5
Hsu Yu-tse; Huang Pin-chieh	Mixed pair	7.000	3 Q	6.770	6 Q	6.910	3rd place, bronze medalist(s)

== Tennis ==
Men

Athlete	Event	First round	Second round	Third round	Quarter-finals	Semi-finals	Final	
Athlete	Event	Opponent score	Opponent score	Opponent score	Opponent score	Opponent score	Opponent score	Rank
Huang Tsung-hao	Singles	Bye	Cloud (USA); W 2–0	Jermar (CZE); W 2–0	Jang (KOR); L 0–2	Did not advance		5
Ho Chen-jui	Singles	Bye	Chu (KOR); W 2–0	de Amorim Rocha (POR); L 0–2	Did not advance			9
Hsu Yu-hsiou; Huang Tsung-hao	Doubles	—	Bye	Cronje / Fogle (RSA); W 2–0	de Amorim Rocha / Reis (POR); W 2–0	Hazawa / Taguchi (JPN); W 2–0	Jermar / Sklenka (CZE); W 2–0	1st place, gold medalist(s)

Women

Athlete	Event	First round	Second round	Third round	Quarter-finals	Semi-finals	Final	
Athlete	Event	Opponent score	Opponent score	Opponent score	Opponent score	Opponent score	Opponent score	Rank
Yang Ya-yi	Singles	Bye	Čisovská (SVK); W 2–0	Hance (USA); W 2–0	Kim (KOR); W 2–0	Robbe (FRA); W 2–0	Guo (CHN); L 1–2	2nd place, silver medalist(s)
Liang En-shuo	Singles	Bye	Valikhanova (UZB); W 2–0	Chilakalapudi (IND); W 2–0	Karunaratne (HKG); W 2–0	Guo (CHN); L 0–2	Did not advance	3rd place, bronze medalist(s)
Liang En-shuo; Wu Fang-hsien	Doubles	—	Bye	Kusumawati / Wira (INA); W 2–0	Dormet / Robbe (FRA); W 2–0	Hance / Wagle (USA); W 2–0	Guo / Jiang (CHN); W 2–0	1st place, gold medalist(s)

Mixed

Athlete	Event	First round	Second round	Quarter-finals	Semi-finals	Final	
Athlete	Event	Opponent score	Opponent score	Opponent score	Opponent score	Opponent score	Rank
Hsu Yu-hsiou; Wu Fang-hsien	Doubles	Bye	Kurniawan / Wira (INA); W 2–0	Clark / Elise Wagle (USA); W 2–0	Fujiwara / Rioux (JPN); W 2–0	Jin / Tang (CHN); W 2–1	1st place, gold medalist(s)

Team

Event	Discipline	Athlete	Result	Points	Total	Rank
Men	Singles	Huang Tsung-hao	Quarter-finalists	10	125	1st place, gold medalist(s)
Men	Singles	Ho Chen-jui	4th Round	5	125	1st place, gold medalist(s)
Men	Doubles	Hsu Yu-hsiou; Huang Tsung-hao	Champion	60	125	1st place, gold medalist(s)
Men	Mixed	Hsu Yu-hsiou; Wu Fang-hsien	Champion	60	125	1st place, gold medalist(s)
Women	Singles	Yang Ya-yi	Runner-up	40	180	1st place, gold medalist(s)
Women	Singles	Liang En-shuo	Semi-finalists	20	180	1st place, gold medalist(s)
Women	Doubles	Liang En-shuo; Wu Fang-hsien	Champion	60	180	1st place, gold medalist(s)
Women	Mixed	Hsu Yu-hsiou; Wu Fang-hsien	Champion	60	180	1st place, gold medalist(s)

== Volleyball ==
Summary

Team	Group stage				Quarter-finals	Semi-finals	Final / BM	
Team	Opponent score	Opponent score	Opponent score	Rank	Opponent score	Opponent score	Opponent score	Rank
(Chinese Taipei) Men's team	Italy (ITA); L 0–3	Brazil (BRA); W 3–0	Germany (GER); L 3–0	3	Czech Republic (CZE); W 3–2	South Korea (KOR); L 2–3	Japan (JPN); L 0–3	12
(Chinese Taipei) Women's team	Poland (POL); L 1–3	Brazil (BRA); L 0–3	—	3	—	India (IND); W 3–0	Argentina (ARG); W 3–0	9

== Wushu ==
Men
Taolu

Athlete	Event	Result	Rank
Sun Chia-hung	Taijijian	9.710	2nd place, silver medalist(s)
Sun Chia-hung	Taijiquan	9.693	1st place, gold medalist(s)
Chen Yue-xi	Changquan	9.706	3rd place, bronze medalist(s)
Chen Yue-xi	Daoshu	9.600	6

Sanda

Athlete	Event	Round of 16	Quarter-finals	Semi-finals	Final	
Athlete	Event	Opponent score	Opponent score	Opponent score	Opponent score	Rank
Hong Yu-zhe	52 kg	—	Demirci (TUR); L WPD	Did not advance		5
Hou Chih-han	60 kg	Guitara (INA); L 0–2	Did not advance			9
Zhang Huan-yi	70 kg	Brahmana (INA); L 1–2	Did not advance			9

Women
Taolu

Athlete	Event	Result	Rank
Lin Chien-hsi	Changquan	9.453	3rd place, bronze medalist(s)
Lin Chien-hsi	Jainshu	9.543	6
Liu Pei-hsun	Taijijian	9.596	7
Liu Pei-hsun	Taijiquan	9.606	4

Sanda

Athlete	Event	Quarter-finals	Semi-finals	Final	
Athlete	Event	Opponent score	Opponent score	Opponent score	Rank
Chen Si-yun	52 kg	Florentina (INA); L WPD	Did not advance		5
