= Tennis at the 2021 Summer World University Games – Women's team =

Women's team at the 2021 Summer World University Games
- Venue: Sichuan International Tennis Centre
- Location: Chengdu, China
- Dates: 29 July 2023 – 6 August 2023

Medalists
gold medal	Chinese Taipei (TPE)
silver medal	China (CHN)
bronze medal	Japan (JPN)

Women's team
- Tennis at the 2021 Summer World University Games

Events
Singles	men	women
Doubles	men	women	mixed
Team	men	women
← 2019 ·	Summer World University Games	· 2023 →

The women's team classification tennis event at the 2021 Summer World University Games was held between 29 July and 6 August 2021 at the Sichuan International Tennis Centre in Chengdu, China.

== Ranking system ==
The following chart shows the points earned on each ranking in each event.

Rank	Points	
Rank	Singles	Doubles
1st place, gold medalist(s)	60	
2nd place, silver medalist(s)	40	
3rd place, bronze medalist(s)	20	
5/8	10	
9/16	5	—

If the results are same, the rank will be judged in the following steps:

- Medal counts
- Gold medal counts
- Best rank at the singles event.

== Results ==
=== Individual ranking ===
Placing	WS		WD		XD	
Placing	Athlete	Points	Athlete	Points	Athlete	Points
1st place, gold medalist(s)	Guo Hanyu (CHN)	60	Liang En-shuo (TPE); Wu Fang-hsien (TPE)	60	Hsu Yu-hsiou (TPE); Wu Fang-hsien (TPE)	60
2nd place, silver medalist(s)	Yang Ya-yi (TPE)	40	Guo Hanyu (CHN); Jiang Xinyu (CHN)	40	Jin Yuquan (CHN); Tang Qianhui (CHN)	40
3rd place, bronze medalist(s)	Alice Robbe (FRA)	20	Kimberly Hance (USA); Elisa Wagle (USA)	20	Tomoya Fujiwara (JPN); Lisa Marie Rioux (JPN)	20
3rd place, bronze medalist(s)	Liang En-shuo (TPE)	20	Misaki Matsuda (JPN); Ikumi Yamazaki (JPN)	20	Wong Chak Lam (HKG); Wong Hong Yi (HKG)	20
5/8	Anchisa Chanta (THA)	10	Luna Dormet (FRA); Alice Robbe (FRA)	10	Warren Clark (USA); Elise Wagle (USA)	10
5/8	Kim Da-bin (KOR)	10	Punnin Kovapitukted (THA); Lanlana Tararudee (THA)	10	Congsup Congcar (THA); Yatawee Chimcham (THA)	10
5/8	Misaki Matsuda (JPN)	10	Romana Čisovská (SVK); Lenka Stará (SVK)	10	Adrien Gobat (FRA); Alice Robbe (FRA)	10
5/8	Adithya Karunaratne (HKG)	10	Leong Kwan Tung (HKG); Wong Hong Yi (HKG)	10	Joshua Charlton (AUS); Amy Stevens (AUS)	10
9/16	Zheng Wushuang (CHN)	5	—			
9/16	Ikumi Yamazaki (JPN)	5	—			
9/16	Kimberly Hance (USA)	5	—			
9/16	Wong Hong Yi (HKG)	5	—			
9/16	Laniana Tararudee (THA)	5	—			
9/16	Taylor Johnson (USA)	5	—			
9/16	Lee Eun-hye (KOR)	5	—			
9/16	Sravya Chilakalapudi (IND)	5	—			

=== Rankings by nation ===
Rank	Nation	Women's singles				Women's doubles		Mixed doubles		Total	Medal		
Rank	Nation	Athlete	Points	Athlete	Points	Athlete	Points	Athlete	Points	Total	1st place, gold medalist(s)	2nd place, silver medalist(s)	3rd place, bronze medalist(s)
1st place, gold medalist(s)	Chinese Taipei (TPE)	Yang Ya-yi	40	Liang En-shuo	20	Liang En-shuo; Wu Fang-hsien	60	Hsu Yu-hsiou; Wu Fang-hsien	60	180	2	1	1
2nd place, silver medalist(s)	China (CHN)	Guo Hanyu	60	Zheng Wushuang	5	Guo Hanyu; Jiang Xinyu	40	Jin Yuquan; Tang Qianhui	40	145	1	2	
3rd place, bronze medalist(s)	Japan (JPN)	Misaki Matsuda	10	Ikumi Yamazaki	5	Misaki Matsuda; Ikumi Yamazaki	20	Tomoya Fujiwara; Lisa Marie Rioux	20	55			2
4	Hong Kong (HKG)	Adithya Karunaratne	10	Wong Hong Yi	5	Leong Kwan Tung; Wong Hong Yi	10	Wong Chak Lam; Wong Hong Yi	20	45			1
5	France (FRA)	Alice Robbe	20			Luna Dormet; Alice Robbe	10	Adrien Gobat; Alice Robbe	10	40			1
6	United States (USA)	Kimberly Hance	5	Taylor Johnson	5	Kimberly Hance; Elisa Wagle	20	Warren Clark; Elise Wagle	10	40			1
7	Thailand (THA)	Anchisa Chanta	10	Laniana Tararudee	5	Punnin Kovapitukted; Laniana Tararudee	10	Congsup Congcar; Yatawee Chimcham	10	35			
8	South Korea (KOR)	Kim Da-bin	10	Lee Eun-hye	5					15			
9	Australia (AUS)							Joshua Charlton; Amy Stevens	10	10			
9	Slovakia (SVK)					Romana Čisovská; Lenka Stará	10			10			
11	India (IND)	Sravya Chilakalapudi	5							5			
