= Indonesia at the 2021 Summer World University Games =

- Flag of Indonesia
- IOC code: INA
- National federation: Indonesia University Sports Council

in Chengdu, China 28 July 2023 – 8 August 2023
- Competitors: 51 (25 men and 26 women) in 8 sports
- Flag bearer: Edgar Xavier Marvelo
- Medals Ranked 15th: Gold 4 Silver 3 Bronze 0 Total 7

Summer World University Games appearances
- 1959; 1961; 1963; 1965; 1967; 1970; 1973; 1975; 1977; 1979; 1981; 1983; 1985; 1987; 1989; 1991; 1993; 1995; 1997; 1999; 2001; 2003; 2005; 2007; 2009; 2011; 2013; 2015; 2017; 2019; 2021; 2025; 2027

Indonesia is competing at the 2021 Summer World University Games in Chengdu, China, from 28 July to 8 August 2023 that was postponed due to the COVID-19 pandemic.

== Competitors ==
The following is the list of competitors in the Games.

Sport	Men	Women	Total
Athletics	4	5	9
Badminton	5	5	10
Judo	1	2	3
Rowing	1	1	2
Swimming	5	4	9
Taekwondo	2	4	6
Tennis	2	2	4
Wushu	5	3	8
Total	25	26	51

== Medal summary ==
=== Medal by sports ===
Medals by sport
Sport	1st place, gold medalist(s)	2nd place, silver medalist(s)	3rd place, bronze medalist(s)	Total
Wushu	4	3	0	2
Total	4	3	0	7

=== Medalists ===
Medal	Name	Sport	Event	Date
Gold	Nandhira Mauriskha	Wushu	Women's changquan	July 29
Gold	Nandhira Mauriskha	Wushu	Women's jianshu	July 30
Gold	Laksmana Pandu Pratama	Wushu	Men's 52 kg	August 3
Gold	Tharisa Dea Florentina	Wushu	Women's 52 kg	August 3
Silver	Edgar Xavier Marvelo	Wushu	Men's changquan	July 29
Silver	Edgar Xavier Marvelo	Wushu	Men's daoshu	July 31
Silver	Bintang Reindra Nada Guitara	Wushu	Men's 60 kg	August 3

== Tennis ==
Athlete	Event	Round of 64	Round of 32	Round of 16	Quarter-finals	Semi-finals	Final	
Athlete	Event	Opponent score	Opponent score	Opponent score	Opponent score	Opponent score	Opponent score	Rank
Arian Rangga Desvianto	Men's singles	Ng K L (HKG); L 2–6, 3–6	Did not advance					
Arian Rangga Desvianto	Men's singles consolation	—N/a	Bye	L Bathrinath (IND); L 1–6, 2–6	Did not advance			
Lucky Candra Kurniawan	Men's singles	Chu S-h (KOR); L 2–6, 1–6	Did not advance					
Lucky Candra Kurniawan	Men's singles consolation	—N/a	A Marinho (BRA); W 6–0, 6–0	K Hans (IND); L 1–6, 6–7(5)	Did not advance			
Fadona Titalyana Kusumawati	Women's singles	Bye	K Hance (USA); L 4–6, 0–6	Did not advance				
Jessica Christa Wira	Women's singles	N Kněžková (CZE); L 1–6, 2–6	Did not advance					
Jessica Christa Wira	Women's singles consolation	—N/a		J Nakayenga (UGA); W 6–1, 6–3	P Ingale (IND); L 5–7, 4–6	Did not advance		
Arian Rangga Desvianto / Lucky Candra Kurniawan	Men's doubles	—N/a	Bye	Jermář / Sklenka (CZE); L 6–7(6), 6–2, [7-10]	Did not advance			
Fadona Titalyana Kusumawati / Jessica Christa Wira	Women's doubles	—N/a	Athieno / Nakayenga (UGA); W 6–0, 6–0	Liang / Wu (TPE); L 0–6, 0–6	Did not advance			
Lucky Candra Kurniawan / Jessica Christa Wira	Mixed doubles	—N/a	Fogle / de Kock (RSA); W 7–5, 6–1	Hsu / Wu (TPE); L 3–6, 3–6	Did not advance			

== Wushu ==
Taolu

Athlete	Event	Result	Rank
Edgar Xavier Marvelo	Men's changquan	9.716	2nd place, silver medalist(s)
Edgar Xavier Marvelo	Men's daoshu	9.703	2nd place, silver medalist(s)
Nicholas Fang	Men's taijiquan	9.716	8
Nicholas Fang	Men's taijijian	9.483	6
Nandhira Mauriskha	Women's changquan	9.600	1st place, gold medalist(s)
Nandhira Mauriskha	Women's jianshu	9.660	1st place, gold medalist(s)
Zefanya Adelia Sidharta	Women's taijiquan	9.603	5
Zefanya Adelia Sidharta	Women's taijijian	9.650	4

Sanda

Athlete	Event	Round of 16	Quarter-finals	Semi-finals	Final	
Athlete	Event	Opponent score	Opponent score	Opponent score	Opponent score	Rank
Laksmana Pandu Pratama	Men's 52 kg	—N/a	S Abdurashitov (UZB); W 2–0	A Pangchai (THA); W 2–0	M Demirci (TUR); W 2–0	1st place, gold medalist(s)
Bintang Reindra Nada Guitara	Men's 60 kg	Hou C-h (TPE); W 2–0	A Pengthai (THA); W 2–0	S Panahigelehkolaei (IRI); W 2–0	Ma Y (CHN); L 0–2	2nd place, silver medalist(s)
Harry Brahmana	Men's 70 kg	Zhang H-y (TPE); W 2–0	Song G-c (KOR); L 0–2	Did not advance		
Tharisa Dea Florentina	Women's 52 kg	—N/a	Chen S-y (TPE); W WPD	H Türksoy Hançer (TUR); W 2–0	M B V Ruggieri (FRA); W 2–0	1st place, gold medalist(s)
