= Archery at the 2021 Summer World University Games – Mixed team recurve =

Mixed team recurve at the 2021 Summer World University Games
- Venue: Shuangliu Modern Pentathlon Centre
- Location: Chengdu, China
- Dates: 27 – 31 July 2023
- Competitors: 42 from 21 nations

Medalists
gold medal	Tetsuya Aoshima; Waka Sonoda	Japan
silver medal	Seo Min-gi; Lee Ga-hyun	South Korea
bronze medal	Matteo Milisari; Aiko Rolando	Italy

The mixed team recurve archery competition at the 2021 Summer World University Games was held in the Shuangliu Modern Pentathlon Centre, Chengdu, China between July 27 and 31.

== Records ==
Prior to the competition, the world and Universiade records were as follows.

- 144 arrows qualification round

Category	Team	Athlete	Score	Record	Date	Place	Event
World record	South Korea	Lee Woo-seok	696	1388	10 June 2019	's-Hertogenbosch, Netherlands	2019 World Archery Championships
World record	South Korea	Kang Chae-young	692	1388	10 June 2019	's-Hertogenbosch, Netherlands	2019 World Archery Championships
Universiade record	South Korea (KOR)	Lee Seung-yun	693	1379	4 July 2015	Gwangju, South Korea	2015 Summer Universiade
Universiade record	South Korea (KOR)	Ki Bo-bae	686	1379	4 July 2015	Gwangju, South Korea	2015 Summer Universiade

== Qualification round ==
The ranking round took place on 27 July 2023 to determine the seeding for the elimination rounds. It consisted of top archers' results in individual event, with a maximum score of 1440.

Rank	Team	Archer	Individual			Team		
Rank	Team	Archer	Score	10s	Xs	Total	10s	Xs
1	South Korea (KOR)	Seo Min-gi (KOR)	683	41	14	1364	79	32
1	South Korea (KOR)	Lee Ga-hyun (KOR)	681	38	18	1364	79	32
2	China (CHN)	Feng Hao (CHN)	675	34	13	1343	65	24
2	China (CHN)	Wang Limin (CHN)	668	31	11	1343	65	24
3	Japan (JPN)	Tetsuya Aoshima (JPN)	667	32	9	1332	59	20
3	Japan (JPN)	Waka Sonoda (JPN)	665	27	11	1332	59	20
4	France (FRA)	Thomas Chirault (FRA)	669	27	11	1323	56	23
4	France (FRA)	Mélanie Gaubil (FRA)	654	29	12	1323	56	23
5	Chinese Taipei (TPE)	Kuo Yu-cheng (TPE)	656	30	11	1309	54	15
5	Chinese Taipei (TPE)	Peng Chia-mao (TPE)	653	24	4	1309	54	15
6	India (IND)	Yashdeep Bhoge (IND)	674	35	10	1303	54	15
6	India (IND)	Sangeeta (IND)	629	19	5	1303	54	15
7	Italy (ITA)	Matteo Bilisari (ITA)	667	27	14	1303	45	16
7	Italy (ITA)	Aiko Rolando (ITA)	636	18	2	1303	45	16
8	Iran (IRI)	Reza Shabani (IRI)	656	22	3	1295	46	12
8	Iran (IRI)	Mobina Fallah (IRI)	639	24	9	1295	46	12
9	Turkey (TUR)	Samet Ak (TUR)	660	28	12	1289	44	16
9	Turkey (TUR)	Zeynep Köse (TUR)	629	16	4	1289	44	16
10	Kazakhstan (KAZ)	Mansur Alimbayev (KAZ)	648	20	7	1282	41	12
10	Kazakhstan (KAZ)	Diana Tursunbek (KAZ)	634	21	5	1282	41	12
11	Hong Kong (HKG)	Kwok Yin Chai (HKG)	675	31	12	1272	37	13
11	Hong Kong (HKG)	Poon Wei Tsing (HKG)	597	6	1	1272	37	13
12	Poland (POL)	Maksymilian Osuch (POL)	651	21	8	1269	35	11
12	Poland (POL)	Sylwia Zyzańska (POL)	618	14	3	1269	35	11
13	Germany (GER)	Jonathan Vetter (GER)	629	21	8	1259	36	13
13	Germany (GER)	Johanna Klinger (GER)	630	15	5	1259	36	13
14	Malaysia (MAS)	Mohd Rizuwan (MAS)	636	16	5	1250	25	8
14	Malaysia (MAS)	Nur Afisa Abdul Halil (MAS)	614	9	3	1250	25	8
15	Ukraine (UKR)	Stefan Kostyk (UKR)	623	21	7	1235	37	12
15	Ukraine (UKR)	Solomiya Trapeznikova (UKR)	612	16	5	1235	37	12
16	United States (USA)	Christopher Austin (USA)	607	14	4	1233	31	11
16	United States (USA)	Judith Gottlieb (USA)	626	17	7	1233	31	11
17	Australia (AUS)	Markus Kuhrau (AUS)	609	15	7	1219	29	12
17	Australia (AUS)	Imogen Grzemski (AUS)	610	14	5	1219	29	12
18	Moldova (MDA)	Dan Olaru (MDA)	658	23	10	1187	31	14
18	Moldova (MDA)	Nadejda Celan (MDA)	529	8	4	1187	31	14
19	Mongolia (MGL)	Tsenguun Tsogtbayar (MGL)	652	26	9	1165	31	9
19	Mongolia (MGL)	Anudari Ganbayar (MGL)	513	5	0	1165	31	9
20	Switzerland (SUI)	Félix Möckli (SUI)	624	17	8	1153	22	9
20	Switzerland (SUI)	Olga Fusek (SUI)	529	5	1	1153	22	9
21	Azerbaijan (AZE)	Ahmad Huseynov (AZE)	585	15	1	1150	21	5
21	Azerbaijan (AZE)	Nazrin Zamanova (AZE)	565	6	4	1150	21	5

== Elimination round ==
The results are as below:

=== Section 1 ===
1/24 elimination round
17	Australia (AUS)	6	36	32	34	35
16	United States (USA)	2	33	30	35	33

Round of 32
1	South Korea (KOR)	6	33	36	37	39
17	Australia (AUS)	2	36	34	34	24
9	Turkey (TUR)	1	33	37	35
8	Iran (IRI)	5	36	38	35

Round of 16
1	South Korea (KOR)	6	34	39	38
8	Iran (IRI)	0	30	35	35

=== Section 2 ===
1/24 elimination round
21	Azerbaijan (AZE)	0	19	30	31
12	Poland (POL)	6	36	34	35
13	Germany (GER)	6	33	35	32
20	Switzerland (SUI)	0	29	31	30

Round of 32
5	Chinese Taipei (TPE)	5	36	35	33
12	Poland (POL)	1	35	35	32
13	Germany (GER)	3	37	37	31	31
4	France (FRA)	5	34	37	34	33

Round of 16
5	Chinese Taipei (TPE)	1	30	37	32
4	France (FRA)	5	39	37	37

=== Section 3 ===
1/24 elimination round
19	Mongolia (MGL)	5	35	37	33	17	16
14	Malaysia (MAS)	4	31	34	36	33	15

Round of 32
3	Japan (JPN)	6	33	39	37
19	Mongolia (MGL)	0	27	29	24
11	Hong Kong (HKG)	2	37	35	33	28
6	India (IND)	6	25	38	35	31

Round of 16
3	Japan (JPN)	6	35	39	35
6	India (IND)	0	31	33	34

=== Section 4 ===
1/24 elimination round
15	Ukraine (UKR)	3	29	32	35	35
18	Moldova (MDA)	5	35	35	33	35

Round of 32
7	Italy (ITA)	6	35	34	35	37
10	Kazakhstan (KAZ)	2	36	33	34	33
18	Moldova (MDA)	2	33	34	32	33
2	China (CHN)	6	37	33	34	37

Round of 16
7	Italy (ITA)	5	36	34	36	33	20
2	China (CHN)	4	32	32	37	38	17

=== Finals ===
Semi-finals
1	South Korea (KOR)	6	38	38	38
4	France (FRA)	0	37	35	35
3	Japan (JPN)	6	36	35	36
7	Italy (ITA)	0	33	32	33

Gold medal match
1	South Korea (KOR)	3	38	34	36	37
3	Japan (JPN)	5	36	36	37	37
Bronze medal match
4	France (FRA)	4	35	36	37	38	17
7	Italy (ITA)	5	36	35	38	37	18
