= Archery at the 2021 Summer World University Games – Women's individual recurve =

Women's individual recurve at the 2021 Summer World University Games
- Venue: Shuangliu Modern Pentathlon Centre
- Location: Chengdu, China
- Dates: 27 – 31 July 2023
- Competitors: 50 from 24 nations

Medalists
gold medal	Choi Mi-sun	South Korea
silver medal	Diana Tursunbek	Kazakhstan
bronze medal	Peng Chia-mao	Chinese Taipei

The women's individual recurve archery competition at the 2021 Summer World University Games was held in the Shuangliu Modern Pentathlon Centre, Chengdu, China between July 27 and 31.

== Records ==
Prior to the competition, the world and Universiade records were as follows.

- 72 arrows ranking round

Category	Athlete	Record	Date	Place	Event
World record	(South Korea) Kang Chae-young	692	10 June 2019	's-Hertogenbosch, Netherlands	2019 World Archery Championships
Universiade record	(South Korea) Choi Mi-sun	687	20 August 2017	Taipei, Taiwan	2017 Summer Universiade

== Ranking round ==
Qualified for Round of 32
Qualified for 1/24 Round

The ranking round took place on 27 July 2023 to determine the seeding for the elimination rounds. It consisted of two rounds of 36 arrows, with a maximum score of 720.

Rank	Archer	1st Half	2nd Half	10s	Xs	Score	Notes
1	Lee Ga-hyun (KOR)	337	344	38	18	681	
2	Kim So-hee (KOR)	338	330	32	16	668	
3	Wang Limin (CHN)	335	333	31	11	668	
4	Waka Sonoda (JPN)	331	334	27	11	665	
5	Choi Mi-sun (KOR)	335	328	28	12	663	
6	Mélanie Gaubil (FRA)	325	329	29	12	654	
7	Peng Chia-mao (TPE)	319	334	24	4	653	
8	Zhou Danyan (CHN)	319	331	26	11	650	
9	Li Tsai-chi (TPE)	323	326	24	6	649	
10	Li Xinxin (CHN)	320	325	20	5	645	
11	Aziliz Ramel (FRA)	322	323	20	1	645	
12	Mobina Fallah (IRI)	327	312	24	9	639	
13	Aiko Rolando (ITA)	312	324	18	2	636	
14	Diana Tursunbek (KAZ)	312	322	21	5	634	
15	Kanae Sueki (JPN)	314	318	21	4	632	
16	Johanna Klinger (GER)	308	322	15	5	630	
17	Sangeeta Sangeeta (IND)	306	323	19	5	629	
18	Zeynep Köse (TUR)	314	315	16	4	629	
19	Reeta Sawaiyan (IND)	312	317	15	6	629	
20	Judith Gottlieb (USA)	312	314	17	7	626	
21	Sui Yun-ching (TPE)	308	317	15	2	625	
22	Lida Nanou (GRE)	309	314	16	6	623	
23	Katherine Wu (USA)	302	318	17	3	620	
24	Anaëlle Florent (FRA)	301	317	18	6	618	
25	Sylwia Zyzańska (POL)	310	308	14	3	618	
26	Rena Mayumi (JPN)	306	311	9	0	617	
27	Nur Afisa Abdul Halil (MAS)	295	319	9	3	614	
28	Solomiya Trapeznikova (UKR)	314	298	16	5	612	
29	Klaudia Plaza (POL)	307	305	12	3	612	
30	Olha Shubkina (UKR)	304	306	15	3	610	
31	Imogen Grzemski (AUS)	296	314	14	5	610	
32	Tanisha Verma (IND)	305	293	12	5	598	
33	Yelizaveta Avdeyeva (KAZ)	286	312	12	5	598	
34	Natalie Howell (USA)	303	295	10	3	598	
35	Poon Wei Tsing (HKG)	289	308	6	1	597	
36	Nicole Degani (ITA)	296	300	14	6	596	
37	Madina Zaemova (KAZ)	293	303	6	1	596	
38	Mary-Ann Tempelman (NED)	289	300	8	4	589	
39	Natalie Soo (SGP)	273	315	14	2	588	
40	Nur Ain Ayuni Fozi (MAS)	290	298	8	3	588	
41	Poon Yuk Hei (HKG)	269	303	6	1	572	
42	Isable Tang (SGP)	284	285	9	4	569	
43	Nazrin Zamanova (AZE)	278	287	6	4	565	
44	Sara Noceti (ITA)	275	284	5	1	559	
45	Nuramalia Haneesha Mazlan (MAS)	287	267	8	2	554	
46	Kamila Napłoszek (POL)	267	282	7	2	549	
47	Nadejda Celan (MDA)	252	277	8	4	529	
48	Olga Fusek (SUI)	258	271	5	1	529	
49	Anudari Ganbayar (MGL)	262	251	5	0	513	
50	Misheel Altansoyombo (MGL)	260	251	2	1	511	

== Elimination round ==
The results are as below.

=== Section 1 ===
1/24 elimination round
33	Y Avdeyeva (KAZ)	2	26	26	24	21
32	T Verma (IND)	6	28	28	23	28
17	S.Sangeeta (IND)	6	26	28	27
48	O Fusek (SUI)	0	20	16	21
49	A Ganbayar (MGL)	0	17	13	22
16	J Klinger (GER)	6	27	26	25

Round of 32
1	Lee G-h (KOR)	6	29	24	27	28	28^{9}
T Verma (IND)	5	26	29	27	29	27^{8}
17	Sangeeta (IND)	7	26	24	26	28	25
16	J Klinger (GER)	3	27	24	25	25	24

Round of 16
1	Lee G-h (KOR)	6	27	28	28
17	S.Sangeeta (IND)	0	26	26	24

=== Section 2 ===
1/24 elimination round
41	Poon Y H (HKG)	3	26	29	23	22	24
24	A Florent (FRA)	7	26	28	24	26	25
25	S Zyzańska (POL)	4	21	25	25	23	21
40	Nur Ain Ayuni F (MAS)	6	21	25	18	26	28

Round of 32
9	Li T-c (TPE)	6	27	29	24
24	A Florent (FRA)	0	24	27	24
40	Nur Ain Ayuni F (MAS)	0	23	26	25
8	Zhou DY (CHN)	6	25	27	27

Round of 16
9	Li T-c (TPE)	6	27	23	28	27
8	Zhou DY (CHN)	2	20	15	28	27

=== Section 3 ===
1/24 elimination round
37	M Zaemova (KAZ)	6	26	27	25
28	S Trapeznikova (UKR)	0	23	25	20
21	Sui Y-c (TPE)	6	25	29	25	27
44	S Noceti (ITA)	2	26	28	21	22

Round of 32
5	Choi M-s (KOR)	6	29	27	27	29
37	M Zaemova (KAZ)	2	22	29	21	24
21	Sui Y-c (TPE)	6	26	28	29
12	M Fallah (IRI)	0	24	27	26

Round of 16
5	Choi M-s (KOR)	6	28	28	30
21	Sui Y-c (TPE)	0	24	25	28

=== Section 4 ===
1/24 elimination round
45	Nuramalia Haneesha M (MAS)	2	25	22	21	23
20	J Gottlieb (USA)	6	22	25	27	24
29	K Plaza (POL)	2	23	28	27	20
36	N Degani (ITA)	6	27	25	28	21

Round of 32
13	A Rolando (ITA)	6	27	25	28
20	J Gottlieb (USA)	0	23	23	24
36	N Degani (ITA)	1	26	21	23	24
4	W Sonoda (JPN)	7	26	29	28	30

Round of 16
13	A Rolando (ITA)	0	23	26	24
4	W Sonoda (JPN)	6	26	27	26

=== Section 5 ===
1/24 elimination round
35	Poon W T (HKG)	6	25	25	25	28	26
30	O Shubkina (UKR)	4	29	27	24	27	25
19	R Sawaiyan (IND)	6	24	21	28	27
46	K Napłoszek (POL)	0	27	20	27	22

Round of 32
3	Wang LM (CHN)	6	27	28	29
35	Poon W T (HKG)	0	24	23	21
19	R Sawaiyan (IND)	2	27	27	24	26
14	D Tursunbek (KAZ)	6	25	28	26	27

Round of 16
3	Wang LM (CHN)	0	25	24	27
14	D Tursunbek (KAZ)	6	26	26	28

=== Section 6 ===
1/24 elimination round
43	N Zamanova (AZE)	2	23	18	25	20
22	L Nanou (GRE)	6	26	26	23	21
27	Nur Afisa A H (MAS)	6	27	24	26	24
38	M-A Tempelman (NED)	2	25	27	25	20

Round of 32
11	A Ramel (FRA)	7	26	26	24	25
22	L Nanou (GRE)	1	24	26	23	21
27	Nur Afisa A H (MAS)	4	26	26	22	26	27
6	M Gaubil (FRA)	6	25	26	26	26	29

Round of 16
11	A Ramel (FRA)	2	25	27	30	25
6	M Gaubil (FRA)	6	26	28	27	27

=== Section 7 ===
1/24 elimination round
39	N Soo (SGP)	2	27	22	23	23
26	R Mayumi (JPN)	6	24	26	25	27
23	K Wu (USA)	6	24	23	21	24
42	I Tang (SGP)	2	25	21	20	23

Round of 32
7	Peng C-m (TPE)	7	28	27	24	28	28
26	R Mayumi (JPN)	3	29	26	24	26	26
23	K Wu (USA)	0	24	26	25
10	Li XX (CHN)	6	27	27	27

Round of 16
7	Peng C-m (TPE)	6	27	29	28
10	Li XX (CHN)	0	26	26	27

=== Section 8 ===
1/24 elimination round
15	K Sueki (JPN)	6	25	28	27
50	M Altansoyombo (MGL)	0	24	24	14
47	N Celan (MDA)	5	25	27	24	25	23^{8}
18	Z Röse (TUR)	6	26	27	22	21	27^{10}
31	I Grzemski (AUS)	6	26	22	23	28	27
34	N Howell (USA)	4	24	24	27	26	23

Round of 32
15	K Sueki (JPN)	6	23	26	28	26	29
18	Z Röse (TUR)	4	27	26	25	25	29
34	I Grzemski (AUS)	0	25	25	26
2	Kim S-h (KOR)	6	28	28	27

Round of 16
15	K Sueki (JPN)	0	26	27	26
2	Kim S-h (KOR)	6	28	28	29

=== Finals ===
Quarter-finals
1	Lee Ga-hyun (KOR)	6	27	28	28	27	28
9	Li Tsai-chi (TPE)	4	29	26	26	29	26
5	Choi Mi-sun (KOR)	7	28	30	28	27	28
4	Waka Sonoda (JPN)	3	28	28	27	30	27
14	Diana Tursunbek (KAZ)	6	26	27	27	25
6	Mélanie Gaubil (FRA)	2	27	25	26	22
7	Peng Chia-mao (TPE)	6	29	26	29	30
2	Kim So-hee (KOR)	2	28	29	26	28

Semi-finals
1	Lee Ga-hyun (KOR)	4	28	28	29	27	26
5	Choi Mi-sun (KOR)	6	30	27	28	28	27
14	Diana Tursunbek (KAZ)	6	28	27	26	27	26^{10}
7	Peng Chia-mao (TPE)	5	26	27	28	23	27^{8}

Gold medal match
5	Choi Mi-sun (KOR)	6	26	29	29	27
14	Diana Tursunbek (KAZ)	2	27	27	27	26
Bronze medal match
1	Lee Ga-hyun (KOR)	2	29	27	27	28
7	Peng Chia-mao (TPE)	6	27	28	28	29
