= Zambia at the 2021 Summer World University Games =

- Flag of Zambia
- IOC code: ZAM

in Chengdu, China 28 July 2023 – 8 August 2023
- Competitors: 13 (8 men and 5 women)
- Medals: Gold 0 Silver 0 Bronze 0 Total 0

Summer World University Games appearances
- 1959; 1961; 1963; 1965; 1967; 1970; 1973; 1975; 1977; 1979; 1981; 1983; 1985; 1987; 1989; 1991; 1993; 1995; 1997; 1999; 2001; 2003; 2005; 2007; 2009; 2011; 2013; 2015; 2017; 2019; 2021; 2025; 2027

Zambia competed at the 2021 Summer World University Games in Chengdu, China held from 28 July to 8 August 2023.

== Competitors ==
Sport	Men	Women	Total
Athletics	6	1	7
Badminton	1	1	2
Table tennis	0	1	1
Tennis	1	2	3
Total	8	5	13

== Athletics ==
Men
Track

Athlete	Event	Heat		Semi-finals		Final	
Athlete	Event	Result	Rank	Result	Rank	Result	Rank
Patrick Banda	100 metres	11.32	53	Did not advance			
Patrick Banda	200 metres	22.57 PB	48	Did not advance			
Moses Chileshe	400 metres	Disqualified		Did not advance			
Mushota Lengwe	1500 metres	4:22.98	27	—		Did not advance	
Mushota Lengwe	5000 metres	Did not finish		—		Did not advance	
Jonathan Musunga	1500 metres	4:06.48	23	—		Did not advance	
Jonathan Musunga	5000 metres	16:33.08	22	—		Did not advance	
Innocent Kanyala	800 metres	1:54.54	31	Did not advance			
Patrick Banda; Innocent Kanyala; Moses Chileshe; Jonathan Musunga	4 × 400 metres relay	Disqualified		—		Did not advance	

Field

Athlete	Event	Qualification		Final	
Athlete	Event	Result	Rank	Result	Rank
Patrick Banda	Long jump	Did not start			
Mubanga Chishimba	Discus throw	—		34.04	11
Mubanga Chishimba	Javelin throw	58.95	16	Did not advance	

Women
Track

Athlete	Event	Heat		Semi-finals		Final	
Athlete	Event	Result	Rank	Result	Rank	Result	Rank
Lushomo Mukakanga	100 metres	12.84	43	Did not advance			
Lushomo Mukakanga	200 metres	Disqualified		Did not advance			

== Badminton ==
Athlete	Event	Round of 64	Round of 32	Round of 16	Quarterfinal	Semifinal	Final / BM	
Athlete	Event	Opposition Score	Opposition Score	Opposition Score	Opposition Score	Opposition Score	Opposition Score	Rank
Malama Musonda	Men's singles	Koluzaiev (UKR); L 0–2	Did not advance					
Mutale Mukuka	Women's singles	Wilson (GER); L 0–2	Did not advance					
Malama Musonda; Mutale Mukuka	Mixed doubles	Chow / Tsang (HKG); L 0–2	Did not advance					

== Table tennis ==
Athlete	Event	Group round				Round of 64	Round of 32	Round of 16	Quarterfinal	Semifinal	Final / BM	
Athlete	Event	Opposition Result	Opposition Result	Opposition Result	Rank	Opposition Result	Opposition Result	Opposition Result	Opposition Result	Opposition Result	Opposition Result	Rank
Taonga Zulu	Women's singles	Amah (NGR); D 0–0 w/o	Soo (HKG); L 0–3 w/o	Rexhaj (ALB); L 0–3 w/o	3	Did not advance						

== Tennis ==
Athlete	Event	Round of 64	Round of 32	Round of 16	Quarter-finals	Semi-finals	Final	
Athlete	Event	Opponent score	Opponent score	Opponent score	Opponent score	Opponent score	Opponent score	Rank
Nabusanga Hamayangwe	Men's singles	Cloud (USA); L 0–2	Did not advance					
Patricia Sazambile	Women's singles	Bayogo (PHI); W 2–0	Wong (TPE); L 0–2	Did not advance				
Queen Sakala	Women's singles	Valikhanova (UZB); L 0–2	Did not advance					
Queen Sakala; Patricia Sazambile	Women's doubles	Bye	Kovapitukted / Tararudee (THA); L 0–2	Did not advance				
Nabusanga Hamayangwe; Patricia Sazambile	Mixed doubles	Bye	Charlton / Stevens (AUS); L 0–2	Did not advance				
Nabusanga Hamayangwe	Men's consolation	—	Bye	Moncada (COL); L 0–2	Did not advance			
