= Estonia at the 2021 Summer World University Games =

- Flag of Estonia
- IOC code: EST

in Chengdu, China 28 July 2023 – 8 August 2023
- Competitors: 15 (7 men and 8 women)
- Medals: Gold 0 Silver 0 Bronze 0 Total 0

Summer World University Games appearances
- 1993; 1995; 1997; 1999; 2001; 2003; 2005; 2007; 2009; 2011; 2013; 2015; 2017; 2019; 2021; 2025; 2027

Estonia competed at the 2021 Summer World University Games in Chengdu, China held from 28 July to 8 August 2023.

== Competitors ==
| Sport | Men | Women | Total |
|---|---|---|---|
| Athletics | 2 | 0 | 2 |
| Badminton | 2 | 2 | 4 |
| Fencing | 1 | 0 | 1 |
| Judo | 1 | 0 | 1 |
| Rhythmic gymnastics | 0 | 2 | 2 |
| Swimming | 1 | 3 | 4 |
| Tennis | 0 | 1 | 1 |
| Total | 7 | 8 | 15 |

== Athletics ==
Men

| Athlete | Event | Heat | | Semi-finals | | Final | |
| Athlete | Event | Result | Rank | Result | Rank | Result | Rank |
|---|---|---|---|---|---|---|---|
| Leonid Latsepov | Half marathon | —N/a | | | | 1:06:05 | 7 |
| Deniss Salmijanov | 800 metres | 1:50.61 | 12 q | 1:48.40 | 11 | Did not advance | |

== Badminton ==
Doubles

| Athlete | Event | Round of 65 | Round of 32 | Round of 16 | Quarterfinal | Semifinal | Final / BM | |
| Athlete | Event | Opposition Score | Opposition Score | Opposition Score | Opposition Score | Opposition Score | Opposition Score | Rank |
|---|---|---|---|---|---|---|---|---|
| Anton Berik; Mikk Õunmaa | Men's doubles | Yakovlev / Koluzaiev (UKR); W 2–1 | Bielin / Chim (USA); L 0–2 | Did not advance | | | | |
| Andra Hoop; Ramona Üprus | Women's doubles | Tung / Hsu (TPE); L 0–2 | Did not advance | | | | | |
| Anton Berik; Andra Hoop | Mixed doubles | Kim / Lee (KOR); L 0–2 | Did not advance | | | | | |
| Mikk Õunmaa; Ramona Üprus | Mixed doubles | Öztürk / Erçetin (TUR); W 2–0 | Chua / Li (SGP); L 1–2 | Did not advance | | | | |

Team

| Player | Event | Group stage | | | Quarter-finals | Semi-finals | Final / BM | |
| Player | Event | Opponent score | Opponent score | Opponent score | Opponent score | Opponent score | Opponent score | Rank |
|---|---|---|---|---|---|---|---|---|
| Anton Berik; Mikk Õunmaa; Andra Hoop; Ramona Üprus | Team | Chinese Taipei (TPE); L 0–5 | Hong Kong (HKG); L 0–5 | Germany (GER); L 0–5 | Poland (POL); L 1–3 | Did not advance | | |

== Fencing ==
| Athlete | Event | Group stage | | | | | | | Round of 128 | Round of 64 | Round of 32 | Round of 16 | Quarter-finals | Semi-finals | Final / BM | |
| Athlete | Event | Opponent score | Opponent score | Opponent score | Opponent score | Opponent score | Opponent score | Rank | Opponent score | Opponent score | Opponent score | Opponent score | Opponent score | Opponent score | Opponent score | Rank |
|---|---|---|---|---|---|---|---|---|---|---|---|---|---|---|---|---|
| Ruslan Eskov | Men's individual épée | Sidikov (UZB); W 5–3 | Alzarooni (UAE); W 5–2 | Talib (LBA); W 5–0 | Michalak (POL); L 4–5 | Tauriainen (FIN); W 5–3 | Matsumoto (JPN); L 3–4 | 22 Q | Bye | Koshman (UKR); W 14–13 | Midelton (FRA); L 8–15 | Did not advance | | | | |

== Judo ==
Men

| Athlete | Event | Round of 32 | Round of 16 | Quarter-finals | Semi-finals | Repechage | Final / BM | |
| Athlete | Event | Opponent score | Opponent score | Opponent score | Opponent score | Opponent score | Opponent score | Rank |
|---|---|---|---|---|---|---|---|---|
| Mattias Kuusik | Men's 90 kg | Maruska (SVK); W 10–00 | Laborde (FRA); W 01–00 | Gőz (HUN); L 00–10 | Did not advance | Baigazy (KAZ); L 00–10 | Did not advance | 7 |

== Rhythmic gymnastics ==
| Athlete | Event | Apparatus | | | | Total | Rank |
| Athlete | Event | Hoop (rhythmic gymnastics) | Ball (rhythmic gymnastics) | Clubs (rhythmic gymnastics) | Ribbon (rhythmic gymnastics) | Total | Rank |
|---|---|---|---|---|---|---|---|
| Adelina Beljajeva | Individual All-around | 26.800 | 27.000 | 27.250 | 25.750 | 106.800 | 16 |
| Marie-Anett Kaasik | Individual All-around | 23.750 | 24.100 | 19.850 | 22.150 | 89.850 | 25 |

== Swimming ==
Men

| Athlete | Event | Heat | | Semi-finals | | Final | |
| Athlete | Event | Time | Rank | Time | Rank | Time | Rank |
|---|---|---|---|---|---|---|---|
| Jannes Niine | 50 metre backstroke | 26.24 | 22 | Did not advance | | | |
| Jannes Niine | 100 metre backstroke | 57.42 | 27 | Did not advance | | | |
| Jannes Niine | 200 metre backstroke | 2:08.26 | 18 | Did not advance | | | |

Women

| Athlete | Event | Heat | | Semi-finals | | Final | |
| Athlete | Event | Time | Rank | Time | Rank | Time | Rank |
|---|---|---|---|---|---|---|---|
| Sofja Krivorukova | 50 metre backstroke | 31.71 | 28 | Did not advance | | | |
| Sofja Krivorukova | 100 metre backstroke | 1:09.32 | 30 | Did not advance | | | |
| Sofja Krivorukova | 100 metre breaststroke | 1:21.33 | 29 | Did not advance | | | |
| Marie Toompuu | 50 metre freestyle | 27.78 | 31 | Did not advance | | | |
| Marie Toompuu | 50 metre breaststroke | 34.66 | 27 | Did not advance | | | |
| Marie Toompuu | 100 metre breaststroke | 1:14.44 | 24 | Did not advance | | | |
| Marie Toompuu | 200 metre breaststroke | 2:47.70 | 19 | Did not advance | | | |
| Marie Toompuu | 200 metre individual medley | 2:31.17 | 23 | Did not advance | | | |
| Hanna Grete Vutt | 50 metre backstroke | 31.07 | 26 | Did not advance | | | |
| Hanna Grete Vutt | 100 metre backstroke | 1:06.77 | 27 | Did not advance | | | |
| Hanna Grete Vutt | 200 metre backstroke | 2:25.62 | 21 | Did not advance | | | |

== Tennis ==
| Athlete | Event | Round of 64 | Round of 32 | Round of 16 | Quarter-finals | Semi-finals | Final | |
| Athlete | Event | Opponent score | Opponent score | Opponent score | Opponent score | Opponent score | Opponent score | Rank |
|---|---|---|---|---|---|---|---|---|
| Helena Narmont | Women's singles | Ribeiro (POR); L 1–2 | Did not advance | | | | | |
| Helena Narmont | Women's consolation | —N/a | | Weir (AUS); W 2–1 | Vos (RSA); W 2–0 | Nagata (JPN); L 1–2 | Did not advance | |
