= Archery at the 2021 Summer World University Games – Men's team recurve =

Men's team recurve at the 2021 Summer World University Games
- Venue: Shuangliu Modern Pentathlon Centre
- Location: Chengdu, China
- Dates: 27 – 30 July 2023
- Competitors: 42 from 14 nations

Medalists
gold medal	Seo Min-gi; Kim Pil-joong; Choi Doo-hee	South Korea
silver medal	Kuo Yu-cheng; Chang Yi-chung; Yang Zong-han	Chinese Taipei
bronze medal	Matteo Bilisari; Matteo Borsani; Francesco Gregori	Italy

The men's team recurve archery competition at the 2021 Summer World University Games was held in the Shuangliu Modern Pentathlon Centre, Chengdu, China between July 27 and 31.

== Records ==
Prior to the competition, the world and Universiade records were as follows.

- 216 arrows qualification round

Category	Team	Athlete	Score	Record	Date	Place	Event
World record	South Korea	Im Dong-hyun	699	2087	20 July 2012	London, United Kingdom	2012 Summer Olympics
World record	South Korea	Kim Bub-min	698	2087	20 July 2012	London, United Kingdom	2012 Summer Olympics
World record	South Korea	Oh Jin-hyek	690	2087	20 July 2012	London, United Kingdom	2012 Summer Olympics
Universiade record	South Korea	Lee Seung-yun	693	2062	4 July 2015	Gwangju, South Korea	2015 Summer Universiade
Universiade record	South Korea	Ku Bon-chan	686	2062	4 July 2015	Gwangju, South Korea	2015 Summer Universiade
Universiade record	South Korea	Kim Woo-jin	683	2062	4 July 2015	Gwangju, South Korea	2015 Summer Universiade

== Qualification round ==
The ranking round took place on 27 July 2023 to determine the seeding for the elimination rounds. It consisted of three archers' results in individual event, with a maximum score of 2160.

Rank	Team	Archer	Individual			Team		
Rank	Team	Archer	Score	10s	Xs	Total	10s	Xs
1	South Korea	Seo Min-gi	683	41	14	2008	103	34
1	South Korea	Kim Pil-joong	676	36	13	2008	103	34
1	South Korea	Choi Doo-hee	649	26	7	2008	103	34
2	China	Feng Hao	675	34	13	1992	83	35
2	China	Kao Wenchao	668	29	14	1992	83	35
2	China	Shi Zhenqi	649	20	8	1992	83	35
3	Italy	Matteo Bilisari	667	27	14	1985	92	23
3	Italy	Matteo Borsani	662	36	5	1985	92	23
3	Italy	Francesco Gregori	656	29	4	1985	92	23
4	India	Yashdeep Bhoge	674	35	10	1985	88	30
4	India	Sachin Gupta	657	27	11	1985	88	30
4	India	Akhit Samudrala	654	26	9	1985	88	30
5	Japan	Tetsuya Aoshima	667	32	9	1979	89	30
5	Japan	Nozomi Fujii	666	34	11	1979	89	30
5	Japan	Yuki Kawata	646	23	10	1979	89	30
6	France	Thomas Chirault	669	27	11	1965	69	22
6	France	Clément Jacquey	650	20	5	1965	69	22
6	France	Iban Bariteaud	646	22	6	1965	69	22
7	Chinese Taipei	Kuo Yu-cheng	656	30	11	1959	74	23
7	Chinese Taipei	Chang Yi-chung	656	25	8	1959	74	23
7	Chinese Taipei	Yang Zong-han	647	19	4	1959	74	23
8	Hong Kong	Kwok Yin Chai	675	31	12	1920	61	21
8	Hong Kong	Yip Tin Long	628	16	3	1920	61	21
8	Hong Kong	Leung Cheuk Yin	617	14	6	1920	61	21
9	Kazakhstan	Mansur Alimbayev	648	20	7	1915	58	21
9	Kazakhstan	Alexandr Yeremenko	642	19	7	1915	58	21
9	Kazakhstan	Ivan Bercha	625	19	7	1915	58	21
10	Poland	Maksymilian Osuch	651	21	8	1908	55	18
10	Poland	Piotr Starzycki	629	18	5	1908	55	18
10	Poland	Arkadiusz Smoliński	628	16	5	1908	55	18
11	Malaysia	Mohd Rizuwan	636	16	5	1870	50	16
11	Malaysia	Mohamad Firdaus Mohd Rusmadi	633	19	6	1870	50	16
11	Malaysia	Muhammad Farhan Rhyme	601	15	5	1870	50	16
12	Mongolia	Tsenguun Tsogtbayar	652	26	9	1864	47	14
12	Mongolia	Enkhbayar Munkh-Erdene	619	12	1	1864	47	14
12	Mongolia	Khatanzorig Namsrai	593	9	4	1864	47	14
13	Australia	Markus Kuhrau	609	15	7	1801	39	13
13	Australia	James Gaze	601	13	3	1801	39	13
13	Australia	Jason Hurnall	591	11	3	1801	39	13
14	Slovakia	Ondrej Franců	612	13	4	1774	37	9
14	Slovakia	Maroš Machán	581	14	3	1774	37	9
14	Slovakia	Andrej Majerik	581	10	2	1774	37	9

== Elimination round ==
The results are as below.

Round of 16
9	Kazakhstan	5	55	52	56	54
8	Hong Kong	3	57	52	51	53
5	Japan	6	56	57	54
12	Mongolia	0	49	54	51
13	Australia	0	46	43	53
4	India	6	55	57	54
3	Italy	6	58	54	54
14	Slovakia	0	54	48	48
11	Malaysia	5	55	54	57
6	France	1	53	52	57
7	Chinese Taipei	5	54	56	56	51	28
10	Poland	4	53	57	50	53	27

Quarter-finals
1	South Korea	6	57	56	58
9	Kazakhstan	0	52	54	54
5	Japan	1	52	53	54
4	India	5	57	54	54
3	Italy	5	54	50	56	51	26
11	Malaysia	4	51	56	49	52	24
7	Chinese Taipei	5	55	53	52	53	27
2	China	4	54	56	53	51	25

Semi-finals
1	South Korea	5	53	58	54	55
4	India	3	53	53	56	54
3	Italy	3	54	57	52	54
7	Chinese Taipei	5	56	49	52	55

Gold medal match
1	South Korea	6	52	54	55
7	Chinese Taipei	0	49	53	48
Bronze medal match
4	India	3	55	53	54	53
3	Italy	5	53	53	57	54
