= Mobina Fallah =

Iranian archer (born 1999)

Personal information
- Born: 13 August 1999 (age 26); Yazd, Iran

Sport
- Country: Iran
- Sport: Archery

Mobina Fallah (Persian: مبینا فلاح; born 13 August 1999 in Yazd) is an Iranian archer. She was the only representative of Iran's archery at the 2024 Summer Olympics In Paris.
