= Tennis at the 2021 Summer World University Games =

Tennis at the 2021 Summer Universiade
- Date: 29 July–6 August 2023
- Edition: 20th
- Location: Sichuan International Tennis Centre
← 2019 ·	Summer Universiade	· 2025 →

Tennis was contested at the 2021 Summer World University Games from 29 July to 6 August, 2023 at the Sichuan International Tennis Centre in Chengdu, China.

== Medal table ==
* Host nation (China)

Rank	Nation	Gold	Silver	Bronze	Total
1	Chinese Taipei (TPE)	5	1	1	7
2	China (CHN)*	1	3	0	4
3	Switzerland (SUI)	1	1	1	3
4	Czech Republic (CZE)	0	1	0	1
4	Thailand (THA)	0	1	0	1
6	Japan (JPN)	0	0	5	5
7	France (FRA)	0	0	1	1
7	Hong Kong (HKG)	0	0	1	1
7	South Korea (KOR)	0	0	1	1
7	United States (USA)	0	0	1	1
7	Uzbekistan (UZB)	0	0	1	1
Totals (11 entries)		7	7	12	26

== Participating nations ==
A total of 124 athletes from 28 nations competed in tennis at the 2021 Summer World University Games:

- Australia (4)
- Azerbaijan (2)
- Brazil (3)
- China (8)
- Colombia (4)
- Czech Republic (4)
- Estonia (1)
- France (5)
- Hong Kong (7)
- India (8)
- Indonesia (4)
- Italy (2)
- Japan (8)
- Mongolia (3)
- Nigeria (1)
- Philippines (3)
- Portugal (4)
- South Africa (7)
- South Korea (7)
- Switzerland (3)
- Slovakia (2)
- Chinese Taipei (6)
- Thailand (8)
- Uganda (4)
- United States (6)
- Uzbekistan (6)
- Zambia (3)
- Zimbabwe (1)

=== Events ===
Event	Gold	Silver	Bronze
Men's singles	Henry von der Schulenburg; Switzerland	Kasidit Samrej; Thailand	Jang Yun-seok; South Korea
Men's singles	Henry von der Schulenburg; Switzerland	Kasidit Samrej; Thailand	Sergey Fomin; Uzbekistan
Women's singles	Guo Hanyu; China	Yang Ya-yi; Chinese Taipei	Liang En-shuo; Chinese Taipei
Women's singles	Guo Hanyu; China	Yang Ya-yi; Chinese Taipei	Alice Robbe; France
Men's doubles	Chinese Taipei (TPE); Hsu Yu-hsiou; Huang Tsung-hao	Czech Republic (CZE); Jan Jermář; Victor Sklenka	Switzerland (SUI); Jonas Schär; Jeffrey von der Schulenburg
Men's doubles	Chinese Taipei (TPE); Hsu Yu-hsiou; Huang Tsung-hao	Czech Republic (CZE); Jan Jermář; Victor Sklenka	Japan (JPN); Shinji Hazawa; Ryotaro Taguchi
Women's doubles	Chinese Taipei (TPE); Wu Fang-hsien; Liang En-shuo	China (CHN); Guo Hanyu; Jiang Xinyu	Japan (JPN); Misaki Matsuda; Ikumi Yamazaki
Women's doubles	Chinese Taipei (TPE); Wu Fang-hsien; Liang En-shuo	China (CHN); Guo Hanyu; Jiang Xinyu	United States (USA); Kimberly Hance; Elise Wagle
Mixed doubles	Chinese Taipei (TPE); Hsu Yu-hsiou; Wu Fang-hsien	China (CHN); Jin Yuquan; Tang Qianhui	Japan (JPN); Tomoya Fujiwara; Lisa Marie Rioux
Mixed doubles	Chinese Taipei (TPE); Hsu Yu-hsiou; Wu Fang-hsien	China (CHN); Jin Yuquan; Tang Qianhui	Hong Kong (HKG); Coleman Wong; Cody Wong Hong-yi
Men's team classification	Chinese Taipei (TPE); Ray Ho; Hsu Yu-hsiou; Huang Tsung-hao; Lo Chien-hsun	Switzerland (SUI); Jonas Schär; Henry von der Schulenburg; Jeffrey von der Schulenburg	Japan (JPN); Tomoya Fujiwara; Shinji Hazawa; Hikaru Shiraishi; Ryotaro Taguchi
Women's team classification	Chinese Taipei (TPE); Liang En-shuo; Tsao Chia-yi; Wu Fang-hsien; Yang Ya-yi	China (CHN); Guo Hanyu; Jiang Xinyu; Tang Qianhui; Zheng Wushuang	Japan (JPN); Misaki Matsuda; Anri Nagata; Lisa Marie Rioux; Ikumi Yamazaki

== See also ==
- Tennis at the Summer Universiade
