= Czech Republic at the 2021 Summer World University Games =

- Flag of the Czech Republic
- IOC code: CZE

in Chengdu, China 28 July 2023 – 8 August 2023
- Competitors: 101 (52 men and 49 women)
- Flag bearer: Jiří Přívratský
- Medals Ranked 14th: Gold 4 Silver 3 Bronze 5 Total 12

Summer World University Games appearances
- 1993; 1995; 1997; 1999; 2001; 2003; 2005; 2007; 2009; 2011; 2013; 2015; 2017; 2019; 2021; 2025; 2027

Czech Republic competed at the 2021 Summer World University Games in Chengdu, China held from 28 July to 8 August 2023.

== Medal summary ==
=== Medal by sports ===
Rank	Sports	Gold	Silver	Bronze	Total
1	Shooting	1	1	3	5
2	Athletics	1	1	1	3
3	Basketball	1	0	0	1
3	Rowing	1	0	0	1
5	Tennis	0	1	0	1
6	Artistic gymnastics	0	0	1	1
Totals (6 entries)		4	3	5	12

=== Medalists ===
Medal	Name	Sport	Event	Day
Gold	Matěj Rampula	Shooting	Men's 25m rapid fire pistol	30 July
Gold	Vilém Stráský	Athletics	Men's decathlon	3 August
Gold	Anna Šantrůčková	Rowing	Women's single sculls	6 August
Gold	Nikolaos Noumeros; Martin Svoboda; Matěj Burda; Tomáš Jansa; Patrick Samoura; Vojtěch Sýkora / Pavel Novák; Marek Vyroubal; Dalibor Vlk; Jan Zídek; Luboš Kovář; František Fuxa	Basketball	Men's tournament	6 August
Silver	Pavel Schejbal; Veronika Schejbalová	Shooting	Mixed team 10m air pistol	2 August
Silver	Eliška Martínková	Athletics	Women's 20 kilometres walk	5 August
Silver	Victor Andrés Sklenka; Jan Jermář	Tennis	Men's doubles	5 August
Bronze	Jiří Přívratský	Shooting	Men's 50m rifle three positions	30 July
Bronze	Pavel Schejbal	Shooting	Men's 10m air pistol	1 August
Bronze	Veronika Blažíčková; Kateřina Štefánková; Sára Karasová	Shooting	Women's team 50m rifle three positions	1 August
Bronze	Barbora Malíková	Athletics	Women's 400 metres	3 August
Bronze	Dominika Ponížilová	Artistic gymnastics	Women's vault	5 August
