= Slovakia at the 2021 Summer World University Games =

- Flag of Slovakia
- IOC code: SVK

in Chengdu, China 28 July 2023 – 8 August 2023
- Competitors: 71 (39 men and 32 women)
- Medals Ranked 26th: Gold 1 Silver 2 Bronze 0 Total 3

Summer World University Games appearances
- 1993; 1995; 1997; 1999; 2001; 2003; 2005; 2007; 2009; 2011; 2013; 2015; 2017; 2019; 2021; 2025; 2027

Slovakia competed at the 2021 Summer World University Games in Chengdu, China held from 28 July to 8 August 2023.

== Medal summary ==
=== Medal by sports ===
Rank	Sports	Gold	Silver	Bronze	Total
1	Athletics	1	2	0	3
Totals (1 entries)		1	2	0	3

=== Medalists ===
Medal	Name	Sport	Event	Day
Gold	Viktória Forster	Athletics	Women's 100 metres hurdles	4 August
Silver	Viktória Forster	Athletics	Women's 100 metres	2 August
Silver	Hana Burzalová; Ema Hačundová; Alžbeta Ragasová	Athletics	Women's 20 kilometres walk team	5 August
