= Uzbekistan at the 2021 Summer World University Games =

- Flag of Uzbekistan
- IOC code: UZB

in Chengdu, China 28 July 2023 – 8 August 2023
- Competitors: 70 (36 men and 34 women)
- Medals Ranked 36th: Gold 0 Silver 8 Bronze 6 Total 14

Summer World University Games appearances
- 1959; 1961; 1963; 1965; 1967; 1970; 1973; 1975; 1977; 1979; 1981; 1983; 1985; 1987; 1989; 1991; 1993; 1995; 1997; 1999; 2001; 2003; 2005; 2007; 2009; 2011; 2013; 2015; 2017; 2019; 2021; 2025; 2027

Uzbekistan competed at the 2021 Summer World University Games in Chengdu, China held from 28 July to 8 August 2023.

== Medal summary ==
=== Medal by sports ===
Rank	Sports	Gold	Silver	Bronze	Total
1	Taekwondo	0	5	2	7
2	Judo	0	2	1	3
3	Wushu	0	1	1	2
4	Fencing	0	0	1	1
4	Tennis	0	0	1	1
Totals (5 entries)		0	8	6	14

=== Medalists ===
Medal	Name	Sport	Event	Day
Silver	Nurbek Murtozoev	Judo	Men's 81 kg	30 July
Silver	Darya Latisheva	Wushu	Women's nanquan	30 July
Silver	Omonjon Otajonov	Taekwondo	Men's 54 kg	31 July
Silver	Kamoliddin Bakhtiyorov; Mukhammadkodir Mansurov; Nurbek Murtozoev; Abdurakhim Nutfulloev; Islombek Ravshankulov; Javokhirbek Saparov; Mukhammadali Tangriev	Judo	Men's team	1 August
Silver	Amirbek Turaev	Taekwondo	Men's 58 kg	1 August
Silver	Shukhrat Salaev	Taekwondo	Men's 80 kg	1 August
Silver	Feruza Sadikova	Taekwondo	Women's 62 kg	2 August
Silver	Madinabonu Mannopova; Feruza Sadikova; Ozoda Sobirjonova; Madina Mirabzalova	Taekwondo	Women's team kyorugi	4 August
Bronze	Kamoliddin Bakhtiyorov	Judo	Men's 60 kg	29 July
Bronze	Najmiddin Kosimkhojiev	Taekwondo	Men's 74 kg	2 August
Bronze	Svetlana Osipova	Taekwondo	Women's 73 kg	3 August
Bronze	Azizbek Isroilov	Wushu	Men's 80 kg	3 August
Bronze	Sergey Fomin	Tennis	Men's singles	6 August
Bronze	Zaynab Dayibekova; Gulistan Perdebaeva; Aysuliu Usnatdinova	Fencing	Women's team sabre	7 August
