= Thailand at the 2021 Summer World University Games =

- Flag of Thailand
- IOC code: THA

in Chengdu, China 28 July 2023 – 8 August 2023
- Competitors: 55 (32 men and 23 women)
- Medals Ranked 21st: Gold 2 Silver 4 Bronze 6 Total 12

Summer World University Games appearances
- 1985; 1987; 1989; 1991; 1993; 1995; 1997; 1999; 2001; 2003; 2005; 2007; 2009; 2011; 2013; 2015; 2017; 2019; 2021; 2025; 2027

Thailand competed at the 2021 Summer World University Games in Chengdu, China held from 28 July to 8 August 2023.

== Medal summary ==
=== Medal by sports ===
Rank	Sports	Gold	Silver	Bronze	Total
1	Taekwondo	2	0	2	4
2	Athletics	0	2	0	2
3	Badminton	0	1	2	3
4	Tennis	0	1	0	1
5	Table tennis	0	0	1	1
5	Wushu	0	0	1	1
Totals (6 entries)		2	4	6	12

=== Medalists ===
Medal	Name	Sport	Event	Day
Gold	Panipak Wongpattanakit	Taekwondo	Women's 49 kg	1 August
Gold	Sasikarn Tongchan	Taekwondo	Women's 62 kg	2 August
Silver	Patsapong Amsam-ang	Athletics	Men's pole vault	5 August
Silver	Kasidit Samrej	Tennis	Men's singles	6 August
Silver	Natawat Iamudom; Soraoat Dapbang; Chayut Khongprasit; Thawatchai Himaiad	Athletics	Men's 4 × 100 metres relay	6 August
Silver	Panitchaphon Teeraratsakul	Badminton	Men's singles	7 August
Bronze	Sirawit Mahamad	Taekwondo	Men's 54 kg	31 July
Bronze	Lalinrat Chaiwan; Pornpicha Choeikeewong; Saran Jamsri; Chasinee Korepap; Ratchapol Makkasasithorn; Ruttanapak Oupthong / Pichamon Phatcharaphisuts; Jhenicha Sudjaipraparat; Nannapas Sukklad; Peeratchai Sukphun; Pakkapon Teeraratsakul; Panitchaphon Teeraratsakul	Badminton	Mixed team	2 August
Bronze	Napat Sritimongkol	Taekwondo	Men's 63 kg	3 August
Bronze	Armen Pangchai	Wushu	Men's 52 kg	3 August
Bronze	Orawan Paranang	Table tennis	Women's singles	5 August
Bronze	Chasinee Korepap; Jhenicha Sudjaipraparat	Badminton	Women's doubles	7 August
