= United States at the 2021 Summer World University Games =

- Flag of the United States
- IOC code: USA

in Chengdu, China 28 July 2023 – 8 August 2023
- Medals Ranked 24th: Gold 1 Silver 9 Bronze 13 Total 23

Summer World University Games appearances
- 1965; 1967; 1970; 1973; 1975; 1977; 1979; 1981; 1983; 1985; 1987; 1989; 1991; 1993; 1995; 1997; 1999; 2001; 2003; 2005; 2007; 2009; 2011; 2013; 2015; 2017; 2019; 2021; 2025; 2027

United States competed at the 2021 Summer World University Games in Chengdu, China held from 28 July to 8 August 2023.

== Medal summary ==
=== Medal by sports ===
Rank	Sports	Gold	Silver	Bronze	Total
1	Swimming	1	3	3	7
2	Shooting	0	2	1	3
3	Fencing	0	1	1	2
4	Archery	0	1	0	1
4	Athletics	0	1	0	1
4	Wushu	0	1	0	1
7	Diving	0	0	4	4
8	Basketball	0	0	1	1
8	Table tennis	0	0	1	1
8	Taekwondo	0	0	1	1
8	Tennis	0	0	1	1
Totals (11 entries)		1	9	13	23

=== Medalists ===
Medal	Name	Sport	Event	Day
Gold	Jackson Jones	Swimming	Men's 200 metre backstroke	6 August
Silver	Mary Tucker	Shooting	Women's 10 metre air rifle	29 July
Silver	Gavin Barnick	Shooting	Men's 50 metre rifle three positions	30 July
Silver	Alex Zhaoyi Ni	Wushu	Men's gunshu	30 July
Silver	Alyssa Sturgill	Archery	Women's individual compound	31 July
Silver	Megan van Berkom	Swimming	Women's 400 metre individual medley	1 August
Silver	Corrssia Perry	Athletics	Women's 400 metres	3 August
Silver	Amy Tang; Megan van Berkom; Mackenzie Hodges; Paige MacEachern; Noelle Harvey; Sabrina Johnston	Swimming	Women's 4 x 200 metre freestyle relay	4 August
Silver	Anya Mostek	Swimming	Women's 50 metre backstroke	6 August
Silver	Alexis Anglade; Chloe Fox-Gitomer; Tatiana Nazlymov; Kaitlyn Pak	Fencing	Women's team sabre	7 August
Bronze	Alex Lee; Adalis Munoz	Taekwondo	Mixed pair poomsae	30 July
Bronze	Sophia Verzyl	Diving	Women's 1 metre springboard	1 August
Bronze	Paige MacEachern	Swimming	Women's 400 metre individual medley	1 August
Bronze	Mary Tucker; Gavin Barnick	Shooting	Mixed team 10 metre air rifle	2 August
Bronze	Catherine Nixon	Fencing	Women's individual épée	2 August
Bronze	Sophia McAfee	Diving	Women's 10 metre platform	3 August
Bronze	Christopher Nagy	Swimming	Men's 1500 metre freestyle	3 August
Bronze	Caroline Theil	Swimming	Women's 200 metre individual medley	4 August
Bronze	Rachel Sung; Amy Wang	Table tennis	Women's doubles	4 August
Bronze	Kimberly Hance; Elise Wagle	Tennis	Women's doubles	5 August
Bronze	Sophia Verzyl	Diving	Women's 3 metre springboard	6 August
Bronze	Sion James; Gregg Glenn; Mier Panoam; Spencer Elliot; Collin Holloway; Jordan Wood / Kolby King; Marvin Williams III; Asher Woods; Percy Daniels; Kevin Cross Jr; Jaylen Forbes	Basketball	Men's tournament	6 August
Bronze	Gabrielle Filzen; Jaclynn Fowler; Sophia McAfee; Sophia Verzyl	Diving	Women's team	7 August
