= France at the 2021 Summer World University Games =

- Flag of France
- IOC code: FRA

in Chengdu, China 28 July 2023 – 8 August 2023
- Competitors: 106 (56 men and 50 women)
- Medals Ranked 10th: Gold 5 Silver 8 Bronze 10 Total 23

Summer World University Games appearances
- 1959; 1961; 1963; 1965; 1967; 1970; 1973; 1975; 1977; 1979; 1981; 1983; 1985; 1987; 1989; 1991; 1993; 1995; 1997; 1999; 2001; 2003; 2005; 2007; 2009; 2011; 2013; 2015; 2017; 2019; 2021; 2025; 2027

France competed at the 2021 Summer World University Games in Chengdu, China held from 28 July to 8 August 2023.

== Medal summary ==
=== Medal by sports ===
Rank	Sports	Gold	Silver	Bronze	Total
1	Fencing	3	2	4	9
2	Athletics	2	3	0	5
3	Judo	0	1	2	3
4	Archery	0	1	0	1
4	Wushu	0	1	0	1
6	Taekwondo	0	0	2	2
7	Swimming	0	0	1	1
7	Tennis	0	0	1	1
Totals (8 entries)		5	8	10	23

=== Medalists ===
Medal	Name	Sport	Event	Day
Gold	Kendrick Jean-Joseph	Fencing	Men's individual épée	3 August
Gold	Benoît Campion	Athletics	Men's 1500 metres	3 August
Gold	Tyvan Bibard; Aymerick Gally; Kendrick Jean-Joseph; Giacomo Mignuzzi	Fencing	Men's team épée	6 August
Gold	Simon Bedard	Athletics	Men's 5000 metres	6 August
Gold	Sarah Noutcha; Anne Poupinet; Cyrielle Rioux; Malina Vongsavady	Fencing	Women's team sabre	7 August
Silver	Victor Bouleau; Rémy Albanese; Nathan Cadronet	Archery	Men's team compound	30 July
Silver	Agathe Devitry	Judo	Women's -63 kg	30 July
Silver	Pierre Loisel	Fencing	Men's individual foil	4 August
Silver	Albane Dordain	Athletics	Women's pole vault	4 August
Silver	Berenice Petit	Athletics	Women's pole vault	4 August
Silver	Maïwen Ruggieri	Wushu	Women's 52 kg	5 August
Silver	Corentin le Clezio	Athletics	Men's 800 metres	6 August
Silver	Tyvan Bibard; Maximilien Chastanet; Pierre Loisel; Alexandre Sido	Fencing	Men's team foil	7 August
Bronze	Martha Fawaz	Judo	Women's -57 kg	29 July
Bronze	Arnaud Aregba	Judo	Men's -81 kg	30 July
Bronze	Khalida Haddad	Taekwondo	Women's -67 kg	1 August
Bronze	Samuel Jarry	Fencing	Men's individual sabre	2 August
Bronze	Athman Bouthouyak	Taekwondo	Men's -74 kg	2 August
Bronze	Luidgi Midelton	Fencing	Men's individual épée	3 August
Bronze	Malina Vongsavady	Fencing	Women's individual sabre	4 August
Bronze	Sarah Noutcha	Fencing	Women's individual sabre	4 August
Bronze	Océane Carnez	Swimming	Women's 200 m freestyle	6 August
Bronze	Alice Robbe	Tennis	Women's singles	6 August
