= Hong Kong at the 2021 Summer World University Games =

- Flag of Hong Kong
- IOC code: HKG

in Chengdu, China 28 July 2023 – 8 August 2023
- Competitors: 142 (80 men and 62 women)
- Flag bearers: Coleman Wong Chak-lam (Tennis); Lydia Sham Hui-yu (Wushu)
- Medals Ranked 16th: Gold 4 Silver 1 Bronze 7 Total 12

Summer World University Games appearances
- 1959; 1961; 1963; 1965; 1967; 1970; 1973; 1975; 1977; 1979; 1981; 1983; 1985; 1987; 1989; 1991; 1993; 1995; 1997; 1999; 2001; 2003; 2005; 2007; 2009; 2011; 2013; 2015; 2017; 2019; 2021; 2025; 2027

Hong Kong competed at the 2021 Summer World University Games in Chengdu, China held from 28 July to 8 August 2023.

== Medal summary ==
=== Medal by sports ===
Rank	Sports	Gold	Silver	Bronze	Total
1	Fencing	3	0	1	4
2	Wushu	1	1	2	4
3	Table tennis	0	0	2	2
4	Badminton	0	0	1	1
4	Tennis	0	0	1	1
Totals (5 entries)		4	1	7	12

=== Medalists ===
Medal	Name	Sport	Event	Day
Gold	Samuei Hui	Wushu	Men's taijijian	29 July
Gold	Kaylin Hsieh	Fencing	Women's individual épée	2 August
Gold	Cheung Ka Long	Fencing	Men's individual foil	4 August
Gold	Cheung Ka Long; Ryan Choi; Lee Yat Long Aaron; Lawrence Ng	Fencing	Men's team foil	7 August
Silver	Lau Chi Lung	Wushu	Men's nanquan	29 July
Bronze	Samuei Hui	Wushu	Men's taijiquan	30 July
Bronze	Lydia Sham	Wushu	Women's qiangshu	30 July
Bronze	Lam Yee Lok; Ng Wing Lam; Lee Hoi Man; Doo Hoi Kem; Soo Wai Yam	Table tennis	Women's team	1 August
Bronze	Ho Kwan Kit; Doo Hoi Kem	Table tennis	Mixed doubles	3 August
Bronze	Ryan Choi	Fencing	Men's individual foil	4 August
Bronze	Coleman Wong; Cody Wong Hong-yi	Tennis	Mixed doubles	6 August
Bronze	Ko Shing Hei	Badminton	Men's singles	7 August
