= Poland at the 2021 Summer World University Games =

- IOC code: POL
- NOC: University Sports Association of Poland
- Website: azs.pl

in Chengdu, China 28 July 2023 – 8 August 2023
- Competitors: 198
- Flag bearers: Patrycja Adamkiewicz; Łukasz Kozub
- Medals Ranked 5th: Gold 15 Silver 16 Bronze 12 Total 43

Summer Universiade appearances
- 1959; 1961; 1963; 1965; 1967; 1970; 1973; 1975; 1977; 1979; 1981; 1983; 1985; 1987; 1989; 1991; 1993; 1995; 1997; 1999; 2001; 2003; 2005; 2007; 2009; 2011; 2013; 2015; 2017; 2019; 2021

Poland will compete at the 2021 Summer World University Games in Chengdu, China from 28 July to 8 August 2023 which was postponed due to the COVID-19 pandemic.

The flagbearer at the opening ceremony was Patrycja Adamkiewicz and Łukasz Kozub.

== Medal summary ==
=== Medal by sports ===
Rank	Sports	Gold	Silver	Bronze	Total
1	Swimming	6	7	2	15
2	Athletics	6	6	4	16
3	Rowing	3	2	0	5
4	Volleyball	0	1	1	2
5	Taekwondo	0	0	2	2
6	Fencing	0	0	1	1
6	Judo	0	0	1	1
6	Shooting	0	0	1	1
Totals (8 entries)		15	16	12	43

=== Medalists ===
Medal	Name	Sport	Event	Day
Gold	Jakub Kraska; Dominik Dudys; Mateusz Chowaniec; Kamil Sieradzki; Piotr Ludwiczak; Marcel Wągrowski	Swimming	Men's 4 × 100 m freestyle relay	1 August
Gold	Nikola Horowska	Athletics	Women's long jump	2 August
Gold	Oskar Stachnik	Athletics	Men's discus throw	2 August
Gold	Konrad Bukowiecki	Athletics	Men's shot put	2 August
Gold	Kamil Sieradzki	Swimming	Men's 200 m freestyle	3 August
Gold	Nikola Horowska	Athletics	Women's 200 metres	4 August
Gold	Adela Piskorska	Swimming	Women's 100 m backstroke	4 August
Gold	Kamil Sieradzki	Swimming	Men's 100 m freestyle	5 August
Gold	Maciej Wyderka	Athletics	Men's 800 metres	6 August
Gold	Weronika Bartnowska; Karolina Łozowska; Margarita Koczanowa; Aleksandra Formella; Natalia Wosztyl; Marlena Granaszewska	Athletics	Women's 4 × 400 metres relay	6 August
Gold	Bartosz Bartkowski; Krzysztof Kasparek	Rowing	Men's double sculls	6 August
Gold	Zuzanna Jasińska	Rowing	Lightweight women's single sculls	6 August
Gold	Barbara Streng; Katarzyna Duda; Jakub Woźniak; Kajetan Szewczyk	Rowing	Mixed quadruple sculls	6 August
Gold	Jakub Majerski	Swimming	Men's 100 m butterfly	6 August
Gold	Adela Piskorska	Swimming	Women's 50 m backstroke	6 August
Silver	Magdalena Bokun	Athletics	Women's long jump	2 August
Silver	Szymon Mazur	Athletics	Men's shot put	2 August
Silver	Marlena Granaszewska	Athletics	Women's 200 metres	4 August
Silver	Jan Kałusowski	Swimming	Men's 100 m breaststroke	5 August
Silver	Jakub Majerski	Swimming	Men's 50 m butterfly	5 August
Silver	Dominika Sztandera; Jakub Majerski; Kornelia Fiedkiewicz; Kacper Stokowski; Wiktoria Piotrowska; Marcin Goraj; Wiktoria Guść; Dawid Wiekiera	Swimming	Mixed 4 × 100 m medley relay	5 August
Silver	Marlena Granaszewska; Monika Romaszko; Paulina Paluch; Nikola Horowska; Weronika Bartnowska	Athletics	Women's 4 × 100 metres relay	6 August
Silver	Cyprian Mrzygłód	Athletics	Men's javelin throw	6 August
Silver	Adam Łukomski; Patryk Grzegorzewicz; Daniel Sołtysiak; Mateusz Rzeźniczak; Krzysztof Hołub; Jakub Olejniczak	Athletics	Men's 4 × 400 metres relay	6 August
Silver	Katarzyna Boruch; Martyna Jankowska; Izabela Pawlak; Anna Potrzuska	Rowing	Women's four	6 August
Silver	Paulina Chrzanowska; Izabela Gałek	Rowing	Women's double sculls	6 August
Silver	Adrian Jaśkiewicz	Swimming	Men's 100 m butterfly	6 August
Silver	Paulina Peda	Swimming	Women's 50 m backstroke	6 August
Silver	Dominika Sztandera	Swimming	Women's 50 m breaststroke	7 August
Silver	Adela Piskorska; Dominika Sztandera; Paulina Peda; Kornelia Fiedkiewicz; Wiktoria Piotrowska; Aleksandra Knop	Swimming	Women's 4 × 100 m medley relay	7 August
Silver	Jakub Czyżowski; Łukasz Kozub; Kewin Sasak; Michał Gierżot; Damian Kogut; Mariusz Magnuszewski / Jakub Abramowicz; Dawid Woch; Maciej Krysiak; Dawid Dulski; Kamil Szymura; Mateusz Poręba	Volleyball	Men's tournament	7 August
Bronze	Oskar Miliwek	Shooting	Men's 25 m rapid fire pistol	30 July
Bronze	Kacper Szczurowski	Judo	Men's +100 kg	31 July
Bronze	Patrycja Adamkiewicz	Taekwondo	Women's -57 kg	31 July
Bronze	Dominika Sztandera	Swimming	Women's 100 m breaststroke	3 August
Bronze	Jan Jurkiewicz	Fencing	Men's individual foil	4 August
Bronze	Dawid Piłat	Athletics	Men's hammer throw	4 August
Bronze	Łucja Oleszczuk; Julia Sereda; Patrycja Adamkiewicz; Aleksandra Kowalczuk	Taekwondo	Women's team	4 August
Bronze	Aleksandra Śmiech	Athletics	Women's hammer throw	5 August
Bronze	Adrianna Laskowska	Athletics	Women's triple jump	5 August
Bronze	Krzysztof Kiljan	Athletics	Men's 110 metres hurdles	5 August
Bronze	Mateusz Chowaniec	Swimming	Men's 100 m freestyle	5 August
Bronze	Kornelia Moskwa; Marta Orzyłowska; Małgorzata Lisiak; Aleksandra Rasińska; Pola Nowakowska; Julita Piasecka / Kinga Drabek; Karolina Drużkowska; Marta Łyczakowska; Justyna Łysiak; Alicja Grabka; Weronika Szlagowska	Volleyball	Women's tournament	6 August

== Competitors ==
At the 2021 Summer World University Games will participate 198 athletes.

=== Men ===
Athlete	Date of birth	Sport	University
Jakub Abramowicz	10 April 1998	Volleyball	WSM Warszawa
Mikołaj Adamczak	18 December 2002	Basketball	Opole University of Technology
Jakub Augustyniak	4 September 2001	Athletics	University of Łódź
Maciej Bielec	17 September 1997	Fencing	AWF Wrocław
Konrad Bukowiecki	17 March 1997	Athletics	WSP Szczytno
Mateusz Chowaniec	3 October 2003	Swimming	AWF Katowice
Damian Chrzanowski	7 June 1998	Swimming	AWF Wrocław
Łukasz Cimosz	29 March 2001	Badminton	WSEwS Warszawa
Robert Cybulski	6 August 1999	Badminton	WSEwS Warszawa
Jakub Czyżowski	14 December 2001	Volleyball	WSZiA Opole
Dawid Dulski	1 November 2002	Volleyball	WSZiA Opole
Sebastian Gawroński	12 April 1996	Artistic gymnastics	AWF Katowice
Michał Gierżot	4 October 2001	Volleyball	WSZiA Opole
Marcin Goraj	20 April 2001	Swimming	University of Pittsburgh
Kacper Gordon	6 May 2002	Basketball	Nicolaus Copernicus University in Toruń
Krzysztof Hołub	27 July 2000	Athletics	Maria Curie-Skłodowska University
Rafał Horbowicz	1 April 1998	Athletics	WSG Bydgoszcz
Adrian Jaśkiewicz	31 January 2002	Swimming	AWF Warszawa
Michał Jędrzejewski	6 February 2002	Judo	Gdańsk University of Technology
Mateusz Jopek	14 February 1996	Athletics	AWF Wrocław
Jan Jurkiewicz	5 October 2000	Fencing	St. John's University
Krzysztof Kaczkowski	1 October 1997	Fencing	AWF Katowice
Krzysztof Kajor	6 February 2003	Fencing	AWF Katowice
Jan Kałusowski	12 March 2002	Swimming	Łódź University of Technology
Grzegorz Kamiński	13 May 2000	Basketball	AGH University of Krakow
Krzysztof Kiljan	30 December 1999	Athletics	UTH Warszawa
Kacper Kłaczek	6 January 2002	Basketball	Saint Joseph's University
Damian Kogut	3 January 1997	Volleyball	WSZiA Opole
Wojciech Kolańczyk	14 July 1999	Fencing	Wrocławska Akademia Biznesu w Naukach Stosowanych
Andrzej Kowalczyk	30 November 1998	Athletics	Jagiellonian University
Mateusz Kozak	16 June 1999	Fencing	University of Gdańsk
Łukasz Kozub	3 November 1997	Volleyball	WSZiA Opole
Jakub Kraska	19 April 2000	Swimming	University of Łódź
Michał Krasuski	21 May 2000	Basketball	Bydgoszcz University of Science and Technology
Maciej Krysiak	7 January 1999	Volleyball	WSZiA Opole
Cezary Litka	5 April 2002	Rowing	WSG Bydgoszcz
Piotr Ludwiczak	1 May 1996	Swimming	AWF Katowice
Adam Łukomski	6 September 2001	Athletics	AWF Wrocław
Mariusz Magnuszewski	14 September 1997	Volleyball	WSZiA Opole
Jakub Majerski	18 August 2000	Swimming	AWF Katowice
Mikołaj Malec	16 July 2001	Swimming	University of Missouri
Sebastian Marcinkiewicz	4 April 1997	Judo	WSB Wrocław
Szymon Mazur	2 September 1998	Athletics	Józef Piłsudski University of Physical Education in Warsaw
Damian Michalak	4 April 1999	Fencing	AWF Katowice
Oskar Miliwek	11 April 1997	Shooting	WSTiJO Warszawa
Cyprian Mrzygłód	2 February 1998	Athletics	AWFiS Gdańsk
Łukasz Nowak	22 November 2001	Taekwondo	Józef Piłsudski University of Physical Education in Warsaw
Kacper Nowinowski	3 February 2003	Fencing	ANS Konin
Jakub Olejniczak	27 February 1997	Athletics	University School of Physical Education in Kraków
Maksymilian Osuch	18 April 2003	Archery	AWF Poznań
Bartłomiej Pelczar	5 February 2000	Basketball	University of Economics and Innovation
Szymon Piątkowski	3 January 2003	Taekwondo	University of Warmia and Mazury in Olsztyn
Dawid Piłat	6 February 2002	Athletics	WSEwS Warszawa
Adam Podralski	25 January 2002	Fencing	Medical University of Gdańsk
Mateusz Poręba	24 August 1999	Volleyball	WSZiA Opole
Sebastian Rompa	19 March 2001	Basketball	Polish Naval Academy
Jakub Rosa	2 August 2001	Shooting	University of Zielona Góra
Mateusz Rzeźniczak	23 July 1998	Athletics	Łódź University of Technology
Kewin Sasak	20 February 1997	Volleyball	WSZiA Opole
Kamil Sieradzki	11 January 2002	Swimming	AWF Katowice
Michał Sitnik	15 September 2000	Basketball	AWF Wrocław
Mateusz Siuda	5 May 1998	Athletics	AWF Poznań
Arkadiusz Smoliński	15 August 1997	Archery	UWSB Toruń
Szymon Sobiech	29 May 2002	Basketball	AGH University of Krakow
Oskar Stachnik	1 March 1998	Athletics	Maria Curie-Skłodowska University
Piotr Starzycki	26 February 1998	Archery	PJATK Warszawa
Kacper Stokowski	6 January 1999	Swimming	North Carolina State University
Piotr Szczepanik	11 December 2000	Fencing	Warsaw University of Technology
Mateusz Szczęsnowski	29 May 2001	Taekwondo	University School of Physical Education in Kraków
Kacper Szczurowski	3 March 1997	Judo	WSEwS Warszawa
Filip Szeląg	9 February 1999	Archery	Silesian University of Technology
Bartłomiej Szurlej	19 September 2000	Fencing	Wrocław University of Economics
Mikołaj Szymanowski	27 November 2003	Badminton	AWF Katowice
Jakub Szymański	22 July 2002	Athletics	WSG Bydgoszcz
Kamil Szymura	24 January 1999	Volleyball	WSZiA Opole
Wojciech Tomaszewski	20 February 2002	Basketball	Polish Naval Academy
Szymon Tomczak	17 January 1998	Basketball	AWF Wrocław
Filip Wagner	13 June 2001	Shooting	Poznań University of Economics and Business
Marcel Wągrowski	19 December 1999	Swimming	Łódź University of Technology
Dawid Wiekiera	4 November 2001	Swimming	Silesian University of Technology
Dawid Woch	16 May 1997	Volleyball	WSZiA Opole
Adrian Wojtkowiak	6 September 1998	Fencing	Poznań University of Technology
Adrian Wojtkowiak	13 December 2001	Taekwondo	AWF Poznań
Marcin Woroniecki	13 March 2000	Basketball	AGH University of Krakow
Maciej Wyderka	29 July 2002	Athletics	AWF Katowice
Patryk Wykrota	13 November 2000	Athletics	AWF Poznań
Łukasz Żak	31 May 1997	Athletics	Maria Curie-Skłodowska University
Łukasz Żok	17 May 2001	Athletics	AJP Gorzów Wlkp.

=== Women ===
Athlete	Date of birth	Sport	University
Patrycja Adamkiewicz	11 June 1998	Taekwondo	Józef Piłsudski University of Physical Education in Warsaw
Gabriela Andrukonis	17 September 2002	Athletics	Bialystok University of Technology
Julia Bazan	7 January 2001	Basketball	University of Business and Administration in Gdynia
Edyta Bielska	17 June 2001	Athletics	University of Gdańsk
Magdalena Bokun	29 May 1996	Athletics	AWF Katowice
Kamila Borkowska	26 July 2002	Basketball	WSZiA Opole
Barbara Brych	4 December 2000	Fencing	University School of Physical Education in Kraków
Zuzanna Cieślar	8 November 2000	Fencing	AWF Katowice
Kinga Drabek	10 May 1998	Volleyball	WSZiA Opole
Karolina Drużkowska	6 March 2002	Volleyball	AK Kalisz
Kornelia Fiedkiewicz	5 August 2001	Swimming	Loughborough College
Aleksandra Formella	27 October 2001	Athletics	WSG Bydgoszcz
Weronika Górecka	4 May 2000	Swimming	University of Akron
Alicja Grabka	9 May 1998	Volleyball	WSZiA Opole
Marlena Granaszewska	8 June 1998	Athletics	East European Academy of Applied Sciences in Białystok
Wiktoria Guść	14 February 2004	Swimming	University of Szczecin
Paulina Hankiewicz	30 May 2001	Badminton	SGTiH Vistula Warszawa
Nikola Horowska	3 January 2001	Athletics	AJP Gorzów Wilkp.
Weronika Janicka	3 September 1999	Fencing	AWF Katowice
Maja Jarosińska	24 January 2001	Shooting	University of Zielona Góra
Zuzanna Jasińska	5 November 2002	Rowing	Wrocław University of Science and Technology
Aleksandra Jeglińska	27 December 1999	Fencing	Collegium Civitas
Patrycja Kapała	26 March 1997	Athletics	Maria Curie-Skłodowska University
Wiktoria Keller	18 May 2000	Basketball	AJP Gorzów Wlkp.
Anastasiya Khomich	27 September 2002	Badminton	Gdańsk University of Technology
Aleksandra Knop	9 September 2003	Swimming	WSBiNoZ Łódź
Natalia Kochańska	18 August 1996	Shooting	University of Warsaw
Margarita Koczanowa	1 February 1999	Athletics	University School of Physical Education in Kraków
Emilia Kośla	10 January 2001	Basketball	Maria Curie-Skłodowska University
Aleksandra Kowalczuk	18 December 1996	Taekwondo	WSHiU Poznań
Paulina Krzysiek	12 August 1996	Table tennis	WSEwS Warszawa
Zuzanna Kulińska	5 January 2001	Basketball	McNeese State University
Adrianna Laskowska	2 March 1996	Athletics	ANS Poznań
Małgorzata Lisiak	11 July 1996	Volleyball	WSZiA Opole
Weronika Lizakowska	2 November 1998	Athletics	UWSB Gdańsk
Karolina Łozowska	28 May 1999	Athletics	WSEwS Warszawa
Marta Łyczakowska	2 May 1998	Volleyball	WSZiA Opole
Justyna Łysiak	20 January 1999	Volleyball	WSZiA Opole
Klaudia Malgrem	11 November 2003	Fencing	Collegium Humanum – Warsaw Management University
Kornelia Marczak	8 March 1997	Badminton	AWF Katowice
Julia Mikołowska	17 June 2003	Shooting	Nicolaus Copernicus University Ludwik Rydygier Collegium Medicum in Bydgoszcz
Karolina Młodawska	4 October 1996	Athletics	Jan Kochanowski University
Kornelia Moskwa	30 October 1996	Volleyball	WSZiA Opole
Anna Mroszczak	2 October 1997	Fencing	University of Silesia in Katowice
Weronika Nagięć	27 June 2002	Athletics	University School of Physical Education in Kraków
Kamila Napłoszek	26 May 1999	Archery	Medical University of Warsaw
Julita Niemojewska	16 June 1998	Basketball	Polish Naval Academy
Agata Nowak	5 February 1996	Shooting	Jan Kochanowski University
Pola Nowakowska	30 January 1996	Volleyball	WSG Bydgoszcz
Łucja Oleszczuk	7 September 2001	Taekwondo	Józef Piłsudski University of Physical Education in Warsaw
Marta Orzyłowska	10 May 1998	Volleyball	University of Opole
Jowita Ossowska	7 April 1996	Basketball	Polish Naval Academy
Paulina Paluch	3 December 1998	Athletics	WSG Bydgoszcz
Aleksandra Parzeńska	16 September 1997	Basketball	Polish Naval Academy
Wioletta Pawluczek	12 June 1997	Shooting	AWF Katowice
Paulina Peda	18 March 1998	Swimming	AWF Katowice
Julita Piasecka	25 September 2002	Volleyball	WSZiA Opole
Julia Piotrowska	22 June 2001	Shooting	AWF Wrocław
Wiktoria Piotrowska	12 December 2003	Swimming	Józef Piłsudski University of Physical Education in Warsaw
Adela Piskorska	16 November 2003	Swimming	Maria Curie-Skłodowska University
Klaudia Płaza	17 May 2003	Archery	University of Silesia in Katowice
Aleksandra Płocińska	5 October 1999	Athletics	Warsaw University of Life Sciences
Kamila Podgórna	19 September 1996	Basketball	Polish Naval Academy
Zuzanna Puc	12 August 1997	Basketball	University of Utah
Aleksandra Rasińska	6 November 1998	Volleyball	WSZiA Opole
Monika Romaszko	13 April 2002	Athletics	Lublin University of Technology
Julia Sereda	4 October 2002	Taekwondo	Collegium Humanum – Warsaw Management University
Daria Skonieczna	20 November 2002	Fencing	Józef Piłsudski University of Physical Education in Warsaw
Julia Słocka	18 February 2001	Athletics	Cardinal Stefan Wyszyński University in Warsaw
Izabela Smolińska	14 January 1999	Athletics	Warsaw University of Life Sciences
Karolina Stefańczyk	12 May 1999	Basketball	Wrocław University of Environmental and Life Sciences
Weronika Szlagowska	29 November 2001	Volleyball	WSZiA Opole
Dominika Sztandera	19 January 1997	Swimming	AWF Wrocław
Ewelina Śmiałek	29 March 2002	Basketball	AWF Poznań
Aleksandra Śmiech	2 October 1997	Athletics	Warsaw School of Economics
Renata Tomczak	29 May 1999	Fencing	Poznań University of Technology
Dominika Wasilczuk	20 August 2000	Fencing	Józef Piłsudski University of Physical Education in Warsaw
Anna Węgrzyn	9 January 2001	Table tennis	Wrocław University of Economics
Katarzyna Węgrzyn	9 January 2001	Table tennis	Wrocław University of Economics
Aleksandra Wieczorek	31 August 2002	Fencing	Adam Mickiewicz University in Poznań
Klaudia Wojtunik	15 May 1999	Athletics	University of Łódź
Natalia Wosztyl	29 August 1999	Athletics	Kazimierz Pułaski University of Technology and Humanities in Radom
Agata Zakrzewska	16 February 2000	Table tennis	University of Warsaw
Małgorzata Zawodniak	16 February 2000	Fencing	AWF Poznań
Kinga Zgryźniak	22 June 2003	Fencing	Silesian University of Technology
Sylwia Zyzańska	27 July 1997	Archery	Jagiellonian University

== Swimming ==
Men

Athlete	Event	Heat		Semifinal		Final	
Athlete	Event	Time	Rank	Time	Rank	Time	Rank
Kacper Stokowski	50 m backstroke			did not advance			
Kacper Stokowski	100 m backstroke			did not advance			
Marcin Goraj	100 m backstroke			did not advance			
Marcin Goraj	200 m backstroke			did not advance			
Piotr Ludwiczak	50 m backstroke			did not advance			
Piotr Ludwiczak	50 m freestyle			did not advance			
Mateusz Chowaniec	50 m freestyle		7 Q		2 Q		
Mateusz Chowaniec	100 m freestyle		Q		4 Q		
Mateusz Chowaniec	200 m freestyle		Q		4 Q		
Damian Chrzanowski	200 m butterfly		9 Q		8 Q		
Damian Chrzanowski	400 m freestyle		Q		Q		
Jakub Majerski	50 m butterfly		9 Q		8 Q		
Jakub Majerski	100 m butterfly		Q		Q		
Kacper Majchrzak	100 m freestyle	49.48	7 Q	48.68	2 Q	48.38	2nd place, silver medalist(s)
Kacper Majchrzak	200 m freestyle		5 Q		4 Q		2nd place, silver medalist(s)
Mikołaj Malec	200 m backstroke		5 Q		2 Q		
Mikołaj Malec	400 m freestyle		15 Q			did not advance	
Adrian Jaśkiewicz	50 m butterfly			did not advance			
Adrian Jaśkiewicz	100 m butterfly		8 Q			did not advance	
Adrian Jaśkiewicz	200 m butterfly		Q	did not start		did not advance	
Kamil Sieradzki	100 m freestyle			did not advance			
Kamil Sieradzki	200 m freestyle			did not advance			
Jan Kałusowski	50 m breaststroke			did not advance			
Jan Kałusowski	100 m breaststroke		Q		Q		
Jan Kałusowski	200 m breaststroke			did not advance			
Dawid Wiekiera	50 m breaststroke			did not advance			
Dawid Wiekiera	100 m breaststroke		Q		Q		
Dawid Wiekiera	200 m breaststroke			did not advance			
Marcel Wągrowski	200 m individual medley			did not advance			
Jakub Kraska	200 m individual medley		Q	—			
[[]] [[]] [[]] [[]] [[]]	4 × 100 m freestyle relay		5 Q	—			
[[]] [[]] [[]] [[]] [[]]	4 × 200 m freestyle relay		5 Q	—			
[[]] [[]] [[]] [[]] [[]]	4 × 100 m medley relay		5 Q	—			

Women

Athlete	Event	Heat		Semifinal		Final	
Athlete	Event	Time	Rank	Time	Rank	Time	Rank
Wiktoria Guść	50 m freestyle			did not advance			
Wiktoria Guść	100 m freestyle			did not advance			
Wiktoria Guść	200 m freestyle			did not advance			
Wiktoria Guść	400 m freestyle			did not advance			
Wiktoria Guść	200 m individual medley		15 Q			did not advance	
Wiktoria Piotrowska	50 m butterfly		4 Q		3 Q		
Wiktoria Piotrowska	100 m butterfly		10 Q			did not advance	
Kornelia Fiedkiewicz	50 m freestyle			did not advance			
Kornelia Fiedkiewicz	100 m freestyle			—		did not advance	
Paulina Peda	50 m backstroke			did not advance			
Paulina Peda	100 m backstroke			did not advance			
Paulina Peda	50 m butterfly		11 Q			did not advance	
Paulina Peda	100 m butterfly		6 Q		8 Q		
Dominika Sztandera	50 m breaststroke		4 Q		15 Q		
Dominika Sztandera	100 m breaststroke		15 Q			did not advance	
Adela Piskorska	50 m backstroke		3 Q		4 Q		
Adela Piskorska	100 m backstroke		7 Q			did not advance	
Adela Piskorska	200 m backstroke		Q	did not start		did not advance	
Weronika Górecka	200 m backstroke			—		did not advance	
Aleksandra Knop	400 m freestyle			—		did not advance	
Aleksandra Knop	200 m individual medley		15 Q			did not advance	
Aleksandra Knop	400 m individual medley			—		did not advance	
Aleksandra Knop	200 m butterfly			did not advance			
[[]] [[]] [[]] [[]] [[]]	4 × 100 m freestyle relay			—		did not advance	
[[]] [[]] [[]] [[]] [[]]	4 × 200 m freestyle relay	DSQ		—		did not advance	
[[]] [[]] [[]] [[]] [[]]	4 × 100 m medley relay		Q	—			
