= Athletics at the 2021 Summer World University Games – Men's 1500 metres =

The men's 1500 metres event at the 2021 Summer World University Games was held on 1 and 3 August 2023 at the Shuangliu Sports Centre Stadium in Chengdu, China.

== Medalists ==
Gold	Silver	Bronze
Benoît Campion; France	Oussama Cherrad; Algeria	Yervand Mkrtchyan; Armenia

== Results ==
=== Round 1 ===
Qualification: First 4 in each heat (Q) advance to final.

==== Heat 1 ====
Rank	Athlete	Nation	Time	Notes
1	Yervand Mkrtchyan	Armenia	3:48.17	Q
2	Oussama Cherrad	Algeria	3:48.26	Q
3	Nursultan Keneshbekov	Kyrgyzstan	3:48.30	Q
4	Xie Dongsheng	China	3:48.30	Q
5	Christopher Swart	South Africa	3:48.89	
6	Eric Källman	Sweden	3:54.59	SB
7	Yoonus Shah	India	3:54.70	
8	Antônio Barreto	Brazil	3:59.05	
9	Louie Agawa	Philippines	4:29.88	
—	Abdul Al-Kharusi	Oman	DNF	
—	Anass Essayi	Morocco	DNS	

==== Heat 2 ====
Rank	Athlete	Nation	Time	Notes
1	Benoît Campion	France	3:42.82	Q
2	Emmanuel Otim	Uganda	3:42.89	Q
3	Flavien Szot	France	3:42.99	Q
4	Leo Magnusson	Sweden	3:43.19	Q
5	Sigurd Tveit	Norway	3:45.90	
6	İbrahim Erata	Turkey	3:58.85	
7	Hiroto Takamura	Japan	4:00.28	
8	Jonathan Musunga	Zambia	4:06.48	
8	Yankuba Jahateh	The Gambia	4:10.89	
10	Daniel Lara	Colombia	4:14.00	
—	Guilherme Orenhas	Brazil	DNF	

==== Heat 3 ====
Rank	Athlete	Nation	Time	Notes
1	Nuno Pereira	Portugal	3:44.79	Q
2	Marcel Tobler	Austria	3:45.05	Q
3	Liu Dezhu	China	3:45.07	Q
4	Ali Idow Hassan	Somalia	3:45.45	Q
5	Andrzej Kowalczyk	Poland	3:46.31	
6	Arjun Waskale	India	3:48.49	
7	Léandre Hamenyimana	Burundi	3:56.59	
8	Patrick James	Tanzania	4:07.87	
9	Mushota Lengwe	Zambia	4:22.98	
—	Omid Amirian	Iran	DNF	
—	Fouad Messaoudi	Morocco	DNS	
—	Sildrey Veloria	Northern Mariana Islands	DNS	

=== Final ===
Rank	Athlete	Nation	Time	Notes
1st place, gold medalist(s)	Benoît Campion	France	3:38.61	
2nd place, silver medalist(s)	Oussama Cherrad	Algeria	3:40.64	
3rd place, bronze medalist(s)	Yervand Mkrtchyan	Armenia	3:40.68	
4	Emmanuel Otim	Uganda	3:41.32	PB
5	Nuno Pereira	Portugal	3:41.56	
6	Marcel Tobler	Austria	3:41.64	
7	Liu Dezhu	China	3:42.55	
8	Leo Magnusson	Sweden	3:42.65	
9	Ali Idow Hassan	Somalia	3:43.47	
10	Nursultan Keneshbekov	Kyrgyzstan	3:43.54	
11	Xie Dongsheng	China	3:45.28	
12	Flavien Szot	France	3:48.21	
