= Volleyball at the 2021 Summer World University Games =

Volleyball at the Chengdu 2021 FISU World University Games
- Venue: various
- Dates: July 29, 2023 – August 7, 2023
- Teams: 16 (men) & 12 (women)

Volleyball at the 2021 Summer World University Games in Chengdu was played between July 29 and August 7, 2023. 28 volleyball teams participated at the tournament.

== Qualification ==
Following the current FISU regulations, The maximum of 16 teams in 2 volleyball events where the number of entries is larger than the authorised participation level will be selected by

- The entry and the payment of guarantee.
- Those 8 (in men's tournament) or 5 (in women's tournament) teams finishing top rankings of the previous edition will be automatically qualified.If any country gives up, the next in line is called up.
- Those 4 teams finishing bottom rankings of the previous edition will be replaced by new applying teams.If they are among the 4 relegated in the previous edition, the fifth worst team is the one that is eliminated.This rule did not need to be applied in this edition due to the high number of withdrawals from the tournament.
- The host country is always automatically qualified.
- The remaining teams could will be selected by wild card system according to geographical, continental representation, FISU ranking and FIVB rankings.

=== Qualified teams ===
==== Men's competition ====
Means of qualification	Date	Venue	Vacancies	Qualified
Host country	—	—	1	China
Top eight of previous edition	5–13 July 2019	(Italy) Naples	8	Italy; Poland; ~~Russia~~; ~~France~~; Japan; Czech Republic; Chinese Taipei; Portugal; Switzerland; South Korea
Continental Quotas	—	—	2	Brazil; Ukraine
Americas Wild Cards	—	—	1	Argentina; ~~Mexico~~; ~~United States~~; ~~Canada~~
Last time Invitations	—	—	5	Azerbaijan; Germany; India; Iran; Hong Kong; ~~Cyprus~~; ~~Australia~~
Total			16	

==== Women's competition ====
Means of qualification	Date	Venue	Vacancies	Qualified
Host country	—	—	1	China
Top five of previous edition	5–13 July 2019	(Italy) Naples	5	~~Russia~~; Italy; Japan; ~~Hungary~~; Germany; Brazil; Czech Republic
Continental Quotas	—	—	2	~~Mexico~~; ~~United States~~; Argentina; Chinese Taipei; ~~Australia~~; ~~Ukraine~~
Wildcards or Late Accepts	—	—	4	Colombia; Hong Kong; Poland; India
Total			12	

== Medal table ==
* Host nation (China)

Rank	Nation	Gold	Silver	Bronze	Total
1	China (CHN)*	1	0	1	2
2	Italy (ITA)	1	0	0	1
3	Poland (POL)	0	1	1	2
4	Japan (JPN)	0	1	0	1
Totals (4 entries)		2	2	2	6

Source: Medal&Rank

== Draw ==
=== Men's competition ===
Pool A	Pool B	Pool C	Pool D
Poland	Czech Republic	China	Italy
Portugal	Argentina	Japan	Chinese Taipei
South Korea	Iran	Ukraine	Brazil
Hong Kong	India	Azerbaijan	Germany

=== Women's competition ===
Pool A	Pool B	Pool C	Pool D
Brazil	China	Italy	Japan
Poland	Argentina	India	Colombia
Chinese Taipei	Germany	Hong Kong	Czech Republic

== Medal events ==
Event	Gold	Silver	Bronze
Men	Italy (ITA); Paolo Porro; Tim Held; Alberto Pol; Francesco Recine (c); Davide Gardini; Lorenzo Cortesia; Nicola Salsi; Damiano Catania; Marco Vitelli; Edoardo Caneschi; Giulio Magalini; Lorenzo Sala	Poland (POL); Jakub Czyżowski; Łukasz Kozub (c); Kewin Sasak; Michał Gierżot; Damian Kogut; Mariusz Magnuszewski; Jakub Abramowicz; Dawid Woch; Maciej Krysiak; Dawid Dulski; Kamil Szymura; Mateusz Poręba	China (CHN); Chen Leiyang; Wang Hebin; Zhang Jingyin (c); Yu Yuantai; Wang Bin; Deng Xinpeng; Peng Shikun; Li Yongzhen; Wang Dongchen; Zhang Guanhua; Yang Yiming; Hu Zhenzhuo
Women	China (CHN); Zhang Shiqi; Ma Wanyue; Xie Shengyu; Xu Jianan; Wu Mengjie; Gao Yi; Zhong Hui; Xu Xiaoting; Zhuang Yushan (c); Wang Wenhan; Zhou Yetong; Miao Yiwen	Japan (JPN); Sayaka Yokota (c); Sae Nakajima; Saki Ishikura; Angelina Kobayashi; Kurumi Takama; Hiroyo Yamanaka; Haruna Kawabata; Tsukasa Nakagawa; Yoshino Sato; Haruka Oyama; Furi Kosa; Ameze Miyabe	Poland (POL); Kornelia Moskwa; Marta Orzyłowska; Małgorzata Lisiak; Aleksandra Rasińska; Pola Nowakowska; Julita Piasecka; Kinga Drabek; Karolina Drużkowska; Marta Łyczakowska; Justyna Łysiak; Alicja Grabka (c); Weronika Szlagowska
