= Athletics at the 2021 Summer World University Games – Men's 5000 metres =

The men's 5000 metres event at the 2021 Summer World University Games was held on 4 and 6 August 2023 at the Shuangliu Sports Centre Stadium in Chengdu, China.

The winning margin was 0.05 seconds which as of 2024 remains the narrowest winning margin for the men's 5,000 metres at these games.

== Medalists ==
Gold	Silver	Bronze
Simon Bédard; France	Taiyo Yasuhara; Japan	Nursultan Keneshbekov; Kyrgyzstan

== Results ==
=== Round 1 ===
Qualification: First 8 in each heat (Q) advance to final.

==== Heat 1 ====
Rank	Athlete	Nation	Time	Notes
1	Simon Bédard	France	14:39.26	Q
2	Said Ameri	Algeria	14:39.64	Q
3	Eemil Helander	Finland	14:42.00	Q
4	Matthew Forrester	South Africa	14:42.20	Q
5	Taiyo Yasuhara	Japan	14:42.91	Q
6	Robi Syianturi	Indonesia	14:46.44	Q
7	Chen Zhongping	China	14:53.44	Q
8	Patrick James	Tanzania	14:59.94	Q
9	Anurag Yadav	India	15:29.21	
10	Yankuba Jahateh	The Gambia	16:39.79	
—	Mushota Lengwe	Zambia	DNF	
—	William Amponsah	Ghana	DNS	
—	Abdullah Tuğluk	Turkey	DNS	
—	Léandre Hamenyimana	Burundi	DNS	

==== Heat 2 ====
Rank	Athlete	Nation	Time	Notes
1	Nursultan Keneshbekov	Kyrgyzstan	14:30.88	Q
2	Shotaro Ishihara	Japan	14:31.91	Q
3	Dismas Yeko	Uganda	14:33.10	Q
4	Sebastian Frey	Austria	14:34.65	Q
5	Omar Seraiche	Algeria	14:35.33	Q
6	Abdurrahman Gediklioglu	Turkey	14:37.84	Q
7	Julien Rebeck	France	14:38.16	Q
8	Guillaume Cachelin	Switzerland	14:38.54	Q
9	Yang Kegu	China	14:46.82	
10	Henrik Laukli	Norway	15:02.63	
11	Ravi Ravi	India	15:28.38	
12	Tse Chun Yin	Hong Kong	15:32.40	
13	Jonathan Musunga	Zambia	16:33.08	

=== Final ===
Rank	Athlete	Nation	Time	Notes
1st place, gold medalist(s)	Simon Bédard	France	14:14.10	
2nd place, silver medalist(s)	Taiyo Yasuhara	Japan	14:14.15	
3rd place, bronze medalist(s)	Nursultan Keneshbekov	Kyrgyzstan	14:15.33	SB
4	Shotaro Ishihara	Japan	14:16.43	
5	Said Ameri	Algeria	14:20.01	
6	Omar Seraiche	Algeria	14:21.13	PB
7	Eemil Helander	Finland	14:21.80	
8	Julien Rebeck	France	14:22.33	
9	Dismas Yeko	Uganda	14:23.14	
10	Guillaume Cachelin	Switzerland	14:24.69	
11	Abdurrahman Gediklioglu	Turkey	14:26.13	
12	Matthew Forrester	South Africa	14:26.30	
13	Sebastian Frey	Austria	14:29.48	
14	Robi Syianturi	Indonesia	14:38.45	
15	Chen Zhongping	China	15:07.41	
16	Patrick James	Tanzania	15:19.30	
