= 2019 European Athletics U23 Championships – Men's javelin throw =

Men's javelin throw at U23 Championships

The men's javelin throw event at the 2019 European Athletics U23 Championships was held in Gävle, Sweden, at Gavlehov Stadium Park on 11 and 13 July.

== Medalists ==
Gold	Silver	Bronze
Cyprian Mrzygłód; Poland	Alexandru Novac; Romania	Aliaksei Katkavets; Belarus

== Results ==
=== Qualification ===
The qualification was held on 11 July at 18:27.

Qualification rule: 76.00 (Q) or the 12 best results (q) qualified for the final.

Rank	Group	Name	Nationality	#1	#2	#3	Results	Notes
1	A	Aliaksei Katkavets	Belarus	82.46			82.46	Q, NU23R
2	A	Alexandru Novac	Romania	78.30			78.30	Q
3	B	Dagbjartur Daði Jónsson	Iceland	74.51	76.85		76.85	Q
4	B	Cyprian Mrzygłód	Poland	76.35			76.35	Q
5	B	Manu Quijera	Spain	76.23			76.23	Q
6	A	Patriks Gailums	Latvia	74.73	69.91	x	74.73	q
7	A	Lassi Saarinen	Finland	x	73.17	73.05	73.17	q
8	A	Nikolay Orlov	Authorised Neutral Athletes	73.07	68.25	69.77	73.07	q
9	B	Valery Izotau	Belarus	72.20	x	x	72.20	q
10	A	Emin Öncel	Turkey	70.86	71.30	71.00	71.30	q
11	B	Toni Keränen	Finland	68.44	68.95	69.93	69.93	q
12	A	Simone Comini	Italy	64.30	62.91	69.93	69.93	q
13	B	Denis Picus	Moldova	x	68.12	66.48	68.12	
14	A	Jakob Samuelsson	Sweden	x	67.87	x	67.87	
15	B	Ümit Değirmenci	Turkey	66.98	67.44	65.10	67.44	
16	A	İsmet Pekbak	Turkey	x	64.00	66.54	66.54	
17	B	Matīss Velps	Latvia	62.02	x	65.55	65.55	
18	B	Alexandru Ştefan Grigore	Romania	x	x	61.81	61.81	

=== Final ===
Rank	Name	Nationality	#1	#2	#3	#4	#5	#6	Result	Notes
1st place, gold medalist(s)	Cyprian Mrzygłód	Poland	79.29	81.74	81.48	78.48	81.16	84.97	84.97	CR, NU23R
2nd place, silver medalist(s)	Alexandru Novac	Romania	78.36	79.48	79.96	79.97	81.75	78.80	81.75	
3rd place, bronze medalist(s)	Aliaksei Katkavets	Belarus	71.34	80.31	73.04	x	77.30	76.09	80.31	
4	Patriks Gailums	Latvia	68.30	78.65	75.51	69.97	70.91	79.81	79.81	
5	Manu Quijera	Spain	71.49	76.69	79.22	x	76.08	x	79.22	
6	Dagbjartur Daði Jónsson	Iceland	76.30	75.39	76.14	70.77	74.50	74.23	76.30	
7	Toni Keränen	Finland	74.15	69.64	68.53	71.97	73.94	72.10	74.15	
8	Lassi Saarinen	Finland	69.82	73.17	71.42	–	x	69.30	73.17	
9	Valery Izotau	Belarus	x	72.15	71.55				72.15	
10	Emin Öncel	Turkey	71.70	68.65	–				71.70	
11	Nikolay Orlov	Authorised Neutral Athletes	66.93	71.42	68.39				71.42	
12	Simone Comini	Italy	64.25	69.64	58.63				69.64	
