= Athletics at the 2021 Summer World University Games – Men's javelin throw =

The men's javelin throw event at the 2021 Summer World University Games was held on 4 and 6 August 2023 at the Shuangliu Sports Centre Stadium in Chengdu, China.

== Medalists ==
Gold	Silver	Bronze
Edis Matusevičius; Lithuania	Cyprian Mrzygłód; Poland	Topias Laine; Finland

== Results ==
=== Qualification ===
Qualification: Qualifying performance 80.00 (Q) or at least 12 best performers (q) advance to the final.

Rank	Group	Name	Nationality	#1	#2	#3	Result	Notes
1	B	Cyprian Mrzygłód	Poland	66.57	75.54	–	75.54	q
2	A	Edis Matusevičius	Lithuania	x	x	75.14	75.14	q
3	B	Jakub Kubínec	Slovakia	67.41	74.09	–	74.09	q
4	B	Topias Laine	Finland	73.81	–	–	73.81	q
5	A	Emin Öncel	Turkey	x	70.16	73.02	73.02	q
6	A	Yusaku Iwao	Japan	68.29	71.00	72.65	72.65	q
7	B	Vikrant Malik	India	66.75	71.15	69.24	71.15	q
8	B	Rin Suzuki	Japan	70.37	65.12	67.41	70.37	q
9	A	Kim Da-ni	South Korea	66.87	x	70.31	70.31	q
10	B	Quan Yukun	China	65.01	70.23	69.46	70.23	q
11	B	Ahn Ha-young	South Korea	68.97	63.45	70.00	70.00	q
12	A	Anuj Kalera	India	69.49	67.29	69.28	69.49	q
13	A	Spyros Savva	Cyprus	65.59	69.43	65.09	69.43	
14	A	Noel Kovács	Hungary	69.43	x	63.61	69.43	
15	A	Zhang Jialiang	China	62.86	66.67	66.71	66.71	
16	B	Mubanga Chishimba	Zambia	58.95	x	49.48	58.95	

=== Final ===
Rank	Name	Nationality	#1	#2	#3	#4	#5	#6	Result	Notes
1st place, gold medalist(s)	Edis Matusevičius	Lithuania	75.04	74.51	73.94	77.09	80.37	78.18	80.37	
2nd place, silver medalist(s)	Cyprian Mrzygłód	Poland	71.14	71.50	x	78.16	80.02	77.46	80.02	
3rd place, bronze medalist(s)	Topias Laine	Finland	68.55	72.13	78.42	x	75.44	74.50	78.42	
4	Rin Suzuki	Japan	74.29	73.03	73.02	75.92	74.81	78.41	78.41	PB
5	Yusaku Iwao	Japan	x	68.45	67.35	66.05	74.58	x	74.58	
6	Quan Yukun	China	63.76	72.78	x	x	x	–	72.78	
7	Emin Öncel	Turkey	71.20	x	x	72.49	70.09	–	72.49	
8	Vikrant Malik	India	69.01	65.49	69.71	68.62	70.81	x	70.81	
9	Jakub Kubínec	Slovakia	59.69	x	67.14				67.14	
10	Ahn Ha-young	South Korea	67.10	x	x				67.10	
11	Anuj Kalera	India	60.93	63.68	66.87				66.87	
12	Kim Da-ni	South Korea	65.88	64.52	x				65.88	
