= Athletics at the 2021 Summer World University Games – Women's hammer throw =

The women's hammer throw event at the 2021 Summer World University Games was held on 3 and 5 August 2023 at the Shuangliu Sports Centre Stadium in Chengdu, China.

== Medalists ==
Gold	Silver	Bronze
Li Jiangyan; China	Xu Xinying; China	Aleksandra Śmiech; Poland

== Results ==
=== Qualification ===
Qualification: Qualifying performance 67.00 (Q) or at least 12 best performers (q) advance to the final.

Rank	Group	Name	Nationality	#1	#2	#3	Result	Notes
1	A	Li Jiangyan	China	x	68.76		68.76	Q
2	B	Xu Xinying	China	66.92	66.98	–	66.98	q
3	B	Aleksandra Śmiech	Poland	66.37	x	x	66.37	q
4	A	Raika Murakami	Japan	59.18	63.63	60.86	63.63	q
5	B	Olena Khamaza	Ukraine	61.08	x	62.43	62.43	q
6	A	Yu Ya-chien	Chinese Taipei	61.40	62.17	x	62.17	q
7	A	Kiira Väänänen	Finland	57.71	61.64	61.98	61.98	q
8	B	Cecilia Desideri	Italy	59.45	x	56.71	59.45	q
9	B	Margaretha Cumming	South Africa	x	56.81	58.42	58.42	q
10	A	Grace Wong Xiu Mei	Malaysia	57.70	55.63	57.58	57.70	q
11	B	Sara Forssell	Sweden	x	x	57.41	57.41	q
12	A	Leandri Geel	South Africa	x	x	56.33	56.33	q
13	B	Tanya Chaudhary	India	x	54.27	47.63	54.27	
14	B	Shiloh Corrales Nelson	Philippines	50.78	51.67	52.59	52.59	
15	A	Maya Maya	India	51.59	x	x	51.59	
16	A	Weranga Loku Pattiyage	Sri Lanka	39.32	41.10	36.74	41.10	SB
17	A	Uzma Azam	Pakistan	33.21	x	35.57	35.57	

=== Final ===
Rank	Name	Nationality	#1	#2	#3	#4	#5	#6	Result	Notes
1st place, gold medalist(s)	Li Jiangyan	China	70.77	67.89	69.96	x	69.68	71.20	71.20	
2nd place, silver medalist(s)	Xu Xinying	China	69.45	67.20	67.69	66.35	68.33	67.89	69.45	
3rd place, bronze medalist(s)	Aleksandra Śmiech	Poland	64.31	68.30	66.34	67.46	x	68.65	68.65	
4	Yu Ya-chien	Chinese Taipei	60.66	61.83	59.23	63.92	63.22	66.46	66.46	
5	Olena Khamaza	Ukraine	59.81	x	62.43	x	64.97	x	64.97	SB
6	Raika Murakami	Japan	62.02	59.59	59.40	x	x	x	62.02	
7	Kiira Väänänen	Finland	61.82	61.60	60.80	60.46	61.50	60.13	61.82	
8	Sara Forssell	Sweden	60.18	61.49	x	61.27	61.08	x	61.49	
9	Leandri Geel	South Africa	54.10	59.93	57.82				59.93	
10	Margaretha Cumming	South Africa	x	57.79	x				57.79	
11	Grace Wong Xiu Mei	Malaysia	54.05	57.12	57.52				57.52	
12	Cecilia Desideri	Italy	50.39	x	x				50.39	
