= Benoît Campion =

French track and field athlete

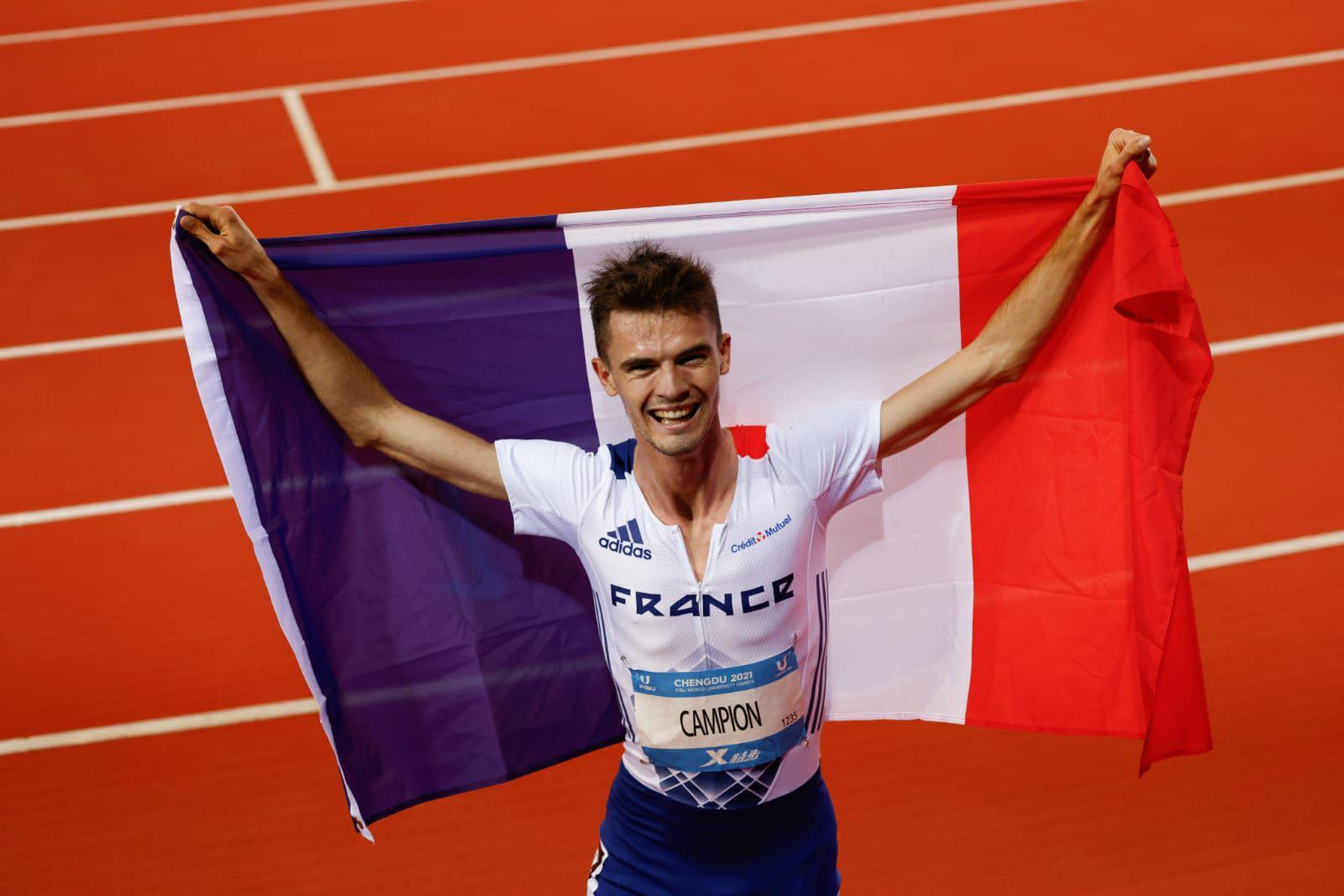

Personal information
- National team: Équipe de France d'athlétisme
- Born: 12 February 1998 (age 28) Brest

Sport
- Country: France
- Sport: Athletics
- Event(s): 800 metres, 1500 metres, Cross-country
- University team: American International College
- Club: Stade Brestois Athlétisme
- Turned pro: 2024
- Coached by: Éric Kerjean (2012-2013) Robert Cariou (2013-2018) Leo Mayo (2018-2020) Sébastien Gamel (2020...)

Achievements and titles
- World finals: World Champion at FISU Games
- Personal bests: 800 m: 1:49.43 (2023); 1500 m: 3:34.34 (2023)
Medal record
Summer World University Games
Gold medal – first place	2021 Chengdu	1500 m

Benoît Campion (born 12 February 1998) is a French track and field athlete, sponsored by New Balance and member of the Stade Brestois Athlétisme

He was the flag bearer at opening ceremony and he won a gold medal in the 1500 metres at the 2021 Summer World University Games.

== Biography ==
=== Young years ===
Benoît was born in Brest, Brittany, on 12 February 1998.

Before he started track and field, he used to play football for the Stade Brestois 29.

After winning some cross-country races at school, he decided to stop playing football and started athletics in 2012.

He joined the Stade Brestois Athlétisme and started doing middle-distance races.

=== 2012-2018 ===
Benoît soon won some cross-country races.

He ran a 2'56''6 on his first 1000m.

He improves his personal bests years after years, showing his talent mainly on 800m and 1500m.

In the same time, he studies medicine at Brest University (UBO).

=== 2018-2020 ===
After 2 years of studying medicine, he decides to focus on track and field and goes to the United Stades, becoming a student athlete at American International College.

By increasing his volume of training, he makes a lot of progress and quickly become one of the best middle-distance runners of the university. He manages to run 3'43 on 1500m that places him among the best French athletes.

=== 2020 ===
COVID-19 forces him to come back to France earlier, and prevents him from competing in the US. He participates to his first "Championnat de France Élite" in September.

=== 2021 ===
He joins the training group coached by Sébastien Gamel in Toulouse.

=== 2022 ===
Tricky season where Benoit struggles to beat his personal best due to some injuries. However, he doesn't give up.

=== 2023 ===
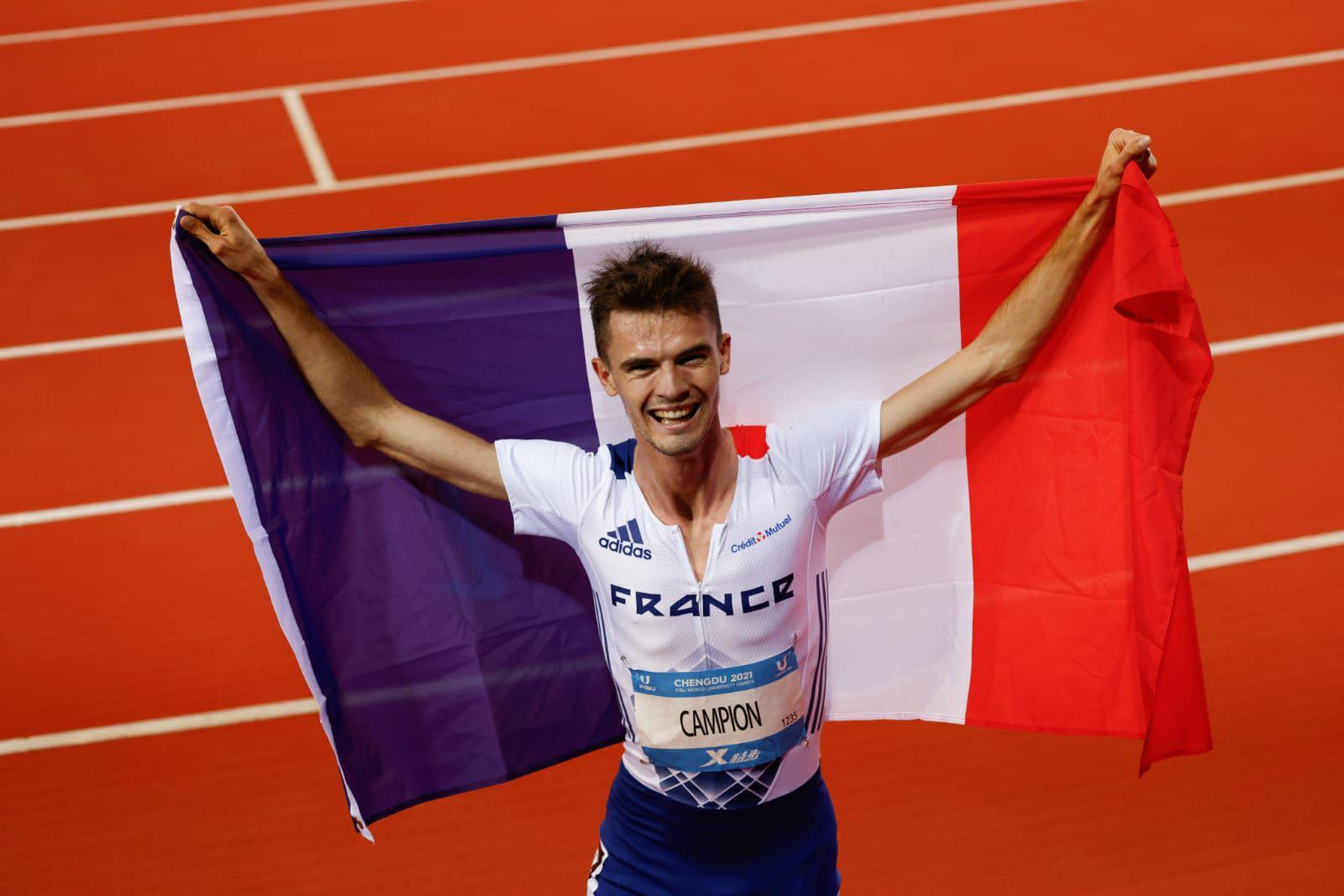
Benoit Campion, World Champion at the FISU Games

He improves a lot his level, smashing his PBs, winning a bronze medal on 1500m at French Indoor Championships and becomes FISU World Champion on the 1500m.

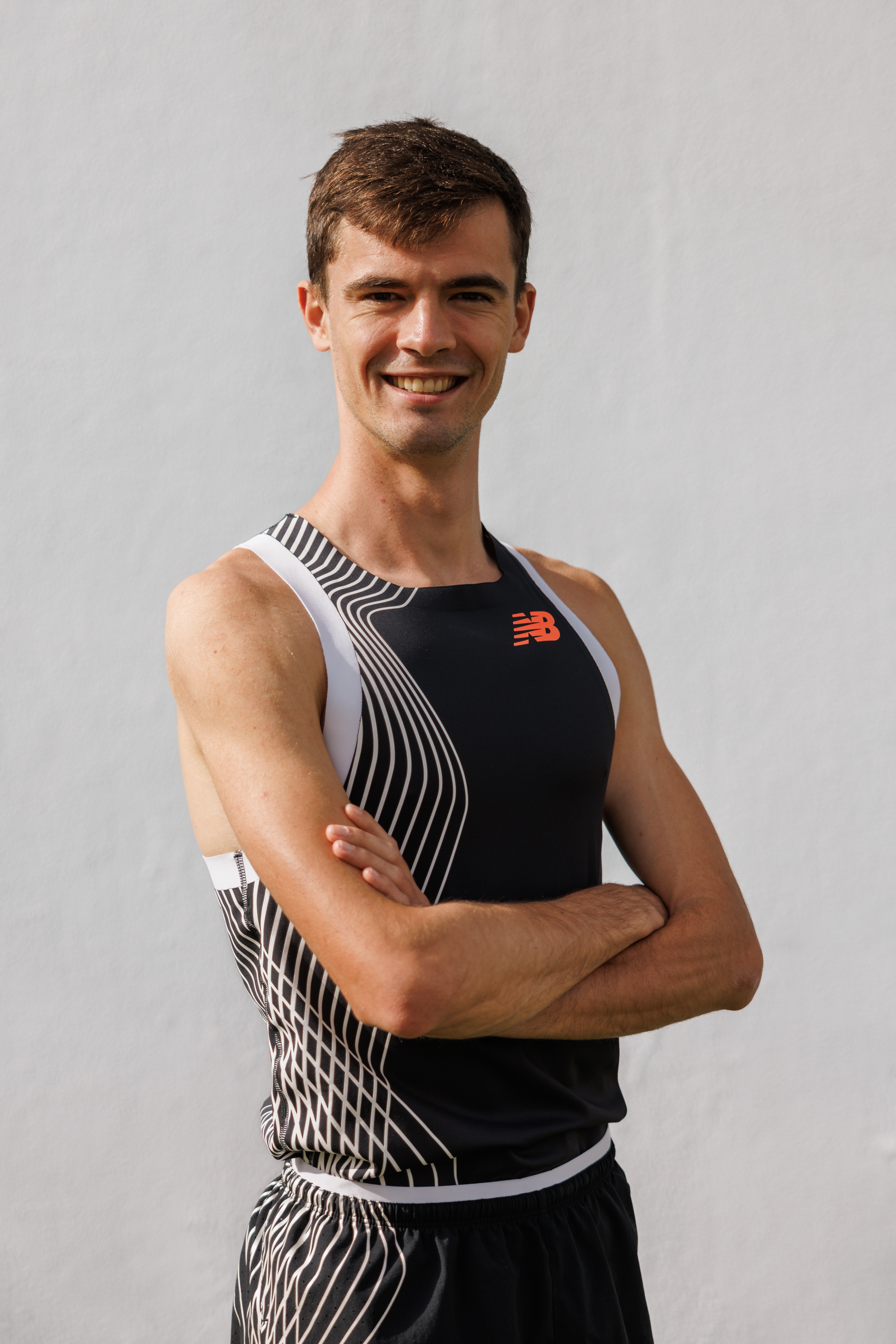
Benoit Campion, professional runner

=== 2024 ===
In January 2024, Benoit turns professional by signing a 4-year contract with New Balance and wins a new bronze medal at French Indoor Championships on the 1500m race.
