= Athletics at the 2021 Summer World University Games – Men's 10,000 metres =

The men's 10,000 metres event at the 2021 Summer World University Games was held on 2 August 2023 at the Shuangliu Sports Centre Stadium in Chengdu, China.

== Medalists ==
Gold	Silver	Bronze
Dismas Yeko; Uganda	Sezgin Ataç; Turkey	Yuito Yamamoto; Japan

== Results ==
Rank	Athlete	Nation	Time	Notes
1st place, gold medalist(s)	Dismas Yeko	Uganda	28:59.25	
2nd place, silver medalist(s)	Sezgin Ataç	Turkey	29:06.62	
3rd place, bronze medalist(s)	Yuito Yamamoto	Japan	29:22.95	
4	Kelvin Chepsigor	Kenya	29:36.99	
5	Chen Tianyu	China	29:43.44	
6	Ömer Amaçtan	Turkey	29:51.09	
7	Ayetullah Aslanhan	Turkey	30:09.86	
8	Chen Zhongping	China	30:10.74	
9	Chris Mhlanga	South Africa	30:25.03	
10	Robi Syianturi	Indonesia	30:26.03	
11	Wang Wenjie	China	30:30.17	
12	Themba Thingane	South Africa	31:27.91	
13	Pradeep Kumar	India	31:32.40	
14	Rohit Kumar	India	34:03.75	
—	Sam Cheptegei	Uganda	DNF	
—	Said Ameri	Algeria	DNF	
—	Seth Akampa	Uganda	DQ	TR6.3.1
—	Taha Erraouy	Morocco	DNS	
—	Abdelhakim Abouzouhir	Morocco	DNS	
—	Aimad Mhimdat	Morocco	DNS	
