= Aliaksei Katkavets =

Belarusian javelin thrower (born 1998)

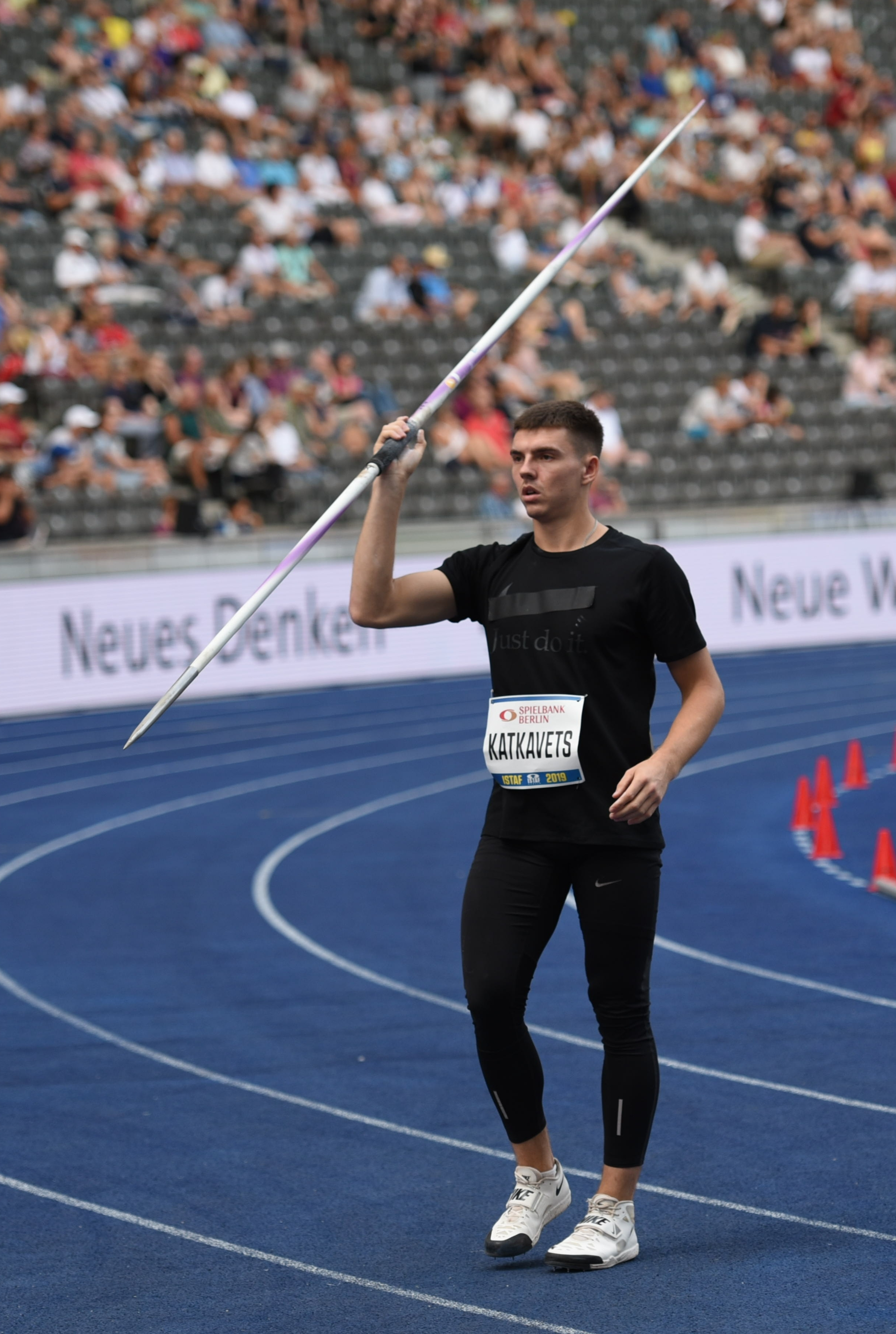
- Katkavets at ISTAF Berlin 2019

Personal information
- Born: 7 June 1998 (age 28)

Sport
- Country: Belarus
- Sport: Track and field
- Event: Javelin throw
Medal record
Men's javelin throw
Representing Belarus
European Athletics U23 Championships
Bronze medal – third place	2019 Gävle	Javelin throw

Aliaksei Vasilevich Katkavets (Belarusian: Аляксей Васільевіч Каткавец; born 7 June 1998) is a Belarusian track and field athlete competing in the javelin throw. He competed in the men's javelin throw event at the 2020 Summer Olympics held in Tokyo, Japan. In 2019, he competed in the men's javelin throw at the 2019 World Athletics Championships in Doha, Qatar. He did not qualify to compete in the final.

In 2019, he won the bronze medal in the men's javelin throw at the 2019 European Athletics U23 Championships held in Gävle, Sweden.
