= Athletics at the 2021 Summer World University Games – Men's shot put =

The men's shot put event at the 2021 Summer World University Games was held on 2 August 2023 at the Shuangliu Sports Centre Stadium in Chengdu, China.

== Medalists ==
Gold	Silver	Bronze
Konrad Bukowiecki; Poland	Szymon Mazur; Poland	Xaver Hastenrath; Germany

== Results ==
Rank	Name	Nationality	#1	#2	#3	#4	#5	#6	Result	Notes
1st place, gold medalist(s)	Konrad Bukowiecki	Poland	17.63	19.96	19.74	19.80	20.23	x	20.23	SB
2nd place, silver medalist(s)	Szymon Mazur	Poland	x	17.40	19.19	x	19.20	18.62	19.20	
3rd place, bronze medalist(s)	Xaver Hastenrath	Germany	x	17.81	x	18.39	x	18.69	18.69	
4	Xing Jialiang	China	17.99	18.57	18.65	18.33	18.62	18.31	18.65	
5	Chen Chengyu	China	18.34	18.45	18.34	18.26	18.30	18.22	18.45	
6	Samardeep Gill	India	16.48	17.84	17.76	17.68	x	x	17.84	
7	Lee Sung-bin	South Korea	17.64	17.38	x	x	x	17.70	17.70	PB
8	Balázs Tóth	Hungary	17.04	x	17.39	x	17.16	x	17.39	
9	Stefan Wieland	Switzerland	x	17.33	x				17.33	
10	Sahib Singh	India	16.21	16.46	16.98				16.98	
11	Sebastian Löschner	Sweden	x	14.94	16.15				16.15	
