= Morocco at the 2021 Summer World University Games =

- Flag of Morocco
- IOC code: MAR

in Chengdu, China 28 July 2023 – 8 August 2023
- Competitors: 6 (5 men and 1 woman)
- Medals: Gold 0 Silver 0 Bronze 0 Total 0

Summer World University Games appearances
- 1959; 1961; 1963; 1965; 1967; 1970; 1973; 1975; 1977; 1979; 1981; 1983; 1985; 1987; 1989; 1991; 1993; 1995; 1997; 1999; 2001; 2003; 2005; 2007; 2009; 2011; 2013; 2015; 2017; 2019; 2021; 2025; 2027

Morocco competed at the 2021 Summer World University Games in Chengdu, China held from 28 July to 8 August 2023.

== Competitors ==
Sport	Men	Women	Total
Athletics	5	1	6

== Athletics ==
Men

Athlete	Event	Heat		Semi-finals		Final	
Athlete	Event	Result	Rank	Result	Rank	Result	Rank
Abdelhakim Abouzouhir	10,000 metres	Did not start					
Abdelhakim Abouzouhir	3000 metres steeplechase	Did not start					
Taha Erraouy	10,000 metres	Did not start					
Anass Essayi	1500 metres	Did not start					
Fouad Messaoudi	1500 metres	Did not start					
Aimad Mhimdat	10,000 metres	Did not start					

Women

Athlete	Event	Heat		Semi-finals		Final	
Athlete	Event	Result	Rank	Result	Rank	Result	Rank
Hanane Bouaggad	10,000 metres	Did not start					
