= Sweden at the 2021 Summer World University Games =

- Flag of Sweden
- IOC code: SWE

in Chengdu, China 28 July 2023 – 8 August 2023
- Competitors: 13 (10 men and 3 women)
- Medals: Gold 0 Silver 0 Bronze 0 Total 0

Summer World University Games appearances
- 1959; 1961; 1963; 1965; 1967; 1970; 1973; 1975; 1977; 1979; 1981; 1983; 1985; 1987; 1989; 1991; 1993; 1995; 1997; 1999; 2001; 2003; 2005; 2007; 2009; 2011; 2013; 2015; 2017; 2019; 2021; 2025; 2027

Sweden competed at the 2021 Summer World University Games in Chengdu, China held from 28 July to 8 August 2023.

== Competitors ==
Sport	Men	Women	Total
Athletics	6	1	7
Diving	0	1	1
Swimming	4	1	5
Total	10	3	13

== Athletics ==
Men
Track

Athlete	Event	Heat		Semi-finals		Final	
Athlete	Event	Result	Rank	Result	Rank	Result	Rank
Eric Källman	1500 metres	3:54.59 SB	17	—N/a		Did not advance	
Gustav Karlsson	400 metres hurdles	52.62	23	Did not advance			
Nils Magnusson	1500 metres	3:43.19	4 Q	—N/a		3:42.65	8
Samuel Wiik	400 metres hurdles	53.14	27	Did not advance			

Field

Athlete	Event	Qualification		Final	
Athlete	Event	Result	Rank	Result	Rank
Sebastian Löschner	Shot put	—N/a		16.15	11
Ivar Moisander	Hammer throw	59.13	17	Did not advance	

Women
Field

Athlete	Event	Qualification		Final	
Athlete	Event	Result	Rank	Result	Rank
Sara Forssell	Hammer throw	57.41	11 q	61.49	8

== Diving ==
Athlete	Event	Preliminaries		Semifinals		Final	
Athlete	Event	Points	Rank	Points	Rank	Points	Rank
Nina Janmyr	Women's 1 metre springboard	216.90	11 Q	237.90	1 Q	221.70	7
Nina Janmyr	Women's 1 metre springboard	239.85	10 Q	267.30	5 Q	247.55	5
Nina Janmyr	Women's team	—N/a				456.75	11

== Swimming ==
Men

Athlete	Event	Heat		Semi-finals		Final	
Athlete	Event	Time	Rank	Time	Rank	Time	Rank
Jacob Danielsson	50 metre freestyle	23.33	24	Did not advance			
Jacob Danielsson	100 metre freestyle	51.45	34	Did not advance			
Jacob Danielsson	50 metre butterfly	24.42	17	Did not advance			
Bengt Holmquist	50 metre freestyle	23.32	22	Did not advance			
Bengt Holmquist	100 metre freestyle	50.35	16 Q	50.06	14	Did not advance	
Bengt Holmquist	200 metre freestyle	1:52.32	20	Did not advance			
Albin Lövgren	50 metre butterfly	24.09	11 Q	24.10	12	Did not advance	
Albin Lövgren	100 metre butterfly	53.92	18	Did not advance			
Sven Törnqvist	50 metre backstroke	25.69	18	Did not advance			
Sven Törnqvist	100 metre backstroke	56.32	23	Did not advance			
Sven Törnqvist	200 metre backstroke	2:05.34	15 Q	2:04.47	14	Did not advance	
Sven Törnqvist	200 metre individual medley	Disqualified		Did not advance			
Jacob Danielsson; Bengt Holmquist; Albin Lövgren; Sven Törnqvist	4 × 100 metre freestyle relay	3:21.85	8 Q	—N/a		3:21.88	8
Jacob Danielsson; Bengt Holmquist; Albin Lövgren; Sven Törnqvist	4 × 100 metre medley relay	3:46.11	13	Did not advance			

Women

Athlete	Event	Heat		Semi-finals		Final	
Athlete	Event	Time	Rank	Time	Rank	Time	Rank
Klara Thormalm	50 metre freestyle	26.33	19	Did not advance			
Klara Thormalm	50 metre breaststroke	31.97	5 Q	32.05	7 Q	32.15	8
Klara Thormalm	100 metre breaststroke	1:10.13	5 Q	1:10.09	9	Did not advance	
Klara Thormalm	200 metre breaststroke	2:36.34	13 Q	Withdraw		Did not advance	
