= Yoshino Sato (volleyball) =

Japanese volleyball player (born 2001)

Personal information
- Full name: Yoshino Sato
- Nationality: Japanese
- Born: 12 November 2001 (age 24) Chiba City, Chiba, Japan
- Education: University of Tsukuba
- Height: 1.78 m (5 ft 10 in)
- Weight: 62 kg (137 lb)
- Spike: 305 cm (120 in)

Volleyball information
- Position: Outside Hitter
- Current club: (Japan) NEC Red Rockets Kawasaki
- Number: 5 (national); 5 (club)

Career
- Years: Team
- 2017–2020 2020–2024 2024–2026 2026–: (Japan) Keiai Gakuen High School (Japan) University of Tsukuba (Japan) NEC Red Rockets Kawasaki (Italy) Vero Volley Milano

National team
- Years: Team
- 2022–: Japan
Honours
Women's volleyball
Representing Japan
AVC Continental Championship
Bronze medal – third place	2026 Tianjin	Team
FISU World University Games
Silver medal – second place	2021 Chengdu	Team

Yoshino Sato (佐藤 淑乃, Sato Yoshino; born 12 November 2001) is a Japanese professional volleyball player. She plays in the SV.League for NEC Red Rockets Kawasaki.

== Personal life ==
Yoshino's older sister, Ayano Sato is also a volleyball player. Both sisters play in the SV.League.

== Career ==
Yoshino was selected for the Japan women's national volleyball team in 2022 while she was a third year student at University of Tsukuba. She was also selected for 2022 Nations League. She often served as a pinch server. She also selected as one of 14 players for the final round. Although Japan lost to Brazil in the quarter final, she scored nine points. She was also selected for the 2022 World Championship in the same year.

In 2023, she was selected to represent Japan at the 2021 FISU World University Games in Chengdu where the team won silver medal. In the same year, she contributed to the University of Tsukuba's first victory in four years at the All Japan Intercollegiate Championship. She received an offer from NEC Red Rockets and made her debut for the 2023-24 V.League Division 1 Women's season.

In 2024, she changed her jersey number from 22 to 2 for the 2024–25 SV.League Women's season, taking over from Sarina Koga who retired after 2024 Paris Olympics.

Sato has signed with Italian powerhouse Vero Volley Milano for the 2026/2027 season, which will mark her first overseas club experience.

== Awards ==
=== Individual ===
- 2021 FISU World University Games - Best Scorer
- 2021 FISU World University Games - Best Spiker
- 2021 FISU World University Games - Best Outside Hitter
- 2024 Asian Women's Club Volleyball Championship - MVP
- 2024–25 SV.League Women's - Best 6

=== University Team ===
- 2020-21 All Japan Intercollegiate Championship - - Bronze medal, with University of Tsukuba
- 2020-21 Kanto University Autumn League - - Runner-up, with University of Tsukuba
- 2021-22 All Japan Intercollegiate Championship - - Bronze medal, with University of Tsukuba
- 2021-22 Kanto University Autumn League - - Champion, with University of Tsukuba
- 2022-23 Kanto University Autumn League - - Runner-up, with University of Tsukuba
- 2022-23 Kanto University Spring League - - Runner-up, with University of Tsukuba
- 2022-23 East Japan Intercollegiate Championship - - Bronze medal, with University of Tsukuba
- 2023-24 All Japan Intercollegiate Championship - - Champion, with University of Tsukuba
- 2023-24 Kanto University Autumn League - - Champion, with University of Tsukuba
- 2023-24 Kanto University Spring League - - Champion, with University of Tsukuba
- 2023-24 East Japan Intercollegiate Championship - - Runner-up, with University of Tsukuba

=== Club Team ===
- 2023-24 Empress's Cup Championship - - Champion, with NEC Red Rockets Kawasaki
- 2023-24 V.League Division 1 Women's - - Champion, with NEC Red Rockets Kawasaki
- 2024 Asian Women's Club Volleyball Championship - - Champion, with NEC Red Rockets Kawasaki
- 2024–25 SV.League Women's - - Runner-up, with NEC Red Rockets Kawasaki
- 2025-26 Empress's Cup Championship - - Runner-up, with NEC Red Rockets Kawasaki

=== National Team ===
- (China) 2021 FISU World University Games - - Champion
- (China) 2026 Asian Championship - - Bronze Medal
