= Tsukasa Nakagawa =

Japanese volleyball player (born 2000)

Personal information
- Full name: Tsukasa Nakagawa
- Nationality: Japanese
- Born: 13 August 2000 (age 26) Osaka, Japan
- Education: Tokai University
- Height: 1.59 m (5 ft 3 in)
- Weight: 57 kg (126 lb)
- Spike: 265 cm (104 in)
- Block: 265 cm (104 in)

Volleyball information
- Position: Setter
- Current club: (Japan) NEC Red Rockets Kawasaki
- Number: 22 (national); 10 (club)

Career
- Years: Team
- 2016–2019 2019–2023 2023-present: (Japan) Kinrankai High School (Japan) Tokai University (Japan) NEC Red Rockets Kawasaki

National team
- Years: Team
- 2017–: Japan
Honours
Women's volleyball
Representing Japan
Asian Championship
Bronze medal – third place	2023 Nakhon Ratchasima	Team
Asian Games
Silver medal – second place	2022 Hangzhou	Team
FISU World University Games
Silver medal – second place	2021 Chengdu	Team
U20 World Championship
Gold medal – first place	2019 Mexico	team
Asian U18 Championship
Gold medal – first place	2017 Chongqing	team

Tsukasa Nakagawa (中川 つかさ, Nakagawa Tsukasa; born 13 August 2000) is a Japanese professional volleyball player. She plays in the SV.League for NEC Red Rockets Kawasaki.

== Personal life ==
Tsukasa started playing volleyball in the third grade of elementary school. Her mother is an amateur volleyball player.

== Career ==
=== Early Years ===
In her second and third year of high school, Tsukasa contributed to the team's consecutive victories in the 70th and 71st All Japan High School Championship (Haruko).

In 2019, she was selected for Japan U-20 National Team to compete in 2019 FIVB Volleyball Women's U20 World Championship in Mexico where the team won the championship. She was named the Best Setter

She then enrolled at Tokai University. She was selected to represent Japan at 2021 FISU World University Games.

She served as captain in her fourth year. The team achieved remarkable success of becoming the first university team to reach the semi-final of the 70th Kurowashiki All Japan Volleyball Tournament. She was named as Rookie of the Year.

After that, the team achieved a quadruple crown, winning the Kanto University Autumn & Spring Championship, East Japan Intercollegiate Championship, and All Japan Intercollegiate Championship. In her final All Japan Intercollegiate Championship, she won the championship for the second consecutive year and was named as the MVP.

=== Professional Years ===
In December 2022, NEC Red Rockets announced that she would join the team for 2023 season.

In 2023, she was selected for the Japan women's national volleyball team for the first time.

== Award ==
=== Individual ===
- 2019 U20 World Championship - Best Setter
- 2021-22 Kurowashiki All Japan Volleyball Tournament - Rookie of the Year
- 2021-22 All Japan Intercollegiate Championship - Best Setter
- 2022-23 All Japan Intercollegiate Championship - Best Setter, MVP
- 2022-23 Kanto University Autumn League - Best Setter, MVP
- 2022-23 Kanto University Spring League - Best Setter, MVP
- 2022-23 East Japan Intercollegiate Championship - Best Setter, MVP

=== High School Team ===
- 2016-17 All Japan High School Championship - - Bronze Medal, with Kinrankai High School
- 2017-18 All Japan High School Championship - - Champion, with Kinrankai High School
- 2018-19 All Japan High School Championship - - Champion, with Kinrankai High School

=== University Team ===
- 2019-20 All Japan Intercollegiate Championship - - Bronze Medal, with Tokai University
- 2019-20 Kanto University Autumn League - - Champion, with Tokai University
- 2020-21 All Japan Intercollegiate Championship - - Runner-up, with Tokai University
- 2021-22 Kurowashiki All Japan Volleyball Tournament - - Bronze Medal, with Tokai University
- 2021-22 All Japan Intercollegiate Championship - - Champion, with Tokai University
- 2021-22 Kanto University Autumn League - - Runner-up, with Tokai University
- 2022-23 All Japan Intercollegiate Championship - - Champion, with Tokai University
- 2022-23 Kanto University Autumn League - - Champion, with Tokai University
- 2022-23 Kanto University Spring League - - Champion,with Tokai University
- 2022-23 East Japan Intercollegiate Championship - - Champion, with Tokai University

=== Club Team ===
- 2022-23 Kurowashiki All Japan Volleyball Tournament - - Bronze Medal, with NEC Red Rockets
- 2022-23 Empress' Cup All Japan Volleyball Championship - - Champion, with NEC Red Rockets
- 2022-23 V.League Division 1 Women's - - Champion, with NEC Red Rockets
- 2023-24 AVC Champions League - - Champion, with NEC Red Rockets
- 2023-24 Empress' Cup All Japan Volleyball Championship - - Champion, with NEC Red Rockets
- 2023-24 V.League Division 1 Women's - - Champion, with NEC Red Rockets
- 2024-25 SV.League Women's - - Runner-up, with NEC Red Rockets Kawasaki
- 2025-26 Empress' Cup All Japan Volleyball Championship - - Runner-up, with NEC Red Rockets Kawasaki

=== National Team ===
- (China) 2017 Asian Girls' U18 Volleyball Championship - - Champion
- (Mexico) 2019 FIVB Volleyball Women's U20 World Championship - - Champion
- (China) 2021 FISU World University Games - - Runner-up
- (China) 2022 Asian Games - - Runner-up
- (Thailand) 2023 Asian Championship - - Bronze Medal
