= Aleksandra Śmiech =

Polish athlete (born 1997)

Personal information
- Nationality: Polish
- Born: 2 October 1997 (age 28)

Sport
- Country: Poland
- Sport: Athletics
- Event: Hammer throw
Medal record
Women's athletics
Representing Poland
Summer World University Games
Bronze medal – third place	2021 Chengdu	Hammer throw

Aleksandra Śmiech (born 2 October 1997) is a Polish hammer thrower. She represented Poland at the 2023 World Athletics Championships and won a bronze medal at the 2021 Summer World University Games.

== Biography ==
From Antoniówka, Radom County, Śmiech is a member of Agros Zamość and is coached by Mikołaj Rosa. In May 2023, she made a hammer throw over 70 metres for the first time, and in June improved again with a new personal best of 71.14 metres in Geneva. Shortly afterwards, she won her fifth consecutive Polish University title.

Competing at the delayed 2021 Summer World University Games held in Chengdu, China, in August 2023, Śmiech won the bronze medal in the women's hammer throw. She also had a third place finish that year behind Malwina Kopron and Anita Włodarczyk at the Polish Athletics Championships, and represented Poland at the 2023 World Athletics Championships in Budapest.

Śmiech had an eighth place finish representing Poland at the 2024 European Throwing Cup in Portugal in March 2024, with a throw of 67.12 metres. She had fourth place finish at the 2025 Polish Championships in Bydgoszcz with a throw of 66.23 metres.

in June 2026, Śmiech threw over 70 metres again to win a competition in Malaga, Spain with a distance of 70.84 metres. In July, she finished runner-up to Włodarczyk at the 2026 Polish Athletics Championships. In August, Śmiech qualified for the final of the game throw at the 2026 European Athletics Championships in Birmingham, having thrown 68.93 metres in the preliminary round, prior to placing eighth overall in the final.
