= Cyprian Mrzygłód =

Polish javelin thrower (born 1998)

Personal information
- Born: 2 February 1998 (age 28) Skaratki pod Rogóźno, Łódź Voivodeship, Poland
- Height: 1.83 m (6 ft 0 in)
- Weight: 77 kg (170 lb)

Sport
- Sport: Athletics
- Event: Javelin throw
- Club: UKS Błyskawica Domaniewice (2012–2014); AZS-AWFiS Gdańsk (2016–)
- Coached by: Mieczysław Szymajda; Leszek Walczak
Medal record
Athletics
Representing Poland
European Throwing Cup
Bronze medal – third place	2025 Nicosia	Javelin Throw
European U23 Championships
Gold medal – first place	2019 Gävle	Javelin throw
World University Games
Silver medal – second place	2021 Chengdu	Javelin throw

Cyprian Mrzygłód (pronounced [ˈt͡sɨp.rjan ˈmʐɨɡ.wut]; born 2 February 1998) is a Polish athlete specialising in the javelin throw. He won the gold medal at the 2017 European U20 Championships. In his senior major international debut he finished ninth at the 2018 European Championships.

His personal best in the event is 85.92 metres set in Kuortane in 2025.

== International competitions ==
Year	Competition	Venue	Position	Event	Notes
Representing Poland
2015	World Youth Championships	Cali, Colombia	16th (q)	Javelin throw (700 g)	69.52 m
2016	World U20 Championships	Bydgoszcz, Poland	9th	Javelin throw	70.48 m
2017	European U20 Championships	Grosseto, Italy	1st	Javelin throw	80.52 m
2018	European Throwing Cup (U23)	Leiria, Portugal	3rd	Javelin throw	74.55 m
2018	European Championships	Berlin, Germany	9th	Javelin throw	80.20 m
2019	European U23 Championships	Gävle, Sweden	1st	Javelin throw	84.97 m
2021	Olympic Games	Tokyo, Japan	20th (q)	Javelin throw	78.33 m
2023	World University Games	Chengdu, China	2nd	Javelin throw	80.02 m
2023	World Championships	Budapest, Hungary	15th (q)	Javelin throw	78.49 m
2024	European Championships	Rome, Italy	16th (q)	Javelin throw	77.93 m
2024	Olympic Games	Paris, France	23rd (q)	Javelin throw	78.50 m
2025	World Championships	Tokyo, Japan	16th (q)	Javelin throw	81.47 m
