= Dismas Yeko =

Ugandan track and field athlete

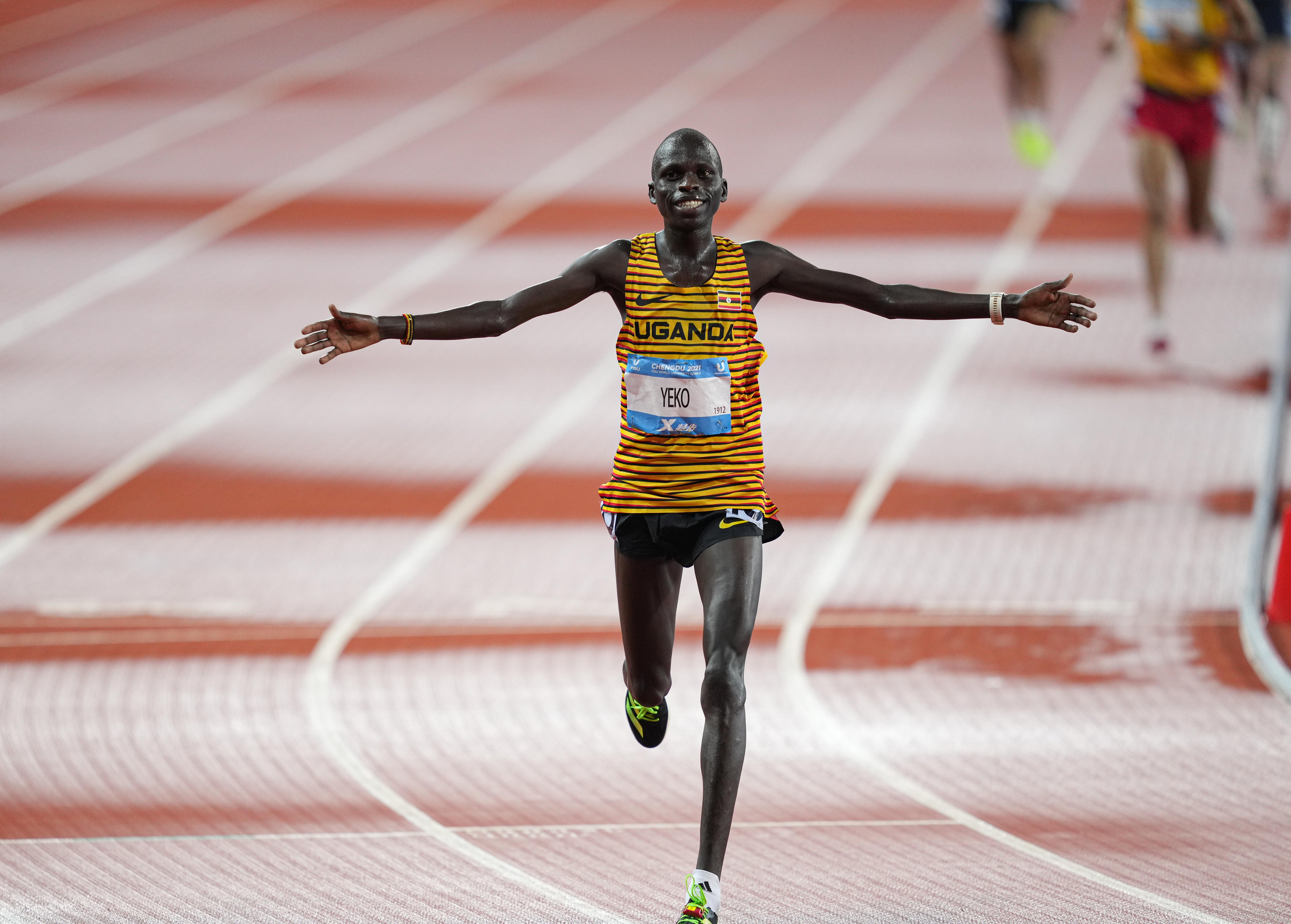
- Victory in the men's 10,000m final at the 31st FISU Summer World University Games in Chengdu, China.

Personal information
- Born: 9 October 2004 (age 21)

Sport
- Country: Uganda
- Sport: Athletics
- Event(s): 5000 metres, 10,000 metres

Achievements and titles
- Personal bests: 5000 m: 14:05.05 (2022); 10,000 m: 28:33.00 (2022)
Medal record
Summer World University Games
Gold medal – first place	2021 Chengdu	10,000 m

Dismas Yeko (born 9 October 2004) is a Ugandan long-distance runner.

He is studying at the Ndejje University. He won a gold medal in the 10,000 metres at the 2021 Summer World University Games.
