= Alicja Grabka =

Polish volleyball player (born 1998)

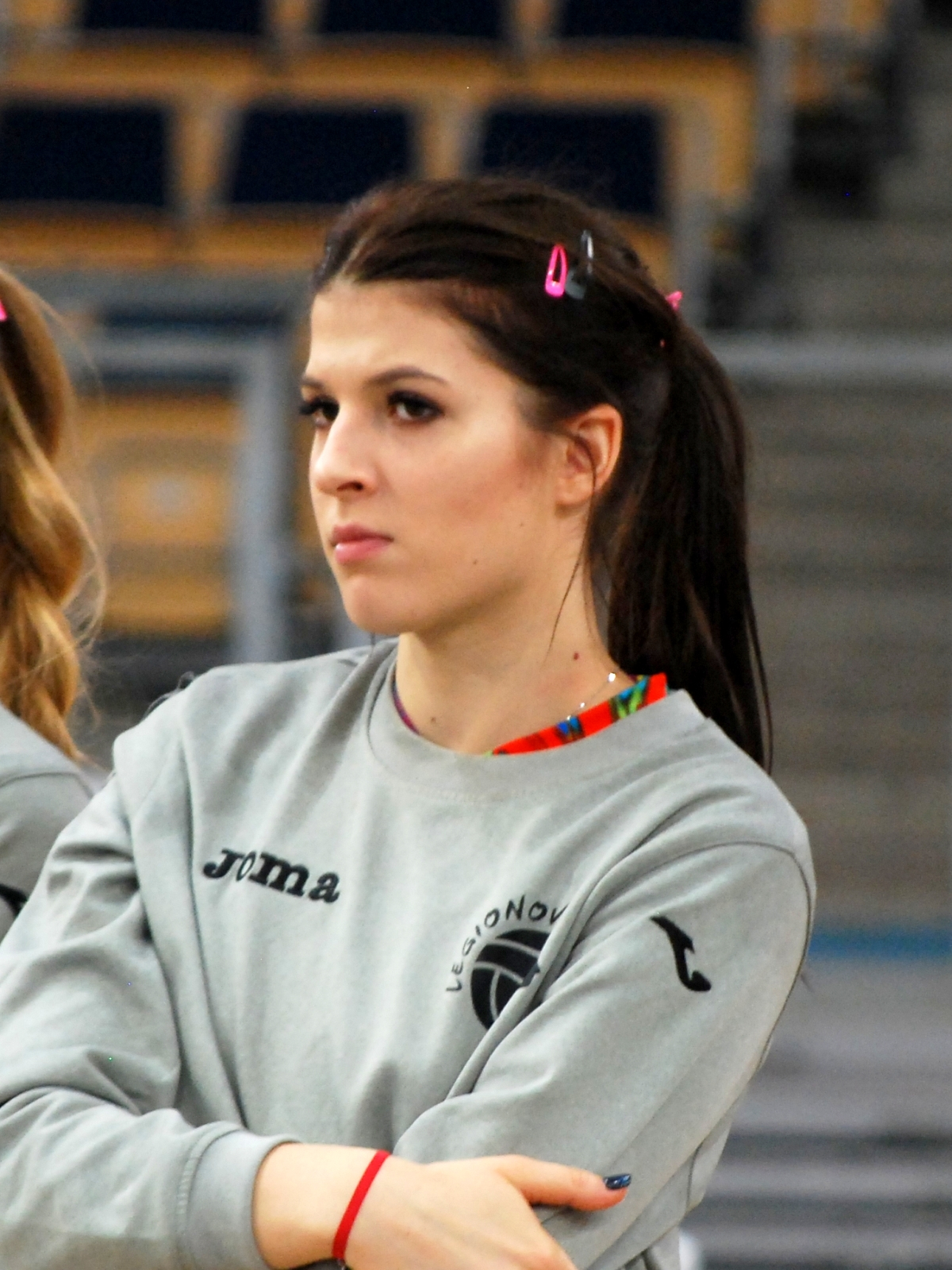

Personal information
- Nationality: Polish
- Born: 9 May 1998 (age 28)
- Height: 178 cm (70 in)
- Weight: 62 kg (137 lb)
- Spike: 290 cm (114 in)
- Block: 280 cm (110 in)

Volleyball information
- Position: Setter
- Number: 18 (national team)

Career
Years	Teams
2018–	E.Leclerc Radomka Radom

National team
2018–	Poland
Honours
World University Games
Bronze medal – third place	2021 Chengdu

Alicja Grabka (born 9 May 1998) is a Polish volleyball player. She is part of the Poland women's national volleyball team.

She participated in the 2017 FIVB Volleyball Women's U20 World Championship, and 2018 FIVB Volleyball Women's Nations League. On club level she played for E.Leclerc Radomka Radom.
