= Kornelia Moskwa =

Polish volleyball player (born 1996)

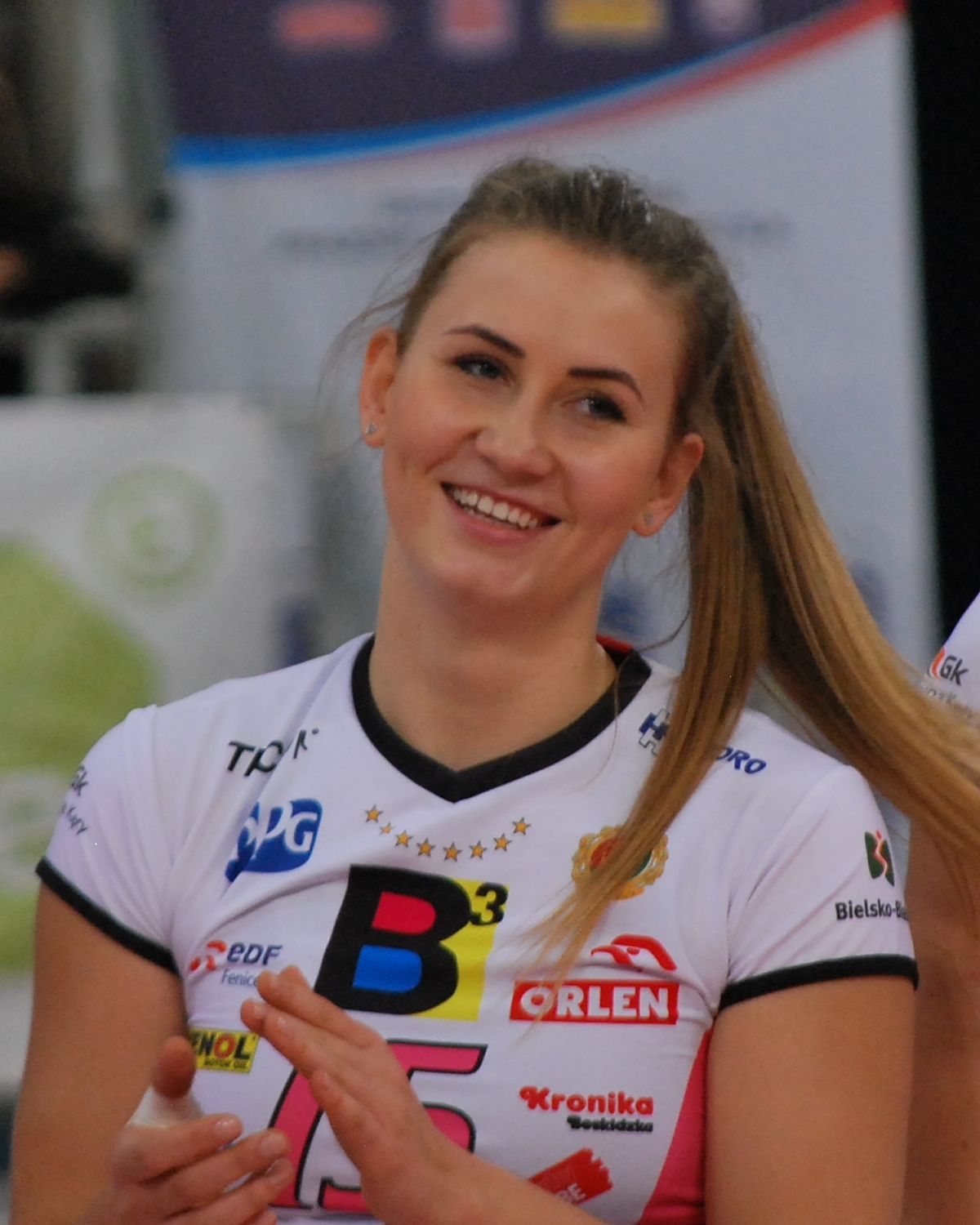
Kornelia Moskwa in 2015

Kornelia Moskwa (born 30 October 1996 in Ruda Śląska) is a Polish volleyball player. She plays for BKS Stal Bielsko-Biała in the TAURON Liga.
