= Małgorzata Śmieszek =

Polish volleyball player (born 1996)

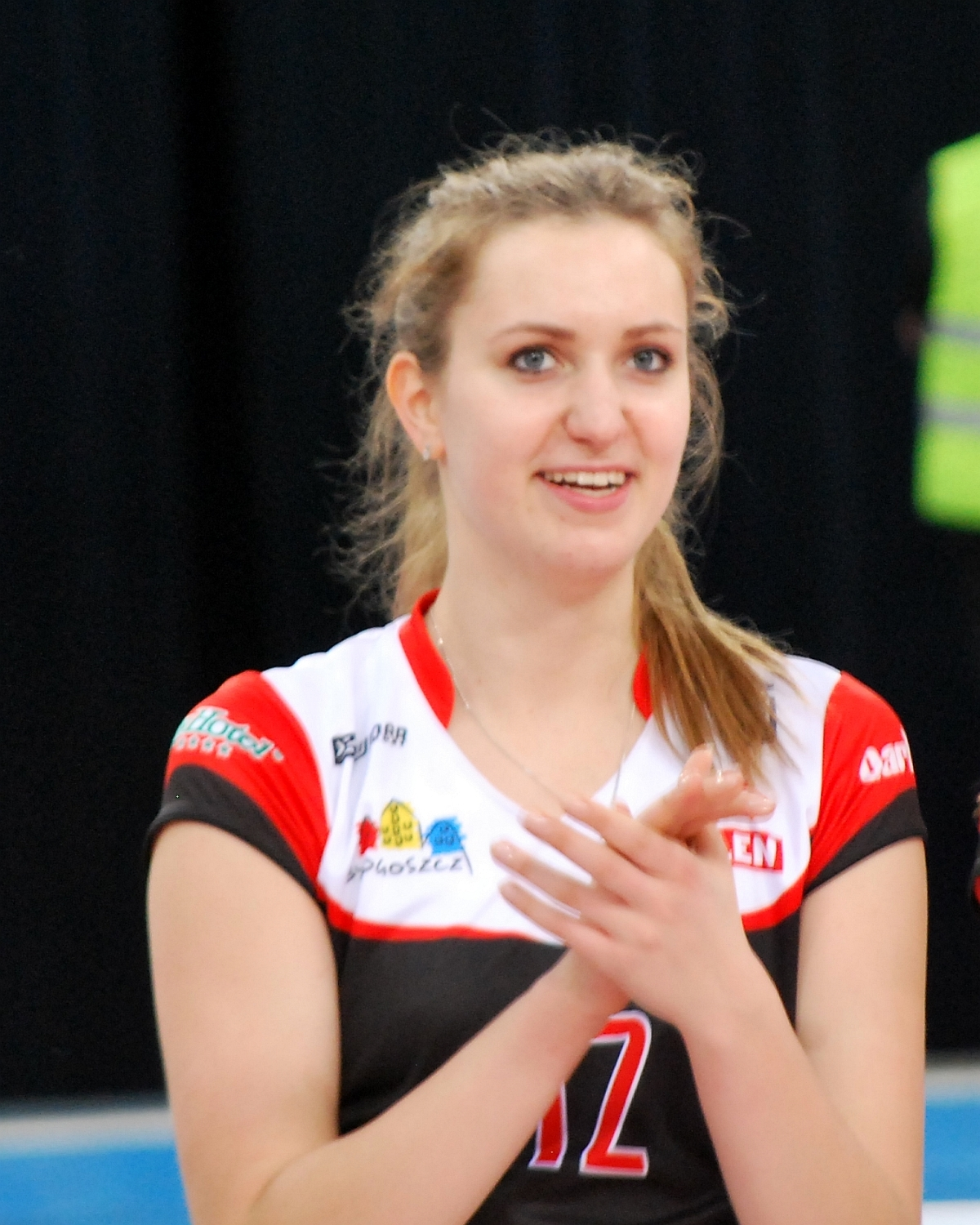
Śmieszek in 2015

Małgorzata Śmieszek (born 11 July 1996) is a Polish volleyball player. She plays for KC Pałac Bydgoszcz in the Orlen Liga.

Śmieszek was part of the winning Polish team at the 2013 Girls' Youth European Volleyball Championship.
