= Nursultan Keneshbekov =

Kyrgyzstani long-distance runner

Personal information
- Nationality: Kyrgyzstani
- Born: 25 March 2000 (age 26) Chok-Tal, Kyrgyzstan

Sport
- Sport: Athletics
- Event: 5000 m

Achievements and titles
- Personal bests: Outdoor; 1500 m: 3:43.76 (Minsk 2021); 3000 m: 8:04.49 (Bursa 2021) NR; 5000 m: 13:52.68 (Bursa 2021); Indoor; 1500 m: 3:46.50 (Mogilyov 2022) NR; 3000 m: 7:57.61 (Mogilyov 2022) NR
Medal record
Men's athletics
Representing Kyrgyzstan
Asian Indoor Championships
Gold medal – first place	2024 Tehran	1500 m
Gold medal – first place	2024 Tehran	3000 m
Silver medal – second place	2026 Tanjijn	1500 m
Silver medal – second place	2026 Tanjijn	3000 m
Summer World University Games
Bronze medal – third place	2021 Chengdu	5000 m

Nursultan Keneshbekov (born 25 March 2000) is a Kyrgyzstani long-distance runner. He competed in the 5000 metres at the 2020 Summer Olympics.
