= Pola Nowakowska =

Polish volleyball player (born 1996)

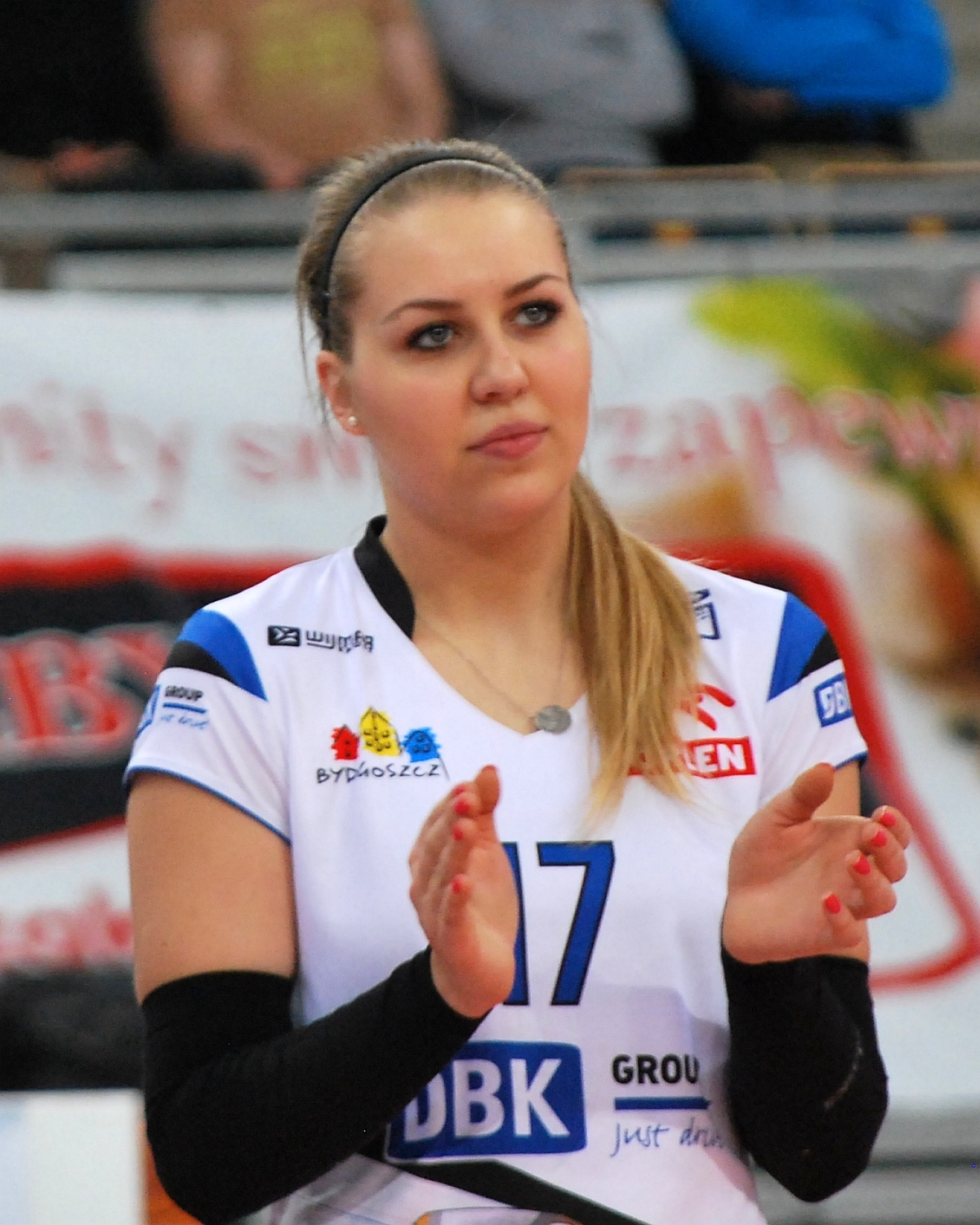
Nowakowska in 2015

Pola Nowakowska (born 30 January 1996) is a Polish volleyball player. She plays for KC Pałac Bydgoszcz in the Orlen Liga.

Nowakowska represented Poland at the 2013 Girls' Youth European Volleyball Championship, where she won the gold medal and was named Best Receiver.

Her older brother, Jan, is also a volleyball player.
