= Brazil at the 2015 Summer Universiade =

- IOC code: BRA
- NOC: Brazilian University Sports Confederation
- Website: www.cbdu.org.br

in Gwangju
- Competitors: 203 in 19 sports
- Flag bearer: Kemily Matias
- Medals Ranked 23rd: Gold 2 Silver 2 Bronze 4 Total 8

Summer Universiade appearances (overview)
- 1959; 1961; 1963; 1965; 1967; 1970; 1973; 1975; 1977; 1979; 1981; 1983; 1985; 1987; 1989; 1991; 1993; 1995; 1997; 1999; 2001; 2003; 2005; 2007; 2009; 2011; 2013; 2015; 2017; 2019; 2021; 2025; 2027

Brazil sent a team of 203 athletes to compete in the 2015 Summer Universiade held in Gwangju, South Korea from July 3 to 17, 2013.

== Medalists ==
Medal	Name	Sport	Event	Date
Gold	Henrique Martins	Swimming	50m butterfly	5 July
Gold	Henrique Martins	Swimming	100m freestyle	8 July
Silver	Gabriela Chibana	Judo	-48 kg	7 July
Silver	Henrique Martins	Swimming	50m freestyle	10 July
Bronze	Gustavo Assis	Judo	Middleweight	5 July
Bronze	Phelipe Pelim	Judo	-48 kg	7 July
Bronze	Gabriela Chibana; Sibilla Faccholli; Flávia Gomes; Talita Morais; Amanda Oliveira; Jéssica Santos; Eleudis Valentim	Judo	Women's Team	8 July
Bronze	Maicon de Andrade	Taekwondo	Men's +87 kg	11 July

== Medals by sports ==
Medals by sport
Sport	1st place, gold medalist(s)	2nd place, silver medalist(s)	3rd place, bronze medalist(s)	Total
Swimming	2	1	0	3
Judo	0	1	3	4
Taekwondo	0	0	1	1
Total	2	2	4	7

== Aquatics ==
=== Swimming ===
Men

Event	Athletes	Heats		Semifinal		Final	
Event	Athletes	Time	Position	Time	Position	Time	Position
50 m freestyle	Henrique Martins	22.63	5	22.25	3	22.24	2nd place, silver medalist(s)
100 m freestyle	Henrique Martins	49.96	5	49.37	2	48.98	1st place, gold medalist(s)
50 m backstroke	Henrique Martins	25.75	3=	25.75	8	25.57	5
50 m breaststroke	Raphael Rodrigues	27.62	5	27.87	7	27.89	6
50 m breaststroke	Felipe Moni	28.29	20	Did not advance			
100 m breaststroke	Raphael Rodrigues	1:02.41	5	Did not advance			
100 m breaststroke	Pedro Henrique Cardona	1:02.84	6	Did not advance			
200 m breaststroke	Felipe Moni	2:21.49	1	Did not advance			
50 m butterfly	Henrique Martins	23.38	1	23.46	2	23.22	1st place, gold medalist(s)
100 m butterfly	Henrique Martins	52.57	1	53.33	10	Did not advance	

=== Water Polo ===
Men

Group A

Team	Pld	W	D	L	GF	GA	GD	Pts
Hungary	6	5	1	0	67	36	+31	11
Australia	6	4	1	1	62	39	+23	9
France	6	4	0	2	64	62	+2	8
Italy	6	3	0	3	66	49	+17	6
Netherlands	6	3	0	3	77	53	+24	6
Brazil	6	1	0	5	41	78	-37	2
South Korea	6	0	0	6	31	91	-60	0

4 July; 17:00	Report	Netherlands	18–6	Brazil	Yeomju Indoor Aquatics Center, Gwangju; Referees: Zhang Liang (CHN); Yosuke Kjiwara (JPN)
4 July; 17:00	Report	Score by quarters: 5–2, 5–1, 2–1, 6–2			Yeomju Indoor Aquatics Center, Gwangju; Referees: Zhang Liang (CHN); Yosuke Kjiwara (JPN)

5 July; 15:30	Report	Brazil	10–14	France	Yeomju Indoor Aquatics Center, Gwangju; Referees: Zhang Liang (CHN); Ivanka Rakovic Krstonosic (SRB)
5 July; 15:30	Report	Score by quarters: 4–4, 2–4, 2–4, 2–2			Yeomju Indoor Aquatics Center, Gwangju; Referees: Zhang Liang (CHN); Ivanka Rakovic Krstonosic (SRB)

6 July; 18:30	Report	Brazil	7–16	Italy	Yeomju Indoor Aquatics Center, Gwangju; Referees: Ziliang Chen (CHN); Ogino Hiroaki (JPN)
6 July; 18:30	Report	Score by quarters: 3–3, 1–4, 2–5, 1–4			Yeomju Indoor Aquatics Center, Gwangju; Referees: Ziliang Chen (CHN); Ogino Hiroaki (JPN)

7 July; 18:30	Report	Brazil	11–7	South Korea	Yeomju Indoor Aquatics Center, Gwangju; Referees: Dragan Stampalija (CRO); Ziliang Chen (CHN)
7 July; 18:30	Report	Score by quarters: 3–1, 3–2, 2-2, 3–2			Yeomju Indoor Aquatics Center, Gwangju; Referees: Dragan Stampalija (CRO); Ziliang Chen (CHN)

8 July; 17:00	Report	Hungary	13–3	Brazil	Yeomju Indoor Aquatics Center, Gwangju; Referees: Zhang Liang (CHN); Ogino Hiroaki (JPN)
8 July; 17:00	Report	Score by quarters: 4-0, 3-1, 2-1, 4-1			Yeomju Indoor Aquatics Center, Gwangju; Referees: Zhang Liang (CHN); Ogino Hiroaki (JPN)

10 July; 18:30	Report	Australia	10–4	Brazil	Yeomju Indoor Aquatics Center, Gwangju; Referees: Yosuke Kajiwara (JPN); Joseph Peila (USA)
10 July; 18:30	Report	Score by quarters: 0-2, 5-1, 4-1, 1-0			Yeomju Indoor Aquatics Center, Gwangju; Referees: Yosuke Kajiwara (JPN); Joseph Peila (USA)

== Archery ==
Men

Athlete	Event	Ranking Round		Round of 32	Round of 16	Quarterfinals	Semifinals	Final / BM	Rank
Athlete	Event	Score	Seed	Opposition Score	Opposition Score	Opposition Score	Opposition Score	Opposition Score	Rank
Gustavo Viola	Compound Individual	658	44	Sanati (IRN); L 133-139	Did not advance				
Rodrigo Mattei	Recurve Individual	572	66	Faldzinski (POL); L 4-6	Did not advance				

Women

Athlete	Event	Ranking Round		Round of 32	Round of 16	Quarterfinals	Semifinals	Final / BM	Rank
Athlete	Event	Score	Seed	Opposition Score	Opposition Score	Opposition Score	Opposition Score	Opposition Score	Rank
Dalylla do Nascimento	Recurve Individual	517	57	Miranda (BRA); W 6-5	Sugimoto (JPN); L 0-6	Did not advance			
Isabella Miranda	Recurve Individual	524	56	Nascimento (BRA); L 5-6	Did not advance				

== Athletics ==
Men
Track & road events

Athlete	Event	Heat		Semifinal		Final	
Athlete	Event	Result	Rank	Result	Rank	Result	Rank
Arthur Terezan	400 m hurdles	50.78 Q	6	50.18 Q			

Field events

Athlete	Event	Qualification		Final	
Athlete	Event	Distance	Position	Distance	Position
Kaum Bento	Triple jump	14.99	15	Did not advance	
Jonathan Henrique Silva	Triple jump	15.55 q	12		

Key

- Note–Ranks given for track events are within the athlete's heat only
- Q = Qualified for the next round
- q = Qualified for the next round as a fastest loser or, in field events, by position without achieving the qualifying target
- NR = National record
- N/A = Round not applicable for the event
- Bye = Athlete not required to compete in round
- NM = No mark

== Badminton ==
Mixed

Athlete	Event	Group stage				Quarterfinal	Semifinal	Final / BM	
Athlete	Event	Opposition Score	Opposition Score	Opposition Score	Rank	Opposition Score	Opposition Score	Opposition Score	Rank
Ana Campos; Gabriela Santos; Leonardo Alkimin; Luiz Santos Jr.	Team	(Finland) FIN; L 0-5	(Malaysia) MAS; L 0-5	(Hong Kong) HKG; L 1-3	4				

== Basketball ==
Men

Group D

Team	Pld	W	L	PF	PA	PD	Pts
United States	4	4	0	319	235	+84	8
Brazil	4	3	1	311	230	+81	7
Serbia	4	3	1	253	193	+60	7
Turkey	4	1	3	227	249	−22	5
Switzerland	4	1	3	216	274	−58	5
Chile	4	0	4	165	310	−145	4

4 July 2015

Report

Brazil	78–33	Chile
Scoring by quarter: 20-4, 18-11, 19-6, 21-12

Yeonggwang Sportium Gymnasium

5 July 2015

Report

Brazil	72–81	United States
Scoring by quarter: 13-12, 15-28, 16-19, 28-22

Dongkang College Gymnasium

7 July 2015

Report

Switzerland	57–100	Brazil
Scoring by quarter: 6-32, 22-22, 16-23, 13-23

Yeonggwang Sportium Gymnasium

8 July 2015
17:30

Report

Brazil	61–59	Turkey
Scoring by quarter: 21–10, 7–12, 23–21, 10–16

Dongkang College Gymnasium

9 July 2015
18:00

Report

Serbia	65–70	Brazil
Scoring by quarter: 18-18, 14-2, 13-16, 20-34

Muan Indoor Gymnasium

Women

Group D

Team	Pld	W	L	PF	PA	PD	Pts
Australia	3	3	0	290	133	+157	6
Chinese Taipei	3	2	1	248	213	+35	5
Brazil	3	1	2	214	230	−16	4
Uganda	3	0	3	145	321	−176	3

5 July 2015

Report

Chinese Taipei	86–81	Brazil
Scoring by quarter: 16-24, 27-13, 20-24, 23-20

Yeonggwang Sportium Gymnasium

6 July 2015

Report

Brazil	40–85	Australia
Scoring by quarter: 11-19, 7-20, 12-20, 10-26

Gwangju University Gymnasium

7 July 2015

Report

Brazil	93–59	Uganda
Scoring by quarter: 31-12, 18-16, 21-15, 23-16

Yeonggwang Sportium Gymnasium

9th to 16th place

6 July 2015

Report

Brazil	72–65	Mexico
Scoring by quarter: 22-12, 13-20, 16-22, 14-18

Gwangju University Gymnasium

13th to 16th place

== Fencing ==
Men

Athlete	Event	Pool Round		Round of 64	Round of 32	Round of 16	Quarterfinals	Semifinals	Final / BM	
Athlete	Event	Result	Seed	Opposition Score	Opposition Score	Opposition Score	Opposition Score	Opposition Score	Opposition Score	Rank
Henrique Marques	Individual foil	1-5	5	A Rattan (GBR); L 9-15	Did not advance					
Luiz Fernando Rodrigues	Individual épée	2-3	5	J Jie (MAS); L 8-15	Did not advance					

Women

Athlete	Event	Pool Round		Round of 32	Round of 16	Quarterfinals	Semifinals	Final / BM	
Athlete	Event	Result	Seed	Opposition Score	Opposition Score	Opposition Score	Opposition Score	Opposition Score	Rank
Naira Ferreira	Individual épée	0-6	7	Did not advance					
Nicole Camozzato									

== Football ==
Men

Group C

Team	Pld	W	D	L	GF	GA	GD	Pts
Japan	3	3	0	0	7	1	+6	9
Brazil	3	2	0	1	7	4	+3	6
Malaysia	3	1	0	2	2	6	−4	3
Iran	3	0	0	3	3	8	−5	0

2 July 2015
16:30

Malaysia	1 – 2	Brazil
Syahrul 77' (pen.)	Report	Lustosa Nascimento 22' da Silva 35' (pen.)

Gochang Public Stadium
Referee: (Canada) Drew Fischer

5 July 2015
11:00

Brazil	0 – 1	Japan
	Report	Hayama Go 66'

Yeonggwang Sportium Football Field
Referee: (Malta) Borg Marco

7 July 2015
11:00

Brazil	5–2	Iran
Pedro Augusto 50' 62' 71'; Luiz Cleber 64'; José Leopoldo 82'	Report	Seyedali Fatemi 30'; Mohammad Osanikord 69'

Gochang Public Stadium
Referee: (Mexico) Aguirre Santander

Quarterfinals

9 July 2015
16:30

South Africa	1–2	Brazil
Mogotsi 15'	Report	Luiz Cleber 31'; Pedro Augusto 64'

Yeonggwang Sportium Football Field
Referee: (Chinese Taipei) Ming-hsun Yu

Semifinals

11 July 2015
16:30

South Korea	2–0	Brazil
Lee Hyun-sung 56'; Jung Won-jin 64'	Report

Yeonggwang Sportium Football Field
Referee: Marco Borg (Malta)

Bronze-medal match

13 July 2015
16:00

Brazil	0–0	Japan
	Report
Penalties
Kuhn (penalty scored); Ribeiro (penalty scored); Santos (penalty scored); Marques (penalty scored); Aniceto (penalty scored); Lucas (penalty scored); Dos Santos (penalty missed)	6–7	Goya (penalty scored); Hasegawa (penalty scored); Muroya (penalty scored); Matsushita (penalty scored); Kimoto (penalty scored); Tagami (penalty scored); Fukushima (penalty scored)

Naju Public Stadium
Referee: Santander Aguirre (Mexico)

Women

Group C

Team	Pld	W	D	L	GF	GA	GD	Pts
Brazil	2	2	0	0	6	0	+6	6
China	2	1	0	1	4	4	0	3
Poland	2	0	0	2	1	7	−6	0
North Korea (W)	0	0	0	0	0	0	0	0

(W) Withdrew
4 July 2015
11:00

Brazil	3 – 0	Poland
Paula 20'; Daiane 75'; Juliana 80'	Report

Naju Public Stadium
Referee: (South Korea) Jiyoung Jung

6 July 2015
11:00

Brazil	3 – 0	China
Thais 42'; Larissa 58'; Thais 81'	Report

Honam University Football Field
Referee: (Uzbekistan) Anna Sidorova

Quarterfinals

8 July 2015
16:30

Brazil	0–1	Russia
	Report	Chernomyrdina 46'

Mokpo International Football Center, Mokpo
Referee: (Chinese Taipei) Yi-chi Lee

5th–8th place

10 July 2015

Czech Republic	0–1	Brazil
	Report	Duarte Guedes 34'

Mokpo International Football Center, Mokpo
Referee: Yoshimi Yamashita (Japan)

5th place game

12 July 2015
16:30

China	2–1	Brazil

Yeonggwang Sportium Football Field

== Golf ==
Men

Player	Event	R1	R2	R3	R4	Total	To par	Place
Daniel Ishii	Individual	79	73					
Luiz Jacintho	Individual	75	72					
Matheus Balestrin	Individual	76	78					
Daniel Ishii; Luiz Jacintho; Matheus Balestrin	Team	151	145					

== Gymnastics ==
=== Artistic ===
Men
Team & Individual Qualification

Athlete	Event	Final							
Athlete	Event	Apparatus						Total	Rank
Athlete	Event	F	PH	R	V	PB	HB	Total	Rank
Fellipe Ferreira	Qualification	12.900	11.150	13.350	14.300	14.600	13.750	80.050	29
Henrique Flores	Qualification	-	12.200	13.900	-	-	13.800	39.900	96
Hudson Miguel	Qualification	12.050	10.500	13.700	13.900	13.200	-	63.350	67
Leonardo Souza	Qualification	12.150	12.550	13.200	14.200	14.100	11.900	78.100	38
Renato Nascimento	Qualification	14.525	-	-	14.500	14.200	12.250	55.475	74
Total	Team	39.575 (17)	35.900 (16)	40.950 (13)	43.000 (6)	42.900 (6)	39.800 (11)	242.125	13

Qualification Legend: Q = Qualified to apparatus final

== Handball ==
Men

Group B

Team	Pld	W	D	L	GF	GA	GD	Pts
Portugal	5	5	0	0	159	120	39	10
Switzerland	5	3	1	1	146	131	15	7
Israel	5	2	1	2	134	143	-9	5
Brazil	5	2	0	3	147	147	0	4
Hungary	5	2	0	3	130	140	–10	4
Japan	5	0	0	5	128	163	–35	0

6 July; 20:00	Brazil	28-31	Switzerland	Gochang County Gymnasium, Gochang
6 July; 20:00	Oliveira, Dutra 6	(9-13)	Raemy 9	Gochang County Gymnasium, Gochang
6 July; 20:00	3× (yellow card) 3× (suspension)	report	3× (yellow card) 2× (suspension)	Gochang County Gymnasium, Gochang

7 July; 20:00	Japan	28-32	Brazil	Naju Indoor Gymnasium, Naju
7 July; 20:00	Agarie 9	(15-14)	Dias 7	Naju Indoor Gymnasium, Naju
7 July; 20:00	2× (yellow card) 2× (suspension)	report	3× (yellow card) 3× (suspension)	Naju Indoor Gymnasium, Naju

9 July; 20:00	Brazil	34–26	Hungary	Gurye Indoor Gymnasium, Gurye
9 July; 20:00	Freitas 6	(15–13)	Bali 8	Gurye Indoor Gymnasium, Gurye
9 July; 20:00	2× (yellow card) 6× (suspension) 1× (red card)	Report	3× (yellow card) 5× (suspension)	Gurye Indoor Gymnasium, Gurye

10 July; 20:00	Israel	28–25	Brazil	Gochang County Gymnasium, Gochang
10 July; 20:00	Kofman 6	(15–12)	Freitas 8	Gochang County Gymnasium, Gochang
10 July; 20:00	3× (yellow card) 2× (suspension)	Report	3× (yellow card) 5× (suspension)	Gochang County Gymnasium, Gochang

12 July; 20:00	Portugal	34–28	Brazil	Gurye Indoor Gymnasium, Gurye
12 July; 20:00	Pombo 6	(19–16)	Ribeiro 5	Gurye Indoor Gymnasium, Gurye
12 July; 20:00	1× (yellow card) 6× (suspension)	Report	4× (yellow card) 2× (suspension)	Gurye Indoor Gymnasium, Gurye

7th place match

13 July; 12:00	Lithuania	25–31	Brazil	Gurye Indoor Gymnasium, Gurye
13 July; 12:00	Dabravicius 6	(16–15)	Oliveira 8	Gurye Indoor Gymnasium, Gurye
13 July; 12:00	3× (yellow card) 2× (suspension)	Report	3× (yellow card) 3× (suspension)	Gurye Indoor Gymnasium, Gurye

Women

Group B

Team	Pld	W	D	L	GF	GA	GD	Pts
Russia	5	5	0	0	178	84	94	10
Czech Republic	5	4	0	1	135	120	15	8
Brazil	5	3	0	2	133	105	28	6
China	5	2	0	3	110	137	–27	4
Slovakia	5	1	0	4	94	116	–22	2
Uruguay	5	0	0	5	73	161	–88	0

6 July; 16:00	Brazil	27-17	China	Naju Indoor Gymnasium, Naju
6 July; 16:00	Rodrigues 6	(13-10)	Huang 5	Naju Indoor Gymnasium, Naju
6 July; 16:00	3× (yellow card) 5× (suspension)	report	3× (yellow card) 4× (suspension)	Naju Indoor Gymnasium, Naju

7 July; 16:00	Uruguay	11-33	Brazil	Gurye Indoor Gymnasium, Gurye
7 July; 16:00	Jaurena 4	(6-13)	Araujo 7	Gurye Indoor Gymnasium, Gurye
7 July; 16:00	2× (yellow card) 5× (suspension)	report	3× (yellow card)	Gurye Indoor Gymnasium, Gurye

9 July; 16:00	Brazil	26-16	Slovakia	Gochang County Gymnasium, Gochang
9 July; 16:00	Costa 5	(15-4)	Kluckova 6	Gochang County Gymnasium, Gochang
9 July; 16:00	3× (yellow card) 4× (suspension)	report	3× (yellow card) 1× (suspension)	Gochang County Gymnasium, Gochang

10 July; 16:00	Czech Republic	29–26	Brazil	Gochang County Gymnasium, Gochang
10 July; 16:00	Kubackova 10	(15–14)	Goncalves 8	Gochang County Gymnasium, Gochang
10 July; 16:00	4× (yellow card)	Report	4× (yellow card) 3× (suspension)	Gochang County Gymnasium, Gochang

12 July; 16:00	Brazil	21–32	Russia	Naju Indoor Gymnasium, Naju
12 July; 16:00	Araújo 5	(9–15)	Makeeva 6	Naju Indoor Gymnasium, Naju
12 July; 16:00	3× (yellow card) 4× (suspension)	Report	3× (yellow card) 5× (suspension)	Naju Indoor Gymnasium, Naju

5th place match

13 July; 12:00	Romania	20–22	Brazil	Gochang County Gymnasium, Gochang
13 July; 12:00	Zamfirescu, Preda 4	(11–11)	Ansolin 4	Gochang County Gymnasium, Gochang
13 July; 12:00	3× (yellow card) 2× (suspension)	Report	3× (yellow card) 5× (suspension)	Gochang County Gymnasium, Gochang

== Judo ==
Men

Athlete	Event	1st Round	Round of 32	Round of 16	Quarterfinals	Semifinals/Repechage	Repechage	Final / BM	
Athlete	Event	Opposition Result	Opposition Result	Opposition Result	Opposition Result	Opposition Result	Opposition Result	Opposition Result	Rank
Phelipe Pelim	−60 kg	Bye		Trikomitis (CYP); W 100S1-000S2	Oguzov (RUS); L 000-100	Li (CHN); W 101S1-000S4	Maita (COL); W 110S1-000	Dagvadorj (MGL); W 100S1-000S2	3rd place, bronze medalist(s)
Marcelo Fuzita	−66 kg	Bye	Sakenuly (KAZ); W 100-000	Ghazaryan (ARM); W 001S3-000S1	Ardanov (RUS); L 001-010S2	Did not advance	Piras (ITA); L 000S1-100	Did not advance	7th
Igor Pereira	−73 kg	Bye	Dabrovski (POL); W 012S2-000S1	Kacimi (ALG); W 100S3-001S1	Yamamoto (JPN); L 000-100	Did not advance	Rahimli (AZE); L 000S2-001	Did not advance	7th
Rafael Macedo	−81 kg	Bottieau (BEL); W 000S1-000S3	Gaid (ALG); W 100-000S1	Ratsimiziva (MAD); W 101-001S1	Martinez (CUB); W 100S1-001S4	Khalmurzaev (RUS); L 010S1-010S3	—N/a	Kohara (JPN); L 000S3-000S2	5th
Gustavo Assis	−90 kg	Bye	Bektursunov (KGZ); W 101-000S1	Lekavicius (LTU); W 000-000S2	Sattorov (UZB); W 001S3-000	Khalmurzaev (RUS); L 010S1-010S3	—N/a	Klammert (CZE); W 100-000S1	3rd place, bronze medalist(s)
Gabriel Souza	−100 kg	Bye	Smith (USA); W 100S1-000S2	Gotō (JPN); L 000S2-000S1	Did not advance		Begz (MGL); W 100-000S1	Pfeiffer (GER); L 000S1-100S1	5th
Juscelino Nascimento	+100 kg	Bye	Mettis (EST); L 101-000S1	Did not advance					

Women

Athlete	Event	Round of 32	Round of 16	Quarterfinals	Semifinals	Repechage	Final / BM	
Athlete	Event	Opposition Result	Opposition Result	Opposition Result	Opposition Result	Opposition Result	Opposition Result	Rank
Gabriela Chibana	−48 kg	Xiong (CHN); W 101-000S1	Schurr (USA); W 110-000	Rezzoug (ALG); W 110-000	Budescu (MDA); W 000-000S2	—N/a	Jeong (KOR); L 000-010S1	2nd place, silver medalist(s)
Eleudis Valentim	−52 kg	Bye	Moretti (ITA); W 000S1-000S2	Uchio (JPN); L 000S3-000	Did not advance	Tschopp (SUI); L 000S2-001	Did not advance	7th
Flavia Gomes	−57 kg	Konkina (RUS); L 000S1-100	Did not advance					
Jessica Santos	−63 kg	Regis (ITA); W 000S1-000S2	Zhang (CHN); L 001-000S1	Did not advance				
Amanda Oliveira	−70 kg	Bye	Swain (USA); W 100-000	Miloua (ALG); W 101-000	Kim (KOR); L 000S2-010S2	—N/a	Kashkyn (KAZ); L 001-011	5th
Talita Morais	-78 kg	Bye	Temmar (ALG); L 000-100S3	Did not advance				
Sibilla Faccholli	+78 kg	Bye	Sun (TPE); W 100S2-000S1	Kang (CHN); L 000S1-100S1	Did not advance	Pakenyte (LTU); L 000S1-100S2	Did not advance	7th

Team

Event	Round of 32	Round of 16	Quarterfinals	Semifinals	Repechage	Final / BM	
Event	Opposition Result	Opposition Result	Opposition Result	Opposition Result	Opposition Result	Opposition Result	Rank
Men's	France; L 1-4	Did not advance					
Women's	Bye	Mongolia; W 3-2	Poland; W 3-2	Japan; L 1-4	—N/a	France; W 3-2	3rd place, bronze medalist(s)

== Rowing ==
Men

Athlete	Event	Heats		Repechage		Final	
Athlete	Event	Time	Rank	Time	Rank	Time	Rank
Jefferson dos Santos	Single sculls	7:57.08	5	7:30.52	4	7:39.52	1 C
Ítalo Barbosa; Alessandro Fernandes	Coxless pair	7:34.32	5	7:27.52	4	Did not advance	

Women

Athlete	Event	Heats		Repechage		Final	
Athlete	Event	Time	Rank	Time	Rank	Time	Rank
Nathalia Pereira	Single sculls	8:40.47	6	8:21.66	5	8:15.02	2 C

== Shooting ==
Men

Event	Athlete	Qualification		Final	
Event	Athlete	Score	Rank	Score	Rank
Trap	Guilherme Maurina	113	13th	Did not advance	
10m air rifle	João Alberto Soares	603.0	45th	Did not advance	
50m rifle prone	João Alberto Soares	616.8	22nd	Did not advance	

Women

Event	Athlete	Qualification		Final	
Event	Athlete	Score	Rank	Score	Rank
25m pistol	Thais Moura	DSQ		Did not advance	
10m air pistol	Thais Moura	368-05x	36th	Did not advance	

== Table Tennis ==
Singles

Athlete	Event	Group stage		Round of 32	Round of 16	Quarterfinals	Semifinals	Final / BM	
Athlete	Event	Opposition Result	Rank	Opposition Result	Opposition Result	Opposition Result	Opposition Result	Opposition Result	Rank
Humberto Manhani Jr.	Men	Awale (NEP); Al Ajami (LIB)							
Danilo Toma	Men	Oueng (CAM) W 3-0; Costa (POR)							
Katia Kawai	Women	Shoji (JPN) L 0-3; Enkhbat (MGL) L 0-3							
Karin Sako	Women	Lee (KOR) L 1-3; Chan (HKG) L 1-3							

Doubles

Athlete	Event	Round of 64	Round of 32	Round of 16	Quarterfinals	Semifinals	Final / BM	
Athlete	Event	Opposition Result	Opposition Result	Opposition Result	Opposition Result	Opposition Result	Opposition Result	Rank
Humberto Manhani Jr. Danilo Toma	Men	Flemming/Ruwen (GER); W 3-2	Kobes/Figel (SVK); W 3-0					
Katia Kawai; Karin Sako	Women	Daubnerova/Balazova (SVK); L 0-3	Did not advance					
Humberto Manhani Jr. Katia Kawai	Mixed	Wong/Chung (HKG); L 2-3	Did not advance					
Danilo Toma; Karin Sako	Mixed	Foo/Ying (MAS); L 2-3	Did not advance					

== Taekwondo ==
Men

Athlete	Event	Round of 32	Round of 16	Quarterfinals	Semifinals	Repechage	Bronze medal	Final	
Athlete	Event	Opposition Result	Opposition Result	Opposition Result	Opposition Result	Opposition Result	Opposition Result	Opposition Result	Rank
Adriano Pereira	–54kg	Atmanegara (INA); W 7-4	Chiu (TPE); L 0-1	Did not advance					

Women

Athlete	Event	Round of 32	Round of 16	Quarterfinals	Semifinals	Repechage	Bronze medal	Final	
Athlete	Event	Opposition Result	Opposition Result	Opposition Result	Opposition Result	Opposition Result	Opposition Result	Opposition Result	Rank
Camila Bezerra	–46kg	Al Harthi (OMA); W WDR	Kouttouki (CYP); L 1-3	Did not advance					
Rafaela de Araújo	–57kg	Nisaisom (THA); L 1-3	Did not advance						

== Tennis ==
Men

Athlete	Event	1st Round	Round of 32	Round of 16	Quarterfinals	Semifinals	Final
Athlete	Event	Opposition Score	Opposition Score	Opposition Score	Opposition Score	Opposition Score	Opposition Score
Tiago Pinheiro	Singles	A Rahman (INA); W 6-3, 6-2	P Ofner (AUT); L 2-6, 2-6	Did not advance			
Victor Maynard	Singles	M Redlicki (USA); L 4-6, 3-6	Did not advance				
Tiago Pinheiro; Victor Maynard	Doubles	Bye	A Rapp/M Redlicki (USA); L 1-6, 2-6	Did not advance			

== Volleyball ==
=== Men ===
Group C

Pos	Team	Pld	W	L	Pts	SW	SL	SR	SPW	SPL	SPR	Qualification
1	Japan	4	4	0	11	12	3	4.000	355	272	1.305	Quarterfinals
2	Chile	4	3	1	8	10	6	1.667	361	330	1.094	Quarterfinals
3	Brazil	4	2	2	7	10	9	1.111	410	408	1.005	9th–16th place
4	Colombia	4	1	3	3	4	10	0.400	270	326	0.828	9th–16th place
5	Hong Kong	4	0	4	1	4	12	0.333	324	384	0.844	17th–21st place

Date	Time		Score		Set 1	Set 2	Set 3	Set 4	Set 5	Total	Report
2 JUL	15:00	Brazil	3–2	Hong Kong	30–28	23–25	24–26	25–13	15–11	117–103	Report
4 JUL	13:00	Brazil	3–1	Colombia	25–21	25–18	18–25	25–18		93–82	Report
6 JUL	15:00	Japan	3–2	Brazil	22–25	25–21	25–20	21–25	15–13	108–104	Report
7 JUL	18:00	Brazil	2–3	Chile	28–26	17–25	15–25	26-24	10-15	96–76	96–115

9th–16th quarterfinals

Date	Time		Score		Set 1	Set 2	Set 3	Set 4	Set 5	Total	Report
9 JUL	13:00	BRA	2–3	South Korea	25–23	25–22	24–26	22–25	15–17	111–113	Report

13th–16th semifinals

Date	Time		Score		Set 1	Set 2	Set 3	Set 4	Set 5	Total	Report
10 JUL	13:00	Brazil	2–3	Venezuela	25–23	20–25	26–24	18–25	13–15	102–112	Report

15th place match

Date	Time		Score		Set 1	Set 2	Set 3	Set 4	Set 5	Total	Report
11 JUL	11:00	Mexico	3–1	Brazil	26–24	25–17	19–25	27–25		97–91	Report

=== Women ===
Group C

Pos	Team	Pld	W	L	Pts	SW	SL	SR	SPW	SPL	SPR	Qualification
1	Japan	3	3	0	8	9	3	3.000	283	257	1.101	Quarterfinals
2	Brazil	3	2	1	7	8	4	2.000	282	235	1.200	Quarterfinals
3	Finland	3	1	2	3	4	7	0.571	236	263	0.897	
4	United States	3	0	3	0	2	9	0.222	221	267	0.828	

Date	Time		Score		Set 1	Set 2	Set 3	Set 4	Set 5	Total	Report
4 JUL	13:00	Finland	1–3	Brazil	17–25	25–21	20–25	16–25		78–96	Report
5 JUL	18:00	Japan	3–2	Brazil	25–23	23–25	27–25	23–25	15–13	113–111	Report
6 JUL	13:15	Brazil	3–0	United States	25–13	25–19	25–12			75–44	Report

Quarterfinals

Date	Time		Score		Set 1	Set 2	Set 3	Set 4	Set 5	Total	Report
8 Jul	13:00	Brazil	3–0	China	25–11	25–15	25–16			75–42	Report

Semifinals

Date	Time		Score		Set 1	Set 2	Set 3	Set 4	Set 5	Total	Report
9 Jul	15:50	Brazil	1–3	Ukraine	21–25	25–20	24–26	23–25		93–96	Report

3rd place match

Date	Time		Score		Set 1	Set 2	Set 3	Set 4	Set 5	Total	Report
11 Jul	16:00	Brazil	1–3	Japan	17–25	27–25	23–25	18–25		85–100	Report

== See also ==
- Brazil at the 2015 Pan American Games
