= Archery at the 2015 Summer Universiade – Men's individual recurve =

The men's individual recurve archery competition at the 2015 Summer Universiade was held in the International Archery Center, Gwangju, South Korea from July 4 to 8, 2015. 68 archers from 32 countries entered the competition. World champion Lee Seung-yun set a new Universiade record in the ranking round.

== Ranking round ==
The ranking round took place on 4 July 2015 to determine the seeding for the knockout rounds. It consisted of two rounds of 36 arrows, with a maximum score of 720.

Rank	Archer	Score	Notes
1	Lee Seung-yun (KOR)	693	UR
2	Ku Bon-chan (KOR)	686	
3	Kim Woo-jin (KOR)	683	
4	Galsan Bazarzhapov (RUS)	673	
5	Wei Chun-heng (TPE)	668	
6	Matthew Zumbo (USA)	666	
7	Juan Ignacio Rodriguez (ESP)	664	
8	Sanzhar Mussayev (KAZ)	663	
9	Yu Guan-lin (TPE)	660	
10	Thomas Antoine (FRA)	660	
11	Wang Hou-chieh (TPE)	659	
12	Bair Tsybekdorzhiev (RUS)	657	
13	Sultan Duzelbayev (KAZ)	657	
14	Ivan Gonzalez Tobias (MEX)	656	
15	Kazuki Yamamoto (JPN)	655	
16	Pawel Marzec (POL)	654	
17	Dan Olaru (MDA)	654	
18	Denis Gankin (KAZ)	653	
19	Massimiliano Mandia (ITA)	652	
20	Jaka Komocar (SLO)	651	
21	Sergio del Olmo (ESP)	650	
22	Hiroto Ozaki (JPN)	650	
23	Artem Makhnenko (RUS)	650	
24	Ashe Morgan (GBR)	650	
25	Ranjith Kumar Muddaraboina (IND)	646	
26	Michael Sanna (FRA)	646	
27	Geoffroy Mortemousque (FRA)	643	
28	Juuso Huhtala (FIN)	640	
29	Muhamad Ikram Bin Joni (MAS)	640	
30	Johan Weiss Hansen (DEN)	639	
31	Dmitri Dancov (MDA)	639	
32	Marco Morello (ITA)	637	
33	Alexander Smith (GBR)	636	
34	Kazuki Ohi (JPN)	636	
35	Den Habjan Malavasic (SLO)	636	
36	Oldair Zamora Lira (MEX)	636	
37	Tero Pyylampi (FIN)	634	
38	Klemen Štrajhar (SLO)	632	
39	Kacper Sierakowski (POL)	631	
40	Sean Chang (USA)	630	
41	Tushar Prabhakar Shelke (IND)	630	
42	Antti Olavi Vikstroem (FIN)	629	
43	Mohd Alif Adha Bin Hassan (MAS)	624	
44	Chan Jor Shing (HKG)	624	
45	Otgonbold Baatarkhuyag (MGL)	624	
46	Narmandakh Batmunkh (MGL)	623	
47	Maciej Faldzinski (POL)	622	
48	Vladimir Hurban (SVK)	622	
49	Olivier Ansiaux (BEL)	621	
50	Somendra (IND)	621	
51	Adrian Faber (SUI)	620	
52	Pearu Jakob Ojamae (EST)	617	
53	Oleg Lacutco (MDA)	617	
54	Enkhsaikhan Enkhtur (MGL)	615	
55	Darren Wallace (IRL)	614	
56	Muhammad Bin Mohd Kamro (MAS)	613	
57	Irvaldi Ananda Putera (INA)	611	
58	Juraj Duchon (SVK)	610	
59	Alberto Fioroli (ITA)	609	
60	Jesper Fredriksson (SWE)	607	
61	Luis Carlos Pissarra (POR)	606	
62	Mikael Danielsson (SWE)	605	
63	Thomas Hall (GBR)	605	
64	Janis Amatnieks (LAT)	604	
65	Kevin Sabado (ARG)	579	
66	Rodrigo Mattei (BRA)	572	
67	David Wolfe (USA)	555	
68	Prakash Gurung (NEP)	532	

== Elimination rounds ==
=== Finals ===
Quarter finals
1	Lee Seung-yun (KOR)	2	2	1	2
9	Yu Guan-lin (TPE)	0	0	1	0
5	Wei Chun-hung (TPE)	2	0	2	2
29	Muhamad Ikram Bin Joni (MAS)	0	2	0	0
3	Kim Woo-jin (KOR)	2	2	1	1
11	Wang Hou-chieh (TPE)	0	0	1	1
10	Thomas Antoine (FRA)	2	0	0	0
2	Ku Bon-chan (KOR)	0	2	2	2

Semi finals
1	Lee Seung-yun (KOR)	2	1	2	2
5	Wei Chun-hung (TPE)	0	1	0	0
3	Kim Woo-jin (KOR)	0	1	2	1	1	0
2	Ku Bon-chan (KOR)	2	1	0	1	1	1

Finals
1	Lee Seung-yun (KOR)	2	2	2
2	Ku Bon-chan (KOR)	0	0	0
Third place
5	Wei Chun-hung (TPE)	0	2	0	0
3	Kim Woo-jin (KOR)	2	0	2	2
