= Gymnastics at the 2015 Summer Universiade – Men's artistic team all-around =

2015 Gymnastics Universiade

Men's artistic team all-around at the 2015 Summer Universiade
- Venue: Gwangju Women's University Universiade Gymnasium
- Date: July 5, 2015
- Competitors: 116 from 36 nations

Medalists
gold medal	Chihiro Yoshioka; Kaito Imabayashi; Naoto Hayasaka; Shogo Nonomura; Yuya Kamoto	Japan
silver medal	Yang Hak-seon; Lee Hyeok-jung; Lee Jun-ho; Park Min-soo; Jo Yeong-gwang	South Korea
bronze medal	Volodymyr Okachev; Ihor Radivilov; Mykyta Yermak; Oleh Vernyayev; Vitalii Arseniev	Ukraine

The Men's artistic team all-around competition Gymnastics at the 2015 Summer Universiade in Gwangju was held on 5 July at the Gwangju Women's University Universiade Gymnasium.

== Schedule ==
All times are Korea Standard Time (UTC+09:00)

Date	Time	Event
Monday, 5 July 2015	11:00	Final

== Results ==
Rank	Team	Floor (gymnastics)	Pommel horse	Rings (gymnastics)	Vault (gymnastics)	Parallel bars	Horizontal bar	Total
1st place, gold medalist(s)	Japan (JPN)	44.300	43.550	44.300	44.700	44.950	44.200	266.000
	Chihiro Yoshioka	13.850	14.250	14.525		15.100	14.350	72.075
	Kaito Imabayashi	13.650	13.700		14.900			42.250
	Naoto Hayasaka	15.550	14.700	14.550	14.800	13.850	13.800	87.250
	Shogo Nonomura	14.900	14.600	14.900	15.000	14.300	15.350	89.050
	Yuya Kamoto			14.850	14.500	15.550	14.500	59.400
2nd place, silver medalist(s)	South Korea (KOR)	42.550	41.150	43.300	44.200	44.300	43.050	258.550
	Yang Hak-seon	0.600		14.600				15.200
	Lee Hyeok-jung	14.100	12.750	14.150	14.450	15.100	14.350	84.900
	Lee Jun-ho	14.600	13.950		14.850	13.550	14.000	70.950
	Park Min-soo	13.850	13.150	14.550	14.850	14.150	14.700	85.250
	Jo Yeong-gwang		14.050	13.550	14.500	15.050	13.750	70.900
3rd place, bronze medalist(s)	Ukraine (UKR)	43.025	39.925	45.650	44.800	45.200	39.525	258.125
	Volodymyr Okachev		12.675			14.900	12.150	39.725
	Igor Radivilov	11.300		15.650	15.150		12.550	54.650
	Mykyta Yermak	14.325	10.850	13.950	14.150	14.250	13.325	80.850
	Oleg Verniaiev	14.950	15.100	15.250	15.250	16.050	13.650	90.250
	Vitalii Arseniev	13.750	12.150	14.750	14.400	14.250		69.300
4	China (CHN)	43.150	39.650	41.500	45.550	44.550	42.800	257.200
	Gu Baisen		13.450	13.100		14.750	14.050	55.350
	Cen Yu	14.200	13.650	13.850	15.550	15.300	14.550	87.100
	Wang Haoran	14.350	10.050		15.050	13.950		53.400
	Wang Peng	14.450	12.550	13.850	14.900	14.500	13.850	84.100
	Huang Xi	14.350		13.800	14.950		14.200	57.300
5	Switzerland (SUI)	43.450	41.275	41.800	42.150	42.350	41.200	252.225
	Christopher Tomcik			14.100	13.700	14.200	12.200	54.200
	Kevin Patrick Rossi	14.600	13.750	13.650	14.000	13.550	14.050	83.600
	Marco Walter	14.850	13.100	0.000	14.250			42.200
	Severin Rohrer	13.600	14.250			14.050	13.150	55.050
	Simon Nuetzi	14.000	13.275	14.050	13.900	14.100	14.000	83.325
6	Russia (RUS)	40.550	41.275	42.000	43.150	43.050	41.900	251.925
	Mikhail Kudashov	14.150	14.150	13.900	14.600	14.250	13.300	84.350
	Alexey Rostov		13.450	12.650			14.450	40.550
	Andrey Cherkasov	13.050			14.250	14.350		41.650
	Daniil Kazachkov	12.800	13.675	14.000	13.600	14.100	14.150	82.325
	Kirill Potapov	13.350	12.550	14.100	14.300	14.450	12.700	81.450
7	France (FRA)	42.050	38.725	42.000	42.600	41.850	42.450	249.675
	Anthony Randrianasolo	13.700	12.175	14.000	13.550	13.950		67.375
	Antoine Borello		13.150		13.950	13.900	14.200	55.200
	Edgar Boulet	13.750		13.600			13.100	40.450
	Kevin Dupuis	12.650	11.650	13.850	14.250	14.000	14.150	80.550
	Mathias Philippe	14.600	13.400	14.150	14.400	13.050	14.100	83.700
8	Belgium (BEL)	41.900	39.800	41.350	42.750	40.150	40.575	246.525
	Bernard Pire	13.650	13.350	13.150	13.450	13.900	13.000	80.500
	Dennis Goossens			13.800				13.800
	Gilles Gentges	13.500	12.500	13.650	13.900	13.350	13.550	80.450
	Maxime Gentges	14.100	13.950	13.900	14.750	12.750	14.025	83.475
	Thibault Hoffreumon	14.150	0.000		14.100	12.900	12.450	53.600
9	Chinese Taipei (TPE)	41.150	39.450	42.100	42.800	40.825	39.800	246.125
	Lee Chih-Kai		11.850	13.300		13.875	13.350	52.375
	Chen Chih-Yu	14.050		15.000	14.450			43.500
	Chen I-Hsiang	13.000	13.950		13.050	13.125	13.600	66.725
	Hsu Ping-Chien	13.650	12.600	13.800	14.150	13.550	12.250	80.000
	Hung Shih-Tung	13.450	12.900	12.650	14.200	13.400	12.850	79.450
10	Kazakhstan (KAZ)	40.450	39.350	42.650	42.600	41.400	39.250	245.700
	Azizbek Kudratullayev			15.100		13.500	12.450	41.050
	Danil Baturin	12.675	10.450		14.300	13.000	12.500	62.925
	Daulet Narmetov	13.600	14.900	13.200	14.000			55.700
	Ilya Kornev	13.050	10.850	13.550	14.050	14.100	13.650	79.250
	Nikolay Nam	13.800	13.600	14.000	14.250	13.800	13.100	82.550
11	Turkey (TUR)	39.800	37.750	42.900	41.400	42.650	40.800	245.300
	Ahmet Önder	12.850	11.750	13.950	14.000	13.100	14.150	79.800
	Ferhat Arıcan	13.800	13.550	13.550	14.600	15.250	13.700	84.450
	Ibrahim Colak	13.150	12.450	15.400	12.800	14.300	12.950	81.050
12	Germany (GER)	41.350	38.900	39.400	41.150	41.375	40.450	242.625
	Fabian Lotz	12.250	13.800	11.800	13.300	13.800	11.900	76.850
	Fabian Hambuechen	14.950	12.250	14.650	14.500	13.950	15.100	85.400
	Helge Liebrich	14.150	12.850	12.950	13.350	13.625	13.450	80.375
13	Brazil (BRA)	39.575	35.900	40.950	43.000	42.900	39.800	242.125
	Fellipe Arakawa	12.900	11.150	13.350	14.300	14.600	13.750	80.050
	Henrique Flores		12.200	13.900			13.800	39.900
	Hudson Miguel	12.050	10.500	13.700	13.900	13.200		63.350
	Leonardo Souza	12.150	12.550	13.200	14.200	14.100	11.900	78.100
	Renato Oliveira	14.525			14.500	14.200	12.250	55.475
14	Great Britain (GBR)	40.175	37.800	39.900	42.875	40.250	39.050	240.050
	Gabriel Hannah	13.700	11.950	13.550	14.300	13.400	12.700	79.600
	Thomas Gibbs	12.575	12.650	12.550	14.525	13.900	13.450	79.650
	William Trood	13.900	13.200	13.800	14.050	12.950	12.900	80.800
15	Australia (AUS)	38.500	35.125	40.100	41.300	41.200	40.700	236.925
	Christopher Bacueti	13.200	11.175		13.300			37.675
	Tyson Leigh Bull	12.050	11.450	13.250	13.500	13.400	14.050	77.700
	Michael Mercieca	13.250	12.500	13.700	13.400	14.250	13.750	80.850
	Mitchell Morgans	11.850	10.850	12.950	14.400	13.550	9.450	73.050
	Trenten Wan			13.150		11.850	12.900	37.900
16	Finland (FIN)	41.650	35.000	41.550	42.250	37.100	37.650	235.200
	Franz Card	12.450	11.650	12.750	12.850	10.600	13.075	73.375
	Heikki Saarenketo	14.650			15.000			29.650
	Kasper Holopainen		10.500	13.050		11.750	13.475	48.775
	Markku Vahtila		12.850	14.250		12.400	11.100	50.600
	Tomi Tuuha	14.550	4.350	14.250	14.400	12.950	10.550	71.050
17	New Zealand (NZL)	40.250	37.550	33.950	39.500	39.300	35.750	226.300
	Callum Phillips	12.400	13.150		12.550	13.500		51.600
	Devy Dyson	13.750	13.200	13.350	13.500	11.950	10.900	76.650
	Leo Gervasio Golder	14.100		9.850	13.450	12.850	13.150	63.400
	Timothy Jones		11.200	10.750		12.950	11.700	46.600
18	Norway (NOR)	40.050	33.150	36.000	42.050	37.150	37.550	225.950
	Kristoffer Andersen	14.000			13.850	11.900	11.500	51.250
	Nikolai Roenbeck	13.000	11.550	11.600	14.150	12.300		62.600
	Odin Kalvo	13.050	12.550	12.350	14.050	12.850	13.200	78.050
	Oliver Udbye			12.050				12.050
	Vetle Talsnes		9.050			12.000	12.850	33.900
19	Uzbekistan (UZB)	39.300	32.650	35.950	40.900	36.550	36.675	222.025
	Abdumalik Khamdamov	13.050	9.900	10.750	13.600	11.550	11.800	70.650
	Aliyor Rustamov	12.200	10.000	11.050	12.550	12.300	11.875	69.975
	Eduard Shaulov	14.050	12.750	12.450	14.500	11.800	13.000	78.550
	Khusniddin Ismoilov	11.950	8.500	12.450	12.800	12.450	11.100	69.250
20	Mongolia (MGL)	38.450	32.050	33.075	41.300	35.500	33.900	214.275
	Enkhtulga Altansukh	11.650	9.800	9.850	13.550	12.050	11.100	68.000
	Erdenebold Ganbat	13.750	11.600	12.425	12.650	7.350	10.650	68.425
	Nomondalai Jamiyankhuu	12.800	10.650	8.800	13.600	11.050	12.150	69.050
	Otgonbat Purevdorj	11.900	9.550	10.800	14.150	12.400	9.150	67.950
21	Croatia (CRO)	13.000	37.450				12.500	62.950
	Andrej Korosteljev	13.000						13.000
	Anton Kovacevic						12.500	12.500
	Kristijan Vugrinski		12.650					12.650
	Leonardo Kusan		11.850					11.850
	Matija Baron		12.950					12.950
Individual
	Akash Modi (USA)	14.700	14.450	13.650	14.500	15.050	14.350	86.700
	Donothan Bailey (USA)	13.200	14.350	13.750	14.500	14.650	12.450	82.900
	Joachim Winther (DEN)	13.150	12.800	12.750	13.450	12.200	11.750	76.100
	Joao Fuglsig (DEN)	10.200	12.200	11.250	13.300	13.300	12.350	72.600
	Brian Francioni (ARG)	12.750	10.350	12.150	13.250	11.600	11.850	71.950
	Franco Guitierrez (ARG)	12.350	11.250	11.250	13.300	13.050	11.300	72.500
	Adrian Prieto (MEX)	10.950	13.000	10.500		12.700	12.550	59.700
	Andres Resendiz (MEX)	13.150	12.650	11.200	13.350	13.050	9.700	73.100
	Francisco Fragoso (POR)		9.550	12.050			11.750	33.350
	Gustavo Simoes (POR)	13.500	14.300	14.350	14.300	13.700	12.950	83.100
	Chong Leng Will Tan (SIN)	11.100			12.750			23.850
	Timothy Kai Chen Tay (SIN)	13.300	12.150	10.950	13.650	11.600	9.850	71.500
	Andraz Lamut (SLO)	12.700	11.750	11.550	13.300	12.800	10.900	73.000
	Jure Pavlica (SLO)		13.850					13.850
	Ryan Sheppard (HUN)	13.700	11.250	13.700	14.550	14.250	12.250	79.700
	Hadi Khanarinejad (IRI)	12.700		14.350				27.050
	Iman Khamooshi (IRI)	13.200		11.950	14.400			39.550
	Vasili Mikhalitsyn (BLR)		13.900	13.375		14.575	12.350	54.200
	Hamzarudin Bin Nordin (MAS)	11.575		11.950	11.400			34.925
	Artur Tovmasyan (ARM)			15.750				15.750
