= Badminton at the 2015 Summer Universiade =

Badminton at the XXVIII Summer Universiade
- Venue: Hwasun Hanium Culture Sports Center
- Dates: July 6, 2015 – July 12, 2015

Badminton was contested at the 2015 Summer Universiade from July 6 to 12 at the Hwasun Hanium Culture Sports Center in Hwasun, South Korea. Men's and women's singles, men's, women's, and mixed doubles, and mixed team events will be contested.

== Medal summary ==
=== Medal table ===
South Korea became the overall champion after winning all the events competed, with 6 gold, 2 silver and 1 bronze medals.

* Host nation (South Korea)

Rank	Nation	Gold	Silver	Bronze	Total
1	South Korea (KOR)*	6	2	1	9
2	China (CHN)	0	2	0	2
3	Chinese Taipei (TPE)	0	1	5	6
4	Thailand (THA)	0	1	2	3
5	Japan (JPN)	0	0	2	2
5	Malaysia (MAS)	0	0	2	2
Totals (6 entries)		6	6	12	24

=== Medal events ===
South Korea clinched the individual and the team event. In the mixed team event, they won the title with a comprehensive 3–0 beating China. After the Chinese player, Yu Xiaohan was tested positive for doping violation, her women's doubles silver medal was reallocated, and China was disqualified and the team placings were also reallocated. The table below gives an overview of the individual and team event medal winners at the 2015 Summer Universiade.

Event	Gold	Silver	Bronze
Men's singles	Jeon Hyeok-jin; South Korea	Son Wan-ho; South Korea	Chou Tien-chen; Chinese Taipei
Men's singles	Jeon Hyeok-jin; South Korea	Son Wan-ho; South Korea	Hsu Jen-hao; Chinese Taipei
Women's singles	Sung Ji-hyun; South Korea	Porntip Buranaprasertsuk; Thailand	Shiho Tanaka; Japan
Women's singles	Sung Ji-hyun; South Korea	Porntip Buranaprasertsuk; Thailand	Tai Tzu-ying; Chinese Taipei
Men's doubles	South Korea (KOR); Kim Ki-jung; Kim Sa-rang	China (CHN); Wang Yilu; Zhang Wen	Malaysia (MAS); Low Juan Shen; Mohamad Arif Abdul Latif
Men's doubles	South Korea (KOR); Kim Ki-jung; Kim Sa-rang	China (CHN); Wang Yilu; Zhang Wen	Thailand (THA); Bodin Isara; Nipitphon Puangpuapech
Women's doubles	South Korea (KOR); Lee So-hee; Shin Seung-chan	South Korea (KOR); Go Ah-ra; Yoo Hae-won	Japan (JPN); Miki Kashihara; Miyuki Kato
Women's doubles	South Korea (KOR); Lee So-hee; Shin Seung-chan	South Korea (KOR); Go Ah-ra; Yoo Hae-won	Chinese Taipei (TPE); Hsu Ya-ching; Pai Yu-po
Mixed doubles	South Korea (KOR); Kim Ki-jung; Shin Seung-chan	Chinese Taipei (TPE); Chiang Kai-hsin; Lu Ching-yao	South Korea (KOR); Go Ah-ra; Kim Sa-rang
Mixed doubles	South Korea (KOR); Kim Ki-jung; Shin Seung-chan	Chinese Taipei (TPE); Chiang Kai-hsin; Lu Ching-yao	Chinese Taipei (TPE); Tseng Min-hao; Hsieh Pei-chen
Mixed team	South Korea (KOR); Go Ah-ra; Jeon Hyeok-jin; Kim Ki-jung; Kim Hyo-min; Kim Sa-rang; Ko Sung-hyun; Lee So-hee; Lee Yong-dae; Shin Seung-chan; Son Wan-ho; Sung Ji-hyun; Yoo Hae-won	China (CHN); Fan Mengyan; Gao Huan; Hui Xirui; Ou Dongni; Qiao Bin; Wang Yilu; Xu Zuopeng; ~~Yu Xiaohan~~ (disqualified); Zhang Wen; Zhang Zhijun	Thailand (THA); Bodin Isara; Busanan Ongbamrungphan; Chayanit Chaladchalam; Jakkit Tuntirasin; Jongkolphan Kititharakul; Nipitphon Puangpuapech; Phataimas Muenwong; Porntip Buranaprasertsuk; Rawinda Prajongjai; Sermsin Wongyaprom; Suppanyu Avihingsanon; Tanongsak Saensomboonsuk
Mixed team	South Korea (KOR); Go Ah-ra; Jeon Hyeok-jin; Kim Ki-jung; Kim Hyo-min; Kim Sa-rang; Ko Sung-hyun; Lee So-hee; Lee Yong-dae; Shin Seung-chan; Son Wan-ho; Sung Ji-hyun; Yoo Hae-won	China (CHN); Fan Mengyan; Gao Huan; Hui Xirui; Ou Dongni; Qiao Bin; Wang Yilu; Xu Zuopeng; ~~Yu Xiaohan~~ (disqualified); Zhang Wen; Zhang Zhijun	Malaysia (MAS); Mohamad Arif Abdul Latif; Erica Khoo Pei Shan; Ti Wei Chyi; Sannatasah Saniru; Low Juan Shen; Lyddia Cheah Yi Yu; Zulfadli Zulkiffli; Vountus Indra Mawan; Muhammad Syawal Mohd Ismail; Daphne Ng Chiew Yen; Jagdish Singh; Sylvia Kavita Kumares

== Match result ==
=== Mixed Team ===
Quarter-Finals		Semi-Finals		Gold Medal Match
China	3
Japan	0	China	3
Chinese Taipei	2	Thailand	1
Thailand	3			China	0
Indonesia	2			South Korea	3
Malaysia	3	Malaysia	0
Germany	0	South Korea	3
South Korea	3

== Participating nations ==
- Argentina
- Australia
- Botswana
- Brazil
- Canada
- China
- Estonia
- Finland
- France
- Great Britain
- Germany
- Ghana
- Hong Kong
- Indonesia
- India
- Japan
- South Korea
- Lebanon
- Malaysia
- Mauritius
- Nepal
- Nigeria
- Philippines
- Poland
- Russia
- Slovenia
- Serbia
- Sri Lanka
- Switzerland
- Sweden
- Thailand
- Chinese Taipei
- Uganda
- United States
- Zambia
