= Archery at the 2015 Summer Universiade – Women's individual recurve =

Women's individual recurve at the 2015 Summer Universiade
- Venue: International Archery Centre
- Location: Gwangju
- Dates: 4 – 8 July 2015
- Competitors: 58 from 29 nations

Medalists
gold medal	Ki Bo-bae	South Korea
silver medal	Choi Mi-sun	South Korea
bronze medal	Maja Jager	Denmark

The women's individual recurve archery event at the 2015 Summer Universiade was held at the International Archery Center in Gwangju, South Korea from 4 July to 8 July 2015. It was the fifth time the event had been contested at the Summer Universiade and was its first appearance since the 2011 Summer Universiade, archery having not been selected as part of the sporting programme for the 2013 edition. Open to athletes aged between 17 and 28 enrolled in an undergraduate or postgraduate university programme, a total of fifty-eight archers from twenty-nine countries entered the competition.

Ki Bo-bae of South Korea entered as the defending champion. Ki also entered as the reigning Olympic champion, with Mariana Avitia of Mexico, who won the bronze medal at the London 2012 Olympics, also competing.

In the ranking round Ki broke the world record score for a 72-arrow round which had been held by former Olympic champion Park Sung-hyun, also of South Korea, for more than ten years. Ki went on to successfully defend her Universiade title, defeating teammate Choi Mi-sun in a one-arrow shoot-off in the final to win the gold medal. Maja Jager of Denmark won the bronze medal after beating Hsiung Mei-chien of Chinese Taipei, also in a one-arrow shoot-off.

== Format ==
An official World Archery target consists of ten evenly-spaced concentric rings. Shooting an arrow into the outermost ring scores one point; landing in the centre yellow circle earns the maximum ten points.

The women's individual was an outdoor recurve target archery event held to the World Archery-approved rules. Archers shot at a 122 cm-wide target from a distance of 70 metres, with each arrow awarded between one and ten points depending on how close it landed to the centre of the target. The competition was spread over five days and consisted of an initial ranking round, six elimination rounds, and two finals matches, which decided the winners of the gold, silver, and bronze medals. In the ranking round, each of the 58 archers entering the competition shot a total of 72 arrows. The total score of each archer was used to seed the archers into the following single-elimination tournament, the number one seed going to the highest-scoring archer.

The elimination rounds used the Archery Olympic Round set system introduced in international competitions in 2010. Each match consisted of a maximum of five sets, with archers each shooting three arrows per set. The archer with the highest score from their three arrows, for a maximum of 30, won the set, earning two set points. The archer with the lowest score in each set received zero points. If the score was tied, each archer received one point. The first archer to reach six set points was declared the winner. If the match was tied at five set points each after the maximum five sets were played, a single tie-breaker arrow was used with the archer shooting closest to centre of the target winning.

=== Schedule ===
Day	Date	Time	Round
1	Saturday, 4 July 2015	09:15-12:30	Ranking round
3	Monday, 6 July 2015	09:00-09:35	1/48 elimination round
3	Monday, 6 July 2015	09:35-10:10	1/24 elimination round
3	Monday, 6 July 2015	10:20-10:55	1/16 elimination round
3	Monday, 6 July 2015	10:55-11:30	1/8 elimination round
3	Monday, 6 July 2015	11:30-12:05	Quarter-finals
3	Monday, 6 July 2015	12:05-12:40	Semifinals
5	Wednesday, 8 July 2015	16:24	Bronze medal match
5	Wednesday, 8 July 2015	16:41	Gold medal match
All times are Korea Standard Time (UTC+09:00); Source:

== Report ==
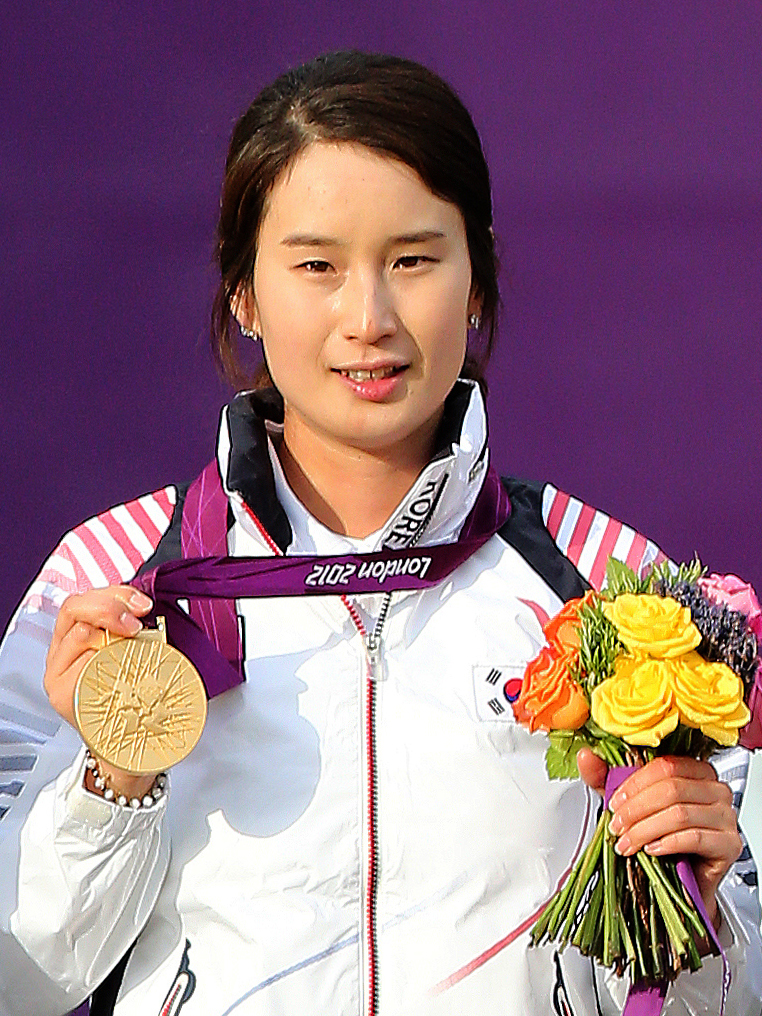
Ki Bo-bae (pictured at the 2012 Summer Olympics) successfully defending her individual Summer Universiade title.

The ranking round held on the morning of Saturday, 4 July was dominated by the three South Korean entries of Ki, Choi, and Kang Chae-young. Ki topped the standings with a new world record total for a 72-arrow round, scoring 686 to beat the existing record of Park Sung-hyun, set in 2004, by four points. It was not initially clear whether Ki's score would be officially recognised due to conflicting information about whether the Summer Universiade competition met World Archery standards for a new record to be set. The Gwangju Universiade Organising Committee later confirmed on the following Wednesday that Ki would indeed stand as the new world record holder.

The final between Ki and Choi was characterised by Chungnam Ilbo as a battle between the present and future stars of Korean archery. It was the second time the two had faced off against one another in an international final in 2015, having previously contested the gold medal at the second stage of the Archery World Cup in Antalya, Turkey, in which Choi emerged victorious. In an even contest, neither Ki nor Choi shot lower than 28 in any of the five sets, Ki holding the advantage until Choi won the third and fourth sets to take a 5–3 lead in set points. A perfect score of 30 in the fifth set by Ki however tied the match, necessitating the day's second medal-deciding one-arrow shoot-off.

The victory marked Ki's first individual title for almost three years.

== Results ==
=== Ranking round ===
Key

Advanced to 1/16 elimination round
Advanced to 1/24 elimination round
Advanced to 1/48 elimination round

Rank	Archer	Half		Score	10s	Xs
Rank	Archer	1st	2nd	Score	10s	Xs
1	Ki Bo-bae (KOR)	344	342	686 WR	42	14
2	Kang Chae-young (KOR)	336	343	679	39	16
3	Choi Mi-sun (KOR)	334	339	673	39	17
4	Tan Ya-ting (TPE)	334	332	666	28	6
5	Maja Jager (DEN)	334	321	655	24	9
6	Inna Stepanova (RUS)	328	327	655	23	6
7	Hsiung Mei-chien (TPE)	328	321	649	24	4
8	Miriam Alarcón (ESP)	320	327	647	18	4
9	Tomomi Sugimoto (JPN)	319	326	645	18	7
10	Mariana Avitia (MEX)	315	329	644	18	9
11	Mariana Garcia (MEX)	326	316	642	21	6
12	Tuiana Dashidorzhieva (RUS)	317	325	642	15	5
13	Lin Shih-chia (TPE)	314	325	639	20	5
14	Ayano Kato (JPN)	324	314	638	16	2
15	Audrey Adiceom (FRA)	322	314	636	20	7
16	Ana Umer (SLO)	319	317	636	15	2
17	Anna Balsukova (RUS)	306	325	631	19	5
18	Marine Maire (FRA)	306	325	631	14	5
19	Mirene Exteberria (ESP)	317	311	628	20	5
20	Madhu Vedwan (IND)	316	311	627	19	4
21	Wu Sze Yan (HKG)	317	305	622	15	4
22	Branduin Stroud (USA)	307	313	620	29	6
23	Erika Jangnas (SWE)	309	310	619	13	4
24	Laurie Lecointre (FRA)	306	312	618	16	5
25	Haruka Furuta (JPN)	307	311	618	13	3
26	Alexandra Mirca (MDA)	307	309	616	14	7
27	Reena Parnet (EST)	309	305	614	17	5
28	Celine Schobinger (SUI)	299	315	614	16	3
29	Julia Chavez (MEX)	305	308	613	15	5
30	Najka Tomat (SLO)	313	299	612	15	6
31	Laura Nurmsalu (EST)	308	304	612	14	5
32	Brina Bozic (SLO)	304	307	611	18	4
33	Iliana Deineko (SUI)	308	303	611	17	4
34	Ariunbileg Nyamjargal (MGL)	294	313	607	17	5
35	Zuzanna Cwiklinska (POL)	311	296	607	12	3
36	Claudia Mandia (ITA)	304	303	607	9	3
37	Claire van Dijck (NED)	292	314	606	15	3
38	Anete Kreicberga (LAT)	300	303	603	12	3
39	Joanna Rzasa (POL)	300	303	603	9	3
40	Sabrina Leong (USA)	309	291	600	14	4
41	Dagiijanchiv Jargalsaikhan (MGL)	293	302	595	13	1
42	Adriana Rachwal (POL)	295	297	592	12	3
43	Tze Rong Vanessa Loh (SIN)	291	300	591	12	3
44	Sally Gilder (GBR)	302	289	591	11	5
45	Giada Doretto (ITA)	299	279	578	13	4
46	Azuanis Abdullah (MAS)	299	279	578	8	0
47	Preeti (IND)	299	276	575	11	0
48	Aileen Yu (USA)	281	293	574	7	3
49	Nur Atiqah Azizi (MAS)	282	289	571	9	0
50	Simona Alberti (ITA)	294	276	570	7	1
51	Nikita Kanwar (IND)	277	287	564	5	1
52	Tang Pui Yiu (HKG)	292	270	562	9	2
53	Nurul Asiah Mahmod Siti (MAS)	270	285	555	11	3
54	Budaltai Batkhuyag (MGL)	272	277	549	6	1
55	Zuzana Lucanicova (SVK)	252	280	532	5	1
56	Miranda Bergantin de Araujo (BRA)	272	252	524	3	1
57	Dalylla Machado do Nascimento (BRA)	265	252	517	5	2
58	Krishna Maya Syangtan (NEP)	236	248	484	4	2

=== Finals ===
Quarter finals
1	Ki Bo-bae (KOR)	6	28	29	30	27
9	Tomomi Sugimoto (JPN)	2	26	29	28	27
5	Maja Jager (DEN)	7	29	29	28	30
4	Tan Ya-ting (TPE)	1	29	28	26	29
3	Choi Mi-sun (KOR)	6	30	30	29
27	Reena Parnet (EST)	0	28	27	21
7	Hsiung Mei-chien (TPE)	6	26	28	26	28
18	Marine Maire (FRA)	2	29	26	25	27

Semi finals
1	Ki Bo-bae (KOR)	6*	28	28	28	29	30
5	Maja Jager (DEN)	5	28	29	28	29	26
3	Choi Mi-sun (KOR)	6	29	30	28	30
7	Hsiung Mei-chien (TPE)	2	26	28	28	30

Finals
1	Ki Bo-bae (KOR) (gold)	6*	29	29	28	28	30
3	Choi Mi-sun (KOR) (silver)	5	28	29	30	29	28
Third place
5	Maja Jager (DEN) (bronze)	6*	28	24	27	26	29
7	Hsiung Mei-chien (TPE)	5	25	29	26	27	29

Note: An asterisk (*) denotes a win from a one-arrow shoot-off
