= Athletics at the 2015 Summer Universiade =

- Dates: July 8, 2015 – July 12, 2015
- Host city: Gwangju, South Korea
- Venue: Gwangju Universiade Main Stadium
- Level: Senior
- Events: 46
- Participation: 1073 athletes from 107 nations
- Records set: 3 URs

Athletics was contested at the 2015 Summer Universiade from July 8 to 12 at the Gwangju Universiade Main Stadium in Gwangju, South Korea.

== Medal summary ==
=== Men's events ===
Event	Gold		Silver		Bronze	
100 metres	Akani Simbine; South Africa	9.97 UR	Kemarley Brown; Jamaica	10.12	Ramil Guliyev; Turkey	10.16
200 metres	Hua Wilfried Koffi; Ivory Coast	20.41 SB	Bryce Robinson; United States	20.51	Ramil Guliyev; Turkey	20.59 SB
400 metres	Luguelín Santos; Dominican Republic	44.91 SB	Leaname Maotoanong; Botswana	45.63 PB	Jan Tesař; Czech Republic	45.73 PB
800 metres	Shaquille Walker; United States	1:49.05	Abdelati El Guesse; Morocco	1:49.29	Rynardt van Rensburg; South Africa	1:49.30
1500 metres	Aleksey Kharitonov; Russia	3:39.13 PB	Abdelali Razyn; Morocco	3:39.20 PB	Staffan Ek; Sweden	3:39.68 PB
5000 metres	Hayle Ibrahimov; Azerbaijan	13:44.28	Zouhair Talbi; Morocco	14:02.26	Rinas Akhmadeev; Russia	14:05:88
10,000 metres	Igor Maksimov; Russia	29:15.30	Nicolae Soare; Romania	29:18.71 PB	Keisuke Nakatani; Japan	29:19.30
110 metres hurdles	Greggmar Swift; Barbados	13.43	Konstantin Shabanov; Russia	13.57 SB	Genta Masuno; Japan	13.69
400 metres hurdles	Thomas Barr; Ireland	48.78	Abdelmalik Lahoulou; Algeria	48.99 PB	Ivan Shablyuev; Russia	49.04 PB
3000 metres steeplechase	Martin Christian Grau; Germany	8:31.55 SB	Kaur Kivistik; Estonia	8:32.23 PB	Yuriy Kloptsov; Russia	8:33.09
4 × 100 metres relay	Japan (JPN); Kazuma Oseto; Kotaro Taniguchi; Takuya Nagata; Tatsuro Suwa; Yuki Koike*	39.08	Poland (POL); Adam Pawłowski; Grzegorz Zimniewicz; Artur Zaczek; Kamil Kryński; Jakub Adamski*	39.50	South Africa (RSA); Akani Simbine; Gideon Trotter; Eckhardt Roussouw; Ncincilili Titi	39.68
4 × 400 metres relay	Dominican Republic (DOM); Luguelín Santos; Gustavo Cuesta; Juander Santos; Máximo Mercedes; Leonel Bonon*	3:05.05	Japan (JPN); Julian Jrummi Walsh; Kentaro Sato; Kazuma Oseto; Takamasa Kitagawa; Nobuya Kato	3:07.75	Poland (POL); Mateusz Zagórski; Michał Pietrzak; Kamil Gurdak; Rafał Omelko; Robert Bryliński*	3:07.77
Half marathon	Yusuke Ogura; Japan	1:04:41	Tadashi Isshiki; Japan	1:04:52	Yuta Takahashi; Japan	1:05:29
Half marathon team	Japan (JPN); Yusuke Ogura; Tadashi Isshiki; Yuta Takahashi; Naoki Kudo	3:15:03	Turkey (TUR); Vedat Günen; Şeref Dirli; Aykut Taşdemir; Mehmet Akkoyun	3:26:17	South Africa (RSA); Thabang Masihleho; Sibabalwe Mzazi; Marianio Eesou; Zolani Ngqaqa; Goitsemodimo Bothobutle	3:26:29
20 kilometres walk	Dane Bird-Smith; Australia	1:21:30	Benjamin Thorne; Canada	1:21:33 SB	Daisuke Matsunaga; Japan	1:22:06
20 km walk team	Ukraine (UKR); Ihor Hlavan; Nazar Kovalenko; Ivan Banzeruk	4:17:44	China (CHN); Sun Chenggang; Yin Jiaxing; Zhang Zhi; Xie Sichao	4:26:10	Russia (RUS); Sergey Sharypov; Aleksandr Nazarov; Vladislav Maksimov	4:27:17
High jump	Daniil Tsyplakov; Russia	2.31 m	Matúš Bubeník; Slovakia	2.28 m PB	Hsiang Chun-Hsien; Chinese Taipei	2.28 m PB
Pole vault	Nikita Filippov; Kazakhstan	5.50 m	Ilya Mudrov; Russia	5.50 m	Robert Sobera; Poland	5.50 m
Long jump	Pavel Shalin; Russia	8.29 m	Vasiliy Kopeykin; Russia	8.13 m	Rudolph Johannes Pienaard; South Africa	7.98 m
Triple jump	Dmitriy Sorokin; Russia	17.29 m PB	Hugues Fabrice Zango; Burkina Faso	16.76 m PB	Xu Xiaolong; China	16.76 m
Shot put	Inderjeet Singh; India	20.27 m	Andrei Marius Gag; Romania	19.92 m	Aleksandr Bulanov; Russia	19.84 m
Discus throw	Philip Milanov; Belgium	64.15 m	Matthew Denny; Australia	62.58 m PB	Andrius Gudžius; Lithuania	62.54 m
Hammer throw	Paweł Fajdek; Poland	80.05 m	Pavel Bareisha; Belarus	75.75 m	Siarhei Kalamoyets; Belarus	74.68 m
Javelin throw	Tanel Laanmäe; Estonia	81.71 m	Huang Shih-Feng; Chinese Taipei	81.27 m	Zigismunds Sirmais; Latvia	79.37 m SB
Decathlon	Thomas Van Der Plaetsen; Belgium	7952 pts	Bastien Auzeil; France	7913 pts	Rene Strauss; Germany	7791 pts

=== Women's events ===
Event	Gold		Silver		Bronze	
100 metres	Viktoriya Zyabkina; Kazakhstan	11.23	Shimayra Williams; Jamaica	11.46	Yelena Kozlova; Russia	11.47
200 metres	Viktoriya Zyabkina; Kazakhstan	22.77 NR	Akeyla Mitchell; United States	22.95 PB	Kedisha Dallas; Jamaica	23.24 PB
400 metres	Justine Palframan; South Africa	51.27 PB	Małgorzata Hołub; Poland	51.93 SB	Yang Huizhen; China	51.98 PB
800 metres	Angie Petty; New Zealand	1:59.06 PB	Simoya Campbell; Jamaica	1:59.26 PB	Fabienne Kohlmann; Germany	1:59.54 PB
1500 metres	Docus Ajok; Uganda	4:18.53 SB	Gabriela Stafford; Canada	4:19.27	Kristina Ugarova; Russia	4:19.78
5000 metres	Kristiina Mäki; Czech Republic	16:03.29	Camille Buscomb; New Zealand	16:03.72	Daria Maslova; Kyrgyzstan	16:04.09
10,000 metres	Alla Kuliatina; Russia	32:52.27 PB	Gulshat Fazlitdinova; Russia	32:55.35	Zhang Yingying; China	32:56.60 SB
100 metres hurdles	Danielle Williams; Jamaica	12.78	Nina Morozova; Russia	12.83	Michelle Jenneke; Australia	12.94
400 metres hurdles	Joanna Linkiewicz; Poland	55.62	Emilia Ankiewicz; Poland	56.55 SB	Irina Takuncheva; Russia	56.57 PB
3000 metres steeplechase	Yekaterina Sokolenko; Russia	9:25.77 UR	Natalya Vlasova; Russia	9:35.99 SB	Özlem Kaya; Turkey	9:37.79
4 × 100 metres relay	Kazakhstan (KAZ); Anastassiya Tulapina; Svetlana Ivanchukova; Yuliya Rakhmanova; Viktoriya Zyabkina	44.28	United States (USA); Ana Holland; Kylie Price; Jade Barber; Nataliyah Friar	44.95	Thailand (THA); Supawan Thaipat; Phensri Chairoek; Tassaporn Wannakit; Khanrutai Pakdee	45.03
4 × 400 metres relay	Poland (POL); Małgorzata Hołub; Monika Szczęsna; Joanna Linkiewicz; Justyna Święty	3:31.98	Russia (RUS); Liliya Gafiyatullina; Kristina Malvinova; Irina Takuncheva; Yelena Zuykevich	3:32.46	United States (USA); Akeyla Mitchell; Madeline Kopp; Kimberly Mackay; Alissa Martinez	3:37.20
Half marathon	Zhang Yingying; China	1:15:06	Nanako Kanno; Japan	1:15:24	Ayumi Uehara; Japan	1:15:35
Half marathon team	Japan (JPN); Nanako Kanno; Ayumi Uehara; Maki Izumida; Sakurako Fukuuchi	3:47:08	China (CHN); Zhang Yingying; Zhang Meixia; Xiao Huinin	3:55:15	Turkey (TUR); Nilay Ersun; Şeyma Yıldız; Yasemin Can; Elif Tozlu; Burcu Büyükbezgin	3:55:36
20 kilometres walk	Anisya Kirdyapkina; Russia	1:28:18 UR	Marina Pandakova; Russia	1:29:52	Hou Yongbo; China	1:32:42
20 km walk team	Russia (RUS); Anisya Kirdyapkina; Marina Pandakova; Sofiya Brodatskaya; Lina Kalutskaya	4:33:11	China (CHN); Hou Yongbo; Yang Jiayu; Yang Mingxia; Liu Huan	4:47:58	Australia (AUS); Rachel Tallent; Stephanie Stigwood; Nicole Fagan	5:06:28
High jump	Airinė Palšytė; Lithuania	1.84 m	Elisabeth Boyer; United States; Madara Onužāne; Latvia	1.80 m		
Pole vault	Li Ling; China	4.45 m	Eliza McCartney; New Zealand	4.40 m SB	Chloé Henry; Belgium	4.40 m SB
Long jump	Yuliya Pidluzhnaya; Russia	6.79 m SB	Anna Jagaciak; Poland	6.57 m SB	Naa Adjeley Anang; Australia	6.55 m PB
Triple jump	Yekaterina Koneva; Russia	14.60 m	Jenny Elbe; Germany	13.86 m	Anna Jagaciak; Poland	13.81 m
Shot put	Lena Urbaniak; Germany	18.00 m PB	Paulina Guba; Poland	17.94 m PB	Brittany Crew; Canada	17.27 m PB
Discus throw	Yuliya Maltseva; Russia	59.37 m	Marike Steinacker; Germany	58.83 m	Stefania Strumillo; Italy	58.22 m PB
Hammer throw	Hanna Skydan; Azerbaijan	70.67 m	Joanna Fiodorow; Poland	69.69 m	Julia Ratcliffe; New Zealand	67.54 m
Javelin throw	Tatsiana Khaladovich; Belarus	60.45 m	Līna Mūze; Latvia	60.26 m	Irena Šedivá; Czech Republic	59.89 m PB
Heptathlon	Anna Stephanie Maiwald; Germany	5965 pts	Ida Marcussen; Norway	5865 pts	Anna Petrich; Russia	5795 pts

== Medal table ==
Rank	Nation	Gold	Silver	Bronze	Total
1	Russia (RUS)	12	8	9	29
2	Japan (JPN)	4	3	5	12
3	Kazakhstan (KAZ)	4	0	0	4
4	Poland (POL)	3	6	3	12
5	Germany (GER)	3	2	2	7
6	China (CHN)	2	3	4	9
7	South Africa (RSA)	2	0	4	6
8	Belgium (BEL)	2	0	1	3
9	Azerbaijan (AZE)	2	0	0	2
9	Dominican Republic (DOM)	2	0	0	2
11	United States (USA)	1	4	1	6
12	Jamaica (JAM)	1	3	1	5
13	New Zealand (NZL)	1	2	1	4
14	Australia (AUS)	1	1	3	5
15	Belarus (BLR)	1	1	1	3
16	Estonia (EST)	1	1	0	2
17	Czech Republic (CZE)	1	0	2	3
18	Lithuania (LTU)	1	0	1	2
19	Barbados (BAR)	1	0	0	1
19	India (IND)	1	0	0	1
19	Ireland (IRL)	1	0	0	1
19	Ivory Coast (CIV)	1	0	0	1
19	Uganda (UGA)	1	0	0	1
19	Ukraine (UKR)	1	0	0	1
25	Morocco (MAR)	0	3	0	3
26	Canada (CAN)	0	2	1	3
26	Latvia (LAT)	0	2	1	3
28	Romania (ROU)	0	2	0	2
29	Turkey (TUR)	0	1	4	5
30	Chinese Taipei (TPE)	0	1	1	2
31	Algeria (ALG)	0	1	0	1
31	Botswana (BOT)	0	1	0	1
31	Burkina Faso (BUR)	0	1	0	1
31	France (FRA)	0	1	0	1
31	Norway (NOR)	0	1	0	1
31	Slovakia (SVK)	0	1	0	1
37	Italy (ITA)	0	0	1	1
37	Kyrgyzstan (KGZ)	0	0	1	1
37	Sweden (SWE)	0	0	1	1
37	Thailand (THA)	0	0	1	1
Totals (40 entries)		50	51	49	150

== Participating nations ==
- Afghanistan (3)
- Algeria (12)
- Anguilla (1)
- Argentina (11)
- Australia (34)
- Austria (6)
- Azerbaijan (2)
- Bangladesh (2)
- Barbados (2)
- Belarus (4)
- Belgium (10)
- Bosnia and Herzegovina (1)
- Botswana (10)
- Brazil (4)
- Bulgaria (2)
- Burkina Faso (2)
- Cambodia (2)
- Cameroon (2)
- Canada (40)
- Chile (18)
- China (41)
- Chinese Taipei (13)
- Colombia (4)
- Costa Rica (5)
- Croatia (3)
- Cyprus (5)
- Czech Republic (13)
- Democratic Republic of the Congo (2)
- Denmark (15)
- Dominican Republic (5)
- Equatorial Guinea (2)
- Estonia (28)
- Ethiopia (2)
- Federated States of Micronesia (1)
- Finland (11)
- France (6)
- Gabon (2)
- Germany (15)
- Ghana (13)
- Hong Kong (10)
- Hungary (11)
- India (10)
- Iran (2)
- Ireland (5)
- Italy (18)
- Ivory Coast (1)
- Jamaica (10)
- Japan (32)
- Jordan (7)
- Kazakhstan (15)
- Kenya (7)
- Kyrgyzstan (4)
- Latvia (13)
- Lebanon (10)
- Liberia (1)
- Lithuania (17)
- Luxembourg (3)
- Malaysia (9)
- Mali (2)
- Malta (3)
- Mexico (13)
- Moldova (3)
- Mongolia (6)
- Montenegro (1)
- Morocco (10)
- Netherlands (7)
- New Zealand (30)
- Niger (1)
- Nigeria (9)
- Northern Mariana Islands (1)
- Norway (26)
- Oman (11)
- Pakistan (2)
- Panama (3)
- Philippines (4)
- Poland (25)
- Portugal (9)
- Qatar (2)
- Romania (15)
- Russia (80)
- Rwanda (2)
- El Salvador (1)
- Senegal (5)
- Serbia (3)
- Singapore (1)
- Slovakia (8)
- Slovenia (16)
- Solomon Islands (1)
- South Africa (39)
- South Korea (31)
- Sri Lanka (15)
- Suriname (2)
- Swaziland (2)
- Sweden (16)
- Switzerland (5)
- Tanzania (1)
- Thailand (19)
- Trinidad and Tobago (2)
- Turkey (14)
- Uganda (11)
- Ukraine (8)
- United States (44)
- United States Virgin Islands (2)
- Uzbekistan (3)
- Venezuela (12)
- Zambia (3)
- Zimbabwe (5)

== See also ==
- 2015 in the sport of athletics
- FISU World University Games
- University and college sport
