= Vietnam at the 2015 Summer Universiade =

- IOC code: VIE
- NOC: Vietnam University Sports Association

in Gwangju, South Korea 3 – 14 July 2015
- Competitors: 6 (3 men and 3 women) in 1 sport and 5 events
- Medals Ranked 58th: Gold 0 Silver 0 Bronze 2 Total 2

Summer Universiade appearances
- 1959; 1961; 1963; 1965; 1967; 1970; 1973; 1975; 1977; 1979; 1981; 1983; 1985; 1987; 1989; 1991; 1993; 1995; 1997; 1999; 2001; 2003; 2005; 2007; 2009; 2011; 2013; 2015; 2017; 2019; 2021; 2025; 2027

Vietnam participated at the 2015 Summer Universiade, in Gwangju, South Korea.

== Medals by sport ==
Sport
Taekwondo	0	0	2	2
Total	0	0	2	2

== Medalists ==
Medals	Athletes	Sports	Events	Dates
Bronze	Lê Hiếu Nghĩa; Lê Thanh Trung; Nguyễn Thiên Phụng	Taekwondo	Men's Team Poomsae	8 July
Bronze	Nguyễn Thiên Phụng; Châu Tuyết Vân	Taekwondo	Mixed Pair Poomsae	8 July
