= Kyrgyzstan at the 2015 Summer Universiade =

- IOC code: KGZ
- NOC: National Olympic Committee of the Republic of Kyrgyzstan
- Website: http://www.olympic.kg/

in Gwangju, South Korea 3 – 14 July 2015
- Competitors: 21 in 4 sports
- Medals Ranked 62nd: Gold 0 Silver 0 Bronze 1 Total 1

Summer Universiade appearances
- 1959; 1961; 1963; 1965; 1967; 1970; 1973; 1975; 1977; 1979; 1981; 1983; 1985; 1987; 1989; 1991; 1993; 1995; 1997; 1999; 2001; 2003; 2005; 2007; 2009; 2011; 2013; 2015; 2017; 2019; 2021

Kyrgyzstan participated at the 2015 Summer Universiade in Gwangju, South Korea.

== Competitors ==
Sport	Men	Women	Total
Athletics	1	3	4
Judo	7	4	11
Table tennis	2	0	2
Taekwondo	4	0	4
Total	14	7	21

== Medal summary ==
=== Medal by sports ===
Sport	1st place, gold medalist(s)	2nd place, silver medalist(s)	3rd place, bronze medalist(s)	Total
Athletics	0	0	1	1
Total	0	0	1	1

=== Medalists ===
Medal	Name	Sport	Event	Date
Bronze	Darya Maslova	Athletics	Women's 5000m	11 July
