= Pedro Seabra =

Portuguese footballer

Personal information
- Full name: Pedro Miguel Costa Seabra
- Date of birth: 11 November 1987 (age 38)
- Place of birth: Lavra, Portugal
- Height: 1.84 m (6 ft 0 in)
- Position: Centre-back

Senior career*
Years	Team	Apps	(Gls)
–2009	Padroense		
2009–2011	Leixões	22+	(0+)
2011–2015	Padroense		
- * Club domestic league appearances and goals

Pedro Miguel Costa Seabra (born 11 November 1987) is a Portuguese former professional footballer who played as a centre-back.

== Career ==
Seabra started his career with Portuguese third tier side Padroense. In 2009, he signed for Leixões in the Portuguese top flight, where he made over 22 league appearances and suffered relegation to the Portuguese second tier. In 2011, Seabra returned to Portuguese third tier club Padroense, where he suffered relegation to the Portuguese fourth tier.
