= Algeria at the 2015 Summer Universiade =

- IOC code: ALG
- NOC: Algerian Olympic Committee
- Website: http://www.comiteolympiquealgerien.com/

in Gwangju, South Korea 3 – 14 July 2015
- Competitors: 34 in 3 sports
- Medals Ranked 50th: Gold 0 Silver 1 Bronze 0 Total 1

Summer Universiade appearances
- 1959; 1961; 1963; 1965; 1967; 1970; 1973; 1975; 1977; 1979; 1981; 1983; 1985; 1987; 1989; 1991; 1993; 1995; 1997; 1999; 2001; 2003; 2005; 2007; 2009; 2011; 2013; 2015; 2017; 2019; 2021; 2025; 2027

Algeria participated at the 2015 Summer Universiade in Gwangju, South Korea.

Since 1963, Algeria has taken part at every Summer World University Games with the exception of 1977 Summer Universiade in Sofia and the 1987 Summer Universiade in Zagreb because of the African boycott.

== Medal summary ==
=== Medal by sports ===
Sport	1st place, gold medalist(s)	2nd place, silver medalist(s)	3rd place, bronze medalist(s)	Total
Athletics	0	1	0	1
Total	0	1	0	1

=== Medalists ===
Medal	Name	Sport	Event	Date
Silver	Abdelmalik Lahoulou	Athletics	Men's 400m Hurdles	10 July
