= Norway at the 2015 Summer Universiade =

- IOC code: NOR
- NOC: Norwegian Olympic and Paralympic Committee and Confederation of Sports
- Website: http://www.idrettsforbundet.no/english/

in Gwangju, South Korea 3 – 14 July 2015
- Competitors: 55 in 5 sports
- Medals Ranked 50th: Gold 0 Silver 1 Bronze 0 Total 1

Summer Universiade appearances
- 1959; 1961; 1963; 1965; 1967; 1970; 1973; 1975; 1977; 1979; 1981; 1983; 1985; 1987; 1989; 1991; 1993; 1995; 1997; 1999; 2001; 2003; 2005; 2007; 2009; 2011; 2013; 2015; 2017; 2019; 2021

Norway participated at the 2015 Summer Universiade in Gwangju, South Korea.

== Medal summary ==
=== Medal by sports ===
Sport	1st place, gold medalist(s)	2nd place, silver medalist(s)	3rd place, bronze medalist(s)	Total
Athletics	0	1	0	1
Total	0	1	0	1

=== Medalists ===
Medal	Name	Sport	Event	Date
Silver	Ida Marcussen	Athletics	Women's Heptathlon	11 July
