= Handball at the 2015 Summer Universiade =

Handball at the XXVIII Summer Universiade
- Venue: various
- Dates: July 6, 2015 – July 13, 2015
- Teams: 13 (men); 12 (women)

Handball was contested at the 2015 Summer Universiade from 6 to 13 July in Gwangju, South Korea.

== Medal summary ==
=== Medal events ===
Event	Gold	Silver	Bronze
Men	Portugal; Manuel Magalhães; Fábio Vidrago; Pedro Correia; Pedro Seabra; Vasco Coimbra; Carlos de Carvalho; Belone Ferreira; Alfredo Quintana; Miguel Pinheiro; Carlos Reis; Nuno de Sousa; David Pombo; Nuno Magalhães; Hugo Delgado; Hugo Lima; Bruno Rodrigues	Serbia; Stefan Čirić; Vladimir Tomić; Igor Milović; Đorđe Spasić; Aleksandar Gugleta; Miloš Topalović; Davor Basarić; Vanja Ilić; Davorin Vujović; Tibor Ivanišević; Savo Mester; Miloš Lojaničić; Nikola Damnjanović; Milan Pavlović; Radule Radulović; Andrija Madar	Switzerland; Flavio Wick; Jost Brücker; Marvin Lier; Nicolas Raemy; Björn Fröhlich; Fabio Baviera; Tobias Wetzel; Dominic Rosenberg; Jonas Dähler; Lukas von Deschwanden; Thomas Hofstetter; Valentin Striffeler; Severin Ramseier; Filip Maros; Kaspar Arn; Tobias Baumgartner
Women	Russia; Natalia Reshetnikova; Polina Gorshkova; Natalia Chigirinova; Valentina Goncharova; Anna Vyakhireva; Veronika Garanina; Ksenia Makeeva; Evgeniya Petrova; Anna Shukalova; Polina Vedekhina; Elena Utkina; Alena Ikhneva; Daria Vakhterova; Ksenia Karpacheva; Anastasia Kudriashova; Evelina Anoshkina	South Korea; Jung Yu-ra; Ryu Eun-hee; Park Sae-young; Kim Jin-yi; Choi Su-min; Ju Hui; Sim Hae-in; Han Mi-seul; Gu Ye-jin; Lee Mi-gyeong; Lee Eun-bi; Kim On-a; Gwon Han-na; Kang Eun-hye; Jo Su-yeon; Yu So-jeong	Serbia; Sanja Radosavljević; Aleksandra Stanisavljević; Sara Garović; Jelena Bursać; Sanja Simić; Hristina Nedeljković; Ivana Prijović; Anđela Janjušević; Jovana Risović; Danka Stefanović; Tamara Georgijev; Dijana Radojević; Nina Kolundžić; Milica Rančić; Jovana Kostić; Marija Petrović

== Men ==
Thirteen teams participated in the men's tournament.

=== Teams ===
Pool A

- South Korea
- Lithuania
- Mexico
- Russia
- Serbia
- United States
- Turkey

Pool B

- Brazil
- Israel
- Hungary
- Japan
- Portugal
- Switzerland

== Women ==
Twelve teams participated in the women's tournament.

=== Teams ===
Pool A

- South Korea
- Ukraine
- Japan
- Montenegro
- Romania
- Serbia

Pool B

- Brazil
- China
- Russia
- Uruguay
- Czech Republic
- Slovakia
