= Volleyball at the 2015 Summer Universiade – Men's tournament =

The 2015 Men's Summer Universiade Volleyball Tournament was the 28th edition of the event, organized by the Summer Universiade. It was held in Gwangju, South Korea from 2–12 July 2015.

== Results ==
All times are Korea Standard Time (UTC+09:00)

== Preliminary round ==
=== Group A ===
Pos	Team	Pld	W	L	Pts	SW	SL	SR	SPW	SPL	SPR	Qualification
1	Chinese Taipei	5	5	0	15	15	2	7.500	427	351	1.217	Quarterfinals
2	Argentina	5	4	1	12	13	5	2.600	433	370	1.170	Quarterfinals
3	South Korea	5	2	3	6	9	11	0.818	437	442	0.989	9th–16th place
4	Czech Republic	5	2	3	6	7	10	0.700	365	375	0.973	9th–16th place
5	United States	5	2	3	4	6	13	0.462	376	442	0.851	17th–20th place
6	Australia	5	0	5	2	6	15	0.400	427	485	0.880	17th–21st place

Date	Time		Score		Set 1	Set 2	Set 3	Set 4	Set 5	Total	Report
2 JUL	13:00	United States	0–3	Czech Republic	22–25	16–25	10–25			48–75	Report
2 JUL	15:00	Chinese Taipei	3–1	Argentina	27–25	23–25	26–24	25–21		101–95	Report
2 JUL	18:00	South Korea	3–2	Australia	20–25	25–20	25–20	23–25	15–9	108–99	Report
3 JUL	11:00	Czech Republic	1–3	Argentina	14–25	14–25	25–15	24–26		77–91	Report
3 JUL	15:00	United States	3–2	Australia	19–25	27–25	23–25	25–22	15–8	109–105	Report
3 JUL	15:00	South Korea	1–3	Chinese Taipei	22–25	16–25	25–23	26–28		89–101	Report
4 JUL	13:00	Australia	1–3	Czech Republic	23–25	20–25	25–21	18–25		86–96	Report
4 JUL	15:00	Argentina	3–0	South Korea	25–19	25–15	25–19			75–53	Report
4 JUL	18:00	Chinese Taipei	3–0	United States	25–18	25–13	25–22			75–53	Report
6 JUL	11:00	United States	0–3	Argentina	22–25	20–25	15–25			57–75	Report
6 JUL	13:00	Australia	0–3	Chinese Taipei	18–25	16–25	21–25			55–75	Report
6 JUL	18:00	Czech Republic	0–3	South Korea	22–25	16–25	20–25			58–75	Report
7 JUL	13:00	Argentina	3–1	Australia	25–22	25–14	22–25	25–21		97–82	Report
7 JUL	15:00	Chinese Taipei	3–0	Czech Republic	25–19	25–17	25–23			75–59	Report
7 JUL	18:00	South Korea	2–3	United States	25–21	33–35	18–25	25–13	11–15	112–109	Report

=== Group B ===
Pos	Team	Pld	W	L	Pts	SW	SL	SR	SPW	SPL	SPR	Qualification
1	Russia	4	4	0	12	12	0	MAX	301	230	1.309	Quarterfinals
2	Iran	4	3	1	8	9	6	1.500	350	298	1.174	Quarterfinals
3	Thailand	4	2	2	7	8	6	1.333	313	304	1.030	9th–16th place
4	Switzerland	4	1	3	3	4	9	0.444	267	311	0.859	9th–16th place
5	Canada	4	0	4	0	0	12	0.000	215	303	0.710	17th–20th place

Date	Time		Score		Set 1	Set 2	Set 3	Set 4	Set 5	Total	Report
2 JUL	13:00	Switzerland	0–3	Thailand	23–25	20–25	21–25			64–75	Report
2 JUL	15:00	Iran	3–0	Canada	25–19	25–10	25–13			75–42	Report
3 JUL	11:00	Canada	0–3	Thailand	21–25	15–25	15–25			51–75	Report
3 JUL	11:00	Russia	3–0	Switzerland	25–14	25–18	25–18			75–50	Report
4 JUL	13:00	Switzerland	1–3	Iran	13–25	25–23	22–25	16–25		76–98	Report
4 JUL	20:00	Thailand	0–3	Russia	22–25	14–25	22–25			58–75	Report
6 JUL	11:00	Iran	3–2	Thailand	23–25	25–22	28–26	25–17	15–13	116–103	Report
6 JUL	13:00	Canada	0–3	Russia	13–25	24–26	22–25			59–76	Report
7 JUL	15:00	Switzerland	3–0	Canada	25–16	27–24	25–22			77–62	Report
7 JUL	20:00	Russia	3–0	Iran	25–22	25–18	25–23			75–63	Report

=== Group C ===
Pos	Team	Pld	W	L	Pts	SW	SL	SR	SPW	SPL	SPR	Qualification
1	Japan	4	4	0	11	12	3	4.000	355	272	1.305	Quarterfinals
2	Chile	4	3	1	8	10	6	1.667	361	330	1.094	Quarterfinals
3	Brazil	4	2	2	7	10	9	1.111	410	408	1.005	9th–16th place
4	Colombia	4	1	3	3	4	10	0.400	270	326	0.828	9th–16th place
5	Hong Kong	4	0	4	1	4	12	0.333	324	384	0.844	17th–21st place

Date	Time		Score		Set 1	Set 2	Set 3	Set 4	Set 5	Total	Report
2 JUL	15:00	Brazil	3–2	Hong Kong	30–28	23–25	24–26	25–13	15–11	117–103	Report
2 JUL	18:00	Colombia	0–3	Chile	22–25	16–25	16–25			54–75	Report
3 JUL	13:25	Colombia	0–3	Japan	13–25	9–25	11–25			33–75	Report
3 JUL	15:00	Chile	3–1	Hong Kong	16–25	25–20	25–20	25–18		91–83	Report
4 JUL	13:00	Brazil	3–1	Colombia	25–21	25–18	18–25	25–18		93–82	Report
4 JUL	18:00	Japan	3–1	Chile	25–14	25–21	22–25	25–20		97–80	Report
6 JUL	15:00	Japan	3–2	Brazil	22–25	25–21	25–20	21–25	15–13	108–104	Report
6 JUL	18:00	Colombia	3–1	Hong Kong	24–26	27–25	25–16	25–16		101–83	Report
7 JUL	15:00	Hong Kong	0–3	Japan	17–25	18–25	20–25			55–75	Report
7 JUL	18:00	Brazil	2–3	Chile	28–26	17–25	15–25	26–24	10–15	96–115	Report

=== Group D ===
Pos	Team	Pld	W	L	Pts	SW	SL	SR	SPW	SPL	SPR	Qualification
1	Ukraine	4	4	0	12	12	2	6.000	347	272	1.276	Quarterfinals
2	Latvia	4	3	1	9	10	3	3.333	310	282	1.099	Quarterfinals
3	Mexico	4	1	3	4	6	9	0.667	328	326	1.006	9th–16th place
4	Venezuela	4	1	3	3	5	11	0.455	321	357	0.899	9th–16th place
5	China	4	1	3	2	3	11	0.273	258	327	0.789	17th–20th place

Date	Time		Score		Set 1	Set 2	Set 3	Set 4	Set 5	Total	Report
2 JUL	13:00	China	0–3	Mexico	17–25	17–25	20–25			54–75	Report
2 JUL	20:45	Ukraine	3–1	Latvia	22–25	25–15	26–24	25–16		98–80	Report
3 JUL	13:00	Ukraine	3–0	Venezuela	25–20	26–24	25–23			76–67	Report
3 JUL	13:00	Latvia	3–0	Mexico	25–22	25–23	25–21			75–66	Report
4 JUL	15:30	China	0–3	Ukraine	17–25	12–25	17–25			46–75	Report
4 JUL	15:30	Venezuela	0–3	Latvia	18–25	25–27	13–25			56–77	Report
6 JUL	11:00	Ukraine	3–1	Mexico	23–25	25–18	25–19	25–17		98–79	Report
6 JUL	15:00	Venezuela	2–3	China	25–17	25–13	24–26	20–25	5–15	99–96	Report
7 JUL	13:00	China	0–3	Latvia	19–25	26–28	17–25			62–78	Report
7 JUL	13:00	Mexico	2–3	Venezuela	26–28	25–15	25–15	24–26	8–15	108–99	Report

== Final round ==
=== 17th–21st Places ===
17th–21st Quarterfinals
9 July –
Bye
United States
9 July –
Bye
China
9 July –
Bye
Canada
9 July
Hong Kong	1
Australia	3

17th–20th Semifinals
10 July
United States	3
China	1
10 July
Canada	1
Australia	3

17th place match
12 July
United States	3
Australia	2
19rd place match
12 July
China	0
Canada	3

=== 17th–21st Quarterfinals ===
Date	Time		Score		Set 1	Set 2	Set 3	Set 4	Set 5	Total	Report
9 JUL	11:00	Hong Kong	1–3	Australia	18–25	25–19	26–28	19–25		88–97	Report

==== 17th–20th semifinals ====
Date	Time		Score		Set 1	Set 2	Set 3	Set 4	Set 5	Total	Report
10 JUL	15:45	United States	3–1	China	23–25	25–15	28–26	26–24		102–90	Report
10 JUL	18:05	Canada	1–3	Australia	23–25	25–23	22–25	19–25		89–98	Report

==== 19th place match ====
Date	Time		Score		Set 1	Set 2	Set 3	Set 4	Set 5	Total	Report
11 JUL	13:35	China	0–3	Canada	17–25	23–25	24–26			64–76	Report

==== 17th place match ====
Date	Time		Score		Set 1	Set 2	Set 3	Set 4	Set 5	Total	Report
11 JUL	13:20	United States	3–2	Australia	32–30	24–26	22–25	25–20	15–11	118–112	Report

=== 9th–16th places ===
9th–16th quarterfinals
9 July
Czech Republic	2
Colombia	3
9 July
Mexico	0
Switzerland	3
9 July
Brazil	2
South Korea	3
9 July
Thailand	3
Venezuela	2

9th–12th semifinals
10 July
Colombia	0
Switzerland	3
10 July
South Korea	3
Thailand	1

9th place match
11 July
Switzerland	2
South Korea	3
11th place match
11 July
Colombia	1
Thailand	3

13th–16th semifinals
10 July
Czech Republic	3
Mexico	0
10 July
Brazil	2
Venezuela	3

13th place match
11 July
Czech Republic	3
Venezuela	1
15th place match
11 July
Mexico	3
Brazil	1

==== 9th–16th quarterfinals ====
Date	Time		Score		Set 1	Set 2	Set 3	Set 4	Set 5	Total	Report
9 JUL	13:00	Brazil	2–3	South Korea	25–23	25–22	24–26	22–25	15–17	111–113	Report
9 JUL	13:15	Czech Republic	2–3	Colombia	22–25	22–25	25–23	26–24	10–15	105–112	Report
9 JUL	15:00	Thailand	3–2	Venezuela	29–27	25–18	16–25	15–25	15–11	100–106	Report
9 JUL	16:10	Mexico	0–3	Switzerland	18–25	21–25	20–25			59–75	Report

==== 13th–16th semifinals ====
Date	Time		Score		Set 1	Set 2	Set 3	Set 4	Set 5	Total	Report
10 JUL	11:00	Czech Republic	3–0	Mexico	25–19	25–15	25–22			75–56	Report
10 JUL	13:00	Brazil	2–3	Venezuela	25–23	20–25	26–24	18–25	13–15	102–112	Report

==== 9th–12th semifinals ====
Date	Time		Score		Set 1	Set 2	Set 3	Set 4	Set 5	Total	Report
10 JUL	13:00	Colombia	0–3	Switzerland	16–25	12–25	22–25			50–75	Report
10 JUL	15:00	South Korea	3–1	Thailand	20–25	25–22	25–16	26–24		96–87	Report

==== 15th place match ====
Date	Time		Score		Set 1	Set 2	Set 3	Set 4	Set 5	Total	Report
11 JUL	11:00	Mexico	3–1	Brazil	26–24	25–17	19–25	27–25		97–91	Report

==== 13th place match ====
Date	Time		Score		Set 1	Set 2	Set 3	Set 4	Set 5	Total	Report
11 JUL	11:00	Czech Republic	3–1	Venezuela	25–21	25–18	19–25	25–19		94–83	Report

==== 11th place match ====
Date	Time		Score		Set 1	Set 2	Set 3	Set 4	Set 5	Total	Report
11 JUL	13:00	Colombia	1–3	Thailand	25–19	16–25	21–25	25–27		87–96	Report

==== 9th place match ====
Date	Time		Score		Set 1	Set 2	Set 3	Set 4	Set 5	Total	Report
11 JUL	15:20	Switzerland	2–3	South Korea	25–21	25–27	17–25	25–22	13–15	105–110	Report

=== 1st-8th ===
Quarterfinals
9 July
Chinese Taipei	3
Chile	0
9 July
Ukraine	3
Iran	2
9 July
Japan	0
Argentina	3
9 July
Russia	3
Latvia	0

Semifinals
10 July
Chinese Taipei	2
Ukraine	3
10 July
Argentina	0
Russia	3

Final
12 July
Ukraine	1
Russia	3
3rd place match
12 July
Chinese Taipei	1
Argentina	3

5th–8th semifinals
10 July
Chile	0
Iran	3
10 July
Japan	3
Latvia	0

5th place match
11 July
Iran	3
Japan	2
7th place match
11 July
Chile	2
Latvia	3

==== Quarterfinals ====
Date	Time		Score		Set 1	Set 2	Set 3	Set 4	Set 5	Total	Report
9 JUL	13:00	Ukraine	3–2	Iran	23–25	15–25	25–21	25–19	15–12	103–102	Report
9 JUL	18:00	Chinese Taipei	3–0	Chile	25–22	28–26	25–22			78–70	Report
9 JUL	18:35	Japan	0–3	Argentina	23–25	19–25	22–25			64–75	Report
9 JUL	20:00	Russia	3–0	Latvia	25–23	25–15	25–23			75–61	Report

==== 5th–8th semifinals ====
Date	Time		Score		Set 1	Set 2	Set 3	Set 4	Set 5	Total	Report
10 JUL	18:00	Chile	0–3	Iran	19–25	15–25	15–25			49–75	Report
10 JUL	20:00	Japan	3–0	Latvia	25–22	25–23	25–22			75–67	Report

==== Semifinals ====
Date	Time		Score		Set 1	Set 2	Set 3	Set 4	Set 5	Total	Report
10 JUL	18:00	Chinese Taipei	2–3	Ukraine	23–25	25–15	20–25	25–16	13–15	106–96	Report
10 JUL	20:25	Argentina	0–3	Russia	16–25	15–25	20–25			51–75	Report

==== 7th place match ====
Date	Time		Score		Set 1	Set 2	Set 3	Set 4	Set 5	Total	Report
11 JUL	15:20	Chile	2–3	Latvia	19–25	25–21	25–19	23–25	15–17	107–107	Report

==== 5th place match ====
Date	Time		Score		Set 1	Set 2	Set 3	Set 4	Set 5	Total	Report
11 JUL	16:03	Iran	3–2	Japan	20–25	29–31	25–23	25–16	15–13	114–108	Report

==== 3rd place match ====
Date	Time		Score		Set 1	Set 2	Set 3	Set 4	Set 5	Total	Report
12 JUL	14:00	Chinese Taipei	1–3	Argentina	25–19	21–25	22–25	22–25		90–94	Report

==== Final ====
Date	Time		Score		Set 1	Set 2	Set 3	Set 4	Set 5	Total	Report
12 JUL	20:00	Ukraine	1–3	Russia	25–27	23–25	25–21	14–25		87–98	Report

== Final standing ==
Rank	Team
1st place, gold medalist(s)	Russia
2nd place, silver medalist(s)	Ukraine
3rd place, bronze medalist(s)	Argentina
4	Chinese Taipei
5	Iran
6	Japan
7	Latvia
8	Chile
9	South Korea
10	Switzerland
11	Thailand
12	Colombia
13	Czech Republic
14	Venezuela
15	Mexico
16	Brazil
17	United States
18	Australia
19	Canada
20	China
21	Hong Kong
