= Taekwondo at the 2015 Summer Universiade =

Taekwondo competition

Taekwondo at the XXVIII Summer Universiade
- Venue: Hwasun Hanium Culture Sports Center
- Dates: July 7, 2015 – July 13, 2015

Taekwondo was contested at the 2015 Summer Universiade from May 7 to 13 at the Chosun University Gymnasium in Gwangju, South Korea.

== Medal summary ==
=== Medal table ===
* Host nation (South Korea)

Rank	Nation	Gold	Silver	Bronze	Total
1	South Korea*	8	4	3	15
2	Iran	5	1	3	9
3	China	4	2	3	9
4	Chinese Taipei	1	3	7	11
5	Turkey	1	1	6	8
6	Thailand	1	1	1	3
7	Belgium	1	1	0	2
8	Kazakhstan	1	0	0	1
8	Uzbekistan	1	0	0	1
10	Croatia	0	2	0	2
10	Mexico	0	2	0	2
10	Portugal	0	2	0	2
13	Russia	0	1	5	6
14	Indonesia	0	1	2	3
15	Ivory Coast	0	1	1	2
16	France	0	1	0	1
17	Spain	0	0	3	3
18	Cyprus	0	0	2	2
18	Serbia	0	0	2	2
18	Vietnam	0	0	2	2
21	Brazil	0	0	1	1
21	Germany	0	0	1	1
21	Great Britain	0	0	1	1
21	Netherlands	0	0	1	1
21	Sweden	0	0	1	1
21	United States	0	0	1	1
Totals (26 entries)		23	23	46	92

=== Events ===
==== Men's events ====
Event	Gold	Silver	Bronze
-54kg (finweight)	Armin Hadipour; Iran	Mourad Laachraoui; Belgium	Kim Dae-ik; South Korea
-54kg (finweight)	Armin Hadipour; Iran	Mourad Laachraoui; Belgium	En Ten Il; Russia
-58kg (flyweight)	Nursultan Mamayev; Kazakhstan	Rui Bragança; Portugal	Javad Amiri; Iran
-58kg (flyweight)	Nursultan Mamayev; Kazakhstan	Rui Bragança; Portugal	Renat Tukhvatullin; Russia
-63kg (bantamweight)	Jaouad Achab; Belgium	Zhao Shuai; China	William Jackson; United States
-63kg (bantamweight)	Jaouad Achab; Belgium	Zhao Shuai; China	Huang Cheng-ching; Chinese Taipei
-68kg (featherweight)	Berkay Akyol; Turkey	Ryu Dae-han; South Korea	Joel González; Spain
-68kg (featherweight)	Berkay Akyol; Turkey	Ryu Dae-han; South Korea	Christian McNeish; Great Britain
-74kg (lightweight)	Ahmad Khosrofar; Iran	Torann Maizeroi; France	Ewald Glesmann; Germany
-74kg (lightweight)	Ahmad Khosrofar; Iran	Torann Maizeroi; France	Said Ustaev; Russia
-80kg (welterweight)	Saeid Rajabi; Iran	Cheick Sallah Cissé; Ivory Coast	Liu Wei-ting; Chinese Taipei
-80kg (welterweight)	Saeid Rajabi; Iran	Cheick Sallah Cissé; Ivory Coast	Wang Guangshuai; China
-87kg (middleweight)	Omid Amidi; Iran	In Kyo-don; South Korea	Ensar Uguz; Turkey
-87kg (middleweight)	Omid Amidi; Iran	In Kyo-don; South Korea	Qiao Sen; China
+87kg (heavyweight)	Dmitriy Shokin; Uzbekistan	Park Yoon-keun; South Korea	Mehran Askari; Iran
+87kg (heavyweight)	Dmitriy Shokin; Uzbekistan	Park Yoon-keun; South Korea	Maicon de Andrade; Brazil
Individual Poomsae	Bae Jong-beom; South Korea	Mehdi Jamali; Iran	Maulana Haidir; Indonesia
Individual Poomsae	Bae Jong-beom; South Korea	Mehdi Jamali; Iran	Wu Chuang; China
Team Poomsae	South Korea (KOR); Jang Se-hoon; Jo Jeong-hun; Lee Gwang-hyun	Indonesia (INA); Maulana Haidir; Fazza Fitracahyo; Abdurrahman Wahyu	Vietnam (VIE); Lê Hiếu Nghĩa; Lê Thành Trung; Nguyễn Thiên Phụng
Team Poomsae	South Korea (KOR); Jang Se-hoon; Jo Jeong-hun; Lee Gwang-hyun	Indonesia (INA); Maulana Haidir; Fazza Fitracahyo; Abdurrahman Wahyu	Chinese Taipei (TPE); Chang Wei-chieh; Chuang Chun-kai; Lu Cheng-lung
Team Kyorugi	South Korea (KOR); In Kyo-don; Kim Dae-ik; Kim Hyeon-seung; Kim Jun-hyeob	China (CHN); Wang Guangshuai; Zhao Panfeng; Qiao Sen; Zhao Shuai	Cyprus (CYP); Demetris Moustakas; Ioannis Pilavakis; Marios Fyllakoudias
Team Kyorugi	South Korea (KOR); In Kyo-don; Kim Dae-ik; Kim Hyeon-seung; Kim Jun-hyeob	China (CHN); Wang Guangshuai; Zhao Panfeng; Qiao Sen; Zhao Shuai	Russia (RUS); Alexey Pryazhnikov; Renat Tukhvatullin; Said Ustaev; Viacheslav Minin

==== Women's events ====
Event	Gold	Silver	Bronze
-46kg (finweight)	Lin Wan-ting; Chinese Taipei	Wilasinee Khamsribusa; Thailand	Yu Su-yeon; South Korea
-46kg (finweight)	Lin Wan-ting; Chinese Taipei	Wilasinee Khamsribusa; Thailand	Kyriaki Kouttouki; Cyprus
-49kg (flyweight)	Chanatip Sonkham; Thailand	Lucija Zaninović; Croatia	Wu Shao-yu; Chinese Taipei
-49kg (flyweight)	Chanatip Sonkham; Thailand	Lucija Zaninović; Croatia	Rukiye Yıldırım; Turkey
-53kg (bantamweight)	Kim Min-jung; South Korea	Huang Yun-wen; Chinese Taipei	Mariska Halinda; Indonesia
-53kg (bantamweight)	Kim Min-jung; South Korea	Huang Yun-wen; Chinese Taipei	Dragana Gladović; Serbia
-57kg (featherweight)	Kim So-hee; South Korea	Joana Cunha; Portugal	Rangsiya Nisaisom; Thailand
-57kg (featherweight)	Kim So-hee; South Korea	Joana Cunha; Portugal	Nikita Glasnović; Sweden
-62kg (lightweight)	Zhang Hua; China	İrem Yaman; Turkey	Ruth Gbagbi; Ivory Coast
-62kg (lightweight)	Zhang Hua; China	İrem Yaman; Turkey	Marta Calvo; Spain
-67kg (welterweight)	Guo Yunfei; China	Chuang Chia-chia; Chinese Taipei	Nur Tatar; Turkey
-67kg (welterweight)	Guo Yunfei; China	Chuang Chia-chia; Chinese Taipei	Ana Bajić; Serbia
-73kg (middleweight)	Zheng Shuyin; China	Iva Rados; Croatia	Reshmie Oogink; Netherlands
-73kg (middleweight)	Zheng Shuyin; China	Iva Rados; Croatia	Furkan Asena Aydin; Turkey
+73kg (heavyweight)	Akram Khodabandeh; Iran	Kim Bich-na; South Korea	Alina Ikaeva; Russia
+73kg (heavyweight)	Akram Khodabandeh; Iran	Kim Bich-na; South Korea	Rosana Simón; Spain
Individual Poomsae	Yang Han-sol; South Korea	Ollin Medina; Mexico	Liao Wen-hsuan; Chinese Taipei
Individual Poomsae	Yang Han-sol; South Korea	Ollin Medina; Mexico	Elif Aybüke Yılmaz; Turkey
Team Poomsae	South Korea (KOR); Choi Hyo-seo; Choi Ji-eun; Gwak Yeo-won	Chinese Taipei (TPE); Chen Hsiang-ting; Chen Yi-hsuan; Lee Ying-hsian	Iran (IRI); Bahareh Ghaderian; Fatemeh Ghasemi; Marjan Salahshouri
Team Poomsae	South Korea (KOR); Choi Hyo-seo; Choi Ji-eun; Gwak Yeo-won	Chinese Taipei (TPE); Chen Hsiang-ting; Chen Yi-hsuan; Lee Ying-hsian	Turkey (TUR); Bengü Alkan; Elif Aybüke Yılmaz; Fatma Torehan
Team Kyorugi	China (CHN); Ren Dandan; Sun Tongtong; Xue Yanhong	Russia (RUS); Alina Ikaeva; Tatiana Kudashova; Elena Evlampyeva; Yulia Turutina	Chinese Taipei (TPE); Chuang Chia-Chia; Huang Kuan-Chi; Huang Yun-Wen; Lin Yi-Ching
Team Kyorugi	China (CHN); Ren Dandan; Sun Tongtong; Xue Yanhong	Russia (RUS); Alina Ikaeva; Tatiana Kudashova; Elena Evlampyeva; Yulia Turutina	South Korea (KOR); Jeon Chae-eun; Kim Min-jeong; Kim So-hee; Lee Da-bin

==== Mixed events ====
Event	Gold	Silver	Bronze
Pairs Poomsae	South Korea (KOR); Gwon Hyeok-in; Lee Jae-hee	Mexico (MEX); Vaslav Ayala; Ollin Medina	Chinese Taipei (TPE); Li Cheng-gang; Chen Yi-hsuan
Pairs Poomsae	South Korea (KOR); Gwon Hyeok-in; Lee Jae-hee	Mexico (MEX); Vaslav Ayala; Ollin Medina	Vietnam (VIE); Nguyễn Thiên Phụng; Châu Tuyết Vân
