= Portugal at the 2015 Summer Universiade =

- IOC code: POR
- NOC: Olympic Committee of Portugal
- Website: http://comiteolimpicoportugal.pt/

in Gwangju, South Korea 3 – 14 July 2015
- Competitors: 224 in 16 sports
- Medals Ranked 33rd: Gold 1 Silver 2 Bronze 1 Total 4

Summer Universiade appearances
- 1959; 1961; 1963; 1965; 1967; 1970; 1973; 1975; 1977; 1979; 1981; 1983; 1985; 1987; 1989; 1991; 1993; 1995; 1997; 1999; 2001; 2003; 2005; 2007; 2009; 2011; 2013; 2015; 2017; 2019; 2021; 2025; 2027

Portugal participated at the 2015 Summer Universiade in Gwangju, South Korea.

== Medal summary ==
=== Medal by sports ===
Medals by sport
Sport	1st place, gold medalist(s)	2nd place, silver medalist(s)	3rd place, bronze medalist(s)	Total
Handball	1	0	0	1
Taekwondo	0	2	0	1
Gymnastics	0	0	1	1
Total	1	2	1	30

=== Medalists ===
Medal	Name	Sport	Event	Date
Gold	Portugal men's national handball team	Handball	Men's Tournament	6–13 July
Silver	Rui Bragança	Taekwondo	Men's -58 kg flyweight	7–13 July
Silver	Joana Cunha	Taekwondo	Women's -57 kg featherweight	7–13 July
Bronze	Ana Filipa Martins	Gymnastics	Women's balance beam	7 July
