= Spain at the 2015 Summer Universiade =

- IOC code: ESP
- NOC: Spanish Olympic Committee
- Website: http://www.coe.es/

in Gwangju, South Korea 3 – 14 July 2015
- Competitors: 17 in 2 sports
- Medals Ranked 56th: Gold 0 Silver 0 Bronze 3 Total 3

Summer Universiade appearances
- 1959; 1961; 1963; 1965; 1967; 1970; 1973; 1975; 1977; 1979; 1981; 1983; 1985; 1987; 1989; 1991; 1993; 1995; 1997; 1999; 2001; 2003; 2005; 2007; 2009; 2011; 2013; 2015; 2017; 2019; 2021; 2025; 2027

Spain participated at the 2015 Summer Universiade in Gwangju, South Korea.

== Medal summary ==
=== Medal by sports ===
Medals by sport
Sport	1st place, gold medalist(s)	2nd place, silver medalist(s)	3rd place, bronze medalist(s)	Total
Taekwondo	0	0	3	3
Total	0	0	3	3

=== Medalists ===
Medal	Name	Sport	Event	Date
Bronze	Joel González	Taekwondo	Men's -68 kg	9 July
Bronze	Rosana Simón	Taekwondo	Women's +73 kg	11 July
Bronze	Marta Calvo	Taekwondo	Women's -62 kg	11 July
