= Iran at the 2015 Summer Universiade =

- IOC code: IRI
- NOC: National Olympic Committee of the Islamic Republic of Iran
- Website: http://www.olympic.ir/

in Gwangju, South Korea 3 – 14 July 2015
- Competitors: 83 in 8 sports
- Medals Ranked 6th: Gold 14 Silver 14 Bronze 14 Total 42

Summer Universiade appearances (overview)
- 1973; 1975; 1977; 1979–2001; 2003; 2005; 2007; 2009; 2011; 2013; 2015; 2017; 2019; 2021; 2025; 2027

Iran participated at the 2015 Summer Universiade in Gwangju, South Korea.

== Medal summary ==
=== Medal by sports ===
Medals by sport
Sport	1st place, gold medalist(s)	2nd place, silver medalist(s)	3rd place, bronze medalist(s)	Total
Shooting	2	1	3	6
Taekwondo	5	1	3	3
Total	7	2	6	15

=== Shooting ===
Medal	Name	Games	Event
Gold	Najmeh Khedmati	2015 Gwangju	Women's 10 m air rifle
Gold	Mahlagha Jambozorg	2015 Gwangju	Women's 50 m rifle prone
Silver	Mahlagha Jambozorg; Najmeh Khedmati; Maryam Talebi	2015 Gwangju	Women's 50 m rifle 3 positions team
Bronze	Najmeh Khedmati	2015 Gwangju	Women's 50 m rifle 3 positions
Bronze	Maedeh Aminzadeh; Mahlagha Jambozorg; Najmeh Khedmati	2015 Gwangju	Women's 10 m air rifle team
Bronze	Mahlagha Jambozorg; Najmeh Khedmati; Maryam Talebi	2015 Gwangju	Women's 50 m rifle prone team

=== Taekwondo ===
Medal	Name	Games	Event
Gold	Armin Hadipour	2015 Gwangju	Men's 54 kg
Gold	Ahmad Khosrofar	2015 Gwangju	Men's 74 kg
Gold	Saeid Rajabi	2015 Gwangju	Men's 80 kg
Gold	Omid Amidi	2015 Gwangju	Men's 87 kg
Gold	Akram Khodabandeh	2015 Gwangju	Women's +73 kg
Silver	Mehdi Jamali	2015 Gwangju	Men's individual poomsae
Bronze	Javad Amiri	2015 Gwangju	Men's 58 kg
Bronze	Mehran Askari	2015 Gwangju	Men's +87 kg
Bronze	Bahareh Ghaderian; Fatemeh Ghasemi; Marjan Salahshouri	2015 Gwangju	Women's team poomsae
