= Indonesia at the 2015 Summer Universiade =

- FINA code: INA
- National federation: Indonesia University Sports Council
- Website: http://www.nocindonesia.or.id/

in Gwangju, South Korea 3 – 14 July 2015
- Competitors: 40 in 6 sports
- Medals Ranked 49th: Gold 0 Silver 1 Bronze 3 Total 4

Summer Universiade appearances
- 1959; 1961; 1963; 1965; 1967; 1970; 1973; 1975; 1977; 1979; 1981; 1983; 1985; 1987; 1989; 1991; 1993; 1995; 1997; 1999; 2001; 2003; 2005; 2007; 2009; 2011; 2013; 2015; 2017; 2019; 2021

Indonesia competes at the 2015 Summer Universiade in Gwangju, South Korea.

== Medal by sports ==
Medals by sport
Sport	1st place, gold medalist(s)	2nd place, silver medalist(s)	3rd place, bronze medalist(s)	Total
Taekwondo	0	1	2	3
Tennis	0	0	1	1
Total	0	1	3	4

== Medalists ==
Medal	Name	Sport	Event	Date
Silver	Maulana Haidir; Muhamad Fitracahyanto; Muhammad Abdurrahman Wahyu	Taekwondo	Men's Team Poomsae	8 July
Bronze	Maulana Haidir	Taekwondo	Men's Individual Poomsae	7 July
Bronze	Beatrice Gumulya	Tennis	Women's Single	11 July
Bronze	Mariska Halinda	Taekwondo	Women's -53 kg	12 July
