= Sweden at the 2015 Summer Universiade =

- IOC code: SWE
- NOC: Swedish Olympic Committee
- Website: http://www.sok.se/

in Gwangju, South Korea 3 – 14 July 2015
- Competitors: 80 in 9 sports
- Medals Ranked 58th: Gold 0 Silver 0 Bronze 2 Total 2

Summer Universiade appearances
- 1959; 1961; 1963; 1965; 1967; 1970; 1973; 1975; 1977; 1979; 1981; 1983; 1985; 1987; 1989; 1991; 1993; 1995; 1997; 1999; 2001; 2003; 2005; 2007; 2009; 2011; 2013; 2015; 2017; 2019; 2021; 2025; 2027

Sweden participated at the 2015 Summer Universiade in Gwangju, South Korea.

== Medal summary ==
=== Medal by sports ===
Medals by sport
Sport	1st place, gold medalist(s)	2nd place, silver medalist(s)	3rd place, bronze medalist(s)	Total
Athletics	0	0	1	1
Taekwondo	0	0	1	1
Total	0	0	2	2

=== Medalists ===
Medal	Name	Sport	Event	Date
Bronze	Nikita Glasnovic	Taekwondo	Women's -57 kg	9 July
Bronze	Staffan Ek	Athletics	Men's 1500m	10 July
