= 2015 Summer Universiade =

Multi-sport event in Gwangju, South Korea

XXVIII Summer Universiade
- Logo of the 2015 Summer Universiade.
- Host city: Gwangju, South Korea
- Motto: Light Up Tomorrow (창조의 빛, 미래의 빛)
- Nations: 140
- Athletes: 7,432
- Events: 272 in 21 sports
- Opening: July 3, 2015
- Closing: July 14, 2015
- Opened by: Park Geun-hye
- Athlete's Oath: Kim Seong-yeon and Kim Kuk-young
- Judge's Oath: Kim Dae-nan and Park Mi-sun
- Torch lighter: Chan Ho Park and Yang Hak-seon
- Main venue: Gwangju World Cup Stadium
- Website: gwangju2015.com (archived)

Summer

Winter

The 2015 Summer Universiade (Korean: 2015년 하계 유니버시아드), officially known as the XXVIII Summer Universiade (제28회 하계 유니버시아드) and also known as Gwangju 2015 (광주 2015) was a multi-sport event for student and youth athletes sanctioned by the International University Sports Federation (FISU), held in the city of Gwangju, South Korea. It took place from July 3 to July 14, 2015.

== Bid selection ==
The cities of Edmonton, Alberta, Canada; Taipei, Taiwan; and Gwangju, South Korea were in initial contention for the Games. Edmonton previously hosted the 1983 Summer Universiade, and all the infrastructure built for those two events was in use and was part of the project, which gave the city a big advantage, but the subprime mortgage crisis in 2008 led the city to withdraw. This left only Gwangju and Taipei at the final phase. On May 23, 2009, FISU awarded the hosting rights to Gwangju.

== Venues ==
=== Gwangju ===
- Gwangju World Cup Stadium: ceremonies, athletics
- Dongkang College Gymnasium: basketball
- Yeomju Gymnasium: volleyball
- Nambu University International Aquatics Center: swimming, diving
- Yeomju Indoor Aquatics Center: water polo
- Yeomju Bitgoeul Gymnasium: judo
- Gwangju Women's University Universiade Gymnasium: gymnastics
- Honam University Football Field: football
- Jinwol International Tennis Court: tennis
- Yeomju Indoor Tennis Court: tennis
- Kim Dae-Jung Convention Center: fencing
- Gwangju KIA Champions Field: baseball
- Mudeung Baseball Stadium: baseball
- Gwangju International Archery Center: archery
- Chosun University Gymnasium: taekwondo
- Honam University Gymnasium: volleyball
- Gwangju University Gymnasium: basketball

=== South Jeolla (Jeonnam) ===
Boseong

- Boseong Public Stadium: football

Gurye

- Gurye Indoor Gymnasium: handball

Hwasun

- Hwasun Hanium Culture Sports Center: badminton

Jangseong

- Jangseong Hong Gil-Dong Gymnasium: table tennis
- Jangseong Lake : marathon swimming

Mokpo

- Mokpo International Football Center: football

Muan

- Muan Indoor Stadium: basketball

Naju

- Dongshin University Gymnasium: volleyball
- Naju Public Stadium: football
- Naju Gold Lake Country Club: golf
- Naju, South Jeolla Province Shooting Range: shooting
- Naju Indoor Stadium: handball

Suncheon

- Palma Gymnasium: volleyball

Yeonggwang

- Yeonggwang Sportium Gymnasium: basketball
- Yeonggwang Sportium Football Field: football

=== North Jeolla (Jeonbuk) ===
Gochang

- Gochang County Gymnasium: handball
- Gochang Public Stadium: football

Jeongeup

- Jeongeup Public Stadium: football

=== North Chungcheong (Chungbuk) ===
Chungju

- Tangeum Lake: rowing

== Identity ==
=== Mascot ===
Nuribi, the official mascot

The official mascot of the 2015 Summer Universiade is an angel of light named Nuribi. The name Nuribi is a combination of the Korean words ‘nuri’ for world and ‘bi’ for fly. It is described as the messenger of light, symbol of Gwangju Universiade vision and bridge of communication of world's youth which spreads hope of creation to deliver light to the world.

=== Slogan ===
The slogan of the 2015 Summer Universiade is "Light Up Tomorrow" (창조의 빛, 미래의 빛; lit. 'Light of the Creation, Light of the Future') which represents the city's identity derived from its name Gwangju, the town of light, its position at the center of 21st-century high-tech industry era, the challenging spirit and passion of the world's youth especially university student athlete at the Universiade, expectations for better performance of athlete, Gwangju's effort to help brighten the future of the world through the Universiade, city's intention to create momentum for sustainable development toward a better future, and will of Guangju to set new standards for universiade.

=== Logo ===
The logo of the 2015 Summer Universiade is the "Wings of Light". Its unique 'U' letter shape resembles the Universiade Games. Overall, it represents the passion of athletes compete against all odds beyond limits, the dynamic atmosphere of sport, and the harmony of nations around the world, and Gwangju's vision to reach worldwide recognition and admiration. 5 blue wings represents the world's oceans and 6 Red wings represents the world's six continents. The overlapping light denotes the harmony and friendship among the world's youth especially university student athlete in the Universiade. The soaring U-shaped wings emitting light symbolize Gwangju as a global city and aiming for greater heights during the universiade.

== Sports ==
- Aquatics
  - Diving (13)
  - Marathon swimming (2)
  - Swimming (42)
  - Water polo (2)
- Athletics (50)
- Archery (10)
- Badminton (7)
- Baseball (1)
- Basketball (2)
- Fencing (12)
- Football (2)
- Golf (4)
- Gymnastics
  - Artistic gymnastics (14)
  - Rhythmic gymnastics (8)
- Handball (2)
- Judo (18)
- Rowing (13)
- Shooting (34)
- Table tennis (7)
- Taekwondo (23)
- Tennis (7)
- Volleyball (2)

== Participants ==
- Afghanistan (3)
- Algeria (34)
- Angola (1)
- Anguilla (2)
- Argentina (81)
- Armenia (12)
- Aruba (2)
- Australia (180)
- Austria (25)
- Azerbaijan (8)
- Bangladesh (2)
- Barbados (2)
- Belarus (22)
- Belgium (35)
- Benin (2)
- Bhutan (8)
- Bosnia and Herzegovina
- Botswana (16)
- Brazil (199)
- Bulgaria (4)
- Burkina Faso (2)
- Burundi (2)
- Cambodia (12)
- Canada (232)
- Chad (1)
- Chile (72)
- China (370)
- Colombia (56)
- Comoros (2)
- Costa Rica (2)
- Croatia (23)
- Cuba (2)
- Curaçao
- Cyprus (19)
- Czech Republic (145)
- Denmark (22)
- Democratic Republic of the Congo (2)
- Dominican Republic (10)
- Ecuador (1)
- El Salvador (2)
- Equatorial Guinea
- Estonia (85)
- Ethiopia (2)
- Finland (78)
- France (224)
- Gabon (5)
- The Gambia (1)
- Georgia
- Germany (115)
- Ghana (17)
- Haiti (3)
- Honduras (1)
- Hong Kong (79)
- Hungary (117)
- India (98)
- Indonesia (40)
- Iran (84)
- Ireland (64)
- Israel (27)
- Italy (205)
- Ivory Coast
- Jamaica (10)
- Japan (350)
- Jordan (22)
- Kazakhstan (94)
- Kenya (9)
- South Korea (379) (host)
- Kyrgyzstan (21)
- Latvia (46)
- Lebanon (52)
- Liberia (1)
- Liechtenstein (1)
- Lithuania (71)
- Luxembourg (10)
- Macedonia
- Madagascar (2)
- Malaysia (107)
- Mali (10)
- Malta (11)
- Mauritius (2)
- Mexico (170)
- Federated States of Micronesia (1)
- Moldova
- Monaco (1)
- Mongolia (99)
- Montenegro (33)
- Morocco (12)
- Mozambique (24)
- Namibia (1)
- Nepal (22)
- Netherlands (58)
- New Zealand (66)
- Niger (2)
- Nigeria (51)
- Northern Mariana Islands
- Norway (53)
- Oman (33)
- Pakistan (8)
- Palestine (2)
- Panama (7)
- Paraguay (3)
- Peru (1)
- Philippines (78)
- Poland (153)
- Portugal (45)
- Qatar (17)
- Romania (58)
- Russia (453)
- Rwanda (2)
- Senegal (7)
- Serbia (92)
- Sierra Leone (16)
- Singapore (18)
- Slovakia (50)
- Slovenia (45)
- Solomon Islands (2)
- South Africa (111)
- Spain (17)
- Sri Lanka (54)
- Suriname (2)
- Swaziland (2)
- Sweden (80)
- Switzerland (103)
- Chinese Taipei (234)
- Tajikistan (8)
- Tanzania (2)
- Thailand (107)
- Trinidad and Tobago
- Tunisia (2)
- Turkey (112)
- Uganda (33)
- Ukraine (134)
- Great Britain (64)
- United States (373)
- Uruguay (39)
- Uzbekistan (34)
- Venezuela (92)
- Vietnam (6)
- Virgin Islands
- Zambia (8)
- Zimbabwe (23)

== Schedule ==
OC	Opening ceremony	●	Event competitions	1	Event finals	CC	Closing ceremony

July	2nd Thu	3rd Fri	4th Sat	5th Sun	6th Mon	7th Tue	8th Wed	9th Thu	10th Fri	11th Sat	12th Sun	13th Mon	14th Tue	Events
Ceremonies		OC											CC	
Archery			●	●	●	5	5							10
Athletics							2	11	14	9	14			50
Badminton					●	●	1		●	●	5			6
Baseball					●	●	●	●	●	1				1
Basketball			●	●	●	●	●	●	●	●	●	2		2
Diving		●	2	2	2	1	1	5						13
Fencing			2	2	2	2	2	2						12
Football	●		●	●	●	●	●	●	●	●	1	1		2
Golf							●	●	●	4				4
Gymnastics			●	2	2	10				●	2	6		22
Handball					●	●	●	●	●	●	●	2		2
Judo			4	4	4	4	2							18
Rowing				●	5	8								13
Shooting				6	7	1	9	5	6					34
Swimming			3	6	6	7	3	7	8	2				42
Table tennis					●	●	●	●	2	1	2	2		7
Taekwondo						2	3	4	4	4	4	2		23
Tennis			●	●	●	●	●	●	●	2	5			7
Volleyball	●	●	●	●	●	●	●	●	●	1	1			2
Water polo	●	●	●	●	●	●	●	●	●	●	●	1	1	2
Total events	0	0	11	22	28	40	28	34	34	24	34	16	1	272
Cumulative total	0	0	11	33	61	101	129	163	197	221	255	271	272	
July	2nd Thu	3rd Fri	4th Sat	5th Sun	6th Mon	7th Tue	8th Wed	9th Thu	10th Fri	11th Sat	12th Sun	13th Mon	14th Tue	Events

== Medal table ==
* Host nation (South Korea)

Rank	Nation	Gold	Silver	Bronze	Total
1	South Korea (KOR)*	47	32	29	108
2	Russia (RUS)	34	39	49	122
3	China (CHN)	34	21	16	71
4	Japan (JPN)	25	25	35	85
5	United States (USA)	20	15	19	54
6	France (FRA)	13	9	8	30
7	Italy (ITA)	11	15	17	43
8	Ukraine (UKR)	8	17	6	31
9	Iran (IRI)	7	2	6	15
10	Chinese Taipei (TPE)	6	12	19	37
11	Kazakhstan (KAZ)	6	0	4	10
12	Germany (GER)	5	5	8	18
13	Lithuania (LTU)	5	1	3	9
14	Poland (POL)	4	10	4	18
15	Australia (AUS)	4	3	12	19
16	Belarus (BLR)	4	3	5	12
17	Great Britain (GBR)	3	4	4	11
18	Czech Republic (CZE)	3	3	3	9
19	Belgium (BEL)	3	1	3	7
20	Thailand (THA)	2	7	9	18
21	Canada (CAN)	2	4	2	8
22	Turkey (TUR)	2	2	12	16
23	Brazil (BRA)	2	2	4	8
24	Mongolia (MGL)	2	1	2	5
25	South Africa (RSA)	2	0	4	6
26	Hungary (HUN)	2	0	3	5
27	Azerbaijan (AZE)	2	0	1	3
28	Dominican Republic (DOM)	2	0	0	2
29	Romania (ROU)	1	3	3	7
30	Jamaica (JAM)	1	3	1	5
30	New Zealand (NZL)	1	3	1	5
32	Serbia (SRB)	1	2	4	7
33	Estonia (EST)	1	2	1	4
33	Portugal (POR)	1	2	1	4
35	India (IND)	1	1	3	5
36	Ireland (IRL)	1	1	1	3
36	Ivory Coast (CIV)	1	1	1	3
38	Cyprus (CYP)	1	0	2	3
39	Armenia (ARM)	1	0	0	1
39	Barbados (BAR)	1	0	0	1
39	Uganda (UGA)	1	0	0	1
39	Uzbekistan (UZB)	1	0	0	1
43	Mexico (MEX)	0	3	2	5
44	Croatia (CRO)	0	3	0	3
44	Morocco (MAR)	0	3	0	3
46	Slovakia (SVK)	0	2	2	4
47	Latvia (LAT)	0	2	1	3
48	Netherlands (NED)	0	1	7	8
49	Indonesia (INA)	0	1	3	4
50	Algeria (ALG)	0	1	0	1
50	Botswana (BOT)	0	1	0	1
50	Burkina Faso (BUR)	0	1	0	1
50	Hong Kong (HKG)	0	1	0	1
50	Norway (NOR)	0	1	0	1
50	Slovenia (SLO)	0	1	0	1
56	Spain (ESP)	0	0	3	3
56	Switzerland (SUI)	0	0	3	3
58	Finland (FIN)	0	0	2	2
58	Malaysia (MAS)	0	0	2	2
58	Sweden (SWE)	0	0	2	2
58	Vietnam (VIE)	0	0	2	2
62	Argentina (ARG)	0	0	1	1
62	Denmark (DEN)	0	0	1	1
62	Kyrgyzstan (KGZ)	0	0	1	1
Totals (64 entries)		274	272	337	883

== See also ==
- Sport in South Korea
