= Kazakhstan at the 2015 Summer Universiade =

- IOC code: KAZ
- NOC: National Olympic Committee of the Republic of Kazakhstan
- Website: http://www.olympic.kz/

in Gwangju, South Korea 3 – 14 July 2015
- Competitors: 94 in 10 sports
- Medals Ranked 11th: Gold 6 Silver 0 Bronze 4 Total 10

Summer Universiade appearances
- 1959; 1961; 1963; 1965; 1967; 1970; 1973; 1975; 1977; 1979; 1981; 1983; 1985; 1987; 1989; 1991; 1993; 1995; 1997; 1999; 2001; 2003; 2005; 2007; 2009; 2011; 2013; 2015; 2017; 2019; 2021; 2025; 2027

Kazakhstan participated at the 2015 Summer Universiade, in Gwangju, South Korea.

== Medals by sport ==
Sport	Grand Total			
Sport	1st place, gold medalist(s)	2nd place, silver medalist(s)	3rd place, bronze medalist(s)	Total
Athletics	4	0	0	4
Judo	0	0	1	1
Shooting	0	0	2	2
Swimming	1	0	1	2
Taekwondo	1	0	0	1
Total	6	0	4	10

== Medalists ==
Medal	Name	Sport	Event	Date
Gold	Dmitriy Balandin	Swimming	Men's 100m Breaststroke	5 July
Gold	Viktoriya Zyabkina	Athletics	Women's 100m	9 July
Gold	Viktoriya Zyabkina	Athletics	Women's 200m	10 July
Gold	Nursultan Mamayev	Taekwondo	Men's -58 kg	10 July
Gold	Nikita Filippov	Athletics	Men's Pole Vault	11 July
Gold	Viktoriya Zyabkina; Yuliya Rakhmanova; Svetlana Ivanchukova; Anastassiya Tulapina	Athletics	Women's 4 × 100 m Relay	12 July
Bronze	Zhanar Kashkyn	Judo	Women's -70 kg	5 July
Bronze	Assem Orynbay; Zhaniya Aidarkhanova; Angelina Michshuk	Shooting	Women's Skeet Team	8 July
Bronze	Andrey Frolov; Alexandr Yechshenko; Vladimir Pochivakov	Shooting	Men's Skeet Team	9 July
Bronze	Dmitriy Balandin	Swimming	Men's 50m Breaststroke	9 July
