= Belgium at the 2015 Summer Universiade =

- IOC code: BEL
- NOC: Belgian Olympic Committee

in Gwangju, South Korea 3 – 14 July 2015
- Competitors: 37 in 8 sports
- Medals Ranked 19th: Gold 3 Silver 1 Bronze 3 Total 7

Summer Universiade appearances
- 1959; 1961; 1963; 1965; 1967; 1970; 1973; 1975; 1977; 1979; 1981; 1983; 1985; 1987; 1989; 1991; 1993; 1995; 1997; 1999; 2001; 2003; 2005; 2007; 2009; 2011; 2013; 2015; 2017; 2019; 2021

Belgium participated at the 2015 Summer Universiade in Gwangju, South Korea.

== Medal summary ==
=== Medal by sports ===
Medals by sport
| Sport | 1st place, gold medalist(s) | 2nd place, silver medalist(s) | 3rd place, bronze medalist(s) | Total |
|---|---|---|---|---|
| Archery | 0 | 0 | 2 | 2 |
| Athletics | 2 | 0 | 1 | 3 |
| Taekwondo | 1 | 1 | 0 | 2 |
| Total | 3 | 1 | 3 | 7 |

=== Medalists ===
| Medal | Name | Sport | Event | Date |
|---|---|---|---|---|
| Gold | Thomas van der Plaetsen | Athletics | Men's Decathlon | 9 July |
| Gold | Philip Milanov | Athletics | Men's Discus Throw | 11 July |
| Gold | Jaouad Achab | Taekwondo | Men's -63 kg (bantamweight) | 12 July |
| Silver | Mourad Laachraoui | Taekwondo | Men's -54 kg (finweight) | 9 July |
| Bronze | Renaud Domanski | Archery | Men's Compound Individual | 7 July |
| Bronze | Renaud Domanski; Sarah Prieels | Archery | Mixed Compound Team | 7 July |
| Bronze | Chloé Henry | Athletics | Women's Pole Vault | 9 July |
