= Switzerland at the 2015 Summer Universiade =

- IOC code: SUI
- NOC: Swiss Olympic Association
- Website: http://www.swissolympic.ch/

in Gwangju, South Korea 3 – 14 July 2015
- Competitors: 103 in 13 sports
- Medals Ranked 56th: Gold 0 Silver 0 Bronze 3 Total 3

Summer Universiade appearances
- 1959; 1961; 1963; 1965; 1967; 1970; 1973; 1975; 1977; 1979; 1981; 1983; 1985; 1987; 1989; 1991; 1993; 1995; 1997; 1999; 2001; 2003; 2005; 2007; 2009; 2011; 2013; 2015; 2017; 2019; 2021; 2025; 2027

Switzerland participated at the 2015 Summer Universiade in Gwangju, South Korea.

== Medal summary ==
=== Medal by sports ===
Medals by sport
| Sport | 1st place, gold medalist(s) | 2nd place, silver medalist(s) | 3rd place, bronze medalist(s) | Total |
|---|---|---|---|---|
| Gymnastics | 0 | 0 | 1 | 1 |
| Handball | 0 | 0 | 1 | 1 |
| Judo | 0 | 0 | 1 | 1 |
| Total | 0 | 0 | 3 | 3 |

=== Medalists ===
| Medal | Name | Sport | Event | Date |
|---|---|---|---|---|
| Bronze | Evelyne Tschopp | Judo | Women's -52 kg | 6 July |
| Bronze | Marco Walter | Gymnastics | Men's Floor Exercise | 7 July |
| Bronze | Flavio Wick; Jost Bruecker; Marvin Lier; Nicolas Raemy; Bjoern Froehlich; Fabio Baviera; Tobias Wetzel; Dominic Rosenberg; Jonas Daehler; Lukas Von Deschwanden; Thomas Hofstetter; Valentin Striffeler; Severin Ramseier; Filip Maros; Kaspar Arn; Tobias Baumgartner | Handball | Men | 13 July |
