= Finland at the 2015 Summer Universiade =

- IOC code: FIN
- NOC: Finnish Olympic Committee
- Website: http://www.sport.fi/olympiakomitea

in Gwangju, South Korea 3 – 14 July 2015
- Competitors: 84 in 13 sports
- Medals Ranked 58th: Gold 0 Silver 0 Bronze 2 Total 2

Summer Universiade appearances
- 1959; 1961; 1963; 1965; 1967; 1970; 1973; 1975; 1977; 1979; 1981; 1983; 1985; 1987; 1989; 1991; 1993; 1995; 1997; 1999; 2001; 2003; 2005; 2007; 2009; 2011; 2013; 2015; 2017; 2019; 2021; 2025; 2027

Finland participated at the 2015 Summer Universiade in Gwangju, South Korea.

== Medal summary ==
=== Medal by sports ===
Medals by sport
Sport	1st place, gold medalist(s)	2nd place, silver medalist(s)	3rd place, bronze medalist(s)	Total
Gymnastics	0	0	2	2
Total	0	0	2	2

=== Medalists ===
Medal	Name	Sport	Event	Date
Bronze	Sonja Kokkonen; Heleri Kolkkanen; Iina Alexandra Linna; Aino Riikka Purje; Kati Iina Rantsi	Gymnastics	Group All-Around	12 July
Bronze	Sonja Kokkonen; Heleri Kolkkanen; Iina Alexandra Linna; Aino Riikka Purje; Kati Iina Rantsi	Gymnastics	Group – 5 ribbons	13 July
