= Poland at the 2015 Summer Universiade =

- IOC code: POL
- NOC: Polish Olympic Committee
- Website: http://www.pkol.pl/

in Gwangju, South Korea 3 – 14 July 2015
- Competitors: 153 in 12 sports
- Medals Ranked 14th: Gold 4 Silver 10 Bronze 4 Total 18

Summer Universiade appearances
- 1959; 1961; 1963; 1965; 1967; 1970; 1973; 1975; 1977; 1979; 1981; 1983; 1985; 1987; 1989; 1991; 1993; 1995; 1997; 1999; 2001; 2003; 2005; 2007; 2009; 2011; 2013; 2015; 2017; 2019; 2021

Poland participated at the 2015 Summer Universiade in Gwangju, South Korea.

== Medal summary ==
=== Medal by sports ===
Medals by sport
Sport	1st place, gold medalist(s)	2nd place, silver medalist(s)	3rd place, bronze medalist(s)	Total
Athletics	3	6	3	12
Fencing	0	0	1	1
Rowing	1	2	0	3
Shooting	0	2	0	2
Total	4	10	4	18

=== Medalists ===
Medal	Name	Sport	Event	Date
Gold	Jerzy Kowalski	Rowing	Men's Lightweight Single Sculls	7 July
Gold	Paweł Fajdek	Athletics	Men's Hammer Throw	9 July
Gold	Joanna Linkiewicz	Athletics	Women's 400m Hurdles	10 July
Gold	Małgorzata Hołub; Monika Szczęsna; Joanna Linkiewicz; Justyna Święty	Athletics	Women's 4x400m Relay	12 July
Silver	Monika Kowalska; Martyna Mikolajczak	Rowing	Women's Lightweight Double Sculls	6 July
Silver	Dawid Grabowski; Adam Wicenciak	Rowing	Men's Double Sculls	7 July
Silver	Bartosz Jasiecki	Shooting	Men's 50m Rifle Prone	8 July
Silver	Bartosz Jasiecki; Maciej Wojtasiak; Pawel Pietruk	Shooting	Men's 50m Rifle Prone Team	8 July
Silver	Anna Jagaciak-Michalska	Athletics	Women's Long Jump	9 July
Silver	Małgorzata Hołub	Athletics	Women's 400m	10 July
Silver	Emilia Ankiewicz	Athletics	Women's 400m Hurdles	10 July
Silver	Joanna Fiodorow	Athletics	Women's Hammer Throw	11 July
Silver	Paulina Guba	Athletics	Women's Shot Put	11 July
Silver	Adam Pawłowski; Grzegorz Zimniewicz; Artur Zaczek; Kamil Kryński; Jakub Adamski	Athletics	Men's 4x100m Relay	12 July
Bronze	Marta Wiktoria Puda	Fencing	Women's Sabre Individual	6 July
Bronze	Robert Sobera	Athletics	Men's Pole Vault	11 July
Bronze	Anna Jagaciak-Michalska	Athletics	Women's Triple Jump	11 July
Bronze	Mateusz Zagórski; Michał Pietrzak; Kamil Gurdak; Rafał Omelko; Robert Bryliński	Athletics	Men's 4x400m Relay	12 July
