= Tennis at the 2015 Summer Universiade – Men's doubles =

Men's doubles
- Tennis at the 2015 Summer Universiade

Final
- Champions: Joe Salisbury (GBR); Darren Walsh (GBR)
- Runners-up: Chung Hyeon (KOR); Nam Ji-sung (KOR)
- Score: 2–6, 6–3, [10–8]

Events
Singles	men	women
Doubles	men	women	mixed
Team	men	women
← 2013 ·	Summer Universiade	· 2017 →

The men's doubles tennis event at the 2015 Summer Universiade was held from July 5 to 11 at the Jawol International Tennis Court in Gwangju, South Korea.

Joe Salisbury and Darren Walsh of Great Britain won the gold medal, defeating Chung Hyeon and Nam Ji-sung of South Korea in the final, 2–6, 6–3, [10–8]

Lee Hsin-han and Peng Hsien-yin of Chinese Taipei and Shintaro Imai and Kaito Uesugi of Japan won the bronze medals.

== Seeds ==
All seeds receive a bye into the second round.

1. Lee Hsin-han / Peng Hsien-yin (TPE) (semifinals; Bronze medalists)
2. Joe Salisbury / Darren Walsh (GBR) (champions; Gold medalists)
3. Chung Hyeon / Nam Ji-sung (KOR) (final; Silver medalists)
4. Pruchya Isaro / Nuttanon Kadchapanan (THA) (quarterfinals)
5. Aslan Karatsev / Evgeny Tyurnev (RUS) (second round)
6. Chandril Sood / Lakshit Sood (IND) (third round)
7. Shonigmatjon Shofayziev / Pavel Tsoy (UZB) (second round)
8. Mikołaj Jędruszczak / Maciej Smoła (POL) (quarterfinals)

== Draw ==
=== Key ===
- Q = Qualifier
- WC = Wild card
- LL = Lucky loser
- Alt = Alternate
- ITF = ITF entry
- PR = Protected ranking
- SR = Special ranking
- SE = Special exempt
- JE = Junior exempt
- JR = Junior Accelerator Programme entrant
- CO = College Accelerator Programme entrant
- NG = Next Gen Accelerator Program entrant
- w/o = Walkover
- r = Retired
- d = Defaulted

=== Finals ===
Quarterfinals
1	Lee Hsin-han (TPE); Peng Hsien-yin (TPE)	6	7
Wong Chun-hun (HKG); Yeung Pak-long (HKG)	4	5
3	Chung Hyeon (KOR); Nam Ji-sung (KOR)	6	6
8	Mikołaj Jędruszczak (POL); Maciej Smoła (POL)	4	2
Shintaro Imai (JPN); Kaito Uesugi (JPN)	5	6	[11]
4	Pruchya Isaro (THA); Nuttanon Kadchapanan (THA)	7	4	[9]
Alejandro Moreno (MEX); Marco Aurelio Núñez (MEX)	3	4
2	Joe Salisbury (GBR); Darren Walsh (GBR)	6	6

Semifinals
1	Lee Hsin-han (TPE); Peng Hsien-yin (TPE)	4	6^{4}
3	Chung Hyeon (KOR); Nam Ji-sung (KOR)	6	7^{7}
Shintaro Imai (JPN); Kaito Uesugi (JPN)	6	3	[8]
2	Joe Salisbury (GBR); Darren Walsh (GBR)	4	6	[10]

Final
3	Chung Hyeon (KOR); Nam Ji-sung (KOR)	6	3	[8]
2	Joe Salisbury (GBR); Darren Walsh (GBR)	2	6	[10]

=== Top half ===
==== Section 1 ====
First round
A Baroz (SUI); P Eichenberger (SUI)	w/o
A Ernepesov (TKM); G Gurbanberdiyev (TKM)

Second round
1	H-h Lee (TPE); H-y Peng (TPE)	6	6
A Baroz (SUI); P Eichenberger (SUI)	1	2
B Nyamdelger (MGL); O Tsogt (MGL)	6	6
M El Tannir (LIB); M Zogheib (LIB)	4	2
C-h Wong (HKG); P-l Yeung (HKG)	6^{5}	6	[10]
A Day (CAN); R Trkulja (CAN)	7^{7}	0	[3]
T Chitemamwise (ZIM); T Mufunda (ZIM)	0	1
6	C Sood (IND); L Sood (IND)	6	6

Third round
1	H-h Lee (TPE); H-y Peng (TPE)	6	6
B Nyamdelger (MGL); O Tsogt (MGL)	1	1
C-h Wong (HKG); P-l Yeung (HKG)	6	6
6	C Sood (IND); L Sood (IND)	2	4

Quarterfinals
1	H-h Lee (TPE); H-y Peng (TPE)	6	7
C-h Wong (HKG); P-l Yeung (HKG)	4	5

==== Section 2 ====
First round

Second round
3	H Chung (KOR); J-s Nam (KOR)	6	6
CI Adato (PHI); JR Sanchez (PHI)	0	0
A Abdulreda (QAT); J Al Marri (QAT)	2	1
S López (COL); R Solórzano (COL)	6	6
Q Dong (CHN); D Zhu (CHN)	0	6	[7]
L Chaix (FRA); L Poullain (FRA)	6	0	[10]
NA Iswan (INA); A Rahman (INA)	2	1
8	M Jędruszczak (POL); M Smoła (POL)	6	6

Third round
3	H Chung (KOR); J-s Nam (KOR)	6	6
S López (COL); R Solórzano (COL)	2	1
L Chaix (FRA); L Poullain (FRA)	4	3
8	M Jędruszczak (POL); M Smoła (POL)	6	6

Quarterfinals
3	H Chung (KOR); J-s Nam (KOR)	6	6
8	M Jędruszczak (POL); M Smoła (POL)	4	2

=== Bottom half ===
==== Section 3 ====
First round

Second round
7	S Shofayziev (UZB); P Tsoy (UZB)	4	2
S Imai (JPN); K Uesugi (JPN)	6	6
Y Narkevich (BLR); A Vasilevski (BLR)	6	6
F Brown Moia (ARG); G Carra (ARG)	1	4
S Muzondiwa (BOT); A Sibanda (BOT)	1	1
S Syed Naguib (MAS); M Zainal (MAS)	6	6
M Deviatiarov (UKR); V Orlov (UKR)	7^{7}	1	[6]
4	P Isaro (THA); N Kadchapanan (THA)	6^{5}	6	[10]

Third round
S Imai (JPN); K Uesugi (JPN)	7	7
Y Narkevich (BLR); A Vasilevski (BLR)	5	5
S Syed Naguib (MAS); M Zainal (MAS)	4	6^{5}
4	P Isaro (THA); N Kadchapanan (THA)	6	7^{7}

Quarterfinals
S Imai (JPN); K Uesugi (JPN)	5	6	[11]
4	P Isaro (THA); N Kadchapanan (THA)	7	4	[9]

==== Section 4 ====
First round
NN De Silva (SRI); I Wettasinghe (SRI)	1^{r}
V Mfuni (ZAM); H Zulu (ZAM)	0

Second round
5	A Karatsev (RUS); E Tyurnev (RUS)	6	2	[5]
A Moreno (MEX); MA Núñez (MEX)	3	6	[10]
A Álvarez (VEN); J Figueroa (VEN)	6	6
R Križaj (SLO); Ž Papež (SLO)	3	3
T Bitencourt (BRA); V Cruz Morales (BRA)	1	2
A Rapp (USA); M Redlicki (USA)	6	6
V Mfuni (ZAM); H Zulu (ZAM)	1	0
2	J Salisbury (GBR); D Walsh (GBR)	6	6

Third round
A Moreno (MEX); MA Núñez (MEX)	7^{7}	6
A Álvarez (VEN); J Figueroa (VEN)	6^{5}	1
A Rapp (USA); M Redlicki (USA)	1	4
2	J Salisbury (GBR); D Walsh (GBR)	6	6

Quarterfinals
A Moreno (MEX); MA Núñez (MEX)	3	4
2	J Salisbury (GBR); D Walsh (GBR)	6	6
