= Tennis at the 2015 Summer Universiade – Men's singles =

Men's singles
- Tennis at the 2015 Summer Universiade

Final
- Champion: Chung Hyeon (KOR)
- Runner-up: Aslan Karatsev (RUS)
- Score: 1–6, 6–2, 6–0

Events
Singles	men	women
Doubles	men	women	mixed
Team	men	women
← 2013 ·	Summer Universiade	· 2017 →

The men's singles tennis event at the 2015 Summer Universiade was held from July 4 to 12 at the Jawol International Tennis Court in Gwangju, South Korea.

Chung Hyeon of South Korea won the gold medal, defeating Aslan Karatsev of Russia in the final, 1–6, 6–2, 6–0.

Lucas Poullain of France and Yang Tsung-hua of Chinese Taipei won the bronze medals.

== Seeds ==
All sixteen seeds receive a bye into the second round.

1. Chung Hyeon (KOR) (champion; Gold medalist)
2. Aslan Karatsev (RUS) (final; Silver medalist)
3. Yang Tsung-hua (TPE) (semifinals; Bronze medalist)
4. Huang Liang-chi (TPE) (fourth round)
5. Evgeny Tyurnev (RUS) (fourth round)
6. Marat Deviatiarov (UKR) (quarterfinals)
7. Antoine Hoang (FRA) (quarterfinals)
8. Andrei Vasilevski (BLR) (fourth round; retired)
9. Pruchya Isaro (THA) (quarterfinals)
10. Joe Salisbury (GBR) (third round)
11. Patrick Ofner (AUT) (fourth round)
12. Shintaro Imai (JPN) (quarterfinals)
13. Phasawit Burapharittha (THA) (fourth round)
14. Ronit Singh Bisht (IND) (third round; withdrew)
15. Mark Whitehouse (GBR) (third round)
16. Maciej Smoła (POL) (third round)

== Main draw ==
=== Key ===
- Q = Qualifier
- WC = Wild card
- LL = Lucky loser
- Alt = Alternate
- ITF = ITF entry
- PR = Protected ranking
- SR = Special ranking
- SE = Special exempt
- JE = Junior exempt
- JR = Junior Accelerator Programme entrant
- CO = College Accelerator Programme entrant
- NG = Next Gen Accelerator Program entrant
- w/o = Walkover
- r = Retired
- d = Defaulted

=== Finals ===
Quarterfinals
1	Chung Hyeon (KOR)	6	6
6	Marat Deviatiarov (UKR)	0	2
Lucas Poullain (FRA)	6	6
9	Pruchya Isaro (THA)	1	3
7	Antoine Hoang (FRA)	3	2
3	Yang Tsung-hua (TPE)	6	6
12	Shintaro Imai (JPN)	6^{2}	0
2	Aslan Karatsev (RUS)	7^{7}	6

Semifinals
1	Chung Hyeon (KOR)	6	3	7^{7}
Lucas Poullain (FRA)	3	6	6^{5}
3	Yang Tsung-hua (TPE)	4	7	3
2	Aslan Karatsev (RUS)	6	5	6

Final
1	Chung Hyeon (KOR)	1	6	6
2	Aslan Karatsev (RUS)	6	2	0

=== Top half ===
==== Section 1 ====
First round
R Trkulja (CAN)	3	3
R Hemmeler (SUI)	6	6

Second round
1	H Chung (KOR)	6	6
R Hemmeler (SUI)	4	0
A Levandi (EST)	1	2
H Heliövaara (FIN)	6	6
M Redlicki (USA)	6	6
V Cruz Moraes (BRA)	4	3
A Abdulreda (QAT)	1	4
14	RS Bisht (IND)	6	6

Third round
1	H Chung (KOR)	5	6	6
H Heliövaara (FIN)	7	1	2
M Redlicki (USA)	w/o
14	RS Bisht (IND)

Fourth round
1	H Chung (KOR)	6	6
M Redlicki (USA)	3	1

==== Section 2 ====
First round
A Gurbanov (TKM)	w/o
S Jalloh (SLE)	w/o
KB Ocampo (PHI)	0	0
M Ratsifandrihamanana (MAD)	6	6

Second round
10	J Salisbury (GBR)
Bye
DD De Silva (SRI)	0	0
M Shiga (JPN)	6	6
C-h Wong (HKG)	6	6
M Zainal (MAS)	2	2
M Ratsifandrihamanana (MAD)	0	0
6	M Deviatiarov (UKR)	6	6

Third round
10	J Salisbury (GBR)	7^{7}	1	2
M Shiga (JPN)	6^{3}	6	6
C-h Wong (HKG)	3	3
6	M Deviatiarov (UKR)	6	6

Fourth round
M Shiga (JPN)	5	4
6	M Deviatiarov (UKR)	7	6

==== Section 3 ====
First round
O Tsogt (MGL)	1	4
H Zulu (ZAM)	6	6
M El Tannir (LIB)	0	0
Y Narkevich (BLR)	6	6

Second round
4	L-c Huang (TPE)	6	6
H Zulu (ZAM)	0	0
JA Vera (MEX)	0	3
F Doležel (CZE)	6	6
L Poullain (FRA)	6	6
A Sibanda (BOT)	0	1
Y Narkevich (BLR)	4	2
16	M Smoła (POL)	6	6

Third round
4	L-c Huang (TPE)	6	6
F Doležel (CZE)	1	4
L Poullain (FRA)	6	6
16	M Smoła (POL)	3	2

Fourth round
4	L-c Huang (TPE)	6	3	2
L Poullain (FRA)	4	6	6

==== Section 4 ====
First round
L Aranguren (ARG)	6	6
R Solórzano (COL)	2	1
A Álvarez (VEN)	5	4
D Zhu (CHN)	7	6

Second round
9	P Isaro (THA)	6	6
L Aranguren (ARG)	3	3
T Chitemamwise (ZIM)
S Shofayziev (UZB)	w/o
Ž Papež (SLO)	3	1
NA Iswan (INA)	6	6
D Zhu (CHN)	3	3
5	E Tyurnev (RUS)	6	6

Third round
9	P Isaro (THA)	7^{9}	6
S Shofayziev (UZB)	6^{7}	1
NA Iswan (INA)	1	2
5	E Tyurnev (RUS)	6	6

Fourth round
9	P Isaro (THA)	6	6
5	E Tyurnev (RUS)	3	1

=== Bottom half ===
==== Section 5 ====
First round
V Mfuni (ZAM)	2	1
A Vampa (ARG)	6	6
T Bitencourt (BRA)	6	6
A Rahman (INA)	3	2

Second round
7	A Hoang (FRA)	6	6
A Vampa (ARG)	1	1
A Taifour (JOR)
S-f Lam (HKG)	w/o
A Day (CAN)	6	6
S López (COL)	3	3
T Bitencourt (BRA)	2	2
11	P Ofner (AUT)	6	6

Third round
7	A Hoang (FRA)	6	6
S-f Lam (HKG)	3	1
A Day (CAN)	1	3
11	P Ofner (AUT)	6	6

Fourth round
7	A Hoang (FRA)	6	6
11	P Ofner (AUT)	1	1

==== Section 6 ====
First round
M Rokaya (NEP)	w/o
M Kamara (SLE)	w/o
S Muzondiwa (BOT)	w/o
T Mufunda (ZIM)

Second round
13	P Burapharittha (THA)
Bye
I Wettasinghe (SRI)
S Diallo (MLI)	w/o
S Syed Naguib (MAS)	6	6
M Avetisyan (ARM)	2	3
S Muzondiwa (BOT)	2	1
3	T-h Yang (TPE)	6	6

Third round
13	P Burapharittha (THA)	6	3	6
S Diallo (MLI)	2	6	1
S Syed Naguib (MAS)	4	4
3	T-h Yang (TPE)	6	6

Fourth round
13	P Burapharittha (THA)	1	4
3	T-h Yang (TPE)	6	6

==== Section 7 ====
First round
R Križaj (SLO)	2	1
A Baroz (SUI)	6	6
B Nyamdelger (MGL)	0	0
S Thompson (AUS)	6	6

Second round
8	A Vasilevski (BLR)	7	6
A Baroz (SUI)	5	2
DE Wulff (VEN)	1	3
E Antony (IND)	6	6
M Jędruszczaj (POL)	w/o
A Ernepesov (TKM)
S Thompson (AUS)	5	2
12	S Imai (JPN)	7	6

Third round
8	A Vasilevski (BLR)	6	6
E Antony (IND)	3	4
M Jędruszczaj (POL)	2	5
12	S Imai (JPN)	6	7

Fourth round
8	A Vasilevski (BLR)	5	0^{r}
12	S Imai (JPN)	7	0

==== Section 8 ====
First round
A Al Saegh (QAT)	w/o
Y Du (CHN)
A Rapp (USA)	2	7	6^{3}
JC Vásquez (MEX)	6	5	7^{7}

Second round
15	M Whitehouse (GBR)	6	1
A Al Saegh (QAT)	0	1^{r}
V Orlov (UKR)	3	1
J Lee (KOR)	6	6
P Tsoy (UZB)	6	6
M Zogheib (LIB)	0	0
JC Vásquez (MEX)	3	6^{3}
2	A Karatsev (RUS)	6	7^{7}

Third round
15	M Whitehouse (GBR)	5	6^{5}
J Lee (KOR)	7	7^{7}
P Tsoy (UZB)	3	5
2	A Karatsev (RUS)	6	7

Fourth round
J Lee (KOR)	6	2	0
2	A Karatsev (RUS)	3	6	6

== Consolation draw ==
=== Key ===
- Q = Qualifier
- WC = Wild card
- LL = Lucky loser
- Alt = Alternate
- ITF = ITF entry
- PR = Protected ranking
- SR = Special ranking
- SE = Special exempt
- JE = Junior exempt
- JR = Junior Accelerator Programme entrant
- CO = College Accelerator Programme entrant
- NG = Next Gen Accelerator Program entrant
- w/o = Walkover
- r = Retired
- d = Defaulted

=== Consolation finals ===
Semifinals
Abrahán Álvarez (VEN)	2	1
Kaito Uesugi (JPN)	6	6
Daiki Kondo (JPN)	3	6	[10]
Louis Chaix (FRA)	6	3	[7]

Final
Kaito Uesugi (JPN)	6	3	[3]
Daiki Kondo (JPN)	4	6	[10]

=== Top half ===
First round
V Mfuni (ZAM)	2	2
M Zainal (MAS)	6	6
G Carra (ARG)	3	3
A Álvarez (VEN)	6	6
S Muzondiwa (BOT)	5
T Chitemamwise (ZIM)	0^{r}
M Zogheib (LIB)	0	1
R Križaj (SLO)	6	6
DE Wulff (VEN)	6	6
R Solórzano (COL)	2	4

Second round
Ho Chung (KOR)
M Zainal (MAS)	w/o
A Álvarez (VEN)	6	6
S Muzondiwa (BOT)	2	4
K Uesugi (JPN)	6	6
R Križaj (SLO)	3	1
DE Wulff (VEN)	w/o
M Avetisyan (ARM)

Quarterfinals
M Zainal (MAS)	4	2
A Álvarez (VEN)	6	6
K Uesugi (JPN)	6	6
DE Wulff (VEN)	0	3

Semifinals
A Álvarez (VEN)	2	1
K Uesugi (JPN)	6	6

=== Bottom half ===
First round
A Rapp (USA)	w/o
KB Ocamp (PHI)
D Kondo (JPN)	6	6
S López (COL)	2	3
J Figueroa (VEN)	6^{6}	4
R Trkulja (CAN)	7^{8}	6
JA Vera (MEX)	6	6
M El Tannir (LIB)	1	0
T Mufuna (ZIM)	2	2
A Sibanda (BOT)	6	6
A Levandi (EST)	4	7	[10]
F Brown Moia (ARG)	6	5	[5]

Second round
A Rapp (USA)	4	2
D Kondo (JPN)	6	6
R Trkulja (CAN)	6	6
Ž Papež (SLO)	1	3
JA Vera (MEX)	6	1	[8]
A Sibanda (BOT)	2	6	[10]
A Levandi (EST)	3	7^{7}	[6]
L Chaix (FRA)	6	6^{3}	[10]

Quarterfinals
D Kondo (JPN)	4
R Trkulja (CAN)	2^{r}
A Sibanda (BOT)	0	3
L Chaix (FRA)	6	6

Semifinals
D Kondo (JPN)	3	6	[10]
L Chaix (FRA)	6	3	[7]
