= Tennis at the 2015 Summer Universiade – Women's doubles =

Women's doubles
- Tennis at the 2015 Summer Universiade

Final
- Champions: Han Na-lae (KOR); Lee So-ra (KOR)
- Runners-up: Hsu Chieh-yu (TPE); Lee Ya-hsuan (TPE)
- Score: 6–4, 6–4

Events
Singles	men	women
Doubles	men	women	mixed
Team	men	women
← 2013 ·	Summer Universiade	· 2017 →

The women's doubles tennis event at the 2015 Summer Universiade was held from July 5 to 11 at the Jawol International Tennis Court in Gwangju, South Korea.

Han Na-lae and Lee So-ra of South Korea won the gold medal defeating Hsu Chieh-yu and Lee Ya-hsuan of Chinese Taipei in the final, 6–4, 6–4.

Erina Hayashi and Aiko Yoshitomi of Japan and Noppawan Lertcheewakarn and Varatchaya Wongteanchai of Thailand won the bronze medals.

== Seeds ==
All seeds receive a bye into the second round.

1. Hsu Chieh-yu / Lee Ya-hsuan (TPE) (final; Silver medalists)
2. Noppawan Lertcheewakarn / Varatchaya Wongteanchai (THA) (semifinals; Bronze medalists)
3. Veronika Kudermetova / Ksenia Lykina (RUS) (quarterfinals)
4. Lu Jiajing / Tian Ran (CHN) (quarterfinals)
5. Han Na-lae / Lee So-ra (KOR) (champions; Gold medalists)
6. Polina Merenkova / Sabina Sharipova (UZB) (first round)
7. Lidziya Marozava / Viktoryia Mun (BLR) (second round)
8. Eudice Chong / Wu Ho-ching (HKG) (first round)

== Draw ==
=== Key ===
- Q = Qualifier
- WC = Wild card
- LL = Lucky loser
- Alt = Alternate
- ITF = ITF entry
- PR = Protected ranking
- SR = Special ranking
- SE = Special exempt
- JE = Junior exempt
- JR = Junior Accelerator Programme entrant
- CO = College Accelerator Programme entrant
- NG = Next Gen Accelerator Program entrant
- w/o = Walkover
- r = Retired
- d = Defaulted

=== Finals ===
Semifinals
1	Hsu Chieh-yu (TPE); Lee Ya-hsuan (TPE)	6	6
Erina Hayashi (JPN); Aiko Yoshitomi (JPN)	3	0
5	Han Na-lae (KOR); Lee So-ra (KOR)	6	6
2	Noppawan Lertcheewakarn (THA); Varatchaya Wongteanchai (THA)	1	4

Final
1	Hsu Chieh-yu (TPE); Lee Ya-hsuan (TPE)	4	4
5	Han Na-lae (KOR); Lee So-ra (KOR)	6	6

=== Top half ===
First round
A Bacquié (FRA); M Noël (FRA)	4	1
L Kwong (CAN); E Repic (CAN)	6	6
S Cabrera (COL); P Rodríguez (COL)	6	6
M Himashi (SRI); A Seneviratne (SRI)	1	0
U Castillejos (MEX); A Guzmán (MEX)	2	6	[10]
8	E Chong (HKG); H-c Wu (HKG)	6	2	[4]
B Gumulya (INA); J Rompies (INA)	w/o
M Mammetgulyyeva (TKM); A Prenko (TKM)
D Linarez (VEN); D Sáez (VEN)	7	6
K Ray (USA); C Van Nguyen (USA)	5	2
E Hayashi (JPN); A Yoshitomi (JPN)	6	7
6	P Merenkova (UZB); S Sharipova (UZB)	2	5

Second round
1	C-y Hsu (TPE); Y-h Lee (TPE)	6	6
L Kwong (CAN); E Repic (CAN)	1	0
S Cabrera (COL); P Rodríguez (COL)	1	2
U Castillejos (MEX); A Guzmán (MEX)	6	6
4	J Lu (CHN); R Tian (CHN)	0	7	[10]
B Gumulya (INA); J Rompies (INA)	6	5	[7]
D Linarez (VEN); D Sáez (VEN)	1	0
E Hayashi (JPN); A Yoshitomi (JPN)	6	6

Quarterfinals
1	C-y Hsu (TPE); Y-h Lee (TPE)	6	6
U Castillejos (MEX); A Guzmán (MEX)	2	1
4	J Lu (CHN); R Tian (CHN)	6	3	[8]
E Hayashi (JPN); A Yoshitomi (JPN)	3	6	[10]

Semifinals
1	C-y Hsu (TPE); Y-h Lee (TPE)	6	6
E Hayashi (JPN); A Yoshitomi (JPN)	3	0

=== Bottom half ===
First round
KA Jabines (PHI); MC Laureta (PHI)	0	1
J Altansarnai (MGL); E Erdenebat (MGL)	6	6
D Mukasa (UGA); R Ntembe (UGA)
D Borthwick (GBR); A Walker (GBR)	w/o
7	L Marozava (BLR); V Mun (BLR)	7	6
E Rutarová (CZE); D Šumová (CZE)	5	4
J Jegiołka (POL); S Mikołajczuk (POL)	6	2	[10]
M Jespersen (DEN); M Grage (DEN)	2	6	[7]
J Noordin (MAS); T Selvarajoo (MAS)	6	6
C San Martín (ARG); L Soulie (ARG)	3	1

Second round
5	N-l Han (KOR); S-r Lee (KOR)	6	6
J Altansarnai (MGL); E Erdenebat (MGL)	0	0
D Borthwick (GBR); A Walker (GBR)	2	6	[2]
3	V Kudermetova (RUS); K Lykina (RUS)	6	2	[10]
7	L Marozava (BLR); V Mun (BLR)	6	3	[5]
J Jegiołka (POL); S Mikołajczuk (POL)	4	6	[10]
J Noordin (MAS); T Selvarajoo (MAS)	3	0
2	N Lertcheewakarn (THA); V Wongteanchai (THA)	6	6

Quarterfinals
5	N-l Han (KOR); S-r Lee (KOR)	5	6	[10]
3	V Kudermetova (RUS); K Lykina (RUS)	7	2	[2]
J Jegiołka (POL); S Mikołajczuk (POL)	4	4
2	N Lertcheewakarn (THA); V Wongteanchai (THA)	6	6

Semifinals
5	N-l Han (KOR); S-r Lee (KOR)	6	6
2	N Lertcheewakarn (THA); V Wongteanchai (THA)	1	4
