= Tennis at the 2015 Summer Universiade – Women's singles =

Women's singles
- Tennis at the 2015 Summer Universiade

Final
- Champion: Chang Kai-chen (TPE)
- Runner-up: Luksika Kumkhum (THA)
- Score: 6–1, 6–2

Events
Singles	men	women
Doubles	men	women	mixed
Team	men	women
← 2013 ·	Summer Universiade	· 2017 →

The women's singles tennis event at the 2015 Summer Universiade was held from July 4 to 12 at the Jawol International Tennis Court in Gwangju, South Korea.

Chang Kai-chen of Chinese Taipei won the gold medal, defeating Luksika Kumkhum of Thailand in the final, 6–1, 6–2.

Beatrice Gumulya of Indonesia and Varatchaya Wongteanchai of Thailand won the bronze medals.

== Seeds ==
The top three seeds receive a bye into the second round.

1. Luksika Kumkhum (THA) (final; Silver medalist)
2. Chang Kai-chen (TPE) (champion; Gold medalist)
3. Sabina Sharipova (UZB) (third round)
4. Varatchaya Wongteanchai (THA) (semifinals; Bronze medalist)
5. Han Na-lae (KOR) (quarterfinals)
6. Jang Su-jeong (KOR) (second round)
7. Lu Jiajing (CHN) (third round)
8. Marta Sirotkina (RUS) (second round)
9. Justyna Jegiołka (POL) (third round)
10. Ksenia Lykina (RUS) (quarterfinals)
11. Lidziya Marozava (BLR) (second round)
12. Sun Xuliu (CHN) (second round)
13. Diana Šumová (CZE) (first round)
14. Alice Bacquié (FRA) (first round)
15. Wu Ho-ching (HKG) (third round)
16. Giuliana Olmos (MEX) (second round)

== Main draw ==
=== Key ===
- Q = Qualifier
- WC = Wild card
- LL = Lucky loser
- Alt = Alternate
- ITF = ITF entry
- PR = Protected ranking
- SR = Special ranking
- SE = Special exempt
- JE = Junior exempt
- JR = Junior Accelerator Programme entrant
- CO = College Accelerator Programme entrant
- NG = Next Gen Accelerator Program entrant
- w/o = Walkover
- r = Retired
- d = Defaulted

=== Finals ===
Quarterfinals
1	Luksika Kumkhum (THA)	6	6
Eva Rutarová (CZE)	4	2
Beatrice Gumulya (INA)	0	6	6
5	Han Na-lae (KOR)	6	3	3
Aiko Yoshitomi (JPN)	6	2	1
4	Varatchaya Wongteanchai (THA)	4	6	6
10	Ksenia Lykina (RUS)	5	3
2	Chang Kai-chen (TPE)	7	6

Semifinals
1	Luksika Kumkhum (THA)	0	6	6
Beatrice Gumulya (INA)	6	2	3
4	Varatchaya Wongteanchai (THA)	6	1	4
2	Chang Kai-chen (TPE)	4	6	6

Final
1	Luksika Kumkhum (THA)	1	2
2	Chang Kai-chen (TPE)	6	6

=== Top half ===
==== Section 1 ====
First round
K Ip (HKG)	6	6
M Himashi (SRI)	0	0
J Zaylah (LIB)	0	0
P Rodríguez (COL)	6	6
E Repic (CAN)	6	6
14	A Bacquié (FRA)	4	4
11	L Marozava (BLR)	6	6
S-y Hsieh (TPE)	4	3
S Mikołajczuk (POL)	4	2
E Rutarová (CZE)	6	6
M Miyaji (JPN)	6	6
S Moundir (SUI)	1	1
I Savage (SLE)
8	M Sirotkina (RUS)	w/o

Second round
1	L Kumkhum (THA)	6	6
K Ip (HKG)	2	1
P Rodríguez (COL)	1	0
E Repic (CAN)	6	6
11	L Marozava (BLR)	1	2
E Rutarová (CZE)	6	6
M Miyaji (JPN)	6	6
8	M Sirotkina (RUS)	3	1

Third round
1	L Kumkhum (THA)	6	6
E Repic (CAN)	2	1
E Rutarová (CZE)	7	6
M Miyaji (JPN)	5	4

Quarterfinals
1	L Kumkhum (THA)	6	6
E Rutarová (CZE)	4	2

==== Section 2 ====
First round
J Altansarnai (MGL)	w/o
D Mukasa (UGA)
A Mekel Nakahal (VEN)	2	0
B Gumulya (INA)	6	6
O Nicholls (GBR)	4	6	3
16	G Olmos (MEX)	6	1	6
12	X Sun (CHN)	5	6	6
M Jespersen (DEN)	7	0	3
N Banks (AIA)	0	0
C Van Nguyen (USA)	6	6
C San Martín (ARG)	w/o
M Mammetgulyyeva (TKM)
J Noordin (MAS)	2	3
5	N-l Han (KOR)	6	6

Second round
3	S Sharipova (UZB)	6	6
J Altansarnai (MGL)	1	2
B Gumulya (INA)	2	6	7
16	G Olmos (MEX)	6	2	5
12	X Sun (CHN)	3	4
C Van Nguyen (USA)	6	6
CN San Martín (ARG)	0	0
5	N-l Han (KOR)	6	6

Third round
3	S Sharipova (UZB)	3	6	2
B Gumulya (INA)	6	1	6
C Van Nguyen (USA)	4	2
5	N-l Han (KOR)	6	6

Quarterfinals
B Gumulya (INA)	0	6	6
5	N-l Han (KOR)	6	3	3

=== Bottom half ===
==== Section 3 ====
First round
6	S-j Jang (KOR)	6	6
B Ata El Khoury (LIB)	0	0
A Yoshitomi (JPN)	6	6
H Mediana (INA)	1	4
L Kwong (CAN)	w/o
J Hatamleh (JOR)
A Balderas (MEX)	1	1
9	J Jegiołka (POL)	6	6
15	H-c Wu (HKG)	6	6
A Seneviratne (SRI)	0	0
AIL French (SLE)
S Cabrera (COL)	w/o
V Mun (BLR)	6	6
P Baral (NEP)	0	0
ME Guillermo (PHI)	0	1
4	V Wongteanchai (THA)	6	6

Second round
6	S-j Jang (KOR)	6^{4}	6^{4}
A Yoshitomi (JPN)	7^{7}	7^{7}
L Kwong (CAN)	3	2
9	J Jegiołka (POL)	6	6
15	H-c Wu (HKG)	6	6
S Cabrera (COL)	1	1
V Mun (BLR)	2	0
4	V Wongteanchai (THA)	6	6

Third round
A Yoshitomi (JPN)	6	4	6
9	J Jegiołka (POL)	2	6	4
15	H-c Wu (HKG)	2	0
4	V Wongteanchai (THA)	6	6

Quarterfinals
A Yoshitomi (JPN)	6	2	1
4	V Wongteanchai (THA)	4	6	6

==== Section 4 ====
First round
7	J Lu (CHN)	6	7^{7}
M Grage (DEN)	2	6^{4}
D Linares (VEN)	2	2
D Borthwick (GBR)	6	6
K Ray (USA)	6	6
R Ntembe (UGA)	0	0
A Prenko (TKM)
10	K Lykina (RUS)	w/o
13	D Šumová (CZE)	0	7^{7}	4
C Ghesquière (FRA)	6	6^{4}	6
L Soulie (ARG)	1	4
P Merenkova (UZB)	6	6
E Erdenebat (MGL)	2	4
T Selvarajoo (MAS)	6	6

Second round
7	J Lu (CHN)	6^{4}	6	6
D Borthwick (GBR)	7^{7}	3	3
K Ray (USA)	0	2
10	K Lykina (RUS)	6	6
C Ghesquière (FRA)	6	6
P Merenkova (UZB)	1	3
T Selvarajoo (MAS)	0	0
2	K-c Chang (TPE)	6	6

Third round
7	J Lu (CHN)	1	1
10	K Lykina (RUS)	6	6
C Ghesquière (FRA)	2	6	0
2	K-c Chang (TPE)	6	4	6

Quarterfinals
10	K Lykina (RUS)	5	3
2	K-c Chang (TPE)	7	6

== Consolation draw ==
=== Key ===
- Q = Qualifier
- WC = Wild card
- LL = Lucky loser
- Alt = Alternate
- ITF = ITF entry
- PR = Protected ranking
- SR = Special ranking
- SE = Special exempt
- JE = Junior exempt
- JR = Junior Accelerator Programme entrant
- CO = College Accelerator Programme entrant
- NG = Next Gen Accelerator Program entrant
- w/o = Walkover
- r = Retired
- d = Defaulted

=== Consolation finals ===
Semifinals
13	Diana Šumová (CZE)	6^{5}	6	[10]
Mai Grage (DEN)	7^{7}	3	[5]
Megumi Nishimoto (JPN)	3	6^{7}
14	Alice Bacquié (FRA)	6	7^{9}

Final
13	Diana Šumová (CZE)	6^{1}	6	[7]
14	Alice Bacquié (FRA)	7^{7}	3	[10]

=== Top half ===
First round
D Linarez (VEN)	2	2
U Castillejos (MEX)	6	6
N Banks (AIA)	0	3
L Soulie (ARG)	6	6
O Nicholls (GBR)	6	6
A Guzmán (MEX)	0	4

Second round
13	D Šumová (CZE)	6	7
U Castillejos (MEX)	0	5
B Ata El Khoury (LIB)	0	0
Y Sul (KOR)	6	6
M Grage (DEN)	6	6
L Soulie (ARG)	0	0
O Nicholls (GBR)	4	6	[8]
M Noël (FRA)	6	3	[10]

Quarterfinals
13	D Šumová (CZE)	7	6
Y Sul (KOR)	5	4
M Grage (DEN)	6	6
M Noël (FRA)	1	0

Semifinals
13	D Šumová (CZE)	6^{5}	6	[10]
M Grage (DEN)	7^{7}	3	[5]

=== Bottom half ===
First round
D Sáez (VEN)	6	6
A Balderas (MEX)	2	3
M Jespersen (DEN)	3	6	[10]
J Cheng (CAN)	6	3	[12]

Second round
J Zaylah (LIB)	2	2
R Ntembe (UGA)	6	6
D Sáez (VEN)	4	2
M Nishimoto (JPN)	6	6
A Mekel Nakahal (VEN)	7	3	[10]
C San Martín (ARG)	5	6	[4]
J Cheng (CAN)	2	2
14	A Bacquié (FRA)	6	6

Quarterfinals
R Ntembe (UGA)	0	0
M Nishimoto (JPN)	6	6
A Mekel Nakahal (VEN)	1	3
14	A Bacquié (FRA)	6	6

Semifinals
M Nishimoto (JPN)	3	6^{7}
14	A Bacquié (FRA)	6	7^{9}
