= Tennis at the 2015 Summer Universiade – Mixed doubles =

Mixed doubles
- Tennis at the 2015 Summer Universiade

Final
- Champions: Lidziya Marozava (BLR); Andrei Vasilevski (BLR)
- Runners-up: Alexandra Walker (GBR); Darren Walsh (GBR)
- Score: 6–2, 6–3

Events
| Singles | men | women |
| Doubles | men | women | mixed |
| Team | men | women |
| ← 2013 · | Summer Universiade | · 2017 → |

The mixed doubles tennis event at the 2015 Summer Universiade was held from July 7 to 12 at the Jawol International Tennis Court in Gwangju, South Korea.

Lidziya Marozava and Andrei Vasilevski of Belarus won the gold medal, defeating Alexandra Walker and Darren Walsh of Great Britain in the final, 6–2, 6–3.

Chang Kai-chen and Peng Hsien-yin of Chinese Taipei and Veronika Kudermetova and Aslan Karatsev of Russia won the bronze medals.

== Seeds ==
The top five seeds receive a bye into the second round.

1. Chang Kai-chen / Peng Hsien-yin (TPE) (semifinals; Bronze medalists)
2. Lidziya Marozava / Andrei Vasilevski (BLR) (champion; Gold medalists)
3. Veronika Kudermetova / Aslan Karatsev (RUS) (semifinals; Bronze medalists)
4. Justyna Jegiołka / Maciej Smoła (POL) (quarterfinals)
5. Polina Merenkova / Shonigmatjon Shofayziev (UZB) (quarterfinals)
6. Jang Su-jeong / Chung Hong (KOR) (quarterfinals)
7. Céline Ghesquière / Antoine Hoang (FRA) (first round)
8. Eva Rutarová / Filip Doležel (CZE) (first round)

== Draw ==
=== Key ===
- Q = Qualifier
- WC = Wild card
- LL = Lucky loser
- Alt = Alternate
- ITF = ITF entry
- PR = Protected ranking
- SR = Special ranking
- SE = Special exempt
- JE = Junior exempt
- JR = Junior Accelerator Programme entrant
- CO = College Accelerator Programme entrant
- NG = Next Gen Accelerator Program entrant
- w/o = Walkover
- r = Retired
- d = Defaulted

=== Finals ===
Semifinals
1 | Chang Kai-chen (TPE); Peng Hsien-yin (TPE) | 3 | 6 | [6]
Alexandra Walker (GBR); Darren Walsh (GBR) | 6 | 3 | [10]
3 | Veronika Kudermetova (RUS); Aslan Karatsev (RUS) | 6 | 6^{2} | [18]
2 | Lidziya Marozava (BLR); Andrei Vasilevski (BLR) | 3 | 7^{7} | [20]

Final
Alexandra Walker (GBR); Darren Walsh (GBR) | 2 | 3
2 | Lidziya Marozava (BLR); Andrei Vasilevski (BLR) | 6 | 6

=== Top half ===
First round
J Cheng (CAN); A Day (CAN) | w/o
J Hatamleh (JOR); A Taifour (JOR)
C Van Nguyen (USA); M Redlicki (USA) | 6 | 6
S Samarasinghe (SRI); K Wickremaratne (SRI) | 0 | 0
B Ata El Khoury (LIB); M El Tannir (LIB) | 0 | 1
S Moundir (SUI); R Hemmeler (SUI) | 6 | 6
D Sáez (VEN); J Figueroa (VEN) | 4 | 2
A Walker (GBR); D Walsh (GBR) | 6 | 6
J Rompies (INA); NA Iswan (INA) | 6 | 4 | [11]
7 | C Ghesquière (FRA); A Hoang (FRA) | 4 | 6 | [9]

Second round
1 | K-c Chang (TPE); H-y Peng (TPE) | 7^{7} | 7
JH Cheng (CAN); A Day (CAN) | 6^{0} | 5
C Van Nguyen (USA); M Redlicki (USA) | 5 | 5
5 | P Merenkova (UZB); S Shofayziev (UZB) | 7 | 7
4 | J Jegiołka (POL); M Smoła (POL) | 6 | 6
S Moundir (SUI); R Hemmeler (SUI) | 1 | 2
A Walker (GBR); D Walsh (GBR) | 6 | 6
J Rompies (INA); NA Iswan (INA) | 2 | 3

Quarterfinals
1 | K-c Chang (TPE); H-y Peng (TPE) | 6^{1} | 6 | [10]
5 | P Merenkova (UZB); S Shofayziev (UZB) | 7^{7} | 2 | [8]
4 | J Jegiołka (POL); M Smoła (POL) | 6^{4} | 6 | [5]
A Walker (GBR); D Walsh (GBR) | 7^{7} | 1 | [10]

Semifinals
1 | K-c Chang (TPE); H-y Peng (TPE)
A Walker (GBR); D Walsh (GBR)

=== Bottom half ===
First round
8 | E Rutarová (CZE); F Doležel (CZE) | 6 | 6^{2} | [7]
R Tian (CHN); Y Du (CHN) | 2 | 7^{7} | [10]
C San Martín (ARG); A Vampa (ARG) | 6 | 6
O Baasan (MGL); O Tsogt (MGL) | 2 | 3
P Rodríguez (COL); S López (COL) | 2 | 2
E Chong (HKG); P-l Yeung (HKG) | 6 | 6
6 | S-j Jang (KOR); H Chung (KOR) | 6 | 6
J Noordin (MAS); S Syed Naguib (MAS) | 2 | 4
M Nishimoto (JPN); D Kondo (JPN) | 4 | 6 | [6]
G Olmos (MEX); MA Núñez (MEX) | 6 | 3 | [10]
A Prenko (TKM); A Ernepesov (TKM)
N Lertcheewakarn (THA); P Burapharittha (THA) | w/o

Second round
R Tian (CHN); Y Du (CHN) | 6 | 6
C San Martín (ARG); A Vampa (ARG) | 0 | 2
E Chong (HKG); P-l Yeung (HKG) | 6^{2} | 2
3 | V Kudermetova (RUS); A Karatsev (RUS) | 7^{7} | 6
6 | S-j Jang (KOR); H Chung (KOR) | 4 | 6 | [10]
G Olmos (MEX); MA Núñez (MEX) | 6 | 4 | [8]
N Lertcheewakarn (THA); P Burapharittha (THA) | 4 | 5
2 | L Marozava (BLR); A Vasilevski (BLR) | 6 | 7

Quarterfinals
R Tian (CHN); Y Du (CHN) | 4 | 4
3 | V Kudermetova (RUS); A Karatsev (RUS) | 6 | 6
6 | S-j Jang (KOR); H Chung (KOR) | 1 | 6 | [7]
2 | L Marozava (BLR); A Vasilevski (BLR) | 6 | 3 | [10]

Semifinals
3 | V Kudermetova (RUS); A Karatsev (RUS) | 6 | 6^{2} | [18]
2 | L Marozava (BLR); A Vasilevski (BLR) | 3 | 7^{7} | [20]
