= Fencing at the 2015 Summer Universiade – Women's individual épée =

Women's épée at the 2015 Summer Universiade
- Venue: Kim Dae-Jung Convention Center
- Date: July 5, 2015
- Competitors: 71 from 29 nations

The women's épée fencing competition at the 2015 Summer Universiade in Gwangju was held on 4 July 2015 at the Kim Dae-Jung Convention Center.

== Results ==
=== Preliminaries ===
==== Pool 1 ====
Athletes	Pld	W	Ind	TG	TR	Diff
Dzhoan Feybi Bezhura (UKR)	6	5	0.833	27	12	+16
Ida Finizio (ITA)	6	5	0.833	24	15	+9
Chu Ka Mong (HKG)	6	4	0.667	25	17	+8
Shao Wenxue (CHN)	6	4	0.667	25	23	+2
Ha Ji-young (KOR)	6	2	0.333	22	26	-4
Victoria Ann Xiu (SIN)	6	1	0.167	17	29	-12
Anudari Otgonmunkh (MGL)	6	0	0.000	12	30	-18

==== Pool 2 ====
Athletes	Pld	W	Ind	TG	TR	Diff
Xu Chengzi (CHN)	6	6	1.000	28	11	+17
Danielle Alexandra Henderson (USA)	6	5	0.833	25	11	+14
Lizze Carolina Asis Escalona (VEN)	6	3	0.500	18	16	+2
Lilit Evoyan (ARM)	6	3	0.500	19	18	+1
Ho Cheuk Suen Circle (HKG)	6	3	0.500	22	25	-3
Tsolmon Batkhuu (MGL)	6	1	0.167	15	29	-14
Nicolette Junyi Soh (SIN)	6	0	0.000	11	28	-17

==== Pool 3 ====
Athletes	Pld	W	Ind	TG	TR	Diff
Jang Seo-yeon (KOR)	6	6	1.000	3	9	+6
Iullia Lichagina (RUS)	6	5	0.833	25	9	+16
Anu Hark (EST)	6	3	0.500	21	16	+5
Paula Schmidl (AUT)	6	3	0.500	22	20	+2
Malika Khakinova (UZB)	6	3	0.500	19	19	0
Khaliunaa Ganbold (MGL)	6	1	0.167	6	28	-22
Rakhi Sharma (NEP)	6	0	0.000	8	30	-22

==== Pool 4 ====
Athletes	Pld	W	Ind	TG	TR	Diff
Avital Marinuk (ISR)	6	6	1.000	30	18	+12
Nelli Paju (EST)	6	5	0.833	29	17	+12
Jessie Malani Radanovich (USA)	6	4	0.667	27	17	+10
Shiori Komata (JPN)	6	3	0.500	23	24	-1
Lin Huimin (TPE)	6	2	0.333	23	22	+1
Jannica Elisabeth Vestergård (SWE)	6	1	0.167	12	29	-17
Gereimaa Baatarchulun (MGL)	6	0	0.000	13	30	-17

==== Pool 5 ====
Athletes	Pld	W	Ind	TG	TR	Diff
Song Sera (KOR)	6	4	0.667	26	14	+12
Anna Klara Kolczonay (HUN)	6	4	0.667	27	24	+3
Kseniya Pantelyeyeva (UKR)	6	4	0.667	24	21	+3
Alena Komarova (RUS)	6	4	0.667	28	26	+2
Magdalena Pawłowska (POL)	6	3	0.500	23	26	-3
Kanna Oishi (JPN)	6	1	0.167	21	29	-8
Coco Lin (HKG)	6	1	0.167	20	29	-9

==== Pool 6 ====
Athletes	Pld	W	Ind	TG	TR	Diff
Nickol Tal (ISR)	6	6	1.000	30	15	+15
Barbara Maria Rutz (POL)	6	4	0.667	27	19	+8
Inna Brovko (UKR)	6	4	0.667	21	17	+4
Hsu Jo Ting (TPE)	6	3	0.500	24	22	+2
Emma Josephine Väggö (SWE)	6	3	0.500	25	25	0
Nina Malan van Loon (USA)	6	1	0.167	16	26	-10
Laura Simon (MAS)	6	0	0.000	11	30	-19

==== Pool 7 ====
Athletes	Pld	W	Ind	TG	TR	Diff
Nicol Foietta (ITA)	6	6	1.000	28	14	+14
Lee Sol (KOR)	6	4	0.667	25	23	+2
Kamila Nadia Pytka (POL)	6	4	0.667	19	17	+2
Kata Mihály (HUN)	6	3	0.500	21	20	+1
Amelie Jeannette Awong Mvele (FRA)	6	2	0.333	22	23	-1
Louise Fournier (CAN)	6	2	0.333	19	20	-1
Cheng Ya Fang (TPE)	6	0	0.000	13	30	-17

==== Pool 8 ====
Athletes	Pld	W	Ind	TG	TR	Diff
Viktoriia Kuzmenkova (RUS)	6	4	0.667	27	20	+7
Ines Parreira Cruz Herminio (POR)	6	4	0.667	21	14	+7
Xiang Yixuan (CHN)	6	4	0.667	22	18	+4
Giorgia Pometti (ITA)	6	4	0.667	22	19	+3
Amanda Elizabeth Sirico (USA)	6	3	0.500	23	21	+2
Helene Marie Juana Ngom (FRA)	6	2	0.333	24	27	-3
Naira Sathiyo Ferreira Silva (BRA)	6	0	0.000	10	30	-20

==== Pool 9 ====
Athletes	Pld	W	Ind	TG	TR	Diff
Luisa Tesserin (ITA)	6	5	0.833	25	15	+10
Josephine Marie Andre Coquine (FRA)	6	4	0.667	27	16	+11
Jagoda Bożena Zagała (POL)	6	4	0.667	27	21	+6
Yulia Svystil (UKR)	6	4	0.667	26	22	+4
Amy Madison Raynolds (AUS)	6	3	0.500	22	23	-1
Yume Kuroki (JPN)	6	1	0.167	17	26	-9
Djeneba Sidibe (MLI)	6	0	0.000	9	30	-21

==== Pool 10 ====
Athletes	Pld	W	Ind	TG	TR	Diff
Dimodi Laurence Epée (FRA)	5	4	0.800	22	17	+5
Elena Shasharina (RUS)	5	3	0.600	20	18	+2
Alexandra Dalma Bossányi-Jung (HUN)	5	3	0.600	18	16	+2
Polina Melentiev (ISR)	5	2	0.400	20	19	+1
Veronika Zuikova (EST)	5	2	0.400	20	20	0
Cecilia Emma Sophie Wenne (SWE)	5	1	0.200	11	21	-10
