= Judo at the 2015 Summer Universiade – Men's light heavyweight =

Judo competition

Judo Men's 100 kg at the 2015 Summer Universiade
- Venue: Yeomju Bitgoeul Gymnasium
- Location: Gwangju, South Korea
- Date: 4 July 2015

Medalists
gold medal	Cho Gu-ham	South Korea
silver medal	Clément Delvert	France
bronze medal	Dino Pfeiffer	Germany
bronze medal	Niaz Bilalov	Russia

Competition at external databases
- Links: JudoInside

The men's light heavyweight competition Judo at the 2015 Summer Universiade in Gwangju was held on 5 July at the Yeomju Bitgoeul Gymnasium.

== Schedule ==
All times are Korea Standard Time (UTC+09:00)

Date	Time	Event
Saturday, 4 July 2015	09:00	Elimination round of 32
Saturday, 4 July 2015	10:00	Elimination round of 16
Saturday, 4 July 2015	11:00	Quarterfinals
Saturday, 4 July 2015	12:00	Semifinals
Saturday, 4 July 2015	13:00	Final of repechage
Saturday, 4 July 2015	17:00	Bronze medal contests
Saturday, 4 July 2015	18:00	Gold medal contest

== Results ==
=== Main bracket ===
==== Final ====
Gold medal contest
Cho Gu-ham (KOR)	000
Clement Delvert (FRA)	000

==== Top half ====
Elimination round of 32
Lkhagva-Ochir Begz (MGL)	000
Gotō Ryūtarō (JPN)	100
~~Nurali Yalkapov (TKM)~~
Vadims Lando (LAT)
La Smith (USA)	112
David Büchel (LIE)	000
Uulu Choro Turganbek (KGZ)	0
Tomasz Domanski (POL)	100
Salcedo Ronny Benzo (DOM)	0
Dmytro Luchyn (UKR)	100
Clement Delvert (FRA)	100
Dino Pfeiffer (GER)	000

Elimination round of 16
Gotō Ryūtarō (JPN)	102
Vadims Lando (LAT)	000
La Smith (USA)	000
Gabriel Souza (BRA)	100
~~Ibrahim Barrie (SLE)~~
Tomasz Domanski (POL)
Dmytro Luchyn (UKR)	000
Clement Delvert (FRA)	100

Quarterfinals
Gotō Ryūtarō (JPN)	000
Gabriel Souza (BRA)	000
Tomasz Domanski (POL)	100
Clement Delvert (FRA)	000

Semifinals
Gotō Ryūtarō (JPN)	000
Clement Delvert (FRA)	101

==== Bottom half ====
Elimination round of 32
Harvinder Singh (IND)	000
Oubaid Grine (ALG)	111
Karolis Bauža (LTU)	000
Niiaz Bilalov (RUS)	100
Grigori Minaškin (EST)	000
Viktor Demyanenko (KAZ)	011
~~Ufan Butt (PAK)~~
Tomáš Knápek (CZE)
Zhang Jun (CHN)	100
Isaac Bezzina (MLT)	000
~~Saidzhalol Saidov (TJK)~~
Fakhriddin Sharipov (UZB)

Elimination round of 16
Oubaid Grine (ALG)	000
Niiaz Bilalov (RUS)	100
Viktor Demyanenko (KAZ)	000
Cho Gu-ham (KOR)	100
Tomáš Knápek (CZE)	000
Danilo Pantić (MNE)	011
Zhang Jun (CHN)	001
Fakhriddin Sharipov (UZB)	000

Quarterfinals
Niiaz Bilalov (RUS)	000
Cho Gu-ham (KOR)	002
Danilo Pantić (MNE)	010
Zhang Jun (CHN)	100

Semifinals
Cho Gu-ham (KOR)	100
Zhang Jun (CHN)	000

=== Repechage ===
Repechage 1
Lkhagva-Ochir Begz (MGL)	110
Vadims Lando (LAT)	011
Dino Pfeiffer (GER)	101
Dmytro Luchyn (UKR)	000

Repechage 2
Lkhagva-Ochir Begz (MGL)	100
Gabriel Souza (BRA)	000
Dino Pfeiffer (GER)	100
Tomasz Domanski (POL)	000

Repechage 3
Gabriel Souza (BRA)	000
Dino Pfeiffer (GER)	1000

Bronze Medal
Dino Pfeiffer (GER)	000
Zhang Jun (CHN)	000

Repechage 1
Isaac Bezzina (MLT)	000
Fakhriddin Sharipov (UZB)	100

Repechage 2
Viktor Demyanenko (KAZ)	000
Niiaz Bilalov (RUS)	100
Fakhriddin Sharipov (UZB)	102
Danilo Pantić (MNE)	000

Repechage 3
Niiaz Bilalov (RUS)	100
Fakhriddin Sharipov (UZB)	000

Bronze Medal
Niiaz Bilalov (RUS)	000
Gotō Ryūtarō (JPN)	000
