= Diving at the 2015 Summer Universiade – Men's 3 metre springboard =

Men's 3 metre springboard at the 2015 Summer Universiade
- Venue: Nambu University International Aquatics Center
- Date: July 3, 2015 - July 4, 2015
- Competitors: 24 from 12 nations

Medalists
gold medal	Peng Jianfeng	China
silver medal	Evgenii Novoselov	Russia
bronze medal	Daniel Islas Arroyo	Mexico

The men's 3 metre springboard diving competition at the 2015 Summer Universiade in Gwangju was held on 3–4 July at the Nambu University International Aquatics Center.

== Schedule ==
All times are Korea Standard Time (UTC+09:00)

Date	Time	Event
Friday, 3 July 2015	12:15	Preliminary
Saturday, 4 July 2015	10:00	Semifinal
Saturday, 4 July 2015	14:45	Final

== Results ==
Rank	Athletes	Preliminary		Semi-final		Final
Rank	Athletes	Points	Rank	Points	Rank	Final
1st place, gold medalist(s)	Peng Jianfeng (CHN)	439.05	2	467	1	515.3
2nd place, silver medalist(s)	Evgenii Novoselov (RUS)	410.2	6	443.1	2	473.9
3rd place, bronze medalist(s)	Daniel Islas Arroyo (MEX)	423.25	5	386.9	5	441.85
4	Son Tae-lang (KOR)	372.25	11	383.4	8	408.1
5	Kim Yeong-nam (KOR)	338.25	18	427.3	4	406.65
6	Jack Haslam (GBR)	406.75	7	385.25	6	398.65
7	Viacheslav Novoselov (RUS)	439.5	1	436.2	3	397.3
8	Matthew Barnard (AUS)	378.5	9	384.5	7	381.65
9	Jouni Antero Kallunki (FIN)	375.4	10	377.25	9	364.85
10	Jack Nyquist (USA)	342.05	15	369.4	12	364
11	Jakob Kolod (USA)	344.1	14	375.7	10	358
12	Gabriele Auber (ITA)	367.75	12	370	11	324.2
13	Zhong Yuming (CHN)	435.9	3	365.25	13	
14	Oliver Armstrong-Scott (NZL)	324.4	19	344.8	14	
15	Otto Lehtonen (FIN)	340.35	17	335.2	15	
16	Adityo Restu Putra (INA)	319.55	20	333.3	16	
17	Andreas Nader Billi (ITA)	340.6	16	331.05	17	
18	Cameron McLean (CAN)	391.6	8	294.55	18	
19	Wang Zihao (CHN)	427.8	4			
20	Aleksandr Kandrashin (RUS)	351.85	13			
21	Kim Jin-yong (KOR)	319	21			
22	Bryce Klein (USA)	314.8	22			
23	Heikki Maekikallio (FIN)	289.45	23			
24	Rodrigo Diego López (MEX)	288.65	24			
