= Gymnastics at the 2015 Summer Universiade – Women's floor =

Women's floor at the 2015 Summer Universiade
- Venue: Gwangju Women's University Universiade Gymnasium
- Date: July 7, 2015
- Competitors: 8 from 6 nations

Medalists
| gold medal | Polina Fedorova | Russia |
| silver medal | Daria Elizarova | Russia |
| bronze medal | Kelly Simm | Great Britain |

The Women's floor Gymnastics at the 2015 Summer Universiade in Gwangju was held on 7 July at the Gwangju Women's University Universiade Gymnasium.

== Schedule ==
All times are Korea Standard Time (UTC+09:00)

| Date | Time | Event |
|---|---|---|
| Tuesday, 7 July 2015 | 17:05 | Final |

== Results ==
| Rank | Athlete | Score |
|---|---|---|
| 1st place, gold medalist(s) | Polina Fedorova (RUS) | 14.200 |
| 2nd place, silver medalist(s) | Daria Elizarova (RUS) | 14.133 |
| 3rd place, bronze medalist(s) | Kelly Simm (GBR) | 13.966 |
| 4 | Asuka Teramoto (JPN) | 13.533 |
| 5 | Natsumi Sasada (JPN) | 13.433 |
| 6 | Farah Ann Abdul Hadi (MAS) | 13.400 |
| 7 | Dilnoza Abdusalimova (UZB) | 13.266 |
| 8 | Ana Filipa Martins (POR) | 12.666 |
