= Gymnastics at the 2015 Summer Universiade – Women's uneven bars =

Athletic competition

Women's uneven bars at the 2015 Summer Universiade
- Venue: Gwangju Women's University Universiade Gymnasium
- Date: July 7, 2015
- Competitors: 8 from 6 nations

Medalists
gold medal	Ekaterina Kramarenko	Russia
silver medal	Asuka Teramoto	Japan
bronze medal	Maria Paseka	Russia

The Women's uneven bars Gymnastics at the 2015 Summer Universiade in Gwangju was held on 7 July at the Gwangju Women's University Universiade Gymnasium.

== Schedule ==
All times are Korea Standard Time (UTC+09:00)

Date	Time	Event
Tuesday, 7 July 2015	12:45	Final

== Results ==
Rank	Athlete	Score
1st place, gold medalist(s)	Ekaterina Kramarenko (RUS)	14.800
2nd place, silver medalist(s)	Asuka Teramoto (JPN)	14.233
3rd place, bronze medalist(s)	Maria Paseka (RUS)	14.100
4	Kelly Simm (GBR)	13.566
5	Ana Filipa Martins (POR)	13.566
6	Georgia-Rose Brown (AUS)	13.166
7	Heo Seon-mi (KOR)	13.000
8	Eum Da-yeon (KOR)	12.666
