= Gymnastics at the 2015 Summer Universiade – Women's vault =

Women's vault at the 2015 Summer Universiade
- Venue: Gwangju Women's University Universiade Gymnasium
- Date: July 7, 2015
- Competitors: 8 from 6 nations

Medalists
gold medal	Maria Paseka	Russia
silver medal	Kelly Simm	Great Britain
bronze medal	Daria Elizarova	Russia

The Women's vault Gymnastics at the 2015 Summer Universiade in Gwangju was held on 7 July at the Gwangju Women's University Universiade Gymnasium.

== Schedule ==
All times are Korea Standard Time (UTC+09:00)

Date	Time	Event
Tuesday, 7 July 2015	11:30	Final

== Results ==
Rank	Athlete	Vault 1	Vault 2	Total
1st place, gold medalist(s)	Maria Paseka (RUS)	15.400	14.100	14.750
2nd place, silver medalist(s)	Kelly Simm (GBR)	14.533	13.933	14.233
3rd place, bronze medalist(s)	Daria Elizarova (RUS)	14.100	13.900	14.000
4	Tan Ing Yueh (MAS)	13.575	13.700	13.637
5	Farah Ann Abdul Hadi (MAS)	13.866	13.233	13.549
6	Simone Penker (AUT)	13.133	12.700	12.916
7	Dilnoza Abdusalimova (UZB)	13.500	12.133	12.816
8	Mariana Vazquez (MEX)	13.800	0.000	6.900
