= Diving at the 2015 Summer Universiade – Men's synchronized 3 metre springboard =

Men's synchronized 3 m springboard at the 2015 Summer Universiade
- Venue: Nambu University International Aquatics Center
- Date: July 5, 2015
- Competitors: 24 from 12 nations

Medalists
gold medal	Viacheslav Novoselov; Evgenii Novoselov	Russia
silver medal	Li Yanan; Zhong Yuming	China
bronze medal	Kim Yeong-Nam; Son Ta-Elang	South Korea

The Men's synchronized 3 metre springboard diving competition at the 2015 Summer Universiade in Gwangju was held on 5 July at the Nambu University International Aquatics Center.

== Schedule ==
All times are Korea Standard Time (UTC+09:00)

Date	Time	Event
Sunday, 5 July 2015	14:45	Final

== Results ==
Rank	Team	Dive						Total
Rank	Team	1	2	3	4	5	6	Total
1st place, gold medalist(s)	Russia (RUS); Viacheslav Novoselov; Evgenii Novoselov	54	49.2	76.5	71.4	81.84	61.56	394.5
2nd place, silver medalist(s)	China (CHN); Li Yanan; Zhong Yuming	52.2	45.6	69.75	80.58	72.9	67.32	388.35
3rd place, bronze medalist(s)	South Korea (KOR); Kim Yeong-Nam; Son Ta-Elang	49.8	47.4	71.1	68.82	72.9	71.4	381.42
4	Mexico (MEX); Daniel Islas Arroyo; Rodrigo Diego Lopez	49.8	48.6	63	75.48	70.68	70.38	377.94
5	Italy (ITA); Andreas Nader Billi; Gabriele Auber	46.2	48	69.75	59.4	63.24	63.9	350.49
6	United States (USA); Bradley Christensen; Bryce Klein	46.2	46.2	63.24	68.4	57.12	57.12	338.28
7	Finland (FIN); Jouni Antero Kallunki; Otto Lehtonen	45.6	45	46.8	64.17	61.2	59.4	322.17
8	Indonesia (INA); Adityo Restu Putra; Andriyan Andriyan	43.8	46.2	52.2	62.31	46.8	61.2	312.51
