= Diving at the 2015 Summer Universiade – Women's synchronized 10 metre platform =

Women's synchronized 10 metre platform at the 2015 Summer Universiade
- Venue: Nambu University International Aquatics Center
- Date: July 6, 2015
- Competitors: 10 from 5 nations

Medalists
gold medal	Celina Jayne Toth; Carol-Ann Ware	Canada
silver medal	Ko Eun-Ji; Moon Na-Yun	South Korea
bronze medal	Wang Han; Wang Ying	China

The Men's Women's synchronized 10 metre platform diving competition at the 2015 Summer Universiade in Gwangju was held on 6 July at the Nambu University International Aquatics Center.

== Schedule ==
All times are Korea Standard Time (UTC+09:00)

Date	Time	Event
Sunday, 6 July 2015	15:00	Final

== Results ==
Rank	Team	Dive					Total
Rank	Team	1	2	3	4	5	Total
1st place, gold medalist(s)	Canada (CAN); Celina Jayne Toth; Carol-Ann Ware	48.00	49.20	71.04	65.70	63.36	297.30
2nd place, silver medalist(s)	South Korea (KOR); Ko Eun-Ji; Moon Na-Yun	49.20	46.20	66.36	66.12	54.00	281.88
3rd place, bronze medalist(s)	China (CHN); Wang Han; Wang Ying	49.20	46.20	69.30	57.60	59.52	281.82
4	Mexico (MEX); Karla Elizabeth Rivas Gonzalez; Marisa Daniela Diaz Prieto	45.60	46.20	61.20	53.46	64.32	270.78
5	Russia (RUS); Anastasia Kozlova; Elina Ridel	45.60	50.40	45.60	61.77	51.33	254.70
