= Football at the 2015 Summer Universiade – Women's tournament =

Women's football at the XXVIII Summer Universiade
- Venue: various
- Dates: July 2, 2015 – July 12, 2015

The women's tournament of football at the 2015 Summer Universiade will be held from July 2 to 12 in Gwangju, South Korea.

== Teams ==
Africa	Americas	Asia	Europe
South Africa	Brazil; Canada; Colombia; Mexico; USA	South Korea (host); China; Japan; Chinese Taipei	Czech Republic; France; Ireland; Poland; Russia

== Preliminary round ==
=== Group A ===
Team	Pld	W	D	L	GF	GA	GD	Pts
South Korea	3	3	0	0	7	1	+6	9
Czech Republic	3	1	1	1	7	5	+2	4
Chinese Taipei	3	0	2	1	2	3	−1	2
Republic of Ireland	3	0	1	2	2	9	−7	1

2 July 2015
11:00

South Korea	3–1	Czech Republic
Kim Dam-bi 69'; Lee So-dam 88'; Jang Sel-gi 89'	Report	Ivanicova 41'

Naju Public Stadium, Naju
Referee: Francia Gonzalez Martinez (Mexico)
2 July 2015
11:00

Republic of Ireland	1–1	Chinese Taipei
O'Riordan 20'	Report	Pao Hsin-hsuan 36'

Mokpo International Football Center, Mokpo
Referee: Akhona Makalima (South Africa)

4 July 2015
16:30

South Korea	1–0	Chinese Taipei
Kim So-yi 40'	Report

Honam University Football Field
Referee: Pustovoytova Anastasia (Russia)
4 July 2015
16:30

Republic of Ireland	1–5	Czech Republic
O'Riordan 53'	Report	Chlastáková 13'; Matoušková 17', 89'; Necidová 44'; Malinová 51'

Boseong Public Stadium
Referee: Mai Hoàng Trang (Vietnam)

6 July 2015
16:30

South Korea	3–0	Republic of Ireland
Jang Sel-gi 62', 70'; Namgung Ye-ji 88'	Report

Naju Public Stadium
Referee: Akhona Makalima (South Africa)
6 July 2015
16:30

Chinese Taipei	1–1	Czech Republic
Tsou 23'	Report	Benýrová 74'

Mokpo International Football Center, Mokpo
Referee: Karolina Radzik-Johan (Poland)

=== Group B ===
Team	Pld	W	D	L	GF	GA	GD	Pts
Japan	3	2	1	0	16	0	+16	7
Russia	3	2	1	0	11	0	+11	7
Mexico	3	1	0	2	9	5	+4	3
Colombia	3	0	0	3	0	31	−31	0

2 July 2015
16:30

Mexico	9–0	Colombia
Ferral Montalvan 5', 89'; Monsivais Salayandi 15', 28', 43'; Mercado Fuentes 41'; Garza Rodriguez 79', 90+2'; Pontigo Carmona 88'	Report

Naju Public Stadium
Referee: Karolina Radzik-Johan (Poland)
2 July 2015
16:30

Japan	0–0	Russia
	Report

Mokpo Main International Football Center
Referee: Akhona Makalima (South Africa)

4 July 2015
11:00

Mexico	0–3	Russia
	Report	Kozhnikova 44'; Cholovyaga 55'; Terekhova 84'

Honam University Football Field
Referee: Maria Piedade Rebello (India)
4 July 2015
11:00

Japan	14–0	Colombia
Honda 6', 41', 43'; Hamamoto 10', 35', 55'; Kaga 18', 33'; Sunaga 28'; Takahashi 38', 90+2'; Yokoyama 46', 71' (pen.), 90+1' (pen.)	Report

Boseong Public Stadium
Referee: Esther Azzopardi (Ireland)

6 July 2015
11:00

Mexico	0–2	Japan
	Report	Mana Mihashi 15'; Anna Yamamori 79'

Naju Public Stadium
Referee: Olga Zadinová (Czech Republic)
6 July 2015
11:00

Russia	8–0	Colombia
	Report

Mokpo Main International Football Center
Referee: Jung Ji-young (South Korea)

=== Group C ===
Team	Pld	W	D	L	GF	GA	GD	Pts
Brazil	2	2	0	0	6	0	+6	6
China	2	1	0	1	4	4	0	3
Poland	2	0	0	2	1	7	−6	0
North Korea (W)	0	0	0	0	0	0	0	0

(W) Withdrew
2 July 2015
16:30

China	4–1	Poland
Li Wen 45+1'; Zhao Rong 62'; Ma Xiaoxu 73'; Lyu Yueyun 81'	Report	Kaletka 18'

Boseong Public Stadium
Referee: Olga Zadinová (Czech Republic)

4 July 2015
11:00

Brazil	3–0	Poland
De Jesus Camargo Derrico 20'; Moretti 75'; Paulino Cardozo 80'	Report

Naju Public Stadium
Referee: Jung Ji-young (South Korea)

6 July 2015
11:00

Brazil	3–0	China
Thais Duarte Guedes 42', 81'; Pereira da Cruz 58'	Report

Honam University Football Field
Referee: Anna Sidorova (Uzbekistan)

=== Group D ===
Team	Pld	W	D	L	GF	GA	GD	Pts
Canada	3	3	0	0	6	0	+6	9
France	3	2	0	1	8	2	+6	6
United States	3	1	0	2	1	7	−6	3
South Africa	3	0	0	3	0	6	−6	0

2 July 2015
11:00

South Africa	0–1	United States
	Report	Milliet 34'

Honam University Football Field, Hanam
Referee: Jung Ji-young (South Korea)
2 July 2015
11:00

France	0–2	Canada
	Report	Gosselin 38'; Lund 87'

Boseong Public Stadium, Boseong
Referee: Yoshimi Yamashita (Japan)

4 July 2015
16:30

South Africa	0–2	Canada
	Report	Candlish 15'; Lagarde 60'

Naju Public Stadium
Referee: Lee Yi-chi (Chinese Taipei)
4 July 2015
16:30

France	5–0	United States
Gauvin 1', 25', 51', 89'; Bourgoin 10'	Report

Mokpo Football Center
Referee: Li Juan (China)

6 July 2015
16:30

South Africa	0–3	France
	Report	Lavaud 16'; Le Bihan 52'; Gauvin 54' (pen.)

Honam University Football Field
Referee: Martinez Gonzalez (Mexico)
6 July 2015
16:30

Canada	2–0	United States
Lund 65', 82'	Report

Boseong Public Stadium, Boseong
Referee: A. Pustovoytova (Russia)

== Classification round ==
Quarterfinals
Chinese Taipei	3
South Africa	0
Mexico
Poland	5
Colombia	1
United States	1
Republic of Ireland	0

Semifinals
Chinese Taipei	2
B3	Mexico	3
United States	1
Poland	2

Gold Medal Match
Mexico
Poland
Bronze Medal Match
Chinese Taipei
United States

=== Quarterfinal round ===
==== 9th–16th place ====
8 July 2015

Chinese Taipei	3–0	South Africa

8 July 2015

Poland	5–1	Colombia

8 July 2015

United States	1–0	Republic of Ireland

=== Semifinal round ===
==== 13th–16th place ====
10 July 2015

Republic of Ireland	8–0	Colombia

==== 9th–12th place ====
10 July 2015

United States	1–2	Poland

10 July 2015

Mexico	3–2	Chinese Taipei

== Elimination round ==
Quarterfinals
C1	Brazil	0
B2	Russia	1
D1	Canada	2
A2	Czech Republic	1
B1	Japan	0 (3)
C2	China	0 (1)
A1	South Korea	0
D2	France	2

Semifinals
Russia	4
Canada	0
Japan	1 (6)
France	1 (7)

Gold Medal Match
Russia	0
France	2
Bronze Medal Match
Japan	5
Canada	0

=== Quarterfinals ===
8 July 2015
16:30

Japan	0–0 (3–1)	China

8 July 2015
16:30

Brazil	0–1	Russia
	Report	Chernomyrdina 46'

Mokpo International Football Center, Mokpo
Referee: Yi-chi Lee (Chinese Taipei)
8 July 2015
16:30

South Korea	0–2	France

8 July 2015
16:30

Canada	2–1	Czech Republic
Roy 51' (pen.); Gosselin 55'	Report	Svitková 90+3'

Boseong Public Stadium
Referee: Mai hoang Trang (Vietnam)

=== Semifinals ===
==== 5th–8th place ====
10 July 2015

Czech Republic	0–1	Brazil
	Report	Duarte Guedes 34'

Mokpo International Football Center, Mokpo
Referee: Yoshimi Yamashita (Japan)
10 July 2015

China	2–1	South Korea

==== 1st–4th place ====
10 July 2015
11:00

Canada	0–4	Russia
	Report	Pantiukhina 32'; Terekhova 56', 65'; Cholovyaga 77'

Naju Public Stadium
Referee: Li Juan (People's Republic of China)
10 July 2015

Japan	1–1(6–7)	France

== Final round ==
All of the following matches will be held on July 13, 2015. Only the gold medal match will need 30 minutes extra time if two teams draw. Other matches will go directly to penalty shoot-outs if the two teams tie.

=== 13th place match ===
12 July 2015
11:00

Republic of Ireland	3–3	South Africa
Maguire 64', 82' (pen.); Hansberry 90+4'	Report	Dlamini 38'; Jane 57', 78'
Penalties
Cronin (penalty scored); Maguire (penalty scored); Graham (penalty scored); Grant (penalty scored)	4–2	Mogolola (penalty scored); Thato (penalty missed); Biyana (penalty scored); Twayise (penalty missed)

Mokpo International Football Center Secondly Stadium
Referee: Lee Yi-chi (Chinese Taipei)

=== 11th place match ===
12 July 2015
11:00

Chinese Taipei	3–2	United States
Chan Pi-han 21'; Tsou Hsin-ni 50'; Yu Hsiu-chin 82' (pen.)	Report	Ayers 7'; Schweiss 67'

Honam University Football Field
Referee: Mai Hoàng Trang (Vietnam)

=== 9th place match ===
12 July 2015
16:30

Mexico	4–1	Poland
Monsiváis 42', 82'; Gallegos 73', 77'	Report	Kaletka 26'

Mokpo International Football Center Secondly Stadium
Referee: Maria Rebello (India)

=== 7th place match ===
12 July 2015
16:30

South Korea	4–3	Czech Republic
Hong Hye-ji 5'; Jang Sel-gi 11', 26'; Kim In-ji 75'	Report	Ivaničová 13'; Svitková 24'; Bartoňová 38' (pen.)

Jeongeup Public Stadium
Referee: Li Juan (China)

=== 5th place match ===
12 July 2015
16:30

China	2–1	Brazil
Zhao Rong 4'; Li Wen 17'	Report	Pereira da Cruz 65'

Yeonggwang Sportium Football Field
Referee: Anastasia Pustovoitova (Russia)

=== Bronze medal match ===
12 July 2015
16:00

Japan	5–0	Canada
Yokoyama 22'; Kawahara 30'; Yamamoto 34'; Takahashi 69'; Uemura 84'	Report

Naju Public Stadium
Referee: Karolina Radzik-Johan (Poland)

=== Gold medal match ===
13 July 2015
19:00

Russia	0–2	France
	Report	Gauvin 68'; Kipiatkova 83' (o.g.)

Naju Public Stadium
Referee: Jung Ji-young (South Korea)

== Final standings ==
Place	Team	Score
1st place, gold medalist(s)	France	
2nd place, silver medalist(s)	Russia	
3rd place, bronze medalist(s)	Japan	
4	Canada	
5	China	
6	Brazil	
7	South Korea	
8	Czech Republic	
9	Mexico	
10	Poland	
11	Chinese Taipei	
12	United States	
13	Republic of Ireland	
14	South Africa	
15	Colombia	
