= Tennis at the 2015 Summer Universiade =

- Date: 4–12 July
- Edition: 17th
- Location: Jinwol International Tennis Court, Gwangju

Champions

Men's singles
- Chung Hyeon (KOR)

Women's singles
- Chang Kai-chen (TPE)

Men's doubles
- Joe Salisbury / Darren Walsh (GBR)

Women's doubles
- Han Na-lae / Lee So-ra (KOR)

Mixed doubles
- Lidziya Marozava / Andrei Vasilevski (BLR)

Men's team
- South Korea (KOR)

Women's team
- Chinese Taipei (TPE)
| ← 2013 · | Summer Universiade | · 2017 → |

Tennis was contested at the 2015 Summer Universiade from July 4 to 12 at the Tennis Academy in Gwangju, South Korea. Men's and women's singles, men's and women's team, and men's, women's, and mixed doubles events was contested.

== Medal summary ==
=== Medal table ===
* Host nation (South Korea)

| Rank | Nation | Gold | Silver | Bronze | Total |
|---|---|---|---|---|---|
| 1 | South Korea (KOR)* | 3 | 1 | 1 | 5 |
| 2 | Chinese Taipei (TPE) | 2 | 2 | 3 | 7 |
| 3 | Great Britain (GBR) | 1 | 1 | 0 | 2 |
| 4 | Belarus (BLR) | 1 | 0 | 0 | 1 |
| 5 | Thailand (THA) | 0 | 2 | 2 | 4 |
| 6 | Russia (RUS) | 0 | 1 | 2 | 3 |
| 7 | Japan (JPN) | 0 | 0 | 2 | 2 |
| 8 | France (FRA) | 0 | 0 | 1 | 1 |
| 8 | Indonesia (INA) | 0 | 0 | 1 | 1 |
| Totals (9 entries) | | 7 | 7 | 12 | 26 |

=== Medal events ===
| Event | Gold | Silver | Bronze |
|---|---|---|---|
| Men's singles | Chung Hyeon; South Korea | Aslan Karatsev; Russia | Lucas Poullain; France |
| Men's singles | Chung Hyeon; South Korea | Aslan Karatsev; Russia | Yang Tsung-hua; Chinese Taipei |
| Women's singles | Chang Kai-chen; Chinese Taipei | Luksika Kumkhum; Thailand | Beatrice Gumulya; Indonesia |
| Women's singles | Chang Kai-chen; Chinese Taipei | Luksika Kumkhum; Thailand | Varatchaya Wongteanchai; Thailand |
| Men's doubles | Great Britain (GBR); Joe Salisbury; Darren Walsh | South Korea (KOR); Chung Hyeon; Nam Ji-sung | Chinese Taipei (TPE); Lee Hsin-han; Peng Hsien-yin |
| Men's doubles | Great Britain (GBR); Joe Salisbury; Darren Walsh | South Korea (KOR); Chung Hyeon; Nam Ji-sung | Japan (JPN); Shintaro Imai; Kaito Uesugi |
| Women's doubles | South Korea (KOR); Han Na-lae; Lee So-ra | Chinese Taipei (TPE); Hsu Chieh-yu; Lee Ya-hsuan | Japan (JPN); Erina Hayashi; Aiko Yoshitomi |
| Women's doubles | South Korea (KOR); Han Na-lae; Lee So-ra | Chinese Taipei (TPE); Hsu Chieh-yu; Lee Ya-hsuan | Thailand (THA); Noppawan Lertcheewakarn; Varatchaya Wongteanchai |
| Mixed doubles | Belarus (BLR); Lidziya Marozava; Andrei Vasilevski | Great Britain (GBR); Alexandra Walker; Darren Walsh | Chinese Taipei (TPE); Chang Kai-chen; Peng Hsien-yin |
| Mixed doubles | Belarus (BLR); Lidziya Marozava; Andrei Vasilevski | Great Britain (GBR); Alexandra Walker; Darren Walsh | Russia (RUS); Veronika Kudermetova; Aslan Karatsev |
| Men's team | South Korea (KOR); Chung Hyeon; Chung Hong; Lee Jea-moon; Nam Ji-sung | Chinese Taipei (TPE); Lee Hsin-han; Peng Hsien-yin; Huang Liang-chi; Yang Tsung-hua | Russia (RUS); Aslan Karatsev; Evgeny Tyurnev |
| Women's team | Chinese Taipei (TPE); Chang Kai-chen; Hsu Chieh-yu; Hsieh Yu-chieh; Lee Ya-hsuan | Thailand (THA); Varatchaya Wongteanchai; Noppawan Lertcheewakarn; Luksika Kumkhum | South Korea (KOR); Jang Su-jeong; Han Na-lae; Lee So-ra |

== See also ==
- Tennis at the Summer Universiade
