= Basketball at the 2015 Summer Universiade =

Basketball at the XXVIII Summer Universiade
- Venue: various
- Dates: July 4, 2015 – July 13, 2015
- Teams: 24 (men); 16 (women)

Basketball was contested at the 2015 Summer Universiade from July 4 to July 13 in Gwangju, South Korea. In total, 40 teams competed in the 2015 Summer Universiade (24 men's teams and 16 women's teams).

== Medal summary ==
=== Medal table ===
Rank	Nation	Gold	Silver	Bronze	Total
1	United States (USA)	2	0	0	2
2	Canada (CAN)	0	1	0	1
2	Germany (GER)	0	1	0	1
4	Russia (RUS)	0	0	2	2
Totals (4 entries)		2	2	2	6

=== Medal events ===
Event	Gold	Silver	Bronze
Men	United States (USA)	Germany (GER)	Russia (RUS)
Women	United States (USA)	Canada (CAN)	Russia (RUS)

== Men ==
=== Teams ===
Africa	Americas	Asia	Europe	Oceania
Angola; Mozambique	Brazil; Canada; Chile; Mexico; United States	South Korea; China; Japan; Mongolia; Chinese Taipei	Estonia; Finland; France; Germany; Lithuania; Montenegro; Russia; Serbia; Sweden; Switzerland; Turkey	Australia

== Women ==
=== Teams ===
Africa	Americas	Asia	Europe	Oceania
Mozambique; Uganda	Brazil; Canada; Mexico; United States	South Korea; China; Chinese Taipei; Japan	Czech Republic; Hungary; Italy; Russia; Sweden	Australia
