= Germany at the 2015 Summer Universiade =

- IOC code: GER
- NOC: Deutscher Olympischer Sportbund
- Website: http://www.dosb.de

in Gwangju, South Korea 3 – 14 July 2015
- Competitors: 115 in 13 sports
- Medals Ranked 12th: Gold 5 Silver 5 Bronze 8 Total 18

Summer Universiade appearances
- 1959; 1961; 1963; 1965; 1967; 1970; 1973; 1975; 1977; 1979; 1981; 1983; 1985; 1987; 1989; 1991; 1993; 1995; 1997; 1999; 2001; 2003; 2005; 2007; 2009; 2011; 2013; 2015; 2017; 2019; 2021; 2025; 2027

Germany participated at the 2015 Summer Universiade, in Gwangju, South Korea.

== Medals by sport ==
Sport	Grand Total			
Sport	1st place, gold medalist(s)	2nd place, silver medalist(s)	3rd place, bronze medalist(s)	Total
Athletics	3	2	2	7
Basketball	0	1	0	1
Gymnastics	1	0	0	1
Judo	0	0	3	3
Rowing	1	2	2	5
Taekwondo	0	0	1	1
Total	5	5	8	18

== Medalists ==
Medal	Name	Sport	Event	Date
Gold	Jakob Schneider; Clemens Ernsting; Tobias Oppermann; Arne Schwiethal	Rowing	Men's Coxless Four	6 July
Gold	Fabian Hambüchen	Gymnastics	Horizontal Bar	7 July
Gold	Martin Grau	Athletics	Men's 3000m Steeplechase	11 July
Gold	Anna Maiwalt	Athletics	Women's Heptathlon	11 July
Gold	Lena Urbaniak	Athletics	Women's Shot Put	11 July
Silver	Tobias Franzmann; Torben Neumann; Can Temel; Stefan Wallat	Rowing	Men's Lightweight Coxless Four	6 July
Silver	Ulrike Toerpsch; Lea-Kathleen Kuehne; Johanna Te Neues; Anna-Maria Goetz	Rowing	Women's Coxless Four	6 July
Silver	Marike Steinacker	Athletics	Women's Discus Throw	9 July
Silver	Jenny Elbe	Athletics	Women's Triple Jump	11 July
Silver	Konstantin Klein; Niklas Geske; Dennis Kramer; Mathis Moenninghoff; Maurice Pluskota; Kevin Bright; Stephan Haukohl; Maodo Lo; Bogdan Radosavljevic; David Brembly; Hans Brase; Johannes Thiemann	Basketball	Men	13 July
Bronze	Dino Pfeiffer	Judo	Men's -100 kg	4 July
Bronze	Maike Ziech	Judo	Women's -78 kg	4 July
Bronze	Nadja Badzynski	Judo	Women's -63 kg	5 July
Bronze	Timo Piontek; Tim Grohmann	Rowing	Men's Double Sculls	7 July
Bronze	Carolin Franzke	Rowing	Women's Lightweight Single Sculls	7 July
Bronze	Rene Alexander Stauss	Athletics	Men's Decathlon	9 July
Bronze	Fabienne Kohlmann	Athletics	Women's 800m	10 July
Bronze	Ewald Glesmann	Taekwondo	Men's -74 kg	11 July
