= Athletics at the 2015 Summer Universiade – Women's 10,000 metres =

The women's 10,000 metres event at the 2015 Summer Universiade was held on 8 July at the Gwangju Universiade Main Stadium.

== Medalists ==
Gold	Silver	Bronze
Alla Kulyatina; Russia	Gulshat Fazlitdinova; Russia	Zhang Yingying; China

== Results ==
Rank	Name	Nationality	Time	Notes
1st place, gold medalist(s)	Alla Kulyatina	Russia	32:52.27	PB
2nd place, silver medalist(s)	Gulshat Fazlitdinova	Russia	32:55.35	
3rd place, bronze medalist(s)	Zhang Yingying	China	32:56.60	SB
4	Katrina Allison	Canada	33:29.16	
5	Rina Koeda	Japan	33:47.21	
6	Sanjivani Jadhav	India	33:54.57	PB
7	Bayartsogt Munkhzaya	Mongolia	33:54.93	
8	Xiao Huimin	China	34:24.01	SB
9	Sakie Arai	Japan	34:24.92	
10	Daniela da Cunha	Portugal	34:51.68	
11	Hanane Oubaali	Morocco	35:42.83	
12	Nubia Arteaga	Venezuela	36:47.97	SB
13	Marcelat Sakobi	Democratic Republic of the Congo	41:29.63	
13	Ilsida Toemere	Suriname	44:25.38	
	Zhang Meixia	China	DQ	R163.3
