= Mikhail Burchalin =

Russian sport shooter

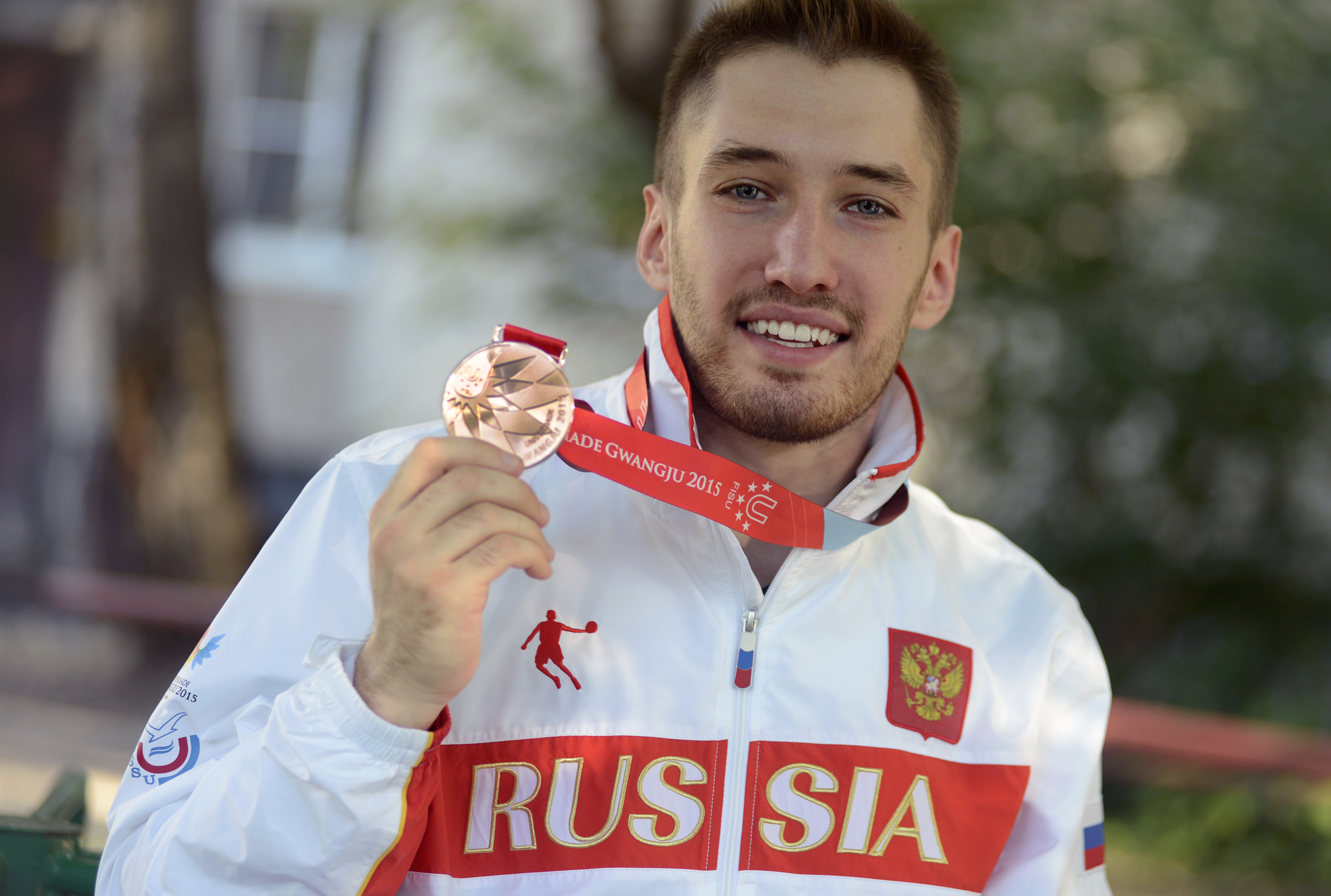

Personal information
- Full name: Mikhail Aleksandrovich Burchalin
- Nationality: Russian
- Born: 25 June 1993 (age 33) Tambov, Russia
- Height: 1.86 m (6 ft 1 in)
- Weight: 81 kg (179 lb; 12 st 11 lb)

Sport
- Country: Russia
- Sport: Sports shooting
- Event(s): 50 meter rifle three positions, 50 meter rifle prone, 10 meter air rifle
- Team: Russia National Shooting Team
- Coached by: Anatoly Molchanov
Medal record
Men's shooting
Representing Russia
2015 Summer Universiade
Bronze medal – third place	2015 Gwangju	50 m rifle TP

Mikhail Aleksandrovich Burchalin (Russian: Михаил Александрович Бурчалин; born June 25, 1993) is a Russian sport shooter. He represented Russia at the 2015 Summer Universiade, most notably winning a bronze at the Men's 50 metre rifle three positions.

== Biography and career ==
Mikhail studied at the Tambov State University named after G. R. Derzhavin (Russian: Тамбовский государственный университет имени Г. Р. Державина). He has been training for the shooting club of DOSAAF since 2004. Mikhail trains under the guidance of Master of Sports USSR Molchanov A.A.

Mikhail repeatedly became the winner and prize-winner of the Russian Championships and competitions of Russian national level, after which in 2011 he joined the Russian national team.

In 2013 he won his first international medal, a gold medal at the World DOSAAF Championship in Dushanbe (team standings). The same year, he was a candidate to participate in the World Summer Universiade 2013 in Kazan. But because of a problem with the weapon Mikhail unsuccessfully made in crucial qualifying start, thus placed the fifth on the qualifying list (only three people can be in command).

Two years later he passed selection at the World Summer Universiade 2015 (Gwangju, South Korea) and won a bronze medal in shooting small-bore rifle from a distance of 50 meters from three positions.

== Outside of sports ==
In 2015, he graduated from Tambov State University named after G. R. Derzhavin with a degree in information technology and in the same year entered the same university for a master's degree in high-performance sports.
