= Russia at the 2015 Summer Universiade =

- IOC code: RUS
- NOC: Russian Olympic Committee
- Website: http://www.roc.ru/

in Gwangju, South Korea 3 – 14 July 2015
- Competitors: 453 in 19 sports
- Medals Ranked 2nd: Gold 34 Silver 39 Bronze 49 Total 122

Summer Universiade appearances (overview)
- 1993; 1995; 1997; 1999; 2001; 2003; 2005; 2007; 2009; 2011; 2013; 2015; 2017; 2019; 2021; 2025; 2027

Russia participated at the 2015 Summer Universiade, in Gwangju, South Korea. Of around 669 people, 471 were athletes, the rest coaches, managers and masseurs. Eight athletes were Merited Masters of Sport, 108 world-class Masters of Sport, 236 Masters of Sport and 114 candidates. The delegation was composed of people from 58 subjects of the Russian Federation, the majority coming from Moscow (112 people), Republic of Tatarstan (40 people) and Saint Petersburg (30 people).

== Medals by sport ==
Mixed events are listed as both women and men.

| Sport | Men | | | | Women | | | | Grand Total | | | |
| Sport | 1st place, gold medalist(s) | 2nd place, silver medalist(s) | 3rd place, bronze medalist(s) | Total | 1st place, gold medalist(s) | 2nd place, silver medalist(s) | 3rd place, bronze medalist(s) | Total | 1st place, gold medalist(s) | 2nd place, silver medalist(s) | 3rd place, bronze medalist(s) | Total |
|---|---|---|---|---|---|---|---|---|---|---|---|---|
| Athletics | 5 | 3 | 5 | 13 | 7 | 5 | 4 | 16 | 12 | 8 | 9 | 29 |
| Gymnastics | 0 | 0 | 0 | 0 | 6 | 3 | 4 | 13 | 6 | 3 | 4 | 13 |
| Swimming | 4 | 0 | 3 | 7 | 1 | 2 | 1 | 4 | 5 | 2 | 4 | 11 |
| Shooting | 3 | 7 | 4 | 14 | 0 | 4 | 3 | 6 | 3 | 11 | 7 | 21 |
| Diving | 2 | 3 | 1 | 6 | 1 | 0 | 1 | 2 | 2 | 3 | 2 | 7 |
| Volleyball | 1 | 0 | 0 | 1 | 1 | 0 | 0 | 1 | 2 | 0 | 0 | 2 |
| Fencing | 0 | 2 | 0 | 2 | 1 | 4 | 3 | 8 | 1 | 6 | 3 | 10 |
| Judo | 1 | 2 | 4 | 7 | 0 | 1 | 2 | 3 | 1 | 3 | 6 | 10 |
| Archery | 0 | 0 | 2 | 2 | 1 | 0 | 2 | 3 | 1 | 0 | 3 | 4 |
| Handball | 0 | 0 | 0 | 0 | 1 | 0 | 0 | 1 | 1 | 0 | 0 | 1 |
| Taekwondo | 0 | 0 | 4 | 4 | 0 | 1 | 1 | 2 | 0 | 1 | 5 | 6 |
| Tennis | 0 | 1 | 2 | 3 | 0 | 0 | 1 | 1 | 0 | 1 | 2 | 3 |
| Football | 0 | 0 | 0 | 0 | 0 | 1 | 0 | 1 | 0 | 1 | 0 | 1 |
| Basketball | 0 | 0 | 1 | 0 | 0 | 0 | 1 | 1 | 0 | 0 | 2 | 2 |
| Table tennis | 0 | 0 | 1 | 1 | 0 | 0 | 1 | 1 | 0 | 0 | 1 | 1 |
| Water polo | 0 | 0 | 0 | 0 | 0 | 0 | 1 | 1 | 0 | 0 | 1 | 1 |
| Total | 16 | 18 | 27 | 61 | 19 | 24 | 25 | 68 | 34 | 39 | 49 | 122 |

== Medalists ==
| Medal | Name | Sport | Event | Date |
|---|---|---|---|---|
| Gold | Evgenii Novoselov; Viacheslav Novoselov | Diving | Men's 3 m synchronized springboard | 5 July |
| Gold | Khasan Khalmurzaev | Judo | Men's welterweight (81 kg) | 5 July |
| Gold | Polina Fedorova; Daria Elizarova; Maria Paseka; Alla Sidorenko; Ekaterina Kramarenko | Gymnastics | Women's artistic team all-around | 5 July |
| Gold | Anna Bashta | Fencing | Women's sabre | 6 July |
| Gold | Natalia Avdeeva; Svetlana Cherkashneva; Maria Vinogradova | Archery | Women's team compound | 7 July |
| Gold | Polina Fedorova | Gymnastics | Women's artistic floor | 7 July |
| Gold | Ekaterina Kramarenko | Gymnastics | Women's uneven bar | 7 July |
| Gold | Maria Paseka | Gymnastics | Women's vault | 7 July |
| Gold | Evgeny Koptelov | Swimming | Men's 200 m butterfly | 7 July |
| Gold | Alla Kuliatina | Athletics | Women's 1000 m | 8 July |
| Gold | Nikita Sukhanov; Andrei Shchepetkov; Dmitry Brayko | Shooting | Men's team 25 m rapid fire | 8 July |
| Gold | Kirill Grigorian; Andrei Shchepetkov; Dmitry Brayko | Shooting | Men's 50 m rifle prone | 8 July |
| Gold | Igor Maximov | Athletics | Men's 1000 m | 9 July |
| Gold | Dimitri Sorokin | Athletics | Men's triple jump | 9 July |
| Gold | Yulia Pidluzhnaya | Athletics | Women's long jump | 9 July |
| Gold | Yulia Maltseva | Athletics | Women's discus throw | 9 July |
| Gold | Daria Govor; Igor Mialin | Diving | Mixed team | 9 July |
| Gold | Alexandr Bondar; Nikolay Teplyy; Anatoly Fedorov | Shooting | Men's team skeet | 9 July |
| Gold | Evgeny Koptelov | Swimming | Men's 100 m butterfly | 9 July |
| Gold | Daniil Kharitonov | Athletics | Men's 1500 m | 10 July |
| Gold | Daniil Tsyplakov | Athletics | Men's high jump | 10 July |
| Gold | Ekaterina Sokolenko | Athletics | Women's 3000 m steeplechase | 10 July |
| Gold | Anisya Kirdyapkina | Athletics | Women's 20 km walk | 10 July |
| Gold | Anisya Kirdyapkina; Marina Pandakova; Sofiya Brodatskaya; Lina Kalutskaya | Athletics | Women's team 20 km walk | 10 July |
| Gold | Rozaliya Nasretdinova | Swimming | Women's 50 m freestyle | 10 July |
| Gold | Evgeny Koptelov; Oleg Kostin; Aleksandr Sadovnikov; Mikhail Polishchuk | Swimming | Men's 4 × 100 m medley relay | 10 July |
| Gold | Anton Evsikov | Swimming | Men's 10 km marathon | 11 July |
| Gold | Ekaterina Koneva | Athletics | Women's triple jump | 11 July |
| Gold | Russia women's national volleyball team: Svetlana Serbina; Anastasia Barchuk; Anastasia Bavykina; Ekaterina Romanenko; Daria Pisarenko; Daria Isaeva; Irina Zaryazhko; Irina Flishtinskaia; Anastasia Chernaya; Irina Malkova; Irina Voronkova; Olesya Nikolaeva | Volleyball | Women's tournament | 11 July |
| Gold | Pavel Shalin | Athletics | Men's long jump | 12 July |
| Gold | Daria Avtonomova; Valentina Kalinina; Daria Kolobova; Yulia Kosyreva; Arina Nikishova; Anastasia Osipova | Gymnastics | Women's rhythmic group all-around | 12 July |
| Gold | Russia men's national volleyball team: Pavel Pankov; Ilia Vlasov; Dmitry Kovalev; Egor Feoktistov; Ilyas Kurkaev; Alexander Markin; Igor Philippov; Aleksei Kabeshov; Alexander Kimerov; Maksim Zhigalov; Egor Kliuka; Sergei Nikitin | Volleyball | Men's tournament | 12 July |
| Gold | Anastasia Osipova; Arina Nikishiva; Daria Avtonomova; Daria Kolobova; Iuliia Kosyreva; Valentina Kalinina | Gymnastics | Women's rhythmic group 5 ribbons | 13 July |
| Gold | Russia women's national handball team: Natalia Reshetnikova; Polina Gorshkova; Natalia Chigirinova; Valentina Goncharova; Anna Vyakhireva; Veronika Garanina; Ksenia Makeeva; Evgeniya Petrova; Anna Shukalova; Polina Vedekhina; Elena Utkina; Alena Ikhneva; Daria Vakhterova; Ksenia Karpacheva; Anastasia Kudriashova; Evelina Anoshkina | Handball | Women's tournament | 13 July |
| Silver | Evgenii Novoselov | Diving | Men's 3 m springboard | 4 July |
| Silver | Dmitry Danilenko | Fencing | Men's sabre | 4 July |
| Silver | Viktoriia Kuzmenkova | Fencing | Women's épée | 4 July |
| Silver | Magomed Nazhmudinov | Judo | Men's heavyweight (+100 kg) | 4 July |
| Silver | Alena Kachorovskaya | Judo | Women's light heavyweight (-78 kg) | 4 July |
| Silver | Svetlana Tripapina | Fencing | Women's foil | 5 July |
| Silver | Khusen Khalmurzaev | Judo | Men's middleweight (90 kg) | 5 July |
| Silver | Svetlana Krasheninnikova; Zoia Khokhlova; Ekaterina Rabaya | Shooting | Women's team trap | 5 July |
| Silver | Svetlana Chimrova | Swimming | Women's 50 m butterfly | 5 July |
| Silver | Alexander Pivovarov | Fencing | Men's foil | 6 July |
| Silver | Viktoriia Kuzmenkova | Fencing | Women's épée | 6 July |
| Silver | Rinat Aiupov | Shooting | Men's 50 m pistol | 6 July |
| Silver | Rinat Aiupov; Nikolai Kilin; Ruslan Visloguzov | Shooting | Men's team 50 m pistol | 6 July |
| Silver | Polina Fedorova | Gymnastics | Women's balance beam | 7 July |
| Silver | Daria Elizarova | Gymnastics | Women's floor | 7 July |
| Silver | Gulshat Fazlitdinova | Athletics | Women's 1000 m | 8 July |
| Silver | Nikita Sukhanov | Shooting | Men's 25 m rapid fire pistol | 8 July |
| Silver | Natalia Vinogradova | Shooting | Women's skeet | 8 July |
| Silver | Maria Meleshchenko; Natalia Vinogradova; Ekaterina Begoulova | Shooting | Women's team skeet | 8 July |
| Silver | Igor Mialin | Diving | Men's 10 m platform | 9 July |
| Silver | Russia | Diving | Men's team | 9 July |
| Silver | Alexandra Shatalova; Anna Bashta; Evgeniia Karbolina; Alina Meshcheriakova | Fencing | Women's team sabre | 9 July |
| Silver | Alexandr Bondar | Shooting | Men's skeet | 9 July |
| Silver | Valentina Protasova | Shooting | Women's 50 m rifle three positions | 9 July |
| Silver | Nina Morozova | Athletics | Women's 100 m hurdles | 10 July |
| Silver | Natalia Vlasova | Athletics | Women's 3000 m steeplechase | 10 July |
| Silver | Marina Pandakova | Athletics | Women's 20 km walk | 10 July |
| Silver | Kirill Grigorian | Shooting | Men's 50 m rifle three positions | 10 July |
| Silver | Artem Nekrasov | Shooting | Men's double trap | 10 July |
| Silver | Anton Slepushkin; Artem Nekrasov; Maksim Lazarev | Shooting | Men's team double trap | 10 July |
| Silver | Elizaveta Bazarova | Swimming | Women's 50 m freestyle | 10 July |
| Silver | Konstantin Shabanov | Athletics | Men's 110 m hurdles | 11 July |
| Silver | Ilya Mudrov | Athletics | Men's pole vault | 11 July |
| Silver | Vasily Kopeikin | Athletics | Men's long jump | 12 July |
| Silver | Elena Zuykevich; Irina Takuntseva; Kristina Malvinova; Lilya Gafiyatullina | Athletics | Women's 4 × 400 m relay | 12 July |
| Silver | Russia women's national football team: Elena Kochneva; Karina Blinskaya; Anna Kozhnikova; Lyubov Kipyatkova; Elena Morozova; Natalia Osipova; Ekaterina Dmitrenko; Elvira Ziyastinova; Anna Cholovyaga; Elena Terekhova; Alena Nurgalieva; Yulia Grichenko; Valentina Orlova; Elena Kostareva; Yulia Bessolova; Daria Makarenko; Ekaterina Pantiukhina; Anastasia Pozdeeva; Ksenia Tsybutovich; Margarita Chernomyrdina | Football | Women's tournament | 12 July |
| Silver | Aslan Karatsev | Tennis | Men's singles | 12 July |
| Silver | Maria Titova | Gymnastics | Women's rhythmic individual hoop | 13 July |
| Silver | Alina Ikaeva; Tatiana Kudashova; Elena Evlampyeva; Yulia Turutina | Taekwondo | Women's team Kyorugi | 13 July |
| Bronze | Yulia Lichagina | Fencing | Women's épée | 4 July |
| Bronze | Niiaz Bilalov | Judo | Men's light heavyweight (-100 kg) | 4 July |
| Bronze | Ivan Kuzmenko; Oleg Tikhobaev; Alexander Tikhonov; Mikhail Polishchuk | Swimming | Men's 4 × 100 m freestyle relay | 4 July |
| Bronze | Polina Lapshina; Margarita Nesterova; Elizaveta Bazarova; Rozaliya Nasretdinova | Swimming | Women's 4 × 100 m freestyle relay | 4 July |
| Bronze | Kristina Novalinska | Fencing | Women's foil | 5 July |
| Bronze | Niiaz Bilalov | Judo | Men's featherweight (-66 kg) | 6 July |
| Bronze | Anastasia Ryzhikh; Margarita Semenova; Alena Doroshkevich | Shooting | Women's team 25 m pistol | 6 July |
| Bronze | Maria Paseka | Gymnastics | Women's uneven bars | 7 July |
| Bronze | Daria Elizarova | Gymnastics | Women's vault | 7 July |
| Bronze | Egor Galperin; Igor Mialin | Diving | Men's synchronized 10 m springboard | 7 July |
| Bronze | Aleksandra Babintseva | Judo | Women's open weight | 7 July |
| Bronze | Nikita Ulyanov | Swimming | Men's 50 m backstroke | 7 July |
| Bronze | Galsan Bazarzhapov; Artem Makhnenko; Bair Tsybekdorzhiev | Archery | Men's team recurve | 8 July |
| Bronze | Galsan Bazarzhapov; Inna Stepanova | Archery | Mixed team recurve | 8 July |
| Bronze | Alexander Bulanov | Athletics | Men's shot put | 8 July |
| Bronze | Kristina Novalinska; Leyla Pirieva; Oxana Pogrebnyak; Svetlana Tripapina | Fencing | Women's team foil | 8 July |
| Bronze | Albert Oguzov | Judo | Men's bantamweight (-60 kg) | 8 July |
| Bronze | Anzaur Ardanov | Judo | Men's featherweight (-66 kg) | 8 July |
| Bronze | Arzem Gulyayev; Bogdan Iadov; Mykhailo Ilytchuk; Dmytro Kanivets; Dmytro Luchyn; Fedir Panko; Anton Rudnyk; Denys Tolkach | Judo | Men's team | 8 July |
| Bronze | Aleksandra Babintseva; Anna Dmitrieva; Alena Kachorovskaya; Anastasiia Konkina; Liliia Lotfullina; Aydana Nagorova; Aleksandra Prokopenko; Pari Surakatova | Judo | Women's team | 8 July |
| Bronze | Maria Meleshchenko | Shooting | Women's skeet | 8 July |
| Bronze | Margarita Semenova; Alena Doroshkevich; Regina Rizvanova | Shooting | Women's team 10 m air pistol | 8 July |
| Bronze | Sergei Sharypov; Aleksandr Nazarov; Vladislav Maksimov | Athletics | Men's team 20 km walk | 9 July |
| Bronze | Elena Kozlova | Athletics | Women's 100 m | 9 July |
| Bronze | Russia | Diving | Women's team | 9 July |
| Bronze | Dmitry Brayko | Shooting | Men's 25 m standard pistol | 9 July |
| Bronze | Dmitry Brayko; Andrei Shchepetkov; Nikita Sukhanov | Shooting | Men's team 25 m standard pistol | 9 July |
| Bronze | Andrei Shabasov | Swimming | Men's 200 m backstroke | 9 July |
| Bronze | Il En Ten | Taekwondo | Men's finweight (-54 kg) | 9 July |
| Bronze | Ivan Shablyuev | Athletics | Men's 400 m hurdles | 10 July |
| Bronze | Irina Takuntceva | Athletics | Women's 400 m hurdles | 10 July |
| Bronze | Nikolai Kilin; Rinat Aiupov; Ruslan Visloguzov | Shooting | Men's team 10 m air pistol | 10 July |
| Bronze | Kirill Grigorian; Dmitrii Sedov; Mikhail Burchalin | Shooting | Men's team 50 m rifle three positions | 10 July |
| Bronze | Renat Tukhvatullin | Taekwondo | Men's flyweight (-58 kg) | 10 July |
| Bronze | Said Ustaev | Taekwondo | Men's lightweight (-74 kg) | 11 July |
| Bronze | Yuri Kloptsov | Athletics | Men's 3000 m steeplechase | 11 July |
| Bronze | Anna Petrich | Athletics | Women's heptathlon | 11 July |
| Bronze | Taras Merzlikin; Yana Noskova | Table tennis | Mixed doubles | 11 July |
| Bronze | Alina Ikaeva | Taekwondo | Women's heavyweight (+73 kg) | 11 July |
| Bronze | Veronika Kudermetova; Aslan Karatsev | Tennis | Mixed doubles | 11 July |
| Bronze | Rinas Akhmadeev | Athletics | Men's 5000 m | 12 July |
| Bronze | Kristina Ugarova | Athletics | Women's 1500 m | 12 July |
| Bronze | Aslan Karatsev; Evgeny Tyurnev | Tennis | Men's team | 12 July |
| Bronze | Russia women's national basketball team: Daria Namok; Alexandra Stolyar; Evgenia Finogentova; Maria Kaitukova; Viktoria Medvedeva; Anastasiya Shilova; Olga Novikova; Maria-Margarita Davydova; Ksenia Tikhonenko; Olesia Sedletskaya; Yulia Gladkova; Yulia Poluianova | Basketball | Women's tournament | 12 July |
| Bronze | Maria Titova | Gymnastics | Women's rhythmic individual ball | 13 July |
| Bronze | Anastasia Osipova; Arina Nikishiva; Daria Avtonomova; Daria Kolobova; Iuliia Kosyreva; Valentina Kalinina | Gymnastics | Women's rhythmic group 6 clubs + 2 hoops | 13 July |
| Bronze | Russia men's national basketball team: Denis Zakharov; Artem Sokolov; Aleksandr Gudumak; Nikita Barinov; Victor Zaryazhko; Stanislav Ilnitskiy; Artem Klimenko; Artem Vikhrov; Andrei Desiatnikov; Ivan Strebkov; Pavel Antipov; Mikhail Kulagin | Basketball | Men's tournament | 13 July |
| Bronze | Alexey Pryzhnikov; Renat Tukhvatullin; Said Ustaev; Viacheslav Minin | Taekwondo | Men's team Kyorugi | 13 July |
| Bronze | Russia women's national water polo team: Anna Ustyukhina; Tatiana Zubkova; Maria Donskykh; Anastasia Simanovich; Kristina Nezmanova; Olga Koryakina; Valeria Kolmakova; Evgeniya Abdriziakova; Natalia Churzina; Marina Savitskaya; Tatiana Kovina; Maria Nizheboichenko; Alina Litovchenko | Water polo | Women's tournament | 13 July |

== See also ==
- Russia at the Universiade
