= Canada at the 2015 Summer Universiade =

- IOC code: CAN
- NOC: Canadian Olympic Committee
- Website: www.olympic.ca

in Gwangju
- Competitors: 333 in 21 sports
- Flag bearer: Alicia Perrin
- Medals Ranked 21st: Gold 2 Silver 4 Bronze 2 Total 8

Summer Universiade appearances
- 1959; 1961; 1963; 1965; 1967; 1970; 1973; 1975; 1977; 1979; 1981; 1983; 1985; 1987; 1989; 1991; 1993; 1995; 1997; 1999; 2001; 2003; 2005; 2007; 2009; 2011; 2013; 2015; 2017; 2019; 2021; 2025; 2027

Canada competed at the 2015 Summer Universiade in Gwangju, South Korea.

== Medals by sport ==
=== Medal by sports ===
Sport	1st place, gold medalist(s)	2nd place, silver medalist(s)	3rd place, bronze medalist(s)	Total
Athletics	0	2	1	3
Basketball	0	1	0	1
Diving	1	0	1	2
Swimming	1	0	0	1
Water polo	0	1	0	1
Total	2	4	2	8

== Medalists ==
Medal	Name	Sport	Event	Date
Gold	Carol-Ann Ware; Celina Jayne Toth	Diving	Women's synchronized 10 metre platform	6 July
Gold	Kylie Masse	Swimming	Women's 100 metre backstroke	7 July
Silver	Benjamin Thorne	Athletics	Men's 20 km walk	9 July
Silver	Gabriela Stafford	Athletics	Women's 1500m	12 July
Silver	Dakota Whyte; Samantha Hill; Korissa Williams; Laura Dally; Karly Roser; Meg Wilson; Michelle Hudyn; Quinn Urbaniak-Dornstauder; Omowumi Agunbiade; Adut Bulgak; Abigail Fogg; Ruth Hamblin	Basketball	Women's basketball	13 July
Silver	Nicola Colterjohn; Kelly Blair Mckee; Axelle Crevier; Taylor Marie Molde; Roxane Crevier; Sarah Jane Myers; Kyra Christmas; Elyse Lemay-Lavoie; Hayley Mckelvey; Kelly Matthews; Kindred Ayre Paul; Alexa Tielmann; Kelsey Jensen	Water polo	Women's water polo	13 July
Bronze	Celine Jayne Toth; Cameron Reid Mclean	Diving	Mixed team event	9 July
Bronze	Brittany Crew	Athletics	Women's shot put	11 July

== Basketball ==
Canada qualified both a men's and a women's team.

=== Group B ===
Team	Pld	W	L	PF	PA	PD	Pts
Russia	5	5	0	396	286	+110	10
Canada	5	4	1	392	294	+98	9
Sweden	5	3	2	334	327	+7	8
Montenegro	5	2	3	351	301	+50	7
Mexico	5	1	4	344	397	−53	6
Mongolia	5	0	5	253	465	−212	5

=== Quarterfinals ===
11 July 2015
12:00

Germany	79–73	Canada
Scoring by quarter: 16-16, 16-13, 18-19, 29-25

Gwangju University Gymnasium

==== 5th–8th place ====
12 July 2015
12:30

Report

Canada	46–64	France
Scoring by quarter: 13–11, 10–20, 14–11, 9–22

Gwangju University Gymnasium

=== Group A ===
Team	Pld	W	L	PF	PA	PD	Pts
Canada	3	3	0	229	151	+78	6
Hungary	3	2	1	223	169	+54	5
South Korea	3	1	2	177	246	−69	4
Mozambique	3	0	3	152	215	−63	3

=== Quarterfinals ===
11 July 2015
12:00

Report

Czech Republic	53–61	Canada

Gwangju University Gymnasium

=== Semifinals ===
12 July 2015
15:00

[http:// Report]

Canada	70–60	Russia

Dongkang College Gymnasium

=== Gold-medal game ===
13 July 2015
21:00

[http:// Report]

Canada	63–82	United States

Yeomju Gymnasium

== Football ==
Canada qualified both a men's and a women's football team.

=== Men ===
==== Group A ====
Team	Pld	W	D	L	GF	GA	GD	Pts
South Korea	3	3	0	0	7	2	+5	9
Italy	3	1	1	1	5	3	+2	4
Chinese Taipei	3	1	1	1	2	3	−1	4
Canada	3	0	0	3	3	9	−6	0

==== 9th–16th place ====
9 July 2015
11:00

Russia	2–0	Canada
Karasev 90' (pen.), 90+3'	Report

Mokpo International Football Center Secondly Stadium
Referee: Nivon Robesh Gamini (Sri Lanka)

==== 13th-place game ====
13 July 2015
11:00

Canada	1–1	Iran
Elkinson 90+2'	Report	Shajie 6'
Penalties
Murphy (penalty scored); Cook (penalty scored); Elkinson (penalty scored); Greedy (penalty scored)	4–1	Hossseinpouraghamolki (penalty missed); Zahiri (penalty missed); Karamibaseri (penalty scored)

Yeonggwang Sportium Football Field
Referee: Tan Hai (China)

=== Women ===
==== Group D ====
Team	Pld	W	D	L	GF	GA	GD	Pts
Canada	3	3	0	0	6	0	+6	9
France	3	2	0	1	8	2	+6	6
United States	3	1	0	2	1	7	−6	3
South Africa	3	0	0	3	0	6	−6	0

==== Quarterfinals ====
8 July 2015
16:30

Canada	2–1	Czech Republic
Roy 51' (pen.); Gosselin 55'	Report	Svitková 90+3'

Boseong Public Stadium
Referee: Mai hoang Trang (Vietnam)

==== 1st–4th place ====
10 July 2015
11:00

Canada	0–4	Russia
	Report	Pantiukhina 32'; Terekhova 56', 65'; Cholovyaga 77'

Naju Public Stadium
Referee: Li Juan (People's Republic of China)

==== Bronze-medal match ====
12 July 2015
16:00

Japan	5–0	Canada

Naju Public Stadium

== Gymnastics ==
Canada qualified in both artistic gymnastics and rhythmic gymnastics.

== Volleyball ==
Canada qualified both a men's and a women's team.

=== Men ===
==== Group B ====
Pos	Team	Pld	W	L	Pts	SW	SL	SR	SPW	SPL	SPR	Qualification
1	Russia	4	4	0	12	12	0	MAX	301	230	1.309	Quarterfinals
2	Iran	4	3	1	8	9	6	1.500	350	298	1.174	Quarterfinals
3	Thailand	4	2	2	7	8	6	1.333	313	304	1.030	9th–16th place
4	Switzerland	4	1	3	3	4	9	0.444	267	311	0.859	9th–16th place
5	Canada	4	0	4	0	0	12	0.000	215	303	0.710	17th–20th place

=== Women ===
==== Group D ====
Pos	Team	Pld	W	L	Pts	SW	SL	SR	SPW	SPL	SPR	Qualification
1	Thailand	3	2	1	7	8	4	2.000	269	226	1.190	Quarterfinals
2	Canada	3	2	1	6	8	5	1.600	280	231	1.212	Quarterfinals
3	Turkey	3	2	1	5	7	5	1.400	275	214	1.285	
4	Zimbabwe	3	0	3	0	0	9	0.000	72	225	0.320	

===== Quarterfinals =====
Date	Time		Score		Set 1	Set 2	Set 3	Set 4	Set 5	Total	Report
8 Jul	20:00	Russia	3–0	Canada	25–20	25–17	25–19			75–56	Report

===== 5th–8th semifinals =====
Date	Time		Score		Set 1	Set 2	Set 3	Set 4	Set 5	Total	Report
9 Jul	20:30	Colombia	0–3	Canada	23–25	7–25	18–25			48–75	Report

==== 5th-place match ====
Date	Time		Score		Set 1	Set 2	Set 3	Set 4	Set 5	Total	Report
10 Jul	15:00	China	3–2	Canada	27–25	24–26	18–25	25–23	15–11	109–110	Report

== Water-polo ==
Canada qualified a women's team.

=== Group A ===
Team	Pld	W	D	L	GF	GA	GD	Pts
Canada	4	4	0	0	51	32	+19	8
Russia	4	3	0	1	63	40	+23	6
Japan	4	2	0	2	50	55	−5	4
China	4	1	0	3	34	50	−16	2
Serbia	4	0	0	4	36	57	−21	0

==== Quarterfinals ====
9 July; 15:30	Canada	7–5	Hungary	Yeomju Indoor Aquatics Center, Gwangju

==== Semifinals ====
11 July; 19:00	Canada	7–5	Italy	Yeomju Indoor Aquatics Center, Gwangju

==== Final ====
13 July; 20:00	Canada	3–6	Australia	Yeomju Indoor Aquatics Center, Gwangju
