= Chinese Taipei at the 2015 Summer Universiade =

- IOC code: TPE
- NOC: Chinese Taipei University Sports Federation (中華民國大專院校體育總會)
- Website: web2.ctusf.org.tw/index.php

in Gwangju
- Competitors: 136
- Medals Ranked 10th: Gold 6 Silver 12 Bronze 18 Total 36

Summer Universiade appearances (overview)
- 1989; 1991; 1993; 1995; 1997; 1999; 2001; 2003; 2005; 2007; 2009; 2011; 2013; 2015; 2017; 2019; 2021

Chinese Taipei participated at the 2015 Summer Universiade, in Gwangju, South Korea.

Taipei being the host city of the 2017 Summer Universiade, a Taiwanese segment was performed at the closing ceremony.

== Medals by sport ==
Sport	Grand Total			
Sport	1st place, gold medalist(s)	2nd place, silver medalist(s)	3rd place, bronze medalist(s)	Total
Archery	1	2	0	3
Athletics	0	1	1	2
Badminton	0	1	4	5
Baseball	1	0	0	1
Shooting	0	0	1	1
Table tennis	1	3	2	6
Taekwondo	1	3	7	11
Tennis	2	2	3	7
Total	6	12	18	36

== Medalists ==
Medal	Name	Sport	Event	Date
Gold	Tan Ya-ting; Hsiung Mei-chien; Lin Shih-chia	Archery	Women's Recurve Team	8 July
Gold	Lin Wan-ting	Taekwondo	Women's -46 kg	9 July
Gold	Lin Chu; Chang Hao-Wei; Chen Tzu-Hong; Wang Po-Jung; Chang Min-Hsun; Huang Yi-Chih; Lu Yen-Ching; Wang Yu-Pu; Tsai Wei-Fan; Lin Tzu-Wei; Huang Tzu-Peng; Chen Yi-Hung; Yang Tai-Chun; Wu Sung-Hsun; Cheng Kai-Wen; Lee Tsung-Hsien; Sung Chia-Hao; Lin Chih-Hsien; Hsu Kai-Hsiang; Tsao Yu-Ning; Peng Shih-Ying; Su Chih-Chieh	Baseball	Men's Baseball	11 July
Gold	Chiang Hung-chieh; Huang Sheng-sheng	Table tennis	Men's Doubles	12 July
Gold	Chang Kai-chen	Tennis	Women's Singles	12 July
Gold	Chang Kai-chen; Hsu Chieh-yu; Hsieh Shu-ying; Lee Ya-hsuan	Tennis	Women's Team	12 July
Silver	Wei Chun-heng; Yu Guan-lin; Wang Hou-chieh	Archery	Men's Recurve Team	8 July
Silver	Tan Ya-ting; Wei Chun-heng	Archery	Mixed Recurve Team	8 July
Silver	Chen Hsiang-ting; Chen Yi-hsuan; Lee Ying-hsian	Taekwondo	Women's Team Poomsae	8 July
Silver	Huang Shih-Feng	Athletics	Men's Javelin Throw	10 July
Silver	Chen Szu-yu; Cheng Hsien-tzu; Cheng I-ching; Lee I-chen; Lin Chia-hui	Table tennis	Women's Team	10 July
Silver	Chuang Chia-chia	Taekwondo	Women's -67 kg	10 July
Silver	Chen Szu-yu; Chiang Hung-chieh	Table tennis	Mixed Doubles	11 July
Silver	Hsu Chieh-yu; Lee Ya-hsuan	Tennis	Women's Doubles	11 July
Silver	Chiang Kai-Hsin; Lu Ching-Yao	Badminton	Mixed Doubles	12 July
Silver	Cheng I-ching; Lee I-chen	Table tennis	Women's Doubles	12 July
Silver	Huang Yun-wen	Taekwondo	Women's -53 kg	12 July
Silver	Lee Hsin-han; Peng Hsien-yin; Huang Liang-chi; Yang Tsung-hua	Tennis	Men's Team	12 July
Bronze	Liao Wen-Hsuan	Taekwondo	Women's Individual Poomsae	7 July
Bronze	Wu Chia-ying	Shooting	Women's 10m Air Pistol	8 July
Bronze	Chang Wei-chieh; Chuang Chun-kai; Lu Cheng-lung	Taekwondo	Men's Team Poomsae	8 July
Bronze	Chen Yi-hsuan; Li Cheng-gang	Taekwondo	Mixed Pair Poomsae	8 July
Bronze	Chen Chien-an; Chiang Hung-chieh; Huang Sheng-sheng; Liao Cheng-ting; Yang Heng-wei	Table tennis	Men's Team	9 July
Bronze	Hsiang Chun-Hsien	Athletics	Men's High Jump	10 July
Bronze	Liu Wei-Ting	Taekwondo	Men's -80 kg	10 July
Bronze	Wu Shao-Yu	Taekwondo	Women's -49 kg	10 July
Bronze	Lee Hsin-han; Peng Hsien-yin	Tennis	Men's Doubles	10 July
Bronze	Chen Chien-an; Cheng I-ching	Table tennis	Mixed Doubles	11 July
Bronze	Yang Tsung-hua	Tennis	Men's Singles	11 July
Bronze	Chang Kai-chen; Peng Hsien-yin	Tennis	Mixed Doubles	11 July
Bronze	Hsu Jen-hao	Badminton	Men's Singles	12 July
Bronze	Chou Tien-chen	Badminton	Men's Singles	12 July
Bronze	Tseng Min-Hao; Hsieh Pei-Chen	Badminton	Mixed Doubles	12 July
Bronze	Tai Tzu-ying	Badminton	Women's Singles	12 July
Bronze	Huang Cheng-Ching	Taekwondo	Men's -63 kg	12 July
Bronze	Chuang Chia-chia; Huang Kuan-Chi; Huang Yun-wen; Lin Yi-Ching	Taekwondo	Women's Team Kyorugi	13 July
