= Malaysia at the 2015 Summer Universiade =

- IOC code: MAS
- National federation: Malaysian University Sports Council
- Website: https://www.masum.org.my/

in Gwangju, South Korea 3 – 14 July 2015
- Competitors: 107 in 14 sports
- Flag bearer: Fatin Nurfatehah Mat Salleh
- Medals Ranked 58th: Gold 0 Silver 0 Bronze 2 Total 2

Summer Universiade appearances (overview)
- 1985; 1987; 1989; 1991; 1993; 1995; 1997; 1999; 2001; 2003; 2005; 2007; 2009; 2011; 2013; 2015; 2017; 2019; 2021

Malaysia participated at the 2015 Summer Universiade in Gwangju, South Korea.

== Medal summary ==
=== Medal by sports ===
| Sport | 1st place, gold medalist(s) | 2nd place, silver medalist(s) | 3rd place, bronze medalist(s) | Total |
|---|---|---|---|---|
| Badminton | 0 | 0 | 2 | 2 |
| Total | 0 | 0 | 2 | 2 |

=== Medalists ===
| Medal | Name | Sport | Event | Date |
|---|---|---|---|---|
| Bronze | Ng Chiew Yen; Erica Khoo Pei Shan; Kuldip Singh Jagdish Singh Dhanoa; Juan Shen Low; Lydia Cheah Yi Yli; Muhammad Arif Abdul Latif; Muhammad Syawal Ismail; Vountus Indra Mawan; Ti Wei Chyi; Zulfadli Zulkiffli; Sannatasah Saniru; Sylvia Kavita | Badminton | Mixed Team | 7 July |
| Bronze | Juan Shen Low; Muhammad Arif Abdul Latif | Badminton | Men's Doubles | 12 July |
