= United States at the 2015 Summer Universiade =

- IOC code: USA
- NOC: United States Olympic Committee
- Website: https://www.teamusa.com

in Gwangju, South Korea 3 – 14 July 2015
- Competitors: 375 in 20 sports
- Medals Ranked 5th: Gold 20 Silver 15 Bronze 19 Total 54

Summer Universiade appearances (overview)
- 1965; 1967; 1970; 1973; 1975; 1977; 1979; 1981; 1983; 1985; 1987; 1989; 1991; 1993; 1995; 1997; 1999; 2001; 2003; 2005; 2007; 2009; 2011; 2013; 2015; 2017; 2019; 2021; 2025; 2027

United States participated at the 2015 Summer Universiade in Gwangju, South Korea. The men's basketball team was represented by the Kansas Jayhawks.

== Medal summary ==
=== Medal by sports ===
Medals by sport
| Sport | 1st place, gold medalist(s) | 2nd place, silver medalist(s) | 3rd place, bronze medalist(s) | Total |
|---|---|---|---|---|
| Archery | 0 | 1 | 0 | 1 |
| Athletics | 1 | 4 | 1 | 6 |
| Gymnastics-Artistic | 1 | 0 | 2 | 3 |
| Basketball | 2 | 0 | 0 | 2 |
| Diving | 0 | 0 | 2 | 2 |
| Fencing | 0 | 0 | 2 | 2 |
| Golf | 0 | 0 | 1 | 1 |
| Rowing | 1 | 0 | 0 | 1 |
| Swimming | 15 | 10 | 9 | 34 |
| Taekwondo | 0 | 0 | 1 | 1 |
| Water polo | 0 | 0 | 1 | 1 |
| Total | 20 | 15 | 19 | 54 |

=== Medalists ===
| Medal | Name | Sport | Event | Date |

=== Participants ===
| Result | Name | Sport | Event | Date |

== Basketball ==
=== Men's tournament ===
Group play

| Team | Pld | W | L | PF | PA | PD | Pts |
|---|---|---|---|---|---|---|---|
| Canada | 5 | 5 | 0 | 494 | 336 | +158 | 10 |
| Australia | 5 | 4 | 1 | 462 | 329 | +133 | 9 |
| United States | 5 | 3 | 2 | 488 | 351 | +137 | 8 |
| Czech Republic | 5 | 2 | 3 | 331 | 385 | −54 | 7 |
| Sweden | 5 | 1 | 4 | 329 | 371 | −42 | 6 |
| United Arab Emirates | 5 | 0 | 5 | 255 | 587 | −332 | 5 |

7 July 2013
18:30

Report

| United States | 140–46 | United Arab Emirates |
Scoring by quarter: 35–16, 34–7, 31–11, 40–12

Basket Hall

8 July 2013
13:00

Report

| United States | 96–53 | Czech Republic |
Scoring by quarter: 20–9, 21–13, 25–16, 30–15

Basket Hall

10 July 2013
21:00

Report

| United States | 83–65 | Sweden |
Scoring by quarter: 18–17, 19–10, 27–17, 19–21

Basket Hall

11 July 2013
18:30

Report

| United States | 84–93 | Australia |
Scoring by quarter: 19–20, 24–20, 21–19, 20–34

Basket Hall

12 July 2013
13:00

Report

| Canada | 94–85 | United States |
Scoring by quarter: 18–17, 28–19, 23–22, 25–27

Basket Hall

=== Women Tournament ===
Group play

| Team | Pld | W | L | PF | PA | PD | Pts |
|---|---|---|---|---|---|---|---|
| United States | 3 | 3 | 0 | 326 | 168 | +158 | 6 |
| Czech Republic | 3 | 2 | 1 | 206 | 208 | −2 | 5 |
| Brazil | 3 | 1 | 2 | 216 | 242 | −26 | 4 |
| Mali | 3 | 0 | 3 | 127 | 257 | −130 | 3 |

8 July 2013
20:30

Report

| United States | 120–32 | Mali |
Scoring by quarter: 28–12, 29–8, 37–8, 26–4

Olymp Sport Hall

9 July 2013
20:30

Report

| United States | 101–61 | Czech Republic |
Scoring by quarter: 21–11, 27–16, 30–14, 23–20

Miras Sports Complex

10 July 2013
12:30

Report

| United States | 105–75 | Brazil |
Scoring by quarter: 36–16, 20–16, 26–19, 23–24

Miras Sports Complex

12 July 2013
10:30

Report

| United States | 103–72 | Sweden |
Scoring by quarter: 26–24, 25–16, 24–16, 28–16

Basket Hall

13 July 2013
21:00

Report

| United States | 79–78 | Australia |
Scoring by quarter: 13–20, 19–13, 30–16, 17–29

Basket Hall

Gold medal match

15 July 2013
21:30

Report

| United States | 90–71 | Russia |
Scoring by quarter: 22–13, 19–14, 27–20, 22–24
| Pts: Hartley 17; Rebs: Hooper 9 Asts: Massengale 5 | | Pts: Vieru 13; Rebs: Vieru 9 Asts: Logunova 4 |

Basket Hall
Attendance: 4,000
Referees: Ivana Ivanovic (SRB), Wang Zebo (CHN), Toni Caldwell (AUS)

== Water polo ==
=== Men Tournament ===
Group play

| Team | Pld | W | D | L | GF | GA | GD | Pts |
|---|---|---|---|---|---|---|---|---|
| Hungary | 6 | 5 | 1 | 0 | 67 | 36 | +31 | 11 |
| Australia | 6 | 4 | 1 | 1 | 62 | 39 | +23 | 9 |
| France | 6 | 4 | 0 | 2 | 64 | 62 | +2 | 8 |
| Italy | 6 | 3 | 0 | 3 | 66 | 49 | +17 | 6 |
| Netherlands | 6 | 3 | 0 | 3 | 77 | 53 | +24 | 6 |
| Brazil | 6 | 1 | 0 | 5 | 41 | 78 | -37 | 2 |
| South Korea | 6 | 0 | 0 | 6 | 31 | 91 | -60 | 0 |

| 2 July; 17:00 | Report | United States | 13–12 | Japan | Yeomju Indoor Aquatics Center, Gwangju; Referees: Fabio Brasiliano (ITA); Zsolt Marjay (HUN) |
| 2 July; 17:00 | Report | Score by quarters: 2–3, 4–2, 4–3, 3–4 | | | Yeomju Indoor Aquatics Center, Gwangju; Referees: Fabio Brasiliano (ITA); Zsolt Marjay (HUN) |
| 2 July; 17:00 | Report | Fellner 4 | Goals | Iida 3 | Yeomju Indoor Aquatics Center, Gwangju; Referees: Fabio Brasiliano (ITA); Zsolt Marjay (HUN) |

| 4 July; 14:00 | Report | Turkey | 8–12 | United States | Yeomju Indoor Aquatics Center, Gwangju; Referees: Nikolaos Boudramis (GRE); Erwin Schapers (NED) |
| 4 July; 14:00 | Report | Score by quarters: 3–3, 1–2, 2–5, 2–2 | | | Yeomju Indoor Aquatics Center, Gwangju; Referees: Nikolaos Boudramis (GRE); Erwin Schapers (NED) |
| 4 July; 14:00 | Report | Cagatay 3 | Goals | Roberts, Fellner 3 | Yeomju Indoor Aquatics Center, Gwangju; Referees: Nikolaos Boudramis (GRE); Erwin Schapers (NED) |

| 6 July; 15:30 | Report | United States | 6–9 | Russia | Yeomju Indoor Aquatics Center, Gwangju; Referees: Dragan Stampalija (CRO); Fabio Brasiliano (ITA) |
| 6 July; 15:30 | Report | Score by quarters: 2-2, 2-2, 2-1, 0-4 | | | Yeomju Indoor Aquatics Center, Gwangju; Referees: Dragan Stampalija (CRO); Fabio Brasiliano (ITA) |
| 6 July; 15:30 | Report | Roberts 2 | Goals | Balakirev 2 | Yeomju Indoor Aquatics Center, Gwangju; Referees: Dragan Stampalija (CRO); Fabio Brasiliano (ITA) |

| 10 July; 12:30 | Report | United States | 12–8 | China | Yeomju Indoor Aquatics Center, Gwangju; Referees: Zsolt Marjay (HUN); Erwin Schapers (NED) |
| 10 July; 12:30 | Report | Score by quarters: 3-2, 0-0, 6-4, 3-2 | | | Yeomju Indoor Aquatics Center, Gwangju; Referees: Zsolt Marjay (HUN); Erwin Schapers (NED) |
| 10 July; 12:30 | Report | Irving 3 | Goals | Hu, Chen 2 | Yeomju Indoor Aquatics Center, Gwangju; Referees: Zsolt Marjay (HUN); Erwin Schapers (NED) |

Quarter finals

| 11 July; 15:30 | France | 9–11 | United States | Yeomju Indoor Aquatics Center, Gwangju |

Semi-finals

| 11 July; 15:30 | France | 9–11 | United States | Yeomju Indoor Aquatics Center, Gwangju |

3rd place match

| 14 July; 12:00 | Serbia | 4–5 | United States | Yeomju Indoor Aquatics Center, Gwangju |
