= Japan at the 2015 Summer Universiade =

- IOC code: JPN
- NOC: Japanese Olympic Committee
- Website: www.joc.or.jp/english/ (in English)

in Gwangju, South Korea 3 – 14 July 2015
- Competitors: 350 in 20 sports
- Medals Ranked 4th: Gold 25 Silver 25 Bronze 35 Total 85

Summer Universiade appearances (overview)
- 1959; 1961; 1963; 1965; 1967; 1970; 1973; 1975; 1977; 1979; 1981; 1983; 1985; 1987; 1989; 1991; 1993; 1995; 1997; 1999; 2001; 2003; 2005; 2007; 2009; 2011; 2013; 2015; 2017; 2019; 2021; 2025; 2027

Japan participated at the 2015 Summer Universiade in Gwangju, South Korea.

== Medal summary ==
=== Medal by Sports ===
Medals by sport
Sport	1st place, gold medalist(s)	2nd place, silver medalist(s)	3rd place, bronze medalist(s)	Total
Athletics	4	3	5	12
Badminton	0	0	2	2
Baseball	1	0	0	1
Gymnastics	3	8	4	15
Diving	0	0	1	1
Football	0	0	2	2
Golf	2	2	0	4
Judo	7	2	6	15
Rowing	2	0	1	3
Swimming	5	7	9	21
Table tennis	1	3	2	6
Tennis	0	0	2	2
Volleyball	0	0	1	1
Total	25	25	35	85

=== Medalists ===
Medal	Name	Sport	Event	Date
Gold	Hisayoshi Harasawa	Judo	Men's +100 kg	4 July
Gold	Sarah Asahina	Judo	Women's +78 kg	4 July
Gold	Chihiro Yoshioka; Kaito Imabayashi; Naoto Hayasaka; Shogo Nonomura; Yuya Kamoto	Gymnastics	Men's Team	5 July
Gold	Megumi Tsugane	Judo	Women's -63 kg	5 July
Gold	Junya Hasegawa	Swimming	Men's 100m Backstroke	5 July
Gold	Mako Uchio	Judo	Women's -52 kg	6 July
Gold	Shota Araki; Takumi Shiga; Kakeru Sato; Tsugoto Hayashi	Rowing	Men's Lightweight Coxless Four	6 July
Gold	Ayami Oishi; Chiaki Tomita	Rowing	Women's Lightweight Double Sculls	6 July
Gold	Mina Matsushima	Swimming	Women's 100m Breaststroke	6 July
Gold	Naoto Hayasaka	Gymnastics	Men's Floor Exercise	7 July
Gold	Yu Minobe	Gymnastics	Women's Beam	7 July
Gold	Katsuma Ueda	Judo	Men's Open	7 July
Gold	Junya Hasegawa	Swimming	Men's 50m Backstroke	7 July
Gold	Ryutaro Goto; Kenya Kohara; Kenta Nagasawa; Yuma Oshima; Sho Tateyama; Katsuma Ueda; Yuji Yamamoto	Judo	Men's Team	8 July
Gold	Sarah Asahina; Ayumi Hori; Kazuki Osanai; Funa Tonaki; Megumi Tsugane; Mako Uchio; Anzu Yamamoto; Sara Yamamoto	Judo	Women's Team	8 July
Gold	Keiko Fukudome	Swimming	Women's 200m Breaststroke	8 July
Gold	Ayatsugu Hirai	Swimming	Men's 1500m Freestyle	9 July
Gold	Tatsuhiro Shibata; Shoji Kitamura; Yudai Fujioka; Ryota Shimoishi; Eigoro Mogi; Toshitake Yokoo; Takuya Sato; Shun Takayama; Ryo Masuzawa; Kenta Uehara; Seishirō Sakamoto; Yuya Yanagi; Haruhiro Hamaguchi; Yuki Yoshida; Rei Takahashi; Kazumoto Iguchi; Seigi Tanaka; Shingo Usami; Seigo Yada; Masataka Yoshida; Keisuke Sawada; Tatsuya Yamaashi	Baseball	Men's Baseball	11 July
Gold	Kazuki Higa	Golf	Men's Individual	11 July
Gold	Kazuki Higa; Kenta Konishi; Taihei Sato	Golf	Men's Team	11 July
Gold	Kazuma Oseto; Kotaro Taniguchi; Takuya Nagata; Tatsuro Suwa; Yuki Koike	Athletics	Men's 4x100m Relay	12 July
Gold	Yusuke Ogura	Athletics	Men's Half Marathon	12 July
Gold	Yusuke Ogura; Tadashi Isshiki; Yuta Takahashi; Naoki Kudo	Athletics	Men's Half Marathon Team	12 July
Gold	Nanako Kanno; Ayumi Uehara; Maki Izumida; Sakurako Fukuuchi	Athletics	Women's Half Marathon Team	12 July
Gold	Masataka Morizono	Table tennis	Men's Singles	13 July
Silver	Reo Sakata; Kosuke Matsui; Takumi Komatsu; Toru Maruyama	Swimming	Men's 4x100m Freestyle Relay	4 July
Silver	Yui Yamane; Yasuko Miyamoto; Aya Sato; Mari Sumiyoshi	Swimming	Women's 4x100m Freestyle Relay	4 July
Silver	Asuka Teramoto; Natsumi Sasada; Sakura Yumoto; Wakana Inoue; Yu Minobe	Gymnastics	Women's Team	5 July
Silver	Kazuki Osanai	Judo	Women's -70 kg	5 July
Silver	Shogo Nonomura	Gymnastics	Men's Individual All-Around	6 July
Silver	Asuka Teramoto	Gymnastics	Women's Individual All-Around	6 July
Silver	Shogo Nonomura	Gymnastics	Men's Horizontal Bar	7 July
Silver	Yuya Kamoto	Gymnastics	Men's Parallel Bars	7 July
Silver	Naoto Hayasaka	Gymnastics	Men's Pommel Horse	7 July
Silver	Asuka Teramoto	Gymnastics	Women's Uneven Bars	7 July
Silver	Yuma Oshima	Judo	Men's -60 kg	7 July
Silver	Kazuki Kohinata	Swimming	Men's 200m Breaststroke	7 July
Silver	Yuya Yajima	Swimming	Men's 200m Butterfly	7 July
Silver	Reona Aoki	Swimming	Women's 200m Breaststroke	8 July
Silver	Keita Sunama	Swimming	Men's 200m Backstroke	9 July
Silver	Miki Takahashi; Miku Kanasashi; Rino Hosoda; Yui Yamane	Swimming	Women's 4x100m Medley Relay	10 July
Silver	Asuka Machi; Jin Ueda; Masataka Morizono; Yuya Oshima; Masaki Yoshida	Table tennis	Men's Team	10 July
Silver	Shina Kanazawa	Golf	Women's Individual	11 July
Silver	Shina Kanazawa; Riko Inoue; Nene Tanno	Golf	Women's Team	11 July
Silver	Julian Walsh; Kazuma Oseto; Kentaro Sato; Nobuya Kato; Takamasa Kitagawa	Athletics	Men's 4x400m Relay	12 July
Silver	Tadashi Isshiki	Athletics	Men's Half Marathon	12 July
Silver	Nanako Kanno	Athletics	Women's Half Marathon	12 July
Silver	Masataka Morizono; Yuya Oshima	Table tennis	Men's Doubles	12 July
Silver	Asuka Ono; Ayano Sato; Konatsu Arai; Mana Tsutsumi; Minori Shindo; Rina Miura	Gymnastics	Rhythmic Group – 6 clubs, 2 hoops	13 July
Silver	Yuya Oshima	Table tennis	Men's Singles	13 July
Bronze	Mai Nakagawa	Diving	Women's 10 metre platform	5 July
Bronze	Kenya Kohara	Judo	Men's -81 kg	5 July
Bronze	Kenta Nagasawa	Judo	Men's -90 kg	5 July
Bronze	Ayatsugu Hirai	Swimming	Men's 800m Freestyle	5 July
Bronze	Yuka Kawayoke	Swimming	Women's 200m Backstroke	5 July
Bronze	Natsumi Sasada	Gymnastics	Women's Individual All-Around	6 July
Bronze	Yuji Yamamoto	Judo	Men's -73 kg	6 July
Bronze	Anzu Yamamoto	Judo	Women's -57 kg	6 July
Bronze	Keita Sunama	Swimming	Men's 200m Individual Medley	6 July
Bronze	Shogo Nonomura	Gymnastics	Men's Floor Exercise	7 July
Bronze	Yuya Kamoto	Gymnastics	Men's Horizontal Bar	7 July
Bronze	Chihiro Yoshioka	Gymnastics	Men's Parallel Bars	7 July
Bronze	Funa Tonaki	Judo	Women's -48 kg	7 July
Bronze	Sara Yamamoto	Judo	Women's Open	7 July
Bronze	Yoshihiro Otsuka; Atsushi Nagata	Rowing	Men's Lightweight Double Sculls	7 July
Bronze	Masayuki Umemoto	Swimming	Men's 200m Butterfly	7 July
Bronze	Aya Takano; Yui Yamane; Asami Chida; Yasuko Miyamoto	Swimming	Women's 4x200m Freestyle Relay	7 July
Bronze	Keisuke Nakatani	Athletics	Men's 10000m	9 July
Bronze	Daisuke Matsunaga	Athletics	Men's 20 km Walk	9 July
Bronze	Kohei Yamamoto	Swimming	Men's 1500m Freestyle	9 July
Bronze	Katsuhiro Matsumoto; Takumi Komatsu; Naito Ehara; Reo Sakata	Swimming	Men's 4x200m Freestyle Relay	9 July
Bronze	Eriko Kitaoka; Misako Niwa; Rei Yamamoto; Rika Suzuki; Yuki Shoji	Table tennis	Women's Team	9 July
Bronze	Keita Sunama	Swimming	Men's 400m Individual Medley	10 July
Bronze	Junya Hasegawa; Kazuki Kohinata; Masayuki Umemoto; Toru Maruyama	Swimming	Men's 4x100m Medley Relay	10 July
Bronze	Shintaro Imai; Kaito Uesugi	Tennis	Men's Doubles	10 July
Bronze	Erina Hayashi; Aiko Yoshitomi	Tennis	Women's Doubles	10 July
Bronze	Genta Masuno	Athletics	Men's 110m Hurdles	11 July
Bronze	Naoko Yataka; Misaki Tanaka; Mai Shimizu; Kiyora Obikawa; Nao Muranaga; Yuka Imamura; Momoka Oda; Kasumi Nakaya; Misaki Yamauchi; Manami Kojima; Arisa Inoue; Tomomi Ishibashi	Volleyball	Women	11 July
Bronze	Yuta Takahashi	Athletics	Men's Half Marathon	12 July
Bronze	Ayumi Uehara	Athletics	Women's Half Marathon	12 July
Bronze	Miki Kashihara; Miyuki Kato	Badminton	Women's Doubles	12 July
Bronze	Shiho Tanaka	Badminton	Women's Singles	12 July
Bronze	Midori Arai; Hikari Takagi; Chisa Okugawa; Kaho Urata; Kanae Hayashi; Nao Kawahara; Koko Kaga; Mana Mihashi; Ai Yokohama; Yuka Honda; Shoko Uemura; Miyuki Takahashi; Marin Hamamoto; Manami Yoshitake; Ayane Takatsuka; Anna Yamamori; Rena Koizumi; Manami Sunaga; Hikari Nagashima; Nene Inoue	Football	Women's Football	12 July
Bronze	Eriko Kitaoka; Yuki Shoji	Table tennis	Women's doubles	12 July
Bronze	Haruki Fukushima; Masato Yuzawa; Daiki Hagima; Daichi Tagami; Ikki Arai; Ryo Takahashi; Seigo Kobayashi; Ryuji Izumi; Ryuji Sawakami; Tatsuya Hasegawa; Yoshiki Oka; Sei Muroya; Hiroto Goya; Yoshiki Matsushita; Yasuki Kimoto; Masayuki Okuyama; Go Hayama; Hayate Hachikubo; Takuya Shigehiro; Daiya Maekawa	Football	Men's Football	13 July
