= South Korea at the 2015 Summer Universiade =

- IOC code: KOR
- NOC: Korean Olympic Committee
- Website: http://www.sports.or.kr/

in Gwangju, South Korea 3 – 14 July 2015
- Competitors: 379 in 20 sports
- Medals Ranked 1st: Gold 47 Silver 32 Bronze 29 Total 108

Summer Universiade appearances (overview)
- 1959; 1961; 1963; 1965; 1967; 1970; 1973; 1975; 1977; 1979; 1981; 1983; 1985; 1987; 1989; 1991; 1993; 1995; 1997; 1999; 2001; 2003; 2005; 2007; 2009; 2011; 2013; 2015; 2017; 2019; 2021

South Korea participated at the 2015 Summer Universiade in Gwangju, South Korea.

== Medal summary ==
=== Medal by sports ===
Medals by sport
Sport	1st place, gold medalist(s)	2nd place, silver medalist(s)	3rd place, bronze medalist(s)	Total
Archery	8	4	2	14
Badminton	6	1	2	9
Baseball	0	0	1	1
Gymnastics	3	3	1	7
Diving	0	6	3	9
Fencing	2	2	4	8
Football	0	1	0	1
Golf	2	0	1	3
Handball	0	1	0	1
Judo	8	5	2	15
Shooting	6	3	4	13
Swimming	0	1	0	1
Table tennis	1	0	5	6
Taekwondo	8	4	3	15
Tennis	3	1	1	5
Total	47	32	29	108

=== Medalists ===
Medal	Name	Sport	Event	Date
