= List of Universiade medalists in athletics (men) =

This is the complete list of men's Universiade medalists in athletics from 1959 to 2019.

== Events ==
=== 100m ===
Games	Gold		Silver		Bronze	
1959	Livio Berruti (ITA)	10.5	Jean-Claude Penez (FRA)	10.8	Romain Poté (BEL)	10.8
1961	Enrique Figuerola (CUB)	10.38	Berwyn Jones (GBR)	10.59	László Mihályfi (HUN)	10.65
1963	Enrique Figuerola (CUB)	10.34	Edvin Ozolin (URS)	10.52	Livio Berruti (ITA)	10.56
1965	Hideo Iijima (JPN)	10.1	George Anderson (USA)	10.1	Harry Jerome (CAN)	10.2
1967	Gaoussou Koné (CIV)	10.4	Tommie Smith (USA)	10.5	Ippolito Giani (ITA)	10.7
1970	Siegfried Schenke (GDR)	10.5	Jim Green (USA)	10.5	Jean-Louis Ravelomanantsoa (MAD)	10.5
1973	Juris Silovs (URS)	10.37	Silvio Leonard (CUB)	10.43	Pietro Mennea (ITA)	10.48
1975	Pietro Mennea (ITA)	10.28 GR	Charles Hopkins (USA)	10.47	Toma Petrescu (ROM)	10.66
1977	Silvio Leonard (CUB)	10.08	Petar Petrov (BUL)	10.19	Osvaldo Lara (CUB)	10.31
1979	Mike Roberson (USA)	10.19	Leszek Dunecki (POL)	10.30	Ainsley Bennett (GBR)	10.38
1981	Mel Lattany (USA)	10.18	Calvin Smith (USA)	10.26	Ernest Obeng (GHA)	10.37
1983	Chidi Imoh (NGR)	10.33	Desai Williams (CAN)	10.37	Sam Graddy (USA)	10.42
1985	Chidi Imoh (NGR)	10.22	Andrés Simón (CUB)	10.28	Lee McNeill (USA)	10.33
1987	Lee McRae (USA)	10.07	Brian Cooper (USA)	10.21	Bruno Marie-Rose (FRA)	10.25
1989	Andre Cason (USA)	10.29	Olapade Adeniken (NGR)	10.35	Joel Isasi (CUB)	10.41
1991	Michael Bates (USA)	10.17	Boris Goins (USA)	10.34	Steve Gookey (GBR)	10.39
1993	Daniel Effiong (NGR)	10.07w	Sam Jefferson (USA)	10.13w	Glenroy Gilbert (CAN)	10.14w
1995	David Oaks (USA)	10.28	Obadele Thompson (BAR)	10.34	Terrance Bowen (USA)	10.36
1997	Vincent Henderson (USA)	10.22	Aleksandr Porkhomovskiy (RUS)	10.39	Jonathan Carter (USA)	10.42
1999	André Domingos (BRA)	10.34	John Capel (USA)	10.35	Matthew Quinn (RSA)	10.42
2001	Marcus Brunson (USA)	10.15	Gennadiy Chernovol (KAZ)	10.29	Chris Lambert (GBR)	10.38
2003	Chris Lambert; Great Britain	10.44	Leigh Julius; South Africa	10.50	Dejan Vojnović; Croatia	10.58
2005	Hu Kai; China	10.30	Andrey Yepishin; Russia	10.43	Sandro Viana; Brazil	10.49
2007	Simeon Williamson (GBR)	10.22	Zhang Peimeng (CHN)	10.30	Neville Wright (CAN)	10.37
2009	Rolando Palacios; Honduras	10.30	Amr Seoud; Egypt	10.31	Masashi Eriguchi; Japan	10.33
2011	Jacques Harvey; Jamaica	10.14	Rytis Sakalauskas; Lithuania	10.14; NR	Su Bingtian; China	10.27
2013	Anaso Jobodwana; South Africa	10.10	Ryota Yamagata; Japan	10.21	Wilfried Koffi Hua; Ivory Coast	10.21
2015	Akani Simbine; South Africa	9.97 UR	Kemarley Brown; Jamaica	10.12	Ramil Guliyev; Turkey	10.16
2017	Yang Chun-han; Chinese Taipei	10.22	Thando Roto; South Africa	10.24	Cameron Burrell; United States	10.27
2019	Paulo André Camilo; Brazil	10.09	Chederick van Wyk; South Africa	10.23	Rodrigo do Nascimento; Brazil	10.32

=== 200m ===
Games	Gold		Silver		Bronze	
1959	Livio Berruti (ITA)	20.9	Nikolaos Georgopoulos (GRE)	21.6	Fritz Helfrich (FRG)	21.7
1961	László Mihályfi (HUN)	21.27	Brian Smouha (GBR)	21.40	Brian Anson (GBR)	21.51
1963	Edvin Ozolin (URS)	21.44	Dick Steane (GBR)	21.55	Livio Berruti (ITA)	21.60
1965	Edvin Ozolin (URS)	21.0w	George Anderson (USA)	21.0w	Menzies Campbell (GBR)	21.2w
1967	Tommie Smith (USA)	20.7	Menzies Campbell (GBR)	21.2	Ippolito Giani (ITA)	21.3
1970	Martin Reynolds (GBR)	21.0	Siegfried Schenke (GDR)	21.0	Jim Green (USA)	21.1
1973	Pietro Mennea (ITA)	20.56	Chris Monk (GBR)	20.70	Wardell Gilbreath (USA)	20.80
1975	Pietro Mennea (ITA)	20.28	Robert Martin (CAN)	21.06	Thorsten Johansson (SWE)	21.15
1977	Clancy Edwards (USA)	20.46	Silvio Leonard (CUB)	20.64	William Snoddy (USA)	21.17
1979	Pietro Mennea (ITA)	19.72 WR	Leszek Dunecki (POL)	20.24	Ainsley Bennett (GBR)	20.42
1981	Yuriy Naumenko (URS)	20.79	István Nagy (HUN)	20.83	Georges Kablan Degnan (CIV)	20.97
1983	Innocent Egbunike (NGR)	20.42	Elliott Quow (USA)	20.46	Bernie Jackson (USA)	20.57
1985	Leandro Peñalver (CUB)	20.57	Atlee Mahorn (CAN)	20.65	Jang Jae-keun (KOR)	20.78
1987	Wallace Spearmon Sr. (USA)	20.42	Floyd Heard (USA)	20.44	Edgardo Guilbe (PUR)	20.92
1989	Robson Caetano (BRA)	20.33w	Félix Stevens (CUB)	20.58w	Kevin Braunskill (USA)	20.62w
1991	Jon Drummond (USA)	20.58	Daniel Phillip (NGR)	20.69	Patrick Stevens (BEL)	20.99
1993	Bryan Bridgewater (USA)	20.14w	Chris Nelloms (USA)	20.17w	Iván García (CUB)	20.55w
1995	Anthuan Maybank (USA)	20.46	David Dopek (USA)	20.47	Thomas Sbokos (GRE)	20.75
1997	Gentry Bradley (USA)	20.48	Tony Wheeler (USA)	20.64	Anninos Marcoullides (CYP)	20.72
1999	Coby Miller (USA)	20.32	Patrick van Balkom (NED)	20.57	Christos Magos (GRE)	20.70
2001	Marcin Urbaś (POL)	20.56	Gennadiy Chernovol (KAZ)	20.57	Corné du Plessis (RSA)	20.58
2003	Leigh Julius; South Africa	20.49	Paul Hession; Ireland	20.89	Jiří Vojtík; Czech Republic	21.03
2005	Leigh Julius; South Africa	20.56	Shinji Takahira; Japan	20.93	Paul Hession; Ireland	21.02
2007	Amr Seoud (EGY)	20.74 PB	Leigh Julius (RSA)	20.96	Tomoya Kamiyama (JPN)	20.97
2009	Ramil Guliyev; Azerbaijan	20.04 NR	Amr Seoud; Egypt	20.52	Thuso Mpuang; South Africa	20.69
2011	Rasheed Dwyer; Jamaica	20.20; PB	Thuso Mpuang; South Africa	20.59	Not awarded	
2011	Rasheed Dwyer; Jamaica	20.20; PB	Jason Young; Jamaica	20.59	Not awarded	
2013	Anaso Jobodwana; South Africa	20.00	Rasheed Dwyer; Jamaica	20.23	Shōta Iizuka; Japan	20.33
2015	Wilfried Koffi Hua; Ivory Coast	20.41 SB	Bryce Robinson; United States	20.51	Ramil Guliyev; Turkey	20.59 SB
2017	Jeffrey John; France	20.93	James Linde; Canada	20.96	Ján Volko; Slovakia	20.99
2019	Paulo André Camilo; Brazil	20.28	Chederick van Wyk; South Africa	20.44	Marcus Lawler; Ireland	20.55

=== 400m ===
Games	Gold		Silver		Bronze	
1959	Viktor Šnajder (YUG)	47.5	Walter Oberste (FRG)	47.9	Otto Klappert (FRG)	47.9
1961	Josef Trousil (TCH)	47.51	Jacques Pennewaert (BEL)	48.06	Otto Grasshoff (FRG)	48.53
1963	Adrian Metcalfe (GBR)	46.75	Hans-Joachim Reske (FRG)	46.92	Jacques Pennewaert (BEL)	47.02
1965	Sergio Bello (ITA)	46.8	Fred van Herpen (NED)	46.9	Lynn Saunders (USA)	47.2
1967	Ingo Röper (FRG)	46.0	Helmar Müller (FRG)	46.6	Sergio Bello (ITA)	46.7
1970	Tom Ulan (USA)	45.9	Martin Jellinghaus (FRG)	46.2	Jacques Carette (FRA)	46.3
1973	Alberto Juantorena (CUB)	45.36	Semyon Kocher (URS)	46.32	David Jenkins (GBR)	46.39
1975	Jerzy Pietrzyk (POL)	46.26	Roger Jenkins (GBR)	46.55	Bryan Saunders (CAN)	46.83
1977	Fons Brydenbach (BEL)	45.18	Willie Smith (USA)	45.34	Ryszard Podlas (POL)	45.36
1979	Harald Schmid (FRG)	44.98	Franz-Peter Hofmeister (FRG)	45.12	Walter McCoy (USA)	45.90
1981	Cliff Wiley (USA)	45.18	Walter McCoy (USA)	45.33	Gérson de Souza (BRA)	45.91
1983	Sunday Uti (NGR)	45.32	Viktor Markin (URS)	45.38	Sunder Nix (USA)	45.53
1985	Innocent Egbunike (NGR)	45.10	Roberto Hernández (CUB)	45.41	Sunday Uti (NGR)	45.58
1987	Mike Franks (USA)	45.33	Moses Ugbisien (NGR)	45.37	Raymond Pierre (USA)	45.67
1989	Roberto Hernández (CUB)	45.42	Sérgio Menezes (BRA)	45.66	Oliver Bridges (USA)	45.66
1991	Patrick O'Connor (JAM)	45.52	Benyounés Lahlou (MAR)	45.55	Marlin Cannon (USA)	45.78
1993	Ibrahim Hassan (GHA)	45.87	Evon Clarke (JAM)	46.27	Danny McFarlane (JAM)	46.60
1995	Eswort Coombs (VIN)	45.38	Udeme Ekpeyong (NGR)	45.57	Dmitry Kosov (RUS)	45.70
1997	Clement Chukwu (NGR)	44.81	Jerome Davis (USA)	45.30	Linval Laird (JAM)	45.54
1999	Jerome Davis (USA)	44.91	Paston Coke (JAM)	45.15	Jopie van Oudtshoorn (RSA)	45.21
2001	Andrew Pierce (USA)	45.34	Clinton Hill (AUS)	45.63	Andriy Tverdostup (UKR)	45.78
2003	Andriy Tverdostup; Ukraine	46.08	Denis Rypakov; Kazakhstan	46.51	Rafał Wieruszewski; Poland	46.53
2005	Marvin Essor; Jamaica	45.99	DeWayne Barrett; Jamaica	46.14	Yuki Yamaguchi; Japan	46.15
2007	Sean Wroe (AUS)	45.49	Piotr Klimczak (POL)	46.06 SB	Dmitry Buryak (RUS)	46.22 SB
2009	Yuzo Kanemaru; Japan	45.68	Clemens Zeller; Austria	46.12	Daniel Harper; Canada	46.22
2011	Marcell Deák-Nagy; Hungary	45.50	Peter Matthews; Jamaica	45.62; PB	Sean Wroe; Australia	45.93; SB
2013	Vladimir Krasnov; Russia	45.49	Anderson Henriques; Brazil	45.50	Nicholas Maitland; Jamaica	45.63
2015	Luguelín Santos; Dominican Republic	44.91 SB	Leaname Maotoanong; Botswana	45.63 PB	Jan Tesař; Czech Republic	45.73 PB
2017	Luguelín Santos; Dominican Republic	45.24 SB	Yoandys Lescay; Cuba	45.31 SB	Rafał Omelko; Poland	45.56
2019	Valente Mendoza; Mexico	45.63 PB	Mikhail Litvin; Kazakhstan	45.77 SB	Gardeo Isaacs; South Africa	45.89

=== 800m ===
Games	Gold		Silver		Bronze	
1959	Dieter Heydecke (FRG)	1:50.5	John Holt (GBR)	1:50.5	Kuniaki Watanabe (JPN)	1:50.9
1961	Ron Delany (IRL)	1:51.1	Rudolf Klaban (AUT)	1:51.4	Wolfgang Schöll (FRG)	1:51.6
1963	Mamoru Morimoto (JPN)	1:48.1	John Boulter (GBR)	1:48.6	Norbert Haupert (LUX)	1:49.5
1965	Bill Crothers (CAN)	1:47.7	George Germann (USA)	1:47.8	Rudolf Klaban (AUT)	1:48.2
1967	Ralph Doubell (AUS)	1:46.7	Franz-Josef Kemper (FRG)	1:46.7	Bodo Tümmler (FRG)	1:47.8
1970	Franz-Josef Kemper (FRG)	1:49.1	Martin Winbolt-Lewis (GBR)	1:49.2	Donaldo Arza (PAN)	1:49.5
1973	Yevhen Arzhanov (URS)	1:46.88	Marcel Philippe (FRA)	1:47.29	Hans-Henning Ohlert (GDR)	1:47.51
1975	Waldemar Gondek (POL)	1:50.04	Pavel Litovchenko (URS)	1:50.13	Sid Ali Djouadi (ALG)	1:50.19
1977	Alberto Juantorena (CUB)	1:43.44 WR	Milovan Savić (YUG)	1:45.6	José Marajo (FRA)	1:45.89
1979	Evans White (USA)	1:48.87	Garry Cook (GBR)	1:49.50	Hans-Peter Ferner (FRG)	1:49.77
1981	Andreas Hauck (GDR)	1:50.12	Sotirios Moutsanas (GRE)	1:50.20	Pavel Troshchilo (URS)	1:50.26
1983	Ryszard Ostrowski (POL)	1:46.29	Graham Williamson (GBR)	1:46.66	Mohamed Alouini (TUN)	1:46.75
1985	Ryszard Ostrowski (POL)	1:44.38	Viktor Kalinkin (URS)	1:45.21	John Marshall (USA)	1:45.32
1987	Slobodan Popović (YUG)	1:46.13	Moussa Fall (SEN)	1:46.71	Luis Toledo (MEX)	1:47.07
1989	Ari Suhonen (FIN)	1:47.13	Ikem Billy (GBR)	1:47.29	Simon Doyle (AUS)	1:47.48
1991	Giuseppe D'Urso (ITA)	1:46.82	Dean Kenneally (AUS) Curtis Robb (GBR)	1:46.88	Not awarded	
1993	Marko Koers (NED)	1:48.57	Oleg Stepanov (RUS)	1:49.50	Nico Motchebon (GER)	1:49.52
1995	Hezekiél Sepeng (RSA)	1:47.87	Andrés Manuel Díaz (ESP)	1:48.06	Pavel Soukup (CZE)	1:48.15
1997	Norberto Téllez (CUB)	1:47.63	Hezekiél Sepeng (RSA)	1:47.77	Bryan Woodward (USA)	1:48.43
1999	Norberto Téllez (CUB)	1:46.11	André Bucher (SUI)	1:46.49	Derrick Peterson (USA)	1:46.75
2001	Khalid Tighazouine (MAR)	1:45.27	Derrick Peterson (USA)	1:45.49	Otukile Lekote (BOT)	1:45.63
2003	Roman Oravec; Czech Republic	1:48.01	Ramil Aritkulov; Russia	1:48.19	Fabiano Peçanha; Brazil	1:48.20
2005	Fabiano Peçanha; Brazil	1:46.01	Selahattin Çobanoğlu; Turkey	1:47.49	Maksim Adamovich; Russia	1:47.50
2007	Ehsan Mohajer Shojaei (IRI)	1:46.04	Fabiano Peçanha (BRA)	1:46.11	Livio Sciandra (ITA)	1:46.19
2009	Sajjad Moradi; Iran	1:48.02	Goran Nava; Serbia	1:48.06	Fabiano Peçanha; Brazil	1:48.07
2011	Lachlan Renshaw; Australia	1:46.36	Teng Haining; China	1:46.62; PB	Fred Samoei; Kenya	1:46.72
2013	Nijel Amos; Botswana	1:46.53	Jozef Repčík; Slovakia	1:47.30 SB	Andreas Vojta; Austria	1:47.31
2015	Shaquille Walker; United States	1:49.05	Abdelati El Guesse; Morocco	1:49.29	Rynardt van Rensburg; South Africa	1:49.30
2017	Jesús Tonatiú López; Mexico	1:46.06 PB	Mohamed Belbachir; Algeria	1:46.73	Aymeric Lusine; France	1:47.18
2019	Mohamed Belbachir; Algeria	1:47.02	Mouad Zahafi; Morocco	1:47.64	Lukáš Hodboď; Czech Republic	1:47.97 SB

=== 1500m ===
Games	Gold		Silver		Bronze	
1959	Béla Szekeres (HUN)	3:50.9	John Winch (GBR)	3:52.0	Kuniaki Watanabe (JPN)	3:52.1
1961	Tomáš Salinger (TCH)	3:45.75	Zoltan Vamoș (ROM)	3:45.85	Rudolf Klaban (AUT)	3:46.16
1963	John Whetton (GBR)	3:49.5	Mamoru Morimoto (JPN)	3:49.6	Karl Eyerkaufer (FRG)	3:49.7
1965	Bodo Tümmler (FRG)	3:46.2	Andy Green (GBR)	3:46.7	Zbigniew Wójcic (POL)	3:47.3
1967	Bodo Tümmler (FRG)	3:43.4	Dave Bailey (CAN)	3:43.5	Gianni Del Buono (ITA)	3:44.0
1970	Franco Arese (ITA)	3:52.7	John Kirkbride (GBR)	3:52.9	Gianni Del Buono (ITA)	3:53.0
1973	Frank Clement (GBR)	3:42.32 UR	Tony Waldrop (USA)	3:42.70	Reggie McAfee (USA)	3:43.20
1975	Thomas Wessinghage (FRG)	3:39.73	Steve Heidenreich (USA)	3:40.56	Gheorghe Ghipu (ROM)	3:41.19
1977	Jozef Plachý (TCH)	3:40.2	Mike Kearns (GBR)	3:40.9	Abderrahmane Morceli (ALG)	3:41.0
1979	Graham Williamson (GBR)	3:45.37	Pierre Délèze (SUI)	3:45.8	Richie Harris (USA)	3:46.4
1981	Saïd Aouita (MAR)	3:38.43 GR	Vinko Pokrajčić (YUG)	3:39.83	Amar Brahmia (ALG)	3:39.85
1983	Claudio Patrignani (ITA)	3:41.02	Andreas Baranski (FRG)	3:41.21	Geoff Turnbull (GBR)	3:41.24
1985	Chris McGeorge (GBR)	3:46.22	Adam Dixon (USA)	3:46.29	Dragan Zdravković (YUG)	3:46.78
1987	Hauke Fuhlbrügge (GDR)	3:44.87	Rob Harrison (GBR)	3:45.13	Andrey Ponomaryov (URS)	3:45.52
1989	Kipkoech Cheruiyot (KEN)	3:40.38	Peter Rono (KEN)	3:40.79	Bob Dielis (NED)	3:40.93
1991	Niall Bruton (IRL)	3:50.69	Davide Tirelli (ITA)	3:50.79	Juan Viudes (ESP)	3:51.22
1993	Abdelkader Chékhémani (FRA)	3:46.32	Bill Burke (USA)	3:46.33	Gary Lough (GBR)	3:46.77
1995	Abdelkader Chékhémani (FRA)	3:46.53	Andrea Giocondi (ITA)	3:47.11	Abdelhamid Slimani (ALG)	3:47.43
1997	Anthony Whiteman (GBR)	3:43.57	Carlos García (ESP)	3:43.97	António Travassos (POR)	3:44.14
1999	Bernard Lagat (KEN)	3:40.99	Leszek Zblewski (POL)	3:41.81	Lorenzo Lazzari (ITA)	3:42.36
2001	Pedro Antonio Esteso (ESP)	3:43.98	Gareth Turnbull (IRL)	3:44.21	Aléxis Abraham (FRA)	3:44.48
2003	Johan Pretorius; South Africa	3:42.81	Pedro Antonio Esteso; Spain	3:42.82	Fabiano Peçanha; Brazil	3:43.91
2005	Ivan Heshko; Ukraine	3:49.49	Andy Baddeley; Great Britain	3:50.90	Vincent Rono; Kenya	3:51.48
2007	Samir Khadar (ALG)	3:39.62	Álvaro Rodríguez (ESP)	3:39.78	Fabiano Peçanha (BRA)	3:40.98
2009	Vyacheslav Sokolov; Russia	3:42.49	Samir Khadar; Algeria	3:42.50	Goran Nava; Serbia	3:42.88
2011	Imad Touil; Algeria	3:48.13	Abdelmadjed Touil; Algeria	3:48.24	Valentin Smirnov; Russia	3:48.45
2013	Valentin Smirnov; Russia	3:39.39	Jeremy Rae; Canada	3:39.45	Jeremiah Motsau; South Africa	3:39.51
2015	Aleksey Kharitonov; Russia	3:39.13 PB	Abdelali Razyn; Morocco	3:39.20 PB	Staffan Ek; Sweden	3:39.68 PB
2017	Timo Benitz; Germany	3:43.45	Alexis Miellet; France	3:43.91	Jonathan Davies; Great Britain	3:43.99
2019	Michał Rozmys; Poland	3:53.67	Jan Friš; Czech Republic	3:53.95	Joonas Rinne; Finland	3:54.02

=== 5000m ===
Games	Gold		Silver		Bronze	
1959	Kevin Gilligan (GBR)	14:09.8	Saburo Yokomizo (JPN)	14:14.8	Jaroslav Bohatý-Pavelka (TCH)	14:18.0
1961	János Pintér (HUN)	14:23.4	Andrei Barabaș (ROM)	14:23.8	Peter Kubicki (FRG)	14.23.8
1963	Leonid Ivanov (URS)	14:21.4	Béla Szekeres (HUN)	14:32.0	Ron Hill (GBR)	14:43.2
1965	Keisuke Sawaki (JPN)	13:45.2	Lutz Philipp (FRG)	13:46.6	Fergus Murray (GBR)	13:52.6
1967	Keisuke Sawaki (JPN)	14:03.8	Van Nelson (USA)	14:05.4	John Jackson (GBR)	14:06.6
1970	Nikolay Puklakov (URS)	13:56.4	Jens Wollenberg (FRG)	14:00.8	Giuseppe Cindolo (ITA)	14:01.4
1973	Mikhail Zhelobovskiy (URS)	13:41.25	Glenn Herold (USA)	13:41.87	Valentin Zotov (URS)	13:43.60
1975	Franco Fava (ITA)	13:37.56	Ilie Floroiu (ROM)	13:39.20	Julian Goater (GBR)	13:42.02
1977	Enn Sellik (URS)	13:44.6	Jerzy Kowol (POL)	13:45.1	Leonid Moseyev (URS)	13:45.6
1979	Ilie Floroiu (ROM)	14:12.9	José Gómez (MEX)	14:15.4	Enrique Aquino (MEX)	14:18.0
1981	Doug Padilla (USA)	13:49.95	Jozef Lenčéš (TCH)	13:50.34	Frank Zimmermann (FRG)	13:50.84
1983	Steve Harris (GBR)	13:46.99	Féthi Baccouche (TUN)	13:47.69	Shuichi Yoneshige (JPN)	13:48.13
1985	Stefano Mei (ITA)	13:56.48	Carey Nelson (CAN)	13:57.77	Rob Lonergan (CAN)	13:58.02
1987	Anacleto Jiménez (ESP)	14:08.15	Michael Blackmore (USA)	14:08.30	David Swain (GBR)	14:09.21
1989	Stefano Mei (ITA)	13:39.04 GR	Charles Cheruiyot (KEN)	13:39.42	Antonio Serrano (ESP)	13:39.50
1991	John Mayock (GBR)	13:39.25	David Evans (AUS) Peter Sherry (USA)	13:39.31	Not awarded	
1993	Khalid Khannouchi (MAR)	14:05.33	Sergey Fedotov (RUS)	14:06.15	Toshinari Takaoka (JPN)	14:06.21
1995	Katsuhiro Kawauchi (JPN)	13:53.86	Brahim Boulami (MAR)	13:54.05	Maurizio Leone (ITA)	13:54.13
1997	Simone Zanon (ITA)	13:57.54	Thorsten Naumann (GER)	13:58.35	Dan Browne (USA)	14:00.94
1999	Serhiy Lebid (UKR)	13:37.52	Roberto García (ESP)	13:38.59	Naoki Mishiro (JPN)	13:39.10
2001	Serhiy Lebid (UKR)	13:44.24	Mikhayil Yeginov (RUS)	13:46.63	Christian Belz (SUI)	13:48.21
2003	Serhiy Lebid; Ukraine	13:50.94	Jan Fitschen; Germany	13:53.06	Hicham Bellani; Morocco	13:53.79
2005	Wilson Busienei; Uganda	13:38.81	Reid Coolsaet; Canada	13:39.90	Simon Ndirangu; Kenya	13:43.47
2007	Halil Akkaş (TUR)	14:08.47	Yuki Matsuoka (JPN)	14:09.33	Simon Ayeko (UGA)	14:10.13
2009	Halil Akkaş; Turkey	14:06.96	Bayron Piedra; Ecuador	14:07.11	Elroy Gelant; South Africa	14:07.97
2011	Andy Vernon; Great Britain	14:00.06	Yevgeny Rybakov; Russia	14:00.60	Stefano La Rosa; Italy	14:02.95
2013	Hayle Ibrahimov; Azerbaijan	13:35.89 UR	Paul Chelimo; Kenya	13:37.09	Richard Ringer; Germany	13:37.18
2015	Hayle Ibrahimov; Azerbaijan	13:44.28	Zouhair Talbi; Morocco	14:02.26	Rinas Akhmadeev; Russia	14:05:88
2017	François Barrer; France	14:00.86	Jonathan Davies; Great Britain	14:02.46	Andreas Vojta; Austria	14:02.65
2019	Jonas Raess; Switzerland	14:03.10	Yann Schrub; France	14:03.24	Robin Hendrix; Belgium	14:04.06

=== 10,000m ===
Games	Gold		Silver		Bronze	
1967	Keisuke Sawaki (JPN)	29:00.0	Van Nelson (USA)	29:00.6	Lutz Philipp (FRG)	29:21.4
1970	Rashid Sharafetdinov (URS)	29:02.2	Jack Lane (GBR)	29:08.8	Mike Tagg (GBR)	29:22.2
1973	Dane Korica (YUG)	28:48.90	Norman Morrison (GBR)	28:48.99	Patrick Kiingi (KEN)	28:50.80
1975	Franco Fava (ITA)	28:37.92	Ilie Floroiu (ROM)	28:52.49	Jim Brown (GBR)	29:03.54
1977	Leonid Moseyev (URS)	29:12.0	Franco Fava (ITA)	29:12.7	Ilie Floroiu (ROM)	29:13.4
1979	Ilie Floroiu (ROM)	29:56.1	Enrique Aquino (MEX)	30:16.4	Samuel Nyariki (KEN)	30:49.1
1981	Toomas Turb (URS)	29:42.83	Gyorgi Marko (ROM)	29:51.13	Dave Murphy (GBR)	29:51.27
1983	Shuichi Yoneshige (JPN)	28:55.37	Agapius Amo (TAN)	28:55.39	Féthi Baccouche (TUN)	28:55.76
1985	Keith Brantly (USA)	29:11.24	Jesús Herrera (MEX)	29:11.71	Shuichi Yoneshige (JPN)	29:11.73
1987	Axel Krippschock (GDR)	29:07.02	Spyros Andriopoulos (GRE)	29:08.65	Pat Porter (USA)	29:20.95
1989	Julius Kariuki (KEN)	28:35.46 GR	Zeki Öztürk (TUR)	28:39.56	Antonio Serrano (ESP)	28:43.97
1991	Stephan Freigang (GER)	28:15.84 GR	Ryuki Takei (JPN)	28:17.02	Mogambi Otwori (KEN)	28:18.91
1993	Antonio Serrano (ESP)	28:16.16	Yasuyuki Watanabe (JPN)	28:17.26	Vincenzo Modica (ITA)	28:17.73
1995	Yasuyuki Watanabe (JPN)	28:47.78	Stephen Mayaka (KEN)	28:55.02	Gabino Apolonio (MEX)	29:07.95
1997	Kamiel Maase (NED)	28:22.11	Dan Browne (USA)	28:27.64	Rachid Berradi (ITA)	28:30.05
1999	José Manuel Martínez (ESP)	29:37.56	Naoki Mishiro (JPN)	29:39.14	Pedro Trejo (ESP)	29:47.27
2001	John Kanyi (KEN)	28:27.42	Ignacio Cáceres (ESP)	28:43.63	Kazuyoshi Tokumoto (JPN)	28:47.34
2003	Jan Fitschen; Germany	29:39.47	Abdellah Bay; Morocco	29:41.54	Ryuichi Hashinokuchi; Japan	29:42.07
2005	Wilson Busienei; Uganda	28:27.57	Mohamed Fadil; Morocco	28:31.86	Karim El Mabchour; Morocco	28:43.15
2007	Mohamed Fadil (MAR)	30:19.41 SB	Simon Ayeko (UGA)	30:22.58	Stephen Mokoka (RSA)	30:31.78
2009	Sibabalwe Mzazi; South Africa	28:21.44	Denis Mayaud; France	28:21.50	Lungisa Mdedelwa; South Africa	28:21.52
2011	Suguru Osako; Japan	28:42.83; SB	Stephen Mokoka; South Africa	28:53.09	Ahmed Tamri; Morocco	29:06.20
2013	Stephen Mokoka; South Africa	28:45.96	Anatoly Rybakov; Russia	28:47.27	Yevgeny Rybakov; Russia	28:47.28
2015	Igor Maksimov; Russia	29:15.30	Nicolae Soare; Romania	29:18.71 PB	Keisuke Nakatani; Japan	29:19.30
2017	Sadic Bahati; Uganda	29:08.68 PB	Nicolae Soare; Romania	29:12.76 PB	Kazuya Shiojiri; Japan	29:20.96
2019	Mokofane Kekana; South Africa	29:29.43	Hiroki Abe; Japan	29:30.01	Adriaan Wildschutt; South Africa	29:36.39

=== Marathon ===
Games	Gold		Silver		Bronze	
1981	Ivan Kovalchuk (URS)	2:22:14 GR	Herbert Wills (USA)	2:23:22	Gheorghe Buruiana (ROM)	2:24:45
1983	Alessio Faustini (ITA)	2:17:10	Giovanni D'Aleo (ITA)	2:17:20	Michael Spöttel (FRG)	2:18:12
1985	Orlando Pizzolato (ITA)	2:20:06	Salvatore Nicosia (ITA)	2:21:09	Paul Gompers (USA)	2:21:40
1987	Takahiro Izumi (JPN)	2:24:23	Takahashi Murakami (JPN)	2:24:55	Viktor Gural (URS)	2:27:01
1989	Tibor Baier (HUN)	2:14:33 GR	Ruslam Shagiyev (URS)	2:14:59	Kennedy Manyisa (KEN)	2:15:23
1991	Hwang Young-cho (KOR)	2:12:40 GR	Kenjiro Jitsui (JPN)	2:14:22	Choi Hyong-Chol (PRK)	2:17:45
1993	Kennedy Manyisa (KEN)	2:12:19 GR	Kim Wan-gi (KOR)	2:15:35	Hyung Jae-Young (KOR)	2:15:53
1995	Takaki Morikawa (JPN)	2:21:32	Patrick Muturi (KEN)	2:24:29	Kim Ki-Young (KOR)	2:24:43

=== Half marathon ===
Games	Gold		Silver		Bronze	
1997	Marílson dos Santos (BRA)	1:03:32	Stephen Mayaka (KEN)	1:03:51	Solomon Wachira (KEN)	1:04:05
1999	Marílson dos Santos (BRA)	1:04:05	Takayuki Nishida (JPN)	1:04:11	Oh Sung-Keun (KOR)	1:04:33
2001	Masakazu Fujiwara (JPN)	1:04:12	Wodage Zvadya (ISR)	1:04:30	Ryoji Matsushita (JPN)	1:04:53
2003	Abdellah Bay; Morocco	1:04:21	Francis Yiga; Uganda	1:05:24	Ivan Sanchez Diez; Spain	1:05:29
2005	Wilson Busienei; Uganda	1:03:47	Takayuki Tagami; Japan	1:03:48	Mohamed Fadil; Morocco	1:03:52
2007	Mohamed Fadil (MAR)	1:05:49 SB	Najim El Gady (MAR)	1:06:04	Takashi Toyoda (JPN)	1:06:30
2009	Zhao Ran; China	1:04:28	Tomoya Onishi; Japan	1:04:30	Francesco Bona; Italy	1:04:35
2011	Ahmed Tamri; Morocco	1:06:20	Fatih Bilgic; Turkey	1:06:20	Tsubasa Hayakawa; Japan	1:06:25
2013	Sibabalwe Mzazi; South Africa	1:03:37 SB	Stephen Mokoka; South Africa	1:03:37	Shogo Nakamura; Japan	1:04:21
2015	Yusuke Ogura; Japan	1:04:41	Tadashi Isshiki; Japan	1:04:52	Yuta Takahashi; Japan	1:05:29
2017	Kei Katanishi; Japan	1:06:09	Naoki Kudo; Japan	1:06:23	Kengo Suzuki; Japan	1:06:56
2019	Akira Aizawa; Japan	1:05:15	Taisei Nakamura; Japan	1:05:27	Tatsuhiko Ito; Japan	1:05:

=== 110 hurdles ===
Games	Gold		Silver		Bronze	
1959	Stanko Lorger (YUG)	14.2	Nereo Svara (ITA)	14.4	Giorgio Mazza (ITA)	14.4
1961	Valentin Chistyakov (URS)	14.33	Klaus Willimczik (FRG)	14.62	Wiesław Król (POL)	14.81
1963	Anatoly Mikhaylov (URS)	14.17	Giorgio Mazza (ITA)	14.25	Mike Hogan (GBR)	14.40
1965	Eddy Ottoz (ITA)	13.6	Giovanni Cornacchia (ITA)	13.9	Willie Davenport (USA)	14.0
1967	Eddy Ottoz (ITA)	13.9	Ron Copeland (USA)	14.0	Pierre Schoebel (FRA)	14.3
1970	David Hemery (GBR)	13.8	Günther Nickel (FRG)	13.9	Sergio Liani (ITA)	13.9
1973	Berwyn Price (GBR)	13.69	Anatoliy Moshiashvili (URS)	13.73	Thomas Munkelt (GDR)	13.80
1975	Charles Foster (USA)	13.83	Eduard Pereverzev (URS)	13.94	Borisav Pisić (YUG)	14.28
1977	Alejandro Casañas (CUB)	13.21 WR	Jan Pusty (POL)	13.53	Vyacheslav Kulebyakin (URS)	13.55
1979	Andrey Prokofyev (URS)	13.50	Thomas Munkelt (GDR)	13.50	Aleksandr Puchkov (URS)	13.55
1981	Larry Cowling (USA)	13.65	Pal Palffy (ROM)	13.73	Georgiy Shabanov (URS)	13.82
1983	Andrey Prokofyev (URS)	13.46	Willie Gault (USA)	13.49	Mark McKoy (CAN)	13.57
1985	Cletus Clark (USA)	13.57	György Bakos (HUN)	13.72	Keith Talley (USA)	13.76
1987	Jon Ridgeon (GBR)	13.29	Arthur Blake (USA)	13.38	Keith Talley (USA)	13.40
1989	Roger Kingdom (USA)	13.26 GR	Emilio Valle (CUB)	13.52	Florian Schwarthoff (FRG)	13.63
1991	Elbert Ellis (USA)	13.83	Jerry Roney (USA)	13.83	Dmitriy Buldov (URS)	13.85
1993	Dietmar Koszewski (GER)	13.48	Glenn Terry (USA)	13.58	Stelios Bisbas (GRE)	13.72
1995	Jonathan Nsenga (BEL)	13.51	Brian Amos (USA)	13.59	Krzysztof Mehlich (POL)	13.66
1997	Andrey Kislykh (RUS)	13.44	Jonathan Nsenga (BEL)	13.51	Dudley Dorival (USA)	13.53
1999	Terrence Trammell (USA)	13.44	Jonathan Nsenga (BEL)	13.51	Dawane Wallace (USA)	13.59
2001	Liu Xiang (CHN)	13.33	Elmar Lichtenegger (AUT)	13.36	Robert Kronberg (SWE)	13.40
2003	Anselmo da Silva; Brazil	13.68	Igor Peremota; Russia	13.75	Park Tae-kyong; South Korea	13.78
2005	Mateus Inocêncio; Brazil	13.45	Jared MacLeod; Canada	13.67	Serhiy Demydyuk; Ukraine	13.69
2007	Serhiy Demydyuk (UKR)	13.33 PB	Ji Wei (CHN)	13.57	Anselmo da Silva (BRA)	13.58
2009	Yin Jing; China	13.38	Lehann Fourie; South Africa	13.66	Emanuele Abate; Italy	13.70
2011	Hansle Parchment; Jamaica	13.24 PB	Jiang Fan; China	13.55	Ronald Brookins; United States	13.56
2013	Eddie Lovett; Virgin Islands	13.43 NR	Konstantin Shabanov; Russia	13.46 SB	Sergey Shubenkov; Russia	13.47
2015	Greggmar Swift; Barbados	13.43	Konstantin Shabanov; Russia	13.57 SB	Genta Masuno; Japan	13.69
2017	Balázs Baji; Hungary	13.35	Chen Kuei-ru; Chinese Taipei	13.55 NR	Damian Czykier; Poland	13.56
2019	Gabriel Constantino; Brazil	13.22	Wilhem Belocian; France	13.30 SB	Shunsuke Izumiya; Japan	13.49 PB

=== 400m hurdles ===
Games	Gold		Silver		Bronze	
1959	Salvatore Morale (ITA)	52.1	Germano Gimelli (ITA)	52.8	Wiesław Król (POL)	53.2
1961	Salvatore Morale (ITA)	50.14	Georgy Chevychalov (URS)	51.80	Elio Catola (ITA)	52.33
1963	Roberto Frinolli (ITA)	50.48	Mike Hogan (GBR)	51.52	Salvatore Morale (ITA)	51.95
1965	Roberto Frinolli (ITA)	50.5	Robert Poirier (FRA)	50.7	Ron Whitney (USA)	51.1
1967	Ron Whitney (USA)	49.8	John Sherwood (GBR)	50.2	Kiyoo Yui (JPN)	51.2
1970	Larry James (USA)	50.2	Werner Reibert (FRG)	50.4	Dmitry Stukalov (URS)	50.7
1973	Dmitry Stukalov (URS)	49.62	Miroslav Kodejš (TCH)	49.94	Tadeusz Kulczycki (POL)	50.54
1975	Rolf Ziegler (FRG)	50.43	Jerzy Hewelt (POL)	50.85	Timo Ogunjimi (NGR)	51.25
1977	Tom Andrews (USA)	49.52	Klaus Schönberger (GDR)	49.55	Rolf Ziegler (FRG)	49.72
1979	Harry Schulting (NED)	48.44 UR	Vasyl Arkhypenko (URS)	48.60	James Walker (USA)	48.88
1981	David Lee (USA)	49.05	Dmitriy Shkarupin (URS)	49.52	Antônio Ferreira (BRA)	50.04
1983	Aleksandr Kharlov (URS)	49.41	Amadou Dia Bâ (SEN)	49.94	David Patrick (USA)	50.28
1985	Tagir Zemskov (URS)	49.38	Henry Amike (NGR)	49.70	René Djédjémel Mélédjé (CIV)	49.73
1987	Dave Patrick (USA)	48.75	Athanassios Kalogiannis (GRE)	48.80	Ryoichi Yoshida (JPN)	49.20
1989	Reggie Davis (USA)	49.74	Vladimir Budko (URS)	50.30	Kevin Henderson (USA)	50.57
1991	Derrick Adkins (USA)	49.01	Yoshihiko Saito (JPN)	50.02	Oleh Tverdokhlib (URS)	50.09
1993	Derrick Adkins (USA)	49.35	Yoshihiko Saito (JPN)	49.61	Dusán Kovács (HUN)	50.12
1995	Kazuhiko Yamazaki (JPN)	48.58	Octavius Terry (USA)	48.95	Yoshihiko Saito (JPN)	49.18
1997	Llewellyn Herbert (RSA)	48.99	Ruslan Mashchenko (RUS)	49.36	Mubarak Al-Nubi (QAT)	49.48
1999	Paweł Januszewski (POL)	48.64	Bayano Kamani (USA)	48.74	Marcel Schelbert (SUI)	48.77
2001	Alwyn Myburgh (RSA)	48.09 UR	Yevgeniy Meleshenko (KAZ)	48.46	Chen Tien-wen (TPE)	48.63
2003	Thomas Koortbeek; Netherlands	48.95	Matthew Douglas; Great Britain	49.26	Hendrick Botha; South Africa	49.51
2005	Kenji Narisako; Japan	48.96	Takayuki Koike; Japan	49.75	Greg Little; Jamaica	49.77
2007	Petrus Koekemoer (RSA)	49.06	Kurt Couto (MOZ)	49.12 SB	Javier Culson (PUR)	49.35
2009	Tristan Thomas; Australia	48.75	Kazuaki Yoshida; Japan	49.78	Michaël Bultheel; Belgium	49.79
2011	Jeshua Anderson; United States	49.03	Takayuki Kishimoto; Japan	49.52	Kurt Couto; Mozambique	49.61
2013	Martin Kučera; Slovakia	49.79 PB	Amadou Ndiaye; Senegal	49.90	Ian Dewhurst; Australia	49.96
2015	Thomas Barr; Ireland	48.78	Abdelmalik Lahoulou; Algeria	48.99 PB	Ivan Shablyuyev; Russia	49.04 PB
2017	Juander Santos; Dominican Republic	48.65	Chen Chieh; Chinese Taipei	49.05 PB	Abdelmalik Lahoulou; Algeria	49.30
2019	Alison dos Santos; Brazil	48.57 SB	Sokwakhana Zazini; South Africa	48.73 SB	Patryk Dobek; Poland	48.99

=== 3000m steeplechase ===
Games	Gold		Silver		Bronze	
1967	Jouko Kuha (FIN)	8:38.2	John Jackson (GBR)	8:42.8	Nobuyoshi Miura (JPN)	8:52.2
1970	Mikhail Zhelev (BUL)	8:32.6	Andy Holden (GBR)	8:36.6	Takaharu Koyama (JPN)	8:38.0
1973	Leonid Savelyev (URS)	8:26.49	Michael Karst (FRG)	8:28.32	Jan Kondzior (POL)	8:28.66
1975	Bronisław Malinowski (POL)	8:22.32	Michael Karst (FRG)	8:28.22	Kazimierz Maranda (POL)	8:29.23
1977	Michael Karst (FRG)	8:25.9	Paul Copu (ROM)	8:28.8	Ron Addison (USA)	8:29.4
1979	Paul Copu (ROM)	8:57.7	Mariano Scartezzini (ITA)	8:58.1	Michele Cinà (ITA)	9:08.7
1981	John Gregorek (USA)	8:21.26 GR	Tommy Ekblom (FIN)	8:21.93	Mariano Scartezzini (ITA)	8:28.03
1983	Peter Daenens (BEL)	8:28.86	Farley Gerber (USA)	8:29.07	Shigeyuki Aikyo (JPN)	8:33.44
1985	Franco Boffi (ITA)	8:28.75	Eddie Wedderburn (GBR)	8:28.90	Hans Koeleman (NED)	8:32.19
1987	Valeriy Vandyak (URS)	8:33.23	Juan Ramón Conde (CUB)	8:33.86	Shigeyuki Aikyo (JPN)	8:34.23
1989	Patrick Sang (KEN)	8:32.78	Engelbert Franz (FRG)	8:33.25	Thierry Brusseau (FRA)	8:35.78
1991	Shaun Creighton (AUS)	8:32.30	Akira Nakamura (JPN)	8:33.50	Gavin Gaynor (USA)	8:34.21
1993	Michael Buchleitner (AUT)	8:30.82	Vladimir Pronin (RUS)	8:32.03	Bizuneh Yae Tura (ETH)	8:32.07
1995	Daniel Njenga (KEN)	8:27.03	Joël Bourgeois (CAN)	8:28.44	Brahim Boulami (MAR)	8:35.53
1997	Mark Ostendarp (GER)	8:25.83	Marcel Laros (NED)	8:27.91	Michael Buchleitner (AUT)	8:28.92
1999	Giuseppe Maffei (ITA)	8:33.18	Khamis Seif Abdullah (QAT)	8:33.62	Joël Bourgeois (CAN)	8:34.20
2001	Anthony Famiglietti (USA)	8:21.97	Jakub Czaja (POL)	8:23.00	Christian Belz (SUI)	8:24.46
2003	César Pérez; Spain	8:38.52	Vincent Zouaoui-Dandrieux; France	8:39.24	Andrey Olshanskiy; Russia	8:39.62
2005	Halil Akkaş; Turkey	8:30.16	Ion Luchianov; Moldova	8:30.66	Ruben Ramolefi; South Africa	8:31.53
2007	Halil Akkaş (TUR)	8:20.83 CR	Barnabas Kirui (KEN)	8:22.67	Ion Luchianov (MDA)	8:23.83
2009	Ion Luchianov; Moldova	8:25.79	Halil Akkaş; Turkey	8:25.80	Steffen Uliczka; Germany	8:26.18
2011	Alberto Paulo; Portugal	8:32.26	Halil Akkaş; Turkey	8:34.57 SB	Ildar Minshin; Russia	8:34.86
2013	Ilgizar Safiullin; Russia	8:32.53	Sebastián Martos; Spain	8:37.94	Patrick Nasti; Italy	8:38.41
2015	Martin Grau; Germany	8:31.55 SB	Kaur Kivistik; Estonia	8:32.23 PB	Yuriy Kloptsov; Russia	8:33.09
2017	Krystian Zalewski; Poland	8:35.88	Rantso Mokopane; South Africa	8:36.25	Ali Messaoudi; Algeria	8:37.14
2019	Mounaime Sassioui; Morocco	8:30.24	Rantso Mokopane; South Africa	8:30.37 PB	Ashley Smith; South Africa	8:33.60

=== 4x100m relay ===
Games	Gold		Silver		Bronze	
1959	Italy (ITA); Guido De Murtas; Salvatore Giannone; Giorgio Mazza; Livio Berruti	41.0	West Germany (FRG); Rudolf Sundermann; Martin Reichert; Burkhart Quantz; Fritz Helfrich	41.0	France (FRA); Ali Brakchi; Joël Caprice; Jean-Claude Penez; Guy Lagorce	41.4
1961	Soviet Union (URS); Leonid Bartenyev; Valentin Chistyakov; Anatoly Mikhaylov; Edvin Ozolin	41.22	Japan (JPN); Kiyoshi Asai; Kimitada Hayase; Yojiro Muro; Takayuki Okazaki	41.30	West Germany (FRG); Hans-Jürgen Felsen; Rudolf Sundermann; Hinrick Helmke; Joachim Guter	41.35
1963	Hungary (HUN); Csaba Csutorás; László Mihályfi; István Gyulai; Gyula Rábai	40.98	Cuba (CUB); Alejandro Pasqual; Manuel Montalvo; Lázaro Betancourt; Enrique Figuerola	41.37	France (FRA); Gérard Zingg; Jean-Pierre Fabre; Alain Roy; Alain Moreaux	41.82
1965	West Germany (FRG); Gert Metz; Fritz Obersiebrasse; Hans-Jürgen Felsen; Rudolf Sundermann	39.9	Soviet Union (URS); Nikolay Politiko; Edvin Ozolin; Boris Zubov; Igor Ter-Ovanesyan	40.1	France (FRA); Alain Roy; Jean-Paul Lambrot; Marc Bienvenu; Pierre Burrellier	40.3
1967	Italy (ITA); Vittorio Roscio; Ennio Preatoni; Ippolito Giani; Livio Berruti	39.8	Japan (JPN); Naoki Abe; Junji Ishikawa; Yosiyuki Moriya; Shinji Ogura	40.2	Great Britain (GBR); Bob Frith; Menzies Campbell; Mike Hauck; Jim Barry	40.3
1970	Poland (POL); Stanisław Wagner; Jan Werner; Gerard Gramse; Zenon Nowosz	39.2	Cuba (CUB); Barbaro Bandomo; Juan Morales; Pablo Montes; José Triana	39.2	Soviet Union (URS); Aleksandr Kornelyuk; Vladislav Sapeya; Boris Izmestyev; Valentin Maslakov	39.4
1973	United States (USA); Thomas Whatley; Wardell Gilbreath; Larry Brown; Steve Riddick	39.10 UR	Soviet Union (URS); Aleksandr Zhidkikh; Vladimir Lovetskiy; Juris Silovs; Volodymyr Atamas	39.46	Italy (ITA); Vincenzo Guerini; Luigi Benedetti; Sergio Morselli; Pietro Mennea	39.55
1975	Soviet Union (URS); Nikolay Kolesnikov; Juris Silovs; Sergey Vladimirtsev; Aleksandr Zhidkikh	39.80	Canada (CAN); Marvin Nash; Albin Dukowski; Robert Martin; Bryan Saunders	40.06	West Germany (FRG); Klaus-Dieter Bieler; Klaus Ehl; Reinhard Borchert; Dieter Steinmann	40.20
1977	Soviet Union (URS); Nikolay Kolesnikov; Aleksandr Aksinin; Juris Silovs; Vladimir Ignatenko	38.75	Italy (ITA); Stefano Curini; Stefano Rasori; Pietro Farina; Luciano Caravani	39.15	United States (USA); William Snoddy; Mike Kee; Clancy Edwards; Harvey Glance	39.17
1979	Italy (ITA); Gianfranco Lazzer; Luciano Caravani; Giovanni Grazioli; Pietro Mennea	38.42 UR	Ivory Coast (CIV); Patrice Ouré; Amadou Meïté; Avognan Nogboun; Georges Kablan Degnan	38.73	France (FRA); Jean Gracia; Pierrick Thessard; Gabriel Brothier; Pascal Barré	39.07
1981	United States (USA); Mel Lattany; Anthony Ketchum; Jason Grimes; Calvin Smith	38.70	Soviet Union (URS); Andrey Shlyapnikov; Nikolay Sidorov; Aleksandr Aksinin; Vladimir Muravyov	38.94	France (FRA); Philippe Le Joncour; Stéphane Adam; Gabriel Brothier; Aldo Canti	39.50
1983	United States (USA); Terry Scott; Sam Graddy; Ken Robinson; Willie Gault	38.50	Canada (CAN); Desai Williams; Sterling Hinds; Tony Sharpe; Ben Johnson	38.69	Soviet Union (URS); Andrey Prokofyev; Nikolay Sidorov; Vladimir Muravyov; Aleksandr Zolotaryev	39.04
1985	Cuba (CUB); Ricardo Chacón; Leandro Peñalver; Sergio Querol; Andrés Simón	38.76	Canada (CAN); Rick Jones; Mike Dwyer; Cyprian Enweani; Atlee Mahorn	39.07	United States (USA); Lee McNeill; Thomas Jefferson; Keith Talley; Mike Morris; Lorenzo Daniel	39.15
1987	United States (USA); Lee McRae; Floyd Heard; Lorenzo Daniel; Wallace Spearmon Sr. Michael Marsh; Brian Cooper	38.66	France (FRA); Pierre Boutry; Christophe Boyer; Jean-Charles Trouabal; Bruno Dufernez	39.42	Japan (JPN); Shinji Aoto; Takashi Ichikawa; Hirohisa Ota; Hiroki Fuwa	39.57
1989	United States (USA); Slip Watkins; Tony Dees; Andre Cason; Michael Marsh	38.58	Soviet Union (URS); Andrey Razin; Dmitriy Vanyaykin; Andrey Fedoriv; Igor Groshev	39.35	France (FRA); Pierre Boutry; Francis Darlis; Laurent Leconte; Jean-Charles Trouabal	39.67
1991	United States (USA); Jon Drummond; Boris Goins; Michael Bates; James Trapp	39.10	Sierra Leone (SLE); Josephus Thomas; Horace Dove-Edwin; Benjamin Grant; Sanusi Turay	39.88	Belgium (BEL); David Branle; Jeroen Fischer; Stefaan Allemeersch; Patrick Stevens	40.05
1993	United States (USA); Bryan Bridgewater; David Oaks; Tony Miller; Sam Jefferson	38.65	Japan (JPN); Satoru Inoue; Tatsuo Sugimoto; Hideaki Miyata; Hisatsugu Suzuki	38.97	Cuba (CUB); Joel Isasi; Joel Lamela; Jorge Aguilera; Iván García	39.20
1995	United States (USA); Terrance Bowen; David Oaks; Peter Hargraves; David Dopek	38.96	Great Britain (GBR); Paul White; Toby Box; Douglas Walker; Michael Afilaka	39.39	Italy (ITA); Angelo Cipolloni; Alessandro Orlandi; Carlo Occhiena; Andrea Colombo	39.64
1997	United States (USA); Vincent Henderson; Bryan Howard; Jonathan Carter; Tony McCall	38.48	Cuba (CUB); Anier García; Misael Ortiz; Iván García; Luis Alberto Pérez-Rionda	38.52	Great Britain (GBR); Dan Money; Jamie Henthorn; Ross Baillie; Douglas Walker	39.23
1999	United States (USA); Kaaron Conwright; Terrence Trammell; Coby Miller; John Capel	38.55	South Africa (RSA); Morné Nagel; Bradley Agnew; Lee-Roy Newton; Matthew Quinn	39.08	Italy (ITA); Luca Verdecchia; Alessandro Orlandi; Alessandro Attene; Andrea Colombo	39.31
2001	Japan (JPN); Shingo Kawabata; Kenji Nara; Yusuke Omae; Masayuki Okusako	38.77	United States (USA); Kaaron Conwright; Gerald Williams; Marcus Brunson; Josh Norman	39.14	Italy (ITA); Andrea Rabino; Luca Verdecchia; Andrea Colombo; Massimiliano Donati	39.35
2003	Japan; Kazuki Ishikura, Shinji Takahira, Tatsuro Yoshino, Tomoyuki Arai	39.45	Russia; Yevgeniy Vorobyev, Aleksandr Ryabov, Roman Smirnov, Andrey Yepishin	39.67	Estonia; Allar Aasma, Henri Sool, Martin Vihmann, Mikk Joorits	39.99
2005	Italy; Luca Verdecchia, Alessandro Rocco, Massimiliano Donati, Stefano Anceschi	39.25	Japan; Kazuya Kitamura, Masaya Aikawa, Masaya Minami, Shinji Takahira	39.29	Great Britain; Gavin Eastman, Tyrone Edgar, Darren Chin, Tim Abeyie	39.41
2007	Thailand; Pirom Autas, Wachara Sondee, Sompote Suwannarangsri, Sittichai Suwonprateep	39.15	South Africa; Hannes Dreyer, Leigh Julius, Hendrik Kotze, Snyman Prinsloo; Petrus Koekemoer	39.20	China; Wang Xiaoxu, Zhang Peimeng, Du Bing, Yin Hualong	39.30
2009	Maksim Mokrousov; Ivan Teplykh; Roman Smirnov; Konstantin Petryashov; Russia	39.21	Robert Kubaczyk; Artur Zaczek; Kamil Masztak; Dariusz Kuć; Poland	39.33	Leigh Julius; Thuso Mpuang; Kagisho Kumbane; Wilhelm van der Vyver; South Africa	39.52
2011	South Africa (RSA); Hannes Dreyer; Simon Magakwe; Rapula Sefanyetso; Thuso Mpuang	39.25	China (CHN); Yang Yang; Huang Minhua; Chang Pengben; Zheng Dongsheng	39.39	Hong Kong (HKG); Yip Siukeung; Lai Chun Ho; Leung Kiho; Ho Man Lok	39.44
2013	Ukraine (UKR); Ruslan Perestiuk; Serhiy Smelyk; Ihor Bodrov; Vitaliy Korzh	38.56	Japan (JPN); Ryota Yamagata; Yousuke Hara; Rui Yonaguni; Shōta Iizuka	39.12	Poland (POL); Jakub Adamski; Dariusz Kuć; Artur Zaczek; Kamil Kryński	39.29
2015	Japan (JPN); Kazuma Ōseto; Kotaro Taniguchi; Takuya Nagata; Tatsuro Suwa; Yuki Koike*	39.08	Poland (POL); Adam Pawłowski; Grzegorz Zimniewicz; Artur Zaczek; Kamil Kryński; Jakub Adamski*	39.50	South Africa (RSA); Akani Simbine; Gideon Trotter; Eckhardt Roussouw; Ncincilili Titi	39.68
2017	Japan (JPN); Yusuke Tanaka; Shuhei Tada; Sho Kitagawa; Jun Yamashita	38.65 SB	United States (USA); John Lewis III; LeShon Collins; Jacarias Martin; Cameron Burrell	38.69	Chinese Taipei (TPE); Wei Yi-ching; Yang Chun-han; Cheng Po-yu; Chen Chia-hsun	39.06 SB
2019	Daisuke Miyamoto; Yoshihiro Someya; Jun Yamashita; Bruno Dede; Japan	38.92	Jiang Jiehua; Jiang Hengnan; Wang Yu; Xuan Dajun; China	39.01	Lee Gyu-hyeong; Ko Seung-hwan; Mo Il-hwan; Park Sie-young; South Korea	39.31

=== 4x400m relay ===
Games	Gold		Silver		Bronze	
1959	West Germany (FRG); Albert Grawitz; Burkhart Quantz; Walter Oberste; Otto Klappert	3:09.5	Italy (ITA); Elio Catola; Nereo Fossati; Mario Fraschini; Germano Gimelli	3:11.4	Great Britain (GBR); Robert Hay; Mike Robinson; John Holt; Norman Futter	3:12.2
1961	West Germany (FRG); Peter Hoppe; Wolfgang Schöll; Otto Graßhoff; Albert Grawitz	3:10.56	Czechoslovakia (TCH); Josef Trousil; Josef Odložil; Milan Jílek; Tomáš Salinger	3:12.93	Great Britain (GBR); Menzies Campbell; John Cooper; Mike Fleet; Mike Robinson	3:14.63
1963	Great Britain (GRB); Adrian Metcalfe; John Boulter; Menzies Campbell; Dick Steane	3:12.02	West Germany (FRG); Peter Hoppe; Wolfgang Scholl; Johannes Schmitt; Hans-Joachim Reske	3:13.02	Italy (ITA); Sergio Bello; Marco Busatto; Mario Fraschini; Roberto Frinolli	3:13.65
1965	Italy (ITA); Sergio Bello; Gian Paolo Iraldo; Bruno Bianchi; Roberto Frinolli	3:08.5	Hungary (HUN); Csaba Csutorás; István Gyulai; Gyula Rábai; László Mihályfi	3:08.7	West Germany (FRG); Werner Tiemann; Manfred Hanike; Dirk von Maltitz; Fritz Roth	3:08.8
1967	West Germany (FRG); Werner Thiemann; Rolf Krüsmann; Helmar Müller; Ingo Röper	3:06.7	Great Britain (GBR); Howard Davies; Mike Hauck; Menzies Campbell; John Sherwood	3:06.7	Australia (AUS); Ralph Doubell; Peter Griffin; Phil King; Greg Lewis	3:08.4
1970	United States (USA); Tom Ulan; Roger Colglazier; Tommy Turner; Larry James	3:03.3	Soviet Union (URS); Yevgeniy Borisenko; Yuriy Zorin; Boris Savchuk; Aleksandr Bratchikov	3:04.2	France (FRA); Patrice Viel; Christian Nicolau; Gilles Bertould; Jacques Carette	3:04.4
1973	United States (USA); Mark Lutz; Darwin Bond; Ron Jenkins; Dennis Schultz	3:04.40	Great Britain (GBR); David Jenkins; Joe Chivers; Stephen Black; Stewart McCallum	3:05.38	West Germany (FRG); Franz-Josef Gleen; Siegfried Götz; Wolfgang Druschky; Bernd Herrmann	3:06.11
1975	Poland (POL); Waldemar Szlendak; Jerzy Pietrzyk; Jerzy Hewelt; Waldemar Gondek	3:09.13	Yugoslavia (YUG); Milorad Čikić; Ivica Ivičak; Milorad Savić; Dragan Životić	3:09.71	Soviet Union (URS); Aleksandr Nosenko; Pavel Kozban; Nikolay Yavtushenko; Aleksandr Bratchikov	3:10.09
1977	United States (USA); Evis Jennings; Willie Smith; Tim Dale; Tom Andrews	3:01.2	Poland (POL); Jerzy Pietrzyk; Henryk Galant; Cezary Łapiński; Ryszard Podlas	3:01.52	West Germany (FRG); Lothar Krieg; Eberhard Schneider; Ulrich Zunker; Rolf Ziegler	3:06.3
1979	United States (USA); Fred Taylor; Leslie Kerr; Ronnie Harris; Walter McCoy	3:00.98	Netherlands (NED); Hugo Pont; Koen Gijsbers; Marcel Klarenbeek; Harry Schulting	3:03.18	Italy (ITA); Stefano Malinverni; Alfonso Di Guida; Flavio Borghi; Roberto Tozzi	3:03.80
1981	Soviet Union (URS); Aleksandr Zolotaryev; Vitaliy Fedotov; Viktor Burakov; Viktor Markin; Aleksandr Kurochkin	3:02.75	United States (USA); David Lee; Anthony Ketchum; David Patrick; Walter McCoy	3:03.01	Brazil (BRA); Katsuhiko Nakaya; Paulo Roberto Correia; Gérson de Souza; António Euzebio Ferreira	3:06.79
1983	United States (USA); Sunder Nix; Eliot Tabron; Alonzo Babers; Cliff Wiley	3:01.24	Soviet Union (URS); Yevgeniy Lomtyev; Aliaksandr Trashchyla; Sergey Kutsebo; Viktor Markin	3:01.58	France (FRA); Yann Quentrec; Hector Llatser; Pascal Chichignoud; Aldo Canti	3:04.89
1985	Cuba (CUB); Lázaro Martínez; Leandro Peñalver; Roberto Ramos; Roberto Hernández	3:02.20	Soviet Union (URS); Tagir Zemskov; Sergey Kutsebo; Yevgeniy Lomtyev; Vladimir Prosin	3:02.66	United States (USA); Clarence Daniel; LeRoy Dixson; Dale Laverty; Cedric Vaughans	3:02.68
1987	United States (USA); Raymond Pierre; Lorenzo Daniel; David Patrick; Kevin Robinzine	3:01.78	Yugoslavia (YUG); Branislav Karaulić; Slobodan Popović; Slobodan Branković; Ismail Mačev	3:03.95	Soviet Union (URS); Oleg Fatun; Valery Starodubtsev; Tagir Zemskov; Vladimir Prosin	3:05.85
1989	Jamaica (JAM); Patrick O'Connor; Devon Morris; Howard Davis; Howard Burnett	3:02.58	United States (USA); Stanley Kerr; George Porter; Michael Johnson; Raymond Pierre	3:02.75	West Germany (FRG); Ulrich Schlepütz; Markus Henrich; Carsten Köhrbrück; Edgar Itt	3:03.69
1991	United States (USA); Chuck Wilson; Marlin Cannon; Brian Irvin; Gabriel Luke	3:03.65	Jamaica (JAM); Linval Laird; Evon Clarke; Howard Davis; Patrick O'Connor	3:05.93	Italy (ITA); Marcello Pantone; Gianrico Boncompagni; Riccardo Cardone; Vito Petrella	3:07.54
1993	United States (USA); Chris Jones; Aaron Payne; Kevin Lyles; Scott Turner	3:02.34	Japan (JPN); Shigekazu Ōmori; Seiji Inagaki; Yoshihiko Saito; Masayoshi Kan	3:03.21	Hungary (HUN); David Somfai; Dusán Kovács; László Kiss; Miklos Arpasi	3:04.27
1995	United States (USA); Ryan Hayden; Leonard Byrd; Andre Morris; Anthuan Maybank	3:00.40 GR	Russia (RUS); Innokenty Zharov; Dmitriy Bey; Sergey Voronin; Dmitry Kosov	3:01.95	Great Britain (GBR); Anthony Williams; Jared Deacon; Gary Jennings; David Grindley	3:02.42
1997	United States (USA); Octavius Terry; Tony Wheeler; Jerome Davis; Bryan Woodward	3:02.53	Jamaica (JAM); Ian Weakley; Linval Laird; Garth Robinson; Dennis Blake	3:02.68	Great Britain (GBR); Richard Knowles; Sean Baldock; Mark Sesay; Jared Deacon	3:02.74
1999	United States (USA); Tony Berrian; Brandon Couts; Derrick Brew; Jerome Davis; Derrick Peterson	3:00.88	Great Britain (GBR); Richard Knowles; Geoff Dearman; Chris Rawlinson; Jared Deacon; John Stewart; Graham Beasley	3:03.95	Senegal (SEN); Ousmane Niang; Papa Serigne Diene; Jules Doumbya; Alpha Babacar Sall	3:05.45
2001	United States (USA); Geno White; Thomas Gerding; Brandon Couts; Andrew Pierce	3:02.83	Ukraine (UKR); Oleksandr Kaydash; Yevhen Zyukov; Andriy Tverdostup; Volodymyr Rybalka	3:02.87	Japan (JPN); Mitsuhiro Sato; Ken Yoshizawa; Ryuji Muraki; Masayuki Okusako	3:03.63
2003	Ukraine; Volodymyr Demchenko, Yevhen Zyukov, Hennadiy Horbenko, Andriy Tverdostup	3:03.15	Russia; Dimitry Petrov, Andrey Semenov, Sergey Babayev, Igor Vasilyev	3:04.78	Great Britain; Matthew Douglas, James Chatt, Bradley Yiend, Adam Potter	3:05.54
2005	Poland; Rafał Wieruszewski, Daniel Dąbrowski, Piotr Kędzia, Piotr Klimczak	3:02.57	Japan; Kazunori Ota, Yoshihiro Horigome, Yuki Yamaguchi, Kenji Narisako	3:03.20	Russia; Dimitry Petrov, Alexander Borshchenko, Konstantin Svechkar, Vladislav Frolov	3:03.33
2007	Poland; Witold Bańka, Piotr Klimczak, Piotr Kędzia, Daniel Dąbrowski	3:02.05	Australia; Dylan Grant, Mark Ormrod, Joel Milburn, Sean Wroe	3:02.76	Russia; Maxim Alexandrenko, Valentin Kruglyakov, Vladimir Antmanis, Dmitry Buryak	3:05.04
2009	Chris Troode; Brendan Cole; Tristan Thomas; Sean Wroe; Clay Watkins; John Burstow; Australia	3:03.67	Witold Bańka; Kacper Kozłowski; Piotr Kędzia; Rafał Wieruszewski; Piotr Wiaderek; Poland	3:05.69	Hideyuki Hirose; Yusuke Ishitsuka; Kazuaki Yoshida; Yuzo Kanemaru; Japan	3:06.46
2011	Russia (RUS); Aleksandr Sigalovskiy; Dmitry Buryak; Artem Vazhov; Valentin Kruglyakov	3:04.51	Japan (JPN); Hiroyuki Nakano; Shintaro Horie; Hideyuki Hirose; Takatoshi Abe	3:05.16	South Africa (RSA); Shane Victor; André Olivier; Pieter Beneke; Willem de Beer	3:05.61
2013	Canada (CAN); Benjamin Ayesu-Attah; Brendon Rodney; Michael Robertson; Tyler Harper	3:05.26	South Africa (RSA); Pieter Conradie; Jacques de Swardt; Pieter Beneke; Wayde van Niekerk	3:06.19	Turkey (TUR); Buğrahan Kocabeyoğlu; Halit Kılıç; Mehmet Güzel; Yavuz Can	3:06.36
2015	Dominican Republic (DOM); Luguelín Santos; Gustavo Cuesta; Juander Santos; Máximo Mercedes; Leonel Bonon*	3:05.05	Japan (JPN); Julian Jrummi Walsh; Kentaro Sato; Kazuma Ōseto; Takamasa Kitagawa; Nobuya Kato	3:07.75	Poland (POL); Mateusz Zagórski; Michał Pietrzak; Kamil Gurdak; Rafał Omelko; Robert Bryliński*	3:07.77
2017	Dominican Republic (DOM); Juander Santos; Luis Charles; Andito Charles; Luguelín Santos; Kendris Díaz*	3:04.34	United States (USA); Amere Lattin; Curtis Brown; Jordan Clarke; Kahmari Montgomery	3:06.68	Czech Republic (CZE); Jan Tesař; Lukáš Hodboď; Filip Šnejdr; Vít Müller; Martin Juránek*	3:08.14
2019	Fernando Vega; José Ricardo Jiménez; Édgar Ramírez; Valente Mendoza; Mexico	3:02.89 NR	Gardeo Isaacs; Zakithi Nene; Kefilwe Mogawane; Sokwakhana Zazini; Jon Seeliger; South Africa	3:03.23	Wiktor Suwara; Dariusz Kowaluk; Kajetan Duszyński; Patryk Dobek; Patryk Adamczyk; Poland	3:03.35

=== 20km walk ===
Games	Gold		Silver		Bronze	
1981	Maurizio Damilano (ITA)	1:26:47 GR	Carlo Mattioli (ITA)	1:28:10	Liodor Pescaru (ROM)	1:28:56
1983	Guillaume LeBlanc (CAN)	1:24:03	Maurizio Damilano (ITA)	1:24:21	Nikolay Matveyev (URS)	1:25:07
1985	Viktor Mostovik (URS)	1:25:52	Andrey Perlov (URS)	1:25:52	Guillaume LeBlanc (CAN)	1:26:22
1987	Raffaello Ducceschi (ITA)	1:25:02	Giacomo Poggi (ITA)	1:25:17	Pierluigi Fiorella (ITA)	1:26:58
1989	Walter Arena (ITA)	1:23:25 GR	Miguel Ángel Prieto (ESP)	1:23:39	Andrew Jachno (AUS)	1:23:48
1991	Robert Korzeniowski (POL)	1:24:37	Jaime Barroso (ESP)	1:25:01	Arturo Di Mezza (ITA)	1:25:09
1993	Robert Korzeniowski (POL)	1:22:01 GR	Daniel García (MEX)	1:22:58	Bernardo Segura (MEX)	1:24:11
1995	Daniel García (MEX)	1:24:11	Giovanni Perricelli (ITA)	1:24:19	Arturo Di Mezza (ITA)	1:24:33
1997	Ilya Markov (RUS)	1:25:36	Alejandro López (MEX)	1:26:00	Arturo Di Mezza (ITA)	1:26:12
1999	Alejandro López (MEX)	1:25:12	Lorenzo Civallero (ITA)	1:25:23	Daisuke Ikeshima (JPN)	1:26:01
2001	Lorenzo Civallero (ITA)	1:24:42	Juan Manuel Molina (ESP)	1:25:07	He Xiaodong (CHN)	1:25:17
2003	Stepan Yudin; Russia	1:23:34	Vladimir Potemin; Russia	1:23:50	Vasily Ivanov; Russia	1:23:55
2005	Juan Manuel Molina; Spain	1:24:06	Kim Hyun-sub; South Korea	1:24:42	Kōichirō Morioka; Japan	1:25:18
2007	Chu Yafei (CHN)	1:24:37	Park Chil-sung (KOR)	1:24:42	Kōichirō Morioka (JPN)	1:25:10
2009	Sergey Bakulin; Russia	1:20:52 UR	Andrey Ruzavin; Russia	1:21:08	Moacir Zimmermann; Brazil	1:21:35
2011	Andrey Krivov; Russia	1:24:26	Andrés Chocho; Ecuador	1:24:44	Moacir Zimmermann; Brazil	1:25:06
2013	Andrey Krivov; Russia	1:20:47 UR	Ruslan Dmytrenko; Ukraine	1:20:54	Denis Strelkov; Russia	1:21:32
2015	Dane Bird-Smith; Australia	1:21:30	Benjamin Thorne; Canada	1:21:33 SB	Daisuke Matsunaga; Japan	1:22:06
2017	Toshikazu Yamanishi; Japan	1:27:30	Julio César Salazar; Mexico	1:28:20	Fumitaka Oikawa; Japan	1:30:11
2019	Koki Ikeda; Japan	1:22:49	Masatora Kawano; Japan	1:23:20	Yuta Koga; Japan	1:23:35

=== 20km walk team ===
Games	Gold		Silver		Bronze	
2011	Russia (RUS); Andrey Krivov; Mikhail Ryzhov; Andrey Ruzavin	4:19:19	China (CHN); Cai Zelin; Yu Wei; Niu Wenbin; Yang Tao	4:24:56		
2013	Russia (RUS); Valery Filipchuk; Andrey Krivov; Konstantin Kulagov; Andrey Ruzavin; Denis Strelkov	4:04:31	Ukraine (UKR); Ruslan Dmytrenko; Ihor Hlavan; Nazar Kovalenko; Ivan Losev	4:08:09	Canada (CAN); Evan Dunfee; Iñaki Gómez; Benjamin Thorne	4:20:35
2015	Ukraine (UKR); Ihor Hlavan; Nazar Kovalenko; Ivan Banzeruk	4:17:44	China (CHN); Sun Chenggang; Yin Jiaxing; Zhang Zhi; Xie Sichao	4:26:10	Russia (RUS); Sergey Sharypov; Aleksandr Nazarov; Vladislav Maksimov	4:27:17
2017	Japan (JPN)	4:28:41	Mexico (MEX)	4:29:14	Ukraine (UKR)	4:41:34
2019	Koki Ikeda; Masatora Kawano; Yuta Koga; Japan	4:09:44	Joo Hyun-myeong; Kim Min-gyu; Kim Nak-hyun; South Korea	4:46:21	not awarded	

=== Half marathon team ===
Games	Gold		Silver		Bronze	
2011	Japan (JPN); Tsubasa Hayakawa; Hiromitsu Kakuage; Takehiro Deki; Yo Yazawa	3:20:37	China (CHN); Bian Qi; Zheng Guojun; Yan Jun; Gao Laiyuan; Yang Le	3:37:25		
2013	South Africa (RSA); Sibabalwe Mzazi; Stephen Mokoka; Xolisane Zamkele	3:12:52	Japan (JPN); Shogo Nakamura; Hiroki Yamagishi; Shota Hattori; Toshikatsu Ebina; Yuta Shitara	3:14:02	Russia (RUS); Andrey Leyman; Anatoly Rybakov; Artem Aplachkin; Yuri Chechun; Yevgeniy Pishchalov	3:16:38
2015	Japan (JPN); Yusuke Ogura; Tadashi Isshiki; Yuta Takahashi; Naoki Kudo	3:15:03	Turkey (TUR); Vedat Günen; Şeref Dirli; Aykut Taşdemir; Mehmet Akkoyun	3:26:17	South Africa (RSA); Thabang Masihleho; Sibabalwe Mzazi; Marianio Eesou; Zolani Ngqaqa; Goitsemodimo Bothobutle	3:26:29
2017	Japan (JPN)	3:19:28	South Africa (RSA)	3:31:38	Turkey (TUR)	3:34:42
2019	Akira Aizawa; Taisei Nakamura; Tatsuhiko Ito; Japan	3:16:30	Saffet Elkatmış; Ferhat Bozkurt; Ersin Tekal; Turkey	3:24:47	Jacob Simonsen; Frederik Ernst; Martin Olesen; Denmark	3:30:29

=== High jump ===
Games	Gold		Silver		Bronze	
1959	Cornel Porumb (ROM)	2.01	Vladimir Marjanović (YUG)	1.96	Raycho Aleksandrov (URS); Kazimierz Fabrykowski (POL)	1.96
1961	Valeriy Brumel (URS)	2.25	Igor Kashkarov (URS)	2.08	Milan Valenta (TCH)	2.03
1963	Valeriy Brumel (URS)	2.15	Mauro Bogliatto (ITA)	2.09	Roberto Abugattás (PER)	1.99
1965	Valeriy Skvortsov (URS)	2.14	Edward Czernik (POL)	2.07	János Medovarszki (HUN); Kuniyoshi Sugioka (JPN)	2.07
1967	Miodrag Todosijević (YUG)	2.05	Hidehiko Tomizawa (JPN)	2.05	Hiromasa Kinoshita (JPN)	2.05
1970	Valentin Gavrilov (URS)	2.18	Erminio Azzaro (ITA)	2.15	Șerban Ioan (ROM)	2.15
1973	Vladimír Malý (TCH)	2.18	István Major (HUN)	2.18	Vladimir Abramov (URS); Enzo Del Forno (ITA); Csaba Dosa (ROM); Valentin Gavrilov (URS); John Hawkins (CAN); Robert Joseph (USA); Roman Moravec (TCH)	2.15
1975	Enzo Del Forno (ITA)	2.13	István Major (HUN)	2.13	Danial Temim (YUG)	2.13
1977	Jacek Wszoła (POL)	2.22	Paul Poaniewa (FRA)	2.19	Aleksandr Grigoryev (URS)	2.19
1979	Gerd Nagel (FRG)	2.28 UR	Rolf Beilschmidt (GDR)	2.28 UR	Holger Marten (FRG)	2.26
1981	Leo Williams (USA)	2.25 m	Zhu Jianhua (CHN)	2.25 m	Gerd Nagel (FRG)	2.25 m
1983	Igor Paklin (URS)	2.31 UR	Eddy Annys (BEL)	2.29	Clarence Saunders (BER)	2.26
1985	Igor Paklin (URS)	2.41	Francisco Centelles (CUB)	2.31	Gerd Nagel (FRG)	2.26
1987	James Lott (USA)	2.30	Sašo Apostolovski (YUG)	2.30	Sorin Matei (ROM)	2.30
1989	Javier Sotomayor (CUB)	2.34 m	Hollis Conway (USA)	2.31 m	Rudolf Povarnitsyn (URS)	2.31 m
1991	Hollis Conway (USA)	2.37 m GR	Arturo Ortiz (ESP)	2.31 m	Yuriy Sergiyenko (URS)	2.25 m
1993	Tony Barton (USA)	2.30 m	Stevan Zorić (IPU)^{†}	2.30 m	Arturo Ortíz (ESP) Ruslan Stipanov (UKR)	2.27 m
1995	Dragutin Topić (YUG)	2.29 m	Wolfgang Kreißig (GER)	2.29 m	Brendan Reilly (GBR)	2.27 m
1997	Lee Jin-taek (KOR)	2.32	Charles Lefrançois (CAN)	2.32	Didier Detchénique (FRA)	2.28
1999	Ben Challenger (GBR)	2.30	Mark Boswell (CAN)	2.30	Lee Jin-taek (KOR)	2.28
2001	Aleksandr Kravtsov (RUS)	2.28	Henadz Maroz (BLR)	2.28	Tora Harris (USA)	2.26
2003	Emilian Kaszczyk; Poland	2.26	Joan Charmant; France	2.23	Ioannis Constantinou; Cyprus; Cui Kai; China; Aliaksandr Viarutsin; Belarus	2.20
2005	Aleksander Waleriańczyk; Poland	2.30	Henadz Maroz; Belarus	2.26	Martyn Bernard; Great Britain	2.23
2007	Aleksandr Shustov (RUS)	2.31	Kyriakos Ioannou (CYP)	2.26	Oleksandr Nartov (UKR)	2.26
2009	Eduard Malchenko; Russia	2.23	Michael Mason; Canada	2.23	Ivan Ilichev; Russia	2.20
2011	Bohdan Bondarenko; Ukraine	2.28	Wojciech Theiner; Poland	2.26; SB	Sergey Mudrov; Russia	2.24
2013	Sergey Mudrov; Russia	2.31	Andriy Protsenko; Ukraine	2.31	Wang Yu; China	2.28
2015	Daniil Tsyplakov; Russia	2.31 m	Matúš Bubeník; Slovakia	2.28 m PB	Hsiang Chun-hsien; Chinese Taipei	2.28 m PB
2017	Falk Wendrich; Germany	2.29 m PB	Marco Fassinotti; Italy	2.29 m SB	Hsiang Chun-hsien; Chinese Taipei	2.26 m SB
2019	Tihomir Ivanov; Bulgaria	2.30 m SB	Alperen Acet; Turkey	2.24 m	Adrijus Glebauskas; Lithuania	2.24 m SB

=== Pole vault ===
Games	Gold		Silver		Bronze	
1959	Noriaki Yasuda (JPN)	4.35	Mirko Kuzmanovic (YUG)	4.30	Bernard Balastre (FRA)	4.20
1961	Dimitar Khlebarov (BUL)	4.52	Gérard Barras (SUI)	4.52	Ihor Petrenko (URS)	4.52
1963	Hennadiy Bleznitsov (URS)	4.60	Alain Moreaux (FRA)	4.30	Bernard Balastre (FRA)	4.20
1965	John Pennel (USA)	5.00	Hennadiy Bleznitsov (URS)	4.90	Igor Feld (URS)	4.80
1967	Heinfried Engel (FRG)	5.00	Bob Seagren (USA)	4.80	Alain Moreaux (FRA)	4.80
1970	Wolfgang Nordwig (GDR)	5.46	Christos Papanikolaou (GRE)	5.42	François Tracanelli (FRA)	5.30
1973	François Tracanelli (FRA)	5.42	Yury Isakov (URS); Terry Porter (USA)	5.30		
1975	François Tracanelli (FRA)	5.20	Bruce Simpson (CAN)	5.20	Renato Dionisi (ITA)	5.10
1977	Władysław Kozakiewicz (POL)	5.55	Tadeusz Ślusarski (POL)	5.50	Vladimir Trofimenko (URS)	5.50
1979	Władysław Kozakiewicz (POL)	5.60	Philippe Houvion (FRA)	5.60	Patrick Abada (FRA)	5.55
1981	Konstantin Volkov (URS)	5.75 m GR	Vladimir Polyakov (URS)	5.70 m	Philippe Houvion (FRA)	5.65 m
1983	Konstantin Volkov (URS)	5.65	Thierry Vigneron (FRA)	5.60	Jeff Ward (USA)	5.50
1985	Radion Gataullin (URS)	5.75	Philippe Collet (FRA)	5.70	David Volz (USA)	5.60
1987	Viktor Spasov (URS)	5.65	Radion Gataullin (URS)	5.60	Scott Davis (USA)	5.60
1989	Bernhard Zintl (FRG)	5.65 m	Dean Starkey (USA)	5.60 m	Javier García (ESP)	5.40 m
1991	István Bagyula (HUN)	5.80 m GR	Bill Payne (USA)	5.60 m	Pyotr Bochkaryov (URS)	5.60 m
1993	István Bagyula (HUN)	5.70 m	Alberto Giacchetto (ITA)	5.60 m	Jean Galfione (FRA)	5.60 m
1995	István Bagyula (HUN)	5.70 m	Lawrence Johnson (USA)	5.60 m	Nuno Fernandes (POR)	5.55 m
1997	Khalid Lachheb (FRA)	5.70	Chad Harting (USA)	5.60	Werner Holl (GER)	5.55
1999	Richard Spiegelburg (GER)	5.60	Štěpán Janáček (CZE)	5.60	Romain Mesnil (FRA)	5.55
2001	Aleksandr Averbukh (ISR)	5.80	Štěpán Janáček (CZE)	5.70	Laurens Looije (NED)	5.60
2003	Oleksandr Korchmid; Ukraine	5.75	Igor Pavlov; Russia	5.65	Björn Otto; Germany; Tiberiu Agoston; Romania	5.50
2005	Björn Otto; Germany	5.80 =CR	Konstantinos Filippidis; Greece	5.75	Oleksandr Korchmid; Ukraine	5.70
2007	Alexander Straub (GER)	5.60	Leonid Kivalov (RUS)	5.60	Dmitry Starodubtsev (RUS)	5.50
2009	Aleksandr Gripich; Russia	5.60	Giorgio Piantella; Italy	5.55	Hendrik Gruber; Germany	5.45
2011	Łukasz Michalski; Poland	5.75; SB	Mateusz Didenkow; Poland; Aleksandr Gripich; Russia	5.75; PB		
2013	Sam Kendricks; United States	5.60	Seito Yamamoto; Japan	5.60	Nikita Filippov; Kazakhstan	5.50
2015	Nikita Filippov; Kazakhstan	5.50 m	Ilya Mudrov; Russia	5.50 m	Robert Sobera; Poland	5.50 m
2017	Diogo Ferreira; Portugal	5.55 m	Sergey Grigoryev; Kazakhstan	5.50 m	Claudio Stecchi; Italy	5.40 m
2019	Ernest Obiena; Philippines	5.76 m NR	Torben Blech; Germany	5.76 m PB	Ben Broeders; Belgium	5.51 m

=== Long jump ===
Games	Gold		Silver		Bronze	
1959	Attilio Bravi (ITA)	7.46	Maurizio Terenziani (ITA)	7.43	Ali Brakchi (FRA)	7.42
1961	Igor Ter-Ovanesyan (URS)	7.90	Takayuki Okazaki (JPN)	7.67	Ivan Ivanov (BUL)	7.58
1963	Igor Ter-Ovanesyan (URS)	7.95	Wolfgang Klein (FRG)	7.70	Carlos Díaz Martínez (CUB)	7.45
1965	Igor Ter-Ovanesyan (URS)	8.19	Lynn Davies (GBR)	7.89	Oleg Aleksandrov (URS)	7.53
1967	Naoki Abe (JPN)	7.71	Graham Taylor (AUS)	7.65	Pertti Pousi (FIN)	7.57
1970	Alan Lerwill (GBR)	7.91	Arnie Robinson (USA)	7.78	Geoff Hignett (GBR)	7.76
1973	Valeriy Pidluzhny (URS)	8.15	Jean-François Bonhème (FRA)	7.85	Hans Baumgartner (FRG)	7.85
1975	Grzegorz Cybulski (POL)	8.27 GR	Nenad Stekić (YUG)	8.13	Aleksey Pereverzev (URS)	7.90
1977	Nenad Stekić (YUG)	7.97	Grzegorz Cybulski (POL)	7.95	David Giralt (CUB)	7.92
1979	Valeriy Pidluzhny (URS)	8.16	Junichi Usui (JPN)	8.05	LaMonte King (USA)	7.99
1981	László Szalma (HUN)	8.23 m (w)	Liu Yuhuang (CHN)	8.11 m	Ubaldo Duany (CUB)	8.10 m
1983	Yusuf Alli (NGR)	8.21	Ralph Spry (USA)	7.91	Sergey Rodin (URS)	7.85
1985	Jaime Jefferson (CUB)	8.07	Robert Emmiyan (URS)	8.03	Stanisław Jaskułka (POL)	7.99
1987	Mike Powell (USA)	8.19	Paul Emordi (NGR)	8.11	Sergey Zaozerskiy (URS)	8.06
1989	Jaime Jefferson (CUB)	7.98 m	Vladimir Ratushkov (URS)	7.96 m	Llewellyn Starks (USA)	7.91 m
1991	Alan Turner (USA)	8.18 m (w)	George Ogbeide (NGR)	8.08 m	Bogdan Tudor (ROM)	8.01 m
1993	Kareem Streete-Thompson (USA)	8.22 m (w)	Obinna Eregbu (NGR)	8.18 m	Vitaliy Kyrylenko (UKR)	8.04 m
1995	Kirill Sosunov (RUS)	8.21 m	Georg Ackermann (GER)	8.21 m	Gregor Cankar (SLO)	8.18 m (w)
1997	Iván Pedroso (CUB)	8.40	James Beckford (JAM)	8.35	Gregor Cankar (SLO)	8.11
1999	Oleksy Lukashevych (UKR)	8.16	Luis Méliz (CUB)	8.05	Erik Nys (BEL)	7.99
2001	Miguel Pate (USA)	8.07	Stephan Louw (NAM)	8.04	Gable Garenamotse (BOT)	7.99
2003	Valeriy Vasylyev; Ukraine	8.07	Danut Simion; Romania	8.04	Andrey Bragine; Russia	8.04
2005	Volodymyr Zyuskov; Ukraine	8.06	Issam Nima; Algeria	8.02	Stefano Dacastello; Italy	7.95
2007	Robert Crowther (AUS)	8.02 PB	Chao Chih-chien (TPE)	7.95 PB	Roman Novotný (CZE)	7.88
2009	Kim Deok-hyeon; South Korea	8.41w	Ndiss Kaba Badji; Senegal	8.19	Marcin Starzak; Poland	8.10
2011	Su Xiongfeng; China	8.17	Marquise Goodwin; United States	8.03	Julian Reid; Great Britain	7.96
2013	Luis Rivera; Mexico	8.46 WL, NR, UR	Aleksandr Menkov; Russia	8.42 PB	Marcos Chuva; Portugal	8.15 SB
2015	Pavel Shalin; Russia	8.29 m	Vasiliy Kopeykin; Russia	8.13 m	Rudolph Johannes Pienaard; South Africa	7.98 m
2017	Radek Juška; Czech Republic	8.02 m	Yasser Triki; Algeria	7.96 m	Raihau Maiau; France	7.91 m
2019	Yuki Hashioka; Japan	8.01 m	Yann Randrianasolo; France	7.95 m	Darcy Roper; Australia	7.90 m

=== Triple jump ===
Games	Gold		Silver		Bronze	
1959	Oleg Ryakhovskiy (URS)	15.74	Koji Sakurai (JPN)	15.55	Hiroshi Shibata (JPN)	15.44
1961	Sorin Ioan (ROM)	15.93	Oleg Ryakhovskiy (URS)	15.85	Tomio Ota (JPN)	15.65
1963	Satoshi Shimo (JPN)	15.99	Aleksandr Zolotarev (URS)	15.94	Luis Areta (ESP)	15.80
1965	Henrik Kalocsai (HUN)	16.36	Dragán Ivanov (HUN)	16.35	Michael Sauer (FRG)	16.35
1967	Michael Sauer (FRG)	16.07	Pertti Pousi (FIN)	15.94	Giuseppe Gentile (ITA)	15.84
1970	Viktor Saneyev (URS)	17.22	Nikolay Dudkin (URS)	17.00	Jörg Drehmel (GDR)	16.93
1973	Mikhail Bariban (URS)	17.20	Viktor Saneyev (URS)	17.00	Jörg Drehmel (GDR)	16.76
1975	Michał Joachimowski (POL)	16.54	Anatoliy Piskulin (URS)	16.52	Sergey Sidorenko (URS)	16.42
1977	Anatoliy Piskulin (URS)	17.30w	Ron Livers (USA)	16.96w	Willie Banks (USA)	16.94
1979	Willie Banks (USA)	17.23	Jaak Uudmäe (URS)	17.20	Roberto Mazzucato (ITA)	16.87
1981	Zou Zhenxian (CHN)	17.32 m GR	Béla Bakosi (HUN)	16.97 m	Keith Connor (GBR)	16.88 m
1983	Ajayi Agbebaku (NGR)	17.26	Mike Conley (USA)	17.20w	John Herbert (GBR)	17.05
1985	Charles Simpkins (USA)	17.86	Alexander Yakovlev (URS)	17.43	John Herbert (GBR)	17.41
1987	Charles Simpkins (USA)	17.16	Kenny Harrison (USA)	17.07	Māris Bružiks (URS)	16.90
1989	Igor Lapshin (URS)	17.40 m	Tord Henriksson (SWE)	16.94 m	Oleg Sakirkin (URS)	16.93 m
1991	Brian Wellman (BER)	17.07 m	Chen Yanping (CHN)	16.97 m	Wu Lijun (CHN)	16.72 m (w)
1993	Tosi Fasinro (GBR)	16.91 m (w)	Oleg Sakirkin (KAZ)	16.89 m	Julian Golley (GBR)	16.88 m (w)
1995	Andrey Kurennoy (RUS)	17.30 m	Armen Martirosyan (ARM)	16.82 m	LaMark Carter (USA)	16.62 m
1997	Yoelbi Quesada (CUB)	17.35	Aliecer Urrutia (CUB)	17.11	Robert Howard (USA)	17.08
1999	Yoelbi Quesada (CUB)	17.40	Charles Friedek (GER)	17.20	Jiří Kuntoš (CZE)	16.97
2001	Kenta Bell (USA)	17.22	Marian Oprea (ROU)	17.11	Jadel Gregório (BRA)	16.92
2003	Gu Junjie; China	16.90	Viktor Yastrebov; Ukraine	16.88	Evgeny Plotnir; Russia	16.82
2005	Aleksandr Sergeyev; Russia	16.72	Steven Shalders; Great Britain	16.67	Mykola Savolaynen; Ukraine	16.67
2007	Kim Deok-hyeon (KOR)	17.02 SB	Viktor Kuznyetsov (UKR)	16.94 SB	Wu Bo (CHN)	16.64
2009	Nelson Évora; Portugal	17.22	Héctor Dairo Fuentes; Cuba	17.13	Vladimir Letnicov; Moldova	16.80
2011	Nelson Évora; Portugal	17.31; SB	Viktor Kuznyetsov; Ukraine	16.89	Yevgeniy Ektov; Kazakhstan	16.83
2013	Viktor Kuznyetsov; Ukraine	17.01	Aleksey Fyodorov; Russia	16.89	Yevgeniy Ektov; Kazakhstan	16.57
2015	Dmitry Sorokin; Russia	17.29 m PB	Hugues Fabrice Zango; Burkina Faso	16.76 m PB	Xu Xiaolong; China	16.76 m
2017	Nazim Babayev; Azerbaijan	17.01 m	Hugues Fabrice Zango; Burkina Faso	16.97 m PB	Ryoma Yamamoto; Japan	16.80 m
2019	Nazim Babayev; Azerbaijan	16.89 m	Mateus de Sá; Brazil	16.57 m SB	Alexsandro Melo; Brazil	16.57 m

=== Shot put ===
Games	Gold		Silver		Bronze	
1959	Hermann Lingnau (FRG)	17.32	Zsigmond Nagy (HUN)	17.10	Georgios Tsakanikas (GRE)	16.70
1961	Viktor Lipsnis (URS)	18.00	Dieter Urbach (FRG)	17.64	Zsigmond Nagy (HUN)	17.57
1963	Zsigmond Nagy (HUN)	18.44	Mike Lindsay (GBR)	17.76	Dieter Urbach (FRG)	17.72
1965	Randy Matson (USA)	20.31	Nikolay Karasyov (URS)	18.68	Eduard Gushchin (URS)	18.45
1967	Neal Steinhauer (USA)	19.19	Traugott Glöckler (FRG)	18.59	Antero Juntto (FIN)	17.24
1970	Hartmut Briesenick (GDR)	19.97	Valeriy Voykin (URS)	19.30	Uwe Grabe (GDR)	19.06
1973	Valeriy Voykin (URS)	19.56	Lech Gajdziński (POL)	19.07	Aleksandr Baryshnikov (URS)	19.01
1975	Bishop Dolegiewicz (CAN)	19.45	Anatoliy Yarosh (URS)	19.11	Valcho Stoev (BUL)	18.90
1977	Valcho Stoev (BUL)	19.55	Nikola Khristov (BUL)	19.44	Wolfgang Warnemünde (GDR)	18.94
1979	Udo Beyer (GDR)	20.49	Reijo Ståhlberg (FIN)	19.96	Nikola Khristov (BUL)	19.60
1981	Mike Carter (USA)	20.19 m	Detlef Mortag (GDR)	19.35 m	Dalibor Vašíček (TCH)	19.20 m
1983	Mike Carter (USA)	19.74	Zlatan Saračević (YUG)	19.66	Sergey Smirnov (URS)	19.61
1985	Remigius Machura (TCH)	21.13	Alessandro Andrei (ITA)	20.85	Ventsislav Khristov (BUL)	19.90
1987	Klaus Görmer (GDR)	20.38	Vladimir Yaryshkin (URS)	20.12	Ron Backes (USA)	20.09
1989	Lars Arvid Nilsen (NOR)	20.67 m	Mike Stulce (USA)	20.58 m	Kalman Konya (FRG)	20.37 m
1991	Aleksandr Klimenko (URS)	19.35 m	Matt Simson (GBR)	19.07 m	Jordan Reynolds (USA)	19.01 m
1993	Aleksandr Klimenko (UKR)	19.72 m	Paolo Dal Soglio (ITA)	19.64 m	Chris Volgenau (USA)	19.54 m
1995	Yuriy Bilonoh (UKR)	19.70 m	Viktor Bulat (BLR)	19.69 m	Thorsten Herbrand (GER)	18.88 m
1997	Yuriy Bilonoh (UKR)	20.34	Paolo Dal Soglio (ITA)	20.01	Brian Miller (USA)	19.72
1999	Andy Bloom (USA)	21.11 UR	Adam Nelson (USA)	20.64	Stevimir Ercegovac (CRO)	19.94
2001	Manuel Martínez Gutiérrez (ESP)	20.97	Yuriy Bilonoh (UKR)	20.16	Milan Haborák (SVK)	19.90
2003	Andrei Mikhnevich; Belarus	20.76	Pavel Lyzhyn; Belarus	20.72	Nedžad Mulabegović; Croatia	19.99
2005	Tomasz Majewski; Poland	20.60	Taavi Peetre; Estonia	20.02	Anton Lyuboslavskiy; Russia	19.40
2007	Maxim Sidorov (RUS)	20.01	Māris Urtāns (LAT)	19.38	Chang Ming-huang (TPE)	19.36
2009	Soslan Tsirikhov; Russia	19.59	Zhang Jun; China	19.58	Krzysztof Krzywosz; Poland	19.38
2011	O'Dayne Richards; Jamaica	19.93; PB	Soslan Tsirikhov; Russia	19.80	Mason Finley; United States	19.72
2013	Aleksandr Lesnoy; Russia	20.30	Inderjeet Singh; India	19.70	Valeriy Kokoev; Russia	19.65
2015	Inderjeet Singh; India	20.27 m	Andrei Gag; Romania	19.92 m	Aleksandr Bulanov; Russia	19.84 m
2017	Francisco Belo; Portugal	20.86 m PB	Konrad Bukowiecki; Poland	20.16 m	Andrei Gag; Romania	20.12 m
2019	Konrad Bukowiecki; Poland	21.54 m UR	Andrew Liskowitz; United States	20.49 m PB	Uziel Muñoz; Mexico	20.45 m

=== Discus ===
Games	Gold		Silver		Bronze	
1959	Antonios Kounadis (GRE)	53.07	Vladimir Lyakhov (URS)	52.79	Eugeniusz Wachowski (POL)	52.22
1961	Edmund Piątkowski (POL)	59.15	Kaupo Metsur (URS)	54.20	Virgil Manolescu (ROM)	52.52
1963	Gaetano Dalla Pria (ITA)	51.63	Mike Lindsay (GBR)	51.23	Dieter Urbach (FRG)	51.03
1965	Lars Haglund (SWE)	57.86	Jiří Žemba (TCH)	56.22	George Puce (CAN)	56.20
1967	Gary Carlsen (USA)	59.84	Hein-Direck Neu (FRG)	55.34	Neal Steinhauer (USA)	53.16
1970	János Murányi (HUN)	60.16	Hein-Direck Neu (FRG)	58.62	Silvano Simeon (ITA)	58.22
1973	Viktor Zhurba (URS)	61.60	Gunnar Müller (GDR)	59.72	Ferenc Tégla (HUN)	59.48
1975	Markku Tuokko (FIN)	62.94	Ferenc Tégla (HUN)	58.10	Igor Spasovkhodskiy (URS)	57.80
1977	Nikolay Vikhor (URS)	64.14	Vladimir Rayev (URS)	62.42	Wolfgang Warnemünde (GDR)	61.98
1979	Wolfgang Schmidt (GDR)	60.78	Markku Tuokko (FIN)	59.82	Antonín Wybraniec (TCH)	58.32
1981	Armin Lemme (GDR)	65.90 m GR	Wolfgang Warnemünde (GDR)	63.54 m	Ion Zamfirache (ROM)	63.40 m
1983	Luis Delís (CUB)	69.46 UR	Dariusz Juzyszyn (POL)	63.32	Marco Bucci (ITA)	60.62
1985	Luis Delís (CUB)	66.84	Vaclavas Kidykas (URS)	63.12	Juan Martínez Brito (CUB)	63.02
1987	Randy Heisler (USA)	62.38	Vaclavas Kidykas (URS)	61.72	Kostas Georgakopoulos (GRE)	60.54
1989	Kamy Keshmiri (USA)	65.40 m	Erik de Bruin (NED)	64.40 m	Roberto Moya (CUB)	63.78 m
1991	Adewale Olukoju (NGR)	61.48 m	Anthony Washington (USA)	61.46 m	Alexis Elizalde (CUB)	59.04 m
1993	Alexis Elizalde (CUB)	62.98 m	Adewale Olukoju (NGR)	62.96 m	Nick Sweeney (IRL)	62.52 m
1995	Vitaliy Sidorov (UKR)	62.16 m	Frits Potgieter (RSA)	61.38 m	Diego Fortuna (ITA)	61.16 m
1997	Vladimir Dubrovshchik (BLR)	66.40	Andy Bloom (USA)	63.12	Doug Reynolds (USA)	62.76
1999	Frantz Kruger (RSA)	66.90	Andy Bloom (USA)	64.68	Doug Reynolds (USA)	63.65
2001	Aleksander Tammert (EST)	65.19	Leonid Cherevko (BLR)	63.15	Aliaksandr Malashevich (BLR)	62.81
2003	Wu Tao; China	62.32	Andrzej Krawczyk; Poland	60.70	Emeka Udechuku; Great Britain	60.44
2005	Gerd Kanter; Estonia	65.29	Omar Ahmed El Ghazaly; Egypt	62.28	Gábor Máté; Hungary	61.91
2007	Gerhard Mayer (AUT)	61.55	Omar Ahmed El Ghazaly (EGY)	60.89	Märt Israel (EST)	60.32
2009	Mohammad Samimi; Iran	65.33	Mahmoud Samimi; Iran	64.67	Markus Münch; Germany	63.76
2011	Märt Israel; Estonia	64.07	Przemysław Czajkowski; Poland	63.62	Ronald Julião; Brazil	63.30; NR
2013	Ronald Julião; Brazil	63.54	Giovanni Faloci; Italy	62.23	Gleb Sidorchenko; Russia	62.16
2015	Philip Milanov; Belgium	64.15 m	Matthew Denny; Australia	62.58 m PB	Andrius Gudžius; Lithuania	62.54 m
2017	Reginald Jagers III; United States	61.24 m	Alin Firfirică; Romania	61.13 m	Róbert Szikszai; Hungary	60.91 m
2019	Matthew Denny; Australia	65.27 m	Alin Firfirică; Romania	63.74 m	Henning Prüfer; Germany	63.52 m PB

=== Hammer throw ===
Games	Gold		Silver		Bronze	
1959	Gyula Zsivótzky (HUN)	63.65	Anatoliy Samotsvetov (URS)	63.61	Krešimir Račić (YUG)	62.32
1961	Gyula Zsivótzky (HUN)	64.62	Gennadiy Kondrashov (URS)	63.38	John Lawlor (IRL)	63.33
1963	Gennadiy Kondrashov (URS)	65.76	Gyula Zsivótzky (HUN)	65.72	Masatoshi Wakabayashi (JPN)	60.90
1965	Gyula Zsivótzky (HUN)	67.74	Gennadiy Kondrashov (URS)	65.76	Yuriy Bakarinov (URS)	63.74
1967	Yoshihisa Ishida (JPN)	64.94	Heiner Liewald (FRG)	62.18	Shigenobu Murofushi (JPN)	61.76
1970	Jochen Sachse (GDR)	72.34	Vasiliy Khmelevskiy (URS)	68.54	Vladimir Ambrosyev (URS)	66.80
1973	Valentin Dmitriyenko (URS)	72.42	Aleksey Spiridonov (URS)	71.82	Uwe Beyer (FRG)	71.18
1975	Aleksey Spiridonov (URS)	73.82	Walter Schmidt (FRG)	72.00	Yuriy Sedykh (URS)	71.32
1977	Emanuil Dyulgerov (BUL)	73.50	Yuriy Sedykh (URS)	72.42	Aleksandr Kozlov (URS)	72.40
1979	Klaus Ploghaus (FRG)	75.74 UR	Manfred Hüning (FRG)	75.68	Yuriy Sedykh (URS)	75.54
1981	Klaus Ploghaus (FRG)	77.74 m GR	Jüri Tamm (URS)	76.54 m	Igor Nikulin (URS)	75.24 m
1983	Jüri Tamm (URS)	76.82	Robert Weir (GBR)	74.10	Yuriy Pastukhov (URS)	73.38
1985	Heinz Weis (FRG)	76.00	Lucio Serrani (ITA)	74.08	Igor Nikulin (URS)	74.04
1987	Igor Astapkovich (URS)	78.46	Heinz Weis (FRG)	76.98	Lucio Serrani (ITA)	75.70
1989	Igor Astapkovich (URS)	80.56 m GR	Heinz Weis (FRG)	79.58 m	Ken Flax (USA)	75.86 m
1991	Ken Flax (USA)	76.46 m	Valeriy Gubkin (URS)	76.28 m	Heinz Weis (GER)	75.62 m
1993	Vadim Kolesnik (UKR)	77.00 m	Balázs Kiss (HUN)	76.88 m	Christophe Épalle (FRA)	76.80 m
1995	Balázs Kiss (HUN)	79.74 m	Oleksandr Krykun (UKR)	77.06 m	Sergey Gavrilov (RUS)	75.50 m
1997	Balázs Kiss (HUN)	79.42	Vadim Kolesnik (UKR)	77.16	Ilya Konovalov (RUS)	76.16
1999	Zsolt Németh (HUN)	80.40	Hristos Polihroniou (GRE)	79.83	Vladyslav Piskunov (UKR)	78.61
2001	Nicola Vizzoni (ITA)	78.41	Vladyslav Piskunov (UKR)	77.99	Adrián Annus (HUN)	77.73
2003	Ivan Tsikhan; Belarus	82.77 CR	Péter Botfa; Hungary	74.41	David Söderberg; Finland	72.84
2005	Vadim Devyatovskiy; Belarus	79.13	Eşref Apak; Turkey	76.18	Valeriy Sviatokha; Belarus	74.71
2007	Aliaksandr Vashchyla (BLR)	76.94	Aliaksandr Kazulka (BLR)	74.52	Igor Vinichenko (RUS)	73.94
2009	Yury Shayunou; Belarus	76.92	Jim Steacy; Canada	74.88	Aleksey Sokirskiy; Ukraine	73.73
2011	Paweł Fajdek; Poland	78.14	Marcel Lomnický; Slovakia	73.90	Lorenzo Povegliano; Italy	73.39
2013	Paweł Fajdek; Poland	79.99	Marcel Lomnický; Slovakia	78.73	Sergej Litvinov; Russia	78.08
2015	Paweł Fajdek; Poland	80.05 m	Pavel Bareisha; Belarus	75.75 m	Siarhei Kalamoyets; Belarus	74.68 m
2017	Paweł Fajdek; Poland	79.16 m	Pavel Bareisha; Belarus	77.98 m	Serghei Marghiev; Moldova	74.98 m
2019	Özkan Baltacı; Turkey	75.98 m SB	Serhiy Reheda; Ukraine	74.27 m	Taylor Campbell; Great Britain	73.86 m PB

=== Javelin ===
Games	Gold		Silver		Bronze	
1959	Hermann Salomon (FRG)	75.95	Gergely Kulcsár (HUN)	75.80	Alexandru Bizim (ROM)	72.81
1961	Gergely Kulcsár (HUN)	77.65	Janusz Sidło (POL)	77.48	Rolf Herings (FRG)	75.67
1963	Jānis Lūsis (URS)	79.77	Hermann Salomon (FRG)	77.78	Gergely Kulcsár (HUN)	77.62
1965	Rolf Herings (FRG)	79.26	Vanni Rodeghiero (ITA)	77.60	Lennart Hedmark (SWE)	76.94
1967	Dave Travis (GBR)	76.64	Michel Pougheon (FRA)	70.34	Hisao Yamamoto (JPN)	67.72
1970	Miklós Németh (HUN)	81.94	József Csík (HUN)	80.32	Zygmunt Jałoszyński (POL)	79.84
1973	Jānis Zirnis (URS)	80.08	Dmitriy Sitnikov (URS)	79.65	Anthony Hall (USA)	78.36
1975	Gheorghe Megelea (ROM)	81.30 GR	Bill Schmidt (USA)	80.20	Ivan Morgol (URS)	78.44
1977	Vasiliy Yershov (URS)	81.60	David Ottley (GBR)	81.14	Valentin Dzhonev (BUL)	79.76
1979	Helmut Schreiber (FRG)	88.68 UR	Arto Härkönen (FIN)	87.10	Heino Puuste (URS)	82.62
1981	Dainis Kūla (URS)	89.52 m GR	Gerald Weiß (GDR)	87.80 m	Heino Puuste (URS)	87.22 m
1983	Dainis Kūla (URS)	87.80	Helmut Schreiber (FRG)	84.12	Stanisław Górak (POL)	83.20
1985	Dumitru Negoiță (ROM)	84.62	Wolfram Gambke (FRG)	84.46	Jean-Paul Lakafia (FRA)	82.96
1987	Marek Kaleta (URS)	81.42	Sejad Krdžalić (YUG)	80.26	Volker Hadwich (GDR)	78.82
1989	Steve Backley (GBR)	85.60 m GR	Pascal Lefèvre (FRA)	82.56 m	Marko Hyytiäinen (FIN)	81.52 m
1991	Steve Backley (GBR)	87.42 m GR	Vladimir Ovchinnikov (URS)	80.60 m	Knut Hempel (GER)	77.90 m
1993	Louis Fouché (RSA)	79.64 m	Ed Kaminski (USA)	77.52 m	Mika Parviainen (FIN)	77.14 m
1995	Zhang Lianbiao (CHN)	79.30 m	Gregor Högler (AUT)	77.52 m	Andrey Uglov (UKR)	76.16 m
1997	Marius Corbett (RSA)	86.50	Emeterio González (CUB)	83.48	Gregor Högler (AUT)	81.12
1999	Ēriks Rags (LAT)	83.78	Gregor Högler (AUT)	82.63	Isbel Luaces (CUB)	82.18
2001	Ēriks Rags (LAT)	82.72	Isbel Luaces (CUB)	81.68	Gergely Horváth (HUN)	80.03
2003	Igor Janik; Poland	76.83	Esko Mikkola; Finland	75.82	William Hamlyn-Harris; Australia	75.50
2005	Ainārs Kovals; Latvia	80.67	Tero Järvenpää; Finland	79.61	Stefan Müller; Switzerland	78.56
2007	Vadims Vasiļevskis (LAT)	83.92 SB	Igor Janik (POL)	82.28 SB	Ainārs Kovals (LAT)	82.23
2009	Ainārs Kovals; Latvia	81.58	Stuart Farquhar; New Zealand	79.48	Park Jae-myong; South Korea	79.29
2011	Fatih Avan; Turkey	83.79	Roman Avramenko; Ukraine	81.42	Igor Janik; Poland	79.65
2013	Dmitry Tarabin; Russia	83.11	John Robert Oosthuizen; South Africa	81.63	Fatih Avan; Turkey	81.24
2015	Tanel Laanmäe; Estonia	81.71 m	Huang Shih-feng; Chinese Taipei	81.27 m	Zigismunds Sirmais; Latvia	79.37 m SB
2017	Cheng Chao-tsun; Chinese Taipei	91.36 m UR, AS	Andreas Hofmann; Germany	91.07 m PB	Huang Shih-feng; Chinese Taipei	86.64 m PB
2019	Andrian Mardare; Moldova	82.40 m	Edis Matusevičius; Lithuania	80.07 m	Ma Qun; China	79.62 m

=== Decathlon ===
Games	Gold		Silver		Bronze	
1961	Vasili Kuznetsov (URS)	7918	Milan Kuzmanov (BUL)	6226	Klaus-Dieter Röper (FRG)	6209
1963	Manfred Pflugbeil (FRG)	6487	Gerd Lossdörfer (FRG)	6102	Only two finishers	
1965	Bill Toomey (USA)	7566	József Bakai (HUN)	7443	Manfred Pflugbeil (FRG)	7413
1967	Hans-Joachim Walde (FRG)	7819	Jörg Mattheis (FRG)	7486	Bernard Castang (FRA)	7444
1970	Mykola Avilov (URS)	7803	Lennart Hedmark (SWE)	7783	Vladimir Shcherbatykh (URS)	7551
1973	Ryszard Skowronek (POL)	7965	Mykola Avilov (URS)	7903	Rudolf Sigert (URS)	7825
1975	Sepp Zeilbauer (AUT)	7857	Philippe Bobin (FRA)	7568	Winfried Hartweck (FRG)	7382
1977	Sepp Zeilbauer (AUT)	8097	Valeriu Caceanov (URS)	7958	Rumen Petrov (BUL)	7949
1979	Sepp Zeilbauer (AUT)	8203 UR	Jürgen Hingsen (FRG)	8033	Heinz Antretter (FRG)	7868
1981	Aleksandr Shablenko (URS)	8055 pts	Sergey Zhelanov (URS)	8013 pts	Georg Werthner (AUT)	7825 pts
1983	Dave Steen (CAN)	8205w	Herbert Peter (FRG)	8160w	Georg Werthner (AUT)	7905
1985	Mike Ramos (USA)	8071	Valter Külvet (URS)	7971	Michael Neugebauer (FRG)	7895
1987	Siegfried Wentz (FRG)	8348	Jim Connolly (USA)	8026	Patrick Gellens (FRA)	7786
1989	Dave Johnson (USA)	8216 pts	Mykhailo Medvid (URS)	8062 pts	Dezsõ Szabó (HUN)	8031 pts
1991	Steve Fritz (USA)	7874 pts	Kris Szabadhegy (USA)	7719 pts	Anthony Brannen (GBR)	7656 pts
1993	Sébastien Levicq (FRA)	7874 pts	Indrek Kaseorg (EST)	7864 pts	Darrin Steele (USA)	7653 pts
1995	Dezsõ Szabó (HUN)	8051 pts	Sebastian Chmara (POL)	8014 pts	Dmitriy Sukhomazov (BLR)	7971 pts
1997	Roman Šebrle (CZE)	8380	Kamil Damašek (CZE)	8072	Marcel Dost (NED)	7899
1999	Raúl Duany (CUB)	8050	Stephen Moore (USA)	8028	Benjamin Jensen (DEN)	7982
2001	Raúl Duany (CUB)	8069	Volodymyr Mykhailenko (UKR)	8019	Qi Haifeng (CHN)	8019
2003	Romain Barras; France	8196	Indrek Turi; Estonia	8122	Nikolay Tishchenko; Russia	7911
2005	Aliaksandr Parkhomenka; Belarus	8051	François Gourmet; Belgium	7792	Nadir El Fassi; France	7724
2007	Jacob Minah (GER)	8099 PB	Hans Van Alphen (BEL)	8047 PB	Carlos Chinin (BRA)	7920
2009	Mikalai Shubianok; Belarus	7960	Brent Newdick; New Zealand	7874	Attila Szabó; Hungary	7748
2011	Vasiliy Kharlamov; Russia	8166	Gaël Querin; France	7857	Mikhail Logvinenko; Russia	7835
2013	Thomas Van der Plaetsen; Belgium	8164	Sergey Sviridov; Russia	7939	Brent Newdick; New Zealand	7611
2015	Thomas Van der Plaetsen; Belgium	7952 pts	Bastien Auzeil; France	7913 pts	Rene Strauss; Germany	7791 pts
2017	Kyle Cranston; Australia	7687 SB	Juuso Hassi; Finland	7566	Aaron Booth; New Zealand	7523 PB
2019	Aaron Booth; New Zealand	7827 pts PB	Alexander Diamond; Australia	7593 pts PB	Sutthisak Singkhon; Thailand	7511 pts

=== Pentathlon ===
Games	Gold		Silver		Bronze	
1959	Vasili Kuznetsov (URS)	4006	Hermann Salomon (FRG)	3530	Miloš Vojtek (TCH)	3048
