= Athletics at the 2001 Summer Universiade – Men's 4 × 400 metres relay =

The men's 4 × 400 metres relay event at the 2001 Summer Universiade was held at the Workers Stadium in Beijing, China between 30 August and 1 September.

The winning margin was 0.04 seconds which as of 2024 remains the narrowest winning margin for the men's 4 × 400 metres relay at these games since the introduction of fully automatic timing and the only time this event was won by less than a tenth of a second at these games.

== Results ==
=== Heats ===
Rank	Heat	Nation	Athletes	Time	Notes
1	2	United States	Andrew Pierce, Geno White, Brandon Couts, Thomas Gerding	3:05.18	Q
2	1	Ukraine	Andriy Tverdostup, Volodymyr Rybalka, Yevhen Zyukov, Oleksandr Kaydash	3:06.15	Q
3	2	Russia	Oleg Mishukov, Aleksandr Ladeyshchikov, Dmitriy Forshev, Aleksandr Usov	3:06.59	Q
4	1	South Africa	Johan Cronje, Corné du Plessis, Adriaan Botha, Brian Erasmus	3:07.26	Q
5	2	Netherlands	Bob Keus, Patrick van Balkom, Julien Hagen, Bram Som	3:07.52	Q
6	1	Japan	Yoshihiro Chiba, Mitsuhiro Sato, Ryuji Muraki, Ken Yoshizawa	3:07.82	Q
7	2	Australia	Frazer Dowling, David Flowers, Kris McCarthy, Clinton Hill	3:08.19	q
8	1	Nigeria	Kayode Isijola, Bolaji Lawal, Poploola Toope, Popoola Toope	3:13.12	q
9	2	Sri Lanka	Vajira Kularatne, Ravindra Jayasinghe, Chadana Wickramarachchi, Kulan Arunajith	3:23.20	

=== Final ===
Rank	Nation	Athletes	Time	Notes
1st place, gold medalist(s)	United States	Thomas Gerding, Geno White, Brandon Couts, Andrew Pierce	3:02.83	
2nd place, silver medalist(s)	Ukraine	Andriy Tverdostup, Yevhen Zyukov, Oleksandr Kaydash, Volodymyr Rybalka	3:02.87	
3rd place, bronze medalist(s)	Japan	Mitsuhiro Sato, Ken Yoshizawa, Ryuji Muraki, Masayuki Okusako	3:03.63	
4	Australia	David Flowers, Clinton Hill, Paul Pearce, Tim Williams	3:04.51	
5	South Africa	Adriaan Botha, Alwyn Myburgh, Liod Kgopong, Martin Willemse	3:05.23	
6	Netherlands	Bram Som, Patrick van Balkom, Julien Hagen, Bob Keus	3:06.30	
7	Russia	Aleksandr Ladeyshchikov, Oleg Mishukov, Aleksandr Usov, Dmitriy Forshev	3:06.83	
8	Nigeria	Bolaji Lawal, Popoola Toope, Poploola Toope, Kayode Isijola	3:22.14	
