= Athletics at the 2001 Summer Universiade – Men's 400 metres =

The men's 400 metres event at the 2001 Summer Universiade was held at the Workers Stadium in Beijing, China on 27, 28, and 29 August.

== Medalists ==
Gold	Silver	Bronze
Andrew Pierce; United States	Clinton Hill; Australia	Andriy Tverdostup; Ukraine

== Results ==
=== Heats ===
27 August

Rank	Heat	Athlete	Nationality	Time	Notes
1	1	Clinton Hill	Australia	46.61	Q
2	5	Robert Daly	Ireland	46.93	Q
3	5	Andriy Tverdostup	Ukraine	47.01	Q
4	1	Amin Badany Goma'a	Egypt	47.11	Q
5	4	Matuupi Katjiyongua	Namibia	47.14	Q
6	1	Liod Kgopong	South Africa	47.34	Q
7	4	Mitsuhiro Sato	Japan	47.42	Q
8	1	Oleksandr Kaydash	Ukraine	47.82	Q
9	5	Paul Pearce	Australia	47.96	Q
10	3	Ryuji Muraki	Japan	48.01	Q
11	2	Andrew Pierce	United States	48.14	Q
12	5	Adriaan Botha	South Africa	48.16	Q
13	1	Arden Kelly	Puerto Rico	48.28	q
14	3	Juliën Hagen	Netherlands	48.41	Q
15	3	Dmitriy Chumichkin	Azerbaijan	48.42	Q
16	2	Oleg Mishukov	Russia	48.45	Q
17	4	Thomas Gerding	United States	48.63	Q
18	4	Aleksandr Usov	Russia	48.90	Q
19	5	Sylvester Nauta	Namibia	49.06	q
20	2	Paul McKee	Ireland	49.17	Q
21	2	Bob Keus	Netherlands	49.40	Q
22	5	Ng Boon Keng	Singapore	49.61	q
23	3	Le Minh Chinh	Vietnam	49.62	Q
24	2	Teu Koon Kiat	Singapore	49.84	q
25	3	Said Al-Abadi	Oman	50.47	
26	3	Chan Chi Hong	Hong Kong	50.57	
27	4	Muzi Mabuza	Swaziland	50.66	
28	2	Mansour Al-Anbary	Oman	50.95	
29	1	Roberto Gómez	Costa Rica	51.23	
30	3	Basheer Al-Khewani	Yemen	52.46	
31	1	Mohamed Mukul Hossain	Bangladesh	52.55	
32	4	Chan San Lam	Macau	52.69	
33	2	Rony Georges	Lebanon	52.78	NJR
34	5	Wai Fong Leong	Macau	55.02	
35	4	Michael Banda	Malawi	55.17	
36	3	C. K. B. Ratnayake	Sri Lanka	55.51	
37	4	Ibrahima Yansane	Guinea	1:12.49	
38	1	Ibrahima Tounkara	Guinea	1:12.98	

=== Quarterfinals ===
27 August

Rank	Heat	Athlete	Nationality	Time	Notes
1	1	Andrew Pierce	United States	46.41	Q
2	2	Andriy Tverdostup	Ukraine	46.42	Q
3	1	Mitsuhiro Sato	Japan	46.43	Q
4	1	Robert Daly	Ireland	46.53	Q
5	3	Ryuji Muraki	Japan	46.73	Q
6	3	Oleg Mishukov	Russia	46.77	Q
7	1	Oleksandr Kaydash	Ukraine	46.85	Q
8	2	Clinton Hill	Australia	46.87	Q
9	2	Amin Badany Goma'a	Egypt	46.88	Q
10	3	Paul McKee	Ireland	46.98	Q
11	2	Matuupi Katjiyongua	Namibia	47.03	Q
12	3	Thomas Gerding	United States	47.15	Q
13	3	Adriaan Botha	South Africa	47.26	Q
14	2	Aleksandr Usov	Russia	47.49	Q
15	3	Arden Kelly	Puerto Rico	47.57	q
16	1	Liod Kgopong	South Africa	47.59	Q
17	3	Juliën Hagen	Netherlands	47.73	
18	2	Dmitriy Chumichkin	Azerbaijan	48.25	
19	2	Bob Keus	Netherlands	48.76	
20	1	Sylvester Nauta	Namibia	48.96	
21	2	Teu Koon Kiat	Singapore	49.96	
22	1	Ng Boon Keng	Singapore	50.22	
	1	Le Minh Chinh	Vietnam	?	
	3	Paul Pearce	Australia	DNS	

=== Semifinals ===
28 August

Rank	Heat	Athlete	Nationality	Time	Notes
1	1	Clinton Hill	Australia	45.77	Q
2	1	Andriy Tverdostup	Ukraine	45.95	Q
3	2	Andrew Pierce	United States	46.16	Q
4	2	Mitsuhiro Sato	Japan	46.48	Q
5	1	Ryuji Muraki	Japan	46.60	Q
6	2	Oleksandr Kaydash	Ukraine	46.60	Q
7	2	Amin Badany Goma'a	Egypt	46.65	Q
8	1	Thomas Gerding	United States	47.13	Q
9	2	Paul McKee	Ireland	47.21	
10	1	Matuupi Katjiyongua	Namibia	47.58	
11	2	Oleg Mishukov	Russia	47.90	
12	2	Arden Kelly	Puerto Rico	48.04	
13	2	Adriaan Botha	South Africa	48.05	
14	1	Liod Kgopong	South Africa	48.08	
	1	Robert Daly	Ireland	DQ	
	1	Aleksandr Usov	Russia	DNF	

=== Final ===
29 August

Rank	Athlete	Nationality	Time	Notes
1st place, gold medalist(s)	Andrew Pierce	United States	45.34	
2nd place, silver medalist(s)	Clinton Hill	Australia	45.63	
3rd place, bronze medalist(s)	Andriy Tverdostup	Ukraine	45.78	
4	Amin Badany Goma'a	Egypt	46.27	
5	Oleksandr Kaydash	Ukraine	46.46	
6	Ryuji Muraki	Japan	46.60	
7	Mitsuhiro Sato	Japan	46.99	
8	Thomas Gerding	United States	47.09	
