= Athletics at the 1963 Summer Universiade – Men's decathlon =

Sports competition in Porto Alegre, Brazil

The men's decathlon event at the 1963 Summer Universiade was held at the Estádio Olímpico Monumental in Porto Alegre, Brazil in September 1963.

== Results ==
Rank	Athlete	Nationality	100m	LJ	SP	HJ	400m	110m H	DT	PV	JT	1500m	Points	Notes
1st place, gold medalist(s)	Manfred Pflugbeil	West Germany	11.7	7.04	13.23	1.86	51.2	15.2	37.02	3.50	52.45	4:52.7	6487	
2nd place, silver medalist(s)	Gerd Lössdorfer	West Germany											6102	
	Guenther Stobaus	Brazil											DNF	
	Marseno Martins	Brazil											DNF	
