= Athletics at the 2001 Summer Universiade =

- Dates: 27 August – 1 September
- Host city: Beijing, China
- Venue: Olympic Sports Centre
- Level: Senior
- Events: 45
- Records set: 5 Universiade records

At the athletics competition at the 2001 Summer Universiade were held in Beijing, People's Republic of China between 27 August and 1 September. A total of 45 events were contested, of which 23 by male and 22 by female athletes. The host country, China, took the most gold medals (9) and the most medals overall (16). The United States were a close second with a total of 8 golds. Five Universiade records were broken during the course of the athletics competition.

Amongst the gold medallists for the host country were Dong Yanmei, who won golds in the women's 5000 and 10,000 metres races, and 18-year-old Liu Xiang in the 110 metres hurdles. It was Liu's first gold on a world stage and he became the 2004 Olympic champion in world record time three years later. As well as Dong, three other athletes took medals in multiple individual events: Gennadiy Chernovol won silver in both the 100 and 200 metres for Kazakhstan, Swiss athlete Christian Belz won two bronze medals via the 5000 m and steeplechase races, and Brazilian Maurren Maggi took the women's long jump gold and a silver medal in the 100 metres hurdles.

== Records ==
Name	Event	Country	Record	Type
Alwyn Myburgh	400 metres hurdles	South Africa	48.09	UR
Gao Shuying	Pole vault	China	4.52	UR
Tatyana Lebedeva	Triple jump	Russia	14.81	UR
Osleidys Menéndez	Javelin throw	Cuba	69.82	UR
Gao Hongmiao	10 km racewalk	China	43:20	UR

Key:	WR — World record • AR — Area record • UR — Universiade record • NR — National record

== Medal summary ==
=== Men ===
Event	Gold		Silver		Bronze	
100 metres	Marcus Brunson (USA)	10.15	Gennadiy Chernovol (KAZ)	10.29	Chris Lambert (GBR)	10.38
200 metres	Marcin Urbaś (POL)	20.56	Gennadiy Chernovol (KAZ)	20.57	Corné du Plessis (RSA)	20.58
400 metres	Andrew Pierce (USA)	45.34	Clinton Hill (AUS)	45.63	Andriy Tverdostup (UKR)	45.78
800 metres	Khalid Tighazouine (MAR)	1:45.27	Derrick Peterson (USA)	1:45.49	Otukile Lekote (BOT)	1:45.63
1500 metres	Pedro Antonio Esteso (ESP)	3:43.98	Gareth Turnbull (IRL)	3:44.21	Aléxis Abraham (FRA)	3:44.48
5000 metres	Serhiy Lebid (UKR)	13:44.24	Mikhayil Yeginov (RUS)	13:46.63	Christian Belz (SUI)	13:48.21
10,000 metres	John Kanyi (KEN)	28:27.42	Ignacio Cáceres (ESP)	28:43.63	Kazuyoshi Tokumoto (JPN)	28:47.34
110 metres hurdles	Liu Xiang (CHN)	13.33	Elmar Lichtenegger (AUT)	13.36	Robert Kronberg (SWE)	13.40
400 metres hurdles	Alwyn Myburgh (RSA)	48.09 UR	Yevgeniy Meleshenko (KAZ)	48.46	Chen Tien-Wen (TPE)	48.63
3000 metres steeplechase	Anthony Famiglietti (USA)	8:21.97	Jakub Czaja (POL)	8:23.00	Christian Belz (SUI)	8:24.46
4 × 100 metres relay	Japan (JPN); Shingo Kawabata; Kenji Nara; Yusuke Omae; Masayuki Okusako	38.77	United States (USA); Gerald Williams; Marcus Brunson; Josh Norman; Kaaron Conwright; Josephus Howard	39.14	Italy (ITA); Andrea Rabino; Massimiliano Donati; Andrea Colombo; Luca Verdecchia	39.35
4 × 400 metres relay	United States (USA); Thomas Gerding; Geno White; Brandon Couts; Andrew Pierce	3:02.83	Ukraine (UKR); Andriy Tverdostup; Yevhen Zyukov; Oleksandr Kaydash; Volodymyr Rybalka	3:02.87	Japan (JPN); Mitsuhiro Sato; Ken Yoshizawa; Ryuji Muraki; Masayuki Okusako; Yoshihiro Chiba	3:03.63
Half marathon	Masakazu Fujiwara (JPN)	1:04:12	Wodage Zvadya (ISR)	1:04:30	Ryoji Matsushita (JPN)	1:04:53
20 kilometres walk	Lorenzo Civallero (ITA)	1:24:42	Juan Manuel Molina (ESP)	1:25:07	He Xiaodong (CHN)	1:25:17
High jump	Aleksandr Kravtsov (RUS)	2.28	Gennadiy Moroz (BLR)	2.28	Tora Harris (USA)	2.26
Pole vault	Aleksandr Averbukh (ISR)	5.80	Štěpán Janáček (CZE)	5.70	Laurens Looije (NED)	5.60
Long jump	Miguel Pate (USA)	8.07	Stephan Louw (NAM)	8.04	Gable Garenamotse (BOT)	7.99
Triple jump	Kenta Bell (USA)	17.22	Marian Oprea (ROU)	17.11	Jadel Gregório (BRA)	16.92
Shot put	Manuel Martínez Gutiérrez (ESP)	20.97	Yuriy Bilonoh (UKR)	20.16	Milan Haborák (SVK)	19.90
Discus throw	Aleksander Tammert (EST)	65.19	Leonid Cherevko (BLR)	63.15	Aleksandr Malashevich (BLR)	62.81
Hammer throw	Nicola Vizzoni (ITA)	78.41	Vladislav Piskunov (UKR)	77.99	Adrián Annus (HUN)	77.73
Javelin throw	Ēriks Rags (LAT)	82.72	Isbel Luaces (CUB)	81.68	Gergely Horváth (HUN)	80.03
Decathlon	Raúl Duany (CUB)	8069	Volodymyr Mykhailenko (UKR)	8019	Qi Haifeng (CHN)	8019

=== Women ===
Event	Gold		Silver		Bronze	
100 metres	Abi Oyepitan (GBR)	11.42	Zeng Xiujun (CHN)	11.58	Mireille Donders (SUI)	11.59
200 metres	Li Xuemei (CHN)	22.86	Kim Gevaert (BEL)	22.94	Natallia Safronnikava (BLR)	23.16
400 metres	Demetria Washington (USA)	51.22	Otilia Ruicu (ROU)	51.82	Miki Barber (USA)	51.92
800 metres	Brigita Langerholc (SLO)	2:00.96	Nedia Semedo (POR)	2:01.64	Tatyana Rodionova (RUS)	2:01.68
1500 metres	Süreyya Ayhan (TUR)	4:06.91	Maria Cristina Grosu (ROU)	4:08.84	Sabina Fischer (SUI)	4:08.93
5000 metres	Dong Yanmei (CHN)	15:30.28	Tatyana Khmeleva (RUS)	15:43.18	Yoshiko Fujinaga (JPN)	15:43.94
10,000 metres	Dong Yanmei (CHN)	32:45.14	Yoshiko Fujinaga (JPN)	32:53.55	Yukiko Akaba (JPN)	32:57.35
100 metres hurdles	Su Yiping (CHN)	12.95	Maurren Maggi (BRA)	13.13	Jacquie Munro (AUS)	13.17
400 metres hurdles	Tasha Danvers (GBR)	54.94	Małgorzata Pskit (POL)	55.27	Sonia Brito (AUS)	55.72
4 × 100 metres relay	China (CHN); Li Xuemei; Chen Yueqin; Zeng Xiujun; Yan Jiankui	43.72	Brazil (BRA); Lucimar Moura; Maíla Machado; Rosemar Coelho Neto; Maurren Maggi; Maria Laura Almirão	44.13	France (FRA); Katia Benth; Sylvanie Morandais; Céline Thelamon; Reïna-Flor Okori	44.24
4 × 400 metres relay	United States (USA); Me'Lisa Barber; Carolyn Jackson; Demetria Washington; Mikele Barber	3:28.04	Great Britain (GBR); Tracey Duncan; Jennifer Meadows; Tasha Danvers; Lee McConnell	3:30.40	Belarus (BLR); Sviatlana Usovich; Natallia Safronnikava; Hanna Kazak; Iryna Khliustava	3:30.65
Half marathon	Ham Bong-Sil (PRK)	1:15:24	Miki Oyama (JPN)	1:15:31	Kim Chang-Ok (PRK)	1:15:36
10 kilometres walk	Gao Hongmiao (CHN)	43:20 UR	Susana Feitor (POR)	43:40	Wang Liping (CHN)	44:01
High jump	Vita Palamar (UKR)	1.96	Nicole Forrester (CAN)	1.94	Nevena Lendjel (CRO)	1.91
Pole vault	Gao Shuying (CHN)	4.52 UR	Sabine Schulte (GER)	4.35	Šárka Mládková (CZE)	4.20
Long jump	Maurren Maggi (BRA)	6.83	Guan Yingnan (CHN)	6.56	Kumiko Ikeda (JPN)	6.52
Triple jump	Tatyana Lebedeva (RUS)	14.81 UR	Natallia Safronava (BLR)	14.57	Yelena Oleynikova (RUS)	14.39w
Shot put	Yumileidi Cumbá (CUB)	18.90	Lee Myung-Sun (KOR)	18.79	Katarzyna Żakowicz (POL)	18.31
Discus throw	Li Qiumei (CHN)	61.66	Li Yanfeng (CHN)	60.50	Mélina Robert-Michon (FRA)	58.04
Hammer throw	Manuela Montebrun (FRA)	69.78	Yipsi Moreno (CUB)	68.39	Lyudmila Gubkina (BLR)	67.97
Javelin throw	Osleidys Menéndez (CUB)	69.82 UR	Nikola Tomecková (CZE)	62.20	Wei Jianhua (CHN)	57.84
Heptathlon	Jane Jamieson (AUS)	6041	Svetlana Sokolova (RUS)	5985	Sonja Kesselschläger (GER)	5973

== Medal table ==
* Host nation (China)

Rank	Nation	Gold	Silver	Bronze	Total
1	China*	9	3	4	16
2	United States	8	2	2	12
3	Cuba	3	2	0	5
4	Ukraine	2	4	1	7
5	Russia	2	3	2	7
6	Japan	2	2	6	10
7	Spain	2	2	0	4
8	Great Britain	2	1	1	4
9	Italy	2	0	1	3
10	Brazil	1	2	1	4
10	Poland	1	2	1	4
12	Australia	1	1	2	4
13	Israel	1	1	0	2
14	France	1	0	3	4
15	North Korea	1	0	1	2
15	South Africa	1	0	1	2
17	Estonia	1	0	0	1
17	Kenya	1	0	0	1
17	Latvia	1	0	0	1
17	Morocco	1	0	0	1
17	Slovenia	1	0	0	1
17	Turkey	1	0	0	1
23	Belarus	0	3	4	7
24	Kazakhstan	0	3	0	3
24	Romania	0	3	0	3
26	Czech Republic	0	2	1	3
27	Portugal	0	2	0	2
28	Germany	0	1	1	2
29	Austria	0	1	0	1
29	Belgium	0	1	0	1
29	Canada	0	1	0	1
29	Ireland	0	1	0	1
29	Namibia	0	1	0	1
29	South Korea	0	1	0	1
35	Switzerland	0	0	4	4
36	Botswana	0	0	2	2
36	Hungary	0	0	2	2
38	Chinese Taipei	0	0	1	1
38	Croatia	0	0	1	1
38	Netherlands	0	0	1	1
38	Slovakia	0	0	1	1
38	Sweden	0	0	1	1
Totals (42 entries)		45	45	45	135

== See also ==
- 2001 in the sport of athletics
- FISU World University Games
- University and college sport
