= Ken Yoshizawa =

Japanese hurdler (born 1978)

Personal information
- Nationality: Japan
- Born: 24 September 1974 (age 52)
- Education: Juntendo University
- Height: 1.80 m (5 ft 11 in)
- Weight: 71 kg (157 lb)

Sport
- Sport: Track and field
- Event: 400 metres hurdles

Achievements and titles
- Personal bests: 400 m: 47.09 (1999); 400 m hurdles: 48.98 (2002)
Medal record
Men's athletics
Representing Japan
Universiade
| Bronze medal – third place | 2001 Beijing | 4×400 m relay |

Ken Yoshizawa (吉澤 賢, Yoshizawa Ken; born July 7, 1978 in Shisui, Chiba) is a Japanese former hurdler and currently a professional keirin cyclist. He represented Japan at the 2004 Olympics in the 400 metres hurdles. He also ran in the 2001 and 2003 IAAF World Championships in Athletics.

By virtue of his competing in a rare 300 metres hurdles race in Sheffield in 2002, he is ranked in the all-time top 25 of the event.

== International competition ==
| Year | Competition | Venue | Position | Event | Time |
Representing Japan
| 1996 | World Junior Championships | Sydney, Australia | 28th (h) | 400 m hurdles | 53.10 |
| 1998 | Asian Championships | Fukuoka, Japan | 7th | 400 m hurdles | |
| 1999 | Universiade | Palma de Mallorca, Spain | 14th (sf) | 400 m hurdles | 50.17 |
| 2001 | World Championships | Edmonton, Canada | 27th (h) | 400 m hurdles | 50.32 |
| 2001 | Universiade | Beijing, China | 7th | 400 m hurdles | 49.60 |
| 2001 | Universiade | Beijing, China | 3rd | 4×400 m relay | 3:03.63 (relay leg: 2nd) |
| 2002 | Asian Games | Busan, South Korea | 6th | 400 m hurdles | 50.88 |
| 2002 | Asian Games | Busan, South Korea | 4th | 4×400 m relay | 3:05.85 (relay leg: 3rd) |
| 2003 | World Championships | Paris, France | 29th (h) | 400 m hurdles | 50.34 |
| 2004 | Olympic Games | Athens, Greece | 30th (h) | 400 m hurdles | 50.95 |
| 2005 | Asian Championships | Incheon, South Korea | 5th | 400 m hurdles | 50.73 |
