= Ryuji Muraki =

Japanese sprinter

Personal information
- Nationality: Japanese
- Born: 29 December 1979 (age 46) Osaka Prefecture, Japan
- Education: Hosei University
- Height: 1.78 m (5 ft 10 in)
- Weight: 70 kg (150 lb)

Sport
- Country: Japan
- Sport: Track and field
- Event: 400 metres

Achievements and titles
- Personal best: 400 m: 45.88 (2001)
Medal record
Men's athletics
Representing Japan
East Asian Games
| Gold medal – first place | 2001 Osaka | 4×400 m relay |
| Bronze medal – third place | 2001 Osaka | 400 m |
Universiade
| Bronze medal – third place | 2001 Beijing | 4×400 m relay |

Ryuji Muraki (邑木 隆二, Muraki Ryūji; born 29 December 1979 in Osaka Prefecture) is a Japanese retired sprinter who specialized in the 400 metres. He competed in the 4 × 400 metres relay at the 2001 World Championships. He is currently the director of track and field club at Surugadai University.

== Personal best ==
| Event | Time (s) | Competition | Venue | Date |
|---|---|---|---|---|
| 400 m | 45.88 | Kanto University Championships | Yokohama, Japan | 13 May 2001 |

== International competition ==
| Year | Competition | Venue | Position | Event | Time | Notes |
Representing Japan
| 2000 | Asian Championships | Jakarta, Indonesia | 12th (sf) | 400 m | 47.79 | |
| 2001 | East Asian Games | Osaka, Japan | 3rd | 400 m | 46.17 | |
| 2001 | East Asian Games | Osaka, Japan | 1st | 4×400 m relay | 3:03.74 (relay leg: 4th) | GR |
| 2001 | World Championships | Edmonton, Canada | 12th (h) | 4×400 m relay | 3:02.75 (relay leg: 3rd) | SB |
| 2001 | Universiade | Beijing, China | 6th | 400 m | 46.60 | |
| 2001 | Universiade | Beijing, China | 3rd | 4×400 m relay | 3:03.63 (relay leg: 3rd) | |
