= Geno White =

American sprinter

Personal information
- Born: March 10, 1978 (age 48) Jacksonville, Florida, United States

Sport
- Sport: Track and field
- Club: Florida Gators
Medal record
Representing United States
Summer Universiade
Gold medal – first place	2001 Beijing	4x400m relay

Geno White (born March 10, 1978) is an American former sprinter. As a high school student he won the 200 m at the 1997 Pan American Junior Athletics Championships. He was part of the 4 × 400 m relay team which took gold in the 2001 Summer Universiade. He attended the University of Florida. At the Division I Outdoor Championships he, Daymon Carroll, Bernard Williams, and Aaron Armstrong set the school record for the 4 × 100 m relay.
