= Clinton Hill (athlete) =

Australian sprinter (born 1980)

Personal information
- Born: 19 April 1980 (age 46) Johannesburg, South Africa
Medal record
Men's athletics
Representing Australia
Olympic Games
Silver medal – second place	2004 Athens	4 × 400 m relay
Commonwealth Games
Gold medal – first place	2006 Melbourne	4 × 400 m relay
Summer Universiade
Silver medal – second place	2001 Beijing	400 m

Clinton Hill (born 19 April 1980) is an Australian athlete. Born in Johannesburg, South Africa, his family moved to Australia in 1997. He became an Australian citizen in June 2000 and was selected for the national 400 metres team.

He competed in the 400 Metres at the 2004 Olympics, but was knocked out in the heats. However, Hill anchored the Australian team that won the silver medal in the 4 × 400 metres relay.

In 2006 the Australian relay team won the gold medal at the Commonwealth Games.

== Competition record ==
Year	Competition	Venue	Position	Event	Notes
Representing Australia
2001	Universiade	Beijing, China	2nd	400 m	45.63
2001	Universiade	Beijing, China	4th	4 × 400 m relay	3:04.51
2001	Goodwill Games	Brisbane, Australia	7th	400 m	46.65
2001	Goodwill Games	Brisbane, Australia	4th	4 × 400 m relay	3:05.20
2002	Commonwealth Games	Manchester, United Kingdom	8th	400 m	46.00
2002	Commonwealth Games	Manchester, United Kingdom	5th	4 × 400 m relay	3:02.22
2003	World Championships	Paris, France	14th (sf)	400 m	45.35
2003	World Championships	Paris, France	8th (h)	4 × 400 m relay	3:02.89
2004	Olympic Games	Athens, Greece	26th (h)	400 m	45.89
2004	Olympic Games	Athens, Greece	2nd	4 × 400 m relay	3:00.60
2006	Commonwealth Games	Melbourne, Australia	14th (sf)	400 m	45.86
2006	Commonwealth Games	Melbourne, Australia	1st	4 × 400 m relay	3:00.93
2008	Olympic Games	Beijing, China	6th	4 × 400 m relay	3:00.02
