= Mitsuhiro Sato =

Japanese sprinter (born 1980)

Personal information
- Nationality: Japan
- Born: 8 January 1980 (age 46) Aizuwakamatsu, Fukushima, Japan
- Education: Sendai University
- Height: 1.75 m (5 ft 9 in)
- Weight: 62 kg (137 lb)

Sport
- Sport: Track and field
- Event: 400 m
- Retired: 2009
- Personal best: 400 m: 45.50 (Yokohama 2003)
Medal record
Men's athletics
Representing Japan
Asian Championships
Gold medal – first place	2005 Incheon	4×400 m relay
Silver medal – second place	2003 Manila	4×400 m relay
East Asian Games
Gold medal – first place	2001 Osaka	4×400 m relay
Summer Universiade
Bronze medal – third place	2001 Beijing	4×400 m relay
Asian Junior Championships
Gold medal – first place	1999 Singapore	4×400 m relay
Bronze medal – third place	1999 Singapore	400 m

Mitsuhiro Sato (佐藤 光浩, Satō Mitsuhiro; born 8 January 1980 in Aizuwakamatsu, Fukushima) is a retired Japanese sprinter who specializes in the 400 metres.

He finished fourth in 4 × 400 m relay at the 2004 Olympic Games, together with teammates Yuki Yamaguchi, Jun Osakada and Tomohiro Ito. Sato also competed at the World Championships in 2003, 2005 and 2007.

His personal best time is 45.50 seconds, achieved in June 2003 in Yokohama.

== International competition ==
Year	Competition	Venue	Position	Event	Time	Notes
Representing Japan
1999	Asian Junior Championships	Singapore	3rd	400 m	46.75	
1999	Asian Junior Championships	Singapore	1st	4×400 m relay	3:07.38 (relay leg: 1st)	GR
2001	East Asian Games	Osaka, Japan	1st	4×400 m relay	3:03.74 (relay leg: 1st)	GR
2001	Summer Universiade	Beijing, China	7th	400 m	46.99	
2001	Summer Universiade	Beijing, China	3rd	4×400 m relay	3:03.63 (relay leg: 1st)	
2003	World Championships	Paris, France	40th (h)	400 m	46.53	
2003	World Championships	Paris, France	7th	4×400 m relay	3:03.15 (relay leg: 4th)	
2003	Asian Championships	Manila, Philippines	8th	400 m	47.40	
2003	Asian Championships	Manila, Philippines	2nd	4×400 m relay	3:03.59	
2004	Summer Olympics	Athens, Greece	44th (h)	400 m	46.70	
2004	Summer Olympics	Athens, Greece	4th	4×400 m relay	3:00.99 (relay leg: 4th)	SB
2005	World Championships	Helsinki, Finland	23rd (sf)	400 m	48.55	
2005	World Championships	Helsinki, Finland	— (h)	4×400 m relay	DQ (relay leg: 4th)	
2005	Asian Championships	Incheon, South Korea	1st	4×400 m relay	3:03.51 (relay leg: 4th)	
2007	World Championships	Osaka, Japan	10th (h)	4×400 m relay	3:02.76 (relay leg: 4th)	

== National titles ==
- Japanese Championships
  - 400 m: 2003, 2004
