= Yevhen Zyukov =

Ukrainian sprinter

Personal information
- Born: 31 May 1978 (age 48) Kharkiv, Soviet Union

Sport
- Sport: Track and field
Medal record
Representing Ukraine
Summer Universiade
Gold medal – first place	2003 Daegu	4x400m relay
Silver medal – second place	2001 Beijing	4x400m relay

Yevhen Zyukov (born 31 May 1978) is a Ukrainian sprinter who competed in the 2000 Summer Olympics and in the 2004 Summer Olympics.
