= Andrew Pierce (sprinter) =

American sprinter

Personal information
- Born: June 8, 1979 (age 47) Xenia, Ohio, United States

Sport
- Sport: Track and field
Medal record
Representing United States
Summer Universiade
Gold medal – first place	2001 Beijing	400m
Gold medal – first place	2001 Beijing	4x400m relay

Andrew Pierce (born June 8, 1979) is an American former sprinter. He ran for Ohio State University.

Pierce was twice a runner-up in the 400 meters at the NCAA Division I Indoor Track and Field Championships. He finished second to Brandon Couts at the 2000 edition and to Rickey Harris at the 2001 edition.
