= Manfred Pflugbeil =

German decathlete

Personal information
- Born: 15 February 1942 (age 84)
Medal record
Men's athletics
Representing West Germany
Universiade
Gold medal – first place	1963 Porto Alegre	Decathlon
Bronze medal – third place	1965 Budapest	Decathlon

Manfred Pflugbeil (born 15 February 1942) is a retired decathlete who competed for the West Germany during his career. He set his personal best in the event (7413 points) on 27 August 1965 at a meet in Budapest.
