= Brandon Couts =

American sprinter

Personal information
- Born: February 17, 1979 (age 47) Dallas, Texas, United States

Sport
- Sport: Track and field
Medal record
Representing United States
Summer Universiade
Gold medal – first place	1999 Palma de Mallorca	4x400m relay
Gold medal – first place	2001 Beijing	4x400m relay

Brandon Couts (born February 17, 1979) is an American former sprinter. He was the 2002 National Indoor Champion in the 400 meters. Couts coached sprints and hurdlers at the University of Colorado.

Competing for the Baylor Bears track and field team, Couts won both the 2000 and 2001 NCAA Division I Outdoor Track and Field Championships in the 4 × 400 m relay, anchoring both teams.
