= Thomas Gerding =

American sprinter (born 1978)

Personal information
- Born: December 17, 1978 (age 47) Waconia, Minnesota, United States

Sport
- Sport: Track and field
- Club: Minnesota Golden Gophers
Medal record
Representing United States
Summer Universiade
Gold medal – first place	2001 Beijing	4x400m relay

Thomas "Tom" Gerding (born December 17, 1978) is an American former sprinter.
