= Oleksandr Kaydash =

Ukrainian sprinter

Personal information
- Born: 30 May 1976 (age 50) Rubizhne, Soviet Union

Sport
- Sport: Track and field
Medal record
Representing Ukraine
European Championships
Gold medal – first place	2002 Munich	4×100 m relay
Summer Universiade
Silver medal – second place	2001 Beijing	4x400 m relay

Oleksandr Kaydash (born 30 May 1976) is a Ukrainian former athlete who competed in the 2000 Summer Olympics.
