= Thailand women's national volleyball team competition history =

== Olympics ==
=== Results ===
(United States) 2028 Los Angeles

Preliminary round				Final Rank
Pool B (Los Angeles)				Final Rank
USA	CAN	ITA	Rank	Final Rank
W 3–0	W 3–0	W 3–0		

== World Championship ==
=== Results ===
Japan 1998

Preliminary round				Final Rank
Pool D (Kagoshima)				Final Rank
CHN	KOR	CRO	Rank	Final Rank
L 0–3	L 0–3	L 0–3	4	13

Germany 2002

Preliminary round						Final Rank
Pool D (Leipzig)						Final Rank
GRE	POL	CHN	AUS	BRA	Rank	Final Rank
L 0–3	L 0–3	L 1–3	W 3–1	L 0–3	5	17

Japan 2010

Preliminary round						Second round					Final Rank
Pool C (Matsumoto)						Pool F (Nagoya)					Final Rank
USA	KAZ	CRO	CUB	GER	Rank	BRA	NED	ITA	CZE	Rank	Final Rank
L 1–3	W 3–1	W 3–0	L 0–3	L 0–3	4 Q	L 0–3	W 3–1	L 0–3	W 3–1	7	13

Italy 2014

Preliminary round						Final Rank
Pool C (Verona)						Final Rank
RUS	NED	MEX	USA	KAZ	Rank	Final Rank
L 0–3	L 0–3	W 3–0	L 0–3	L 0–3	5	17

Japan 2018

Preliminary round						Second round					Final Rank
Pool C (Kobe)						Pool F (Osaka)					Final Rank
KOR	RUS	TTO	USA	AZE	Rank	CHN	ITA	BUL	TUR	Rank	Final Rank
W 3–2	L 2–3	W 3–1	L 2–3	W 3–1	3 Q	L 0–3	L 0–3	L 2–3	L 1–3	7	13

Netherlands-Poland 2022

Preliminary round						Second round					Final Rank
Pool B (Arnhem/Gdańsk)						Pool F (Lodz)					Final Rank
TUR	POL	CRO	KOR	DOM	Rank	CAN	GER	SRB	USA	Rank	Final Rank
W 3–2	L 0–3	W 3–0	W 3–0	W 3–2	2 Q	L 1–3	L 1–3	L 0–3	L 2–3	7	13

Thailand 2025

Preliminary round				Final round	Final Rank
Pool A (Bangkok)				Round of 16 (Bangkok)	Final Rank
EGY	SWE	NED	Rank	JPN	Final Rank
W 3–1	W 3–0	L 2–3	2 Q	L 0–3	13

== World Cup ==
=== Results ===
Japan 2007

Tokyo			Osaka		Kumamoto			Komaki			Final Rank
ITA	SRB	DOM	JPN	KOR	BRA	USA	CUB	KEN	PER	POL	Final Rank
L 0–3	L 1–3	L 2–3	L 0–3	L 0–3	L 0–3	L 1–3	L 1–3	W 3–2	W 3–0	L 0–3	10

== World Grand Champions Cup ==
=== Results ===
Japan 2009

Tokyo			Fukuoka		Rank
ITA	DOM	JPN	KOR	BRA	Rank
L 0–3	L 1–3	L 0–3	L 2–3	L 0–3	6

Japan 2013

Nagoya		Tokyo			Rank
DOM	BRA	JPN	USA	RUS	Rank
L 0–3	L 1–3	L 0–3	L 2–3	W 3–1	5

== World Grand Prix ==
=== Results ===
Hong Kong 2002

Preliminary round												Rank
Pool A (Tokyo)				Pool D (Nakhon Ratchasima)				Pool E (Macau)				Rank
JPN	BRA	GER	Rank	CUB	USA	CHN	Rank	BRA	CHN	GER	Rank	Rank
L 0–3	L 1–3	L 0–3	4	L 2–3	L 1–3	L 0–3	4	L 0–3	L 0–3	L 0–3	4	8

Italy 2003

Preliminary round						Rank
Pool B (Matera)						Rank
BRA	RUS	CHN	KOR	CAN	Rank	Rank
L 0–3	L 0–3	L 0–3	L 0–3	W 3–1	5	10

Italy 2004

Preliminary round												Rank
Pool A (Bangkok)				Pool E (Hong Kong)				Pool G (Rostock)				Rank
CUB	KOR	USA	Rank	CHN	ITA	USA	Rank	GER	USA	RUS	Rank	Rank
L 0–3	W 3–2	L 0–3	3	L 0–3	L 1–3	L 0–3	4	L 1–3	L 2–3	L 1–3	4	10

Japan 2005

Preliminary round												Rank
Pool C (Ningbo)				Pool F (Manila)				Pool I (Bangkok)				Rank
CHN	USA	NED	Rank	CUB	ITA	NED	Rank	USA	POL	JPN	Rank	Rank
L 0–3	L 0–3	L 0–3	4	L 0–3	L 0–3	L 0–3	4	L 1–3	L 0–3	L 1–3	4	12

Italy 2006

Preliminary round												Rank
Pool B (Hong Kong)				Pool F (Taipei)				Pool H (Bangkok)				Rank
CHN	RUS	AZE	Rank	CUB	ITA	AZE	Rank	USA	RUS	KOR	Rank	Rank
L 0–3	L 1–3	L 2–3	4	L 0–3	L 1–3	W 3–2	3	L 0–3	L 0–3	L 0–3	4	11

Japan 2008

Preliminary round												Rank
Pool B (Ningbo)				Pool E (Wrocław)				Pool G (Bangkok)				Rank
BRA	CHN	GER	Rank	USA	POL	DOM	Rank	KAZ	GER	CUB	Rank	Rank
L 0–3	L 0–3	L 1–3	4	L 1–3	W 3–2	L 1–3	3	L 2–3	L 0–3	L 2–3	4	11

Japan 2009

Preliminary round												Rank
Pool B (Kielce)				Pool E (Macau)				Pool I (Bangkok)				Rank
POL	JPN	NED	Rank	BRA	CHN	POL	Rank	PUR	RUS	USA	Rank	Rank
W 3–2	W 3–2	L 1–3	3	L 0–3	L 1–3	L 0–3	4	W 3–0	L 1–3	W 3–2	2	8

China 2010

Preliminary round												Rank
Pool C (Chengdu)				Pool D (Bangkok)				Pool G (Hong Kong)				Rank
NED	CHN	PUR	Rank	PUR	USA	ITA	Rank	CHN	USA	GER	Rank	Rank
L 0–3	L 0–3	L 0–3	4	W 3–1	L 0–3	L 1–3	3	L 1–3	L 0–3	W 3–1	4	10

Macau 2011

Preliminary round													Final round (Macau)					Rank
Pool B (Nakhon Pathom)				Pool F (Almaty)				Pool K (Bangkok)				Rank	Pool A				5th place	Rank
PER	CUB	RUS	Rank	BRA	ITA	KAZ	Rank	ARG	CUB	BRA	Rank	Rank	RUS	CHN	SRB	Rank	JPN	Rank
W 3–0	W 3–2	L 0–3	2	L 0–3	L 2–3	W 3–0	3	W 3–0	W 3–1	L 0–3	2	8 Q	L 1–3	W 3–1	L 0–3	3	L 0–3	6

China 2012

Preliminary round													Final round (Ningbo)					Rank
Pool A (Macau)				Pool F (Komaki)				Pool J (Bangkok)				Rank	Final round (Ningbo)					Rank
ARG	PUR	CHN	Rank	PUR	DOM	JPN	Rank	ARG	SRB	USA	Rank	Rank	TUR	USA	CHN	BRA	CUB	Rank
W 3–0	W 3–0	L 1–3	2	W 3–1	W 3–0	W 3–2	1	W 3–0	W 3–1	L 0–3	2	4 Q	L 1–3	L 1–3	W 3–2	L 0–3	W 3–0	4

Japan 2013

Preliminary round												Rank
Pool C (Ankara)				Pool J (Yekaterinburg)				Pool L (Bangkok)				Rank
JPN	TUR	ALG	Rank	CUB	RUS	ITA	Rank	PUR	GER	RUS	Rank	Rank
L 0–3	L 0–3	W 3–0	3	W 3–1	L 0–3	L 1–3	3	W 3–1	L 0–3	L 2–3	3	13

Japan 2014

Preliminary round												Rank
Pool B (Hwaseong)				Pool F (Hong Kong)				Pool G (Bangkok)				Rank
KOR	SRB	GER	Rank	CHN	ITA	JPN	Rank	DOM	USA	BRA	Rank	Rank
L 1–3	W 3–2	L 0–3	3	L 1–3	L 0–3	L 1–3	4	W 3–1	L 2–3	L 0–3	3	11

United States 2015

Preliminary round												Rank
Pool A (Bangkok)				Pool D (São Paulo)				Pool H (Hong Kong)				Rank
SRB	JPN	BRA	Rank	GER	BRA	BEL	Rank	CHN	USA	JPN	Rank	Rank
W 3–2	L 0–3	L 0–3	3	W 3–0	L 1–3	W 3–1	2	L 0–3	L 1–3	L 0–3	4	9

Thailand 2016

Preliminary round													Final round (Bangkok)				Rank
Pool A (Ningbo)				Pool F (Bari)				Pool I (Kyoto)				Rank	Pool K			5th place	Rank
CHN	USA	GER	Rank	RUS	NED	ITA	Rank	JPN	RUS	SRB	Rank	Rank	BRA	RUS	Rank	CHN	Rank
L 0–3	L 0–3	W 3–1	3	L 0–3	L 0–3	W 3–2	3	L 0–3	L 1–3	L 0–3	4	10 Q	L 0–3	L 0–3	3	L 0–3	6

China 2017

Preliminary round												Rank
Pool C (Apeldoorn)				Pool D (Sendai)				Pool H (Bangkok)				Rank
JPN	NED	DOM	Rank	JPN	BRA	SRB	Rank	DOM	TUR	ITA	Rank	Rank
L 2–3	L 0–3	L 1–3	4	L 1–3	W 3–0	L 1–3	4	L 2–3	W 3–0	W 3–0	1	10

== Nations League ==
=== Results ===
China 2018

Preliminary round															Rank
Pool 1 (Yekaterinburg)			Pool 7 (Macau)			Pool 11 (Bangkok)			Pool 15 (Nakhon Ratchasima)			Pool 19 (Eboli)			Rank
NED	RUS	ARG	SRB	CHN	POL	DOM	GER	USA	KOR	TUR	JPN	ITA	BRA	BEL	Rank
L 0–3	L 1–3	W 3–0	L 1–3	L 1–3	W 3–2	L 0–3	L 2–3	L 0–3	L 1–3	L 1–3	L 2–3	L 0–3	L 1–3	L 1–3	15

China 2019

Preliminary round															Rank
Pool 1 (Opole)			Pool 7 (Macau)			Pool 11 (Bangkok)			Pool 15 (Tokyo)			Pool 19 (Yekaterinburg)			Rank
GER	ITA	POL	CHN	KOR	BEL	BUL	DOM	TUR	SRB	BRA	JPN	NED	RUS	USA	Rank
W 3–0	L 0–3	L 0–3	L 0–3	W 3–1	L 0–3	W 3–1	L 2–3	L 0–3	W 3–0	L 0–3	L 0–3	L 0–3	W 3–1	L 0–3	12

Italy 2021

Preliminary round															Rank
Rimini															Rank
JPN	KOR	CHN	NED	SRB	USA	TUR	RUS	DOM	GER	POL	BRA	BEL	CAN	ITA	Rank
L 0–3	L 1–3	L 0–3	L 0–3	L 0–3	L 0–3	L 1–3	L 1–3	L 0–3	W 3–1	L 0–3	L 0–3	L 1–3	W 3–0	L 1–3	16

Turkey 2022

Preliminary round													Final round	Rank
Week 1 (Ankara)				Week 2 (Quezon City)				Week 3 (Sofia)				Rank	Week 4 (Ankara)	Rank
BUL	SRB	BEL	CHN	CAN	POL	JPN	USA	KOR	DOM	BRA	ITA	Rank	TUR	Rank
W3–0	W3–2	L2–3	W3–2	W3–0	L2–3	L0–3	L1–3	W3–0	L1–3	L1–3	L0–3	8 Q	L0–3	8

== Olympic Qualification Tournament ==
=== Results ===
• Intercontinental Tournament

(Japan) Tokyo 2004

Round robin
KOR	JPN	TPE	NGR	RUS	PUR	ITA	Rank
L 1–3	L 0–3	W 3–0	W 3–0	L 0–3	W 3–0	L 0–3	5

(Japan) Tokyo 2008

Round robin
DOM	KOR	PUR	SRB	POL	JPN	KAZ	Rank
L 0–3	L 2–3	W 3–0	L 0–3	L 1–3	L 2–3	L 1–3	7

(Japan) Tokyo 2012

Round robin
RUS	SRB	JPN	TPE	PER	KOR	CUB	Rank
L 0–3	W 3–0	L 0–3	W 3–0	W 3–0	L 0–3	W 3–1	5

(Japan) Tokyo 2016

Round robin
DOM	ITA	NED	JPN	KAZ	KOR	PER	Rank
W 3–1	L 1–3	L 0–3	L 2–3	W 3–0	W 3–2	W 3–0	5

(Poland) Wrocław 2019

Round robin
SRB	POL	PUR	Rank
L 0–3	L 2–3	W 3–1	3

(Poland) Łódź 2023

Round robin
GER	USA	ITA	POL	SLO	KOR	COL	Rank
L 0–3	L 0–3	L 1–3	W 3–2	W 3–0	W 3–0	W 3–1	4

• Asian Tournament

(Thailand) Nakhon Ratchasima 2020

Preliminary round			Final round		Final Rank
Pool A			Semifinal	Final	Final Rank
TPE	AUS	Rank	KAZ	KOR	Final Rank
W 3–0	W 3–0	1	W 3–1	L 0–3	2

== World Championship Qualification Tournament ==
=== Results ===
China 1997

Final round				Play-off		
Pool B (Chengdu)				Away	Home	Rank
AUS	CHN	INA	Rank	TPE	TPE	Rank
W 3–0	L 0–3	W 3–0	2 q	W 3–0	W 3–0	1 Q

Thailand 2001

Final round
Pool C (Bangkok)
UZB	TPE	JPN	Rank
W 3–0	W 3–0	L 0–3	2 Q

Thailand 2005

Final round
Pool B (Ratchaburi)
KAZ	KOR	PHI	TGA	Rank
L 1–3	L 1–3	W 3–0	W 3–0	3

China 2009

Second round				Final round			
Pool C (Nakhon Pathom)				Pool D (Chengdu)			
FJI	BAN	TPE	Rank	UZB	FJI	CHN	Rank
W 3–0	W 3–0	W 3–2	1 Q	W 3–0	W 3–0	L 0–3	2 Q

Japan 2013

Final round
Pool A (Komaki)
AUS	TPE	VIE	JPN	Rank
W 3–0	W 3–0	W 3–0	L 0–3	2 Q

Thailand 2017

Final round
Pool B (Nakhon Pathom)
IRN	VIE	PRK	KOR	Rank
W 3–0	W 3–0	W 3–0	L 0–3	2 Q

== Summer Universiade ==
=== Results ===
Serbia 2009

Preliminary round (Belgrade)				Classification round (Belgrade)			
Pool D				9–16th	9–12th	11–12th	Rank
RUS	SWE	JPN	Rank	MGL	BRA	GBR	Rank
L 0–3	W 3–2	L 0–3	3 q	W 3–1	L 0–3	W 3–0	11

China 2011

Preliminary round (Shenzhen)				Final/Classification round (Shenzhen)			
Pool D				QF	5–8th	5–6th	Rank
BRA	NOR	HKG	Rank	RUS	POL	TPE	Rank
L 0–3	W 3–0	W 3–0	2 Q	L 1–3	W 3–1	W 3–2	5

Russia 2013

Preliminary round (Kazan)				Final round (Kazan)			
Pool D				QF	5–8th	5–6th	Rank
HKG	CHI	JPN	Rank	CAN	RUS	POL	Rank
W 3–0	W 3–0	W 3–0	1 Q	W 3–0	L 0–3	W 3–1	3rd place, bronze medalist(s)

South Korea 2015

Preliminary round (Gwangju)				Final/Classification round (Gwangju)			
Pool D				QF	5–8th	5–6th	Rank
ZIM	TUR	CAN	Rank	UKR	CHN	COL	Rank
W 3–0	W 3–1	L 2–3	1 Q	L 1–3	L 1–3	W 3–0	7

Chinese Taipei 2017

Preliminary round (Taipei)				Final/Classification round (Taipei)			
Pool C				QF	5–8th	5–6th	Rank
LAT	JPN	USA	Rank	RUS	FRA	FIN	Rank
W 3–0	L 0–3	W 3–2	2 Q	L 0–3	W 3–0	L 1–3	6
