= Gymnastics at the 2015 Summer Universiade – Men's artistic individual all-around =

Men's artistic individual all-around at the 2015 Summer Universiade
- Venue: Gwangju Women's University Universiade Gymnasium
- Date: July 6, 2015
- Competitors: 28 from 36 nations

Medalists
gold medal	Oleg Verniaiev	Ukraine
silver medal	Shogo Nonomura	Japan
bronze medal	Akash Modi	United States

The Men's artistic individual all-around competition Gymnastics at the 2015 Summer Universiade in Gwangju was held on 6 July at the Gwangju Women's University Universiade Gymnasium.

== Schedule ==
All times are Korea Standard Time (UTC+09:00)

Date	Time	Event
Tuesday, 6 July 2015	14:30	Final

== Results ==
Rank	Team	Floor (gymnastics)	Pommel horse	Rings (gymnastics)	Vault (gymnastics)	Parallel bars	Horizontal bar	Total
1st place, gold medalist(s)	Oleg Verniaiev (UKR)	15.525	15.400	15.250	14.850	15.900	15.150	92.075
2nd place, silver medalist(s)	Shogo Nonomura (JPN)	15.150	14.450	15.025	14.750	14.900	15.000	89.275
3rd place, bronze medalist(s)	Akash Modi (USA)	15.000	14.650	14.250	14.850	14.800	14.750	88.300
4	Naoto Hayasaka (JPN)	15.775	12.900	14.325	14.725	15.200	15.100	88.025
5	Donothan Bailey (USA)	14.300	15.000	14.300	14.750	13.950	14.550	86.850
6	Cen Yu (CHN)	15.125	13.200	14.500	15.550	14.450	13.750	86.575
7	Park Min-soo (KOR)	14.300	13.050	14.700	14.525	15.050	14.900	86.525
8	Ferhat Arıcan (TUR)	14.500	14.250	13.750	14.350	15.575	14.000	86.425
9	Daniil Kazachkov (RUS)	14.900	13.650	15.100	14.000	14.175	14.300	86.125
10	Wang Peng (CHN)	14.550	13.900	14.100	15.000	14.350	13.850	85.750
11	Mikhail Kudashov (RUS)	14.450	13.700	14.550	14.850	13.400	13.450	84.400
12	Mathias Philippe (FRA)	14.800	11.850	14.300	14.250	13.950	13.850	83.000
13	Gustavo Simoes (POR)	14.200	13.800	14.500	14.200	12.450	13.600	82.750
14	Kevin Rossi (SUI)	14.700	14.000	13.700	14.075	13.750	12.250	82.475
15	Nikolay Nam (KAZ)	14.175	13.500	14.050	14.325	13.050	13.050	82.150
16	Simon Nützi (SUI)	13.400	12.500	14.100	13.150	14.150	14.050	81.350
17	Ibrahim Çolak (TUR)	13.300	12.050	15.200	12.750	14.425	12.650	80.375
18	Maxime Gentges (BEL)	13.750	13.850	13.750	13.200	12.925	10.800	78.275
