= Ukraine at the 2015 Summer Universiade =

- IOC code: UKR
- NOC: National Olympic Committee of Ukraine
- Website: http://www.noc-ukr.org

in Gwangju, South Korea 3 – 14 July 2015
- Competitors: 138 in 13 sports
- Medals Ranked 8th: Gold 8 Silver 17 Bronze 6 Total 31

Summer Universiade appearances (overview)
- 1993; 1995; 1997; 1999; 2001; 2003; 2005; 2007; 2009; 2011; 2013; 2015; 2017; 2019; 2021; 2025; 2027

Ukraine participated at the 2015 Summer Universiade in Gwangju, South Korea. The team won 31 medals and ranked 8th.

== Competitors ==
Ukraine was represented by 138 athletes in 13 sports. Ukraine was not represented in badminton, baseball, basketball, diving, shooting, table tennis, and water polo.

Sport	Men	Women	Total
Archery	1	—	1
Athletics	4	4	8
Fencing	8	8	16
Football	20	—	20
Golf	1	—	1
Gymnastics	5	7	12
Handball	—	15	15
Judo	8	6	14
Rowing	10	4	14
Swimming	4	3	7
Taekwondo	3	1	4
Tennis	2	—	2
Volleyball	12	12	24
Total	78	60	138

== Medal summary ==
=== Medal by sports ===
Medals by sport
Sport	1st place, gold medalist(s)	2nd place, silver medalist(s)	3rd place, bronze medalist(s)	Total
Rhythmic gymnastics	2	4	1	7
Artistic gymnastics	2	3	3	8
Swimming	2	1	0	3
Rowing	1	4	0	5
Athletics	1	0	0	1
Fencing	0	2	0	2
Volleyball	0	2	0	2
Judo	0	1	2	3
Total	8	17	6	31

=== Medalists ===
The medalists were presented awards by the Ministry of Education and Science of Ukraine for their achievements at the Games.

Medal	Name	Sport	Event	Date
Gold	Serhiy Frolov	Swimming	Men's 800m Freestyle	5 July
Gold	Oleh Vernyayev	Gymnastics	Men's Individual All-Around	6 July
Gold	Daryna Verkhohliad; Ievgeniia Nimchenko; Nataliia Kovalova; Nataliya Dovhodko	Rowing	Women's Coxless Four	6 July
Gold	Oleh Vernyayev	Gymnastics	Men's Parallel Bars	7 July
Gold	Igor Glavan; Nazar Kovalenko; Ivan Banzeruk	Athletics	Men's Team 20 km Walk	9 July
Gold	Mariya Liver	Swimming	Women's 50m Breaststroke	10 July
Gold	Ganna Rizatdinova	Gymnastics	Clubs	13 July
Gold	Anastasiia Mulmina; Oleksandra Gridasova; Olena Dmytrash; Valeriia Gudym; Yevgeniya Gomon	Gymnastics	Group – 6 clubs, 2 hoops	13 July
Silver	Dmytro Kanivets	Judo	Men's -73 kg	6 July
Silver	Oleh Vernyayev	Gymnastics	Men's Floor Exercise	7 July
Silver	Ihor Radivilov	Gymnastics	Men's Rings	7 July
Silver	Ihor Radivilov	Gymnastics	Men's Vault	7 July
Silver	Bohdan Platonov; Dmytro Raskosov; Yevhen Statsenko; Yuriy Tsap	Fencing	Men's Sabre Team	7 July
Silver	Ihor Khmara; Andrii Mykhailov; Anton Bondarenko; Yurii Ivanov; Artem Verestiuk; Oleksandr Nadtoka; Dmytro Mikhay; Ivan Dovhodko; Vladyslav Nikulin	Rowing	Men's eight	7 July
Silver	Ihor Khmara; Stanislav Kovalov	Rowing	Men's Lightweight Double Sculls	7 July
Silver	Daryna Verkhogliad; Ievgeniia Nimchenko	Rowing	Women's Double Sculls	7 July
Silver	Nataliya Dovhodko	Rowing	Women's Single Sculls	7 July
Silver	Valeriy Zharskyy; Volodymyr Stankevych; Yan Sych; Yuriy Taranenko	Fencing	Men's Épée Team	8 July
Silver	Serhiy Frolov	Swimming	Men's 1500m Freestyle	9 July
Silver	Ganna Lisieienkova; Anna Stepaniuk; Diana Karpets; Kateryna Kalchenko; Anastasiia Chernukha; Viktoriya Delros; Maryna Degtiarova; Svitlana Dorsman; Angelina Dubianska; Kateryna Dudnyk; Oksana Madzar; Nadiia Kodola	Volleyball	Women's volleyball	11 July
Silver	Ganna Rizatdinova	Gymnastics	Individual All-Around	12 July
Silver	Anastasiia Mulmina; Oleksandra Gridasova; Olena Dmytrash; Valeriia Gudym; Yevgeniya Gomon	Gymnastics	Group All-Around	12 July
Silver	Pylyp Harmash; Yurii Synytsia; Dmytro Bogdan; Oleksiy Klyamar; Mykola Moroz; Maksym Drozd; Dmytro Shorkin; Yuriy Tomyn; Sergiy Tyutlin; Dmytro Teryomenko; Oleg Shevchenko; Oleksandr Dmytriev	Volleyball	Men's volleyball	12 July
Silver	Ganna Rizatdinova	Gymnastics	Ball	13 July
Silver	Anastasiia Mulmina; Oleksandra Gridasova; Olena Dmytrash; Valeriia Gudym; Yevgeniya Gomon	Gymnastics	Group – 5 ribbons	13 July
Bronze	Ihor Radivilov; Mykyta Yermak; Oleh Vernyayev; Vitalii Arseniev; Volodymyr Okachev	Gymnastics	Men's Team	5 July
Bronze	Tetiana Levytska	Judo	Women's -52 kg	6 July
Bronze	Oleh Vernyayev	Gymnastics	Men's Rings	7 July
Bronze	Oleh Vernyayev	Gymnastics	Men's Vault	7 July
Bronze	Bogdan Iadov; Mykhailo Ilytchuk; Dmytro Kanivets; Denys Tolkach; Artem Gulyayev; Dmytro Luchyn; Fedir Panko; Anton Rudnyk	Judo	Men's Team	8 July
Bronze	Ganna Rizatdinova	Gymnastics	Ribbon	13 July

== See also ==
- Ukraine at the 2015 Winter Universiade

== Sources ==
- Country overview: Ukraine on the official website
