= Turkey at the 2005 Summer Universiade =

- IOC code: TUR

in Smirne
- Competitors: 285 in 14 sports
- Medals Ranked 8th: Gold 10 Silver 11 Bronze 6 Total 27

Summer Universiade appearances (overview)
- 1985; 1987; 1989; 1991; 1993; 1995; 1997; 1999; 2001; 2003; 2005; 2007; 2009; 2011; 2013; 2015; 2017; 2019; 2021; 2025; 2027

Turkey competed at the 2005 Summer Universiade in İzmir, Turkey from 11 August to 22 August 2005. A total of 285 athletes were a part of the Turkish team competing in 14 sports branches.

Turkey won 27 medals (8th place), including ten gold, eleven silver and six bronze medals.

== Medal table ==
Sport	Gold	Silver	Bronze	Total
Archery	0	0	1	1
Athletics	1	3	1	5
Sailing	0	1	0	1
Taekwondo	5	2	1	8
Volleyball	1	0	0	1
Water polo	0	0	1	1
Wrestling	3	5	2	10
Total	10	11	6	27

== Archery ==
Men's

Athlete	Event	Round of 16	Quarterfinal	Semifinal	Final	Total	Rank
Mehmet Darılmaz	Individual recurve	164	162	151	DNQ		15th
Uğur Balıkçı	Individual recurve	161	162	DNQ	-	-	18th
Okyay Tunç Küçükkayalar	Individual recurve	161	158	DNQ	-	-	25th
Uğur Balıkçı; Mehmet Darılmaz; Okyay Tunç Küçükkayalar	Teaml Recurve		17	DNQ	-	-	11th
Ayhan Kaya	Individual compound	158	DNQ	-	-	-	18th
Emre özdemir	Individual compound	149	DNQ	-	-	-	26th
Ramazan Açıkgöz	Individual compound	143	DNQ	-	-	-	29th
Ramazan Açıkgöz; Ayhan Kaya; Emre Özdemir	Team compound		17	17	DNQ	-	6th

Women's

Athlete	Event	Round of 16	Quarterfinal	Semifinal	Final	Total	Rank
Damla Günay	Individual recurve	153	159	148	DNQ	-	14th
Gülcan Çakır	Individual recurve	142	147	DNQ	-	-	30th
Burcu Çeviren	Individual recurve	149	145	DNQ	-	-	40th
Gülcan Çakır; B urcu Çeviren; Damla Günay	Team recurve		11	13	DNQ		8th
Gamze Uçar	Individual compound	BYE	163	110	DNQ	-	5th
Neşe Alptekin	Individual compound	157	159	DNQ	-	-	9th
Sevinç Uysal	Individual compound	155	157	DNQ	-	-	11th
Neşe Alptekin; Gamze Uçar; Sevinç Uysal	Team compound		17	13	14	(27)	3rd place, bronze medalist(s)

== Athletics ==
Men's

24 male athletes competed for Turkey.

Athlete	Event	Result	Rank
Selahattin Çobanoğlu	800 metres	1:47.49 SB	2nd place, silver medalist(s)
Fatih Bilgiç	5000 metres	14:26.39	17th
Halil Akkaş	5000 metres		DNS
Sabri Kara	10,000 metres	30:20.18 SB	15th
Mugdat Öztürk	10,000 metres	30:52.78	17th
Halil Akkaş	3000 metres steeplechase	8:30.16	1st place, gold medalist(s)
Abdil Ceylan	Half marathon	1:06:13	13th
Selahattin Selçuk	Half marathon	1:07:13	18th
Bekir Karayel	Half marathon	1:09:22	26th
Recep Çelik	20 km walk		DNF
Ferhat Çiçek	Triple jump		NM
Fatih Yazıcı	Shot put	17.69 m	12th
Eşref Apak	Hammer throw	76.18 m	2nd place, silver medalist(s)

Women's

21 female athletes took part at the Games.

Athlete	Event	Result	Rank
Binnaz Uslu	800 metres	2:01.42	2nd place, silver medalist(s)
Binnaz Uslu	5000 metres		DNF
Türkan Erişmiş	3000 metres steeplechase	9:50.32 NR	3rd place, bronze medalist(s)
Esen Kızıldağ; Birsen Engin; Gülay Kırşan-Kılıç; Burcu Şentürk	4 × 100 metres relay	46.41	6th
Türkan Erişmiş	Half marathon		DNS
Yeliz Ay	20 km walk	1:38:50	7th
Candeğer Oğuz	High jump	1.80 m	10th
Çağdaş Arslan	Triple jump	12.21 m	15th
Filiz Kadoğan	Shot put	16.62 m	6th
Ahu Sulak	Discus throw	50.48 m	12th
Suzan Balkesen	Discus throw	50.29 m	DNQ
Berna Demirci	Javelin throw	50.26 m	13th
Sema Aydemir	Heptathlon	4595	14th
Öznur Gültekin	Heptathlon	2845	DNF

== Basketball ==
Men's tournament
Team

- Arda Vekilğğlu
- Ümit Türkoğlu
- Nedim Yücel
- Adem ören
- Rıfat Muratkaya
- Muratcan Güler
- Hakan Demirel
- Erdem Türetken
- Onur Aydın
- Cihat Şahin
- Mehmet Yağmur
- Oğuz Savaş

Head coach: (Turkey) Haşim Ali Tümdoğan

Preliminary round

Group A

Turkey	124–46	United Arab Emirates

Finland	59–80	Turkey

Turkey	121–76	Brazil

Playoff round

Turkey	89–58	South Korea

Serbia	85–79	Turkey

Russia	83–79	Turkey

Australia	72–82	Turkey

Germany	74–55	Turkey

Final standing

Team	Rank
Turkey	6th

Women's tournament
Team

- Melis Ülker
- Dilek Ünüvar
- Ceyda İşbırakmaz
- Şükran Albayrak
- Nazlı Güler
- Pelin İncel
- Gülçin Cantekin
- Esra Şencebe
- Derta Çam
- Deniz Boz
- Ceyda Kozluca
- İlkay Maşa

Head coach: (Turkey) Muzaffer Kalaycıoğlu

Preliminary round

Group A

Team	Pld	W	L	PF	PA	PD	Pts
Austria	4	4	0	299	230	+69	8
Turkey	4	3	1	243	223	+20	7
Slovenia	4	2	2	280	252	+28	6
Sweden	4	1	3	258	265	−7	5
Thailand	4	0	4	223	333	−110	4

Turkey	72–52	Sweden

Slovenia	45–53	Turkey

Turkey	48–70	Austria

Turkey	70–56	Thailand

Playoff round
Quarterfinals

Russia	82–68	Turkey

Chinese Taipei	73–64	Turkey

7th-8th Place

Turkey	57–78	Poland

Final standing

Team	Rank	W-L Record
Turkey	8th	3-4

== Diving ==
Men's

Sinan Ertekin, Özgür Cengizhan, Öncü Erinç Kuzucu

== Fencing ==
Men's

Can Gülersoy, Mustafa Oğur, Murat narin, Kamil Özdemi, Erdoğan Kızıldağ, Güneş Darıca, Batuhan Sarsılamaz, Erkan Malay, Selçuk Dönerkaya, Gökmert Yapakçı, Hasan İşyar, Adnan Özsanat

Athlete	Event	Rank
Gökmert Yapakçı	Individual Épée	59th

Women's

Mine Ergüz, Özden Aslan, Şenay Güner, Semra Deliormanlı, Emel Işık, Pınar Kalaycı, Naile Sevda Varol, Reha Doğan, Ilgın Güçlüce, Kader Yildiz, Nevin Gürdoğan, Ayşe Bekiroğlu

== Football ==
Men's tournament
Team

- Fatih Egedik
- Taylan Uzunoğlu
- Hasan Kabze
- Ozan Tahtaişleyen
- Kemal Okyay
- Kazım Şeker
- İlker Avcıbey
- Mehmet Al
- Emirhan Özdemir
- Mesut Mogul
- Tuna Kaya
- Tufan Apaydın
- Bora Sevim
- Veysi Öz
- Mehmet Altun
- Can Ulun
- Serkan İşyapan
- Can Arat
- İlker Kıldır

Head coach: (Turkey) Ünal Karaman

Group A

Team	Pld	W	D	L	GF	GA	GD	Pts
Brazil	3	2	0	1	6	4	+2	6
Morocco	3	2	0	1	4	2	+2	6
Turkey	3	2	0	1	6	5	+1	6
South Korea	3	0	0	3	2	7	−5	0

Qualification

16 August 2005
10:00

Turkey	4-2	Great Britain

16 August 2005
18:00

Turkey	4-1	Republic of Ireland

9th - 10th Place

16 August 2005
18:00

Turkey	2-1	Thailand

Final standing

Team	Rank
Turkey	9th

Women's tournament
Team

- Gazel Güven
- Meryem Özyumşak
- Melahat Assan
- Emine Aydın
- Senem Çeyiz
- Bahar Güvenç
- Hülya Yeşil
- Derya Serin
- Handan Kasapoğlu
- Melike İlhan
- Sevgi Erdoğdu
- Reyhan Şeker
- Gamze İskeçeli
- Melis Özçiğdem
- Nihan Su
- Kezban Gülşen
- Perihan Sarak
- Yasemin Gül
- Selma İzitaş
- Hatice Şaşma

Head coach: (Turkey) Ali Kızılet

Group A

Team	Pld	W	D	L	GF	GA	GD	Pts
Republic of Ireland	3	2	1	0	9	3	+6	7
Chinese Taipei	3	1	1	1	8	7	+1	4
New Zealand	3	1	0	2	3	5	−2	3
Turkey	3	1	0	2	4	9	−5	3

Opponent	Result
Republic of Ireland	L 0-3
Chinese Taipei	L 5-2
New Zealand	W 2-1

Round Robin

Team	Pld	W	D	L	GF	GA	GD	Pts
New Zealand	3	2	1	0	8	4	+4	7
South Africa	3	2	0	1	10	6	+4	6
Czech Republic	3	1	1	1	6	5	+1	4
Turkey	2	0	0	2	11	9	+2	0

16 August 2005
18:00

Czech Republic	2–1	Turkey

18 August 2005
18:00

Turkey	0-1	New Zealand

20 August 2005
10:00

Turkey	1-8	South Africa

Final standing

Team	Rank
Turkey	12th

== Gymnastics ==
=== Artistic gymnastics ===
Men's

Haluk Coşkun, Kerem Venedik, Fatih Yıldız, Ekin Takmaz, Cumhur Zorba

Women's

Damla Kırsalı, Ebru Karaduman, Melike Cura, Reyhan Gürses, Özge Yıldırım

Athlete	Event	Total	Rank
Ebru Karaduman	Balance beam	8.212	11th
Ebru Karaduman	Uneven Bars	7.937	19th
Ebru Karaduman	Vault	8.325	23rd
Ebru Karaduman	Floor Exercise	7.800	21st

=== Rhythmic gymnastics ===
Başak Akar, Nihan Şahingöz, Yıldız Avcıbaşı, Sezen Çimen, Özlem Atakan, Merve Sinem Avaz, Deniz Atlı, Demet Tetik, Banu Seri

Athlete	Event	Result	Rank
Turkey team	Groups - Two Clubs, Three Hoops	22.125	5th

== Sailing ==
Men's

Güray Zünbül, Koray izer, Cem Duman, Hakan Karakaplan, Efe Karakaplan, Kemal Muslubaş, Deniz Çınar, Ateş Çınar

Athlete	Event	Rank
Kemal Muslubaş	Laser	2nd place, silver medalist(s)

Women's

Begüm Güngör, Pınar Yılmazer, Yonca Yıldıral, Burcu Balaban, Özüm Oğuzbayır

Athlete	Event	Total points	Net points	Rank
Yonca Yıldıral; Burcu Balaban	470	66	49	6th

== Swimming ==
Men's

Emre Çelık, Çağrı Sapmaz, Eren Onurlu, Mert Saygın, Engin Can Eter, Cenk Aktaş, Serkan Aydın, Aytekin Mindan, Gökhan Hülagü, Cem Paşaoğlu, Onat Tungaç, Kaan Tayla, Arda Köstem

Athlete	Event	Result	Rank
Kaan Tayla	50 m freestyle	22.95	7th

Women's

İlkay Dikmen, Burcu Dolunay, Derya Erke, Gizem Algiş, Fulya Terzi, Selin Bülbül, Sibel Piroğlu, Gamze Uçar, Gülşah Gönenç, Tuğçe Duygun, Jülide Yıldız, Zeynep Evrim İstan

Athlete	Event	Result	Rank
İlkay Dikmen	100 m backstroke	1:11.70	8th

== Taekwondo ==
Men's

Athlete	Event	Rank
Murat Boyalı	-58 kg	1st place, gold medalist(s)
Abtullah Sertçelik	-72 kg	2nd place, silver medalist(s)
Bahri Tanrıkulu	-84 kg	1st place, gold medalist(s)

Women's

Athlete	Event	Rank
Zeynep Murat	-55 kg	1st place, gold medalist(s)
Azize Tanrıkulu	-63 kg	1st place, gold medalist(s)
Sibel Güler	-67 kg	1st place, gold medalist(s)
Mehtap Yalçın	-72 kg	3rd place, bronze medalist(s)
Filiz Nur Aydın	+72 kg	2nd place, silver medalist(s)

== Tennis ==
Men's

Athlete	Event	1st Round	2nd Round	3rd Round	Quarterfinal	Result	Rank
Haluk Akkoyun	Men's Singles	(Sri Lanka) Petris; W 6-1, 6-3	(Armenia) Sarungulyan; W 6-3, 6-4	(Italy) Crugnola; W 6-7, 6-4, 6-4	(Serbia and Montenegro) Ciric; L 3-6, 5-7		DNQ
Bora Gerçeker; Esat Tanık	Men's Doubles	BYE	(Brazil) Mello-Rosa Neto; W 6-2, 6-2	(Germany) Grambow-Kunth; W 7-5, 4-6, 6-4	(Russia) D. Sitak-A. Sitak; L 3-6, 7-6, 3-9		DNQ

Women's

Athlete	Event	1st Round	2nd Round	Quarterfinal	Result	Rank
Pemra Özgen; Aslı Semizoğlu	Women's Doubles	(South Africa) Oosthuisen-Tshabalala; W 6-1, 6-2	(Russia) Bulykina-Golovizninz; L 0-6, 3-6	-	-	DNQ

Mixed

Athlete	Event	1st Round	2nd Round	Quarterfinal	Result	Rank
Pemra Özgen; Haluk Akkoyun	Mixed Doubles	(Serbia and Montenegro) Ćorović-Ciric; L 3-6, 6-7	-	-	-	DNQ

== Volleyball ==
Men's tournament
Team

- Nuri Şahin
- Özkan Hayırlı
- Emre Toktamış
- Ahmet Toçoğlu
- Ali Alp Çayır
- Volkan Güç
- Yasin Sancak
- Sinan Cem Tanık
- Can Ayvazoğlu
- Selçuk Keskin
- Hüseyin Koç
- Güner Mezgitçi

Head coach: (Turkey) Nedim Özbey

Playoff round
Quarterfinals

Date	Time		Score		Set 1	Set 2	Set 3	Set 4	Set 5	Total	Report
17 Aug		Turkey	3-1	Poland	27-25	25-18	23-25	28-26		103–0	

Semifinal
Quarterfinal match

Date	Time		Score		Set 1	Set 2	Set 3	Set 4	Set 5	Total	Report
18 Aug		Turkey	3-0	Italy	25-22	25-20	25-19			75–0	

Gold medal match
Quarterfinal match

Date	Time		Score		Set 1	Set 2	Set 3	Set 4	Set 5	Total	Report
20 Aug		Turkey	3-2	Japan	21-25	23-25	25-12	25-14	15-13	109–0	

Final standing

Team	Rank
Turkey	1st place, gold medalist(s)

Women's tournament
Team

- Deniz Hakyemez
- Pelin Çelik
- Gözde Kırdar
- Elif Ağca
- Neslihan Demir
- Seda Tokatlıoğlu
- Sinem Erdoğan
- Sinem Akap
- Duygu Bal
- Aslı Köprülü
- Güldeniz Önal
- Gülden Kayalar

Head coach: (Turkey) Ali Kızılet

Playoff round
Quarterfinals

Date	Time		Score		Set 1	Set 2	Set 3	Set 4	Set 5	Total	Report
18 Aug		Chinese Taipei	3-1	Turkey	24-26	25-18	25-23	25-19		99–0	

5th-8th Place match

Date	Time		Score		Set 1	Set 2	Set 3	Set 4	Set 5	Total	Report
19 Aug		Turkey	3-0	Russia	25-23	25-20	25-22			75–0	

5th Place match

Date	Time		Score		Set 1	Set 2	Set 3	Set 4	Set 5	Total	Report
20 Aug		Thailand	3-1	Turkey	25-21	25-23	16-25	26-24		92–0	

Final standing

Team	Rank
Turkey	6th

== Water polo ==
Tournament
Team

- Tan Diptaş
- Cemal Sargın
- Halil Beşkardeşler
- Oytun Okman
- Can Güven
- Emre Coşkun
- Anıl Sönmez
- Aytaç Yeğin
- Ruso Yakimoviç
- Sezai Kayhan Kızıltan
- Adnan Kefeli
- Michael Taylan
- Onur İhsan Gülsoy

Head coach: (Turkey) Sinan Turunç

Prelimibary Round

Group A

	Team	G	W	D	L	GF	GA	Diff	Points
1.	Turkey	3	3	0	0	39	21	+18	6
2.	Spain	3	2	0	1	39	21	+18	4
3.	Japan	3	1	0	2	33	22	+11	2
4.	Portugal	3	0	0	3	8	55	−47	0

Playoff Round
Quarterfinals

16 August 2005; 20:00	Turkey	9–8	Italy

Semifinal

18 August 2005; 20:00	Turkey	5–7	Serbia and Montenegro

Bronze medal match

19 August 2005; 18:30	Turkey	11–6	Russia

Final standing

Team	Rank
Turkey	3rd place, bronze medalist(s)

== Wrestling ==
Men's Freestyle

Athlete	Event	Rank
Tevfik Odabaşı	-60 kg	2nd place, silver medalist(s)
Fahrettin Özata	-74 kg	3rd place, bronze medalist(s)
Gökhan Yavaşer	-84 kg	3rd place, bronze medalist(s)
Hakan Koç	-96 kg	2nd place, silver medalist(s)
Sait Bingöl	-120 kg	1st place, gold medalist(s)

Men's Greco-Roman

Athlete	Event	Rank
Selçuk Çebi	-66 kg	1st place, gold medalist(s)
Şeref Tüfenk	-74 kg	1st place, gold medalist(s)
Hamdi Eraslankılıç	-96 kg	2nd place, silver medalist(s)
Yekta Yılmaz Gül	-120 kg	2nd place, silver medalist(s)

Women's Freestyle

Athlete	Event	Rank
Hatun Muhçu	-67 kg	2nd place, silver medalist(s)
