= Turkey at the 2015 Summer Universiade =

- IOC code: TUR
- NOC: Turkish Olympic Committee
- Website: www.olimpiyatkomitesi.org.tr

in Gwangju, South Korea 3 – 14 July 2015
- Competitors: 112 in 12 sports
- Medals Ranked 22nd: Gold 2 Silver 2 Bronze 12 Total 16

Summer Universiade appearances (overview)
- 1985; 1987; 1989; 1991; 1993; 1995; 1997; 1999; 2001; 2003; 2005; 2007; 2009; 2011; 2013; 2015; 2017; 2019; 2021; 2025; 2027

Turkey participated at the 2015 Summer Universiade, in Gwangju, South Korea.

== Competitors ==
Sport	Men	Women	Total
Archery	3	1	4
Athletics	7	7	14
Basketball	12	0	12
Fencing	2	1	3
Gymnastics	3	0	3
Handball	16	0	16
Judo	2	1	3
Shooting	5	0	5
Swimming	5	0	5
Taekwondo	11	11	22
Volleyball	0	12	12
Water polo	13	0	13
Total	79	33	112

== Medals by sport ==
Sport	Men				Women				Grand Total			
Sport	1st place, gold medalist(s)	2nd place, silver medalist(s)	3rd place, bronze medalist(s)	Total	1st place, gold medalist(s)	2nd place, silver medalist(s)	3rd place, bronze medalist(s)	Total	1st place, gold medalist(s)	2nd place, silver medalist(s)	3rd place, bronze medalist(s)	Total
Athletics	0	1	2	3	0	0	2	2	0	1	4	5
Fencing	0	0	1	1	0	0	0	0	0	0	1	1
Shooting	1	0	1	2	0	0	0	0	1	0	1	2
Taekwondo	1	0	1	2	0	1	5	6	1	1	6	8
Total	2	1	5	8	0	1	7	8	2	2	12	16

== Medalists ==
Medal	Name	Sport	Event	Date
Gold	Yavuz İlnam; Erdinç Kebapçı; Nedim Tolga Tuncer	Shooting	Men's team trap	6 July
Gold	Berkay Akyol	Taekwondo	Men's 68 kg	9 July
Silver	İrem Yaman	Taekwondo	Women's 62 kg	11 July
Silver	Aykut Taşdemir; Mehmet Akkoyun; Şeref Dirli; Vedat Günen	Athletics	Men's team half marathon	12 July
Bronze	Martino Minuto	Fencing	Men's individual foil	6 July
Bronze	Yavuz İlnam	Shooting	Men's trap	6 July
Bronze	Elif Aybüke Yılmaz	Taekwondo	Women's individual poomsae	7 July
Bronze	Bengü Alkan; Elif Aybüke Yılmaz; Fatma Törehan	Taekwondo	Women's team poomsae	8 July
Bronze	Ramil Guliyev	Athletics	Men's 100 metres	9 July
Bronze	Ramil Guliyev	Athletics	Men's 200 metres	10 July
Bronze	Özlem Kaya	Athletics	Women's 3000 metres steeplechase	10 July
Bronze	Rukiye Yıldırım	Taekwondo	Women's 49 kg	10 July
Bronze	Nur Tatar	Taekwondo	Women's 67 kg	10 July
Bronze	Ensar Uğuz	Taekwondo	Men's 87 kg	12 July
Bronze	Furkan Asena Aydın	Taekwondo	Women's 73 kg	12 July
Bronze	Burcu Büyükbezgin; Elif Tozlu; Nilay Ersun; Şeyma Yıldız; Yasemin Can	Athletics	Women's team half marathon	12 July

== Archery ==
Athlete	Event	Ranking Round		Round of 64	Round of 32	Round of 16	Quarterfinals	Semifinals	Final / BM	Rank
Athlete	Event	Score	Seed	Opposition Score	Opposition Score	Opposition Score	Opposition Score	Opposition Score	Opposition Score	Rank
Aykut Akdağ	Men's individual compound	656	48	(Malaysia) Zulfadhli Bin Ruslan (MAS) (17); L 143–143	Did not advance					33
Emre Çömez	Men's individual compound	681	19	(United Kingdom) Philip William Tucknott (GBR) (46); W 143–137	(Turkey) Evren Çağıran (TUR) (14); W 148–145	(Argentina) Santiago Nicolas Regnasco (ARG) (35); L 140–143	Did not advance			9
Evren Çağıran	Men's individual compound	682	14	(Mongolia) Tulga Jargalsaikhan (MGL) (51); W 145–132	(Turkey) Emre Çömez (TUR) (19); L 145–148	Did not advance				17
Aykut Akdağ; Emre Çömez; Evren Çağıran	Men's team compound	2019	11	—N/a		Belgium (BEL) (6); L 221–229	Did not advance			9
Yeşim Bostan	Women's individual compound	679	13	BYE	(Germany) Janine Meissner (GER) (20); W 139–136	(South Korea) Yun soo Song (KOR) (4); L 136–144	Did not advance			9
Evren Çağıran; Yeşim Bostan	Mixed team compound	1361	11	—N/a		India (IND) (6); L 150–150	Did not advance			9

== Athletics ==
Track & road events

Athlete	Event	Round 1		Round 2		Semifinal		Final	
Athlete	Event	Result	Rank	Result	Rank	Result	Rank	Result	Rank
Ramil Guliyev	Men's 100 metres	10.55	2 Q	10.40	3 Q	10.19	2 Q	10.16	3rd place, bronze medalist(s)
Ramil Guliyev	Men's 200 metres	21.30	2 Q	20.95	2 Q	20.68	2 Q	20.59 SB	3rd place, bronze medalist(s)
Levent Ateş	Men's 1500 metres	3:44.79	4 Q	—N/a				DSQ	
Mehmet Akkoyun	Men's 10,000 metres	—N/a						DNF	
Şeref Dirli	Men's 10,000 metres	—N/a						DNF	
Aykut Taşdemir	Men's half marathon	—N/a						1:10:25	22
Mehmet Akkoyun	Men's half marathon	—N/a						1:16:10	38
Şeref Dirli	Men's half marathon	—N/a						1:09:29	16
Vedat Günen	Men's half marathon	—N/a						1:06:21 PB	6
Aykut Taşdemir; Mehmet Akkoyun; Şeref Dirli; Vedat Günen	Men's team half marathon	—N/a						3:26:17	2nd place, silver medalist(s)
Elif Karabulut	Women's 5000 metres	16:21.94 PB	5 Q	—N/a				16:15.34 PB	11
Elif Karabulut	Women's 3000 metres steeplechase	—N/a						DNF	
Özlem Kaya	Women's 3000 metres steeplechase	—N/a						9:37.79	3rd place, bronze medalist(s)
Burcu Büyükbezgin	Women's half marathon	—N/a						1:34:50	21
Elif Tozlu	Women's half marathon	—N/a						1:22:18	14
Nilay Ersun	Women's half marathon	—N/a						1:16:57	5
Şeyma Yıldız	Women's half marathon	—N/a						1:18:21	9
Yasemin Can	Women's half marathon	—N/a						1:20:18	11
Burcu Büyükbezgin; Elif Tozlu; Nilay Ersun; Şeyma Yıldız; Yasemin Can	Women's team half marathon	—N/a						3:55:37	3rd place, bronze medalist(s)

Field events

Athlete	Event	Qualification		Final	
Athlete	Event	Distance	Position	Distance	Position
Alper Kulaksız	Men's long jump	7.32	8	Did not advance	

== Basketball ==
Men

Group D

Team	Pld	W	L	PF	PA	PD	Pts
United States	5	5	0	415	292	+123	10
Brazil	5	4	1	381	295	+86	9
Serbia	5	3	2	318	263	+55	8
Turkey	5	2	3	300	295	+5	7
Switzerland	5	1	4	273	370	−97	6
Chile	5	0	5	211	383	−172	5

4 July 2015
12:00

[http:// Report]

United States	66–57	Turkey
Scoring by quarter: 12–21, 20–15, 22–11, 12–10

Dongkang College Gymnasium

5 July 2015
18:00

[http:// Report]

Turkey	68–61	Switzerland
Scoring by quarter: 17–14, 14–16, 20–12, 17–19

Gwangju University Gymnasium

7 July 2015
14:30

[http:// Report]

Serbia	61–43	Turkey
Scoring by quarter: 16–3, 24–11, 5–9, 16–20

Gwangju University Gymnasium

8 July 2015
17:30

Report

Brazil	61–59	Turkey
Scoring by quarter: 21–10, 7–12, 23–21, 10–16

Dongkang College Gymnasium

9 July 2015
18:00

[http:// Report]

Turkey	73–46	Chile
Scoring by quarter: 24–14, 16–10, 13–13, 20–9

Gwangju University Gymnasium

9th–16th place

11 July 2015
14:30

Report

Australia	73–67	Turkey
Scoring by quarter: 12-12, 23-7, 21-29, 17-19

Muan Indoor Gymnasium

13th–16th place

12 July 2015
18:00

Montenegro	68–49	Turkey
Scoring by quarter: 21-12, 13-16, 14-10, 20-11

Gwangju University Gymnasium

15th place

13 July 2015
12:30

Report

Turkey	83–78	China
Scoring by quarter: 28–15, 13–21, 25–17, 17–25

Muan Indoor Gymnasium

== Gymnastics ==
=== Artistic ===
Men

Team all-around & Individual Qualification

Athlete	Event	Final							
Athlete	Event	Apparatus						Total	Rank
Athlete	Event	F	PH	R	V	PB	HB	Total	Rank
Ahmet Önder	Qualification	12.850	11.750	13.950	14.000	13.100	14.150	79.800	31
Ferhat Arıcan	Qualification	13.800	13.550	13.550	14.600 Q	15.250 Q	13.700	84.450	9 Q
Ibrahim Colak	Qualification	13.150	12.450	15.400 Q	12.800	14.300	12.950	81.050	21 Q
Total	Team	39.800 (16)	37.750 (13)	42.900 (4)	41.400 (15)	42.650 (7)	40.800 (7)	245.300	11

Qualification Legend: Q = Qualified to apparatus final

Individual all-around

Athlete	Event	Final							
Athlete	Event	Apparatus						Total	Rank
Athlete	Event	F	PH	R	V	PB	HB	Total	Rank
Ferhat Arıcan	Individual all-around	14.5	14.25	13.75	14.35	15.575	14	86.425	8
Ibrahim Colak	Individual all-around	13.3	12.05	15.2	12.75	14.42	12.65	80.375	17

Apparatus

Athlete	Event	Total	Rank
Ferhat Arıcan	Vault	14.483	7
Ferhat Arıcan	Parallel bars	15.341	4
İbrahim Çolak	Rings	15.133	4

== Handball ==
Men

Group A

Team	Pld	W	D	L	GF	GA	GD	Pts
Serbia	6	5	0	1	187	141	46	10
South Korea	6	5	0	1	200	148	52	10
Russia	6	4	1	1	183	123	60	9
Lithuania	6	3	1	2	187	145	42	7
Turkey	6	2	0	4	141	155	–14	4
Mexico	6	1	0	5	142	187	–45	2
United States	6	0	0	6	118	259	–141	0

7 July; 18:00	Serbia	25-15	Turkey	Naju Indoor Gymnasium, Naju
7 July; 18:00	Mester 7	(17-8)	Catkin 5	Naju Indoor Gymnasium, Naju
7 July; 18:00	3× (yellow card) 4× (suspension)	report	4× (yellow card) 4× (suspension)	Naju Indoor Gymnasium, Naju

8 July; 18:00	Turkey	25–24	Mexico	Gurye Indoor Gymnasium, Gurye
8 July; 18:00	Arifoglu, Catkin 5	(10–9)	Villalobos 6	Gurye Indoor Gymnasium, Gurye
8 July; 18:00	2× (yellow card) 8× (suspension)	Report	4× (suspension)	Gurye Indoor Gymnasium, Gurye

9 July; 18:00	Turkey	21–31	Russia	Naju Indoor Gymnasium, Naju
9 July; 18:00	Ersin 5	(11–15)	Voronin 7	Naju Indoor Gymnasium, Naju
9 July; 18:00	3× (yellow card) 3× (suspension)	Report	3× (yellow card) 3× (suspension)	Naju Indoor Gymnasium, Naju

10 July; 18:00	South Korea	29–23	Turkey	Gurye Indoor Gymnasium, Gurye
10 July; 18:00	Kwanjung 5	(15–10)	Ersin, Dege 5	Gurye Indoor Gymnasium, Gurye
10 July; 18:00	3× (yellow card) 5× (suspension)	Report	3× (yellow card) 12× (suspension) 1× (red card)	Gurye Indoor Gymnasium, Gurye

11 July; 18:00	Turkey	33–19	United States	Gochang County Gymnasium, Gochang
11 July; 18:00	four players with 6	(14–8)	Donlin 5	Gochang County Gymnasium, Gochang
11 July; 18:00	2× (yellow card) 4× (suspension)	Report	3× (yellow card)	Gochang County Gymnasium, Gochang

12 July; 18:00	Lithuania	27–24	Turkey	Gochang County Gymnasium, Gochang
12 July; 18:00	three players with 6	(13–11)	Erceylan 5	Gochang County Gymnasium, Gochang
12 July; 18:00	3× (yellow card) 3× (suspension)	Report	2× (yellow card) 4× (suspension)	Gochang County Gymnasium, Gochang

9th place

13 July; 10:00	Turkey	29–32	Hungary	Gochang County Gymnasium, Gochang
13 July; 10:00	Diri 9	(14–18)	Bali 8	Gochang County Gymnasium, Gochang
13 July; 10:00	3× (yellow card) 2× (suspension)	Report	3× (yellow card) 2× (suspension)	Gochang County Gymnasium, Gochang

== Judo ==
Men

Athlete	Event	1st Round	Round of 32	Round of 16	Quarterfinals	Semifinals/Repechage	Repechage	Final / BM	
Athlete	Event	Opposition Result	Opposition Result	Opposition Result	Opposition Result	Opposition Result	Opposition Result	Opposition Result	Rank

Women

Athlete	Event	Round of 32	Round of 16	Quarterfinals	Semifinals	Repechage	Final / BM	
Athlete	Event	Opposition Result	Opposition Result	Opposition Result	Opposition Result	Opposition Result	Opposition Result	Rank

Team

Event	Round of 32	Round of 16	Quarterfinals	Semifinals	Repechage	Final / BM	
Event	Opposition Result	Opposition Result	Opposition Result	Opposition Result	Opposition Result	Opposition Result	Rank

== Shooting ==
Men

Event	Athlete	Qualification		Final	
Event	Athlete	Score	Rank	Score	Rank

Women

Event	Athlete	Qualification		Final	
Event	Athlete	Score	Rank	Score	Rank

== Taekwondo ==
Men

Athlete	Event	Round of 32	Round of 16	Quarterfinals	Semifinals	Repechage	Bronze Medal	Final	
Athlete	Event	Opposition Result	Opposition Result	Opposition Result	Opposition Result	Opposition Result	Opposition Result	Opposition Result	Rank

Women

Athlete	Event	Round of 32	Round of 16	Quarterfinals	Semifinals	Repechage	Bronze Medal	Final	
Athlete	Event	Opposition Result	Opposition Result	Opposition Result	Opposition Result	Opposition Result	Opposition Result	Opposition Result	Rank

== Volleyball ==
=== Women ===
Group D

Pos	Team	Pld	W	L	Pts	SW	SL	SR	SPW	SPL	SPR	Qualification
1	Thailand	3	2	1	7	8	4	2.000	269	226	1.190	Quarterfinals
2	Canada	3	2	1	6	8	5	1.600	280	231	1.212	Quarterfinals
3	Turkey	3	2	1	5	7	5	1.400	275	214	1.285	
4	Zimbabwe	3	0	3	0	0	9	0.000	72	225	0.320	

Date	Time		Score		Set 1	Set 2	Set 3	Set 4	Set 5	Total	Report
4 Jul	20:00	Canada	2–3	Turkey	19–25	25–23	16–25	25–22	14–16	99–111	Report
5 Jul	18:00	Turkey	1–3	Thailand	22–25	25–22	23–25	19–25		89–97	Report
6 Jul	18:00	Zimbabwe	0–3	Turkey	5–25	8–25	5–25			18–75	Report

9th–16th place

Date	Time		Score		Set 1	Set 2	Set 3	Set 4	Set 5	Total	Report
8 Jul	15:00	Turkey	2–3	Switzerland	21–25	25–16	25–16	23–25	12–15	106–97	Report

13th–16th place

Date	Time		Score		Set 1	Set 2	Set 3	Set 4	Set 5	Total	Report
9 Jul	13:00	Chile	1–3	Turkey	10–25	26–24	17–25	13–25		66–99	Report

13th–16th place

Date	Time		Score		Set 1	Set 2	Set 3	Set 4	Set 5	Total	Report
10 Jul	15:00	Turkey	3–0	South Korea	25–5	25–23	25–17			75–45	Report

== Water polo ==
Men

Group B

Team	Pld	W	D	L	GF	GA	GD	Pts
Russia	5	5	0	0	59	35	+24	10
United States	5	4	0	1	50	43	+7	8
Serbia	5	2	1	2	51	37	+14	5
Japan	5	1	2	2	56	65	-9	4
Turkey	5	0	2	3	46	57	−11	2
China	5	0	1	4	38	63	−25	1

2 July; 18:30	Report	Serbia	10–6	Turkey	Yeomju Indoor Aquatics Center, Gwangju; Referees: Gabor Boros-Djevi (AUS); Chen Ziliang (CHN)
2 July; 18:30	Report	Score by quarters: 1–1, 2–2, 2–2, 5–1			Yeomju Indoor Aquatics Center, Gwangju; Referees: Gabor Boros-Djevi (AUS); Chen Ziliang (CHN)

4 July; 14:00	Report	Turkey	8–12	United States	Yeomju Indoor Aquatics Center, Gwangju; Referees: Nikolaos Boudramis (GRE); Erwin Schapers (NED)
4 July; 14:00	Report	Score by quarters: 3–3, 1–2, 2–5, 2–2			Yeomju Indoor Aquatics Center, Gwangju; Referees: Nikolaos Boudramis (GRE); Erwin Schapers (NED)

6 July; 12:30	Japan	12–12	Turkey	Yeomju Indoor Aquatics Center, Gwangju

8 July; 12:30	China	11–11	Turkey	Yeomju Indoor Aquatics Center, Gwangju

10 July; 15:30	Russia	12–9	Turkey	Yeomju Indoor Aquatics Center, Gwangju

9th–13th place

12 July; 14:00	Turkey	8–9	Brazil	Yeomju Indoor Aquatics Center, Gwangju

13 July; 14:00	South Korea	7–16	Turkey	Yeomju Indoor Aquatics Center, Gwangju

14 July; 09:00	Turkey	9–19	Netherlands	Yeomju Indoor Aquatics Center, Gwangju
