= Gymnastics at the 2015 Summer Universiade – Men's vault =

Men's vault at the 2015 Summer Universiade
- Venue: Gwangju Women's University Universiade Gymnasium
- Date: July 7, 2015
- Competitors: 8 from 6 nations

Medalists
| gold medal | Cen Yu | China |
| silver medal | Ihor Radivilov | Ukraine |
| bronze medal | Oleh Vernyayev | Ukraine |

The Men's vault Gymnastics at the 2015 Summer Universiade in Gwangju was held on 7 July at the Gwangju Women's University Universiade Gymnasium.

== Schedule ==
All times are Korea Standard Time (UTC+09:00)

| Date | Time | Event |
|---|---|---|
| Tuesday, 7 July 2015 | 16:00 | Final |

== Results ==
| Rank | Athlete | vault 1 | vault 2 | Total |
|---|---|---|---|---|
| 1st place, gold medalist(s) | Cen Yu (CHN) | 15.333 | 15.433 | 15.383 |
| 2nd place, silver medalist(s) | Igor Radivilov (UKR) | 15.133 | 15.166 | 15.149 |
| 3rd place, bronze medalist(s) | Oleg Verniaiev (UKR) | 15.066 | 15.100 | 15.083 |
| 4 | Huang Xi (CHN) | 15.266 | 14.800 | 15.033 |
| 5 | Tomi Tuuha (FIN) | 14.666 | 14.991 | 14.828 |
| 6 | Heikki Saarenketo (FIN) | 14.975 | 14.433 | 14.704 |
| 7 | Ferhat Arican (TUR) | 14.800 | 14.166 | 14.483 |
| 8 | Mikhail Kudashov (RUS) | 13.400 | 14.500 | 13.950 |
