= Turkey at the 2021 Summer World University Games =

- Flag of Turkey
- IOC code: TUR

in Chengdu, China 28 July 2023 – 8 August 2023
- Competitors: 107 (58 men and 49 women)
- Medals Ranked 6th: Gold 11 Silver 12 Bronze 12 Total 35

Summer World University Games appearances
- 1985; 1987; 1989; 1991; 1993; 1995; 1997; 1999; 2001; 2003; 2005; 2007; 2009; 2011; 2013; 2015; 2017; 2019; 2021; 2025; 2027

Turkey competed at the 2021 Summer World University Games in Chengdu, China held from 28 July to 8 August 2023.

== Medal summary ==
=== Medal by sports ===
Rank	Sports	Gold	Silver	Bronze	Total
1	Athletics	8	7	3	18
2	Taekwondo	2	3	4	9
3	Rowing	1	0	1	2
4	Wushu	0	2	2	4
5	Artistic gymnastics	0	0	1	1
5	Table tennis	0	0	1	1
Totals (6 entries)		11	12	12	35

=== Medalists ===
Medal	Name	Sport	Event	Day
Gold	Eda Tuğsuz	Athletics	Women's javelin throw	3 August
Gold	Meryem Bekmez	Athletics	Women's 20 kilometres walk	5 August
Gold	Salih Korkmaz	Athletics	Men's 20 kilometres walk	5 August
Gold	Tuğba Danışmaz	Athletics	Women's triple jump	5 August
Gold	Sezgin Ataç	Athletics	Men's half marathon	6 August
Gold	Sezgin Ataç; Mahsum Değer; Abdurrahman Gediklioğlu; Ömer Amaçtan; Ayetullah Aslanhan	Athletics	Men's half marathon team	6 August
Gold	Burcu Subatan; Fatma Karasu; Yayla Gönen; Derya Kunur	Athletics	Women's half marathon team	6 August
Gold	Hakan Reçber	Taekwondo	Men's 63 kg	3 August
Gold	Emre Kutalmış Ateşli	Taekwondo	Men's +87 kg	2 August
Gold	Enes Gök	Rowing	Lightweight men's single sculls	6 August
Gold	İlyas Çanakçı; Kubilay Ençü; Berke Akçam; İsmail Nezir	Athletics	Men's 4 × 400 metres relay	6 August
Silver	Yayla Gönen	Athletics	Women's 10,000 metres	1 August
Silver	Sezgin Ataç	Athletics	Men's 10,000 metres	2 August
Silver	Necati Er	Athletics	Men's triple jump	3 August
Silver	İsmail Nezir	Athletics	Men's 400 metres hurdles	4 August
Silver	Semra Karaslan	Athletics	Women's 3000 metres steeplechase	4 August
Silver	Merve Dinçel	Taekwondo	Women's 49 kg	1 August
Silver	İkra Kayır	Taekwondo	Women's 67 kg	1 August
Silver	Mervenur Erdem	Taekwondo	Women's 73 kg	3 August
Silver	Mehmet Demirci	Wushu	Men's sanda 52 kg	31 July
Silver	Yayla Gönen	Athletics	Women's half marathon	6 August
Silver	Ayetullah Aslanhan	Athletics	Men's half marathon	6 August
Silver	Berna Tut	Wushu	Women's sanda 60 kg	31 July
Bronze	Muhammed Emir Yılmaz	Taekwondo	Men's Individual poomsae	27 July
Bronze	Bilal Küskü	Taekwondo	Men's 58 kg	1 August
Bronze	Ferhat Can Kavurat	Taekwondo	Men's 68 kg	31 July
Bronze	Esra Akbulak	Taekwondo	Women's +73 kg	2 August
Bronze	Fatma Karasu	Athletics	Women's 10,000 metres	1 August
Bronze	İbrahim Gündüz; Abdullah Yiğenler	Table tennis	Men's doubles	4 August
Bronze	Adem Asil	Artistic gymnastics	Men's rings	5 August
Bronze	Hayriye Türksoy Hançer	Wushu	Women's sanda 52 kg	31 July
Bronze	Nusret Altunkaya	Wushu	Men's sanda 70 kg	1 August
Bronze	Ahmet Ali Kabadayi; Kaan Yılmaz Aydın; Aydın İnanç Şahin; Ulaş Kurt	Rowing	Men's coxless four	6 August
Bronze	Fatma Karasu	Athletics	Women's half marathon	6 August
Bronze	Şilan Ayyıldız	Athletics	Women's 1500 metres	6 August

== Competitors ==
Team Turkey have selected a squad of 97 athletes to compete in the 2021 Summer World University Games

Sport	Men	Women	Total
Archery	2	2	4
Athletics	21	18	39
Badminton	2	2	4
Fencing	2	2	4
Gymnastics	5	2	7
Judo	3	3	6
Rowing	5	0	5
Shooting	2	5	7
Table Tennis	4	4	8
Taekwondo	9	9	18
Wushu	3	3	6
Total	56	41	97
