= Turkey at the 2013 Summer Universiade =

- IOC code: TUR

in Kazan
- Competitors: 82 in 10 sports
- Medals Ranked 29th: Gold 2 Silver 0 Bronze 5 Total 7

Summer Universiade appearances (overview)
- 1985; 1987; 1989; 1991; 1993; 1995; 1997; 1999; 2001; 2003; 2005; 2007; 2009; 2011; 2013; 2015; 2017; 2019; 2021; 2025; 2027

Turkey competed at the 2013 Summer Universiade in Kazan, Russia from 6 July to 17 July 2013. A total of 82 athletes were a part of the Turkish team competing in ten sports branches.

Turkey won seven medals (29th place), including two gold and five bronze medals.

== Medal table ==
Sport	Gold	Silver	Bronze	Total
Athletics	0	0	2	2
Beach volleyball	0	0	0	0
Belt wrestling	0	0	0	0
Boxing	0	0	1	1
Football	0	0	0	0
Gymnastics, artistic	0	0	0	0
Judo	0	0	0	0
Synchronized swimming	0	0	0	0
Weightlifting	0	0	1	1
Wrestling	2	0	1	3
Total	2	0	5	7

== Athletics ==
Men's

Athlete	Event	Heat #1		Heat #2		Round 2		Semifinal		Final	
Athlete	Event	Time	Rank	Time	Rank	Time	Rank	Time	Rank	Time	Rank
Ramil Guliyev	200 metres	21.47	2	20.84	3	20.84	4	20.84	5		DNQ
Doruk Uğurer	200 metres	22.32	42								DNQ
Yavuz Can	400 metres	47.93	16			46.65	10				DNQ
Mehmet Güzel	400 metres	47.48	13			47.41	16				DNQ
Kemal Koyuncu	5000 metres	14:12.10	7								DNF
Vedat Günen	10,000 metres										DNF
Hakan Duvar	3000 metres steeplechase	8:49.06	3							8:57.69	9th
Yavuz Can; Mehmet Güzel; Halit Kılıç; Buğrahan Kocabeyoğlu (Final); Doruk Uğurer (Heat)	4 × 400 metres relay	3:09.84	3							3:06.36	4th
Muzaffer Bayram	Half marathon									1:08:24 PB	19th
Mehmet Çağlayan	Half marathon									1:09:30 SB	27th
Vedat Günen	Half marathon									1:08:42	23rd
Hasan Pak	Half marathon									1:06:15	13th

Athlete	Event	#1	#2	#3	#4	#5	#6	Result	Rank
Serhat Birinci	High jump	1.85 -	1.95 -	2.05 -	2.10 -	2.15 xo	2.20 xxx	2.15	DNQ
Alper Kulaksız	Long jump	x	x	7.58				7.58	q
Alper Kulaksız	Long jump	x	7.68	x	x	x	7.58	7.68 SB	7th
Aşkın Karaca	Triple jump	x	15.61	15.56				15.61	q
Aşkın Karaca	Triple jump	x	16.27	-	x	-	x	16.27	5th
Hüseyin Atıcı	Shot put	18.36	18.85	18.83				18.85	q
Hüseyin Atıcı	Shot put	x	19.34	x	19.04	x	19.05	19.34	6th
Fatih Avan	Javelin throw	72.73							Q
Fatih Avan	Javelin throw	75.55	73.09	74.26	81.24	x	x	81.24	3rd place, bronze medalist(s)

Women's

Athlete	Event	Heat		Final	
Athlete	Event	Time	Rank	Time	Rank
Tuğba Koyuncu	1500 metres	4:15.93	1	4:18.62	10th
Dudu Karakaya	5000 metres			16:12.77	5th
Özge Akın	400 metres hurdles	1:01.67	17		DNQ
Derya Yıldırım	400 metres hurdles	1:02.31	18		DNQ
Gülcan Mıngır	3000 metres steeplechase			9:45.88	(bronze) /DQ
Özge Akın; Sema Apak; Dudu Karakaya; Tuğba Koyuncu; Meliz Redif; Derya Yıldırım	4 × 400 metres relay			3:40.68	4th

Athlete	Event	#1	#2	#3	#4	#5	#6	Result	Rank
Burcu Yüksel	High jump	1.65 -	1.70 -	1.75; 0	1.80 o	1.84 o		1.84	q
Burcu Yüksel	High jump	1.75 o	1.80 xo	1.84 xo	1.87 xo	1.90 xxx		1.87	6th
Sevim Serbest Sinmez	Long jump	5.90	x	x				5.90	DNQ
Sevim Serbest Sinmez	Triple jump	12.87	13.07	13.06	13.00			13.07	q
Sevim Serbest Sinmez	Triple jump	13.31	11.44					13.31	9th

== Beach volleyball ==
=== Men's tournament ===
Team: Hakan Göğtepe, Volkan Göğtepe

Preliminary round

Group J

Pos	Team	Pld	W	L	Pts	SW	SL	SR	SPW	SPL	SPR
1	(Poland) Kadliola–Szalankkiewic	3	3	0	6	0	0	—	132	105	1.257
2	(Turkey) Gogtepe H.–Gogtepe P.	3	2	1	5	4	4	1.000	147	151	0.974
3	(Italy) Cecchini–Morichelli	3	1	2	4	3	5	0.600	160	163	0.982
4	(United States) Carlos–Hughes	3	0	3	3	2	6	0.333	135	165	0.818

Team	Match #1	Match #2	Match #3	Qualification
Hakan Göğtepe; Volkan Göğtepe	(Italy) Cecchini-Morichelli; W 2–1 (18–21, 21–12, 27–25)	(Poland) Kadliola-Szalankkiewic; L 0–2 (16–21, 10–21)	(United States) Carlos-Hughes; W 2–1 (21–17, 19–21, 15–13)	Winners-Top half

Playoff round

Team	1st Round	17th–24th Place	13th–16th Place	Result
Hakan Göğtepe; Volkan Göğtepe	(Norway) Retterholt-Solhaug; L 0–2 (17–21, 15–21)	(China) Gong-Li; W 2–0 (21–13, 21–16)	(Mexico) Gomez-Pulido; L 0–2 (11–21, 20–22)	13th

== Belt wrestling ==
Men's Classic style

Athlete	Event	Round of 16	Quarterfinal	Repechage	Semifinal	Final	Rank
Ahmet Gökbayrak	−90 kg	(Ukraine) Leonid Riabchun; L 0–4, 0–0	DNA		–	–	10th

Men's Freestyle

Athlete	Event	Round of 16	Quarterfinal	Repechage	Semifinal	Final	Rank
Ahmet Gökbayrak	−90 kg	(Georgia (country)) Rudolph Oganezov; L 1–3, 4–7	DNA		–	–	9th

Women's Freestyle

Athlete	Event	Round of 16	Quarterfinal	Repechage	Semifinal	Final	Rank
Sevim Gayretli	−58 kg	BYE	(Japan) Katsuki Sakagami; L 0–5, 0–0	(Kyrgyzstan) Burul Alykulova; L 0–5, 0–0		DNA	5th

== Boxing ==
Men's

Athlete	Event	Qualification	Round of 16	Quarter-finals	Semi-finals	Finals	Rank
Onur Şipal	Welterweight	(Ukraine) Denys Lazarev; W 3–0	(Turkmenistan) Serdar Hudayberdiyev; W 3–0	(Italy) Dario Morello; W 3–0	(Russia) Andrei Zamkovoi; L 0–3	–	3rd place, bronze medalist(s)
Burak Aksın	Light heavyweight	(Italy) Simone Fiori; L 1–2	DNA	–	–	–	DNQ
Yusuf Açık	Super heavyweight	(Italy) Mario Federici; L 0–3	DNA	–	–	–	DNQ

== Football ==
Men's tournament
Team

- Akın Alkan
- Mehmet Alaeddinoğlu
- Kürşat Ergün Aydın
- Fatih Çakır
- Recep Onur Çelik
- Bahadır Davran
- Gür Ege Gürel
- Adem İnanç
- Cenk Kaplan
- Umut Kaya
- Abdülkadir Kuzey
- Caner Nurgör
- Sinan Osmanoğlu
- Eser Şen
- Doğan Takıl
- Yusuf Türk
- Çağlar Yıldırım
- Gökhan Yılmaz

Preliminary round

Pool B
Team	Pld	W	D	L	GF	GA	GD	Pts
Japan	3	3	0	0	9	1	+8	9
Ukraine	3	1	1	1	6	7	−1	4
Uruguay	3	0	2	1	3	4	−1	2
Turkey	3	0	1	2	2	8	−6	1

5 July 2013
14:00

Japan	4–0	Turkey
Nagasawa 12' (pen.); Chajima 72'; Akasaki 79'; Shimoda 83'	Report

Rubin Stadium
Referee: Kulasande Qongqo (South Africa)
8 July 2013
17:00

Uruguay	1–1	Turkey
Dávila 46'	Report	Sen 17'

Trudovye Rezervy Stadium
Referee: Tan Hai (China PR)
10 July 2013
17:00

Ukraine	3–1	Turkey
Galenko 50'; Kravchenko 59'; Kifa 90+4'	Report	Cakir 61'

Trudovye Rezervy Stadium
Referee: Alexandr Aliyev (Kazakhstan)

Playoff round
9th–16th place

12 July 2013
17:00

Italy	4–0	Turkey
Muratori 42'; Degeri 48'; Ricci 67'; Parodi 89'	Report

Olymp Stadium
Referee: Sergiu Derenov (Moldova)

13th–16th place

14 July 2013
17:00

Turkey	2–1	Peru
Alaeddinoglu 4'; Turk 78'	Report	Arenas 83'

Olymp Stadium
Referee: Yudai Yamamoto (Japan)

13th place game

16 July 2013
14:00

Turkey	4–2	Brazil
Yıldırım 13'; Çakır 24'; Alaeddinnoğlu 44'; Osmanoğlu 89'	Report	Berger 16' (pen.); Paixão 46'

Olymp Stadium
Referee: Tan Hai (China)

Final standing

Rank	Team	W-D-L Record
13	Turkey	2–1–3

Scorers

- : Mehmet Alaeddinoğlu, Fatih Çakır
- : Eser Şen, Sinan Osmanoğlu, Yusuf Türk, Çağlar Yıldırım

== Gymnastics, artistic ==
Men's
Individual all-around

Athlete	Floor (gymnastics)	Pommel horse	Rings (gymnastics)	Vault (gymnastics)	Uneven bars	Balance beam	Total	Rank
Ferhat Arıcan	14.050	12.050	13.200	13.650	15.000	13.300	81.250	35th

Parallel bars

Athlete	Parallel bars	Rank
Ferhat Arıcan	15.000	14th

== Judo ==
Men's

Athlete	Event	3rd Round	Repechage	2nd Round	1st Round	Final	Rank
Ahmet Şahin Kaba	Lightweight	(South Korea) Kim Won-jin; L 0–1, 0–1, 0–1	(Czech Republic) Pavel Petřikov; L 0–1, 0–0, 0–0	(Uzbekistan) Bakhrom Inoyatov; W 0–0, 1–0, 1–0	DNA		9th
Hasan Vanlıoğlu	Middleweight	BYE	BYE	(Italy) Andrea Regis; L 0–0, 0–0, 0–1, 2–2	DNA		17th

Women's

Athlete	Event	Qualification	Round of 16	Quarterfinal	Semifinal	Final/Bronze medal	Rank
Ebru Şahin	Bantamweight	(Romania) Violeta Dumitru; W 0–0, 0–0, 4–0	(Chile) Antonieta Galleguillos; W 1–0, 0–0, 1–0	(Poland) Ewa Konieczny; W 1–0, 0–0, 1–0	(France) Scarlett Gabrielli; L 1–0, 0–1, 0–0	(Ukraine) Maryna Cherniak; L 0–1, 0–0, 0–0	5th
Tuğba Zehir	Featherweight	(France) Helene Receveaux; L 0–1, 0–0, 0–1	DNA	–	–	–	17th

== Synchronized swimming ==
Women's

Athlete	Event	Technical Routine			Free Routine			Total	Rank
Athlete	Event	Execution	Impression	Total	Technical Merit	Artistic Merit	Total	Total	Rank
Melis Öner	Solo	37.700	38.100	75.800	37.820	37.510	75.330	151.130	7th
Laçin İrazca Akçal; Yağmur Demircan	Duet	35.600	36.700	72.300	36.420	36.220	72.640	144.940	8th

== Weightlifting ==
Men's

Athlete	Event	Snatch				Clean&Jerk				Total	Rank
Athlete	Event	#1	#2	#3	Result	#1	#2	#3	Result	Total	Rank
Ekrem Ağıllı	−69 kg	130	135	137	137	150	155	158	158	295	9th

Women's

Athlete	Event	Snatch				Clean&Jerk				Total	Rank
Athlete	Event	#1	#2	#3	Result	#1	#2	#3	Result	Total	Rank
Hacer Demirel	−48 kg	~~63~~	63	65	65	77	81	~~83~~	81	146	8th
Ayşegül Çoban	−53 kg	79	~~82~~	~~82~~	79	110	~~116~~	~~116~~	110	189	3rd place, bronze medalist(s)
Emine Şensoy	−58 kg	80	82	~~84~~	82	95	99	102	102	184	8th
Hatice Demirel	−63 kg	77	~~80~~	~~80~~	77	100	104	105	105	182	12th
Assiya İpek	−69 kg	83	~~86~~	86	86	95	98	100	100	186	13th
Figen Kaya	−75 kg	86	89	~~91~~	89	108	110	~~113~~	110	199	11th

== Wrestling ==
Men's Greco-Roman

Athlete	Event	Qualification	Round of 16	Quarterfinal	Repechage	Semifinal	Final/Bronze medal	Rank
Ferhat Tekin	-55 kg	(Russia) Ivan Tatarinov; L 0–8	DNA					DNQ
Abdülsamet Uğurlu	-60 kg	BYE	(Egypt) Abou Halima; W 5–1, 3–0	(Georgia (country)) Tornike Turkishvili; L 3–3, 0–7		DNA		9th
Muhammet Kocatınaz	-66 kg	(Belarus) Yaraslau Kardash; W 1–0, 3–0	(Moldova) Mihail Cosnicean; W 8–2, 2–0	(Azerbaijan) Rasul Chunayev; L 0–6	(Poland) Grzegorz Wanke; W 1–0, 5–2	–	(Iran) Afshin Byabangard; W 1–0, 1–1	3rd place, bronze medalist(s)
Osman Köse	-74 kg	(Hungary) László Szabó; W 8–0	(Tajikistan) Akhmad Kadyrow; W 7–0	(Azerbaijan) Elvin Mursaliyev; L 1–2, 3–5		DNA		7th
Aslan Atem	-84 kg	(Ukraine) Zhan Beleniuk; L 1–0, 0–3	DNA					17th
Süleyman Demirci	-96 kg	BYE	(Armenia) Artur Aleksanyan; L 0–7		(Lithuania) Vilius Laurinaitis; W 3–3	(Iran) Mahdi Aliyarifeizabadi; L 0–6		5th
Rıza Kayaalp	-120 kg	(Kazakhstan) Nurmakhan Tinaliyev; W 1–0, 1–0	(Ukraine) Igor Didyk; W 3–0, 1–0	(Egypt) Hamdy Abdelwahab; W 3–0, 4–0		(Russia) Sergey Andrusik; W 3–0, 0–0	(Iran) Amir Aliakbari; W 1–2, 2–0	1st place, gold medalist(s)

Men's Freestyle

Athlete	Event	Qualification	Round of 16	Quarterfinal	Repechage	Semifinal	Final/Bronze medal	Rank
Ziya Daylak	-55 kg	BYE	(Ukraine) Lyubomyr Lytvynchuk; W 6–2, 5–7	(Georgia (country)) Otari Gogava; L 0–8		DNA		9th
Münir Recep Aktaş	-60 kg	(Lithuania) Sarunas Jurcys; W 9–2	(Turkmenistan) Ramil Rejepov; W 9–0	(Russia) Bekkhan Goygereev; L 0–6, 2–4	(North Korea) Ryang Won Chol; L 1–4, 0–5		DNA	7th
Mustafa Kaya	-66 kg	BYE	(Azerbaijan) Aghahuseyn Mustafayev; L 9–10, 2–8	DNA				14th
Musa Gürbüz	-74 kg	(Kazakhstan) Nurlan Bekzhanov; L 2–0, 0–3	DNA					17th
Serdar Böke	-84 kg	(Moldova) Piotr Ianulov; L 2–2, 0–6	DNA					20th
Mustafa Özdemir	-96 kg	BYE	(Ukraine) Pavlo Oliinyk; L 0–8		(Tajikistan) Iskandari Rustam; W 0–0	(Kazakhstan) Alikhan Jumayev; L 0–8		5th
Taha Akgül	-120 kg	BYE	(Iran) Parviz Hadi Basmanj; W 9–0	(Azerbaijan) Jamaladdin Magomedov; W 1–0, 2–2		(Russia) Alan Khugaev; W 0–1, 6–2	(Ukraine) Oleksandr Khostianivskyi; W 4–0, 4–0	1st place, gold medalist(s)

Women's Freestyle

Athlete	Event	Qualification	Round of 16	Quarterfinal	Repechage	Semifinal	Final/Bronze medal	Rank
Burcu Kebiç	-55 kg	(United States) Sarah Hildebrandt; L 4–2, 0–9	DNA					12th
Hafize Şahin	-63 kg	(Azerbaijan) Irina Netreba; L 0–8	DNA					14th
