= Athletics at the 2021 Summer World University Games – Women's 10,000 metres =

Athletics event

The women's 10,000 metres event at the 2021 Summer World University Games was held on 1 August 2023 at the Shuangliu Sports Centre Stadium in Chengdu, China.

== Medalists ==
Gold	Silver	Bronze
Xia Yuyu; China	Yayla Gönen; Turkey	Fatma Karasu; Turkey

== Results ==
Rank	Name	Nationality	Time	Notes
1st place, gold medalist(s)	Xia Yuyu	China	33:48.35	
2nd place, silver medalist(s)	Yayla Gönen	Turkey	34:05.03	
3rd place, bronze medalist(s)	Fatma Karasu	Turkey	34:10.97	
4	Ma Xiuzhen	China	34:30.14	
5	Risa Yamazaki	Japan	34:35.96	
6	Mélanie Allier	France	34:37.50	
7	Maria Kassou	Greece	34:50.65	
8	Silke Jonkman	Netherlands	35:07.58	
9	Tomo Muramatsu	Japan	35:17.54	
10	Basanti Kumari	India	35:51.40	
11	Niu Lihua	China	36:17.40	
12	Poonam Sonuke	India	37:12.77	
13	Marte Johnsen	Norway	37:24.06	
14	Lesego Mpshe	South Africa	37:34.68	
–	Estefanía Aristizábal	Colombia	DNF	
–	Hanane Bouaggad	Morocco	DNS	
–	Elisa Palmero	Italy	DNS	
