= Gymnastics at the 2015 Summer Universiade – Men's rings =

Men's rings at the 2015 Summer Universiade
- Venue: Gwangju Women's University Universiade Gymnasium
- Date: July 7, 2015
- Competitors: 8 from 6 nations

Medalists
gold medal	Artur Tovmasyan	Armenia
silver medal	Ihor Radivilov	Ukraine
bronze medal	Oleh Vernyayev	Ukraine

The Men's rings at the 2015 Summer Universiade in Gwangju was held on 7 July at the Gwangju Women's University Universiade Gymnasium.

== Schedule ==
All times are Korea Standard Time (UTC+09:00)

Date	Time	Event
Tuesday, 7 July 2015	12:45	Final

== Results ==
Rank	Athlete	Score
1st place, gold medalist(s)	Artur Tovmasyan (ARM)	15.500
2nd place, silver medalist(s)	Igor Radivilov (UKR)	15.266
3rd place, bronze medalist(s)	Oleg Verniaiev (UKR)	15.166
4	Ibrahim Colak (TUR)	15.133
5	Chen Chih-Yu (TPE)	15.100
6	Shogo Nonomura (JPN)	14.966
7	Yuya Kamoto (JPN)	14.700
8	Azizbek Kudratullayev (KAZ)	12.050
