= Turkey at the 2011 Summer Universiade =

- IOC code: TUR

in Shenzhen
- Competitors: 81 in 8 sports
- Medals Ranked 10th: Gold 6 Silver 7 Bronze 8 Total 21

Summer Universiade appearances (overview)
- 1985; 1987; 1989; 1991; 1993; 1995; 1997; 1999; 2001; 2003; 2005; 2007; 2009; 2011; 2013; 2015; 2017; 2019; 2021; 2025; 2027

Turkey competed at the 2011 Summer Universiade in Shenzhen, Guangdong, China from 12 August to 23 August 2011. A total of 81 athletes were a part of the Turkish team competing in eight sports branches.

Turkey finished in ninth position on the medal tally, including seven gold, seven silver and eight bronze medals.

== Medal table ==
Sport	Gold	Silver	Bronze	Total
Athletics	4	3	1	9
Basketball	0	0	0	0
Chess	0	0	0	0
Judo	0	0	1	1
Taekwondo	2	4	4	10
Volleyball 0	0	0	0	0
Weightlifting	0	0	2	2
Total	7	7	8	22

== Athletics ==
Men's

Athlete	Event	Result	Rank
Halil Akkaş	3000 metres steeplechase	8:34.57 SB	2nd place, silver medalist(s)
Fatih Bilgic	Half marathon	1:06:20	2nd place, silver medalist(s)
Fatih Avan	Javelin throw	83.79 m	1st place, gold medalist(s)

Women's

Athlete	Event	Result	Rank
Binnaz Uslu	5000 metres	15:41.15 PB	1st place, gold medalist(s)
Fadime Suna	10,000 metres	33:11.92	1st place, gold medalist(s)
Nagihan Karadere	400 metres hurdles	55.81	3rd place, bronze medalist(s)
Binnaz Uslu	3000 metres steeplechase	19:33.50 PB	1st place, gold medalist(s)
Nagihan Karadere; Merve Aydın; Meliz Redif; Pınar Saka	4 × 400 metres relay	3:30.14	2nd place, silver medalist(s)

== Basketball ==
Turkey has qualified a men's team.

Men's tournament

== Chess ==
Turkey has qualified a men's and women's team.

== Judo ==
Men's

Women's

Athlete	Even	Rank
Belkız Zehra Kaya	Heavyweight (+78kg)	3rd place, bronze medalist(s)

== Taekwondo ==
Men's

Athlete	Event	Rank
Erdal Aldemir	-54 kg	3rd place, bronze medalist(s)
Serkan Tok	-63 kg	3rd place, bronze medalist(s)
Umut Bildik	-58 kg	1st place, gold medalist(s)
Yunus Sarı	-80 kg	2nd place, silver medalist(s)
Burak Eski	-87 kg	3rd place, bronze medalist(s)
Ali Sarı	+87 kg	2nd place, silver medalist(s)

Women's

Athlete	Event	Rank
Rukiye Yıldırım	-46 kg	2nd place, silver medalist(s)
Hatice Kübra Yangın	-53 kg	1st place, gold medalist(s)
Furkan Asena Aydın	-67 kg	2nd place, silver medalist(s)
Tuba Abus	+73 kg	3rd place, bronze medalist(s)

== Volleyball ==
Turkey has qualified a men's team.

Men's tournament

== Water polo ==
Turkey has qualified a men's team.

Men's tournament

== Weightlifting ==
Men's

Athlete	Event	Total	Rank
Ibrahim Arat	-94 kg	373	3rd place, bronze medalist(s)

Women's

Athlete	Event	Total	Rank
Seda İnce	-63 kg	203	3rd place, bronze medalist(s)
