= Sonja Kokkonen =

Finnish rhythmic gymnast (born 1996)

- Born: 30 July 1996 (age 30) Espoo, Finland

Gymnastics career
- Discipline: Rhythmic gymnastics
- Country represented: Finland; (2013-2016)
- Club: Gymnastics and Sports Club Elise
- Head coach: Laura Ahonen
- Retired: yes
Medal record
Group Rhythmic Gymnastics
Representing Finland
Summer Universiade
Bronze medal – third place	2015 Gwangju	All-Around
Bronze medal – third place	2015 Gwangju	5 Ribbons

Sonja Kokkonen (born 30 July 1996) is a Finnish retired rhythmic gymnast. She represented her country in international competitions.

== Career ==
Sonja took up the sport at age five. In 2013, she was a member of the Finnish group that competed at the World Championships in Kyiv, along Solja Sade, Jenni Kaita,Riikka Kangas, Heleri Kolkkanen and Aino Purje, she was 20th in the All-Around.

In June 2014, she, Riikka Kangas, Heleri Kolkkanen, Elina Koprinen, Kristina Lapina and Aino Purje participated in the European Championships in Baku finishing 12th overall, 13th with 10 clubs and 10th with 3 balls & 2 ribbons. In September the group finished 17th in the All-Around, 15th with 5 pairs of clubs and 19th in the mixed event at the World Championships in Izmir.

She was at the 2015 European Games Finland was 11th in the All-Around qualification and did not advance to finals. In July the group won two bronze medals in the All-Around and with 5 ribbons at the 2015 Summer Universiade in Gwangju. Two months later Sonja,Heleri Kolkkanen, Elina Koprinen, Iina Linna, Aino Purje and Kati Rantsi competed at the World Championships in Stuttgart, being 15th overall, 14th with 10 clubs and 13th with 3 balls & 2 ribbons.

In February 2016, she took part in the World Cup in Espoo, taking 5th place in the All-Around and with 5 ribbons and 6th in the mixed event. In April they competed at the Olympic Test Event in Rio de Janeiro ending in 4th place, narrowingly missing the Olympic qualification. At the European Championships in Holon the Finnish group was 7th in the All-Around, 10th with 5 ribbon and 5th in the mixed event.
