= Iina Alexandra Linna =

Finnish rhythmic gymnast

- Born: 22 August 1995 (age 31) Espoo, Finland

Gymnastics career
- Discipline: Rhythmic gymnastics
- Country represented: Finland (2015-2016)
- Club: Gymnastics and Sports Club Elise
- Head coach: Laura Ahonen
- Retired: yes
Medal record
Group Rhythmic Gymnastics
Representing Finland
Summer Universiade
Bronze medal – third place	2015 Gwangju	All-Around
Bronze medal – third place	2015 Gwangju	5 Ribbons

Iina Alexandra Linna (born 22 August 1995) is a Finnish retired rhythmic gymnast. She represented her country in international competitions.

== Career ==
Iina began competing in the sport in 2003. At the 2015 European Games Finland was 11th in the All-Around qualification and did not advance to finals. In July the group won two bronze medals in the All-Around and with 5 ribbons at the 2015 Summer Universiade in Gwangju. Two months later Iina, Heleri Kolkkanen, Elina Koprinen, Sonja Kokkonen, Aino Purje and Kati Rantsi competed at the World Championships in Stuttgart, being 15th overall, 14th with 10 clubs and 13th with 3 balls & 2 ribbons.

In February 2016 she took part in the World Cup in Espoo, taking 5th place in the All-Around and with 5 ribbons and 6th in the mixed event. In April they competed at the Olympic Test Event in Rio de Janeiro ending in 4th place, narrowingly missing the Olympic qualification. At the European Championships in Holon the Finnish group was 7th in the All-Around, 10th with 5 ribbon and 5th in the mixed event.
