= Heleri Kolkkanen =

Finnish rhythmic gymnast

- Born: 23 June 1997 (age 29) Tallinn, Estonia

Gymnastics career
- Discipline: Rhythmic gymnastics
- Country represented: Finland; (2013-2015)
- Head coach: Laura Ahonen
- Retired: yes
Medal record
Group Rhythmic Gymnastics
Representing Finland
Summer Universiade
Bronze medal – third place	2015 Gwangju	All-Around
Bronze medal – third place	2015 Gwangju	5 Ribbons

Heleri Kolkkanen (born 23 June 1997) is a Finnish retired rhythmic gymnast. She represented her country in international competitions.

== Career ==
Heleri entered the Finnish national senior group in 2013 competing at the World Championships in Kyiv, along Solja Sade, Jenni Kaita, Riikka Kangas, Sonja Kokkonen and Aino Purje, she was 20th in the All-Around.

In June 2014 her, Riikka Kangas, Sonja Kokkonen, Elina Koprinen, Kristina Lapina and Aino Purje participated in the European Championships in Baku finishing 12th overall, 13th with 10 clubs and 10th with 3 balls & 2 ribbons. In September the group finished 17th in the All-Around, 15th with 5 pairs of clubs and 19th in the mixed event at the World Championships in Izmir.

At the 2015 European Games Finland was 11th in the All-Around qualification and did not advance to finals. In July the group won two bronze medals in the All-Around and with 5 ribbons at the 2015 Summer Universiade in Gwangju. Two months later Heleri, Sonja Kokkonen, Elina Koprinen, Iina Linna, Aino Purje and Kati Rantsi competed at the World Championships in Stuttgart, being 15th overall, 14th with 10 clubs and 13th with 3 balls & 2 ribbons.
