= Turkey at the 2019 Summer Universiade =

- Flag of Turkey
- IOC code: TUR

in Naples, Italy 3 July 2019 – 14 July 2019
- Medals Ranked 14th: Gold 4 Silver 5 Bronze 5 Total 14

Summer Universiade appearances (overview)
- 1985; 1987; 1989; 1991; 1993; 1995; 1997; 1999; 2001; 2003; 2005; 2007; 2009; 2011; 2013; 2015; 2017; 2019; 2021; 2025; 2027

Turkey competed at the 2019 Summer Universiade in Naples, Italy held from 3 to 14 July 2019.

== Medal summary ==
=== Medal by sports ===
Medals by sport
Archery	1	2	1	4
Athletics	1	2	1	4
Gymnastics	0	1	1	2
Judo	0	0	2	2
Taekwondo	2	0	0	2

=== Medalists ===
Medal	Name	Sport	Event	Date
Gold	İrem Yaman	Taekwondo	Women's 62 kg	July 11
Gold	Nafia Kuş	Taekwondo	Women's 73 kg	July 11
Gold	Süleyman Araz; Muhammed Yetim	Archery	Men's Compound Team	July 12
Gold	Özkan Baltacı	Athletics	Men's Hammer Throw	July 10
Silver	Alperen Acet	Athletics	Men's High Jump	July 11
Silver	Muhammed Yetim	Archery	Men's Compound Individual	July 11
Silver	Yeşim Bostan; Gizem Elmaağaçlı	Archery	Women's Compound Team	July 12
Silver	Saffet Elkatmış; Ferhat Bozkurt; Ersin Tekal	Athletics	Men's Half Marathon Team	July 13
Silver	İbrahim Çolak	Artistic Gymnastics	Men's Rings	July 8
Bronze	Yeşim Bostan	Archery	Women's Compound Individual	July 10
Bronze	Ahmet Önder	Artistic Gymnastics	Men's Parallel Bars	July 10
Bronze	Sebile Akbulut	Judo	Women's +70 kg	July 8
Bronze	Sebile Akbulut	Judo	Women's Open Weight	July 9
