= Turkey at the 2009 Summer Universiade =

- IOC code: TUR

in Belgrade
- Competitors: 88
- Medals Ranked 23rd: Gold 2 Silver 2 Bronze 5 Total 9

Summer Universiade appearances (overview)
- 1985; 1987; 1989; 1991; 1993; 1995; 1997; 1999; 2001; 2003; 2005; 2007; 2009; 2011; 2013; 2015; 2017; 2019; 2021; 2025; 2027

Turkey competed at the 2009 Summer Universiade in Belgrade, Serbia from 1 July to 12 July 2009. A total of 88 athletes were a part of the Turkish team.

Turkey won nine medals (23rd place), including two gold, two silver and five bronze medals.

== Medal table ==
Sport	Gold	Silver	Bronze	Total
Athletics	2	1	1	4
Judo	0	0	1	1
Taekwondo	0	1	3	4
Total	2	2	5	9

== Athletics ==
Men's

Athlete	Event	Result	Rank
Halil Akkaş	5000 metres	14:06.96	1st place, gold medalist(s)
Halil Akkaş	3000 metres steeplechase	8:25.80	2nd place, silver medalist(s)

Women's

Athlete	Event	Result	Rank
Türkan Erişmiş	3000 metres steeplechase	9:38.87	3rd place, bronze medalist(s)
Nevin Yanıt	100 metres hurdles	12.89	1st place, gold medalist(s)

== Judo ==
Women's

Athlete	Event	Rank
Belkıs Zehra Kaya	Open	3rd place, bronze medalist(s)

== Taekwondo ==
Men's

Athlete	Event	Rank
Remzi Başakbuğday	-54 kg	2nd place, silver medalist(s)
Onur Cam	-58 kg	3rd place, bronze medalist(s)
Serdar Yüksel	-84 kg	3rd place, bronze medalist(s)

Women's

Athlete	Event	Rank
Büşra Yıldız	+72 kg	3rd place, bronze medalist(s)
