= Kati Iina Rantsi =

Finnish rhythmic gymnast

- Born: 23 January 1996 (age 30) Jarvenpaa, Finland

Gymnastics career
- Discipline: Rhythmic gymnastics
- Country represented: Finland (2012-2016)
- Club: Gymnastics and Sports Club Elise
- Head coach: Laura Ahonen
- Retired: yes
Medal record
Group Rhythmic Gymnastics
Representing Finland
Summer Universiade
Bronze medal – third place	2015 Gwangju	All-Around
Bronze medal – third place	2015 Gwangju	5 Ribbons

Kati Iina Rantsi (born 23 January 1996) is a Finnish retired rhythmic gymnast. She represented her country in international competitions.

== Career ==
Kati took up gymnastics at age five, in 2012 she entered the national team. In September 2014 she made her World Championships' debut in Izmir competing with hoop and ball, she was 52nd and 53 with the apparatuses and 14th in teams.

In May 2015 she competed in the World Cup in Lisbon, being 39th in the All-Around, 32nd with hoop, 24th with ball, 46th with clubs and 40th with ribbon. A week later, in Bucharest, she finished 27th in the All-Around, 26th with hoop, 25th with ball, 17th with clubs and 35th with ribbon. Mid year she was included into the national senior group, being selected for the 2015 European Games where the group was 11th in the All-Around qualification and did not advance to finals. In July they won two bronze medals in the All-Around and with 5 ribbons at the 2015 Summer Universiade in Gwangju. Two months later Kati, Heleri Kolkkanen, Elina Koprinen, Iina Linna, Aino Purje and Sonja Kokkonen competed at the World Championships in Stuttgart, being 15th overall, 14th with 10 clubs and 13th with 3 balls & 2 ribbons.

In February 2016 she took part in the World Cup in Espoo, taking 5th place in the All-Around and with 5 ribbons and 6th in the mixed event. In April they competed at the Olympic Test Event in Rio de Janeiro ending in 4th place, narrowingly missing the Olympic qualification. At the European Championships in Holon the Finnish group was 7th in the All-Around, 10th with 5 ribbon and 5th in the mixed event.
