= Turkey at the 2017 Summer Universiade =

- IOC code: TUR
- NOC: Turkish Olympic Committee
- Website: www.olimpiyatkomitesi.org.tr

in Taipei, Taiwan 19 – 30 July 2017
- Competitors: 85 in 9 sports
- Medals Ranked 19th: Gold 3 Silver 7 Bronze 6 Total 16

Summer Universiade appearances (overview)
- 1985; 1987; 1989; 1991; 1993; 1995; 1997; 1999; 2001; 2003; 2005; 2007; 2009; 2011; 2013; 2015; 2017; 2019; 2021; 2025; 2027

Turkey participated at the 2017 Summer Universiade, in Taipei, Taiwan.

== Medal summary ==
=== Medal by sports ===
Medals by sport
Sport	1st place, gold medalist(s)	2nd place, silver medalist(s)	3rd place, bronze medalist(s)	Total
Archery	0	2	1	3
Athletics	1	2	2	5
Fencing	0	1	0	1
Gymnastics Artistic	0	1	0	1
Swimming	0	0	1	1
Taekwondo	2	1	1	4
Wushu	0	0	1	1
Total	3	7	6	16
