= Turkey at the FISU World University Games =

Turkey at the Universiade
- IOC code: TUR
- Medals: Gold 50 Silver 59 Bronze 70 Total 179

Summer appearances
- 1959−1983; 1985; 1987; 1989; 1991; 1993; 1995; 1997; 1999; 2001; 2003; 2005; 2007; 2009; 2011; 2013; 2015; 2017; 2019

Winter appearances
- 1960−2005; 2007; 2009; 2011; 2013; 2015; 2017; 2019

Turkey participates at the Universiade.

== Medal count ==
=== Summer ===
As of August 2023, Turkey has won 159 medals in 23 appearances at the Summer Universiade and one silver in winter.

Year	Place					Rank
1977	Bulgaria, Sofia	0	0	1	1	22
1979	Mexico, Mexico City	No Medals				
1981	Romania, Bucharest	No Medals				
1983	Canada, Edmonton	No Medals				
1985	Japan, Kobe	No Medals				
1987	Yugoslavia, Zagreb	No Medals				
1989	Germany, Duisburg	0	1	0	1	24th
1991	United Kingdom, Sheffield	No Medals				
1993	United States, Buffalo	No Medals				
1995	Japan, Fukuoka	No Medals				
1997	Italy, Sicily	No Medals				
1999	Spain, Palma de Mallorca	No Medals				
2001	China, Beijing	1	0	0	1	28th
2003	South Korea, Daegu	0	2	0	2	33rd
2005	Turkey, İzmir	10	11	6	27	8th
2007	Thailand, Bangkok	3	3	4	10	17th
2009	Serbia, Belgrade	2	2	5	9	23rd
2011	China, Shenzhen	6	7	8	21	10th
2013	Russia, Kazan	2	0	4	6	29th
2015	South Korea, Gwangju	2	2	12	16	22nd
2017	Chinese Taipei Taipei	3	7	6	16	20th
2019	Italy, Naples	4	5	5	14	14th
2021	China, Chengdu	11	12	12	35	6th
2025	Germany, Rhine-Ruhr	6	5	7	18	8th
Total		50	59	70	175	

=== Winter ===
- 2011 Winter Universiade - 1 Silver
- Figure skating at the 2011 Winter Universiade

== Doping ==
Turkey at the 2013 Summer Universiade - Athletics at the 2013 Summer Universiade – Women's 3000 metres steeplechase - Gülcan Mıngır

== See also ==
- Turkey at the Olympics
- Turkey at the Paralympics
- Turkey at the Mediterranean Games
