= Belarus at the 2015 Summer Universiade =

- IOC code: BLR
- NOC: Belarusian Olympic Committee

in Gwangju, South Korea 3 – 14 July 2015
- Competitors: 24 in 8 sports
- Medals Ranked 16th: Gold 4 Silver 3 Bronze 5 Total 12

Summer Universiade appearances
- 1959; 1961; 1963; 1965; 1967; 1970; 1973; 1975; 1977; 1979; 1981; 1983; 1985; 1987; 1989; 1991; 1993; 1995; 1997; 1999; 2001; 2003; 2005; 2007; 2009; 2011; 2013; 2015; 2017; 2019; 2021

Belarus participated at the 2015 Summer Universiade in Gwangju, South Korea.

== Medal summary ==
=== Medal by sports ===
Medals by sport
| Sport | 1st place, gold medalist(s) | 2nd place, silver medalist(s) | 3rd place, bronze medalist(s) | Total |
|---|---|---|---|---|
| Athletics | 1 | 1 | 1 | 3 |
| Gymnastics-Rhythmic | 1 | 1 | 2 | 4 |
| Rowing | 0 | 0 | 1 | 1 |
| Swimming | 1 | 1 | 1 | 3 |
| Tennis | 1 | 0 | 0 | 1 |
| Total | 4 | 3 | 5 | 12 |

=== Medalists ===
| Medal | Name | Sport | Event | Date |
