= Turkey at the 2007 Summer Universiade =

- IOC code: TUR

in Bangkok
- Medals Ranked 17th: Gold 3 Silver 3 Bronze 4 Total 10

Summer Universiade appearances (overview)
- 1985; 1987; 1989; 1991; 1993; 1995; 1997; 1999; 2001; 2003; 2005; 2007; 2009; 2011; 2013; 2015; 2017; 2019; 2021; 2025; 2027

Turkey competed at the 2007 Summer Universiade in Bangkok, Thailand from 8 August to 18 August 2007.

Turkey won nine medals (17th place), including three gold, three silver and four bronze medals.

== Medal table ==
Sport	Gold	Silver	Bronze	Total
Athletics	2	1	1	4
Judo	0	1	0	1
Taekwondo	0	1	3	4
Volleyball	1	0	0	1
Total	3	3	4	10

== Athletics ==
Men's

Athlete	Event	Result	Rank
Halil Akkaş	5000 metres	14:08.47	1st place, gold medalist(s)
Halil Akkaş	3000 metres steeplechase	8:20.83 CR	1st place, gold medalist(s)

Women's

Athlete	Event	Result	Rank
Türkan Erişmiş	3000 metres steeplechase	9:46.12 PB	3rd place, bronze medalist(s)
Nevin Yanit	100 metres hurdles	13.07	2nd place, silver medalist(s)

== Judo ==
Women's

Athlete	Event	Rank
Belkıs Zehra Kaya	+78 kg	2nd place, silver medalist(s)

== Taekwondo ==
Men's

Athlete	Event	Rank
Ayhan Kurt	-54 kg	3rd place, bronze medalist(s)
Ali Sarı	-84 kg	3rd place, bronze medalist(s)

Women's

Athlete	Event	Rank
Özge Gök	-51 kg	3rd place, bronze medalist(s)
Sibel Güler	-67 kg	2nd place, silver medalist(s)

== Volleyball ==
Men's tournament

Final standing

Team	Rank
Turkey	1st place, gold medalist(s)
