= Gymnastics at the 2015 Summer Universiade – Men's floor =

Men's floor at the 2015 Summer Universiade
- Venue: Gwangju Women's University Universiade Gymnasium
- Date: July 7, 2015
- Competitors: 8 from 6 nations

Medalists
gold medal	Naoto Hayasaka	Japan
silver medal	Oleh Vernyayev	Ukraine
bronze medal	Shogo Nonomura	Japan

The Men's floor Gymnastics at the 2015 Summer Universiade in Gwangju was held on 7 July at the Gwangju Women's University Universiade Gymnasium.

== Schedule ==
All times are Korea Standard Time (UTC+09:00)

Date	Time	Event
Tuesday, 7 July 2015	11:00	Final

== Results ==
Rank	Athlete	Score
1st place, gold medalist(s)	Naoto Hayasaka (JPN)	15.666
2nd place, silver medalist(s)	Oleg Verniaiev (UKR)	14.933
3rd place, bronze medalist(s)	Shogo Nonomura (JPN)	14.900
4	Marco Walter (SUI)	14.900
5	Fabian Hambuechen (GER)	14.833
6	Kevin Patrick Rossi (SUI)	14.633
7	Akash Modi (USA)	14.466
8	Heikki Saarenketo (FIN)	14.300
