= Gymnastics at the 2015 Summer Universiade – Men's parallel bars =

Men's parallel bars at the 2015 Summer Universiade
- Venue: Gwangju Women's University Universiade Gymnasium
- Date: July 7, 2015
- Competitors: 8 from 7 nations

Medalists
gold medal	Oleh Vernyayev	Ukraine
silver medal	Yuya Kamoto	Japan
bronze medal	Chihiro Yoshioka	Japan

The Men's floor Gymnastics at the 2015 Summer Universiade in Gwangju was held on 7 July at the Gwangju Women's University Universiade Gymnasium.

== Schedule ==
All times are Korea Standard Time (UTC+09:00)

Date	Time	Event
Tuesday, 7 July 2015	17:05	Final

== Results ==
Rank	Athlete	Score
1st place, gold medalist(s)	Oleg Verniaiev (UKR)	16.000
2nd place, silver medalist(s)	Yuya Kamoto (JPN)	15.900
3rd place, bronze medalist(s)	Chihiro Yoshioka (JPN)	15.600
4	Ferhat Arican (TUR)	15.341
5	Akash Modi (USA)	15.200
6	Cen Yu (CHN)	14.966
7	Jo Yeong-gwang (KOR)	14.866
8	Volodymyr Okachev (UKR)	14.566
