= Athletics at the 2005 Summer Universiade – Men's half marathon =

The men's half marathon event at the 2005 Summer Universiade was held on 20 August in İzmir, Turkey.

== Results ==
Rank	Athlete	Nationality	Time	Notes
1st place, gold medalist(s)	Wilson Busienei	Uganda	1:03:47	
2nd place, silver medalist(s)	Takayuki Tagami	Japan	1:03:48	
3rd place, bronze medalist(s)	Fadil Mohamed	Morocco	1:03:52	SB
4	Kosaku Hoshina	Japan	1:03:59	
5	Takeshi Kumamoto	Japan	1:04:35	
6	Karim El Mabchour	Morocco	1:04:55	
7	Han Gang	China	1:04:58	PB
8	Joseph Nsubuga	Uganda	1:04:59	PB
9	Francis Yiga	Uganda	1:05:18	SB
10	Brahim Chettah	Algeria	1:05:29	PB
11	Keizo Maruyama	Japan	1:05:36	
12	Heo Jong-Kyu	South Korea	1:05:59	
13	Abdil Ceylan	Turkey	1:06:13	
14	Abdelaziz Azzouzi	Morocco	1:06:24	
15	Dmytro Baranovskyy	Ukraine	1:06:30	
16	Jonnatan Morales	Mexico	1:06:37	PB
17	Francis Kasagule	Uganda	1:06:54	PB
18	Selahattin Selçuk	Turkey	1:07:13	
19	Lajos Berec	Hungary	1:07:16	
20	Samuel Kosgei	Uganda	1:07:33	
21	Vinny Mulvey	Ireland	1:07:46	
22	Lusapho April	South Africa	1:07:51	
23	Reto Dietiker	Switzerland	1:08:00	
24	Eom Hyo-Seok	South Korea	1:08:28	
25	Jonathan Monje	Chile	1:08:33	
26	Bekir Karayel	Turkey	1:09:22	
27	Entaifa Farat	Libya	1:10:20	
28	Jussi Utriainen	Finland	1:10:51	
29	David Kim Møller	Denmark	1:10:55	
30	Vesa Erojärvi	Finland	1:11:19	
31	David Valterio	Switzerland	1:13:38	
32	Geofrey Wamaniala	Uganda	1:19:10	
33	Joakim Fayiah	Liberia	1:22:13	
34	Georgi Georgiev	Bulgaria	1:23:07	
35	Vishant Kumar	Fiji	1:23:20	
	Léopold Gahungu	Rwanda	DNS	
	Leonard Halerimana	Rwanda	DNS	
