= Gymnastics at the 2015 Summer Universiade =

Gymnastics at the XXVIII Summer Universiade
- Venue: Gwangju Women's University Gymnasium
- Dates: July 4, 2015 – July 13, 2015

Gymnastics was contested at the 2015 Summer Universiade from July 4 to 13 at the Gwangju Women's University Gymnasium in Gwangju, South Korea. Artistic and rhythmic gymnastics were the two disciplines of gymnastics contested.

== Medal table ==
| Rank | Nation | Gold | Silver | Bronze | Total |
|---|---|---|---|---|---|
| 1 | Russia (RUS) | 6 | 3 | 4 | 13 |
| 2 | Ukraine (UKR) | 4 | 7 | 4 | 15 |
| 3 | Japan (JPN) | 3 | 8 | 4 | 15 |
| 4 | South Korea (KOR) | 3 | 3 | 1 | 7 |
| 5 | Belarus (BLR) | 1 | 1 | 2 | 4 |
| 6 | Great Britain (GBR) | 1 | 1 | 1 | 3 |
| 7 | United States (USA) | 1 | 0 | 1 | 2 |
| 8 | Armenia (ARM) | 1 | 0 | 0 | 1 |
| 8 | China (CHN) | 1 | 0 | 0 | 1 |
| 8 | Germany (GER) | 1 | 0 | 0 | 1 |
| 11 | Finland (FIN) | 0 | 0 | 2 | 2 |
| 12 | Portugal (POR) | 0 | 0 | 1 | 1 |
| 12 | Switzerland (SUI) | 0 | 0 | 1 | 1 |
| Totals (13 entries) | | 22 | 23 | 21 | 66 |

== Medal summary ==
=== Artistic gymnastics ===
The artistic gymnastics competition contested from July 4 to July 7.

==== Men's events ====
| Event | Gold | Silver | Bronze |
|---|---|---|---|
| Team all-around | Japan (JPN); Chihiro Yoshioka; Kaito Imabayashi; Naoto Hayasaka; Shogo Nonomura; Yuya Kamoto | South Korea (KOR); Yang Hak-seon; Lee Hyeok-jung; Lee Jun-ho; Park Min-soo; Jo Yeong-gwang | Ukraine (UKR); Volodymyr Okachev; Ihor Radivilov; Mykyta Yermak; Oleh Vernyayev; Vitalii Arseniev |
| Individual all-around | Oleh Vernyayev; Ukraine | Shogo Nonomura; Japan | Akash Modi; United States |
| Floor | Naoto Hayasaka; Japan | Oleh Vernyayev; Ukraine | Shogo Nonomura; Japan; Marco Walter; Switzerland |
| Pommel horse | Donothan Bailey; United States | Naoto Hayasaka; Japan | Akash Modi; United States |
| Rings | Artur Tovmasyan; Armenia | Ihor Radivilov; Ukraine | Oleh Vernyayev; Ukraine |
| Vault | Cen Yu; China | Ihor Radivilov; Ukraine | Oleh Vernyayev; Ukraine |
| Parallel bars | Oleh Vernyayev; Ukraine | Yuya Kamoto; Japan | Chihiro Yoshioka; Japan |
| Horizontal bar | Fabian Hambüchen; Germany | Shogo Nonomura; Japan | Yuya Kamoto; Japan |

==== Women's events ====
| Event | Gold | Silver | Bronze |
|---|---|---|---|
| Team all-around | Russia (RUS); Polina Fedorova; Daria Elizarova; Maria Paseka; Alla Sidorenko; Ekaterina Kramarenko | Japan (JPN); Asuka Teramoto; Natsumi Sasada; Wakana Inoue; Sakura Yumoto; Yu Minobe | South Korea (KOR); Heo Seon-mi; Eum Da-yeon; Park Ji-soo; Park Eun-kyung; Park Se-yeon |
| Individual all-around | Kelly Simm; Great Britain | Asuka Teramoto; Japan | Natsumi Sasada; Japan |
| Vault | Maria Paseka; Russia | Kelly Simm; Great Britain | Daria Elizarova; Russia |
| Uneven bars | Ekaterina Kramarenko; Russia | Asuka Teramoto; Japan | Maria Paseka; Russia |
| Balance beam | Yu Minobe; Japan | Polina Fedorova; Russia | Ana Filipa Martins; Portugal |
| Floor | Polina Fedorova; Russia | Daria Elizarova; Russia | Kelly Simm; Great Britain |

=== Medal table ===
| Rank | Nation | Gold | Silver | Bronze | Total |
|---|---|---|---|---|---|
| 1 | Russia (RUS) | 4 | 2 | 2 | 8 |
| 2 | Japan (JPN) | 3 | 7 | 4 | 14 |
| 3 | Ukraine (UKR) | 2 | 3 | 3 | 8 |
| 4 | Great Britain (GBR) | 1 | 1 | 1 | 3 |
| 5 | United States (USA) | 1 | 0 | 1 | 2 |
| 6 | Armenia (ARM) | 1 | 0 | 0 | 1 |
| 6 | China (CHN) | 1 | 0 | 0 | 1 |
| 6 | Germany (GER) | 1 | 0 | 0 | 1 |
| 9 | South Korea (KOR) | 0 | 1 | 1 | 2 |
| 10 | Portugal (POR) | 0 | 0 | 1 | 1 |
| 10 | Switzerland (SUI) | 0 | 0 | 1 | 1 |
| Totals (11 entries) | | 14 | 14 | 14 | 42 |

=== Rhythmic gymnastics ===
The rhythmic gymnastics competition contested from July 11 to July 13.

==== Individual ====
| Event | Gold | Silver | Bronze |
|---|---|---|---|
| Individual all-around | Son Yeon-jae; South Korea | Ganna Rizatdinova; Ukraine | Melitina Staniouta; Belarus |
| Individual hoop | Son Yeon-jae; South Korea | Maria Titova; Russia | Melitina Staniouta; Belarus |
| Individual ball | Son Yeon-jae; South Korea | Ganna Rizatdinova; Ukraine | Maria Titova; Russia |
| Individual clubs | Ganna Rizatdinova; Ukraine | Son Yeon-jae; South Korea | None awarded |
| Individual clubs | Ganna Rizatdinova; Ukraine | Melitina Staniouta; Belarus | None awarded |
| Individual ribbon | Melitina Staniouta; Belarus | Son Yeon-jae; South Korea | Ganna Rizatdinova; Ukraine |

==== Group ====
| Event | Gold | Silver | Bronze |
|---|---|---|---|
| Group all-around | Russia (RUS); Anastasia Osipova; Arina Nikishova; Daria Avtonomova; Daria Kolobova; Iuliia Kosyreva; Valentina Kalinina | Ukraine (UKR); Anastasiia Mulmina; Oleksandra Gridasova; Olena Dmytrash; Valeriia Gudym; Yevgeniya Gomon | Finland (FIN); Sonja Kokkonen; Heleri Kolkkanen; Iina Alexandra Linna; Aino Riikka Purje; Kati Iina Rantsi |
| Group 5 ribbons | Russia (RUS); Anastasia Osipova; Arina Nikishova; Daria Avtonomova; Daria Kolobova; Iuliia Kosyreva; Valentina Kalinina | Ukraine (UKR); Anastasiia Mulmina; Oleksandra Gridasova; Olena Dmytrash; Valeriia Gudym; Yevgeniya Gomon | Finland (FIN); Sonja Kokkonen; Heleri Kolkkanen; Iina Alexandra Linna; Aino Riikka Purje; Kati Iina Rantsi |
| Group 6 clubs + 2 hoops | Ukraine (UKR); Anastasiia Mulmina; Oleksandra Gridasova; Olena Dmytrash; Valeriia Gudym; Yevgeniya Gomon | Japan (JPN); Asuka Ono; Ayano Sato; Konatsu Arai; Mana Tsutsumi; Minori Shindo; Rina Miura | Russia (RUS); Anastasia Osipova; Arina Nikishova; Daria Avtonomova; Daria Kolobova; Iuliia Kosyreva; Valentina Kalinina |

=== Medal table ===
| Rank | Nation | Gold | Silver | Bronze | Total |
|---|---|---|---|---|---|
| 1 | South Korea (KOR) | 3 | 2 | 0 | 5 |
| 2 | Ukraine (UKR) | 2 | 4 | 1 | 7 |
| 3 | Russia (RUS) | 2 | 1 | 2 | 5 |
| 4 | Belarus (BLR) | 1 | 1 | 2 | 4 |
| 5 | Japan (JPN) | 0 | 1 | 0 | 1 |
| 6 | Finland (FIN) | 0 | 0 | 2 | 2 |
| Totals (6 entries) | | 8 | 9 | 7 | 24 |
