= Volleyball at the 2017 Summer Universiade – Women's tournament =

The 2017 Women's Summer Universiade Volleyball Tournament was the 17th edition of the event, organized by the Summer Universiade. It was held in Taipei, Taiwan from 21 to 28 August 2017.

== Results ==
All times are Taiwan Standard Time (UTC+08:00)

=== Preliminary round ===
==== Group A ====
Pos	Team	Pld	W	L	Pts	SW	SL	SR	SPW	SPL	SPR	Qualification
1	Chinese Taipei	3	3	0	9	9	1	9.000	246	179	1.374	Quarterfinals
2	France	3	2	1	6	6	3	2.000	208	172	1.209	Quarterfinals
3	Czech Republic	3	1	2	3	4	7	0.571	221	251	0.880	
4	Colombia	3	0	3	0	1	9	0.111	175	248	0.706	

Date	Time		Score		Set 1	Set 2	Set 3	Set 4	Set 5	Total	Report
21 Aug	15:00	France	0–3	Chinese Taipei	23–25	17–25	18–25			58–75	P2 P3
21 Aug	18:00	Colombia	1–3	Czech Republic	25–23	21–25	11–25	23–25		80–98	P2 P3
22 Aug	15:00	Chinese Taipei	3–1	Czech Republic	25–15	21–25	25–17	25–19		96–76	P2 P3
22 Aug	15:00	France	3–0	Colombia	25–11	25–19	25–20			75–50	P2 P3
23 Aug	18:00	Colombia	0–3	Chinese Taipei	15–25	16–25	14–25			45–75	P2 P3
23 Aug	18:00	Czech Republic	0–3	France	14–25	10–25	23–25			47–75	P2 P3

==== Group B ====
Pos	Team	Pld	W	L	Pts	SW	SL	SR	SPW	SPL	SPR	Qualification
1	Ukraine	3	3	0	9	9	2	4.500	267	216	1.236	Quarterfinals
2	Argentina	3	2	1	5	6	6	1.000	246	243	1.012	Quarterfinals
3	Switzerland	3	1	2	4	6	7	0.857	274	270	1.015	
4	Canada	3	0	3	0	3	9	0.333	236	294	0.803	

Date	Time		Score		Set 1	Set 2	Set 3	Set 4	Set 5	Total	Report
21 Aug	13:00	Argentina	0–3	Ukraine	13–25	20–25	10–25			43–75	P2 P3
21 Aug	13:00	Switzerland	3–1	Canada	22–25	25–15	25–20	25–12		97–72	P2 P3
22 Aug	13:00	Ukraine	3–1	Canada	25–19	25–18	22–25	25–20		97–82	P2 P3
22 Aug	13:00	Argentina	3–2	Switzerland	14–25	25–9	25–18	24–26	15–8	103–86	P2 P3
23 Aug	13:00	Canada	1–3	Argentina	22–25	27–25	16–25	17–25		82–100	P2 P3
23 Aug	15:00	Switzerland	1–3	Ukraine	25–18	25–27	18–25	23–25		91–95	P2 P3

==== Group C ====
Pos	Team	Pld	W	L	Pts	SW	SL	SR	SPW	SPL	SPR	Qualification
1	Japan	3	3	0	9	9	0	MAX	225	143	1.573	Quarterfinals
2	Thailand	3	2	1	5	6	5	1.200	240	226	1.062	Quarterfinals
3	United States	3	1	2	4	5	6	0.833	230	225	1.022	
4	Latvia	3	0	3	0	0	9	0.000	124	225	0.551	

Date	Time		Score		Set 1	Set 2	Set 3	Set 4	Set 5	Total	Report
21 Aug	13:00	Thailand	3–0	Latvia	25–17	25–13	25–12			75–42	P2 P3
21 Aug	15:00	Japan	3–0	United States	25–22	25–8	25–16			75–46	P2 P3
22 Aug	13:00	Japan	3–0	Thailand	25–16	25–18	25–23			75–57	P2 P3
22 Aug	15:00	United States	3–0	Latvia	25–14	25–22	25–6			75–42	P2 P3
23 Aug	15:00	Thailand	3–2	United States	25–23	25–23	26–28	17–25	15–10	108–109	P2 P3
23 Aug	15:00	Latvia	0–3	Japan	14–25	10–25	16–25			40–75	P2 P3

==== Group D ====
Pos	Team	Pld	W	L	Pts	SW	SL	SR	SPW	SPL	SPR	Qualification
1	Russia	3	3	0	9	9	1	9.000	246	180	1.367	Quarterfinals
2	Finland	3	2	1	6	6	3	2.000	204	182	1.121	Quarterfinals
3	Brazil	3	1	2	3	4	6	0.667	213	219	0.973	
4	Mexico	3	0	3	0	0	9	0.000	143	225	0.636	

Date	Time		Score		Set 1	Set 2	Set 3	Set 4	Set 5	Total	Report
21 Aug	18:00	Brazil	0–3	Finland	21–25	19–25	16–25			56–75	P2 P3
21 Aug	18:00	Mexico	0–3	Russia	20–25	9–25	15–25			44–75	P2 P3
22 Aug	18:00	Brazil	3–0	Mexico	25–21	25–11	25–16			75–48	P2 P3
22 Aug	20:00	Finland	0–3	Russia	19–25	14–25	21–25			54–75	P2 P3
23 Aug	18:00	Mexico	0–3	Finland	18–25	19–25	14–25			51–75	P2 P3
23 Aug	20:00	Russia	3–1	Brazil	21–25	25–15	25–21	25–21		96–82	P2 P3

== Final round ==
=== 9th–16th places ===
13th place
Canada	3
Latvia	0
15th place
Mexico	3
Colombia	1

13th–16th place semifinals
Canada	3
Mexico	0
Latvia	3
Colombia	0

9th–16th place quarterfinals
Czech Republic	3
Canada	1
Mexico	2
United States	3
Brazil	3
Latvia	0
Colombia	0
Switzerland	3

9th–12th place semifinals
Czech Republic	2
United States	3
Brazil	3
Switzerland	0

9th place
United States	1
Brazil	3
11th place
Czech Republic	0
Switzerland	3

==== 9th–16th place quarterfinals ====
Date	Time		Score		Set 1	Set 2	Set 3	Set 4	Set 5	Total	Report
25 Aug	13:00	Brazil	3–0	Latvia	25–12	25–17	25–23			75–52	P2 P3
25 Aug	15:00	Colombia	0–3	Switzerland	10–25	11–25	14–25			35–75	P2 P3
25 Aug	18:00	Czech Republic	3–1	Canada	25–20	14–25	25–12	25–17		89–74	P2 P3
25 Aug	20:00	Mexico	2–3	United States	25–20	20–25	10–25	25–21	12–15	92–106	P2 P3

==== 13th–16th place semifinals ====
Date	Time		Score		Set 1	Set 2	Set 3	Set 4	Set 5	Total	Report
26 Aug	15:00	Latvia	3–0	Colombia	25–22	25–22	25–15			75–59	P2 P3
26 Aug	18:00	Canada	3–0	Mexico	25–15	25–22	25–17			75–54	P2 P3

==== 9th–12th place semifinals ====
Date	Time		Score		Set 1	Set 2	Set 3	Set 4	Set 5	Total	Report
26 Aug	15:00	Brazil	3–0	Switzerland	29–27	25–11	25–14			79–52	P2 P3
26 Aug	18:00	Czech Republic	2–3	United States	25–20	25–19	24–26	11–25	11–15	96–105	P2 P3

==== 15th place match ====
Date	Time		Score		Set 1	Set 2	Set 3	Set 4	Set 5	Total	Report
27 Aug	13:00	Mexico	3–1	Colombia	18–25	25–11	25–23	25–16		93–75	P2 P3

==== 13th place match ====
Date	Time		Score		Set 1	Set 2	Set 3	Set 4	Set 5	Total	Report
27 Aug	15:00	Canada	3–0	Latvia	25–14	25–15	25–10			75–39	P2 P3

==== 11th place match ====
Date	Time		Score		Set 1	Set 2	Set 3	Set 4	Set 5	Total	Report
27 Aug	18:00	Czech Republic	0–3	Switzerland	19–25	19–25	10–25			48–75	P2 P3

==== 9th place match ====
Date	Time		Score		Set 1	Set 2	Set 3	Set 4	Set 5	Total	Report
27 Aug	20:00	United States	1–3	Brazil	25–23	22–25	14–25	16–25		77–98	P2 P3

=== Final eight ===
5th place
Finland	3
Thailand	1
7th place
Argentina	2
France	3

5th–8th place semifinals
Argentina	0
Finland	3
Thailand	3
France	1

Quarterfinals
Chinese Taipei	3
Argentina	0
Finland	1
Japan	3
Russia	3
Thailand	0
France	2
Ukraine	3

Semifinals
Chinese Taipei	1
Japan	3
Russia	3
Ukraine	0

Final
Japan	1
Russia	3
Third place
Chinese Taipei	1
Ukraine	3

==== Quarterfinals ====
Date	Time		Score		Set 1	Set 2	Set 3	Set 4	Set 5	Total	Report
25 Aug	13:00	Russia	3–0	Thailand	25–17	25–27	25–12			75–56	P2 P3
25 Aug	15:00	France	2–3	Ukraine	25–23	22–25	25–20	19–25	12–15	103–108	P2 P3
25 Aug	18:00	Finland	1–3	Japan	25–22	19–25	13–25	22–25		79–97	P2 P3
25 Aug	20:00	Chinese Taipei	3–0	Argentina	25–13	25–15	25–22			75–50	P2 P3

==== 5th–8th place semifinals ====
Date	Time		Score		Set 1	Set 2	Set 3	Set 4	Set 5	Total	Report
26 Aug	13:00	Thailand	3–1	France	25–20	25–21	18–25	25–19		93–85	P2 P3
26 Aug	15:00	Argentina	0–3	Finland	20–25	15–25	21–25			56–75	P2 P3

==== Semifinals ====
Date	Time		Score		Set 1	Set 2	Set 3	Set 4	Set 5	Total	Report
26 Aug	18:00	Russia	3–0	Ukraine	25–21	25–18	25–21			75–60	P2 P3
26 Aug	20:00	Chinese Taipei	1–3	Japan	27–25	19–25	15–25	17–25		78–100	P2 P3

==== 7th place match ====
Date	Time		Score		Set 1	Set 2	Set 3	Set 4	Set 5	Total	Report
27 Aug	15:00	Argentina	2–3	France	25–19	22–25	25–20	18–25	13–15	103–104	P2 P3

==== 5th place match ====
Date	Time		Score		Set 1	Set 2	Set 3	Set 4	Set 5	Total	Report
27 Aug	18:00	Finland	3–1	Thailand	24–26	25–9	25–18	25–14		99–67	P2 P3

==== Third place match ====
Date	Time		Score		Set 1	Set 2	Set 3	Set 4	Set 5	Total	Report
28 Aug	17:30	Chinese Taipei	1–3	Ukraine	25–14	13–25	14–25	21–25		73–89	P2 P3

==== Final ====
Date	Time		Score		Set 1	Set 2	Set 3	Set 4	Set 5	Total	Report
28 Aug	20:00	Japan	1–3	Russia	18–25	25–17	22–25	22–25		87–92	P2 P3

== Final standing ==
Rank	Team
1st place, gold medalist(s)	Russia
2nd place, silver medalist(s)	Japan
3rd place, bronze medalist(s)	Ukraine
4	Chinese Taipei
5	Finland
6	Thailand
7	France
8	Argentina
9	Brazil
10	United States
11	Switzerland
12	Czech Republic
13	Canada
14	Latvia
15	Mexico
16	Colombia
