= Naoto Hayasaka =

Japanese artistic gymnast

- Full name: 早坂 尚人
- Born: 4 December 1995 (age 30) Saitama, Japan
- Height: 1.65 m (5 ft 5 in)

Gymnastics career
- Discipline: Men's artistic gymnastics
- Country represented: Japan
- College team: Juntendo University
- Club: Central Sports
- Head coach: Yoshihiro Saito
Medal record
Representing Japan
World Championships
Gold medal – first place	2015 Glasgow	Team
Summer Universiade
Gold medal – first place	2015 Gwangju	Team
Gold medal – first place	2015 Gwangju	Floor Exercise
Silver medal – second place	2015 Gwangju	Pommel Horse
Asian Championships
Gold medal – first place	2015 Hiroshima	Team
Silver medal – second place	2015 Hiroshima	Floor
FIG World Cup
Gold medal – first place	2017 Baku	Horizontal Bar
Gold medal – first place	2016 Cottbus	Floor Exercise
Silver medal – second place	2016 Cottbus	Pommel Horse
Bronze medal – third place	2017 Baku	Floor Exercise
Bronze medal – third place	2016 Cottbus	Parallel Bars

Naoto Hayasaka (早坂 尚人, Hayasaka Naoto; born 4 December 1995) is a Japanese artistic gymnast. Born in Saitama, Japan, he graduated from Juntendo University and later join Central Sports. Takeda was part of Japan men's national gymnastics team that won the gold medal at 2015 World Championships.

== See also ==
- Japan men's national gymnastics team
- World Artistic Gymnastics Championships – Men's team all-around
