= Volleyball at the 2015 Summer Universiade – Women's tournament =

The 2015 Women's Summer Universiade Volleyball Tournament was the 16th edition of the event, organized by the Summer Universiade. It was held in Gwangju, South Korea from 2–12 July 2015.

== Results ==
All times are Korea Standard Time (UTC+09:00)

=== Preliminary round ===
==== Group A ====
Pos	Team	Pld	W	L	Pts	SW	SL	SR	SPW	SPL	SPR	Qualification
1	China	3	3	0	9	9	1	9.000	248	193	1.285	Quarterfinals
2	Colombia	3	2	1	6	6	5	1.200	256	231	1.108	Quarterfinals
3	Chile	3	1	2	3	4	6	0.667	210	213	0.986	
4	South Korea	3	0	3	0	2	9	0.222	189	266	0.711	

Date	Time		Score		Set 1	Set 2	Set 3	Set 4	Set 5	Total	Report
2 Jul	13:00	Colombia	3–1	Chile	25–23	24–26	25–14	25–22		99–85	Report
2 Jul	15:40	China	3–1	South Korea	25–21	25–20	20–25	25–16		95–82	Report
5 Jul	15:00	Colombia	0–3	China	26–28	14–25	21–25			61–78	Report
5 Jul	15:30	Chile	3–0	South Korea	25–11	25–8	25–20			75–39	Report
6 Jul	15:05	South Korea	1–3	Colombia	21–25	13–25	25–21	9–25		68–96	Report
6 Jul	18:00	China	3–0	Chile	25–19	25–16	25–15			75–50	Report

==== Group B ====
Pos	Team	Pld	W	L	Pts	SW	SL	SR	SPW	SPL	SPR	Qualification
1	Russia	3	3	0	9	9	1	9.000	244	168	1.452	Quarterfinals
2	Ukraine	3	2	1	6	7	4	1.750	241	247	0.976	Quarterfinals
3	Chinese Taipei	3	1	2	3	4	7	0.571	245	258	0.950	
4	Switzerland	3	0	3	0	1	9	0.111	191	248	0.770	

Date	Time		Score		Set 1	Set 2	Set 3	Set 4	Set 5	Total	Report
2 Jul	18:00	Switzerland	0–3	Ukraine	18–25	16–25	23–25			57–75	Report
2 Jul	20:00	Chinese Taipei	0–3	Russia	19–25	16–25	16–25			51–75	Report
5 Jul	15:00	Chinese Taipei	3–1	Switzerland	25–21	23–25	25–19	25–21		98–86	Report
5 Jul	20:00	Russia	3–1	Ukraine	19–25	25–14	25–14	25–16		94–69	Report
6 Jul	15:00	Ukraine	3–1	Chinese Taipei	25–23	19–25	25–22	28–26		97–96	Report
6 Jul	20:22	Switzerland	0–3	Russia	20–25	15–25	13–25			48–75	Report

==== Group C ====
Pos	Team	Pld	W	L	Pts	SW	SL	SR	SPW	SPL	SPR	Qualification
1	Japan	3	3	0	8	9	3	3.000	283	257	1.101	Quarterfinals
2	Brazil	3	2	1	7	8	4	2.000	282	235	1.200	Quarterfinals
3	Finland	3	1	2	3	4	7	0.571	236	263	0.897	
4	United States	3	0	3	0	2	9	0.222	221	267	0.828	

Date	Time		Score		Set 1	Set 2	Set 3	Set 4	Set 5	Total	Report
4 Jul	13:00	Finland	1–3	Brazil	17–25	25–21	20–25	16–25		78–96	Report
4 Jul	15:00	Japan	3–1	United States	18–25	25–18	25–23	25–21		93–87	Report
5 Jul	13:00	United States	1–3	Finland	22–25	26–24	22–25	20–25		90–99	Report
5 Jul	18:00	Japan	3–2	Brazil	25–23	23–25	27–25	23–25	15–13	113–111	Report
6 Jul	13:00	Finland	0–3	Japan	20–25	14–25	25–27			59–77	Report
6 Jul	13:15	Brazil	3–0	United States	25–13	25–19	25–12			75–44	Report

==== Group D ====
Pos	Team	Pld	W	L	Pts	SW	SL	SR	SPW	SPL	SPR	Qualification
1	Thailand	3	2	1	7	8	4	2.000	269	226	1.190	Quarterfinals
2	Canada	3	2	1	6	8	5	1.600	280	231	1.212	Quarterfinals
3	Turkey	3	2	1	5	7	5	1.400	275	214	1.285	
4	Zimbabwe	3	0	3	0	0	9	0.000	72	225	0.320	

Date	Time		Score		Set 1	Set 2	Set 3	Set 4	Set 5	Total	Report
4 Jul	18:00	Thailand	3–0	Zimbabwe	25–14	25–14	25–3			75–31	Report
4 Jul	20:00	Canada	2–3	Turkey	19–25	25–23	16–25	25–22	14–16	99–111	Report
5 Jul	18:00	Turkey	1–3	Thailand	22–25	25–22	23–25	19–25		89–97	Report
5 Jul	18:00	Canada	3–0	Zimbabwe	25–10	25–7	25–6			75–23	Report
6 Jul	18:00	Zimbabwe	0–3	Turkey	5–25	8–25	5–25			18–75	Report
6 Jul	20:00	Thailand	2–3	Canada	25–19	14–25	25–27	25–20	8–15	97–106	Report

== Final round ==
=== 9th–16th places ===
9th–16th quarterfinals
8 July
Chile	0
United States	3
8 July
Turkey	2
Switzerland	3
8 July
Finland	3
South Korea	0
8 July
Chinese Taipei	3
Zimbabwe	0

9th–12th semifinals
9 July
United States	3
Switzerland	1
9 July
Finland	3
Chinese Taipei	0

9th place match
10 July
United States	3
Finland	2
11th place match
10 July
Switzerland	3
Chinese Taipei	0

13th–16th semifinals
9 July
Chile	1
Turkey	3
9 July
South Korea	3
Zimbabwe	0

13th place match
10 July
Turkey	3
South Korea	0
15th place match
10 July
Chile	3
Zimbabwe	0

==== 9th–16th quarterfinals ====
Date	Time		Score		Set 1	Set 2	Set 3	Set 4	Set 5	Total	Report
8 Jul	15:00	Chile	0–3	United States	23–25	23–25	11–25			57–75	Report
8 Jul	15:00	Turkey	2–3	Switzerland	21–25	25–16	25–16	23–25	12–15	106–97	Report
8 Jul	18:00	Finland	3–0	South Korea	25–17	25–16	25–11			75–44	Report
8 Jul	18:00	Chinese Taipei	3–0	Zimbabwe	25–10	25–7	25–5			75–22	Report

==== 13th–16th semifinals ====
Date	Time		Score		Set 1	Set 2	Set 3	Set 4	Set 5	Total	Report
9 Jul	13:00	Chile	1–3	Turkey	10–25	26–24	17–25	13–25		66–99	Report
9 Jul	15:15	South Korea	3–0	Zimbabwe	25–6	25–5	25–5			75–16	Report

==== 9th–12th semifinals ====
Date	Time		Score		Set 1	Set 2	Set 3	Set 4	Set 5	Total	Report
9 Jul	18:00	United States	3–1	Switzerland	20–25	25–21	25–21	–		70–67	Report
9 Jul	20:00	Finland	3–0	Chinese Taipei	25–19	25–15	25–13			75–47	Report

==== 15th place match ====
Date	Time		Score		Set 1	Set 2	Set 3	Set 4	Set 5	Total	Report
10 Jul	13:00	Chile	3–0	Zimbabwe	25–10	25–8	25–7			75–25	Report

==== 13th place match ====
Date	Time		Score		Set 1	Set 2	Set 3	Set 4	Set 5	Total	Report
10 Jul	15:00	Turkey	3–0	South Korea	25–5	25–23	25–17			75–45	Report

==== 11th place match ====
Date	Time		Score		Set 1	Set 2	Set 3	Set 4	Set 5	Total	Report
10 Jul	18:00	Switzerland	3–0	Chinese Taipei	25–20	25–19	25–21			75–60	Report

==== 9th place match ====
Date	Time		Score		Set 1	Set 2	Set 3	Set 4	Set 5	Total	Report
10 Jul	20:00	United States	3–2	Finland	25–22	21–25	21–25	25–19	15–4	107–95	Report

=== Final eight ===
Quarterfinals
8 July
China	0
Brazil	3
8 July
Thailand	1
Ukraine	3
8 July
Japan	3
Colombia	0
8 July
Russia	3
Canada	0

Semifinals
9 July
Brazil	1
Ukraine	3
9 July
Japan	0
Russia	3

Final
11 July
Ukraine	0
Russia	3
3rd place match
11 July
Brazil	1
Japan	3

5th–8th semifinals
9 July
China	3
Thailand	1
9 July
Colombia	0
Canada	3

5th place match
10 July
China	3
Canada	2
7th place match
10 July
Thailand	3
Colombia	0

==== Quarterfinals ====
Date	Time		Score		Set 1	Set 2	Set 3	Set 4	Set 5	Total	Report
8 Jul	13:00	China	0–3	Brazil	11–25	15–25	16–25			42–75	Report
8 Jul	15:00	Thailand	1–3	Ukraine	19–25	21–25	25–21	23–25		88–96	Report
8 Jul	18:00	Japan	3–0	Colombia	25–15	25–17	25–21			75–53	Report
8 Jul	20:00	Russia	3–0	Canada	25–20	25–17	25–19			75–56	Report

==== 5th–8th semifinals ====
Date	Time		Score		Set 1	Set 2	Set 3	Set 4	Set 5	Total	Report
9 Jul	18:00	China	3–1	Thailand	24–26	25–15	25–22	25–23		99–86	Report
9 Jul	20:30	Colombia	0–3	Canada	23–25	7–25	18–25			48–75	Report

==== Semifinals ====
Date	Time		Score		Set 1	Set 2	Set 3	Set 4	Set 5	Total	Report
9 Jul	15:50	Brazil	1–3	Ukraine	21–25	25–20	24–26	23–25		93–96	Report
9 Jul	20:30	Japan	0–3	Russia	19–25	14–25	16–25			49–75	Report

==== 7th place match ====
Date	Time		Score		Set 1	Set 2	Set 3	Set 4	Set 5	Total	Report
10 Jul	13:00	Thailand	3–0	Colombia	25–20	25–22	25–14			75–56	Report

==== 5th place match ====
Date	Time		Score		Set 1	Set 2	Set 3	Set 4	Set 5	Total	Report
10 Jul	15:00	China	3–2	Canada	27–25	24–26	18–25	25–23	15–11	109–110	Report

==== 3rd place match ====
Date	Time		Score		Set 1	Set 2	Set 3	Set 4	Set 5	Total	Report
11 Jul	16:00	Brazil	1–3	Japan	17–25	27–25	23–25	18–25		85–100	Report

==== Final ====
Date	Time		Score		Set 1	Set 2	Set 3	Set 4	Set 5	Total	Report
11 Jul	20:00	Ukraine	0–3	Russia	12–25	17–25	17–25			46–75	Report

== Final standing ==
Rank	Team
1st place, gold medalist(s)	Russia
2nd place, silver medalist(s)	Ukraine
3rd place, bronze medalist(s)	Japan
4	Brazil
5	China
6	Canada
7	Thailand
8	Colombia
9	United States
10	Finland
11	Switzerland
12	Chinese Taipei
13	Turkey
14	South Korea
15	Chile
16	Zimbabwe
