= Shooting at the 2010 Asian Games – Women's 10 metre air rifle =

Women's 10 metre air rifle at the 2010 Asian Games
- Venue: Aoti Shooting Range
- Dates: 13 November 2010
- Competitors: 56 from 22 nations

Medalists
gold medal	Yi Siling	China
silver medal	Wu Liuxi	China
bronze medal	Nur Suryani Taibi	Malaysia

The women's 10 metre air rifle competition at the 2010 Asian Games in Guangzhou, China was held on 13 November at the Aoti Shooting Range.

== Schedule ==
All times are China Standard Time (UTC+08:00)

Date	Time	Event
Saturday, 13 November 2010	09:00	Qualification
Saturday, 13 November 2010	11:30	Final

== Records ==
Prior to this competition, the existing world, Asian and Games records were as follows.

Qualification
World Record	Seo Sun-hwa (KOR)	400	Sydney, Australia	12 April 2002
Asian Record	Seo Sun-hwa (KOR)	400	Sydney, Australia	12 April 2002
Games Record	Zhao Yinghui (CHN); Park Un-kyong (KOR)	399	Busan, South Korea	2 October 2002
Final
World Record	Yi Siling (CHN)	505.6	Munich, Germany	1 August 2010
Asian Record	Yi Siling (CHN)	505.6	Munich, Germany	1 August 2010
Games Record	Zhao Yinghui (CHN)	501.4	Busan, South Korea	2 October 2002

== Results ==
Legend

- DNS — Did not start

=== Qualification ===
Rank	Athlete	Series				Total	Xs	S-off	Notes
Rank	Athlete	1	2	3	4	Total	Xs	S-off	Notes
1	Yi Siling (CHN)	100	100	100	99	399	38		
2	Wu Liuxi (CHN)	100	100	98	100	398	37		
3	Mahlagha Jambozorg (IRI)	100	99	100	99	398	35		
4	Elaheh Ahmadi (IRI)	98	100	99	100	397	35		
5	Yu Dan (CHN)	98	99	100	100	397	33		
6	Nur Suryani Taibi (MAS)	100	98	100	99	397	32		
7	Narjes Emamgholinejad (IRI)	100	100	99	98	397	31		
8	Kim Sun-hwa (KOR)	99	100	100	98	397	30		
9	Jasmine Ser (SIN)	99	99	99	99	396	34		
10	Suma Shirur (IND)	98	99	100	99	396	33		
11	Yana Fatkhi (UZB)	98	100	100	98	396	27		
12	Sakina Mamedova (UZB)	99	100	99	98	396	27		
13	Maki Konomoto (JPN)	99	99	99	98	395	30		
14	Hessah Al-Zayed (IOC)	98	97	99	100	394	30		
15	Roh Bo-mi (KOR)	99	100	98	97	394	28		
16	Olzvoibaataryn Yanjinlkham (MGL)	99	99	100	96	394	27		
17	Aishah Qasem (IOC)	100	98	99	96	393	31		
18	Supaluk Pongsinwijit (THA)	95	100	98	100	393	25		
19	Chuluunbadrakhyn Narantuyaa (MGL)	98	99	97	98	392	29		
20	Sabina Ismailova (KGZ)	98	96	99	99	392	28		
21	Thanyalak Chotphibunsin (THA)	97	97	100	98	392	26		
22	Sharmin Akhter (BAN)	97	97	99	99	392	25		
23	Bahiya Al-Hamad (QAT)	98	98	98	98	392	25		
24	Mahbubeh Akhlaghi (QAT)	99	98	98	97	392	24		
25	Seiko Iwata (JPN)	96	97	98	100	391	27		
26	Yuka Nakamura (JPN)	97	100	96	98	391	22		
27	Sabika Mubarak Juma (BRN)	97	98	96	99	390	27		
28	Kavita Yadav (IND)	96	98	98	98	390	27		
29	Olga Dovgun (KAZ)	95	100	99	96	390	27		
30	Sununta Majchacheep (THA)	96	99	97	98	390	26		
31	Elena Kuznetsova (UZB)	97	98	98	97	390	25		
32	Maryam Arzouqi (IOC)	97	99	98	96	390	24		
33	Tejaswini Sawant (IND)	99	98	98	95	390	24		
34	Urooj Fatima (PAK)	98	96	98	98	390	23		
35	Sharmin Ratna (BAN)	97	97	99	97	390	23		
36	Shahera Rahim Raja (MAS)	97	100	98	95	390	21		
37	Olessya Snegirevich (KAZ)	97	96	98	98	389	23		
38	Kwon Na-ra (KOR)	97	98	96	98	389	22		
39	Tripti Datta (BAN)	96	96	99	97	388	27		
40	Gankhuyagiin Nandinzayaa (MGL)	95	97	99	97	388	24		
41	Asma Al-Nuaimi (UAE)	95	97	98	98	388	22		
42	Cheng Jian Huan (SIN)	96	96	97	98	387	22		
42	Alexandra Malinovskaya (KAZ)	96	96	97	98	387	22		
44	Shamsa Al-Marzouqi (UAE)	95	98	100	94	387	22		
45	Goh Jia Yi (SIN)	96	97	97	96	386	20		
46	Sneh Rana (NEP)	95	96	98	96	385	18		
47	Nazish Khan (PAK)	95	100	95	94	384	14		
48	Asmita Rai (NEP)	96	96	96	95	383	18		
49	Lương Thị Bạch Dương (VIE)	95	96	95	97	383	13		
50	Raya Zeineddine (SYR)	95	92	98	97	382	19		
51	Aisuluu Kurmanbek Kyzy (KGZ)	95	97	94	95	381	16		
52	Nur Ayuni Farhana (MAS)	98	85	98	98	379	18		
53	Shaikha Al-Mohammed (QAT)	98	95	95	91	379	13		
54	Juhi Chaudhary (NEP)	97	96	92	93	378	15		
—	Ýeketerina Arabowa (TKM)					DNS			
—	Nguyễn Thị Lệ Quyên (VIE)					DNS			

=== Final ===
Rank	Athlete	Qual.	Final											Total	S-off	Notes
Rank	Athlete	Qual.	1	2	3	4	5	6	7	8	9	10	Total	Total	S-off	Notes
1st place, gold medalist(s)	Yi Siling (CHN)	399	10.6	10.5	10.6	10.4	10.8	10.8	10.7	10.7	10.8	10.0	105.9	504.9		GR
2nd place, silver medalist(s)	Wu Liuxi (CHN)	398	10.2	10.7	10.6	9.9	10.9	10.5	10.2	10.7	10.6	10.5	104.8	502.8		
3rd place, bronze medalist(s)	Nur Suryani Taibi (MAS)	397	10.2	10.1	10.7	10.6	10.4	10.6	10.1	10.6	10.8	10.7	104.8	501.8		
4	Yu Dan (CHN)	397	10.8	10.8	10.2	9.8	10.5	10.9	10.3	10.1	9.6	10.8	103.8	500.8		
5	Mahlagha Jambozorg (IRI)	398	10.2	10.6	10.3	9.8	10.5	10.7	9.5	9.9	10.3	10.9	102.7	500.7		
6	Kim Sun-hwa (KOR)	397	10.6	10.3	10.1	10.3	10.6	10.3	9.6	10.4	10.8	10.0	103.0	500.0		
7	Elaheh Ahmadi (IRI)	397	9.9	9.6	9.7	10.0	10.0	10.6	10.3	10.6	10.5	10.9	102.1	499.1		
8	Narjes Emamgholinejad (IRI)	397	10.7	10.8	9.4	10.0	10.1	10.8	9.1	9.2	10.4	10.1	100.6	497.6		
