= Shooting at the 2014 Asian Games – Women's 50 metre rifle prone =

Women's 50 metre rifle prone at the 2014 Asian Games
- Venue: Ongnyeon International Shooting Range
- Dates: 24 September 2014
- Competitors: 44 from 17 nations

Medalists
gold medal	Chuluunbadrakhyn Narantuyaa	Mongolia
silver medal	Nur Suryani Taibi	Malaysia
bronze medal	Eum Bit-na	South Korea

The women's 50 metre rifle prone competition at the 2014 Asian Games in Incheon, South Korea was held on 24 September at the Ongnyeon International Shooting Range.

== Schedule ==
All times are Korea Standard Time (UTC+09:00)

Date	Time	Event
Wednesday, 24 September 2014	09:00	Final

== Records ==
Prior to this competition, the existing world, Asian and Games records were as follows.

World Record	Beate Gauß (GER)	628.5	Granada, Spain	14 September 2014
Asian Record	Chen Dongqi (CHN)	626.4	Granada, Spain	14 September 2014
Games Record	—	—	—	—

== Results ==
Legend

- DNS — Did not start

Rank	Athlete	Series						Total	Notes
Rank	Athlete	1	2	3	4	5	6	Total	Notes
1st place, gold medalist(s)	Chuluunbadrakhyn Narantuyaa (MGL)	104.9	104.5	103.6	102.5	104.4	104.2	624.1	GR
2nd place, silver medalist(s)	Nur Suryani Taibi (MAS)	103.2	104.1	102.1	103.3	104.4	103.5	620.6	
3rd place, bronze medalist(s)	Eum Bit-na (KOR)	103.4	102.0	103.3	104.3	105.0	102.6	620.6	
4	Mahlagha Jambozorg (IRI)	102.5	102.9	104.0	104.4	103.2	103.2	620.2	
5	Chen Dongqi (CHN)	103.3	103.7	101.8	103.5	103.4	103.9	619.6	
6	Nguyễn Thị Xuân (VIE)	103.3	102.4	104.3	103.1	102.7	103.6	619.4	
7	Li Yafei (SIN)	102.9	102.2	103.8	104.0	104.4	101.9	619.2	
8	Olga Dovgun (KAZ)	103.7	103.1	103.1	102.7	104.2	102.3	619.1	
9	Jeong Mi-ra (KOR)	102.2	103.1	103.3	104.0	103.4	102.5	618.5	
10	Muslifah Zulkifli (MAS)	103.3	101.6	103.8	102.7	103.8	103.1	618.3	
11	Sununta Majchacheep (THA)	101.3	103.8	104.1	102.8	104.0	102.3	618.3	
12	Thu Thu Kyaw (MYA)	102.1	103.2	105.4	101.3	102.7	103.5	618.2	
13	Chang Jing (CHN)	101.7	103.7	104.2	104.8	101.7	101.9	618.0	
14	Jasmine Ser (SIN)	103.2	103.4	101.2	103.0	103.7	103.4	617.9	
15	Yelizaveta Lunina (KAZ)	103.0	103.4	103.4	99.9	103.7	103.2	616.6	
16	Yi Siling (CHN)	101.8	99.9	104.3	102.6	103.0	104.9	616.5	
17	Na Yoon-kyung (KOR)	104.1	100.5	103.1	102.8	102.7	103.2	616.4	
18	Supamas Wankaew (THA)	103.2	103.4	101.9	103.5	101.7	102.7	616.4	
19	Yuka Isobe (JPN)	102.5	102.4	105.6	102.0	103.3	100.3	616.1	
20	Thanyalak Chotphibunsin (THA)	102.0	104.0	102.0	102.8	101.4	102.6	614.8	
21	Nur Ayuni Farhana (MAS)	103.8	103.8	102.4	101.1	102.0	101.6	614.7	
22	Raj Chaudhary (IND)	104.4	101.6	102.4	103.4	100.4	102.4	614.6	
23	Sakina Mamedova (UZB)	101.1	103.5	101.7	102.2	103.7	102.3	614.5	
24	Margarita Orlova (UZB)	101.1	103.0	101.9	102.8	101.9	103.0	613.7	
25	Lajja Goswami (IND)	100.2	103.0	104.2	102.5	102.3	101.5	613.7	
26	Mariya Filimonova (UZB)	101.8	100.7	105.1	102.1	101.2	101.6	612.5	
27	Seiko Iwata (JPN)	102.3	102.0	102.6	102.5	100.5	102.3	612.2	
28	Gankhuyagiin Nandinzayaa (MGL)	102.1	100.0	102.3	103.7	102.1	101.5	611.7	
29	Matara Al-Aseiri (QAT)	100.4	100.7	103.9	100.5	102.5	102.9	610.9	
30	Sabina Krupnova (KGZ)	103.0	101.1	103.2	101.5	100.0	101.7	610.5	
31	Dina Farzadkhah (IRI)	102.0	101.4	101.7	101.8	102.4	101.2	610.5	
32	Maki Matsumoto (JPN)	102.5	103.6	102.6	100.1	100.9	100.6	610.3	
33	Aisha Al-Mutawa (QAT)	102.0	101.2	101.8	101.9	102.3	101.0	610.2	
34	Elaheh Ahmadi (IRI)	97.9	102.6	102.0	100.6	104.6	102.1	609.8	
35	Roselin Pay Moe (MYA)	102.6	99.8	101.2	101.9	102.2	101.1	608.8	
36	Tejaswini Muley (IND)	102.8	99.3	103.6	101.3	103.1	98.7	608.8	
37	Maryam Arzouqi (KUW)	100.9	101.4	98.7	101.6	102.6	103.4	608.6	
38	Alexandra Malinovskaya (KAZ)	103.8	100.4	100.5	99.0	102.4	101.7	607.8	
39	Olzvoibaataryn Yanjinlkham (MGL)	100.6	101.7	99.6	101.7	103.0	101.2	607.8	
40	Nguyễn Thị Hằng (VIE)	99.6	102.2	100.8	100.7	100.9	102.8	607.0	
41	Bahiya Al-Hamad (QAT)	102.2	100.5	99.1	100.8	101.4	102.1	606.1	
42	Aye Aye Thin (MYA)	100.8	98.5	103.8	100.6	99.1	100.3	603.1	
43	Cheng Jian Huan (SIN)	99.3	98.6	102.4	97.8	102.2	101.6	601.9	
—	Azza Al-Qasmi (BRN)							DNS	
