= Shooting at the 2014 Asian Games – Women's 50 metre rifle prone team =

Women's 50 metre rifle prone team at the 2014 Asian Games
- Venue: Ongnyeon International Shooting Range
- Dates: 24 September 2014
- Competitors: 39 from 13 nations

Medalists
gold medal	South Korea; Eum Bit-na, Jeong Mi-ra, Na Yoon-kyung
silver medal	China; Chang Jing, Chen Dongqi, Yi Siling
bronze medal	Malaysia; Nur Ayuni Farhana, Nur Suryani Taibi, Muslifah Zulkifli

The women's 50 metre rifle prone team competition at the 2014 Asian Games in Incheon, South Korea was held on 24 September at the Ongnyeon International Shooting Range.

== Schedule ==
All times are Korea Standard Time (UTC+09:00)

Date	Time	Event
Wednesday, 24 September 2014	09:00	Final

== Records ==
Prior to this competition, the existing world, Asian and Games records were as follows.

World Record	Germany	1869.6	Granada, Spain	14 September 2014
Asian Record	China	1867.9	Granada, Spain	14 September 2014
Games Record	—	—	—	—

== Results ==
Rank	Team	Series						Total	Notes
Rank	Team	1	2	3	4	5	6	Total	Notes
1st place, gold medalist(s)	South Korea (KOR)	309.7	305.6	309.7	311.1	311.1	308.3	1855.5	GR
	Eum Bit-na	103.4	102.0	103.3	104.3	105.0	102.6	620.6	
	Jeong Mi-ra	102.2	103.1	103.3	104.0	103.4	102.5	618.5	
	Na Yoon-kyung	104.1	100.5	103.1	102.8	102.7	103.2	616.4	
2nd place, silver medalist(s)	China (CHN)	306.8	307.3	310.3	310.9	308.1	310.7	1854.1	
	Chang Jing	101.7	103.7	104.2	104.8	101.7	101.9	618.0	
	Chen Dongqi	103.3	103.7	101.8	103.5	103.4	103.9	619.6	
	Yi Siling	101.8	99.9	104.3	102.6	103.0	104.9	616.5	
3rd place, bronze medalist(s)	Malaysia (MAS)	310.3	309.5	308.3	307.1	310.2	308.2	1853.6	
	Nur Ayuni Farhana	103.8	103.8	102.4	101.1	102.0	101.6	614.7	
	Nur Suryani Taibi	103.2	104.1	102.1	103.3	104.4	103.5	620.6	
	Muslifah Zulkifli	103.3	101.6	103.8	102.7	103.8	103.1	618.3	
4	Thailand (THA)	306.5	311.2	308.0	309.1	307.1	307.6	1849.5	
	Thanyalak Chotphibunsin	102.0	104.0	102.0	102.8	101.4	102.6	614.8	
	Sununta Majchacheep	101.3	103.8	104.1	102.8	104.0	102.3	618.3	
	Supamas Wankaew	103.2	103.4	101.9	103.5	101.7	102.7	616.4	
5	Mongolia (MGL)	307.6	306.2	305.5	307.9	309.5	306.9	1843.6	
	Gankhuyagiin Nandinzayaa	102.1	100.0	102.3	103.7	102.1	101.5	611.7	
	Chuluunbadrakhyn Narantuyaa	104.9	104.5	103.6	102.5	104.4	104.2	624.1	
	Olzvoibaataryn Yanjinlkham	100.6	101.7	99.6	101.7	103.0	101.2	607.8	
6	Kazakhstan (KAZ)	310.5	306.9	307.0	301.6	310.3	307.2	1843.5	
	Olga Dovgun	103.7	103.1	103.1	102.7	104.2	102.3	619.1	
	Yelizaveta Lunina	103.0	103.4	103.4	99.9	103.7	103.2	616.6	
	Alexandra Malinovskaya	103.8	100.4	100.5	99.0	102.4	101.7	607.8	
7	Uzbekistan (UZB)	304.0	307.2	308.7	307.1	306.8	306.9	1840.7	
	Mariya Filimonova	101.8	100.7	105.1	102.1	101.2	101.6	612.5	
	Sakina Mamedova	101.1	103.5	101.7	102.2	103.7	102.3	614.5	
	Margarita Orlova	101.1	103.0	101.9	102.8	101.9	103.0	613.7	
8	Iran (IRI)	302.4	306.9	307.7	306.8	310.2	306.5	1840.5	
	Elaheh Ahmadi	97.9	102.6	102.0	100.6	104.6	102.1	609.8	
	Dina Farzadkhah	102.0	101.4	101.7	101.8	102.4	101.2	610.5	
	Mahlagha Jambozorg	102.5	102.9	104.0	104.4	103.2	103.2	620.2	
9	Singapore (SIN)	305.4	304.2	307.4	304.8	310.3	306.9	1839.0	
	Cheng Jian Huan	99.3	98.6	102.4	97.8	102.2	101.6	601.9	
	Li Yafei	102.9	102.2	103.8	104.0	104.4	101.9	619.2	
	Jasmine Ser	103.2	103.4	101.2	103.0	103.7	103.4	617.9	
10	Japan (JPN)	307.3	308.0	310.8	304.6	304.7	303.2	1838.6	
	Yuka Isobe	102.5	102.4	105.6	102.0	103.3	100.3	616.1	
	Seiko Iwata	102.3	102.0	102.6	102.5	100.5	102.3	612.2	
	Maki Matsumoto	102.5	103.6	102.6	100.1	100.9	100.6	610.3	
11	India (IND)	307.4	303.9	310.2	307.2	305.8	302.6	1837.1	
	Raj Chaudhary	104.4	101.6	102.4	103.4	100.4	102.4	614.6	
	Lajja Goswami	100.2	103.0	104.2	102.5	102.3	101.5	613.7	
	Tejaswini Muley	102.8	99.3	103.6	101.3	103.1	98.7	608.8	
12	Myanmar (MYA)	305.5	301.5	310.4	303.8	304.0	304.9	1830.1	
	Aye Aye Thin	100.8	98.5	103.8	100.6	99.1	100.3	603.1	
	Roselin Pay Moe	102.6	99.8	101.2	101.9	102.2	101.1	608.8	
	Thu Thu Kyaw	102.1	103.2	105.4	101.3	102.7	103.5	618.2	
13	Qatar (QAT)	304.6	302.4	304.8	303.2	306.2	306.0	1827.2	
	Matara Al-Aseiri	100.4	100.7	103.9	100.5	102.5	102.9	610.9	
	Bahiya Al-Hamad	102.2	100.5	99.1	100.8	101.4	102.1	606.1	
	Aisha Al-Mutawa	102.0	101.2	101.8	101.9	102.3	101.0	610.2	
