= Shooting at the 2010 Asian Games – Women's 10 metre air rifle team =

Women's 10 metre air rifle team at the 2010 Asian Games
- Venue: Aoti Shooting Range
- Dates: 13 November 2010
- Competitors: 45 from 15 nations

Medalists
gold medal	China; Wu Liuxi, Yi Siling, Yu Dan
silver medal	Iran; Elaheh Ahmadi, Narjes Emamgholinejad, Mahlagha Jambozorg
bronze medal	Uzbekistan; Yana Fatkhi, Elena Kuznetsova, Sakina Mamedova

The women's 10 metre air rifle team competition at the 2010 Asian Games in Guangzhou, China was held on 13 November at the Aoti Shooting Range.

== Schedule ==
All times are China Standard Time (UTC+08:00)

Date	Time	Event
Saturday, 13 November 2010	09:00	Final

== Records ==
Prior to this competition, the existing world, Asian and Games records were as follows.

World Record	China	1196	Kuwait City, Kuwait	6 December 2007
Asian Record	China	1196	Kuwait City, Kuwait	6 December 2007
Games Record	China	1194	Busan, South Korea	2 October 2002

== Results ==
Rank	Team	Series				Total	Xs	Notes
Rank	Team	1	2	3	4	Total	Xs	Notes
1st place, gold medalist(s)	China (CHN)	298	299	298	299	1194	108	
	Wu Liuxi	100	100	98	100	398	37	
	Yi Siling	100	100	100	99	399	38	
	Yu Dan	98	99	100	100	397	33	
2nd place, silver medalist(s)	Iran (IRI)	298	299	298	297	1192	101	
	Elaheh Ahmadi	98	100	99	100	397	35	
	Narjes Emamgholinejad	100	100	99	98	397	31	
	Mahlagha Jambozorg	100	99	100	99	398	35	
3rd place, bronze medalist(s)	Uzbekistan (UZB)	294	298	297	293	1182	79	
	Yana Fatkhi	98	100	100	98	396	27	
	Elena Kuznetsova	97	98	98	97	390	25	
	Sakina Mamedova	99	100	99	98	396	27	
4	South Korea (KOR)	295	298	294	293	1180	80	
	Kim Sun-hwa	99	100	100	98	397	30	
	Kwon Na-ra	97	98	96	98	389	22	
	Roh Bo-mi	99	100	98	97	394	28	
5	Athletes from Kuwait (IOC)	295	294	296	292	1177	85	
	Hessah Al-Zayed	98	97	99	100	394	30	
	Maryam Arzouqi	97	99	98	96	390	24	
	Aishah Qasem	100	98	99	96	393	31	
6	Japan (JPN)	292	296	293	296	1177	79	
	Seiko Iwata	96	97	98	100	391	27	
	Maki Konomoto	99	99	99	98	395	30	
	Yuka Nakamura	97	100	96	98	391	22	
7	India (IND)	293	295	296	292	1176	84	
	Tejaswini Sawant	99	98	98	95	390	24	
	Suma Shirur	98	99	100	99	396	33	
	Kavita Yadav	96	98	98	98	390	27	
8	Thailand (THA)	288	296	295	296	1175	77	
	Thanyalak Chotphibunsin	97	97	100	98	392	26	
	Sununta Majchacheep	96	99	97	98	390	26	
	Supaluk Pongsinwijit	95	100	98	100	393	25	
9	Mongolia (MGL)	292	295	296	291	1174	80	
	Gankhuyagiin Nandinzayaa	95	97	99	97	388	24	
	Chuluunbadrakhyn Narantuyaa	98	99	97	98	392	29	
	Olzvoibaataryn Yanjinlkham	99	99	100	96	394	27	
10	Bangladesh (BAN)	290	290	297	293	1170	75	
	Sharmin Akhter	97	97	99	99	392	25	
	Tripti Datta	96	96	99	97	388	27	
	Sharmin Ratna	97	97	99	97	390	23	
11	Singapore (SIN)	291	292	293	293	1169	76	
	Cheng Jian Huan	96	96	97	98	387	22	
	Goh Jia Yi	96	97	97	96	386	20	
	Jasmine Ser	99	99	99	99	396	34	
12	Kazakhstan (KAZ)	288	292	294	292	1166	72	
	Olga Dovgun	95	100	99	96	390	27	
	Alexandra Malinovskaya	96	96	97	98	387	22	
	Olessya Snegirevich	97	96	98	98	389	23	
13	Malaysia (MAS)	295	283	296	292	1166	71	
	Nur Ayuni Farhana	98	85	98	98	379	18	
	Shahera Rahim Raja	97	100	98	95	390	21	
	Nur Suryani Taibi	100	98	100	99	397	32	
14	Qatar (QAT)	295	291	291	286	1163	62	
	Mahbubeh Akhlaghi	99	98	98	97	392	24	
	Bahiya Al-Hamad	98	98	98	98	392	25	
	Shaikha Al-Mohammed	98	95	95	91	379	13	
15	Nepal (NEP)	286	284	288	288	1146	51	
	Juhi Chaudhary	97	96	92	93	378	15	
	Asmita Rai	96	96	96	95	383	18	
	Sneh Rana	95	96	98	96	385	18	
