= Shooting at the 2010 Asian Games – Women's 50 metre rifle prone =

Women's 50 metre rifle prone at the 2010 Asian Games
- Venue: Aoti Shooting Range
- Dates: 15 November 2010
- Competitors: 50 from 20 nations

Medalists
gold medal	Wang Chengyi	China
silver medal	Olga Dovgun	Kazakhstan
bronze medal	Seiko Iwata	Japan

The women's 50 metre rifle prone competition at the 2010 Asian Games in Guangzhou, China was held on 15 November at the Aoti Shooting Range.

== Schedule ==
All times are China Standard Time (UTC+08:00)

Date	Time	Event
Monday, 15 November 2010	11:30	Final

== Records ==
Prior to this competition, the existing world, Asian and Games records were as follows.

World Record	Marina Bobkova (RUS)	597	Barcelona, Spain	19 July 1998
Asian Record	Olga Dovgun (KAZ)	597	Lahti, Finland	4 July 2002
Games Record	Olga Dovgun (KAZ)	597	Busan, South Korea	4 October 2002

== Results ==
Rank	Athlete	Series						Total	Xs	Notes
Rank	Athlete	1	2	3	4	5	6	Total	Xs	Notes
1st place, gold medalist(s)	Wang Chengyi (CHN)	100	98	98	99	100	100	595	38	
2nd place, silver medalist(s)	Olga Dovgun (KAZ)	99	99	99	99	97	99	592	40	
3rd place, bronze medalist(s)	Seiko Iwata (JPN)	98	99	95	100	100	100	592	38	
4	Kim Jung-mi (KOR)	99	99	99	97	100	98	592	38	
5	Lee Yun-chae (KOR)	98	98	98	100	99	99	592	30	
6	Ratchadaporn Plengsaengthong (THA)	98	98	98	99	99	99	591	35	
7	Kwon Na-ra (KOR)	99	99	97	98	99	99	591	33	
8	Shahera Rahim Raja (MAS)	99	97	98	99	98	98	589	30	
9	Supamas Wankaew (THA)	98	98	97	97	99	99	588	31	
10	Chuluunbadrakhyn Narantuyaa (MGL)	99	98	97	99	97	98	588	31	
11	Tejaswini Sawant (IND)	97	100	99	98	97	97	588	30	
12	Sakina Mamedova (UZB)	98	95	97	99	99	99	587	29	
13	Hou Xiaoyu (CHN)	96	99	97	99	97	98	586	27	
14	Meena Kumari (IND)	99	96	97	98	98	98	586	26	
15	Elena Kuznetsova (UZB)	99	95	97	97	99	99	586	23	
16	Lajja Goswami (IND)	97	96	99	100	96	97	585	32	
17	Nur Suryani Taibi (MAS)	98	98	99	97	95	98	585	29	
18	Olessya Snegirevich (KAZ)	99	98	98	99	95	96	585	28	
19	Yuka Nakamura (JPN)	97	92	99	99	98	99	584	28	
20	Vitchuda Pichitkanjanakul (THA)	97	96	98	95	99	99	584	25	
21	Asma Al-Nuaimi (UAE)	98	96	97	98	98	96	583	28	
22	Aqilah Sudhir (SIN)	98	94	98	97	98	98	583	24	
23	Maryam Talebi (IRI)	98	98	96	97	97	97	583	22	
24	Lương Thị Bạch Dương (VIE)	98	97	98	97	98	94	582	29	
25	Erlinawati (INA)	97	97	99	94	98	97	582	25	
26	Olzvoibaataryn Yanjinlkham (MGL)	98	98	100	96	96	94	582	23	
27	Alexandra Malinovskaya (KAZ)	96	96	96	96	99	99	582	21	
28	Sabrina Sultana (BAN)	96	95	96	97	99	98	581	26	
29	Bahiya Al-Hamad (QAT)	100	97	95	95	95	99	581	21	
30	Mahbubeh Akhlaghi (QAT)	97	96	98	97	96	97	581	21	
31	Maharani Ardy (INA)	95	95	97	98	98	97	580	26	
32	Zorigtyn Batkhuyag (MGL)	97	96	97	96	98	96	580	26	
33	Mahlagha Jambozorg (IRI)	97	97	96	96	97	97	580	20	
34	Elaheh Ahmadi (IRI)	97	94	97	97	98	97	580	17	
35	Huang Na (CHN)	96	95	100	96	96	96	579	28	
36	Ýeketerina Arabowa (TKM)	93	98	97	96	99	96	579	22	
37	Azza Al-Qasmi (BRN)	96	96	98	98	96	95	579	21	
38	Yana Fatkhi (UZB)	94	97	98	95	96	97	577	25	
39	Haw Siew Peng (SIN)	94	96	95	97	97	97	576	24	
40	Maki Konomoto (JPN)	97	96	98	96	94	95	576	22	
41	Jasmine Ser (SIN)	94	93	97	98	95	98	575	24	
42	Rachma Saraswati (INA)	95	96	97	97	97	93	575	22	
43	Shamsa Al-Marzouqi (UAE)	92	96	97	98	94	97	574	22	
44	Tripti Datta (BAN)	91	94	96	97	96	95	569	17	
45	Shaikha Al-Mohammed (QAT)	97	93	96	96	95	90	567	11	
46	Sarmin Shilpa (BAN)	95	90	94	97	94	96	566	15	
47	Urooj Fatima (PAK)	94	94	96	92	93	96	565	22	
48	Mariani Rafali (MAS)	94	95	95	95	95	91	565	17	
49	Charisse Palma (PHI)	95	93	94	91	94	97	564	16	
50	Nazish Khan (PAK)	93	93	98	92	95	90	561	17	
