= Shooting at the 2010 Asian Games – Women's 50 metre rifle three positions =

Women's 50 metre rifle 3 positions at the 2010 Asian Games
- Venue: Aoti Shooting Range
- Dates: 17 November 2010
- Competitors: 45 from 18 nations

Medalists
gold medal	Wang Chengyi	China
silver medal	Elaheh Ahmadi	Iran
bronze medal	Wu Liuxi	China

The women's 50 metre rifle three positions competition at the 2010 Asian Games in Guangzhou, China was held on 17 November at the Aoti Shooting Range.

== Schedule ==
All times are China Standard Time (UTC+08:00)

Date	Time	Event
Wednesday, 17 November 2010	09:00	Qualification
Wednesday, 17 November 2010	12:30	Final

== Records ==
Prior to this competition, the existing world, Asian and Games records were as follows.

Qualification
World Record	Sonja Pfeilschifter (GER)	594	Munich, Germany	28 May 2006
Asian Record	Shan Hong (CHN)	592	Milan, Italy	28 May 1999
Games Record	Du Li (CHN)	588	Busan, South Korea	6 October 2002
Final
World Record	Sonja Pfeilschifter (GER)	698.0	Munich, Germany	28 May 2006
Asian Record	Du Li (CHN)	692.7	Beijing, China	17 April 2008
Games Record	Du Li (CHN)	685.5	Busan, South Korea	6 October 2002

== Results ==
=== Qualification ===
Rank	Athlete	Prone		Standing		Kneeling		Total	Xs	S-off	Notes
Rank	Athlete	1	2	1	2	1	2	Total	Xs	S-off	Notes
1	Wang Chengyi (CHN)	99	97	99	95	97	97	584	28		
2	Elaheh Ahmadi (IRI)	100	98	97	98	94	95	582	29		
3	Wu Liuxi (CHN)	95	95	96	99	94	99	578	26		
4	Maki Konomoto (JPN)	98	99	96	92	97	96	578	24		
5	Kwon Na-ra (KOR)	98	100	94	97	95	94	578	22		
6	Elena Kuznetsova (UZB)	96	98	95	96	96	97	578	20		
7	Lee Yun-chae (KOR)	97	98	96	95	96	94	576	28		
8	Na Yoon-kyung (KOR)	97	98	96	93	93	97	574	23		
9	Nur Suryani Taibi (MAS)	97	99	91	96	94	96	573	26		
10	Thanyalak Chotphibunsin (THA)	98	96	93	92	97	97	573	23		
11	Jasmine Ser (SIN)	96	98	95	96	93	95	573	21		
12	Chuluunbadrakhyn Narantuyaa (MGL)	96	99	93	94	95	96	573	17		
13	Sakina Mamedova (UZB)	98	97	93	91	94	99	572	23		
14	Olga Dovgun (KAZ)	98	99	89	94	96	96	572	22		
15	Olzvoibaataryn Yanjinlkham (MGL)	99	99	95	97	92	90	572	22		
16	Maryam Talebi (IRI)	97	98	97	95	93	92	572	20		
17	Zorigtyn Batkhuyag (MGL)	99	97	92	90	97	96	571	20		
18	Yi Siling (CHN)	95	96	95	94	95	96	571	17		
19	Seiko Iwata (JPN)	97	98	92	96	94	93	570	23		
20	Supamas Wankaew (THA)	99	99	92	97	91	92	570	20		
21	Olessya Snegirevich (KAZ)	98	100	89	95	95	93	570	14		
22	Alexandra Malinovskaya (KAZ)	97	97	91	92	97	95	569	22		
23	Tejaswini Sawant (IND)	98	98	92	93	95	93	569	19		
24	Lajja Goswami (IND)	98	99	93	90	96	93	569	13		
25	Sununta Majchacheep (THA)	98	97	92	91	94	95	567	16		
26	Mahlagha Jambozorg (IRI)	94	95	93	93	96	94	565	17		
27	Aqilah Sudhir (SIN)	97	96	91	87	96	97	564	16		
28	Yuka Nakamura (JPN)	98	94	91	89	95	96	563	22		
29	Nur Ayuni Farhana (MAS)	96	92	95	93	95	92	563	15		
30	Yana Fatkhi (UZB)	91	97	96	92	94	91	561	13		
31	Chetanpreet Nilon (IND)	96	94	90	93	93	93	559	15		
32	Sabrina Sultana (BAN)	96	97	93	92	87	94	559	10		
33	Asma Al-Nuaimi (UAE)	99	97	86	88	91	97	558	13		
34	Ýeketerina Arabowa (TKM)	98	91	90	90	94	95	558	13		
35	Bahiya Al-Hamad (QAT)	98	95	94	88	91	90	556	13		
36	Shahera Rahim Raja (MAS)	93	96	89	91	95	90	554	15		
37	Lương Thị Bạch Dương (VIE)	91	97	93	86	93	94	554	12		
38	Urooj Fatima (PAK)	95	96	89	90	92	91	553	12		
39	Shaikha Al-Mohammed (QAT)	100	95	87	90	87	92	551	16		
40	Haw Siew Peng (SIN)	93	94	90	89	92	93	551	11		
41	Tripti Datta (BAN)	96	94	90	91	89	90	550	11		
42	Azza Al-Qasmi (BRN)	96	97	86	82	94	92	547	13		
43	Shamsa Al-Marzouqi (UAE)	91	99	90	80	92	92	544	14		
44	Nazish Khan (PAK)	94	92	90	89	85	93	543	10		
45	Sarmin Shilpa (BAN)	94	94	82	86	92	87	535	9		

=== Final ===
Rank	Athlete	Qual.	Final											Total	S-off	Notes
Rank	Athlete	Qual.	1	2	3	4	5	6	7	8	9	10	Total	Total	S-off	Notes
1st place, gold medalist(s)	Wang Chengyi (CHN)	584	10.3	10.5	9.2	10.7	8.9	9.6	9.9	9.4	10.1	10.3	98.9	682.9		
2nd place, silver medalist(s)	Elaheh Ahmadi (IRI)	582	10.8	9.8	8.9	10.6	8.9	9.6	10.1	10.0	10.1	10.6	99.4	681.4		
3rd place, bronze medalist(s)	Wu Liuxi (CHN)	578	10.1	10.3	10.0	10.7	10.5	10.5	10.0	10.8	9.1	10.1	102.1	680.1		
4	Maki Konomoto (JPN)	578	10.5	7.9	10.0	9.5	10.2	10.8	10.7	9.3	10.3	10.8	100.0	678.0		
5	Kwon Na-ra (KOR)	578	10.1	10.6	9.0	10.0	8.8	9.4	9.9	10.0	10.1	10.1	98.0	676.0		
6	Lee Yun-chae (KOR)	576	9.3	10.2	9.6	10.2	10.5	10.2	10.0	9.0	9.9	10.3	99.2	675.2		
7	Elena Kuznetsova (UZB)	578	7.2	10.6	10.4	8.4	10.1	9.3	9.5	10.3	10.6	9.2	95.6	673.6		
8	Na Yoon-kyung (KOR)	574	9.0	9.8	9.9	9.4	9.5	9.9	9.8	9.9	9.4	9.8	96.4	670.4		
