= Shooting at the 2014 Asian Games – Women's 50 metre rifle three positions =

Women's 50 metre rifle 3 positions at the 2014 Asian Games
- Venue: Ongnyeon International Shooting Range
- Dates: 26 September 2014
- Competitors: 41 from 17 nations

Medalists
gold medal	Olga Dovgun	Kazakhstan
silver medal	Jeong Mi-ra	South Korea
bronze medal	Chang Jing	China

The women's 50 metre rifle three positions competition at the 2014 Asian Games in Incheon, South Korea was held on 26 September at the Ongnyeon International Shooting Range.

== Schedule ==
All times are Korea Standard Time (UTC+09:00)

Date	Time	Event
Friday, 26 September 2014	09:00	Qualification
Friday, 26 September 2014	12:15	Final

== Records ==
Prior to this competition, the existing world, Asian and Games records were as follows.

Qualification
World Record	Natallia Kalnysh (UKR)	592	Munich, Germany	11 June 2014
Asian Record	Wu Liuxi (CHN)	590	Fort Benning, United States	10 May 2013
Games Record	—	—	—	—
Final
World Record	Petra Zublasing (ITA)	462.7	Munich, Germany	10 November 2013
Asian Record	Chang Jing (CHN)	460.2	Tehran, Iran	22 October 2013
Games Record	—	—	—	—

== Results ==
Legend

- DNS — Did not start

=== Qualification ===
Rank	Athlete	Kneeling		Prone		Standing		Total	Xs	Notes
Rank	Athlete	1	2	1	2	1	2	Total	Xs	Notes
1	Jasmine Ser (SIN)	99	100	98	99	97	97	590	34	GR
2	Chuluunbadrakhyn Narantuyaa (MGL)	98	99	100	98	93	95	583	32	
3	Jeong Mi-ra (KOR)	96	99	98	98	97	95	583	30	
4	Lajja Goswami (IND)	96	97	100	99	96	94	582	25	
5	Olga Dovgun (KAZ)	96	97	98	100	95	95	581	29	
6	Chang Jing (CHN)	94	99	98	100	96	93	580	23	
7	Zhao Huixin (CHN)	94	96	99	98	96	96	579	17	
8	Chen Dongqi (CHN)	96	94	97	99	97	95	578	29	
9	Mahlagha Jambozorg (IRI)	97	96	95	96	95	99	578	22	
10	Yoo Seo-young (KOR)	98	97	99	98	89	95	576	24	
11	Nur Suryani Taibi (MAS)	96	96	98	99	95	92	576	24	
12	Nguyễn Thị Xuân (VIE)	97	97	98	98	91	95	576	23	
13	Li Yafei (SIN)	97	97	97	99	91	95	576	18	
14	Bahiya Al-Hamad (QAT)	95	96	98	99	95	92	575	24	
15	Sununta Majchacheep (THA)	96	97	98	98	94	92	575	21	
16	Gankhuyagiin Nandinzayaa (MGL)	95	96	98	97	93	96	575	20	
17	Kim Seol-a (KOR)	97	96	97	96	96	93	575	20	
18	Nur Ayuni Farhana (MAS)	96	95	99	95	96	94	575	18	
19	Alexandra Malinovskaya (KAZ)	95	98	99	98	90	94	574	27	
20	Sakina Mamedova (UZB)	97	97	100	100	91	89	574	26	
21	Maki Matsumoto (JPN)	96	98	97	98	94	91	574	20	
22	Dina Farzadkhah (IRI)	96	94	99	98	91	96	574	17	
23	Mariya Filimonova (UZB)	91	93	99	99	94	97	573	25	
24	Seiko Iwata (JPN)	94	98	97	98	93	93	573	19	
25	Anjali Bhagwat (IND)	98	95	96	97	90	96	572	23	
26	Muslifah Zulkifli (MAS)	98	94	99	98	90	93	572	21	
27	Yelizaveta Lunina (KAZ)	94	94	99	97	95	93	572	17	
28	Elaheh Ahmadi (IRI)	96	90	96	97	92	98	569	14	
29	Tejaswini Muley (IND)	96	94	94	95	92	97	568	20	
30	Sabina Krupnova (KGZ)	94	93	98	97	94	92	568	13	
31	Olzvoibaataryn Yanjinlkham (MGL)	91	92	95	96	95	98	567	19	
32	Margarita Orlova (UZB)	94	92	96	97	93	94	566	20	
33	Yuka Isobe (JPN)	90	94	95	94	95	98	566	15	
34	Nguyễn Thị Hằng (VIE)	94	93	97	97	92	92	565	22	
35	Aisha Al-Suwaidi (QAT)	95	95	97	97	91	89	564	17	
36	Maryam Arzouqi (KUW)	95	89	96	97	91	96	564	15	
37	Vitchuda Pichitkanjanakul (THA)	95	96	99	95	88	91	564	12	
38	Nadira Raees (PAK)	95	90	96	99	92	90	562	18	
39	Supamas Wankaew (THA)	94	93	98	99	90	88	562	15	
40	Aisha Al-Mutawa (QAT)	94	93	98	95	86	87	553	14	
—	Azza Al-Qasmi (BRN)							DNS		

=== Final ===
Rank	Athlete	Kneeling			Prone			Standing – Elimination							S-off	Notes
Rank	Athlete	1	2	3	1	2	3	1	2	3	4	5	6	7	S-off	Notes
1st place, gold medalist(s)	Olga Dovgun (KAZ)	50.8	102.3	152.2	204.9	257.2	308.3	357.0	406.4	416.9	427.0	436.4	446.4	456.4		GR
2nd place, silver medalist(s)	Jeong Mi-ra (KOR)	50.9	102.8	154.5	206.8	258.9	310.0	358.4	406.8	417.1	427.5	437.5	447.1	455.5		
3rd place, bronze medalist(s)	Chang Jing (CHN)	49.1	100.1	152.1	202.0	253.6	306.3	356.5	407.2	416.7	426.2	436.1	446.2			
4	Chen Dongqi (CHN)	49.1	101.5	152.7	204.5	256.0	307.5	353.5	402.3	412.0	422.8	433.4				
5	Zhao Huixin (CHN)	46.1	98.2	149.2	199.5	250.9	302.6	353.5	403.7	413.0	422.4					
6	Jasmine Ser (SIN)	51.8	104.2	154.1	205.4	254.7	306.5	355.2	401.9	411.3						
7	Lajja Goswami (IND)	50.2	100.7	150.5	202.5	253.5	304.2	352.6	401.6							
8	Chuluunbadrakhyn Narantuyaa (MGL)	50.1	98.6	148.4	200.8	251.3	302.3	350.1	399.0							
