= Shooting at the 2010 Asian Games – Women's 50 metre rifle prone team =

Women's 50 metre rifle prone team at the 2010 Asian Games
- Venue: Aoti Shooting Range
- Dates: 15 November 2010
- Competitors: 42 from 14 nations

Medalists
gold medal	South Korea; Kim Jung-mi, Kwon Na-ra, Lee Yun-chae
silver medal	Thailand; Vitchuda Pichitkanjanakul, Ratchadaporn Plengsaengthong, Supamas Wankaew
bronze medal	China; Hou Xiaoyu, Huang Na, Wang Chengyi

The women's 50 metre rifle prone team competition at the 2010 Asian Games in Guangzhou, China was held on 15 November at the Aoti Shooting Range.

== Schedule ==
All times are China Standard Time (UTC+08:00)

Date	Time	Event
Monday, 15 November 2010	11:30	Final

== Records ==
Prior to this competition, the existing world, Asian and Games records were as follows.

World Record	Soviet Union	1786	Moscow, Soviet Union	15 August 1990
Asian Record	South Korea	1779	Munich, Germany	7 August 2010
Games Record	China; South Korea	1778	Busan, South Korea	4 October 2002

== Results ==
Rank	Team	Series						Total	Xs	Notes
Rank	Team	1	2	3	4	5	6	Total	Xs	Notes
1st place, gold medalist(s)	South Korea (KOR)	296	296	294	295	298	296	1775	101	
	Kim Jung-mi	99	99	99	97	100	98	592	38	
	Kwon Na-ra	99	99	97	98	99	99	591	33	
	Lee Yun-chae	98	98	98	100	99	99	592	30	
2nd place, silver medalist(s)	Thailand (THA)	293	292	293	291	297	297	1763	91	
	Vitchuda Pichitkanjanakul	97	96	98	95	99	99	584	25	
	Ratchadaporn Plengsaengthong	98	98	98	99	99	99	591	35	
	Supamas Wankaew	98	98	97	97	99	99	588	31	
3rd place, bronze medalist(s)	China (CHN)	292	292	295	294	293	294	1760	93	
	Hou Xiaoyu	96	99	97	99	97	98	586	27	
	Huang Na	96	95	100	96	96	96	579	28	
	Wang Chengyi	100	98	98	99	100	100	595	38	
4	Kazakhstan (KAZ)	294	293	293	294	291	294	1759	89	
	Olga Dovgun	99	99	99	99	97	99	592	40	
	Alexandra Malinovskaya	96	96	96	96	99	99	582	21	
	Olessya Snegirevich	99	98	98	99	95	96	585	28	
5	India (IND)	293	292	295	296	291	292	1759	88	
	Lajja Goswami	97	96	99	100	96	97	585	32	
	Meena Kumari	99	96	97	98	98	98	586	26	
	Tejaswini Sawant	97	100	99	98	97	97	588	30	
6	Japan (JPN)	292	287	292	295	292	294	1752	88	
	Seiko Iwata	98	99	95	100	100	100	592	38	
	Maki Konomoto	97	96	98	96	94	95	576	22	
	Yuka Nakamura	97	92	99	99	98	99	584	28	
7	Mongolia (MGL)	294	292	294	291	291	288	1750	80	
	Zorigtyn Batkhuyag	97	96	97	96	98	96	580	26	
	Chuluunbadrakhyn Narantuyaa	99	98	97	99	97	98	588	31	
	Olzvoibaataryn Yanjinlkham	98	98	100	96	96	94	582	23	
8	Uzbekistan (UZB)	291	287	292	291	294	295	1750	77	
	Yana Fatkhi	94	97	98	95	96	97	577	25	
	Elena Kuznetsova	99	95	97	97	99	99	586	23	
	Sakina Mamedova	98	95	97	99	99	99	587	29	
9	Iran (IRI)	292	289	289	290	292	291	1743	59	
	Elaheh Ahmadi	97	94	97	97	98	97	580	17	
	Mahlagha Jambozorg	97	97	96	96	97	97	580	20	
	Maryam Talebi	98	98	96	97	97	97	583	22	
10	Malaysia (MAS)	291	290	292	291	288	287	1739	76	
	Mariani Rafali	94	95	95	95	95	91	565	17	
	Shahera Rahim Raja	99	97	98	99	98	98	589	30	
	Nur Suryani Taibi	98	98	99	97	95	98	585	29	
11	Indonesia (INA)	287	288	293	289	293	287	1737	73	
	Maharani Ardy	95	95	97	98	98	97	580	26	
	Erlinawati	97	97	99	94	98	97	582	25	
	Rachma Saraswati	95	96	97	97	97	93	575	22	
12	Singapore (SIN)	286	283	290	292	290	293	1734	72	
	Haw Siew Peng	94	96	95	97	97	97	576	24	
	Jasmine Ser	94	93	97	98	95	98	575	24	
	Aqilah Sudhir	98	94	98	97	98	98	583	24	
13	Qatar (QAT)	294	286	289	288	286	286	1729	53	
	Mahbubeh Akhlaghi	97	96	98	97	96	97	581	21	
	Bahiya Al-Hamad	100	97	95	95	95	99	581	21	
	Shaikha Al-Mohammed	97	93	96	96	95	90	567	11	
14	Bangladesh (BAN)	282	279	286	291	289	289	1716	58	
	Tripti Datta	91	94	96	97	96	95	569	17	
	Sarmin Shilpa	95	90	94	97	94	96	566	15	
	Sabrina Sultana	96	95	96	97	99	98	581	26	
