= Shooting at the 2014 Asian Games – Women's 10 metre air rifle =

Women's 10 metre air rifle at the 2014 Asian Games
- Venue: Ongnyeon International Shooting Range
- Dates: 22 September 2014
- Competitors: 54 from 21 nations

Medalists
gold medal	Najmeh Khedmati	Iran
silver medal	Narjes Emamgholinejad	Iran
bronze medal	Zhang Binbin	China

The women's 10 metre air rifle competition at the 2014 Asian Games in Incheon, South Korea was held on 22 September at the Ongnyeon International Shooting Range.

== Schedule ==
All times are Korea Standard Time (UTC+09:00)

Date	Time	Event
Monday, 22 September 2014	09:00	Qualification
Monday, 22 September 2014	12:30	Final

== Records ==
Prior to this competition, the existing world, Asian and Games records were as follows.

Qualification
World Record	Yi Siling (CHN)	422.5	Munich, Germany	9 November 2013
Asian Record	Yi Siling (CHN)	422.5	Munich, Germany	9 November 2013
Games Record	—	—	—	—
Final
World Record	Yi Siling (CHN)	211.0	Beijing, China	3 July 2014
Asian Record	Yi Siling (CHN)	211.0	Beijing, China	3 July 2014
Games Record	—	—	—	—

== Results ==
=== Qualification ===
Rank	Athlete	Series				Total	Notes
Rank	Athlete	1	2	3	4	Total	Notes
1	Yi Siling (CHN)	103.9	105.0	105.1	104.7	418.7	GR
2	Zhang Binbin (CHN)	105.7	104.5	104.2	103.9	418.3	
3	Ayonika Paul (IND)	103.9	103.9	105.2	104.7	417.7	
4	Najmeh Khedmati (IRI)	105.0	105.2	104.2	102.8	417.2	
5	Wu Liuxi (CHN)	104.3	104.1	103.7	104.7	416.8	
6	Narjes Emamgholinejad (IRI)	104.9	105.2	102.3	103.9	416.3	
7	Kim Seol-a (KOR)	102.6	104.7	103.9	104.8	416.0	
8	Jasmine Ser (SIN)	104.5	105.6	103.4	102.4	415.9	
9	Gankhuyagiin Nandinzayaa (MGL)	102.4	102.7	104.6	105.2	414.9	
10	Kim Gae-nam (KOR)	103.2	101.9	104.3	105.0	414.4	
11	Nur Suryani Taibi (MAS)	103.9	103.3	104.2	102.9	414.3	
12	Mariya Filimonova (UZB)	103.1	104.1	103.4	103.6	414.2	
13	Apurvi Chandela (IND)	103.2	102.9	105.2	102.5	413.8	
14	Martina Veloso (SIN)	102.9	103.6	103.6	103.5	413.6	
15	Margarita Orlova (UZB)	103.3	101.3	104.5	104.4	413.5	
16	Chen Szu-wei (TPE)	101.9	104.3	104.3	102.5	413.0	
17	Nur Ayuni Farhana (MAS)	103.4	102.7	103.2	103.6	412.9	
18	Alexandra Malinovskaya (KAZ)	101.2	104.1	104.3	103.1	412.7	
19	Elaheh Ahmadi (IRI)	101.6	105.3	102.3	103.2	412.4	
20	Aisha Al-Suwaidi (QAT)	103.0	103.6	103.5	102.3	412.4	
21	Sakina Mamedova (UZB)	102.1	102.9	103.8	103.5	412.3	
22	Minhal Sohail (PAK)	102.3	103.0	102.4	104.5	412.2	
23	Maki Matsumoto (JPN)	101.6	105.1	102.7	102.7	412.1	
24	Seiko Iwata (JPN)	101.4	102.1	105.2	103.3	412.0	
25	Olga Dovgun (KAZ)	101.7	104.2	102.2	103.6	411.7	
26	Cheng Jian Huan (SIN)	102.5	102.4	101.5	105.2	411.6	
27	Jeong Mi-ra (KOR)	103.2	103.0	103.6	101.4	411.2	
28	Maryam Arzouqi (KUW)	102.1	102.1	103.9	102.2	410.3	
29	Chuluunbadrakhyn Narantuyaa (MGL)	103.7	104.2	99.2	102.7	409.8	
30	Sununta Majchacheep (THA)	101.3	102.9	103.1	102.5	409.8	
31	Sharmin Akhter (BAN)	101.2	103.9	102.2	101.9	409.2	
32	Muslifah Zulkifli (MAS)	103.6	100.2	102.9	102.4	409.1	
33	Yuka Isobe (JPN)	103.9	102.4	102.4	100.4	409.1	
34	Sadiya Sultana (BAN)	102.1	101.2	102.7	102.8	408.8	
35	Olzvoibaataryn Yanjinlkham (MGL)	102.3	102.9	99.3	104.0	408.5	
36	Raj Chaudhary (IND)	100.4	102.6	101.9	102.7	407.6	
37	Sharmin Ratna (BAN)	102.3	100.7	101.2	102.8	407.0	
38	Bahiya Al-Hamad (QAT)	102.3	101.6	102.0	100.3	406.2	
39	Aseel Mohamed Abdulghaffar (BRN)	100.2	99.2	102.5	103.6	405.5	
40	Malika Lagutenko (TJK)	100.5	100.6	102.0	102.4	405.5	
41	Nawinda Kasemkiatthai (THA)	101.2	100.2	100.7	103.2	405.3	
42	Lyubov Lapshina (TJK)	101.2	101.1	101.1	100.5	403.9	
43	Siham Al-Hasani (OMA)	102.6	102.4	104.1	94.3	403.4	
44	Yodtien Pratumtong (THA)	101.1	101.4	99.7	101.1	403.3	
45	Aisha Al-Mutawa (QAT)	102.2	99.5	99.2	101.4	402.3	
46	Lulwa Mohamed Ashoor (BRN)	98.8	100.4	102.0	100.3	401.5	
47	Lenchu Kunzang (BHU)	98.5	100.5	99.4	100.1	398.5	
48	Sneh Rana (NEP)	96.6	100.4	100.4	100.2	397.6	
49	Munira Al-Anjari (KUW)	101.7	99.4	99.3	96.4	396.8	
50	Yelizaveta Lunina (KAZ)	98.9	92.3	102.1	102.9	396.2	
51	Anisa Shomakhmadova (TJK)	99.7	100.6	97.5	97.2	395.0	
52	Phool Maya Kyapchhaki (NEP)	97.9	99.4	99.8	96.6	393.7	
53	Nadira Raees (PAK)	94.0	100.9	98.2	97.6	390.7	
54	Asmita Rai (NEP)	93.2	92.6	97.9	97.5	381.2	

=== Final ===
Rank	Athlete	1st stage		2nd stage – Elimination							S-off	Notes
Rank	Athlete	1	2	1	2	3	4	5	6	7	S-off	Notes
1st place, gold medalist(s)	Najmeh Khedmati (IRI)	30.8	61.9	82.6	103.8	124.4	145.7	166.5	187.5	207.9		GR
2nd place, silver medalist(s)	Narjes Emamgholinejad (IRI)	31.0	63.2	84.1	104.2	125.0	146.3	167.0	186.7	206.6		
3rd place, bronze medalist(s)	Zhang Binbin (CHN)	31.2	62.3	83.7	103.4	124.2	144.8	165.5	186.3			
4	Jasmine Ser (SIN)	30.8	61.6	81.7	103.0	123.6	144.5	164.9				
5	Yi Siling (CHN)	30.5	61.6	82.5	103.2	123.4	144.1					
6	Wu Liuxi (CHN)	30.2	61.3	82.3	102.5	123.2						
7	Ayonika Paul (IND)	30.8	61.4	81.7	101.9							
8	Kim Seol-a (KOR)	30.2	60.9	81.5								
