= Shooting at the 2014 Asian Games – Women's 50 metre rifle three positions team =

Women's 50 metre rifle 3 positions team at the 2014 Asian Games
- Venue: Ongnyeon International Shooting Range
- Dates: 26 September 2014
- Competitors: 33 from 11 nations

Medalists
gold medal	China; Chang Jing, Chen Dongqi, Zhao Huixin
silver medal	South Korea; Jeong Mi-ra, Kim Seol-a, Yoo Seo-young
bronze medal	Kazakhstan; Olga Dovgun, Yelizaveta Lunina, Alexandra Malinovskaya

The women's 50 metre rifle three positions team competition at the 2014 Asian Games in Incheon, South Korea was held on 26 September at the Ongnyeon International Shooting Range.

== Schedule ==
All times are Korea Standard Time (UTC+09:00)

Date	Time	Event
Friday, 26 September 2014	09:00	Final

== Records ==
Prior to this competition, the existing world, Asian and Games records were as follows.

World Record	Germany	1750	Granada, Spain	11 September 2014
Asian Record	China	1740	Tehran, Iran	22 October 2013
Games Record	—	—	—	—

== Results ==
Rank	Team	Kneeling		Prone		Standing		Total	Xs	Notes
Rank	Team	1	2	1	2	1	2	Total	Xs	Notes
1st place, gold medalist(s)	China (CHN)	284	289	294	297	289	284	1737	69	GR
	Chang Jing	94	99	98	100	96	93	580	23	
	Chen Dongqi	96	94	97	99	97	95	578	29	
	Zhao Huixin	94	96	99	98	96	96	579	17	
2nd place, silver medalist(s)	South Korea (KOR)	291	292	294	292	282	283	1734	74	
	Jeong Mi-ra	96	99	98	98	97	95	583	30	
	Kim Seol-a	97	96	97	96	96	93	575	20	
	Yoo Seo-young	98	97	99	98	89	95	576	24	
3rd place, bronze medalist(s)	Kazakhstan (KAZ)	285	289	296	295	280	282	1727	73	
	Olga Dovgun	96	97	98	100	95	95	581	29	
	Yelizaveta Lunina	94	94	99	97	95	93	572	17	
	Alexandra Malinovskaya	95	98	99	98	90	94	574	27	
4	Mongolia (MGL)	284	287	293	291	281	289	1725	71	
	Gankhuyagiin Nandinzayaa	95	96	98	97	93	96	575	20	
	Chuluunbadrakhyn Narantuyaa	98	99	100	98	93	95	583	32	
	Olzvoibaataryn Yanjinlkham	91	92	95	96	95	98	567	19	
5	Malaysia (MAS)	290	285	296	292	281	279	1723	63	
	Nur Ayuni Farhana	96	95	99	95	96	94	575	18	
	Nur Suryani Taibi	96	96	98	99	95	92	576	24	
	Muslifah Zulkifli	98	94	99	98	90	93	572	21	
6	India (IND)	290	286	290	291	278	287	1722	68	
	Anjali Bhagwat	98	95	96	97	90	96	572	23	
	Lajja Goswami	96	97	100	99	96	94	582	25	
	Tejaswini Muley	96	94	94	95	92	97	568	20	
7	Iran (IRI)	289	280	290	291	278	293	1721	53	
	Elaheh Ahmadi	96	90	96	97	92	98	569	14	
	Dina Farzadkhah	96	94	99	98	91	96	574	17	
	Mahlagha Jambozorg	97	96	95	96	95	99	578	22	
8	Uzbekistan (UZB)	282	282	295	296	278	280	1713	71	
	Mariya Filimonova	91	93	99	99	94	97	573	25	
	Sakina Mamedova	97	97	100	100	91	89	574	26	
	Margarita Orlova	94	92	96	97	93	94	566	20	
9	Japan (JPN)	280	290	289	290	282	282	1713	54	
	Yuka Isobe	90	94	95	94	95	98	566	15	
	Seiko Iwata	94	98	97	98	93	93	573	19	
	Maki Matsumoto	96	98	97	98	94	91	574	20	
10	Thailand (THA)	285	286	295	292	272	271	1701	48	
	Sununta Majchacheep	96	97	98	98	94	92	575	21	
	Vitchuda Pichitkanjanakul	95	96	99	95	88	91	564	12	
	Supamas Wankaew	94	93	98	99	90	88	562	15	
11	Qatar (QAT)	284	284	293	291	272	268	1692	55	
	Bahiya Al-Hamad	95	96	98	99	95	92	575	24	
	Aisha Al-Mutawa	94	93	98	95	86	87	553	14	
	Aisha Al-Suwaidi	95	95	97	97	91	89	564	17	
