= Shooting at the 2014 Asian Games – Women's 10 metre air rifle team =

Women's 10 metre air rifle team at the 2014 Asian Games
- Venue: Ongnyeon International Shooting Range
- Dates: 22 September 2014
- Competitors: 45 from 15 nations

Medalists
gold medal	China; Wu Liuxi, Yi Siling, Zhang Binbin
silver medal	Iran; Elaheh Ahmadi, Narjes Emamgholinejad, Najmeh Khedmati
bronze medal	South Korea; Jeong Mi-ra, Kim Gae-nam, Kim Seol-a

The women's 10 metre air rifle team competition at the 2014 Asian Games in Incheon, South Korea was held on 22 September at the Ongnyeon International Shooting Range.

== Schedule ==
All times are Korea Standard Time (UTC+09:00)

Date	Time	Event
Monday, 22 September 2014	09:00	Final

== Records ==
Prior to this competition, the existing world, Asian and Games records were as follows.

World Record	China	1253.7	Tehran, Iran	24 October 2013
Asian Record	China	1253.7	Tehran, Iran	24 October 2013
Games Record	—	—	—	—

== Results ==
Rank	Team	Series				Total	Notes
Rank	Team	1	2	3	4	Total	Notes
1st place, gold medalist(s)	China (CHN)	313.9	313.6	313.0	313.3	1253.8	WR
	Wu Liuxi	104.3	104.1	103.7	104.7	416.8	
	Yi Siling	103.9	105.0	105.1	104.7	418.7	
	Zhang Binbin	105.7	104.5	104.2	103.9	418.3	
2nd place, silver medalist(s)	Iran (IRI)	311.5	315.7	308.8	309.9	1245.9	
	Elaheh Ahmadi	101.6	105.3	102.3	103.2	412.4	
	Narjes Emamgholinejad	104.9	105.2	102.3	103.9	416.3	
	Najmeh Khedmati	105.0	105.2	104.2	102.8	417.2	
3rd place, bronze medalist(s)	South Korea (KOR)	309.0	309.6	311.8	311.2	1241.6	
	Jeong Mi-ra	103.2	103.0	103.6	101.4	411.2	
	Kim Gae-nam	103.2	101.9	104.3	105.0	414.4	
	Kim Seol-a	102.6	104.7	103.9	104.8	416.0	
4	Singapore (SIN)	309.9	311.6	308.5	311.1	1241.1	
	Cheng Jian Huan	102.5	102.4	101.5	105.2	411.6	
	Jasmine Ser	104.5	105.6	103.4	102.4	415.9	
	Martina Veloso	102.9	103.6	103.6	103.5	413.6	
5	Uzbekistan (UZB)	308.5	308.3	311.7	311.5	1240.0	
	Mariya Filimonova	103.1	104.1	103.4	103.6	414.2	
	Sakina Mamedova	102.1	102.9	103.8	103.5	412.3	
	Margarita Orlova	103.3	101.3	104.5	104.4	413.5	
6	India (IND)	307.5	309.4	312.3	309.9	1239.1	
	Apurvi Chandela	103.2	102.9	105.2	102.5	413.8	
	Raj Chaudhary	100.4	102.6	101.9	102.7	407.6	
	Ayonika Paul	103.9	103.9	105.2	104.7	417.7	
7	Malaysia (MAS)	310.9	306.2	310.3	308.9	1236.3	
	Nur Ayuni Farhana	103.4	102.7	103.2	103.6	412.9	
	Nur Suryani Taibi	103.9	103.3	104.2	102.9	414.3	
	Muslifah Zulkifli	103.6	100.2	102.9	102.4	409.1	
8	Mongolia (MGL)	308.4	309.8	303.1	311.9	1233.2	
	Gankhuyagiin Nandinzayaa	102.4	102.7	104.6	105.2	414.9	
	Chuluunbadrakhyn Narantuyaa	103.7	104.2	99.2	102.7	409.8	
	Olzvoibaataryn Yanjinlkham	102.3	102.9	99.3	104.0	408.5	
9	Japan (JPN)	306.9	309.6	310.3	306.4	1233.2	
	Yuka Isobe	103.9	102.4	102.4	100.4	409.1	
	Seiko Iwata	101.4	102.1	105.2	103.3	412.0	
	Maki Matsumoto	101.6	105.1	102.7	102.7	412.1	
10	Bangladesh (BAN)	305.6	305.8	306.1	307.5	1225.0	
	Sharmin Akhter	101.2	103.9	102.2	101.9	409.2	
	Sharmin Ratna	102.3	100.7	101.2	102.8	407.0	
	Sadiya Sultana	102.1	101.2	102.7	102.8	408.8	
11	Qatar (QAT)	307.5	304.7	304.7	304.0	1220.9	
	Bahiya Al-Hamad	102.3	101.6	102.0	100.3	406.2	
	Aisha Al-Mutawa	102.2	99.5	99.2	101.4	402.3	
	Aisha Al-Suwaidi	103.0	103.6	103.5	102.3	412.4	
12	Kazakhstan (KAZ)	301.8	300.6	308.6	309.6	1220.6	
	Olga Dovgun	101.7	104.2	102.2	103.6	411.7	
	Yelizaveta Lunina	98.9	92.3	102.1	102.9	396.2	
	Alexandra Malinovskaya	101.2	104.1	104.3	103.1	412.7	
13	Thailand (THA)	303.6	304.5	303.5	306.8	1218.4	
	Nawinda Kasemkiatthai	101.2	100.2	100.7	103.2	405.3	
	Sununta Majchacheep	101.3	102.9	103.1	102.5	409.8	
	Yodtien Pratumtong	101.1	101.4	99.7	101.1	403.3	
14	Tajikistan (TJK)	303.6	304.5	303.5	306.8	1218.4	
	Malika Lagutenko	100.5	100.6	102.0	102.4	405.5	
	Lyubov Lapshina	101.2	101.1	101.1	100.5	403.9	
	Anisa Shomakhmadova	99.7	100.6	97.5	97.2	395.0	
15	Nepal (NEP)	303.6	304.5	303.5	306.8	1218.4	
	Phool Maya Kyapchhaki	97.9	99.4	99.8	96.6	393.7	
	Asmita Rai	93.2	92.6	97.9	97.5	381.2	
	Sneh Rana	96.6	100.4	100.4	100.2	397.6	
