= Shooting at the 2010 Asian Games – Women's 50 metre rifle three positions team =

Women's 50 metre rifle 3 positions team at the 2010 Asian Games
- Venue: Aoti Shooting Range
- Dates: 17 November 2010
- Competitors: 36 from 12 nations

Medalists
gold medal	China; Wang Chengyi, Wu Liuxi, Yi Siling
silver medal	South Korea; Kwon Na-ra, Lee Yun-chae, Na Yoon-kyung
bronze medal	Iran; Elaheh Ahmadi, Mahlagha Jambozorg, Maryam Talebi

The women's 50 metre rifle three positions team competition at the 2010 Asian Games in Guangzhou, China was held on 17 November at the Aoti Shooting Range.

== Schedule ==
All times are China Standard Time (UTC+08:00)

Date	Time	Event
Wednesday, 17 November 2010	09:00	Final

== Records ==
Prior to this competition, the existing world, Asian and Games records were as follows.

World Record	United States	1758	Munich, Germany	5 August 2010
Asian Record	China	1754	Barcelona, Spain	24 July 1998
Games Record	China	1754	Busan, South Korea	6 October 2002

== Results ==
Rank	Team	Prone		Standing		Kneeling		Total	Xs	Notes
Rank	Team	1	2	1	2	1	2	Total	Xs	Notes
1st place, gold medalist(s)	China (CHN)	289	288	290	288	286	292	1733	71	
	Wang Chengyi	99	97	99	95	97	97	584	28	
	Wu Liuxi	95	95	96	99	94	99	578	26	
	Yi Siling	95	96	95	94	95	96	571	17	
2nd place, silver medalist(s)	South Korea (KOR)	292	296	286	285	284	285	1728	73	
	Kwon Na-ra	98	100	94	97	95	94	578	22	
	Lee Yun-chae	97	98	96	95	96	94	576	28	
	Na Yoon-kyung	97	98	96	93	93	97	574	23	
3rd place, bronze medalist(s)	Iran (IRI)	291	291	287	286	283	281	1719	66	
	Elaheh Ahmadi	100	98	97	98	94	95	582	29	
	Mahlagha Jambozorg	94	95	93	93	96	94	565	17	
	Maryam Talebi	97	98	97	95	93	92	572	20	
4	Mongolia (MGL)	294	295	280	281	284	282	1716	59	
	Zorigtyn Batkhuyag	99	97	92	90	97	96	571	20	
	Chuluunbadrakhyn Narantuyaa	96	99	93	94	95	96	573	17	
	Olzvoibaataryn Yanjinlkham	99	99	95	97	92	90	572	22	
5	Japan (JPN)	293	291	279	277	286	285	1711	69	
	Seiko Iwata	97	98	92	96	94	93	570	23	
	Maki Konomoto	98	99	96	92	97	96	578	24	
	Yuka Nakamura	98	94	91	89	95	96	563	22	
6	Kazakhstan (KAZ)	293	296	269	281	288	284	1711	58	
	Olga Dovgun	98	99	89	94	96	96	572	22	
	Alexandra Malinovskaya	97	97	91	92	97	95	569	22	
	Olessya Snegirevich	98	100	89	95	95	93	570	14	
7	Uzbekistan (UZB)	285	292	284	279	284	287	1711	56	
	Yana Fatkhi	91	97	96	92	94	91	561	13	
	Elena Kuznetsova	96	98	95	96	96	97	578	20	
	Sakina Mamedova	98	97	93	91	94	99	572	23	
8	Thailand (THA)	295	292	277	280	282	284	1710	59	
	Thanyalak Chotphibunsin	98	96	93	92	97	97	573	23	
	Sununta Majchacheep	98	97	92	91	94	95	567	16	
	Supamas Wankaew	99	99	92	97	91	92	570	20	
9	India (IND)	292	291	275	276	284	279	1697	47	
	Lajja Goswami	98	99	93	90	96	93	569	13	
	Chetanpreet Nilon	96	94	90	93	93	93	559	15	
	Tejaswini Sawant	98	98	92	93	95	93	569	19	
10	Malaysia (MAS)	286	287	275	280	284	278	1690	56	
	Nur Ayuni Farhana	96	92	95	93	95	92	563	15	
	Shahera Rahim Raja	93	96	89	91	95	90	554	15	
	Nur Suryani Taibi	97	99	91	96	94	96	573	26	
11	Singapore (SIN)	286	288	276	272	281	285	1688	48	
	Haw Siew Peng	93	94	90	89	92	93	551	11	
	Jasmine Ser	96	98	95	96	93	95	573	21	
	Aqilah Sudhir	97	96	91	87	96	97	564	16	
12	Bangladesh (BAN)	286	285	265	269	268	271	1644	30	
	Tripti Datta	96	94	90	91	89	90	550	11	
	Sarmin Shilpa	94	94	82	86	92	87	535	9	
	Sabrina Sultana	96	97	93	92	87	94	559	10	
