= Shooting at the 2018 Asian Games – Women's 50 metre rifle three positions =

Women's 50 metre rifle 3 positions at the 2018 Asian Games
- Venue: Jakabaring Shooting Range
- Dates: 22 August 2018
- Competitors: 33 from 18 nations

Medalists
gold medal	Gankhuyagiin Nandinzayaa	Mongolia
silver medal	Chuluunbadrakhyn Narantuya	Mongolia
bronze medal	Mahlagha Jambozorg	Iran

The women's 50 metre rifle three positions event at the 2018 Asian Games in Palembang, Indonesia took place on 21 August at the Jakabaring International Shooting Range.

== Schedule ==
All times are Western Indonesia Time (UTC+07:00)

Date	Time	Event
Wednesday, 22 August 2018	09:00	Qualification
Wednesday, 22 August 2018	13:30	Final

== Records ==
Prior to this competition, the existing world, Asian and Games records were as follows.

Qualification
World Record	Snježana Pejčić (CRO)	1180	Changwon, South Korea	26 April 2018
Asian Record	Anjum Moudgil (IND)	1180	Munich, Germany	26 May 2018
Games Record	—	—	—	—
Final
World Record	Petra Zublasing (ITA)	464.7	Baku, Azerbaijan	19 June 2015
Asian Record	Chang Jing (CHN)	463.3	Fort Benning, United States	17 May 2015
Games Record	Olga Dovgun (KAZ)	456.4	Incheon, South Korea	26 September 2014

== Results ==
=== Qualification ===
Rank	Athlete	Kneeling				Prone				Standing				Total	Xs	Notes
Rank	Athlete	1	2	3	4	1	2	3	4	1	2	3	4	Total	Xs	Notes
1	Gankhuyagiin Nandinzayaa (MGL)	98	99	98	96	99	98	100	98	99	95	95	100	1175	68	GR
2	Chuluunbadrakhyn Narantuya (MGL)	97	100	100	98	97	98	97	98	97	97	98	96	1173	62	
3	Jasmine Ser (SGP)	98	98	92	95	99	100	100	99	95	98	98	99	1171	64	
4	Elaheh Ahmadi (IRI)	97	99	95	95	98	97	97	96	98	97	97	97	1163	47	
5	Bae Sang-hee (KOR)	99	97	98	98	99	97	100	98	94	94	95	94	1163	42	
6	Mahlagha Jambozorg (IRI)	92	96	97	96	100	99	99	100	95	96	96	96	1162	50	
7	Jeong Mi-ra (KOR)	96	96	94	97	99	97	99	98	96	94	96	99	1161	45	
8	Martina Veloso (SGP)	98	93	97	96	96	99	99	98	95	97	98	94	1160	46	
9	Anjum Moudgil (IND)	97	98	99	98	98	100	99	97	93	92	93	95	1159	54	
10	Alexandra Malinovskaya (KAZ)	96	97	98	94	100	99	99	96	94	93	98	93	1157	44	
11	Ayano Shimizu (JPN)	97	96	95	94	99	98	100	98	95	93	96	95	1156	48	
12	Ratchadaporn Plengsaengthon (THA)	98	99	97	100	97	99	96	97	93	96	94	88	1154	47	
13	Zhang Binbin (CHN)	96	99	97	98	98	98	99	99	94	92	93	90	1153	45	
14	Violetta Starostina (KAZ)	96	93	97	96	95	100	99	99	96	94	91	93	1149	56	
15	Thanyalak Chotphibunsin (THA)	98	93	98	97	99	99	98	97	93	90	93	94	1149	43	
16	Mai Toishi (JPN)	96	97	98	96	99	98	100	96	92	91	95	90	1148	48	
17	Gaayathri Nithyanandam (IND)	97	97	95	94	97	99	97	100	95	93	93	91	1148	32	
18	Wang Zeru (CHN)	95	96	94	96	99	98	96	99	95	90	96	91	1145	49	
19	Safa Al-Doseri (BRN)	95	97	98	97	97	99	97	99	92	94	91	89	1145	34	
20	Elena Kuznetsova (UZB)	94	96	96	99	96	97	91	92	97	95	96	91	1140	31	
21	Nguyễn Thị Ngân (VIE)	92	94	98	94	96	95	97	97	94	93	95	94	1139	39	
22	Sakina Mamedova (UZB)	96	95	98	96	97	95	94	98	92	92	93	92	1138	32	
23	Nguyễn Huyền Trang (VIE)	95	91	94	97	97	95	92	97	92	97	94	96	1137	30	
24	Vidya Rafika Toyyiba (INA)	92	95	96	96	94	96	96	95	94	93	93	95	1135	29	
25	Suraiya Akhter (BAN)	95	95	95	90	96	95	94	97	93	95	91	94	1130	25	
26	Amparo Acuña (PHI)	97	92	93	94	97	94	96	98	88	93	94	93	1129	33	
27	Siham Al-Hasani (OMA)	92	92	96	97	95	97	97	94	93	93	90	92	1128	22	
28	Nadira Raees (PAK)	93	95	93	93	99	96	96	98	90	91	92	89	1125	38	
29	Sara Al-Doseri (BRN)	92	96	93	92	98	93	95	96	91	93	93	90	1122	25	
30	Amina Al-Tarshi (OMA)	90	90	92	87	96	99	96	95	92	94	92	90	1113	30	
31	Matara Al-Aseiri (QAT)	94	94	93	89	99	92	97	94	88	91	87	87	1105	23	
32	Maharani Ardy (INA)	91	93	98	94	95	98	93	95	80	84	89	90	1100	27	
33	Sarmin Shilpa (BAN)	94	94	91	89	94	94	97	92	79	91	92	90	1097	22	

=== Final ===
Rank	Athlete	Kneeling			Prone			Standing – Elimination							S-off	Notes
Rank	Athlete	1	2	3	1	2	3	1	2	3	4	5	6	7	S-off	Notes
1st place, gold medalist(s)	Gankhuyagiin Nandinzayaa (MGL)	50.8	101.4	152.1	203.7	254.7	306.3	356.2	407.6	417.5	428.1	437.9	448.5	458.8		GR
2nd place, silver medalist(s)	Chuluunbadrakhyn Narantuya (MGL)	49.8	100.8	152.3	202.5	254.0	304.6	353.2	402.9	412.5	422.1	432.6	441.3	451.4		
3rd place, bronze medalist(s)	Mahlagha Jambozorg (IRI)	50.1	101.0	151.2	201.7	253.1	304.1	352.8	403.1	413.3	422.9	432.0	441.2			
4	Jasmine Ser (SGP)	50.6	98.7	150.1	200.4	251.6	303.1	351.1	402.5	411.8	420.9	430.9				
5	Jeong Mi-ra (KOR)	50.4	100.5	152.3	203.9	255.1	305.6	353.1	401.0	409.8	420.0					
6	Bae Sang-hee (KOR)	50.3	100.5	150.9	201.7	252.0	303.7	351.0	400.7	409.7						
7	Elaheh Ahmadi (IRI)	48.2	97.6	148.5	200.7	251.8	302.0	352.9	400.6							
8	Martina Veloso (SGP)	48.5	96.8	145.4	196.8	247.2	299.1	347.5	397.2							
