= Shooting at the 2006 Asian Games – Women's 10 metre air rifle team =

Women's 10 metre air rifle team at the 2006 Asian Games
- Venue: Lusail Shooting Range
- Dates: 2 December 2006
- Competitors: 45 from 15 nations

Medalists
| gold medal | China; Du Li, Wu Liuxi, Zhao Yinghui |
| silver medal | Singapore; Adrienne Ser, Jasmine Ser, Vanessa Yong |
| bronze medal | India; Tejaswini Sawant, Suma Shirur, Avneet Sidhu |

The women's 10 metre air rifle team competition at the 2006 Asian Games in Doha, Qatar was held on 2 December at the Lusail Shooting Range.

== Schedule ==
All times are Arabia Standard Time (UTC+03:00)

| Date | Time | Event |
|---|---|---|
| Saturday, 2 December 2006 | 10:15 | Final |

== Records ==
Prior to this competition, the existing world, Asian and Games records were as follows.

| World Record | China | 1194 | Busan, South Korea | 8 July 2002 |
| Asian Record | China | 1194 | Busan, South Korea | 2 October 2002 |
| Games Record | China | 1194 | Busan, South Korea | 2 October 2002 |

== Results ==
| Rank | Team | Series | | | | Total | Notes |
| Rank | Team | 1 | 2 | 3 | 4 | Total | Notes |
|---|---|---|---|---|---|---|---|
| 1st place, gold medalist(s) | China (CHN) | 298 | 297 | 298 | 299 | 1192 | |
| | Du Li | 99 | 100 | 100 | 99 | 398 | |
| | Wu Liuxi | 99 | 99 | 99 | 100 | 397 | |
| | Zhao Yinghui | 100 | 98 | 99 | 100 | 397 | |
| 2nd place, silver medalist(s) | Singapore (SIN) | 294 | 296 | 296 | 297 | 1183 | |
| | Adrienne Ser | 98 | 98 | 98 | 99 | 393 | |
| | Jasmine Ser | 99 | 99 | 98 | 100 | 396 | |
| | Vanessa Yong | 97 | 99 | 100 | 98 | 394 | |
| 3rd place, bronze medalist(s) | India (IND) | 296 | 298 | 291 | 296 | 1181 | |
| | Tejaswini Sawant | 98 | 99 | 98 | 100 | 395 | |
| | Suma Shirur | 99 | 100 | 94 | 97 | 390 | |
| | Avneet Sidhu | 99 | 99 | 99 | 99 | 396 | |
| 4 | Mongolia (MGL) | 294 | 294 | 293 | 295 | 1176 | |
| | Zorigtyn Batkhuyag | 98 | 97 | 98 | 99 | 392 | |
| | Damdinsürengiin Lkhamsüren | 98 | 99 | 97 | 99 | 393 | |
| | Chuluunbadrakhyn Narantuyaa | 98 | 98 | 98 | 97 | 391 | |
| 5 | Thailand (THA) | 290 | 296 | 293 | 295 | 1174 | |
| | Thanyalak Chotphibunsin | 98 | 98 | 98 | 100 | 394 | |
| | Puchaya Pusuwan | 97 | 99 | 96 | 98 | 390 | |
| | Supamas Wankaew | 95 | 99 | 99 | 97 | 390 | |
| 6 | South Korea (KOR) | 289 | 295 | 297 | 293 | 1174 | |
| | Gu Su-ra | 98 | 99 | 99 | 97 | 393 | |
| | Lee Hye-jin | 96 | 98 | 100 | 97 | 391 | |
| | Na Yoon-kyung | 95 | 98 | 98 | 99 | 390 | |
| 7 | Uzbekistan (UZB) | 292 | 295 | 294 | 291 | 1172 | |
| | Yana Fatkhi | 97 | 99 | 99 | 98 | 393 | |
| | Elena Kuznetsova | 96 | 98 | 96 | 98 | 388 | |
| | Sakina Mamedova | 99 | 98 | 99 | 95 | 391 | |
| 8 | Kazakhstan (KAZ) | 288 | 294 | 294 | 294 | 1170 | |
| | Olga Dovgun | 99 | 99 | 100 | 99 | 397 | |
| | Galina Korchma | 95 | 99 | 99 | 95 | 388 | |
| | Varvara Kovalenko | 94 | 96 | 95 | 100 | 385 | |
| 9 | Kuwait (KUW) | 289 | 294 | 293 | 293 | 1169 | |
| | Adelah Al-Baghli | 95 | 98 | 96 | 98 | 387 | |
| | Maryam Arzouqi | 99 | 100 | 99 | 98 | 396 | |
| | Niran Arzouqi | 95 | 96 | 98 | 97 | 386 | |
| 10 | Malaysia (MAS) | 293 | 290 | 289 | 293 | 1165 | |
| | Cynthia Karen Leong | 96 | 99 | 97 | 95 | 387 | |
| | Nur Suryani Taibi | 99 | 94 | 95 | 99 | 387 | |
| | Muslifah Zulkifli | 98 | 97 | 97 | 99 | 391 | |
| 11 | Vietnam (VIE) | 287 | 287 | 290 | 290 | 1154 | |
| | Đàm Thị Nga | 91 | 95 | 96 | 96 | 378 | |
| | Nguyễn Thị Hòa | 97 | 94 | 96 | 96 | 383 | |
| | Thẩm Thúy Hồng | 99 | 98 | 98 | 98 | 393 | |
| 12 | Qatar (QAT) | 285 | 290 | 288 | 290 | 1153 | |
| | Mahbubeh Akhlaghi | 97 | 97 | 98 | 97 | 389 | |
| | Shaikha Al-Mohammed | 94 | 98 | 97 | 99 | 388 | |
| | Huda Al-Muntasr | 94 | 95 | 93 | 94 | 376 | |
| 13 | Bahrain (BRN) | 293 | 283 | 280 | 285 | 1141 | |
| | Ruqaya Al-Rowaiei | 99 | 98 | 91 | 96 | 384 | |
| | Aysha Suwaileh | 97 | 90 | 94 | 95 | 376 | |
| | Reema Abdulla Yusuf | 97 | 95 | 95 | 94 | 381 | |
| 14 | Nepal (NEP) | 279 | 288 | 290 | 280 | 1137 | |
| | Bhagawati Khari | 92 | 96 | 97 | 97 | 382 | |
| | Phool Maya Kyapchhaki | 91 | 96 | 97 | 96 | 380 | |
| | Asmita Rai | 96 | 96 | 96 | 87 | 375 | |
| 15 | Syria (SYR) | 284 | 283 | 285 | 281 | 1133 | |
| | Jehan Al-Magrabi | 96 | 95 | 96 | 95 | 382 | |
| | Rodaina Al-Magrabi | 94 | 90 | 92 | 88 | 364 | |
| | Raya Zeineddine | 94 | 98 | 97 | 98 | 387 | |
