= Hanieh Rostamian =

Iranian sport shooter (born 1998)

Personal information
- Born: September 11, 1998 (age 28) Tehran, Iran
- Years active: 2013–Present
- Height: 1.65 m (5 ft 5 in)
- Weight: 57 kg (126 lb)

Sport
- Country: Iran
- Sport: Shooting
- Events: AP60, SP
- Coached by: Mohsen Nasr Esfahani (National Team)
Medal record
Women's shooting
Representing Iran
Event	1st	2nd	3rd
World Championships	–	1	3
World Cup	1	1	1
Asian Games	–	–	2
Asian Championships	–	1	1
Islamic Solidarity Games	–	1	1
Universiade	–	1	2
Women's shooting
Representing Iran
World Championships
Silver medal – second place	2026 Doha	Air Pistol mixed team
Bronze medal – third place	2023 Baku	Air Pistol team
Bronze medal – third place	2022 Cairo	Air Pistol team
Bronze medal – third place	2022 Cairo	Air Pistol mixed team
World Cup
Gold medal – first place	2022 Rio de Janeiro	Air Pistol team
Silver medal – second place	2023 Baku	25m Pistol
Bronze medal – third place	2019 New Delhi	25m Pistol
Asian Games
Bronze medal – third place	2022 Hangzhou	Air Pistol mixed team
Bronze medal – third place	2026 Aichi–Nagoya	Air Pistol mixed team
Asian Championships
Silver medal – second place	2023 Changwon	25m Pistol
Bronze medal – third place	2025 Shymkent	Air Pistol mixed team
Islamic Solidarity Games
Silver medal – second place	2017 Baku	25m Pistol
Bronze medal – third place	2017 Baku	Air Pistol mixed team
Universiade
Silver medal – second place	2019 Naples	Air Pistol
Bronze medal – third place	2023 Chengdu	Air Pistol Team
Bronze medal – third place	2023 Chengdu	25m Pistol Team

Hanieh Rostamian (Persian: هانیه رستمیان, born 11 September 1998) is an Iranian sports shooter. She represented Iran at the 2020 Summer Olympics in the Women's 10 metre air pistol event, where she placed tenth, and in the 10 metre air pistol mixed team event, where her team placed fifth. She was also one of Iran's two flag bearers. She also won Iran's first quota for the 2024 Summer Olympics.

== Major achievements ==
Senior

- 2022 ISSF World Shooting Championships, Cairo – (bronze) (AP60 Team)
- 2022 ISSF World Shooting Championships, Cairo – (bronze) (AP60 Mixed)
- 2023 ISSF World Shooting Championships, Baku – (bronze) (AP60Team)
- 2022 Asian Games, Hangzhou – (bronze) (AP60 Mixed)
- 2022 ISSF World Cup, Rio de Janeiro – (gold) (AP60 team)
- 2023 ISSF World Cup, Baku -- (silver) (SP)
- 2023 Asian Shooting Championships, Changwon – (silver) (SP)
- 2019 ISSF World Cup, New Delhi – (bronze) (SP)
- 2019 Universiade, Naples – (silver) (AP60)
- 2023 Universiade, Chengdu – (bronze) (AP60 Team)
- 2023 universiade, Chengdu – (bronze) (SP Team)

Junior

- 2017 Asian Airgun Championships, Wako – (gold) (AP40 team)

Youth

- 2013 Asian Airgun Championships, Tehran – (silver) (AP40), (bronze) (AP40 team)
- 2014 Asian Airgun Championships, Kuwait City – (bronze) (AP40 team)
- 2015 Asian Airgun Championships, New Delhi – (gold) (AP40), (silver) (AP40 team)
- 2016 Asian Airgun Championships, Tehran – (bronze) (AP40 team)

Olympic Games
Preceded by Zahra Nemati	Flagbearer for Iran (with Samad Nikkhah Bahrami); Tokyo 2020	Succeeded by Mahdi Olfati; Neda Shahsavari
