= Najmeh Khedmati =

Iranian sport shooter (born 1996)

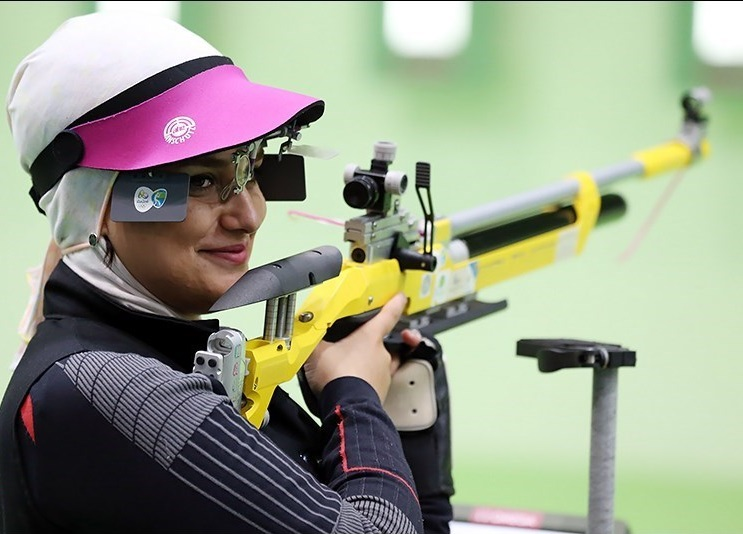

Personal information
- Born: June 9, 1996 (age 30) Birjand, South Khorasan, Iran
- Years active: 2010–Present
- Height: 1.58 m (5 ft 2 in)
- Weight: 57 kg (126 lb)

Sport
- Country: Iran
- Sport: Shooting
- Events: AR60, STR3X40
- Coached by: Elaleh Maghsoudi; Erfan Khedmati(Brother) (National Team)
Medal record
Event	1st	2nd	3rd
Asian Games	1	1	–
Asian Championships	–	–	2
World Cup	1	–	2
Universiade	2	1	3
Islamic Solidarity Games	1	1	–
World Junior Championships	–	1	–
Asian Junior Championships	6	3	1
Asian Youth Championships	1	2	2
Asian Games
Gold medal – first place	2014 Incheon	Air Rifle
Silver medal – second place	2014 Incheon	Air Rifle team
Asian Championships
Bronze medal – third place	2019 Doha	Air Rifle team
Asian Airgun Championships
Bronze medal – third place	2016 Tehran	Air Rifle team
Universiade
Gold medal – first place	2015 Gwangju	Air Rifle
Gold medal – first place	2019 Naples	Air Rifle mixed team
Silver medal – second place	2015 Gwangju	Rifle 3 Positions team
Bronze medal – third place	2015 Gwangju	Rifle 3 Positions
Bronze medal – third place	2015 Gwangju	Air Rifle team
Bronze medal – third place	2015 Gwangju	Rifle Prone team
Islamic Solidarity Games
Gold medal – first place	2017 Baku	Rifle 3 Positions
Silver medal – second place	2017 Baku	Air Rifle mixed team

Najmeh Khedmati (Persian: نجمه خدمتی, born June 9, 1996) is an Iranian female sport shooter. She qualified to represent Iran at the 2020 Summer Olympics in the women's 10 metre air rifle event.

== Major achievements ==
Senior

- 2014 Asian Games, Incheon – (gold) (AR40), (silver) (AR40 team)
- 2015 Universiade, Gwangju – (gold) (AR40), (silver) (STR3X20 team), (bronze) (STR3X20), (bronze) (AR40 team), (bronze) (STR60PR team)
- 2015 ISSF World Cup, Qabala – (bronze) (AR40)
- 2016 Asian Airgun Championships, Tehran – (bronze) (AR40 team)
- 2019 Universiade, Naples – (gold) (ARMIX)
- 2019 Asian Championships, Doha – (bronze) (AR60 team)

Junior

- 2014 World Championships, Granada – (silver) (AR40 team)
- 2013 Asian Airgun Championships, Tehran – (silver) (STR60PR team), (silver) (STR3X20 team)
- 2015 Asian Airgun Championships, New Delhi – (gold) (AR40), (gold) (AR40 team)
- 2015 Asian Championships, Kuwait City – (gold) (STR3X20), (gold) (AR40 team), (gold) (STR3X20 team), (gold) (STR60PR team), (bronze) (STR60PR)

Youth

- 2012 Asian Airgun Championships, Nanchang – (gold) (AR40)
- 2013 Asian Airgun Championships, Tehran – (silver) (AR40), (bronze) (AR40 team)
- 2014 Asian Airgun Championships, Kuwait City – (silver) (AR40), (bronze) (AR40 team)
