= 2011 Asian Airgun Championships =

International competition in Kuwait

- Host city: Kuwait City, Kuwait
- Dates: 17–23 October 2011
- Main venue: Kuwait Shooting Sport Club

The 2011 Asian Air Gun Championships were held in Kuwait City, Kuwait between October 17 and October 23, 2011.

== Medal summary ==
=== Men ===
Event	Gold	Silver	Bronze
10 m air pistol	Wu Xiao; China	Tan Zongliang; China	Omkar Singh; India
10 m air pistol team	China; Pang Wei; Tan Zongliang; Wu Xiao	India; Vijay Kumar; Om Prakash; Omkar Singh	Kazakhstan; Maxim Mazepa; Vyacheslav Podlesniy; Rashid Yunusmetov
10 m air rifle	Zhu Qinan; China	Abhinav Bindra; India	Satyendra Singh; India
10 m air rifle team	China; Liu Tianyou; Wang Tao; Zhu Qinan	India; Abhinav Bindra; Gagan Narang; Satyendra Singh	Iran; Mehdi Ahmadi; Hossein Bagheri; Saber Parasti

=== Women ===
Event	Gold	Silver	Bronze
10 m air pistol	Sun Qi; China	Fatemeh Hosseini; Iran	Huang Yi-ling; Chinese Taipei
10 m air pistol team	China; Chen Yan; Sun Qi; Tao Luna	India; Shweta Chaudhary; Annu Raj Singh; Harveen Srao	Iran; Nasim Hassanpour; Fatemeh Hosseini; Maryam Soltani
10 m air rifle	Narjes Emamgholinejad; Iran	Yi Siling; China	Wan Xiangyan; China
10 m air rifle team	China; Wan Xiangyan; Yi Siling; Zhang Yue	Singapore; Cheng Jian Huan; Li Yafei; Jasmine Ser	Iran; Elaheh Ahmadi; Narjes Emamgholinejad; Nesa Paryab

== Medal table ==
Rank	Nation	Gold	Silver	Bronze	Total
1	China	7	2	1	10
2	Iran	1	1	3	5
3	India	0	4	2	6
4	Singapore	0	1	0	1
5	Chinese Taipei	0	0	1	1
5	Kazakhstan	0	0	1	1
Totals (6 entries)		8	8	8	24
