= 2013 Asian Airgun Championships =

- Host city: Tehran, Iran
- Dates: 18–26 October 2013
- Main venue: Azadi Sport Complex

The 2013 Asian Airgun Championships along with 25 m and 50 m Rifle and Pistol were held at Azadi Sport Complex, Tehran, Iran between 18 and 26 October 2013.

== Medal summary ==
=== Men ===
Event	Gold	Silver	Bronze
10 m air pistol	Vladimir Issachenko; Kazakhstan	Wang Zhiwei; China	Ebrahim Barkhordari; Iran
10 m air pistol team	China; Liu Yi; Pang Wei; Wang Zhiwei	Iran; Mohammad Ahmadi; Ebrahim Barkhordari; Sepehr Saffari	India; Prakash Nanjappa; Amit Kumar Pilaniya; Jitu Rai
25 m standard pistol	Chen Kehan; China	Zhang Fusheng; China	Gurpreet Singh; India
25 m standard pistol team	China; Chen Kehan; Li Yuehong; Zhang Fusheng	India; Samaresh Jung; Gurpreet Singh; Harpreet Singh	Kazakhstan; Vladimir Issachenko; Vyacheslav Podlesniy; Sergey Vokhmyanin
50 m pistol	Mai Jiajie; China	Prakash Nanjappa; India	Pang Wei; China
50 m pistol team	China; Mai Jiajie; Pang Wei; Wang Zhiwei	India; Prakash Nanjappa; Om Prakash; Jitu Rai	Kazakhstan; Vladimir Issachenko; Vyacheslav Podlesniy; Rashid Yunusmetov
10 m air rifle	Yang Haoran; China	Pouria Norouzian; Iran	Cao Yifei; China
10 m air rifle team	China; Cao Yifei; Wang Tao; Yang Haoran	Iran; Hossein Bagheri; Mehdi Jafari Pouya; Pouria Norouzian	India; Sachin Chavan; Ravi Kumar; Sanjeev Rajput
50 m rifle prone	Sanjeev Rajput; India	Li Jiahong; China	Sushil Ghalay; India
50 m rifle prone team	India; Sushil Ghalay; Sanjeev Rajput; Satyendra Singh	China; Li Jiahong; Wang Jing; Zhao Shengbo	Kazakhstan; Ratmir Mindiyarov; Igor Pirekeyev; Alexandr Yermakov
50 m rifle 3 positions	Yuriy Yurkov; Kazakhstan	Kang Hongwei; China	Cao Yifei; China
50 m rifle 3 positions team	China; Cao Yifei; Kang Hongwei; Yang Haoran	India; Sanjeev Rajput; Surendra Singh Rathod; Satyendra Singh	Kazakhstan; Ratmir Mindiyarov; Igor Pirekeyev; Yuriy Yurkov

=== Women ===
Event	Gold	Silver	Bronze
10 m air pistol	Ji Xiaojing; China	Zhou Qingyuan; China	Su Yuling; China
10 m air pistol team	China; Ji Xiaojing; Su Yuling; Zhou Qingyuan	Iran; Behnaz Gholami; Elham Harijani; Fatemeh Hosseini	India; Shweta Chaudhary; Annu Raj Singh; Harveen Srao
25 m pistol	Tsogbadrakhyn Mönkhzul; Mongolia	Ji Xiaojing; China	Zhang Jingjing; China
25 m pistol team	China; Ji Xiaojing; Su Yuling; Zhang Jingjing	India; Surabhi Pathak; Rahi Sarnobat; Anisa Sayyed	Mongolia; Tömörchödöriin Bayarmaa; Tömörchödöriin Bayartsetseg; Tsogbadrakhyn Mönkhzul
10 m air rifle	Chang Jing; China	Wu Liuxi; China	Yi Siling; China
10 m air rifle team	China; Chang Jing; Wu Liuxi; Yi Siling	India; Apurvi Chandela; Pooja Ghatkar; Ayonika Paul	Iran; Narjes Emamgholinejad; Zahra Hashemi; Maryam Talebi
50 m rifle prone	Ratchadaporn Plengsaengthong; Thailand	Lajja Goswami; India	Yi Siling; China
50 m rifle prone team	China; Chang Jing; Wu Liuxi; Yi Siling	Thailand; Thanyalak Chotphibunsin; Vitchuda Pichitkanjanakul; Ratchadaporn Plengsaengthong	India; Raj Chaudhary; Lajja Goswami; Meena Kumari
50 m rifle 3 positions	Chang Jing; China	Wu Liuxi; China	Raj Chaudhary; India
50 m rifle 3 positions team	China; Chang Jing; Wu Liuxi; Yi Siling	India; Raj Chaudhary; Lajja Goswami; Meena Kumari	Mongolia; Gankhuyagiin Nandinzayaa; Chuluunbadrakhyn Narantuyaa; Olzvoibaataryn Yanjinlkham

== Medal table ==
Rank	Nation	Gold	Silver	Bronze	Total
1	China	16	9	7	32
2	India	2	8	7	17
3	Kazakhstan	2	0	4	6
4	Thailand	1	1	0	2
5	Mongolia	1	0	2	3
6	Iran	0	4	2	6
Totals (6 entries)		22	22	22	66
