= Shooting at the 2017 Islamic Solidarity Games =

Shooting competition

- Venue: Baku Shooting Centre
- Dates: 13–17 May

Shooting at the 2017 Islamic Solidarity Games was held in Baku Shooting Centre, Baku, Azerbaijan from 13 to 17 May 2017.

== Medal table ==
Rank	Nation	Gold	Silver	Bronze	Total
1	Azerbaijan (AZE)	6	3	1	10
2	Turkey (TUR)	4	5	4	13
3	Iran (IRI)	4	5	3	12
4	Qatar (QAT)	1	1	3	5
5	Bangladesh (BAN)	1	1	0	2
5	Egypt (EGY)	1	1	0	2
7	Bahrain (BHR)	1	0	0	1
7	Saudi Arabia (KSA)	1	0	0	1
9	Oman (OMA)	0	2	2	4
10	United Arab Emirates (UAE)	0	1	1	2
11	Pakistan (PAK)	0	0	2	2
11	Uzbekistan (UZB)	0	0	2	2
13	Tunisia (TUN)	0	0	1	1
Totals (13 entries)		19	19	19	57

== Medalists ==
=== Men ===
Event	Gold	Silver	Bronze
10 m air pistol	Ruslan Lunev; Azerbaijan	Yusuf Dikeç; Turkey	Muhammad Shehzad Akhtar; Pakistan
25 m center fire pistol	Ruslan Lunev; Azerbaijan	Yusuf Dikeç; Turkey	Muhammad Khalil Akhtar; Pakistan
25 m rapid fire pistol	Ruslan Lunev; Azerbaijan	Murat Kılıç; Turkey	Said Al-Hashmi; Oman
25 m standard pistol	Ruslan Lunev; Azerbaijan	Ahmad Zayed Al-Shamari; Qatar	Özgür Varlık; Turkey
50 m pistol	Yusuf Dikeç; Turkey	Ismail Al-Abri; Oman	Mohammad Ahmadi; Iran
10 m air rifle	Ömer Akgün; Turkey	Rabbi Hasan Munna; Bangladesh	Saidkhon Sayfuddinov; Uzbekistan
50 m rifle 3 positions	Pouria Norouzian; Iran	Hossein Bagheri; Iran	Hamed Al-Khatri; Oman
Trap	Ahmed Kamar; Egypt	Oğuzhan Tüzün; Turkey	Nasser Al-Hemaidi; Qatar
Skeet	Saeed Al-Mutairi; Saudi Arabia	Saeed Al-Maktoum; United Arab Emirates	Saif Bin Futtais; United Arab Emirates

=== Women ===
Event	Gold	Silver	Bronze
10 m air pistol	Golnoush Sebghatollahi; Iran	Afaf El-Hodhod; Egypt	Nigar Nasirova; Azerbaijan
25 m pistol	Al-Dana Al-Mubarak; Qatar	Hanieh Rostamian; Iran	Olfa Charni; Tunisia
10 m air rifle	Narjes Emamgholinejad; Iran	Elaheh Ahmadi; Iran	Sakina Mamedova; Uzbekistan
50 m rifle 3 positions	Najmeh Khedmati; Iran	Elaheh Ahmadi; Iran	Mahlagha Jambozorg; Iran
Trap	Nihan Gürer; Turkey	Shafag Amrahova; Azerbaijan	Kholoud Al-Khalaf; Qatar
Skeet	Nur Banu Özpak; Turkey	Nurlana Jafarova; Azerbaijan	İzel Aydın; Turkey

=== Mixed ===
Event	Gold	Silver	Bronze
10 m air pistol team	Azerbaijan; Ruslan Lunev; Nigar Nasirova	Oman; Ismail Al-Abri; Wadha Al-Balushi	Iran; Vahid Golkhandan; Hanieh Rostamian
10 m air rifle team	Bangladesh; Abdullah Hel Baki; Sayeda Atkia Hasan	Iran; Pouria Norouzian; Najmeh Khedmati	Turkey; Ömer Akgün; Şeymanur Koca
Trap team	Azerbaijan; Ali Huseyinli; Aydan Jamalova	Turkey; Oğuzhan Tüzün; Nihan Gürer	Qatar; Mohammed Ali Khejaim; Kholoud Al-Khalaf
Skeet team	Bahrain; Hasan Majed Mohamed; Maryam Hassani	Azerbaijan; Emin Jafarov; Nurlana Jafarova	Turkey; Salih Hafız; Nur Banu Özpak
