= Sneh Rana =

Sneh Rana can refer to:

- Sneh Rana (cricketer), Indian cricketer
- Sneh Rana (sport shooter), Nepalese sport shooter
