= 2016 Asian Airgun Championships =

Sport shooting Event

- Host city: Tehran, Iran
- Dates: 3–9 December 2016
- Main venue: Azadi Sport Complex

The 2016 Asian Airgun Championships were held at Azadi Sport Complex, Tehran, Iran between 3 and 9 December 2016.

== Medal summary ==
=== Men ===
Event	Gold	Silver	Bronze
10 m air pistol	Shahzar Rizvi; India	Jitu Rai; India	Wu Jiayu; China
10 m air pistol team	India; Om Prakash Mitharwal; Jitu Rai; Shahzar Rizvi	China; Pu Qifeng; Wu Jiayu; Zhang Jie	Kazakhstan; Maxim Mazepa; Dmitriy Suboch; Rashid Yunusmetov
10 m air rifle	Liu Yukun; China	Cao Yifei; China	Qian Xuechao; China
10 m air rifle team	China; Cao Yifei; Liu Yukun; Qian Xuechao	India; Imran Hassan Khan; Akhil Sheoran; Satyendra Singh	Thailand; Pongsaton Panyatong; Apichakli Ponglaokham; Napis Tortungpanich

=== Women ===
Event	Gold	Silver	Bronze
10 m air pistol	Zhang Mengxue; China	Lin Yuemei; China	Ruchita Vinerkar; India
10 m air pistol team	China; Li Shuyao; Lin Yuemei; Zhang Mengxue	Iran; Behnaz Gholami; Elham Harijani; Golnoush Sebghatollahi	Malaysia; Alia Sazana Azahari; Joseline Cheah; Bibiana Ng
10 m air rifle	Xu Hong; China	Du Bei; China	Shi Mengyao; China
10 m air rifle team	China; Du Bei; Shi Mengyao; Xu Hong	India; Anjum Moudgil; Shriyanka Sadangi; Suma Shirur	Iran; Narjes Emamgholinejad; Najmeh Khedmati; Nesa Paryab

== Medal table ==
Rank	Nation	Gold	Silver	Bronze	Total
1	China	6	4	3	13
2	India	2	3	1	6
3	Iran	0	1	1	2
4	Kazakhstan	0	0	1	1
4	Malaysia	0	0	1	1
4	Thailand	0	0	1	1
Totals (6 entries)		8	8	8	24
