= Ruchita Vinerkar =

Indian sport shooter

Ruchita Vinerkar is an Indian sport shooter. She won the Gold in the women’s 10m air pistol team event at the ISSF Shooting World Cup in Cairo.
