= 2015 Asian Airgun Championships =

Sport shooting competition in Asia

- Host city: New Delhi, India
- Dates: 25 September – 1 October 2015
- Main venue: Dr. Karni Singh Shooting Range

The 2015 Asian Airgun Championships were held at Dr. Karni Singh Shooting Range, New Delhi, India between 25 September and 1 October 2015.

== Medal summary ==
=== Men ===
Event	Gold	Silver	Bronze
10 m air pistol	Sepehr Saffari; Iran	Gurpreet Singh; India	Jitu Rai; India
10 m air pistol team	India; Gurpreet Singh; Omkar Singh; Jitu Rai	Kazakhstan; Vladimir Issachenko; Vyacheslav Podlesniy; Rashid Yunusmetov	Saudi Arabia; Atallah Al-Anazi; Aqeel Al-Badrani; Mohammed Al-Malki
10 m air rifle	Abhinav Bindra; India	Yuriy Yurkov; Kazakhstan	Yu Jae-chul; South Korea
10 m air rifle team	India; Abhinav Bindra; Gagan Narang; Chain Singh	South Korea; Kim Da-jin; Kim Tae-gon; Yu Jae-chul	Saudi Arabia; Mesfer Al-Ammari; Faiz Al-Anazi; Mubarak Al-Dawsari

=== Women ===
Event	Gold	Silver	Bronze
10 m air pistol	Heena Sidhu; India	Shweta Chaudhary; India	Kim Seon-a; South Korea
10 m air pistol team	India; Shweta Chaudhary; Yashaswini Singh Deswal; Heena Sidhu	Sri Lanka; Ruwani Abeymanne; Tharanga Dilrukshi; Amali Kulatunga	Hong Kong; Chik Yuen Shan; Lo Ka Kay; Shing Ho Ching
10 m air rifle	Jasmine Ser; Singapore	Elaheh Ahmadi; Iran	Ayonika Paul; India
10 m air rifle team	Iran; Elaheh Ahmadi; Narjes Emamgholinejad; Mahlagha Jambozorg	India; Apurvi Chandela; Pooja Ghatkar; Ayonika Paul	South Korea; Kim Bo-min; Lee Hye-jin; Song Chae-won

== Medal table ==
Rank	Nation	Gold	Silver	Bronze	Total
1	India	5	3	2	10
2	Iran	2	1	0	3
3	Singapore	1	0	0	1
4	Kazakhstan	0	2	0	2
5	South Korea	0	1	3	4
6	Sri Lanka	0	1	0	1
7	Saudi Arabia	0	0	2	2
8	Hong Kong	0	0	1	1
Totals (8 entries)		8	8	8	24
