= Narjes Emamgholinejad =

Iranian sport shooter (born 1984)

Personal information
- Full name: Narjes Emamgholinejad Andevari
- Born: July 5, 1984 (age 41) Amol, Mazandaran, Iran
- Education: Bachelor of Agriculture, Master of Physical Education, PHD student
- Years active: 2008–Present
- Height: 1.60 m (5 ft 3 in)
- Weight: 57 kg (126 lb)

Sport
- Country: Iran
- Sport: Shooting
- Events: AR40, STR3X20
- Turned pro: 2010
- Coached by: Laszlo Szucsak
Medal record
Event	1st	2nd	3rd
Asian Games	–	3	–
Asian Championships	2	1	5
Islamic Solidarity Games	1	–	–
Asian Games
Silver medal – second place	2010 Guangzhou	Air Rifle team
Silver medal – second place	2014 Incheon	Air Rifle
Silver medal – second place	2014 Incheon	Air Rifle team
Asian Championships
Silver medal – second place	2015 Kuwait City	Air Rifle team
Bronze medal – third place	2012 Doha	Air Rifle team
Bronze medal – third place	2015 Kuwait City	Air Rifle
Asian Airgun Championships
Gold medal – first place	2011 Kuwait City	Air Rifle
Gold medal – first place	2015 New Delhi	Air Rifle team
Bronze medal – third place	2011 Kuwait City	Air Rifle team
Bronze medal – third place	2013 Tehran	Air Rifle team
Bronze medal – third place	2016 Tehran	Air Rifle team
Islamic Solidarity Games
Gold medal – first place	2017 Baku	Air Rifle

Narjes Emamgholinejad (Persian: نرجس امامقلی‌نژاد, born 5 July 1984) is an Iranian female sport shooter. She earned a silver medal at the 2010 Asian Games in China and two silver medals at the 2014 Asian Games in South Korea.
