= Eum Bit-na =

South Korean sport shooter (born 1991)

Personal information
- Nationality: South Korean
- Born: 18 February 1991 (age 35)

Sport
- Country: South Korea
- Sport: Shooting
- Event: Air rifle
Medal record
World Championships
| Silver medal – second place | 2018 Changwon | 300 m team rifle prone |

Eum Bit-na (Korean: 음빛나; born 18 February 1991) is a South Korean sport shooter.

She participated at the 2018 ISSF World Shooting Championships, winning a medal.
