= Ýeketerina Arabowa =

Turkmenistan sport shooter (born 1983)

Yekaterina Arabova
Personal information
- Nationality: Turkmenistan
- Born: 10 August 1983 (age 43) Ashgabat, Turkmen SSR
- Height: 1.65 m (5 ft 5 in)
- Weight: 57 kg (126 lb)

Sport
- Sport: Shooting
- Event: 10 m air rifle

Yekaterina Arabova (born 10 August 1983 in Ashgabat) is a Turkmenistan sport shooter. Arabova represented Turkmenistan at the 2008 Summer Olympics in Beijing, where she competed for the women's 10 m air rifle. She placed last out of forty-seven shooters in the qualifying rounds, with a score of 376 points.
