= Sharmin Ratna =

Bangladeshi sports shooter

Personal information
- Born: 24 March 1988 (age 37); Magura, Bangladesh

Sport
- Sport: Sports shooting

Sharmin Ratna (Bengali: শারমিন রত্না; born 24 March 1988) is a Bangladeshi sports shooter. She competed in the Women's 10 metre air rifle event at the 2012 Summer Olympics. She competed in the same event at the 2014 Commonwealth Games, finishing 6th.
