= Sneh Rana (sport shooter) =

Nepalese sports shooter (born 1996)

Personal information
- Nationality: Nepali
- Born: Sneh Rajya Laxmi Rana; March 29, 1996 (age 30)
- Height: 1.58 m (5 ft 2 in)
- Weight: 55 kg (121 lb)

Sport
- Country: Nepal
- Sport: Shooting
- Event: 10 metre air rifle

Sneh Rajya Laxmi Rana (Nepali: स्नेह राज्य लक्ष्मी राणा; born 29 March 1996) is a Nepalese sports shooter who competed for her country in the 2012 Summer Olympics.
