= Jeong Mi-ra =

South Korean sports shooter (born 1987)

Personal information
- Nationality: South Korean
- Born: 16 February 1987 (age 39) Gyeongsangbuk, South Korea
- Height: 5 ft 8 in (1.73 m)
- Weight: 115 lb (52 kg)

Sport
- Sport: Sports shooting
- Coached by: Park Sang-Soon
Medal record
Women's shooting
Representing South Korea
Asian Championships
Gold medal – first place	2012 Doha	50 m rifle prone team
Silver medal – second place	2012 Doha	50 m rifle 3 positions team
Bronze medal – third place	2012 Doha	50 m rifle prone
Bronze medal – third place	2012 Doha	50 m rifle 3 positions

Jeong Mi-ra (born 16 February 1987) is a South Korean sports shooter. She competed in the Women's 10 metre air rifle and the women's 50 metre rifle three positions events at the 2012 Summer Olympics.
