= Tejaswini Sawant =

Indian sport shooter

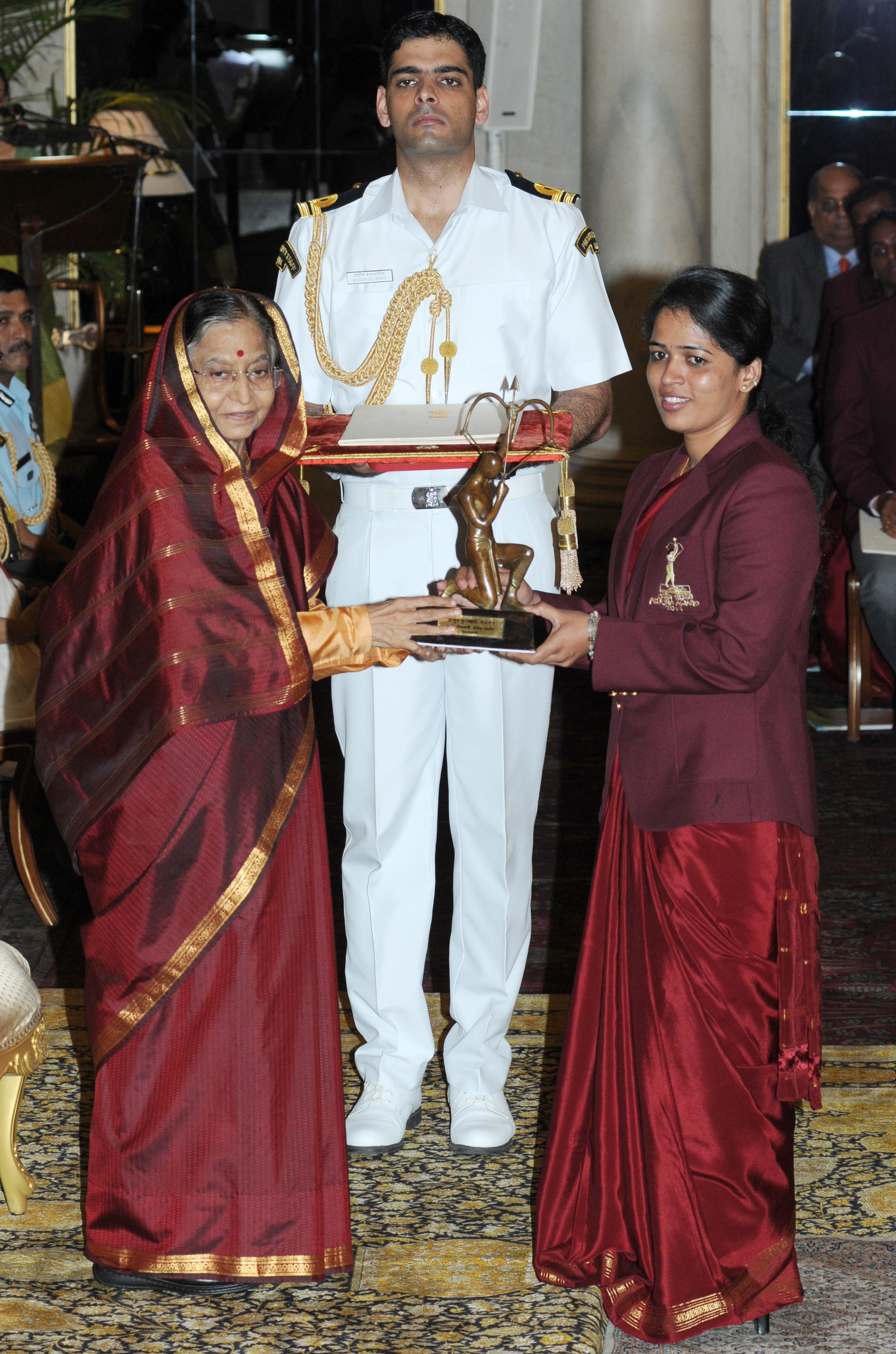
- Sawant, right, receiving the 2011 Arjuna Award in New Delhi

Personal information
- Nationality: Indian
- Born: Tejaswini Sawant; 12 September 1980 (age 45) Kolhapur, Maharashtra, India

Sport
- Country: India
- Sport: Shooting
- Event: Air rifle
Medal record
Women's shooting
Representing India
World Championships
Gold medal – first place	2010 Munich	50 m rifle prone
Asian Championships
Gold medal – first place	2019 Doha	50 m rifle prone team
Gold medal – first place	2026 New Delhi	50 m Rifle Prone Team
Bronze medal – third place	2012 Doha	50 m rifle prone team
Bronze medal – third place	2019 Doha	50 m rifle 3 positions team
World Cup
Bronze medal – third place	2009 Munich	50 m rifle 3 positions
Commonwealth Games
Gold medal – first place	2006 Melbourne	10 m air rifle pairs
Gold medal – first place	2006 Melbourne	10 m air rifle
Gold medal – first place	2018 Gold Coast	50 m rifle 3 positions
Silver medal – second place	2010 Delhi	50 m rifle 3 positions pairs
Silver medal – second place	2010 Delhi	50 m rifle prone
Silver medal – second place	2018 Gold Coast	50 m rifle prone
Bronze medal – third place	2010 Delhi	50 m rifle prone pairs

Tejaswini Sawant (born 12 September 1980) is an Indian shooter and Olympian from the Maharashtrian city of Kolhapur. In 2010 she became World Champion in the 50 metre prone rifle event.

== Biography ==
Tejaswini born to father Ravindra and mother Sunita in Kolhapur. She has two younger sisters Anuradha Pitre and Vijaymala Gavali. Her father Ravindra Sawant was in the Indian Navy. He died in February 2010. She started her practice under the coaching of Jaisingh Kusale in Kolhapur. She is training under her personal coach Kuheli Gangulee. Tejaswini was also appointed as officer on special duty (OSD) in the sports department. Tejaswini received the Arjuna award on 29 August 2011. Sawant married Sameer Darekar on 11 Feb 2016.

== Career ==
In 2010 in Munich, Sawant became the world champion in the 50m rifle prone event.

She earned a quota place for the 2020 Olympic Games in Tokyo after finishing fifth in the 2019 Asian Championships with a score of 1171.

Sawant represented India at the 9th South Asian Sports Federation Games in 2004 in Islamabad where she helped India win gold medal.

=== 2006 Commonwealth Games ===
She was selected to represent India at the 2006 Commonwealth Games ahead of Asian Games gold medallist Anjali Ved Pathak Bhagwat and world record holder Suma Shirur. In 2006, she won gold medals in Women's 10 m Air Rifle singles and Women's 10 m Air Rifle Pairs (with Avneet Kaur Sidhu) events at the Commonwealth Games at Melbourne.

=== ISSF World Cup and ISSF World Championships ===
Sawant won a bronze medal in 50 metre rifle three positions at the 2009 ISSF World Cup in Munich. On 8 August 2010 she became the World Champion in the 50m Rifle Prone event in Munich, Germany. She was the first Indian woman shooter to win a gold medal at the World Championships with a world-record equalling score in the 50 m Rifle Prone event.

=== 2010 Commonwealth Games ===
In the 2010 Commonwealth Games held in Delhi, Sawant won silver in Women's 50 rifle prone singles and bronze in Women's 50 m rifle prone pairs (along with Meena Kumari). She also won silver in Women's 50 m rifle 3 positions event (along with Lajjakumari Goswami) in this competition.

=== 2018 Commonwealth Games ===
On 12 April 2018, Tejaswini won Silver at Women's 50m Rifle Prone Finals with a cumulative score of 618.9.

On 13 April 2018, Tejaswini won gold at the Women's 50m Rifle 3 Position Finals. She set a Games Record (GR) with total points of 457.9.
