= Elena Kuznetsova =

Uzbekistani sport shooter (born 1982)

Personal information
- Nationality: Uzbekistan
- Born: 1 August 1982 (age 43)
- Height: 1.76 m (5 ft 9 1/2 in)
- Weight: 62 kg (137 lb)

Sport
- Sport: Shooting
- Event(s): 10 m air rifle (AR40); 50 m rifle 3 positions (STR3X20)
Medal record
Women's shooting
Representing Uzbekistan
Asian Championships
Gold medal – first place	2007 Kuwait City	50 m rifle 3 positions

Elena Kuznetsova (Uzbek: Елена Кузнецова; born 1 August 1982) is an Uzbekistani sport shooter. Kuznetsova represented Uzbekistan at the 2008 Summer Olympics in Beijing, where she competed for two rifle shooting events. She placed thirty-second out of forty-seven shooters in the women's 10 m air rifle, with a total score of 392 points. Nearly a week later, Kuznetsova competed for her second event, 50 m rifle 3 positions, where she was able to shoot 192 targets in a prone position, 191 in standing, and 190 in kneeling, for a total score of 573 points, finishing in thirtieth place.
