= Lajja Goswami =

Indian markswoman and policewoman (born 1988)

Medal record

Women's shooting

Representing India

Asian Championships
| Bronze medal – third place | 2012 Doha | 50 m rifle prone team |
| Bronze medal – third place | 2015 Kuwait City | 50 m rifle 3 positions team |

Lajja Goswami (born 28 September 1988) is an Indian markswoman and policewoman. She is a former National Cadet Corps (NCC) cadet. She won the conferred Raksha Mantri Medal in 2009. She also won the silver medal in women's 50-metre rifle 3 position event, at ISSF World Cup in Granada, Spain (2013). She is a brand ambassador for Gujarat State and became the first sportswoman to be appointed as a police inspector in the Gujarat Police cadre in the sports quota.

She has also participated in Asian Games 2014 and finished in Top 8. Since her childhood Lajja was interested in rifles and guns. While other children were playing with dolls and toys, Lajja played with guns. Thus she was different from other children.

Initially Lajja showed her talent in shooting as an NCC cadet. Then to sharpen the edge of her performance, she took coaching from Indian shooting academy, Pune and the coach Sunny Thomas trained her in shooting.

== Personal life ==
She hails from Jitodia, a small village located in Anand district of Gujarat. Lajja's father, Tilak Giri Goswami, is a care taker of an ancient Shiv temple named Baijanath Mahadev in Jitodia village. She lived in a small family of four members only her father, mother and a brother.

== Early childhood ==
Lajja's was a middle-class family. Tilak Giri, her father told media that while other children were playing with dolls and toys, Lajja played with guns. Her talent in shooting became focused when she got enrolled to the NCC as a cadet. She got training for shooting from coach, Sunny Thomas in Pune.

== Achievements and medals ==
| Game | Event | Place | Medal | Year |
|---|---|---|---|---|
| Commonwealth Games | 50 meter Rifle 3 Positions (Pair Event) | New Delhi (India) | Silver | 2010 |
| XI Sardar Sajjan Singh Sethi Memorial Masters Shooting Competition | 50 meter Rifle 3 Positions (Individual Event) | New Delhi (India) | Gold | 2012 |
| ISSF World Cup | 50 meter Rifle 3 Positions (Individual Event) | Granada (Spain) | Silver | 2013 |
| Commonwealth Games | 50 meter Rifle 3 Positions (Individual Event) | Glasgow (Scotland) | Bronze | 2014 |
| International Shooting Competition | 50 meter Rifle Prone (Individual Event) | Hannover (Germany) | Gold | 2015 |
