= Thanyalak Chotphibunsin =

Thai sport shooter (born 1990)

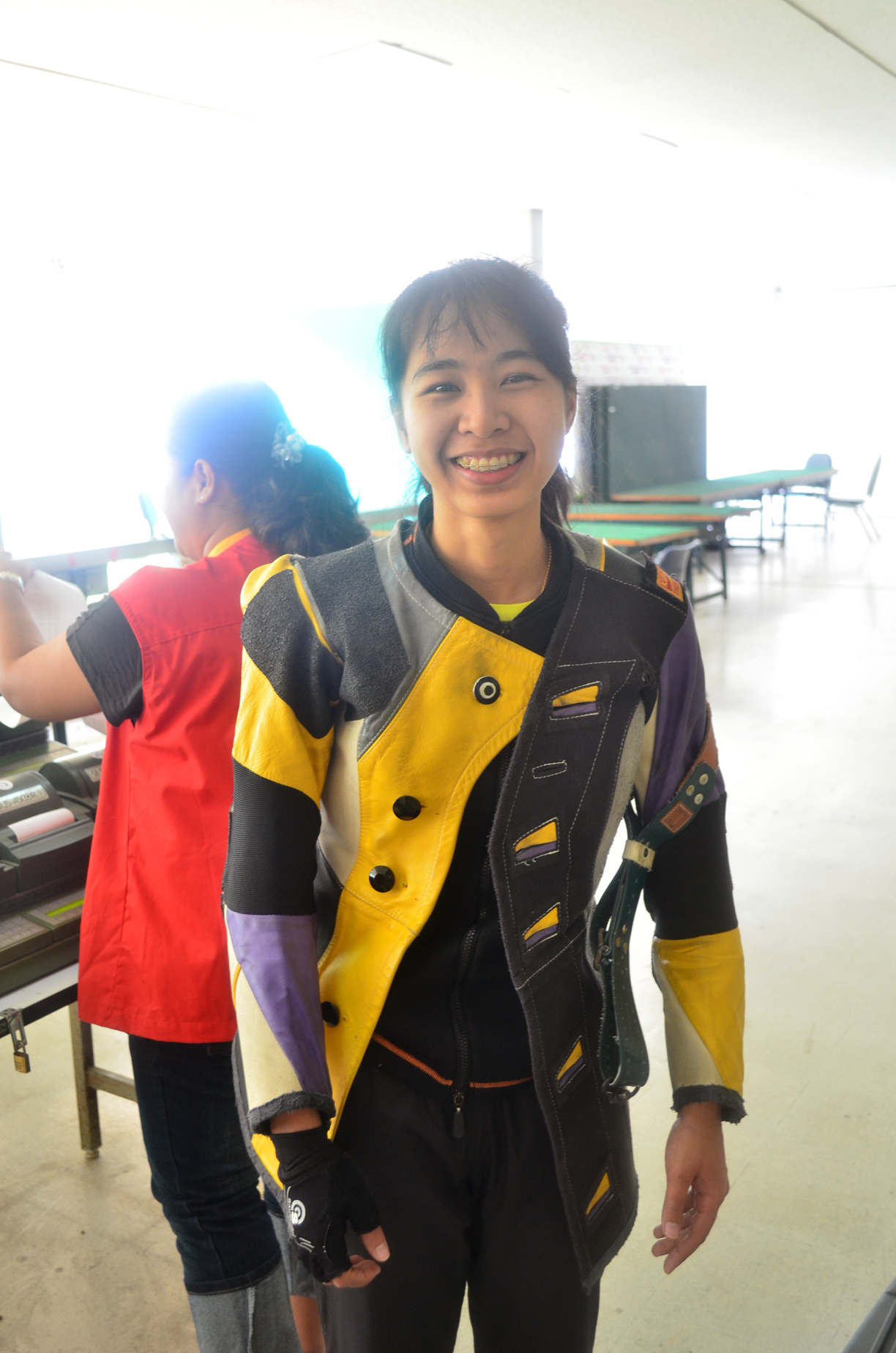
- Thanyalak Chotphibunsin

Personal information
- Nationality: Thailand
- Born: 19 November 1990 (age 35) Chiang Mai, Thailand
- Height: 1.59 m (5 ft 2 1/2 in)
- Weight: 47 kg (104 lb)

Sport
- Sport: Shooting
- Event(s): 10 m air rifle (AR40); 50 m rifle 3 positions (STR3X20)
Medal record
Women's shooting
Representing Thailand
Asian Airgun Championships
Bronze medal – third place	2021 Shymkent	10 m air rifle

Thanyalak Chotphibunsin (Thai: ธัญลักษณ์ โชติพิบูลศิลป์; born November 19, 1990) is a Thai sport shooter. Chotphibunsin represented Thailand at the 2008 Summer Olympics in Beijing, where she competed in two rifle shooting events, along with her teammate Sasithorn Hongprasert. She placed fortieth out of forty-seven shooters in the women's 10 m air rifle, with a total score of 388 points. Nearly a week later, Chotphibunsin competed for her second event, 50 m rifle 3 positions, where she was able to shoot 200 targets in a prone position, 178 in standing, and 191 in kneeling, for a total score of 569 points, finishing only in thirty-fifth place.
