= Gankhuyag Nandinzaya =

Mongolian sports shooter (born 1994)

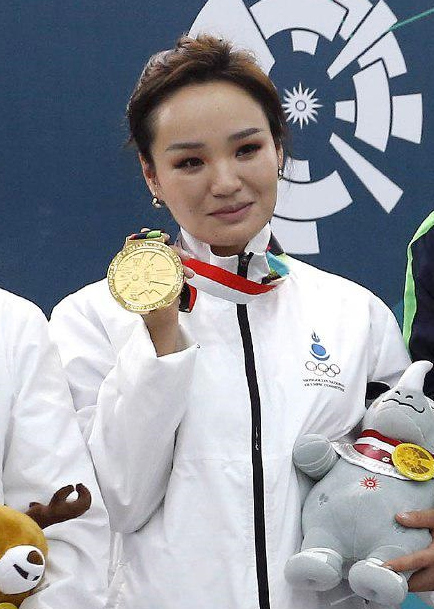
- Gankhuyag Nandinzaya at the 2018 Asian Games

Personal information
- Born: 27 June 1994 (age 32)
- Height: 159 cm (5 ft 3 in)
- Weight: 54 kg (119 lb)

Sport
- Sport: Sports shooting
Medal record
Women's shooting
Representing Mongolia
Asian Games
Gold medal – first place	2018 Jakarta-Palembang	50 m rifle 3 positions
Bronze medal – third place	2018 Jakarta-Palembang	10 m air rifle
Bronze medal – third place	2022 Hangzhou	10 m air rifle team

Gankhuyagiin Nandinzayaa (Mongolian: Ганхуягийн Нандинзаяа; born 27 June 1994) is a Mongolian sports shooter. She competed in the 50 m rifle 3 positions and 10 m air rifle events at the 2016 Summer Olympics and placed 9th and 14th, respectively. She won a gold and a bronze medal in these events at the 2018 Asian Games.

She took up shooting at age 13 following her father, Janchivdorj Gankhuyag, who was an international shooter and a shooting coach. She has a degree in international relations from the University of the Humanities, Ulaanbaatar.
