= Elaheh Ahmadi =

Iranian sport shooter (born 1982)

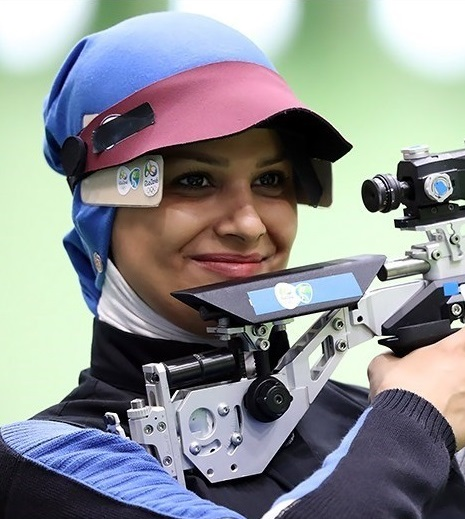

Personal information
- Born: May 31, 1982 (age 44) Tehran, Iran
- Education: Physical education at Islamic Azad University Central Tehran Branch
- Years active: 2002–present
- Height: 1.60 m (5 ft 3 in)
- Weight: 58 kg (128 lb)

Sport
- Country: Iran
- Sport: Shooting
- Events: AR40, STR3X20, STR60PR
- Club: Nirou Zamini Tehran (Army)
- Turned pro: 2004
- Coached by: Mostafa Ahmadi
Medal record
Event	1st	2nd	3rd
Asian Games	–	3	1
Asian Championships	1	3	3
World Cup	3	1	1
West Asian Games	–	1	–
Islamic Solidarity Games	–	2	–
World Cup
Gold medal – first place	2015 Munich	Air Rifle
Gold medal – first place	2015 Qabala	Air Rifle
Gold medal – first place	2018 Munich	Rifle 3 Positions
Silver medal – second place	2011 Sydney	Air Rifle
Bronze medal – third place	2010 Beijing	Air Rifle
Asian Games
Silver medal – second place	2010 Guangzhou	Rifle 3 Positions
Silver medal – second place	2010 Guangzhou	Air Rifle team
Silver medal – second place	2014 Incheon	Air Rifle team
Bronze medal – third place	2010 Guangzhou	Rifle 3 Positions team
Asian Championships
Silver medal – second place	2015 Kuwait City	Air Rifle team
Silver medal – second place	2019 Doha	Rifle 3 Positions team
Bronze medal – third place	2012 Doha	Air Rifle team
Asian Airgun Championships
Gold medal – first place	2015 New Delhi	Air Rifle team
Silver medal – second place	2015 New Delhi	Air Rifle
Bronze medal – third place	2011 Kuwait City	Air Rifle team
Bronze medal – third place	2012 Nanching	Air Rifle team
West Asian Games
Silver medal – second place	2005 Doha	Air Rifle
Islamic Solidarity Games
Silver medal – second place	2017 Baku	Air Rifle
Silver medal – second place	2017 Baku	Rifle 3 Positions

Elaheh Ahmadi (Persian: الهه احمدی, born May 31, 1982, in Tehran) is an Iranian sport shooter. At the 2012 Summer Olympics, she reached the final in the women's 10 metre air rifle and also competed in the 50 metre rifle 3 positions.

== Major achievements ==
- Bronze – 2010 ISSF World Cup, Beijing, China – 50 m rifle 3 positions
- Silver – 2010 Asian Games, Guangzhou, China – 50 m rifle 3 positions
- Silver – 2011 ISSF World Cup, Sydney, Australia – 10 m air rifle
- Gold – 2015 ISSF World Cup, Qabala, Azerbaijan – 10 m air rifle
- Gold – 2015 ISSF World Cup Final, Munich, Germany – 10 m air rifle
- Gold – 2018 ISSF World Cup, Munich, Germany – 50 m rifle 3 positions
