= Mahlagha Jambozorg =

Iranian sports shooter (born 1991)

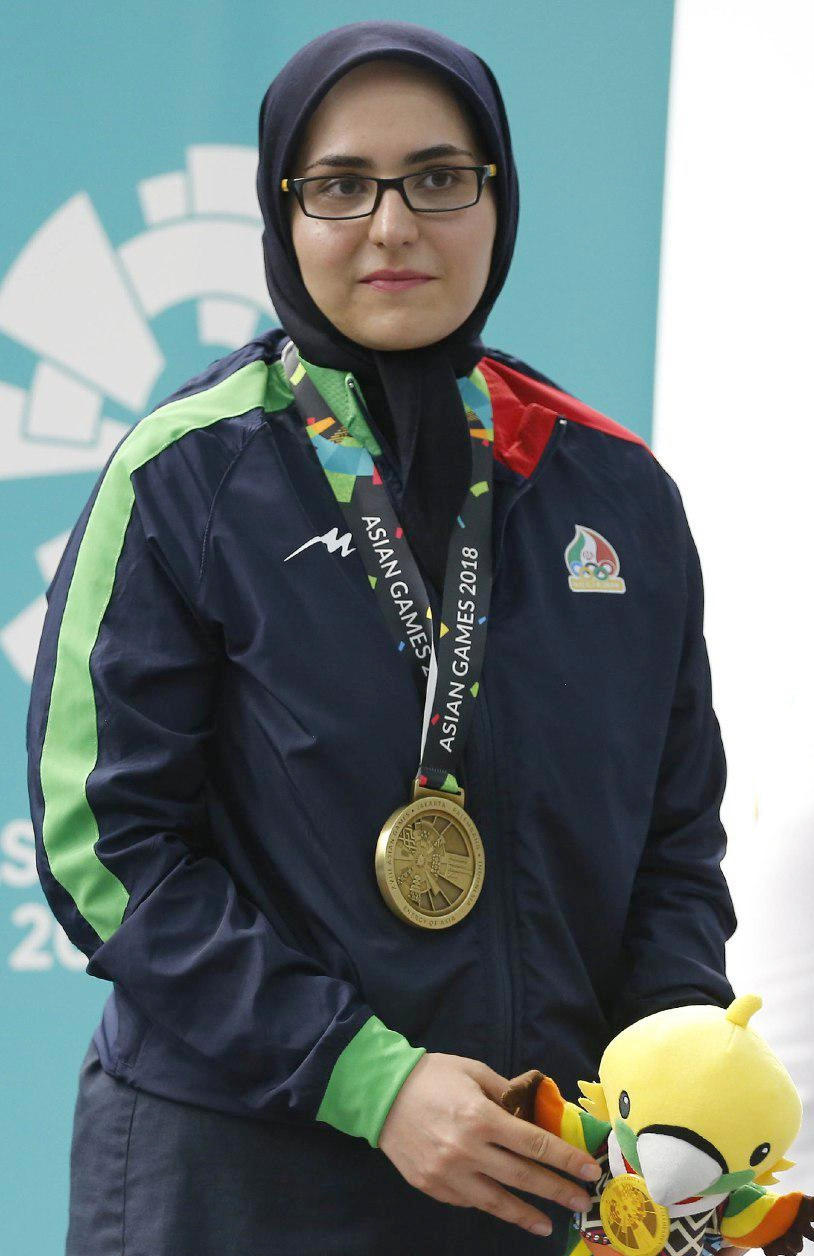
- Jambozorg at the 2018 Asian Games

Personal information
- Born: 15 August 1991 (age 34) Hamadan, Iran
- Height: 1.69 m (5 ft 7 in)
- Weight: 80 kg (176 lb)

Sport
- Sport: Sports shooting
- Coached by: Lazlo Szucsak; Elham Hashemi; Goran Maksimović
Medal record
Representing Iran
Asian Games
Silver medal – second place	2010 Guangzhou	Air Rifle team
Bronze medal – third place	2010 Guangzhou	Rifle 3 Positions team
Bronze medal – third place	2018 Jakarta–Palembang	Rifle 3 Positions
Asian Championships
Silver medal – second place	2015 Kuwait City	Air Rifle team
Silver medal – second place	2019 Doha	Rifle 3 Positions team
Asian Airgun Championships
Gold medal – first place	2015 New Delhi	Air Rifle team
Universiade
Gold medal – first place	2015 Gwangju	Rifle Prone
Silver medal – second place	2015 Gwangju	Rifle 3 Positions team
Bronze medal – third place	2015 Gwangju	Rifle Prone team
Bronze medal – third place	2015 Gwangju	Rifle Prone team
Islamic Solidarity Games
Bronze medal – third place	2017 Baku	Rifle 3 Positions

Mahlagha Jambozorg (Persian: مه‌لقا جام‌بزرگ, born 15 August 1991) is an Iranian sports shooter. She competed in the 10 m air rifle event at the 2012 Olympics and in the 50 m rifle 3 positions at the 2012 and 2016 Olympics with the best result of 14th place in the 50 m rifle in 2012. She won a bronze medal in this event at the 2018 Asian Games.

She was selected as the flag bearer for Iran at the 2017 Islamic Solidarity Games.
