= Bahiya al-Hamad =

Qatari sport shooter

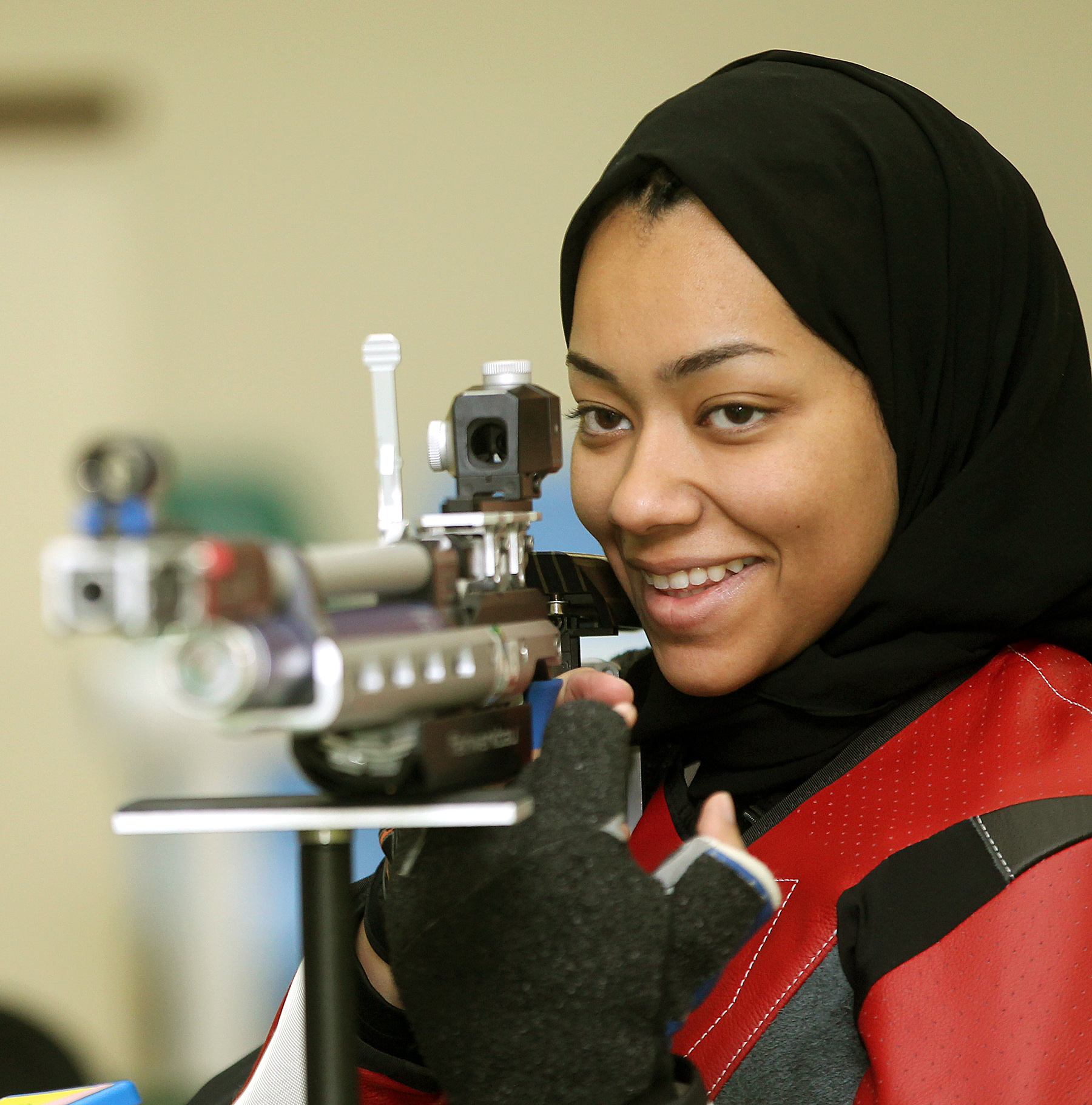
- Al-Hamad in 2012

Personal information
- Born: 21 June 1992 (age 34) Qatar
- Height: 166 cm (5 ft 5 in)
- Weight: 69 kg (152 lb)

Sport
- Sport: Rifle shooting
Medal record
Representing Qatar
Pan Arab Games
Gold medal – first place	2011 Doha	50 m rifle 3 positions
Silver medal – second place	2011 Doha	10 m air rifle

Bahiya Mansour al-Hamad (born 21 June 1992) is a rifle shooter from Qatar. She was named the Best Female Athlete of the Year 2011–2012 by the Qatar Olympic Committee (QOC). She qualified for the 2010 Youth Olympic Games, where she served as the flag bearer at the Opening Ceremony.

Al-Hamad made her Olympic debut in 2012. She was the first woman to represent Qatar at the Olympics. She placed 17th of 56 at the 10 m air rifle competition and served as the Olympic flag bearer for Qatar at the Opening Ceremony.
