= Nur Suryani Taibi =

Malaysian sports shooter

Nur Suryani Mohd Taibi
Personal information
- Nationality: Malaysian
- Born: Nur Suryani binti Mohamed Taibi; 24 September 1982 (age 43) Perak, Malaysia
- Height: 168 cm (5 ft 6 in)
- Weight: 60 kg (132 lb)

Sport
- Country: Malaysia
- Sport: Shooting
- Event: 10 metre air rifle
Medal record
Shooting
Representing Malaysia
Asian Games
Silver medal – second place	2014 Incheon	50 m prone rifle
Bronze medal – third place	2014 Incheon	50 m prone rifle team
Asian Championships
Bronze medal – third place	2007 Kuwait City	50 m rifle prone team
Bronze medal – third place	2012 Doha	50 m rifle 3 positions team
Bronze medal – third place	2019 Doha	50 m rifle prone
Commonwealth Games
Bronze medal – third place	2014 Glasgow	10 m air rifle
Southeast Asian Games
Gold medal – first place	2011 Palembang	10 m air rifle
Gold medal – first place	2011 Palembang	50 m rifle 3 position
Silver medal – second place	2015 Singapore	10 m air rifle team
Silver medal – second place	2015 Singapore	50 m rifle 3 positions team
Silver medal – second place	2015 Singapore	50 m rifle prone team
Bronze medal – third place	2013 Naypyidaw	50 m rifle prone team
Bronze medal – third place	2015 Singapore	50 m rifle 3 positions
Bronze medal – third place	2017 Kuala Lumpur	50 m rifle 3 positions

Nur Suryani Mohd Taibi (born 24 September 1982) is a Malaysian sports shooter. She competed in the Women's 10 metre air rifle event at the 2012 Summer Olympics. Taibi gained fame at the Games for being eight months pregnant. She did not advance beyond the qualification round.
