= Jasmine Ser =

Singaporean sports shooter

Personal information
- Full name: Jasmine Ser Xiang Wei
- Born: 24 September 1990 (age 35) Singapore

Sport
- Sport: Sports shooting
Medal record
Women's shooting
Representing Singapore
Commonwealth Games
Gold medal – first place	2010 Delhi	50 m rifle pairs
Gold medal – first place	2010 Delhi	10 m air rifle single
Gold medal – first place	2014 Glasgow	50 m rifle 3 positions single
Silver medal – second place	2010 Delhi	50 m rifle 3 positions single
Asian Games
Silver medal – second place	2006 Doha	10 m air rifle team
Southeast Asian Games
Gold medal – first place	2015 Singapore	10 m air rifle team
Gold medal – first place	2017 Kuala Lumpur	50 m rifle 3 positions
Silver medal – second place	2015 Singapore	10 m air rifle
Silver medal – second place	2015 Singapore	50 m rifle prone
Silver medal – second place	2015 Singapore	50 m rifle prone team
Silver medal – second place	2017 Kuala Lumpur	10 m air rifle
Bronze medal – third place	2015 Singapore	50 m rifle 3 positions team

Jasmine Ser Xiang Wei (born 24 September 1990) is a Singaporean sports shooter. She competed in the Women's 10 metre air rifle and the 50 metre rifle 3 positions events at the 2012 Summer Olympics. More recently, she won gold in the 50 meter rifle 3 positions category with a Games record at the 2014 Commonwealth Games in Glasgow. She previously won gold at the 2010 Commonwealth Games in the 10 air rifle, and silver in the 50 m rifle 3 positions and the 10 m air rifle pairs and the 50 m rifle pairs at the same Games. She also competed at the 2016 Summer Olympics. When she won silver at the 2006 Asian Games in the 10 m team air rifle event, her sister, Adrienne Ser, was part of the team.

Ser juggled her university studies while competing internationally. She graduated from the National University of Singapore in 2014.
