= Olga Dovgun =

Kazakhstani sports shooter (born 1970)

Personal information
- Born: 1 September 1970 (age 55) Chimkent, Kazakh SSR, Soviet Union

Sport
- Sport: Sports shooting
Medal record
Women's shooting
Representing Kazakhstan
World championships
Gold medal – first place	2002 Lahti	50 m rifle prone
Gold medal – first place	2006 Zagreb	50 m rifle prone
Silver medal – second place	2006 Zagreb	50 m rifle prone team
Bronze medal – third place	2006 Zagreb	10 m air rifle
Bronze medal – third place	2010 Munich	50 m rifle prone
Asian Games
Gold medal – first place	2006 Doha	50 m rifle prone
Silver medal – second place	1998 Bangkok	50 m rifle 3 positions
Silver medal – second place	2002 Busan	50 m rifle 3 positions
Silver medal – second place	2006 Doha	50 m rifle 3 positions
Silver medal – second place	2010 Guangzhou	50 m rifle prone
Bronze medal – third place	2002 Busan	50 m rifle 3 positions team
Bronze medal – third place	2002 Busan	50 m rifle prone team
Bronze medal – third place	2006 Doha	50 m rifle prone team
Bronze medal – third place	2006 Doha	50 m rifle 3 positions team
Bronze medal – third place	2006 Doha	10 m air rifle
Asian Championships
Gold medal – first place	2007 Kuwait City	50 m rifle prone
Silver medal – second place	2007 Kuwait City	50 m rifle prone team
Silver medal – second place	2007 Kuwait City	50 m rifle 3 positions team
Bronze medal – third place	2007 Kuwait City	50 m rifle 3 positions

Olga Dovgun (born 1 September 1970) is a Kazakhstani sports shooter. She competed at the 2000, 2004, 2008 and 2012 Summer Olympics.
