= Sakina Mamedova =

Uzbekistani sports shooter (born 1985)

Personal information
- Born: 13 December 1985 (age 40) Tashkent, Uzbekistan

Sport
- Sport: Sports shooting

Sakina Mamedova (born 13 December 1985) is an Uzbekistani sports shooter. She competed in the Women's 10 metre air rifle event at the 2012 Summer Olympics. She also competed in the Women's 50 metre rifle three positions event.
