= Khair Assembly constituency =

Constituency of the Uttar Pradesh legislative assembly in India

Khair
- Constituency No. 71 for the Uttar Pradesh Legislative Assembly

Constituency details
- Country: India
- Region: North India
- State: Uttar Pradesh
- District: Aligarh
- Lok Sabha constituency: Aligarh
- Total electors: 319,003 (2012)
- Reservation: SC

Member of Legislative Assembly
- 18th Uttar Pradesh Legislative Assembly
- Incumbent Surender Diler
- Party: BJP
- Elected year: 2024^

Khair Assembly constituency is one of the 403 constituencies of the Uttar Pradesh Legislative Assembly, India. It is a part of the Aligarh district and one of the five assembly constituencies in the Aligarh Lok Sabha constituency. First election in this assembly constituency was held in 1951 after the "DPACO (1951)" (delimitation order) was passed in 1951. After the "Delimitation of Parliamentary and Assembly Constituencies Order" was passed in 2008, the constituency was assigned identification number 71.

== Members of Legislative Assembly ==
Election	Assembly	Member	Party
1962	3rd Assembly	Chetanya Raj Singh	Swatantra Party
1967	4th Assembly	Piarey Lal	Indian National Congress
1969	5th Assembly	Mahendra Singh	Bharatiya Kranti Dal
1974	6th Assembly	Piarey Lal	Indian National Congress
1977	7th Assembly	Piarey Lal	Janata Party
1980	8th Assembly	Shivraj Singh	Indian National Congress (I)
1985	9th Assembly	Jagveer Singh	Lok Dal
1989	10th Assembly	Jagveer Singh	Janata Dal
1991	11th Assembly	Chd. Mahendra Singh	Bhartiya Janta Party
1993	12th Assembly	Jagveer Singh	Janata Dal
1996	13th Assembly	Gyan Wati	Bhartiya Janta Party
2002	14th Assembly	Pramod Gaur	Bahujan Samaj Party
2007	15th Assembly	Satpal Singh	Rashtriya Lok Dal
2012	16th Assembly	Bhagwati Prasad	Rashtriya Lok Dal
2017	17th Assembly	Anoop Pradhan	Bhartiya Janta Party
2022	18th Assembly	Anoop Pradhan	Bhartiya Janta Party
2024^	18th Assembly	Surender Diler	Bhartiya Janta Party

^ denotes bypoll

== Election results ==
=== 2027 ===
2027 Uttar Pradesh Legislative Assembly election: Khair
Party	Candidate	Votes	%	±%
INDIA				
NDA				
BSP				
NOTA	None of the above			
Majority				
Turnout				
gain from		Swing		

=== 2024 bypoll ===
Uttar Pradesh Legislative Assembly by-election, 2024: Khair
Party	Candidate	Votes	%	±%
BJP	Surender Diler	100,181	54.00	
SP	Charu Kain	61,788	33.31	
BSP	Pahal Singh	13,365	7.2	
ASP(KR)	Nitin Kumar Chotel	8,269	4.46	
NOTA	None of the Above	760	0.41	
Majority		38,393	20.69	
Turnout		1,85,506		
BJP hold		Swing		

=== 2022 ===
2022 Uttar Pradesh Legislative Assembly election: Khair
Party	Candidate	Votes	%	±%
BJP	Anoop Pradhan	139,643	55.55	▲2.04
BSP	Charu Kain	65,302	25.98	▲2.94
RLD	Bhagwati Prasad	41,644	16.57	▼1.48
NOTA	None of the above	1,454	0.58	▼0.14
Majority		74,341	29.57	▼0.9
Turnout		251,380	61.7	▼0.11
BJP gain from RLD		Swing		

=== 2017 ===
2017 Uttar Pradesh Legislative Assembly Election: Khair
Party	Candidate	Votes	%	±%
BJP	Anoop Pradhan	124,198	53.51	
BSP	Rakesh Kumar Maurya	53,477	23.04	
RLD	Ompal Singh	41,888	18.05	
SP	Prashant Kumar	7,496	3.23	
NOTA	None of the above	1,651	0.72	
Majority		70,721	30.47	
Turnout		232,118	61.81	

=== 2012 ===
2012 SC Elections: Khair
Party	Candidate	Votes	%	±%
RLD	Bhagwati Prasad	93,470	48.76	−
BSP	Rajrani Singh	54,696	28.53	−
BJP	Anoop Pradhan	26,609	13.88	−
	Remainder 06 candidates	16,910	8.82	−
Majority		38,774	20.23	−
Turnout		191,685	60.09	−
RLD gain from BSP		Swing		
