= Dwarakesh (swimmer) =

Indian Army officer and para swimmer (born 1989)

Personal information
- Born: 1989 (age 36–37)

Sport
- Country: India
- Event(s): Butterfly, Freestyle
- Coached by: Anjali Bhagwat
Medal record
Representing India
Men's Para-Swimming

Lieutenant Colonel Dwarakesh (born 1989) is an Indian Army officer, para swimmer and sport shooter, known as Army's only visually impaired active-duty officer. He earned a national medal in shooting and won gold medal and silver medal at the 23rd National Para Swimming Championships.

== Career ==
=== Military ===
Dwarakesh joined the Indian Army in 2009 through the Cadet Training Wing, opting for the Corps of Military Intelligence. His career in the military took a challenging turn in 2016 when a road accident resulted in the loss of his eyesight. After this life-changing event, he remained active in his military duties and continued to serve at the Station Headquarters in Khadki, Pune.

=== Sports ===
Dwarakesh's journey in parasports began in 2021, when he started training at the newly established paralympic node in the Bombay Engineering Group and Centre in Pune. His initial focus was on swimming.

In March 2024, Dwarakesh participated in the 23rd National Para Swimming Championships in Gwalior, Madhya Pradesh, organized by the Paralympic Committee of India. He won a gold medal in the 50m breaststroke with a time of 51 seconds and a silver medal in the 100m breaststroke, clocking 1 minute and 50 seconds.

Dwarakesh also made notable progress in shooting sports. In November 2023, he won a national medal in shooting, using infrared sensor-based equipment designed for visually impaired athletes. His training in shooting was guided by former Olympian Anjali Bhagwat.

With achievements in both the military and sports arenas, Dwarakesh was invited as a special guest to the Republic Day parade at Kartavya Path in Delhi.

== Achievements ==
- 2021: Scaled the Siachen Glacier.
- 2023: Won a medal in a national shooting competition.
- 2024: Secured gold in the 50m breaststroke and silver in the 100m breaststroke at the 23rd National Para Swimming Championships.

== See also ==
- Shooting sports in India
- Para swimming
