= Pawan Singh (disambiguation) =

Pawan Singh is an Indian playback singer, actor and musician.

Pawan Singh may also refer to:

- Pawan Singh (coach), Indian former rifle shooter and coach of the Indian shooting team
- Pawan Singh (politician), Indian politician from West Bengal
