= Bhagawatipur =

Bhagawatipur may refer to:

- Bhagawatipur, Janakpur, Nepal
- Bhagawatipur, Sagarmatha, Nepal

== See also ==
- Bhagwat (disambiguation)
- Bhagautipur or Bhagwatipur, a village in Budaun district, Uttar Pradesh, India
- Bhagwatipur, Ahmednagar, a village in Ahmednagar district, Maharashtra, India
- Bhagautipur, Lucknow, a village in Lucknow district, Uttar Pradesh, India
- Bhagwatipur, Mainpuri, a village in Mainpuri district, Uttar Pradesh, India
