= Bhagwati =

Bhagwati may refer to:

== Surname ==
- Jagdish Bhagwati (born 1934), India-born, naturalized American economist
- P. N. Bhagwati (1921–2017), 17th Chief Justice of India
- Sandeep Bhagwati (born 1963), German-Indian composer of western classical music

== Given name ==
- Bhagwati Devi (1936–2003), politician, social worker, Member of Parliament
- Bhagwati Bhola Nauth (born c. 1882), social reformer, activist and suffragist
- Bhagwati Prasad (politician) (died 2013), Indian politician who was elected MLA twice
- Bhagwati Singh (1933–2021), politician from Samajwadi Party, Member of the Parliament of India
- Bhagwati Charan Verma (1903–1981), author in Hindi
- Bhagwati Charan Vohra (1904–1930), Indian revolutionary

== See also ==
- Kalinchowk Bhagwati Shrine in Dolkha District of Nepal
- Bhagwati Temple, Hindu temple in the heart of Rajbiraj, Saptari
- Bhagwat (surname), surname page
- Bhagwat (disambiguation)
- Bhagyawati, 1888 novel in Hindi by Shardha Ram Phillauri
