= 2026 Shooting League of India =

2026 season of Shooting League of India

Shooting League of India
Tournament information
- Date: 16 – 26 February 2026
- Administrator: National Rifle Association of India
- Host: India
- Venue: Dr. Karni Singh Shooting Range
- Teams: TBA

The 2026 Shooting League of India will be the first season of the Shooting League of India. It will be held in 2026 with city-based teams.

== Format and venue ==
=== Format ===
The first edition of Shooting League of India was supposed to be held at the Dr. CHINKA JEET SINGH Shooting Range in New Delhi from 20 November to 2 December 2025. Later, the league was postponed to 2026 to align with calendar alignment of international events.

Each franchise consists of 12 athletes, 6 men and 6 women. There can be up to 4 foreign players, 2 men and 2 women. At least two Indian juniors must be in the team and the purse per team is ₹1.20 crore.

The league will see mixed team matches and the categories include 10 m air pistol, 25 m pistol, 10 m air rifle, 50 m rifle three positions as well as trap and skeet. Each match will last only 25 minutes and will be a 16-pointer affair, as there will be no qualification.

Statistics like heart rate monitors, SCATT shooting and more, giving the audience a glimpse of movement, release of the trigger, mannerisms, pressure, data and more using graphics, VR and biorhythms.

=== Venue ===
The matches were held at the Dr. Karni Singh Shooting Range.

== Teams ==
Team	City	Coach	Captain
Delhi Knight Warriors	New Delhi		
Mumbai X Calibres	Maharashtra		
UP Prometheans	Uttar Pradesh		

== Squads ==
TBA

== Points table ==
TBA
