= Bhagavata (disambiguation) =

Bhagavata may refer to:

- Bhagavata, a Vaishnava tradition
- Bhagavata Puranas (disambiguation)
  - Bhagavata Purana, a Hindu religious text in Sanskrit centred on Krishna
    - Bhagavat of Sankardev, Assamese-language adaptation of the Bhagavata Purana
  - Devi-Bhagavata Purana, a Hindu religious text in Sanskrit centred on the goddess Devi
- Bhagavad Gita, one of the major Hindu religious texts
- Bhagavata Mela, a dance form of Tamil Nadu, India
- Chaitanya Bhagavata, a hagiography of Chaitanya Mahaprabhu
- Bhagvat Singh, Indian maharaja of Gondal, Gujarat

== See also ==
- Bhagwat (disambiguation)
- Bhagavathar (disambiguation)
- Bhagavad Gita (disambiguation)
- Bhagavati, an honorific title for female deities in Hinduism
- Bhagwati, an Indian name
- Bhagavati Sutra or Vyākhyāprajñapti, a Jain text
- Bagavathi, a 2002 Indian Tamil-language action film
- Bagavathi Perumal (born 1978), Indian actor
