= Bhagwat =

Bhagwat may refer to:

- Bhagavata Purana, one of the Puranic texts of Hinduism
- Bhagwat (surname), a surname native to India
- Bhagwat Singh of Mewar, last Maharana of Udaipur, India from 1955 to 1971
- Bhagwat Chapter One: Raakshas, a 2025 Indian Hindi-language film

== See also ==
- Bhagavathar (disambiguation)
- Bhagavata (disambiguation)
- Bhagwati Prasad (disambiguation)
- Bhagwati, an Indian name
- Bhagwatpur, a village in Saran district in the Indian state of Bihar
- Bhagawatipur (disambiguation)
- Bhagawati Fort or Ratnagiri Fort, Maharashtra, fort in Ratnagiri, Maharashtra, India
- 21351 Bhagwat (1997 EC36), a Main-belt Asteroid discovered in 1997
- Madhavrao Bhagwat High School, a co-educational school located in a suburb of Mumbai, India
