= Pawan Singh (coach) =

Pawankumar Singh
- Occupations: Secretary General, National Rifle Association of India | Member, Judges Committee, ISSF | Olympic Jury | Former Rifle shooter and National coach
- Employer: The National Rifle Association of India (NRAI)
- Organization: Gun For Glory academy
- Title: Joint Secretary-General of the National Rifle Association of India; Chairman of ISSF's Result Timing Score (RTS) Jury
- Awards: 2019 Rashtriya Khel Protsahan Puraskar by the Ministry of Youth Affairs and Sports

Pawan Singh is a former Indian rifle shooter and shooting coach of the Indian shooting team. He is the first and only Indian shooting official to get elected as a member of the International Shooting Sport Federation's (ISSF) Judges Committee in the General Assembly elections held in Germany in 2018. He holds the post of the Joint Secretary-General of the National Rifle Association of India (NRAI).

== Career ==
Singh started as a shooter in 1995 and won medals at state and national championships. He coached the Indian shooting team between the year 2007 and 2012. Currently, he is serving as the Joint Secretary-General of the NRAI.

Pawan Singh was the Competitions Director in the 2017 ISSF World Cup held in New Delhi. He also represented India at the World Conference organised by the ISSF in 2017.

He contested for the ISSF elections and became the first Indian to get elected as a member of the ISSF Judged Committee. He was appointed as chairing of the Result Timing Score (RTS) Jury by the International Shooting Sport Federation for the 2019 ISSF World Cup in Munich in May 2018.

In December 2018, he became the first Indian to be elected one of seven members of the Judges Committee of the International Shooting Sport Federation (ISSF).

In April 2019, Singh was appointed as an ISSF Jury member to officiate at the 2020 Tokyo Games, being first Indian Shooting Jury to be selected for Olympics.

Singh has also worked as the Coordinator for the World Cup event which was held February 2017, Asian Olympic Qualifying Quota Competition and 8th Asian Airgun Championship. He was also the part of 'Jury Equipment Control' for Commonwealth Games, World Military Games and Commonwealth Youth Games.

In November 2017, he was also selected for the special instructors' workshop organised by the International Shooting Sport Federation, which was held in Munich, Germany.

Pawan Singh is also a co-founder of Pune-based Gun For Glory academy, which he started in 2011 with 2012 bronze medallist Gagan Narang.

== Awards ==
Pawan Singh along with Gagan Narang received the Rashtriya Khel Protsahan Puraskar from Ram Nath Kovind, the President of India at the Rashtrapati Bhavan in August 2019.
