= Anoop Pradhan =

Indian politician

Member of Parliament, Lok Sabha
- Incumbent
- Assumed office 04 June 2024
- Preceded by: Rajvir Singh Diler
- Constituency: Hathras

State Minister of Revenue, Government of Uttar Pradesh
- In office 25 March 2022 – 04 June 2024
- Governor: Anandiben Patel
- Chief Minister: Yogi Adityanath

Member of the Uttar Pradesh Legislative Assembly
- In office March 2017 – June 2024
- Preceded by: Bhagwati Prasad
- Succeeded by: Surender Diler
- Constituency: Khair

Personal details
- Born: 8 February 1981 (age 45) Village Rakarana, Uttar Pradesh, India
- Party: Bharatiya Janata Party
- Spouse: Lakshmi Pradhan (m. 2000)
- Children: 3
- Parent: Late Lahori Lal (father)
- Education: B.A.
- Profession: Agriculture
- Source

Anoop Pradhan (Hindi pronunciation: [ən̪uːp pɾəd̪ʱaːn̪]) is an Indian politician Serving Member of Parliament in Lok Sabha and Former State Minister of Revenue in Government of Uttar Pradesh. He is a Member of the Bharatiya Janata Party. He was a member of the Uttar Pradesh Legislative Assembly from the Khair constituency in Aligarh district.
