= Tulsipur (disambiguation) =

Tulsipur is a city in Uttar Pradesh, India.

Tulsipur may also refer to:

== Places in India ==
- Tulsipur, Mainpuri, a village in Uttar Pradesh

== Places in Nepal ==
- Tulsipur, Dang
- Tulsipur, Siraha

== Others ==
- Tulsipur State, a former principality based in the city of Tulsipur, India
- Tulsipur Assembly constituency, a constituency in the Uttar Pradesh Legislative Assembly centred on the city
- Tulsipur railway station, a train station in the city of Tulsipur, India

== See also ==
- Ocimum tenuiflorum, the tulsi plant
