= Sondra, Uttar Pradesh =

Village in Uttar Pradesh, India

Sondra
- Village
- Location in Uttar Pradesh, India
- Coordinates: 27.06128°N 78.84867°E
- Country: India
- State: Uttar Pradesh
- District: Mainpuri
- Tehsil: Karhal

Area
  - Total: 1.016 km^{2} (0.392 sq mi)

Population (2011)
  - Total: 1,005
  - Density: 989.2/km^{2} (2,562/sq mi)
- Time zone: UTC+5:30 (IST)

Sondra (Sondră) is a village in Barnahal block of Mainpuri district, Uttar Pradesh. As of 2011, it had a population of 1,005, in 164 households.

== Demographics ==
As of 2011, Sondra had a population of 1,005, in 164 households. This population was 53.3% male (536) and 46.7% female (469). The 0-6 age group numbered 133 (75 male and 58 female), or 13.2% of the total population. 30 residents were members of Scheduled Castes, or 3.0% of the total.

The 1961 census recorded Sondra as comprising 3 hamlets, with a total population of 417 people (223 male and 194 female), in 74 households and 45 physical houses. The area of the village was given as 252 acres.

== Infrastructure ==
As of 2011, Sondra had 1 primary school; it did not have any kind of healthcare facility. Drinking water was provided by hand pump and tube well; there were no public toilets. The village had a post office and public library, as well as at least some access to electricity for all purposes. Streets were made of a mix of both kachcha and pakka materials.
