= Alampur Deha =

Village in Uttar Pradesh, India

- Village
- Location in Uttar Pradesh, India
- Coordinates: 27.09346°N 78.79923°E
- Country: India
- State: Uttar Pradesh
- District: Mainpuri
- Tehsil: Karhal

Area
  - Total: 0.352 km^{2} (0.136 sq mi)

Population (2011)
  - Total: 1,153
  - Density: 3,280/km^{2} (8,480/sq mi)
- Time zone: UTC+5:30 (IST)

Alampur Deha (Ālampur Dehā) is a village in Barnahal block of Mainpuri district, Uttar Pradesh, India. As of 2011, it had a population of 1,153, in 215 households.

== Demographics ==
As of 2011, Alampur Deha had a population of 1,153, in 215 households. This population was 52.4% male (604) and 47.6% female (549). The 0-6 age group numbered 166 (86 male and 80 female), or 14.4% of the total population. 426 residents were members of Scheduled Castes, or 36.9% of the total.

The 1961 census recorded Alampur Deha as comprising 3 hamlets, with a total population of 586 people (316 male and 270 female), in 123 households and 77 physical houses. The area of the village was given as 408 acres.

== Infrastructure ==
As of 2011, Alampur Deha had 1 primary school; it did not have any kind of healthcare facility. Drinking water was provided by hand pump and tube well; there were no public toilets. The village had a post office, as well as at least some access to electricity for domestic and agricultural purposes. There was no public library. Streets were made of a mix of both kachcha and pakka materials.
