= Lakhanmau =

Village in Uttar Pradesh, India

- Village
- Location in Uttar Pradesh, India
- Coordinates: 27.04346°N 78.85099°E
- Country: India
- State: Uttar Pradesh
- District: Mainpuri
- Tehsil: Karhal

Area
  - Total: 5.260 km^{2} (2.031 sq mi)

Population (2011)
  - Total: 4,207
  - Density: 799.8/km^{2} (2,071/sq mi)
- Time zone: UTC+5:30 (IST)

Lakhanmau (Lakhanmaū) is a village in Barnahal block of Mainpuri district, Uttar Pradesh, India. As of 2011, it has a population of 4,207, in 733 households.

== Demographics ==
As of 2011, Lakhanmau had a population of 4,207, residing in 733 households. This population was 53.4% male (2,255) and 46.4% female (1,952). The 0-6 age group numbered 658 (356 male and 302 female), or 15.6% of the total population. 1,237 residents were members of Scheduled Castes, or 29.4% of the total.

The 1961 census recorded Lakhanmau as comprising 6 hamlets, with a total population of 1,799 people (849 male and 950 female), in 349 households and 239 physical houses. The area of the village was given as 1,299 acres.

== Infrastructure ==
As of 2011, Lakhanmau had one primary school and one primary health centre. Drinking water was supplied via hand pump and tube wells but there were no public toilets. The village had a post office and public library; there was at least some access to electricity for all purposes. The streets were made of both kachcha and pakka materials.
