= Balpura =

Village in Uttar Pradesh, India

- Village
- Location in Uttar Pradesh, India
- Coordinates: 27.13445°N 78.81279°E
- Country: India
- State: Uttar Pradesh
- District: Mainpuri
- Tehsil: Karhal

Area
  - Total: 2.658 km^{2} (1.026 sq mi)

Population (2011)
  - Total: 2,287
  - Density: 860.4/km^{2} (2,228/sq mi)
- Time zone: UTC+5:30 (IST)

Balpura (Balpurā) is a village in Barnahal block of Mainpuri district, Uttar Pradesh, India. As of 2011, it had a population of 2,287, in 408 households.

== Demographics ==
As of 2011, Balpura had a population of 2,287, in 408 households. This population was 54.6% male (1,248) and 45.4% female (1,039). The 0-6 age group numbered 369 (201 male and 168 female), or 16.1% of the total population. 306 residents were members of Scheduled Castes, or 13.4% of the total.

The 1981 census recorded Balpura as having a population of 1,295 people, in 194 households.

The 1961 census recorded Balpura as comprising 3 hamlets, with a total population of 875 people (467 male and 408 female), in 191 households and 111 physical houses. The area of the village was given as 646 acres.

== Infrastructure ==
As of 2011, Balpura had 1 primary school; it did not have any healthcare facilities. Drinking water was provided by tap and hand pump; there were no public toilets. The village had a post office and public library, as well as at least some access to electricity for all purposes. Streets were made of both kachcha and pakka materials.
