= Keshopur =

Village in Uttar Pradesh, India

- Village
- Location in Uttar Pradesh, India
- Coordinates: 27.07263°N 78.7794°E
- Country: India
- State: Uttar Pradesh
- District: Mainpuri
- Tehsil: Karhal

Area
  - Total: 2.669 km^{2} (1.031 sq mi)

Population (2011)
  - Total: 1,885
  - Density: 706.3/km^{2} (1,829/sq mi)
- Time zone: UTC+5:30 (IST)
- PIN: 205261

Keshopur Keśopur), also spelled Kesopur, is a village in Barnahal block of Mainpuri district, Uttar Pradesh, India. As of 2011, it had a population of 1,885, in 322 households.

== Demographics ==
As of 2011, Keshopur had a population of 1,885, in 322 households. This population was 52.4% male (987) and 47.6% female (898). The 0-6 age group numbered 298 (165 male and 133 female), or 15.8% of the total population. 584 residents were members of Scheduled Castes, or 31.0% of the total.

The 1961 census recorded Keshopur as comprising 1 hamlet, with a total population of 1,032 people (533 male and 499 female), in 172 households and 127 physical houses. The area of the village was given as 660 acres.

== Infrastructure ==
As of 2011, Keshopur had 1 primary school; it did not have any kind of healthcare facility. Drinking water was provided by well and hand pump; there were no public toilets. The village did not have a post office, as well as at least some access to electricity for all purposes. There was a public library. Streets were made of a mix of both kachcha and pakka materials.
