= Khushhalpur, Mainpuri =

Village in Uttar Pradesh, India

Khushhalpur
- Village
- Location in Uttar Pradesh, India
- Coordinates: 27.06158°N 78.80425°E
- Country: India
- State: Uttar Pradesh
- District: Mainpuri
- Tehsil: Karhal

Area
  - Total: 1.749 km^{2} (0.675 sq mi)

Population (2011)
  - Total: 1,078
  - Density: 616.4/km^{2} (1,596/sq mi)
- Time zone: UTC+5:30 (IST)
- PIN: 205261

Khushhalpur (Khuśhālpur) is a village in Barnahal block of Mainpuri district, Uttar Pradesh, India. As of 2011, it had a population of 1,078, in 179 households.

== Demographics ==
As of 2011, Khushhalpur had a population of 1,078, in 179 households. This population was 54.1% male (583) and 45.9% female (495). The 0-6 age group numbered 179 (109 male and 70 female), or 16.6% of the total population. 189 residents were members of Scheduled Castes, or 17.5% of the total.

The 1961 census recorded Khushhalpur as comprising 2 hamlets, with a total population of 505 people (272 male and 233 female), in 93 households and 72 physical houses. The area of the village was given as 435 acres.

== Infrastructure ==
As of 2011, Khushhalpur had 4 primary schools and 1 primary health centre. The village had a public library but no post office; there was at least some access to electricity for all purposes. Streets were made of both kachcha and pakka materials.
