= Bamtapur =

Village in Uttar Pradesh, India

- Village
- Location in Uttar Pradesh, India
- Coordinates: 27.07989°N 78.91849°E
- Country: India
- State: Uttar Pradesh
- District: Mainpuri
- Tehsil: Karhal

Area
  - Total: 5.100 km^{2} (1.969 sq mi)

Population (2011)
  - Total: 3,541
  - Density: 694.3/km^{2} (1,798/sq mi)
- Time zone: UTC+5:30 (IST)

Bamtapur (Bamtāpur) is a village in Barnahal block of Mainpuri district, Uttar Pradesh. As of 2011, it had a population of 3,541, in 597 households.

== Demographics ==
As of 2011, Bamtapur had a population of 3,541, in 597 households. This population was 52.7% male (1,867) and 47.3% female (1,674). The 0-6 age group numbered 510 (284 male and 226 female), or 14.4% of the total population. 1,165 residents were members of Scheduled Castes, or 32.9% of the total.

The 1961 census recorded Bamtapur as comprising 8 hamlets, with a total population of 1,530 people (845 male and 685 female), in 304 households and 255 physical houses. The area of the village was given as 1,260 acres and it had a post office at that point.

== Infrastructure ==
As of 2011, Bamtapur had 1 primary school and 1 primary health centre. Drinking water was provided by taps and hand pumps, but there were no public toilets. The village had a post office and public library, as well as at least some access to electricity for all purposes. Streets were made of both kachcha and pakka materials.
