= Sunupur =

Village in Uttar Pradesh, India

- Village
- Location in Uttar Pradesh, India
- Coordinates: 27.07129°N 78.88948°E
- Country: India
- State: Uttar Pradesh
- District: Mainpuri
- Tehsil: Karhal

Area
  - Total: 2.861 km^{2} (1.105 sq mi)

Population (2011)
  - Total: 1,139
  - Density: 398.1/km^{2} (1,031/sq mi)
- Time zone: UTC+5:30 (IST)

Sunupur (Sunupur) is a village in Barnahal block of Mainpuri district, Uttar Pradesh. As of 2011, it has a population of 1,139, in 193 households.

== Demographics ==
As of 2011, Sunupur had a population of 1,139, in 193 households. This population was 53.0% male (604) and 47.0% female (535). The 0-6 age group numbered 181 (96 male and 85 female), or 15.9% of the total population. 229 residents were members of Scheduled Castes, or 20.1% of the total.

The 1961 census recorded Sunupur as comprising 2 hamlets, with a total population of 512 people (299 male and 213 female), in 101 households and 73 physical houses. The area of the village was given as 712 acres.

== Infrastructure ==
As of 2011, Sunupur had 1 primary school; it did not have any kind of healthcare facility. Drinking water was provided by hand pump and tube well; there were no public toilets. The village had a post office and a public library, as well as at least some access to electricity for all purposes. Streets were made entirely of kachcha materials.
