= Mohanpur, Barnahal =

Village in Uttar Pradesh, India

Mohanpur
- Village
- Location in Uttar Pradesh, India
- Coordinates: 27.08179°N 78.86551°E
- Country: India
- State: Uttar Pradesh
- District: Mainpuri
- Tehsil: Karhal

Area
  - Total: 0.495 km^{2} (0.191 sq mi)

Population (2011)
  - Total: 321
  - Density: 648/km^{2} (1,680/sq mi)
- Time zone: UTC+5:30 (IST)
- PIN: 205261

Mohanpur (Mohanpur) is a village in Barnahal block of Mainpuri district, Uttar Pradesh. As of 2011, it has a population of 321, in 57 households.

== Demographics ==
As of 2011, Mohanpur had a population of 321, in 57 households. This population was 48.6% male (156) and 51.4% female (165). The 0-6 age group numbered 43 (22 male and 21 female), or 13.4% of the total population. 42 residents were members of Scheduled Castes, or 13.1% of the total.

The 1961 census recorded Mohanpur as comprising 1 hamlet, with a total population of 115 people (60 male and 55 female), in 24 households and 19 physical houses. The area of the village was given as 1,230 acres.

== Infrastructure ==
As of 2011, Mohanpur had 1 primary school; it did not have any kind of healthcare facility. Drinking water was provided by well and hand pump; there were no public toilets. The village had a post office, as well as at least some access to electricity for all purposes. There was no public library. Streets were made of a mix of both kachcha and pakka materials.
