= Masarpur =

Village in Uttar Pradesh, India

- Village
- Location in Uttar Pradesh, India
- Coordinates: 27.03945°N 78.892°E
- Country: India
- State: Uttar Pradesh
- District: Mainpuri
- Tehsil: Karhal

Area
  - Total: 4.907 km^{2} (1.895 sq mi)

Population (2011)
  - Total: 2,028
  - Density: 413.3/km^{2} (1,070/sq mi)
- Time zone: UTC+5:30 (IST)

Masarpur (Masarpur) is a village in Barnahal block of Mainpuri district, Uttar Pradesh, India. As of 2011, it had a population of 2,028, in 346 households.

== Demographics ==
As of 2011 census, Masarpur had a population of 2,028, in 346 households. This population was 53.7% male (1,090) and 46.3% female (938). The 0-6 age group numbered 315 (169 male and 146 female), or 15.5% of the total population. 338 residents were members of Scheduled Castes, or 16.7% of the total.

The 1981 census recorded Masarpur (as "Mansarpur") as having a population of 1,095 people, in 172 households.

The 1961 census recorded Masarpur (as "Mansarpur") as comprising 7 hamlets, with a total population of 645 people (336 male and 309 female), in 116 households and 86 physical houses. The area of the village was given as 1,213 acres.

== Infrastructure ==
As of 2011, Masarpur had four primary schools and one medical clinic and dispensary. Drinking water was provided by tap, hand pump, and tube well/borehole; there were no public toilets. The village had a post office and public library, as well as at least some access to electricity for all purposes. Streets were made of both kachcha and pakka materials.
