= Dhakpura =

Village in Uttar Pradesh, India

- Village
- Location in Uttar Pradesh, India
- Coordinates: 27.04736°N 78.88498°E
- Country: India
- State: Uttar Pradesh
- District: Mainpuri
- Tehsil: Karhal

Area
  - Total: 2.711 km^{2} (1.047 sq mi)

Population (2011)
  - Total: 969
  - Density: 357/km^{2} (926/sq mi)
- Time zone: UTC+5:30 (IST)

Dhakpura (Ḍhakpurā) is a village in Barnahal block of Mainpuri district, Uttar Pradesh, India. As of 2011, it had a population of 969, in 151 households.

== Demographics ==
As of 2011, Dhakpura had a population of 969, in 151 households. This population was 53.7% male (511) and 47.3% female (458). The 0-6 age group numbered 183 (97 male and 86 female), or 18.9% of the total population. 64 residents were members of Scheduled Castes, or 6.6% of the total.

The 1961 census recorded Dhakpura as comprising 2 hamlets, with a total population of 473 people (272 male and 201 female), in 97 households and 79 physical houses. The area of the village was given as 671 acres.

== Infrastructure ==
As of 2011, Dhakpura had 1 primary school; it did not have any kind of healthcare facility. Drinking water was provided by well and hand pump; there were no public toilets. The village had a post office, as well as at least some access to electricity for all purposes. There was no public library. Streets were made of both kachcha and pakka materials.
