= Agrapur =

Village in Uttar Pradesh, India

- Village
- Location in Uttar Pradesh, India
- Coordinates: 27.09198°N 78.91697°E
- Country: India
- State: Uttar Pradesh
- District: Mainpuri
- Tehsil: Karhal

Area
  - Total: 1.454 km^{2} (0.561 sq mi)

Population (2011)
  - Total: 880
  - Density: 610/km^{2} (1,600/sq mi)
- Time zone: UTC+5:30 (IST)

Agrapur (Agrāpur) is a village in Barnahal block of Mainpuri district, Uttar Pradesh, India. As of 2011, it had a population of 880, in 146 households.

== Demographics ==
As of 2011, Agrapur had a population of 880, in 146 households. This population was 54.0% male (475) and 46.0% female (405). The 0-6 age group numbered 117 (66 male and 51 female), or 13.3% of the total population. No residents were members of Scheduled Castes.

The 1981 census recorded Agrapur as having a population of 500 people, in 79 households.

The 1961 census recorded Agrapur as comprising 3 hamlets, with a total population of 316 people (180 male and 136 female), in 59 households and 22 physical houses. The area of the village was given as 398 acres.

== Infrastructure ==
As of 2011, Agrapur had 1 primary school; it did not have any healthcare facilities. Drinking water was provided by tap, hand pump, and tube well/borehole; there were no public toilets. The village had a public library but no post office; there was at least some access to electricity for all purposes. Streets were made of both kachcha and pakka materials.
