= Gondai =

Village in Uttar Pradesh, India

- Village
- Location in Uttar Pradesh, India
- Coordinates: 26.98284°N 78.82368°E
- Country: India
- State: Uttar Pradesh
- District: Mainpuri
- Tehsil: Karhal

Area
  - Total: 2.324 km^{2} (0.897 sq mi)

Population (2011)
  - Total: 987
  - Density: 425/km^{2} (1,100/sq mi)
- Time zone: UTC+5:30 (IST)

Gondai (Gondaī), also spelled Gaundai, is a village in Barnahal block of Mainpuri district, Uttar Pradesh, India. As of 2011, it had a population of 987, in 175 households.

== Demographics ==
As of 2011, Gondai had a population of 987, in 175 households. This population was 53.0% male (523) and 47.0% female (464). The 0-6 age group numbered 185 (99 male and 86 female), or 18.7% of the total population. 437 residents were members of Scheduled Castes, or 44.3% of the total.

The 1981 census recorded Gondai as having a population of 619 people, in 107 households.

The 1961 census recorded Gondai as comprising 1 hamlet, with a total population of 448 people (250 male and 198 female), in 90 households and 70 physical houses. The area of the village was given as 578 acres.

== Infrastructure ==
As of 2011, Gondai did not have any schools or healthcare facilities. Drinking water was provided by hand pump and tube well/borehole; there were no public toilets. The village had a post office and public library, as well as at least some access to electricity for all purposes. Streets were made of both kachcha and pakka materials.
