= Gopiyapur =

Village in Uttar Pradesh, India

- Village
- Location in Uttar Pradesh, India
- Coordinates: 27.04682°N 78.87537°E
- Country: India
- State: Uttar Pradesh
- District: Mainpuri
- Tehsil: Karhal

Area
  - Total: 1.430 km^{2} (0.552 sq mi)

Population (2011)
  - Total: 1,198
  - Density: 837.8/km^{2} (2,170/sq mi)
- Time zone: UTC+5:30 (IST)

Gopiyapur (Gopiyāpur) is a village in Barnahal block of Mainpuri district, Uttar Pradesh. As of 2011, it has a population of 1,198, in 182 households.

== Demographics ==
As of 2011, Gopiyapur had a population of 1,198, in 182 households. This population was 52.8% male (632) and 47.2% female (566). The 0-6 age group numbered 155 (81 male and 74 female), or 12.9% of the total population. 368 residents were members of Scheduled Castes, or 30.7% of the total.

The 1961 census recorded Gopiyapur as comprising 2 hamlets, with a total population of 437 people (232 male and 205 female), in 80 households and 52 physical houses. The area of the village was given as 364 acres.

== Infrastructure ==
As of 2011, Gopiyapur had 1 primary school; it did not have any kind of healthcare facility. Drinking water was provided by well and hand pump; there were no public toilets. The village had no post office or public library; there was at least some access to electricity for all purposes. Streets were made of both kachcha and pakka materials.
