= Jagannathpur, Mainpuri =

Village in Uttar Pradesh, India

Jagannathpur
- Village
- Location in Uttar Pradesh, India
- Coordinates: 27.02725°N 78.8483°E
- Country: India
- State: Uttar Pradesh
- District: Mainpuri
- Tehsil: Karhal

Area
  - Total: 3.824 km^{2} (1.476 sq mi)

Population (2011)
  - Total: 1,266
  - Density: 331.1/km^{2} (857.5/sq mi)
- Time zone: UTC+5:30 (IST)

Jagannathpur (Jagannāthpur) is a village in Barnahal block of Mainpuri district, Uttar Pradesh. As of 2011, it has a population of 1,266, in 210 households.

== Demographics ==
As of 2011, Jagannathpur had a population of 1,266, in 210 households. This population was 53.6% male (679) and 46.4% female (587). The 0-6 age group numbered 185 (99 male and 86 female), or 14.6% of the total population. 103 residents were members of Scheduled Castes, or 8.1% of the total.

The 1961 census recorded Jagannathpur as comprising 6 hamlets, with a total population of 452 people (241 male and 211 female), in 81 households and 65 physical houses. The area of the village was given as 945 acres.

== Infrastructure ==
As of 2011, Jagannathpur had 2 primary schools; it did not have any kind of healthcare facility. Drinking water was provided entirely by hand pump; there were no public toilets. The village had a post office and public library, as well as at least some access to electricity for all purposes.
