= Aima Hasannagar =

Village in Uttar Pradesh, India

- Village
- Location in Uttar Pradesh, India
- Coordinates: 27.0771°N 78.81444°E
- Country: India
- State: Uttar Pradesh
- District: Mainpuri
- Tehsil: Karhal

Area
  - Total: 0.574 km^{2} (0.222 sq mi)

Population (2011)
  - Total: 1,323
  - Density: 2,300/km^{2} (5,970/sq mi)
- Time zone: UTC+5:30 (IST)

Aima Hasannagar (Aimā Hasannagar) is a village in Barnahal block of Mainpuri district, Uttar Pradesh. As of 2011, it has a population of 1,323, in 223 households.

== Demographics ==
As of 2011, Aima Hasannagar had a population of 1,323, in 223 households. This population was 52.2% male (691) and 47.8% female (632). The 0-6 age group numbered 176 (87 male and 89 female), or 13.3% of the total population. 290 residents were members of Scheduled Castes, or 21.9% of the total.

The 1981 census recorded Aima Hasannagar (spelled "Aima Aasannagar") as having a population of 777 people, in 110 households.

The 1961 census recorded Aima Hasannagar as comprising 1 hamlet, with a total population of 466 people (243 male and 223 female), in 77 households and 56 physical houses. The area of the village was given as 170 acres.

== Infrastructure ==
As of 2011, Aima Hasannagar had 2 primary schools; it did not have any healthcare facilities. Drinking water was provided by hand pump and tube well/borehole; there were no public toilets. The village had a post office but no public library; there was at least some access to electricity for residential and agricultural (but not commercial) purposes. Streets were made of both kachcha and pakka materials.
