= Nagla Bhai Khan =

Village in Uttar Pradesh, India

- Village
- Location in Uttar Pradesh, India
- Coordinates: 27.09155°N 78.81642°E
- Country: India
- State: Uttar Pradesh
- District: Mainpuri
- Tehsil: Karhal

Area
  - Total: 0.534 km^{2} (0.206 sq mi)

Population (2011)
  - Total: 332
  - Density: 622/km^{2} (1,610/sq mi)
- Time zone: UTC+5:30 (IST)

Nagla Bhai Khan (Naglā Bhāī Khān) is a village in Barnahal block of Mainpuri district, Uttar Pradesh. As of 2011, it has a population of 332, in 61 households.

== Demographics ==
As of 2011, Nagla Bhai Khan had a population of 332, in 61 households. This population was 54.1% male (991) and 45.8% female (839). The 0-6 age group numbered 283 (142 male and 141 female), or 15.5% of the total population. 597 residents were members of Scheduled Castes, or 32.6% of the total.

The 1961 census recorded Nagla Bhai Khan as comprising 1 hamlet, with a total population of 207 people (110 male and 97 female), in 28 households and 28 physical houses. The area of the village was given as 1,430 acres.

== Infrastructure ==
As of 2011, Nagla Bhai Khan had 1 primary school; it did not have any kind of healthcare facility. Drinking water was provided by hand pump and tube well; there were no public toilets. The village had a post office, as well as at least some access to electricity for all purposes. There was no public library. Streets were made of a mix of both kachcha and pakka materials.
