= Kasoli, Mainpuri =

Village in Uttar Pradesh, India

Kasoli
- Village
- Location in Uttar Pradesh, India
- Coordinates: 27.04988°N 78.77589°E
- Country: India
- State: Uttar Pradesh
- District: Mainpuri
- Tehsil: Karhal

Area
  - Total: 1.310 km^{2} (0.506 sq mi)

Population (2011)
  - Total: 2,020
  - Density: 1,540/km^{2} (3,990/sq mi)
- Time zone: UTC+5:30 (IST)
- PIN: 205261

Kasoli (Kasolī) is a village in Barnahal block of Mainpuri district, Uttar Pradesh, India. As of 2011, it had a population of 2,020, in 349 households.

== Demographics ==
As of 2011, Kasoli had a population of 2,020, in 349 households. This population was 53.1% male (1,072) and 46.9% female (948). The 0-6 age group numbered 303 (155 male and 148 female), or 15.0% of the total population. 930 residents were members of Scheduled Castes, or 46.0% of the total.

The 1961 census recorded Kasoli (as "Kasauli") as comprising 2 hamlets, with a total population of 804 people (422 male and 382 female), in 154 households and 120 physical houses. The area of the village was given as 730 acres.

== Infrastructure ==
As of 2011, Kasoli had 1 primary school; it did not have any kind of healthcare facility. Drinking water was provided by well, hand pump, and tube well; there were no public toilets. The village had a post office and public library; there was at least some access to electricity for all purposes. Streets were made of both kachcha and pakka materials.
