= Bhagwati Prasad =

Bhagwati Prasad may refer to:

- Bhagwati Prasad (politician), Indian politician from Uttar Pradesh
- Bhagwati Prasad (judge), Indian judge
- Bhagwati Prasad Sagar, Indian politician
- Bhagwati Prasad Shukla, Indian politician
- Bhagwati Prasad Mishra, fictional character in the Indian film Hum Hain Rahi Pyaar Ke (1993), played by Mushtaq Khan

== See also ==
- Bhagwat (disambiguation)
