= Laungpur =

Village in Uttar Pradesh, India

- Village
- Location in Uttar Pradesh, India
- Coordinates: 27.05891°N 78.92234°E
- Country: India
- State: Uttar Pradesh
- District: Mainpuri
- Tehsil: Karhal

Area
  - Total: 2.588 km^{2} (0.999 sq mi)

Population (2011)
  - Total: 724
  - Density: 280/km^{2} (725/sq mi)
- Time zone: UTC+5:30 (IST)

Laungpur (Lauṅgpur), also spelled Longpur (Loṅgpur), is a village in Barnahal block of Mainpuri district, Uttar Pradesh. As of 2011, it hasd a population of 724, in 121 households.

== Demographics ==
As of 2011, Laungpur had a population of 724, in 121 households. This population was 53.9% male (390) and 46.1% female (334). The 0-6 age group numbered 108 (55 male and 53 female), or 14.9% of the total population. 235 residents were members of Scheduled Castes, or 32.5% of the total.

The 1981 census recorded Laungpur as having a population of 398 people, in 77 households.

The 1961 census recorded Laungpur as comprising 3 hamlets, with a total population of 317 people (173 male and 144 female), in 51 households and 31 physical houses. The area of the village was given as 646 acres.

== Infrastructure ==
As of 2011, Laungpur had 1 primary school; it did not have any healthcare facilities. Drinking water was provided by hand pump; there were no public toilets. The village did not have a post office or public library; there was at least some access to electricity for all purposes. Streets were made of both kachcha and pakka materials.
