= Jaitpur, Mainpuri =

Village in Uttar Pradesh, India

Jaitpur
- Village
- Location in Uttar Pradesh, India
- Coordinates: 27.06026°N 78.85794°E
- Country: India
- State: Uttar Pradesh
- District: Mainpuri
- Tehsil: Karhal

Area
  - Total: 1.760 km^{2} (0.680 sq mi)

Population (2011)
  - Total: 1,024
  - Density: 581.8/km^{2} (1,507/sq mi)
- Time zone: UTC+5:30 (IST)

Jaitpur (Jaitpur) is a village in Barnahal block of Mainpuri district, Uttar Pradesh. As of 2011, it has a population of 1,024, in 162 households.

== Demographics ==
As of 2011, Jaitpur had a population of 1,024, in 162 households. This population was 51.3% male (525) and 48.7% female (499). The 0-6 age group numbered 154 (74 male and 80 female), or 15.0% of the total population. 371 residents were members of Scheduled Castes, or 36.2% of the total.

The 1961 census recorded Jaitpur as comprising 3 hamlets, with a total population of 362 people (189 male and 173 female), in 65 households and 47 physical houses. The area of the village was given as 437 acres.

== Infrastructure ==
As of 2011, Jaitpur had 1 primary school; it did not have any kind of healthcare facility. Drinking water was provided by hand pump and tube well; there were no public toilets. The village had a post office, as well as at least some access to electricity for all purposes. There was no public library. Streets were made of a mix of both kachcha and pakka materials.
