= Kailashpur, Mainpuri =

Village in Uttar Pradesh, India

Kailashpur
- Village
- Location in Uttar Pradesh, India
- Coordinates: 27.02814°N 78.8255°E
- Country: India
- State: Uttar Pradesh
- District: Mainpuri
- Tehsil: Karhal

Area
  - Total: 2.853 km^{2} (1.102 sq mi)

Population (2011)
  - Total: 2,152
  - Density: 754.3/km^{2} (1,954/sq mi)
- Time zone: UTC+5:30 (IST)

Kailashpur, also spelled Kalashpur, is a village in Barnahal block of Mainpuri district, Uttar Pradesh, India. As of 2011, it had a population of 2,152, in 369 households.

== Demographics ==
As of 2011, Kailashpur had a population of 2,152, in 369 households. This population was 53.3% male (1,148) and 46.7% female (1,004). The 0-6 age group numbered 334 (164 male and 170 female), or 15.5% of the total population. 517 residents were members of Scheduled Castes, or 24.0% of the total.

The 1961 census recorded Kailashpur as comprising 3 hamlets, with a total population of 792 people (378 male and 324 female), in 113 households and 76 physical houses. The area of the village was given as 706 acres.

== Infrastructure ==
As of 2011, Kailashpur had 2 primary schools; it did not have any kind of healthcare facility. Drinking water was provided entirely by hand pump; there were no public toilets. The village had a post office and public library; there was at least some access to electricity for all purposes. Streets were made entirely of pakka materials.
