= Urthan =

Village in Uttar Pradesh, India

- Village
- Location in Uttar Pradesh, India
- Coordinates: 27.08195°N 78.94843°E
- Country: India
- State: Uttar Pradesh
- District: Mainpuri
- Tehsil: Karhal

Area
  - Total: 13.325 km^{2} (5.145 sq mi)

Population (2011)
  - Total: 6,696
  - Density: 502.5/km^{2} (1,302/sq mi)
- Time zone: UTC+5:30 (IST)
- PIN: 205264

Urthan (Urthān) is a village in Barnahal block of Mainpuri district, Uttar Pradesh. As of 2011, it has a population of 6,696, in 1,110 households.

== Demographics ==
As of 2011, Urthan had a population of 6,696, in 1,110 households. This population was 54.4% male (3,645) and 45.6% female (3,051). The 0-6 age group numbered 946 (519 male and 427 female), or 14.1% of the total population. 1,162 residents were members of Scheduled Castes, or 17.4% of the total.

The 1961 census recorded Urthan as comprising 14 hamlets, with a total population of 2,595 people (1,379 male and 1,216 female), in 480 households and 369 physical houses. The area of the village was given as 3,330 acres and it had a post office at that point.

== Infrastructure ==
As of 2011, Urthan had 4 primary schools and 1 primary health centre. Drinking water was provided by hand pump and tube well; there were no public toilets. The village had a post office and public library, as well as at least some access to electricity for all purposes. Streets were made of a mix of both kachcha and pakka materials.
