= Hajipur Nera =

Village in Uttar Pradesh, India

- Village
- Location in Uttar Pradesh, India
- Coordinates: 27.11083°N 78.83512°E
- Country: India
- State: Uttar Pradesh
- District: Mainpuri
- Tehsil: Karhal

Area
  - Total: 2.221 km^{2} (0.858 sq mi)

Population (2011)
  - Total: 2,789
  - Density: 1,256/km^{2} (3,252/sq mi)
- Time zone: UTC+5:30 (IST)

Hajipur Nera (Hājīpur Nerā) is a village in Barnahal block of Mainpuri district, Uttar Pradesh, India. As of 2011, it had a population of 2,789, in 441 households.

== Demographics ==
As of 2011, Hajipur Nera had a population of 2,789, in 441 households. This population was 53.4% male (1,489) and 46.6% female (1,300). The 0-6 age group numbered 425 (219 male and 206 female), or 15.2% of the total population. 325 residents were members of Scheduled Castes, or 11.7% of the total.

The 1961 census recorded Hajipur Nera as comprising 3 hamlets, with a total population of 1,210 people (635 male and 575 female), in 249 households and 219 physical houses. The area of the village was given as 582 acres.

== Infrastructure ==
As of 2011, Hajipur Nera had 1 primary school; it did not have any kind of healthcare facility. Drinking water was provided entirely by hand pump; there were no public toilets. The village had a post office, as well as at least some access to electricity for all purposes. There was no public library. Streets were made of a mix of both kachcha and pakka materials.
