= Dariyapur, Mainpuri =

Village in Uttar Pradesh, India

Dariyapur
- Village
- Location in Uttar Pradesh, India
- Coordinates: 27.03153°N 78.86853°E
- Country: India
- State: Uttar Pradesh
- District: Mainpuri
- Tehsil: Karhal

Area
  - Total: 0.876 km^{2} (0.338 sq mi)

Population (2011)
  - Total: 661
  - Density: 755/km^{2} (1,950/sq mi)
- Time zone: UTC+5:30 (IST)

Dariyapur (Dariyāpur) is a village in Barnahal block of Mainpuri district, Uttar Pradesh. As of 2011, it has a population of 661, in 125 households.

== Demographics ==
As of 2011, Dariyapur had a population of 661, in 125 households. This population was 54.3% male (359) and 45.7% female (302). The 0-6 age group numbered 78 (49 male and 29 female), or 11.8 of the total population. 23 residents were members of Scheduled Castes, or 3.5% of the total.

The 1961 census recorded Dariyapur as comprising 2 hamlets, with a total population of 368 people (193 male and 175 female), in 72 households and 53 physical houses. The area of the village was given as 219 acres.

== Infrastructure ==
As of 2011, Dariyapur had 1 primary school; it did not have any kind of healthcare facility. Drinking water was provided by hand pump and tube well; there were no public toilets. The village had a post office but no public library; there was at least some access to electricity for all purposes. Streets were made of both kachcha and pakka materials.
