= Mugalpur =

Village in Uttar Pradesh, India

- Village
- Location in Uttar Pradesh, India
- Coordinates: 27.07465°N 78.80082°E
- Country: India
- State: Uttar Pradesh
- District: Mainpuri
- Tehsil: Karhal

Area
  - Total: 1.764 km^{2} (0.681 sq mi)

Population (2011)
  - Total: 953
  - Density: 540/km^{2} (1,400/sq mi)
- Time zone: UTC+5:30 (IST)
- PIN: 205261

Mugalpur, also spelled Mughalpur, is a village in Barnahal block of Mainpuri district, Uttar Pradesh, India. As of 2011, it had a population of 953, in 129 households.

== Demographics ==
As of 2011, Mugalpur had a population of 953, in 129 households. This population was 54.6% male (520) and 45.4% female (433). The 0-6 age group numbered 144 (83 male and 61 female), or 15.1% of the total population. 479 residents were members of Scheduled Castes, or 50.3% of the total.

The 1981 census recorded Mugalpur as having a population of 529 people, in 81 households.

The 1961 census recorded Mugalpur as comprising 2 hamlets, with a total population of 306 people (178 male and 128 female), in 63 households and 30 physical houses. The area of the village was given as 436 acres.

== Infrastructure ==
As of 2011, Mugalpur had 1 primary school; it did not have any healthcare facilities. Drinking water was provided by well and hand pump; there were no public toilets. The village had a post office but no public library; there was at least some access to electricity for all purposes. Streets were made of both kachcha and pakka materials.
