= Shooting League of India =

Indian shooting league

- Current season, competition or edition: 2026 Shooting League of India
- Sport: Shooting
- Founded: 2025; 1 year ago
- First season: 2026
- Administrator: National Rifle Association of India
- Country: India
- Website: SLI

Shooting League of India, also known as SLI, is a proposed professional shooting sports league based in India. It is organized by National Rifle Association of India, the governing body for the sport in the nation. It is the first franchise-based shooting league in the world. The first edition will be held in 2026.

== History ==
The first edition of Shooting League of India was supposed to be held at the Dr. Karni Singh Shooting Range in New Delhi from 20 November to 2 December 2025. In October, the league was postponed to 2026 to fit the calendar alignment of international events. It is backed by the International Shooting Sport Federation.

400+ athletes from more than 20 countries, including Germany, Iran, Italy, Kazakhstan, United States and Australia applied for the league. The league will feature statistics using tools like heart rate monitors, SCATT shooting and more, giving the audience a glimpse of movement, pressure etc. The release of the trigger, mannerisms etc will be defined using data, graphics, VR as well as biorhythms.

== Format ==
The Shooting League of India features top shooters divided into franchise teams. The auction saw team owners bidding for players. Each franchise consists of 12 athletes, 6 men and 6 women. There can be up to 4 foreign players, 2 men and 2 women. At least two Indian juniors must be in the team and the purse per team is ₹1.20 crore.

The league will see mixed team matches and the categories include 10 m air pistol, 25 m pistol, 10 m air rifle, 50 m rifle three positions as well as trap and skeet. Each match will last only 25 minutes and will be a 16-pointer affair, as there will be no qualification.

== Teams ==
Team	State	Coach	Captain
Delhi Knight Warriors	Delhi		
Mumbai X Calibres	Maharashtra		
UP Prometheans	Uttar Pradesh		

== Editions and results ==
Season	Winner	Score	Runner up	Venue	Teams	Player Of The Tournament
2026	TBA	TBA	TBA	TBA	TBA	TBA

== Broadcasting ==
TBA

== See also ==
- Shooting sports in India
- Sport in India
