= Saj Hajipur =

Village in Uttar Pradesh, India

- Village
- Location in Uttar Pradesh, India
- Coordinates: 27.10365°N 78.92755°E
- Country: India
- State: Uttar Pradesh
- District: Mainpuri
- Tehsil: Karhal

Area
  - Total: 3.815 km^{2} (1.473 sq mi)

Population (2011)
  - Total: 2,417
  - Density: 633.6/km^{2} (1,641/sq mi)
- Time zone: UTC+5:30 (IST)

Saj Hajipur (Saj Hājīpur) is a village in Barnahal block of Mainpuri district, Uttar Pradesh, India. As of 2011, it had a population of 2,417, in 405 households.

== Geography ==
The only sizeable jhil in the Barnahal area is located at Saj Hajipur.

As of 2011, Saj Hajipur had a total land area of 381.5 hectares, of which 312.6 were currently farmland. 2.2 hectares were occupied by orchards, 1.2 by pastures, 2.4 were classified as cultivable but not currently under any agricultural use, and 63 were classified as non-cultivable. No forests existed on village lands.

== Demographics ==
As of 2011, Saj Hajipur had a population of 2,417, in 405 households. This population was 53.7% male (1,297) and 46.3% female (1,120). The 0-6 age group numbered 348 (174 male and 174 female), or 14.4% of the total population. 493 residents were members of Scheduled Castes, or 20.4% of the total.

The 1961 census recorded Saj Hajipur as comprising 5 hamlets, with a total population of 1,057 people (477 male and 580 female), in 212 households and 102 physical houses. The area of the village was given as 1,134 acres.

== Infrastructure ==
As of 2011, Saj Hajipur had 2 primary schools; it did not have any kind of healthcare facility. Drinking water was provided by tap and hand pump; there were no public toilets. The village had a post office and public library, as well as at least some access to electricity for all purposes. Streets were made of both kachcha and pakka materials.
