= Goliyapur =

Village in Uttar Pradesh, India

- Village
- Location in Uttar Pradesh, India
- Coordinates: 27.06544°N 78.85652°E
- Country: India
- State: Uttar Pradesh
- District: Mainpuri
- Tehsil: Karhal

Area
  - Total: 0.798 km^{2} (0.308 sq mi)

Population (2011)
  - Total: 748
  - Density: 937/km^{2} (2,430/sq mi)
- Time zone: UTC+5:30 (IST)

Goliyapur (Goliyāpur) is a village in Barnahal block of Mainpuri district, Uttar Pradesh, India. As of 2011, it had a population of 748, in 152 households.

== Demographics ==
As of 2011, Goliyapur had a population of 748, in 152 households. This population was 53.3% male (399) and 46.7% female (349). The 0-6 age group numbered 93 (57 male and 36 female), or 12.4% of the total population. 97 residents were members of Scheduled Castes, or 13.0% of the total.

The 1961 census recorded Goliyapur as comprising 1 hamlet, with a total population of 387 people (195 male and 192 female), in 66 households and 37 physical houses. The area of the village was given as 201 acres.

== Infrastructure ==
As of 2011, Goliyapur had 1 primary school; it did not have any kind of healthcare facility. Drinking water was provided by hand pump and tube well; there were no public toilets. The village had a public library, as well as at least some access to electricity for all purposes. There was no post office. Streets were made of a mix of both kachcha and pakka materials.
