= Barnahal =

Village in Uttar Pradesh, India

- Village
- Location in Uttar Pradesh, India
- Coordinates: 27.07654°N 78.83916°E
- Country: India
- State: Uttar Pradesh
- District: Mainpuri
- Tehsil: Karhal

Area
  - Total: 6.358 km^{2} (2.455 sq mi)

Population (2011)
  - Total: 10,203
  - Density: 1,605/km^{2} (4,156/sq mi)
- Time zone: UTC+5:30 (IST)
- PIN: 205261

Barnahal (Barnāhal) is a village and corresponding community development block in Karhal tehsil of Mainpuri district, Uttar Pradesh, India. Historically the seat of a pargana, Barnahal hosts a market twice per week. As of 2011, it had a population of 10,203, in 1,732 households.

== Geography ==
Barnahal is located about 32 km south of Mainpuri, the district headquarters, and 16 km west of Karhal, the tehsil headquarters.

According to the 2011 census, Barnahal has a total area of 635.8 hectares, of which 527 were farmland and 47.8 were under non-agricultural use. 2.6 hectares were occupied by orchards, 1.3 by pastures, 4.3 were classified as cultivable but not currently under any agricultural use, and 10.6 were classified as non-cultivable. No forests existed on village lands.

== History ==
Barnahal was historically the seat of a pargana under the Karhal tehsil, which had previously been known as Bibamau and before that Dehli-Jakhan (the "Dehli" refers to Dehuli, a village about 6 km south of Mainpuri). At the turn of the century, Barnahal was described as having a population of 2,461; besides the main village site, there were also 5 smaller hamlets counted as part of this total. At this point, the village had a post office, a halqabandi school, and a cattle pound, and it held markets twice weekly. The zamindar at that point was the Raja of Tirwa.

== Demographics ==
As of 2011, Barnahal had a population of 10,203, in 1,732 households. This population was 53.4% male (5,455) and 46.6% female (4,758). The 0-6 age group numbered 1,474 (771 male and 703 female), or 14.4% of the total population. 1,424 residents were members of Scheduled Castes, or 14.0% of the total.

The 1961 census recorded Barnahal as comprising 6 hamlets, with a total population of 3,570 people (1,712 male and 1,858 female), in 698 households and 560 physical houses. The area of the village was given as 1,571 acres and it had a post office at that point.

== Economy ==
Barnahal hosts a grain market twice per week, on Mondays and Fridays. There is a bank as well as an agricultural credit society.

== Infrastructure ==
As of 2011, Barnahal had 6 primary schools and 1 medical clinic. Drinking water was provided by well and hand pump; there were no public toilets. The village had a post office, as well as at least some access to electricity for all purposes. There was no public library. Streets were made of a mix of both kachcha and pakka materials.

== List of villages under Barnahal block ==
The following 89 villages are counted as part of Barnahal CD block:

1. Abdulnabipur
2. Agrapur
3. Ahmadpur
4. Ajampur
5. Alamgirpur
6. Alampur Deha
7. Amahasan Nagar
8. Andupur
9. Aspura
10. Aurangabad
11. Bahsi
12. Balpura
13. Bamtapur
14. Bangawan
15. Barnahal (block headquarters)
16. Bhagwatipur
17. Bhidaura
18. Bhurapur
19. Binepur
20. Birthua
21. Chandikara
22. Daloopur
23. Dariyapur
24. Dehuli
25. Dhakpura
26. Dharampur
27. Garhia Jainpur
28. Gaundai
29. Goliyapur
30. Gopiyapur
31. Gotpur
32. Hajipur Nera
33. Hajipur Samari
34. Hakimpur
35. Ikahra
36. Ismailpur
37. Jagannathpur
38. Jaitpur
39. Kalanderpur
40. Kalashpur
41. Kanikpur Khijarpur
42. Kanikpur Sada
43. Karukhera
44. Kasoli
45. Katholi
46. Kesopur
47. Kharaua
48. Khera Mahan
49. Kherendesh Nagar
50. Khushalpur
51. Kumheri
52. Lakhan Mau
53. Longpur
54. Marahamai
55. Masarpur
56. Mithepur
57. Mohanpur
58. Mugalpur
59. Muhabbatpur Labhuya
60. Nagla Bhai Khan
61. Nagla Mandhata
62. Nagla Niwhara
63. Nagla Sahab
64. Nawa Urf Teda
65. Nitawali
66. Normai
67. Pahadpur
68. Pairar Shahpur
69. Parasrampur
70. Phulapur
71. Prahladpur
72. Rahmatullaapur
73. Rasulpur
74. Rerapur
75. Saiyadpur Kahari
76. Saiyadpur Pran
77. Sajawarpur
78. Sajhajipur
79. Sarai Mugalpur
80. Saringa Nasirpur
81. Shahjadpur
82. Shahjahanpur
83. Shukrullapur
84. Sondra
85. Sothara
86. Sunupur
87. Terkara Daulatpur
88. Tulsipur
89. Urthan
