= Ismailpur, Mainpuri =

Village in Uttar Pradesh, India

Ismailpur
- Village
- Location in Uttar Pradesh, India
- Coordinates: 27.12448°N 78.8336°E
- Country: India
- State: Uttar Pradesh
- District: Mainpuri
- Tehsil: Karhal

Area
  - Total: 1.231 km^{2} (0.475 sq mi)

Population (2011)
  - Total: 603
  - Density: 490/km^{2} (1,270/sq mi)
- Time zone: UTC+5:30 (IST)

Ismailpur (Ismāīlpur) is a village in Barnahal block of Mainpuri district, Uttar Pradesh, India. As of 2011, it had a population of 603, in 115 households.

== Demographics ==
As of 2011, Ismailpur had a population of 603, in 115 households. This population was 53.6% male (323) and 46.4% female (280). The 0-6 age group numbered 98 (51 male and 47 female), or 16.3% of the total population. 71 residents were members of Scheduled Castes, or 11.8% of the total.

The 1961 census recorded Ismailpur as comprising 1 hamlet, with a total population of 243 people (137 male and 106 female), in 56 households and 36 physical houses. The area of the village was given as 309 acres.

== Infrastructure ==
As of 2011, Ismailpur had 1 primary school; it did not have any kind of healthcare facility. Drinking water was provided by hand pump and tube well; there were no public toilets. The village had a post office, as well as at least some access to electricity for all purposes. There was no public library. Streets were made of a mix of both kachcha and pakka materials.
