= Alamgirpur, Mainpuri =

Village in Uttar Pradesh, India

Alamgirpur
- Village
- Location in Uttar Pradesh, India
- Coordinates: 27.04411°N 78.81048°E
- Country: India
- State: Uttar Pradesh
- District: Mainpuri
- Tehsil: Karhal

Area
  - Total: 2.602 km^{2} (1.005 sq mi)

Population (2011)
  - Total: 630
  - Density: 240/km^{2} (630/sq mi)
- Time zone: UTC+5:30 (IST)

Alamgirpur (Ālamgīrpur) is a village in the Barnahal block of Mainpuri district, Uttar Pradesh, India. In 2011, it had a population of 630 in 107 households.

== Demographics ==
In 2011, Alamgirpur had a population of 630 in 107 households. The population was 52.7% male (332) and 47.3% female (298). The 0-6 age group numbered 113 (64 male and 49 female), or 17.9% of the total population. 65 residents were members of scheduled castes, or 10.3% of the total.

The 1961 census recorded Alamgirpur as comprising two hamlets, with a population of 262 (141 male and 121 female) in 42 households and 36 physical houses. The area of the village was given as 64 acres (26 ha).

== Infrastructure ==
In 2011, Alamgirpur did not have any schools or healthcare facilities. Drinking water was provided entirely by well and there were no public toilets. The village had a post office but no public library. There was at least some access to electricity for all purposes.
