= Khera Mahan =

Village in Uttar Pradesh, India

- Village
- Location in Uttar Pradesh, India
- Coordinates: 27.00423°N 78.79765°E
- Country: India
- State: Uttar Pradesh
- District: Mainpuri
- Tehsil: Karhal

Area
  - Total: 2.660 km^{2} (1.027 sq mi)

Population (2011)
  - Total: 2,910
  - Density: 1,090/km^{2} (2,830/sq mi)
- Time zone: UTC+5:30 (IST)

Khera Mahan (Kheṛā Mahān) is a village in Barnahal block of Mainpuri district, Uttar Pradesh, India. As of 2011, it had a population of 2,910, in 503 households.

== Demographics ==
As of 2011, Khera Mahan had a population of 2,910, in 503 households. This population was 54.0% male (1,572) and 46.0% female (1,338). The 0-6 age group numbered 412 (228 male and 184 female), or 14.2% of the total population. 485 residents were members of Scheduled Castes, or 16.7% of the total.

The 1961 census recorded Khera Mahan (as "Khera Mohan") as comprising 6 hamlets, with a total population of 999 people (525 male and 474 female), in 189 households and 157 physical houses. The area of the village was given as 885 acres.

== Infrastructure ==
As of 2011, Khera Mahan had 1 primary school and 1 primary health centre. Drinking water was provided by tap, hand pump, and tube well; there were no public toilets. The village had a post office but there is no public library; there was at least some access to electricity for all purposes. Streets were made of both kachcha and pakka materials.
