= Birthua =

Village in Uttar Pradesh, India

- Village
- Location in Uttar Pradesh, India
- Coordinates: 27.04082°N 78.79544°E
- Country: India
- State: Uttar Pradesh
- District: Mainpuri
- Tehsil: Karhal

Area
  - Total: 4.640 km^{2} (1.792 sq mi)

Population (2011)
  - Total: 2,987
  - Density: 643.8/km^{2} (1,667/sq mi)
- Time zone: UTC+5:30 (IST)

Birthua (Birthuā) is a village in Barnahal block of Mainpuri district, Uttar Pradesh. As of 2011, it has a population of 2,987, in 478 households.

== Demographics ==
As of 2011, Birthua had a population of 2,987, in 478 households. This population was 53.4% male (1,595) and 46.6% female (1,392). The 0-6 age group numbered 476 (265 male and 211 female), or 15.9% of the total population. 896 residents were members of Scheduled Castes, or 30.0% of the total.

The 1961 census recorded Birthua (as "Birthuna") as comprising 4 hamlets, with a total population of 1,087 people (579 male and 508 female), in 193 households and 134 physical houses. The area of the village was given as 1,168 acres.

== Infrastructure ==
As of 2011, Birthua had 1 primary school; it did not have any type of healthcare facility. Drinking water was provided by tap, hand pump, and tube well; there were no public toilets. The village had a post office and public library; there was at least some access to electricity for all purposes. Streets were made entirely of kachcha materials.
