= Dalupur =

Village in Uttar Pradesh, India

- Village
- Location in Uttar Pradesh, India
- Coordinates: 27.10677°N 78.81387°E
- Country: India
- State: Uttar Pradesh
- District: Mainpuri
- Tehsil: Karhal

Area
  - Total: 3.211 km^{2} (1.240 sq mi)

Population (2011)
  - Total: 3,180
  - Density: 990/km^{2} (2,560/sq mi)
- Time zone: UTC+5:30 (IST)

Dalupur (Ḍālūpur) is a village in Barnahal block of Mainpuri district, Uttar Pradesh, India. As of 2011, it had a population of 3,180, in 530 households. The last zamindar of Dalupur was Pandit Satyadev pachauri.

== Demographics ==
As of 2011, Dalupur had a population of 3,180, in 530 households. This population was 52.9% male (1,681) and 47.1% female (1,499). The 0-6 age group numbered 445 (231 male and 214 female), or 14.0% of the total population. 236 residents were members of Scheduled Castes, or 7.4% of the total.

The 1981 census recorded Dalupur as having a population of 2,171 people, in 241 households.

The 1961 census recorded Dalupur as comprising 7 hamlets, with a total population of 1,503 people (757 male and 746 female), in 265 households and 181 physical houses. The area of the village was given as 793 acres.

== Infrastructure ==
As of 2011, Dalupur had 1 primary school; it did not have any healthcare facilities. Drinking water was provided by hand pump and tube well/borehole; there were no public toilets. The village had a post office but no public library; there was at least some access to electricity for all purposes. Streets were made of both kachcha and pakka materials.
