= Nitawali =

Village in Uttar Pradesh, India

- Village
- Location in Uttar Pradesh, India
- Coordinates: 27.09676°N 78.94804°E
- Country: India
- State: Uttar Pradesh
- District: Mainpuri
- Tehsil: Karhal

Area
  - Total: 8.444 km^{2} (3.260 sq mi)

Population (2011)
  - Total: 2,878
  - Density: 340.8/km^{2} (882.8/sq mi)
- Time zone: UTC+5:30 (IST)

Nitawali (Nitāwālī) is a village in Barnahal block of Mainpuri district, Uttar Pradesh, India. As of 2011, it has a population of 2,878, in 492 households.

== Demographics ==
As of 2011, Nitawali had a population of 2,878, in 492 households. This population was 52.6% male (1,513) and 47.4% female (1,365). The 0-6 age group numbered 458 (222 male and 236 female), or 15.9% of the total population. 771 residents were members of Scheduled Castes, or 26.8% of the total.

The 1961 census recorded Nitawali as comprising 5 hamlets, with a total population of 1,186 people (649 male and 537 female), in 220 households and 171 physical houses. The area of the village was given as 2,087 acres.

== Infrastructure ==
As of 2011, Nitawali had 1 primary school; it did not have any kind of healthcare facility. Drinking water was provided by hand pump and tube well; there were no public toilets. The village had a post office and public library, as well as at least some access to electricity for all purposes. Streets were made entirely of kachcha materials.
