= Sarai Mugalpur =

Village in Uttar Pradesh, India

- Village
- Location in Uttar Pradesh, India
- Coordinates: 27.09702°N 78.84243°E
- Country: India
- State: Uttar Pradesh
- District: Mainpuri
- Tehsil: Karhal

Area
  - Total: 1.118 km^{2} (0.432 sq mi)

Population (2011)
  - Total: 1,050
  - Density: 939/km^{2} (2,430/sq mi)
- Time zone: UTC+5:30 (IST)

Sarai Mugalpur (Sarāy Mugalpur), also spelled Sarai Mughalpur, is a village in Barnahal block of Mainpuri district, Uttar Pradesh, India. As of 2011, it had a population of 1,050, in 173 households.

== Demographics ==
As of 2011, Sarai Mugalpur had a population of 1,929, in 315 households. This population was 51.9% male (545) and 48.1% female (505). The 0-6 age group numbered 136 (65 male and 71 female), or 13.0% of the total population. 121 residents were members of Scheduled Castes, or 11.5% of the total.

The 1981 census recorded Sarai Mugalpur as having a population of 436 people, in 68 households.

The 1961 census recorded Sarai Mughalpur as comprising 1 hamlet, with a total population of 314 people (177 male and 137 female), in 66 households and 42 physical houses. The area of the village was given as 295 acres.

== Infrastructure ==
As of 2011, Sarai Mugalpur had 1 primary school; it did not have any healthcare facilities. Drinking water was provided by hand pump; there were no public toilets. The village had a post office but no public library; there was at least some access to electricity for residential and agricultural (but not commercial) purposes. Streets were made of both kachcha and pakka materials.
