= Bhagavathar =

Bhagavatar may refer to:

- M. K. Thyagaraja Bhagavathar (1910–1959), known as MKT, Tamil Actor
- Honnappa Bhagavathar (1915–1992), Kannada Cinema Pioneer and Tamil, Kannada Artist
- Palghat Srirama Bhagavathar (1889–1957), Carnatic vocalist
- Muthiah Bhagavatar (1877–1945), composer
- Chembai Vaidyanatha Bhagavatar (1896–1974), Carnatic singer

== See also ==
- Bhagavata (disambiguation)
- Bhagwat (disambiguation)
