= Purana (disambiguation) =

Puran or Purana and similar word Purna can mean:

- Puran or Purna mean 'complete' in Hindi and Sanskrit respectively, in words like Purna avatar, Purna Swaraj and Purna Yoga
- Purana, a type of Hindu Indian literature
  - Mahapurana (Hinduism), the 18 major Puranas
  - Upapuranas, minor Puranas
- Purana (cicada), a genus of cicadas (Homoptera, Cicadidae) indigenous to southeast Asia

== Puran ==
- Puran, a subdivision and a tehsil of Shangla District, North-West Frontier Province NWFP, Pakistan
- Puran Appu, 1812–1848, a Sri Lankan historic figure
- Puran Poli, a type of Indian sweet
- Puran Bhagat, a temple at Taragarh near Dinanagar in Gurdaspur district, Punjab, India
- Puran Rana Tharu, a Nepalese politician
- Puran Bhatt, a renowned puppeteer of Rajasthan
- Puran Singh Phartyal, Indian politician

== Purana ==
- Purana (cicada), a genus of cicadas
  - Purana nebulilinea, a cicada species from southeast Asia
- Purana Mandir, a 1984 Hindi feature film
- Purana Qila, Delhi, an old fort
- Purana Kassapa (c. 5th or 4th centuries BCE), Indian ascetic teacher - contemporaneous with Mahavira and the Buddha
- Purana Task Force, the name of a police investigation into the underworld of Melbourne, Australia
- Purana pul, an old bridge which is a major landmark in Hyderabad, India

== See also ==
- Mahapurana (disambiguation)
- Bhagavata Purana (disambiguation)
