= Bahsi =

Village in Uttar Pradesh, India

- Village
- Location in Uttar Pradesh, India
- Coordinates: 27.11577°N 78.8116°E
- Country: India
- State: Uttar Pradesh
- District: Mainpuri
- Tehsil: Karhal

Area
  - Total: 1.674 km^{2} (0.646 sq mi)

Population (2011)
  - Total: 875
  - Density: 523/km^{2} (1,350/sq mi)
- Time zone: UTC+5:30 (IST)

Bahsi (Bahsī) is a village in Barnahal block of Mainpuri district, Uttar Pradesh. As of 2011, it has a population of 875, in 115 households.

== Demographics ==
As of 2011, Bahsi had a population of 875, in 115 households. This population was 50.9% male (445) and 49.1% female (430). The 0-6 age group numbered 154 (73 male and 81 female), or 17.6% of the total population. 370 residents were members of Scheduled Castes, or 42.3% of the total.

The 1961 census recorded Bahsi (as "Behisi") as comprising 1 hamlet, with a total population of 404 people (211 male and 193 female), in 50 households and 38 physical houses. The area of the village was given as 4,200 acres.

== Infrastructure ==
As of 2011, Bahsi had 1 primary school; it did not have any kind of healthcare facility. Drinking water was provided by tap and hand pump; there were no public toilets. The village had a post office, as well as at least some access to electricity for all purposes. There was no public library. Streets were mainly made of pakka materials.
