= Ahmadpur, Barnahal =

Village in Uttar Pradesh, India

Ahmadpur
- Village
- Location in Uttar Pradesh, India
- Coordinates: 27.01871°N 78.81865°E
- Country: India
- State: Uttar Pradesh
- District: Mainpuri
- Tehsil: Karhal

Area
  - Total: 1.256 km^{2} (0.485 sq mi)

Population (2011)
  - Total: 1,620
  - Density: 1,290/km^{2} (3,340/sq mi)
- Time zone: UTC+5:30 (IST)

Ahmadpur is a village in Barnahal block of Mainpuri district, Uttar Pradesh, India. As of 2011, it had a population of 1,620, in 271 households.

== Demographics ==
As of 2011, Ahmadpur had a population of 1,620, in 271 households. This population was 53.8% male (871) and 46.2% female (749). The 0-6 age group numbered 289 (151 male and 138 female), or 17.8% of the total population. 70 residents were members of Scheduled Castes, or 4.3% of the total.

The 1961 census recorded Ahmadpur as comprising 4 hamlets, with a total population of 634 people (346 male and 288 female), in 107 households and 70 physical houses. The area of the village was given as 316 acres.

== Infrastructure ==
As of 2011, Ahmadpur had 2 primary schools; it did not have any kind of healthcare facilities. Drinking water was provided by tap, hand pump, and tube well; there were no public toilets. The village had a post office and public library; there was at least some access to electricity for all purposes. Streets were made of both kachcha and pakka materials.
