= Ikahra =

Village in Uttar Pradesh, India

- Village
- Location in Uttar Pradesh, India
- Coordinates: 27.05882°N 78.82614°E
- Country: India
- State: Uttar Pradesh
- District: Mainpuri
- Tehsil: Karhal

Area
  - Total: 4.958 km^{2} (1.914 sq mi)

Population (2011)
  - Total: 2,829
  - Density: 570.6/km^{2} (1,478/sq mi)
- Time zone: UTC+5:30 (IST)
- PIN: 205261

Ikahra (Ikahrā) is a village in Barnahal block of Mainpuri district, Uttar Pradesh. As of 2011, it has a population of 2,829, in 467 households.

== Demographics ==
As of 2011, Ikahra had a population of 2,829, in 467 households. This population was 54.9% male (1,553) and 45.1% female (1,276). The 0-6 age group numbered 478 (265 male and 213 female), or 16.9% of the total population. 899 residents were members of Scheduled Castes, or 31.8% of the total.

The 1981 census recorded Ikahra (as "Ikahara") as having a population of 1,450 people, in 242 households.

The 1961 census recorded Ikahra as comprising 5 hamlets, with a total population of 857 people (463 male and 394 female), in 154 households and 118 physical houses. The area of the village was given as 1,245 acres.

== Infrastructure ==
As of 2011, Ikahra had 1 primary school; it did not have any healthcare facilities. Drinking water was provided by hand pump and tube well/borehole; there were no public toilets. The village had a post office and public library, as well as at least some access to electricity for all purposes. Streets were made of both kachcha and pakka materials.
