= Aurangabad, Barnahal =

Village in Uttar Pradesh, India

Aurangabad
- Village
- Location in Uttar Pradesh, India
- Coordinates: 27.085°N 78.84088°E
- Country: India
- State: Uttar Pradesh
- District: Mainpuri
- Tehsil: Karhal

Area
  - Total: 0.967 km^{2} (0.373 sq mi)

Population (2011)
  - Total: 948
  - Density: 980/km^{2} (2,540/sq mi)
- Time zone: UTC+5:30 (IST)
- PIN: 205261

Aurangabad (Auraṅgābād) is a village in Barnahal block of Mainpuri district, Uttar Pradesh. As of 2011, it has a population of 948, in 168 households.

== Demographics ==
As of 2011, Aurangabad had a population of 948, in 168 households. This population was 52.8% male (501) and 47.2% female (447). The 0-6 age group numbered 133 (74 male and 59 female), or 14.0% of the total population. 326 residents were members of Scheduled Castes, or 34.4% of the total.

The 1961 census recorded Aurangabad as comprising 1 hamlet, with a total population of 309 people (172 male and 137 female), in 55 households and 47 physical houses. The area of the village was given as 239 acres.

== Infrastructure ==
As of 2011, Aurangabad had 1 primary school; it did not have any kind of healthcare facility. Drinking water was provided by well and hand pump; there were no public toilets. The village had no post office or public library; it had at least some access to electricity for all purposes. Streets were made of both kachcha and pakka materials.
