= Dharampur, Mainpuri =

Village in Uttar Pradesh, India

Dharampur
- Village
- Location in Uttar Pradesh, India
- Coordinates: 27.06712°N 78.79747°E
- Country: India
- State: Uttar Pradesh
- District: Mainpuri
- Tehsil: Karhal

Area
  - Total: 1.264 km^{2} (0.488 sq mi)

Population (2011)
  - Total: 341
  - Density: 270/km^{2} (699/sq mi)
- Time zone: UTC+5:30 (IST)
- PIN: 205261

Dharampur (Dharampur) is a village in Barnahal block of Mainpuri district, Uttar Pradesh, India. As of 2011, it had a population of 341, in 64 households.

== Demographics ==
As of 2011, Dharampur had a population of 341, in 64 households. This population was 54.0% male (184) and 46.0% female (157). The 0-6 age group numbered 55 (25 male and 20 female), or 16.1% of the total population. No residents were members of Scheduled Castes.

The 1961 census recorded Dharampur as comprising 3 hamlets, with a total population of 178 people (104 male and 74 female), in 33 households and 25 physical houses. The area of the village was given as 313 acres.

== Infrastructure ==
As of 2011, Dharampur did not have any schools or healthcare facilities. Drinking water was provided by well and hand pump; there were no public toilets. The village had a post office, as well as at least some access to electricity for all purposes. There was no public library. Streets were made of both kachcha and pakka materials.
