= Nagla Mandhata =

Village in Uttar Pradesh, India

- Village
- Location in Uttar Pradesh, India
- Coordinates: 27.10712°N 78.80338°E
- Country: India
- State: Uttar Pradesh
- District: Mainpuri
- Tehsil: Karhal

Area
  - Total: 0.753 km^{2} (0.291 sq mi)

Population (2011)
  - Total: 1,830
  - Density: 2,430/km^{2} (6,290/sq mi)
- Time zone: UTC+5:30 (IST)

Nagla Mandhata (Naglā Māndhātā) is a village in Barnahal block of Mainpuri district, Uttar Pradesh. As of 2011, it has a population of 1,830, in 286 households.

== Demographics ==
As of 2011, Nagla Mandhata had a population of 1,830, in 286 households. This population was 54.1% male (991) and 45.8% female (839). The 0-6 age group numbered 283 (142 male and 141 female), or 15.5% of the total population. 597 residents were members of Scheduled Castes, or 32.6% of the total.

The 1961 census recorded Nagla Mandhata as comprising 1 hamlet, with a total population of 910 people (498 male and 412 female), in 188 households and 129 physical houses. The area of the village was given as 188 acres.

== Infrastructure ==
As of 2011, Nagla Mandhata had 1 primary school; it did not have any kind of healthcare facility. Drinking water was provided entirely by hand pump; there were no public toilets. The village had a post office, as well as at least some access to electricity for domestic and agricultural purposes. There was no public library. Streets were made of a mix of both kachcha and pakka materials.
