= Muhabbatpur Labhuya =

Village in Uttar Pradesh, India

- Village
- Location in Uttar Pradesh, India
- Coordinates: 27.01785°N 78.82434°E
- Country: India
- State: Uttar Pradesh
- District: Mainpuri
- Tehsil: Karhal

Area
  - Total: 2.344 km^{2} (0.905 sq mi)

Population (2011)
  - Total: 1,314
  - Density: 560.6/km^{2} (1,452/sq mi)
- Time zone: UTC+5:30 (IST)

Muhabbatpur Labhuya (Muhabbatpur Lābhuyā) is a village in Barnahal block of Mainpuri district, Uttar Pradesh, India. As of 2011, it had a population of 1,314, in 262 households.

== Demographics ==
As of 2011, Muhabbatpur Labhuya had a population of 1,314, in 262 households. This population was 53.1% male (698) and 46.9% female (616). The 0-6 age group numbered 180 (90 male and 90 female), or 13.7% of the total population. 314 residents were members of Scheduled Castes, or 23.9% of the total.

The 1961 census recorded Muhabbatpur Labhuya as comprising 2 hamlets, with a total population of 750 people (390 male and 360 female), in 133 households and 96 physical houses. The area of the village was given as 578 acres.

== Infrastructure ==
As of 2011, Muhabbatpur Labhuya had 1 primary school; it did not have any kind of healthcare facility. Drinking water was provided by tap and hand pump; there were no public toilets. The village had a post office and public library; there was at least some access to electricity for all purposes. Streets were made of pakka materials.
