= Mithepur =

Village in Uttar Pradesh, India

- Village
- Location in Uttar Pradesh, India
- Coordinates: 26.95412°N 78.83013°E
- Country: India
- State: Uttar Pradesh
- District: Mainpuri
- Tehsil: Karhal

Area
  - Total: 4.770 km^{2} (1.842 sq mi)

Population (2011)
  - Total: 1,604
  - Density: 336.3/km^{2} (870.9/sq mi)
- Time zone: UTC+5:30 (IST)

Mithepur (Miṭhepur) is a village in Barnahal block of Mainpuri district, Uttar Pradesh. As of 2011, it has a population of 1,604, in 259 households.

== Demographics ==
As of 2011, Mithepur had a population of 1,604, in 259 households. This population was 53.9% male (864) and 46.1% female (740). The 0-6 age group numbered 245 (136 male and 109 female), or 15.3% of the total population. 478 residents were members of Scheduled Castes, or 29.8% of the total.

The 1961 census recorded Mithepur as comprising 2 hamlets, with a total population of 507 people (263 male and 244 female), in 94 households and 75 physical houses. The area of the village was given as 477 acres.

== Infrastructure ==
As of 2011, Mithepur had 2 primary schools; it did not have any kind of healthcare facility. Drinking water was provided by hand pump and tube well; there were no public toilets. The village had a post office and public library; there was at least some access to electricity for all purposes. Streets were made of pakka materials.
