= Binepur =

Village in Uttar Pradesh, India

- Village
- Location in Uttar Pradesh, India
- Coordinates: 27.13212°N 78.83103°E
- Country: India
- State: Uttar Pradesh
- District: Mainpuri
- Tehsil: Karhal

Area
  - Total: 0.997 km^{2} (0.385 sq mi)

Population (2011)
  - Total: 352
  - Density: 353/km^{2} (914/sq mi)
- Time zone: UTC+5:30 (IST)

Binepur (Bīnepur) is a village in Barnahal block of Mainpuri district, Uttar Pradesh, India. As of 2011, it had a population of 352, in 66 households.

== Demographics ==
As of 2011, Binepur had a population of 352, in 66 households. This population was 51.7% male (182) and 48.3% female (170). The 0-6 age group numbered 48 (21 male and 27 female), or 13.6% of the total population. 108 residents were members of Scheduled Castes, or 30.7% of the total.

The 1981 census recorded Binepur as having a population of 196 people, in 45 households.

The 1961 census recorded Binepur (as "Bineypur") as comprising 2 hamlets, with a total population of 152 people (83 male and 69 female), in 36 households and 25 physical houses. The area of the village was given as 246 acres.

== Infrastructure ==
As of 2011, Binepur had 1 primary school; it did not have any healthcare facilities. Drinking water was provided by hand pump and tube well/borehole; there were no public toilets. The village had a post office but no public library; there was at least some access to electricity for residential and agricultural (but not commercial) purposes. Streets were made of both kachcha and pakka materials.
