= Dehuli, Mainpuri =

Village in Uttar Pradesh, India

Dehuli Dihuli
- Village
- Location in Uttar Pradesh, India
- Coordinates: 27.02698°N 78.80424°E
- Country: India
- State: Uttar Pradesh
- District: Mainpuri
- Tehsil: Karhal

Area
  - Total: 2.781 km^{2} (1.074 sq mi)

Population (2011)
  - Total: 3,517
  - Density: 1,265/km^{2} (3,275/sq mi)
- Time zone: UTC+5:30 (IST)

Dehuli (Dehulī), also spelled Dihuli (Dihulī), is a village in Barnahal block of Mainpuri district, Uttar Pradesh. Its first mention in historical sources is around the year 1420, during a rebellion against the Delhi Sultanate. As of 2011, Dehuli has a population of 3,517, in 584 households.

== Geography ==
Dehuli is located on the Sirsaganj-Karhal road, roughly equidistant from both of them.

== History ==
Dehuli appears in the annals of the Delhi Sultanate around the year 1420, when Taj ul-Mulk, a general under the sultan Khizr Khan, led a punitive campaign against a rebellion in the area. The sources mention how Taj ul-Mulk's forces sacked Dehuli, which they describe as "the strongest place in the possession of the infidels". E. R. Neaves interpreted this as a reference to the Bais Rajputs, who in later times were zamindars of Dehuli; he wrote that they were probably local rulers of Dehuli in the 1400s as well.

As of 1910, Dehuli was described as having a village school, three temples in the village, and two temples outside the village proper. A market was held twice weekly, on Tuesdays and Saturdays. The population as of 1901 was 362. Due to its small size, the village had become relatively unimportant, but it had previously been the seat of a tappa. This tappa was joined with Jakhan in Etawah district to form the pargana of "Dehli-Jahkan", or Bibamau, which was later distributed between the parganas of Barnahal in Mainpuri and Bibamau in Etawah. As of 1910 Dehuli was under Barnahal.

== Demographics ==
As of 2011, Dehuli had a population of 3,517, in 584 households. This population was 53.4% male (1,879) and 46.6% female (1,638). The 0-6 age group numbered 638 (338 male and 300 female), or 18.1% of the total population. 634 residents were members of Scheduled Castes, or 18.0% of the total.

The 1961 census recorded Dehuli (as "Dihuli") as comprising 1 hamlet, with a total population of 1,267 people (668 male and 599 female), in 243 households and 186 physical houses. The area of the village was given as 659 acres. Unlike in 1910 or 2011, no market was listed as meeting here.

== Economy ==
The 2011 census noted that Dehuli hosted both a regular market and a weekly haat. There were no banks or agricultural credit societies.

== Infrastructure ==
As of 2011, Dehuli had one primary school. It did not have any type of healthcare facility. Drinking water was variously sourced from tap and hand pump; there were no public toilets. The village had a post office and a public library, as well as at least some access to electricity for all purposes.

== Transport ==
Dehuli lies on the Sirsaganj-Karhal road and is served by both bus and taxi but not rail. Streets are mainly made of kachcha materials.
