= Mahapurana =

Mahapurana may refer to:

- Mahapurana (Hinduism), the 18 great Puranas of Hinduism, especially the Bhagavata Purana and Vishnu Purana
- Mahapurana (Jainism), a major Jain text by Jinasena

== See also ==
- Maha (disambiguation)
- Purana (disambiguation)
- Bhagavata Purana (disambiguation)
