= Surender Diler =

Indian Politician

Member of the Uttar Pradesh Legislative Assembly
- Incumbent
- Assumed office 23 November 2024
- Preceded by: Anoop Pradhan
- Constituency: Khair

Personal details
- Party: Bharatiya Janata Party
- Profession: Politician

Surender Diler is an Indian politician who is a member of the Uttar Pradesh Legislative Assembly. In the election of 2024 his winning margin was 3,8393 in the Bharatiya Janata Party Assembly for the Khair Assembly constituency.
