= Aspura =

Village in Uttar Pradesh, India

- Village
- Location in Uttar Pradesh, India
- Coordinates: 26.97844°N 78.84524°E
- Country: India
- State: Uttar Pradesh
- District: Mainpuri
- Tehsil: Karhal

Area
  - Total: 1.432 km^{2} (0.553 sq mi)

Population (2011)
  - Total: 319
  - Density: 223/km^{2} (577/sq mi)
- Time zone: UTC+5:30 (IST)

Aspura (Aspurā) is a village in Barnahal block of Mainpuri district, Uttar Pradesh. As of 2011, it had a population of 319, in 63 households.

== Demographics ==
As of 2011, Aspura had a population of 319, in 63 households. This population was 55.2% male (176) and 44.8% female (143). The 0-6 age group numbered 45 (26 male and 19 female), or 14.1% of the total population. 252 residents were members of Scheduled Castes, or 79.0% of the total.

The 1961 census recorded Aspura as comprising 1 hamlet, with a total population of 127 people (71 male and 56 female), in 23 households and 19 physical houses. The area of the village was given as 361 acres.

== Infrastructure ==
As of 2011, Aspura had 1 primary school; it did not have any kind of healthcare facilities. Drinking water was provided entirely by hand pump; there were no public toilets. The village had a post office but no public library; there was at least some access to electricity for all purposes. Streets were made of both kachcha and pakka materials.
