= Parasrampur, Barnahal =

Village in Uttar Pradesh, India

Parasrampur
- Village
- Location in Uttar Pradesh, India
- Coordinates: 27.03043°N 78.90066°E
- Country: India
- State: Uttar Pradesh
- District: Mainpuri
- Tehsil: Karhal

Area
  - Total: 1.103 km^{2} (0.426 sq mi)

Population (2011)
  - Total: 711
  - Density: 645/km^{2} (1,670/sq mi)
- Time zone: UTC+5:30 (IST)

Parasrampur (Parasrāmpur) is a village in Barnahal block of Mainpuri district, Uttar Pradesh, India. As of 2011, it had a population of 711, in 118 households.

== Demographics ==
As of 2011, Parasrampur had a population of 711, in 118 households. This population was 54.1% male (385) and 45.9% female (326). The 0-6 age group numbered 86 (44 male and 42 female), or 12.1% of the total population. 199 residents were members of Scheduled Castes, or 28.0% of the total.

The 1961 census recorded Parasrampur as comprising 2 hamlets, with a total population of 238 people (134 male and 104 female), in 45 households and 31 physical houses. The area of the village was given as 276 acres.

== Infrastructure ==
As of 2011, Parasrampur had 1 primary school, 1 medical clinic, and 1 dispensary. Drinking water was provided by tap, hand pump, and tube well; there were no public toilets. The village had a public library, as well as at least some access to electricity for all purposes. There was no post office. Streets were made of both kachcha and pakka materials.
