= Katholi =

Village in Uttar Pradesh, India

- Village
- Location in Uttar Pradesh, India
- Coordinates: 27.0782°N 78.86916°E
- Country: India
- State: Uttar Pradesh
- District: Mainpuri
- Tehsil: Karhal

Area
  - Total: 1.31 km^{2} (0.51 sq mi)

Population (2011)
  - Total: 723
  - Density: 552/km^{2} (1,430/sq mi)
- Time zone: UTC+5:30 (IST)
- PIN: 205261

Katholi (Kaṭholī) is a village in Barnahal block of Mainpuri district, Uttar Pradesh. As of 2011, it has a population of 723, in 142 households.

== Demographics ==
As of 2011, Katholi had a population of 723, in 142 households. This population was 54.1% male (391) and 45.9% female (332). The 0-6 age group numbered 51 (26 male and 25 female), or 7.1% of the total population. No residents were members of Scheduled Castes.

The 1961 census recorded Katholi as comprising 2 hamlets, with a total population of 365 people (187 male and 178 female), in 67 households and 46 physical houses. The area of the village was given as 326 acres.

== Infrastructure ==
As of 2011, Katholi had 1 primary school; it did not have any kind of healthcare facility. Drinking water was provided by well and hand pump; there were no public toilets. The village had a post office, as well as at least some access to electricity for all purposes. There was no public library. Streets were made of a mix of both kachcha and pakka materials.
