= Kumheri =

Village in Uttar Pradesh, India

- Village
- Location in Uttar Pradesh, India
- Coordinates: 26.971°N 78.83996°E
- Country: India
- State: Uttar Pradesh
- District: Mainpuri
- Tehsil: Karhal

Area
  - Total: 4.467 km^{2} (1.725 sq mi)

Population (2011)
  - Total: 3,370
  - Density: 754/km^{2} (1,950/sq mi)
- Time zone: UTC+5:30 (IST)

Kumheri (Kumherī) is a village in Barnahal block of Mainpuri district, Uttar Pradesh India. As of 2011, it had a population of 3,370, in 609 households.

== Demographics ==
As of 2011, Kumheri had a population of 3,370, in 609 households. This population was 52.6% male (1,771) and 47.4% female (1,599). The 0-6 age group numbered 458 (230 male and 228 female), or 13.6% of the total population. 1,146 residents were members of Scheduled Castes, or 34.0% of the total.

The 1961 census recorded Kumheri as comprising 4 hamlets, with a total population of 1,494 people (696 male and 798 female), in 206 households and 154 physical houses. The area of the village was given as 1,111 acres.

== Infrastructure ==
As of 2011, Kumheri had 2 primary schools; it did not have any kind of healthcare facilities. Drinking water was provided by hand pump and tube well; there were no public toilets. The village had a post office and public library; there was at least some access to electricity for domestic and agricultural purposes. Streets were made of both kachcha and pakka materials.
