= Bhagavata Puranas =

There are two Bhagavatas in Hindu Puranic literature:

- Bhagavata Purana, Vishnu-related text
- Devi Bhagavata Purana, Devi-related text

== See also ==
- Bhagavata (disambiguation)
- Purana (disambiguation)
- Mahapurana (disambiguation)
