= Hakimpur, Mainpuri =

Village in Uttar Pradesh, India

Hakimpur
- Village
- Location in Uttar Pradesh, India
- Coordinates: 27.08609°N 78.85193°E
- Country: India
- State: Uttar Pradesh
- District: Mainpuri
- Tehsil: Karhal

Area
  - Total: 0.814 km^{2} (0.314 sq mi)

Population (2011)
  - Total: 866
  - Density: 1,060/km^{2} (2,760/sq mi)
- Time zone: UTC+5:30 (IST)
- PIN: 205261

Hakimpur (Hakīmpur) is a village in Barnahal block of Mainpuri district, Uttar Pradesh. As of 2011, it has a population of 866, in 125 households.

== Demographics ==
As of 2011, Hakimpur had a population of 603, in 115 households. This population was 53.7% male (465) and 46.3% female (401). The 0-6 age group numbered 143 (75 male and 68 female), or 16.5% of the total population. 91 residents were members of Scheduled Castes, or 10.1% of the total.

The 1961 census recorded Hakimpur as comprising 1 hamlet, with a total population of 338 people (166 male and 172 female), in 69 households and 49 physical houses. The area of the village was given as 203 acres.

== Infrastructure ==
As of 2011, Hakimpur had 1 primary school; it did not have any kind of healthcare facility. Drinking water was provided by well and hand pump; there were no public toilets. The village had a post office, as well as at least some access to electricity for all purposes. There was no public library. Streets were made of both kachcha and pakka materials.
