= Bhagavad Gita (disambiguation) =

The Bhagavad Gita a Hindu scripture in Sanskrit that is part of the Mahabharata.

Bhagavad Gita may also refer to:

- The Song Celestial by Sir Edwin Arnold
- Bhagavad Gita - Song of God by Swami Prabhavananda and Christopher Isherwood
- Bhagavad-Gītā as It Is, a translation and commentary of the Bhagavad Gita by A.C. Bhaktivedanta Swami Prabhupada
- God Talks with Arjuna: The Bhagavad Gita by Paramahansa Yogananda
- Bhagavad Gita (Sargeant), a 1979 translation of the scripture by Winthrop Sargeant
- Bhagavad Gita (film), a 1993 film by G. V. Iyer

== See also ==
- Bhagavata (disambiguation)
- Gita (disambiguation)
- Bhagavad Gita trial in Russia
- Influence of Bhagavad Gita
