= Sothra =

Village in Uttar Pradesh, India

- Village
- Location in Uttar Pradesh, India
- Coordinates: 27.08809°N 78.82416°E
- Country: India
- State: Uttar Pradesh
- District: Mainpuri
- Tehsil: Karhal

Area
  - Total: 1.698 km^{2} (0.656 sq mi)

Population (2011)
  - Total: 1,929
  - Density: 1,136/km^{2} (2,942/sq mi)
- Time zone: UTC+5:30 (IST)

Sothra (Sothrā) is a village in Barnahal block of Mainpuri district, Uttar Pradesh. As of 2011, it had a population of 1,929, in 315 households.

== Demographics ==
As of 2011, Sothra had a population of 1,929, in 315 households. This population was 51.6% male (996) and 48.4% female (933). The 0-6 age group numbered 297 (154 male and 143 female), or 15.4% of the total population. 610 residents were members of Scheduled Castes, or 31.6% of the total.

The 1981 census recorded Sothra as having a population of 971 people, in 144 households.

The 1961 census recorded Sothra as comprising 1 hamlet, with a total population of 617 people (340 male and 277 female), in 118 households and 99 physical houses. The area of the village was given as 412 acres.

== Infrastructure ==
As of 2011, Sothra had 1 primary school; it did not have any healthcare facilities. Drinking water was provided by hand pump and tube well/borehole; there were no public toilets. The village had a post office but no public library; there was at least some access to electricity for residential and agricultural (but not commercial) purposes. Streets were made of both kachcha and pakka materials.
