= Gotpur =

Village in Uttar Pradesh, India

- Village
- Location in Uttar Pradesh, India
- Coordinates: 26.97944°N 78.81962°E
- Country: India
- State: Uttar Pradesh
- District: Mainpuri
- Tehsil: Karhal

Area
  - Total: 2.419 km^{2} (0.934 sq mi)

Population (2011)
  - Total: 1,761
  - Density: 728.0/km^{2} (1,885/sq mi)
- Time zone: UTC+5:30 (IST)

Gotpur (Gotpur) is a village in Barnahal block of Mainpuri district, Uttar Pradesh, India. As of 2011, it had a population of 1,761, in 314 households.

== Demographics ==
As of 2011, Gotpur had a population of 1,761, in 314 households. This population was 52.6% male (926) and 47.4% female (835). The 0-6 age group numbered 249 (136 male and 113 female), or 14.1% of the total population. 175 residents were members of Scheduled Castes, or 9.9% of the total.

The 1961 census recorded Gotpur as comprising 2 hamlets, with a total population of 845 people (460 male and 385 female), in 143 households and 88 physical houses. The area of the village was given as 660 acres.

== Infrastructure ==
As of 2011, Gotpur had 2 primary schools; it did not have any kind of healthcare facilities. Drinking water was provided by hand pump and tube well; there were no public toilets. The village had a public library but no post office; there was at least some access to electricity for all purposes. Streets were made of both kachcha and pakka materials.
