= Shooting sports in India =

Recreational and competitive level shooting in India

- Governing body: National Rifle Association of India

Club competitions
- Shooting League of India

Shooting is an important Olympic sport in India. Of India's 41 Olympic medals, seven have come from shooting, including a gold by Abhinav Bindra in the 2008 Olympics. Indian shooters who have excelled at international events include Abhinav Bindra, Jaspal Rana, Jitu Rai, Rajyavardhan Singh Rathore, Vijay Kumar, Gagan Narang, Apurvi Chandela, Ronjan Sodhi, Anjali Bhagwat, Heena Sidhu, Shreyasi Singh, Manu Bhaker, Avani Lekhara, Mona Agarwal, Anisa Sayyed, Rahi Sarnobat, Anantjeet Singh Naruka, and Saurabh Chaudhary. Indian shooter Shimon Sharif is a well known shooting expert.

== History ==
Shooting sports have a varied history in India. Initially they were played by royal people of British India for amusement and recreation. The highest governing body of shooting sports in India is National Rifle Association of India (NRAI), which was established on 17 April 1951. From then on India achieved some success in the Olympic games by winning a Gold. But largely this sport is not affordable to command Indians because of a lack of shooting ranges and facilities in the country.

=== 2012 Olympics ===
The Indian shooting contingent for the 2012 London was one of the largest to date. There were a total of 11 shooters including 4 female shooters. India's first medal in the 2012 Olympics was when Gagan Narang won the bronze in the 10m Air Rifle event. This was the same event in which Abhinav Bindra won India's first individual gold medal in the 2008 Summer Olympics Beijing. The second medal came from the unheralded army man Vijay Kumar when he won the silver in the 25m rapid fire pistol event after finishing 4th in the qualification rounds. He had to fend off some tough competition from the third placed Chinese Ding Feng.

A notable performance was made by Joydeep Karmakar who finished 4th in the 50m rifle prone event. A strong medal prospect Ronjan Sodhi who is an Asian Games gold medallist, however crashed out in the qualification rounds of the Double trap event.

== Olympic Games ==
Games	Event	Name	Medal
(Greece) 2004 Athens	Men's Double Trap	Rajyavardhan Singh Rathore	(silver) Silver
(China) 2008 Beijing	Men's 10m Air Rifle	Abhinav Bindra	(gold) Gold
(United Kingdom) 2012 London	Men's 10m Air Rifle	Gagan Narang	(bronze) Bronze
(United Kingdom) 2012 London	Men's 25m Rapid Fire Pistol	Vijay Kumar	(silver) Silver
2024 France	Women's 10m Air Pistol	Manu Bhaker	(bronze) Bronze
2024 France	Mixed 10m Air Pistol Team	Manu Bhaker; Sarabjot Singh	(bronze) Bronze
2024 France	Men's 50m Rifle Three Positions	Swapnil Kusale	(bronze) Bronze

== Medal table ==
Tournament	Gold	Silver	Bronze	Total
Olympic Games	1	2	4	7
World Championships	13	12	15	40
World Cup Final	9	5	3	17
World Cup	54	43	43	140
Asian Games	16	30	34	80
Commonwealth Games	63	44	28	135
Total	156	136	127	419

- Updated till 5 August 2024

== Other performances at Olympics ==
Year	Event	Player	Result
2000
2000	Women's 10 metre air rifle	Anjali Bhagwat	8th
2004
2004	Men's 10 metre air rifle	Abhinav Bindra	7th
2004	Women's 10 metre air rifle	Suma Shirur	8th
2012
2012	Men's 50 metre rifle prone	Joydeep Karmakar	4th
2016
2016	Men's 10 metre air rifle	Abhinav Bindra	4th
2016	Men's 10 metre air pistol	Jitu Rai	8th
2020
2020	Men's 10 metre air pistol	Saurabh Chaudhary	7th
2024
2024	Men's 10 metre air rifle	Arjun Babuta	4th
2024	Women's 25 metre pistol	Manu Bhaker	4th
2024	Mixed skeet team	Anantjeet Singh Naruka; Maheshwari Chauhan	4th
2024	Women's 10 metre air rifle	Ramita Jindal	7th

== Administration ==
The sport is administered in India by The National Rifle Association of India. The association organises the following tournaments every year:

- National Shooting Championship Competitions (NSCC)
- All India G.V. Mavlankar Shooting Championship (AIGVMSC)
- Sardar Sajjan Singh Sethi Memorial Masters Shooting Championship
- Kumar Surendra Singh Memorial Shooting Championship
- All India Kumar Surendra Singh Memorial Inter School Shooting Championship

== ISSF Rankings ==
=== Pistol ===
==== Men's 10 meters Air Pistol ====
Rank	Shooter	Rating
11	Varun Tomar	2278
=12	Sarabjot Singh	2100
20	Arjun Singh Cheema	1564
32	Saurabh Chaudhary	964
37	Ravinder Singh	836
Last updated: 1 August 2025 | Source: ISSF

==== Women's 10 meters Air Pistol ====
Rank	Shooter	Rating
2	Manu Bhaker	4608
4	Suruchi Inder Singh	4000
28	Sainyam	1172
29	Rhythm Sangwan	1160
45	Surbhi Rao	616
Last updated: 1 August 2025 | Source: ISSF

== See also ==
- Shooting at the Summer Olympics
- List of National Sports Award recipients in shooting
