= Anjali Bhagwat =

Indian sport shooter

Personal information
- Nationality: Indian
- Born: Anjali Ramakanta Vedpathak; 5 December 1969 (age 56) Mumbai, Maharashtra
- Height: 5 ft 4 in (163 cm)
- Website: anjalibhagwat.com

Sport
- Sport: Rifle shooting
- Turned pro: 1988
Medal record
Women's shooting
Representing India
Asian Championships
Silver medal – second place	2012 Doha	10 m air rifle team
Commonwealth Games
Gold medal – first place	2002 Manchester	Air Rifle (Individual)
Gold medal – first place	2002 Manchester	Air Rifle Team
Gold medal – first place	2002 Manchester	3P (Individual)
Gold medal – first place	2002 Manchester	3P Team
Silver medal – second place	2006 Melbourne	3P Team
Commonwealth Championships
Gold medal – first place	1999 Auckland	Air Rifle (Individual)
Gold medal – first place	1999 Auckland	Air Rifle Team
Gold medal – first place	1999 Auckland	3P(Individual)
Gold medal – first place	2001 England	Air Rifle (Individual)
Gold medal – first place	2001 England	Air Rifle Team
Gold medal – first place	2001 England	3P(Individual)
Gold medal – first place	2001 England	3P Team
Gold medal – first place	2005 Melbourne	Air Rifle Team
Gold medal – first place	2005 Melbourne	3P (Individual)
Silver medal – second place	1999 Auckland	3P Team
Silver medal – second place	2001 England	Air Rifle Team
Silver medal – second place	2005 Melbourne	Air Rifle (Individual)

Anjali Bhagwat (born 5 December 1969) is a professional Indian sport shooter. She became the World Number One in 10m Air Rifle in 2002. She also won her first World Cup Final in Milan, in 2003, with a score of 399/400.

Anjali won the ISSF Champion of Champions award and is the only Indian to win the ISSF Champions' Trophy in Air Rifle Men & Women mixed event at Munich in 2002. She has represented India in three consecutive Olympics, and was a finalist in the 2000 Sydney Olympics, a first for any Indian women shooter and also the first Indian athlete to make an Olympic final since P.T. Usha in 1984. She has won 12 gold and 4 silver medals in the Commonwealth Games and Commonwealth Shooting Championships. She is a Commonwealth record holder in 10m Air Rifle and Sports Rifle 3P. In the 2003 Afro-Asian Games, Bhagwat created history by becoming the first Indian woman shooter to get gold and a silver medal in the Sports 3P and Air Rifle events respectively.

To date, she has won 31 Gold, 23 Silver and 7 Bronze medals. She has set 13 new records in international competitions and has won 55 Gold, 35 Silver and 16 Bronze medals, with 8 new records in national competitions in India.

== Early life ==
Anjali Ramakant Vedpathak was born on 5 December 1969, in a Marathi family in Mumbai. Inspired by the legendary athlete Carl Lewis, Bhagwat developed an interest in sports. Her first brush with shooting occurred during her stint as a cadet in the National Cadet Corps (NCC). A student of Judo Karate and advanced mountaineering, Bhagwat was very much attracted to NCC. She joined Kirti College in Mumbai mainly due to its close affinity with the NCC. As a part of her curriculum she got into MRA (Maharashtra Rifle Association). She started shooting at the age of 21 and within 7 days of holding a gun, she took part in the National Championship of 1988, winning a silver medal for Maharashtra in the process.

== Career ==
Sanjay Chakravarthy was her first coach. She credits him for her strong fundamentals and basics; instilled over a period of over 5 years. She turned pro when she first participated in the National Championships in 1988. She won Silver for her state and continues to play for the Maharashtra team. Her tally of 55 Gold, 35 Silver and 16 Bronze medals in domestic Competitions is unbeaten.

She participated in her first international event in 1995, in the SAF games. Her first international Gold winning performance was in the Commonwealth Championship in Auckland in 1999, where she won 3 Gold medals and a silver medal in Air Rifle, 3P individual and the team event. She is the only woman to have won the World Cup for India. She considers her rival Galkina Lioubov (Russia) as an idol competitor.

In December 1999, she started training under Laszlo Szucsak, the then coach for the Indian Shooting Team. Bhagwat had personally approached Laszlo after watching his work with the Malaysian Shooting squad. The Hungarian remained with the team for a year during which Bhagwat earned a wild card entry in the 2000 Sydney Olympics, where she went on to become one of the finalists. From 2001 to 2004, Bhagwat trained without a coach, and still managed to become World Number One in 2002.

During the year 2006, Laszlo re-joined the national shooting squad as the team Coach, and Bhagwat trained with him till 2008. In the year 2008, Stanislav Lapidus was appointed the coach by the Indian National Army for the national squad. Many stalwarts of the sport of shooting often rate World Championships higher than the Olympics. Bhagwat has ranked her victory as the Champions of Champions in 2002 as the best moment in her career. She still remains the only Indian to have ever won the title.

== Competitions ==
Championship	Location	Event	Score/Rank	Medal
Europe Circuit 2007	Hungary	Air Rifle ( ind )	396	Bronze
World Cup 2006	Brazil	Sports 3P ( ind )	582 / IV	Quota Place
Commonwealth Games 2006	Melbourne	Sports 3P (Team)	373	Silver
Commonwealth Championship 2005	Melbourne	Air Rifle ( ind )	398	
Commonwealth Championship 2005	Melbourne	Team	395	Silver
Commonwealth Championship 2005	Melbourne	Sports 3P Team	573	Gold
Olympics 2004	Athens	Sports 3P ( ind )	575 / XIII	
World Cup 2004	Sydney	Sports 3P ( ind )	583	Bronze
Afro Asian Games 2003	India	Air Rifle ( ind )	396	Silver
Afro Asian Games 2003	India	Sports 3P	577	Gold
World Cup Finals 2003	Milan	Air Rifle	399	Gold*
World Cup Finals 2003	Atlanta	Air Rifle	399	Gold*
Asian Games 2002	Korea	Air Rifle (Team)	396	Silver
World Cup Finals 2002	Munich	Air Rifle ( ind )	399	Silver*
Commonwealth Games 2002	England	Air Rifle ( ind )	398	Gold (New Record)
Commonwealth Games 2002	England	Air Rifle ( Team )	398	Gold (New Record)
Commonwealth Games 2002	England	Sports 3P ( ind )	578	Gold (New Record)
Commonwealth Games 2002	England	Sports 3P	574	Gold (New Record)
World Cup 2002	Atlanta	Air Rifle ( ind )	399	Silver (Quota Place )
World Cup 2002	Sydney	Air Rifle ( ind )	397	Silver*
Europe Circuit 2002	Munich	Air Rifle (1st Day)	398	Gold
Europe Circuit 2002	Denmark	Air Rifle (2nd Day)	398	Silver
Europe Circuit 2002	Denmark	Air Rifle (1st Day)	398	Silver
Europe Circuit 2002	Denmark	Team	396	Silver
Europe Circuit 2002	Denmark	Team	397	Gold
Europe Circuit 2002	Denmark	Air Rifle (2nd Day)	399	Bronze
Europe Circuit 2002	Denmark	Team		Silver
Europe Circuit 2002	Denmark	Air Rifle (3rd Day)		Gold (Equaled World Record)
Europe Circuit 2002	Denmark	Team		Silver
Commonwealth Championship 2001	England	Air Rifle ( ind )	396	Gold (Record)
Commonwealth Championship 2001	England	Team	582	Gold
Commonwealth Championship 2001	England	Sports 3P ( ind )		Gold
Commonwealth Championship 2001	England	Team		(New Record)
Commonwealth Championship 2001	England			Silver
Olympics 2000	Sydney	Air Rifle ( ind )	394 / VII	Finalist
Grand Prix 2000	Czech	Air Rifle ( ind )	396	Silver
Asian Championships 2000	Malaysia	Sport Prone ( ind )	588	Silver
Asian Championships 2000	Malaysia	Team		Gold
Commonwealth Championship 1999	Auckland	Air Rifle ( ind )	398	Gold
Commonwealth Championship 1999	Auckland	Team	571	(New Record)
Commonwealth Championship 1999	Auckland	Sports 3P ( ind )		Gold
Commonwealth Championship 1999	Auckland	Team		(New Record)
Commonwealth Championship 1999	Auckland			Gold
Commonwealth Championship 1999	Auckland			(New Record)
Commonwealth Championship 1999	Auckland			Silver
Ociana Championship 1999	Sydney	Air Rifle	395	Gold
SAF Games 1999	Nepal	Air Rifle ( ind )	396	Gold (New Record)
SAF Games 1999	Nepal	Team	568	Gold (New Record)
SAF Games 1999	Nepal	Sports 3P ( ind )	574	Gold (New Record)
SAF Games 1999	Nepal	Team		Gold (New Record)
SAF Games 1999	Nepal	Sport Prone ( ind )		Silver
SAF Games 1999	Nepal	Team		Bronze
SAF Championship 1997	New Delhi	Air Rifle ( ind )		Gold
SAF Championship 1997	New Delhi	Team		Gold
SAF Championship 1997	New Delhi	Sport Prone (Team)		Silver
SAF Championship 1997	New Delhi			Gold
SAF Games 1995	Madras	Air Rifle (Team)		Bronze
SAF Games 1995	Madras	Sports 3P ( ind )		Silver
SAF Games 1995	Madras	Team		Gold

== Equipment and sponsors ==
Bhagwat uses a Feinwerkbau, a German-made rifle for her Air Rifle events. For 10m she prefers a Feinwerkbau while for 50m she uses a .22 Walther.

Bhagwat's first kit was gifted to her by Bollywood actor and a fellow shooter, Nana Patekar in 1993. She was officially sponsored by the Hinduja Foundation in 2000, and later by the Mittal Champions Trust in 2008. Hyundai Corporation also supported her training prior to 2004.

== Awards ==
Rajiv Gandhi Khel-Ratna (2003)
Arjuna Award (2000)

- 1992:Shree Shiv Chattrapati Award
- 1993:Maharashtra Gaurav Puraskar
- 1993:Vasantrav Naik Pratishthan Puraskar
- 2002:Indo-American Society Young Achiever award
- 2003:Times Group Maharashtra Shaan
- 2003:Hero Indian Sports Award -Best sportswoman
- 2003:HISA Sports Woman of the year
- 2003:HISA Shooter of the year
- 2004:HISA Shooter of the year
- 2005:GR8 women achievers award
- 2005:Teacher's achievement award
- 2006:F I E Foundation National award

== Personal life ==
Bhagwat has two siblings; a younger brother Rahul and an elder sister Neena. She is a tennis and cricket enthusiast. Yoga and meditation form a large part of her daily routine. Her mother sang for AIR (All India Radio) while her sister is a singer too. An avid reader, she enjoys fiction.

In December 2000, she married Mumbai-based businessman, Mandar Bhagwat. The couple has a son named Aaradhya born in 2010. In 2006, she shifted her base from Mumbai to Pune due city's better sporting facilities. Bhagwat is currently coaching six shooters in Pune, for which she also utilizes her own range. The 10m range is a part of her house and she usually practises there.

== In popular culture ==
She has promoted sports through associations with Sahara and Reliance. Bhagwat was vastly appreciated for her participation in India's bid for hosting Commonwealth Games 2010 alongside sporting legends like Sunil Gavaskar.

Bhagwat was a part of the Bournvita Quiz Contest as a special guest. She was also a part of the expert panel on CNN-IBN during the Commonwealth Games in 2006 and 2010. She featured in the Hero Honda Sports Awards, 2007 where she sang and danced impromptu with former Indian cricketers Vinod Kambli and Ajay Jadeja. She has also been the subject of inspiration for many including a noted writer and columnist, Shobha De, who dedicated her column to Bhagwat after their interaction at an award ceremony.

She has been on the government selection panel for some of the top notch sports award, both on state & national level such as Shiv Chatrapati Award, Arjuna Award and Dronacharaya Award. Apart from this she has done a guest appearance in Marathi film Bokya Satbande. She has walked ramp twice for fashion designer Vikram Phadnis. She has been teaching blind students. She regularly writes for different newspaper and magazines.
