= Tulsipur, Mainpuri =

Village in Uttar Pradesh, India

Tulsipur
- Village
- Location in Uttar Pradesh, India
- Coordinates: 27.04896°N 78.87299°E
- Country: India
- State: Uttar Pradesh
- District: Mainpuri
- Tehsil: Karhal

Area
  - Total: 0.86 km^{2} (0.33 sq mi)

Population (2011)
  - Total: 450
  - Density: 520/km^{2} (1,400/sq mi)
- Time zone: UTC+5:30 (IST)

Tulsipur (Tulsīpur) is a village in Barnahal block of Mainpuri district, Uttar Pradesh. As of 2011, it has a population of 450, in 77 households.

== Demographics ==
As of 2011, Tulsipur had a population of 450, in 77 households. This population was 55.6% male (250) and 44.4% female (200). The 0-6 age group numbered 41 (21 male and 20 female), or 9.1% of the total population. 8 residents were members of Scheduled Castes, or 1.8% of the total.

The 1961 census recorded Tulsipur as comprising 1 hamlet, with a total population of 234 people (133 male and 101 female), in 43 households and 36 physical houses. The area of the village was given as 215 acres.

== Infrastructure ==
As of 2011, Tulsipur did not have any school or any kind of healthcare facility. Drinking water was provided by well and hand pump; there were no public toilets. The village had a post office but no public library; there was at least some access to electricity for all purposes. Streets were made of both kachcha and pakka materials.
