= Bhagwat (surname) =

Hindu Brahmin surname

Bhagwat (also spelled as Bhagvat), is a surname found among Hindu Brahmin and Hindu Mali, Maratha communities in India. It is found mainly among Deshastha Brahmins, Chitpavan Brahmins and Karhade Brahmins.

== Etymology ==
The term Bhagwat or Bhagvat or Bhagavate means a follower of Bhagavata Sampradaya of Madhvacharya. They are devotees of Bhagavān Krishna.

== Notable people ==
- Anjali Bhagwat (born 1969), rifle shooter from India
- Anupama Bhagwat (born 1974), Indian sitar player
- Durga Bhagwat (1910–2002), Indian scholar, socialist and writer
- Mohan Bhagwat (born 1950), current Sarsanghachalak of the Rashtriya Swayamsevak Sangh (RSS), a right-wing Hindutva paramilitary organisation
- Sitaram Bhaskar Bhagwat (1904–1999), freedom fighter, Indian political and social leader in Uttar Pradesh, India.
- Vishnu Bhagwat, former Chief of the Naval Staff of India
- Neela Bhagwat, Hindustani classical vocalist, Gwalior gharana.

== See also ==
- Latey family
