= Feinwerkbau =

German firearm manufacturer

Feinwerkbau Westinger & Altenburger GmbH
- Company type: Private, GmbH
- Industry: Sporting Arms
- Founded: 1951
- Headquarters: Oberndorf, Germany
- Key people: Karl Westinger and Ernst Altenburger, Founders
- Products: Firearms, weapons, CAM services
- Revenue: ▲ unknown
- Number of employees: ~115 (2024)
- Website: www.feinwerkbau.de

Feinwerkbau /ˈfaɪnwɜːrkbaʊ/, often abbreviated FWB, is a German manufacturer of firearms and air guns aimed mainly at competitive ISSF shooting events, including some contested at the Olympic Games as governed by the International Shooting Sport Federation (ISSF).

The company currently offers three distinct product lines: air pistols and rifles, small caliber .177 and .22 lr rifles and competition pistols as well as two muzzleloading black powder smallarms, chambered in .36 and .44. It also offers several accessories, an archery trigger release and high-precision industrial machining and manufacturing services. Feinwerkbau has on-site service staff available at various European shooting events.

The name Feinwerkbau is German, which translates to "precision technology works".

== History ==
The company was established 1949 by Karl Westinger and Ernst Altenburger, both former employees of Mauser where Westinger had been responsible for an important design improvement to the Mauser C96 “Broomhandle” pistol. Because of post-war sanctions, there were few opportunities to develop small arms in Germany during the 1950s and so the fledgling company spent its first decade concentrating on the manufacture of precision parts and machines (particularly electro-mechanical calculators). In the late 1950s they returned to their original design focus with the development of the first truly successful recoilless target air rifle (an area which was excluded from the weapon manufacturing restrictions but which could tap into the undiminished German interest in target shooting). This was launched as the LG150 in 1963 and was followed with their first air-pistol in 1965.

== Air rifles ==
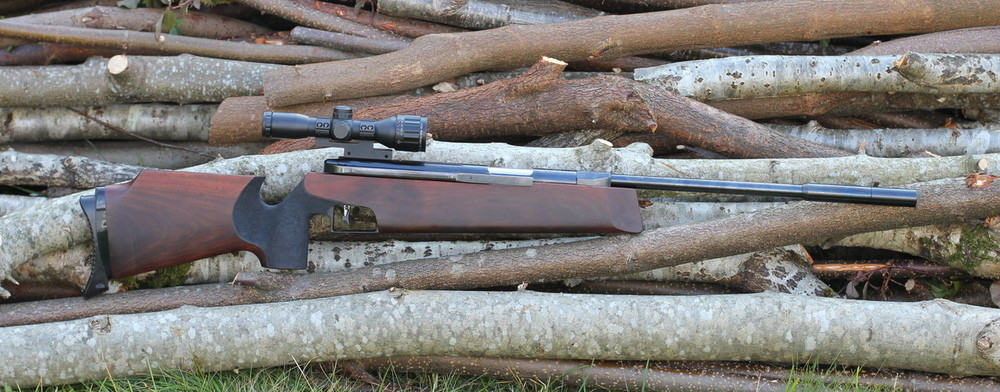
FWB 300 S with a mounted telescopic sight

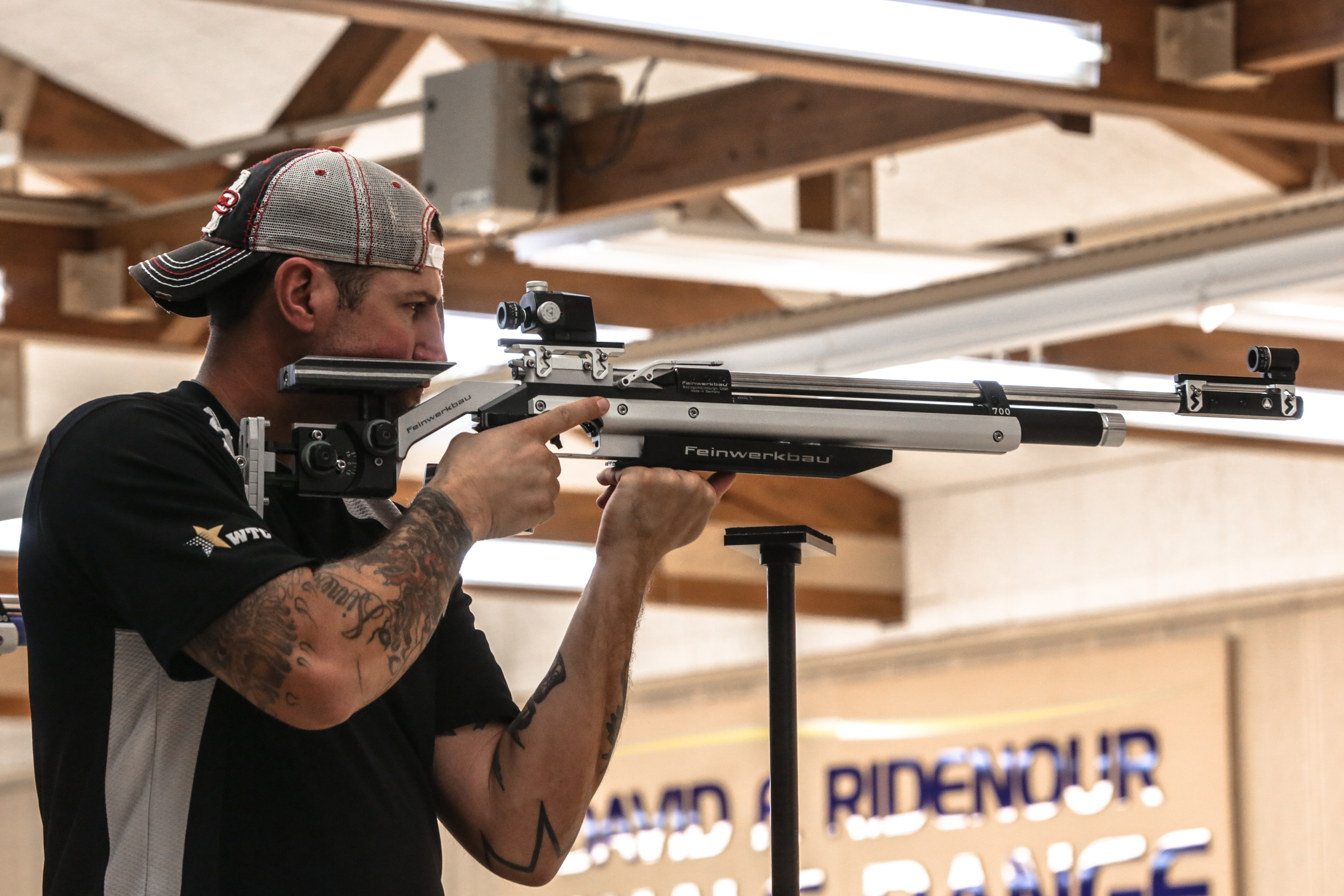
Competitor using a FWB P700 4.5mm PCP target rifle at the 2014 Warrior Games

- FWB 110 4.5mm target rifle, sidelever springer
- FWB 124 4.5mm air rifle, >800fps
- FWB 127 5.5mm version of the FWB 124
- FWB 150 4.5mm target rifle, sidelever springer, manufactured ??-1968
- FWB 300 4.5mm target rifle, sidelever springer, recoilless
- FWB 300 S 4.5mm target rifle, sidelever springer, recoilless
- FWB 600/601/602/603 4.5mm target rifle, sidelever, Single Stroke Pneumatic (SSP)
- FWB P70 4.5mm target rifle, Pre-Charged Pneumatic (PCP)
- FWB P700 4.5mm target rifle, Pre-Charged Pneumatic (PCP)
- FWB P800X 4.5mm target rifle, Pre-Charged Pneumatic (PCP)

== Air pistols ==
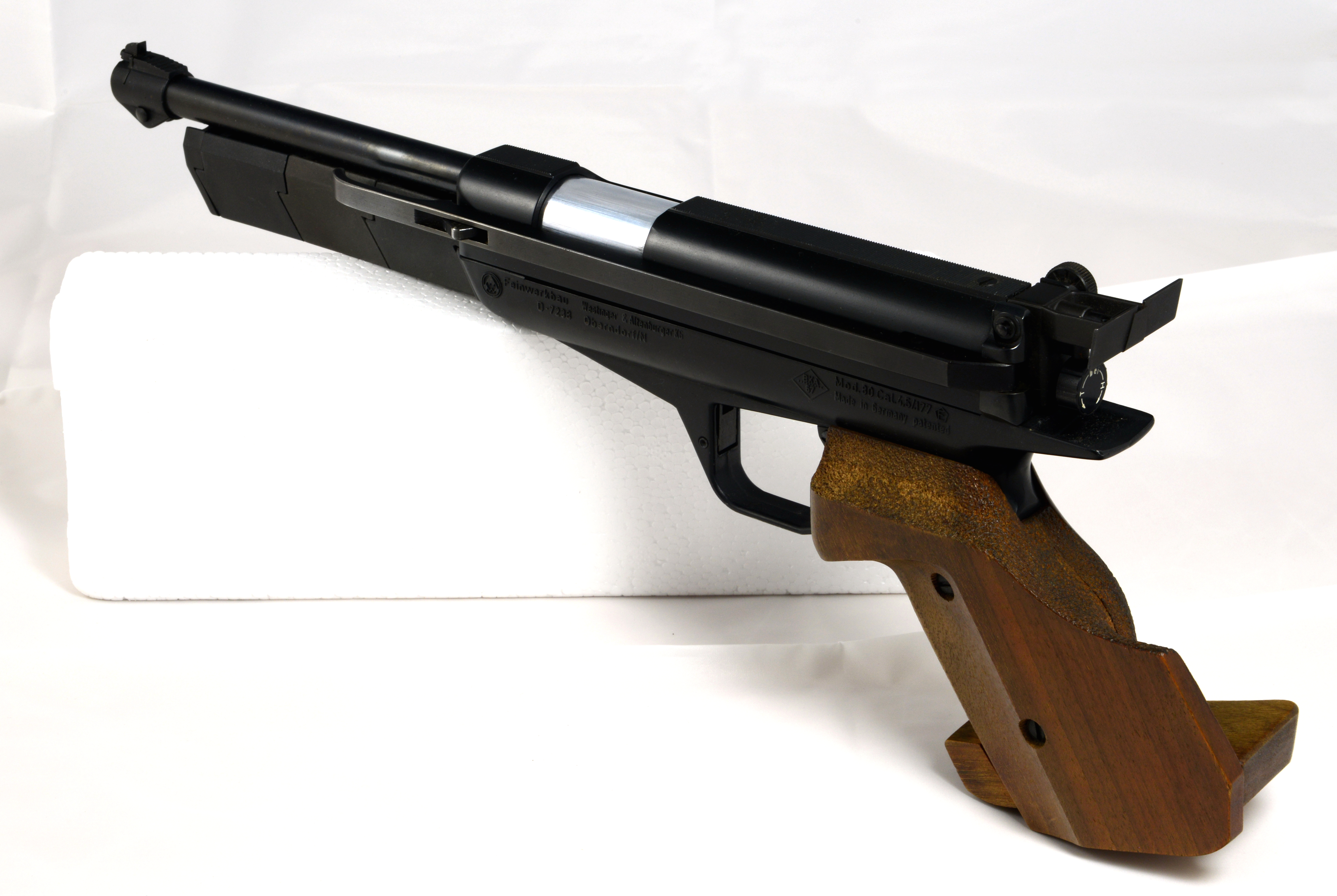
Feinwerkbau, Mod. 80

- 65 recoilless, 4.5mm match pistol, single lever, single stroke springer
- 80 recoilless, 4.5mm match pistol, single lever, single stroke springer
- 90 recoilless, 4.5mm match pistol, single lever, single stroke springer, electronic trigger
- FWB 100 match pistol, single lever, single stroke pneumatic, introduced in 1988
- FWB 102 match pistol, dual lever, single stroke pneumatic, introduced in 1992 replacing the FWB 100
- FWB 103 match pistol, removable single lever, single stroke pneumatic, introduced in 1997 replacing the FWB 102
- Model 2 4.5mm match pistol, CO_{2}
- C-10 4.5mm match pistol, CO_{2}
- C-20 4.5mm match pistol, CO_{2}
- C-25 4.5mm match pistol, CO_{2}
- P30 4.5mm match pistol, PCP
- P34 4.5mm match pistol, PCP
- P40 4.5mm match pistol, PCP
- P44 4.5mm match pistol, PCP
- P8X 4.5mm match pistol, PCP
- C5 4.5mm, 5-shot self-indexing match pistol, CO_{2}
- C55 4.5mm, 5-shot self-indexing match pistol, CO_{2}
- C55P 4.5mm, 5-shot self-indexing match pistol, PCP
- P55 4.5mm, 5-shot self-indexing match pistol, PCP
- P56 4.5mm, 5-shot self-indexing match pistol, PCP
- P58 4.5mm, 5-shot self-indexing match pistol, PCP

== Target pistols ==
- AW93 .22 LR
