= Bhagwatipur, Mainpuri =

Village in Uttar Pradesh, India

Bhagwatipur
- Village
- Location in Uttar Pradesh, India
- Coordinates: 27.08799°N 78.90093°E
- Country: India
- State: Uttar Pradesh
- District: Mainpuri
- Tehsil: Karhal

Area
  - Total: 4.62 km^{2} (1.78 sq mi)

Population (2011)
  - Total: 1,087
  - Density: 235/km^{2} (609/sq mi)
- Time zone: UTC+5:30 (IST)

Bhagwatipur (Bhagwatīpur) is a village in Barnahal block of Mainpuri district, Uttar Pradesh. As of 2011, it has a population of 1,087, in 192 households.

== Demographics ==
As of 2011, Bhagwatipur had a population of 1,087, in 192 households. This population was 51.8% male (563) and 48.2% female (524). The 0-6 age group numbered 179 (92 male and 87 female), or 16.5% of the total population. 140 residents were members of Scheduled Castes, or 12.9% of the total.

The 1981 census recorded Bhagwatipur as having a population of 726 people, in 137 households.

The 1961 census recorded Bhagwatipur as comprising 5 hamlets, with a total population of 532 people (273 male and 259 female), in 110 households and 102 physical houses. The area of the village was given as 1,196 acres.

== Infrastructure ==
As of 2011, Bhagwatipur had 1 primary school and 1 medical clinic and dispensary. Drinking water was provided by tap, hand pump, and tube well/borehole; there were no public toilets. The village had a public library but no post office; there was at least some access to electricity for all purposes. Streets were made of both kachcha and pakka materials.
