= Three positions =

In rifle events in sports shooting

Standard 50m target: total Ø = 154.4 mm. 4 ring Ø = 106.4 mm. 9 ring Ø = 26.4 mm. 10 ring Ø = 10.4 mm

International Rifle events that occur in three positions are conducted with an equal number of shots fired from the Kneeling, Prone and Standing positions, although the order has changed over the years. Each of the three positions shot during the match has a fixed time limit that the shooter is able to shoot unlimited numbers of sighting shots and 10 or 20 shots for record.

In qualification rounds, shots are scored as integers, so each shot scores from 0-10 with no decimal points, while in finals shots are scored as decimal values (i.e. 9.8 instead of what would have been a 9 under integer scoring.) The center of the bullseye is commonly the 10 and the score drops points as it distances from the center. It is up to the organization's discretion to score using outside ring or inside ring scoring. Outside ring scoring measures what ring the hole breaks and measures accordingly. Inside ring scoring scores by determining whether the hole breaks the inside line of the bullseye.

== Types of three positions matches ==
The International Shooting Sport Federation (ISSF) recognizes four three-position events. Two of these events, both called 50 m Rifle, are shot in the Olympics, one for men, the other for women. The two Olympic events are shot with a rimfire rifle at 50m. The two three-position events not in the Olympics, 300 m Rifle and 300 m Standard Rifle, are shot with a centerfire rifle at a distance of 300m.

For the Olympic events, up until the 2016 Olympic Games, men would shoot a 3 X 40, or rather 40 shots in prone, 40 shots in standing, and 40 shots in kneeling, and women a 3 X 20, 20 shots in each position. This is considered the qualification round, and shots are scored as integers. In January 2018, these rules were changed so that men and women now both shoot a 3x40. The maximum qualification score is 1200. This will first be seen in the Olympic Games in 2020. Following the qualification round, the top eight shooters participate in a final. Previously, this would consist of an additional 10 shots in the standing position, with the winner of the match being the shooter with the highest aggregate in both the qualification round and the final. However, in 2013 a new finals format was introduced, still for the top eight shooters in the qualification round. Both men and women shoot an additional 45 shots - 15 in each position - and qualification scores are discarded. The 15 shots in kneeling position come first, followed by the 15 prone shots, then once 10 standing shots have been fired, the two lowest-ranking shooters are eliminated, then after every single shot thereafter the lowest-ranked shooter is again eliminated until the 15th shot decides the gold and silver medalists.

The two non-Olympic 300m three position events are shot historically by men only. The first course of fire is with a free rifle, for a 3 X 40. The second course of fire is with a standard rifle, for a 3 X 20. Neither of these events have a final. The 300m events are no longer in the Olympics primarily due to the price of constructing a 300m range.

In the United States, a coalition of the Civilian Marksmanship Program (CMP), USA Shooting, JROTC, 4-H, and the American Legion recognize three position events for juniors using air rifles. The course of fire is a 3 X 20, or 3 X 10, depending on the organization and location, with the top eight shooters competing in a final. The winner is again the shooter with the highest aggregate between the qualification round and the final. In most cases junior shooting is done at either 10m or 50 ft. distances. The CMP manages these matches for the National Three-Position Air Rifle Council, and recognizes the best junior shooters via the Distinguished program.

== Shooting a three Position Match ==
At the beginning of a standard match the range officer will go over the rules of the range and the competition. They will state the course of fire and any change over times. In between each string of shooting the range will generally give about 10-minute change over time to get ready for the next position. During this time shooters can get their spotting scope set up, adjust rifle butt plates, or anything else without handling or shouldering the rifle. In addition to this time the range officer may also give a three-minute prep time for shooters to shoulder their rifle and do their last changes before the string starts. When the range officer gives the command to commence firing the timer is started for the match being shot. Shooters start by shooting sighting shots to ensure the rifle is sighted in and boost the confidence of the shooter. Shooters use a simple spotting scope to review their shots and adjust accordingly. The scopes come very useful for seeing any patterns with their shots or any missed bulls eyes. When the shooter has finished shooting all the shots for record they must wait for the range officer instructions to begin preparing for the next position.

== Types ==
The kneeling, prone and standing positions all are equally as important when shooting a three position match. Each count for the same number of points and have specific guidelines for each position. In ISSF three position matches, the first position is kneeling, followed by prone and then standing.

=== Kneeling ===
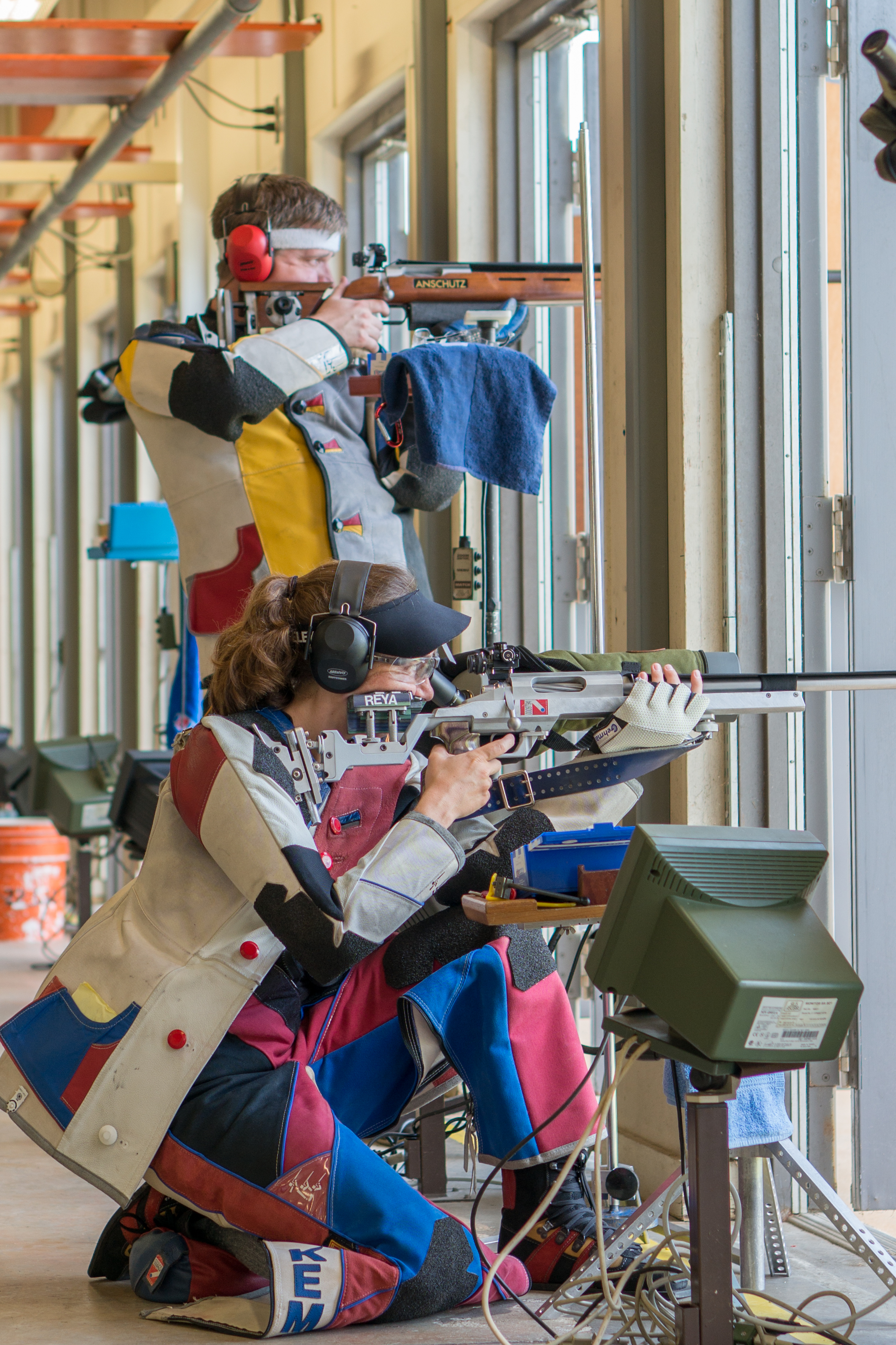
Kneeling and Standing Position

The first position in a three positions match is the kneeling position. Shooters generally use a kneeling roll and place it under the rear foot while aiming downrange. They sit on their rear foot and the other foot is pointed downrange. Shooters are allowed to use a sling just like the prone position. This sling is extremely important for creating a stable position. For many shooters kneeling begins as a struggle. With practice each shooter finds different keys for their position to make the most comfortable and stable position. There is a great fluctuation in scores and often depends on the stability and comfort of the shooters position.

=== Prone ===
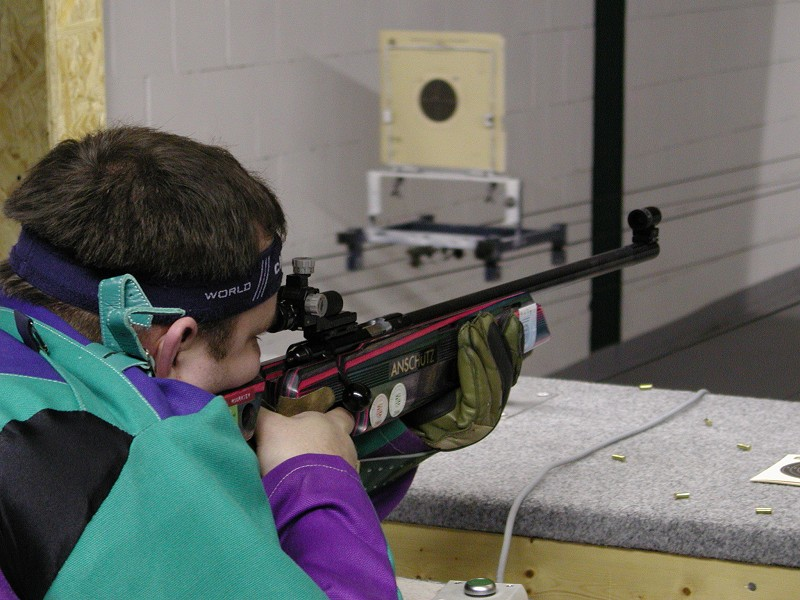
Prone Position

The prone position comes second in the match and is often the first learned shooting position. The prone position is the easiest to master and is often easy to sight in rifles using this position due to its stability. The added stability that this position gives the shooter makes this position, in most cases, the easiest to learn and typically is the highest scoring string of the match. Shooters are able to use a “sling” to support the rifle. The sling is a belt like device that goes around the non-shooting bicep and wraps around the wrist and attaches to the handstop of the rifle. This gives support so the sling holds up the weight instead of your arms.

=== Standing ===
The standing position is the final part of the three position match. This position is the hardest to master in most cases. Most competitors have a standing stand that they rest the rifle on then pick up to aim down range. The standing position is a freestanding position. For more stability it is common for shooters to place a fist or grip the rifle near or under the trigger guard and place their forearm against their body. Natural point of aim is especially crucial in this position. Natural point of aim is where your body is naturally aiming at while aiming downrange. If shooters fight their natural point of aim it is very difficult to stay stable and make a good shot. There are many tricks for finding a shooters natural point of aim and can be very difficult to teach to new shooters.

== See also ==
- ISSF shooting events
