= National Rifle Association of India =

Sports governing body in India

- Sport: Shooting
- Jurisdiction: India
- Abbreviation: NRAI
- Founded: 1951; 75 years ago
- Affiliation: International Shooting Sport Federation
- Regional affiliation: Asian Shooting Confederation
- Headquarters: New Delhi
- President: Kalikesh Narayan Singh Deo (2024–)
- (India)

The National Rifle Association of India was founded on 17 April, 1951 with a view to promote and popularize the shooting sports in India as well as for self-defense teaching purposes. The NRAI arranges national-level shooting competitions and the trials that determine which athletes will represent the country in international events. It is also responsible for identifying and nurturing talented shooters who compete in significant global competitions like the Olympic Games, Commonwealth Games, and Asian Games.

The first speaker of Lok Sabha, Sh. G.V. Mavlankar founded the NRAI and served as its inaugural president. He was succeeded by Sh. Govind Vallabh Pant, Sh. Lal Bahadur Shastri, Sh. Y. B. Chauhan, Sh. G.S. Dhillon, and Sh. Joginder Singh. In 2010, Raninder Singh took over the presidency. In 2024, Kalikesh Narayan Singh Deo became the new president after winning majority votes. He was formerly the Senior Vice President.

== Tournaments ==
The NRAI is affiliated to the Indian Olympic Association, the International Shooting Sport Federation, the Asian Shooting Confederation, the Commonwealth Shooting Federation and other international bodies. NRAI holds five national competitions annually with a view to promote and popularize the Sports of shooting in India:

- Shooting League of India
- National Shooting Championship Competitions (NSCC)
- All India G.V. Mavlankar Shooting Championship (AIGVMSC)
- Sardar Sajjan Singh Sethi Memorial Masters Shooting Championship
- Kumar Surendra Singh Memorial Shooting Championship
- All India Kumar Surendra Singh Memorial Inter School Shooting Championship

== International Performance ==
Shooting in India gained visibility when Abhinav Bindra won the Men's 10Metre Air Rifle at the 2008 Olympic Games. This was India's first ever Olympic gold medal in an individual sport.

== Shooting at the 2022 Commonwealth Games ==
In 2017, the Commonwealth Games Federation announced that the 2022 Commonwealth Games would no longer be held in Durban. The Games were awarded to Birmingham who chose not to include Shooting in the programme for the first time since 1970.

Following unsuccessful representations by the ISSF and British Shooting to have Shooting reinstated, the NRAI and IOA started plans to host a parallel Shooting competition in India and entered discussions with the CGF to have the medals included in Birmingham's medal table. The NRAI and IOA proposed full funding for the event, covering travel, accommodation expenses, and other costs for several hundred athletes. Proposals were also made to include Archery, which had not been included since the 2010 Commonwealth Games in Delhi. Initial plans were to host the event in Chandigarh, which would have required the construction of a new 1000yard fullbore range for the Queens shoot. The planned event - named the Commonwealth Shooting and Archery Championship - was cancelled in July 2021 due to ongoing concerns over COVID-19.

== See also ==
- Sport in India
- List of national, sports governing bodies of India
- India at the Olympics
