= Bhagwati Prasad (politician) =

Indian politician, MLA for Uttar Pradesh

Member of the Uttar Pradesh Legislative Assembly
- Constituency: Ikauna
- In office 1967–1969
- In office 1969–1974

Personal details
- Party: Bhartiya Jana Sangh

Bhagwati Prasad (died 9 July 2013) was an Indian politician who was elected MLA of Uttar Pradesh Legislative Assembly twice from Ikauna constituency. He represented the Bharatiya Jana Sangh Party from 1967 to 1969 and 1969–74. He had a very honest reputation and died in poverty after his family struggled to pay medical costs.
