= Shooting at the 2011 Pan American Games – Women's 10 metre air rifle =

Shooting – Women's 10 metre air rifle at the 2011 Pan American Games
- Venue: Pan American Shooting Polygon
- Dates: October 17
- Competitors: 29 from 16 nations

Medalists
Gold medal	Emily Caruso	United States
Silver medal	Eglys De La Cruz	Cuba
Bronze medal	Rosa Del Carmen Peña	Mexico

The women's 10 metre air rifle shooting event at the 2011 Pan American Games was held on October 17 at the Pan American Shooting Polygon in Guadalajara. The defending Pan American Games champion is Eglys De La Cruz of Cuba.

The event consisted of two rounds: a qualifier and a final. In the qualifier, each shooter fired 40 shots with an air rifle at 10 metres distance from the standing position. Scores for each shot were in increments of 1, with a maximum score of 10.

The top 8 shooters in the qualifying round moved on to the final round. There, they fired an additional 10 shots. These shots scored in increments of .1, with a maximum score of 10.9. The total score from all 50 shots was used to determine final ranking.

With the win Emily Caruso of the United States qualifies Canada a quota spot for the women's 10 metre air rifle event at the 2012 Summer Olympics in London, Great Britain.

== Schedule ==
All times are Central Standard Time (UTC−6).

Date	Time	Round
October 17, 2011	9:00	Qualification
October 17, 2011	14:00	Final

== Records ==
The existing world and Pan American Games records were as follows.

Qualification records
World record	Seo Sun-hwa (KOR); Gao Jing (CHN); Lioubov Galkina (RUS); Du Li (CHN); Lioubov Galkina (RUS); Suma Shirur (IND); Lioubov Galkina (RUS); Monika Haselsberger (AUT); Barbara Lechner (GER); Zhao Yinghui (CHN); Wu Liuxi (CHN); Du Li (CHN); Sonja Pfeilschifter (GER); Sonja Pfeilschifter (CZE); Lioubov Galkina (RUS); Liuxi Wu (CHN)	400	Sydney, Australia; Shanghai, China; Munich, Germany; Zagreb, Croatia; Munich, Germany; Kuala Lumpur, Malaysia; Bangkok, Thailand; Athens, Greece; Tallinn, Estonia; Changwon, South Korea; Munich, Germany; Granada, Spain; Milan, Italy; Beijing, China; Bangkok, Thailand; Wuxi, China	April 12, 2002; April 22, 2002; August 24, 2002; June 4, 2003; June 14, 2003; February 13, 2004; February 22, 2004; April 22, 2004; March 5, 2005; April 11, 2005; June 11, 2005; 4 October 2006; May 24, 2008; August 9, 2008; November 5, 2008; October 26, 2009
Pan American record	Eglys De La Cruz (CUB)	396	Santo Domingo, Dominican Republic	August 2, 2003

Final records
World record	Sonja Pfeilschifter (GER)	505.5 (500+105.5)	Milan, Italy	May 24, 2008
Pan American record	Kim Eagles (USA)	497.4 (396+101.4)	Santo Domingo, Dominican Republic	August 2, 2003

== Results ==
=== Qualification round ===
29 athletes from 16 countries competed.

Rank	Athlete	Country	1	2	3	4	Total	Notes
1	Emily Caruso	United States	98	100	100	100	396	Q, EPR
2	Eglys De La Cruz	Cuba	97	99	100	98	394	Q
3	Rosa Del Carmen Peña	Mexico	99	100	96	98	393	Q
4	Alexis Gabriela Martínez	Mexico	98	99	97	97	391	Q
5	Meghann Morrill	United States	96	99	98	98	391	Q
6	Sofia Padillia	Ecuador	95	99	99	98	391	Q
7	Marlil Romero	Venezuela	97	98	97	98	390	Q
8	Melissa Mikec	El Salvador	94	99	99	96	388	Q QS-Off 51.0 10.1
9	Dianelys Pérez	Cuba	98	97	95	98	388	QS-Off 51.0 10.0
10	Yarimar Mercado	Puerto Rico	100	94	97	97	388	QS-Off 50.8
11	Roberta De Almida	Brazil	98	97	97	96	388	QS-Off 49.4
12	Diliana Menendez	Venezuela	96	98	98	96	388	QS-Off 49.1
13	Monica Fyfe	Canada	98	97	99	94	388	QS-Off 48.8
14	Amy Bock	Puerto Rico	96	97	99	96	388	QS-Off 48.3
15	Amelia Fournel	Argentina	96	96	96	98	386	
16	Diana Velasco	Guatemala	97	99	95	93	384	
17	Carina Garcia	Bolivia	94	96	96	98	384	
18	Sara Vizcarra	Peru	96	98	93	97	384	
19	Johana Pineda	El Salvador	95	97	97	94	383	
20	Gladys Aguilera	Chile	96	96	94	97	383	
21	Karina Rodríguez	Peru	98	96	94	95	383	
22	Cristina De Mello	Brazil	94	94	98	97	383	
23	Gabriela Lobos	Chile	94	99	94	94	381	
24	Wendy Palomeque	Bolivia	98	95	97	91	381	
25	Cindy Hamulas	Canada	96	93	96	96	381	
26	Edna Monzon	Guatemala	95	95	94	96	380	
27	Maria De Los Reyes Cardellino	Argentina	91	96	95	96	378	
28	Edna Monzon	Uruguay	93	95	94	92	374	
29	Maziel Gonzalez	Dominican Republic	90	91	93	89	363	

=== Final ===
Rank	Athlete	Qual	1	2	3	4	5	6	7	8	9	10	Final	Total	Notes
1st place, gold medalist(s)	Emily Caruso (USA)	396	10.3	10.2	9.7	9.6	10.3	10.9	10.2	10.2	10.1	10.3	101.8	497.8	EPR
2nd place, silver medalist(s)	Eglys De La Cruz (CUB)	394	10.2	10.7	10.4	10.0	10.6	9.6	10.4	10.3	10.4	10.7	103.3	497.3	
3rd place, bronze medalist(s)	Rosa Del Carmen Peña (MEX)	393	9.5	10.0	10.7	10.6	9.9	10.0	10.3	9.9	10.3	10.5	101.7	494.7	
4	Meghann Morrill (USA)	391	9.5	10.6	9.8	10.5	10.7	9.2	10.8	10.1	10.2	10.2	101.6	492.6	
5	Sofia Padillia (ECU)	391	9.6	10.3	9.7	10.0	10.0	10.2	9.1	8.9	10.3	10.6	98.7	489.7	
6	Alexis Gabriela Martínez (MEX)	391	9.6	10.8	10.6	10.3	9.3	9.4	8.4	9.5	10.5	9.8	98.2	489.2	
7	Melissa Mikec (ESA)	388	10.6	10.0	10.3	10.0	10.8	9.8	10.4	9.5	9.3	10.3	101.0	489.0	
8	Editzy Pimentel (VEN)	390	9.9	10.4	9.3	10.3	10.3	10.3	10.2	9.0	9.3	10.0	99.0	489.0	
