= Shooting at the 2008 Summer Olympics – Women's 10 metre air rifle =

Women's 10 metre air rifle at the Games of the XXIX Olympiad
- Venue: Beijing Shooting Range Hall
- Date: August 9, 2008
- Competitors: 47 from 31 nations
- Winning score: 503.5 (OR)

Medalists
1st place, gold medalist(s)		Kateřina Emmons	Czech Republic
2nd place, silver medalist(s)		Lioubov Galkina	Russia
3rd place, bronze medalist(s)		Snježana Pejčić	Croatia

The Women's 10 metre air rifle event at the 2008 Olympic Games took place on August 9 at the Beijing Shooting Range Hall. It was the first medal awarded at the 2008 Olympic Games. Kateřina Emmons, who won a bronze medal in Athens four years earlier (then known by her maiden name Kůrková), now went all the way to a gold medal, after becoming the first shooter ever to achieve maximum qualification score (400) in an Olympic air rifle competition.

The event consisted of two rounds: a qualifier and a final. In the qualifier, each shooter fired 40 shots with an air rifle at 10 metres distance from the standing position. Scores for each shot were in increments of 1, with a maximum score of 10.

The top 8 shooters in the qualifying round moved on to the final round. There, they fired an additional 10 shots. These shots scored in increments of .1, with a maximum score of 10.9. The total score from all 50 shots was used to determine final ranking.

== Records ==
Prior to this competition, the existing world and Olympic records were as follows.

Qualification records
World record	Seo Sun-hwa (KOR); Gao Jing (CHN); Lioubov Galkina (RUS); Du Li (CHN); Lioubov Galkina (RUS); Suma Shirur (IND); Lioubov Galkina (RUS); Monika Haselsberger (AUT); Barbara Lechner (GER); Zhao Yinghui (CHN); Wu Liuxi (CHN); Du Li (CHN); Sonja Pfeilschifter (GER)	400	Sydney, Australia; Shanghai, China; Munich, Germany; Zagreb, Croatia; Munich, Germany; Kuala Lumpur, Malaysia; Bangkok, Thailand; Athens, Greece; Tallinn, Estonia; Changwon, South Korea; Munich, Germany; Granada, Spain; Milan, Italy	12 April 2002; 22 April 2002; 24 August 2002; 4 June 2003; 14 June 2003; 13 February 2004; 22 February 2004; 22 April 2004; 5 March 2005; 11 April 2005; 11 June 2005; 4 October 2006; 24 May 2008
Olympic record	Lioubov Galkina (RUS)	399	Athens, Greece	14 August 2004

Final records
World record	Sonja Pfeilschifter (GER)	505.0 (400+105.0)	Milan, Italy	24 May 2008
Olympic record	Du Li (CHN)	502.0 (398+104.0)	Athens, Greece	14 August 2004

During the competition, Kateřina Emmons equalled the world record for the qualification round, setting a new Olympic record of maximum 400 points, and then raised the Olympic final record by 1.5 points to 503.5. Silver medalist Lioubov Galkina also surpassed the old Olympic final record.

== Qualification round ==
The qualification round was held between 08:30 and 09:45 China Standard Time (UTC+8), with all shooters fitting into a single relay. It was the first competition event after the opening ceremony (although some football matches had been played before it).

Rank	Athlete	Country	1	2	3	4	Total	Notes
1	Kateřina Emmons	Czech Republic	100	100	100	100	400	Q EWR OR
2	Lioubov Galkina	Russia	99	100	100	100	399	Q
3	Snježana Pejčić	Croatia	99	100	100	100	399	Q
4	Du Li	China	100	100	100	99	399	Q
5	Jamie Beyerle	United States	98	99	100	100	397	Q
6	Olga Dovgun	Kazakhstan	98	99	100	100	397	Q
7	Sylwia Bogacka	Poland	98	99	100	100	397	Q
8	Marie Laure Gigon	France	99	99	98	100	396	Q
9	Daniela Pešková	Slovakia	100	98	98	100	396	
10	Kim Chan-mi	South Korea	98	99	100	99	396	
11	Eglis Yaima Cruz	Cuba	100	98	100	98	396	
12	Sonja Pfeilschifter	Germany	100	100	98	98	396	
13	Kim Yeo-oul	South Korea	98	100	98	99	395	
14	Kristina Vestveit	Norway	99	99	98	99	395	
15	Emily Caruso	United States	98	100	100	97	395	
16	Irene Beyeler	Switzerland	99	100	99	97	395	
17	Barbara Lechner	Germany	98	97	100	99	394	
18	Olga Desyatskaya	Russia	97	99	99	99	394	
19	Laurence Brize	France	99	98	98	99	394	
20	Lidija Mihajlović	Serbia	99	97	100	99	394	
21	Hanna Etula	Finland	98	99	99	98	394	
22	Zorigtyn Batkhuyag	Mongolia	98	99	100	97	394	
23	Shaimaa Abdel-Latif-Hashad	Egypt	96	98	99	100	393	
24	Yosheefin Prasasti	Indonesia	97	98	98	100	393	
25	Agnieszka Staroń	Poland	99	96	99	99	393	
26	Desislava Balabanova	Bulgaria	99	97	98	99	393	
27	Natallia Kalnysh	Ukraine	97	100	98	98	393	
28	Valentina Turisini	Italy	99	99	97	98	393	
29	Anjali Bhagwat	India	99	99	97	98	393	
30	Suzana Cimbal Špirelja	Croatia	99	99	99	96	393	
31	Pavla Kalná	Czech Republic	97	97	98	100	392	
32	Elena Kuznetsova	Uzbekistan	98	99	99	97	392	
33	Annik Marguet	Switzerland	97	96	98	100	391	
34	Gyda Olssen	Norway	97	98	97	99	391	
35	Anita Toth	Hungary	96	99	97	98	390	
36	Sasithorn Hongprasert	Thailand	99	97	97	97	390	
37	Zhao Yinghui	China	96	98	97	98	389	
38	Marjo Yli-Kiikka	Finland	98	98	96	97	389	
39	Avneet Sidhu	India	98	100	96	95	389	
40	Thanyalak Chotphibunsin	Thailand	98	97	97	96	388	
41	Fabienne Pasetti	Monaco	94	98	98	97	387	
42	Susan McCready	Australia	97	94	96	99	386	
43	Diliana Méndez	Venezuela	94	97	98	97	386	
44	Robyn van Nus	Australia	94	96	97	97	384	
45	Dariya Sharipova	Ukraine	97	96	97	94	384	
46	Phool Maya Kyapchhaki	Nepal	93	96	97	94	380	
47	Yekaterina Arabova	Turkmenistan	93	94	94	95	376	

EWR Equalled world record – OR Olympic record – Q Qualified for final

== Final ==
The final was held at 10:30 China Standard Time (UTC+8), and about 20 minutes later the first medalists of the Games were known.

Rank	Athlete	Qual	1	2	3	4	5	6	7	8	9	10	Final	Total	Notes
1	Kateřina Emmons (CZE)	400	10.6	10.7	9.7	10.9	10.2	10.4	10.6	10.3	10.2	9.9	103.5	503.5	OR
2	Lioubov Galkina (RUS)	399	10.7	10.3	9.5	10.2	10.1	10.7	10.3	10.6	10.7	10.0	103.1	502.1	
3	Snježana Pejčić (CRO)	399	10.6	10.5	10.6	10.0	10.5	9.8	10.3	9.7	9.8	10.1	101.9	500.9	
4	Jamie Beyerle (USA)	397	10.6	9.6	10.3	10.4	10.0	10.7	9.9	10.4	10.8	10.1	102.8	499.8	
5	Du Li (CHN)	399	9.8	10.0	10.1	10.4	10.1	10.0	9.7	10.0	10.4	10.1	100.6	499.6	
6	Olga Dovgun (KAZ)	397	10.2	10.1	9.8	10.6	10.0	9.7	10.5	10.6	9.9	9.8	101.1	498.1	
7	Marie Laure Gigon (FRA)	396	10.3	9.6	10.4	10.7	10.7	9.9	10.5	10.2	9.8	9.2	101.3	497.3	
8	Sylwia Bogacka (POL)	397	10.1	9.8	9.7	9.6	9.9	10.3	9.8	9.9	10.3	9.2	98.7	495.7	

OR Olympic record
