= Shooting at the 2006 Asian Games – Women's 10 metre air rifle =

Women's 10 metre air rifle at the 2006 Asian Games
- Venue: Lusail Shooting Range
- Dates: 2 December 2006
- Competitors: 54 from 20 nations

Medalists
gold medal	Du Li	China
silver medal	Zhao Yinghui	China
bronze medal	Olga Dovgun	Kazakhstan

The women's 10 metre air rifle competition at the 2006 Asian Games in Doha, Qatar was held on 2 December, at the Lusail Shooting Range.

== Schedule ==
All times are Arabia Standard Time (UTC+03:00)

Date	Time	Event
Saturday, 2 December 2006	10:15	Qualification
Saturday, 2 December 2006	15:00	Final

== Records ==
Prior to this competition, the existing world, Asian and Games records were as follows.

Qualification
World Record	Seo Sun-hwa (KOR)	400	Sydney, Australia	12 April 2002
Asian Record	Seo Sun-hwa (KOR)	400	Sydney, Australia	12 April 2002
Games Record	Zhao Yinghui (CHN); Park Un-kyong (KOR)	399	Busan, South Korea	2 October 2002
Final
World Record	Du Li (CHN)	504.9	Zagreb, Croatia	4 June 2003
Asian Record	Du Li (CHN)	504.9	Zagreb, Croatia	4 June 2003
Games Record	Zhao Yinghui (CHN)	501.4	Busan, South Korea	2 October 2002

== Results ==
=== Qualification ===
Rank	Athlete	Series				Total	Notes
Rank	Athlete	1	2	3	4	Total	Notes
1	Du Li (CHN)	99	100	100	99	398	
2	Wu Liuxi (CHN)	99	99	99	100	397	
3	Zhao Yinghui (CHN)	100	98	99	100	397	
4	Olga Dovgun (KAZ)	99	99	100	99	397	
5	Jasmine Ser (SIN)	99	99	98	100	396	
6	Avneet Sidhu (IND)	99	99	99	99	396	
7	Maryam Arzouqi (KUW)	99	100	99	98	396	
8	Tejaswini Sawant (IND)	98	99	98	100	395	
9	Thanyalak Chotphibunsin (THA)	98	98	98	100	394	
10	Vanessa Yong (SIN)	97	99	100	98	394	
11	Adrienne Ser (SIN)	98	98	98	99	393	
12	Damdinsürengiin Lkhamsüren (MGL)	98	99	97	99	393	
13	Yana Fatkhi (UZB)	97	99	99	98	393	
14	Thẩm Thúy Hồng (VIE)	99	98	98	98	393	
15	Gu Su-ra (KOR)	98	99	99	97	393	
16	Zorigtyn Batkhuyag (MGL)	98	97	98	99	392	
17	Muslifah Zulkifli (MAS)	98	97	97	99	391	
18	Lee Hye-jin (KOR)	96	98	100	97	391	
19	Chuluunbadrakhyn Narantuyaa (MGL)	98	98	98	97	391	
20	Sakina Mamedova (UZB)	99	98	99	95	391	
21	Na Yoon-kyung (KOR)	95	98	98	99	390	
22	Puchaya Pusuwan (THA)	97	99	96	98	390	
23	Elaheh Ahmadi (IRI)	99	97	96	98	390	
24	Supamas Wankaew (THA)	95	99	99	97	390	
25	Suma Shirur (IND)	99	100	94	97	390	
26	Mahbubeh Akhlaghi (QAT)	97	97	98	97	389	
27	Seiko Iwata (JPN)	99	96	97	97	389	
28	Shaikha Al-Mohammed (QAT)	94	98	97	99	388	
29	Elena Kuznetsova (UZB)	96	98	96	98	388	
30	Yoko Minamoto (JPN)	97	97	96	98	388	
31	Sharmin Akhter (BAN)	97	98	96	97	388	
32	Galina Korchma (KAZ)	95	99	99	95	388	
33	Nur Suryani Taibi (MAS)	99	94	95	99	387	
34	Raya Zeineddine (SYR)	94	98	97	98	387	
35	Adelah Al-Baghli (KUW)	95	98	96	98	387	
36	Cynthia Karen Leong (MAS)	96	99	97	95	387	
37	Niran Arzouqi (KUW)	95	96	98	97	386	
38	Varvara Kovalenko (KAZ)	94	96	95	100	385	
39	Ruqaya Al-Rowaiei (BRN)	99	98	91	96	384	
40	Nguyễn Thị Hòa (VIE)	97	94	96	96	383	
41	Suraiya Akhter (BAN)	95	94	95	98	382	
42	Bhagawati Khari (NEP)	92	96	97	97	382	
43	Jehan Al-Magrabi (SYR)	96	95	96	95	382	
44	Reema Abdulla Yusuf (BRN)	97	95	95	94	381	
45	Phool Maya Kyapchhaki (NEP)	91	96	97	96	380	
46	Priyanthi Kumari (SRI)	95	96	93	95	379	
47	Yulia Kaleeva (KGZ)	94	97	96	92	379	
48	Đàm Thị Nga (VIE)	91	95	96	96	378	
49	Devika Ranasinghe (SRI)	96	92	97	92	377	
50	Aysha Suwaileh (BRN)	97	90	94	95	376	
51	Cholpon Tumenbaeva (KGZ)	91	93	98	94	376	
52	Huda Al-Muntasr (QAT)	94	95	93	94	376	
53	Asmita Rai (NEP)	96	96	96	87	375	
54	Rodaina Al-Magrabi (SYR)	94	90	92	88	364	

=== Final ===
Rank	Athlete	Qual.	Final											Total	S-off	Notes
Rank	Athlete	Qual.	1	2	3	4	5	6	7	8	9	10	Total	Total	S-off	Notes
1st place, gold medalist(s)	Du Li (CHN)	398	10.6	10.0	10.6	10.5	10.7	9.9	10.1	10.6	10.0	10.4	103.4	501.4		
2nd place, silver medalist(s)	Zhao Yinghui (CHN)	397	10.2	10.2	10.3	10.6	10.7	10.2	10.0	10.6	10.4	10.8	104.0	501.0		
3	Wu Liuxi (CHN)	397	10.4	10.5	10.3	10.6	10.4	10.5	10.2	10.1	10.5	9.9	103.4	500.4		
3rd place, bronze medalist(s)	Olga Dovgun (KAZ)	397	10.1	10.4	9.8	9.6	10.9	10.4	10.5	10.7	9.8	10.5	102.7	499.7		
5	Avneet Sidhu (IND)	396	9.9	10.2	9.9	10.6	9.7	10.6	10.5	10.5	10.1	10.6	102.6	498.6		
6	Maryam Arzouqi (KUW)	396	10.4	10.4	10.2	10.3	9.8	10.3	10.5	9.9	9.7	10.3	101.8	497.8		
7	Jasmine Ser (SIN)	396	9.8	9.5	10.6	9.3	9.6	10.8	10.6	10.6	10.6	10.3	101.7	497.7		
8	Tejaswini Sawant (IND)	395	10.3	10.4	9.8	10.8	9.9	10.3	10.1	9.8	10.5	10.2	102.1	497.1		

- Olga Dovgun was awarded bronze because of no three-medal sweep per country rule.
