= Shooting at the 2004 Summer Olympics – Women's 10 metre air rifle =

Women's 10 metre air rifle at the Games of the XXVIII Olympiad
- Venue: Markópoulo Olympic Shooting; Centre
- Date: August 14, 2004
- Competitors: 44 from 31 nations
- Winning score: 502.0 OR

Medalists
1st place, gold medalist(s)		Du Li	China
2nd place, silver medalist(s)		Lioubov Galkina	Russia
3rd place, bronze medalist(s)		Kateřina Kůrková	Czech Republic

The women's 10 metre air rifle competition at the 2004 Summer Olympics was held on August 14 at the Markópoulo Olympic Shooting Centre near Athens, Greece. Following a relatively new Olympic tradition, it was the first event to be concluded at these Games.

The event consisted of two rounds: a qualifier and a final. In the qualifier, each shooter fired 40 shots with an air rifle at 10 metres distance from the standing position. Scores for each shot were in increments of 1, with a maximum score of 10.

The top 8 shooters in the qualifying round moved on to the final round. There, they fired an additional 10 shots. These shots scored in increments of .1, with a maximum score of 10.9. The total score from all 50 shots was used to determine final ranking.

China's world record holder Du Li outscored a host of elite markswomen in the air rifle shooting final to notch the first gold medal at these Games, smashing a new Olympic record score of 502.0 points. Russia's Lioubov Galkina, who led the field by a full point into the final with 399, had to settle for the silver with a total score of 501.5 points, while Czech Republic's Kateřina Kůrková held off a daunting challenge from Zhao Yinghui (500.8) to rule out the Chinese supremacy in the medal haul for a bronze at 501.1, falling Zhao to a disappointing fourth by a 0.3-point deficit.

== Records ==
Prior to this competition, the existing world and Olympic records were as follows.

Qualification records
World record	Monika Haselsberger (AUT)	400	Athens, Greece	22 April 2004
Olympic record	Kang Cho-hyun (KOR)	397	Sydney, Australia	16 September 2000

Final records
World record	Du Li (CHN)	504.9 (400+104.9)	Zagreb, Croatia	4 June 2003
Olympic record	Yeo Kab-soon (KOR)	498.2 (396+102.2)	Barcelona, Spain	26 July 1992

== Qualification round ==
Rank	Athlete	Country	1	2	3	4	Total	Notes
1	Lioubov Galkina	Russia	99	100	100	100	399	Q, OR
2	Du Li	China	99	100	99	100	398	Q
3	Kateřina Kůrková	Czech Republic	100	99	99	100	398	Q
4	Zhao Yinghui	China	100	99	100	99	398	Q
5	Tatiana Goldobina	Russia	99	100	98	100	397	Q
6	Sonja Pfeilschifter	Germany	98	99	100	99	396	Q
7	Suma Shirur	India	99	98	100	99	396	Q
8	Laurence Brize	France	98	100	99	99	396	Q
9	Monika Haselsberger	Austria	99	99	99	99	396	
9	Renata Mauer-Różańska	Poland	99	99	100	98	396	
9	Emily Caruso	United States	100	99	100	97	396	
12	Olga Dovgun	Kazakhstan	100	98	100	97	395	
12	Valentina Turisini	Italy	99	99	98	99	395	
14	Cho Eun-young	South Korea	99	99	98	98	394	
14	Hattie Johnson	United States	99	99	97	99	394	
14	Éva Joó	Hungary	99	100	96	99	394	
14	Natallia Kalnysh	Ukraine	98	100	99	97	394	
14	Lessia Leskiv	Ukraine	97	98	100	99	394	
14	Agnieszka Staroń	Poland	98	99	98	99	394	
20	Anjali Bhagwat	India	96	100	98	99	393	
20	Patricia Rivas	El Salvador	97	98	100	98	393	
22	Dorothee Bauer	Germany	99	98	99	96	392	
22	Valérie Bellenoue	France	96	99	99	98	392	
22	Hiromi Misaki	Japan	99	96	100	97	392	
22	Yosheefin Prasasti	Indonesia	100	97	99	96	392	
22	Marjo Yli-Kiikka	Finland	98	99	98	97	392	
27	Gaby Bühlmann	Switzerland	100	97	96	98	391	
27	Dina Hosny	Egypt	99	96	98	98	391	
27	Susan McCready	Australia	97	98	97	99	391	
27	Seo Sun-hwa	South Korea	98	99	96	98	391	
27	Alexia Smirli	Greece	99	97	98	97	391	
32	Sabrina Sena	Italy	99	97	97	97	390	
33	Shaimaa Abdel-Latif	Egypt	97	96	95	100	388	
33	Daisy de Bock	Belgium	95	96	99	98	388	
33	Maria Faka	Greece	97	97	95	97	388	
33	Ann Spejlsgaard	Denmark	96	97	98	97	388	
37	Beáta Krzyzewsky	Hungary	95	97	97	98	387	
38	Pushpamali Ramanayake	Sri Lanka	97	96	98	95	386	
39	Eglis Yaima Cruz	Cuba	95	98	98	94	385	
40	Alyona Aksyonova	Uzbekistan	96	92	99	97	384	
41	Svitlana Kashchenko	Nicaragua	96	94	98	95	383	
41	Dawn Kobayashi	Jamaica	98	93	97	95	383	
43	Fabienne Pasetti	Monaco	95	98	96	93	382	
44	Divna Pešić	Macedonia	91	95	94	88	368	

== Final ==
Rank	Athlete	Qual	1	2	3	4	5	6	7	8	9	10	Final	Total	Notes
1st place, gold medalist(s)	Du Li (CHN)	398	9.4	10.6	10.7	10.4	10.4	10.1	10.2	10.8	10.8	10.6	104.0	502.0	OR
2nd place, silver medalist(s)	Lioubov Galkina (RUS)	399	10.2	10.1	10.1	10.0	10.2	10.8	10.8	10.0	10.6	9.7	102.5	501.5	
3rd place, bronze medalist(s)	Kateřina Kůrková (CZE)	398	9.6	10.3	10.5	10.7	10.2	10.2	10.2	10.1	10.6	10.7	103.1	501.1	
4	Zhao Yinghui (CHN)	398	9.7	10.4	10.0	10.1	10.2	10.4	10.2	10.6	10.6	10.6	102.8	500.8	
5	Tatiana Goldobina (RUS)	397	10.5	10.0	10.7	10.5	9.7	10.4	10.1	10.6	10.2	9.8	102.5	499.5	
6	Sonja Pfeilschifter (GER)	396	10.3	9.8	10.5	9.1	10.8	10.8	10.8	10.4	10.1	10.1	102.7	498.7	
7	Laurence Brize (FRA)	396	9.7	10.4	10.0	10.5	10.6	9.5	10.4	10.4	10.3	10.1	101.9	497.9	
8	Suma Shirur (IND)	396	9.8	10.1	10.4	10.2	10.2	9.2	10.6	10.3	10.1	10.3	101.2	497.2	
