= Shooting at the 2012 Summer Olympics – Women's 50 metre rifle three positions =

Women's 50 metre rifle three positions at the Games of the XXX Olympiad
- Venue: Royal Artillery Barracks
- Date: 4 August 2012
- Competitors: 47 from 33 nations
- Winning score: 691.9

Medalists
1st place, gold medalist(s)		Jamie Lynn Gray	United States
2nd place, silver medalist(s)		Ivana Maksimović	Serbia
3rd place, bronze medalist(s)		Adéla Sýkorová	Czech Republic

The Women's 50 metre rifle three positions event at the 2012 Olympic Games took place on 4 August 2012 at the Royal Artillery Barracks.

The event consisted of two rounds: a qualifier and a final. In the qualifier, each shooter fired 60 shots with a .22 Long Rifle at 50 metres distance. 20 shots were fired each from the standing, kneeling, and prone positions. Scores for each shot were in increments of 1, with a maximum score of 10.

The top 8 shooters in the qualifying round moved on to the final round. There, they fired an additional 10 shots, all from the standing position. These shots scored in increments of .1, with a maximum score of 10.9. The total score from all 70 shots was used to determine final ranking.

== Records ==
Prior to this competition, the existing world and Olympic records were as follows.

Qualification records
World record	Sonja Pfeilschifter (GER)	594	Munich, Germany	28 May 2006
Olympic record	Renata Mauer (POL)	589	Atlanta, United States	24 July 1996

Final records
World record	Sonja Pfeilschifter (GER)	698.0 (594+104.0)	Munich, Germany	28 May 2006
Olympic record	Du Li (CHN)	690.3 (589+101.3)	Beijing, China	14 August 2008

== Qualification round ==
Rank	Athlete	Country	1	2	PR	3	4	ST	5	6	KN	Total	SO	Notes
1	Jamie Lynn Gray	United States	98	100	198	99	99	198	98	98	196	592		Q, OR
2	Ivana Maksimović	Serbia	98	98	196	100	97	197	98	99	197	590		Q
3	Daria Vdovina	Russia	100	100	200	100	94	194	96	95	191	585		Q
4	Adéla Sýkorová	Czech Republic	96	99	195	98	98	196	97	96	193	584		Q
5	Agnieszka Nagay	Poland	99	98	197	98	95	193	97	97	194	584		Q
6	Snježana Pejčić	Croatia	97	96	193	99	96	195	98	98	196	584		Q
7	Barbara Engleder	Germany	100	97	197	98	96	194	93	99	192	583	49.8	Q
8	Sylwia Bogacka	Poland	98	98	196	95	99	194	96	97	196	583	49.6	Q
9	Li Peijing	China	100	98	198	94	95	189	99	97	196	583	47.8	
10	Na Yoon-Kyung	South Korea	98	99	197	96	95	191	98	97	195	583	46.9	
11	Stine Nielsen	Denmark	97	98	195	95	96	191	99	97	196	582		
12	Petra Zublasing	Italy	98	94	192	97	97	194	98	97	195	581		
13	Du Li	China	97	98	195	97	95	192	97	97	194	581		
14	Mahlagha Jambozorg	Iran	98	100	198	96	94	190	95	98	193	581		
15	Amanda Furrer	United States	97	99	196	96	93	189	100	96	196	581		
16	Eglys Yahima de la Cruz	Cuba	99	95	194	94	97	191	97	99	196	581		
17	Jeong Mi-Ra	South Korea	99	98	197	91	95	186	99	99	198	581		
18	Laurence Brize	France	98	98	196	97	97	194	97	94	191	581		
19	Sonja Pfeilschifter	Germany	98	100	198	98	98	196	95	92	187	581		
20	Malin Westerheim	Norway	97	98	195	91	96	187	97	100	197	579		
21	Dianelys Pérez	Cuba	98	99	197	96	93	189	98	95	193	579		
22	Sakina Mamedova	Uzbekistan	98	94	192	96	96	192	96	98	194	578		
23	Marjo Yli-Kiikka	Finland	98	99	197	96	91	187	96	98	194	578		
24	Olga Dovgun	Kazakhstan	99	98	197	94	92	186	97	98	195	578		
25	Émilie Évesque	France	97	99	196	94	95	189	98	95	193	578		
26	Daria Tykhova	Ukraine	98	99	197	97	93	190	97	93	190	577		
27	Andrea Arsović	Serbia	98	98	196	95	95	190	98	93	191	577		
28	Lioubov Galkina	Russia	96	95	191	97	97	194	96	96	192	577		
29	Xiang Wei Jasmine Ser	Singapore	97	97	194	95	95	190	96	97	193	577		
30	Petya Lukanova	Bulgaria	97	100	197	96	94	190	94	96	190	577		
31	Anzela Voronova	Estonia	99	98	197	89	96	185	97	97	194	576		
32	Kateřina Emmons	Czech Republic	99	99	198	98	95	193	93	92	185	576		
33	Azza Al Qasmi	Bahrain	98	98	196	95	95	190	95	95	190	576		
34	Daniela Pešková	Slovakia	99	96	195	97	95	192	94	95	189	576		
35	Elania Nardelli	Italy	99	97	196	95	96	191	94	93	187	574		
36	Živa Dvoršak	Slovenia	98	98	196	95	94	189	95	94	189	574		
37	Stephanie Obermoser	Austria	100	96	196	94	94	188	93	96	189	573		
38	Dariya Sharipova	Ukraine	94	96	190	97	98	195	94	94	188	573		
39	Alexis Martínez	Mexico	99	95	194	93	95	188	94	96	190	572		
40	Annik Marguet	Switzerland	97	99	196	91	92	183	94	97	191	570		
41	Robyn van Nus	Australia	95	100	195	92	95	187	96	92	188	570		
42	Jennifer McIntosh	Great Britain	97	97	194	91	96	187	94	95	189	570		
43	Elaheh Ahmadi	Iran	96	97	193	92	95	187	93	94	187	567		
44	Maryam Arzouqi	Kuwait	97	100	197	94	93	187	88	92	180	564		
45	Melissa Mikec	El Salvador	99	96	195	90	91	181	92	92	194	560		
46	Bahya Mansour Al-Hamad	Qatar	97	98	195	90	92	182	92	86	178	555		
–	Alethea Sedgman	Australia												DNS

== Final ==
Rank	Athlete	Qual	1	2	3	4	5	6	7	8	9	10	Final	Total	Notes
1st place, gold medalist(s)	Jamie Lynn Gray (USA)	592	10.5	9.2	10.3	10.1	9.6	10.5	10.0	10.0	8.9	10.8	99.9	691.9	OR
2nd place, silver medalist(s)	Ivana Maksimović (SRB)	590	9.3	10.3	10.2	9.5	9.3	10.9	9.2	10.1	9.6	9.1	97.5	687.5	
3rd place, bronze medalist(s)	Adéla Sýkorová (CZE)	584	10.5	8.8	9.9	10.3	10.5	9.9	10.7	8.0	10.2	10.2	99.0	683.0	
4	Sylwia Bogacka (POL)	583	9.7	10.4	9.8	9.9	10.2	9.5	9.7	9.4	10.2	10.1	98.9	681.9	
5	Snježana Pejčić (CRO)	584	10.0	10.2	10.6	9.4	10.4	9.7	8.7	9.7	9.9	9.3	97.9	681.9	
6	Barbara Engleder (GER)	583	10.2	8.6	9.7	10.4	9.7	10.8	9.7	9.3	9.8	9.6	97.8	680.8	
7	Daria Vdovina (RUS)	585	10.3	9.9	10.7	9.7	8.9	9.6	10.1	8.4	9.2	9.0	95.8	680.8	
8	Agnieszka Nagay (POL)	584	10.2	9.8	8.7	9.6	9.3	9.8	9.3	8.8	9.0	9.7	94.2	678.2	
