= Wu Liuxi =

Chinese sport shooter

Personal information
- Nationality: Chinese
- Born: December 16, 1984 (age 41) Weinan, Shaanxi, China
- Height: 1.64 m (5 ft 5 in)
- Weight: 57 kg (126 lb)

Sport
- Country: China
- Sport: Shooting
- Events: AR40 (10m air rifle); STR3X20 (50m rifle 3 positions)
Medal record
Event	1st	2nd	3rd
World Championships	-	1	-
World Cup Finals	3	1	1
Asian Games	-	1	2
World Championships
Silver medal – second place	2010 Munich	AR40
World Cup Finals
Gold medal – first place	2005 Munich	STR3X20
Gold medal – first place	2008 Bangkok	AR40
Gold medal – first place	2009 Wuxi	AR40
Silver medal – second place	2006 Granada	STR3X20
Bronze medal – third place	2005 Munich	AR40
Asian Games
Silver medal – second place	2010 Guangzhou	AR40
Bronze medal – third place	2006 Doha	AR40
Bronze medal – third place	2010 Guangzhou	STR3X20

Wu Liuxi (Chinese: 武柳希; pinyin: Wǔ Liǔxī; born December 16, 1984) is a Chinese sport shooter. Born in Weinan, Shaanxi, she competed in the 2004 and 2008 Summer Olympics.

== Career ==
Wu Liuxi was selected for the Shaanxi Provincial Shooting Team at the age of 20. She became known when she outperformed Zhao Yinghui and Du Li and tied the world record in women's air rifle with 400 points at the Fifth National Intercity Games. She was recruited for the national shooting team soon after that.

=== Major achievements ===
- 1995: Shaanxi Youth Sports Meet: First, women's 3*10 Shots Prone and 3*30 Shots Prone
- 1998: Shanxi 11th Sports Meet: First, women's air rifle, 386 points, national record
- 2002: National Championship Series (4th station): Second, women's 3*20
- 2003: National Championship Series (3rd station): First, women's air rifle
- 2003: Fifth National Intercity Games: First, women's air rifle
- 2003: National Championship Series (4th station): First, women's 3*20
- 2004: Malaysia Asian Championships: Third, women's air rifle

=== Olympic results ===
Event	2004	2008
50 metre rifle three positions	9th 578	8th 585+100.9

=== World records ===
Current world records held in 10 metre air rifle
Women	Qualification	400	Seo Sun-hwa (KOR); Gao Jing (CHN); Lioubov Galkina (RUS); Du Li (CHN); Lioubov Galkina (RUS); Suma Shirur (IND); Lioubov Galkina (RUS); Monika Haselsberger (AUT); Barbara Lechner (GER); Zhao Yinghui (CHN); Wu Liuxi (CHN); Du Li (CHN); Sonja Pfeilschifter (GER); Kateřina Emmons (CZE); Lioubov Galkina (RUS); Yi Siling (CHN)	12 April 2002; 22 April 2002; 24 August 2002; 4 June 2003; 14 June 2003; 13 February 2004; 22 February 2004; 22 April 2004; 5 March 2005; 11 April 2005; 11 June 2005; 4 October 2006; 24 May 2008; 9 August 2008; 5 November 2008; 1 August 2010	Sydney (AUS); Shanghai (CHN); Munich (GER); Zagreb (CRO); Munich (GER); Kuala Lumpur (MAS); Bangkok (THA); Athens (GRE); Tallinn (EST); Changwon (KOR); Munich (GER); Granada (ESP); Milan (ITA); Beijing (CHN); Bangkok (THA); Munich (GER)
Women	Teams	1196	China (Du, Wu, Zhao)	December 6, 2007	Kuwait City (KUW)
