= Sonja Pfeilschifter =

German rifle shooter (born 1971)

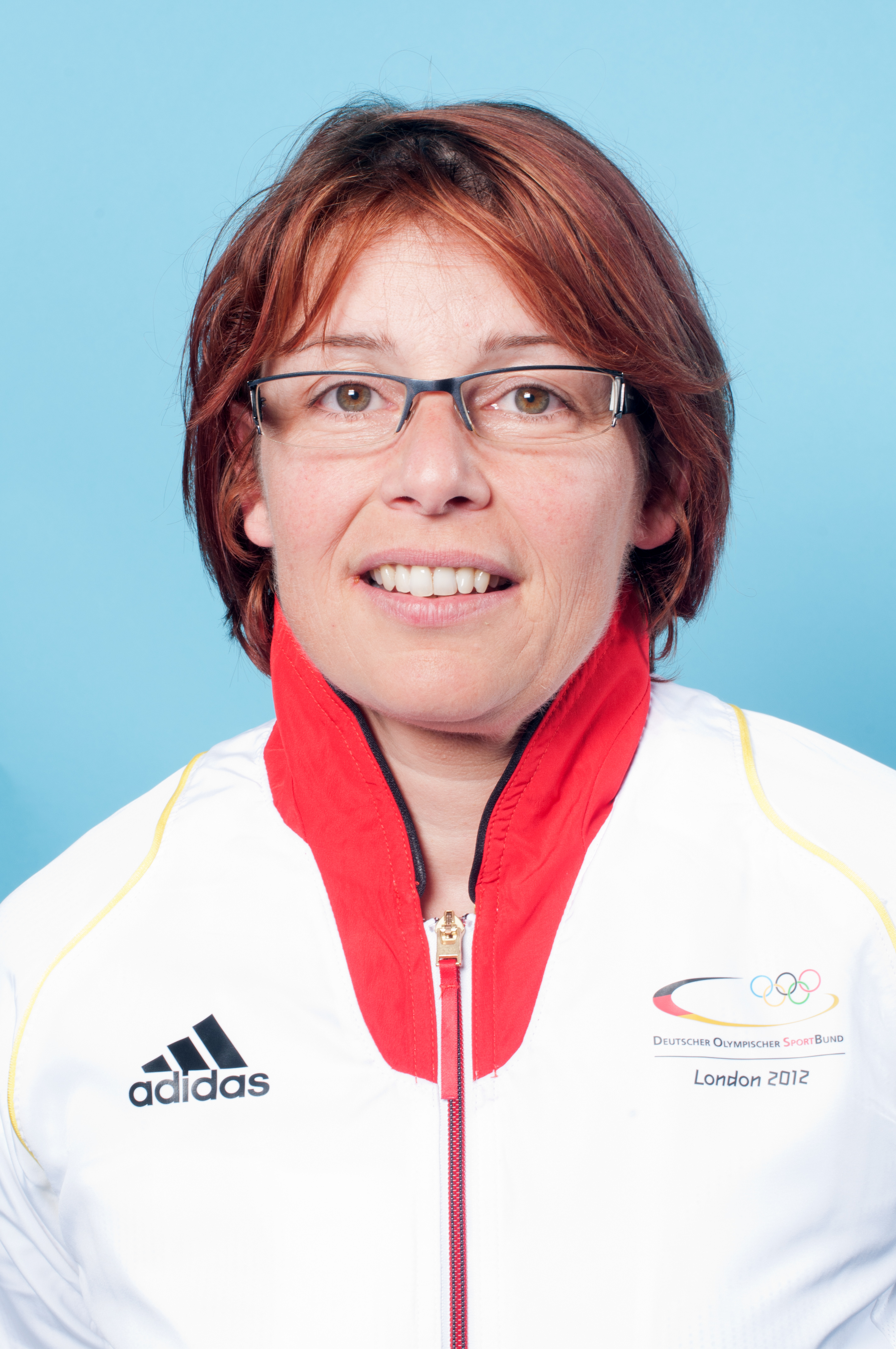

Personal information
- Nationality: Germany
- Born: 29 January 1971 (age 55) Cham, Bavaria, West Germany
- Height: 1.56 m (5 ft 1 in)
- Weight: 50 kg (110 lb)

Sport
- Sport: Shooting
- Event(s): AR40, STR3X20, STR60PR
- Club: SSG Dynamit Fürth
- Coached by: Hubert Bichler; Claus Dieter Roth
Medal record
World Championships
Gold medal – first place	1994	AR40
Gold medal – first place	1998	AR40
Gold medal – first place	1998	STR3X20
Silver medal – second place	2010	STR3X20
Bronze medal – third place	2002	AR40
Bronze medal – third place	2006	STR3X20
ISSF World Cup Final
Gold medal – first place	1999	AR40
Gold medal – first place	1999	STR3X20
Gold medal – first place	2000	AR40
Gold medal – first place	2001	AR40
Gold medal – first place	2008	STR3X20
Gold medal – first place	2010	AR40
Silver medal – second place	2003	STR3X20
Silver medal – second place	2011	AR40
Silver medal – second place	2011	STR3X20
Bronze medal – third place	1991	AR40
Bronze medal – third place	2004	STR3X20
Bronze medal – third place	2006	AR40
Bronze medal – third place	2006	STR3X20
Bronze medal – third place	2010	STR3X20
European Championships
Gold medal – first place	1999	AR40
Gold medal – first place	2001	AR40
Gold medal – first place	2001	STR3X20
Gold medal – first place	2001	STR60PR
Gold medal – first place	2002	AR40
Gold medal – first place	2005	STR60PR
Gold medal – first place	2011	AR40
Gold medal – first place	2011	STR3X20
Silver medal – second place	1997	STR3X20
Silver medal – second place	2003	STR3X20
Silver medal – second place	2004	AR40
Silver medal – second place	2006	AR40
Bronze medal – third place	2003	STR60PR
Bronze medal – third place	2007	AR40
Bronze medal – third place	2007	STR3X20
Bronze medal – third place	2009	STR3X20
Bronze medal – third place	2011	STR60PR

Sonja Pfeilschifter (born 29 January 1971) is a German rifle shooter. After winning the 1991 World Junior Championship in 10 metre air rifle, she won the World Championships of 1994 and 1998, in 1998 doubling with a victory in 50 metre rifle three positions. Still without Olympic medals, she has a very large number of victories at ISSF World Cups and she holds several world records.

== Olympic results ==
Event	1992	1996	2000	2004	2008	2012
50 metre rifle three positions	28th 569	—	4th 585+93.5	6th 582+97.6	17th 578	19th 581
10 metre air rifle	30th 386	—	5th 395+100.9	6th 396+102.7	12th 396	—

== Records ==
Current world records held in 50 metre rifle three positions
Women (ISSF)	Qualification	594	Snjezana Pejcic (CRO)	22 April 2016	Rio de Janeiro (BRA)
Women (ISSF)	Final	698.0	Sonja Pfeilschifter (GER) (594+104.0)	28 May 2006	Munich (GER)
Women (CISM)	Individual	1183	Yulia Karimova (RUS)	3 June 2018	Thun (SUI)
Women (CISM)	Teams	3499	China (Gao, Shi, Wan)	3 June 2018	Thun (SUI)
Current world records held in 50 metre rifle prone
Women (CISM)	Individual	625.5	Bae So-hee (KOR)	14 November 2016	Doha (QAT)
Women (CISM)	Teams	1861.0	China (Wan, Yin, Gao); Germany (Müller, Beer, Rachl)	14 November 2016; 14 November 2016	Doha (QAT); Doha (QAT)
Current world records held in 10 metre air rifle
Women	Qualification	400	Seo Sun-hwa (KOR); Gao Jing (CHN); Lioubov Galkina (RUS); Du Li (CHN); Lioubov Galkina (RUS); Suma Shirur (IND); Lioubov Galkina (RUS); Monika Haselsberger (AUT); Barbara Lechner (GER); Zhao Yinghui (CHN); Wu Liuxi (CHN); Du Li (CHN); Sonja Pfeilschifter (GER); Kateřina Emmons (CZE); Lioubov Galkina (RUS); Yi Siling (CHN)	12 April 2002; 22 April 2002; 24 August 2002; 4 June 2003; 14 June 2003; 13 February 2004; 22 February 2004; 22 April 2004; 5 March 2005; 11 April 2005; 11 June 2005; 4 October 2006; 24 May 2008; 9 August 2008; 5 November 2008; 1 August 2010	Sydney (AUS); Shanghai (CHN); Munich (GER); Zagreb (CRO); Munich (GER); Kuala Lumpur (MAS); Bangkok (THA); Athens (GRE); Tallinn (EST); Changwon (KOR); Munich (GER); Granada (ESP); Milan (ITA); Beijing (CHN); Bangkok (THA); Munich (GER)
Women	Final	505.6	Yi Siling (CHN) (400+105.6)	1 August 2010	Munich (GER)
