= Yi Siling =

Chinese sport shooter

Personal information
- Native name: 易思玲
- Nickname: Shooting Beauty
- Nationality: Chinese
- Born: May 6, 1989 (age 37) Guiyang County, Hunan, China
- Education: Zhuhai Sports School
- Height: 1.65 m (5 ft 5 in)
- Weight: 54 kg (119 lb)

Sport
- Country: China
- Sport: Shooting
- Events: AR40 (10m air rifle); STR3X20 (50m rifle 3 positions)
- Coached by: Qiuping Zhang
Medal record
Event	1st	2nd	3rd
Olympic Games	1	-	1
World Championships	1	-	-
Asian Games	1	-	-
Olympic Games
Gold medal – first place	2012 London	10m air rifle
Bronze medal – third place	2016 Rio de Janeiro	10m air rifle
World Championships
Gold medal – first place	2010 Munich	10m air rifle
Asian Games
Gold medal – first place	2010 Guangzhou	10m air rifle
Asian Championships
Gold medal – first place	2012 Doha	10 m air rifle
Gold medal – first place	2012 Doha	10 m air rifle team
Gold medal – first place	2015 Kuwait City	10 m air rifle
Gold medal – first place	2015 Kuwait City	10 m air rifle team

Yi Siling (Chinese: 易思玲; pinyin: Yì Sīlíng; born May 6, 1989, in Guiyang, Hunan) is a Chinese female sport shooter specializing in 10 meter air rifle events, she is the gold medalists for 2012 Olympics, 2010 World Championships and 2010 Asian Games. Yi started shooting in 2007 and made her international debut in 2009. In 2010, she won the World Championships at the 10m air rifle and became the first person to qualify for the 2012 Summer Olympics. At the Olympics, she captured the first gold medal of the games by winning the 10 m air rifle event.

== Athletic career ==
Yi Siling was born in Guiyang County, Chenzhou, Hunan, China. She joined Guangdong Province Shooting Team in 2007 after graduation from Zhuhai Sports School and made her international debut in 2009.

In 2009, Yi won silver at the Asian Championships in the 10m air rifle with a score of 502.9. The next year, she won the event at the 2010 Asian Games with a score of 504.9. Before the World Championships, she was diagnosed with kidney stones and had to undergo surgery. She made a full recovery and finished first at the World Championships with a score of 505.6. In the process, she set a new world record and became the first person to qualify for the 2012 Summer Olympics.

In 2011, Yi placed second at the Asian Championships in the 10 m air rifle with a score of 501.1. In 2012, she won the event with a score of 502.2.

Yi entered the 2012 Olympics ranked number one in the world at the 10 m air rifle. In Olympic competition she scored 399 out of a possible 400 in the preliminary round, tying for first place with Sylwia Bogacka. In the finals at the Royal Artillery Barracks, she turned in a score of 10+ on every shot, while Bogacka had a costly 9.7 on shot eight of ten. Thus, Yi out shot Sylwia Bogacka 103.9 to 103.2 in the finals to win the first gold medal of the 2012 Summer Olympics with a total score of 502.9. Of her victory, Yi commented "My stability help me a lot today and at the same time I think I'm quite lucky".

Including her Olympic win, Yi has won ten medals and made the finals 13 times in 16 career events. She planned to try to defend her gold at the next Olympics, but at the 2016 Olympics, she was only able to take home the bronze, with a score of 185.4 in the final.

== Personal life ==
Yi attended Zhuhai Sports School in Zhuhai, China for her education in 2004 after her dropped out school because of financial problem. In Zhuhai Sports School, everything for students were almost free. Before taking up shooting, she tried track and field and dancing. She is nicknamed "Shooting Beauty" due to her good looks.

After the 2012 Olympics, Yi said she planned to take a vacation and spend time with her family. "I have been away from home for more than a year and now I miss my family a lot," she said.

== Records ==
These records were made under the ISSR rules before its modification in 2013.

Current world records held in 10 metre air rifle
Women	Qualification	400	Seo Sun-hwa (KOR); Gao Jing (CHN); Lioubov Galkina (RUS); Du Li (CHN); Lioubov Galkina (RUS); Suma Shirur (IND); Lioubov Galkina (RUS); Monika Haselsberger (AUT); Barbara Lechner (GER); Zhao Yinghui (CHN); Wu Liuxi (CHN); Du Li (CHN); Sonja Pfeilschifter (GER); Kateřina Emmons (CZE); Lioubov Galkina (RUS); Yi Siling (CHN)	12 April 2002; 22 April 2002; 24 August 2002; 4 June 2003; 14 June 2003; 13 February 2004; 22 February 2004; 22 April 2004; 5 March 2005; 11 April 2005; 11 June 2005; 4 October 2006; 24 May 2008; 9 August 2008; 5 November 2008; 1 August 2010	Sydney (AUS); Shanghai (CHN); Munich (GER); Zagreb (CRO); Munich (GER); Kuala Lumpur (MAS); Bangkok (THA); Athens (GRE); Tallinn (EST); Changwon (KOR); Munich (GER); Granada (ESP); Milan (ITA); Beijing (CHN); Bangkok (THA); Munich (GER)
Women	Final	505.6	Yi Siling (CHN) (400+105.6)	1 August 2010	Munich (GER)

== See also ==
- China at the 2012 Summer Olympics
