= List of Olympic records in shooting =

This is a list of Olympic records in shooting, current after the 2024 Summer Olympics.

== Men's records ==
Event		Score	Name	Nation	Games	Date	Ref
50 m rifle three positions	Qual.	1180 ^{a}	Niccolò Campriani	Italy	(United Kingdom) 2012 London	6 August 2012	
50 m rifle three positions	Qual.	1184 ^{b}	Sergey Kamenskiy	Russia	(Brazil) 2016 Rio	14 August 2016	
50 m rifle three positions	Final	1287.5 (Total) ^{a}	Niccolò Campriani	Italy	(United Kingdom) 2012 London	6 August 2012	
50 m rifle three positions	Final	458.8 (Final) ^{b}	Niccolò Campriani	Italy	(Brazil) 2016 Rio	14 August 2016	
50 m rifle three positions	Final	1642.5 (Total) ^{b}	Sergey Kamenskiy	Russia	(Brazil) 2016 Rio	14 August 2016	
50 m rifle prone	Qual.	600 ^{a}	Christian Klees	Germany	(United States) 1996 Atlanta	25 July 1996	
50 m rifle prone	Qual.	629.0 ^{b}	Sergey Kamenskiy	Russia	(Brazil) 2016 Rio	12 August 2016	
50 m rifle prone	Final	705.5 ^{a}	Sergei Martynov	Belarus	(United Kingdom) 2012 London	3 August 2012	
50 m rifle prone	Final	209.5 ^{b}	Henri Junghänel	Germany	(Brazil) 2016 Rio	12 August 2016	
10 m air rifle	Qual.	599 ^{a}	Zhu Qinan	China	(Greece) 2004 Athens	16 August 2004	
10 m air rifle	Qual.	632.7 ^{b}	Yang Haoran	China	(Japan) 2020 Tokyo	25 July 2021	
10 m air rifle	Final	702.7 (Total) ^{a}	Zhu Qinan	China	(Greece) 2004 Athens	16 August 2004	
10 m air rifle	Final	206.1 (Final) ^{b}	Niccolò Campriani	Italy	(Brazil) 2016 Rio	6 August 2016	
10 m air rifle	Final	836.3 (Total) ^{b}	Niccolò Campriani	Italy	(Brazil) 2016 Rio	6 August 2016	
50 m pistol	Qual.	581	Aleksandr Melentiev	Soviet Union	(Soviet Union) 1980 Moscow	20 July 1980	
50 m pistol	Final	666.4 (Total) ^{a}	Boris Kokorev	Russia	(United States) 1996 Atlanta	23 July 1996	
50 m pistol	Final	193.7 (Final) ^{b}	Jin Jong-oh	South Korea	(Brazil) 2016 Rio	10 August 2016	
50 m pistol	Final	760.7 (Total) ^{b}	Jin Jong-oh	South Korea	(Brazil) 2016 Rio	10 August 2016	
25 m rapid fire pistol	Qual.	592	Alexei Klimov	Russia	(United Kingdom) 2012 London	3 August 2012	
25 m rapid fire pistol	Qual.	592	Christian Reitz	Germany	(Brazil) 2016 Rio	13 August 2016	
25 m rapid fire pistol	Final	34	Leuris Pupo	Cuba	(United Kingdom) 2012 London	3 August 2012	
25 m rapid fire pistol	Final	34	Christian Reitz	Germany	(Brazil) 2016 Rio	13 August 2016	
25 m rapid fire pistol	Final	34	Jean Quiquampoix	France	(Japan) 2020 Tokyo	2 August 2021	
10 m air pistol	Qual.	591	Mikhail Nestruyev	Russia	(Greece) 2004 Athens	14 August 2004	
10 m air pistol	Final	690.0 (Total)^{a}	Wang Yifu	China	(Greece) 2004 Athens	14 August 2004	
10 m air pistol	Final	202.5 (Final)	Hoàng Xuân Vinh	Vietnam	(Brazil) 2016 Rio	6 August 2016	
10 m air pistol	Final	783.5 (Total)	Hoàng Xuân Vinh	Vietnam	(Brazil) 2016 Rio	6 August 2016	
Trap	Qual.	125	Michael Diamond	Australia	(United Kingdom) 2012 London	6 August 2012	
Trap	Final	146 ^{a}	David Kostelecký; Giovanni Cernogoraz; Massimo Fabbrizi	Czech Republic; Croatia; Italy	(China) 2008 Beijing (United Kingdom) 2012 London (United Kingdom) 2012 London	10 August 2008; 6 August 2012; 6 August 2012	
Trap	Final	48 ^{b}	Nathan Hales	Great Britain	(France) 2024 Paris	30 July 2024	
Double trap	Qual.	145 ^{a}	Walton Eller	United States	(China) 2008 Beijing	12 August 2008	
Double trap	Qual.	140 ^{b}	Andreas Löw	Germany	(Brazil) 2016 Rio	10 August 2016	
Double trap	Qual.	140 ^{b}	James Willett	Australia	(Brazil) 2016 Rio	10 August 2016	
Double trap	Final	190	Walton Eller	United States	(China) 2008 Beijing	12 August 2008	
Skeet	Qual.	121 ^{a}	Vincent Hancock	United States	(China) 2008 Beijing	16 August 2008	
Skeet	Qual.	124 ^{b}	Éric Delaunay	France	(Japan) 2020 Tokyo	26 July 2021	
Skeet	Qual.	124 ^{b}	Tammaro Cassandro	Italy	(Japan) 2020 Tokyo	26 July 2021	
Skeet	Final	145 ^{a}	Vincent Hancock; Tore Brovold	United States; Norway	(China) 2008 Beijing	16 August 2008	
Skeet	Final	59 ^{b}	Vincent Hancock	United States	(Japan) 2020 Tokyo	26 July 2021	

== Women's records ==
Event		Score	Name	Nation	Games	Date	Ref
50 m rifle three positions	Qual.	592 ^{a}	Jamie Lynn Gray	United States	(United Kingdom) 2012 London	4 August 2012	
50 m rifle three positions	Qual.	589 ^{b}	Petra Zublasing	Italy	(Brazil) 2016 Rio	11 August 2016	
50 m rifle three positions	Final	691.9 ^{a}	Jamie Lynn Gray	United States	(United Kingdom) 2012 London	4 August 2012	
50 m rifle three positions	Final	458.6 ^{b}	Barbara Engleder	Germany	(Brazil) 2016 Rio	11 August 2016	
10 m air rifle	Qual.	400 ^{a}	Kateřina Emmons	Czech Republic	(China) 2008 Beijing	9 September 2008	
10 m air rifle	Qual.	420.7 ^{b}	Du Li	China	(Brazil) 2016 Rio	6 August 2016	
10 m air rifle	Final	103.5 (Final)	Kateřina Emmons	Czech Republic	(China) 2008 Beijing	9 August 2008	
10 m air rifle	Final	503.5 (Total)^{a}	Kateřina Emmons	Czech Republic	(China) 2008 Beijing	9 August 2008	
10 m air rifle	Final	208.0 (Final)	Virginia Thrasher	United States	(Brazil) 2016 Rio	6 August 2016	
10 m air rifle	Final	624.3 (Total)	Virginia Thrasher	United States	(Brazil) 2016 Rio	6 August 2016	
25 m pistol	Qual.	592	Zhang Jingjing	China	(Brazil) 2016 Rio	9 August 2016	
25 m pistol	Qual.	592	Veronika Major	Hungary	(France) 2024 Paris	2 August 2024	
25 m pistol	Final	793.4 ^{a}	Chen Ying	China	(China) 2008 Beijing	13 August 2008	
10 m air pistol	Qual.	391	Natalia Paderina	Russia	(China) 2008 Beijing	10 August 2008	
10 m air pistol	Final	492.3 (Total)^{a}	Guo Wenjun	China	(China) 2008 Beijing	10 August 2008	
10 m air pistol	Final	199.4 (Final)	Zhang Mengxue	China	(Brazil) 2016 Rio	7 August 2016	
10 m air pistol	Final	587.1 (Total)	Vitalina Batsarashkina	Russia	(Brazil) 2016 Rio	7 August 2016	
Trap	Qual.	75 ^{a}	Jessica Rossi	Italy	(United Kingdom) 2012 London	4 August 2012	
Trap	Qual.	125 ^{b}	Zuzana Rehák-Štefečeková	Slovakia	(Japan) 2020 Tokyo	28 July 2021	
Trap	Final	99	Jessica Rossi	Italy	(United Kingdom) 2012 London	4 August 2012	
Trap	Final	45 ^{b}	Adriana Ruano	Guatemala	(France) 2024 Paris	31 July 2024	
Skeet	Qual.	74 ^{a}	Kim Rhode	United States	(United Kingdom) 2012 London	29 July 2012	
Skeet	Qual.	73 ^{a}	Wei Meng	China	(Brazil) 2016 Rio	12 August 2016	
Skeet	Qual.	124 ^{b}	Wei Meng	China	(Japan) 2020 Tokyo	26 July 2021	
Skeet	Final	99 (74+25) ^{b}	Kim Rhode	United States	(United Kingdom) 2012 London	29 July 2012	
Skeet	Final	56 ^{b}	Amber English	United States	(Japan) 2020 Tokyo	26 July 2021	

== Notes ==
^a Old ISSF rule.
^b New ISSF rule.
