= Olga Desyatskaya =

Russian sport shooter (born 1987)

Personal information
- Full name: Olga Viktorovna Desyatskaya
- Nationality: Russia
- Born: 18 May 1987 (age 39) Bryansk, Russian SFSR
- Height: 1.63 m (5 ft 4 in)
- Weight: 53 kg (117 lb)

Sport
- Sport: Shooting
- Event(s): 10 m air rifle (AR40); 50 m rifle 3 positions (STR3X20)

Olga Viktorovna Desyatskaya (Russian: Ольга Викторовна Десятская; born May 18, 1987, in Bryansk) is a Russian sport shooter. She won a bronze medal for the 10 m air rifle at the 2008 European Shooting Championships in Winterthur, Switzerland, with a score of 500 points.

Desyatskaya represented Russia at the 2008 Summer Olympics in Beijing, where she competed in the women's 10 m air rifle, along with her teammate Lioubov Galkina, who eventually won the silver medal in the final. She finished only in eighteenth place by one point behind Germany's Barbara Lechner from the third attempt, for a total score of 394 targets.
