= Shimaa Hashad =

Egyptian sport shooter

Personal information
- Full name: Shaimaa Abdel-Latif-Hashad
- Nationality: Egypt
- Born: 21 April 1981 (age 45) Cairo, Egypt
- Height: 1.65 m (5 ft 5 in)
- Weight: 55 kg (121 lb)

Sport
- Sport: Shooting
- Event: 10 m air rifle (AR40)
- Club: Cairo Army Shooting Club
- Coached by: Mohmed Fayk

Shaimaa Abdel-Latif-Hashad (also Shimaa Hashad, Arabic: شيماء عبد اللطيف حشاد; born April 21, 1981, in Cairo) is an Egyptian sport shooter. She is a two-time Olympian, and a three-time medalist for the air rifle (AR40) at the African Shooting Championships.

Hashad made her official debut for the 2004 Summer Olympics in Athens, where she placed thirty-third in the women's 10 m air rifle, with a score of 388 points, tying her position with four other shooters including the host nation Greece's Maria Faka.

At the 2008 Summer Olympics in Beijing, Hashad competed for the second time in the women's 10 m air rifle. She finished only in twenty-third place by one point ahead of Indonesia's Yosheefin Prasasti from the third attempt, for a total score of 393 targets.
