= 2006 ISSF World Cup =

The 2006 ISSF World Cup was held in the fifteen Olympic shooting events. Four qualification events were held in each event, spanning from March to June, and the best shooters qualified for the ISSF World Cup Final in Granada, Spain in October. It was the first time in the history of the competition that the finals in all events were held at a single venue.

During the final in Granada, while defending her title in the women's Air Rifle competition, Chinese Du Li equalled the world record with a perfect 400 score, becoming the second woman in the world to achieve this for a second time. Also in the men's Air Rifle, Thomas Farnik of Austria set a new final world record with 703.1.

Alexei Klimov bettered the world record in 25 m Rapid Fire Pistol from 589 to 591 and won narrowly after losing most of his pre-final advantage.

In men's Trap, Czech David Kostelecky equalled the perfect world record of 125, but missed three targets in the final and eventually lost to Olympic and European champion Aleksei Alipov on shoot-off; both shooters also equalled the final world record.

== Winners ==
	WC 1	WC 2	WC 3	WC 4	Final
	Guangzhou, China	Resende, Brazil	Munich, Germany	Milan, Italy	Granada, Spain
	25 Mar – 02 Apr	25 Apr – 3 May	22 May – 29 May	29 May – 05 Jun	02 Oct – 08 Oct
Men's 50 m Rifle 3 Positions	Vebjørn Berg; Norway	Thomas Farnik; Austria	Sergei Kovalenko; Russia	Liu Zhiwei; China	Rajmond Debevec; Slovenia
Men's 50 m Rifle Prone	Sergei Martynov; Belarus	Thomas Tamas; United States	Péter Sidi; Hungary	Sergei Martynov; Belarus	Sergei Martynov; Belarus
Men's 10 m Air Rifle	Gagan Narang; India	Christian Planer; Austria	Jozef Gönci; Slovakia	Zhu Qinan; China	Thomas Farnik; Austria
Men's 50 m Pistol	Jin Jong Oh; South Korea	Mikhail Nestruev; Russia	Joao Costa; Portugal	Xu Kun; China	Vladimir Isakov; Russia
Men's 25 m Rapid Fire Pistol	Ralf Schumann; Germany	Oleksandr Petriv; Ukraine	Ralf Schumann; Germany	Ralf Schumann; Germany	Alexei Klimov; Russia
Men's 10 m Air Pistol	Jin Jong Oh; South Korea	Franck Dumoulin; France	Tan Zongliang; China	Tan Zongliang; China	Vladimir Gontcharov; Russia
Women's 50 m Rifle 3 Positions	Liu Bo; China	Tatiana Goldobina; Russia	Sonja Pfeilschifter; Germany	Wang Chengyi; China	Lioubov Galkina; Russia
Women's 10 m Air Rifle	Zhao Yinghui; China	Kateřina Kůrková; Czech Republic	Elsa Caputo; Italy	Du Li; China	Du Li; China
Women's 25 m Pistol	Lalita Yauhleuskaya; Australia	Jasna Šekarić; Serbia and Montenegro	Otryadyn Gündegmaa; Mongolia	Fei Fengji; China	Otryadyn Gündegmaa; Mongolia
Women's 10 m Air Pistol	Ren Jie; China	Jasna Šekarić; Serbia and Montenegro	Fei Fengji; China	Jasna Šekarić; Serbia and Montenegro	Natalia Paderina; Russia
	WC 1	WC 2	WC 3	WC 4	Final
	Qingyuan, China	Kerrville, United States	Cairo, Egypt	Suhl, Germany	Granada, Spain
	02 Apr – 11 Apr	4 May – 12 May	16 May – 25 May	06 Jun – 15 Jun	02 Oct – 08 Oct
Men's Trap	Massimo Fabbrizi; Italy	Aleksei Alipov; Russia	Stefan Ruettgeroth; Germany	Pavel Gurkin; Russia	Aleksei Alipov; Russia
Men's Double Trap	Vitaly Fokeev; Russia	Vasily Mosin; Russia	Rajyavardhan Singh Rathore; India	Hu Binyuan; China	Vitaly Fokeev; Russia
Men's Skeet	Qu Ridong; China	Ennio Falco; Italy	Axel Wegner; Germany	Tino Wenzel; Germany	Valeriy Shomin; Russia
Women's Trap	Zuzana Štefečeková; Slovakia	Zhu Mei; China	Zuzana Štefečeková; Slovakia	Satu Mäkelä-Nummela; Finland	Elena Tkach; Russia
Women's Skeet	Shi Hong Yan; China	Connie Smotek; United States	Danka Bartekova; Slovakia	Svetlana Demina; Russia	Chiara Cainero; Italy

=== Triple winners ===
- Ralf Schumann (GER) (RFP)
- Jasna Šekarić (SCG) (SP and AP40)
- Sergei Martynov (BLR) (FR60PR)

=== Double winners ===
- Jin Jong Oh (KOR) (FP and AP60)
- Zuzana Štefečeková (SVK) (TR75)
- Fei Fengji (CHN) (SP and AP40)
- Tan Zongliang (CHN) (AR60)
- Aleksei Alipov (RUS) (TR125)
- Otryadyn Gündegmaa (MGL) (SP)
- Vitaly Fokeev (RUS) (DT150)
- Thomas Farnik (AUT) (FR3X40 and AR60)
- Du Li (CHN) (AR40)

== See also ==
- 2006 ISSF World Shooting Championships
- Shooting at the 2008 Summer Olympics – Qualification
