= Kim Chan-mi =

- Hangul: 김찬미
- RR: Gim Chanmi
- MR: Kim Ch'anmi

Kim Chan-mi (Korean: 김찬미) is a Korean name consisting of the family name Kim and the given name Chan-mi, and may also refer to:

- Kim Chan-mi (sport shooter) (born 1989), South Korean sport shooter
- Kim Chanmi (singer) (born 1996), South Korean singer
