= Kateřina Emmons =

Czech sport shooter (born 1983)

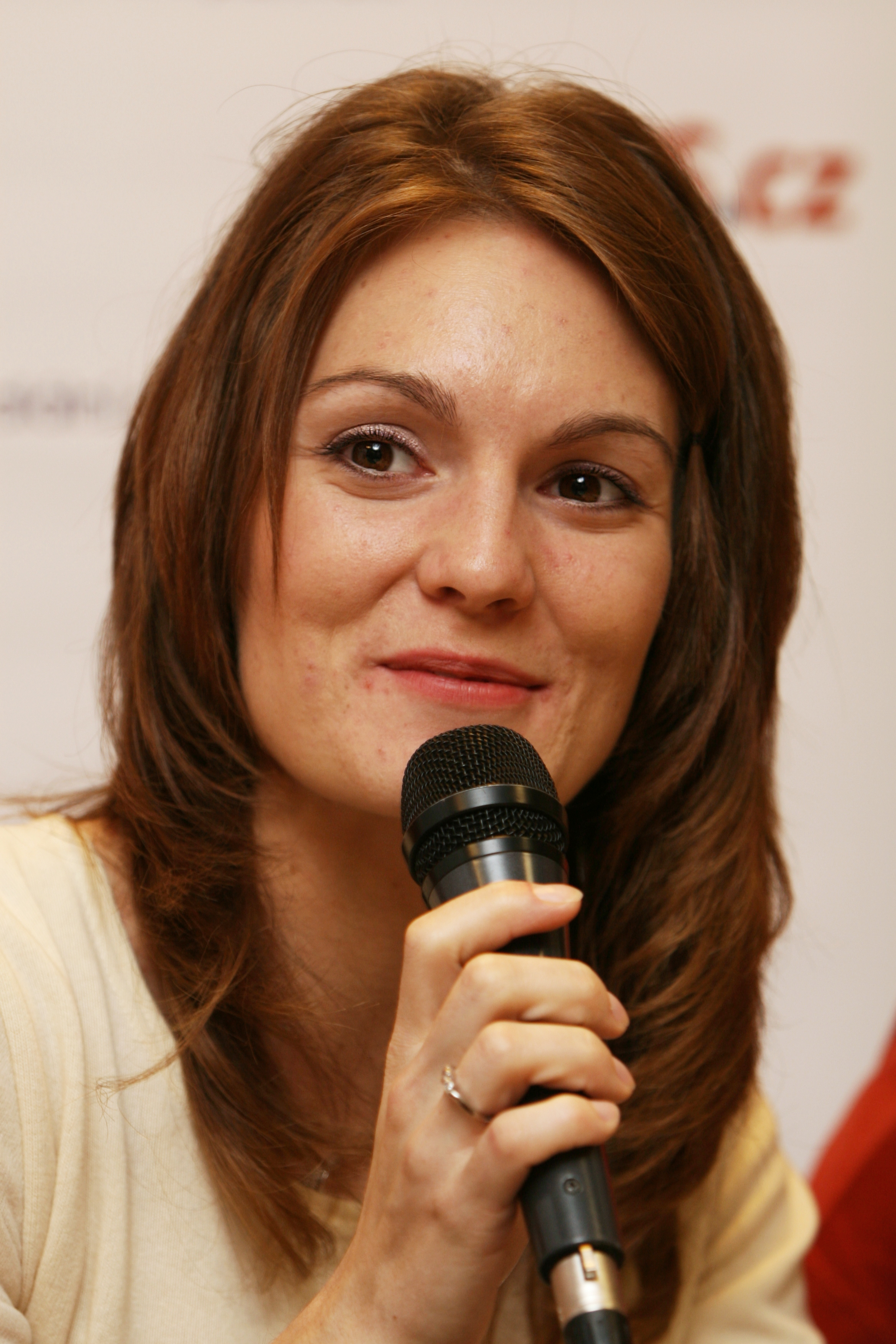
- Emmons in 2008

Personal information
- Nationality: Czech Republic
- Born: Kateřina Kůrková; 17 November 1983 (age 42) Plzeň, Czechoslovakia
- Height: 1.67 m (5 ft 6 in)
- Weight: 54 kg (119 lb)

Sport
- Sport: Shooting
- Events: AR40, STR3X20
Medal record
Event	1st	2nd	3rd
Olympic Games	1	1	1
World Championships	1	1	-
European Championships	2	1	1
Olympic Games
Gold medal – first place	2008 Beijing	AR40
Silver medal – second place	2008 Beijing	STR3X20
Bronze medal – third place	2004 Athens	AR40
World Championships
Gold medal – first place	2002	AR40
Silver medal – second place	2006	AR40
ISSF World Cup Final
Bronze medal – third place	2004	AR40
Bronze medal – third place	2007	AR40
European Championships
Gold medal – first place	2004	AR40
Gold medal – first place	2007	AR40
Silver medal – second place	2008	AR40
Bronze medal – third place	2006	AR40

Kateřina Emmons (née Kůrková (Czech pronunciation: [ˈkatɛr̝ɪna ˈkuːrkovaː]), born 17 November 1983) is a Czech former sport shooter. She participated in the Summer Olympic Games on three occasions. She won a bronze medal at the 2004 Summer Olympics. At the 2008 Summer Olympics, Emmons won her first gold medal in women's 10 metre air rifle competition, and a silver medal in the 50 metre rifle three positions event. In addition to her Olympic medals, Emmons won gold and silver medals at the World Shooting Championships.

== Career ==
Early in her career, Kůrková won gold at the 2002 ISSF World Shooting Championships in the 10 metre air rifle competition.

At the 2004 Summer Olympics, Kůrková won a bronze medal in the 10 metre air rifle competition and finished 27th in her second event, the 50-metre rifle three-position event. At the 2006 ISSF World Shooting Championships Kůrková was unable to defend her 2002 title but finished second for a silver medal.

Emmons won the first gold medal of the 2008 Summer Olympics in Beijing ahead of 2004 champion and favourite for the competition, Du Li. Emmons equalled the world record and set a new Olympic Record in the qualifying round by achieving a maximum score of 400. She then proceeded to set a new Olympic Record in the final by scoring a total of 503.5 points. A few days later Emmons won another Olympic medal, this time silver, in the 50 metre rifle three positions event behind champion Du Li.

Emmons participated at the 2012 Summer Olympics in London and reached the 10 metre air rifle final, but missed out on a medal after finishing fourth. In 2015 she announced the end of her shooting career.

In 2018, Emmons had been appointed as a consultant shooting coach with the Czech biathlon team.

On 28 October 2026, she was awarded by the Czech Republic's Medal of Merit for services to the state in the field of sport.

== Olympic results ==
Event	2004	2008	2012
50 metre rifle three positions	27th 565	(silver) Silver; 586+101.7	32nd 576
10 metre air rifle	(bronze) Bronze; 398+103.1	(gold) Gold; 400+103.5	4th 397+103.3

== Records ==
Current world records held in 10 metre air rifle
Women	Qualification	400	Seo Sun-hwa (KOR); Gao Jing (CHN); Lioubov Galkina (RUS); Du Li (CHN); Lioubov Galkina (RUS); Suma Shirur (IND); Lioubov Galkina (RUS); Monika Haselsberger (AUT); Barbara Lechner (GER); Zhao Yinghui (CHN); Wu Liuxi (CHN); Du Li (CHN); Sonja Pfeilschifter (GER); Kateřina Emmons (CZE); Lioubov Galkina (RUS); Yi Siling (CHN)	12 April 2002; 22 April 2002; 24 August 2002; 4 June 2003; 14 June 2003; 13 February 2004; 22 February 2004; 22 April 2004; 5 March 2005; 11 April 2005; 11 June 2005; 4 October 2006; 24 May 2008; 9 August 2008; 5 November 2008; 1 August 2010	Sydney (AUS); Shanghai (CHN); Munich (GER); Zagreb (CRO); Munich (GER); Kuala Lumpur (MAS); Bangkok (THA); Athens (GRE); Tallinn (EST); Changwon (KOR); Munich (GER); Granada (ESP); Milan (ITA); Beijing (CHN); Bangkok (THA); Munich (GER)

== Personal life ==
Emmons is married to American Olympic rifle shooter Matthew Emmons. They met at the 2004 Olympic Games in Athens and married near Plzeň on 30 June 2007. The couple have four children.
