= Shooting at the 2008 Summer Olympics =

Shooting at the Games of the XXIX Olympiad
- Venue: Beijing Shooting Range Hall (rifle & pistol); Beijing Shooting Range Clay; Target Field (shotgun)
- Dates: 9–17 August 2008
- Competitors: 390 from 103 nations

Shooting competitions at the 2008 Summer Olympics in Beijing were held from August 9 to August 17, at the Beijing Shooting Range Hall (rifle and pistol events) and Beijing Shooting Range Clay Target Field (shotgun events). Of the fifteen events, the host country won five.

Highlights included:

- Two rifle shooters, Czech Kateřina Kůrková and American Matthew Emmons, who met at the 2004 Olympics, married in 2007 and returned to the 2008 Games to win a gold and two silver medals between them.
  - Kateřina Emmons equalled the world record with a perfect 400 in the women's air rifle competition.
  - Matthew lost a large lead in the last shot of the men's three positions - just as he had in Athens four years earlier.
- Abhinav Bindra won India's first ever individual Olympic gold.
- Russian Natalia Paderina and Georgian Nino Salukvadze, whose countries were at war, won silver and bronze respectively in the 10m Air Pistol. They shared hugged and shook hands on the podium, which was seen as peaceful gesture.
- The eighth appearance at the Olympics for Latvian Afanasijs Kuzmins
- The seventh Olympic appearance for Slovenian Rajmond Debevec (who won bronze), making him only the fifth shooter to have ever competed in at least seven Olympic Games.
- The sixth Olympic appearance for eight shooters, raising to 22 the number of shooters who have competed in at least six Olympic Games:
  - Canadian Dr Susan Nattrass
  - Finn Juha Hirvi,
  - Italian Andrea Benelli
  - German Ralf Schumann, who won his fifth Olympic medal.
  - Bulgarian Tanyu Kiryakov
  - Monegasque Fabienne Diato-Pasetti,
  - Serbian Jasna Šekarić (competing under her fourth flag at the Olympics without ever having changed nationality),
  - Georgian Nino Salukvadze. She won bronze, completing the set twenty years after she won gold and silver at the 1988 Olympics.
- The fifth Olympic appearance for 16 shooters, raising to 80 the number of shooters who have competed in at least five Olympic Games: Mönkhbayar Dorjsurengiin, Svetlana Demina, María Pilar Fernández, Mariya Grozdeva, Michael Diamond, Franck Dumoulin, Thomas Farnik, Andrei Inešin, Harald Jensen, Kanstantsin Lukashyk, Russell Mark, Sergey Martynov, Giovanni Pellielo, Stevan Pletikošić, Iulian Raicea, Axel Wegner.

The sport also faced its first major doping case, when Kim Jong-su of North Korea was stripped of his medals in 50 metre pistol and 10 metre air pistol after testing positive for propranolol, a beta blocker that some performers use to reduce stage fright and some surgeons use to reduce hand tremors during operations.

== Events ==
15 sets of medals were awarded in the following events:

	Discipline	Men	Women
Rifle	50 metre rifle prone	✔	
Rifle	50 metre rifle three positions	✔	✔
Rifle	10 metre air rifle	✔	✔
Pistol	50 metre pistol	✔	
Pistol	25 metre pistol		✔
Pistol	25 metre rapid fire pistol	✔	
Pistol	10 metre air pistol	✔	✔
Shotgun	Skeet	✔	✔
Shotgun	Trap	✔	✔
Shotgun	Double Trap	✔	

A NOC may enter up to two athletes in all events except women's trap and skeet events where it can enter only one athlete. Only athletes who achieve the Minimum Qualification Score (MQS) can participate at the Olympics. One athlete can achieve only one quota place for his/her NOC in any event. If a quota place is won in a qualification event by a shooter who has already won a quota place in any event, the quota place will be granted to the NOC of the next ranking shooter.

== Qualification ==
Quota places are as follows:

Event	2006 Worlds	Shotgun WCH		World Cups			2007 Continental championships					Host Nation	TOTAL
Event	2006 Worlds	2005	2007	2005	2006	2007	Europe	America	Asia	Africa	Oceania	Host Nation	TOTAL
50m Rifle Prone Men	4	-	-	4	4	4	3	2	2	1	1	-	25
50m Rifle 3 Positions Men	4	-	-	4	4	4	3	2	2	1	1	1	26
10m Air Rifle Men	5	-	-	4	4	4	3	2	2	1	1	-	26
50m Pistol Men	4	-	-	4	4	4	3	2	2	1	1	-	25
25m Rapid Fire Pistol Men	2	-	-	-	4	4	2	1	1	1	1	1	17
10m Air Pistol Men	5	-	-	4	4	4	3	2	2	1	1	1	27
Trap Men	3	1	1	4	4	4	4	3	3	1	2	1	31
Double Trap Men	2	1	1	-	4	4	1	1	1	1	1	-	17
Skeet Men	3	1	1	4	4	4	5	3	3	1	2	1	32
50m Rifle 3 Positions Women	4	-	-	4	4	4	3	2	2	1	1	-	25
10m Air Rifle Women	5	-	-	4	4	4	3	2	2	1	1	1	27
25m Pistol Women	4	-	-	4	4	4	3	2	2	1	1	1	26
10m Air Pistol Women	5	-	-	4	4	4	3	2	2	1	1	-	26
Skeet Women	2	1	1	-	4	4	1	1	1	1	1	1	18
Trap Women	2	1	1	-	4	4	1	1	1	1	1	1	18

*Note - there will also be 10 invitation and 14 universality quota places

== Event schedule ==
All times are China Standard Time (UTC+8)

=== Saturday, August 9, 2008 ===
Time	Event	Round
8:30-9:45	Women's 10m Air Rifle	Qualification
9:00-13:30	Men's Trap	Qualification
10:30-10:50	Women's 10m Air Rifle	Final
12:00-13:45	Men's 10m Air Pistol	Qualification
15:00-15:20	Men's 10m Air Pistol	Final

=== Sunday, August 10, 2008 ===
Time	Event	Round
9:00-11:15	Women's 10m Air Pistol	Qualification
9:00-12:00	Men's Trap	Qualification
12:00-12:20	Women's 10m Air Pistol	Final
15:00-15:45	Men's Trap	Final

=== Monday, August 11, 2008 ===
Time	Event	Round
8:00-10:45	Men's 10m Air Rifle	Qualification
9:00-13:30	Women's Trap	Qualification
12:00-12:20	Men's 10m Air Rifle	Final
15:00-15:45	Women's Trap	Final

=== Tuesday, August 12, 2008 ===
Time	Event	Round
9:00-11:00	Men's 50m Pistol	Qualification
9:00-13:00	Men's Double Trap	Qualification
12:00-12:20	Men's 50m Pistol	Final
15:00-15:45	Men's Double Trap	Final

=== Wednesday, August 13, 2008 ===
Time	Event	Round
9:00-14:00	Women's 25m Pistol	Qualification
15:00-15:20	Women's 25m Pistol	Final

=== Thursday, August 14, 2008 ===
Time	Event	Round
9:00-11:15	Women's 50m Rifle 3 Positions	Qualification
9:00-13:00	Women's Skeet	Qualification
12:30-12:50	Women's 50m Rifle 3 Positions	Final
15:00-15:45	Women's Skeet	Final

=== Friday, August 15, 2008 ===
Time	Event	Round
9:00-10:15	Men's 50m Rifle Prone	Qualification
9:00-13:30	Men's Skeet	Qualification
11:30-11:50	Men's 50m Rifle Prone	Final
13:00-15:00	Men's 25m Rapid Fire Pistol	Qualification

=== Saturday, August 16, 2008 ===
Time	Event	Round
9:00-11:00	Men's 25m Rapid Fire Pistol	Qualification
9:00-12:00	Men's Skeet	Qualification
12:00-12:40	Men's 25m Rapid Fire Pistol	Final
15:00-15:45	Men's Skeet	Final

=== Sunday, August 17, 2008 ===
Time	Event	Round
9:00-12:20	Men's 50m Rifle 3 Positions	Qualification
13:30-13:50	Men's 50m Rifle 3 Positions	Final

== Medal summary ==
=== Medal table ===
* Host nation (China)

Rank	Nation	Gold	Silver	Bronze	Total
1	China*	5	2	1	8
2	United States	2	2	2	6
3	Czech Republic	2	1	0	3
3	Ukraine	2	1	0	3
5	Italy	1	2	0	3
6	South Korea	1	1	0	2
7	Finland	1	0	1	2
8	India	1	0	0	1
9	Russia	0	2	2	4
10	Germany	0	1	3	4
11	Mongolia	0	1	0	1
11	Norway	0	1	0	1
11	Slovakia	0	1	0	1
14	Australia	0	0	1	1
14	Croatia	0	0	1	1
14	Cuba	0	0	1	1
14	France	0	0	1	1
14	Georgia	0	0	1	1
14	Slovenia	0	0	1	1
Totals (19 entries)		15	15	15	45

=== Men's events ===
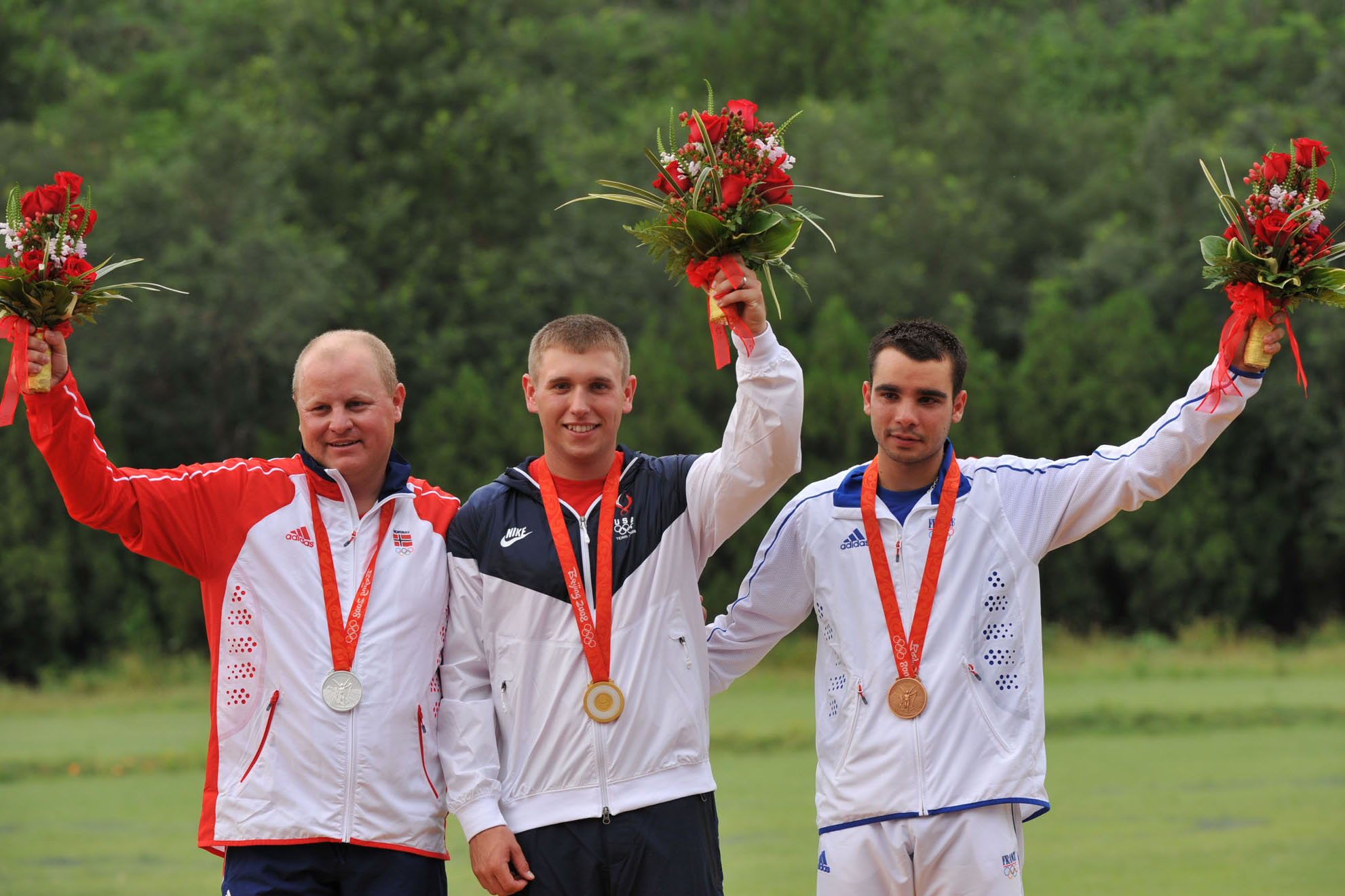
The medal winners in men's skeet. From left tor right: Tore Brovold, Vincent Hancock, Anthony Terras

Event	Gold	Silver	Bronze
10 m air rifle	Abhinav Bindra; India	Zhu Qinan; China	Henri Häkkinen; Finland
50 m rifle prone	Artur Ayvazyan; Ukraine	Matthew Emmons; United States	Warren Potent; Australia
50 m rifle three positions	Qiu Jian; China	Jury Sukhorukov; Ukraine	Rajmond Debevec; Slovenia
10 m air pistol	Pang Wei; China	Jin Jong-oh; South Korea	Jason Turner; United States
25 m rapid fire pistol	Oleksandr Petriv; Ukraine	Ralf Schumann; Germany	Christian Reitz; Germany
50 m pistol	Jin Jong-oh; South Korea	Tan Zongliang; China	Vladimir Isakov; Russia
Skeet	Vincent Hancock; United States	Tore Brovold; Norway	Anthony Terras; France
Trap	David Kostelecký; Czech Republic	Giovanni Pellielo; Italy	Aleksei Alipov; Russia
Double trap	Walton Eller; United States	Francesco D'Aniello; Italy	Hu Binyuan; China

Kim Jong-su of North Korea originally won the silver medal in the 50 metre pistol and bronze in the 10 metre air pistol, but was disqualified after he tested positive for propranolol.

=== Women's events ===
Event	Gold	Silver	Bronze
10 m air rifle	Kateřina Emmons; Czech Republic	Lioubov Galkina; Russia	Snježana Pejčić; Croatia
50 m rifle three positions	Du Li; China	Kateřina Emmons; Czech Republic	Eglis Yaima Cruz; Cuba
10 m air pistol	Guo Wenjun; China	Natalia Paderina; Russia	Nino Salukvadze; Georgia
25 m pistol	Chen Ying; China	Otryadyn Gündegmaa; Mongolia	Munkhbayar Dorjsuren; Germany
Skeet	Chiara Cainero; Italy	Kimberly Rhode; United States	Christine Brinker; Germany
Trap	Satu Mäkelä-Nummela; Finland	Zuzana Štefečeková; Slovakia	Corey Cogdell; United States

== New records ==
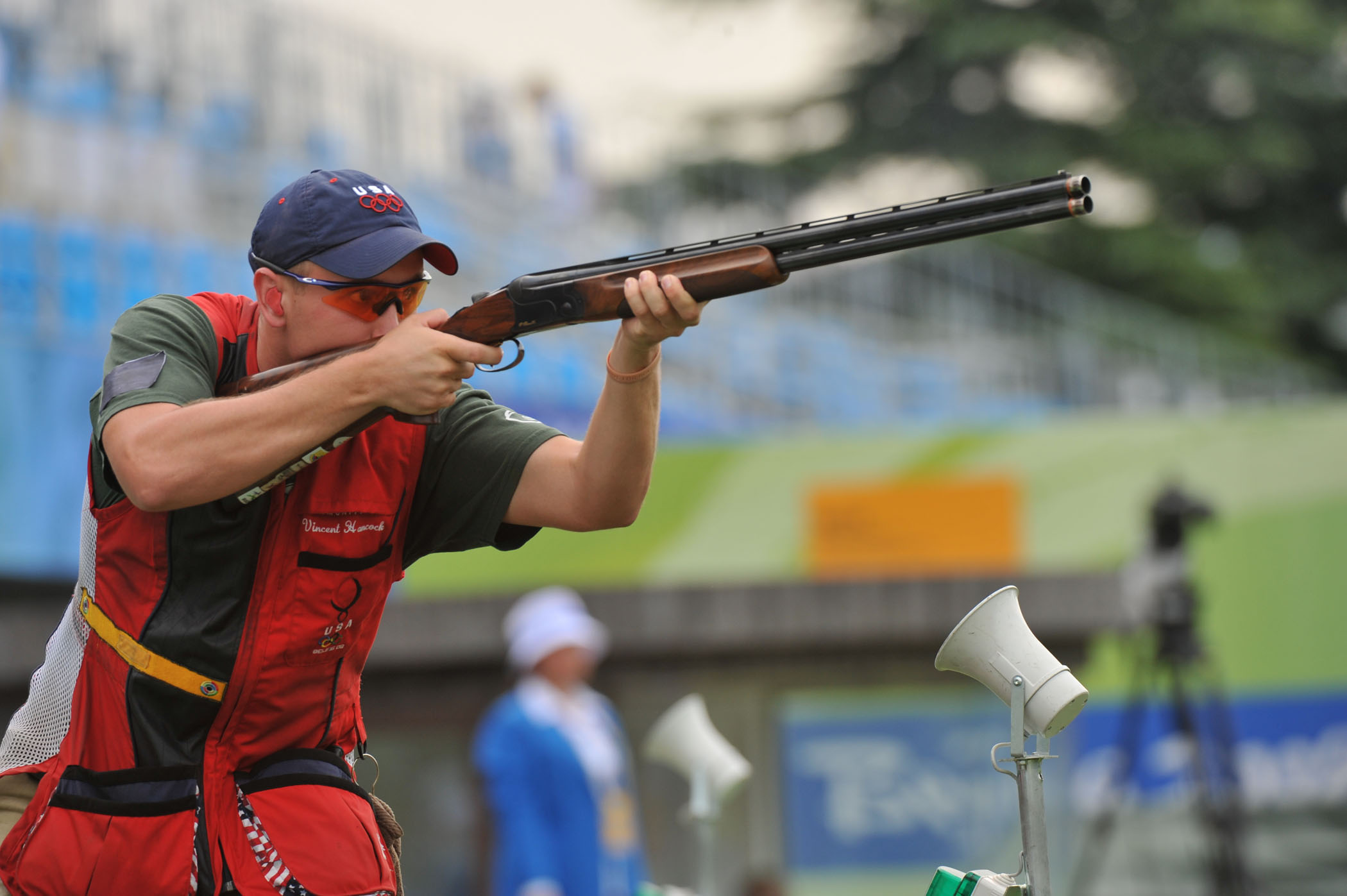
Vincent Hancock in the finals for men's skeet, in which he earned the gold medal and set records both in the qualifying and finals.

Date	Event	Round	Score	Athlete	Previous record
World records equalled
August 9, 2008	Women's 10 m air rifle	Qual.	400	Kateřina Emmons (CZE)	400 by Seo Sun-hwa (2002), equalled 12 times
Olympic records broken
August 9, 2008	Women's 10 m air rifle	Qual.	400	Kateřina Emmons (CZE)	399 by Lioubov Galkina (2004)
August 9, 2008	Women's 10 m air rifle	Final	503.5	Kateřina Emmons (CZE)	502.0 by Du Li (2004)
August 10, 2008	Women's 10 m air pistol	Qual.	391	Natalia Paderina (RUS)	390 by Marina Logvinenko (1996) and Tao Luna (2004)
August 10, 2008	Women's 10 m air pistol	Final	492.3	Guo Wenjun (CHN)	490.1 by Olga Klochneva (1996)
August 12, 2008	Men's double trap	Qual.	145	Walton Eller (USA)	144 by Ahmed Al Maktoum (2004)
August 12, 2008	Men's double trap	Final	190	Walton Eller (USA)	189 by Russell Mark (1996) and Ahmed Al Maktoum (2004)
August 14, 2008	Women's 50 m rifle 3 pos	Final	690.3	Du Li (CHN)	688.4 by Lioubov Galkina (2004)
Olympic records equalled
August 13, 2008	Women's 25 m pistol	Qual.	590	Otryadyn Gündegmaa (MGL)	590 by Tao Luna (2000)
August 14, 2008	Women's 50 m rifle 3 pos	Qual.	589	Du Li (CHN)	589 by Renata Mauer (1996)
Olympic records established after rule changes
August 10, 2008	Men's trap	Final	146	David Kostelecký (CZE)	
August 11, 2008	Women's trap	Final	91	Satu Mäkelä-Nummela (FIN)	
August 13, 2008	Women's 25 m pistol	Final	793.4	Chen Ying (CHN)	
August 14, 2008	Women's skeet	Qual.	72	Chiara Cainero (ITA)	
August 14, 2008	Women's skeet	Final	93	Chiara Cainero (ITA); Kim Rhode (USA); Christine Brinker (GER)	
August 16, 2008	Men's 25 m rapid fire pistol	Qual.	583	Keith Sanderson (USA)	
August 16, 2008	Men's 25 m rapid fire pistol	Final	780.2	Oleksandr Petriv (UKR)	
August 16, 2008	Men's skeet	Qual.	121	Vincent Hancock (USA)	
August 16, 2008	Men's skeet	Final	145	Vincent Hancock (USA); Tore Brovold (NOR)	

== See also ==
- Shooting at the 2008 Summer Paralympics
