= Kim Yeo-oul =

South Korean sport shooter

Personal information
- Nationality: South Korea
- Born: 24 June 1987 (age 39)
- Height: 1.65 m (5 ft 5 in)
- Weight: 60 kg (132 lb)

Sport
- Sport: Shooting
- Event: 10 m air rifle (AR40)

- Kim Yeo-oul
- Hangul: 김여울
- RR: Gim Yeoul
- MR: Kim Yŏul

Kim Yeo-oul (also Kim Yeo-ul, Korean: 김여울; born June 24, 1987) is a South Korean sport shooter. Kim represented South Korea at the 2008 Summer Olympics in Beijing, where she competed in the women's 10 m air rifle, along with her teammate Kim Chan-mi. She finished only in thirteenth place by one point ahead of Norway's Kristina Vestveit from the second attempt, for a total score of 395 targets.
