= Lyubov Galkina =

Russian sport shooter (born 1973)

Lioubov Galkina Любовь Галкина
Personal information
- Nationality: Russia
- Born: 15 March 1973 (age 53) Alapaevsk, Russian SFSR, Soviet Union
- Height: 1.65 m (5 ft 5 in)
- Weight: 57 kg (126 lb)

Sport
- Sport: Shooting
- Event(s): AR40, STR3X20, STR60PR
Medal record
Olympic Games
Gold medal – first place	2004	STR3X20
Silver medal – second place	2004	AR40
Silver medal – second place	2008	AR40
World Championships
Gold medal – first place	2006	STR3X20
ISSF World Cup Final
Gold medal – first place	2002	AR40
Gold medal – first place	2003	STR3X20
Gold medal – first place	2004	STR3X20
Gold medal – first place	2006	STR3X20
Silver medal – second place	2008	AR40
Bronze medal – third place	2008	STR3X20
Bronze medal – third place	2009	AR40
European Championships
Gold medal – first place	1999	STR3X20
Gold medal – first place	2003	AR40
Gold medal – first place	2008	AR40
Silver medal – second place	1999	AR40
Silver medal – second place	2005	AR40
Bronze medal – third place	1998	AR40
Bronze medal – third place	2001	AR40
Bronze medal – third place	2002	AR40
Bronze medal – third place	2003	STR3X20
Bronze medal – third place	2011	AR40

Lioubov Galkina (Russian: Любовь Галкина) (born 15 March 1973 in Alapayevsk, Russian SFSR) is a Russian sport shooter and Olympic champion. She received two medals at the 2004 Summer Olympics in Athens.

== Olympic results ==
Event	2000	2004	2008	2012
50 metre rifle three positions	—	(gold) Gold; 587+102.4	4th 585+102.4	28th 577
10 metre air rifle	4th 395+101.7	(silver) Silver; 399+102.5	(silver) Silver; 399+103.1	10th 396

== Records ==
Current world records held in 10 metre air rifle
Women	Qualification	400	Seo Sun-hwa (KOR); Gao Jing (CHN); Lioubov Galkina (RUS); Du Li (CHN); Lioubov Galkina (RUS); Suma Shirur (IND); Lioubov Galkina (RUS); Monika Haselsberger (AUT); Barbara Lechner (GER); Zhao Yinghui (CHN); Wu Liuxi (CHN); Du Li (CHN); Sonja Pfeilschifter (GER); Kateřina Emmons (CZE); Lioubov Galkina (RUS); Yi Siling (CHN)	12 April 2002; 22 April 2002; 24 August 2002; 4 June 2003; 14 June 2003; 13 February 2004; 22 February 2004; 22 April 2004; 5 March 2005; 11 April 2005; 11 June 2005; 4 October 2006; 24 May 2008; 9 August 2008; 5 November 2008; 1 August 2010	Sydney (AUS); Shanghai (CHN); Munich (GER); Zagreb (CRO); Munich (GER); Kuala Lumpur (MAS); Bangkok (THA); Athens (GRE); Tallinn (EST); Changwon (KOR); Munich (GER); Granada (ESP); Milan (ITA); Beijing (CHN); Bangkok (THA); Munich (GER)
