= Beijing Shooting Range Clay Target Field =

Shooting range in Beijing

Coordinates: 39°56′50″N 116°12′12″E

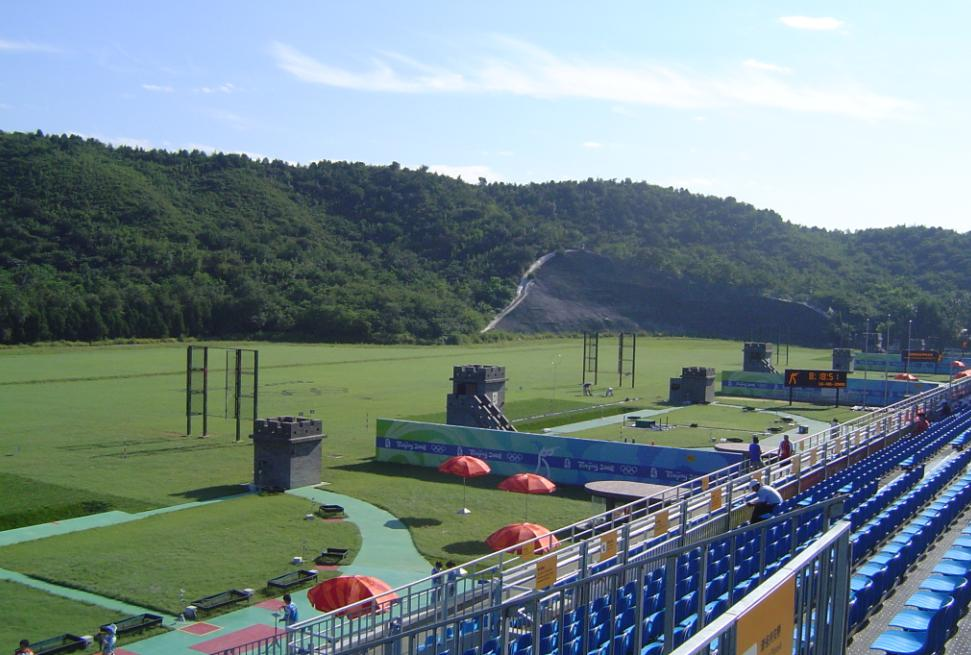
The Beijing Shooting Range Clay Target Field

The Beijing Shooting Range Clay Target Field (simplified Chinese: 北京射击场飞碟靶场; traditional Chinese: 北京射擊場飛碟靶場; pinyin: Běijīng Shèjīchǎng Fēidié Bǎchǎng) is a shooting range in the Shijingshan District of Beijing, China. During the 1990 Asian Games, the shooting range was used for shooting and archery competitions. It was under renovation and was completed in August 2007 for the 2008 Summer Olympics.

At the 2008 Olympics, the shooting range hosted men's and women's skeet shooting and trap shooting events.

It has floor space of 6,170 square metres with a capacity of 5,000 seats which was reduced to 1,047 after the Games.
