= Monika Haselsberger =

Austrian sport shooter

Monika Haselsberger (born 23 September 1976) is an Austrian sport shooter who competed in the 2000 Summer Olympics and in the 2004 Summer Olympics.

Current world records held in 10 metre air rifle
Women	Qualification	400	Seo Sun-hwa (KOR); Gao Jing (CHN); Lioubov Galkina (RUS); Du Li (CHN); Lioubov Galkina (RUS); Suma Shirur (IND); Lioubov Galkina (RUS); Monika Haselsberger (AUT); Barbara Lechner (GER); Zhao Yinghui (CHN); Wu Liuxi (CHN); Du Li (CHN); Sonja Pfeilschifter (GER); Kateřina Emmons (CZE); Lioubov Galkina (RUS); Yi Siling (CHN)	12 April 2002; 22 April 2002; 24 August 2002; 4 June 2003; 14 June 2003; 13 February 2004; 22 February 2004; 22 April 2004; 5 March 2005; 11 April 2005; 11 June 2005; 4 October 2006; 24 May 2008; 9 August 2008; 5 November 2008; 1 August 2010	Sydney (AUS); Shanghai (CHN); Munich (GER); Zagreb (CRO); Munich (GER); Kuala Lumpur (MAS); Bangkok (THA); Athens (GRE); Tallinn (EST); Changwon (KOR); Munich (GER); Granada (ESP); Milan (ITA); Beijing (CHN); Bangkok (THA); Munich (GER)
