= Yosheefin Prasasti =

Indonesian sport shooter (born 1982)

Personal information
- Full name: Yosheefin Shila Prasasti
- Nationality: Indonesia
- Born: 3 July 1982 (age 43) Sleman, Yogyakarta, Indonesia
- Height: 1.54 m (5 ft 1/2 in)
- Weight: 54 kg (119 lb)

Sport
- Sport: Shooting
- Event: 10 m air rifle
- Club: Bimantara SC
Medal record
Women's shooting
Representing Indonesia
SEA Games
Bronze medal – third place	2007 Nakhon Ratchasima	50 m rifle prone team

Yosheefin Shila Prasasti (born July 3, 1982 in Sleman) is an Indonesian sport shooter. At age twenty-two, Prasasti made her official debut at the 2004 Summer Olympics in Athens, where she placed twenty-second in the women's 10 m air rifle, with a score of 392 points, tying her position with four other athletes, including Finland's Marjo Yli-Kiikka.

At the 2008 Summer Olympics in Beijing, Prasasti competed for the second time in the women's 10 m air rifle after receiving a wild card slot. She placed twenty-fourth out of forty-seven shooters in the qualifying rounds of her event, with a slightly improved score of 393 points.
