= Alexia Smirli =

Greek sport shooter

Personal information
- Full name: Alexia Smirli
- Nationality: Greece
- Born: 25 October 1983 (age 42) Athens, Greece
- Height: 1.67 m (5 ft 5 1/2 in)
- Weight: 67 kg (148 lb)

Sport
- Sport: Shooting
- Event: 10 m air rifle (AR40)
- Club: AOPA
- Coached by: Anna Pelova (national)

Alexia Smirli (also Alexia Smyrli, Greek: Αλεξία Σμυρλή; born 25 October 1983) is a Greek sport shooter. She was selected as one of eleven shooters to represent the host nation Greece at the 2004 Summer Olympics in Athens, and had attained a top nine finish in a major international competition, spanning the ISSF World Cup series and the European Championships. Smirli trains under Russian-born head coach Anna Pelova for the national team, while shooting at Maroussi Paradise Athletics Club (Greek: Αθλητικός Όμιλος Παραδείσου Αμαρουσίου) on the outskirts of Athens.

Smirli was named as part of the host nation's shooting team to compete in the women's 10 m air rifle at the 2004 Summer Olympics in Athens. She had registered a minimum qualifying score of 394 from her outside-final finish at the ISSF World Cup meet in Fort Benning, Georgia, United States to fill in one of the Olympic berths reserved to the host nation, after the Hellenic Shooting Federation decided to exchange spots in her pet event with the unused quotas from the women's skeet. Smirli shot a decent 391 out of a possible 400 to tie for twenty-seventh place with four other markswomen in the qualifying round, failing to advance further to the final.
