= Tino Wenzel =

German sport shooter (born 1973)

Personal information
- Nationality: Germany
- Born: 18 December 1973 (age 52) Ibbenbüren, North Rhine- Westphalia, West Germany
- Height: 1.79 m (5 ft 10 1/2 in)
- Weight: 102 kg (225 lb)

Sport
- Sport: Shooting
- Event: Skeet
- Club: SSC Schale
- Coached by: Willi Metelmann

Tino Wenzel (born 18 December 1973 in Ibbenbüren, North Rhine-Westphalia) is a German sport shooter. He won a gold medal for the men's skeet shooting at the 2006 ISSF World Cup in Suhl, and bronze at the 2003 ISSF World Cup in New Delhi, India, accumulating scores of 145 and 147 targets, respectively. Wenzel is also the husband of Olympic bronze medalist Christine Brinker.

At age thirty-four, Wenzel made his official debut for the 2008 Summer Olympics in Beijing, where he competed in the men's skeet shooting, along with his teammate Axel Wegner. He finished only in thirteenth place by one point ahead of Italian shooter and former Olympic champion Ennio Falco from the final attempt, for a total score of 117 targets.

World records held in Skeet from 2005 to 2012
Men	Teams	368	Germany (Wenzel, Wegner, Buchheim); Norway (Brovold, Undseth, Jensen)	August 12, 2011	Belgrade (SER)
