= Zhao Yinghui =

Chinese sport shooter

Personal information
- Nationality: China
- Born: October 20, 1981 (age 44) Shijiazhuang, Hebei
- Height: 1.58 m (5 ft 2 in)
- Weight: 49 kg (108 lb)

Sport
- Sport: Shooting
- Event(s): AR40, STR3X20
Medal record
Women's shooting
Representing China
Asian Games
Gold medal – first place	2002 Busan	10 m air rifle
Gold medal – first place	2002 Busan	10 m air rifle team
Gold medal – first place	2006 Doha	10 m air rifle team
Silver medal – second place	2006 Doha	10 m air rifle
Bronze medal – third place	1998 Bangkok	10 m air rifle
Bronze medal – third place	1998 Bangkok	10 m air rifle team
Asian Championships
Gold medal – first place	2007 Kuwait City	10 m air rifle team
Bronze medal – third place	2007 Kuwait City	10 m air rifle

Zhao Yinghui (simplified Chinese: 赵颖慧; traditional Chinese: 趙穎慧; pinyin: Zhào Yǐnghuì; born October 20, 1981, in Shijiazhuang, Hebei) is a Chinese sport shooter who competed in ISSF 10 meter air rifle at the 2000 Summer Olympics, the 2004 Summer Olympics, and the 2008 Summer Olympics. She reached the 2004 final and finished fourth.

== Olympic results ==
Event	2000	2004	2008
10 metre air rifle	9th 393	4th 398+102.8	37th 389

== Records ==
Current world records held in 10 m Air Rifle
Women	Qualification	400	Seo Sun-hwa (KOR); Gao Jing (CHN); Lioubov Galkina (RUS); Du Li (CHN); Lioubov Galkina (RUS); Suma Shirur (IND); Lioubov Galkina (RUS); Monika Haselsberger (AUT); Barbara Lechner (GER); Zhao Yinghui (CHN); Wu Liuxi (CHN); Du Li (CHN); Sonja Pfeilschifter (GER); Kateřina Emmons (CZE); Lioubov Galkina (RUS); Yi Siling (CHN)	12 April 2002; 22 April 2002; 24 August 2002; 4 June 2003; 14 June 2003; 13 February 2004; 22 February 2004; 22 April 2004; 5 March 2005; 11 April 2005; 11 June 2005; 4 October 2006; 24 May 2008; 9 August 2008; 5 November 2008; 1 August 2010	Sydney (AUS); Shanghai (CHN); Munich (GER); Zagreb (CRO); Munich (GER); Kuala Lumpur (MAS); Bangkok (THA); Athens (GRE); Tallinn (EST); Changwon (KOR); Munich (GER); Granada (ESP); Milan (ITA); Beijing (CHN); Bangkok (THA); Munich (GER)
Women	Teams	1196	China (Du, Wu, Zhao)	December 6, 2007	Kuwait City (KUW)
