= Melissa Mikec =

Salvadoran sports shooter (born 1987)

Personal information
- Born: Melissa Ivette Pérez Carballo; 3 August 1987 (age 38) San Salvador, El Salvador

Sport
- Country: El Salvador
- Sport: Sports shooting

Melissa Ivette Pérez Carballo (born 3 August 1987), better known under her married name Melissa Mikec, is a Salvadoran sports shooter. She competed in the women's 10 meter air rifle and women's 50 meter three positions events at the 2012 Summer Olympics. She is married to fellow Olympics sports shooter Damir Mikec, from Serbia.

Mikec has won two silver medals at the Central American and Caribbean games in Veracruz 2014 and Barranquilla 2018.
