= Shooting at the 2004 Summer Olympics =

Shooting at the Games of the XXVIII Olympiad
- Venue: Markopoulo Olympic Shooting Centre
- Dates: 14–22 August 2004
- Competitors: 390 from 103 nations

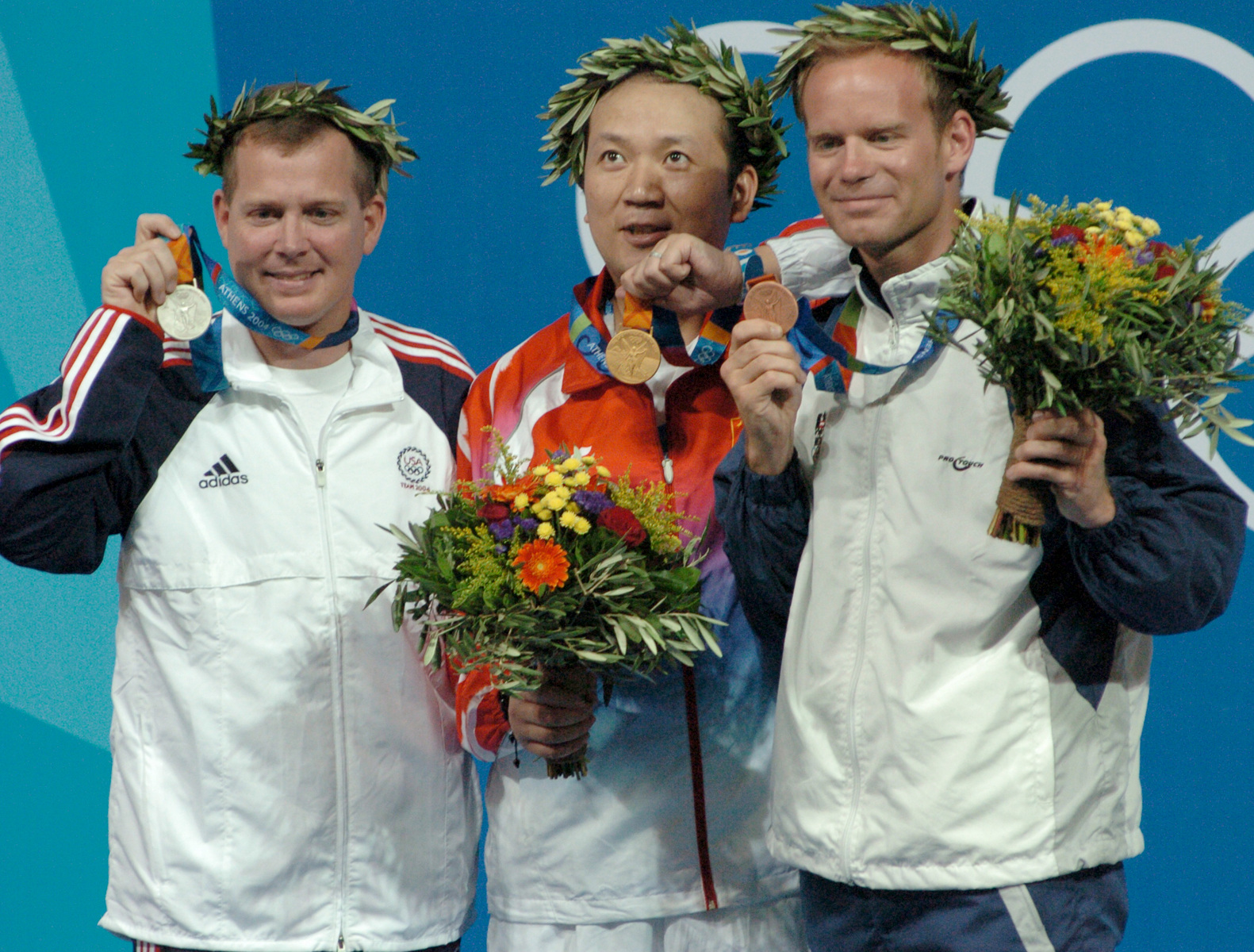
Jia Zhanbo (center) poses with Michael Anti (left) and Christian Planer (right) at the men's three position rifle award ceremony on 22 August 2004.

In shooting at the 2004 Summer Olympics, 390 competitors from 106 nations contested 17 events (10 for men and 7 for women). The competition took place at the Markopoulo Olympic Shooting Centre, located in the east of the Greek region of Attica.

== Competition schedule ==
Legend
Q	Qualification	F	Final

Schedule
Event ↓ / Date →	Sat 14		Sun 15		Mon 16		Tue 17		Wed 18		Thu 19		Fri 20		Sat 21		Sun 22	
Rifle
Men's 10 m air rifle					Q	F												
Men's 50 m rifle prone													Q	F				
Men's 50 m rifle 3 positions																	Q	F
Women's 10 m air rifle	Q	F																
Women's 50 m rifle 3 positions													Q	F				
Pistol
Men's 10 m air pistol	Q	F																
Men's 25 m rapid fire pistol															Q	F		
Men's 50 m pistol							Q	F										
Women's 10 m air pistol			Q	F														
Women's 25 m pistol									Q	F								
Shotgun
Men's trap	Q			F														
Men's double trap							Q	F										
Men's skeet															Q			F
Women's trap					Q	F												
Women's double trap									Q	F								
Women's skeet											Q	F						
Running target
Men's 10 m running target									Q			F						

== Medal summary ==
=== Men's events ===
Event	Gold	Silver	Bronze
10 metre air pistol	Wang Yifu; China	Mikhail Nestruyev; Russia	Vladimir Isakov; Russia
25 metre rapid fire pistol	Ralf Schumann; Germany	Sergei Poliakov; Russia	Sergei Alifirenko; Russia
50 metre pistol	Mikhail Nestruyev; Russia	Jin Jong-oh; South Korea	Kim Jong-su; North Korea
10 metre air rifle	Zhu Qinan; China	Li Jie; China	Jozef Gönci; Slovakia
50 metre rifle prone	Matthew Emmons; United States	Christian Lusch; Germany	Sergei Martynov; Belarus
50 metre rifle three positions	Jia Zhanbo; China	Michael Anti; United States	Christian Planer; Austria
Trap	Alexey Alipov; Russia	Giovanni Pellielo; Italy	Adam Vella; Australia
Double trap	Ahmed Al Maktoum; United Arab Emirates	Rajyavardhan Singh Rathore; India	Wang Zheng; China
Skeet	Andrea Benelli; Italy	Marko Kemppainen; Finland	Juan Miguel Rodríguez; Cuba
10 metre running target	Manfred Kurzer; Germany	Aleksandr Blinov; Russia	Dimitri Lykin; Russia

=== Women's events ===
Games	Gold	Silver	Bronze
10 metre air pistol	Olena Kostevych; Ukraine	Jasna Šekarić; Serbia and Montenegro	Mariya Grozdeva; Bulgaria
25 metre pistol	Mariya Grozdeva; Bulgaria	Lenka Hyková; Czech Republic	Irada Ashumova; Azerbaijan
10 metre air rifle	Du Li; China	Lioubov Galkina; Russia	Kateřina Kůrková; Czech Republic
50 metre rifle three positions	Lioubov Galkina; Russia	Valentina Turisini; Italy	Wang Chengyi; China
Trap	Suzanne Balogh; Australia	María Quintanal; Spain	Lee Bo-na; South Korea
Double trap	Kim Rhode; United States	Lee Bo-na; South Korea	Gao E China
Skeet	Diána Igaly; Hungary	Wei Ning; China	Zemfira Meftahatdinova; Azerbaijan

== Medal table ==
Rank	Nation	Gold	Silver	Bronze	Total
1	China	4	2	3	9
2	Russia	3	4	3	10
3	Germany	2	1	0	3
3	United States	2	1	0	3
5	Italy	1	2	0	3
6	Australia	1	0	1	2
6	Bulgaria	1	0	1	2
8	Hungary	1	0	0	1
8	Ukraine	1	0	0	1
8	United Arab Emirates	1	0	0	1
11	South Korea	0	2	1	3
12	Czech Republic	0	1	1	2
13	Finland	0	1	0	1
13	India	0	1	0	1
13	Serbia and Montenegro	0	1	0	1
13	Spain	0	1	0	1
17	Azerbaijan	0	0	2	2
18	Austria	0	0	1	1
18	Belarus	0	0	1	1
18	Cuba	0	0	1	1
18	North Korea	0	0	1	1
18	Slovakia	0	0	1	1
Totals (22 entries)		17	17	17	51

== Participating nations ==
A total of 390 shooters, 253 men and 137 women, from 106 nations competed at the Athens Games:

- Andorra (1)
- Argentina (3)
- Armenia (1)
- Australia (21)
- Austria (5)
- Azerbaijan (2)
- Bahrain (1)
- Bangladesh (1)
- Barbados (1)
- Belarus (9)
- Belgium (1)
- Bolivia (1)
- Bosnia and Herzegovina (1)
- Brazil (1)
- Bulgaria (3)
- Canada (2)
- Chile (1)
- China (26)
- Chinese Taipei (2)
- Colombia (3)
- Costa Rica (1)
- Croatia (1)
- Cuba (8)
- Cyprus (2)
- Czech Republic (8)
- Denmark (5)
- Dominican Republic (1)
- Ecuador (1)
- Egypt (5)
- El Salvador (1)
- Estonia (1)
- Fiji (1)
- Finland (6)
- France (8)
- Georgia (1)
- Germany (20)
- Great Britain (6)
- Greece (11)
- Guatemala (1)
- Hong Kong (1)
- Hungary (8)
- India (8)
- Indonesia (1)
- Iran (1)
- Ireland (1)
- Israel (2)
- Italy (13)
- Jamaica (1)
- Japan (9)
- Kazakhstan (4)
- North Korea (3)
- South Korea (16)
- Kuwait (5)
- Kyrgyzstan (1)
- Latvia (1)
- Lebanon (1)
- Liechtenstein (1)
- Lithuania (1)
- Macedonia (1)
- Malaysia (2)
- Malta (1)
- Mexico (1)
- Moldova (1)
- Monaco (1)
- Mongolia (1)
- Namibia (1)
- Nepal (1)
- Netherlands (3)
- New Zealand (2)
- Nicaragua (1)
- Norway (5)
- Oman (1)
- Pakistan (1)
- Peru (1)
- Philippines (1)
- Poland (5)
- Portugal (2)
- Puerto Rico (1)
- Qatar (2)
- Romania (2)
- Russia (24)
- San Marino (2)
- Saudi Arabia (1)
- Serbia and Montenegro (3)
- Singapore (1)
- Slovakia (3)
- Slovenia (1)
- South Africa (1)
- Spain (4)
- Sri Lanka (1)
- Sweden (8)
- Switzerland (5)
- Syria (1)
- Tajikistan (1)
- Thailand (2)
- Trinidad and Tobago (1)
- Turkey (1)
- Turkmenistan (1)
- Ukraine (11)
- United Arab Emirates (2)
- United States (21)
- Uzbekistan (2)
- Venezuela (1)
- Vietnam (1)
- Virgin Islands (1)
- Zimbabwe (1)

== See also ==
- Shooting at the 2003 Pan American Games
