= Fei Fengji =

Chinese sport shooter

Medal record

Women's shooting

Representing China

Asian Championships
Gold medal – first place	2007 Kuwait City	25 m pistol team
Bronze medal – third place	2007 Kuwait City	25 m pistol

Fei Fengji (born August 5, 1982 in Shanghai) is a female Chinese sports shooter, who competed for Team China at the 2008 Summer Olympics. She came in fourth place.

== Records ==
- 2006 World Championships - 2nd 25m sporting pistol;
- 2006 World Cup Germany/Italy - 1st 10m air pistol/25m sporting pistol
