= Kim Chan-mi (sport shooter) =

South Korean sport shooter

Personal information
- Nationality: South Korea
- Born: 15 December 1989 (age 36)
- Height: 1.58 m (5 ft 2 in)
- Weight: 40 kg (88 lb)

Sport
- Sport: Shooting
- Event: 10 m air rifle (AR40)
Medal record
Women's shooting
Representing South Korea
Asian Championships
Silver medal – second place	2007 Kuwait City	10 m air rifle
Silver medal – second place	2007 Kuwait City	10 m air rifle team

- Kim Chan-mi
- Hangul: 김찬미
- RR: Gim Chanmi
- MR: Kim Ch'anmi

Kim Chan-mi (Korean: 김찬미; born December 15, 1989) is a South Korean sport shooter. She won a silver medal in the women's air rifle at the 2007 Asian Shooting Championships, with a score of 501.1 points, earning a spot on the South Korean team for the Olympics.

Kim represented South Korea at the 2008 Summer Olympics in Beijing, where she competed in the women's 10 m air rifle, along with her teammate Kim Yeo-oul. She finished only in tenth place by one point behind Slovakia's Daniela Pešková from the final attempt, for a total score of 396 targets.
