= Phool Maya Kyapchhaki =

Nepalese sport shooter (born 1980)

Personal information
- Nationality: Nepali
- Born: 24 November 1980 (age 45) Janakpur, Dhanusa District, Nepal
- Height: 1.56 m (5 ft 1 1/2 in)
- Weight: 58 kg (128 lb)

Sport
- Sport: Shooting
- Event: 10 m air rifle
- Club: Mahendra Police Club

Phool Maya Kyapchhaki (Nepali: फूलमाया क्याप्छाकी) (born November 24, 1980, in Janakpur, Dhanusa District) is a Nepalese sport shooter. Kyapchhaki represented Nepal at the 2008 Summer Olympics in Beijing, where she competed for the women's 10 m air rifle. She placed forty-sixth out of forty-seven shooters in the qualifying rounds, with a score of 380 points.
