= Maryam Arzouqi =

Kuwaiti sports shooter

Personal information
- Born: 6 March 1987 (age 39) Kuwait City, Kuwait

Sport
- Sport: Sports shooting
Medal record
Women's shooting
Representing Kuwait
Asian Championships
| Silver medal – second place | 2012 Doha | 10 m air rifle |

Maryam Arzouqi (born 6 March 1987) is a Kuwaiti sports shooter. She competed in the Women's 10 metre air rifle and women's 50 metre three position events at the 2012 Summer Olympics.
