= Du Li =

Chinese sport shooter (born 1982)

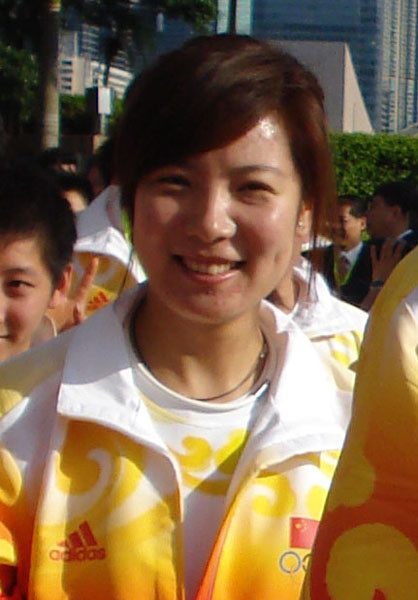

Personal information
- Native name: 杜丽
- Nationality: China
- Born: March 5, 1982 (age 44) Shandong, China
- Years active: 2002-2016
- Height: 1.70 m (5 ft 7 in)
- Weight: 55 kg (121 lb)

Sport
- Sport: Sport shooting
- Event(s): AR40, STR3X20
Medal record
Event	1st	2nd	3rd
Olympic Games	2	1	1
World Championships	1	1	-
Asian Games	2	-	-
Olympic Games
Gold medal – first place	2004 Athens	AR40
Gold medal – first place	2008 Beijing	STR3X20
Silver medal – second place	2016 Rio de Janeiro	AR40
Bronze medal – third place	2016 Rio de Janeiro	STR3X20
World Championships
Gold medal – first place	2006 Zagreb	AR40
Silver medal – second place	2002 Lahti	AR40
ISSF World Cup Final
Gold medal – first place	2004	AR40
Gold medal – first place	2005	AR40
Gold medal – first place	2006	AR40
Gold medal – first place	2007	AR40
Silver medal – second place	2003	AR40
Silver medal – second place	2009	STR3X20
Bronze medal – third place	2008	AR40
Asian Games
Gold medal – first place	2002 Busan	STR3X20
Gold medal – first place	2006 Doha	AR40

Du Li (simplified Chinese: 杜丽; traditional Chinese: 杜麗; pinyin: Dù Lì; born 5 March 1982 in Yiyuan, Zibo, Shandong) is a female Chinese sport shooter who was a gold medalist at the 2004 Olympics and the 2008 Olympics; she has also won titles at World Cup, World Championships and the Asian Games.

== Career ==
Du Li competed in the 2004 Summer Olympics, where she won the gold medal in the women's 10 metre air rifle competition. She has achieved the maximum 400 in this event twice (2003 and 2006). She was unable to defend that title in the 2008 Summer Olympics, losing to Kateřina Emmons on August 9, 2008, and finishing 5th in the 2008 Summer Olympics. However, she fought back to win a gold medal in the women's 50 metre rifle three positions competition, setting a new Olympic record in the process.

In the 2016 Summer Olympics, Du Li set a new Olympic record in women's 10 metre rifle in qualification rounds by scoring 420.7. She later won a silver medal on 6 August 2016 after being second to Virginia Thrasher in the final.

== Personal life ==
On November 29, 2009, Du married fellow Chinese Olympic shooting champion Pang Wei in Baoding, Hebei.

Current world records held in 50 metre rifle three positions
Women (ISSF)	Teams	1754	China (Shan, Wang, Xu); China (Du, Shan, Wang)	24 July 1998; 6 October 2002	Barcelona (ESP); Busan (KOR)
Current world records held in 10 metre air rifle
Women	Qualification	400	Seo Sun-hwa (KOR); Gao Jing (CHN); Lioubov Galkina (RUS); Du Li (CHN); Lioubov Galkina (RUS); Suma Shirur (IND); Lioubov Galkina (RUS); Monika Haselsberger (AUT); Barbara Lechner (GER); Zhao Yinghui (CHN); Wu Liuxi (CHN); Du Li (CHN); Sonja Pfeilschifter (GER); Kateřina Emmons (CZE); Lioubov Galkina (RUS); Yi Siling (CHN)	12 April 2002; 22 April 2002; 24 August 2002; 4 June 2003; 14 June 2003; 13 February 2004; 22 February 2004; 22 April 2004; 5 March 2005; 11 April 2005; 11 June 2005; 4 October 2006; 24 May 2008; 9 August 2008; 5 November 2008; 1 August 2010	Sydney (AUS); Shanghai (CHN); Munich (GER); Zagreb (CRO); Munich (GER); Kuala Lumpur (MAS); Bangkok (THA); Athens (GRE); Tallinn (EST); Changwon (KOR); Munich (GER); Granada (ESP); Milan (ITA); Beijing (CHN); Bangkok (THA); Munich (GER)
Women	Teams	1196	China (Du, Wu, Zhao)	December 6, 2007	Kuwait City (KUW)
