= Seo Sun-hwa =

South Korean sport shooter

Seo Sun-Hwa (Korean: 서선화; born March 5, 1982) is a female South Korean sports shooter who competed in 10 metre air rifle at the 2004 Summer Olympics, where she finished 27th. She set the first women's 10 metre air rifle world record with 400 points at the 2002 ISSF World Cup 1st Grand Prix in Sydney, Australia. She was born in Namwon, South Korea.

== Records ==
Current world records held in 10 metre air rifle
Women	Qualification	400	Seo Sun-hwa (KOR); Gao Jing (CHN); Lioubov Galkina (RUS); Du Li (CHN); Lioubov Galkina (RUS); Suma Shirur (IND); Lioubov Galkina (RUS); Monika Haselsberger (AUT); Barbara Lechner (GER); Zhao Yinghui (CHN); Wu Liuxi (CHN); Du Li (CHN); Sonja Pfeilschifter (GER); Kateřina Emmons (CZE); Lioubov Galkina (RUS); Yi Siling (CHN)	12 April 2002; 22 April 2002; 24 August 2002; 4 June 2003; 14 June 2003; 13 February 2004; 22 February 2004; 22 April 2004; 5 March 2005; 11 April 2005; 11 June 2005; 4 October 2006; 24 May 2008; 9 August 2008; 5 November 2008; 1 August 2010	Sydney (AUS); Shanghai (CHN); Munich (GER); Zagreb (CRO); Munich (GER); Kuala Lumpur (MAS); Bangkok (THA); Athens (GRE); Tallinn (EST); Changwon (KOR); Munich (GER); Granada (ESP); Milan (ITA); Beijing (CHN); Bangkok (THA); Munich (GER)
Junior women	Individual	400	Seo Sun-hwa (KOR); Zhang Yi (CHN)	April 12, 2002; December 6, 2007	Sydney (AUS); Kuwait City (KUW)
Junior women	Teams	1188	South Korea (Choi, Kim, Seo)	July 8, 2002	Lahti (FIN)
