= Laurence Brize =

French sports shooter

Personal information
- Born: 12 July 1976 (age 50) Le Puy-en-Velay, France
- Height: 1.58 m (5 ft 2 in)
- Weight: 55 kg (121 lb)

Sport
- Sport: Sports shooting

Laurence Brize (born 12 July 1976) is a French sports shooter. She competed at the 2004, 2008 and 2012 Summer Olympics.

At the 2004 Summer Olympics, she finished in 7th place in the 10m air rifle event and in joint 9th in the 50m rifle 3 positions event. In 2008, competing in the same events at the Olympics she finished in 19th in the 10m air rifle and 13th in the 50m rifle 3 positions. At the 2012 Summer Olympics, she finished in 26th place in the 10m air rifle and 18th in the 50m rifle 3 positions.
