= Marjo Yli-Kiikka =

Finnish sports shooter

Personal information
- Born: 16 June 1978 (age 48) Isokyrö, Finland

Sport
- Sport: Sports shooting

Marjo Yli-Kiikka (born 16 June 1978) is a Finnish sports shooter. She competed at the 2004, 2008 and 2012 Summer Olympics.
