= Gao Jing =

Chinese sport shooter

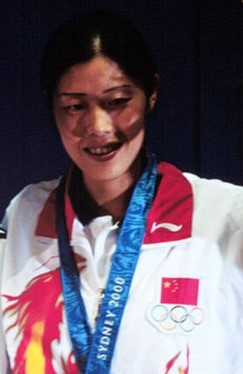

Personal information
- Native name: 高靜
- Born: 18 September 1975 (age 50) Tianjin, China
- Height: 1.70 m (5 ft 7 in)
- Weight: 56 kg (123 lb)

Sport
- Country: China
Medal record
Women's shooting
Representing China
Olympic Games
Bronze medal – third place	2000 Sydney	10 m air rifle

Gao Jing (高靜; born September 18, 1975) is a Chinese female sport shooter. She won the Bronze Medal in 10 m air rifle in the 2000 Summer Olympics in Sydney.
