= Suma Shirur =

Indian sport shooter

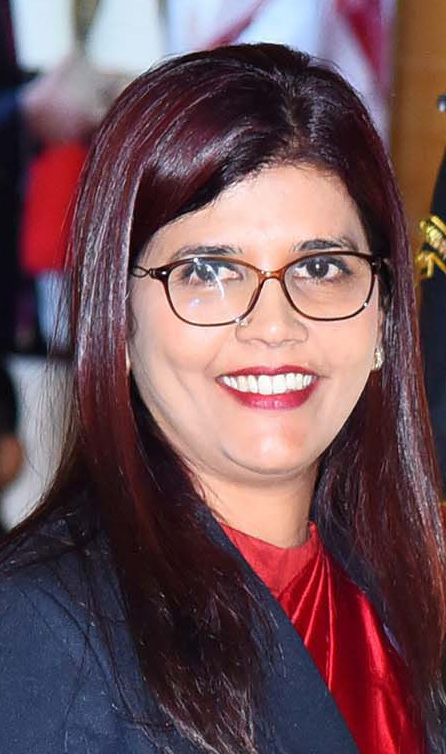

Personal information
- Born: Suma Betaraya Dixit; 10 May 1974 (age 52) Chikkaballapur, Karnataka, India
- Height: 160 cm (5 ft 3 in)
- Spouse: Siddharth Shirur

Sport
- Country: India
- Sport: Shooting
- Event: 10 metre air rifle
- Club: Indian Railways
Medal record
Women's shooting
Representing India
Asian Games
Silver medal – second place	2002 Busan	10 m air rifle team
Bronze medal – third place	2006 Doha	10 m air rifle team
Asian Championships
Gold medal – first place	2004 Kuala Lumpur	10 m air rifle
Bronze medal – third place	2005 Bangkok	10 m air rifle
Bronze medal – third place	2007 Kuwait City	10 m air rifle team
Gold medal – first place	2008 Nanjing	10 m air rifle team
Commonwealth Games
Gold medal – first place	2002 Manchester	10 m air rifle pairs
Silver medal – second place	2002 Manchester	10 m air rifle
Bronze medal – third place	2010 Delhi	10 m air rifle pairs

Suma Shirur (born 10 May 1974) is an Indian former sport shooter who competed in the 10 metre air rifle event. She equalled the then world record in the event, scoring the maximum of 400 points in the qualification round at the 2004 Asian Shooting Championships in Kuala Lumpur. In 2002, she was awarded the Arjuna Award by the government of India. She was the High Performance Coach of the Indian Junior Rifle Shooting Team. She is also the coach of 2020 Paralympics and 2024 Paralympics women's SH1 10m rifle gold medallist Avani Lekhara. On 30 November 2022, she was conferred the Dronacharya Award by the 15th President of India, Droupadi Murmu.

== Early life ==
Suma Betaraya Dixit was born on 10 May 1974, in Chikkaballapur, Karnataka, India. She completed her education in Navi Mumbai, doing schooling at St. Xavier's High School, Nerul, Junior College at Fr. Agnel's, Vashi and college education at the South Indian Education Society, graduating in chemistry. During her graduation course, she was a part of the National Cadet Corps. This was when she discovered her interest in shooting and then on took to the sport under the watchful eyes of Dronacharya awardee Sanjay Chakraverty and B. P. Bam at the Maharashtra Rifle Association.

== Career ==
In 1993, representing Maharashtra Rifle Association, Shirur won three silver medals at the Maharashtra State Championship. Following her win at the Junior National Championships in 1994 in Chennai, she became the junior national champion. She then represented her home state of Karnataka at the 1997 National Games in Bangalore, where she won the gold medal in the 10 metre air rifle event.

Shirur made her name at the international stage winning medals at the 2002 Asian Games in Busan and the 2002 Commonwealth Games in Manchester, where she won medals in the individual and team events of 10 metre air rifle. In 2004, at the Asian Shooting Championships in Kuala Lumpur, she equalled the world record in the qualification round when she scored the maximum of 400 points. She went on to win the gold medal in the event, scoring a total of 502.3 points in the final. This allowed her to qualify for the 2004 Summer Olympics. At the 2004 Summer Olympics in Athens, Shirur stood eighth in the final, having scored a total of 497.2 points in the event. At the 2005 Championships in Bangkok, she won the bronze medal. In 2008, she won the gold medal at the Hungarian Open in Győr, finished in fourth place in the ISSF World Cup in Rio de Janeiro, and was part of the team that won the team gold at the Asian Airgun Championship in Nanjing.

Following a hiatus, Shirur returned to competitive shooting in 2010, winning a gold medal at the InterShoot competition in the Netherlands. At the 2010 Commonwealth Games in Delhi, she won the bronze medal in the pairs event with Kavita Yadav. She won an individual gold medal at the National Shooting Championship at New Delhi in January 2011 representing Indian Railways.

In 2006, she founded the Lakshya Shooting Club in New Panvel, an organization to support budding shooters, with the mission of "Live for the glory of the game. Strive for perfection. Create and instill confidence, with sportsmanship spirit". She continued playing and coaching in parallel, and retired from active competition in 2018 when she was appointed as coach of the Indian junior rifle team.

== Personal life ==
Shirur is married to Siddharth Shirur, an architect.

== International medals ==
- Asian Games 2002, Busan, South Korea | Silver Medal - 10 m air rifle team
- Commonwealth Games 2002, Manchester | 2 Medals - Gold in 10 m air rifle pairs and Silver in 10 m air rifle individual event
- Asian Shooting Championship 2004, Kuala Lumpur, Malaysia | Gold Medal - 10 m air rifle
- Asian Shooting Championships, 2005, Bangkok, Thailand | Bronze Medal - 10 m air rifle
- Asian Games 2006, Doha, Qatar | Bronze Medal - 10 m air rifle team
- Asian Air Gun Championship 2008, Nanjing, China | Gold Medal - 10 m air rifle team
- Hungarian Open 2008, Győr, Hungary | Gold Medal - 10 m air rifle
- Intershoot 2008, The Hague, Netherlands | Gold Medal - 10 m air rifle (Day 2)
- Intershoot 2010, The Hague, Netherlands | Gold Medal (Days 2 and 3) and Bronze Medal (Day 1) - 10 m air rifle; Gold Medal (Days 1–3) - 10 m air rifle team
- Commonwealth Games 2010, New Delhi, India | Bronze Medal - 10 m air rifle pairs
- Intershoot 2014, The Hague, Netherlands | Bronze Medal - 10 m air rifle (Day 3)
- Intershoot 2015, The Hague, Netherlands | Silver Medal - 10 m air rifle (Day 3)
- Asian Air Gun Championship 2016, Tehran | Silver Medal

== Awards and recognition ==
- Shiv Chatrapati Krida Puraskar in 1996 by Govt of Maharashtra
- Arjuna Award in 2002 by Govt of India
- Sportswoman of the Year in 2005 by Hero Honda Sports Awards
- Dronacharya Award (para shooting) in 2022 by Govt of India
- 2024 Indian Sports Honours: Coach of the Year Female
