= Barbara Engleder =

German rifle shooter (born 1982)

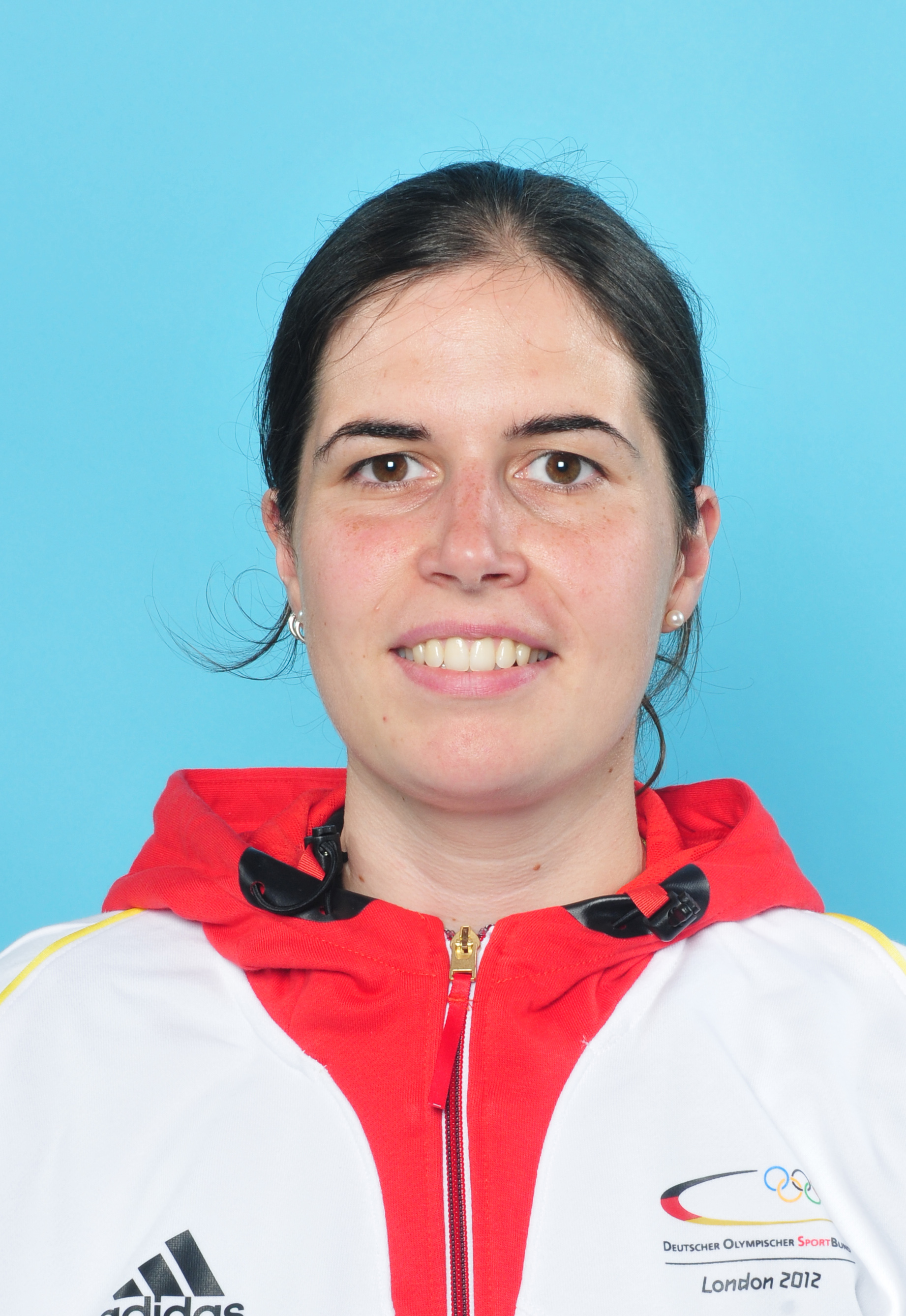
- Barbara Engleder 2012

Personal information
- Nationality: German
- Born: 16 September 1982 (age 43) Eggenfelden, West Germany
- Height: 5 ft 4 in (163 cm)
- Weight: 141 lb (64 kg)

Sport
- Country: Germany
- Sport: Sports shooting

Achievements and titles
- Olympic finals: 2012, 2016
Medal record
Women's shooting
Representing Germany
Olympic Games
Gold medal – first place	2016 Rio de Janeiro	Women's 50 metre rifle three positions
World Championships
Gold medal – first place	2010 Munich	50 m rifle three positions
Gold medal – first place	2014 Granada	10 m air rifle team
Gold medal – first place	2014 Granada	50 m rifle prone team
Gold medal – first place	2014 Granada	50 m rifle three positions team
Silver medal – second place	2010 Munich	50 m rifle three positions team

Barbara Engleder (née Lechner; born 16 September 1982, in Eggenfelden) is a German rifle shooter. She competed in the 50 m rifle three positions event at the 2012 Summer Olympics, where she placed 6th in the final. She won gold at the 50 m rifle three positions event at the 2016 Summer Olympics
