= Judo at the 2015 Summer Universiade – Men's heavyweight =

Judo competition

Judo Men's +100 kg at the 2015 Summer Universiade
- Venue: Yeomju Bitgoeul Gymnasium
- Location: Gwangju, South Korea
- Date: 4 July 2015
- Competitors: 25 from 25 nations

Medalists
gold medal	Hisayoshi Harasawa	Japan
silver medal	Magomed Nazhmudinov	Russia
bronze medal	Nabil Zalagh	France
bronze medal	Vladut Simionescu	Romania

Competition at external databases
- Links: JudoInside

The men's heavyweight competition Judo at the 2015 Summer Universiade in Gwangju was held on 5 July at the Yeomju Bitgoeul Gymnasium.

== Schedule ==
All times are Korea Standard Time (UTC+09:00)

Date	Time	Event
Saturday, 4 July 2015	09:00	Elimination round of 32
Saturday, 4 July 2015	10:00	Elimination round of 16
Saturday, 4 July 2015	11:00	Quarterfinals
Saturday, 4 July 2015	12:00	Semifinals
Saturday, 4 July 2015	13:00	Final of repechage
Saturday, 4 July 2015	17:00	Bronze medal contests
Saturday, 4 July 2015	18:00	Gold medal contest

== Results ==
=== Main bracket ===
==== Final ====
Gold medal contest
Hisayoshi Harasawa (JPN)	000
Magomed Nazhmudinov (RUS)	000

==== Top half ====
Elimination round of 32
Sugarjargal Boldpurev (MGL)	000
Juhan Mettis (EST)	100
Lee Po-yen(TPE)	010
Sofiane Bennaceur (ALG)	000
Pierre Borkowski (GER)	001
Michal Horak (CZE)	101
Hisayoshi Harasawa (JPN)	100
Kim Soowhan (KOR)	000
Jorge Barrionuevo (ARG)	000
Boltoboy Baltaev (UZB)	100

Elimination round of 16
Juhan Mettis (EST)	101
J.Juscelino Nascimento (BRA)	000
Lee Po-yen(TPE)	000
Vladut Simionescu (ROU)	100
Michal Horak (CZE)	001
Frank Paredes (VEN)	000
Hisayoshi Harasawa (JPN)	100
Boltoboy Baltaev (UZB)	000

Quarterfinals
Juhan Mettis (EST)	001
Vladut Simionescu (ROU)	100
Michal Horak (CZE)	000
Hisayoshi Harasawa (JPN)	101

Semifinals
Vladut Simionescu (ROU)	000
Hisayoshi Harasawa (JPN)	010

==== Bottom half ====
Elimination round of 32
Kamil Grabowski (POL)	000
Magomed Nazhmudinov (RUS)	101
Amit Dhull (IND)	101
Sarikhan Ismailov (KGZ)	000
Sidhartha Raj (USA)	000
Wang Yuntao (CHN)	001
~~Mohamed Jalloh~~ (SLE)
Nabil Zalagh (FRA)

Elimination round of 16
Magomed Nazhmudinov (RUS)	101
Yelaman Yergaliyev (KAZ)	000
Diogo Silva (POR)	100
Amit Dhull (IND)	000
Wang Yuntao (CHN)	101
Nabil Zalagh (FRA)	000
Anton Rudnyk (UKR)	101
Vito Dragič (SLO)	000

Quarterfinals
Magomed Nazhmudinov (RUS)	100
Diogo Silva (POR)	000
Wang Yuntao (CHN)	102
Anton Rudnyk (UKR)	13

Semifinals
Magomed Nazhmudinov (RUS)	100
Wang Yuntao (CHN)	000

=== Repechage ===
Repechage 1
Kim Soowhan (KOR)	110
Boltoboy Baltaev (UZB)	000

Repechage 2
Lee Po-yen(TPE)	000
Juhan Mettis (EST)	100
Kim Soowhan (KOR)	100
Michal Horak (CZE)	000

Repechage 3
Juhan Mettis (EST)	100
Michal Horak (CZE)	000

Bronze Medal
Juhan Mettis (EST)	000
Nabil Zalagh (FRA)	100

Repechage 1
Kamil Grabowski (POL)	000
Yelaman Yergaliyev (KAZ)	100

Repechage 2
Yelaman Yergaliyev (KAZ)	100
Diogo Silva (POR)	000
Yuntao Wang (CHN)	000
Anton Rudnyk (UKR)	100

Repechage 3
Yelaman Yergaliyev (KAZ)	100
Anton Rudnyk (UKR)	000

Bronze Medal
Yelaman Yergaliyev (KAZ)	000
Vladut Simionescu (ROU)	101
