= Diving at the 2015 Summer Universiade – Women's 10 metre platform =

Women's 10 metre platform at the 2015 Summer Universiade
- Venue: Nambu University International Aquatics Center
- Date: July 5, 2015
- Competitors: 17 from 11 nations

Medalists
gold medal	Wang Ying	China
silver medal	Wang Han	China
bronze medal	Mai Nakagawa	South Korea

The Women's 10 metre platform diving competition at the 2015 Summer Universiade in Gwangju was held on 5 July at the Nambu University International Aquatics Center.

== Schedule ==
All times are Korea Standard Time (UTC+09:00)

Date	Time	Event
Sunday, 5 July 2015	11:00	Preliminary
Sunday, 5 July 2015	13:00	Semifinals
Sunday, 5 July 2015	16:05	Final

== Results ==
Rank	Athletes	Preliminary		Semi-final		Dive					Final
Rank	Athletes	Points	Rank	Points	Rank	1	2	3	4	5	Final
1st place, gold medalist(s)	Wang Ying (CHN)	303.10	5	327.60	3	62.40	58.50	67.20	76.50	73.60	345.00
2nd place, silver medalist(s)	Wang Han (CHN)	321.60	3	353.60	1	76.50	73.60	49.50	75.20	70.20	338.20
3rd place, bronze medalist(s)	Mai Nakagawa (JPN)	301.10	7	322.30	4	64.40	72.00	64.00	54.45	75.20	330.05
4	Celina Jayne Toth (CAN)	329.85	1	287.50	9	60.20	62.40	67.50	65.25	67.20	322.55
5	Robyn Natalie Birch (GBR)	312.70	4	269.20	11	51.00	62.40	63.00	67.20	72.00	315.60
6	Carol-Ann Ware (CAN)	325.85	2	294.55	7	62.40	51.15	71.05	57.00	70.40	312.00
7	Olivia Rosendahl (USA)	281.20	9	292.00	8	46.40	65.80	56.55	72.80	68.60	310.15
8	Ko Eun-Ji (KOR)	266.25	11	303.50	5	53.65	67.20	56.55	65.80	61.50	304.70
9	Daria Govor (RUS)	296.65	8	283.65	10	70.50	54.25	65.60	31.35	65.60	287.30
10	Taneka Kovchenko (AUS)	268.15	10	329.00	2	68.80	45.00	60.20	60.90	49.60	284.50
11	Traisy Vivien Anak Tukiet (MAS)	233.90	16	296.70	6	57.00	62.40	52.20	51.80	57.60	281.00
12	Tatsumi Fuka (JPN)	240.80	13	267.25	12	55.50	48.00	59.40	63.80	48.00	274.70
13	Anastasia Kozlova (RUS)	240.75	14	250.25	13						
14	Gyoengyver Kormos (HUN)	258.25	12	248.90	14						
15	Moon Na-Yun (KOR)	302.15	6	238.05	15						
16	Daniela Zambrano Montiel (MEX)	230.85	17	210.80	16						
17	Elina Ridel (RUS)	238.70	15								
