= Diving at the 2015 Summer Universiade – Women's 1 metre springboard =

Women's 1 m springboard at the 2015 Summer Universiade
- Venue: Nambu University International Aquatics Center
- Date: July 5, 2015
- Competitors: 21 from 12 nations

Medalists
gold medal	Zheng Shuangxue	China
silver medal	Kim Na-mi	South Korea
bronze medal	Sun Mengchen	China

The Women's 1 metre springboard diving competition at the 2015 Summer Universiade in Gwangju was held on 3–4 July at the Nambu University International Aquatics Center.

== Schedule ==
All times are Korea Standard Time (UTC+09:00)

Date	Time	Event
Friday, 3 July 2015	10:00	Preliminary
Friday, 3 July 2015	14:45	Semifinals
Saturday, 4 July 2015	13:15	Final

== Results ==
Rank	Athletes	Preliminary		Semi-final		Dive					Final
Rank	Athletes	Points	Rank	Points	Rank	1	2	3	4	5	Final
1st place, gold medalist(s)	Zheng Shuangxue (CHN)	282.85	1			55.2	55.2	58.8	58.5	58.5	286.20
2nd place, silver medalist(s)	Kim Na-mi (KOR)	251.00	5	248.70	5	54	54.05	56.4	59.8	50.7	274.95
3rd place, bronze medalist(s)	Sun Mengchen (CHN)	279.05	2			54	51.75	54	58.5	54.6	272.85
4	Yuka Mabuchi (JPN)	247.60	8	248.80	4	46.2	58.5	43.2	50.6	54	252.50
5	Laura Bilotta (ITA)	237.80	11	246.55	6	54	54.6	43.7	46.8	46.2	245.30
6	Jessica-Floriane Favre (SUI)	244.25	9	250.50	2	50.4	58.5	42.9	33.35	46.8	231.95
7	Olga Kulemina (RUS)	247.60	7	253.20	1	54.6	52	39.1	50.4	34.8	230.90
8	Rachel Mumma (USA)	261.70	3	249.15	3	54	43.7	32.4	40.3	48.1	218.50
9	Samantha Pickens (USA)	240.20	10	245.75	7						
10	Daria Govor (RUS)	256.60	4	244.10	8						
11	Haruka Enomoto (JPN)	235.25	12	228.40	9						
12	Clare Michelle Cryan (GBR)	234.70	13	209.90	10						
13	Zheng Qulin (CHN)	247.90	6								
14	Kam Ling Kar (MAS)	233.90	14								
15	Anabelle Smith (AUS)	231.25	15								
16	Taina Karvonen (FIN)	229.50	16								
17	Rhea Elizabeth Vernese Gayle (GBR)	227.05	17								
18	Iira Laatunen (FIN)	224.40	18								
19	Lauren Reedy (USA)	224.20	19								
20	Jasmine Lai Pui Yee (MAS)	221.10	20								
21	Irina Anikina (RUS)	220.95	21								
22	Daniela Zambrano Montiel (MEX)	209.25	22								
23	Moon Na-yun (KOR)	201.05	23								
24	Flora Piroska Gondos (HUN)	191.20	24								
25	Kahlia Warner (AUS)	179.35	25								
26	Maria Natalie Dinda Anasti (INA)	135.45	26								
—	Linadini Yasmin (INA)	DNS									
