= Swimming at the 2015 Summer Universiade – Men's 800 metre freestyle =

Men's 800 metre freestyle at the 2015 Summer Universiade
- Venue: Nambu University International Aquatics Center
- Date: July 5, 2015
- Competitors: 23 from 16 nations
- Winning time: 7:50.28

Medalists
gold medal	Sergii Frolov	Ukraine
silver medal	Jay Steven John Lelliott	Great Britain
bronze medal	Ayatsugu Hirai	Japan

The men's 800 metre swimming competition at the 2015 Summer Universiade in Gwangju was held on 4–5 July at the Nambu University International Aquatics Center.

== Schedule ==
All times are Korea Standard Time (UTC+09:00)

Date	Time	Event
Saturday, 4 July 2015	08:30	Heat 1
Saturday, 4 July 2015	08:39	Heat 2
Saturday, 4 July 2015	08:45	Heat 3
Sunday, 5 July 2015	19:00	Final

== Results ==
=== Heats ===
Rank	Heat	Lane	Athlete	Time	Notes
1	3	6	Jay Steven John Lelliott (GBR)	7:55.81	Q
2	2	7	Janardana Burns (USA)	7:59.06	Q
3	2	4	Sergii Frolov (UKR)	7:59.88	Q
4	2	5	Ayatsugu Hirai (JPN)	8:00.69	Q
5	3	7	Arthur Frayler (USA)	8:00.93	Q
6	3	2	Jack McLoughlin (AUS)	8:01.21	Q
7	3	4	Jordan Harrison (AUS)	8:01.3	Q
8	2	3	Kohei Yamamoto (JPN)	8:03.69	Q
9	2	2	Aleksandr Fedorev (RUS)	8:03.98	
10	3	3	Paweł Furtek (POL)	8:04.02	
11	3	1	Matteo Furlan (ITA)	8:06.34	
12	3	5	Maksym Shemberev (UKR)	8:07.5	
13	2	1	Adam Paulsson (SWE)	8:08.61	
14	2	8	Ediz Yıldırımer (TUR)	8:11.19	
15	2	6	Evgeny Kulikov (RUS)	8:12.13	
16	3	8	Philippe Guertin (CAN)	8:15.33	
17	1	7	Matěj Kozubek (CZE)	8:35.37	
18	1	5	Li Zhongyi (CHN)	8:42.98	
19	1	4	Juan Jose Segovia Ramos (VEN)	8:43.48	
20	1	2	Jux Keaton Solita (PHI)	9:22.14	
21	1	3	Musallam Abdullah Musall Al-Khaduri (OMA)	9:41.26	
22	1	6	Nidhal Sulaiman Mohsin Al-Harrasi (OMA)	9:45.94	
23	1	1	Ramon Alfonso de Marcaida (PHI)	13:20.23	

=== Final ===
Rank	Lane	Athlete	Time	Notes
1st place, gold medalist(s)	3	Sergii Frolov (UKR)	7:50.28	
2nd place, silver medalist(s)	4	Jay Steven John Lelliott (GBR)	7:50.97	
3rd place, bronze medalist(s)	6	Ayatsugu Hirai (JPN)	7:52.77	
4	5	Janardana Burns (USA)	7:56.53	
5	7	Jack McLoughlin (AUS)	7:57.76	
6	8	Kohei Yamamoto (JPN)	7:57.84	
7	2	Arthur Frayler (USA)	7:59.09	
8	1	Jordan Harrison (AUS)	8:10.40	
