= Koptelov =

Koptelov may refer to:

- Asteroid 3968 Koptelov, named after Afanasij Lazarevich Koptelov, Soviet writer
- Evgeny Koptelov (born 1998), Russian swimmer
