= Shooting at the 2015 Summer Universiade =

Shooting at the XXVIII Summer Universiade
- Venue: Naju Jeollanamdo Shooting Range
- Dates: July 5, 2015 – July 10, 2015

Shooting was contested at the 2015 Summer Universiade from July 5 to 10 at the Naju Jeollanamdo Shooting Range in Naju, South Korea.

== Medal summary ==
=== Medal table ===
* Host nation (South Korea)

Rank	Nation	Gold	Silver	Bronze	Total
1	China	8	6	3	17
2	South Korea*	6	3	4	13
3	Italy	5	3	2	10
4	Russia	3	11	7	21
5	France	3	1	2	6
6	Iran	2	1	3	6
7	Czech Republic	2	1	0	3
8	Thailand	1	3	1	5
9	Mongolia	1	1	1	3
10	Turkey	1	0	1	2
11	Cyprus	1	0	0	1
11	Romania	1	0	0	1
13	Poland	0	2	0	2
14	Serbia	0	1	1	2
14	Slovakia	0	1	1	2
16	India	0	0	3	3
17	Australia	0	0	2	2
17	Kazakhstan	0	0	2	2
19	Chinese Taipei	0	0	1	1
Totals (19 entries)		34	34	34	102

=== Men's events ===
==== Individual ====
Event	Gold	Silver	Bronze
10 metre air pistol	Enkhtaivan Davaakhuu; Mongolia	Wang Zhiwei; China	Jang Ha-lim; South Korea
10 metre air rifle	Liu Zhiguo; China	Yang Haoran; China	Park Sung-hyun; South Korea
25 metre standard pistol	Jean Quiquampoix; France	Wang Zhiwei; China	Dmitry Brayko; Russia
25 metre rapid fire pistol	Chen Kehan; China	Nikita Sukhanov; Russia	Jean Quiquampoix; France
50 metre pistol	Park Dae-hun; South Korea	Rinat Aiupov; Russia	Wang Zhiwei; China
50 metre rifle prone	Kirill Grigorian; Russia	Bartosz Jasiecki; Poland	Yang Haoran; China
50 metre rifle three positions	Yang Haoran; China	Kirill Grigorian; Russia	Alexis Raynaud; France
Skeet	Menelaos Michaelides; Cyprus	Alexander Bondar; Russia	Michael Palmieri; Italy
Trap	Valerio Grazini; Italy	Filip Marinov; Slovakia	Yavuz Ilnam; Turkey
Double trap	Andrea Vescovi; Italy	Artem Nekrasov; Russia	Alessandro Chianese; Italy

==== Team ====
Event	Gold	Silver	Bronze
10 metre air pistol	South Korea (KOR); Jang Ha-lim; Park Dae-hun; Seo Jin-sung	Mongolia (MGL); Enkhtaivan Davaakhuu; Enkhtaivan Badamgarav; Oyun Tuguldur	Russia (RUS); Nikolai Kilin; Rinat Aiupov; Ruslan Visloguzov
10 metre air rifle	China (CHN); Yang Haoran; Liu Zhiguo; Yang Jiazhou	South Korea (KOR); Park Sung-hyun; Kim Hyeon-jun; Lee Jea-won	India (IND); Akhil Sheoran; Harmanvir Singh; Ekambir Singh
25 metre standard pistol	France (FRA); Jean Quiquampoix; Florian Fouquet; Vincent Polo	China (CHN); Wang Zhiwei; Chen Kehan; Cao Heyuan	Russia (RUS); Dmitry Brayko; Andrei Shchepetkov; Nikita Sukhanov
25 metre rapid fire pistol	Russia (RUS); Nikita Sukhanov; Andrei Shchepetkov; Dmitry Brayko	South Korea (KOR); Park Jun-woo; Han Sang-hun; Lee Kyung-won	India (IND); Achal Pratap Singh Grewal; Amrender Pal Singh Chauhan; Akshay Jain
50 metre pistol	South Korea (KOR); Park Dae-hun; Jang Ha-lim; Lee Tae-hwan	Russia (RUS); Rinat Aiupov; Nikolai Kilin; Ruslan Visloguzov	Mongolia (MGL); Enkhtaivan Davaakhuu; Oyun Tuguldur; Enkhtaivan Badamgarav
50 metre rifle prone	France (FRA); Alexis Raynaud; Remi Moreno Flores; Etienne Germond	Poland (POL); Bartosz Jasiecki; Maciej Wojtasiak; Paweł Pietruk	South Korea (KOR); Kim Hyeon-jun; Lee Won-gyu; Kwon Il-gu
50 metre rifle three positions	China (CHN); Liu Zhiguo; Yang Haoran; Zhao Zhonghao	France (FRA); Alexis Raynaud; Etienne Germond; Brian Baudouin	Russia (RUS); Kirill Grigorian; Dmitrii Sedov; Mikhail Burchalin
Skeet	Russia (RUS); Alexander Bondar; Nikolay Teplyy; Anatoly Fedorov	Italy (ITA); Michael Palmieri; Giancarlo Tazza; Antonio Morandini	Kazakhstan (KAZ); Andrey Frolov; Alexandr Yechshenko; Vladimir Pochivalov
Trap	Turkey (TUR); Yavuz Ilnam; Erdinç Kebapçı; Nedim Tolga Tunçer	Italy (ITA); Valerio Grazini; Andrea Miotto; Diego Meoni	Slovakia (SVK); Filip Marinov; Július Vass; Matúš Dudo
Double trap	Italy (ITA); Alessandro Chianese; Andrea Vescovi; Ignazio Maria Tronca	Russia (RUS); Anton Slepushkin; Artem Nekrasov; Maksim Lazarev	India (IND); Ankur Mittal; Asgar Hussain Khan; Namanveer Brar

=== Women's events ===
==== Individual ====
Event	Gold	Silver	Bronze
10 metre air pistol	Han Ji-young; South Korea	Princhuda Methaweewong; Thailand	Wu Chia-ying; Chinese Taipei
10 metre air rifle	Najmeh Khedmati; Iran	Gabriela Vognarová; Czech Republic	Ivana Maksimović; Serbia
25 metre pistol	Kim Ji-hye; South Korea	Zhou Qingyuan; China	Lin Yuemei; China
50 metre rifle prone	Mahlagha Jambozorg; Iran	Kim Mi-so; South Korea	Sununta Majchacheep; Thailand
50 metre rifle three positions	Laura-Georgeta Ilie; Romania	Valentina Protasova; Russia	Najmeh Khedmati; Iran
Skeet	Libuše Jahodová; Czech Republic	Natalia Vinogradova; Russia	Maria Meleshchenko; Russia
Trap	Silvana Maria Stanco; Italy	Federica Caporsucio; Italy	Catherine Skinner; Australia

==== Team ====
Event	Gold	Silver	Bronze
10 metre air pistol	China (CHN); Huang Xiao; Lin Yuemei; Zhou Qingyuan	Thailand (THA); Tanyaporn Prucksakorn; Princhuda Methaweewong; Pim-on Klaisuban	Russia (RUS); Margarita Semenova; Alena Doroshkevich; Regina Rizvanova
10 metre air rifle	China (CHN); Chen Dongqi; Yi Siling; Liu Yishuo	Serbia (SRB); Ivana Maksimović; Katarina Biserčić; Dragana Todorović	Iran (IRI); Najmeh Khedmati; Mahlagha Jambozorg; Maedeh Aminzadeh
25 metre pistol	South Korea (KOR); Kim Ji-hye; Cho Mun-hyeon; Han Ji-young	Thailand (THA); Tanyaporn Prucksakorn; Naphaswan Yangpaiboon; Pim-on Klaisuban	Russia (RUS); Anastasia Ryzhikh; Margarita Semenova; Alena Doroshkevich
50 metre rifle prone	Thailand (THA); Sununta Majchacheep; Ratchadaporn Plengsaengthong; Thanyalak Chotphibunsin	China (CHN); Li Peijing; Chen Dongqi; Chen Fang	Iran (IRI); Maryam Talebi; Najmeh Khedmati; Mahlagha Jambozorg
50 metre rifle three positions	China (CHN); Chen Dongqi; Yi Siling; Chen Fang	Iran (IRI); Najmeh Khedmati; Mahlagha Jambozorg; Maryam Talebi	South Korea (KOR); Yoo Seo-young; Joo Hyun-ji; Kim Mi-so
Skeet	Czech Republic (CZE); Jitka Pešková; Libuše Jahodová; Barbora Šumová	Russia (RUS); Maria Meleshchenko; Natalia Vinogradova; Ekaterina Begoulova	Kazakhstan (KAZ); Assem Orynbay; Zhaniya Aidarkhanova; Angelina Michshuk
Trap	Italy (ITA); Silvana Maria Stanco; Federica Caporsucio; Valeria Raffaelli	Russia (RUS); Svetlana Krasheninnikova; Zoia Khokhlova; Ekaterina Rabaya	Australia (AUS); Catherine Skinner; Gemma Dunn; Indi Gladman
