= Ireland at the 2015 Summer Universiade =

- IOC code: IRL
- NOC: National Olympic Committee of Ireland

in Gwangju, South Korea 3 – 14 July 2015
- Competitors: 64 in 6 sports
- Medals Ranked 36th: Gold 1 Silver 1 Bronze 1 Total 3

Summer Universiade appearances
- 1959; 1961; 1963; 1965; 1967; 1970; 1973; 1975; 1977; 1979; 1981; 1983; 1985; 1987; 1989; 1991; 1993; 1995; 1997; 1999; 2001; 2003; 2005; 2007; 2009; 2011; 2013; 2015; 2017; 2019; 2021; 2025; 2027

Ireland participated at the 2015 Summer Universiade, in Gwangju, South Korea.

== Competitors ==
| Sport | Men | Women | Total |
|---|---|---|---|
| Archery | 2 | 0 | 2 |
| Athletics | 4 | 1 | 5 |
| Football | 20 | 20 | 40 |
| Golf | 3 | 3 | 6 |
| Judo | 1 | 0 | 1 |
| Swimming | 5 | 5 | 10 |
| Total | 35 | 29 | 64 |

== Medals by sport ==
| Sport | Men | | | | Women | | | | Grand Total | | | |
| Sport | 1st place, gold medalist(s) | 2nd place, silver medalist(s) | 3rd place, bronze medalist(s) | Total | 1st place, gold medalist(s) | 2nd place, silver medalist(s) | 3rd place, bronze medalist(s) | Total | 1st place, gold medalist(s) | 2nd place, silver medalist(s) | 3rd place, bronze medalist(s) | Total |
|---|---|---|---|---|---|---|---|---|---|---|---|---|
| Athletics | 1 | 0 | 0 | 1 | 0 | 0 | 0 | 0 | 1 | 0 | 0 | 1 |
| Swimming | 0 | 0 | 0 | 0 | 0 | 1 | 1 | 2 | 0 | 1 | 1 | 2 |

== Medalists ==
| Medal | Name | Sport | Event | Date |
|---|---|---|---|---|
| Gold | Thomas Barr | Athletics | Men's 400 metres hurdles | 12 July |
| Silver | Fiona Doyle | Swimming | 50 metre breatstroke | 11 July |
| Bronze | Fiona Doyle | Swimming | 100 metre breaststroke | 11 July |
