= Diving at the 2015 Summer Universiade – Men's 1 metre springboard =

Men's 1 m springboard at the 2015 Summer Universiade
- Venue: Nambu University International Aquatics Center
- Date: 6 July 2015; 10 years ago
- Competitors: 21 from 12 nations

Medalists
gold medal	Peng Jianfeng	China
silver medal	Zhang Xinghao	China
bronze medal	Briadam Herrera	United States

The Men's 1 metre springboard diving competition at the 2015 Summer Universiade in Gwangju was held on 6 July 2015 at the Nambu University International Aquatics Center.

== Schedule ==
All times are Korea Standard Time (UTC+09:00)

Date	Time	Event
Monday, 5 July 2015	11:00	Preliminary
Monday, 5 July 2015	13:30	Semifinals
Monday, 5 July 2015	15:55	Final

== Results ==
Rank	Athletes	Preliminary		Semi-final		Dive						Final
Rank	Athletes	Points	Rank	Points	Rank	1	2	3	4	5	6	Final
1st place, gold medalist(s)	Peng Jianfeng (CHN)	425.10	1			58.5	76.5	81	81.6	79.2	73.6	450.40
2nd place, silver medalist(s)	Zhong Xinghao (CHN)	354.70	7	369.50	1	61.5	81.6	65.6	63	62.4	63	397.10
3rd place, bronze medalist(s)	Briadam Herrera (USA)	399.20	2			67.2	66	62.4	64.35	66.3	61.5	387.75
4	Evgenii Novoselov (RUS)	349.75	8	355.65	3	69	72	60	61.2	44.55	72	378.75
5	Viacheslav Novoselov (RUS)	357.20	5	352.60	4	58.5	45	67.5	66.3	63	57.6	357.90
6	Kim Yeong-Nam (KOR)	362.75	3	351.20	5	43.4	49.5	67.2	52.5	76.8	64.5	353.90
7	Cameron Mclean (CAN)	355.30	6	356.25	2	61.1	71.3	45	42	70.5	48	337.90
8	Gabriele Auber (ITA)	331.45	11	344.35	6	57.2	62.4	60	38.75	58.9	48.3	325.55
9	Kim Jin-Yong (KOR)	338.25	9	339.00	7							
10	Daniel A Islas Arroyo (MEX)	329.55	12	336.15	8							
11	Jack Nyquist (USA)	336.85	10	307.05	9							
12	Jack Ryan Haslam (GBR)	357.20	4	286.65	10							
13	Andreas Nader Billi (ITA)	308.95	13									
14	Rodrigo Diego Lopez (MEX)	308.30	14									
15	Aleksandr Kandrashin (RUS)	306.75	15									
16	Bradley Christensen (USA)	302.70	16									
17	Jouni Antero Kallunki (FIN)	297.70	17									
18	Oliver Armstrong-Scott (NZL)	282.90	18									
19	Johannes Donay (GER)	282.85	19									
20	Florian Fandler (GER)	273.30	20									
21	Heikki Maekikallio (FIN)	256.45	21									
