= Jacob Hansford =

Australian swimmer

Personal information
- Full name: Jacob Ross Hansford
- Nationality: Australian
- Born: 28 September 1995 (age 30) Baulkham Hills, New South Wales, Australia

Sport
- Sport: Swimming
- Strokes: Freestyle
Medal record
Men's swimming
Representing Australia
Universiade
Silver medal – second place	2015 Gwangju	4×200 m freestyle
Bronze medal – third place	2015 Gwangju	200 m freestyle
Bronze medal – third place	2019 Naples	4×200 m freestyle
Junior Pan Pacific Championships
Bronze medal – third place	2014 Maui	4×200 m freestyle

Jacob Hansford (born 28 September 1995) is an Australian swimmer. He competed in the men's 4 × 200 metre freestyle relay event at the 2016 Summer Olympics.
