= Diving at the 2017 Summer Universiade – Women's 10 metre platform =

Women's 10 metre platform at the Universiade
- Venue: University of Taipei (Tianmu) Shin-hsin Hall B1 Diving Pool
- Dates: 22–23 August 2017
- Competitors: 19 from 11 nations

Medalists
1st place, gold medalist(s)		Kim Kuk-hyang	North Korea
2nd place, silver medalist(s)		Kim Un-hyang	North Korea
3rd place, bronze medalist(s)		Celina Jayne Toth	Canada

The women's 10 metre platform diving event at the 2017 Summer Universiade was contested from August 22 to 23 at the University of Taipei (Tianmu) Shin-hsin Hall B1 Diving Pool in Taipei, Taiwan.

== Schedule ==
All times are Taiwan Standard Time (UTC+08:00)

Date	Time	Event
Tuesday, 22 August 2017	10:00	Preliminary
Tuesday, 22 August 2017	13:00	Semifinals
Wednesday, 23 August 2017	16:00	Final

== Results ==
Qualified for the next phase

=== Preliminary ===
Rank	Athlete	Dive					Total
Rank	Athlete	1	2	3	4	5	Total
1	Kim Kuk-hyang (PRK)	70.50	81.60	78.30	76.80	78.40	385.60
2	Kim Su-ji (KOR)	61.60	66.00	59.45	64.40	63.80	315.25
3	Kim Un-hyang (PRK)	72.00	51.20	69.30	56.00	65.60	314.10
4	Olivia Louise Rosendahl (USA)	49.60	65.60	70.40	59.45	54.60	299.65
5	Haruka Enomoto (JPN)	70.00	60.80	56.55	46.50	54.60	288.45
6	Elaena Nancy Dick (CAN)	46.20	66.00	57.60	57.60	60.80	288.20
7	Emily Kate Meaney (AUS)	51.20	60.00	52.20	44.80	68.80	277.00
8	Iuliia Timoshinina (RUS)	66.00	52.70	42.75	36.30	73.60	271.35
9	Daniela Zambrano (MEX)	36.00	60.00	64.00	44.40	60.90	265.30
10	Choe Hyang (PRK)	66.00	67.20	49.60	26.10	54.40	263.30
11	Ganna Krasnoshlyk (UKR)	30.80	64.50	59.45	47.85	49.00	251.60
12	Brittany Mae O'Brien (AUS)	44.80	63.00	42.90	38.40	62.40	251.50
13	Hana Kaneto (JPN)	63.80	35.00	50.40	40.30	55.35	244.85
14	Celina Jayne Toth (CAN)	58.80	72.00	36.00	34.65	36.80	238.25
15	Kieu Trang Duong (GER)	58.50	48.00	24.75	49.00	52.80	233.05
16	Yulia Tikhomirova (RUS)	35.15	46.80	51.80	48.00	43.20	224.95
17	Paola Flaminio (ITA)	53.20	35.10	27.55	58.80	46.40	221.05
18	Laura Elizabeth Hingston (AUS)	38.40	56.00	52.20	37.80	24.00	208.40
19	Flavia Pallotta (ITA)	46.80	33.60	48.60	28.00	44.40	201.40

=== Semifinal ===
Rank	Athlete	Dive					Total
Rank	Athlete	1	2	3	4	5	Total
1	Kim Kuk-hyang (PRK)	72.00	78.40	56.55	76.80	76.80	360.55
2	Brittany Mae O'Brien (AUS)	54.60	55.50	69.30	60.80	65.60	305.80
3	Elaena Nancy Dick (CAN)	37.80	72.00	67.20	51.20	68.80	297.00
4	Kim Su-ji (KOR)	67.20	54.00	62.35	56.00	52.20	291.75
5	Celina Jayne Toth (CAN)	63.00	72.00	66.00	44.55	40.00	285.55
6	Olivia Louise Rosendahl (USA)	70.40	51.20	41.60	60.90	60.20	284.30
7	Haruka Enomoto (JPN)	68.60	49.60	69.60	49.50	42.00	279.30
8	Iuliia Timoshinina (RUS)	52.50	65.10	42.75	56.10	59.20	275.65
9	Kim Un-hyang (PRK)	51.00	60.80	44.55	59.20	57.60	273.15
10	Ganna Krasnoshlyk (UKR)	67.20	43.50	56.55	43.50	58.80	269.55
11	Emily Kate Meaney (AUS)	57.60	43.50	52.20	48.00	56.00	257.30
12	Daniela Zambrano (MEX)	30.00	57.00	62.40	44.40	58.00	251.80
13	Yulia Tikhomirova (RUS)	39.90	42.00	58.80	58.50	48.00	247.20
14	Kieu Trang Duong (GER)	54.00	57.60	34.65	51.80	30.40	228.45
15	Paola Flaminio (ITA)	49.00	44.55	55.10	46.20	33.35	228.20
16	Flavia Pallotta (ITA)	46.80	42.00	56.70	28.00	46.80	220.30
17	Hana Kaneto (JPN)	43.50	37.80	54.60	32.50	49.95	218.35

=== Final ===
Rank	Athlete	Dive					Total
Rank	Athlete	1	2	3	4	5	Total
1st place, gold medalist(s)	Kim Kuk-hyang (PRK)	81.00	83.20	39.15	73.60	73.60	350.55
2nd place, silver medalist(s)	Kim Un-hyang (PRK)	70.50	60.80	77.55	59.20	67.20	335.25
3rd place, bronze medalist(s)	Celina Jayne Toth (CAN)	63.00	68.80	70.50	69.30	57.60	329.20
4	Elaena Nancy Dick (CAN)	58.80	60.00	56.00	60.80	75.20	310.80
5	Brittany Mae O'Brien (CAN)	57.40	52.50	69.30	67.20	60.80	307.20
6	Iuliia Timoshinina (RUS)	69.00	65.10	57.60	37.85	76.80	306.45
7	Ganna Krasnoshlyk (UKR)	61.60	54.00	60.90	58.00	63.00	297.50
8	Olivia Louise Rosendahl (USA)	62.40	65.60	52.80	60.90	37.80	279.50
9	Kim Su-ji (KOR)	63.00	58.50	40.60	58.80	58.00	278.90
10	Emily Kate Meaney (AUS)	60.80	66.00	43.50	40.00	59.20	269.50
11	Haruka Enomoto (JPN)	53.20	36.80	42.05	52.50	58.80	243.35
12	Daniela Zambrano (MEX)	40.50	55.50	48.00	44.40	43.50	231.90
