= Zhang Sishi =

Chinese swimmer (born 1993)

Personal information
- Nationality: Chinese
- Born: 7 December 1993 (age 32)

Sport
- Sport: Swimming
Medal record
Representing China
Summer Universiade
Gold medal – first place	2015 Gwangju	200m individual medley

Zhang Sishi (born 7 December 1993) is a Chinese swimmer. She competed in the women's 200 metre individual medley event at the 2017 World Aquatics Championships.
