= Thailand at the 2015 Summer Universiade =

- IOC code: THA
- NOC: National Olympic Committee of Thailand
- Website: www.olympicthai.or.th (in Thai and English)

in Gwangju, South Korea 3 – 14 July 2015
- Competitors: 106 in 8 sports
- Medals Ranked 20th: Gold 2 Silver 7 Bronze 9 Total 18

Summer Universiade appearances (overview)
- 1985; 1987; 1989; 1991; 1993; 1995; 1997; 1999; 2001; 2003; 2005; 2007; 2009; 2011; 2013; 2015; 2017; 2019; 2021; 2025; 2027

Thailand participated at the 2015 Summer Universiade, in Gwangju, South Korea.

== Medals by sport ==
Medals by sport
Sport	1st place, gold medalist(s)	2nd place, silver medalist(s)	3rd place, bronze medalist(s)	Total
Athletics			1	1
Badminton		1	2	3
Golf			2	2
Shooting	1	3	1	5
Taekwondo	1	1	1	3
Tennis		2	2	4
Total	2	7	9	19

== Medalists ==
Medal	Name	Sport	Event	Date
Gold	Sununta Majchacheep; Ratchadaporn Plengsaengthong; Thanyalak Chotphibunsin	Shooting	Women's 50m Rifle Prone Team	6 July
Gold	Chanatip Sonkham	Taekwondo	Women's -49 kg	10 July
Silver	Naphaswan Yangpaiboon; Tanyaporn Prucksakorn; Pim-on Klaisuban	Shooting	Women's 25m Air Pistol Team	6 July
Silver	Princhuda Methaweewong	Shooting	Women's 10m Air Pistol	8 July
Silver	Princhuda Methaweewong; Tanyaporn Prucksakorn; Pim-on Klaisuban	Shooting	Women's 10m Air Pistol Team	8 July
Silver	Wilasinee Khamsribusa	Taekwondo	Women's -46 kg	9 July
Silver	Porntip Buranaprasertsuk	Badminton	Women's Singles	12 July
Silver	Luksika Kumkhum	Tennis	Women's Singles	12 July
Silver	Varatchaya Wongteanchai; Noppawan Lertcheewakarn; Luksika Kumkhum	Tennis	Women's Team	12 July
Bronze	Sununta Majchacheep	Shooting	Women's 50m Rifle Prone	7 July
Bronze	Bodin Isara; Busanan Ongbamrungphan; Chayanit Chaladchalam; Jakkit Tuntirasin; Jongkolphan Kititharakul; Nipitphon Puangpuapech; Phataimas Muenwong; Porntip Buranaprasertsuk; Rawinda Prajongjai; Sermsin Wongyaprom; Suppanyu Avihingsanon; Tanongsak Saensomboonsuk	Badminton	Mixed Team	8 July
Bronze	Rangsiya Nisaisom	Taekwondo	Women's -57 kg	9 July
Bronze	Noppawan Lertcheewakarn; Varatchaya Wongteanchai	Tennis	Women's Doubles	10 July
Bronze	Natipong Srithong	Golf	Men's Individual	11 July
Bronze	Sitanart Singhanart	Golf	Women's Individual	11 July
Bronze	Varatchaya Wongteanchai	Tennis	Women's Singles	11 July
Bronze	Khanrutai Pakdee; Phensri Chairoek; Supawan Thipat; Tassaporn Wannakit; Wanwisa Kongthong	Athletics	Women's 4 × 100 m Relay	12 July
Bronze	Bodin Isara; Nipitphon Puangpuapech	Badminton	Men's Doubles	12 July
