= Fencing at the 2015 Summer Universiade =

Fencing at the XXVIII Summer Universiade
- Venues: Kim Dae-Jung Convention Center
- Dates: July 4, 2015 – July 9, 2015

Fencing was contested at the 2015 Summer Universiade from July 4 to 9 at the Kim Dae-Jung Convention Center in Gwangju, South Korea.

== Medal summary ==
=== Medal table ===
* Host nation (South Korea)

Rank	Nation	Gold	Silver	Bronze	Total
1	France	8	2	1	11
2	South Korea*	2	2	4	8
3	Russia	1	6	3	10
4	Italy	1	0	3	4
5	Ukraine	0	2	0	2
6	Hungary	0	0	2	2
6	United States	0	0	2	2
8	Estonia	0	0	1	1
8	Poland	0	0	1	1
8	Turkey	0	0	1	1
Totals (10 entries)		12	12	18	42

=== Men's events ===
Event	Gold	Silver	Bronze
Individual épée	Yannick Borel; France	Virgile Marchal; France	Daniel Berta; Hungary
Individual épée	Yannick Borel; France	Virgile Marchal; France	Jung Tae-seung; South Korea
Individual sabre	Song Jun-hun; South Korea	Dmitry Danilenko; Russia	Ferenc Valkai; Hungary
Individual sabre	Song Jun-hun; South Korea	Dmitry Danilenko; Russia	Leonardo Affede; Italy
Individual foil	Maximilien Chastanet; France	Aleksandr Pivovarov; Russia	Martino Minuto; Turkey
Individual foil	Maximilien Chastanet; France	Aleksandr Pivovarov; Russia	Kwak Jun-hyuk; South Korea
Team épée	France (FRA); Alex Fava; Erwan Fonson; Virgile Marchal; Yannick Borel	Ukraine (UKR); Valeriy Zharskyy; Volodymyr Stankevych; Yan Sych; Yuriy Taranenko	Italy (ITA); Andrea Baroglio; Lorenzo Bruttini; Lorenzo Buzzi; Luca Ferraris
Team sabre	France (FRA); Arthur Zatko; Fabien Ballorca; Maxence Lambert; Tom Seitz	Ukraine (UKR); Bohdan Platonov; Dmytro Raskosov; Yevhen Statsenko; Yuriy Tsap	South Korea (KOR); Chung Ho-jin; Kang Min-kyu; Park Jun-yeong; Song Jun-hun
Team foil	France (FRA); Baptiste Mourrain; Jean Paul Helissey; Maxime Pauty; Maximilien Chastanet	South Korea (KOR); Kwak Chang-woo; Kwak Jun-hyuk; Park Jun-young; Song Jae-kwan	Italy (ITA); Alessandro Paroli; Francesco Trani; Saverio Schiavone; Tobia Biondo

=== Women's events ===
Event	Gold	Silver	Bronze
Individual épée	Dimodi Laurence Épée; France	Viktoriia Kuzmenkova; Russia	Iuliia Lichagina; Russia
Individual épée	Dimodi Laurence Épée; France	Viktoriia Kuzmenkova; Russia	Nelli Paju; Estonia
Individual sabre	Anna Bashta; Russia	Kim Seon-hee; South Korea	Adrienne Jarocki; United States
Individual sabre	Anna Bashta; Russia	Kim Seon-hee; South Korea	Marta Wiktoria Puda; Poland
Individual foil	Jéromine Mpah Njanga; France	Svetlana Tripapina; Russia	Kristina Novalinska; Russia
Individual foil	Jéromine Mpah Njanga; France	Svetlana Tripapina; Russia	Hong Hyo-jin; South Korea
Team épée	France (FRA); Amélie Awong Mvele; Joséphine Coquin; Dimodi Laurence Épée; Hélène Ngom	Russia (RUS); Alena Komarova; Elena Shasharina; Iuliia Lichagina; Viktoriia Kuzmenkova	United States (USA); Amanda Sirico; Danielle Henderson; Nina Van Loon; Jessie Radanovich
Team sabre	South Korea (KOR); Choi Shin-hui; Choi Soo-yeon; Kim Ha-eun; Kim Seon-hee	Russia (RUS); Aleksandra Shatalova; Anna Bashta; Evgeniia Karbolina; Alina Meshcheriakova	France (FRA); Béline Boulay; Marion Stoltz; Sara Balzer; Mathilda Agralissoum
Team foil	Italy (ITA); Beatrice Monaco; Camilla Mancini; Francesca Palumbo; Olga Rachele Calissi	France (FRA); Flora Tran; Jéromine Mpah Njanga; Julie Huin; Maeva Rancurel	Russia (RUS); Kristina Novalinska; Leyla Pirieva; Oxana Pogrebnyak; Svetlana Tripapina
