= Che Xiaoxi =

Chinese table tennis player

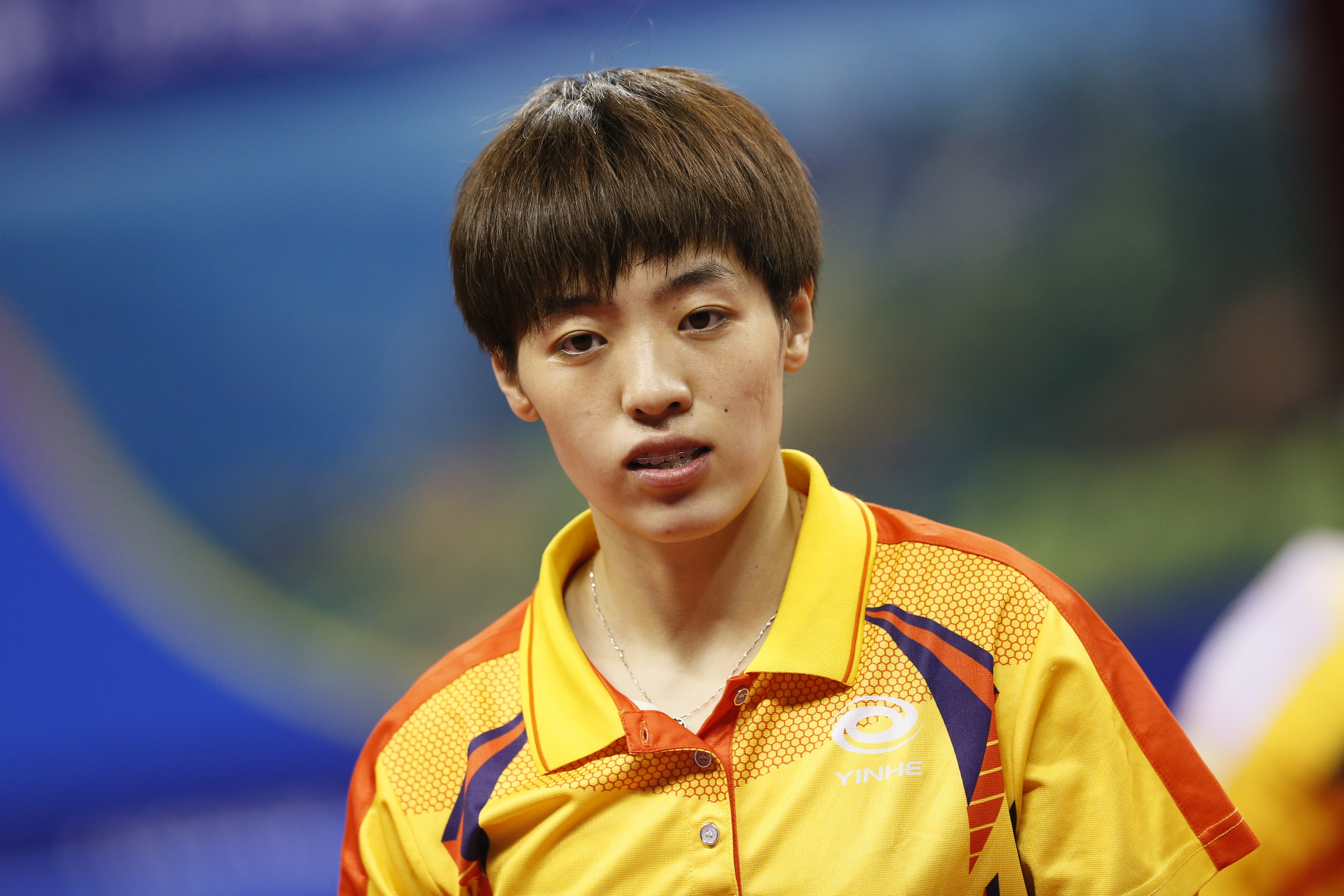
- Che at the 2016 All China Table Tennis Championships

Personal information
- Born: 3 March 1993 (age 33) Daqing, Heilongjiang, China

Sport
- Sport: Table tennis
- Playing style: Right-handed shakehand grip
- Highest ranking: 44 (August 2015)
Medal record
Representing China
Universiade
| Gold medal – first place | 2013 Kazan | Women's singles |
| Gold medal – first place | 2015 Gwangju | Women's singles |
| Gold medal – first place | 2015 Gwangju | Women's doubles |
| Gold medal – first place | 2015 Gwangju | Women's team |
| Silver medal – second place | 2013 Kazan | Women's doubles |
| Bronze medal – third place | 2013 Kazan | Women's team |

Che Xiaoxi
- Traditional Chinese: 車曉曦
- Simplified Chinese: 车晓曦
Transcriptions
Standard Mandarin
- Hanyu Pinyin: Chē Xiǎoxī

Che Xiaoxi (Chinese: 车晓曦, born 3 March 1993) is a Chinese table tennis player. She won the women's singles title at both the 2013 and 2015 Summer Universiade.

== Achievements ==
=== ITTF Tours ===
Women's doubles

| Year | Tournament | Level | Partner | Final opponents | Score | Rank |
|---|---|---|---|---|---|---|
| 2019 | Canada Open | Challenge | Li Jiayi | Honoka Hashimoto; Hitomi Sato | 0–3 | 2nd place, silver medalist(s) |
