= Diving at the 2015 Summer Universiade =

Diving at the XXVIII Summer Universiade
- Venue: Nambu University International Aquatics Center
- Dates: July 3, 2015 – July 9, 2015

Diving was contested at the 2015 Summer Universiade from July 3 to 9 at the Nambu University International Aquatics Center in Gwangju, South Korea.

== Medal summary ==
=== Medal table ===
* Host nation (South Korea)

Rank	Nation	Gold	Silver	Bronze	Total
1	China	10	4	3	17
2	Russia	2	3	2	7
3	Canada	1	0	1	2
4	South Korea*	0	6	3	9
5	United States	0	0	2	2
6	Japan	0	0	1	1
6	Mexico	0	0	1	1
Totals (7 entries)		13	13	13	39

=== Men's events ===
Event	Gold	Silver	Bronze
1 metre springboard	Peng Jianfeng; China	Zhang Xinghao; China	Briadam Herrera; United States
3 metre springboard	Peng Jianfeng; China	Evgenii Novoselov; Russia	Daniel Islas Arroyo; Mexico
10 metre platform	Wang Yao; China	Igor Mialin; Russia	Wang Anqi; China
Synchronized 3 metre springboard	Russia (RUS); Evgenii Novoselov; Viacheslav Novoselov	China (CHN); Li Yanan; Zhong Yuming	South Korea (KOR); Kim Jin-yong; Son Tae-lang
Synchronized 10 metre platform	China (CHN); Wang Anqi; Wang Yao	South Korea (KOR); Kim Jin-yong; Kim Yeong-nam	Russia (RUS); Egor Galperin; Igor Mialin
Team	China (CHN)	Russia (RUS)	South Korea (KOR)

=== Women's events ===
Event	Gold	Silver	Bronze
1 metre springboard	Zheng Shuangxue; China	Kim Na-mi; South Korea	Sun Mengchen; China
3 metre springboard	Zheng Shuangxue; China	Liu Tian; China	Kim Na-mi; South Korea
10 metre platform	Wang Ying; China	Wang Han; China	Mai Nakagawa; Japan
Synchronized 3 metre springboard	China (CHN); Qu Lin; Sun Mengchen	South Korea (KOR); Kim Na-mi; Moon Na-yun	United States (USA); Haley Allen; Olivia Rosendahl
Synchronized 10 metre platform	Canada (CAN); Carol-Ann Ware; Celina Jayne Toth	South Korea (KOR); Ko Eun-ji; Moon Na-yun	China (CHN); Wang Han; Wang Ying
Team	China (CHN)	South Korea (KOR)	Russia (RUS)

=== Mixed ===
Event	Gold	Silver	Bronze
Mixed team	Russia (RUS); Daria Govor; Igor Mialin	South Korea (KOR); Kim Yeong-nam; Kim Na-mi	Canada (CAN); Celina Jayne Toth; Cameron Reid Mclean
