= Table tennis at the 2015 Summer Universiade =

Table tennis at the XXVIII Summer Universiade
- Venue: Jangseong Hong Gil-Dong Gymnasium
- Dates: July 6, 2015 – July 13, 2015

Table tennis was contested at the 2015 Summer Universiade from July 6 to 13 at the Jangseong Hong Gil-Dong Gymnasium in Jangseong, South Korea. Men's and women's singles, men's and women's team, and men's, women's, and mixed doubles events was contested.

== Medal summary ==
=== Medal table ===
Rank	Nation	Gold	Silver	Bronze	Total
1	China (CHN)	4	1	2	7
2	Chinese Taipei (TPE)	1	3	2	6
2	Japan (JPN)	1	3	2	6
4	South Korea (KOR)	1	0	5	6
5	France (FRA)	0	0	1	1
5	Romania (ROM)	0	0	1	1
5	Russia (RUS)	0	0	1	1
Totals (7 entries)		7	7	14	28

=== Events ===
Event	Gold	Silver	Bronze
Men's singles	Japan (JPN); Masataka Morizono	Japan (JPN); Yuya Oshima	South Korea (KOR); Lee Sang-su
Men's singles	Japan (JPN); Masataka Morizono	Japan (JPN); Yuya Oshima	China (CHN); Liu Yi
Women's singles	China (CHN); Che Xiaoxi	China (CHN); Jiang Yue	Romania (ROU); Bernadette Szőcs
Women's singles	China (CHN); Che Xiaoxi	China (CHN); Jiang Yue	South Korea (KOR); Yang Ha-eun
Men's doubles	Chinese Taipei (TPE); Chiang Hung-chieh; Huang Sheng-sheng	Japan (JPN); Masataka Morizono; Yuya Oshima	China (CHN); Chen Xin; Liu Yi
Men's doubles	Chinese Taipei (TPE); Chiang Hung-chieh; Huang Sheng-sheng	Japan (JPN); Masataka Morizono; Yuya Oshima	South Korea (KOR); Jung Young-sik; Kim Min-seok
Women's doubles	China (CHN); Che Xiaoxi; Jiang Yue	Chinese Taipei (TPE); Cheng I-ching; Lee I-chen	South Korea (KOR); Jeon Ji-hee; Yang Ha-eun
Women's doubles	China (CHN); Che Xiaoxi; Jiang Yue	Chinese Taipei (TPE); Cheng I-ching; Lee I-chen	Japan (JPN); Eriko Kitaoka; Yuki Shoji
Mixed doubles	South Korea (KOR); Kim Min-seok; Jeon Ji-hee	Chinese Taipei (TPE); Chiang Hung-chieh; Chen Szu-yu	Chinese Taipei (TPE); Chen Chien-an; Cheng I-ching
Mixed doubles	South Korea (KOR); Kim Min-seok; Jeon Ji-hee	Chinese Taipei (TPE); Chiang Hung-chieh; Chen Szu-yu	Russia (RUS); Taras Merzlikin; Yana Noskova
Men's team	China (CHN); Liu Yi; Jiaxin Lai; Lyu Xiang; Fang Yinchi; Chen Xin	Japan (JPN); Asuka Machi; Jin Ueda; Masataka Morizono; Yuya Oshima; Masaki Yoshida	Chinese Taipei (TPE); Chen Chien-an; Huang Sheng-sheng; Liao Cheng-ting; Chiang Hung-chieh; Yang Heng-wei
Men's team	China (CHN); Liu Yi; Jiaxin Lai; Lyu Xiang; Fang Yinchi; Chen Xin	Japan (JPN); Asuka Machi; Jin Ueda; Masataka Morizono; Yuya Oshima; Masaki Yoshida	France (FRA); Benjamin Brossier; Romain Lorentz; Tristan Flore; Quentin Robinot
Women's team	China (CHN); Che Xiaoxi; Guo Yichen; Jiang Yue; Ma Yuofei; Zheng Shichang	Chinese Taipei (TPE); Chen Szu-yu; Cheng Hsien-tzu; Cheng I-ching; Lee I-Chen; Lin Chia-hui	Japan (JPN); Eriko Kitaoka; Misako Niwa; Rei Yamamoto; Rika Suzuki; Yuki Shoja
Women's team	China (CHN); Che Xiaoxi; Guo Yichen; Jiang Yue; Ma Yuofei; Zheng Shichang	Chinese Taipei (TPE); Chen Szu-yu; Cheng Hsien-tzu; Cheng I-ching; Lee I-Chen; Lin Chia-hui	South Korea (KOR); Hwang Jina; Jeon Ji-hee; Lee Soo-bong; Lee Yeongeun; Yang Ha-eun
