= Kim Kuk-hyang =

Kim Kuk-hyang is a Korean name and may refer to:

- Kim Kuk-hyang (diver), North Korean diver
- Kim Kuk-hyang (weightlifter), North Korean weightlifter
