= Romania at the 2015 Summer Universiade =

- IOC code: ROU

in Gwangju, South Korea 3 – 14 July 2015
- Competitors: 58 in 6 sports
- Officials: 12
- Medals Ranked 29th: Gold 1 Silver 3 Bronze 3 Total 7

Summer Universiade appearances
- 1959; 1961; 1963; 1965; 1967; 1970; 1973; 1975; 1977; 1979; 1981; 1983; 1985; 1987; 1989; 1991; 1993; 1995; 1997; 1999; 2001; 2003; 2005; 2007; 2009; 2011; 2013; 2015; 2017; 2019; 2021; 2025; 2027

Romania competed at the 2015 Summer Universiade in Gwangju, South Korea.

== Medal by sports ==
Medals by sport
Sport	1st place, gold medalist(s)	2nd place, silver medalist(s)	3rd place, bronze medalist(s)	Total
Athletics	0	2	0	2
Judo	0	1	2	3
Shooting	1	0	0	1
Table tennis	0	0	1	1
Total	1	3	3	7

== Medalists ==
Medal	Name	Sport	Event	Date
Gold	Laura Ilie	Shooting	Women's 50 m rifle 3 positions	9 July
Silver	Larisa Florian	Judo	Women's -52 kg	6 July
Silver	Andrei Gag	Athletics	Men's shot put	8 July
Silver	Nicolae Soare	Athletics	Men's 10,000 m	9 July
Bronze	Vlăduț Simionescu	Judo	Men's open weight	4 July
Bronze	Vlăduț Simionescu	Judo	Men's +100 kg	7 July
Bronze	Bernadette Szőcs	Table tennis	Women's Singles	13 July

== Handball ==
Romania participated with a team composed of: Elena Șerban, Ana Maria Măzărean, Cristian Enache (goalkeepers), Ana Maria Apipie, Alexandra Maria Gavrilă, Maria Mădălina Zamfirescu, Cosmina Lia Cozma, Andreea Trăilă Mihăilă, Elena Cristina Florică, Roxana Diana Cîrjan, Maria Cristina Nan, Laura Petruța Popa, Georgiana Cătălina Preda, Dana Laura Leahu, Bianca Elena Tiron, Carmen Gabriela Șelaru-Ilie.

== Judo ==
=== Men ===
Athlete	Event	Round of 16	Round of 8	Quarterfinals	Semifinals	Repechage Round 1	Repechage Round 2	Final of Repechage	Bronze Medal Contest	Final	
Athlete	Event	Opposition Result	Opposition Result	Opposition Result	Opposition Result	Opposition Result	Opposition Result	Opposition Result	Opposition Result	Opposition Result	Rank
Remus Lazea	66 kg										
Denis Mititelu	81 kg	(Kazakhstan) Zakariyayev; W 100S1-010S1	(Lithuania) Varnas; W 001S3-000S2	(Japan) Khalmurzaev; L 000S2-101	Did not advance	BYE	(Germany) Münich; W 000-110	(Belgium) Bottieau; W 100-000S2	(France) Allardon; L 001-100S1	Did not advance	5
Eduard Nicolaescu	73 kg										
Emanuel Rădulescu	90 kg										
Vlăduț Simionescu	100 kg	—	(Chinese Taipei) Lee; W 100-000S4	(Estonia) Mettis; W 100S2-001S1	(Japan) Harasawa; L 000S2-010S1	—			(Kazakhstan) Yergaliyev; W 000S1-101	Did not advance	3rd place, bronze medalist(s)

=== Women ===
Athlete	Event	Round of 16	Round of 8	Quarterfinals	Semifinals	Repechage Round 1	Repechage Round 2	Final of Repechage	Bronze Medal Contest	Final	
Athlete	Event	Opposition Result	Opposition Result	Opposition Result	Opposition Result	Opposition Result	Opposition Result	Opposition Result	Opposition Result	Opposition Result	Rank
Renata Bucătari	63 kg	(Ukraine) Andriievska; W 100-000	(Russia) Surakatova; L 000-100	Did not advance							
Alexandra Florian	52 kg										
Loredana Ohâi	57 kg										
Lorena Podelenczki	70 kg	(Lebanon) Aad; W 100S1-000	(Japan) Osanai; W 100-000S2	Did not advance		BYE	(Italy) Ferrari; L 000S2-0100	Did not advance			
Andreea Ștefănescu	48 kg										

== Shooting ==
Men

Athlete	Event	Qualification		Final	
Athlete	Event	Points	Rank	Points	Rank
Ștefan Rareș Ion					
Vlad Paul Săcăleanu					
Alexandru Ștefan Saucă					

Women

Athlete	Event	Qualification		Final	
Athlete	Event	Points	Rank	Points	Rank
Laura Georgeta Ilie					
Ioana Georgiana Cristea					
Eliza Alexandra Molnar					
