= Swimming at the 2014 European Aquatics Championships – Men's 400 metre freestyle =

Men's 400 metre freestyle at the Swimming at the 2014 European Aquatics Championships
- Dates: 18 August
- Competitors: 52 from 25 nations
- Winning time: 3:45.66

Medalists
gold medal	Velimir Stjepanović	Serbia
silver medal	Andrea D'Arrigo	Italy
bronze medal	Jay Lelliott	Great Britain

The Men's 400 metre freestyle competition of the 2014 European Aquatics Championships was held on 18 August.

== Records ==
Prior to the competition, the existing world, European and championship records were as follows.

	Name	Nation	Time	Location	Date
World record	Paul Biedermann	Germany	3:40.07	Rome	28 July 2009
European record	Paul Biedermann	Germany	3:40.07	Rome	28 July 2009
Championship record	Yury Prilukov	Russia	3:45.10	Eindhoven	18 March 2008

== Results ==
=== Heats ===
The heats were held at 09:30.

Rank	Heat	Lane	Name	Nationality	Time	Notes
1	6	4	Stephen Milne	Great Britain	3:48.62	Q
2	6	6	Andrea D'Arrigo	Italy	3:48.77	Q
3	6	5	Gabriele Detti	Italy	3:48.79	Q
4	6	1	Clemens Rapp	Germany	3:49.03	Q
5	6	3	Jan Micka	Czech Republic	3:49.10	Q
6	5	5	Velimir Stjepanović	Serbia	3:49.49	Q
7	6	2	Jay Lelliott	Great Britain	3:49.82	Q
8	5	1	Gergő Kis	Hungary	3:50.35	Q
9	5	4	Paul Biedermann	Germany	3:50.42	
10	4	5	Anders Lie	Denmark	3:50.62	
11	5	2	Yannick Agnel	France	3:50.81	
12	5	0	Matias Koski	Finland	3:50.84	
13	6	8	Florian Vogel	Germany	3:50.92	
14	5	3	Ferry Weertmann	Netherlands	3:51.05	
15	6	9	David Brandl	Austria	3:51.09	
16	6	7	Filip Zaborowski	Poland	3:51.40	
17	5	8	Mads Glæsner	Denmark	3:51.42	
18	6	0	Miguel Durán	Spain	3:51.57	
19	3	4	Alexander Krasnykh	Russia	3:51.62	
20	4	1	Joris Bouchaut	France	3:52.22	
21	4	7	Anton Ipsen	Denmark	3:52.66	
22	5	6	Samuel Pizzetti	Italy	3:52.83	
23	4	3	Serhiy Frolov	Ukraine	3:52.89	
24	2	5	Martin Bau	Slovenia	3:52.96	
25	4	0	Richárd Nagy	Slovakia	3:53.39	
26	3	2	Maarten Brzoskowski	Netherlands	3:53.44	
27	4	6	Anthony Pannier	France	3:53.45	
28	1	4	Jean-Baptiste Febo	Switzerland	3:53.54	
29	4	4	Marc Sánchez	Spain	3:53.71	
30	5	9	Dmitry Ermakov	Russia	3:54.15	
31	5	7	Max Litchfield	Great Britain	3:54.18	
32	4	9	Lander Hendrickx	Belgium	3:54.67	
33	3	3	Felix Auböck	Austria	3:54.94	
34	3	5	Nezir Karap	Turkey	3:55.00	
35	3	7	Stefan Šorak	Serbia	3:55.15	
36	4	2	Damien Joly	France	3:55.48	
37	4	8	Pawel Furtek	Poland	3:55.65	
38	3	0	Anton Goncharov	Ukraine	3:56.18	
39	3	8	Adam Paulsson	Sweden	3:56.22	
40	2	3	David Kunčar	Czech Republic	3:56.51	
41	1	3	Ensar Hajder	Bosnia and Herzegovina	3:57.60	
42	3	9	Eetu Piiroinen	Finland	3:58.07	
43	2	6	Alexander Kudashev	Russia	3:58.20	
44	2	7	Irakli Revishvili	Georgia	3:58.45	
45	3	6	Ediz Yıldırımer	Turkey	3:59.02	
46	2	8	Maksym Shemberev	Ukraine	3:59.44	
47	2	4	Jan Kutník	Czech Republic	4:00.37	
48	2	0	Pit Brandenburger	Luxembourg	4:00.99	
49	2	2	Tomás Novovesky	Czech Republic	4:01.33	
50	3	1	Uladzimir Zhyharau	Belarus	4:02.14	
51	2	1	David Karasek	Switzerland	4:03.20	
52	1	5	Davit Sikharulidze	Georgia	4:10.76	

=== Final ===
The final was held at 18:07.

Rank	Lane	Name	Nationality	Time	Notes
1st place, gold medalist(s)	7	Velimir Stjepanović	Serbia	3:45.66	NR
2nd place, silver medalist(s)	5	Andrea D'Arrigo	Italy	3:46.91	
3rd place, bronze medalist(s)	1	Jay Lelliott	Great Britain	3:47.50	
4	3	Gabriele Detti	Italy	3:48.10	
5	6	Clemens Rapp	Germany	3:48.44	
6	4	Stephen Milne	Great Britain	3:48.55	
7	2	Jan Micka	Czech Republic	3:48.57	
8	8	Gergő Kis	Hungary	3:53.14	
