= Junya Hasegawa =

Japanese swimmer (born 1993)

Personal information
- Nationality: Japanese
- Born: 13 December 1993 (age 32) Shimada, Shizuoka, Japan

Sport
- Sport: Swimming
- Strokes: backstroke
Medal record
Representing Japan
Summer Universiade
Gold medal – first place	2015 Gwangju	50m backstroke
Gold medal – first place	2015 Gwangju	100m backstroke
Bronze medal – third place	2015 Gwangju	4x100m medley relay

Junya Hasegawa (長谷川 純矢, Hasegawa Jun'ya; born 13 December 1993) is a Japanese swimmer. He competed in the men's 100 metre backstroke event at the 2016 Summer Olympics.
