= Jay Lelliott =

English swimmer

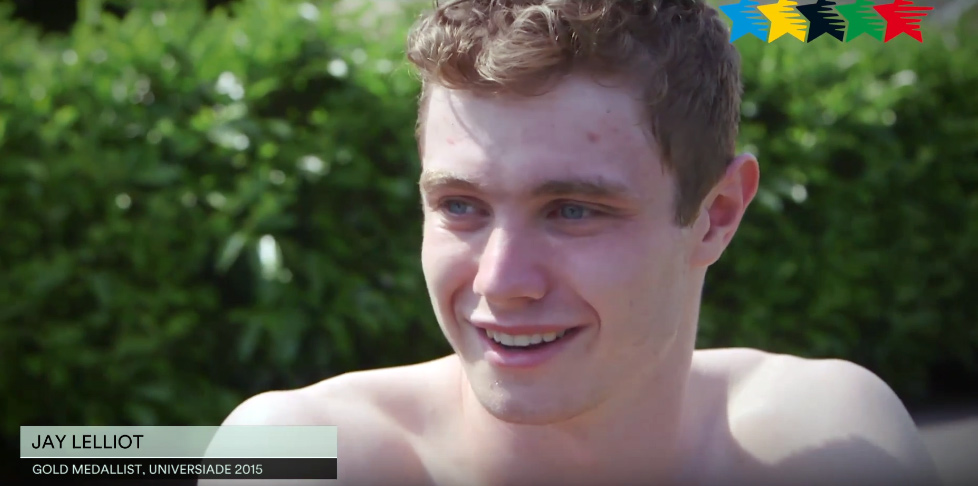
- Jay Lelliott

Personal information
- Born: 1 February 1995 (age 31) Dorchester, England

Sport
- Sport: Swimming
Medal record
Representing United Kingdom
European Championships (LC)
Bronze medal – third place	2014 Berlin	400 m freestyle
Summer Universiade
Gold medal – first place	2015 Gwangju	400 m freestyle
Silver medal – second place	2015 Gwangju	800 m freestyle
Silver medal – second place	2017 Taipei	400 m freestyle

Jay Lelliott (born 1 February 1995) is an English freestyle swimmer who won a bronze medal in the 400 m event at the 2014 European Aquatics Championships.

Lelliott started swimming competitively aged 11, inspired by Michael Phelps. In 2007 and 2008 he underwent surgical operations due to a brain tumour. He was part of the 2012 Summer Olympics torch relay.
