= Mitch D'Arrigo =

Italian-American swimmer (born 1995)

Personal information
- Full name: Andrea Mitchell D'Arrigo
- National team: Italy; United States
- Born: 28 April 1995 (age 31) Rome, Italy
- Height: 1.94 m (6 ft 4 in)
- Weight: 85 kg (187 lb)
- Website: www.mitchdarrigo.com

Sport
- Sport: Swimming
- Club: Aurelia Nuoto Unicusano; Gator Swim Club
- College team: University of Florida
Medal record
Men's swimming
Representing Italy
World Championships (SC)
Silver medal – second place	2014 Doha	4×200 m freestyle
European Championships (LC)
Silver medal – second place	2014 Berlin	400 m freestyle
Bronze medal – third place	2016 London	4×200 m freestyle
European Championships (SC)
Silver medal – second place	2013 Herning	400 m freestyle
Bronze medal – third place	2012 Chartres	400 m freestyle
Representing the United States
World University Games
Silver medal – second place	2017 Taipei	4×200 m freestyle

Andrea Mitchell "Mitch" D'Arrigo (born 28 April 1995), is a freestyle swimmer who has competed internationally for Italy and for the United States. He specializes in the men's 400 metre freestyle event, where he won two silver medals and one bronze medal representing Italy at the European Championships. He also earned silver and bronze medals for Italy in the men's 4×200 metre freestyle relay events at the World and European Championships.

D'Arrigo competed for Italy at the 2016 Summer Olympics in the men's 200 metre freestyle and men's 4×200 metre freestyle relay.

He also competed for the United States at the 2017 World University Games, winning a silver medal in the men's 4×200 m freestyle relay.

D'Arrigo was born in Rome, Italy, and moved to Gainesville, Florida, where he attended P. K. Yonge Developmental Research School as a high school senior. He joined the University of Florida team in 2013. D'Arrigo has dual citizenship; his father is Italian and his mother is American.
