= Swimming at the 2015 Summer Universiade =

Swimming at the XXVIII Summer Universiade
- Venues: Nambu University International Aquatics Center
- Dates: July 4, 2015 – July 11, 2015

Swimming was contested at the 2015 Summer Universiade from July 4 to 11 in Gwangju, South Korea. The swimming competitions were held at the Nambu University International Aquatics Center.

== Medal summary ==
=== Medal table ===
* Host nation (South Korea)

Rank	Nation	Gold	Silver	Bronze	Total
1	United States	15	10	9	34
2	Japan	5	7	9	21
3	Russia	5	2	4	11
4	China	4	2	0	6
5	Italy	3	9	6	18
6	Australia	2	2	7	11
7	Brazil	2	1	0	3
7	Ukraine	2	1	0	3
9	Great Britain	1	2	2	5
10	Belarus	1	1	1	3
11	Kazakhstan	1	0	1	2
12	Canada	1	0	0	1
12	Serbia	1	0	0	1
14	Czech Republic	0	2	1	3
15	Ireland	0	1	1	2
16	Hong Kong	0	1	0	1
16	South Korea*	0	1	0	1
18	Slovakia	0	0	1	1
Totals (18 entries)		43	42	42	127

=== Men's events ===
Event	Gold		Silver		Bronze	
50 m freestyle	Yauhen Tsurkin; Belarus	22.22	Henrique Martins; Brazil	22.24	Paul Powers; United States	22.34
100 m freestyle	Henrique Martins; Brazil	48.98	Jack Conger; United States	49.02	Marco Belotti; Italy	49.43
200 m freestyle	Reed Malone; United States	1:47.15	Clay Youngquist; United States	1:47.91	Jacob Hansford; Australia	1:48.29
400 m freestyle	Jay Lelliott; Great Britain	3:48.84	Jack McLoughlin; Australia	3:48.88	Reed Malone; United States	3:50.13
800 m freestyle	Serhiy Frolov; Ukraine	7:50.28	Jay Lelliott; Great Britain	7:50.97	Ayatsugu Hirai; Japan	7:52.77
1500 m freestyle	Ayatsugu Hirai; Japan	14:56.10	Serhiy Frolov; Ukraine	15:02.81	Kohei Yamamoto; Japan	15:03.99
50 m backstroke	Junya Hasegawa; Japan	25.25	Stefano Pizzamiglio; Italy	25.43	Nikita Ulyanov; Russia	25.49
100 m backstroke	Junya Hasegawa; Japan	53.77	Christopher Ciccarese; Italy	53.92	Jack Conger; United States	54.09
200 m backstroke	Jacob Pebley; United States	1:56.29	Keita Sunama; Japan	1:57.50	Andrey Shabasov; Russia	1:57.68
50 m breaststroke	Čaba Silađi; Serbia	27.34	Andrea Toniato; Italy	27.41	Dmitriy Balandin; Kazakhstan	27.47
100 m breaststroke	Dmitriy Balandin; Kazakhstan	59.96	James Wilby; Great Britain	1:00.28	Craig Benson; Great Britain	1:00.33
200 m breaststroke	Josh Prenot; United States	2:08.90	Kazuki Kohinata; Japan	2:09.08	Craig Benson; Great Britain	2:09.10
50 m butterfly	Henrique Martins; Brazil	23.22	Yauhen Tsurkin; Belarus	23.44	Piero Codia; Italy	23.48
100 m butterfly	Evgeny Koptelov; Russia	51.50	Piero Codia; Italy	51.69	Yauhen Tsurkin; Belarus	52.12
200 m butterfly	Evgeny Koptelov; Russia	1:54.79	Yuya Yajima; Japan	1:55.73	Masayuki Umemoto; Japan	1:56.12
200 m individual medley	Justin James; Australia Josh Prenot; United States	1:58.38	None awarded		Keita Sunama; Japan	1:58.45
400 m individual medley	Jay Litherland; United States	4:12.43	Josh Prenot; United States	4:13.15	Keita Sunama; Japan	4:13.98
4 × 100 m freestyle relay	United States (USA); Matthew Ellis (49.86); Michael Wynalda (49.38); Jack Conger (47.75); Seth Stubblefield (48.86); Paul Powers^{[a]} Clay Youngquist^{[a]} John Murray^{[a]}	3:15.85	Japan (JPN); Reo Sakata (50.06); Kosuke Matsui (49.75); Takumi Komatsu (49.49); Toru Maruyama (48.68)	3:17.98	Russia (RUS); Ivan Kuzmenko (50.22); Oleg Tikhobaev (49.55); Alexander Tikhonov (50.17); Mikhail Polishchuk (48.24); Dmitrii Ermakov^{[a]}	3:18.18
4 × 200 m freestyle relay	United States (USA); Clay Youngquist (1:49.03); Reed Malone (1:47.06); Michael Wynalda (1:47.25); Kyle Whitaker (1:47.48); Andrew Cosgarea^{[a]} Andrew Seliskar^{[a]} John Lewis^{[a]}	7:10.82	Australia (AUS); Jacob Hansford (1:48.13); Travis Mahoney (1:48.05); Jack McLoughlin (1:48.42); Justin James (1:48.44); Jared Gilliland^{[a]} Nicholas Brown^{[a]}	7:13.04	Japan (JPN); Naito Ehara (1:48.95); Reo Sakata (1:47.60); Katsuhiro Matsumoto (1:48.15); Takumi Komatsu (1:48.42)	7:13.12
4 × 100 m medley relay	Russia (RUS); Andrey Shabasov (54.74); Oleg Kostin (1:00.26); Evgeny Koptelov (51.03); Mikhail Polishchuk (48.53); Nikita Ulyanov^{[a]} Kirill Prigoda^{[a]} Aleksandr Sadovnikov^{[a]} Oleg Tikhobaev^{[a]}	3:34.56	United States (USA); Jacob Pebley (54.42); Daniel MacDonald (1:00.73); Matthew Josa (51.51); Jack Conger (47.95); Carsten Vissering^{[a]} Matthew Ellis^{[a]} Michael Wynalda^{[a]}	3:34.61	Japan (JPN); Junya Hasegawa (54.18); Kazuki Kohinata (1:00.21); Masayuki Umemoto (51.48); Toru Maruyama (48.95)	3:34.82
10 km marathon	Anton Evsikov; Russia	1:55:09.6	Matteo Furlan; Italy	1:55:09.9	Mario Sanzullo; Italy	1:55:11.0

^{a} Swimmers who participated in the heats only and received medals.

=== Women's events ===
Event	Gold		Silver		Bronze	
50 m freestyle	Rozaliya Nasretdinova; Russia	24.91	Elizaveta Bazarova; Russia	25.05	Holly Barratt; Australia	25.08
100 m freestyle	Shannon Vreeland; United States	54.39	Abbey Weitzeil; United States	54.53	Ami Matsuo; Australia	54.94
200 m freestyle	Shannon Vreeland; United States	1:58.38	Wang Shijia; China	1:58.89	Martina de Memme; Italy	1:59.14
400 m freestyle	Leah Smith; United States	4:05.29	Lindsay Vrooman; United States	4:07.28	Martina de Memme; Italy	4:08.95
800 m freestyle	Lindsay Vrooman; United States	8:26.67	Martina Rita Caramignoli; Italy	8:28.43	Kiah Melverton; Australia	8:31.80
1500 m freestyle	Martina Rita Caramignoli; Italy	16:06.71	Lindsay Vrooman; United States	16:13.85	Kiah Melverton; Australia	16:21.39
50 m backstroke	Holly Barratt; Australia	28.04	Stephanie Au; Hong Kong; Yu Hyoun-ji; South Korea	28.38	-	
100 m backstroke	Kylie Masse; Canada	59.97	Elizabeth Pelton; United States	1:00.65	Rachel Bootsma; United States	1:00.78
200 m backstroke	Lisa Bratton; United States	2:09.31	Simona Baumrtová; Czech Republic	2:10.53	Yuka Kawayoke; Japan	2:11.60
50 m breaststroke	Mariya Liver; Ukraine	30.73	Fiona Doyle; Ireland	31.09	Martina Carraro; Italy; Emma Reaney; United States	31.11
100 m breaststroke	Mina Matsushima; Japan	1:06.76	Lilly King; United States	1:06.93	Fiona Doyle; Ireland	1:07.15
200 m breaststroke	Keiko Fukudome; Japan	2:24.92	Reona Aoki; Japan	2:26.17	Martina Moravčíková; Czech Republic	2:27.35
50 m butterfly	Lu Ying; China	25.72 UR	Svetlana Chimrova; Russia	26.23	Holly Barratt; Australia	26.41
100 m butterfly	Lu Ying; China	57.83	Elena Di Liddo; Italy	58.29	Katarína Listopadová; Slovakia	58.37
200 m butterfly	Zhou Yilin; China	2:07.69	Alessia Polieri; Italy	2:08.66	Hali Flickinger; United States	2:08.80
200 m individual medley	Zhang Sishi; China	2:12.31	Madisyn Cox; United States	2:12.77	Ellen Fullerton; Australia	2:13.48
400 m individual medley	Sarah Henry; United States	4:38.88	Barbora Závadová; Czech Republic	4:40.03	Hali Flickinger; United States	4:40.54
4 × 100 m freestyle relay	United States (USA); Abbey Weitzeil; Shannon Vreeland; Madeline Locus; Lia Neal	3:38.12 UR	Japan (JPN); Yui Yamane; Yasuko Miyamoto; Aya Sato; Mari Sumiyoshi	3:41.15	Russia (RUS); Polina Lapshina; Margarita Nesterova; Elizaveta Bazarova; Rozaliya Nasretdinova	3:41.34
4 × 200 m freestyle relay	United States (USA); Chelsea Chenault; Hali Flickinger; Leah Smith; Shannon Vreeland	7:53.88 UR	China (CHN); Wang Shijia; Zhang Jiaqi; Zhou Yilin; Zhang Sishi	8:01.09	Japan (JPN); Aya Takano; Yui Yamane; Asami Chida; Yasuko Miyamoto	8:01.18
4 × 100 m medley relay	Italy (ITA); Carlotta Zofkova; Ilaria Scarcella; Elena Di Liddo; Laura Letrari	4:00.50	Japan (JPN); Miki Takahashi; Mina Matsushima; Rino Hosoda; Yui Yamane	4:00.61	United States (USA); Elizabeth Pelton; Lilly King; Felicia Lee; Shannon Vreeland	4:00.75
10 km marathon	Arianna Bridi; Italy	2:03:19.4	Ilaria Raimondi; Italy	2:03:58.9	Stephanie Peacock; United States	2:04:53.1
AF African record | AM Americas record | AS Asian record | CR Championship record | ER European record | OC Oceania record | WR World record | NR National record
