= Evgeny Koptelov =

Russian swimmer

Personal information
- National team: Russia
- Born: 24 November 1993 (age 32) Volgograd, Volgograd Oblast, Russia
- Height: 1.90 m (6 ft 3 in)
- Weight: 72 kg (159 lb; 11.3 st)

Sport
- Sport: Swimming
- Strokes: butterfly, medley
- Club: Volga Region Academy of Physical Culture, Sport and Tourism
Medal record
Representing Russia
Summer Universiade
Gold medal – first place	2013 Kazan	4×100 m medley
Gold medal – first place	2015 Gwangju	200 m butterfly
Gold medal – first place	2015 Gwangju	100 m butterfly
Gold medal – first place	2015 Gwangju	4x100 m medley
Bronze medal – third place	2013 Kazan	100 m butterfly

Evgeny Koptelov (Russian: Евгений Коптелов), (born 24 November 1993 in Volgograd, Volgograd Oblast, Russia) is a Russian swimmer. He won two gold medals at the 2015 Summer Universiade in 100m and 200m butterfly.

== Career ==
In 2012, Koptelov competed at the 2012 FINA World Swimming Championships (25 m) in Istanbul, Turkey making it to the semi-finals in men's 50 m butterfly. At the 2013 Summer Universiade in Kazan, Koptelov was member of the Russian Team that won gold in men's 4 × 100 m medley (with Vladimir Morozov, Kiril Strelnikov and Andrey Grechin) and a bronze medal in 100 m butterfly. In 2014, Koptelov finished 8th in 200 m butterfly at the 2014 European Championships.

In 2015, at the 2015 Summer Universiade in Gwangju, Koptelov won gold in 200 m butterfly clocking in 1:54.79 and in 100 m butterfly clocking a final time of 51.50 to win his second gold medal. He won his third gold with the Russian team in men's 4 × 100 m medley.
