= France at the 2015 Summer Universiade =

- IOC code: FRA
- NOC: French National Olympic and Sports Committee
- Website: http://www.franceolympique.com/

in Gwangju, South Korea 3 – 14 July 2015
- Competitors: 224 in 16 sports
- Medals Ranked 6th: Gold 13 Silver 9 Bronze 8 Total 30

Summer Universiade appearances
- 1959; 1961; 1963; 1965; 1967; 1970; 1973; 1975; 1977; 1979; 1981; 1983; 1985; 1987; 1989; 1991; 1993; 1995; 1997; 1999; 2001; 2003; 2005; 2007; 2009; 2011; 2013; 2015; 2017; 2019; 2021; 2025; 2027

France participated at the 2015 Summer Universiade in Gwangju, South Korea.

== Medal summary ==
=== Medal by sports ===
Medals by sport
Sport	1st place, gold medalist(s)	2nd place, silver medalist(s)	3rd place, bronze medalist(s)	Total
Athletics	0	1	0	1
Fencing	8	2	1	11
Judo	1	2	3	6
Football	1	0	0	1
Golf	0	2	0	2
Shooting	3	1	2	6
Table tennis	0	0	1	1
Taekwondo	0	1	0	1
Tennis	0	0	1	1
Total	13	9	8	30

=== Medalists ===
Medal	Name	Sport	Event	Date
Gold	Dimodi Laurence Épée	Fencing	Women's Epee Individual	4 July
Gold	Samah Hawa Camara	Judo	Women's -78 kg	4 July
Gold	Yannick Borel	Fencing	Men's Epee Individual	5 July
Gold	Jéromine Mpah Njanga	Fencing	Women's Foil Individual	5 July
Gold	Maximilien Chastanet	Fencing	Men's Foil Individual	6 July
Gold	Arthur Zatko; Fabien Ballorca; Maxence Lambert; Tom Seitz	Fencing	Men's Sabre Team	7 July
Gold	Amelie Awong Mvele; Josephine Coquin; Dimodi Laurence Épée; Helene Ngom	Fencing	Women's Epee Team	7 July
Gold	Alex Fava; Erwan Fonson; Virgile Marchal; Yannick Borel	Fencing	Men's Epee Team	8 July
Gold	Alexis Raynaud; Remi Moreno Flores; Etienne Germond	Shooting	Men's 50m Rifle Prone Team	8 July
Gold	Baptiste Mourrain; Jean Paul Helissey; Maxime Pauty; Maximilien Chastanet	Fencing	Men's Foil Team	9 July
Gold	Jean Quiquampoix	Shooting	Men's 25m Standard Pistol	9 July
Gold	Jean Quiquampoix; Florian Fouquet; Vincent Polo	Shooting	Men's 25m Standard Pistol Team	9 July
Gold	Amandine Guerin; Charlene Gorce; Laura Agard; Oceane Ollivier; Anne-sophie Ginestet; Aminata Diallo; Lea Rubio; Melissa Plaza; Clarisse Le Bihan; Solene Barbance; Lindsey Thomas; Laura Bourgoin; Marion Makuch; Ines Jaurena; Sophie Vaysse; Alizee Nadal; Rose Lavaud; Teninsoun Sissoko; Valérie Gauvin; Fanny Hoarau	Football	Women's Football	12 July
Silver	Clément Delvert	Judo	Men's -100 kg	4 July
Silver	Virgile Marchal	Fencing	Men's Epee Individual	5 July
Silver	Alexandre Mariac	Judo	Men's -66 kg	6 July
Silver	Flora Tran; Jéromine Mpah Njanga; Julie Huin; Maeva Rancurel	Fencing	Women's Foil Team	8 July
Silver	Bastien Auzeil	Athletics	Men's Decathlon	9 July
Silver	Alexis Raynaud; Etienne Germond; Brian Baudouin	Shooting	Men's 50m Rifle 3 Positions Team	10 July
Silver	Nicolas Platret	Golf	Men's Individual	11 July
Silver	Louis Cohen-boyer; Stanislas Gautier; Nicolas Platret	Golf	Men's Team	11 July
Silver	Torann Maizeroi	Taekwondo	Men's -74 kg lightweight	11 July
Bronze	Nabil Zalagh	Judo	Men's +100 kg Heavyweight	4 July
Bronze	Jonathan Allardon	Judo	Men's -81 kg Welterweight	5 July
Bronze	Margaux Pinot	Judo	Women's -70 kg Middleweight	5 July
Bronze	Jean Quiquampoix	Shooting	Men's 25m Rapid Fire Pistol	8 July
Bronze	Beline Boulay; Marion Stoltz; Sara Balzer; Mathilda Agralissoum	Fencing	Women's Sabre Team	9 July
Bronze	Benjamin Brossier; Romain Lorentz; Tristan Flore; Quentin Robinot	Table tennis	Men's Team	9 July
Bronze	Alexis Raynaud	Shooting	Men's 50m Rifle 3 Positions	10 July
Bronze	Lucas Poullain	Tennis	Men's Singles	11 July
