= Czech Republic at the 2015 Summer Universiade =

- IOC code: CZE
- NOC: Czech Olympic Committee

in Gwangju, South Korea 3 – 14 July 2015
- Competitors: 146 in 15 sports
- Medals Ranked 18th: Gold 3 Silver 3 Bronze 3 Total 9

Summer Universiade appearances (overview)
- 1993; 1995; 1997; 1999; 2001; 2003; 2005; 2007; 2009; 2011; 2013; 2015; 2017; 2019; 2021; 2025; 2027

Czech Republic participated at the 2015 Summer Universiade in Gwangju, South Korea.

== Medal summary ==
=== Medal by sports ===
Medals by sport
| Sport | 1st place, gold medalist(s) | 2nd place, silver medalist(s) | 3rd place, bronze medalist(s) | Total |
|---|---|---|---|---|
| Athletics | 1 | 0 | 2 | 3 |
| Swimming | 0 | 2 | 1 | 3 |
| Shooting | 2 | 1 | 0 | 3 |
| Total | 3 | 3 | 3 | 9 |

== Medalists ==
| Medal | Name | Sport | Event |
|---|---|---|---|
| Gold | Libuše Jahodová | Shooting | Women's skeet |
| Gold | Libuše Jahodová Jitka Pešková Barbora Šumová | Shooting | Women's skeet – teams |
| Gold | Kristiina Mäki | Athletics | Women's 5000 metres |
| Silver | Gabriela Vognarová | Shooting | Women's 10 metre air rifle |
| Silver | Simona Baumrtová | Swimming | Women's 200 m backstroke |
| Silver | Barbora Závadová | Swimming | Women's 400 m individual medley |
| Bronze | Jan Tesař | Athletics | Men's 400 metres |
| Bronze | Irena Šedivá | Athletics | Women's javelin throw |
| Bronze | Martina Moravčíková | Swimming | Women's 200 m breastroke |
