= Golf at the 2015 Summer Universiade =

Golf at the XXVIII Summer Universiade
- Venue: Naju Gold Lake Country Club
- Dates: 8 July 2015 – 11 July 2015

Golf was contested at the 2015 Summer Universiade from 8–11 July at the Naju Gold Lake Country Club in Naju, South Korea.

== Medal summary ==
| Event | Gold | Silver | Bronze |
|---|---|---|---|
| Men's individual | Kazuki Higa; Japan | Nicolas Platret; France | Natipong Srithong; Thailand |
| Men's team | Japan (JPN); Kazuki Higa; Kenta Konishi; Taihei Sato | France (FRA); Louis Cohen-Boyer; Stanislas Gautier; Nicolas Platret | South Korea (KOR); Jeong Yun-han; Kim Han-byeol; Yun Sung-ho |
| Women's individual | Lee Jeong-eun; South Korea | Shina Kanazawa; Japan | Sitanart Singhanart; Thailand |
| Women's team | South Korea (KOR); Jeong Ju-won; Kim Ah-in; Lee Jeong-eun | Japan (JPN); Riko Inoue; Shina Kanazawa; Nene Tanno | United States (USA); Lauren Kim; Hannah Kim; Eimi Koga |

== Medal table ==
* Host nation (South Korea)

| Rank | Nation | Gold | Silver | Bronze | Total |
|---|---|---|---|---|---|
| 1 | Japan (JPN) | 2 | 2 | 0 | 4 |
| 2 | South Korea (KOR)* | 2 | 0 | 1 | 3 |
| 3 | France (FRA) | 0 | 2 | 0 | 2 |
| 4 | Thailand (THA) | 0 | 0 | 2 | 2 |
| 5 | United States (USA) | 0 | 0 | 1 | 1 |
| Totals (5 entries) | | 4 | 4 | 4 | 12 |
