= Celina Toth =

Canadian diver (born 1992)

Personal information
- Full name: Celina Jayne Toth
- Born: March 20, 1992 (age 34) St. Thomas, Ontario, Canada
- Height: 163 cm (5 ft 4 in)
- Weight: 64 kg (141 lb)

Sport
- Country: Canada
- Sport: Diving
- Event: 10 m
Medal record
Women's diving
Representing Canada
Summer Universiade
Gold medal – first place	2015 Gwangju	10 m synchro
Silver medal – second place	2017 Taipei	Mixed team
Bronze medal – third place	2015 Gwangju	Mixed team
Bronze medal – third place	2017 Taipei	10m platform

Celina Jayne Toth (born March 20, 1992) is a Canadian diver in the platform (10 metre) events. Toth currently resides and trains in Victoria, British Columbia. Toth has been competing on the international stage since 2008.

== Career ==
Toth' first major team was at the 2018 Commonwealth Games, where she competed in the individual event. In February 2019, Toth won her first ever gold medal at the FINA Diving Grand Prix stop in Germany.

In July 2021, Toth won the individual 10 m platform competition at the Canadian Olympic trials. This qualified her to compete in the individual 10 m event in Tokyo.
