= Nabil Zalagh =

French judoka (born 1993)

Personal information
- Born: 13 February 1993 (age 33)
- Occupation: Judoka

Sport
- Country: France
- Sport: Judo
- Weight class: +100 kg
Medal record
Men's judo
Representing France
IJF Grand Prix
Bronze medal – third place	2016 Budapest	+100 kg
Bronze medal – third place	2018 Agadir	+100 kg
Summer Universiade
Bronze medal – third place	2015 Gwangju	+100 kg

Profile at external databases
- IJF: 3781
- JudoInside.com: 54652
- Updated on 5 December 2022

Nabil Zalagh (born 13 February 1993) is a French judoka.

Zalagh is a bronze medalist from the 2018 Judo Grand Prix Agadir in the +100 kg category.
