= Boltoboy Baltaev =

Uzbekistani judoka (born 1989)

Personal information
- Born: 2 October 1989 (age 36)
- Occupation: Judoka

Sport
- Country: Uzbekistan
- Sport: Judo
- Weight class: +100 kg
Medal record
Men's judo
Representing Uzbekistan
IJF Grand Prix
Silver medal – second place	2013 Tashkent	+100 kg
Bronze medal – third place	2013 Abu Dhabi	+100 kg
Bronze medal – third place	2016 Tashkent	+100 kg
Bronze medal – third place	2017 Tashkent	+100 kg

Profile at external databases
- IJF: 6997
- JudoInside.com: 76729
- Updated on 28 November 2021

Boltoboy Baltaev (born 2 October 1989) is an Uzbekistani judoka.

Baltaev is a bronze medallist from the 2017 Judo Grand Prix Tashkent in the +100 kg category.
