= Peng Jianfeng =

Chinese diver

Personal information
- Nationality: Chinese
- Born: 9 June 1994 (age 32)
- Height: 1.73 m (5 ft 8 in)

Sport
- Country: China
- Sport: Diving
- Event: 1 m
Medal record
World Championships
Gold medal – first place	2017 Budapest	1 m springboard
Gold medal – first place	2023 Fukuoka	1 m springboard
Bronze medal – third place	2019 Gwangju	1 m springboard
Summer Universiade
Gold medal – first place	2015 Gwangju	Team
Gold medal – first place	2015 Gwangju	1 m springboard
Gold medal – first place	2015 Gwangju	3 m springboard
Asian Games
Gold medal – first place	2018 Jakarta	1 m springboard

Peng Jianfeng (Chinese: 彭健烽; pinyin: Péng Jiànfēng; born 6 September 1994) is a Chinese diver.

He won the gold medal in the 1 metre springboard event in the 2017 World Aquatics Championships. Peng also participated at the 2019 World Aquatics Championships, winning a bronze medal.
