= Libuše Jahodová =

Czech sport shooter (born 1992)

Personal information
- Nationality: Czech
- Born: 31 May 1992 (age 32); Liberec, Czechoslovakia
- Height: 1.63 m (5 ft 4 in)
- Weight: 52 kg (115 lb)

Sport
- Country: Czech Republic
- Sport: Shooting

Libuše Jahodová (born 31 May 1992) is a Czech shooter. She represented her country at the 2016 Summer Olympics.
