= Daria Govor =

Russian diver

Personal information
- Born: 21 May 1995 (age 31) Elektrostal, Russia
Medal record
Women's diving
Representing Russia
European Championships
Gold medal – first place	2011 Turin	10 m platform synchro
Summer Universiade
Gold medal – first place	2015 Gwangju	Mixed team
Bronze medal – third place	2015 Gwangju	Team

Daria Govor (Russian: Дарья Говор; born 21 May 1995) is a Russian diver.

Govor began diving when she was 6 years old in Elektrostal and diving helped her to not be afraid of water. She won gold at the 2011 European Diving Championships in 10-meter synchronized diving, alongside Yulia Koltunova. Govor hoped to compete in the 2020 Summer Olympics. She was a team gold medalist at the 2015 Summer Universiade.
