= Australia at the 2015 Summer Universiade =

- IOC code: AUS
- NOC: Australian Olympic Committee
- Website: http://www.olympics.com.au/

in Gwangju, South Korea 3 – 14 July 2015
- Competitors: 180 in 15 sports
- Medals Ranked 15th: Gold 4 Silver 3 Bronze 12 Total 19

Summer Universiade appearances (overview)
- 1967; 1970; 1973; 1975; 1977; 1979; 1981; 1983; 1985; 1987; 1989; 1991; 1993; 1995; 1997; 1999; 2001; 2003; 2005; 2007; 2009; 2011; 2013; 2015; 2017; 2019; 2021; 2025; 2027

Australia participated at the 2015 Summer Universiade in Gwangju, South Korea.

== Medal summary ==
=== Medal by sports ===
Medals by sport
| Sport | 1st place, gold medalist(s) | 2nd place, silver medalist(s) | 3rd place, bronze medalist(s) | Total |
|---|---|---|---|---|
| Athletics | 1 | 1 | 3 | 5 |
| Shooting | 0 | 0 | 2 | 2 |
| Swimming | 2 | 2 | 7 | 11 |
| Water polo | 1 | 0 | 0 | 11 |
| Total | 4 | 3 | 12 | 19 |

=== Medalists ===
| Medal | Name | Sport | Event | Date |
|---|---|---|---|---|
| Gold | Justin James | Swimming | Men's 200m Individual Medley | 6 July |
| Gold | Dane Bird-Smith | Athletics | Men's 20km Walk | 9 July |
| Gold | Holly Barratt | Swimming | Women's 50m Backstroke | 9 July |
| Gold | Lilian Hedges; Pascalle Casey; Elle Armit; Montana Perkins; Isobel Bishop; Julia Barton; Lena Mihailovic; Ellodie Ruffin; Fiona Walsh; Jessica Zimmerman; Tiana Sogaard-Andersen; Madeleine Steere; Tyler Baillie | Water polo | Women's Team | 13 July |
| Silver | Jack McLoughlin | Swimming | Men's 400m Freestyle | 6 July |
| Silver | Jacob Hansford; Travis Mahoney; Jack Mcloughlin; Justin James | Swimming | Men's 4 × 200 m Freestyle Relay | 9 July |
| Silver | Matthew Denny | Athletics | Men's Discus Throw | 11 July |
| Bronze | Catherine Skinner | Shooting | Women's Trap | 5 July |
| Bronze | Catherine Skinner; Gemma Dunn; Indi Gladman | Shooting | Women's Trap Team | 5 July |
| Bronze | Holly Barratt | Swimming | Women's 50m Butterfly | 5 July |
| Bronze | Jacob Hansford | Swimming | Men's 200m Freestyle | 6 July |
| Bronze | Ami Matsuo | Swimming | Women's 100m Freestyle | 6 July |
| Bronze | Kiah Melverton | Swimming | Women's 1500m Freestyle | 6 July |
| Bronze | Ellen Fullerton | Swimming | Women's 200m Individual Medley | 7 July |
| Bronze | Naa Adjeley Anang | Athletics | Women's Long Jump | 9 July |
| Bronze | Michelle Jenneke | Athletics | Women's 100m Hurdles | 10 July |
| Bronze | Rachel Tallent; Stephanie Stigwood; Nicole Fagan | Athletics | Women's Team 20 km Walk | 10 July |
| Bronze | Holly Barratt | Swimming | Women's 50m Freestyle | 10 July |
| Bronze | Kiah Melverton | Swimming | Women's 800m Freestyle | 10 July |
