= China at the 2015 Summer Universiade =

- IOC code: CHN
- NOC: Chinese Olympic Committee
- Website: http://www.olympic.cn/

in Gwangju, South Korea 3 – 14 July 2015
- Competitors: 370 in 18 sports
- Medals Ranked 3rd: Gold 34 Silver 22 Bronze 16 Total 72

Summer Universiade appearances (overview)
- 1979; 1981; 1983; 1985; 1987; 1989; 1991; 1993; 1995; 1997; 1999; 2001; 2003; 2005; 2007; 2009; 2011; 2013; 2015; 2017; 2019; 2021; 2025; 2027

China participated at the 2015 Summer Universiade, in Gwangju, South Korea.

== Medals by sport ==
Medals by sport
Sport	1st place, gold medalist(s)	2nd place, silver medalist(s)	3rd place, bronze medalist(s)	Total
Athletics	2	3	4	9
Badminton	0	3	0	3
Gymnastics	1	0	0	1
Diving	10	4	3	17
Judo	0	1	1	2
Rowing	1	0	0	1
Shooting	8	6	3	17
Swimming	4	2	0	6
Table tennis	4	1	2	7
Taekwondo	4	2	3	9
Total	34	22	16	72

== Medalists ==
Medal	Name	Sport	Event	Date
Gold	Peng Jiangfeng	Diving	Men's 3m springboard	4 July
Gold	Zheng Shuangxue	Diving	Women's 1m springboard	4 July
Gold	Wang Ying	Diving	Women's 10m platform	5 July
Gold	Liu Zhiguo	Shooting	Men's 10m rifle	5 July
Gold	Yang Haoran; Liu Zhiguo; Yang Jiazhou	Shooting	Men's 10m rifle team	5 July
Gold	Chen Dongqi; Yi Siling; Liu Yishuo	Shooting	Women's 10m rifle team	5 July
Gold	Lu Ying	Swimming	Women's 50m butterfly	5 July
Gold	Peng Jianfeng	Diving	Men's 1m springboard	6 July
Gold	Cen Yu	Gymnastics	Men's vault	7 July
Gold	Wang Anqi; Wang Yao	Diving	Men's 10m synchronished platform	7 July
Gold	Wang Miao	Rowing	Women's lightweight single sculls	7 July
Gold	Zhang Sishi	Swimming	Women's 200m individual medley	7 July
Gold	Zhang Shuangxue	Diving	Women's 3m springboard	8 July
Gold	Chen Kehan	Shooting	Men's 25m rapid fire pistol	8 July
Gold	Huang Xiao; Lin Yuemei; Zhou Qing Yuan	Shooting	Women's 10m air pistol team	8 July
Gold	Chen Dongqi; Yi Siling; Chen Fan	Shooting	Women's 50m rifle 3 position team	8 July
Gold	Lu Ying	Swimming	Women's 100m butterfly	8 July
Gold	Li Ling	Athletics	Women's Pole Vault	9 July
Gold	Wang Yao	Diving	Men's 10 metre Platform	9 July
Gold	Men Diving Team	Diving	Men's Team Classification	9 July
Gold	Qu Lin; Sun Mengchen	Diving	Women's Synchronised 3m Springboard	9 July
Gold	Women Diving Team	Diving	Women's Team Classification	9 July
Gold	Yang Haoran	Shooting	Men's 50 metre Rifle 3 Positions	10 July
Gold	Liu Zhiguo; Yang Haoran; Zhao Zhonghao	Shooting	Men's 50m Rifle 3 Positions Team	10 July
Gold	Zhou Yilin	Swimming	Women's 200m Butterfly	10 July
Gold	Liu Yi; Jiaxin Lai; Lyu Xiang; Fang Yinchi; Chen Xin	Table tennis	Men's Team	10 July
Gold	Che Xiaoxi; Guo Yichen; Jiang Yue; Ma Yuofei; Zheng Shichang	Table tennis	Women's Team	10 July
Gold	Guo Yunfei	Taekwondo	Women's -67 kg	10 July
Gold	Zhang Hua	Taekwondo	Women's -62 kg	11 July
Gold	Zhang Yingying	Athletics	Women's Half Marathon	12 July
Gold	Che Xiaoxi; Jiang Yue	Table tennis	Women's Doubles	12 July
Gold	Zheng Shuyin	Taekwondo	Women's -73 kg	12 July
Gold	Che Xiaoxi	Table tennis	Women's Singles	13 July
Gold	Ren Dandan; Sun Tongtong; Xue Yanhong	Taekwondo	Women's Team Kyorugi	13 July
Silver	Li Yanan; Zhong Yuming	Diving	Men's Synchronised 3m Springboard	5 July
Silver	Wang Han	Diving	Women's 10 metre Platform	5 July
Silver	Yang Haoran	Shooting	Men's 10 metre Air Rifle	5 July
Silver	Zhang Xinghao	Diving	Men's 1m Springboard	6 July
Silver	Zhou Qingyuan	Shooting	Women's 25 metre Pistol	6 July
Silver	Li Peijing; Chen Dongqi; Chen Fang	Shooting	Women's 50 metre Rifle Prone Team	6 July
Silver	Kang Jie	Judo	Women's Open	7 July
Silver	Wang Shijia; Zhang Jiaqi; Zhou Yilin; Zhang Sishi	Swimming	Women's 4 × 200 m Freestyle Relay	7 July
Silver	Liu Tian	Diving	Women's 3m Springboard	8 July
Silver	Fan Mengyan; Gao Huan; Hui Xirui; Ou Dongni; Qiao Bin; Wang Yilyu; Xu Zuopeng; Yu Xiaohan; Zhang Wen; Zhang Zhijun	Badminton	Mixed Team	8 July
Silver	Sun Chenggang; Yin Jiaxing; Zhang Zhi; Xie Sichao	Athletics	Men's Team 20 km Walk	9 July
Silver	Wang Zhiwei	Shooting	Men's 25m Standard Pistol	9 July
Silver	Wang Zhiwei; Chen Kehan; Cao Heyuan	Shooting	Men's 25m Standard Pistol Team	9 July
Silver	Wang Shijia	Swimming	Women's 200m Freestyle	9 July
Silver	Hou Yongbo; Yang Jiayu; Yang Mingxia; Liu Huan	Athletics	Women's Team 20 km Walk	10 July
Silver	Wang Zhiwei	Shooting	Men's 10 metre Air Pistol	10 July
Silver	Wang Yilyu; Zhang Wen	Badminton	Men's Doubles	12 July
Silver	Ou Dongni; Yu Xiaohan	Badminton	Women's Doubles	12 July
Silver	Zhao Shuai	Taekwondo	Men's -63 kg	12 July
Silver	Zhang Yingying; Zhang Meixia; Xiao Huinin	Athletics	Women's Team Half Marathon	13 July
Silver	Jiang Yue	Table tennis	Women's Singles	13 July
Silver	Wang Guangshuai; Zhao Panfeng; Qiao Sen; Zhao Shuai	Taekwondo	Men's Team Kyorugi	13 July
Bronze	Sun Mengchen	Diving	Women's 1m Springboard	4 July
Bronze	Kang Jie	Judo	Women's +78 kg	4 July
Bronze	Wang Han; Wang Ying	Diving	Women's Synchronised 10 metre Platform	6 July
Bronze	Wang Zhiwei	Shooting	Men's 50 meter Pistol	6 July
Bronze	Lin Yuemei	Shooting	Women's 25 meter Pistol	6 July
Bronze	Wu Chuang	Taekwondo	Men's Individual Poomsae	7 July
Bronze	Zhang Yingying	Athletics	Women's 10000m	8 July
Bronze	Yang Haoran	Shooting	Men's 50m Rifle Prone	8 July
Bronze	Xu Xiaolong	Athletics	Men's Triple Jump	9 July
Bronze	Wang Anqi	Diving	Men's 10 metre Platform	9 July
Bronze	Hou Yongbo	Athletics	Women's 20 km Walk	10 July
Bronze	Yang Huizhen	Athletics	Women's 400m	10 July
Bronze	Wang Guangshuai	Taekwondo	Men's -80 kg	10 July
Bronze	Chen Xin; Liu Yi	Table tennis	Men's Doubles	12 July
Bronze	Qiao Sen	Taekwondo	Men's -87 kg	12 July
Bronze	Liu Yi	Table tennis	Men's Singles	13 July

== Diving ==
Men

Athlete	Event	Preliminaries		Semifinals		Final	
Athlete	Event	Points	Rank	Points	Rank	Points	Rank
Peng Jianfeng	Men's 1 metre springboard	425.10	1				1st place, gold medalist(s)
Zhong Xinghao	Men's 1 metre springboard	354.70	7	369.50	1	397.10	2nd place, silver medalist(s)
